= John Skinner =

John Skinner may refer to:

== Politicians ==
- John Skinner (MP for Maldon), 1391–1393, MP for Maldon 1391 and 1393
- John Skinner (fl.1395-99), MP for Reigate 1395, 1397 and 1399
- John Skinner (fl.1414-20), MP for Reigate 1414, 1415 and 1420
- John Skinner (MP for Hythe), MP for Hythe 1419, 1423, 1425 and 1427
- John Skinner (died ?1543) (died 1543), MP for Reigate in 1529
- John Skinner (died 1571), MP for Reigate and Surrey
- John Skinner (died 1584) (1535–1584), MP for Reigate 1559 and 1572

== Others ==
- John Skinner (professor) (1851-1925) Principal and Professor of Old Testament literature, Westminster College, Cambridge.
- John Skinner (early settler) (1590–1650), early Puritan settler in the Massachusetts Bay Colony
- John Skinner (poet) (1721–1807), Scottish historian and songwriter
- John Skinner (bishop) (1744–1816), bishop of Aberdeen and Orkney
- John Skinner (archaeologist) (1772–1839), English parish vicar and amateur antiquarian and archaeologist
- John Skinner (cricketer) (1850–1926), English cricketer
- John Edwin Hilary Skinner (1839–1894), English war correspondent
- John Kendrick Skinner (1883–1918), Scottish recipient of the Victoria Cross
- John Stuart Skinner (1788–1851), American lawyer, publisher, and editor
- John W. Skinner (1890–1955), headmaster of Culford School, 1924–1951
- John O. Skinner (1845–1932), American physician and Medal of Honor recipient
