= Richard atte Mere =

Member of the Parliament of England

Richard atte Mere (fl.1386–1397), was an English Member of Parliament.

He was a Member (MP) of the Parliament of England for Reigate in 1386 and September 1397. Nothing further has been recorded of him.

Parliament of England
Preceded by ? ?	Member of Parliament for Reigate; 1386; With: John Aubyn, junior	Succeeded by John Chaunce; Thomas Ballard
