= Granville William Gresham Leveson-Gower =

British Liberal politician

Granville William Gresham Leveson-Gower JP DL FSA
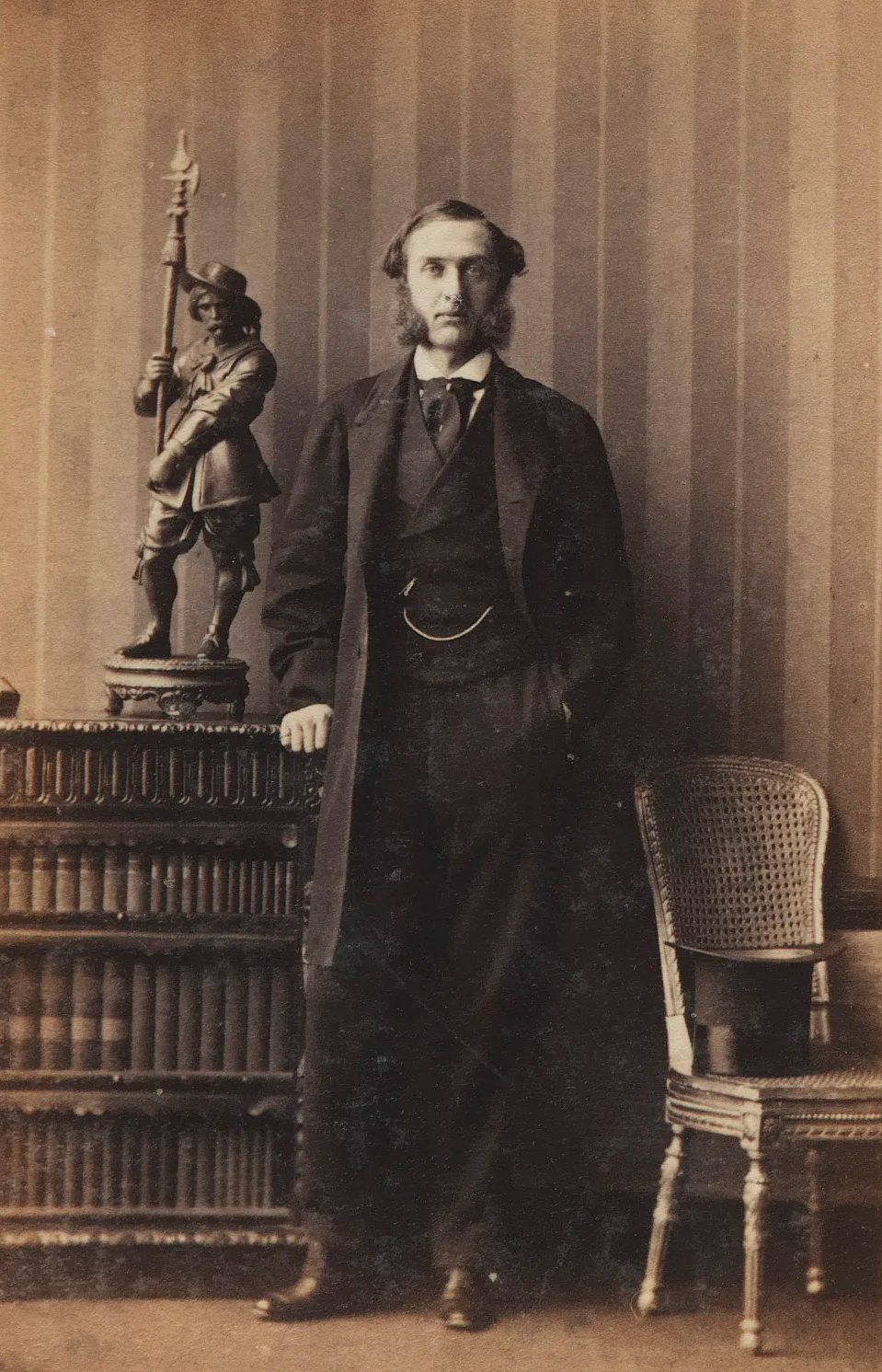
- Leveson-Gower in 1861

Member of Parliament for Reigate
- In office 6 February 1863 – 16 April 1866
- Preceded by: William Monson
- Succeeded by: Constituency disenfranchised

Personal details
- Born: 25 February 1838
- Died: 30 May 1895 (aged 57)
- Party: Liberal
- Spouse: The Hon. Sophia Leigh (after 1861)
- Children: 10, including Frederick Archibald Leveson-Gower and Henry Dudley
- Parent(s): William Leveson-Gower; Emily Josephine Eliza Doyle

Granville William Gresham Leveson-Gower JP DL FSA (25 February 1838 – 30 May 1895) was a British Liberal Party politician.

== Early life ==
Leveson-Gower was born on 25 February 1838 in the prominent Leveson-Gower family. He was the son of William Leveson-Gower of Titsey Place and Emily Josephine Eliza (née Doyle) Leveson-Gower. He was a great-great grandson of John Leveson-Gower, 1st Earl Gower, descending from his youngest son, John Leveson-Gower, a Royal Navy officer.

== Career ==
Leveson-Gower was elected Liberal MP for Reigate at a by-election in 1863—caused by the succession of William Monson to the peerage as Lord Monson—and held the seat until 1866 when he was unseated due to extensive bribery in the seat. The seat was later disfranchised under the Reform Act 1867.

== Personal life ==
In 1861, he married The Hon. Sophia Leigh LJStJ, daughter of Chandos Leigh, 1st Baron Leigh and Margarette (née Willes) Leigh. Sophia's brothers included Sir Edward Chandos Leigh, QC, and James Wentworth Leigh. Together, they lived at Titsey Place, Surrey and had at least ten children:

- Margaret Emily Leveson-Gower (1862–1948)
- Ronald William Leveson-Gower (1863–1889)
- Granville Charles Leveson-Gower (1865–1948)
- Ethel Sophie Leveson-Gower (1866–1950)
- Frederick Archibald Gresham Leveson-Gower (1871–1946)
- Evelyn Marmaduke Leveson-Gower (1872–1938)
- Henry Dudley Gresham Leveson-Gower (1873–1954)
- Cecil Octavius Leveson-Gower (1875–1937)
- Clement Edward Leveson-Gower (1876–1939)
- Katherine Ursula Leveson-Gower (1878–1963).

Leveson-Gower died on 30 May 1895.

== Book privately printed ==
- Granville Leveson Gower, Genealogy of the Family of Gresham (London: Mitchell and Hughes, 1883) – Full text at Google books

Parliament of the United Kingdom
Preceded by William Monson	Member of Parliament for Reigate; 1863–1866	Constituency disenfranchised
