= Chaunce =

Chaunce is a surname. Notable people with the surname include:

- John Chaunce (disambiguation), multiple people
- Roger Chaunce (disambiguation), multiple people

== See also ==
- Chauncey (name)
