= Roger James =

Roger James may refer to:

- Roger James (footballer) (born 1975), former Australian rules footballer
- Roger James (Blessed) (died 1539), Roman Catholic martyr
- Sir Roger James (died 1636) (1589–1636), English landowner and politician
- Roger James (died 1700) (1640–1700), English landowner and politician
- Roger James (producer) (1944–2015), producer of television documentaries
- Roger James (horse trainer), New Zealand thoroughbred race horse trainer
