= John Agmondesham =

John Agmondesham may refer to:

- John Agmondesham (died 1573), MP for Reigate in 1571
- John Agmondesham (died 1598), MP for Lostwithiel (UK Parliament constituency), Christchurch and Bossiney
