= H. D. G. Leveson Gower =

English cricketer (1873–1954)

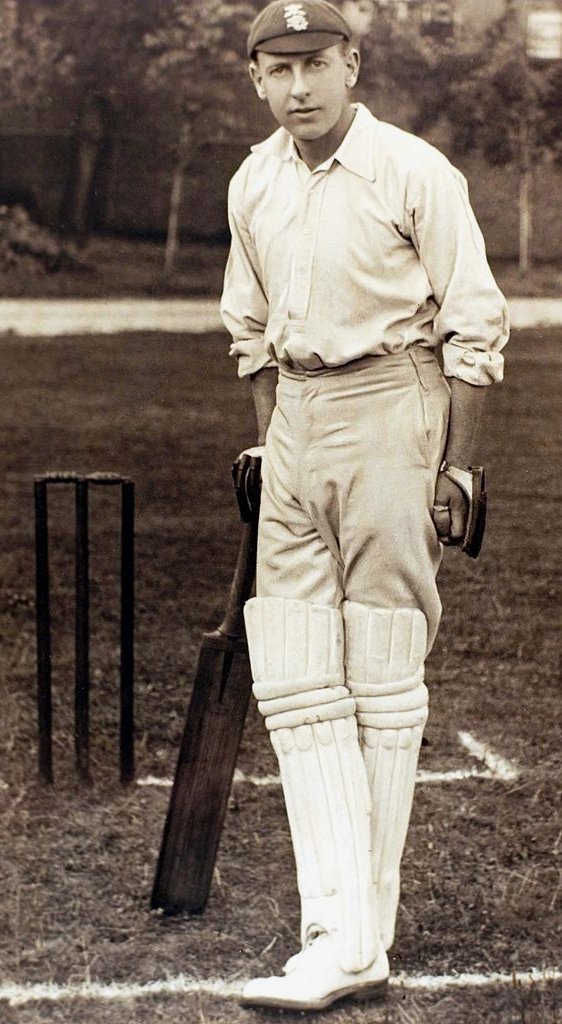
- Gower in the late 1890s

Personal information
- Full name: Henry Dudley Gresham Leveson Gower
- Born: 8 May 1873; Titsey Place, Surrey, England
- Died: 1 February 1954 (aged 80); Kensington, London, England
- Nickname: Shrimp
- Batting: Right-handed
- Bowling: Right arm leg break
- Relatives: Richard Borgnis (nephew)

International information
- National side: England
- Test debut (cap 166): 1 January 1910 v South Africa
- Last Test: 3 March 1910 v South Africa

Domestic team information
- Years: Team
- 1893–1896: Oxford University
- 1895–1920: Surrey

Career statistics
Competition	Test	First-class
Matches	3	277
Runs scored	95	7,638
Batting average	23.75	23.72
100s/50s	0/0	4/42
Top score	31	155
Balls bowled	–	2,261
Wickets	–	46
Bowling average	–	29.95
5 wickets in innings	–	3
10 wickets in match	–	0
Best bowling	–	6/49
Catches/stumpings	1/–	103/–
- Source: CricInfo, 11 November 2008

Sir Henry Dudley Gresham Leveson Gower (/ˈljuːsən ˈɡɔːr/ LEW-sən GOR; 8 May 1873 – 1 February 1954) was an English cricketer from the Leveson-Gower family. He played first-class cricket for Oxford University and Surrey and captained England in Test cricket. His school nickname "Shrimp" remained with him through his life, but few cricket sources refer to him by anything other than his initials. He was a selector for the England cricket team, and a cricketing knight.

== Early life ==
Leveson Gower was born in Titsey Place near Oxted in Surrey, the seventh of twelve sons of Granville William Gresham Leveson-Gower JP DL FSA, by his wife The Honourable Sophia Leveson Gower LJStJ (née Leigh). His father was a great-great-grandson of John Leveson-Gower, 1st Earl Gower (descending from his youngest son, John), and served as Liberal MP for two years for Reigate from 1863 to 1865. His mother was the daughter of Chandos Leigh, 1st Baron Leigh and sister of Sir Edward Chandos Leigh QC and James Wentworth Leigh. His uncles, and brothers Frederick Leveson-Gower and Evelyn Marmaduke Gresham Leveson-Gower, also played first-class cricket.

He was educated at Winchester College, where he played cricket for the school first eleven for three years from 1890, and in 1892 he captained the school team to its first victory against Eton College for 10 years, scoring 99 runs and taking 8 wickets for 33 runs in the match. The school team also included Jack Mason, who later played first-class cricket for Kent.

He attended Magdalen College, Oxford, and played cricket for Oxford for four years, receiving his blue in 1893 and captaining the Oxford team in 1896. He hit 73 runs and took 7–84 in the match against Cambridge in 1895. He did not receive a degree.

== Cricket career ==
He started to play for Surrey as an amateur in 1895. He played his last match for Surrey in 1920, but continued to play occasional first-class cricket until 1931. In all, he played in 277 first-class matches, scoring 7,638 runs at a batting average of 23.72, including 4 centuries, and took 46 wickets at an average of 29.95, including 5 wickets on three occasions. His highest first-class score, 155, was reached playing for Sussex against Oxford in 1899. As captain of Surrey from 1908 to 1910, he led the team to 3rd, 5th and 2nd in the County Championship. He was treasurer of Surrey from 1926 to 1928, and the club's president from 1929 to 1939. He was an outstanding fielder, and took 103 catches.

He toured the West Indies with Lord Hawke in 1896–97, and North America with Pelham Warner in 1897. He joined the Marylebone Cricket Club (MCC) tours to South Africa in 1905–6, but did not play in the Tests. He returned to South Africa in 1909–10, and captained England in all three of the Test matches he played, winning one and losing two against South Africa in 1909/10, with Frederick Fane captaining the other two Test matches of the series.

He played for the Gentlemen against the Players on several occasions. For fifty years he played a major role in organising the Scarborough Festival which takes place at the end of each English cricket season. Touring Test teams would play annually against H. D. G. Leveson Gower's XI. He became a Freeman of the Borough of Scarborough in 1950.

Leveson Gower became an England Test selector in 1909, and was chairman of selectors in 1924 and from 1927 to 1930. In 1925, he published a book called Cricket Personalities, which included profiles on well-known cricketers such as Jack Hobbs, Percy Fender and Frank Woolley. He was knighted for his services to cricket in 1953 and in the same year he published a book of reminiscences entitled Off and on the Field.

== Other activities ==
Outside cricket, Leveson Gower was a stockbroker. He married Enid Mary Hammond-Chambers in 1908. They had no children.

He served as a major in the Royal Army Service Corps in the First World War, and was mentioned in dispatches.

He died in Kensington, survived by his wife.

== Nickname ==
Leveson Gower was nicknamed "Shrimp" at school, probably due to his shortness and slight physique, but few cricket sources refer to him by anything other than his initials. During a tour of America in 1897 organised by Plum Warner that Leveson Gower took part in, the Philadelphian journalist Ralph D. Paine published the following piece of humorous verse concerning the pronunciation of his surname:

At one end stocky Jessop frowned,
The human catapult
Who wrecks the roofs of distant towns
When set in his assault.
His mate was that perplexing man
We know as "Looshun-Gore",
It isn’t spelt at all that way,
We don’t know what it's for.

But as with Cholmondeley and St. John
The alphabet is mixed,
And Yankees cannot help but ask -
"Why don't you get it fixed?"

Sporting positions
Preceded by Archie MacLaren	English national cricket captain 1909/10	Succeeded by Johnny Douglas
