= Roger James (died 1700) =

English landowner and politician

Roger James (c 1620 – 25 July 1700) was an English landowner and politician who sat in the House of Commons at various times between 1661 and 1690.

== Biography ==
James was the son of Sir Roger James, of Reigate, Surrey and his wife Margaret Aucher, daughter of Anthony Aucher of Bishopsbourne, Kent. He was admitted at Clare College, Cambridge on 13 July 1637 and was admitted at Inner Temple in 1639. He was an elder of the Reigate classis in 1647 and studied at Leyden in 1648. In 1659 he became J.P. for Surrey and was a commissioner for militia in March 1660. In April 1660 he stood for parliament at Gatton where he was involved in a double return and did not sit before the election was declared void. He was commissioner for oyer and terminer on the Home circuit in July 1660, commissioner for sewers for Surrey and Kent in August 1660 and commissioner for assessment for Surrey from August 1660.

In 1661, James was elected Member of Parliament for Reigate in the Cavalier Parliament. He was commissioner for recusants in 1675 and commissioner for the rebuilding of Southwark in 1677. He was re-elected MP for Reigate in the two elections of 1679. In 1680 he was removed from the commission of the peace when exclusionist justices were purged. He also suspended his role as commissioner for assessment for Surrey until 1689. He was elected again for as MP for Reigate in 1689. He was reinstated as J.P. in 1690. In 1695 he stood unsuccessfully at Reigate.

James died at the age of about 80 and was buried privately at Reigate late at night as he had requested.

== Family ==
James married his cousin Elizabeth Aucher, daughter of Sir Anthony Aucher of Bishopsbourne, by 1649 and had two sons and two daughters.

== Notes ==
Parliament of England
| Preceded by John Hele; Edward Thurland | Member of Parliament for Reigate; 1661–1679; With: Edward Thurland 1661–1673; Sir John Werden 1663–1679; Ralph Freeman; Deane Goodwin | Succeeded by Ralph Freeman; Deane Goodwin |
| Preceded by Sir John Werden; Sir John Parsons | Member of Parliament for Reigate; 1689–1690; With: Sir John Parsons 1689; Thomas Vincent 1689–1690 | Succeeded by Sir John Parsons; John Parsons |
