= List of presidents of Surrey County Cricket Club =

Surrey County Cricket Club is one of eighteen county teams in England that play first-class cricket. Below is a complete list of those who have served as President of the club. The position is an unpaid honorary one, the President acting as a figurehead. Those chosen are distinguished supporters of the club from all walks of life, including politics, business and entertainment, as well as notable former Surrey players and officials. From 1978 to 2012, Presidents usually served a one-year term, from the AGM held in March or April of the year specified until the following year's AGM, but in recent years a two-year term has been the norm.

| No. | Name | Years |
|---|---|---|
| 1 | W. Strahan | 1844–1855 |
| 2 | H. Marshall | 1856–1866 |
| 3 | Frederick Miller | 1867–1878 |
| 4 | William Monson | 1879–1894 |
| 5 | Richard Webster | 1895–1915 |
| 6 | Jeremiah Colman | 1916–1922 |
| 7 | St John Brodrick | 1923–1925 |
| 8 | George Longman | 1926–1928 |
| 9 | Henry Leveson-Gower | 1929–1939 |
| 10 | B.A. Glanvill | 1940–1946 |
| 11 | Harry Primrose | 1947–1949 |
| 12 | Walter Monckton | 1950–1952; 1959–1964 |
| 13 | Arthur Tedder | 1953–1958 |
| 14 | Terence Nugent | 1965–1968 |
| 15 | Caryl Thain | 1969 |
| 16 | Maurice Allom | 1970–1977 |
| 17 | W.E. Gerrish | 1978 |
| 18 | George Edwards | 1979 |
| 19 | Alfred Gover | 1980 |
| 20 | Stuart Surridge | 1981 |
| 21 | Geoffrey Rimbault | 1982 |
| 22 | Michael Barton | 1983 |
| 23 | Alexander Durie | 1984 |
| 25 | Robert Carr | 1985 |
| 26 | Martin Turner | 1986 |
| 27 | Alec Bedser | 1987 |
| 28 | Michael Sandberg | 1988 |
| 29 | Geoffrey Howard | 1989 |
| 30 | Eric Bedser | 1990 |
| 31 | Bernard Coleman | 1991 |
| 32 | William D. Wickson and Dennis Cox | 1992 |
| 33 | John Stocker | 1993 |
| 41 | John Poland | 1994 |
| 35 | Peter May | 1995 (Note: Peter May was awarded the honour of President after his death from a brain tumour on 27 December 1994.) |
| 36 | John Paul Getty Jr. | 1996 |
| 37 | Betty Surridge | 1997 |
| 38 | Micky Stewart | 1998–99 |
| 39 | John Major | 2000–01 |
| 40 | Brian Downing | 2002–03 |
| 41 | Derek Newton | 2004 |
| 42 | Richard Stilgoe | 2005 |
| 43 | John Edrich | 2006 |
| 44 | Vic Dodds | 2007 |
| 45 | Roger Knight | 2008 |
| 46 | Mike Soper | 2009 |
| 47 | David Watts | 2010 |
| 48 | Roger Harman | 2011 |
| 49 | Sir Michael Pickard | 2012 |
| 50 | Sir Trevor McDonald | 2013-14 |
| 51 | Pat Pocock | 2015-16 |
| 52 | David P Stewart | 2017-18 |
| 53 | Ken Schofield | 2019-21 |
| 54 | David Pakeman | 2021-23 |
| 55 | Patricia Garrard | 2023-25 |
| 56 | Lord Tony Grabiner | 2025- |
