= Lord Monson =

Lord Monson may refer to

- Baron Monson, of Burton in the County of Lincolnshire, is a title in the Peerage of Great Britain. It was created in 1728 for Sir John Monson, 5th Baronet.
- William Monson, 1st Viscount Monson of Castlemaine in the Peerage of Ireland who lost his title as part of his punishment for his part in the regicide of Charles I.
