= William Bone =

William Bone may refer to:

- William Arthur Bone (1871–1938), British chemist
- William Bone (MP) (fl. 1380–1391), English politician
- William Bone (footballer) in 2001 S.League
