= Thomas Bludder =

English politician

Sir Thomas Bludder (died 29 September 1655) was an English politician who sat in the House of Commons variously between 1621 and 1640.

== Background ==
Bludder was the son of Sir Thomas Bludder of Flanchford Reigate, and his wife Mary Herries, the daughter of Christopher Herries, of Shenfield, Margaretting, Essex. His father was a commissioner of the Victualling Office. He matriculated at Christ's College, Cambridge, in 1614 and graduated BA in 1617. He was admitted to the Inner Temple in 1616 and was knighted in 1618.

In 1621 Bludder was elected Member of Parliament for Gatton. He was elected Member for Reigate in 1624, 1625, 1626 and 1628. He sat until 1629, after which King Charles ruled without Parliament for eleven years. From 1627 to 1628 he was Surveyor of the Ordnance, a Crown appointment. He lodged in Covent Garden.

In April 1640, Bludder was again elected Member for Reigate in the Short Parliament. He was a benefactor of Christ's College.

Bludder died in 1655 and was commemorated by a tablet over the vestry door of the church of St Mary's Church.

Bludder married three times. His third wife who survived him was Elizabeth Bret daughter of Robert Bret.

Parliament of England
Preceded by Sir Thomas Gresham	Member of Parliament for Gatton; 1621–1622; With: Sir Thomas Gresham	Succeeded by Sir Edmund Bowyer; Samuel Owfield
Preceded by Thomas Glemham; Robert Lewis	Member of Parliament for Reigate; 1624–1629; With: Robert Lewis 1624; Roger James 1625; William Monson 1626; Charles Cockayne 1628	Parliament suspended until 1640
Parliament suspended since 1629	Member of Parliament for Reigate; 1640 (April); With: Edward Thurland	Succeeded by William Lord Monson; George Evelyn
