= Thomas Windsor =

Thomas Windsor may refer to:

- Thomas Windsor (MP for Reigate) (by 1517-c.1567), English politician
- Thomas Windsor, 1st Viscount Windsor (c.1670–1738), English soldier, landowner and politician
- Thomas Hickman-Windsor, 1st Earl of Plymouth (c.1627–1687)

== See also ==
- Tom Winsor (born 1957), British civil servant
