= John Aubyn, senior =

English politician (fl. 1377–1382)

John Aubyn (fl. 1377–1382) was an English politician.

He was a member (MP) of the Parliament of England for Reigate in January 1377, 1378 and October 1382. His son, John Aubyn, junior, was also an MP for Reigate.
