= George Cockerill (British Army officer) =

British politician

Brigadier-General Sir George Cockerill CB
- Cockerill in 1919, photographed by Walter Stoneman

Member of Parliament for Reigate
- In office 14 December 1918 – 7 October 1931
- Preceded by: Richard Hamilton Rawson
- Succeeded by: Gordon Touche

Personal details
- Born: 13 August 1867 Newquay
- Died: 19 April 1957 (aged 89)
- Party: Conservative

Military service
- Allegiance: United Kingdom
- Branch/service: British Army
- Years of service: 1888–1919
- Rank: Brigadier-General
- Unit: Queen's Royal Regiment (West Surrey)
- Commands: 7th (Extra Reserve) Battalion, Royal Fusiliers
- Battles/wars: Hazara Expedition of 1888; Chitral Expedition; North-West Frontier; Second Boer War; First World War
- Awards: Companion of the Order of the Bath; Mentioned in Despatches

Brigadier-General Sir George Kynaston Cockerill, CB (13 August 1867 – 19 April 1957) was a British Army officer and a Conservative Party politician.

== Career ==
Cockerill was born in Newquay. He was the son of Surgeon-General Robert William Cockerill, and his wife Clara Sandys, daughter of Major-General Charles Pooley.

He joined the Queen's Royal Regiment (West Surrey) in February 1888, was promoted to a lieutenant on 26 June 1889, and served in the Hazara Expedition in 1891. From 1892 to 1895 he explored the eastern Hindu Kush, for which he won the MacGregor Memorial medal and was a gold medallist of the Royal United Services Institute in India. He served with the Chitral Relief Force in 1895, on the North-West Frontier of India from 1897 to 1898, and was promoted to captain (supernumerary) on 11 February 1899. He was a staff officer in the Second Boer War from 1900 to 1902, serving as deputy assistant adjutant general for communications from February 1900. For his war service, he was mentioned in despatches (dated 8 April 1902) and received brevet promotion to major in the South African Honours list published on 26 June 1902.

Following the end of the war, he received a regular commission as a captain in the 4th battalion Royal Warwickshire Regiment in August 1902, and left Cape Town on the SS Norman two months later to join his battalion at Dublin. In 1907 he became a major in the Royal Fusiliers (City of London Regiment), and retired in 1910.

In retirement he was promoted on 15 January 1913 to major and served in the Special Reserve and in April 1914 was promoted to lieutenant colonel to command the 7th (Extra Reserve) Battalion, Royal Fusiliers.

At the December 1910 general election Cockerill stood unsuccessfully as the Conservative candidate in the Thornbury division of Gloucestershire. He was British technical delegate at the Second Hague Conference in 1907. At the outbreak of the First World War he mobilised the 7th Royal Fusiliers and then served in the War Office, first as Sub-Director of Military Operations, then as Deputy Director of Military Intelligence and Director of Special Intelligence with the rank of brigadier-general. He received many honours for his wartime work, including being made a Companion of the Order of the Bath in 1916.

At the 1918 general election Cockerill was elected unopposed as the Member of Parliament (MP) for the Reigate division of Surrey, having stood as a Coalition Conservative. He was returned unopposed in 1922 and in 1923, and re-elected with large majorities in 1924 and 1929. He retired from the House of Commons at the 1931 general election, having been knighted in the 1926 Birthday Honours.

== Animal welfare ==
Cockerill advocated for animal welfare and as a member of Parliament was instrumental in securing passage of the Performing Animals (Regulation) Act 1925. He was honorary director of the International League for the Protection of Horses in 1939.

== Selected publications ==
- Sir George Cockerill. "Pioneer Exploration in Hunza and Chitral". The Himalayan Journal. Vol. 11. 1939. 14–41.

Parliament of the United Kingdom
Preceded by Richard Hamilton Rawson	Member of Parliament for Reigate; 1918 – 1931	Succeeded by Gordon Touche
