= John Chaunce =

John Chaunce may refer to:

- John Chaunce (fl. 1363–1388), MP for Reigate
- John Chaunce (fl. 1406–1409), MP for Reigate
