= Richer =

Richer and Richers are surnames. Notable people and characters with these surnames include:

== Richer ==
- Richer, Count in Luihgau and Hainaut (died 972)
- Richer (bishop of Verdun) (fl. 1089–1107)
- Bob Richer (born 1951), ice hockey defenceman, played for the Buffalo Sabres
- Claude Lavoie Richer (1929–2014), Canadian skier at the 1952 Winter Olympics
- Edmond Richer (1559–1631), French theologian
- Guy Richer (born 1954), Canadian actor
- Jean Richer (1630–1696), French astronomer
- Jeannine Richer (1924-2022), French author and composer
- Julian Richer (born 1959), founder of British hi-fi retailer Richer Sounds
- Lyse Richer (born 1939), Canadian administrator and music teacher
- Paul Richer (1849–1933), French anatomist, physiologist sculptor and artist
- Robert Richer, associate deputy director of operations of the CIA
- Stéphane Richer (ice hockey defenceman) (born 1966)
- Stéphane Richer (ice hockey forward) (born 1966)

== Richers ==
- Herbert Richers (1923–2009), Brazilian film and dubbing producer
- Robert Richers (by 1524 – 1587/89), English lawyer, MP for Reigate and for Grampound
- "Richers", characters in the South Park episode "Here Comes the Neighborhood"

== See also ==
- Richerus, monk of St. Remi at Reims
