= Sir John Werden, 1st Baronet =

Sir John Werden, 1st Baronet (also Worden) (1640 – 29 October 1716) was an English barrister, judge, politician and diplomat.

== Life ==
Born at Cholmondeston, Cheshire, he was the eldest son of Robert Werden, and his first wife, Jane Backham. He was called to the bar in 1660 at the Middle Temple, and on 16 November 1664 was admitted baron of the exchequer for Cheshire.

Werden became secretary to the embassy in Spain and Portugal under the Earl of Sandwich, and at the end of 1669 was sent to Holland with official instructions to Sir William Temple to moderate his support for the Triple Alliance, which Charles II found untimely. In 1670 he went to Sweden as envoy extraordinary, but in 1672 he was again in Holland.

On 28 November 1672 Werden was created a baronet. He was also secretary to James, Duke of York, and took a shorthand report of Titus Oates's narrative before the House of Lords. On 11 February 1673 (Note: dates are in the Julian calendar with the start of year as 1 January (see Old Style and New Style dates).) he was returned to Parliament for Reigate in Surrey, retaining his seat until the dissolution in January 1679. On 22 May 1683 he received the honorary degree of D.C.L. from the university of Oxford. At this period Werden employed John Ashton, the future Jacobite plotter.

After the accession of James II Werden was again returned to Parliament for Reigate, on 27 March 1685, and on 2 April was appointed a commissioner of customs. On the dissolution of Parliament in July 1687 he did not seek re-election. On 1 October 1688 he was placed on the commission of the lieutenancy of London, but on the landing of William of Orange, like his father, he deserted the king; and in consequence was excluded by name from James's declaration of pardon in 1692. William continued him in the commission for the customs, but not for the lieutenancy of London. In August 1697 he was removed from the customs, but was replaced on the accession of Queen Anne.

Werden was a Tory, and retired from office and public life in 1714 on the Hanoverian succession. He died on 29 October 1716, and was buried on 7 November in the church of St. Martin-in-the-Fields.

== Legacy ==
Some of Werden's letters written while he was secretary of the Duke of York went to the British Museum, and later to the British Library (in the Stowe MSS.).

== Family ==
Werden was twice married: first, to Lucy Osbourne, daughter of a doctor of divinity, and secondly to Mary (died 22 August 1683), daughter of William Osbourne of Kennford, Devon. By his second wife he had an only son John, whose daughter Lucy married Charles Beauclerk, 2nd Duke of St Albans a nd his second daughter Sussanah married Admiral Sir Henry William Bayntun KGCB of Walcot, Somerset whose daughter Sussanah married 1839 Richard Verity of Dean House, Huntington ; on the death of Sir John Werden, 2nd Baronet, without male issue, on 13 February 1758, the Werden baronetcy became extinct, and his estates passed to George Beauclerk, 3rd Duke of St Albans and Sussanah Baytun. (

== Notes ==
Parliament of England
Preceded by Roger James; Edward Thurland	Member of Parliament for Reigate; 1673–1679; With: Roger James	Succeeded by Roger James; Deane Goodwin
Preceded by Ralph Freeman; Deane Goodwin	Member of Parliament for Reigate; 1685–1687; With: Sir John Parsons	Succeeded by Roger James; Sir John Parsons
Baronetage of England
New creation	Baronet (of Cholmeaton); 1672–1716	Succeeded by John Werden
