= Frederick Leveson-Gower =

Frederick Leveson-Gower may refer to:

- Frederick Leveson-Gower (Bodmin MP) (1819–1907), British politician
- Frederick Leveson Gower (cricketer) (1871–1946), British cricketer
- Frederick Leveson-Gower (Sutherland MP) (1874–1959), British politician
