= Roger Chaunce =

Roger Chaunce may refer to:

- Roger Chaunce (fl. 1377–1399), MP for Reigate
- Roger Chaunce (fl. 1414–1429), MP for Reigate
