= Thomas Barber (Reigate MP) =

English politician

Thomas Barber (fl. 1397–1407) was an English politician. He sat as MP for Reigate in 1402 and 1407.
