= Thomas Banester =

16th-century English politician

Thomas Banester (by 1529–71), of London was an English politician.

He was a member (MP) of the parliament of England for Reigate in 1558.
