= Thomas Ingler =

16th-century English politician

Thomas Ingler (by 1516 – 26 September 1574), of Linkfield, Reigate, Surrey and the Middle Temple, London, was an English politician.

He was a member (MP) of the parliament of England for Reigate in October 1553.
