= James Skinner (MP) =

16th-century English politician

James Skinner (by 1489 – 30 July 1558), of Reigate, Surrey, was an English politician.

He was a member (MP) of the parliament of England for Reigate in 1542 and November 1554. His third wife, Margaret, was the widow of John Poyntz.
