= George Elsden =

16th-century English politician

George Elsden (born c. 1530), of Lyme Regis, Dorset, was an English politician.

He was a member (MP) of the parliament of England for Reigate in 1558 and for Lyme Regis in 1572.
