= Juliet Gardiner =

British historian and commentator (1943–2026)

Juliet Gardiner (24 June 1943 – 16 June 2026) was a British historian and a commentator on British social history from Victorian times through to the 1950s. She was an editor of History Today magazine, a research fellow at the Institute of Historical Research of the School of Advanced Study at the University of London, and an honorary fellow at the Institute for Advanced Studies in the Humanities and at the University of Edinburgh. Gardiner taught at Middlesex University and Oxford Brookes University. She also worked as a publisher for Weidenfeld & Nicolson.

== Early years ==
Gardiner was born on 24 June 1943 to an unmarried mother from Italy, who named her "Olivia". At the age of two she was adopted by a Hemel Hempstead sanitary inspector called Charles Wells and his wife Dolly. Her new parents renamed her "Gillian".

== Work ==
Gardiner was the editor of the History Today Companion to British History (1996), The Penguin Dictionary of British History (2000), and Who's Who in British History (2000). She worked as a historical consultant to the film of Atonement, and was a frequent broadcaster on radio and television, a reviewer and a contributor to the national press, including The Sunday Times, The Sunday Telegraph, the Financial Times, The Guardian and BBC History.

She wrote extensively on 20th century social history, including tie-ins for Channel 4 television series The 1940s House (2000) and The Edwardian Country House (2002). She edited three books linked to exhibitions at London's Imperial War Museum, From the Bomb to the Beatles (1999), The Children's War: The Second World War Through the Eyes of the Children of Britain (2005) and The Animals' War: Animals in Wartime from the First World War to the Present Day (2006).

Gardiner's book on 1930s Britain, The Thirties: An Intimate History, was published in 2009. Its purpose was, Gardiner has said, to take the structure of the 1930s, formed over the years by political and economic historians, and "fill in as many details as possible" about how people lived their lives during that period.

In 2012, Gardiner wrote and presented The History of the Future, a ten-episode series for BBC Radio 4, which explored how cultures of the past viewed the possibilities of the future.

== Personal life and death ==
In 1961, she married George Gardiner, a British Conservative Party politician and journalist, and assumed the name "Juliet Gardiner". She would later describe being married to a Conservative politician as being "like a vicar's wife who doesn't believe in God". They had three children. They divorced in 1980. Gardiner later married, divorced and remarried historian Henry Horwitz.

Gardiner died on 16 June 2026, aged 82. She had been diagnosed with an aggressive brain tumour 14 years earlier.

== Selected bibliography ==
- The Blitz: The British Under Attack (2010) (ISBN 978-0007240777)
- The Thirties: An Intimate History (2010) ISBN 978-0007240760
- The Animals' War: Animals in Wartime from the First World War to the Present Day (2006) ISBN 978-0749951030
- The Children's War: The Second World War Through the Eyes of the Children of Britain (2005) ISBN 978-0749950675
- Wartime: Britain 1939–1945 (2004) ISBN 978-0755310265
- The Edwardian Country House (2002) ISBN 978-0752261669
- The 1940s House (2000) ISBN 978-0752272535
- Who's Who in British History (editor) (2000) ISBN 978-1855857711
- The Penguin Dictionary of British History (editor) (2000) ISBN 9780140514735
- From the Bomb to the Beatles (1999) ISBN 978-1855856646
- History Today Companion to British History (editor, with Neil Wenborn) (1995) ISBN 978-1855851788
