= John Hele (died 1661) =

English lawyer and politician

John Hele (3 March 1626 – 25 January 1661) was an English lawyer and politician who sat in the House of Commons between 1659 and 1661.

Hele was the only son of Nicholas Hele of Wembury, Devon and Easton in Gordano, Somerset and his first wife Dorothy Stradling, daughter of Edmund Stradling of Easton in Gordano. He succeeded his father who died in 1640. He matriculated at Christ Church, Oxford on 21 October 1642 aged 16. He entered Lincoln's Inn in 1644 and was called to the bar in 1652. He bought the manor of Flanchford before 1656.

In 1659, Hele became a J.P. for Surrey and was commissioner for militia. He was also elected Member of Parliament for Reigate in the Third Protectorate Parliament. He was commissioner for assessment from January 1660 and commissioner for militia in March 1660. In April 1660 he was re-elected MP for Reigate in the Third Protectorate Parliament. He was also a colonel of militia from April 1660 and was commissioner for oyer and terminer for the Home circuit from July 1660.

Hele died intestate at the age of 34.

Hele married Dorothy, who was daughter of Sir John Hobart, 2nd Baronet., of Blickling, Norfolk and widow of Sir John Hele of Clifton Maybank, Dorset, and of Hugh Rogers of Cannington, Somerset. She married Lord Crofts as her fourth husband "after six weeks’ mourning".

Parliament of England
Preceded by John Goodwin	Member of Parliament for Reigate; 1659; With: Edward Thurland	Succeeded by William Monson
