= Stuart Surridge =

English cricketer

Personal information
- Full name: Walter Stuart Surridge
- Born: 3 September 1917; Herne Hill, Surrey
- Died: 13 April 1992 (aged 74); Glossop, Derbyshire
- Batting: Right-handed
- Bowling: Right-arm fast-medium
- Role: Bowler, captain

Domestic team information
- Years: Team
- 1939: Minor Counties
- 1947–1956, 1959: Surrey

Career statistics
Competition	First-class
Matches	267
Runs scored	3,882
Batting average	12.94
100s/50s	0/10
Top score	87
Balls bowled	32,319
Wickets	506
Bowling average	28.89
5 wickets in innings	22
10 wickets in match	1
Best bowling	7/49
Catches/stumpings	376/–
- Source: Cricinfo, 15 June 2013

Walter Stuart Surridge (3 September 1917 – 13 April 1992) was an English first-class cricketer who captained Surrey County Cricket Club. Neither a remarkable batsman nor bowler, Surridge was one of the most successful team captains in the history of the County Championship who, when not playing cricket, helped develop his family sports equipment business, Stuart Surridge & Co.

== Career ==
Born at Herne Hill, Surrey, and educated at Emanuel School in south London, Surridge was one of the most successful cricket captains in County Championship history. Through aggressive tactics, he turned an under-performing Surrey team into a record-breaking success in the 1950s. Surrey won the title in each of the five years Surridge was captain, from 1952 to 1956, and then won two more under Peter May to create a sequence that has not been equalled.

From a famous family of cricket bat makers, Surridge was only a moderate cricketer: a lower order batsman and a right-arm fast-medium bowler, whose stats, by the standards of his time, were somewhat expensive. He was 30 before he played in a first-class match, and usually Surridge was only selected for the first team if other players were injured or on Test duty.

Surrey's team in the early 1950s included several top-class bowlers. Alec Bedser was the main strike bowler for England for ten seasons after the Second World War; Jim Laker was amongst the best off spin bowlers in the country; Tony Lock was an aggressive slow left-arm bowler; and Peter Loader. Batting resources were thinner but, in Peter May, Surrey had a talented batsman. Despite having these players, Surrey lacked success until Surridge was appointed team captain after the 1951 season. They had shared the 1950 Championship with Lancashire but that was their only success since before the First World War.

Surridge's belief was that bowlers and catches win matches, and he aimed to win as many matches as he could. A fearless fielder close to the wicket, he encouraged others to follow his example. In his five years as captain, only in 1953 did Surrey win less than half their matches; in 1955, the county won 23 out of 28 games, losing the other five and going through the whole season without a single draw. His tactics were sometimes ruthless: in one match against a weak Worcestershire, having dismissed his opponents for a total of 25 runs, Surridge declared the Surrey innings closed at just 92 for three wickets, before bowling Worcestershire out again for 40 to win by an innings and 27 runs. "The weather forecast had not been good", he said. Even when Surrey's Test cricketers were playing for England, Surridge would inspire their replacements to go well.

Recognised as Wisden Cricketer of the Year in 1953, Surridge was selected to play for MCC 1954–56 and was elected president of Surrey CCC in 1981 (his widow, Betty, becoming president in 1997). In retirement after 1956, he served Surrey CCC on various committees as well as expanding his bat-making business, and was visiting the Surridge factory when he collapsed and died, aged 74. His son, also called Stuart, played once for Surrey in 1978.

== Stuart Surridge & Co ==
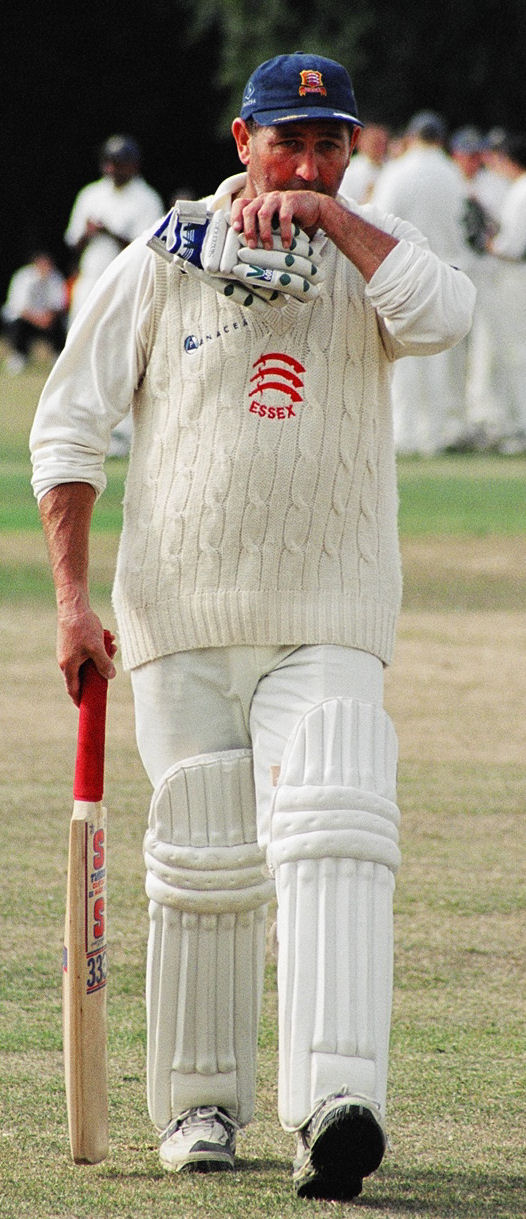
Graham Gooch with his SS Turbo

In 1867, Percy Stuart Surridge, Stuart Surridge's grandfather started a company repairing cricket bats. The business expanded, making a host of equipment including the Rapid Driver cricket bat that had a reinforced toe (patent no. 19386/28) which was used by W. G. Grace, K. S. Ranjitsinhji, C. B. Fry and Sir Don Bradman amongst others. In 1923 the company received a patent for their design in reinforcing tennis rackets to stop strings fraying, and produced a variety of equipment for sports, including hockey. The business was originally based at 175 Borough High Street, London, before they opened factories including their main base in Witham, Essex, and a willow farm in Aldermaston, Berkshire.

During the 1950s Stuart Surridge worked with his brother Percy at the business, introducing the SS logo during the 1960s. The company introduced the Cobbler football during this time, which was used in the Bundesliga and the 1976 Football League Cup final. During the 1970s Surridge entered the big hitter cricket bat market with its Jumbo, which was used by Viv Richards and Clive Rice. In 1979, Surridge manufactured the official ball of the English Football League, along with Mitre, with their version being called the UFO and was recognisable by its red stripe. The ball was famously involved in Justin Fashanu's goal for Norwich City in the 1980 league match against Liverpool when he scored that year's BBC Goal of the Season.

In the 1980s, John Surridge, Stuart's nephew and Percy's son designed the Turbo cricket bat. It was revolutionary as it was made from several pieces of timber glued together, with the glue flexing to give the batsman more power. The bat was most famously used by Graham Gooch in 1990 to score his record 333 against India at Lord's.

During the 1980s the company provided Jimmy White with snooker cues, launching an eponymous range of cues for sale. In 1991 the company sponsored Paul Gascoigne. In the early 1990s the company successfully went to court in India over the SS branding, which was also used by Sareen Sports Industries.

Surridge died in 1992 at age 74 while visiting one of the company's factories in Glossop.

In 1993, after his death, the Surridge family sold the business to Dunlop Slazenger. The Surridge brand was then sold on to a group of Indian and South African investors in 2000, before being purchased in 2003 by the SDL Group, based at Burnley in Lancashire.

== See also ==
- Cricket clothing and equipment
- Wisden Cricketers' Almanack
