= Thomas Gresham (died 1630) =

English landowner and politician

- Born: 1547; London, England
- Died: 1630 (aged 82–83); London, England
- Occupation: Politician

Sir Thomas Gresham (c. 1547 – 1630) was an English landowner and politician who sat in the House of Commons between 1604 and 1622.

Gresham was the eldest son of William Gresham (1512–1579) and his wife Beatrice Guybon and the grandson of Sir John Gresham, who was Lord Mayor in 1547.

He was educated St Alban Hall, Oxford, about 1572.

On his father's death in 1579, Gresham inherited estates in and around Surrey, including Titsey Place. He was knighted in the Royal Gardens of Whitehall before the coronation of King James I on 23 July 1603. Shortly after, he was involved in a legal dispute with his sister alleging slander in connection with his inheritance of Titsey. In 1604 he was elected as a member of parliament for Gatton. He was re-elected as one of the members for Gatton in 1614 and 1621 and Bletchingley in 1625.

Gresham married Mary Leonard (ca. 1549–1620), the daughter of John Leonard (1506–1590) and Elizabeth Harmon (1520–1585) on 23 August 1587. Their son and heir was Sir Edward Gresham.

== Notes ==
Parliament of England
Preceded by Sir Matthew Browne; Richard Sondes	Member of Parliament for Gatton; 1604–1622; With: Sir Nicholas Saunders 1604–1611; Sir John Brooke 1614; Sir Thomas Bludder 1621–1622	Succeeded by Sir Edmund Bowyer; Samuel Owfield
