= Thomas Michell =

16th-century English politician

Thomas Michell (by 1492 – will proven 1551), of Worth, Sussex, was an English politician.

He was a member (MP) of the parliament of England for Reigate in 1529.
