= William Howard (died 1600) =

English politician

William Howard (1538–1600), of Lingfield, Surrey, was an English politician.

He was a Member (MP) of the Parliament of England for Reigate in 1559, 1563, 1571, 1572, 1584, 1586, 1589, 1593 and 1597.
