= John Vaughan-Morgan, Baron Reigate =

British Conservative Party politician

The Right Honourable The Lord Reigate PC

Member of Parliament for Reigate
- In office 23 February 1950 – 29 May 1970
- Preceded by: Constituency redrawn
- Succeeded by: Geoffrey Howe

Member of the House of Lords Lord Temporal
- In office 2 July 1970 – 26 January 1995; Life Peerage

Personal details
- Born: 2 February 1905
- Died: 26 January 1995 (aged 89)

John Kenyon Vaughan-Morgan, Baron Reigate, PC (2 February 1905 – 26 January 1995), known as Sir John Vaughan-Morgan, Bt, between 1960 and 1970, was a British Conservative Party politician.

== Family and early life ==
Vaughan-Morgan was the younger son of Sir Kenyon Pascoe Vaughan-Morgan, an army officer and Conservative member of parliament. His great-uncle was the Liberal politician Octavius Vaughan Morgan. He was educated at Eton College and Christ Church, Oxford.

== Career ==
In 1928 he entered politics when he was elected to Chelsea Borough Council in London, and was chairman of East Fulham Conservative Association, the constituency previously represented by his father, from 1935 to 1938.

In 1940 he married Emily Cross of New York City. The Second World War had broken out in 1939, and shortly after his marriage Vaughan-Morgan enlisted in the Welsh Guards. He spent the next five years in continuous active service outside the United Kingdom, ending the war as a staff officer for the 21st Army Group.

After the war he was elected to the London County Council to represent Chelsea in 1946, remaining on the council until 1952. At the 1950 general election he was elected to the Commons as Member of Parliament for Reigate in Surrey, holding the seat for twenty years until his retirement at the 1970 election. In 1957, he was Parliamentary Secretary to the Ministry of Health, and a Minister of State at the Board of Trade from 1957 to 1959. Following the 1959 general election he returned to the backbenches.

== Honours and arms ==
He was created a baronet, of Outwood in the County of Surrey, in the New Year Honours 1960 "for political and public services", and was appointed to the Privy Council in the 1961 Birthday Honours.

Following his retirement from the Commons, he was created a life peer as Baron Reigate, of Outwood in the County of Surrey on 2 July 1970. A director of a number of companies based in the City of London, he served as Master of the Worshipful Company of Merchant Taylors in 1970. He was also Chairman of the Board of Westminster Hospital from 1963 to 1974. in 1971 he was made an honorary freeman of the Borough of Reigate. He died at age 89.

Coat of arms of John Vaughan-Morgan, Baron Reigate

Crest
1st Argent and Sable a cock Gules resting the dexter claw on a bundle of twigs banded Proper (Morgan); 2nd in front of a boy's head as in the arms two spears saltirewise Proper (Vaughan).
Escutcheon
Quarterly: 1st & 4th Or five lozenges conjoined in fess Gules between three lymphads sails furled Sable colours flying of the second (Morgan); 2nd & 3rd Sable on a chevron Or between three boys' heads couped at the shoulders Proper crined Or enwrapped about the neck with a snake as many spear heads embrued Proper (Vaughan).
Supporters
Dexter a dragon Gules, sinister a camel Or with one hump.
Motto
Undeb

== Sources ==
- Leigh Rayment's Peerage Pages
- Leigh Rayment's Historical List of MPs

Parliament of the United Kingdom
Preceded by Gordon Touche	Member of Parliament for Reigate; 1950 – 1970	Succeeded by Geoffrey Howe
Baronetage of the United Kingdom
New creation	Baronet (of Outwood); 1960–1995	Extinct
