= John Pope (fl.1419–1421) =

English politician

John Pope (fl. 1419–1421) from Reigate, was an English Member of Parliament (MP). He was a Member of the Parliament of England for Reigate in 1419, 1420, and May 1421.
