= John Bavell =

English politician

John Bavell (fl. 1382–1397) was an English politician. He sat as MP for Reigate in May 1382, November 1384, 1393, 1395 and January 1397.
