= Charles Garnsworthy, Baron Garnsworthy =

British politician

Charles James Garnsworthy, Baron Garnsworthy, OBE (10 December 1906 – 5 September 1974) was a British Labour Party politician.

An insurance agent, Garnsworthy was elected a Labour member of the Surrey County Council in 1952, becoming an Alderman between 1966 and 1974. He was also leader of the Labour group on the Council.

He contested the Reigate constituency as a Labour candidate at the 1945, 1950, 1951 1955, 1959, and 1964 general elections, each time unsuccessfully. Reigate, situated in the Surrey County Council area, has traditionally been a safe seat for the Conservative Party, having only elected MPs representing that party since 1910.

Garnsworthy was appointed an Officer of the Order of the British Empire (OBE) in the 1965 New Year Honours.

On 19 September 1967, he was created a Life Peer, as Baron Garnsworthy, of Reigate in the County of Surrey.

He was appointed a Lord in Waiting by Labour Prime Minister Harold Wilson in March 1974, the same year in which Garnsworthy moved the second reading of the Rent Bill; this aimed to protect tenants living in rented furnished accommodation. At the time of his death in September 1974, aged 67, Garnsworthy was a Government spokesman on education and the environment.

He had married Joyce Morgan in 1943, but this was dissolved, and in 1973, he married Mrs Susan Farley. The couple had a baby son.
