= Richard Borgnis =

English cricketer and Royal Navy officer

Richard Hammond-Chambers-Borgnis
Personal information
- Full name: Richard Peter Hammond-Chambers-Borgnis
- Born: 25 August 1910; Newbury, Berkshire, England
- Died: 28 May 2001 (aged 90); Payron, France
- Batting: Right-handed
- Bowling: Right-arm medium
- Relatives: H. D. G. Leveson Gower (uncle)

Domestic team information
- Years: Team
- 1931: Berkshire

Career statistics
| Competition | First-class |
|---|---|
| Matches | 1 |
| Runs scored | 124 |
| Batting average | 62.00 |
| 100s/50s | 1/0 |
| Top score | 101 |
| Balls bowled | 120 |
| Wickets | 3 |
| Bowling average | 19.00 |
| 5 wickets in innings | 0 |
| 10 wickets in match | 0 |
| Best bowling | 3/38 |
| Catches/stumpings | 1/– |
- Source: Cricinfo, 7 February 2019

Richard Peter Hammond-Chambers-Borgnis MBE (25 August 1910 – 28 May 2001) was an English first-class cricketer and Royal Navy officer.

== Cricket ==
Borgis played minor counties cricket for Berkshire in 1931, making five appearances in the Minor Counties Championship. Borgnis was selected to play a first-class cricket match for the Combined Services against the touring New Zealanders at Portsmouth in 1937. In what was to be his only appearance in first-class cricket, he had what Wisden described as a "dreamlike" match. Coming into bat with the Combined Services at 18 for four, he proceeded to score a century in two and a half hours, scoring 101 of the 180 runs made in the Combined Services first-innings. He took the best bowling figures amongst the Combined Services bowlers during the New Zealanders first-innings, taking 3 for 38 from thirteen overs. He was dismissed for 23 by Jack Cowie in the Combined Services second-innings, and went wicketless in the New Zealanders second-innings, with the New Zealanders winning by 9 wickets.

== Naval career ==
Borgnis attended the Royal Naval College, Greenwich where, in 1924, he was an acting sub-lieutenant. After graduating from Greenwich, he entered into the Royal Navy. He was promoted to the permanent rank of sub-lieutenant in April 1932, with promotion to lieutenant coming in February 1933. Ill health shortly after limited any further cricket appearances, with Bognis placed on the retired list in December 1938.

He died in France in May 2001. His uncle was H. D. G. Leveson Gower.
