= Harry Cunningham Brodie =

Canadian-British Liberal Party politician and businessman

Brodie

Harry Brodie MP, circa 1906

Harry Cunningham Brodie (18 January 1875 – 27 February 1956) was a Canadian-British Liberal Party politician and businessman.

He was born in Victoria, British Columbia, the eldest son of John Brodie, of Hamsell Manor, Sussex. He was educated at Winchester School. He married in 1909, Mabel Hart, a daughter of Sir Robert Hart. They had two sons. His wife died in 1951.

== Political career ==
He was a member of the Liberal Eighty Club. Standing for the first time, he was elected Liberal MP for the Reigate Division of Surrey, at the 1906 General Election, gaining the seat from the Conservatives. He served just one parliamentary term, losing the seat back to the Conservatives at the General Election of January 1910. He did not stand for parliament again.

== Military career ==
He was a Major in the Middlesex Yeomanry (Duke of Cambridge's Hussars). During World War I, he served in Egypt in 1915–16 and France in 1917.

== Business career ==
He was a partner in the firm of Findlay, Durham & Brodie, colonial merchants. He was a director of Ohlsson's Cape Breweries Ltd, and of Ocean Marine Insurance Co. Ltd. He was Chairman of the Delagoa Bay Agency Co. Ltd and Chairman of the East Africa Engineering & Trading Co. Ltd. He was on the Council of the London Chamber of Commerce, and Chairman of the South African Section from 1943 to 1950.

Brodie died at Rolvenden in Kent on 27 February 1956, aged 81. He is buried in Putney Vale Cemetery, south west London.

Parliament of the United Kingdom
Preceded by Henry Cubitt	Member of Parliament for Reigate; 1906–January 1910	Succeeded by Richard Hamilton Rawson
