= George Gardiner (politician) =

British politician and journalist

Sir George Gardiner

Member of Parliament for Reigate
- In office 28 February 1974 – 8 April 1997
- Preceded by: Geoffrey Howe
- Succeeded by: Crispin Blunt

Personal details
- Born: George Arthur Gardiner; 3 March 1935 Witham, Essex, England
- Died: 16 November 2002 (aged 67) London, England
- Party: Conservative (before March 1997; after June 1997)
- Other political affiliations: Referendum (1997)
- Spouses: Juliet Wells (m. 1961; div. 1980) Helen Hackett (m. 1980)
- Children: 3
- Education: Balliol College, Oxford (BA)
- Profession: Journalist

Sir George Arthur Gardiner (3 March 1935 – 16 November 2002) was a British Conservative Party politician and journalist who served as the Member of Parliament (MP) for Reigate from February 1974 to 1997. Two months before the 1997 general election he defected to the Referendum Party, becoming the only MP it ever had. The party dissolved later that year, following the death of its leader, James Goldsmith.

Political scientists David Butler and Dennis Kavanagh described Gardiner as "a staunch right-wing Thatcherite".

== Early life ==
Born in Witham, Essex, on 3 March 1935, Gardiner was the son of Stanley Frederick, a gasworks manager, and Ethel Emma (née Gale) Gardiner, a bookkeeper. Gardiner's parents divorced when he was 10, at the end of the Second World War. As an only child (though he would gain two half-brothers from his father's second marriage), from this point he was raised in Kent by his mother as a single parent who worked in a butcher's shop and lived in a cheaply rented home. He was educated at The Harvey Grammar School in Folkestone and at Balliol College, Oxford, where he read Philosophy, Politics and Economics (PPE) and gained a first-class honours degree in 1958. Before his period at Oxford University, he did his national service, and was a sergeant tester of entrants, posted to the Pioneer Corps.

Gardiner joined the Conservative Party in 1950; at Oxford University he organised a petition in support of Anthony Eden's Suez policy. Gardiner became secretary of the University Conservative Association in 1957. During an election for the post of president of the association, he printed scores of forged ballot papers for a postal vote backing his own candidacy. His deception was discovered and he had to withdraw.

== Career ==
He worked as a journalist after he left university. He was political correspondent for the Western Daily Press from 1961 to 1964, and then was chief lobby correspondent for Thomson Regional newspapers from 1964 to 1974. Whilst there he was mistrusted by some of his colleagues because of his close affiliation with the Conservatives. From 1978 to 1989, Gardiner had a column in the Sunday Express.

He stood unsuccessfully as Conservative candidate for Coventry South at the 1970 general election, in which he distanced himself from the anti-immigration rhetoric of Enoch Powell and built a close relationship with the local Sikh community.

Like Powell, in later life Gardiner was well known for his vehemently Eurosceptic views, but earlier he had supported Britain's entry into the European Community (EC). He was a founder member of the Conservative Group for Europe, and had argued in A Europe for the Regions (1971) that the regions would benefit from entry into the EC.

=== Member of Parliament ===
On 22 January 1973, the local Conservative Party in Reigate selected Gardiner as their Prospective Parliamentary Candidate, and he was elected as the Conservative Member of Parliament (MP) for Reigate, a safe seat, on 28 February 1974. He served as MP for the constituency for the next 23 years.

Although a right-wing Conservative, Gardiner was a Heath loyalist after the 1972 economic U-turn to combat rising unemployment, which produced the Barber Boom by injecting more spending yet cutting taxes. After the party's fall from government at the February 1974 general election he remained loyal, but after another party defeat in the October 1974 election he concluded that Heath had to resign, and sought a replacement within the Conservative Party.

Gardiner was always proudest of the role he played in the election of Margaret Thatcher as Conservative Party leader. Along with Thatcher, Norman Tebbit and Airey Neave, he formed what was dubbed by the Tribune newspaper 'The Gang of Four' in her leadership race.

In 1975, Gardiner wrote a biography of Thatcher, named From Childhood to Leadership. However, despite his long, enthusiastic and loyal support, Thatcher never offered Gardiner a ministerial or front bench position during her years as party leader or as Prime Minister.

From the 1979 general election, the first of four terms of Conservative government, Gardiner was vociferous in urging the government to go faster on trade union reform and rebuked the government when it climbed down over pit closures after threats of industrial action from the National Union of Mineworkers. In March 1985, he urged the government to abolish wage councils, which took some time to implement, as in some industries, wage councils formed the backbone of trade union negotiations, and it occurred only in September 1993.

He shared an office in the 1980s at Westminster with fellow right-wing Conservative (and later UKIP leader) Neil Hamilton, then-MP for Tatton.

Gardiner became a leading member of the Monday Club. In 1984, he was a member of the Club's National Executive Council and was also Chairman of the Privatisation Policy Committee, which produced, in September 1984, a policy paper entitled Killing the Dinosaur of State Ownership.

He was on the editorial board that prepared the Club's October 1985 Conservative Party Conference issue of their newspaper, Right Ahead and contributed an article: 'Why Margaret – Still?' in support of Margaret Thatcher. Gardiner continued writing for the Club, and in the October 1989 edition of Right Ahead, he contributed the leading front-page article entitled 'Murders that should lie on the conscience of MPs', calling for the return of capital punishment.

When in November 1990, Margaret Thatcher was on the verge of resignation, Gardiner led a last gasp deputation of loyal MPs to Number 10 to try to persuade her to fight on. She listened politely to their pleas, but her mind was already made up and she announced her departure the following day. Gardiner was rewarded with a knighthood in her resignation honours list. He voted for her chosen successor, John Major, in the leadership contest to replace her. Major defeated Michael Heseltine and Douglas Hurd to become Prime Minister and Conservative party leader. However, Gardiner later became disillusioned with Major for his apparent lack of Thatcherite beliefs and plotted against him. He was vice-president of the conservative Selsdon Group, named after the shadow cabinet meeting in January 1970 at the Selsdon Park Hotel, which introduced then-radical free market policy ideas to the Conservative Party. In 1986, Gardiner was elected to the 1922 Committee executive. He left the Monday Club in January 1991, after his friend, David Storey, was ousted as chairman during a period of infighting.

Attempting to preserve the party's Thatcherite philosophy undiluted, Gardiner was instrumental in setting up the Conservative Way Forward group, with the express aim of providing a focal point for supporting those seen as ideologically sympathetic to Thatcherism in the government: including Michael Portillo and John Redwood. Some credit the organisation with success in ensuring a shift to the right in the new prospective parliamentary candidates being selected within the party after 1992.

In February 1994, Gardiner was given short shrift by Major after it was disclosed by the press that a delegation of MPs he led intended to tell Major that he must promote key right-wing ministers as a condition of their continued support. In July 1994, Gardiner left the Church of England and became a Roman Catholic in protest against the Anglican church's ordination of women priests.

In the July 1995 leadership election contest, Gardiner voted for John Redwood as party leader. After Redwood was defeated, Gardiner told Major to bring him back to the cabinet, which Major refused to do.

Gardiner resigned from the Conservative Party after being deselected by his local party association. He had previously survived a deselection attempt on 28 June 1996, but an article six months later in the Sunday Express, where he compared Major to a ventriloquist's dummy for the government's pro-European Chancellor Kenneth Clarke proved to be the last straw for his constituency party, and Gardiner was deselected as Conservative candidate for the next general election, by 291 votes to 226 votes, on 30 January 1997.

After unsuccessfully challenging the decision in the courts, on 8 March 1997, Gardiner joined the Referendum Party and was its candidate in the 1997 general election. He was, for two weeks, the only person ever to have sat as a Referendum Party MP.

On 1 May 1997, Gardiner stood in Reigate as a Referendum Party candidate. He was defeated, obtaining 7% of the vote. He came fourth out of six candidates.

== Later life ==
After William Hague became Conservative party leader in June 1997, Gardiner rejoined the Conservatives. Two years later, in 1999, he published his autobiography covering mainly his years in politics, named A Bastard's Tale, a reference to Major's remark six years earlier to Michael Brunson, but it touched upon his life before becoming an MP.

In Gardiner's 1999 memoir, he described John Major as 'a walking disaster' and a 'Walter Mitty' with no beliefs.

== Personal life ==
Gardiner married twice. His first marriage was in Bristol on 18 February 1961 to the historian Juliet Wells with whom he had two sons and a daughter. This marriage broke up just before the 1979 general election, and was formally dissolved in 1980. His second marriage was in London on 19 September 1980 to (Daphne) Helen Hackett. There were no children from his second marriage.

=== Health and death ===
In July 1982, Gardiner underwent a heart by-pass operation.

Gardiner died at St George's Nursing Home, Westminster, on 16 November 2002, aged 67, of polycystic kidney disease and chronic renal failure. He was buried nine days later, in Brompton Cemetery, London.

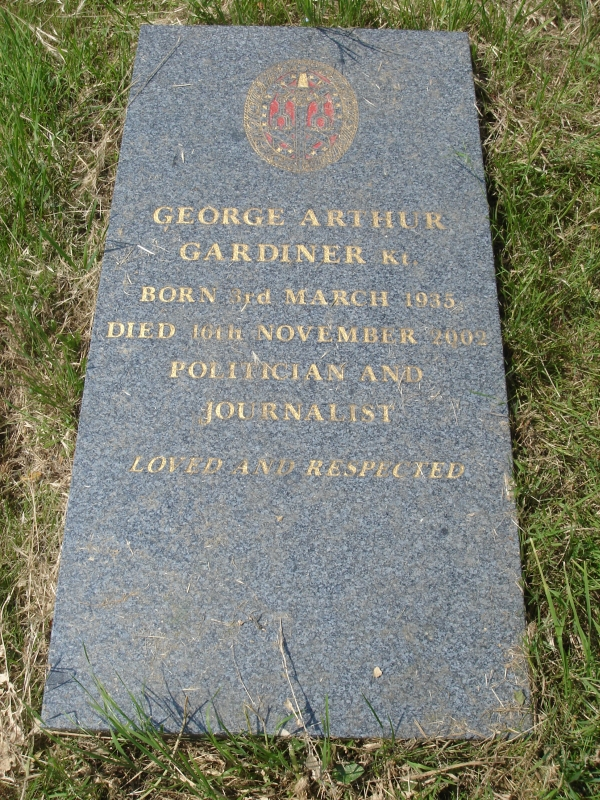
Funerary monument, Brompton Cemetery, London

Parliament of the United Kingdom
Preceded by Geoffrey Howe	Member of Parliament for Reigate; Feb 1974–1997	Succeeded by Crispin Blunt
