= John Skinner (cricketer) =

English cricketer

Personal information
- Full name: John Skinner
- Born: 16 July 1850; Steyning, Sussex, England
- Died: 17 February 1926 (aged 75); Steyning, Sussex, England
- Batting: Right-handed
- Bowling: Left-arm roundarm fast

Domestic team information
- Years: Team
- 1873–1882: Sussex

Career statistics
Competition	First-class
Matches	10
Runs scored	41
Batting average	2.56
100s/50s	–/–
Top score	10
Balls bowled	880
Wickets	16
Bowling average	29.93
5 wickets in innings	–
10 wickets in match	–
Best bowling	4/95
Catches/stumpings	6/–
- Source: Cricinfo, 17 December 2011

John Skinner (16 July 1850 – 17 February 1926) was an English cricketer. Skinner was a right-handed batsman who bowled left-arm roundarm fast. The son of Richard Skinner, a master tailor, he was born at Steyning, Sussex.

Skinner made his first-class debut for Sussex against Kent in 1873. Over the next decade he played infrequently for Sussex, making nine further first-class appearances, the last of which came against Hampshire in 1882. In his ten first-class matches, he scored 41 runs at an average of 2.56, with a high score of 10. With the ball, he took 16 wickets at a bowling average of 29.93, with best figures of 4/95.

Outside of cricket he worked as a tailor, but also coached cricket at Marlborough College. At the time of the 1881 census, he was living at the Tailor's Shop in Steyning, with his father Richard, then aged 60 and his mother Jane, then aged 64. His unmarried brothers Ernest and Harry, as well as his unmarried sister Fanny were also living there. He died at the town of his birth on 17 February 1926.
