= John Skinner (died 1584) =

English politician

John Skinner (c. 1535 – 1584), of Reigate, Surrey was an English politician.

He was a member of the Parliament of England (MP) for Reigate in 1559 and 1572.
