= Richard Hamilton Rawson =

British Army officer and politician

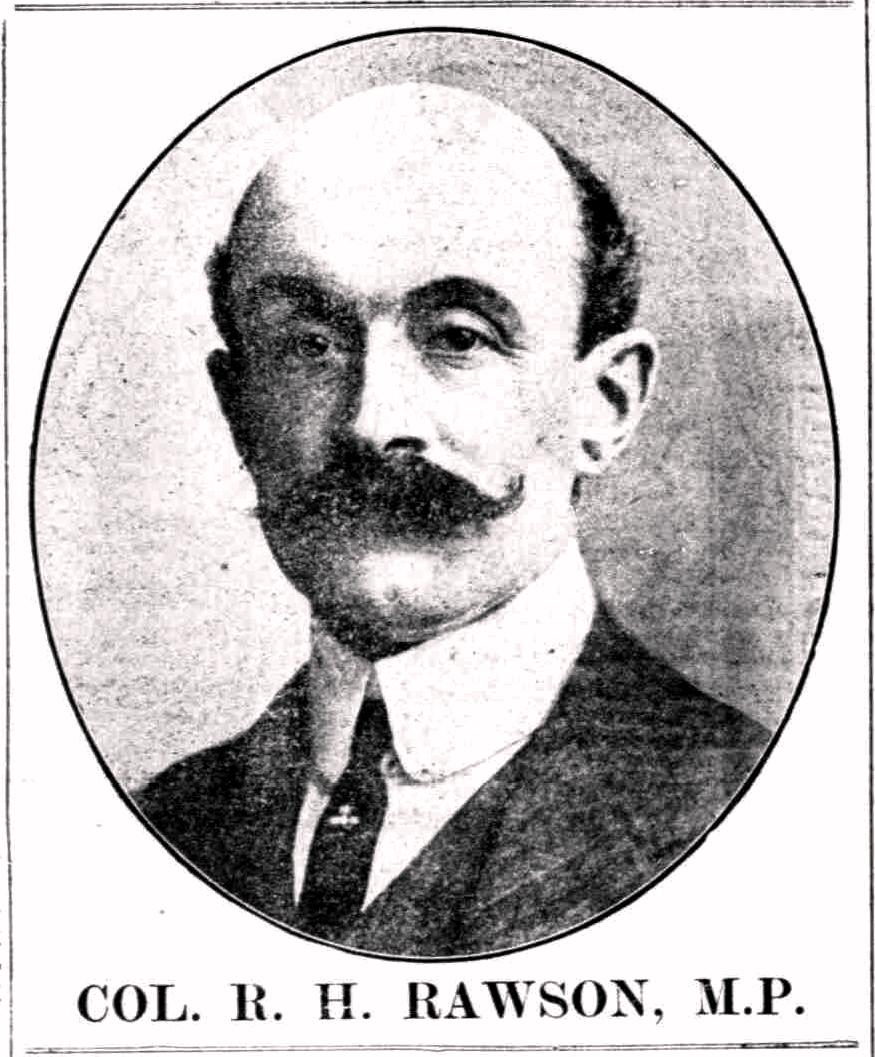
Colonel Rawson in 1910, following his election to Parliament

Colonel Richard Hamilton Rawson, JP, DL (21 February 1863 – 11 October 1918) was a British Army officer and later a Conservative and National Party politician.

== Personal life ==
Rawson was born in Aigburth, Lancashire, the son of Philip Rawson and his wife Octavia, née Gilmour.

He attended Eton College, and Brasenose College, Oxford. A keen cricketer, he played for the Eton Ramblers. After Oxford, he joined the 1st Regiment of Life Guards (now Life Guards) until he retired, with the rank of captain, in 1892. He later joined the Sussex Yeomanry, and in 1909, was given command of the regiment with the rank of Hon. Colonel.

Following this, he was appointed High Sheriff for Sussex in 1899, and was a Justice of the Peace and from 1900 a Deputy Lieutenant of the county.

He married Lady Beatrice Anson, the second daughter of Thomas Anson, 2nd Earl of Lichfield, in 1890 at St George's, Hanover Square. Lady Beatrice was the granddaughter of James Hamilton, 1st Duke of Abercorn and a founding member, along with Lady Montagu of Beaulieu, of the Ladies' Automobile Club.

Together they had three children. Richard Geoffrey Hamilton Rawson, also educated at Eton, died young as a result of a horse-riding accident, leaving a son. The eldest daughter, Beatrice Violet Rawson (later Lady Leconfield) married Charles Wyndham, and went on to live at Petworth House, Sussex. It was during this time that much of Petworth House and the surrounding estate were handed over to the National Trust. Rawson's youngest daughter, Dorothy Etta Rawson (later Lady Bruntisfield) went on to marry Sir Victor Warrender, a member of Winston Churchill's war-time coalition government.

== Political career ==
After standing unsuccessfully against the Liberal Party in the 1896 and 1906 elections as a candidate for Reigate, Rawson took a prominent part in reorganising the forces of the Conservative Party in the constituency. As a result, he was successful in the 1910 general election, winning Reigate by a large majority and defeating the incumbent Liberal MP, Harry Cunningham Brodie. Reigate has been a Conservative safe seat ever since.

In 1917, unhappy with the new Lloyd George coalition government and angry at the alleged sale of honours, Rawson left the Conservative Party to join the National Party, a right-wing split from the Conservatives. Although the Party was xenophobic, a trait exacerbated by the war, many National Party policies were progressive and years ahead of their time; they included a call for "honest politics", increased rights for employees and help for soldiers reintegrating into civilian life.

== Death ==
Colonel Rawson died in Belgravia a month before the Armistice was signed, ending the First World War, and consequently never saw victory. He was still MP for Reigate at the time. The National Party was disbanded soon after.
