= Titsey Place =

Country house in Titsey, Surrey, England, UK

Titsey Place and Gardens
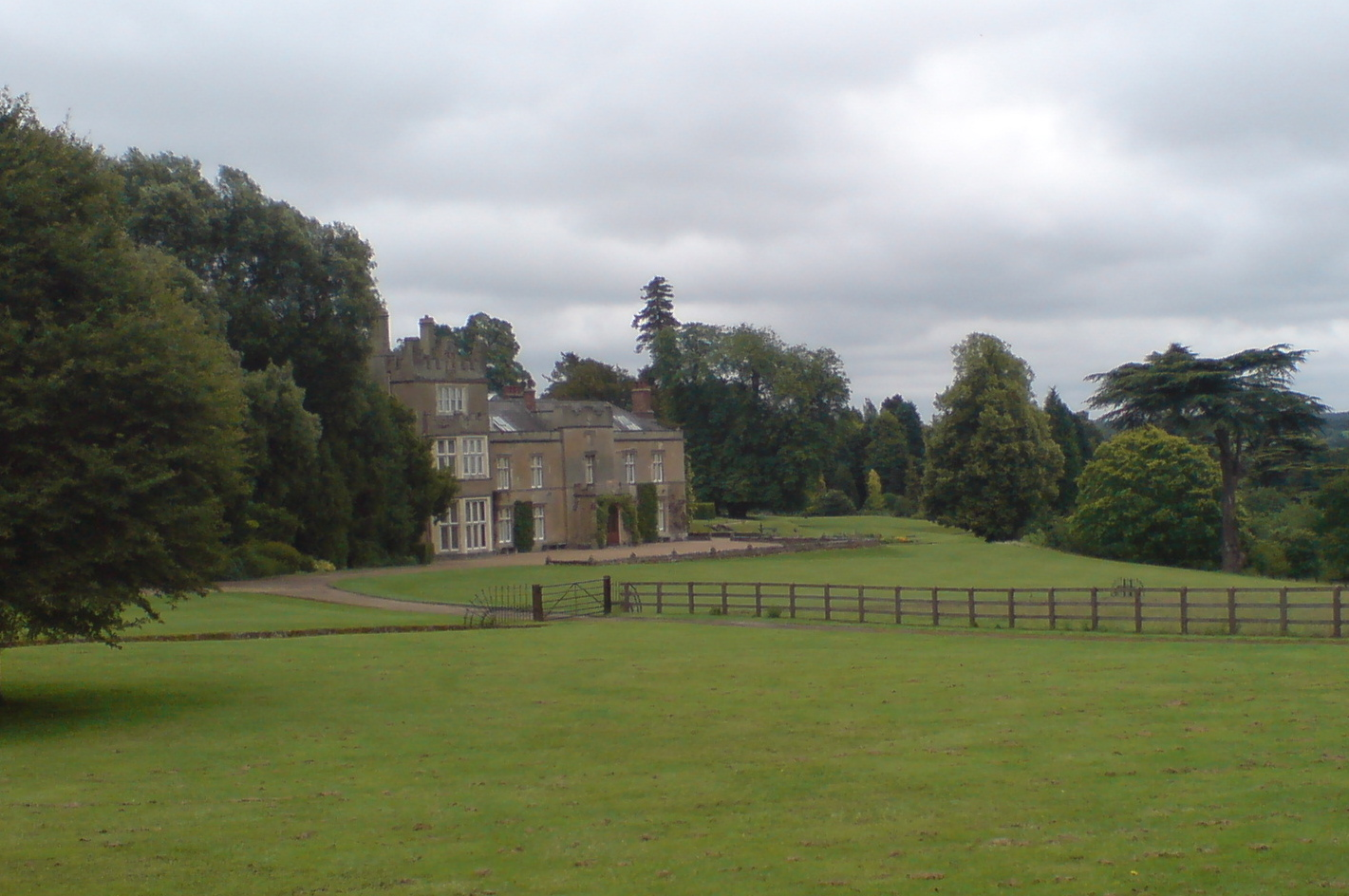
- Titsey Place, front view of main house
- Interactive map of Titsey Place and Gardens
- Type: Charitable trust
- Location: Near Oxted in Surrey, England
- Coordinates: 51.2773°N 0.0159°E
- Area: 3,000 acres (1,200 ha)
- Created: 1979
- Operator: The Titsey Foundation
- Website: www.titsey.org

Titsey Place is an English country house near Oxted in Surrey, England. It was successively the seat of the Gresham and Leveson-Gower families and is now preserved by a charitable trust for the nation.

The house has its origins in a 16th-century house, which was built by Sir John Gresham (1495–1556) on the site of an earlier dwelling. The mostly Tudor house was demolished and rebuilt in the 18th century, before being refronted in 1826. Finally a tower was added in 1856.

== History ==
In the Middle Ages, Titsey was owned by the Uvedale family. It was then an important house in the area, and its Uvedale owners were High Sheriffs of Surrey several times between 1393 and 1464, and also several times High Sheriffs of Hampshire between 1388 and 1493.

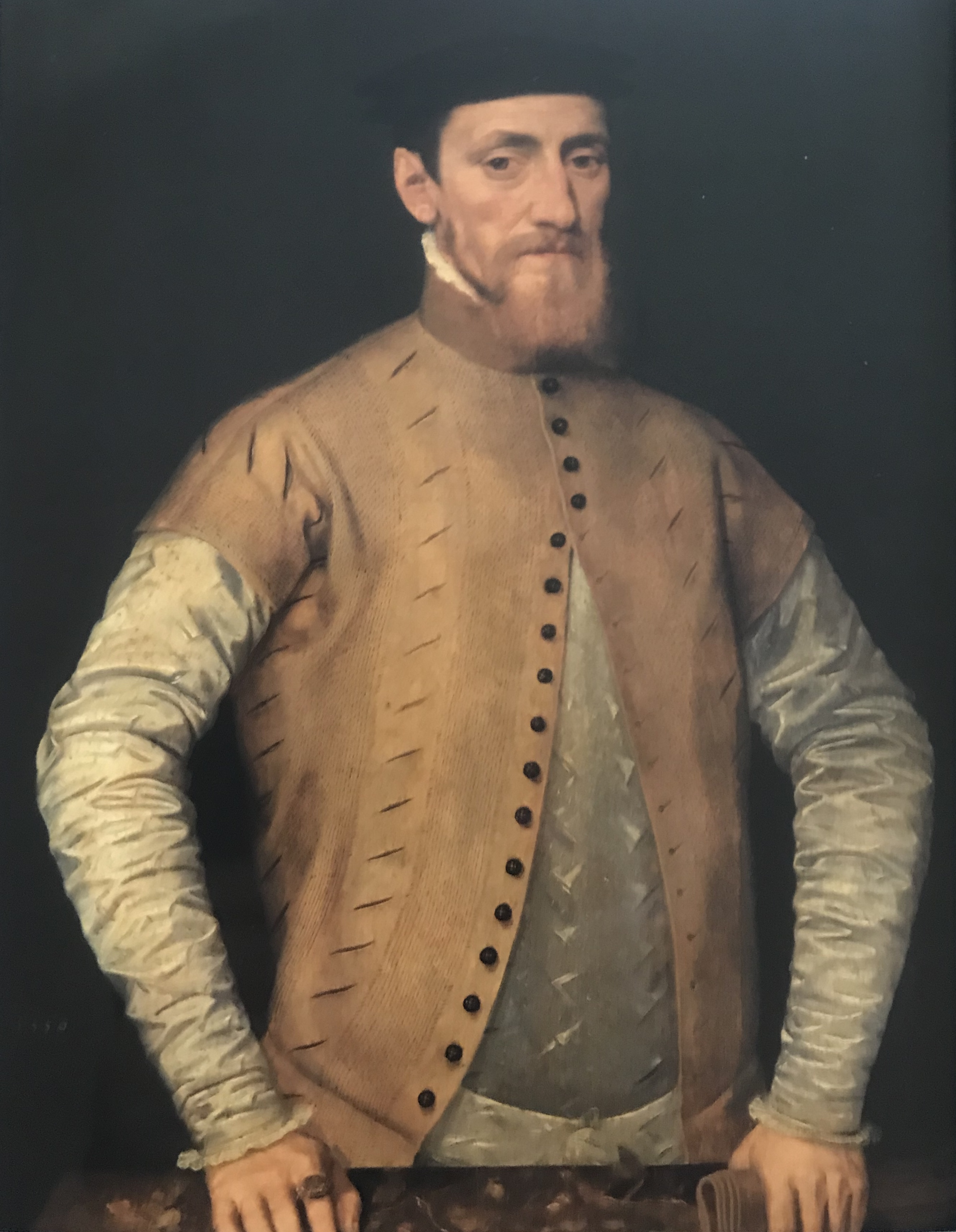
Sir John Gresham (1495–1556)

The Gresham family reached the peak of its power and wealth in the sixteenth century, and Sir John Gresham, a rich City of London merchant, acquired Titsey from the heirs of John Bourchier, 2nd Baron Berners, to whom it had been granted by Henry VIII. Gresham built a new house there near to the parish church, on the site of an older house. He was Lord Mayor of London in 1547.

Sir John Gresham's heir was William Gresham, whose son was Sir Thomas Gresham (died 1630), whose son and heir was Sir Edward Gresham. The house and estate passed through several generations of the Gresham family, who were created Baronets by Charles II at the time of his Restoration in 1660. The successive baronets were Sir Marmaduke Gresham, 1st Baronet (1627-1696), Sir Edward Gresham, 2nd Baronet (1649-1709), Sir Charles Gresham, 3rd Baronet (1660-1718), Sir Marmaduke Gresham, 4th Baronet (1700-1742), Sir Charles Gresham, 5th Baronet (died 1750), and Sir John Gresham, 6th and last Baronet (1735-1801). Through the marriage of the heiress of the last Gresham, the house passed to the Leveson-Gowers, a branch of the family of the Dukes of Sutherland.

A Tudor house on the site was demolished and rebuilt by the last Gresham baronet in the 18th century, then in 1826 was given new fronts designed by William Atkinson. A tower by Philip Charles Hardwick was added in 1856.

John Preston Neale's Views of the Seats of Noblemen and Gentlemen, in England, Wales, Scotland, and Ireland (1821) notes that "The Mansion... stands in a beautiful dell formed by a range of lofty chalk hills sheltering it from the north." A Topographical History of Surrey (1844) says of the house -

Titsey-Place, the residence of William Leveson Gower, esq., is a modern structure, pleasantly situated at an angle of the road from Limpsfield to Croydon, through Warlingham, and opposite to the present church. The ancient manor house was razed to the ground by Sir John Gresham, the last baronet, who erected the new mansion on its site. It has been greatly improved by its present owner, and has now, from the extensive plantations by which it is surrounded, a very handsome appearance. In the library is a very fine portrait of Sir Thomas Gresham, founder of the Royal Exchange, painted by Sir Antonio More...

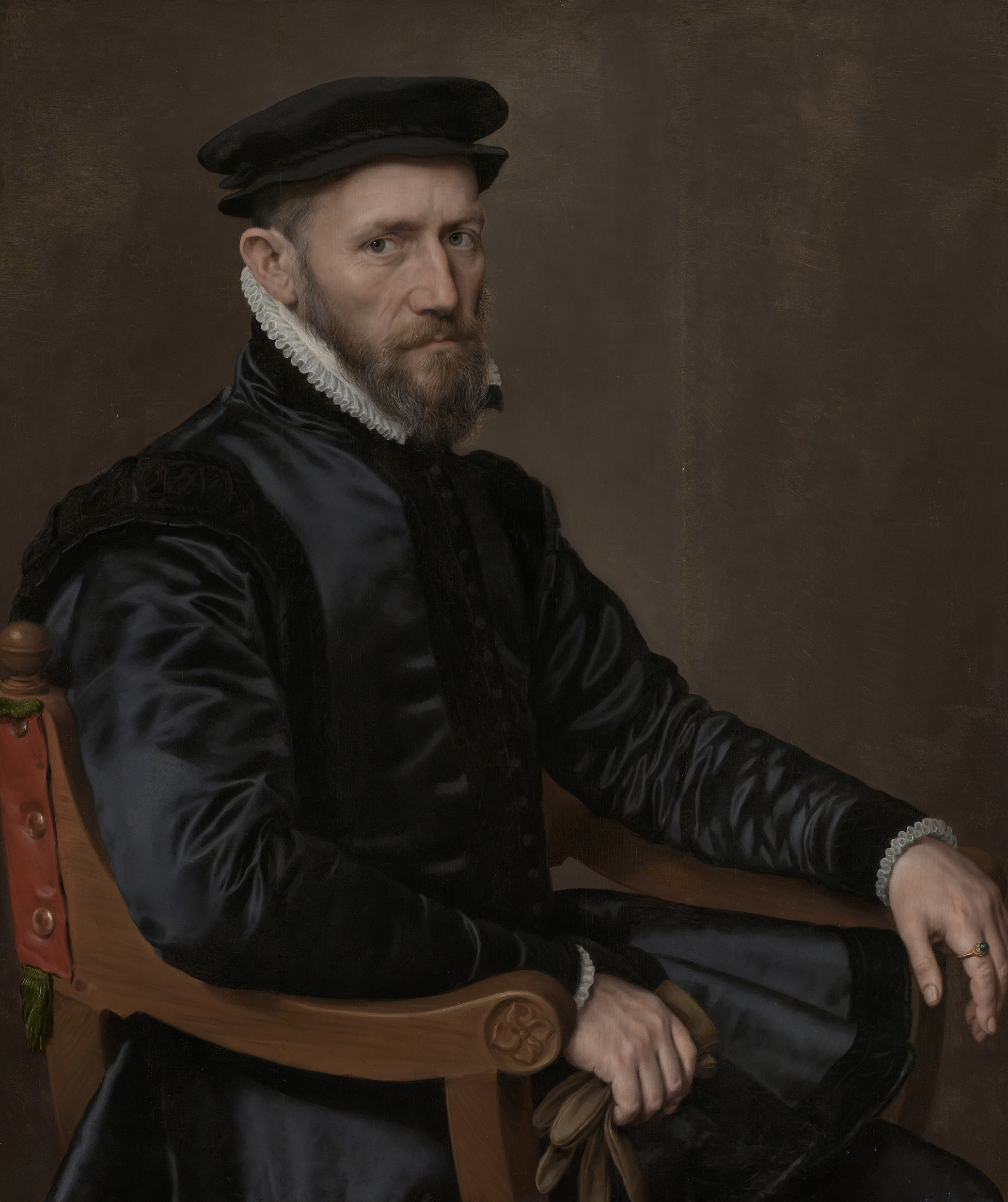
Portrait of Thomas Gresham by More, c. 1554

Many of the Uvedales are buried in the garden of Titsey Place, which contains the former parish graveyard. The last Gresham of Titsey pulled down the ancient parish church in 1776 and incorporated its site into his park. In 1865, a large yew-tree marked the location of the former church.

Sir Henry Gresham Leveson Gower (1873–1954), who was born at Titsey Place, was England cricket captain in 1909-1910. Frederick Leveson-Gower (1871–1946) also played first-class cricket.

The Leveson Gowers remained at Titsey until Thomas Leveson Gower died in 1992. By his Will, a charitable trust was established to preserve the house and gardens for the benefit of the public. The remainder of the estate was left to his heir, David Innes, who was also appointed governor of the charitable trust.

== Present day ==
=== House ===
The house is especially noted for its fine collection of family portraits, many of which are hung in the main entrance hall. The important artists Sir Joshua Reynolds and Peter Lely are represented. The new dining room has four paintings of Venice by Canaletto. The panelled sitting-room has a notable antiquarian interior and the gallery bedroom has an impressive Georgian style.

=== Gardens ===
As a result of being occupied by the British Army during the Second World War, the house and park got into a run-down state. After the war, most of the gardens were restored by Thomas Smith and his team. Smith also built up a very impressive orchid collection and grew fruit and vegetables in the kitchen-garden for the estate and to sell to greengrocers in nearby Oxted. Since 1992, the house and remainder of the gardens have been restored and the kitchen-garden has been given a more Victorian style. Both are open to the public in the summer. In the wider estate of 3,000 acres (1,200 ha), miles of woodland walks along the edge of the North Downs are used by over 20,000 visitors a year.

Titsey Place is supported by the Campaign to Protect Rural England.

== See also ==
- Titsey Woods
- London to Lewes Way (Roman road)
- Leveson-Gower
- River Eden, Kent
- Hazelwood School
