= Roger James (died 1636) =

English landowner and politician

Sir Roger James (23 Aug. 1589–1636) was an English landowner and politician who sat in the House of Commons in 1625.

James was descended from a family of Dutch brewers named van Haestricht who took the surname James after they settled in London in about 1540. He was knighted at Royston on 21 March 1613. He acquired the rectory manor of Reigate in 1614. In 1625, he was elected Member of Parliament for Reigate.

James died at the age of about 47.

On 30 January 1611, James married Margaret Aucher (d. April 1662), daughter of Anthony Aucher of Bishopsbourne, Kent. His son Roger was also later MP for Regiate.

Parliament of England
Preceded by Sir Thomas Bludder; Robert Lewis	Member of Parliament for Reigate; 1625; With: Sir Thomas Bludder	Succeeded by Sir Thomas Bludder; William Monson
