= Frederick Leveson Gower (cricketer) =

English cricketer and clergyman

Personal information
- Full name: Frederick Archibald Gresham Leveson Gower
- Born: 20 February 1871; Titsey Place, Surrey, England
- Died: 3 October 1946 (aged 75); Folkestone, Kent, England
- Batting: Right-handed
- Bowling: Unknown
- Role: Wicket-keeper
- Relatives: H. D. G. Leveson Gower (brother); Errol Holmes (son-in-law); Edward Chandos Leigh (uncle)

Domestic team information
- Years: Team
- 1891–1894: Oxford University
- 1895–1901: Marylebone Cricket Club
- 1899–1900: Hampshire

Career statistics
Competition	First-class
Matches	16
Runs scored	424
Batting average	15.70
100s/50s	–/2
Top score	86
Balls bowled	60
Wickets	–
Bowling average	–
5 wickets in innings	–
10 wickets in match	–
Best bowling	–
Catches/stumpings	12/1
- Source: Cricinfo, 3 March 2010

Frederick Archibald Gresham Leveson Gower (20 February 1871 — 3 October 1946) was an English first-class cricketer and clergyman. He was a member of the Leveson-Gower family. He played first-class cricket for several teams between 1894 and 1909, while as a clergyman he held a number of ecclesiastical posts across the South of England.

== Life and first-class cricket ==
The fifth son of Granville William Gresham Leveson-Gower, he was born in February 1871 at Titsey Place in Surrey. He was educated at Winchester College, before matriculating to Magdalen College, Oxford. While studying at Oxford, Leveson Gower made his debut in first-class cricket for Oxford University Cricket Club against Lancashire at Oxford in 1891. He appeared infrequently for Oxford, making four further first-class appearances for the university, all in 1894. He failed to gain a cricket blue at Oxford. He also played in the Gentlemen of the South v the Players of the South fixture of 1894 at Lord's. In 1895 and 1896, he played for the Marylebone Cricket Club (MCC), making three first-class appearances; two against Oxford University and one against Essex. Leveson Gower played two first-class matches for Hampshire; the first came against Sussex in the 1899 County Championship, with the second against Lancashire in the 1900 County Championship. He had been associated with Hampshire since 1891, when they were still a second-class county and had been described by Wisden as playing for Hampshire "without getting many runs, but was a useful wicket-keeper". After playing for the MCC against Yorkshire at the 1901 Scarborough Festival, Leveson Gower later appeared in two first-class matches for his brother's personal team against Cambridge and Oxford University's at The Saffrons in 1909. In sixteen first-class matches, he scored 424 runs at an average of 15.70; he made two half centuries with a highest score 86, that came for the MCC against Oxford University in 1896.

From Oxford, Leveson-Gower attended the Wells Theological College. He was ordained as a deacon in 1896, and in the same year he was appointed curate at Portsea, an appointment that lasted until 1901. He was then appointed vicar at Linton in Kent in 1901. Having been vicar at Linton for twelve years, he was appointed reverend at Singleton in Sussex in July 1913. During the First World War, he was made a temporary Chaplain, 4th Class, with the Royal Army Chaplains' Department. Leveson Gower died at Folkestone in October 1946. His younger brother, H. D. G. Leveson Gower, was a Test cricketer, while his uncle, Edward Chandos Leigh, also played first-class cricket.
