= Thomas Ballard (fl. 1388) =

English politician

Thomas Ballard (fl. 1388), was an English Member of Parliament (MP).

He was a Member of the Parliament of England for Reigate in February 1388. Nothing more is recorded of him.
