= Thomas Windsor (MP for Reigate) =

16th-century English politician

Thomas Windsor (by 1517 – c. 1567), of Bentley, Hampshire and London, was an English politician.

He was a member (MP) of the parliament of England for Reigate in 1555.
