= Edward Thurland =

English lawyer and politician

Edward Thurland (22 February 1607 – 14 January 1683) was an English lawyer and politician who sat in the House of Commons at various times between 1640 and 1673.

Thurland was the son of Edward Thurland of Reigate, Surrey. He matriculated from Clare College, Cambridge in 1624 and was admitted at Inner Temple on 20 October 1625. He was called to the bar in 1634.

In April 1640, Thurland was elected Member of Parliament for Reigate in the Short Parliament. He was a Bencher of his Inn in 1652, and was re-elected MP for Reigate in 1659 for the Third Protectorate Parliament.

In 1660, Thurland was elected MP for Reigate in the Convention Parliament. He was re-elected in 1661 for the Cavalier Parliament and sat until 1673. Also in 1661, he became Recorder of Reigate and Guildford. He was solicitor-general to James, Duke of York and was knighted on 22 April 1665. He became King's Counsel in 1668 and serjeant-at-law in 1672. In 1673 he became a Baron of the Exchequer which post he held until 1679.

Thurland died at the age of 76 and was buried at Reigate.

Thurland married Elizabeth Wright of Buckland Surrey.

Parliament of England
Vacant Parliament suspended since 1629	Member of Parliament for Reigate; 1640; With: Thomas Bludder	Succeeded by William Lord Monson; George Evelyn
Preceded by John Goodwin	Member of Parliament for Reigate; 1659; With: John Hele	Succeeded by William Lord Monson
