= John Chaunce (fl. 1406–1409) =

Member of the Parliament of England

John Chaunce (fl. 1406–1409) of Reigate, Surrey, was an English Member of Parliament for Reigate in 1406, 1407, 1417 and 1419.
