= William Bone (MP) =

14th-century Member of the Parliament of England

William Bone (fl. 1380–1391) was an English Member of Parliament (MP).

He was a Member of the Parliament of England for Reigate in January 1380, September 1388, January 1390 and 1391. Nothing is recorded of William Bone, but his family seem to have had roots in Reigate, and their name was given to some land there.
