= Roger Chaunce (fl. 1377–1399) =

Roger Chaunce (fl. 1377–1399), of Reigate, Surrey, was an English Member of Parliament (MP).

He was a Member of the Parliament of England for Reigate in October 1377, 1378, January 1380, 1391 and 1399.
