= John Agmondesham (died 1573) =

English politician

- Born: 1511
- Died: 1573 (aged 61–62)
- Occupation: politician

John Agmondeham (c. 1511 – 1573), of Rowbarns, East Horsley, Surrey, was an English politician.

== Biography ==
He was a son of Henry Agmondesham by his wife Elizabeth. He married Margaret, daughter of William Everard of Albourne, Sussex, and had two sons, one of which was John II, and one daughter.

He was a member (MP) of the parliament of England for Reigate in 1571.
