= Robert Richers =

16th-century English politician

Arms of Robert Richers (Richers of Swannington in Norfolk): Argent, three annulets azure, as seen on the monument to his son-in-law Sir Robert Houghton in St Mary's Church, Shelton, Norfolk

Robert Richers (by 1524 – 1587/89) (aliter Rychers, etc.), of Lincoln's Inn, London and Wrotham, Kent, was a lawyer who served as a Member of Parliament for Reigate in Surrey in 1547, April 1554 and November 1554, and for Grampound in Cornwall in 1558.

== Life ==
He was a son of Henry Richers of Swannington in Norfolk, of an old gentry family, by his wife Cecily Tills, a daughter of Robert Tills of Runhall in Norfolk. He studied law at Lincoln's Inn and was called to the bar in 1544. He died at some time before 12 February 1589, when his will was proved.

== Marriage and issue ==
At some time before November 1553 he married Elizabeth Cartwright, a daughter of Edmund Cartwright of Ossington in Nottinghamshire, by his wife Agnes Cranmer, a daughter of Thomas Cranmer of Sutton in Nottinghamshire, and the widow of Reginald Peckham (d.1551) of Yaldham in Kent. By his wife he had one son and five daughters, including:

- Mary Richers, who married Sir Robert Houghton (1548–1624), of Lincoln's Inn and Norwich, Norfolk, a Judge of the King's Bench and a Member of Parliament for Norwich in 1593, the third son of John Houghton of Gunthorpe, Norfolk, by his wife Agnes Playford, a daughter of Robert Playford of Brinton, Norfolk. Mary erected the surviving mural monument to her husband in St Mary's Church, Shelton, Norfolk, on which are shown her paternal arms of Richers: Argent, three annulets azure.
