= John Skinner (died c. 1543) =

16th-century English politician

John Skinner (by 1486 – 1543?) of Reigate, Surrey, was an English politician.

He was a member (MP) of the parliament of England for Reigate in 1529.
