= John Skinner (died 1571) =

16th-century English politician

Member of Parliament for Reigate
- In office 1542–1542

Member of Parliament for Surrey
- In office 1555–1558

Personal details
- Born: c. 1509 Reigate, Surrey, England
- Died: 16 November 1571 Surrey, England
- Occupation: Politician
- Known for: Member of Parliament for Reigate and Surrey

John Skinner (by 1509 – 16 November 1571), of Reigate, Surrey, was an English politician.

He was a Member (MP) of the Parliament of England for Reigate in 1542 and for Surrey in 1555 and 1558.
