= John Aubyn, junior =

English politician (fl. 1384–1393)

John Aubyn (fl. 1384–1393), of Reigate, Surrey, was an English politician.

Aubyn is thought to have been the son of John Aubyn, senior, MP for Reigate in January 1377, 1378 and October 1382. Aubyn was described as 'the elder' in 1393, indicating he had an adult son also named John Aubyn.

He was a Member (MP) of the Parliament of England for Reigate in April 1384, 1385, 1386, September 1388, January 1390 and 1393.
