= John Chaunce (fl. 1363–1388) =

Member of the Parliament of England

John Chaunce (fl. 1363–1388) of Reigate, Surrey, was an English Member of Parliament for Reigate in 1363, 1366, 1368, 1372, May 1382, November 1384 and February 1388.
