= William Monson, 1st Viscount Oxenbridge =

British politician (1829–1898)

The Right Honourable The Viscount Oxenbridge PC
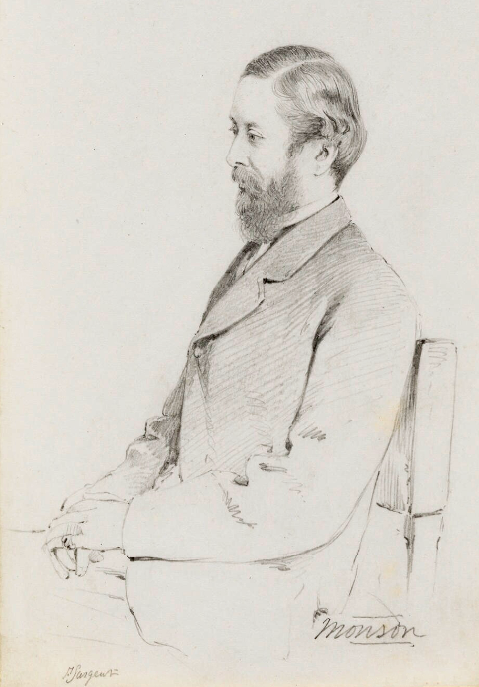

Captain of the Yeomen of the Guard
- In office 3 May 1880 – 9 June 1885
- Monarch: Victoria
- Prime Minister: William Ewart Gladstone
- Preceded by: The Lord Skelmersdale
- Succeeded by: The Viscount Barrington
- In office 10 February 1886 – 20 July 1886
- Monarch: Victoria
- Prime Minister: William Ewart Gladstone
- Preceded by: The Viscount Barrington
- Succeeded by: The Earl of Kintore

Personal details
- Born: 18 February 1829
- Died: 16 April 1898 (aged 69)
- Party: Liberal
- Spouse(s): Hon. Maria Maude (c. 1820–1897)

William John Monson, 1st Viscount Oxenbridge PC (18 February 1829 – 16 April 1898), known as The Lord Monson between 1862 and 1886, was a British Liberal politician. He served as Captain of the Yeomen of the Guard between 1880 and 1885 and in 1886 under William Ewart Gladstone.

== Background ==
Monson was the son of William Monson, 6th Baron Monson, and Eliza, daughter of Edmund Larken. The diplomat Sir Edmund Monson, 1st Baronet, was his younger brother. He was educated at Windlesham House School (1838–42), Eton College and Christ Church, Oxford.

== Political career ==
Monson was elected Member of Parliament for Reigate in 1858, a seat he held until he succeeded his father in the peerage in 1862 and entered the House of Lords. He served under William Ewart Gladstone as Treasurer of the Household in 1874 and as Captain of the Yeomen of the Guard between 1880 and 1885 and in 1886 and was sworn of the Privy Council in 1874. In 1886, he was created Viscount Oxenbridge, of Burton in the County of Lincoln. He again held office under Gladstone as Master of the Horse between 1892 and 1894. From 1880 to 1892 he was Chief Liberal Whip in the House of Lords.

He was appointed Honorary Colonel of the 2nd Surrey Rifle Volunteer Corps and its successor, the 1st Volunteer Battalion, Queen's Royal Regiment (West Surrey), on 18 March 1882.

== Family ==
Lord Oxenbridge married Maria, Dowager Countess of Yarborough, daughter of Cornwallis Maude, 3rd Viscount Hawarden, and widow of Charles Pelham, 2nd Earl of Yarborough, on 7 August 1869. The marriage was childless. She died in December 1897. Lord Oxenbridge only survived her by a few months and died in April 1898, aged 69. As he had no children the viscountcy became extinct on his death, while he was succeeded in the barony by his younger brother, Debonnaire Monson, 8th Baron Monson.

Parliament of the United Kingdom
Preceded by Henry Rawlinson	Member of Parliament for Reigate; 1858–1862	Succeeded by Granville Leveson-Gower
Political offices
Preceded by The Lord Poltimore	Treasurer of the Household; 1874	Succeeded by Earl Percy
Preceded by The Lord Skelmersdale	Captain of the Yeomen of the Guard; 1880–1885	Succeeded by The Viscount Barrington
Preceded by The Viscount Barrington	Captain of the Yeomen of the Guard; 1886	Succeeded by The Earl of Kintore
Preceded by The Duke of Portland	Master of the Horse; 1892–1894	Succeeded by The Earl of Cork
Party political offices
Preceded by The Earl of Bessborough	Liberal Chief Whip in the House of Lords; 1880–1892	Succeeded by The Lord Kensington
Peerage of the United Kingdom
New creation	Viscount Oxenbridge; 1886–1898	Extinct
Peerage of Great Britain
Preceded by William Monson	Baron Monson; 1862–1898	Succeeded by Debonnaire Monson
Baronetage of England
Preceded by William Monson	Baronet (of Carleton); 1862–1898	Succeeded by Debonnaire Monson
