= Roger Chaunce (fl. 1414–1429) =

Roger Chaunce (fl. 1414-1429), was an English Member of Parliament (MP).

He was a Member of the Parliament of England for in November 1414, December 1421 and 1429.
