= Reigate (constituency) =

Parliamentary constituency in the United Kingdom, 1885 onwards

Coordinates: 51.27°N 0.20°W

- Borough constituency for the House of Commons
- Boundaries since 2024
- Boundary of Reigate in South East England
- County: Surrey
- Electorate: 77,101 (2024)
- Major settlements: Reigate; Redhill; Banstead

Current constituency
- Created: 1885
- Member of Parliament: Rebecca Paul (Conservative)
- Seats: One
- Created from: Parts of East, Mid and West Surrey as county constituency also called S.E. Surrey

1832–1868
- Seats: One
- Type of constituency: Borough constituency
- Replaced by: Mid Surrey

1295–1832
- Seats: Two
- Type of constituency: Borough constituency

Reigate (/ˈraɪɡeɪt/) is a constituency (Note: A borough constituency (for the purposes of election expenses and type of returning officer)) in Surrey represented in the House of Commons of the UK Parliament since 2024 by Rebecca Paul, of the Conservative Party. (Note: As with all constituencies, the constituency elects one Member of Parliament (MP) by the first past the post system of election at least every five years)

== Constituency profile ==
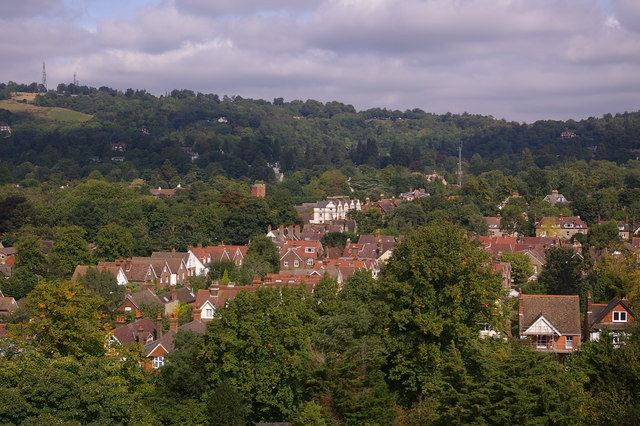
View over Reigate from St Mary's Church

Reigate is a constituency in Surrey in South East England. Most of its population live in the connected towns of Reigate and Redhill, which together have around 60,000 residents. Other settlements include the town of Banstead and the villages of Tadworth, Kingswood and Chipstead.

This is a highly-affluent, suburban constituency located just outside Greater London, around 17 miles (27 km) south of the centre of the capital, placing it within the London commuter belt. Traditionally a rural, agricultural area, Reigate and its nearby settlements were mostly developed during the Victorian era after the arrival of road and rail from London. The Surrey Hills, a National Landscape of rolling downland, passes through the constituency between Reigate and Banstead. This gives the area a leafy, suburban character with most residents living in large detached or semi-detached homes; the average house price across the constituency is almost double the nationwide average.

The Reigate constituency has a low proportion of young adults and an above-average population of middle-aged adults and young families. Levels of income and homeownership are high and the child poverty rate is less than half the UK-wide rate. Residents are generally well-educated and a high proportion work in the health and finance sectors. The percentage claiming unemployment benefits is around half the national rate. White people made up 84% of the population at the 2021 census.

At the local council level, Reigate and Redhill are mostly represented by Green Party councillors with some Liberal Democrats, whilst Banstead and its surroundings primarily elected Conservatives with some localists. An estimated 52% of voters in the constituency supported remaining in the European Union in the 2016 referendum, higher than the UK-wide figure of 48%.

== Boundaries ==
=== Historic ===
Map of 2010–2024 boundaries

1885–1918: The Borough of Reigate, its Sessional Division, and those of Dorking and Godstone except Effingham, Mickleham, Caterham, Warlingham, Chelsham and Farleigh

1918–1950: The Borough of Reigate, the Urban District of Dorking, and the Rural Districts of Dorking and Reigate

1950–1974: The Borough of Reigate, and the Rural District of Godstone

1974: what had been the Rural District was ceded to the East Surrey seat; Banstead U.D. was taken from the Carshalton seat

1974–1983: The Borough of Reigate, and the Urban District of Banstead

1983: The northern heart of what had been Banstead U.D. (four wards) were ceded to the Epsom and Ewell seat

1983–1997: The Borough of Reigate and Banstead wards of Chipstead Hooley and Woodmansterne, Horley East, Horley West, Kingswood with Burgh Heath, Reigate Central, Reigate East, Reigate North, Reigate North Central, Reigate North East, Reigate South Central, Reigate South East, Reigate South West, Salfords and Sidlow, and Tadworth and Walton

1997–2010: The Borough of Reigate and Banstead wards of Banstead Village, Chipstead Hooley and Woodmansterne, Kingswood with Burgh Heath, Reigate Central, Reigate East, Reigate North, Reigate North Central, Reigate North East, Reigate South Central, Reigate South East, Reigate South West, Salfords and Sidlow, and Tadworth and Walton

2010–2024: The Borough of Reigate and Banstead wards of Banstead Village, Chipstead Hooley and Woodmansterne, Earlswood and Whitebushes, Kingswood with Burgh Heath, Meadvale and St John's, Merstham, Preston, Redhill East, Redhill West, Reigate Central, Reigate Hill, Salfords and Sidlow, South Park and Woodhatch, and Tadworth and Walton

=== Current ===
Further to the 2023 Periodic Review of Westminster constituencies, which came into effect for the 2024 general election, the constituency is now composed of the following (as they existed on 1 December 2020):

- The Borough of Reigate and Banstead wards of: Banstead Village; Chipstead, Kingswood & Woodmansterne; Earlswood & Whitebushes; Lower Kingswood, Tadworth & Walton; Meadvale & St. John's; Nork; Redhill East; Redhill West & Wray Common; Reigate; South Park & Woodhatch; Tattenham Corner & Preston.

The seat gained those parts of Reigate and Banstead Borough previously in the Epsom and Ewell constituency – including the residential areas of Nork and Tattenham Corner, offset by the transfer of the Hooley, Merstham & Netherne ward to East Surrey.

The seat is in Surrey bordering Greater London and is centered on the town of Reigate from which it takes its name. The constituency comprises the bulk of the Reigate and Banstead Borough -excluding the town of Horley which is in the new Dorking and Horley seat, and the community of Merstham, which is now part of East Surrey.

== History ==
This constituency was first created with the first election of Burgesses to Parliament in 1295, electing two members. It continued to elect two members until 1832 when its representation was reduced to one member by the Great Reform Act.

In 1868 the constituency was disenfranchised for corruption, but was revived in 1885 by the Redistribution of Seats Act 1885 when the East Surrey constituency was abolished. Since 1918 the seat has been held by a candidate in the Conservative Party with the exception of four months during which the anti-EU MP in 1997 before the election of that year joined the Referendum Party (UK). The Liberal Democrats including their two predecessor parties amassed their largest share of the vote in 2010. The largest opposition party changed from Labour to the Liberal Democrats in 2005 and 2010, then UKIP in 2015 and back to Labour in the 2017 general election.

In 1974, the seat saw major boundary changes which removed some of Eastern Surrey which was in the seat into the radically redesigned East Surrey seat and added the Banstead area to the seat.

== Members of Parliament ==
=== MPs 1295–1660 ===
Parliament	First member	Second member
1386	John Aubyn	Richard atte Mere
1388 (February)	John Chaunce I	Thomas Ballard
1388 (September)	John Aubyn	William Bone
1390 (January)	John Aubyn	William Bone
1390 (November)		
1391	Roger Chaunce I	William Bone
1393	John Aubyn	John Bavell
1394		
1395	John Skinner	John Bavell
1397 (January)	John Skinner	John Bavell
1397 (September)	John Skinner	Richard atte Mere
1399	John Skinner	Roger Chaunce I
1401		
1402	Richard Turner	Thomas Barber
1404 (January)		
1404 (October)		
1406	John Chaunce II	John Taylor
1407	John Chaunce II	Thomas Barber
1410		
1411		
1413 (February)		
1413 (May)		
1414 (April)		
1414 (November)	John Skinner	Roger Chaunce II
1415	John Skinner	Walter Wrigge
1416 (March)		
1416 (October)		
1417	John Knight	John Chaunce II
1419	John Pope	John Chaunce II
1420	John Pope	John Skinner
1421 (May)	John Pope	Walter Urry
1421 (December)	Robert Wanford	Roger Chaunce II
1432	Thomas Russell	
1510–1523	No names known	
1529	John Skinner I	Thomas Michell
1536	?	
1539	?	
1542	James Skinner	John Skinner II
1545	?	
1547	Robert Richers	William More
1553 (March)	Robert Robotham	Henry Fisher
1553 (October)	Sir Thomas Saunders	Thomas Ingler
1554 (April)	Henry White	Robert Richers
1554 (November)	Robert Richers	James Skinner
1555	Thomas Windsor	Walter Haddon
1558	George Elsden	Thomas Banester
1559	William Howard	John Skinner
1562–63	Sir George Howard	William Howard
1571	William Howard	John Agmondesham I
1572	William Howard	John Skinner
1584	William Howard	Edmund Sanders
1586	William Howard	Edmund Sanders
1588	Julius Caesar	Thomas Lyfield
1593	William Howard	John Trevor
1597	Sir William Howard	Edward Howard
1601	Edward Howard	John Trevor
1604	Sir Edward Howard	Herbert Pelham
1614	Sir Edward Howard	John Suckling
1621	Thomas Glemham	Robert Lewis
1624	Sir Thomas Bludder	Robert Lewis
1625	Sir Thomas Bludder	Sir Roger James
1626	Sir Thomas Bludder	Sir William Monson
1628	Charles Cockayne	Sir Thomas Bludder
1629–1640	No Parliaments summoned	
1640 (April)	Edward Thurland	Sir Thomas Bludder
1640 (November)	William Lord Monson	George Evelyn
1645	William Lord Monson	George Evelyn
1648	William Lord Monson	George Evelyn
1653	Reigate not represented in Barebones Parliament	
1654	Edward Bysshe	(one seat only)
1656	?John Goodwin	(one seat only)
1659	John Hele	Edward Thurland

=== MPs 1660–1832 ===
Year	First member	First party	Second member	Second party
1660	John Hele		Edward Thurland	
1661	Roger James		Edward Thurland	
1673	Roger James		Sir John Werden	
February 1679	Roger James		Deane Goodwin	
October 1679	Roger James		Ralph Freeman	
1680	Roger James		Deane Goodwin	
1681	Ralph Freeman		Deane Goodwin	
1685	Sir John Werden		Sir John Parsons	
January 1689	Roger James		Sir John Parsons	
March 1689	Roger James		Thomas Vincent	
1690	Sir John Parsons		John Parsons	
1698	Stephen Hervey		Edward Thurland	
1701	Stephen Hervey		Sir John Parsons	
1707	James Cocks	Whig	Sir John Parsons	
1710	John Ward		Sir John Parsons	
1713	James Cocks	Whig	Sir John Parsons	
1717	James Cocks	Whig	William Jordan	
1720	James Cocks	Whig	Thomas Jordan	
1722	James Cocks	Whig	Sir Joseph Jekyll	Whig
1739	James Cocks	Whig	John Hervey	
1741	James Cocks	Whig	Philip Yorke	Whig
June 1747	Charles Cocks		Philip Yorke	Whig
December 1747	Charles Cocks		Charles Yorke	Whig
1768	Charles Cocks		John Yorke	
1784	William Bellingham		Edward Leeds	
1787	William Bellingham		Reginald Pole-Carew	
1789	The Lord Hood		Reginald Pole-Carew	
1790	John Somers Cocks		Joseph Sydney Yorke	Tory
February 1806	Philip James Cocks		Joseph Sydney Yorke	Tory
November 1806	Edward Charles Cocks	Tory	Viscount Royston	Tory
1808	Edward Charles Cocks	Tory	James Cocks	Tory
1812	John Somers-Cocks	Tory	James Cocks	Tory
1818	Sir Joseph Sydney Yorke	Tory	James Somers Cocks	Tory
1823	Sir Joseph Sydney Yorke	Tory	James Cocks	Tory
April 1831	Sir Joseph Sydney Yorke	Tory	Joseph Yorke	Tory
July 1831	Charles Yorke	Tory	Joseph Yorke	Tory

=== MPs 1832–1868 ===
- Representation reduced to one (1832)

Election	Member	Party
1832	John Somers-Cocks	Tory
1834	John Somers-Cocks	Conservative
1841 by-election	Charles Somers-Cocks	Conservative
1847	Thomas Somers-Cocks	Conservative
1857	William Hackblock (Note: Hackblock died either 1 or 8 January 1858)	Independent Whig
February 1858 by-election	Henry Rawlinson	Conservative
October 1858 by-election	William Monson	Whig
1859	William Monson	Liberal
1863 by-election	Granville William Gresham Leveson-Gower	Liberal
1868	Constituency disenfranchised for corruption	

=== MPs since 1885 ===
- Constituency revived (1885)

Year	Member	Party	Notes
1885	Trevor Lawrence	Conservative	Member for Mid Surrey (1875–1885)
1892	Henry Cubitt	Conservative	
1906	Harry Brodie	Liberal	
1910	Richard Rawson	Conservative	
1917	Richard Rawson	National	
1918	George Cockerill	Unionist	
1931	Gordon Touche	Conservative	Contested Dorking following redistribution
Constituency split, majority renamed Dorking, minority merged with part of East Surrey
1950	John Vaughan-Morgan	Conservative	
1970	Geoffrey Howe	Conservative	Member for Bebington (1964–1966); Contested East Surrey following redistribution
1974	George Gardiner	Conservative	
1996	George Gardiner	Referendum	
1997	Crispin Blunt	Conservative	
2023	Crispin Blunt	Independent	
2024	Rebecca Paul	Conservative	

== Elections ==
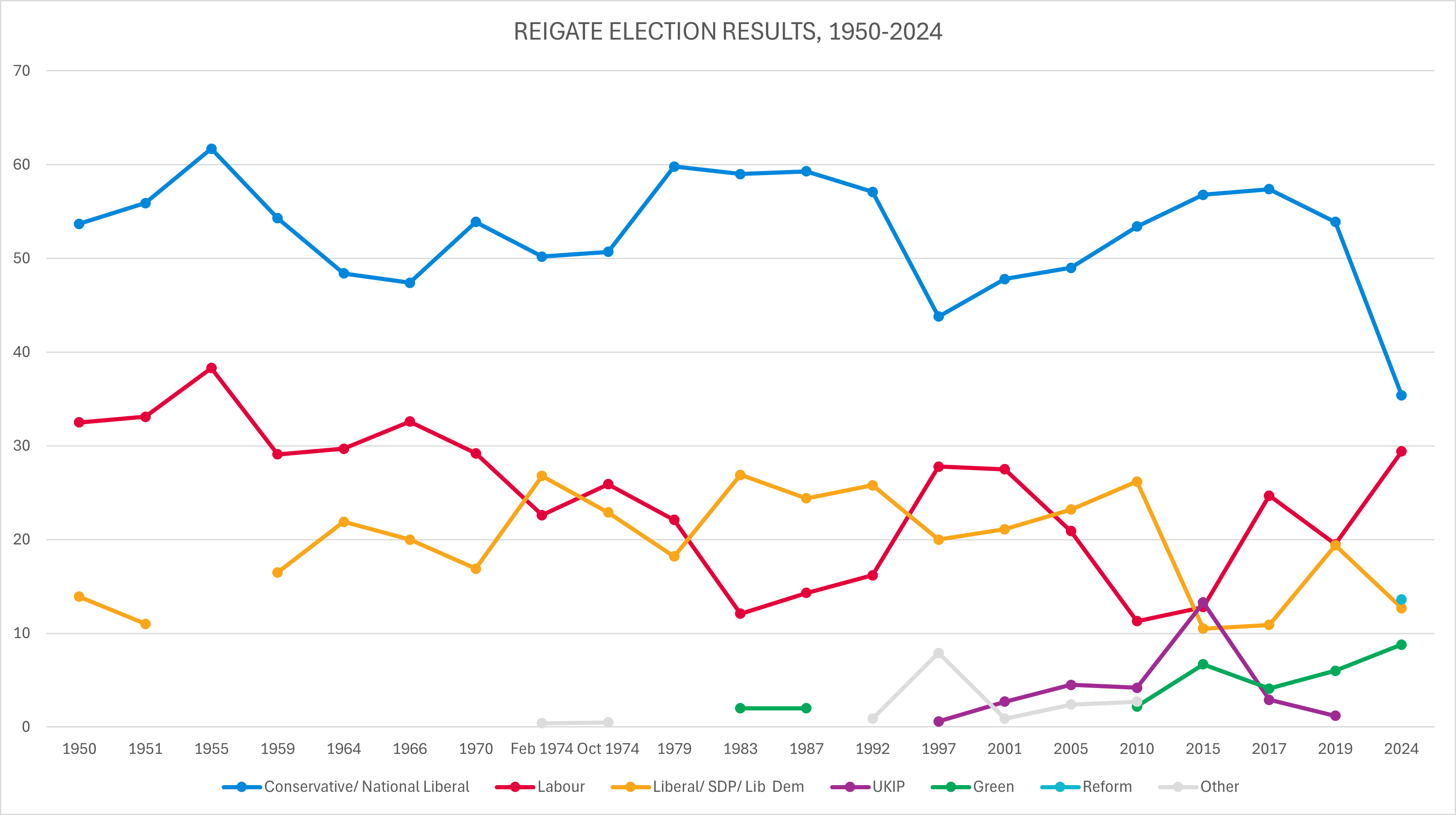
Election results 1950-2024

=== Elections in the 2020s ===
General election 2024: Reigate
Party	Candidate	Votes	%	±%
Conservative	Rebecca Paul	18,822	35.4	−20.4
Labour	Stuart Brady	15,635	29.4	+12.5
Reform	Joseph Fox	7,240	13.6	New
Liberal Democrats	Mark Johnston	6,773	12.7	−7.2
Green	Jonathan Essex	4,691	8.8	+3.0
Majority		3,187	6.0	−28.4
Turnout		53,161	69.0	−1.2
Registered electors		77,101		
Conservative hold		Swing	−16.4	

=== Elections in the 2010s ===
2019 notional result
Party	Vote	%
Conservative	29,846	55.8
Liberal Democrats	10,626	19.9
Labour	9,045	16.9
Green	3,092	5.8
Others	860	1.6
Turnout	53,469	70.2
Electorate	76,139	

General election 2019: Reigate
Party	Candidate	Votes	%	±%
Conservative	Crispin Blunt	28,665	53.9	−3.5
Labour	Susan Gregory	10,355	19.5	−5.2
Liberal Democrats	John Vincent	10,320	19.4	+8.5
Green	Jonathan Essex	3,169	6.0	+1.9
UKIP	Julia Searle	647	1.2	−1.7
Majority		18,310	34.4	+1.7
Turnout		53,156	71.0	−1.0
Registered electors				
Conservative hold		Swing	+0.9	

General election 2017: Reigate
Party	Candidate	Votes	%	±%
Conservative	Crispin Blunt	30,896	57.4	+0.6
Labour	Toby Brampton	13,282	24.7	+11.9
Liberal Democrats	Anna Tarrant	5,889	10.9	+0.4
Green	Jonathan Essex	2,214	4.1	−2.6
UKIP	Joe Fox	1,542	2.9	−10.4
Majority		17,614	32.7	−10.8
Turnout		53,993	72.0	+2.1
Registered electors				
Conservative hold		Swing	−5.7	

General election 2015: Reigate
Party	Candidate	Votes	%	±%
Conservative	Crispin Blunt	29,151	56.8	+3.4
UKIP	Joe Fox	6,817	13.3	+9.1
Labour	Ali Aklakul	6,578	12.8	+1.5
Liberal Democrats	Anna Tarrant	5,369	10.5	−15.7
Green	Jonathan Essex	3,434	6.7	+4.5
Majority		22,334	43.5	+16.3
Turnout		51,349	69.9	+0.1
Registered electors				
Conservative hold		Swing		

General election 2010: Reigate
Party	Candidate	Votes	%	±%
Conservative	Crispin Blunt	26,688	53.4	+4.8
Liberal Democrats	Jane Kulka	13,097	26.2	+3.1
Labour	Robert Hull	5,672	11.3	−10.2
UKIP	Joseph Fox	2,089	4.2	−0.3
BNP	Keith Brown	1,345	2.7	New
Green	Jonathan Essex	1,087	2.2	New
Majority		13,591	27.2	+1.4
Turnout		49,978	69.8	+5.0
Registered electors				
Conservative hold		Swing	+0.9	

=== Elections in the 2000s ===
General election 2005: Reigate
Party	Candidate	Votes	%	±%
Conservative	Crispin Blunt	20,884	49.0	+1.2
Liberal Democrats	Jane Kulka	9,896	23.2	+2.1
Labour	Samuel Townend	8,896	20.9	−6.6
UKIP	Jeremy Wraith	1,921	4.5	+1.8
English Democrat	Harold Green	600	1.4	New
Independent	Michael Selby	408	1.0	New
Majority		10,988	25.8	+5.5
Turnout		42,605	64.8	+4.6
Registered electors				
Conservative hold		Swing	−0.5	

General election 2001: Reigate
Party	Candidate	Votes	%	±%
Conservative	Crispin Blunt	18,875	47.8	+4.0
Labour	Simon Charleton	10,850	27.5	−0.3
Liberal Democrats	Jane Kulka	8,330	21.1	+1.1
UKIP	Stephen Smith	1,062	2.7	+2.1
Reform UK	Harold Green	357	0.9	New
Majority		8,025	20.3	+4.3
Turnout		39,474	60.2	−14.2
Registered electors				
Conservative hold		Swing	+2.2	

=== Elections in the 1990s ===
General election 1997: Reigate
Party	Candidate	Votes	%	±%
Conservative	Crispin Blunt	21,123	43.8	−13.7
Labour	Andrew Howard	13,382	27.8	+10.3
Liberal Democrats	Peter Samuel	9,615	20.0	−4.1
Referendum	George Gardiner	3,352	7.0	New
Independent	Richard Higgs	412	0.9	New
UKIP	Stephen Smith	290	0.6	New
Majority		7,741	16.0	−15.3
Turnout		48,174	74.4	−4.1
Registered electors				
Conservative hold		Swing	−12.0	

This constituency underwent boundary changes between the 1992 and 1997 general elections and thus change in share of vote is based on a notional calculation. George Gardiner changed party from the Conservative Party to the Referendum Party following his deselection by the local Conservative association.

General election 1992: Reigate
Party	Candidate	Votes	%	±%
Conservative	George Gardiner	32,220	57.1	−2.2
Liberal Democrats	B Newsome	14,556	25.8	+1.4
Labour	H Young	9,150	16.2	+1.9
SDP	M. Bilcliff	513	0.9	New
Majority		17,664	31.3	−3.6
Turnout		56,449	78.5	+6.0
Registered electors				
Conservative hold		Swing	−1.8	

=== Elections in the 1980s ===
General election 1987: Reigate
Party	Candidate	Votes	%	±%
Conservative	George Gardiner	30,925	59.3	+0.3
SDP	Elizabeth Pamplin	12,752	24.4	−2.5
Labour	Robin Spencer	7,460	14.3	+2.2
Green	Graham Brand	1,026	2.0	0.0
Majority		18,173	34.9	+2.8
Turnout		52,163	72.5	−0.4
Registered electors				
Conservative hold		Swing	+1.4	

General election 1983: Reigate
Party	Candidate	Votes	%	±%
Conservative	George Gardiner	29,932	59.0	
SDP	Elizabeth Pamplin	13,625	26.9	
Labour	Bryan A. Symons	6,114	12.1	
Ecology	David R. Newell	1,029	2.0	New
Majority		16,307	32.1	−5.6
Turnout		50,700	72.1	
Registered electors				
Conservative hold		Swing		

=== Elections in the 1970s ===
General election 1979: Reigate
Party	Candidate	Votes	%	±%
Conservative	George Gardiner	33,767	59.79	
Labour	N. Grant	12,454	22.05	
Liberal	J. Speyer	10,257	18.16	
Majority		21,313	37.74	
Turnout		56,478	78.20	
Registered electors				
Conservative hold		Swing		

General election October 1974: Reigate
Party	Candidate	Votes	%	±%
Conservative	George Gardiner	27,769	50.70	
Labour	MG Ormerod	14,185	25.90	
Liberal	AC Bryan	12,554	22.92	
People Power	Mervyn Taggart	266	0.49	New
Majority		13,584	24.80	
Turnout		54,774	75.30	
Registered electors				
Conservative hold		Swing		

General election February 1974: Reigate
Party	Candidate	Votes	%	±%
Conservative	George Gardiner	30,131	50.22	
Liberal	AC Bryan	16,071	26.78	
Labour	MG Ormerod	13,547	22.58	
Independent Democrat	Mervyn Taggart	254	0.42	New
Majority		14,060	23.44	
Turnout		60,003	83.34	
Registered electors				
Conservative hold		Swing		

General election 1970: Reigate
Party	Candidate	Votes	%	±%
Conservative	Geoffrey Howe	28,462	53.86	
Labour	Michael P Farley	15,433	29.20	
Liberal	Kenneth Vaus	8,952	16.94	
Majority		13,029	24.66	
Turnout		52,847	73.88	
Registered electors				
Conservative hold		Swing		

=== Elections in the 1960s ===
General election 1966: Reigate
Party	Candidate	Votes	%	±%
Conservative	John Vaughan-Morgan	24,163	47.37	
Labour	John Edward Anthony Samuels	16,649	32.64	
Liberal	Anthony A Stowell	10,197	19.99	
Majority		7,514	14.73	
Turnout		51,009	80.09	
Registered electors				
Conservative hold		Swing		

General election 1964: Reigate
Party	Candidate	Votes	%	±%
Conservative	John Vaughan-Morgan	24,380	48.35	
Labour	Charles Garnsworthy	14,991	29.73	
Liberal	Anthony A Stowell	11,058	21.93	
Majority		9,389	18.62	
Turnout		50,429	79.74	
Registered electors				
Conservative hold		Swing		

=== Elections in the 1950s ===
General election 1959: Reigate
Party	Candidate	Votes	%	±%
Conservative	John Vaughan-Morgan	26,966	54.34	
Labour	Charles Garnsworthy	14,465	29.14	
Liberal	Agnes H Scott	8,205	16.53	New
Majority		12,501	25.20	
Turnout		49,636	82.36	
Registered electors				
Conservative hold		Swing		

General election 1955: Reigate
Party	Candidate	Votes	%	±%
Conservative	John Vaughan-Morgan	27,210	61.68	
Labour Co-op	Charles Garnsworthy	16,903	38.32	
Majority		10,307	23.36	
Turnout		44,113	78.75	
Registered electors				
Conservative hold		Swing		

General election 1951: Reigate
Party	Candidate	Votes	%	±%
Conservative	John Vaughan-Morgan	24,137	55.92	
Labour Co-op	Charles Garnsworthy	14,287	33.10	
Liberal	Allan Stanley Batham	4,740	10.98	
Majority		9,850	22.82	
Turnout		43,164	83.34	
Registered electors				
Conservative hold		Swing		

General election 1950: Reigate
Party	Candidate	Votes	%
Conservative	John Vaughan-Morgan	23,027	53.66
Labour Co-op	Charles Garnsworthy	13,931	32.46
Liberal	Allan Batham	5,953	13.87
Majority		9,096	21.20
Turnout		42,911	85.12
Registered electors			
Conservative win (new boundaries)			

== Election results 1918–1950 ==
=== Election in the 1940s ===
General election 1945: Reigate
Party	Candidate	Votes	%	±%
Conservative	Gordon Touche	27,419	57.07	
Labour	Charles Garnsworthy	20,623	42.93	
Majority		6,796	14.14	
Turnout		48,042	72.92	
Registered electors				
Conservative hold		Swing		

=== Elections in the 1930s ===
General election 1935: Reigate
Party	Candidate	Votes	%	±%
Conservative	Gordon Touche	30,341	73.84	
Labour	Leonard Lewis	10,748	26.16	
Majority		19,593	47.68	
Turnout		41,089	69.90	
Conservative hold		Swing		

General election 1931: Reigate
Party	Candidate	Votes	%	±%
Conservative	Gordon Touche	33,934	82.75	
Labour	Percy Collick	7,076	17.25	
Majority		26,858	65.50	
Turnout		41,010	75.14	
Conservative hold		Swing		

=== Elections in the 1920s ===
General election 1929: Reigate
Party	Candidate	Votes	%	±%
Unionist	George K. Cockerill	20,851	54.3	−22.3
Liberal	Harold James Hamblen	9,532	24.8	New
Labour	Percy Collick	8,012	20.9	−2.5
Majority		11,319	29.5	−23.7
Turnout		38,395	74.8	+0.8
Registered electors		51,314		
Unionist hold		Swing	−9.9	

General election 1924: Reigate
Party	Candidate	Votes	%	±%
Unionist	George K. Cockerill	19,877	76.6	N/A
Labour	William Graham	6,061	23.4	New
Majority		13,816	53.2	N/A
Turnout		25,938	74.0	N/A
Registered electors		35,070		
Unionist hold		Swing	N/A	

General election 1923: Reigate
Party	Candidate	Votes	%	±%
Unionist	George K. Cockerill	Unopposed		
Unionist hold				

General election 1922: Reigate
Party	Candidate	Votes	%	±%
Unionist	George K. Cockerill	Unopposed		
Unionist hold				

=== Elections in the 1910s ===
Cockerill

General election 1918: Reigate
Party		Candidate	Votes	%	±%
C	Unionist	George K. Cockerill	Unopposed		
	Unionist hold				
C indicates candidate endorsed by the coalition government.

== Election results 1885–1918 ==
=== Elections in the 1880s ===
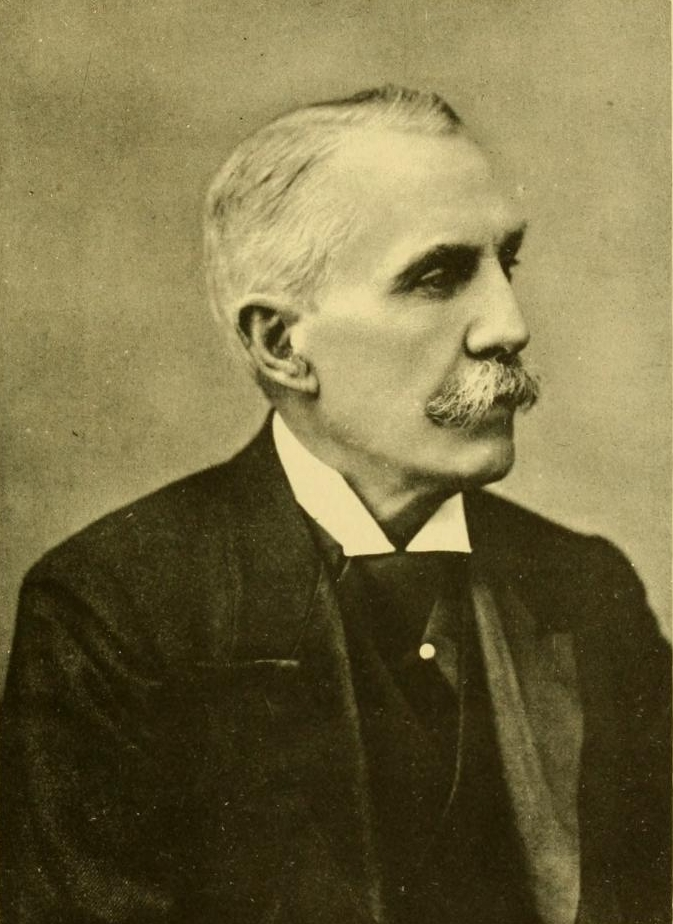
Lawrence

General election 1885: Reigate
Party	Candidate	Votes	%	±%
Conservative	Trevor Lawrence	4,726	63.1	
Liberal	Alfred Carpenter	2,762	36.9	
Majority		1,964	26.2	
Turnout		7,488	78.8	
Registered electors		9,500		
Conservative win (new seat)				

General election 1886: Reigate
Party	Candidate	Votes	%	±%
Conservative	Trevor Lawrence	Unopposed		
Conservative hold				

=== Elections in the 1890s ===
Cubitt

General election 1892: Reigate
Party	Candidate	Votes	%	±%
Conservative	Henry Cubitt	4,786	60.7	N/A
Liberal	Francis Edward Barnes	3,097	39.3	New
Majority		1,689	21.4	N/A
Turnout		7,883	71.1	N/A
Registered electors		11,081		
Conservative hold		Swing	N/A	

General election 1895: Reigate
Party	Candidate	Votes	%	±%
Conservative	Henry Cubitt	Unopposed		
Conservative hold				

=== Elections in the 1900s ===
General election 1900: Reigate
Party	Candidate	Votes	%	±%
Conservative	Henry Cubitt	Unopposed		
Conservative hold				

Brodie

General election 1906: Reigate
Party	Candidate	Votes	%	±%
Liberal	Harry Cunningham Brodie	6,067	50.9	New
Conservative	Richard Hamilton Rawson	5,848	49.1	N/A
Majority		219	1.8	N/A
Turnout		11,915	86.2	N/A
Registered electors		13,817		
Liberal gain from Conservative		Swing	N/A	

=== Elections in the 1910s ===
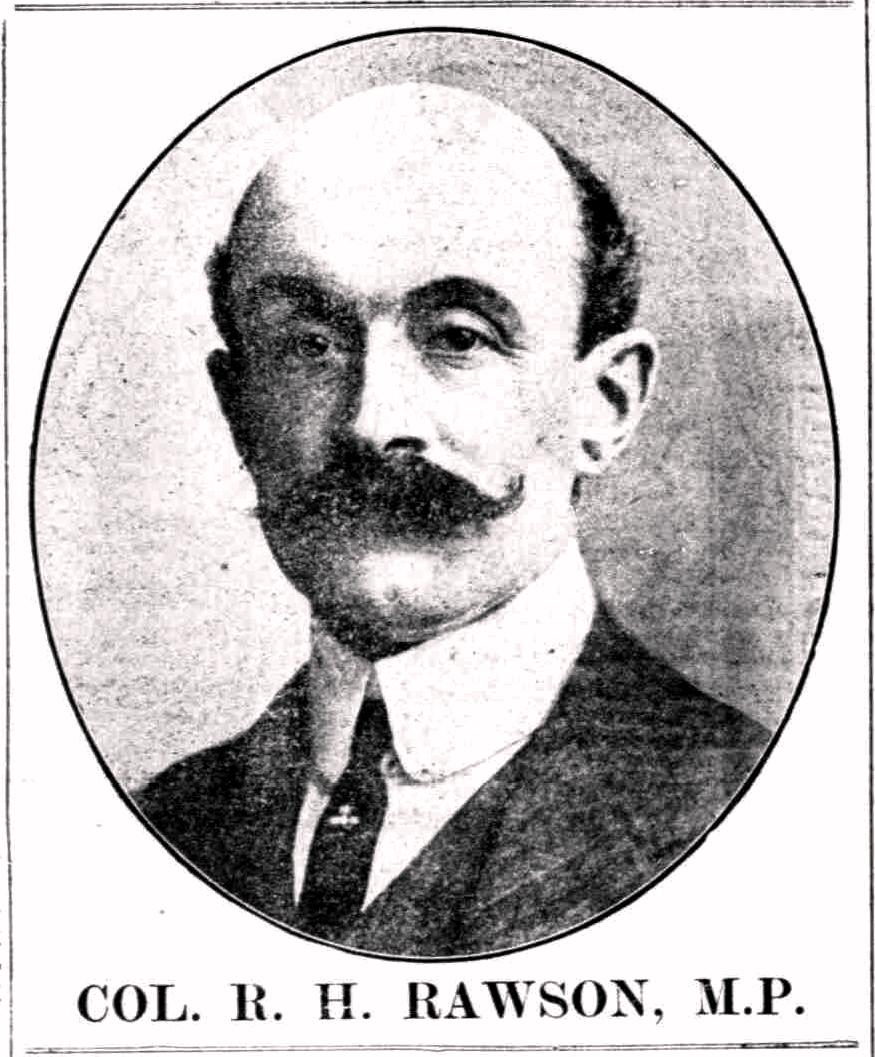
Rawson

General election January 1910: Reigate
Party	Candidate	Votes	%	±%
Conservative	Richard Hamilton Rawson	8,339	59.3	+10.2
Liberal	Harry Cunningham Brodie	5,715	40.7	−10.2
Majority		2,624	18.6	N/A
Turnout		14,054	89.9	+3.7
Registered electors		15,636		
Conservative gain from Liberal		Swing	+10.2	

Goldberg

General election December 1910: Reigate
Party	Candidate	Votes	%	±%
Conservative	Richard Hamilton Rawson	7,710	59.7	+0.4
Liberal	Herbert Walter Goldberg	5,194	40.3	−0.4
Majority		2,516	19.4	+0.8
Turnout		10,226	82.5	−7.4
Registered electors		15,636		
Conservative hold		Swing	+0.4	

General Election 1914–15:

Another General Election was required to take place before the end of 1915. The political parties had been making preparations for an election to take place and by July 1914, the following candidates had been selected;

- Unionist: Richard Hamilton Rawson
- Liberal:

== Election results 1832–1868 ==
=== Elections in the 1830s ===
General election 1832: Reigate
Party	Candidate	Votes	%
Tory	John Somers-Cocks	101	100.0
Whig	George Canning	0	0.0
Majority		101	100.0
Turnout		101	66.4
Registered electors		152	
Tory hold			

General election 1835: Reigate
Party	Candidate	Votes	%	±%
Conservative	John Somers-Cocks	85	85.9	−14.1
Radical	John Moore	14	14.1	N/A
Majority		71	71.8	−28.2
Turnout		99	60.0	−6.4
Registered electors		165		
Conservative hold		Swing	−14.1	

General election 1837: Reigate
Party	Candidate	Votes	%
Conservative	John Somers-Cocks	Unopposed	
Registered electors		205	
Conservative hold			

=== Elections in the 1840s ===
Somers-Cocks succeeded to the peerage, becoming 2nd Earl Somers and causing a by-election.

By-election, 3 February 1841: Reigate
Party	Candidate	Votes	%	±%
Conservative	Charles Somers-Cocks	Unopposed		
Registered electors		197		
Conservative hold				

General election 1841: Reigate
Party	Candidate	Votes	%	±%
Conservative	Charles Somers-Cocks	106	92.2	N/A
Chartist	James Bedford	9	7.8	New
Majority		97	84.4	N/A
Turnout		115	57.8	N/A
Registered electors		199		
Conservative hold		Swing	N/A	

General election 1847: Reigate
Party	Candidate	Votes	%	±%
Conservative	Thomas Somers-Cocks	Unopposed		
Registered electors		182		
Conservative hold				

=== Elections in the 1850s ===
General election 1852: Reigate
Party	Candidate	Votes	%	±%
Conservative	Thomas Somers-Cocks	100	56.8	N/A
Whig	Hillebrant Meredith Parratt	76	43.2	New
Majority		24	13.6	N/A
Turnout		176	77.2	N/A
Registered electors		228		
Conservative hold		Swing	N/A	

General election 1857: Reigate
Party	Candidate	Votes	%	±%
Independent Whig	William Hackblock	228	64.2	New
Conservative	Henry Rawlinson	127	35.8	−21.0
Majority		101	28.4	N/A
Turnout		355	80.3	+3.1
Registered electors		442		
Independent Whig gain from Conservative				

Hackblock's death caused a by-election.

By-election, 6 February 1858: Reigate
Party	Candidate	Votes	%	±%
Conservative	Henry Rawlinson	212	50.1	+14.3
Radical	Frederick Doulton	116	27.4	New
Whig	William Monson	95	22.5	New
Majority		96	22.7	N/A
Turnout		423	95.7	+15.4
Registered electors		442		
Conservative gain from Independent Whig				

Rawlinson was appointed a member of the Council of India, requiring a by-election

By-election, 23 October 1858: Reigate
Party	Candidate	Votes	%	±%
Whig	William Monson	225	51.7	N/A
Radical	William Arthur Wilkinson	210	48.3	N/A
Majority		15	3.4	N/A
Turnout		435	98.4	+18.1
Registered electors		442		
Whig gain from Conservative		Swing		

General election 1859: Reigate
Party	Candidate	Votes	%	±%
Liberal	William Monson	260	61.8	N/A
Liberal	William Arthur Wilkinson	161	38.2	N/A
Majority		99	23.6	N/A
Turnout		421	76.8	−3.5
Registered electors		548		
Liberal hold		Swing	N/A	

=== Elections in the 1860s ===
Monson succeeded to the peerage, becoming Lord Monson and causing a by-election.

By-election, 6 February 1863: Reigate
Party	Candidate	Votes	%	±%
Liberal	Granville William Gresham Leveson-Gower	346	51.0	N/A
Liberal	William Arthur Wilkinson	333	49.0	+10.8
Majority		13	2.0	−21.6
Turnout		679	92.1	+15.3
Registered electors		737		
Liberal hold		Swing	N/A	

General election 1865: Reigate
Party	Candidate	Votes	%	±%
Liberal	Granville William Gresham Leveson-Gower	473	62.2	N/A
Liberal	Edmund Monson	276	36.3	N/A
Conservative	George Gibson Richardson	11	1.4	New
Majority		197	25.9	+2.3
Turnout		760	82.6	+5.8
Registered electors		920		
Liberal hold		Swing	N/A	

== Pre–1832 election results ==
=== Elections in the 1830s ===
General election 1830: Reigate
Party	Candidate	Votes	%
Tory	Joseph Sydney Yorke	Unopposed	
Tory	James Cocks (1773–1854)	Unopposed	
Tory hold			
Tory hold			

General election 1831: Reigate
Party	Candidate	Votes	%
Tory	Joseph Sydney Yorke	Unopposed	
Tory	Joseph Yorke	Unopposed	
Registered electors		59	
Tory hold			
Tory hold			

Joseph Sydney Yorke's death caused a by-election.

By-election, 13 July 1831: Reigate
Party	Candidate	Votes	%
Tory	Charles Yorke	Unopposed	
Registered electors		59	
Tory hold			

Charles Yorke resigned in order to contest a by-election at Cambridgeshire, causing a by-election. He was unsuccessful and stood again for Reigate.

By-election, 15 December 1831: Reigate
Party	Candidate	Votes	%
Tory	Charles Yorke	Unopposed	
Registered electors		59	
Tory hold			

== See also ==
- List of parliamentary constituencies in Surrey
- List of parliamentary constituencies in the South East England (region)

== Sources ==
- Craig, F. W. S. (1989) [1977]. British parliamentary election results 1832–1885 (2nd ed.). Chichester: Parliamentary Research Services. p. 252. ISBN 0-900178-26-4.
- Craig, F. W. S. (1989) [1974]. British parliamentary election results 1885–1918 (2nd ed.). Chichester: Parliamentary Research Services. p. 400. ISBN 0-900178-27-2.
- Craig, F. W. S. (1983) [1969]. British parliamentary election results 1918–1949 (3rd ed.). Chichester: Parliamentary Research Services. p. 479. ISBN 0-900178-06-X.
- Election 2010 - Reigate BBC News
- Reigate Election 2005 - Reigate BBC News
- Vote 2001 – Reigate BBC News
- Election results, 1997 – 2001 Election Demon
- Election results, 1983 – 1992 Election Demon
