= William Monson, 1st Viscount Monson =

William Monson, 1st Viscount Monson (died c. 1672) was one of the Regicides of King Charles I of England.

Monson was knighted in 1623 and created Viscount Monson of Castlemaine (Irish peerage) in 1628. He was elected M.P. for Reigate in 1640, 1645 and 1648. He was nominated as one of the king's judges, but only attended three sittings. After the Restoration of the monarchy in 1660, he was sentenced by Parliament to degradation from his honours and titles and to be imprisoned for life. He died in the Fleet Prison in around 1672.

== Biography ==
William Monson was the son of Admiral William Monson and Dorothy Smith, daughter of Richard Wallop of Bugbrooke, Northamptonshire. He was promoted unsuccessfully as a court favourite in 1618 by the Earl of Suffolk, but was knighted on 12 February 1623, and was raised to the peerage of Ireland as Baron Monson of Ballingard, County Limerick and Viscount Monson, of Castlemaine, County Kerry, by letters patent dated 23 August 1628 On 13 August 1633 he became a member of Gray's Inn. By his first marriage he acquired an estate at Reigate, Surrey, but owing to his dissolute habits he was soon in debt. He refused to pay ship-money, and when elected M.P. for Reigate, 21 October 1640, he opposed the court, and subsequently acted as a committee-man for Surrey.His third wife, Elizabeth, is regarded as an early feminist. She is reputed, with the help of her maids, to have tied her husband naked to the bedpost and whipped him because she disagreed with his political views. Despite this, he supported the Parliamentary side.

On being nominated one of King Charles's judges, he attended on 20, 22, and 23 January 1649, but refused to take part in the ultimate proceedings. He was, however, placed by the parliament on the committee appointed to receive and take note of the dissent of any member from the vote of 5 December 1648. On 19 July 1649 he tried to persuade the house into the belief that the sum of £4,500 was owing to him as arrears of the pension due to his late wife the Countess of Nottingham, but he lost his motion by two votes. The Rump Parliament, when restored in May 1659, was obliged, to form a quorum, to send for Monson and Henry Marten from the Fleet prison, where they were both confined for debt.

At the Restoration he was excepted out of the general pardon granted under Act of Oblivion, and upon surrendering himself on 21 June was recommitted to the Fleet. On 1 July 1661, he was brought up to the bar of the House of Commons, and, after being made to confess his crime, was degraded from all his honours and titles and deprived of his property. He was also sentenced to be drawn from the Tower through the city of London to Tyburn, and so back again, with a halter about his neck, and to be imprisoned for life. In petitioning the House of Lords on 25 July to remit what was most ignominious in his sentence, Monson declared that his design in sitting at the king's trial was, if possible, to prevent "that horrid murder". The ignominious part of the sentence was duly carried out each year on the anniversary of the king's sentence (27 January). Monson appears to have died in the Fleet prison about 1672. His estate at Reigate was granted to the James, Duke of York.

== Family ==
Monson married,

- firstly, Margaret (died 1639), daughter of James Stuart, 2nd Earl of Moray, and widow of Charles Howard, 1st Earl of Nottingham (1536–1624);
- secondly, Frances, daughter of Thomas Alston of Polstead, Suffolk, by whom he left a son Alston (died 1674 without issue);
- thirdly, Elizabeth (died 1695), second daughter of Sir George Reresby, of Thrybergh, Yorkshire, widow of Sir Francis Foljambe, 1st Baronet, of Aldwark in the same county, and of Edward, younger son of Sir John Horner of Mells, Somerset. By his last wife (who married, fourthly, Adam, eldest son of Sir Henry Felton of Playford, Suffolk) he had an only daughter, Elizabeth, married, first, to Sir Philip Hungate, of Saxton, Yorkshire; and, secondly, to Lewis Smith of Wotton, Warwickshire. At the intercession of her nephew, Sir John Reresby, Lady Monson was restored to her title of Viscountess Castlemaine.
