= Battersea North by-election =

Battersea North by-election may refer to one of two parliamentary by-elections held for the British House of Commons constituency of Battersea North, in South London:

- 1940 Battersea North by-election
- 1946 Battersea North by-election
