= Battersea North (UK Parliament constituency) =

Parliamentary constituency in the United Kingdom, 1918–1983

- Former borough constituency for the House of Commons
- Boundary of Battersea North in Greater London for the February 1974 general election
- County: County of London, then Greater London

1918–1983
- Seats: One
- Created from: Battersea
- Replaced by: Battersea

Battersea North was a parliamentary constituency in the Metropolitan Borough of Battersea, and then the London Borough of Wandsworth, in South London. It returned one Member of Parliament (MP) to the House of Commons of the Parliament of the United Kingdom, elected by the first-past-the-post voting system.

It was created for the 1918 general election, when the former Battersea constituency was divided in two. It was abolished for the 1983 general election, when it was reunited with most of Battersea South to form the new Battersea constituency.

== Boundaries ==
Map of boundaries 1974–1983

Dates	Local authority	Maps	Wards
1918–1950	Metropolitan Borough of Battersea		Church, Latchmere, Nine Elms, and Park.
1950–1974	Metropolitan Borough of Battersea (before 1965); London Borough of Wandsworth (after 1965)		Church, Latchmere, Newtown, Nine Elms, Park, Queenstown, Vicarage, and Winstanley.
1974–1983	London Borough of Wandsworth		Latchmere, Queenstown, St John's, St Mary's Park, and Shaftesbury.

A map showing the wards of Battersea Metropolitan Borough as they appeared in 1916.

The constituency was created by the Representation of the People Act 1918. When seats were redistributed by the Representation of the People Act 1948 the seat was redefined as consisting of five wards by the addition of the Winstanley ward, transferred from Battersea South. However the wards of the borough were redrawn in 1949 prior to the next general election in 1950. Accordingly, changes were made under the House of Commons (Redistribution of Seats) Act 1949. Of the 16 new wards, eight were included in each of the Battersea North and South constituencies.

In 1965 Battersea became part of the London Borough of Wandsworth. This, however made no immediate change to the parliamentary constituencies. It was not until the general election of February 1974 that the constituency boundaries were altered. St John's and Shaftesbury wards were transferred from Battersea South. These boundaries were used until abolition.

The constituency was abolished for the election of 1983, and was subsumed by the new Battersea seat, where it formed 61.5% of the total constituency (with the addition of Balham, Fairfield and Northcote wards from Battersea South).

== Members of Parliament ==
Election	Member	Party	Notes
1918	Richard Morris	Coalition Liberal	
Jan 1922	Richard Morris	National Liberal	
1922	Shapurji Saklatvala	Communist	
1923	Henry Hogbin	Liberal	
1924	Shapurji Saklatvala	Communist	
1929	William Sanders	Labour	
1931	Arthur Marsden	Conservative	
1935	William Sanders	Labour	
1940 by-election	Francis Douglas	Labour	Resigned after being appointed Governor of Malta
1946 by-election	Douglas Jay	Labour	
1983	constituency abolished: see Battersea		

== Elections ==
=== Elections in the 1910s ===
General election 1918: Battersea North
Party		Candidate	Votes	%
C	National Liberal	Richard Morris	11,231	66.6
	Labour	Charlotte Despard	5,634	33.4
Majority			5,597	33.2
Turnout			16,865	43.7
Registered electors			38,552	
	National Liberal win (new seat)			
C indicates candidate endorsed by the coalition government.

=== Elections in the 1920s ===
General election 1922: Battersea North
Party	Candidate	Votes	%	±%
Communist (Labour)	Shapurji Saklatvala	11,311	50.6	+17.2
National Liberal	Henry Hogbin	9,290	41.6	–25.0
Liberal	Vivian Claude Albu	1,756	7.9	New
Majority		2,021	9.4	N/A
Turnout		22,357	56.5	–24.1
Registered electors		39,602		
Communist gain from National Liberal		Swing	+21.1	

Henry Hogbin

General election 1923: Battersea North
Party	Candidate	Votes	%	±%
Liberal	Henry Hogbin	12,527	50.4	+42.5
Communist (Labour)	Shapurji Saklatvala	12,341	49.6	–1.0
Majority		186	0.8	N/A
Turnout		24,868	61.9	+5.4
Registered electors		40,183		
Liberal gain from Communist		Swing	+21.7	

General election 1924: Battersea North
Party	Candidate	Votes	%	±%
Communist	Shapurji Saklatvala	15,096	50.9	+1.3
Constitutionalist (Liberal)	Henry Hogbin	14,554	49.1	–1.3
Majority		542	1.8	N/A
Turnout		29,650	73.1	+11.2
Registered electors		40,586		
Communist gain from Liberal		Swing	+1.3	

General election 1929: Battersea North
Party	Candidate	Votes	%	±%
Labour	William Sanders	13,265	37.7	New
Unionist	Arthur Marsden	10,833	30.8	New
Communist	Shapurji Saklatvala	6,554	18.6	–32.3
Liberal	Thomas Brogan	4,513	12.9	–36.3
Majority		2,432	7.0	N/A
Turnout		35,165	69.7	–3.4
Registered electors		50,460		
Labour gain from Communist		Swing	+35.0	

=== Elections in the 1930s ===
General election 1931: Battersea North
Party	Candidate	Votes	%	±%
Conservative	Arthur Marsden	18,688	55.5	+24.7
Labour	William Sanders	11,985	35.6	–2.2
Communist	Shapurji Saklatvala	3,021	8.9	–9.7
Majority		6,703	19.9	N/A
Turnout		33,694	67.6	–2.1
Registered electors		49,873		
Conservative gain from Labour		Swing	+13.4	

General election 1935: Battersea North
Party	Candidate	Votes	%	±%
Labour	William Sanders	17,596	58.7	+23.1
Conservative	Arthur Marsden	12,393	41.3	–14.1
Majority		5,203	17.4	N/A
Turnout		29,989	63.5	–4.0
Registered electors		47,213		
Labour gain from Conservative		Swing	+18.6	

=== Elections in the 1940s ===
1940 Battersea North by-election
Party	Candidate	Votes	%	±%
Labour	Francis Douglas	9,947	92.6	+34.0
Independent	E.C. Joyce	791	7.4	New
Majority		9,156	85.2	+67.8
Turnout		10,738	25.1	–38.4
Registered electors		47,725		
Labour hold		Swing		

General election 1945: Battersea North
Party	Candidate	Votes	%	±%
Labour	Francis Douglas	14,070	73.9	+15.2
Conservative	John Paget	4,969	26.1	–15.2
Majority		9,101	47.8	+30.5
Turnout		19,039	71.1	+7.6
Registered electors		26,783		
Labour hold		Swing	+15.2	

1946 Battersea North by-election
Party	Candidate	Votes	%	±%
Labour	Douglas Jay	11,329	68.9	–4.9
Conservative	B A Shattock	4,858	29.6	+3.5
Ind. Labour Party	Hugo Dewar	240	1.5	New
Majority		6,471	39.3	–8.5
Turnout		16,427	57.1	–14.0
Registered electors		28,753		
Labour hold		Swing	–4.2	

=== Elections in the 1950s ===
General election 1950: Battersea North
Party	Candidate	Votes	%	±%
Labour	Douglas Jay	24,762	69.8	–4.3
Conservative	Martin Madden	9,084	25.5	–0.6
Liberal	Edward Handscombe	1,090	3.1	New
Communist	John Mahon	655	1.8	New
Majority		15,678	44.1	–3.8
Turnout		35,591	80.7	+9.6
Registered electors		44,101		
Labour win (new boundaries)				

General election 1951: Battersea North
Party	Candidate	Votes	%	±%
Labour	Douglas Jay	25,882	72.3	+2.7
Conservative	Ian Percival	9,905	27.7	+2.2
Majority		16,077	44.6	+0.6
Turnout		35,787	80.5	–0.2
Registered electors		44,478		
Labour hold		Swing	+0.3	

General election 1955: Battersea North
Party	Candidate	Votes	%	±%
Labour	Douglas Jay	20,980	70.7	–1.6
Conservative	Ian Percival	8,058	27.2	–0.5
Independent	Eric Fenner	622	2.1	New
Majority		12,922	43.6	–1.1
Turnout		29,660	69.35	–11.1
Registered electors		42,766		
Labour hold		Swing	–0.5	

General election 1959: Battersea North
Party	Candidate	Votes	%	±%
Labour	Douglas Jay	19,595	67.8	–2.9
Conservative	Robert Taylor	9,289	32.2	+5.0
Majority		6,533	35.7	–7.9
Turnout		28,884	70.6	+1.2
Registered electors		40,937		
Labour hold		Swing	–3.9	

=== Elections in the 1960s ===
General election 1964: Battersea North
Party	Candidate	Votes	%	±%
Labour	Douglas Jay	14,930	63.7	–4.1
Conservative	Robert Taylor	5,847	24.9	–7.2
Liberal	Stephen Jakobi	2,187	9.3	New
Communist	Gladys Easton	471	2.0	New
Majority		9,083	38.8	+3.1
Turnout		23,435	65.7	–4.8
Registered electors		35,659		
Labour hold		Swing	+1.5	

General election 1966: Battersea North
Party	Candidate	Votes	%	±%
Labour	Douglas Jay	15,522	72.1	+8.4
Conservative	C Peter M Davidson	5,350	24.9	–0.1
Communist	Gladys Easton	650	3.0	+1.0
Majority		10,172	47.3	+8.5
Turnout		21,522	63.2	–2.5
Registered electors		34,048		
Labour hold		Swing	+4.3	

=== Elections in the 1970s ===
General election 1970: Battersea North
Party	Candidate	Votes	%	±%
Labour	Douglas Jay	11,621	65.5	–6.6
Conservative	Anthony Bradbury	4,927	27.8	+2.9
Liberal	Hester Smallbone	1,012	5.7	New
Communist	D Welsh	179	1.0	–2.0
Majority		6,694	37.7	–9.5
Turnout		17,739	58.9	–4.5
Registered electors		30,226		
Labour hold		Swing	–4.8	

1970 notional result
Party	Vote	%
Labour	17,800	63.1
Conservative	8,500	30.1
Liberal	1,600	5.7
Others	300	1.1
Turnout	28,200	60.2
Electorate	46,837	

General election February 1974: Battersea North
Party	Candidate	Votes	%	±%
Labour	Douglas Jay	18,503	58.8	–4.3
Conservative	Simon Randall	8,080	25.7	–4.5
Liberal	John Savile	4,683	14.9	+9.2
Communist (ML)	Carol Reakes	208	0.7	–0.4
Majority		10,423	33.1	+0.1
Turnout		31,474	70.7	+10.5
Registered electors		44,502		
Labour hold		Swing	+0.1	

General election October 1974: Battersea North
Party	Candidate	Votes	%	±%
Labour	Douglas Jay	17,161	62.2	+3.4
Conservative	Simon Randall	6,019	21.8	–3.8
Liberal	C R Williams	3,048	11.1	–3.8
National Front	R Friend	1,250	4.5	New
Communist (ML)	Carol Reakes	102	0.4	–0.3
Majority		11,142	40.4	+7.3
Turnout		27,580	61.6	–9.2
Registered electors		44,799		
Labour hold		Swing	+3.6	

General election 1979: Battersea North
Party	Candidate	Votes	%	±%
Labour	Douglas Jay	15,834	56.2	–6.0
Conservative	P Phillips	9,358	33.2	+11.4
Liberal	William Brown	2,021	7.2	–3.9
National Front	Michael Salt	772	2.7	–1.8
Workers (Leninist)	A Lavelle	104	0.4	New
Workers Revolutionary	P Clay	47	0.2	New
Community Party	J Harwell	30	0.1	New
Majority		6,746	23.0	–17.4
Turnout		27,716	66.9	+6.4
Registered electors		41,435		
Labour hold		Swing	–8.7	
