= 1950 Dissolution Honours =

British government recognitions

The 1950 Dissolution Honours List was issued on 27 February to mark the dissolution of the United Kingdom parliament prior to the 1950 general election. The list contained only two names.

The recipients of honours are displayed here as they were styled before their new honour, and arranged by honour, with classes (Knight, Knight Grand Cross, etc.) and then divisions (Military, Civil, etc.) as appropriate.

== Hereditary Peers ==
=== Baron ===
- Sir Francis Campbell Ross Douglas, Member of Parliament for Battersea, 1940–46; Governor and Commander-in-Chiefs Malta, 1946–1949; for political and public services, by the name, style and title of Baron Douglas of Barloch, of Maxfield in the County of Sussex.
- The Rt. Hon. John James Lawson, Member of Parliament for Chester-le-Street, County Durham, 1919–1949; for political and public services, by the name, style and title of Baron Lawson, of Beamish in the County of Durham.
