= 1897 Chertsey by-election =

UK parliamentary by-election

The 1897 Chertsey by-election was a parliamentary by-election held on 19 February 1897 for the British House of Commons constituency of Chertsey. It was caused by the resignation of the constituency's sitting Conservative Member of Parliament Charles Harvey Combe, because of his ill-health. Combe had held the seat since the 1892 by-election.

== Result ==
The seat was held for the Conservatives by Henry Currie Leigh-Bennett.

Chertsey by-election, 1897: Chertsey
Party	Candidate	Votes	%	±%
Conservative	Henry Currie Leigh-Bennett	4,845	54.9	N/A
Liberal	Lawrence James Baker	3,977	45.1	New
Majority		888	9.8	N/A
Turnout		8,822	75.5	N/A
Conservative hold		Swing	N/A	
