= Lawrence James Baker =

Lawrence James Baker MP
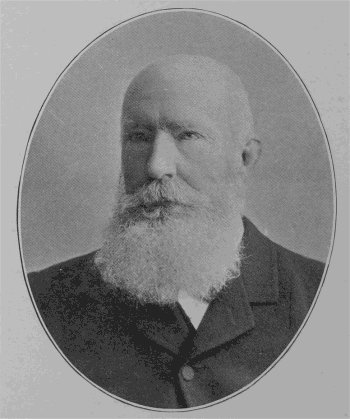
- Baker in 1906

Member of Parliament for Frome
- In office 1885–1886
- Preceded by: Henry Bernhard Samuelson
- Succeeded by: Viscount Weymouth

Personal details
- Born: 4 January 1827
- Died: 10 June 1921 (aged 94)
- Party: Liberal Party

Lawrence James Baker (4 January 1827 – 10 June 1921) was an English stockbroker and a Liberal politician who sat in the House of Commons from 1885 to 1886.

== Early life ==
Baker was born in London, a son of Capt John Law Baker of the Madras Army, and his wife Caroline Elizabeth Browne. Privately educated he became a stockjobber. By 1855 he was senior partner of Baker & Sturdy of Copthall House, EC., and by appointment to Queen Victoria. He was made a trustee of the London Stock Exchange. Expert in foreign bond dealings, he sat on the Peruvian Bondholder's Committee with Liberal colleague, and former cabinet minister, George Shaw-Lefevre. The City of London was responsible for the funds of several Latin American emerging economies; their decisions saved several governments from anarchy and bankruptcy. Baker was a generous benefactor: a donor to charity, a supporter of early free Council houses, and a free trade national liberal, cutting taxes for the poor, free education, disestablishment of the Church of England, and reform of the House of Lords.

Baker was living at Haydon Hall in Eastcote but bought Ottershaw Park in 1885.

== Political career ==
Baker was a candidate at least twice at Guildford and Worcester, before being chosen for Frome at short notice in September 1885, on the retirement through illness of Sir Henry Samuelson. In the 1885 general election, Baker was elected Member of Parliament for Frome. In the Liberal Unionist furore with Joseph Chamberlain's group, he lost his selection for Frome, replaced by G B Samuelson, a local candidate. But the son, G B Samuelson lost the seat in the 1886 general election to the Conservative Party candidate Lord Weymouth. He later stood for parliament unsuccessfully in Chertsey. At by-elections in 1892 he lost to Charles Harvey Combe. When Combe resigned, Baker stood again in 1897. This time Henry Currie Leigh-Bennett was victorious. In 1898 he became High Sheriff of Surrey. He built cottages in Bonsey's Lane at Ottershaw but sold the estate in 1910, after he had put it up for auction unsuccessfully in 1907. He moved for three years to Brantridge Park, Balcome, West Sussex. In 1910 he settled at Brambridge Park, Twyford, Hampshire where he died at the age of ninety-four.

== Personal life ==
Baker married firstly Ellen Catherine Thompson in 1857. His second wife Susan Taylor he married in 1871 at All Saints Church, Kensington, SW. Lawrence had fourteen children, seven by each marriage.

Parliament of the United Kingdom
Preceded by Henry Bernhard Samuelson	Member of Parliament for Frome; 1885 – 1886	Succeeded by Viscount Weymouth
Honorary titles
Preceded by William Keswick	High Sheriff of Surrey; 1898–1899	Succeeded by Sir John Whittaker Ellis, Bt.
