= Alers =

Alers is a surname. Notable people with the surname include:

- David Alers (born 1956), South African cricketer
- Frederick Alers Hankey (1832–1892), English banker and Conservative politician who sat in the House of Commons from 1885 to 1892
- Jim Alers (born 1986), American boxer
- Karmine Alers, singer, former member of 3rd Party
- Luis Alers (1950–2005), Puerto Rican sprinter.
- Rafael Alers (1903–1978), musician, composer, bandleader and the first Puerto Rican to compose the music score for a Hollywood feature film
- Rochelle Alers (born 1963), African-American writer of romance novels
- Yassmin Alers, American stage actor
