= Ifor Bowen Lloyd =

British Judge and Liberal Party politician

His Honour Ifor Bowen Lloyd
- Born: 9 September 1902
- Died: 23 July 1990 (aged 87)
- Occupations: Judge, Politician

His Honour Ifor Bowen Lloyd (9 September 1902 – 23 July 1990), was a British Judge and Liberal Party politician.

== Background ==
Lloyd was elder son of the Rev. Thomas Davies Lloyd, who was the Vicar of Cricklewood and Mrs Margaret Lloyd. He was educated at Winchester and Exeter College, Oxford where he received a BA in Modern History in 1924. While at Oxford he was a member of the Library Committee of the Oxford Union Society. In 1938 he married Naomi Bancroft. They had one son and one daughter. His brother was John Emrys Lloyd.

== Professional career ==
Lloyd was called to Bar by the Inner Temple in 1925. He became a King's Counsel in 1951. He became a County Court Judge. He was appointed a Bencher in 1959, and worked as a Circuit Judge. From 1964 to 1976 he was Judge of Wandsworth County Court.

== Political career ==
Lloyd was Liberal candidate for the Burton division of Staffordshire at the 1929 General Election. He was Liberal candidate for the Chertsey division of Surrey at the 1931 General Election. He did not stand for parliament again.

=== Electoral record ===
General Election 1929: Burton
Party	Candidate	Votes	%	±%
Unionist	Rt Hon. John Gretton	18,243	52.6	
Labour	William Thomas Paling	10,511	30.3	
Liberal	Ifor Bowen Lloyd	5,943	17.1	
Majority			22.3	
Turnout				
Unionist hold		Swing		

General Election 1931: Chertsey
Party	Candidate	Votes	%	±%
Conservative	Sir Archibald Boyd Boyd-Carpenter	35,371	79.6	
Liberal	Ifor Bowen Lloyd	9,063	20.4	
Majority		26,308	59.2	
Turnout			68.7	
Conservative hold		Swing		
