= John Arthur Fyler =

English politician

John Arthur Fyler (1856 – 1929) was an English politician, Conservative Member of Parliament 1903–04 for the English constituency of Chertsey.

== Biography ==
He was the son of the Rev. Frederick Fyler of Ewelme and his wife Charlotte Fane, daughter of John Fane (1775–1850). He was educated at Marlborough College and matriculated at Exeter College, Oxford in 1874, graduating B.A. in 1878.

Fyler was admitted to the Inner Temple in 1875, and called to the Bar there in 1879. Initially, he went the Western circuit. After a time he ceased to practise. He resided from 1887 to 1896 at Burwood Glen, Bournemouth, left to him by his aunt. For some years, Fyler acted as honorary secretary of the Christchurch, Hampshire Conservative Association.

Fyler succeeded to the Woodlands estate, Windlesham, in 1897, after the death of his uncle, the Rev. James Fyler, and that of his mother; and began to live there. He accepted the office of Conservative agent in the Chertsey constituency in 1898.

In March 1903, at a by-election caused by the death of Henry Leigh-Bennett, Fyler, who was regarded as "a keen sportsman and a Freemason," was elected as Unionist M.P. for Chertsey. The defeated Liberal candidate was Hubert Harry Longman.

Fyler was made bankrupt in May 1904, with liabilities of £22,279, and stepped down as MP. The deficiency was partly explained by Stock Exchange losses, £14,000; betting losses, £1,000; interest borrowed money, £3,404; and expenses for his Parliamentary election, £1,043. At the hearing, he said he had visited race tracks since his time at Oxford, and the betting losses might be a higher proportion.

Fyler died at home, Montague Villa, William Street, Bognor Regis, on 17 March 1929. The funeral was on 20 March, at St John's Church; he was buried in the cemetery.

== Personal life ==
Fyler married in 1888 Caroline Norah Hambrough, daughter of Albert John Hambrough (died 1861), of Steephill Castle, Isle of Wight. She died in 1915. In 1916, Fyler married Anstice Drake, daughter of Francis Drake of Bognor Regis.

Parliament of the United Kingdom
| Preceded by Henry Leigh-Bennett | Member of Parliament for Chertsey; 1903–1904 | Succeeded by George Charles Bingham |
