= Chertsey (constituency) =

Parliamentary constituency in the United Kingdom, 1885–1974

- Former county constituency for the House of Commons
- County: Surrey

1885–1974
- Seats: One
- Created from: West Surrey (part); Mid Surrey (small parts)
- Replaced by: Chertsey and Walton; North West Surrey
- During its existence contributed to new seat(s) of: Farnham (Majority, 1918); Esher (Majority, 1950; Woking (Part, 1950))

Chertsey sometimes seen as Surrey North Western, equally the North Western Division of Surrey was created as one of six county constituencies of Surrey for the House of Commons of the UK Parliament. The seat underwent two net reductions and variously included and excluded growing suburban settlements: Egham, Frimley, Weybridge, Walton-on-Thames and Woking.

== History ==
=== Context and contents ===
It was formed by the Redistribution of Seats Act 1885 for the 1885 general election. The 1885 Act in drawing six county divisions for Surrey (of which Chertsey is one) coincided with loss of 16 new parliamentary borough ('PB') seats (mainly the old Lambeth and Southwark seats (subdivided) plus Battersea, Clapham, Camberwell, Peckham, Dulwich, Norwood, Norbury, Croydon, Streatham and Wandsworth). This spelt the loss of all three large, overpopulated and dual-member divisions (namely West, Mid and East). These six non-metropolitan seats covering old Surrey's larger rural-suburban fringe (corners being Richmond, Hindhead, Lingfield and Warlingham); to do so Kingston was created as a seat which took in Richmond to its north and the Guildford seat was radically enlarged into a county division. Creation of the County of London and Croydon County Borough circa 1889 meant that the 16 new PB seats fell into those units administratively.

The seat at first comprised:

- the Sessional Division of Chertsey;
- in that of Guildford so much as lay in the Hundred of Woking but not Stoke-next-Guildford
- the parish of Frimley

The seat was abolished for the February 1974 general election.

=== Political history ===
The seat elected Conservatives for 75 of its 79 years; for the 1906 Parliament and in the standing-record 1906 landslide result of that year it elected Marnham, a Liberal. Tories took most of the votes cast except in the 1960s elections (1964 and 1966) when the candidate, in line with national trends, slid to the narrowest majority seen, 13.6%.

== Boundaries ==
1885–1918: The Sessional Division of Chertsey, the Woking Hundred part of the Sessional Division of Guildford save for Stoke-next-Guildford, and the parish of Frimley. The first listed was chiefly Godley Hundred which contained the modern Borough Runnymede. Woking Hundred resembled the modern boroughs Woking and Surrey Heath.

1918–1950: The Urban Districts of Chertsey, East and West Molesey, Egham, Esher and the Dittons, Walton-upon-Thames, and Weybridge, and the Rural District of Chertsey.

1950–1974: The Urban Districts of Chertsey and Egham, and the Rural District of Bagshot.

The seat lost a broad southern area for an eastern gain in 1918. The seat lost that eastern gain in 1950 but gained Bagshot and surrounding villages.

The first form stretched from Egham in the north via Thorpe, Chertsey, Virginia Water, Longcross, Lyne, Windlesham, Bagshot, Chobham, Addlestone, Weybridge and Byfleet to Woking and Ripley in the south. To the south-west it stretched to Frimley Green and included the inchoate makings of Camberley a town established in the late 20th century. The second form of the seat shed the areas to the south-west, Woking to the south and new urban district containing small former parishes adjoining — instead Hersham and Walton-on-Thames joined the seat from the Epsom division to the east. The final form of the seat became nearly as compact as the early 21st century seat of Runnymede and Weybridge substituting Weybridge with Bagshot, Windlesham, Chobham, West End and Lightwater.

To the north and other directions, forming a large bend, lay the River Thames, at all times in the seat's history.

== Members of Parliament ==
Election	Member	Party	Notes
1885	Frederick Hankey	Conservative	Died February 1892
1892 by-election	Charles Harvey Combe	Conservative	
1897 by-election	Henry Leigh-Bennett	Conservative	Died March 1903
1903 by-election	John Arthur Fyler	Conservative	Declared bankrupt in May 1904
1904 by-election	George Bingham	Conservative	
1906	Francis Marnham	Liberal	
Jan 1910	Donald Macmaster	Conservative	
Constituency split, majority renamed Farnham, minority merged with part of Epsom
1918	Donald Macmaster	Conservative	Died March 1922
1922 by-election	Philip Richardson	Conservative	
1931	Archibald Boyd-Carpenter	Conservative	Member for Coventry (1924–1929), Died May 1937
1937 by-election	Arthur Marsden	Conservative	
Constituency split, majority renamed Esher, minority merged with part of Farnham
1950	Lionel Heald	Conservative	
1970	Michael Grylls	Conservative	Contested North West Surrey following redistribution
Feb 1974	Constituency abolished: see Chertsey and Walton and North West Surrey		

== Elections ==
=== Elections in the 1880s ===
General election 1885: Chertsey
Party	Candidate	Votes	%
Conservative	Frederick Hankey	4,540	63.9
Liberal	Sir Henry Denis Le Marchant, 2nd Baronet	2,560	36.1
Majority		1,980	27.8
Turnout		7,100	77.0
Registered electors		9,220	
Conservative win (new seat)			

General election 1886: Chertsey
Party	Candidate	Votes	%	±%
Conservative	Frederick Hankey	Unopposed		
Conservative hold				

=== Elections in the 1890s ===
Charles Combe

1892 Chertsey by-election
Party	Candidate	Votes	%	±%
Conservative	Charles Combe	4,589	62.5	N/A
Liberal	Lawrence Baker	2,751	37.5	New
Majority		1,838	25.0	N/A
Turnout		7,340	71.7	N/A
Registered electors		10,239		
Conservative hold		Swing	N/A	

General election 1892: Chertsey
Party	Candidate	Votes	%	±%
Conservative	Charles Combe	Unopposed		
Conservative hold				

General election 1895: Chertsey
Party	Candidate	Votes	%	±%
Conservative	Charles Combe	Unopposed		
Conservative hold				

1897 Chertsey by-election
Party	Candidate	Votes	%	±%
Conservative	Henry Leigh-Bennett	4,845	54.9	N/A
Liberal	Lawrence Baker	3,977	45.1	New
Majority		888	9.8	N/A
Turnout		8,822	75.5	N/A
Registered electors		11,678		
Conservative hold		Swing	N/A	

=== Elections in the 1900s ===
General election 1900: Chertsey
Party	Candidate	Votes	%	±%
Conservative	Henry Leigh-Bennett	5,367	63.5	N/A
Liberal	Hubert Longman	3,080	36.5	N/A
Majority		2,287	27.0	N/A
Turnout		8,447	68.7	N/A
Registered electors		12,299		
Conservative hold		Swing	N/A	

1903 Chertsey by-election
Party	Candidate	Votes	%	±%
Conservative	John Arthur Fyler	5,700	55.7	−7.8
Liberal	Hubert Longman	4,529	44.3	+7.8
Majority		1,171	11.4	−15.6
Turnout		10,229	78.9	+10.2
Registered electors		12,964		
Conservative hold		Swing	−7.8	

1904 Chertsey by-election
Party	Candidate	Votes	%	±%
Conservative	Hon. George Bingham	5,425	52.7	−10.8
Liberal	I T Sadler	4,876	47.3	+10.8
Majority		549	5.4	−21.6
Turnout		10,301	74.0	+5.3
Registered electors		15,419		
Conservative hold		Swing	−10.8	

Francis Marnham

General election 1906: Chertsey
Party	Candidate	Votes	%	±%
Liberal	Francis Marnham	6,365	50.4	+13.9
Conservative	Hon. George Bingham	6,266	49.6	−13.9
Majority		99	0.8	N/A
Turnout		12,631	81.9	+13.2
Registered electors		15,419		
Liberal gain from Conservative		Swing	+13.9	

=== Elections in the 1910s ===
General election January 1910: Chertsey
Party	Candidate	Votes	%	±%
Conservative	Donald Macmaster	9,672	65.7	+16.1
Liberal	Francis George Newbolt	5,059	34.3	−16.1
Majority		4,613	31.4	N/A
Turnout		14,731	88.1	+6.2
Registered electors		16,723		
Conservative gain from Liberal		Swing	+16.1	

General election December 1910: Chertsey
Party	Candidate	Votes	%	±%
Conservative	Donald Macmaster	Unopposed		
Conservative hold				

General Election 1914–15:

Another General Election was required to take place before the end of 1915. The political parties had been making preparations for an election to take place and by July 1914, the following candidates had been selected;

- Unionist: Donald Macmaster
- Liberal:

General election 1918: Chertsey
Party		Candidate	Votes	%
C	Unionist	Donald Macmaster	13,531	80.7
	Labour	Thomas Linsey	3,232	19.3
Majority			10,299	61.4
Turnout			16,763	48.0
Registered electors				
	Unionist win (new boundaries)			
C indicates candidate endorsed by the coalition government.

=== Elections in the 1920s ===
1922 Chertsey by-election
Party	Candidate	Votes	%	±%
Unionist	Philip Richardson	11,811	55.4	–25.3
Liberal	Hubert Gough	9,490	45.6	New
Majority		2,321	10.8	−50.6
Turnout		21,301	55.4	+7.4
Unionist hold		Swing		

General election 1922: Chertsey
Party	Candidate	Votes	%	±%
Unionist	Philip Richardson	14,081	60.4	+5.0
Liberal	Henry Samson Clark	9,228	39.6	−6.0
Majority		4,853	20.8	+10.0
Turnout		23,309	58.2	+2.8
Unionist hold		Swing	+5.0	

General election 1923: Chertsey
Party	Candidate	Votes	%	±%
Unionist	Philip Richardson	13,333	55.5	−4.9
Liberal	Reginald John Marnham	10,694	44.5	+4.9
Majority		2,639	11.0	−9.8
Turnout		24,027	60.1	+1.9
Unionist hold		Swing	-4.9	

General election 1924: Chertsey
Party	Candidate	Votes	%	±%
Unionist	Philip Richardson	18,310	71.0	+15.5
Liberal	Walter Crawford Smith	7,471	29.0	−15.5
Majority		10,839	42.0	+31.0
Turnout		25,781	62.7	+2.6
Unionist hold		Swing	+15.5	

General election 1929: Chertsey
Party	Candidate	Votes	%	±%
Unionist	Philip Richardson	21,433	55.6	−15.4
Liberal	Martin Bernard Browne	17,145	44.4	+15.4
Majority		4,288	11.2	−30.8
Turnout		38,578	63.5	+0.8
Unionist hold		Swing	-15.4	

=== Elections in the 1930s ===
General election 1931: Chertsey
Party	Candidate	Votes	%	±%
Conservative	Archibald Boyd-Carpenter	35,371	79.6	+24.0
Liberal	Ifor Bowen Lloyd	9,063	20.4	−24.0
Majority		26,308	59.2	+48.0
Turnout		44,434	68.7	+5.2
Conservative hold		Swing		

General election 1935: Chertsey
Party	Candidate	Votes	%	±%
Conservative	Archibald Boyd-Carpenter	31,484	71.4	−8.2
Liberal	Martin Bernard Browne	12,607	28.6	+8.2
Majority		18,877	42.8	−16.4
Turnout		44,091	60.2	−8.5
Conservative hold		Swing	-8.2	

1937 Chertsey by-election
Party	Candidate	Votes	%	±%
Conservative	Arthur Marsden	19,767	64.8	−6.6
Liberal	Ernest Haylor	10,722	35.2	+6.6
Majority		9,045	29.6	−13.2
Turnout		30,489	39.2	−21.0
Conservative hold		Swing		

- Also described as a Liberal-Progressive

General Election 1939–40: Another General Election was required to take place before the end of 1940. The political parties had been making preparations for an election to take place and by the Autumn of 1939, the following candidates had been selected;

- Conservative: Arthur Marsden
- Liberal:

=== Election in the 1940s ===
General election 1945: Chertsey
Party	Candidate	Votes	%	±%
Conservative	Arthur Marsden	37,456	52.32	
Labour	Brian Barker	25,194	35.19	New
Liberal	William Ridgeway	8,940	12.49	
Majority		12,262	17.13	
Turnout		71,590	69.30	
Registered electors				
Conservative hold		Swing		

=== Elections in the 1950s ===
General election 1950: Chertsey
Party	Candidate	Votes	%
Conservative	Lionel Heald	19,326	51.69
Labour Co-op	Dennis Gordon	14,090	37.69
Liberal	Gerald Edward Owen	3,969	10.62
Majority		5,236	14.00
Turnout		37,385	82.74
Registered electors			
Conservative win (new boundaries)			

General election 1951: Chertsey
Party	Candidate	Votes	%	±%
Conservative	Lionel Heald	20,539	53.56	
Labour Co-op	Dennis Gordon	14,849	38.72	
Liberal	Gerald Edward Owen	2,961	7.72	
Majority		5,690	14.84	
Turnout		38,349	81.06	
Conservative hold		Swing		

General election 1955: Chertsey
Party	Candidate	Votes	%	±%
Conservative	Lionel Heald	23,021	61.10	
Labour	Richard H Edwards	14,656	38.90	
Majority		8,365	22.20	
Turnout		37,677	77.19	
Conservative hold		Swing		

General election 1959: Chertsey
Party	Candidate	Votes	%	±%
Conservative	Lionel Heald	24,836	56.28	
Labour	John Stuart Barr	14,150	32.06	
Liberal	Arthur Russell Mayne	5,146	11.66	
Majority		10,686	24.22	
Turnout		44,132	79.36	
Conservative hold		Swing		

=== Elections in the 1960s ===
General election 1964: Chertsey
Party	Candidate	Votes	%	±%
Conservative	Lionel Heald	22,497	49.06	
Labour	Anthony J Edwards	14,513	31.65	
Liberal	Frederick Michael John Lee	8,844	19.29	
Majority		7,984	17.41	
Turnout		45,854	77.77	
Conservative hold		Swing		

General election 1966: Chertsey
Party	Candidate	Votes	%	±%
Conservative	Lionel Heald	22,584	48.39	
Labour	Anthony J Edwards	16,231	34.78	
Liberal	Frederick Michael John Lee	7,852	16.83	
Majority		6,353	13.61	
Turnout		46,667	77.98	
Conservative hold		Swing		

=== Election in the 1970s ===
General election 1970: Chertsey
Party	Candidate	Votes	%	±%
Conservative	Michael Grylls	27,239	56.59	
Labour	Christopher P Slater	15,653	32.52	
Liberal	R Alfred F Cook	5,239	10.88	
Majority		11,586	25.07	
Turnout		48,131	71.01	
Conservative hold		Swing		
