= 1903 Chertsey by-election =

UK Parliamentary by-election

The 1903 Chertsey by-election was a parliamentary by-election held on 26 March 1903 for the British House of Commons constituency of Chertsey. It was caused by the death of the sitting member Henry Leigh-Bennett, of the Conservative Party. The candidates were John Arthur Fyler (Conservative) and Hubert Longman (Liberal).

The by-election was won by John Arthur Fyler of the Conservative Party.

== Result ==
1903 Chertsey by-election
Party	Candidate	Votes	%	±%
Conservative	John Arthur Fyler	5,700	55.7	−7.8
Liberal	Hubert Longman	4,529	44.3	+7.8
Majority		1,171	11.4	−15.6
Turnout		10,229	78.9	+10.2
Registered electors		12,964		
Conservative hold		Swing	−7.8	
