= Frederick Hankey (politician) =

Frederick Hankey MP

Member of Parliament for Chertsey
- In office 1885–1892
- Preceded by: Constituency established
- Succeeded by: Charles Harvey Combe

Personal details
- Born: Frederick Alers Hankey; 29 March 1833 London, England
- Died: 15 February 1892 (aged 58) Chertsey, Surrey, England
- Party: Conservative
- Education: Oriel College, Oxford

Frederick Alers Hankey (29 March 1833 – 15 February 1892) was an English banker and Conservative politician who sat in the House of Commons from 1885 to 1892. He also played first-class cricket for Marylebone Cricket Club (MCC) in 1852 and 1853.

Hankey was born in London, the son of Thomas Alers Hankey and his wife Elizabeth Green. His father was a banker in the family firm of Hankey & Co.

Hankey was educated at Harrow School and played for the cricket first XI against Eton in 1850 and 1851. He then went to Oriel College, Oxford. He played one game for MCC in 1852 against Surrey Club and in 1853 he played two games for MCC against Oxford University. Hankey played 5 innings in 3 first-class matches, with a top score of 26 not out and an average of 22.00.

Hankey joined his father in the banking business, and in 1868 they were directors of the Consolidated Bank Ltd.

In 1885 Hankey was elected as the Member of Parliament (MP) for Chertsey. In 1887 he acquired the Silverlands estate at Chertsey which was to become the site of St Peter's Hospital

Hankey held his parliamentary seat until his death at Chertsey, Surrey at the age of 58.

Hankey married Mary Wickham Flower, daughter of P. W. Flower of Furzedown, Tooting Common in 1862, but she died the following year. He married again in 1865, to Marian Miller, eldest daughter of Taverner John Miller M.P. Hankey's cousin Reginald Hankey also played first-class cricket for MCC and Surrey.

Parliament of the United Kingdom
New constituency see Mid Surrey	Member of Parliament for Chertsey; 1885 – 1892	Succeeded by Charles Harvey Combe
