= George Bingham, 5th Earl of Lucan =

British soldier and politician (1860–1949)

Brigadier-General The Right Honourable The Earl of Lucan GCVO KBE CB TD PC DL
- Photograph of Lord Lucan, 1943

Member of Parliament for Chertsey
- In office 6 July 1904 – 8 January 1906
- Preceded by: John Arthur Fyler
- Succeeded by: Francis Marnham

Conservative Chief Whip in the House of Lords
- In office 1929–1940
- Preceded by: The Earl of Plymouth
- Succeeded by: The Lord Templemore

Personal details
- Born: 13 December 1860
- Died: 20 April 1949 (aged 88)
- Party: Conservative
- Spouse: Violet S B Spender Clay (m. 1896; died 1949)
- Children: George Bingham, 6th Earl; Lady Barbara Bingham; John Edward Bingham; Lady Margaret Bingham
- Parent: George Bingham, 4th Earl of Lucan (father)
- Education: Harrow School
- Alma mater: Royal Military Academy Sandhurst

Brigadier-General George Charles Bingham, 5th Earl of Lucan, 1st Baron Bingham, GCVO, KBE, CB, TD, PC, DL (13 December 1860 – 20 April 1949), known by the courtesy title of Lord Bingham from 1888 to 1914, was a British soldier and Conservative politician.

== Early life ==
Lucan was the son of George Bingham, 4th Earl of Lucan, and Lady Cecilia Catherine Gordon-Lennox, one of the three daughters of Charles Gordon-Lennox, 5th Duke of Richmond. He was educated at Harrow School and then at the Royal Military College, Sandhurst.

== Career ==
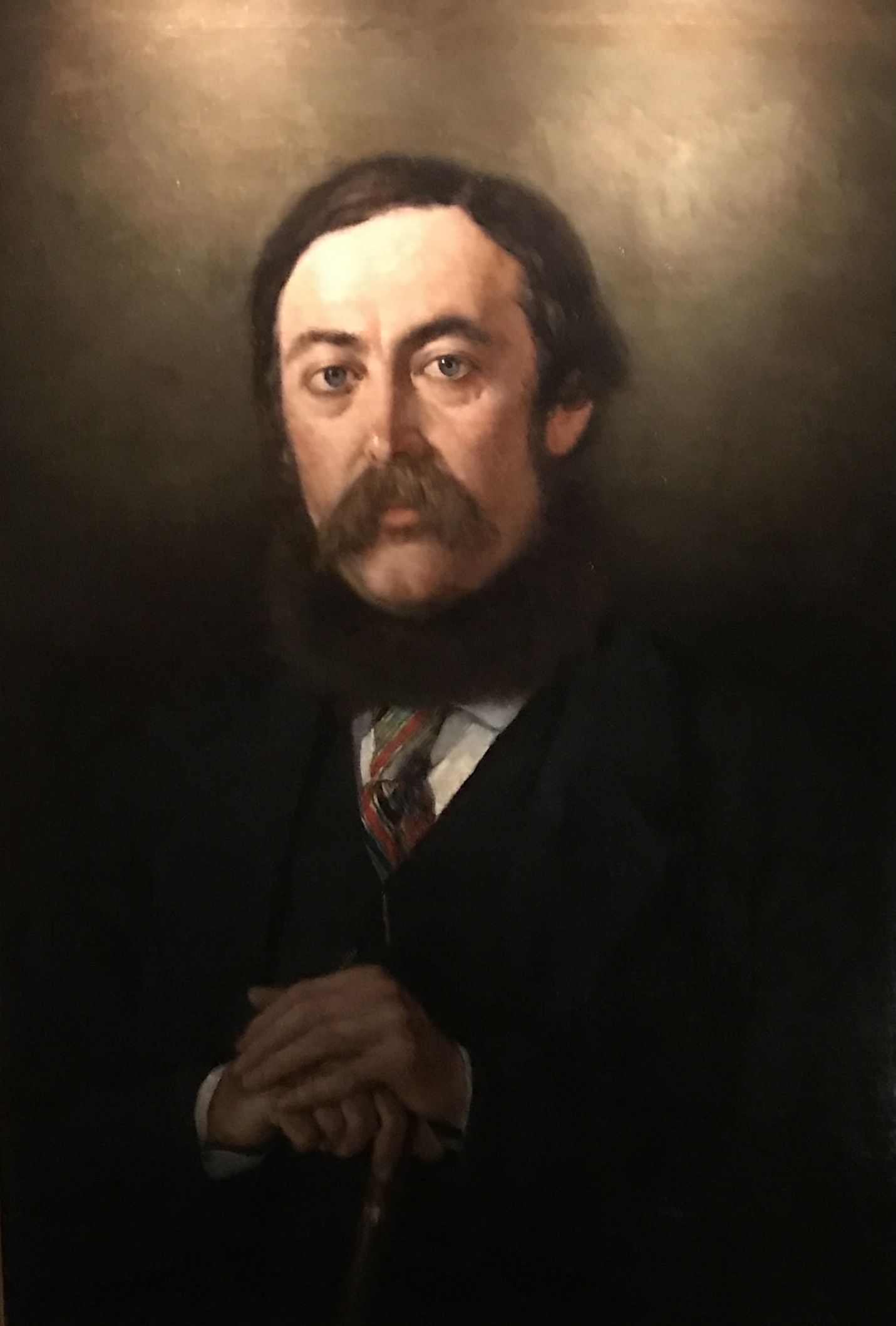
The Earl of Lucan, c. 1896

Lucan's military career began in January 1878 when he was commissioned as a second lieutenant into the Royal Sussex Light Infantry Militia. In January 1881, after graduating from the Royal Military College, Sandhurst, Lucan was commissioned again, now into the Rifle Brigade. He fought in the Bechuanaland Expedition (1884–1885) and was awarded the Order of the Nile 3rd Class. He first retired with the rank of captain in 1896. In 1900 he joined the 1st London Rifle Volunteers (territorial army) as a major, rising to the rank of colonel and commanding officer.

He fought again in the First World War, during which he was mentioned in despatches. He commanded the 2nd London Brigade from 1912–1914 and gained the temporary rank of brigadier general in August 1914 and retired as a lieutenant colonel in 1923.

=== Political career ===
Lucan was for eighteen months a Member of Parliament (MP) for the Chertsey constituency in Surrey. He was the successful Conservative candidate at a by-election on 6 July 1904 and was defeated in the 1906 United Kingdom general election by the Liberal candidate in a landslide for that party. On his father’s death on 5 June 1914 he succeeded him as Earl of Lucan and in August of that year, a few days after Britain had declared war on Germany, he was elected as an Irish representative peer, enabling him to sit in the House of Lords. He served under David Lloyd George, Bonar Law and Stanley Baldwin as a Lord-in-Waiting (a government whip in the House of Lords) from 1920 to 1924 and under Baldwin from 1924 to 1929. In that year, he was appointed as Captain of the Honourable Corps of Gentlemen-at-Arms, a post he held until the government fell later that year. He held it again in the National Government from 1931 to 1940.

Lucan was appointed as High Sheriff of Mayo for 1902–03. He later held for life the family's customary office of Deputy Lieutenant (D.L.) of County Mayo, to which was added the same role for Middlesex; honorary roles which meant deputizing for the Lord-Lieutenant, opening local buildings, and supporting local charities. He also served as a Justice of the Peace in local magistrates courts in Middlesex.

On 26 June 1934, Lucan was created Baron Bingham, of Melcombe Bingham, in the County of Dorset, in the peerage of the United Kingdom, giving him and his lawful heirs the right to sit in the House of Lords. His son, George, sat on the Labour benches after inheriting the peerage in 1949. However, the House of Lords Act 1999 excluded most hereditary peers from the House of Lords.

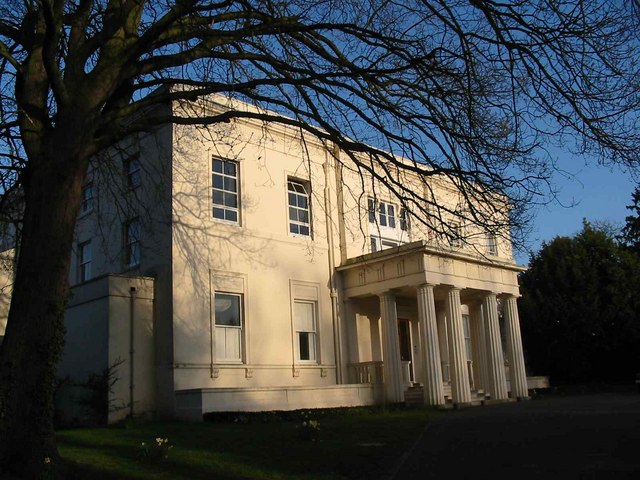
Laleham House sold by Lucan as his home in 1922, later known as Laleham Abbey forms nine apartments by Laleham Park in Laleham.

In 1922 Lucan sold his family's home since 1803 at Laleham House and most of its remaining land; the purchaser of the house was the Roman Catholic Church. He had earlier widened his father's gift of land which gave over Laleham Park for community use.

=== Honours ===
In 1885, Lucan was awarded the Order of the Nile, 3rd Class. During the First World War, he was awarded by Nicholas II of Russia the Order of St. Stanislas of Russia, second class. Lucan was appointed a Companion of the Order of the Bath (C.B.) in 1919 and a Knight Commander of the Order of the British Empire (K.B.E.) in the 1920 civilian war honours list. He was also awarded the Territorial Decoration (T.D.) in 1920. From 1920 until 1928 he was one of the King's aides-de-camp, a ceremonial honour awarded to military figures which entitles the recipient to wear aiguillettes.

Ribbon of Commander (3rd Class) of Order of the Nile neck badge

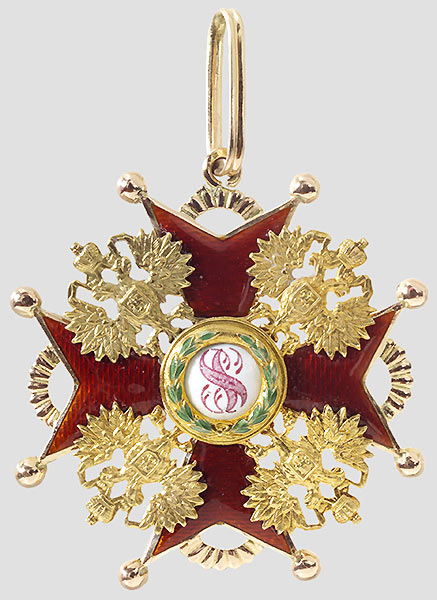
Badge of the Order of St Stanisla(u)s

== Personal life ==
In 1896 Lucan married Violet Sylvia Blanche Spender Clay (c. 1878–1972), a daughter of Joseph Spender Clay and Elizabeth Sydney Garrett, with whom he had four children:

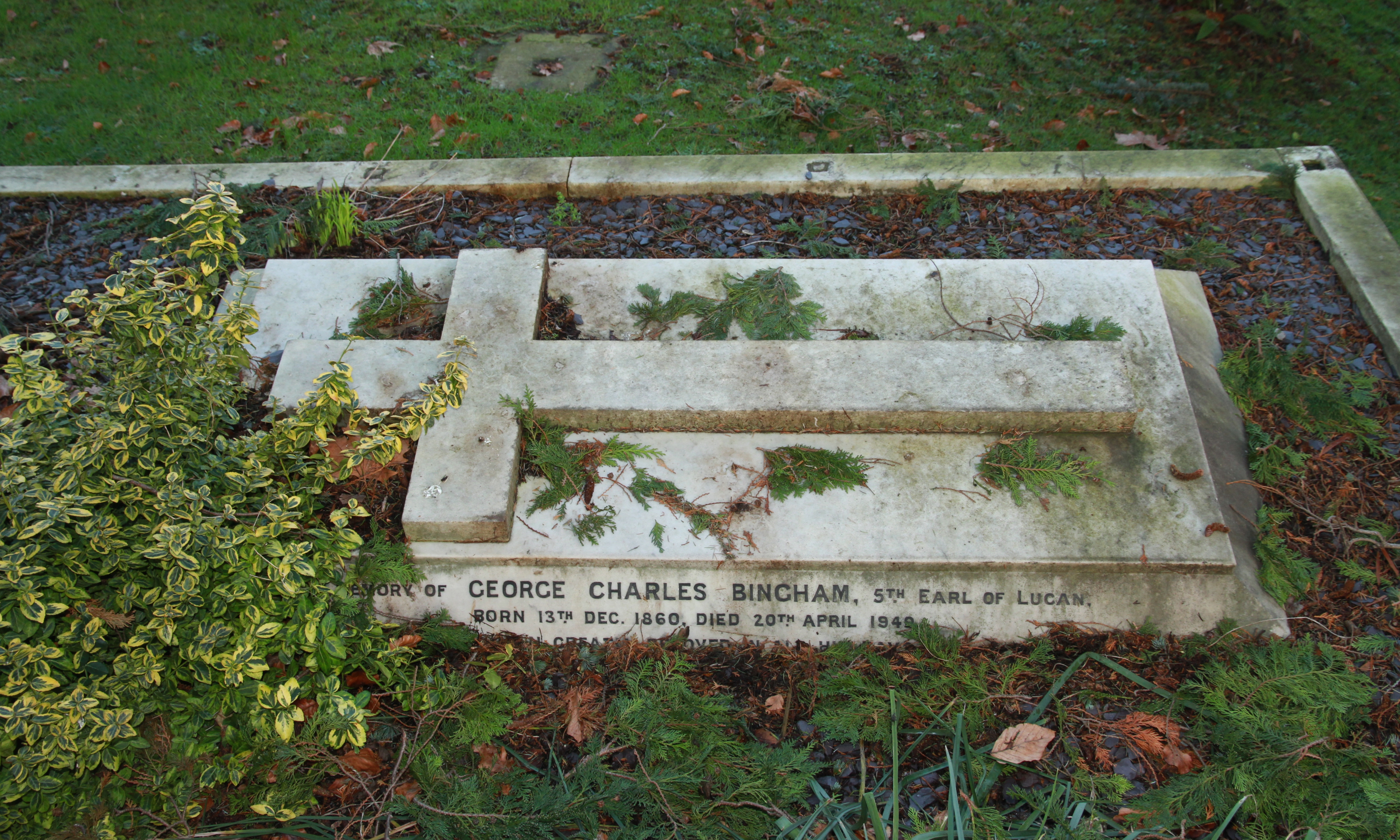
Grave of the 5th Earl of Lucan in All Saints' parish churchyard, Laleham, Middlesex

- George Charles Patrick Bingham, 6th Earl of Lucan (1898–1964)
- Lady Barbara Violet Bingham (1902–1963), who married John Bevan, CB, MC
- Hon. John Edward Bingham (1904–1992)
- Lady Margaret Bingham (1905–1977), who married Field Marshal the 1st Earl Alexander of Tunis, son of James Alexander, 4th Earl of Caledon

Lucan died in 1949 while staying at the Cavendish Hotel, Eastbourne, but by then usually lived in Westminster at 19 Orchard Court, Portman Square. His son swore net assets for probate at £14,464; two months later his son-in-law and James Hamilton, Marquess of Hamilton swore to settled land whose free value was £119,153. Together these figures are equivalent to £4,082,000 in 2025, to be taxed, subject to exemptions. He was succeeded in the earldom by his eldest son George through whom the title continues as at 2025. The Dowager Countess of (Lady) Lucan died after their eldest son in 1972; her net estate at death was sworn as £26,433 that year; she lived at 40 Orchard Court, Portman Square.

=== Descendants ===
Lucan's grandson, Richard John Bingham, 7th Earl of Lucan, who inherited the title in 1964, disappeared in 1974, after allegedly murdering his children's nanny in a failed attempt to kill his estranged wife, Veronica. He was declared legally dead in 2016.

== Ancestry ==
Ancestors of George Bingham, 5th Earl of Lucan

16. Charles Bingham, 1st Earl of Lucan
8. Richard Bingham, 2nd Earl of Lucan
17. Margaret Smith
4. George Bingham, 3rd Earl of Lucan
18. Henry Belasyse, 2nd Earl Fauconberg
9. Lady Elizabeth Belasyse
19. Charlotte Lamb
2. Charles Bingham, 4th Earl of Lucan
20. Hon. Robert Brudenell
10. Robert Brudenell, 6th Earl of Cardigan
21. Anne Bishopp
5. Lady Anne Brudenell
22. George John Cooke
11. Penelope Anne Cooke
23. Penelope Bowyer
1. George Bingham, 5th Earl of Lucan
24. Lord George Lennox
12. Charles Lennox, 4th Duke of Richmond
25. Lady Louisa Kerr
6. Charles Gordon-Lennox, 5th Duke of Richmond
26. Alexander Gordon, 4th Duke of Gordon
13. Lady Charlotte Gordon
27. Jane Maxwell
3. Lady Cecilia Gordon-Lennox
28. Henry Paget, 1st Earl of Uxbridge
14. Henry Paget, 1st Marquess of Anglesey
29. Jane Champagné
7. Lady Caroline Paget
30. George Villiers, 4th Earl of Jersey
15. Lady Caroline Villiers
31. Frances Twysden

Parliament of the United Kingdom
Preceded by John Arthur Fyler	Member of Parliament for Chertsey; 1904–1906	Succeeded by Francis Marnham
Political offices
Preceded by The Earl of Lucan	Representative peer for Ireland; 1914–1949	Office lapsed
Preceded by The Earl of Onslow	Lord-in-waiting; 1920–1929	Succeeded by The Lord Templemore
Preceded by The Earl of Plymouth	Captain of the Honourable Corps of Gentlemen-at-Arms; 1929	Succeeded by The Earl of Cavan
Preceded by The Earl of Plymouth	Government Chief Whip in the House of Lords; 1929	Succeeded by The Earl De La Warr
Preceded by The Earl of Cavan	Captain of the Honourable Corps of Gentlemen-at-Arms; 1931–1940	Succeeded by The Lord Snell
Preceded by The Lord Marley	Government Chief Whip in the House of Lords; 1931–1940	Succeeded by The Lord Templemore
Peerage of Ireland
Preceded by Charles Bingham	Earl of Lucan; 1914–1949	Succeeded by George Bingham
Peerage of the United Kingdom
New creation	Baron Bingham; 1934–1949	Succeeded by George Bingham
