= 1904 Chertsey by-election =

UK parliamentary by-election

The 1904 Chertsey by-election was a parliamentary by-election held on 6 July 1904 for the British House of Commons constituency of Chertsey. It was caused by John Arthur Fyler, who stepped down because of bankruptcy. The candidates were Lord George Bingham (Conservative) and Thomas Sadler (Liberal).

== Campaign ==
Sadler stated that the Government had lost the confidence of the country by the mess and muddle both home and abroad. Sadler considered that the passage of the Education Act violated the great principle of public control of the expenditure of public money. Sadler was supported by the Trades Union Congress, for his promise to support legislation to remedy the Taff Vale decision.

Bingham (Conservative) argued that a change of the Government would be disastrous to the British Empire. Bingham also expressed his agreement with the fiscal policy of the Prime Minister, and said that the Chinese Ordinance was the only possible course towards the solution of the problem of the proper development of the Transvaal. Prime Minister Arthur Balfour agreed on this, and gave his support to Bingham.

== Result ==
In the end, the Conservatives won, although its majority was reduced:

Chertsey by-election, 1904
Party	Candidate	Votes	%	±%
Conservative	George Bingham	5,425	52.7	−3.0
Liberal	Thomas Sadler	4,876	47.3	+3.0
Majority		549	5.4	−6.0
Turnout		10,301	74.0	−4.9
Conservative hold		Swing	-3.0	

== Methods of campaigning ==
Bingham was not too pleased with the methods of campaigning of the Liberal Party. Charles Spencer-Churchill, Under-Secretary for the Colonies, also criticized the campaign in Chertsey. "I must own," he said, "that the election has been characterized by some of the most appalling falsehoods that have ever disgraced a public platform. Nothing to sacred to some kind of people. Even hymns and the prayerbook are not too sacred for their manipulation. If Sir Henry Campbell-Bannerman's party is going to carry out this kind of practice future either it must be sadly out of his control, or else he has lent himself and his party a kind practice which degrading to public and political life."
