= 1922 Chertsey by-election =

UK parliamentary by-election

← 1918	24 March 1922	1922 →

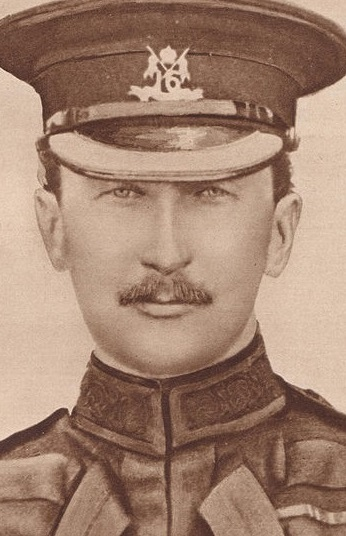
Candidate	Richardson	Gough
Party	Unionist	Liberal
Popular vote	11,811	9,490
Percentage	55.4%	45.6%
MP before election
MacMaster
Unionist
Subsequent MP
Richardson
Unionist

The 1922 Chertsey by-election was a parliamentary by-election for the British House of Commons constituency of Chertsey on 24 March 1922.

== Vacancy ==
The by-election was caused by the death of the sitting Unionist MP, Sir Donald Macmaster on 3 March 1922. He had been MP here since winning the seat in January 1910.

== Election history ==
Chertsey had returned Conservative or Unionist candidates at every election since the constituency was created in 1885, apart from the Liberal landslide of 1906. The result at the last general election was:

1918 general election
Party		Candidate	Votes	%	±%
C	Unionist	Donald Macmaster	13,531	80.7	N/A
	Labour	Thomas T Linsey	3,232	19.3	New
Majority			10,299	61.4	N/A
Turnout			16,763	48.0	N/A
	Unionist hold		Swing	N/A	
C indicates candidate endorsed by the coalition government.

== Candidates ==
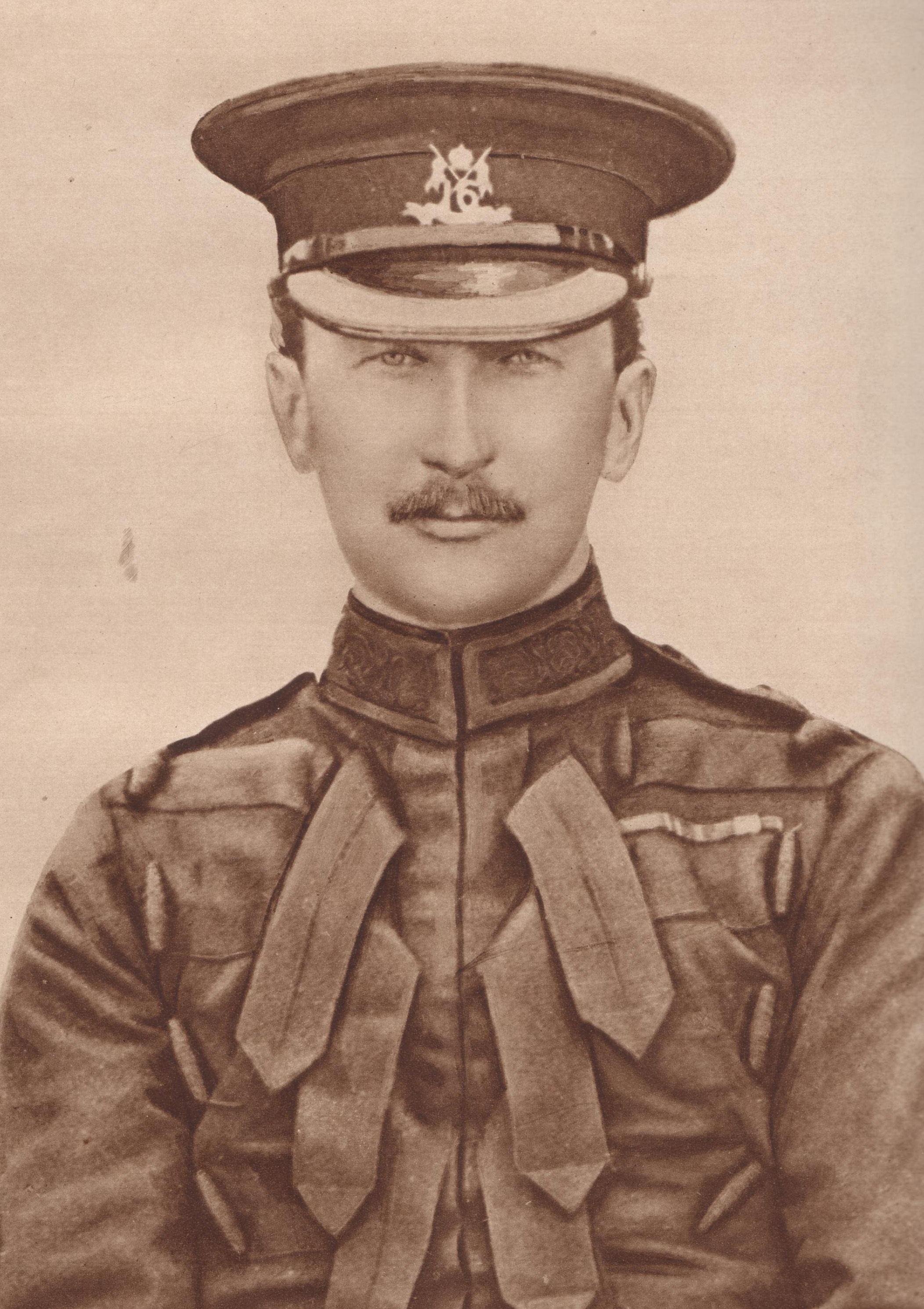
Sir Hubert Gough

- The Unionist's chose first time candidate Philip Richardson, who had won a silver medal at the 1908 London Olympics, for Shooting. He was a Shipbuilder who ran his business from Wallsend.
- The Labour Party, who had run a candidate in 1918 left the field and the Liberal Party, who had not run a candidate in 1918, intervened. The Liberals also chose a first time candidate in Sir Hubert Gough, who had commanded the British Fifth Army during the Great War and had recently retired from the Army.

== Result ==
The Unionists held onto the seat with a greatly reduced majority.

Chertsey by-election, 1922
Party	Candidate	Votes	%	±%
Unionist	Philip Wigham Richardson	11,811	55.4	−25.3
Liberal	Sir Hubert Gough	9,490	45.6	New
Majority		2,321	10.8	−50.6
Turnout		21,301	55.4	+7.4
Unionist hold		Swing		

== Aftermath ==
Philip Richardson continued as the MP until retiring in 1931. Sir Hubert Gough did not stand for election again. The Liberal Party never managed to mount as strong a challenge again as Chertsey remained a safe Conservative seat throughout its history. The result at the following general election;

1922 general election
Party	Candidate	Votes	%	±%
Unionist	Philip Wigham Richardson	14,081	60.4	+5.0
Liberal	Henry Samson Clark	9,228	39.6	−6.0
Majority		4,853	20.8	+10.0
Turnout		23,309	58.2	+2.8
Unionist hold		Swing	+5.0	

== See also ==
- List of United Kingdom by-elections
- United Kingdom by-election records
