= Philip Richardson =

British sport shooter & politician (1865–1953)

Sir Philip Richardson, 1st Baronet OBE
- Richardson in 1923

Member of Parliament for Chertsey
- In office 24 March 1922 – 7 October 1931
- Preceded by: Sir Donald Macmaster
- Succeeded by: Archibald Boyd-Carpenter

Personal details
- Born: 26 January 1865 Newcastle upon Tyne, England
- Died: 23 November 1953 (aged 88) Weybridge, Surrey, England
- Party: Conservative
- Parent: John Wigham Richardson (father)
- Sports career
- Sport: Sports shooting
Medal record
Men's shooting
Representing United Kingdom
Olympic Games
Silver medal – second place	1908 London	Military rifle, team

Sir Philip Wigham Richardson, 1st Baronet, OBE (26 January 1865 – 23 November 1953) was a British sport shooter and Conservative politician. He was the first son of John Wigham Richardson, the shipbuilder from Newcastle upon Tyne. He also competed at the 1908 Summer Olympics and the 1912 Summer Olympics.

== Biography ==
Richardson was born on 26 January 1865 in Newcastle upon Tyne, the eldest son of shipbuilder John Wigham Richardson. He was educated at Rugby School and King's College, Cambridge. He joined the shipbuilding company his father had founded on Tyneside in 1859. He was made a director in 1891 and continued to be a director after the amalgamation of his company with C. S. Swan and Hunter, Ltd., to form the shipbuilding and engineering company of Swan, Hunter and Wigham Richardson. During his association with the company, he travelled extensively in search of orders. He continued to serve as a director after he retired from the company's chairmanship, a position he occupied from 1945 to 1949.

He married Rosa América Colorado from Cuba in 1891, with whom he had three children: John Edward Colorado Richardson (1892), William Wigham Richardson (1893), and George Wigham Richardson (1895). He divorced his first wife in 1897. In 1909, he married Bertha Anne Greenley, with whom he had one daughter, Irene Geraldine Wigham.

Richardson competed in the 1908 Summer Olympics and 1912 Summer Olympics. In the 1908 Olympics he won a silver medal in the team military rifle event. Four years later, he was 65th in the 300 metre military rifle, three positions event and 33rd in the 600 metre free rifle event. Appointed an Officer of the Order of the British Empire (OBE) in 1919, he was knighted in 1921. In 1926 he was elected Vice-Chair of the National Rifle Association.

Richardson was elected as Member of Parliament (MP) for Chertsey at a by-election in March 1922 and held the seat until he retired from the House of Commons at the 1931 general election. On 26 July 1929 he was created a Baronet, of Weybridge in the County of Surrey.

He led a life travelling around the world, especially in Latin America, Africa, India, and Eastern Europe. He drove across the Sahara desert in 1937 and piloted his own light aircraft.

In 1952, he published his autobiography, It happened to me: Being the reminiscences of Sir Philip Wigham Richardson.

He died at his home in Weybridge on the night of 23 November 1953, aged 88.

Parliament of the United Kingdom
Preceded by Sir Donald Macmaster	Member of Parliament for Chertsey; 1922–1931	Succeeded by Archibald Boyd-Carpenter
Baronetage of the United Kingdom
New creation	Baronet (of Weybridge); 1929–1953	Succeeded by William Wigham Richardson
