= 1940 Battersea North by-election =

UK parliamentary by-election

The 1940 Battersea North by-election was a parliamentary by-election held on 17 April 1940 for the British House of Commons constituency of Battersea North in the Metropolitan Borough of Battersea.

The seat had become vacant on the resignation due to ill-health of the constituency's Labour Member of Parliament (MP), William Sanders. He had held the seat since the 1929 general election, with a four-year gap after his defeat in the National landslide at the 1931 general election. He was re-elected at the 1935 election.

== Candidates ==
The Labour Party selected as its candidate Francis Douglas, a former solicitor. In keeping with a war-time electoral pact, the Conservative and Liberal parties did not field candidates, and Douglas's only opponent was E.C. Joyce, who stood as an anti-war Independent candidate. Joyce received the backing of the Communist Party.

== Result ==
On a considerably reduced turnout, Douglas held the seat for Labour with a majority of 9,156 votes; Joyce won just 7.4% of the votes cast, thus forfeiting his deposit.

Douglas would go on to hold the seat against Conservative opposition at the 1945 general election, until resigning in 1946 to take up the post of Governor of Malta, precipitating another by-election in the constituency.

Battersea North by-election, 1940
Party	Candidate	Votes	%	±%
Labour	Francis Douglas	9,947	92.6	+33.9
Independent	E.C. Joyce	791	7.4	New
Majority		9,156	85.2	+67.8
Turnout		10,738	25.1	−38.4
Labour hold		Swing		

== Previous result ==
1935 general election: Battersea North
Party	Candidate	Votes	%	±%
Labour	William Sanders	17,596	58.7	+23.1
Conservative	Arthur Marsden	12,393	41.3	−14.1
Majority		5,203	17.4	N/A
Turnout		29,989	63.5	−4.1
Labour gain from Conservative		Swing	+18.6	

== See also ==
- Battersea North constituency
- 1946 Battersea North by-election
- Battersea
- List of United Kingdom by-elections
- United Kingdom by-election records
