= Lionel Heald =

British politician (1897-1981)

The Right Honourable Sir Lionel Heald PC QC
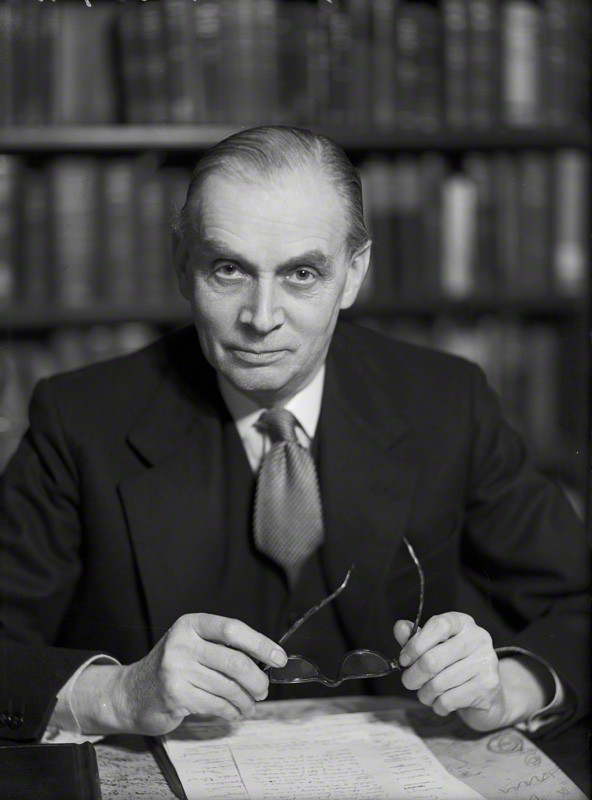
- Heald in 1953

Attorney General for England and Wales
- In office 3 November 1951 – 18 October 1954
- Prime Minister: Winston Churchill
- Preceded by: Sir Frank Soskice
- Succeeded by: Sir Reginald Manningham-Buller, Bt

Member of Parliament for Chertsey
- In office 23 February 1950 – 29 May 1970
- Preceded by: Arthur Marsden
- Succeeded by: Michael Grylls

Personal details
- Born: 7 August 1897 Parrs Wood, Lancashire, England
- Died: 8 November 1981 (aged 84) Chilworth, Surrey, England
- Party: Conservative
- Spouses: Flavia Forbes (m. 1923; div. 1928) Daphne Constance Price (m. 1929)
- Children: Susan Hibbert; Michael Arthur Rufus Heald; Mervyn Heald; Antony Heald; Elizabeth Lane
- Education: Charterhouse School
- Alma mater: Christ Church, Oxford (BA)

Military service
- Allegiance: United Kingdom
- Branch/service: British Army; Royal Air Force
- Rank: Air commodore
- Battles/wars: World War I World War II
- Awards: Bronze Medal of Military Valor

Sir Lionel Frederick Heald, PC QC (7 August 1897 – 8 November 1981) was a British barrister and Conservative Party politician.

== Early life ==
Heald was born in Parrs Wood, Didsbury, Lancashire. He was educated at Charterhouse, then served in France and Italy during World War I in the Royal Engineers, and was awarded the Italian Bronze Medal of Military Valor. After demobilization, he went to Christ Church, Oxford as a Holford exhibitioner, reading literae humaniores and graduating with a BA in 1920.

He was called to the Bar by the Middle Temple in 1923. At the Bar, his pupil masters were Donald Somervell and Stafford Cripps. Heald was junior counsel to the Board of Trade from 1931 to 1937, when he was appointed King's Counsel. He was a St Pancras borough councillor from 1934 until 1937. During World War II he served with the Royal Air Force Volunteer Reserve and reached the rank of air commodore.

== Parliamentary career ==
At the 1950 general election, Heald was elected as member of parliament for the Chertsey constituency in Surrey, having been previously defeated in St Pancras South West in the 1945 general election. He held the seat until his retirement at the 1970 general election.

Heald introduced the Common Informers Act 1951 as a Private Member's Bill.

Heald served as Attorney General in Winston Churchill's government from 1951 to 1954, receiving the customary knighthood upon appointment. He prosecuted John Christie and the poisoner Louisa May Merrifield in 1953. He was made a Privy Counsellor in the 1954 New Years Honours List. After his resignation as Attorney General he returned to the backbenches, and retired from the House of Commons in 1970. He helped Margaret Thatcher introduce the Public Bodies (Admission to Meetings) Act 1960, similar to a bill that he had proposed years earlier, in her maiden speech.

== Family ==
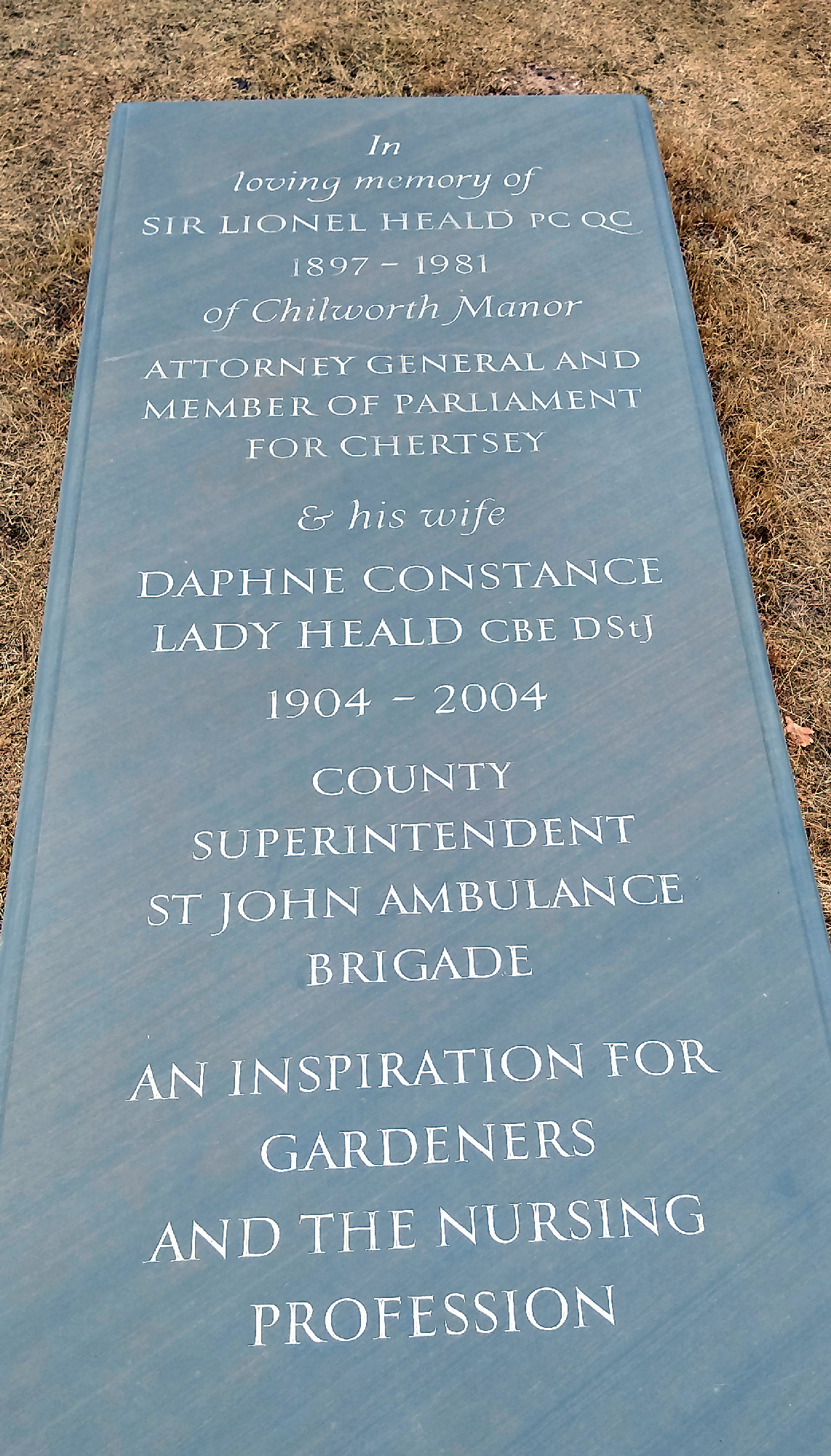
Grave, St Martha-on-the-Hill

Heald married Flavia Forbes, the younger daughter of Lt. Col. James Stewart Forbes and Lady Angela Forbes, on 9 April 1923, and was divorced from her in June 1928, on the grounds of her adultery with Captain James Roy Notter Garton.

On 15 May 1929 he married Daphne Constance Price, daughter of Montagu W. Price, Chairman of the London Stock Exchange and through her mother, a niece of Edith Villiers, Countess of Lytton. They lived at Chilworth Manor, Surrey. Lady Heald trained at the Queen's Nursing Institute prior to her marriage and from 1950 became vice-president of the Royal College of Nursing. She was chairman of the National Gardens Scheme from 1951 to 1979, and opened the gardens at Chilworth for fundraising events for Marie Curie Cancer Care and other medical charities. She was appointed CBE in 1976. Lady Heald died on 14 August 2004, aged 99.

Heald lived at Chilworth Manor, Surrey, where he died on 8 November 1981, aged 84.

Heald's daughter from his first marriage, Susan was one of the secretaries who typed the English versions of the German Instrument of Surrender at the conclusion of the Second World War. His daughter Elizabeth married Colonel George Lane in 1963.

Parliament of the United Kingdom
Preceded by Arthur Marsden	Member of Parliament for Chertsey; 1950–1970	Succeeded by Michael Grylls
Legal offices
Preceded by Frank Soskice	Attorney General for England and Wales; 1951–1954	Succeeded by Sir Reginald Manningham-Buller
