= Albert Meserlin =

Albert B. Meserlin, Jr. (May 26, 1920 – March 29, 2009) was staff photographer to General Dwight D. Eisenhower. With the passing of British Staff Sergeant Susan Hibbert, Meserlin was one of the last surviving witnesses to the German surrender ceremony at the end of World War II, survived by just Eisenhower staff member Noel J. Weiner and Life magazine photographer Ralph Morse.

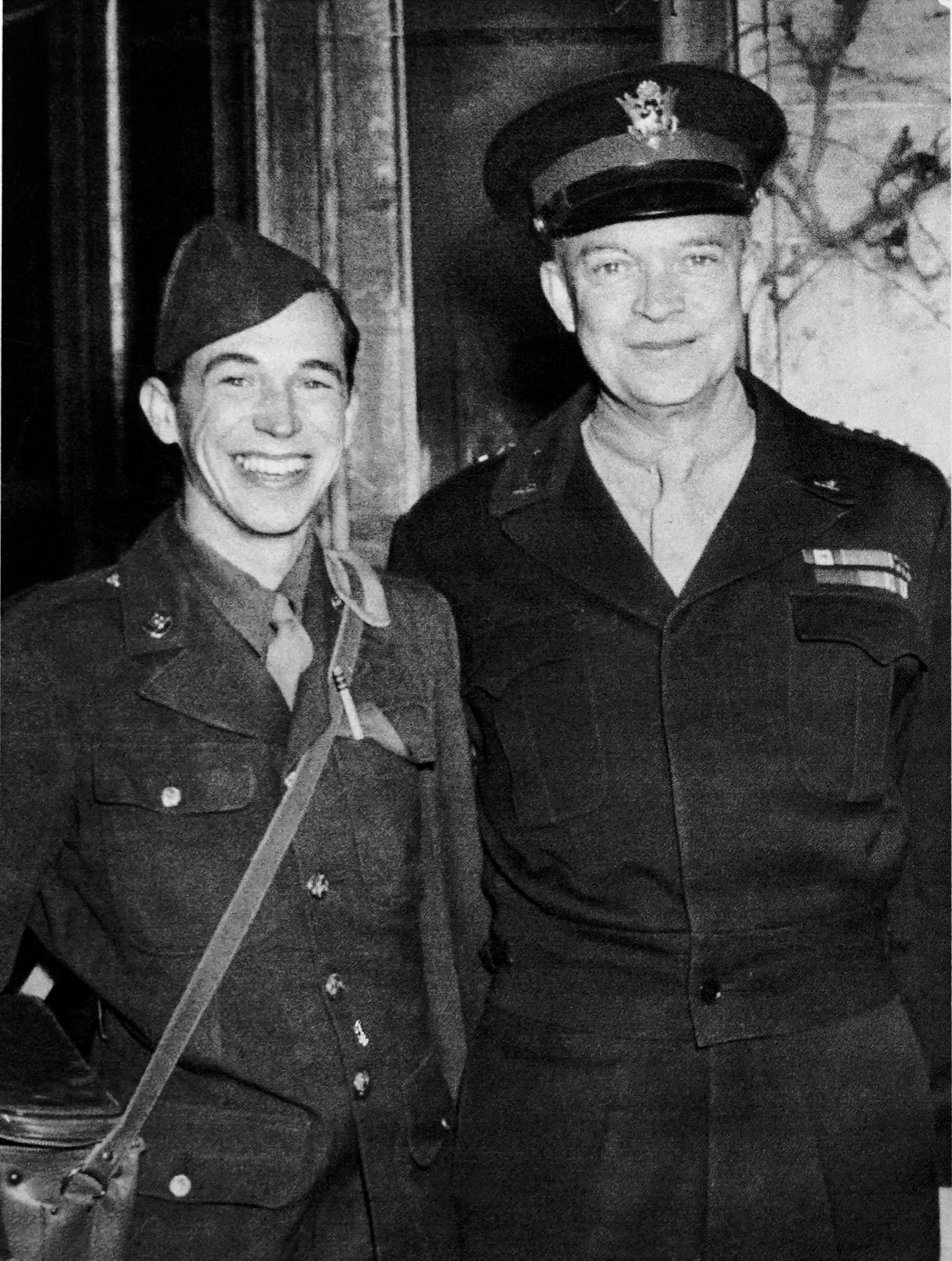
Albert Meserlin (left) with General Eisenhower

As staff photographer, he also caught the surrender ceremony on camera. In May 1945, the surrender took place in a windowless room in a corner of a small red-brick schoolhouse – the temporary headquarters of General Dwight Eisenhower, commander-in-chief of the Allied Forces.

Meserlin was in a small photography unit that lost two men in the D-Day battle at Utah Beach in France. His unit was responsible for taking photographs for newspapers and military archives.

Meserlin received a Bronze Star for his service in recording the activities of the Theater Commander in all phases of the war. His devotion to duty ensured that an accurate account of General Eisenhower's activities existed for the War Department.
