= William Sanders (politician) =

British Labour Party politician

William Stephen Sanders
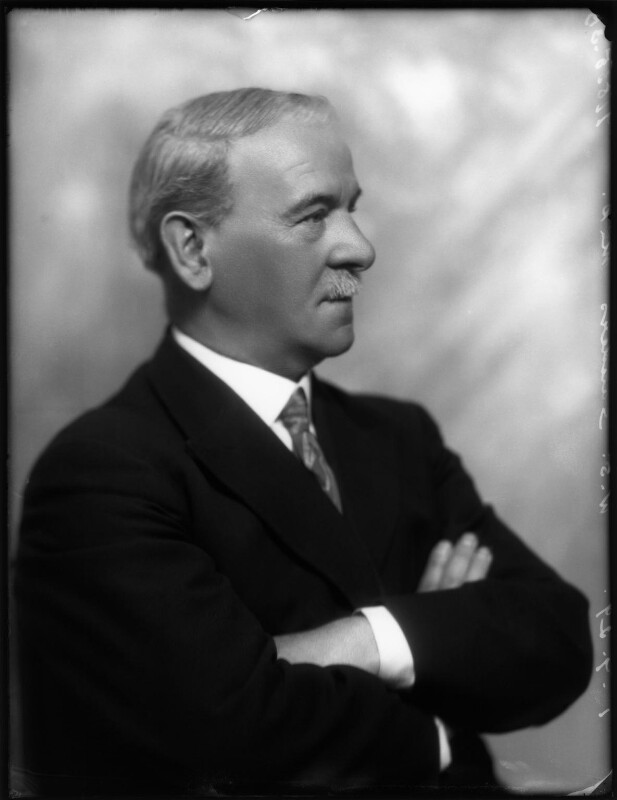
- Born: 2 January 1871
- Died: 6 February 1941 (aged 70)
- Occupation: Politician
- Organization(s): Labour Party; Fabian Society; Union of Ethical Societies
- Spouse: Beatrice Sanders

Captain William Stephen Sanders CBE (2 January 1871 – 6 February 1941) was a British Labour Party politician.

Sanders married Beatrice Martin, who later became a prominent suffragette. Both were active members of the Union of Ethical Societies (now Humanists UK), with Sanders writing and lecturing widely on its behalf, and acting as chair of the Council.

Sanders unsuccessfully contested Portsmouth in 1906 and in January 1910. He was elected Member of Parliament (MP) for Battersea North at the 1929 general election and served as Financial Secretary to the War Office from 1930 to 1931, but lost his seat in 1931. He was re-elected for Battersea North at the 1935 general election, and held the seat until his resignation from the House of Commons in 1940 by accepting the post of Steward of the Manor of Northstead, a notional office-of-profit under the crown.

Parliament of the United Kingdom
Preceded by Shapurji Saklatvala	Member of Parliament for Battersea North; 1929 – 1931	Succeeded by Arthur Marsden
Preceded by Arthur Marsden	Member of Parliament for Battersea North; 1935 – 1940	Succeeded by Francis Douglas
Party political offices
Preceded by Edward R. Pease	General Secretary of the Fabian Society; 1913 – 1920	Succeeded by Frank Wallace Galton
Political offices
Preceded by Manny Shinwell	Financial Secretary to the War Office; 5 June 1930 – 3 September 1931	Succeeded by Duff Cooper
