= Douglas Jay =

British politician (1907–1996)

The Right Honourable The Lord Jay PC
- Jay, pictured in 1949

President of the Board of Trade
- In office 18 October 1964 – 29 August 1967
- Prime Minister: Harold Wilson
- Preceded by: Edward Heath
- Succeeded by: Anthony Crosland

Financial Secretary to the Treasury
- In office 23 February 1950 – 30 October 1951
- Prime Minister: Clement Attlee
- Preceded by: Glenvil Hall
- Succeeded by: John Boyd-Carpenter

Economic Secretary to the Treasury
- In office 13 November 1947 – 23 February 1950
- Prime Minister: Clement Attlee
- Preceded by: Office created
- Succeeded by: John Edwards

Member of Parliament for Battersea North
- In office 25 July 1946 – 13 May 1983
- Preceded by: Francis Douglas
- Succeeded by: Constituency abolished

Personal details
- Born: Douglas Patrick Thomas Jay; 23 March 1907
- Died: 6 March 1996 (aged 88)
- Party: Labour
- Spouse(s): Peggy Jay; Mary Thomas
- Children: 4, including Peter Jay (1937–2024), Helen and Catherine Jay (born 1945)
- Education: New College, Oxford

Douglas Patrick Thomas Jay, Baron Jay, PC (23 March 1907 – 6 March 1996) was a British Labour Party politician.

== Early life and education ==
Educated at Winchester College and New College, Oxford, Jay won the Chancellor's English Essay in 1927 and gained a First in Literae Humaniores ('Greats') in 1929. He was a Fellow of All Souls from 1930 to 1937. His early career was as an economics journalist, working for The Times (1929–33), The Economist (1933–37) and the Daily Herald (1937–41), then as a civil servant in the Ministry of Supply and the Board of Trade. From 1943 he was a personal assistant to Hugh Dalton.

== Political career ==
Jay was a convinced democratic socialist from a young age, but only joined the Labour Party in the winter of 1933–34, whereupon he became a member of Paddington constituency party. In his capacity as a journalist he was a senior figure in the XYZ Club, a clandestine organisation in the City of London dedicated to supplying Labour with financial intelligence. Alongside Evan Durbin and Hugh Gaitskell, he brought the thinking of John Maynard Keynes to the party, especially in relation to price determination.

In The Socialist Case (1937), his first book, Jay wrote: "in the case of nutrition and health, just as in the case of education, the gentleman in Whitehall really does know better what is good for people than the people know themselves". This statement was mercilessly exploited by the Conservatives and won him long-lasting notoriety; it has often been paraphrased as "the man in Whitehall knows best". In fact, in his early years Jay was rather sceptical of planning and bureaucracy when compared to his contemporaries; as Geoffrey Foote noted, he denied the "identification of planning with socialism", instead viewing Labour's creed as "being about the suppression of unearned income, not the abolition of the market economy". Later his views somewhat changed, as he became influenced by the successful operation of rationing during the war.

Jay was elected a Labour Member of Parliament for Battersea North at a by-election in July 1946, and held the seat until the constituency was abolished at the 1983 general election. After entering Westminster, he served as Economic Secretary to the Treasury from 1947 to 1950, Financial Secretary to the Treasury from 1950 to 1951 and President of the Board of Trade from 1964 until being sacked in 1967. Jay's politics during his period at the Board of Trade were characterised by a spirited fight for regional development and an aversion to currency devaluation, but it was his opposition to closer integration with Europe (see below) that led Harold Wilson to relieve him of his brief – a decision which Wilson, ever averse to conflict, explained was due to the need to have no ministers in the Cabinet over the age of 60. Jay was sworn of the Privy Council in 1951.

Jay was always fervently opposed to the UK's entry into the European Communities, and in 1970 was the first leading politician to argue that, because all three mainstream parties in Britain supported membership without seeking to represent the opposing view, only a national referendum of all electors could decide the matter in a fair manner. When that referendum eventually transpired in 1975, he campaigned for a 'no' vote.

== Honours ==
Jay was created a life peer as Baron Jay, of Battersea in Greater London, on 8 October 1987.

== Family ==
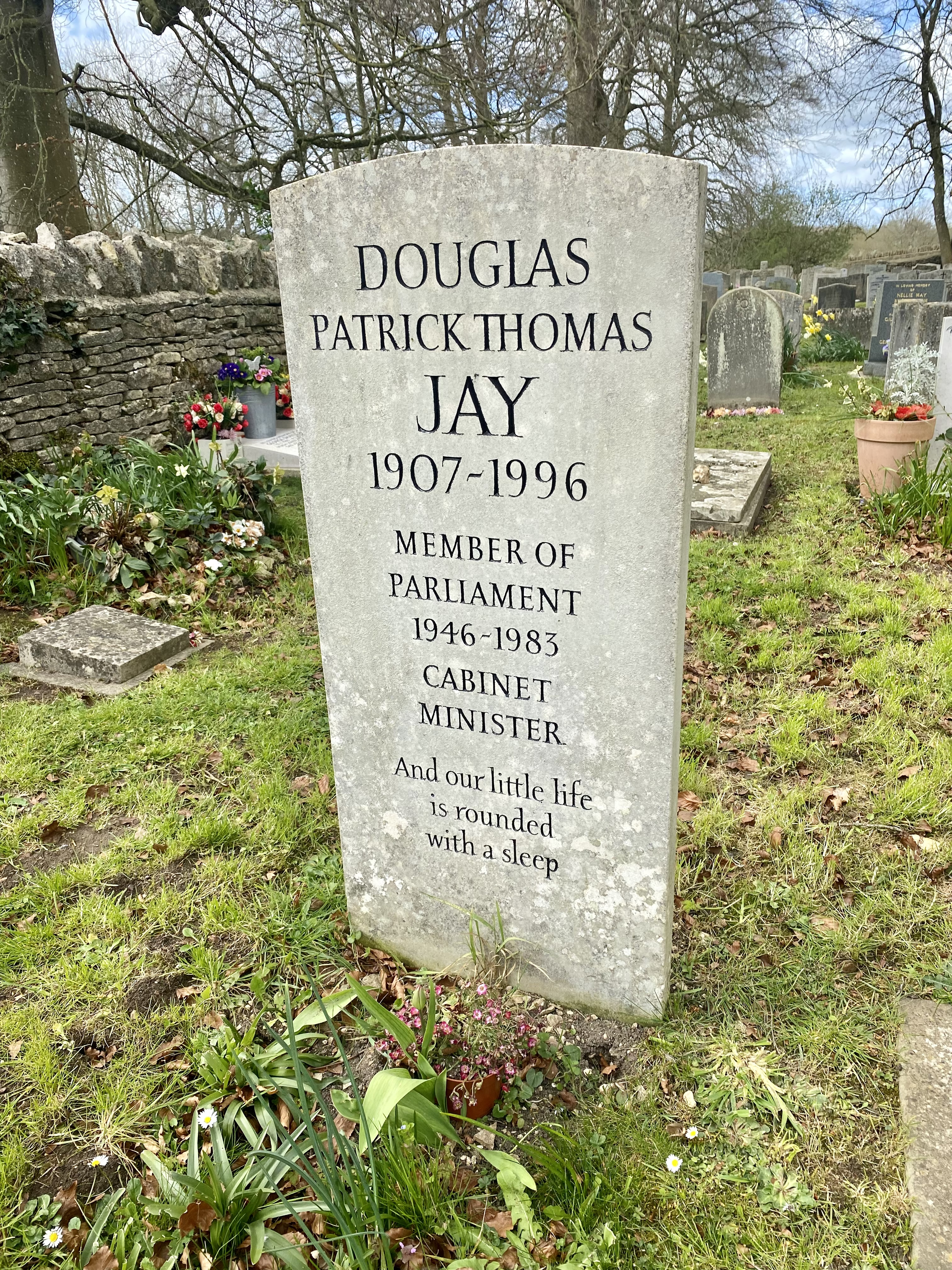
Jay's grave at St. Kenelm's Church in Minster Lovell, Oxfordshire, in 2022

In 1933 he married the councillor Peggy Jay; their marriage ended in divorce. Their eldest son was the economist Peter Jay, who married (and later divorced) Margaret Callaghan, daughter of James Callaghan with whom Douglas Jay had served in government. Their twin daughters, Helen and Catherine, achieved a fashionable profile in the 1960s. Douglas Jay's second wife, Mary Thomas, had been one of his assistant private secretaries at the Board of Trade.

== Publications ==
- The Socialist Case (1937)
- Who is to Pay for the War and the Peace? (1941)
- Socialism in the New Society (1962)
- After the Common Market (1968)
- Change and Fortune (1980) (autobiography)
- Sterling: A Plea for Moderation (1985)

== Notes and references ==
- Leigh Rayment's Historical List of MPs

Parliament of the United Kingdom
Preceded by Francis Douglas	Member of Parliament for Battersea North; 1946 – 1983	constituency abolished
Political offices
New office	Economic Secretary to the Treasury; 1947–1950	Succeeded by John Edwards
Preceded by Glenvil Hall	Financial Secretary to the Treasury; 1950–1951	Succeeded by John Boyd-Carpenter
Preceded by Edward Heath	President of the Board of Trade; 1964–1967	Succeeded by Anthony Crosland
