= 1937 Chertsey by-election =

UK Parliamentary by-election

← 1935	2 July 1937	1945 →

Constituency of Chertsey
- Turnout: 39.2% (▼21.0%)
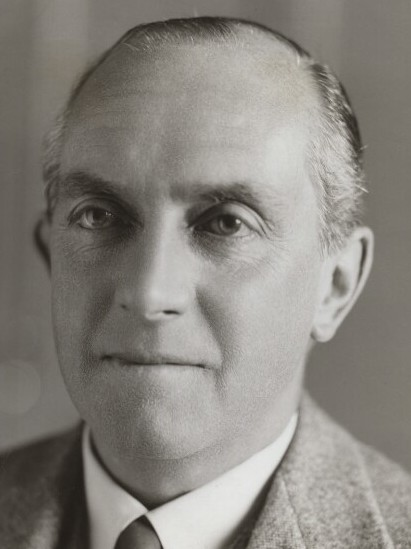
	First party	Second party
		Lib
Candidate	Arthur Marsden	Ernest Ronald Haylor
Party	Conservative	Liberal
Popular vote	19,767	10,722
Percentage	64.8%	35.2%
Swing	▼6.6%	▲6.6%
MP before election
Archibald Boyd-Carpenter
Conservative
Subsequent MP
Arthur Marsden
Conservative

The 1937 Chertsey by-election was held on 2 July 1937. The by-election was held due to the death of the incumbent Conservative MP, Archibald Boyd-Carpenter.

== Candidates ==
The Liberal Party selected Ronald Haylor, a Buckingham Gate Barrister. He was educated at the Leys and Trinity College, Oxford. He played hockey for Oxford University and rugby union for a leading London club. He was Liberal Party candidate at Windsor in the 1929 general election and at Totnes for the general elections of 1931 and 1935. There were growing moves for a Popular Front, where parties of the left came together to oppose fascism and Nazi appeasement. In Chertsey, a local Popular Front was formed, which hoped to see the Liberal and Labour parties support a progressive candidate. They launched a charter in February 1937. Haylor was given the backing of the Chertsey Popular Front and added the suffix of 'Progressive' to the party label.

At first, a three-cornered contest had been expected between the Conservative candidate, the retired naval officer Arthur Marsden, Haylor and Mr F. J. Tompsett, a City rubber broker, who was to have stood as an Independent and anti-Communist. However, Tompsett decided to withdraw in favour of Marsden.

== Result ==
The Conservative Party held the seat with a reduced majority.

Chertsey by-election, 1937
Party	Candidate	Votes	%	±%
Conservative	Arthur Marsden	19,767	64.8	−6.6
Liberal	Ernest Ronald Haylor	10,722	35.2	+6.6
Majority		9,045	29.6	−13.2
Turnout		30,489	39.2	−21.0
Conservative hold		Swing		
