= Brian Barker (journalist) =

British political activist and journalist

Brian Basil Philip Barker (born Basil Philip Barker; 13 June 1908 – 25 October 1985) was a British journalist, political activist, and publicity officer.

Barker was born in Waterloo, Merseyside, the son of William Blease Barker, a confectioner wholesaler from Liverpool, and Mary Barker, from County Monaghan, Ireland. Barker worked as a journalist in France, Germany, and the Netherlands prior to the Second World War. He was expelled from Germany because of his opposition to Nazism.

On returning to the UK, Barker became active in the Labour Party and studied at the University of Liverpool. In August 1939, he was chosen as the Labour candidate for Clapham for the 1940 London County Council election' however, Britain declared war three weeks later, and the election was not held until 1946. He instead joined the war effort by working for the government. He stood unsuccessfully in the seat for Chertsey at the 1945 United Kingdom general election.

He joined the Fabian Society, and served on its executive committee for several years in the 1940s. In 1946, he wrote Labour in London: A Study in Municipal Achievement.

In the 1950s, he was Chief Information Officer for the Ministry of Works.

Barker died in 1985 in Hampshire, aged 77.
