= Charles Harvey Combe =

British Conservative Member of Parliament (1863–1935)

Charles Harvey Combe MP
- Combe in 1895

Member of Parliament for Chertsey
- In office 1892–1897
- Preceded by: Frederick Alers Hankey
- Succeeded by: Henry Leigh-Bennett

Personal details
- Born: 18 February 1863
- Died: 14 August 1935 (aged 72)
- Party: Conservative
- Education: Eton

Charles Harvey Combe (18 February 1863 – 14 August 1935) was a Conservative Member of Parliament from 1892 and 1897 for the English constituency of Chertsey.

Combe was raised at Cobham Park. He was educated at Eton. Afterwards he travelled for three years, visiting many countries of the world. He served for three years in the Sussex Militia.

== Political career ==
In February 1892, Combe was selected by the Conservative Association for North-West Surrey to be candidate for the by-election to replace Frederick Alers Hankey, who had died that month. Combe won the by-election with 4,589 votes. The other candidate (L. J. Baker) received 2,751 votes. Combe was re-elected unopposed in the general elections of 1892 and 1895. He resigned two years later, because of his ill-health. Many years later, in 1929, Combe returned in the public eye when he was appointed as High Sheriff of Surrey.

== Brewery ==
He was the director of the brewery firm Combe & Co. In 1898 the company merged with James Watney & Co. and Reid and Co., and was subsequently known as Watney Combe & Reid. The amalgamated company was the largest brewer in London. Combe died in August 1935 at the age of 72.

Parliament of the United Kingdom
Preceded by Frederick Alers Hankey	Member of Parliament for Chertsey; 1892 – 1897	Succeeded by Henry Currie Leigh-Bennett
Honorary titles
Preceded by Edward Boustead Cuthbertson	High Sheriff of Surrey; 1929–1930	Succeeded by Hubert Cecil Rickett
