= North West Surrey =

UK Parliament constituency (1974–1997)

- Former county constituency for the House of Commons
- County: Surrey

February 1974–1997
- Seats: One
- Created from: Chertsey
- Replaced by: Surrey Heath (part); Runnymede and Weybridge (remainder)

North West Surrey was a county constituency in the county of Surrey. It returned one Member of Parliament (MP) to the House of Commons of the Parliament of the United Kingdom.

The constituency was created for the February 1974 general election, and abolished for the 1997 general election.

== Boundaries ==
1974–1997: The Urban Districts of (1) Egham, and (2) Frimley and Camberley (and the Rural District of Bagshot). In later 1974 these became respectively: (1) the Borough of Runnymede wards of Egham, Englefield Green East, Englefield Green West, Hythe, Thorpe, and Virginia Water; (2) the Borough of Surrey Heath.

== Members of Parliament ==
Election	Member	Party
Feb 1974	Sir Michael Grylls	Conservative
1997	constituency abolished: see Surrey Heath, Runnymede and Weybridge	

== Elections ==
=== Elections in the 1970s ===
General election February 1974: North West Surrey
Party	Candidate	Votes	%	±%
Conservative	Michael Grylls	28,841	52.63	
Liberal	LE Sims	13,892	25.35	
Labour	AA Clifton	11,608	21.18	
National Coalition	DB Foster	463	0.84	New
Majority		14,949	27.28	
Turnout		54,804	80.29	
Conservative hold		Swing		

General election October 1974: North West Surrey
Party	Candidate	Votes	%	±%
Conservative	Michael Grylls	25,524	52.28	
Labour	PF Whitely	11,943	24.46	
Liberal	LE Sims	11,356	23.26	
Majority		13,581	27.82	
Turnout		48,823	70.83	
Conservative hold		Swing		

General election 1979: North West Surrey
Party	Candidate	Votes	%	±%
Conservative	Michael Grylls	36,219	63.75	
Labour	Raymond Sharpe	10,763	18.94	
Liberal	D Simpson	9,037	15.91	
National Front	R Heath	796	1.40	New
Majority		25,456	44.81	
Turnout		56,815	75.55	
Conservative hold		Swing		

=== Elections in the 1980s ===
General election 1983: North West Surrey
Party	Candidate	Votes	%	±%
Conservative	Michael Grylls	35,297	64.14	
Liberal	John Weedon	14,279	25.95	
Labour	John Burrow	5,452	9.91	
Majority		21,018	38.19	
Turnout		55,028	70.21	
Conservative hold		Swing		

General election 1987: North West Surrey
Party	Candidate	Votes	%	±%
Conservative	Michael Grylls	38,535	64.00	
Liberal	Chic Brodie	14,960	24.80	
Labour	John Cooper	6,751	11.21	
Majority		23,575	39.80	
Turnout		60,246	72.51	
Conservative hold		Swing		

=== Elections in the 1990s ===
General election 1992: North West Surrey
Party	Candidate	Votes	%	±%
Conservative	Michael Grylls	41,772	63.8	−0.2
Liberal Democrats	Chris M. Clark	13,378	20.4	−4.4
Labour	Mark Hayhurst	8,886	13.6	+2.4
Green	Yvonne Hockey	1,441	2.2	New
Majority		28,394	43.4	+3.6
Turnout		65,477	78.3	+5.8
Conservative hold		Swing	+2.1	
