= Susan Hibbert =

Susan Nona Hibbert (née Heald; 21 May 1924 – 2 February 2009) was one of the secretaries who typed the English versions of the German surrender document at the conclusion of the Second World War. After her death, there was believed to be only one surviving witness to the surrender ceremony, Albert Meserlin, who died the following month, on 29 March 2009.

Hibbert was born the elder child of Sir Lionel Heald (1897–1981) and his first wife, Flavia Forbes (1902–1959), daughter of Lt.-Col. James Stewart Forbes and Lady Angela St Clair-Erskine. Through her maternal grandmother, Hibbert was a great-grandchild of Robert St Clair-Erskine, 4th Earl of Rosslyn. She was educated at Godolphin School, Salisbury.

During the Second World War Heald served as a sergeant in the Women's Auxiliary Territorial Service. She was assigned to type the English version of the German surrender. Three other secretaries typed the French, German and Russian versions. She and the other typists were present at the signing ceremony. Another assignment she received was to type the message informing the War Office in London that the war was over.

Later she worked in the Allied Control Commission, first in Frankfurt, and then in Berlin, where she met her husband Basil, a former RAF fighter pilot.

In 1950, her father Lionel Heald was elected as member of parliament for Chertsey, subsequently serving for two years as Attorney General in Winston Churchill's final administration. Susan became his secretary, and continued to work at Westminster for him and other Conservative members for the next 35 years.

Her husband, Basil, a former RAF pilot, died in 2001; the couple had no children.
