= Reginald Hankey =

English cricketer

Reginald Hankey, Esq.

Reginald Hankey (3 November 1832 – 25 August 1886) was an English cricketer, active from 1853 to 1860.

Born at Marylebone, London, Hankey was educated at Harrow School, where he captained the First XI in 1850, and at Balliol College, Oxford. He was a right-handed batsman and right-arm medium pace roundarm bowler who was mainly associated with Oxford University, Marylebone Cricket Club (MCC) and Surrey, and made 18 known appearances. He played for the Gentlemen in the Gentlemen v Players series. He made his highest score of 70 for the Gentlemen against the Players at Lord's in 1857, when he was the highest scorer in a match which the Players won by 13 runs.

Hankey was renowned for the stylishness of his batting. His contemporary William Caffyn wrote:

If it were possible to see Dr Grace and Mr Hankey at the wickets together, each well set, and each unknown to the spectators, they would in all probability pronounce Mr Hankey the finer batsman of the pair. There was, in my opinion, no hit on the board which Mr Hankey was unable to make equally as well as Dr Grace or any one else; and so it was with many others of the old players.

Caffyn went on to say that Grace surpassed all others because he made fewer mistakes, "and would continue to occupy the wickets long after his companion had been compelled to retire to the pavilion".

Hankey was unable to play more than a few matches of cricket owing to the requirements of his work in the family banking business. He died aged 53 in 1886 in Brighton, Sussex. His cousin Frederick Hankey also played for MCC, and was later an MP.
