= Michael Grylls =

British Conservative politician (1934–2001)

Sir Michael Grylls

Member of Parliament for North West Surrey Chertsey (1970–1974)
- In office 18 June 1970 – 8 April 1997
- Preceded by: Lionel Heald
- Succeeded by: Constituency abolished

Personal details
- Born: William Michael John Grylls; 21 February 1934 Folkestone, England
- Died: 7 February 2001 (aged 66) Winterborne Zelston, England
- Party: Conservative
- Spouse: Sarah Ford (m. 1965)
- Children: 2; including Bear Grylls
- Education: Royal Naval College, Dartmouth; University of Madrid

Military service
- Allegiance: United Kingdom
- Branch/service: Royal Marines
- Years of service: 1952-1955

Sir William Michael John Grylls (21 February 1934 – 7 February 2001) was a British Conservative politician who was an MP from 1970 to 1997. He was implicated in the cash-for-questions affair, a political scandal of the 1990s. He was the father of adventurer and the former Scout Association Chief Scout Bear Grylls.

== Background ==
Grylls was born in Folkestone, Kent, the son of Brigadier William Edward Harvey Grylls OBE, of the 15th/19th The King's Royal Hussars, and Rachel Elizabeth, daughter of Brigadier General Kempster Kenmure Knapp and a cousin of the journalist and Conservative politician Bill Deedes. The Grylls family owned and lived at Winterborne Zelston House, near Blandford, Dorset; the family can be traced back to 17th century Cornwall. He was educated at the Royal Naval College, Dartmouth. His eyesight was not good enough for the Navy, so he joined the Royal Marines, and saw active service, leaving in 1955, and studying Spanish at the University of Madrid.

He turned his hand to business, setting up a wine importing firm called the 'Costa Brava Company'. His description of some of his products as "Spanish champagne" provoked the ire of both the makers of genuine champagne and its London importers; he was unsuccessfully prosecuted for trading under a false description, but they won a civil action against him for "passing off", i.e. misrepresenting his goods by using someone else's trademark.

From 1959 he served as a councillor on St. Pancras Borough Council, and was elected to the Greater London Council for Westminster and the City of London from 1967 to 1970.

=== Family ===
Grylls married Sarah (Sally) Smiles Justice Ford, the daughter of Patricia Ford, Lady Fisher, briefly an Ulster Unionist MP, and cricketer Neville Montagu Ford. Sally is the stepdaughter of Conservative MP Nigel Fisher and the stepsister of Labour MP Mark Fisher. The Gryllses have one daughter, Lara Sarah Grylls, and one son, Edward Michael "Bear" Grylls, the adventurer, TV presenter and the Scout Association’s Chief Scout, who is most recognised as the host of Born Survivor.

== Career as Member of Parliament ==
Grylls was an unsuccessful candidate in the Fulham constituency in both the 1964 and 1966 general elections. At the 1970 general election, he was returned to the House of Commons as Member of Parliament for Chertsey in Surrey. His seat was abolished in boundary changes, but he was returned to Parliament for the new North West Surrey constituency in the February 1974 general election. He represented this constituency until his retirement at the 1997 election.

The Times called him "the debonair face of free-market economics". However, Andrew Roth accused Grylls of "opportunistic deviations" from his ideology; he said that Grylls's stance against state interference in business did not preclude him from supporting public funds for British Aerospace, a large employer in his constituency.

He was knighted in the 1992 New Years Honours List.

=== Cash for questions ===
For some years Grylls had acted as a consultant to the lobbying company run by Ian Greer at the heart of the Cash-for-Questions inquiry. The Parliamentary Commissioner for Standards, Sir Gordon Downey, stated that Grylls had "seriously misled" the select committee on members' interests in 1990 (replaced in 1995 by the Standards and Privileges Committee) by understating the number of payments he had received for introducing clients to ministers and Grylls' conduct, said Sir Gordon, had fallen "below the standards the House is entitled to expect of its members".

The Committee concluded that Grylls had "received payments from Mr Greer (though not in cash) which were neither introduction commissions nor fees associated with the Unitary Tax Campaign. It is not possible to conclude that these payments originated from Mohamed Al-Fayed, although Sir Michael actively participated in the Greer lobbying operation. Sir Michael deliberately misled the Select Committee on Members' Interests in 1990 by seriously understating the number of commission payments he had received; and by omitting to inform them of other fees received from Mr Greer. Sir Michael persistently failed to declare his interests in dealings with Ministers and officials over the House of Fraser. Sir Michael's action in taking a commission payment for introducing a constituent to Mr Greer was unacceptable. There is insufficient evidence to show that Sir Michael solicited business for Mr Greer in expectation of commission payments."

== Later life ==
Grylls was a member of the Royal Yacht Squadron until his death in 2001; his widow remains an honorary member. He died at home on 7 February 2001, aged 66. In Piers Morgan's Life Stories, Bear Grylls said that his father had a pacemaker fitted, but suddenly died of a heart attack two days after his operation while recovering.

== Sources ==
- Times Guide to the House of Commons, Times Newspapers Limited, 1992 edition.

Parliament of the United Kingdom
Preceded by Sir Lionel Heald	Member of Parliament for Chertsey; 1970–Feb 1974	Constituency abolished
New constituency	Member of Parliament for North West Surrey; Feb 1974–1997	Constituency abolished
