= 1946 Battersea North by-election =

1946 UK parliamentary by-election

The 1946 Battersea North by-election was a parliamentary by-election held on 25 July 1946 for the British House of Commons constituency of Battersea North in the Metropolitan Borough of Battersea.

The seat had become vacant on the resignation from the House of Common of the constituency's Labour Member of Parliament (MP), Francis Douglas, who had been appointed as Governor of Malta and ennobled as Baron Douglas of Barloch. He had held the seat since a by-election in 1940.

== Candidates ==
The Labour Party selected as its candidate Douglas Jay, a 39-year-old economist who had been a financial journalist, a Fellow of All Souls and then (from 1941) a civil servant.

The Conservative Party candidate was B.A. Shattock, while the Liberal Party did not field a candidate.

The third candidate was 38-year-old Trotskyist and adult education tutor, Hugo Dewar of the Independent Labour Party (ILP). He had joined the ILP in 1928, and in 1929 co-founded the Marxian League. He joined the Communist Party of Great Britain in 1931, but was expelled the following year. He was one of the founders in 1932 of the Communist League, Britain's first 'official' Trotskyist group, and had remained active in 'Left Opposition' groups until he was drafted into the army in 1943.

== Election ==
On a turnout reduced to 55% from the 71% at the 1945 general election, Jay held the seat for Labour with 69% of votes, a small reduction from the 74% won by his predecessor in 1945. Shattock's 29.6% share was a small increase on the 26.1% Conservative vote the previous year, while Dewar won only 240 votes (1.5%) of the total, and lost his deposit.

== Aftermath ==
Jay joined the government the following year as Economic Secretary to the Treasury, and held several other government offices before his retirement from the House of Commons in 1983. He was made a life peer in 1987.

== Previous result ==
General election 1945: Battersea North
Party	Candidate	Votes	%	±%
Labour	Francis Douglas	14,070	73.9	+15.2
Conservative	J G W Paget	4,969	26.1	−15.2
Majority		9,101	47.8	+30.5
Turnout		19,039	71.1	+7.6
Labour hold		Swing	+15.2	

== Result ==
Battersea North by-election, 1946
Party	Candidate	Votes	%	±%
Labour	Douglas Jay	11,329	68.9	−5.0
Conservative	B A Shattock	4,858	29.6	+3.5
Ind. Labour Party	Hugo Dewar	240	1.5	New
Majority		6,471	39.3	−8.5
Turnout		16,427	55.4	−15.7
Labour hold		Swing		

== See also ==
- Battersea North constituency
- 1940 Battersea North by-election
- Battersea
- List of United Kingdom by-elections
- United Kingdom by-election records

== Sources ==
- Craig, F. W. S. (1983) [1969]. British parliamentary election results 1918–1949 (3rd ed.). Chichester: Parliamentary Research Services. p. 3. ISBN 0-900178-06-X.
- Leigh Rayment's Historical List of MPs
