= 1892 Chertsey by-election =

UK parliamentary by-election

The 1892 Chertsey by-election was a parliamentary by-election held on 3 March 1892 for the British House of Commons constituency of Chertsey. It was caused by the death of the constituency's sitting Conservative Member of Parliament Frederick Alers Hankey, who had held the seat since the 1885 general election.

== Result ==
The seat was held for the Conservatives by Charles Harvey Combe of Cobham Park.

Chertsey by-election, 1892: Chertsey
Party	Candidate	Votes	%	±%
Conservative	Charles Harvey Combe	4,589	62.5	N/A
Liberal	Lawrence James Baker	2,751	37.5	New
Majority		1,838	25.0	N/A
Turnout		7,340	71.7	N/A
Conservative hold		Swing	N/A	
