= Hugo Dewar =

British poet and political activist

Hugo Dewar (9 August 1908 – June 1980) was an author, poet, and political activist influential in co-founding two of the earliest British Trotskyist groups.

Dewar was born in Leyton in London in 1908. He joined the Independent Labour Party in 1928, and in 1930 co-founded the Marxian League (a.k.a. Marxist League). He joined the Communist Party of Great Britain in 1931, but was expelled the following year. He was one of the founders in 1932 of the Communist League, and remained active in International Left Opposition groups until he was drafted into the army in 1943. He worked as an adult education tutor.

In 1946, Dewar stood unsuccessfully for the ILP in the Battersea North by-election.

In early 1938 in London, Dewar married Margareta Watzova (1901-1995), a fellow Communist and Trotskyist, who had been born in Latvia in the Russian Empire.

Dewar died in West Sussex in 1980.

== Selected bibliography ==
- Within the Thunder. Poems of a Conscript (Porcupine Press, 1946)
- Assassins at Large (Wingate, 1951)
- The Modern Inquisition (Wingate, 1953)
- Revolution and Counter-Revolution in Hungary with Daniel Norman (Socialist Union of Central-Eastern Europe, 1957)
- Communist Politics in Britain: The CPGB From its Origins to the Second World War (Pluto, 1976)
