= Archibald Boyd-Carpenter =

British politician (1873–1937)

Major Sir Archibald Boyd-Carpenter
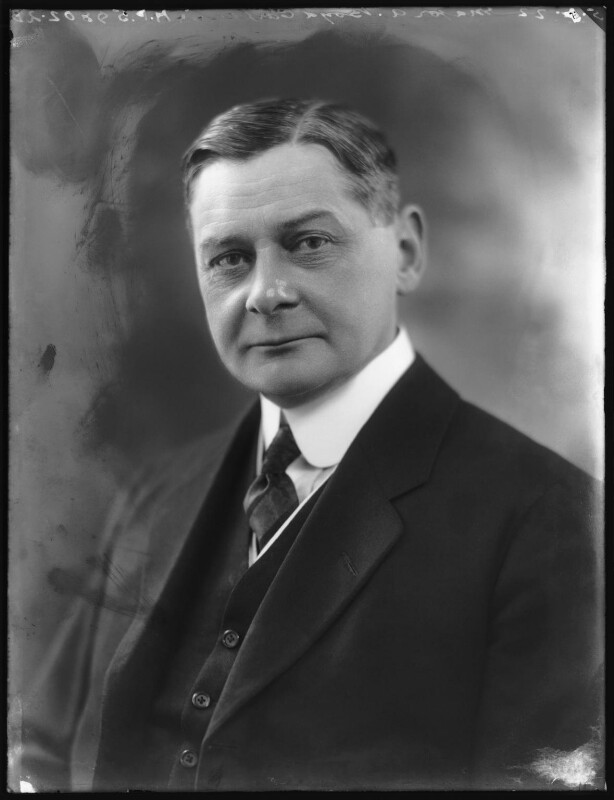

Paymaster General
- In office May 1923 – January 1924
- Prime Minister: Stanley Baldwin
- Preceded by: William Joynson-Hicks
- Succeeded by: Harry Gosling

Parliamentary and Financial Secretary to the Admiralty
- In office May 1923 – January 1924
- Prime Minister: Stanley Baldwin
- Preceded by: Bolton Eyres-Monsell
- Succeeded by: Charles Ammon

Financial Secretary to the Treasury
- In office March 1923 – May 1923
- Prime Minister: Bonar Law
- Preceded by: John Hills
- Succeeded by: William Joynson-Hicks

Parliamentary Secretary to the Ministry of Labour
- In office November 1922 – March 1923
- Prime Minister: Bonar Law
- Preceded by: Anderson Montague-Barlow
- Succeeded by: Henry Betterton

Member of Parliament for Chertsey
- In office 27 October 1931 – 27 May 1937
- Preceded by: Sir Philip Richardson, Bt
- Succeeded by: Arthur Marsden

Member of Parliament for Coventry
- In office 29 October 1924 – 10 May 1929
- Preceded by: A. A. Purcell
- Succeeded by: Philip Noel-Baker

Member of Parliament for Bradford North
- In office 14 December 1918 – 16 November 1923
- Preceded by: Constituency established
- Succeeded by: Walter Rea

Personal details
- Born: 26 March 1873
- Died: 27 May 1937 (aged 64) Harrogate, West Riding of Yorkshire, England
- Party: Conservative
- Spouse: Annie Dugdale (m. 1907)
- Children: 2, including John
- Parent: William Boyd-Carpenter (father)
- Education: Harrow School
- Alma mater: Balliol College, Oxford

Military service
- Allegiance: United Kingdom
- Branch/service: British Army
- Rank: Captain
- Battles/wars: Second Boer War; World War I

Major Sir Archibald Boyd Boyd-Carpenter (26 March 1873 – 27 May 1937) was a British Conservative Party politician.

== Career ==
The fourth son of William Boyd-Carpenter, Bishop of Ripon and Canon of Westminster, Archibald Boyd-Carpenter was educated at Harrow School and at Balliol College, Oxford, where he was Secretary and President of the Oxford Union. Following college he worked for three years in the editorial staff of the Yorkshire Post.

With the start of the Second Boer War in late 1899, Boyd-Carpenter volunteered for active service and was commissioned with the Imperial Yeomanry, seeing service in South Africa attached to the Highland Light Infantry. He was promoted to captain on 17 April 1901, and was from 1901 to 1902 Staff Captain to Major-General Lord Chesham, and Brigadier General Herbert Belfield while they served as Inspector general of Imperial Yeomanry.

For his service in the war, he was mentioned in dispatches and awarded the Queen's medal (with 3 clasps) and the King's medal (with 2 clasps). After the war ended in June 1902, he returned home with Belfield in the SS Kinfauns Castle leaving Cape Town two months later, and relinquished his commission in the Imperial Yeomanry in October 1902. He later served in the First World War.

He was Mayor of Harrogate, 1909–1910 and 1910–1911; Alderman of the Borough and represented Harrogate on the West Riding County Council, 1910–1919. He was elected as Conservative Member of Parliament (MP) for Bradford North from 1918 to 1923, for Coventry from 1924 to 1929 and for Chertsey from 1931.

Boyd-Carpenter held ministerial office as Parliamentary Secretary to the Ministry of Labour from November 1922 until March 1923, Financial Secretary to the Treasury from March to May 1923, Parliamentary and Financial Secretary to the Admiralty and Paymaster General from May 1923 until January 1924. Boyd-Carpenter was knighted in the 1926 Birthday Honours.

Boyd-Carpenter married Annie Dugdale in 1907 and they had a son and daughter. He died on 27 May 1937 in Harrogate, aged 64.

His son, John, was also a Conservative MP and Minister.

Parliament of the United Kingdom
New constituency	Member of Parliament for Bradford North; 1918–1923	Succeeded by Walter Rea
Preceded by A. A. Purcell	Member of Parliament for Coventry; 1924–1929	Succeeded by Philip Noel-Baker
Preceded by Sir Philip Richardson, Bt	Member of Parliament for Chertsey; 1931–1937	Succeeded by Arthur Marsden
Political offices
Preceded by Anderson Montague-Barlow	Parliamentary Secretary to the Ministry of Labour; Nov 1922 – Mar 1923	Succeeded by Henry Betterton
Preceded by John Hills	Financial Secretary to the Treasury; March 1923 – May 1923	Succeeded by William Joynson-Hicks
Preceded by Bolton Eyres-Monsell	Parliamentary and Financial Secretary to the Admiralty; May 1923 – Jan 1924	Succeeded by Charles Ammon
Preceded by William Joynson-Hicks	Paymaster General; May 1923 – Jan 1924	Succeeded by Harry Gosling
