= Henry Leigh-Bennett =

British politician

- Born: 1852
- Died: 7 March 1903
- Occupations: Politician, barrister

Henry Currie Leigh-Bennett (1852 – 7 March 1903, Windlesham) was a Conservative Member of Parliament for the English constituency of Chertsey from 1897 until his death in 1903.

== Biography ==
Leigh-Bennett (eldest son of the Revd. Henry Leigh-Bennett of Thorpe Place, Chertsey, and his wife Caroline, daughter of G.H. Crutchley of Sunninghill Park, Berkshire) was educated at Winchester College (Moberly's, entered Short Half, 1864), and at New College, Oxford. He graduated as a B.A. in 1875, and being called to the Bar at the Inner Temple, in 1878, when he joined the Oxford Circuit. For many years Leigh Bennett devoted the greater part of his time to public work in the district of Surrey in which he resided, and held several political offices. At the by-election of 1897 Leigh-Bennett was elected as MP.

Apart from being an MP, he also was a director at the London and South Western Railway and a fellow of the Royal Society of Literature.

In February 1903, while visiting a friend in Woking, Leigh-Bennett suddenly fell ill. Three weeks later he died of appendicitis.

He was married to Florence Nightingale Leigh-Bennett, daughter of Thomas Miller Mackay. His son, Coldstream Guards' Captain Arthur Leigh-Bennett was born 25 November 1885 and was killed in action near Vermelles on 3 October 1915, while serving with the 2nd Battalion.

Parliament of the United Kingdom
Preceded by Charles Harvey Combe	Member of Parliament for Chertsey; 1897–1903	Succeeded by John Arthur Fyler
