= Arthur Marsden (politician) =

British politician (1883–1960)

Captain Arthur Marsden
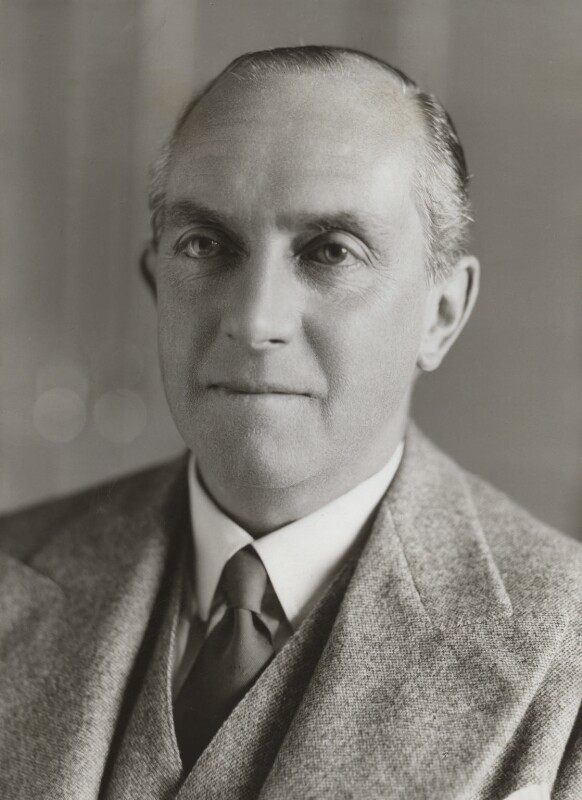

Member of Parliament for Chertsey
- In office 2 July 1937 – 3 February 1950
- Preceded by: Archibald Boyd-Carpenter
- Succeeded by: Lionel Heald

Member of Parliament for Battersea North
- In office 27 October 1931 – 25 October 1935
- Preceded by: William Sanders
- Succeeded by: William Sanders

Personal details
- Born: 1883
- Died: 26 November 1960 (aged 76–77)
- Party: Conservative

Military service
- Allegiance: United Kingdom
- Branch/service: Royal Navy
- Rank: Captain
- Battles/wars: World War I: Battle of Jutland

Arthur Marsden (1883 – 26 November 1960) was a Royal Navy officer who became a British Conservative Party politician. He served as a Member of Parliament (MP) from 1931 to 1935 and from 1937 to 1950.

== Naval career ==
Marsden was made a Royal Navy Sub-lieutenant on 15 November 1902 and was promoted to lieutenant on 31 August 1904. He later was promoted to lieutenant commander, and as such was in command of the Acasta-class destroyer HMS Ardent in 1916 at the Battle of Jutland. The Nassau-class battleship SMS Westfalen sank Ardent, but Marsden was commended for his service in the battle. Later Marsden was promoted to captain, and on 5 October 1920 he transferred to the Royal Navy Retired List.

== Political career ==
Marsden first stood for election to the House of Commons at the 1929 general election, when he unsuccessfully contested the Communist-held Northern division of Battersea. In a four-way contest, the seat was won by the William Sanders of the Labour Party, and when Labour's vote collapsed at the 1931 general election, Marsden won the seat from Sanders.

Sanders regained the seat at the 1935 general election, but Marsden returned to Parliament two years later when he won a by-election in July 1937 in the safely-Conservative Chertsey division of Surrey. He held the seat until he retired from the Commons at the 1950 general election.

Parliament of the United Kingdom
| Preceded by William Sanders | Member of Parliament for Battersea North; 1931–1935 | Succeeded by William Sanders |
| Preceded by Archibald Boyd-Carpenter | Member of Parliament for Chertsey; 1937–1950 | Succeeded by Lionel Heald |
