= Francis Douglas, 1st Baron Douglas of Barloch =

Francis Campbell Ross Douglas, 1st Baron Douglas of Barloch KCMG (21 October 1889 – 30 March 1980), was a British journalist, solicitor and Labour Party politician.

== Early life ==
Douglas was born in Wakopa, Manitoba, Canada to a Scottish family. He was educated at Glasgow University and later became a partner in Douglas & Company, solicitors, and also worked as a journalist. A member of Battersea Borough Council, he was mayor of Battersea in 1922–1923.

== Parliamentary career ==
Having unsuccessfully fought Yeovil in 1929, he was elected as the Member of Parliament (MP) for Battersea North at a by-election in 1940, a seat he held until 1946, and served as Parliamentary Private Secretary to the Parliamentary Secretary to the Board of Education from 1940 to 1945 and to the Home Secretary from 1945 to 1946 (James Chuter Ede held both positions).

He was an advocate of land-value rating and in 1936 wrote a book, revised in 1961, "to present a concise summary of the economic arguments in favour of the rating of land values".

== After the Commons ==
In 1946 Douglas resigned from the House of Commons on being appointed Governor of Malta, which he remained until 1949. Douglas was made a KCMG in 1947 and in 1950 he was raised to the peerage as Baron Douglas of Barloch, of Maxfield in the County of Sussex. He was also a member of the Public Works Loan Board from 1936 to 1946 and of the Railway Assessment Committee from 1938 to 1946 and served as Chairman of the Finance Committee of the London County Council from 1940 to 1946. After being raised to the peerage he was a Deputy Speaker of the House of Lords.

Lord Douglas of Barloch died in March 1980, aged 90. The title became extinct on his death.

Parliament of the United Kingdom
Preceded by William Sanders	Member of Parliament for Battersea North; 1940 – 1946	Succeeded by Douglas Jay
Political offices
Preceded by Charles Latham, 1st Baron Latham	Chairman of the Finance Committee of London County Council; 1940–1946	Succeeded by Donald Daines
Government offices
Preceded by Sir Edmond Schreiber	Governor of Malta; 1946–1949	Succeeded by Sir Gerald Creasy
Peerage of the United Kingdom
New creation	Baron Douglas of Barloch; 1950–1980	Extinct
