= Frederick Hankey =

Frederick Hankey may refer to:

- Frederick Hankey (politician), English banker, politician and cricketer
- Frederick Hankey (diplomat), British army officer, diplomat and colonial administrator
