= Longman baronets =

Extinct baronetcy in the Baronetage of the United Kingdom

- Escutcheon of the Longman baronets of Lavershot Hall
- Creation date: 1909
- Status: extinct
- Extinction date: 1940

The Longman baronetcy, of Lavershot Hall in the Parish of Windlesham in the County of Surrey, was a title created on 23 July 1909 for Hubert Longman, a partner in Longmans, Green & Co, publishers, and a justice of the peace and county councillor for Surrey. The title became extinct on his death in 1940.

== Longman baronets, of Lavershot Hall (1909) ==
- Sir Hubert Harry Longman, 1st Baronet (1856–1940), died without heir.

== Notes ==
Baronetage of the United Kingdom
Preceded by Lakin baronets	Longman baronets of Lavershot Hall; 23 July 1909	Succeeded by Morris baronets
