= Parliamentary constituencies in Surrey =

The ceremonial county of Surrey is divided into 11 parliamentary constituencies which are wholly within the county boundaries. In addition, there are two constituencies which cross the county boundary - one with Hampshire (Farnham and Bordon) and one with Berkshire (Windsor). These thirteen seats are sub-classified into three of borough type and ten of county status, affecting the level of expenses permitted and the status of the returning officer.

Surrey residents comprise a majority of the Farnham and Bordon constituency, with Hampshire residents in the minority. However, in the Windsor constituency Surrey residents comprise only a small minority, with the overwhelming majority being Berkshire residents.

One might therefore say that there are effectively 12 ‘Surrey constituencies’ in all - 11 seats that are wholly in Surrey, plus the Farnham and Bordon constituency where Surrey residents are in the majority, where the Surrey town of Farnham is the main town within the seat, and where Surrey constitutes the majority of the land area of the seat.

The county saw the vast bulk of its population and seats removed on the creation of the County of London in 1889 and its wider replacement by the county of Greater London in 1965.

Reflecting its mainly suburban and rural (and relatively prosperous) nature, all the seats covering the present definition of Surrey were held by Conservative MPs at each and every general election since 1885, with the exception of three Liberals in 1906, one Liberal Democrat in 2001, and six Liberal Democrats in 2024.

== Constituencies ==
† Conservative ‡ Labour ¤ Liberal Democrat

Constituency (Note: BC denotes borough constituency, CC denotes county constituency.)	Electorate	Majority (Note: The majority is the number of votes the winning candidate receives more than their nearest rival.)	Member of Parliament	Nearest opposition	Map
Dorking and Horley	71,300	5,391	Chris Coghlan¤	Marisa Heath†	
East Surrey	73,307	7,450	Claire Coutinho†	Tom Bowell‡	
Epsom and Ewell	77,530	3,686	Helen Maguire¤	Mhairi Fraser†	
Esher and Walton	74,042	12,003	Monica Harding¤	John Cope†	
Farnham and Bordon (Part)	75,918	1,349	Greg Stafford†	Khalil Yousuf¤	
Godalming and Ash	74,168	891	Jeremy Hunt†	Paul Follows¤	
Guildford	70,734	8,429	Zöe Franklin¤	Angela Richardson†	
Reigate	77,101	3,187	Rebecca Paul†	Stuart Brady‡	
Runnymede and Weybridge	73,610	7,627	Ben Spencer†	Ellen Nicholson¤	
Spelthorne	73,782	1,590	Lincoln Jopp†	Claire Tighe‡	
Surrey Heath	71,934	5,640	Alasdair Pinkerton¤	Ed McGuinness†	
Windsor (Part)	73,334	6,457	Jack Rankin †	Pavitar Mann ‡	
Woking	72,977	11,246	Will Forster¤	Jonathan Lord†	

== Historic list of constituencies in Surrey ==
=== Used from 1950 to 1974 ===
- Chertsey
- Dorking
- Epsom
- Esher
- Farnham
- Guildford
- Reigate
- East Surrey
- Spelthorne (previous county: Middlesex abolished in 1965)
- Woking

Eleven other seats fell within the north-east of Surrey until 1965, forming the metropolitan part closest to London and the majority of the population (shown in the Historical Representation tables below). These were moved into Greater London leaving a predominantly suburban and rural content.

=== Used from 1974 to 1983 ===
- Chertsey and Walton
- Dorking
- East Surrey
- Epsom and Ewell
- Esher
- Farnham
- Guildford
- North West Surrey
- Reigate
- Spelthorne
- Woking

=== Used from 1983 to 1997 ===
- Chertsey and Walton
- East Surrey
- Epsom and Ewell
- Esher
- Mole Valley
- Guildford
- North West Surrey
- Reigate
- South West Surrey
- Spelthorne
- Woking

== 2010 boundary changes ==
Under the fifth periodic review of Westminster constituencies, the Boundary Commission for England decided to retain the existing 11 constituencies in Surrey, with only very minor changes to four of them.

Name
1. East Surrey CC
2. Epsom and Ewell BC
3. Esher and Walton BC
4. Guildford CC
5. Mole Valley CC
6. Reigate BC
7. Runnymede and Weybridge CC
8. South West Surrey CC
9. Spelthorne BC
10. Surrey Heath CC
11. Woking CC
Boundaries 1997–2010

Parliamentary constituencies in Surrey

Boundaries 2010–present

Proposed Revision

== 2024 boundary changes ==
See 2023 review of Westminster constituencies for further details.

Former name
1. East Surrey CC
2. Epsom and Ewell BC
3. Esher and Walton BC
4. Guildford CC
5. Mole Valley CC
6. Reigate BC
7. Runnymede and Weybridge CC
8. South West Surrey CC
9. Spelthorne BC
10. Surrey Heath CC
11. Woking CC
Boundaries 2010–2024

Proposed Revision

Current name
1. Dorking and Horley CC
2. East Surrey CC
3. Epsom and Ewell BC
4. Esher and Walton BC
5. Farnham and Borden CC
6. Godalming and Ash CC
7. Guildford CC
8. Reigate CC
9. Runnymede and Weybridge CC
10. Spelthorne BC
11. Surrey Heath CC
12. Windsor CC
13. Woking CC
Boundaries 2024–present

For the 2023 review of Westminster constituencies, which redrew the constituency map ahead of the 2024 United Kingdom general election, the Boundary Commission for England opted to combine Surrey with Berkshire and Hampshire as a sub-region of the South East Region.

As a result, the majority of the abolished constituency of South West Surrey was combined with parts of the constituency of East Hampshire to form a cross-county boundary constituency named Farnham and Bordon. The remainder of South West Surrey was combined with parts of Guildford, Mole Valley and Surrey Heath to form the new constituency of Godalming and Ash. The communities of Englefield Green and Virginia Water in the borough of Runnymede were included in the Berkshire constituency of Windsor.

Following some significant changes to Mole Valley, this constituency was renamed Dorking and Horley.

Other boundary changes included the Woking constituency losing its two Guildford Borough Council villages of Normandy and Pirbright to a revised Surrey Heath constituency. Woking constituency thereby became coterminous with the Woking Borough Council area for the first time in its history as a Parliamentary seat.

The eleven boroughs and districts that constitute the modern county of Surrey contributed to the twelve Surrey constituencies (plus the Berkshire constituency of Windsor) as follows:

Containing electoral wards from Elmbridge

- Esher and Walton
- Runnymede and Weybridge (part)

Containing electoral wards from Epsom and Ewell

- Epsom and Ewell (part)

Containing electoral wards from Guildford

- Guildford
- Surrey Heath (part)
- Godalming and Ash (part)

Containing electoral wards from Mole Valley

- Dorking and Horley (part)
- Epsom and Ewell (part)

Containing electoral wards from Reigate and Banstead

- Dorking and Horley (part)
- East Surrey (part)
- Reigate

Containing electoral wards from Runnymede

- Runnymede and Weybridge (part)
- Windsor (parts also in the Boroughs of Slough, and Windsor and Maidenhead in Berkshire)

Containing electoral wards from Spelthorne

- Spelthorne

Containing electoral wards from Surrey Heath

- Surrey Heath (part)

Containing electoral wards from Tandridge

- East Surrey (part)

Containing electoral wards from Waverley

- Dorking and Horley (part)
- Farnham and Bordon (part also in the District of East Hampshire)
- Godalming and Ash (part)

Containing electoral wards from Woking

- Woking

== Results history ==
Primary data source: House of Commons research briefing – General election results from 1918 to 2019

=== 2024 ===
The number of votes cast for each political party that fielded candidates in the twelve constituencies comprising Surrey in the 2024 general election were as follows in the chart below: (Note: Vote shares include the cross-county constituency of Farnham and Bordon which has a majority Surrey electorate, and excludes the cross-county constituency of Windsor which has a majority Berkshire electorate.)

(N.B. In 2024, the Conservative Party lost five seats on their previous total of holding all eleven Surrey constituencies at the 2019 general election. However, given that all twelve revised Surrey seats in 2024 - including the ‘new’ seat of Godalming and Ash - had all been notionally Conservative on the 2019 general election results, one might equally well argue that the Conservatives lost six Surrey seats in 2024, half of the total).

Party	Votes	%	Change from 2019	Seats	Change from 2019
Liberal Democrats	213,388	35.1%	▲6.5%	6	▲6
Conservative	202,906	33.4%	▼20.3%	6	▼5
Labour	84,921	14.0%	▲1.3%	0	0
Reform	74,360	12.2%	New	0	0
Greens	26,741	4.4%	▲1.7%	0	0
Others	4,768	0.8%	▼1.4%	0	0
Total	607,084	100.0		12	

=== Percentage votes ===
Note that before 1974 Surrey included a considerable part of what is now London.

Election year	1924	1929	1935	1945	1950	1951	1955	1959	1964	1966	1970	1974 (Feb)	1974 (Oct)	1979	1983	1987	1992	1997	2001	2005	2010	2015	2017	2019	2024
Liberal Democrat^{1}	23.6	25.7	3.9	9.0	9.8	2.3	2.7	10.3	18.4	16.5	13.8	29.3	25.6	19.8	28.6	27.6	25.5	24.5	27.0	28.4	28.5	9.8	13.3	28.6	35.1
Conservative	71.8	53.8	69.8	49.9	55.8	61.0	62.4	59.9	51.6	50.1	55.6	50.2	50.5	59.3	59.4	60.6	59.9	46.2	47.6	50.5	55.2	58.1	58.6	53.7	33.4
Labour	4.6	20.5	26.3	40.7	34.4	36.8	34.9	29.9	29.9	33.3	30.3	20.1	23.5	20.2	11.0	11.4	13.6	22.3	21.8	16.7	9.8	13.0	21.2	12.7	14.0
Reform	–	–	–	–	–	–	–	–	–	–	–	–	–	–	–	–	–	-	-	-	-	-	-	-	12.2
Green Party	–	–	–	–	–	–	–	–	–	–	–	–	–	–	–	*	*	*	*	*	0.6	4.6	2.3	2.7	4.4
UKIP	–	–	–	–	–	–	–	–	–	–	–	–	–	–	–	–	–	*	*	*	4.8	12.9	2.0	*	*
Other	–	–	–	0.4	0.03	–	–	–	0.1	0.1	0.3	0.4	0.5	0.7	1.1	0.4	1.1	7.0	3.6	4.4	1.1	1.6	2.6	2.2	0.8

^{1}pre-1979 – Liberal Party; 1983 & 1987 – SDP–Liberal Alliance

* Included in Other

Accurate vote percentages cannot be obtained for the elections of 1918, 1922, 1923 and 1931 because at least one candidate stood unopposed.

=== Seats ===
Election year	1974 (Feb)	1974 (Oct)	1979	1983	1987	1992	1997	2001	2005	2010	2015	2017	2019	2024
Conservative	11	11	11	11	11	11	11	10	11	11	11	11	11	6
Liberal Democrat^{1}	0	0	0	0	0	0	0	1	0	0	0	0	0	6
Total	11	11	11	11	11	11	11	11	11	11	11	11	11	12

^{1}1974 & 1979 – Liberal Party; 1983 & 1987 – SDP–Liberal Alliance

=== General Election 2019, 2017, 2015 and 2010 results ===
The following tables show the results for all Surrey constituencies in the General Elections in 2019, 2017, 2015 and 2010. The results are given as percentages.

2019	Con	Lib Dem	Lab	Green	UKIP	Other
East Surrey	59.7	19.4	13.8	3.9	–	3.2
Epsom and Ewell	53.5	23.5	17.2	3.4	–	2.4
Esher and Walton	49.4	45.0	4.5	–	–	1.2
Guildford	44.9	39.2	7.7	–	–	8.2
Mole Valley	55.4	34.3	5.2	3.3	0.8	0.9
Reigate	53.9	19.4	19.5	6.0	1.2	–
Runnymede and Weybridge	54.9	17.3	20.6	3.5	0.9	2.8
South West Surrey	53.3	38.7	7.9	–	–	–
Spelthorne	58.9	15.1	21.7	4.3	–	–
Surrey Heath	58.6	27.3	9.2	3.8	1.1	–
Woking	48.9	30.8	16.4	2.8	1.1	–
Average	53.8	28.6	12.7	2.7	0.5	1.7

2017	Con	Lab	Lib Dem	UKIP	Green	Others
East Surrey	59.6	19.2	10.5	3.8	1.9	5.0
Epsom and Ewell	59.6	25.0	12.5	–	2.9	–
Esher and Walton	58.6	19.7	17.3	1.7	1.8	0.8
Guildford	54.6	19.0	23.9	–	2.1	0.5
Mole Valley	61.9	13.9	19.3	2.4	2.6	–
Reigate	57.4	24.7	10.9	2.9	4.1	–
Runnymede and Weybridge	60.9	25.9	7.3	3.2	2.6	–
South West Surrey	55.7	12.6	9.9	1.8	–	20.0
Spelthorne	57.3	30.5	5.5	4.6	2.2	–
Surrey Heath	64.2	21.1	10.8	–	3.9	–
Woking	54.1	23.9	17.6	2.1	2.0	0.4
Average	58.5	21.9	12.8	2.5	2.4	2.4

2015	Con	Lab	UKIP	Lib Dem	Green	Others
East Surrey	57.4	11.8	17.0	9.2	3.8	0.6
Epsom and Ewell	58.3	15.5	12.5	8.8	3.7	1.3
Esher and Walton	62.9	12.7	9.7	9.4	4.1	1.1
Guildford	57.1	12.1	8.8	15.5	4.7	1.8
Mole Valley	60.6	8.3	11.2	14.5	5.4	–
Reigate	56.8	12.8	13.3	10.5	6.7	–
Runnymede and Weybridge	59.7	15.5	13.9	6.7	4.1	–
South West Surrey	59.9	9.5	9.9	6.3	5.4	9.1
Spelthorne	49.7	18.6	20.9	6.4	3.5	1.0
Surrey Heath	59.9	11.2	14.3	9.1	4.4	1.2
Woking	56.2	16.1	11.3	11.6	4.1	0.6
Average	58.0	13.1	13.0	9.8	4.5	1.5

2010	Con	Lib Dem	Lab	UKIP	Others
East Surrey	56.7	25.9	9.0	6.9	1.5
Epsom and Ewell	56.2	26.8	11.9	4.6	0.5
Esher and Walton	58.9	24.8	10.7	3.3	2.3
Guildford	53.3	39.3	5.1	1.8	0.5
Mole Valley	57.5	28.7	7.0	5.1	1.6
Reigate	53.4	26.2	11.3	4.2	5.4
Runnymede and Weybridge	55.9	21.6	13.4	6.5	2.5
South West Surrey	58.7	30.2	6.0	2.6	2.6
Spelthorne	47.1	25.9	16.5	8.5	2.2
Surrey Heath	57.6	25.8	10.2	6.3	–
Woking	50.3	37.4	8.0	3.8	0.5
Average	55.1	28.4	9.9	4.9	1.8

=== Maps ===
==== 1885–1910 ====
1885

1886

1892

1895

1900

1906

Jan 1910

Dec 1910

==== 1918–1945 ====
1918

1922

1923

1924

1929

1931

1935

1945

==== 1950–1970 ====
1950

1951

1955

1959

1964

1966

1970

==== 1974–2019 ====
Feb 1974

Oct 1974

1979

1983

1987

1992

1997

2001

2005

2010

2015

2017

2019

==== 2024-present (including constituencies partly in Berkshire and Hampshire) ====
2024

== Historical representation by party ==
A cell marked → (with a different colour background to the preceding cell) indicates that the previous MP continued to sit under a new party name.

=== 1885 to 1918 ===
Conservative Liberal Liberal Unionist National Party

Constituency	1885	86	1886	92	1892	95	1895	97	99	1900	03	04	1906	07	09	Jan 1910	Dec 1910	12	16	17
Chertsey	Hankey			Combe				Leigh-Bennett			Fyler	Bingham	Marnham			Macmaster				
Croydon	Grantham	Herbert				Ritchie							Arnold-Forster		Hermon-Hodge		Malcolm			
Epsom	Cubitt				Bucknill				W. Keswick									H. Keswick		
Guildford	Brodrick												Cowan			Horne				
Kingston upon Thames	Ellis				Temple		Skewes-Cox						Cave							
Reigate	Lawrence				Cubitt								Brodie			Rawson				→
Wimbledon	Bonsor									Hambro				Chaplin					Coats	

Note the 15 other seats of Surrey created in 1885 which primarily or wholly lay in the 1889-created County of London are not included in this list.

=== 1918 to 1950 (12, then 14 MPs) ===
Conservative Independent Conservative Labour

Constituency	1918	19	22	1922	23	1923	1924	28	1929	31	1931	32	1935	37	40	1945	47	48
Chertsey	Macmaster		Richardson								Boyd-Carpenter			Marsden				
Croydon North†	Borwick			Mason											Willink			Harris
Croydon South†	Malcolm	Smith				Mitchell-Thomson						Williams				Rees-Williams		
Epsom	Blades							Southby									McCorquodale	
Farnham	Samuel													Nicholson				
Guildford	Horne			Buckingham						Rhys			Jarvis					
Kingston upon Thames†	Campbell			Penny										Royds		Boyd-Carpenter		
Mitcham†	Worsfold				Chuter Ede	Meller									Robertson	Braddock		
Reigate	Cockerill										Touche							
Richmond (Surrey)†	Edgar			Becker		→	Moore					Ray		Harvie-Watt				
Surrey East†	Coats			Galbraith									Emmott			Astor		
Wimbledon†	Hood						Power									Palmer		
Carshalton†																Head		
Sutton and Cheam†																Marshall		

† denotes seat which falls wholly or largely within present-day county of Greater London.

=== 1950 to 1974 (19, then 20 MPs) ===
Conservative

Constituency	1950	1951	54	1955	1959	60	1964	1966	1970	72
Carshalton†	Head					Elliot				
Chertsey	Heald								Grylls	
Croydon East / Croydon NE (from 1955)†	Williams		Hughes-Hallett				Weatherill			
Croydon North / Croydon NW (from 1955)†	Harris								Taylor	
Croydon West / Croydon S (from 1955)†	Thompson							Winnick	Thompson	
Dorking	Touche						Sinclair			
Epsom	McCorquodale			Rawlinson						
Esher	Robson-Brown								Mather	
Farnham	Nicholson							Macmillan		
Guildford	Nugent							Howell		
Kingston upon Thames†	Boyd-Carpenter									
Merton and Morden†	Ryder			Atkins					Fookes	
Mitcham†	Carr									
Reigate	Vaughan-Morgan								Howe	
Richmond (Surrey)†	Harvie-Watt				Royle					
Surrey East†	Astor	Doughty							Clark	
Sutton and Cheam†	Marshall		Sharples							Tope
Wimbledon†	Black								Havers	
Woking	Watkinson						Onslow			
Surbiton†				Fisher						
Constituency	1950	1951	54	1955	1959	60	1964	1966	1970	72

† denotes seat which falls wholly or largely within present-day county of Greater London

=== 1974 to 1997 (11 MPs) ===
In 1965 half (ten) of Surrey's constituencies were moved to the new county of Greater London, but constituencies based on the old boundaries continued to be used until 1974, when Surrey gained one constituency (Spelthorne) from the abolished administrative county of Middlesex.

Conservative Referendum Party

Constituency	Feb 1974	Oct 1974	78	1979	1983	84	1987	1992	97
Chertsey & Walton	Pattie								
Dorking (1974–83) / Mole Valley (1983–)	Sinclair			Wickenden	Baker				
Epsom and Ewell	Rawlinson		Hamilton						
Esher	Mather						Taylor		
Farnham (1974–83) / SW Surrey (1983–)	Macmillan					Bottomley			
Guildford	Howell								
Reigate	Gardiner								→
Spelthorne	Atkins						Wilshire		
Surrey East	Howe							Ainsworth	
Surrey NW	Grylls								
Woking	Onslow								

=== 1997 to present (11, then 12 MPs) ===
Liberal Democrat MP Sue Doughty, who won Guildford in 2001 with a winning margin of 1.2%, was the first candidate to take a seat from the Conservatives in any part of the area covered by the present county of Surrey in 56 years.

Conservative Independent Liberal Democrats

Constituency	1997	2001	2005	2010	2015	2017	19	2019	23	2024
East Surrey	Ainsworth			Gyimah			→	Coutinho		Coutinho
Epsom and Ewell	Hamilton	Grayling								Maguire
Esher and Walton	Taylor			Raab						Harding
Guildford	St Aubyn	Doughty	Milton				→	Richardson		Franklin
Mole Valley / Dorking and Horley ('24)	Beresford									Coghlan
Reigate	Blunt								→	Paul
Runnymede & Weybridge	Hammond						→	Spencer		
SW Surrey / Farnham & Bordon ('24)^{1}	Bottomley		Hunt							Stafford
Spelthorne	Wilshire			Kwarteng						Jopp
Surrey Heath	Hawkins		Gove							Pinkerton
Woking	Malins			Lord						Forster
Godalming and Ash										Hunt

^{1}contains some parts of Hampshire

== See also ==
- Parliamentary constituencies in South East England
