= Electoral history of Michael Gove =

List of elections featuring Michael Gove as a candidate

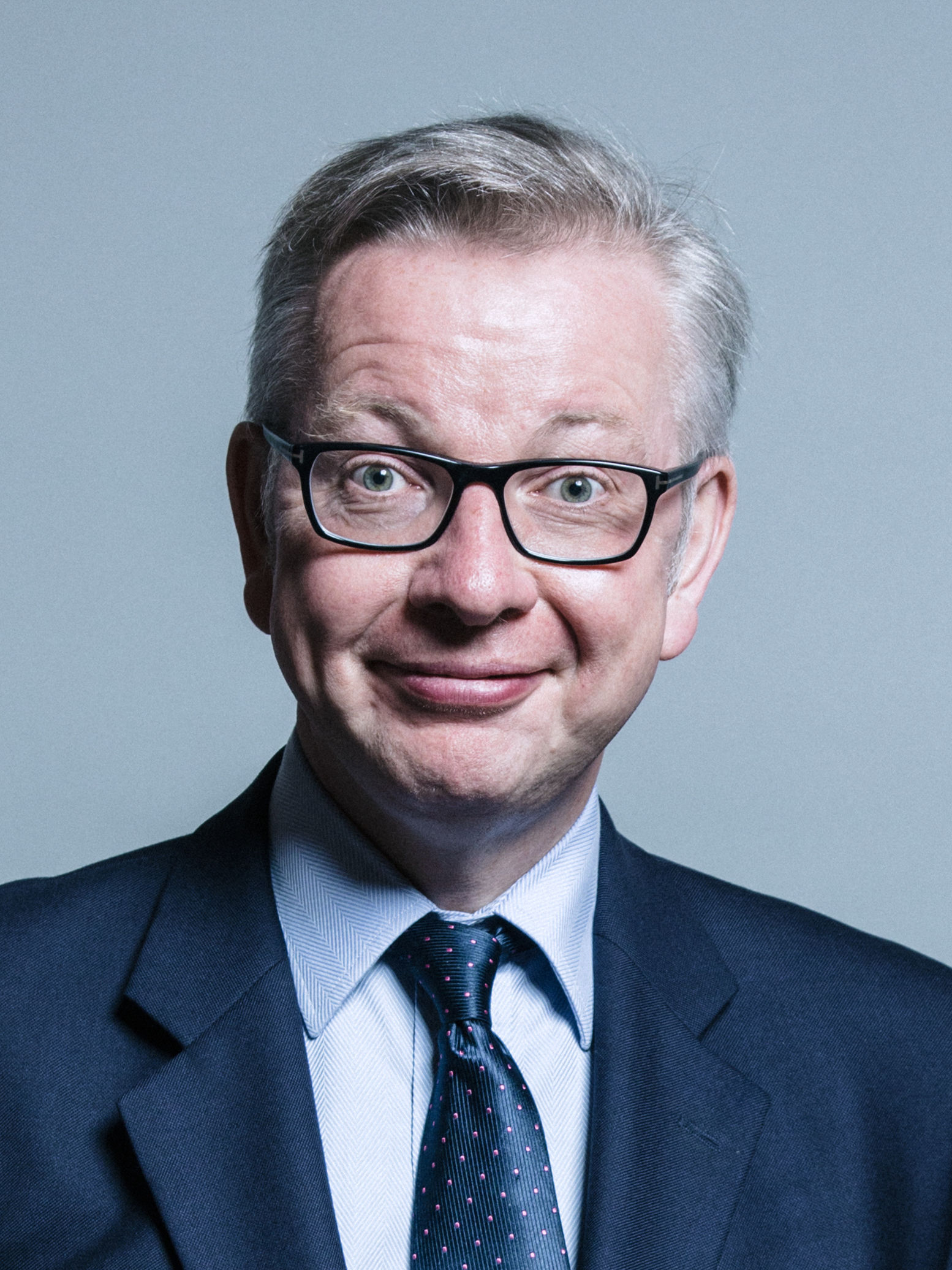
Official portrait, 2017

This is a summary of the electoral history of Michael Gove, who was a prominent Conservative Party politician who served as a Cabinet minister under David Cameron, Theresa May, Boris Johnson and Rishi Sunak, and was a Member of Parliament from 2005 to 2024.

== Parliamentary elections ==
=== 2005 general election ===
2005 general election: Surrey Heath
Party	Candidate	Votes	%	±%
Conservative	Michael Gove	24,642	51.5	+1.8
Liberal Democrats	Rosalyn Harper	13,797	28.8	+3.1
Labour	Chris Lowe	7,989	16.7	–4.7
UKIP	Steve Smith	1,430	3.0	–0.3
Majority		10,845	22.7	–1.3
Turnout		47,858	62.9	+3.4
Conservative hold		Swing	–0.7	

=== 2010 general election ===
2010 general election: Surrey Heath
Party	Candidate	Votes	%	±%
Conservative	Michael Gove	31,326	57.6	+6.1
Liberal Democrats	Alan Hilliar	14,037	25.8	–3.0
Labour	Matt Willey	5,552	10.2	–6.5
UKIP	Mark Stroud	3,432	6.3	+3.3
Majority		17,289	31.8	+9.1
Turnout		54,347	70.0	+7.1
Conservative hold		Swing	+4.5	

=== 2015 general election ===
2015 general election: Surrey Heath
Party	Candidate	Votes	%	±%
Conservative	Michael Gove	32,582	59.9	+2.3
UKIP	Paul Chapman	7,778	14.3	+8.0
Labour	Laween Atroshi	6,100	11.2	+1.0
Liberal Democrats	Ann-Marie Barker	4,937	9.1	–16.8
Green	Kimberley Lawson	2,400	4.4	New
Christian	Juliana Brimicombe	361	0.7	New
Independent	Bob and Roberta Smith	273	0.5	New
Majority		24,804	45.6	+13.8
Turnout		54,431	68.5	–1.5
Conservative hold		Swing		

=== 2017 general election ===
2017 general election: Surrey Heath
Party	Candidate	Votes	%	±%
Conservative	Michael Gove	37,118	64.2	+4.3
Labour	Laween Atroshi	12,175	21.1	+9.9
Liberal Democrats	Ann-Marie Barker	6,271	10.8	+1.7
Green	Sharon Galliford	2,258	3.9	–0.5
Majority		24,943	43.1	–2.5
Turnout		57,822	71.6	+3.1
Conservative hold		Swing	–2.8	

=== 2019 general election ===
2019 general election: Surrey Heath
Party	Candidate	Votes	%	±%
Conservative	Michael Gove	34,358	58.6	–5.6
Liberal Democrats	Alasdair Pinkerton	16,009	27.3	+16.5
Labour	Brahma Mohanty	5,407	9.2	–11.9
Green	Sharon Galliford	2,252	3.8	–0.1
UKIP	David Roe	628	1.1	New
Majority		18,349	31.3	–11.8
Turnout		58,654	72.1	+0.5
Conservative hold		Swing	–11.0	

== Conservative Party leadership elections ==
=== 2016 leadership election ===
Candidate	First ballot: 5 July 2016		Second ballot: 7 July 2016		Members' vote (Cancelled)	
Candidate	Votes	%	Votes	%	Votes	%
Theresa May	165	50.2	199	60.5	Unopposed	
Andrea Leadsom	66	20.1	84	25.5	Withdrew	
Michael Gove	48	14.6	46	14.0	Eliminated	
Stephen Crabb	34	10.3	Withdrew, endorsed May			
Liam Fox	16	4.9	Eliminated, endorsed May			
Turnout	329	99.7	329	99.7	—	
Theresa May unopposed

=== 2019 leadership election ===
Candidate	First ballot: 13 June 2019		Second ballot: 18 June 2019			Third ballot: 19 June 2019			Fourth ballot: 20 June 2019			Fifth ballot: 20 June 2019			Members' vote: 6-22 July 2019		
Candidate	Votes	%	Votes	±	%	Votes	±	%	Votes	±	%	Votes	±	%	Votes	%	% Votes Cast
Boris Johnson	114	36.4	126	▲12	40.3	143	▲17	45.7	157	▲14	50.2	160	▲3	51.1	92,153	57.8	66.4
Jeremy Hunt	43	13.7	46	▲3	14.7	54	▲8	17.3	59	▲5	18.8	77	▲18	24.6	46,656	29.3	33.6
Michael Gove	37	11.8	41	▲4	13.1	51	▲10	16.3	61	▲10	19.5	75	▲14	24.0	Eliminated		
Sajid Javid	23	7.3	33	▲10	10.5	38	▲5	12.1	34	▼4	10.9	Eliminated					
Rory Stewart	19	6.1	37	▲18	11.8	27	▼10	8.6	Eliminated								
Dominic Raab	27	8.6	30	▲3	9.6	Eliminated											
Matt Hancock	20	6.4	Withdrew														
Andrea Leadsom	11	3.5	Eliminated														
Mark Harper	10	3.2	Eliminated														
Esther McVey	9	2.9	Eliminated														
Votes cast (Note: Due to rounding errors the sum of percentages may deviate.)	313	100.0	313	Steady	100.0	313	Steady	100.0	313	Steady	100.0	313	Steady	100.0	139,318	87.4	100
Spoilt ballots	0	0.0	0	Steady	0.0	0	Steady	0.0	2	▲2	0.6	1	▼1	0.3	509	0.3	
Abstentions	0	0	0	Steady	0	0	Steady	0	0	Steady	0	0	Steady	0	20,085	12.6	
Registered Voters	313	100.0	313	Steady	100.0	313	Steady	100.0	313	Steady	100.0	313	Steady	100.0	159,403	100.0	
