= 2021 Mole Valley District Council election =

English local election

Map showing the results of the 2021 Mole Valley District Council election

The 2021 Mole Valley District Council election took place on 6 May 2021 to elect one-third of members to Mole Valley District Council in England. This Mole Valley local election had been postponed from 2020 because of the coronavirus pandemic, so it took place instead alongside the scheduled 2021 Surrey County Council election and all the other local elections across the United Kingdom. The 2021 election results are compared (in terms of percentage points gained or lost) against the results when these wards were last contested five years previously, in 2016.

== Results summary ==
2021 Mole Valley District Council election
Party	This election			Full council			This election		
Party	Seats	Net	Seats %	Other	Total	Total %	Votes	Votes %	+/−
Liberal Democrats	5	Steady	38.5	17	22	53.7	8,456	36.9	-13.5
Conservative	5	Steady	38.5	7	12	29.3	8,749	38.1	+13.6
Independent	0	Steady	0.0	4	4	9.8	0	0.0	-1.2
Ashtead Independent	3	Steady	23.1	0	3	7.3	2,883	12.6	+6.0
Green	0	Steady	0.0	0	0	0.0	1,413	6.2	-1.9
Labour	0	Steady	0.0	0	0	0.0	1,364	5.9	+2.0
Reform UK	0	Steady	0.0	0	0	0.0	69	0.3	N/A
SDP	0	Steady	0.0	0	0	0.0	8	<0.1	-0.2

== Ward results ==
=== Ashtead Common ===
Ashtead Common
Party	Candidate	Votes	%	±%
Ashtead Independent	David Hawksworth	872	63.3	-3.1
Conservative	Gavin Newton	262	19.0	−0.5
Liberal Democrats	Colette Hart	125	9.1	N/A
Labour	Julie Mottershead	118	8.6	+0.8
Majority		610	44.3	
Turnout		1,377	43.1	
Ashtead Independent hold		Swing		

=== Ashtead Park ===
Ashtead Park
Party	Candidate	Votes	%	±%
Ashtead Independent	David Harper	796	54.7	-8.5
Conservative	Linda St. John	404	27.7	+0.3
Liberal Democrats	Jon Brewer	110	7.6	N/A
Green	Richard Essex	79	5.4	+2.2
Labour	Stephen Eagle	67	4.6	−1.6
Majority		392	27.0	
Turnout		1,456	42.3	
Ashtead Independent hold		Swing		

=== Ashtead Village ===
Ashtead Village
Party	Candidate	Votes	%	±%
Ashtead Independent	Mary Cooper	1,215	58.7	-1.3
Conservative	Marion Bridgen	441	21.3	−9.8
Liberal Democrats	Phillipa Shimmin	167	8.1	N/A
Labour	Sharon Quinn	143	6.9	+1.3
Green	Jennifer Smith	105	5.1	+1.8
Majority		774	37.4	
Turnout		2,071	44.1	
Ashtead Independent hold		Swing		

=== Bookham North ===
Bookham North
Party	Candidate	Votes	%	±%
Conservative	Sarah Chambers	1,148	49.5	+2.7
Liberal Democrats	Monica Weller	935	40.3	+9.8
Green	John Roche	126	5.4	−3.9
Labour Co-op	Laurence Nasskau	68	2.9	N/A
Reform UK	Terry Moody	43	1.9	N/A
Majority		213	9.2	
Turnout		2,320	49.2	
Conservative hold		Swing		

=== Bookham South ===
Bookham South
Party	Candidate	Votes	%	±%
Conservative	James Chambers	1,117	47.0	−1.1
Liberal Democrats	Andrew Matthews	1,039	43.7	+8.3
Green	Molly Crook	119	5.0	−1.4
Labour	Helen Bates	74	3.1	N/A
Reform UK	Dorit Moody	26	1.0	N/A
Majority		78	3.3	
Turnout		2,375	52.6	
Conservative hold		Swing		

=== Dorking North ===
Dorking North
Party	Candidate	Votes	%	±%
Liberal Democrats	Chris Coghlan	938	59.6	+0.9
Conservative	Michael Hebberd	330	21.0	+1.3
Green	Susan McGrath	201	12.8	+2.3
Labour	Samuel Cockle-Hearne	106	6.7	+0.2
Majority		608	38.6	
Turnout		1,575	46.2	
Liberal Democrats hold		Swing		

=== Dorking South ===
Dorking South
Party	Candidate	Votes	%	±%
Liberal Democrats	Nick Wright	1,452	55.9	+10.5
Conservative	Roger Jones	658	25.3	−7.5
Green	Lucy Barford	299	11.5	+4.3
Labour Co-op	Kev Stroud	189	7.3	−2.5
Majority		794	30.6	
Turnout		2,598		
Liberal Democrats hold		Swing		

=== Fetcham East ===
Fetcham East
Party	Candidate	Votes	%	±%
Conservative	Lynne Brooks	880	60.6	+1.9
Liberal Democrats	Christine Miller	370	25.5	+8.0
Green	Tracey Harwood	144	9.9	+2.8
Labour	Kiy Coote	57	3.9	N/A
Majority		510	35.1	
Turnout		1,451	47.0	
Conservative hold		Swing		

=== Fetcham West ===
Fetcham West
Party	Candidate	Votes	%	±%
Liberal Democrats	Paul Kennedy	920	58.2	±0.0
Conservative	Peter Crooks	622	39.3	+9.8
Labour	Mark Coote	39	2.5	−1.4
Majority		298	18.9	
Turnout		1,581	49.6	
Liberal Democrats hold		Swing		

=== Holmwoods ===
Holmwoods
Party	Candidate	Votes	%	±%
Liberal Democrats	Rosemary Hobbs	906	50.6	+5.7
Conservative	Leslie Maruziva	663	37.0	+8.3
Green	Lisa Scott	116	6.5	−0.1
Labour	Christine Foster	105	5.9	−0.7
Majority		243	13.6	
Turnout		1,790	38.0	
Liberal Democrats hold		Swing		

=== Leatherhead North ===
Leatherhead North
Party	Candidate	Votes	%	±%
Liberal Democrats	Bridget Kendrick	886	47.1	+13.7
Conservative	Paul Purcell	781	41.5	+12.8
Labour Co-op	Frank Pemberton	214	11.4	−4.7
Majority		105	5.6	
Turnout		1,881	34.4	
Liberal Democrats hold		Swing		

=== Leatherhead South ===
Leatherhead South
Party	Candidate	Votes	%	±%
Conservative	Simon Moss	877	56.5	+0.1
Liberal Democrats	Gareth Parsons	389	25.1	+1.0
Labour Co-op	Ann Clark	148	9.5	N/A
Green	Tor Bailey	137	8.8	+0.3
Majority		488	31.4	
Turnout		1,551	44.9	
Conservative hold		Swing		

=== Westcott ===
Westcott
Party	Candidate	Votes	%	±%
Conservative	James Friend	566	61.8	−4.6
Liberal Democrats	Abhiram Magesh	219	23.9	+5.6
Green	Julian Everett	87	9.5	+4.9
Labour Co-op	James Stringer	36	3.9	−0.2
SDP	Stuart Hunt	8	0.9	N/A
Majority		347	37.9	
Turnout		916	50.9	
Conservative hold		Swing	▼5.1	
