= Paul Beresford =

British–New Zealander politician (born 1946)

Sir Paul Beresford
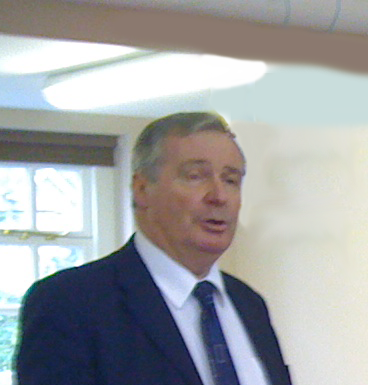

Chair of the Administration Committee
- In office 21 July 2015 – 6 November 2019
- Preceded by: Alan Haselhurst
- Succeeded by: Charles Walker

Member of Parliament for Mole Valley
- In office 1 May 1997 – 30 May 2024
- Preceded by: Kenneth Baker
- Succeeded by: Chris Coghlan (Dorking and Horley (Note: The Mole Valley constituency was renamed Dorking and Horley at the 2024 general election, with major boundary changes))

Parliamentary Under-Secretary of State for Environment
- In office 20 May 1994 – 2 May 1997
- Prime Minister: John Major
- Preceded by: Arthur Gore, 9th Earl of Arran
- Succeeded by: Angela Eagle

Member of Parliament for Croydon Central
- In office 9 April 1992 – 8 April 1997
- Preceded by: John Moore
- Succeeded by: Geraint Davies

Leader of Wandsworth Council
- In office 1983–1992
- Preceded by: Christopher Chope
- Succeeded by: Edward Lister

Personal details
- Born: Alexander Paul Beresford; 6 April 1946 (age 80) Levin, New Zealand
- Party: Conservative
- Spouse: Julie Beresford (2nd wife)
- Children: 4
- Education: Waimea College
- Alma mater: University of Otago

Sir Alexander Paul Beresford (born 6 April 1946) is a British–New Zealander politician who served as the Conservative Member of Parliament (MP) for Mole Valley in Surrey from 1997 to 2024. He previously served as MP for Croydon Central from 1992 to 1997.

== Early life and career ==
Alexander Beresford was born on 6 April 1946 in Levin in the Horowhenua District of Manawatū-Whanganui, New Zealand. He moved to Nelson as a child, where he lived in Richmond, and attended Waimea College in Richmond before attending the University of Otago in Dunedin. Beresford holds dual British and New Zealand citizenship.

Beresford was elected as a Councillor to Wandsworth Borough Council in 1978, and was its Leader between 1983 and 1992, through much of the Thatcher Government. He was knighted in the 1990 New Year Honours for political and public service.

In addition to his parliamentary career, Beresford is a practising dentist, operating his own private dental practice – The Beresford Clinic – in Putney, South West London. The practice received adverse publicity following a critical CQC inspection in 2021.

== Parliamentary career ==
Beresford was selected to fight the safe Conservative seat of Croydon Central following the retirement of former Cabinet minister John Moore. Beresford was elected at the 1992 general election with 55.4% of the vote and a majority of 9,650. He made his maiden speech on 30 June 1992.

Beresford entered the Major Government in 1994 as the parliamentary under-secretary of state at the Department for the Environment and remained until the Government was defeated in 1997.

When the number of seats in Croydon was reduced from four to three before the 1997 general election, Beresford failed to be selected for the newly drawn Croydon Central, and instead fought the safe Conservative Mole Valley seat in Surrey, where Kenneth Baker was retiring. At the 1997 general election, Beresford was elected with 48% of the vote and a majority of 10,221.

Beresford was re-elected at the 2001 general election with an increased vote share of 50.5% and a decreased majority of 10,153. He was again re-elected at the 2005 general election with an increased vote share of 54.8% and an increased majority of 11,997.

In 2004 Beresford was asked to attend a meeting with Nigel Farage where Farage is said to have asked to be nominated for a safe a Conservative seat. Farage claims he was approached and offered the safe seat (Tunbridge Wells).

Before the 2010 general election, Beresford was a member of the Communities & Local Government Select committee. At the 2010 general election, Beresford was again re-elected with an increased vote share of 57.5% and an increased majority of 15,653. In 2012, Beresford was named by the Conservative Home website as one of a minority of loyal Conservative backbench MPs not to have voted against the government in any significant rebellions.

Beresford, while serving as a backbencher, has been successful in utilising Private Members Bills and carefully chosen amendments to government legislation to achieve over ten legal changes which the BBC's Mark D'Arcy described as collectively having '...a significant impact'. These primarily but not exclusively focused on child protection, an issue Beresford has campaigned on for decades.

At the 2015 general election, Beresford was again re-elected with an increased vote share of 60.6% and an increased majority of 25,453.

He campaigned for a Remain vote during the 2016 referendum on EU membership.

At the snap 2017 general election Beresford was again re-elected with an increased vote share of 61.9% and a decreased majority of 24,137. He was again re-elected at the 2019 general election with a decreased vote share of 55.4% and a decreased majority of 12,041.

In 2021 Beresford introduced a further Private Members Bill – the Local Government (Disqualification) Bill – intended to prevent individuals who have been given non custodial sentences for sexual offences from sitting as local councillors or mayors. This Bill received the backing of the government and completed successful passage through the Commons in January 2022. It subsequently passed through the House of Lords and received Royal Assent in April 2022.

In July 2022, during the political crisis caused by the Pincher Scandal, Beresford announced that he had lost confidence in Prime Minister Boris Johnson and felt he should resign. Beresford went on to back Rishi Sunak in both the first and second Conservative Party leadership contests of 2022.

Beresford announced in early 2023 that he would step down at the 2024 general election.

== Expenses ==
During the media coverage of the United Kingdom parliamentary expenses scandal, it was revealed that Beresford, who is a practising dentist, designated his west London property (which includes his dental surgery) as his second home, allowing him to claim allowances of three-quarters of the running costs of the property from the taxpayer.

== Personal life ==
Beresford has a son from his previous marriage who lives in New Zealand. He and his wife Julie have two sons and one daughter.

== Notes ==
Parliament of the United Kingdom
Preceded by John Moore	Member of Parliament for Croydon Central; 1992–1997	Succeeded by Geraint Davies
Preceded by Kenneth Baker	Member of Parliament for Mole Valley; 1997–2024	Constituency abolished
