= Chris Coghlan (politician) =

British politician

Chris Coghlan MP
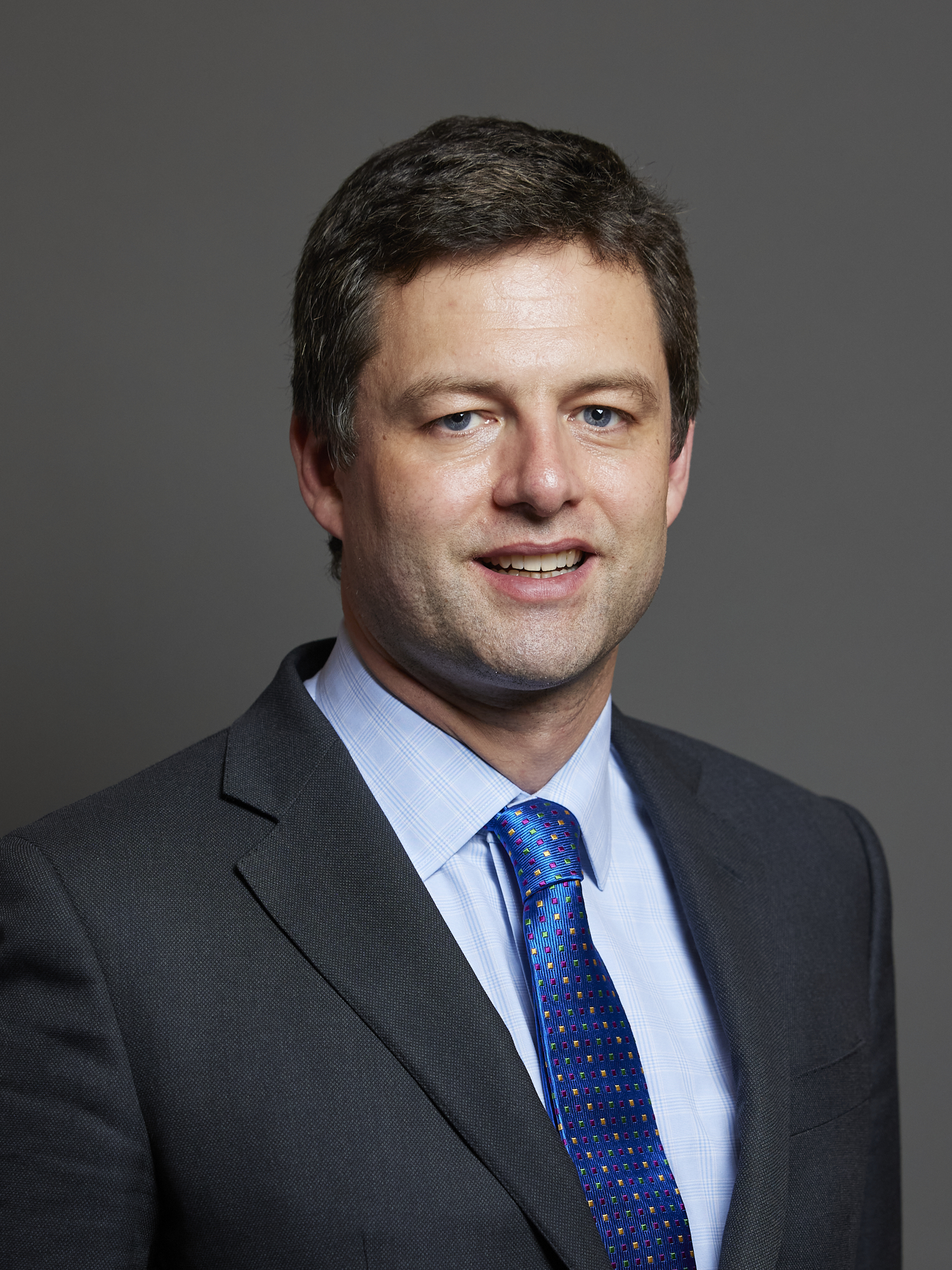
- Official portrait, 2024

Member of Parliament for Dorking and Horley
- Incumbent
- Assumed office 4 July 2024
- Preceded by: Paul Beresford (Mole Valley (Note: The Mole Valley constituency was renamed "Dorking and Horley" at the 2024 general election, with major boundary changes))
- Majority: 5,391 (10.8%)

Personal details
- Born: Christopher Austin Francis Coghlan; December 1980 (age 45)
- Party: Liberal Democrats; Renew (2018)
- Education: King's College London; London Business School; Harvard Kennedy School

Military service
- Allegiance: United Kingdom
- Branch/service: British Army (Reserve)
- Years of service: 2008 – 2013; 2017 – 2022; 2025 – present
- Rank: Captain

Christopher Austin Francis Coghlan (born December 1980) is a British Liberal Democrat politician who has been Member of Parliament (MP) for Dorking and Horley since 2024. He previously co-founded the Renew Party in 2018.

== Early life and education ==
Coghlan was born in December 1980. He grew up in Peaslake, a village near Guildford, Surrey. He graduated from King's College London in 2001, later completing a master's degree in finance at London Business School in 2012 and gaining a Master of Public Administration degree at Harvard Kennedy School in 2014.

Coghlan first served in the Territorial Army from 2008 to 2013. He was commissioned in the now-named Army Reserve as a second lieutenant (on probation) on 23 February 2017. In October 2018, he was promoted to the rank of captain, back dated to the day of his commission. He was mobilised to serve in Iraq as a military advisor in 2020. He left the reserves in 2022, before rejoining in 2025 to serve with the London Guards.

He was a Foreign and Commonwealth Office anti-terrorism officer, but resigned because he was "demoralised by the failure of our politicians to deliver opportunity in government, fight Corbyn and a hard Brexit".

== Political career ==
Coghlan stood as an independent anti-Brexit candidate in Battersea in the 2017 general election. In 2018, he co-founded the Renew Party, a minor centrist political party that stood for "a second referendum and a tech revolution to leave no one behind". He left the party later that year after disagreements with other senior members.

Coghlan was elected to Mole Valley District Council for the ward of Dorking North in the 2021 council election as a Liberal Democrat.

In the 2024 general election, Coghlan was elected as the Liberal Democrat MP for the new seat of Dorking and Horley with 41.9 per cent of the vote and a majority of 5,391.

== Personal life ==
Coghlan lives in Dorking with his wife Clara and their three daughters. Coghlan is a Roman Catholic. He was barred from receiving Holy Communion due to his support for the Terminally Ill Adults (End of Life) Bill.

== Notes ==
Parliament of the United Kingdom
New constituency	Member of Parliament for Dorking and Horley; 2024–present	Incumbent
