= Touche baronets =

Baronetcy in the Baronetage of the United Kingdom

There have been baronetcies created for members of the Touche family from Surrey, both in the Baronetage of the United Kingdom. Both creations are extant as of 2010.

The Touche Baronetcy, of Westcott in the County of Surrey, was created in the Baronetage of the United Kingdom on 5 July 1920 for the accountant and Conservative politician George Touche. The third Baronet was Deputy Chairman of National Westminster Bank between 1977 and 1987.

The Touche Baronetcy, of Dorking in the County of Surrey, was created in the Baronetage of the United Kingdom on 3 July 1962 for the Conservative politician Gordon Touche. He was Chairman of Ways and Means between 1960 and 1962. Touche was the third son of the first Baronet of the 1920 creation. As of 2017 the title is held by his grandson, the third Baronet, who succeeded in 2017.

== Touche baronets, of Westcott (1920) ==
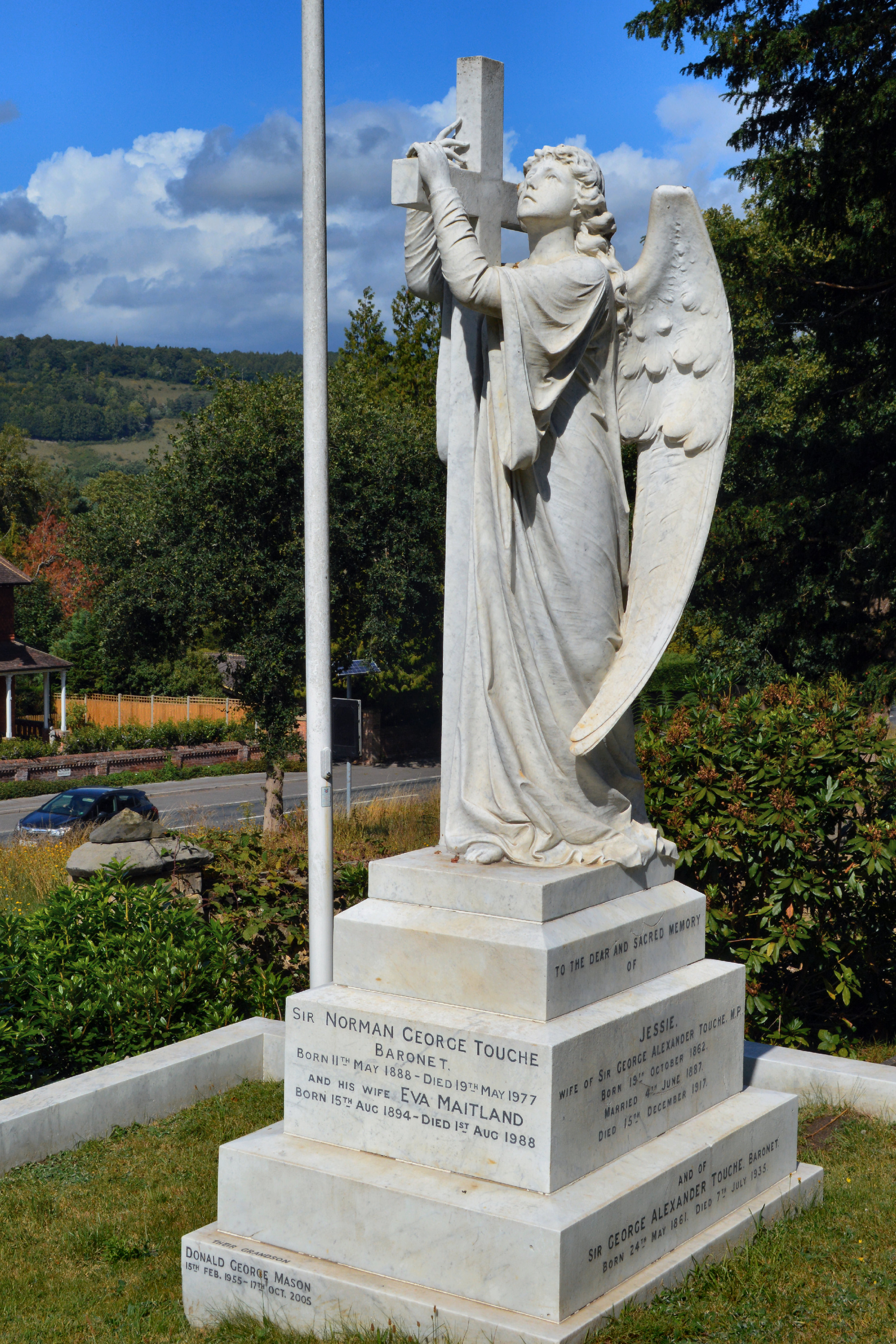
- Westcott, Holy Trinity Church, tomb of Sir Norman Touche
  Sir George Alexander Touche, 1st Baronet (1861–1935)
- Sir Norman George Touche, 2nd Baronet (1888–1977)
- Sir Anthony George Touche, 3rd Baronet (1927–2018)
- Sir William George Touche, 4th Baronet (born 1962)

The heir apparent is the present holder's son Harry George Touche (born 1992).

== Touche baronets, of Dorking (1962) ==
- Sir Gordon Cosmo Touche, 1st Baronet (1895–1972)
- Sir Rodney Gordon Touche, 2nd Baronet (1928–2017)
- Sir Eric MacLellan Touche, 3rd Baronet (born 1960)

The heir apparent is Braden Stringer Touche (born 1990), only son of the 3rd Baronet.

Coat of arms of Touche baronets

Crest
Between two fleurs-de-lis Or a Dorking cock Proper.
Escutcheon
Vert a lion rampant Argent holding between the forepaws a portcullis chained Or between two fleurs-de-lis one in sinister chief the other in dexter base Argent.
Motto
Vigilate (Be Watchful)
