= Keith Wickenden =

British Conservative politician (1932–1983)

Keith David Wickenden (22 November 1932 – 9 July 1983) was a Conservative Party politician who served as Member of Parliament for Dorking from 1979 until 1983.

== Early life ==
Keith Wickenden had an older brother named Roland, who served as chairman of European Ferries.

== Business career ==
Wickenden worked as a partner at a firm of chartered accountants. When his brother Roland died in 1972, he became chairman of European Ferries. In 1973, he became a director of Brighton & Hove Albion F.C. He also served as a director of Television South.

During his time as chairman of European Ferries, the company made a counterbid against the UK government on the Port of Felixstowe.

In 1980, Wickenden announced his intention to purchase Sealink, the major competitor of European Ferries, from British Rail. In the same year, he also took over the merchant bank Singer and Friedlander.

== Political career ==
In 1979, he became Member of Parliament for Dorking as a member of the Conservative Party. He was elected with 61.4% of the vote, with a majority of 41.8% over the Liberal Party.

The seat was abolished in 1983, and he declined running for election in the Mole Valley seat which nearly replicated Dorking, due to a lung disorder.

== Personal life ==
Wickenden was married and had four sons. He was an experienced pilot, and often flew his own Spitfire to engagements.

On 9 July 1983, Wickenden died in a plane crash. Moments after taking off from Shoreham Airport in West Sussex, his twin engine de Havilland Dove plunged into a bank of the River Adur before catching on fire. An inquest into his death found the plane's engine to be at fault: instead of paying £10,000 for an engine replacement, Wickenden had paid £650 for a 1949-built engine which had been in storage for eight years before being fitted to the Dove.

Parliament of the United Kingdom
| Preceded by Sir George Sinclair | Member of Parliament for Dorking; 1979–1983 | Constituency abolished |
