= Gordon Touche =

British politician

The Right Honourable Sir Gordon Touche Bt

Deputy Speaker of the House of Commons Chairman of Ways and Means
- In office 29 October 1959 – 30 January 1962
- Speaker: Harry Hylton-Foster
- Preceded by: Charles MacAndrew
- Succeeded by: William Anstruther-Gray

Deputy Chairman of Ways and Means
- In office 27 November 1956 – 29 October 1959
- Speaker: William Morrison
- Preceded by: Rhys Hopkin Morris
- Succeeded by: William Anstruther-Gray

Member of Parliament for Dorking Reigate (1931–50)
- In office 27 October 1931 – 15 October 1964
- Preceded by: George Cockerill
- Succeeded by: George Sinclair

Personal details
- Born: Gordon Cosmo Touch; 8 July 1895
- Died: 19 May 1972 (aged 76)
- Party: Conservative
- Parent: Sir George Touche (father)
- Education: Marlborough College
- Alma mater: University College, Oxford
- Occupation: Barrister

Sir Gordon Cosmo Touche, 1st Baronet (8 July 1895 – 19 May 1972) was a British barrister and politician who served as a Conservative Member of Parliament (MP) for more than 30 years and became Deputy Speaker of the House of Commons. However, his conduct in this role was criticised by Labour MPs on several occasions.

== Early life and career ==
Touche was the son of Sir George Touche, who founded a firm of accountants and was himself active in politics as an alderman of the City of London and Member of Parliament for Islington North from 1910 to 1918. He was sent to Marlborough College and went on from there to University College, Oxford. It was at Oxford that he first became interested in politics.

== Military service, Bar and commercial experience ==
Having stayed at Oxford until he had taken his degree, Touche was commissioned into the Army Service Corps in 1915. He fought at Gallipoli, in Palestine and in Egypt. At one point, his transport ship was sunk in the Aegean Sea. He reached the rank of Lieutenant. When the First World War ended, Touche read for the Bar and was called in 1923 by the Inner Temple. He joined the South-Eastern Circuit where he specialised in commercial cases. Also getting involved in business, he was elected a director of the British Automatic Company in 1928. Touche was a very 'clubbable' man who was prominent in London society; he served on the Executive Committee of the United Club for many years and was chairman in 1938.

== Political career ==
=== Byelection candidate ===
In 1928, Touche was chosen as Conservative candidate for the byelection in Ashton-under-Lyne. This was a high-profile campaign caused by the bankruptcy of the sitting Conservative MP in a three-way marginal constituency; Touche stressed his support for 'safeguarding' vulnerable industries with protective tariffs on foreign imports. However, he lost the seat to the Labour candidate; the news was announced to the people of Ashton-under-Lyne by the Mayor firing yellow rockets from the Town Hall (yellow being the Labour Party colour in Ashton).

At the 1929 general election, Touche was chosen for Islington North, the same constituency his father had represented as a Liberal. However, he fell to another Labour gain.

=== Elected to Parliament ===
Touche had better luck at the 1931 general election when he was chosen for Reigate in Surrey. This proved a rock-solid Conservative seat and Touche was elected with a majority of nearly 27,000. In Parliament he often took up technical tax law issues which he had dealt with in his professional work.

On foreign affairs and defence issues, Touche opposed the reform of government in India (his wife was the daughter of an Indian colonial administrator). In 1937 he joined with others including Admiral Roger Keyes and Brendan Bracken in urging rejection of the Finance Bill because of its proposal for a 'National Defence Contribution', a separate tax on the most profitable businesses to pay for rearmament. He backed Neville Chamberlain in the Norway Debate of 1940.

=== Political campaigns ===
During the Second World War, Touche was a member of the Palace of Westminster Home Guard. As the war came towards its close, Touche was a sponsor for the 'Fighting Fund for Freedom' which campaigned for minimum state control and maximum personal freedom. He voted against the American loan in December 1945, and opposed the establishment of the new town of Crawley and London Gatwick Airport in the south of his constituency. After boundary changes in 1950, he moved to Dorking constituency.

=== Deputy Speaker ===
From 1945 Touche was Chairman of the Committee of Selection responsible for picking Members for other committee service. As a senior Member, he was often delegated to take the chair in Standing Committees on Bills. He was knighted in 1952, and in November 1956 was made Deputy Chairman of Ways and Means (second Deputy Speaker). This took him out of the normal party political fray as the Deputy Speaker did not speak, although in December 1958 he was involved in a row over a defence debate. After a Conservative filibuster, Touche passed over Aneurin Bevan and called Christopher Soames to close the debate, but Bevan also insisted on speaking. Touche insisted that he had no choice, while Bevan and Labour leader Hugh Gaitskell objected; eventually the Speaker took the chair and endorsed his Deputy's actions.

=== Disputed judgments ===
Considered for the Speakership in 1959, Touche lost out to Harry Hylton-Foster but was promoted to being Chairman of Ways and Means. He was made a member of the Privy Council in 1959. There was another angry clash in the House of Commons in February 1961 when Touche was seen having a private conversation with Martin Redmayne, the Government Chief Whip; opposition MPs demanded to know what had been said, and insisted that the Speaker be sent for. Touche accepted a motion for the adjournment of the House moved by a Government whip and the House adjourned, but the next day a motion of censure was put down. Debating the motion, John Diamond said that the Government had made a "mistake in appointing a man whose abilities were not appropriate to the dimensions of the task".

Touche was reported to be considering resignation but was urged to stay by Conservative colleagues, and decided to continue. However Labour MPs resented his presence in the chair and cheered whenever he was succeeded by another deputy. In October 1961 he announced he would stand down at the next election. When, in December 1961, Touche mistakenly announced an opposition victory in a House of Commons division, a long succession of points of order forced him to adjourn the House for "grave disorder". The Speaker again backed his deputy.

== Retirement ==
In the new year of 1962, Touche decided to resign as deputy speaker and was replaced by Sir William Anstruther-Gray. Returning to the backbenches, Touche opposed the Macmillan government's application to join the European Economic Community. He was awarded a baronetcy in the 1962 Birthday Honours.

== Arms ==
Coat of arms of Gordon Touche

Crest
Between two fleurs-de-lis Or a Dorking cock Proper.
Escutcheon
Vert a lion rampant Argent holding between the forepaws a portcullis chained Or between two fleurs-de-lis one in sinister chief the other in dexter base Argent.
Motto
Vigilate (Be Watchful)

Parliament of the United Kingdom
Preceded by George Cockerill	Member of Parliament for Reigate; 1931–1950	Succeeded by Himself as MP for Dorking
Preceded by George Cockerill	Member of Parliament for Reigate; 1931–1950	Succeeded by John Vaughan-Morgan
Preceded by Himself as MP for Reigate	Member of Parliament for Dorking; 1950–1964	Succeeded by George Sinclair
Political offices
Preceded by Rhys Hopkin Morris	Deputy Chairman of Ways and Means; 1956–1959	Succeeded by William Anstruther-Gray
Preceded by Charles MacAndrew	Chairman of Ways and Means; 1959–1962	Succeeded by William Anstruther-Gray
Baronetage of the United Kingdom
New title Granted by Queen Elizabeth II	Baronet (of Dorking); 1962–1972	Succeeded by Rodney Touche
