= Surrey Heath (constituency) =

UK Parliament constituency (since 1997)

Coordinates: 51.32°N 0.68°W

- County constituency for the House of Commons
- Boundaries since 2024
- Boundary of Surrey Heath in South East England
- County: Surrey
- Electorate: 70,825 (2023)
- Borough: Surrey Heath
- Major settlements: Camberley; Lightwater; Frimley

Current constituency
- Created: 1997
- Member of Parliament: Al Pinkerton (Liberal Democrats)
- Created from: North West Surrey; Guildford; Woking

Surrey Heath is a constituency (Note: A county constituency (for the purposes of election expenses and type of returning officer)) represented in the House of Commons of the UK Parliament since 2024 by Al Pinkerton, a Liberal Democrat. The Home counties suburban constituency is in the London commuter belt, on the outskirts of Greater London. Surrey Heath is in the north west of Surrey and borders the counties of Berkshire and Hampshire.

== Constituency profile ==
High Street, Camberley

Surrey Heath is a constituency in Surrey in South East England. Its largest town is Camberley, which has a population of around 38,000. Other settlements include the town of Frimley and the villages of Mytchett, Pirbright, Bisley, West End, Lightwater, Bagshot, Windlesham and Chobham. Surrey Heath has similar boundaries to the local government district of the same name and is ultimately named after the heathland that covers parts of the constituency.

This constituency is located on the outskirts of the London commuter belt, around 26 miles (42 km) south-west of the centre of the capital. It is one of the most affluent constituencies in the country, covering suburban towns and villages with low levels of deprivation. Most of Surrey Heath was made up of sparsely-populated heathland and woodland until the early 19th century. The constituency has a strong military association; Pirbright Camp is located here and Camberley grew around the nearby Royal Military Academy Sandhurst. Nearly half of homes in the constituency are detached; the suburbs of Camberley contain many large detached properties. House prices across the constituency are considerably higher than the regional and UK averages.

Residents of Surrey Heath have a similar age profile to the rest of the country, but with a slightly below-average proportion of young adults. They have high rates of homeownership and very high levels of income. The child poverty rate is less than half the overall UK figure. Residents are generally well-educated and a high proportion work in the health, retail and science sectors. The percentage claiming unemployment benefits is low. White people made up 85% of the population at the 2021 census. Asians were the largest ethnic minority group at 8%.

Most of this constituency is represented by Liberal Democrats at the local council, with some Conservatives elected in Mytchett and Pirbright. An estimated 51% of voters in Surrey Heath supported leaving the European Union in the 2016 referendum, similar to the UK-wide figure of 52%.

== History ==
The seat was created under the Fourth Periodic Review of Westminster constituencies in 1997 from the majority of North West Surrey, a seat that was abolished, and smaller parts of Woking and Guildford, seats that remained.

On its creation, Nick Hawkins was elected to parliament as Surrey Heath's MP, after the North West Surrey MP, Michael Grylls, who had in 1992 achieved a majority of 28,392, retired. One of Hawkins' opponents for selection was future Speaker John Bercow, selected for Buckingham the same day.

In 1999 then-party chairman Michael Ancram intervened to prevent a move to deselect Hawkins following local party disquiet about him leaving his wife of 20 years for a local councillor. In 2004, the Conservative constituency association, then the richest in the country, deselected Hawkins for the next election, following accusations of racism, in the hope of obtaining an MP of cabinet calibre.

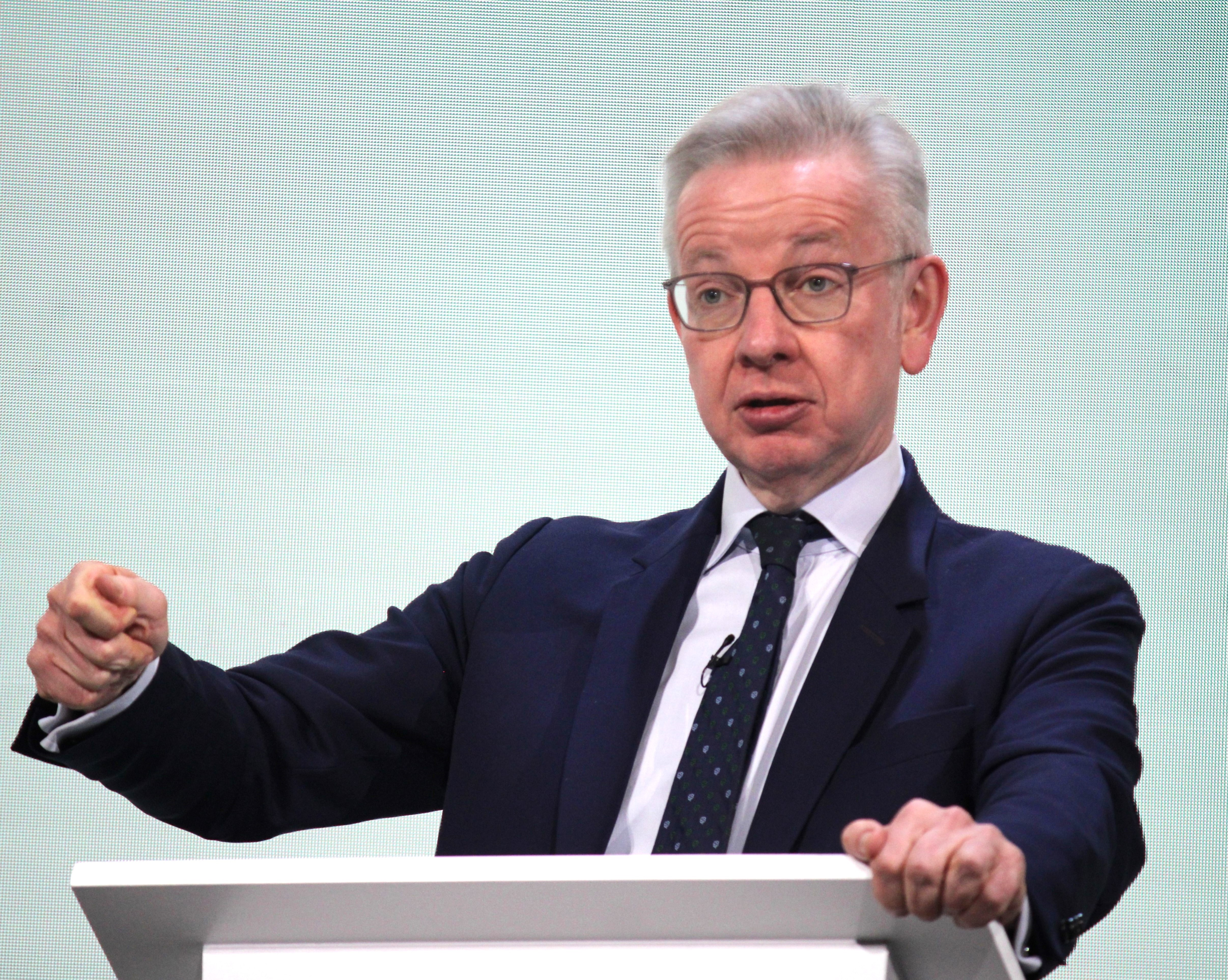
Michael Gove, MP for Surrey Heath from 2005 to 2024

Michael Gove was duly selected and became the MP at the 2005 general election. He went on to serve in various Cabinet positions under David Cameron, Theresa May, Boris Johnson and Rishi Sunak. Apart from periods as a backbencher from July 2016 to June 2017 and July to October 2022, he served continuously in the Cabinet from 2010 to 2024.

Until the 2019 general election, the constituency was generally considered to be one of the Conservative Party's safest seats. But the 2019 election saw an unexpected 11.1% swing to the Liberal Democrats' candidate Al Pinkerton, who secured the second-highest second place since the constituency's creation, with Labour recording their lowest share of the vote since the seat's creation.

After the 2024 general election was called, Gove announced he would not stand for re-election. The seat consequently fell to Al Pinkerton, standing again for the Liberal Democrats, on a further swing of 20.9%; it was one of six (out of the twelve) Surrey seats to switch from the Conservatives to the Lib Dems in that election

Prior to the 2024 General Election, Surrey Heath was numerically the Liberal Democrats' 58th target seat (before boundary changes), and in the 2023 local elections the Lib Dems had ended 49 years of continuous Conservative administration by taking overall control of Surrey Heath Council and had also helped push the Conservatives to two consecutive poor results on Guildford Borough Council in the local election years of 2019 and 2023.

== Boundaries ==
Map of 1997–2024 boundaries

=== 1997–2024 ===
Surrey Heath occupies much of the northwest corner of the county. From its inception in 1997 until 2024, it covered the Borough of Surrey Heath and the Guildford wards knows as 'The Ashes':

- Bagshot, Bisley and West End, Frimley, Frimley Green, Heatherside, Lightwater, Mytchett and Deepcut, Old Dean, Parkside, St Michaels, St Pauls, Town, Watchett, and Windlesham & Chobham in the Borough of Surrey Heath
- Ash South and Tongham, Ash Vale, and Ash Wharf in the Borough of Guildford.

=== Current ===
Further to the 2023 Periodic Review of Westminster constituencies which came into effect for the 2024 United Kingdom general election, the constituency is now composed of the following (as they existed on 1 December 2020):

- Surrey Heath Borough – all wards.
- Guildford Borough – Normandy and Pirbright. (The two wards were amalgamated into one two-member ward after the review began, so figure individually in the review and Statutory Instrument.)

The electorate was reduced to bring it within the permitted range by transferring the three substantial Guildford Borough wards which constitute Ash to a new seat, Godalming and Ash. To partly compensate, the two villages (and one-member Guildford Council wards) of Normandy and Pirbright were transferred into the Surrey Heath seat from the Woking constituency.

== Members of Parliament ==
North West Surrey, Guildford and Woking prior to 1997

Election	Member	Party
1997	Nick Hawkins	Conservative
2005	Michael Gove	Conservative
2024	Al Pinkerton	Liberal Democrats

== Elections ==
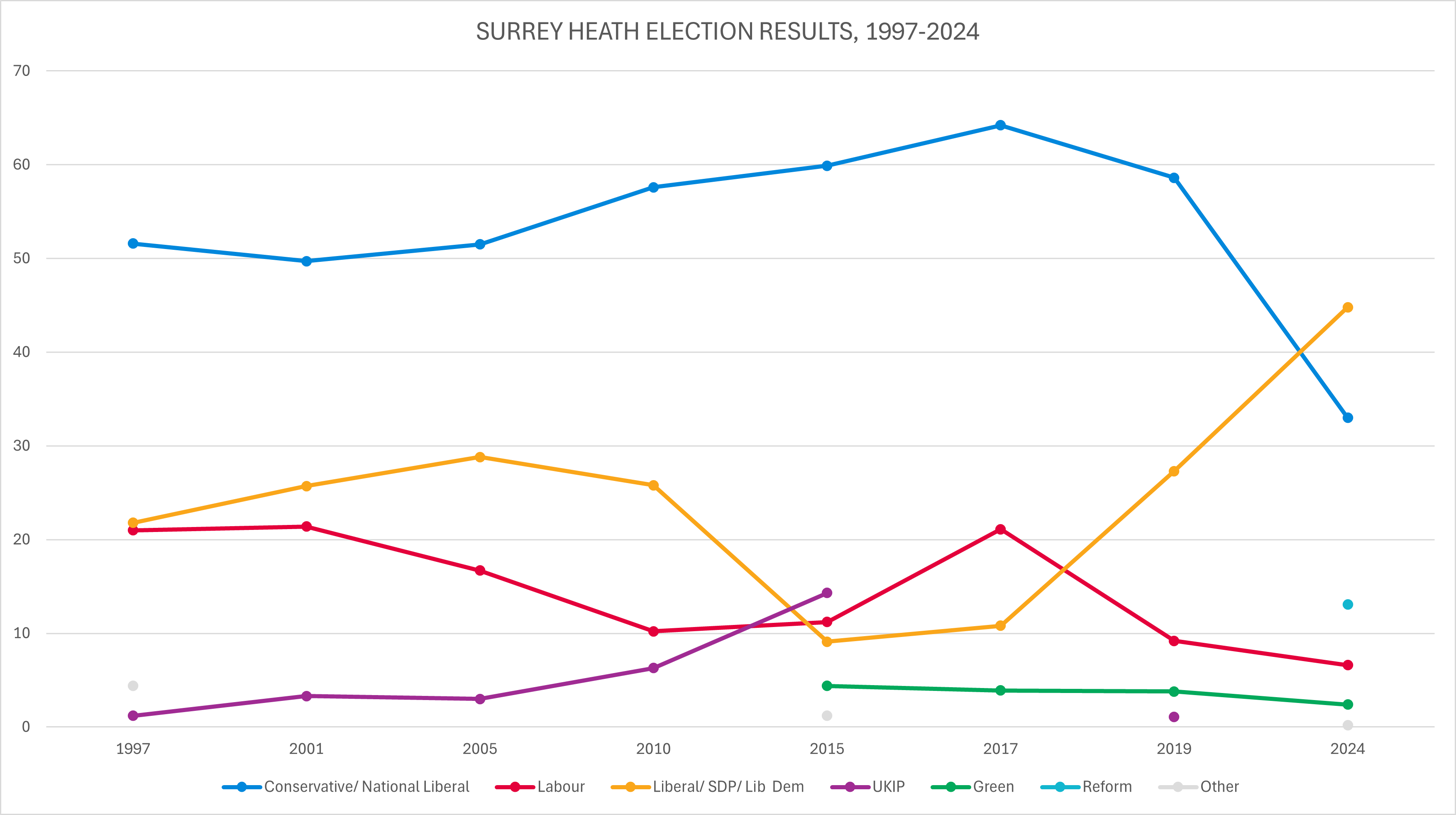
Election results 1997-2024

=== Elections in the 2020s ===
2024 general election: Surrey Heath
Party	Candidate	Votes	%	±%
Liberal Democrats	Al Pinkerton	21,387	44.8	+16.8
Conservative	Ed McGuinness	15,747	33.0	−24.9
Reform	Samantha Goggin	6,252	13.1	N/A
Labour	Jess Hammersley-Rich	3,148	6.6	−2.8
Green	Jon Campbell	1,162	2.4	−1.1
Heritage	Elizabeth Wallitt	92	0.2	N/A
Majority		5,640	11.8	N/A
Turnout		47,788	66.4	−7.0
Registered electors		71,934		
Liberal Democrats gain from Conservative		Swing	+20.9	

=== Elections in the 2010s ===
2019 notional result
Party	Vote	%
Conservative	30,161	57.9
Liberal Democrats	14,609	28.0
Labour	4,888	9.4
Green	1,845	3.5
Others	628	1.2
Turnout	52,131	73.6
Electorate	70,825	

2019 general election: Surrey Heath
Party	Candidate	Votes	%	±%
Conservative	Michael Gove	34,358	58.6	−5.6
Liberal Democrats	Al Pinkerton	16,009	27.3	+16.5
Labour	Brahma Mohanty	5,407	9.2	−11.9
Green	Sharon Galliford	2,252	3.8	−0.1
UKIP	David Roe	628	1.1	N/A
Majority		18,349	31.3	−11.8
Turnout		58,654	72.1	+0.5
Conservative hold		Swing	−11.1	

2017 general election: Surrey Heath
Party	Candidate	Votes	%	±%
Conservative	Michael Gove	37,118	64.2	+4.3
Labour	Laween Atroshi	12,175	21.1	+9.9
Liberal Democrats	Ann-Marie Barker	6,271	10.8	+1.7
Green	Sharon Galliford	2,258	3.9	−0.5
Majority		24,943	43.1	−2.5
Turnout		57,822	71.6	+3.1
Conservative hold		Swing	−2.8	

2015 general election: Surrey Heath
Party	Candidate	Votes	%	±%
Conservative	Michael Gove	32,582	59.9	+2.3
UKIP	Paul Chapman	7,778	14.3	+8.0
Labour	Laween Atroshi	6,100	11.2	+1.0
Liberal Democrats	Ann-Marie Barker	4,937	9.1	−16.8
Green	Kimberley Lawson	2,400	4.4	N/A
Christian	Juliana Brimicombe	361	0.7	N/A
Independent	Bob and Roberta Smith	273	0.5	N/A
Majority		24,804	45.6	+13.8
Turnout		54,431	68.5	−1.5
Conservative hold		Swing		

2010 general election: Surrey Heath
Party	Candidate	Votes	%	±%
Conservative	Michael Gove	31,326	57.6	+6.1
Liberal Democrats	Alan Hilliar	14,037	25.8	−3.0
Labour	Matt Willey	5,552	10.2	−6.5
UKIP	Mark Stroud	3,432	6.3	+3.3
Majority		17,289	31.8	+9.1
Turnout		54,347	70.0	+7.1
Conservative hold		Swing	+4.5	

=== Elections in the 2000s ===
2005 general election: Surrey Heath
Party	Candidate	Votes	%	±%
Conservative	Michael Gove	24,642	51.5	+1.8
Liberal Democrats	Rosalyn Harper	13,797	28.8	+3.1
Labour	Chris Lowe	7,989	16.7	−4.7
UKIP	Steve Smith	1,430	3.0	−0.3
Majority		10,845	22.7	−1.3
Turnout		47,858	62.9	+3.4
Conservative hold		Swing	−0.7	

2001 general election: Surrey Heath
Party	Candidate	Votes	%	±%
Conservative	Nick Hawkins	22,401	49.7	−1.9
Liberal Democrats	Mark Lelliott	11,582	25.7	+3.9
Labour	James Norman	9,640	21.4	+0.4
UKIP	Nigel Hunt	1,479	3.3	+2.1
Majority		10,819	24.0	−5.8
Turnout		45,102	59.5	−14.6
Conservative hold		Swing	-2.9	

=== Elections in the 1990s ===
1997 general election: Surrey Heath
Party	Candidate	Votes	%	±%
Conservative	Nick Hawkins	28,231	51.6	
Liberal Democrats	David Newman	11,944	21.8	
Labour	Susan Jones	11,511	21.0	
Referendum	John Gale	2,385	4.4	
UKIP	Richard Squire	653	1.2	
Majority		16,287	29.8	
Turnout		54,724	74.1	
Conservative win (new seat)				

== See also ==
- Parliamentary constituencies in Surrey
- List of parliamentary constituencies in the South East England (region)

== Sources ==
- Election result, 2010 (BBC)
- Election result, 2005 (BBC)
- Election results, 1997 - 2001 (BBC)
- Election results, 1997 - 2001 (Election Demon)
- Election results, 1997 - 2010 (Guardian)
