= George Touche =

British accountant and politician

Sir George Touche Bt
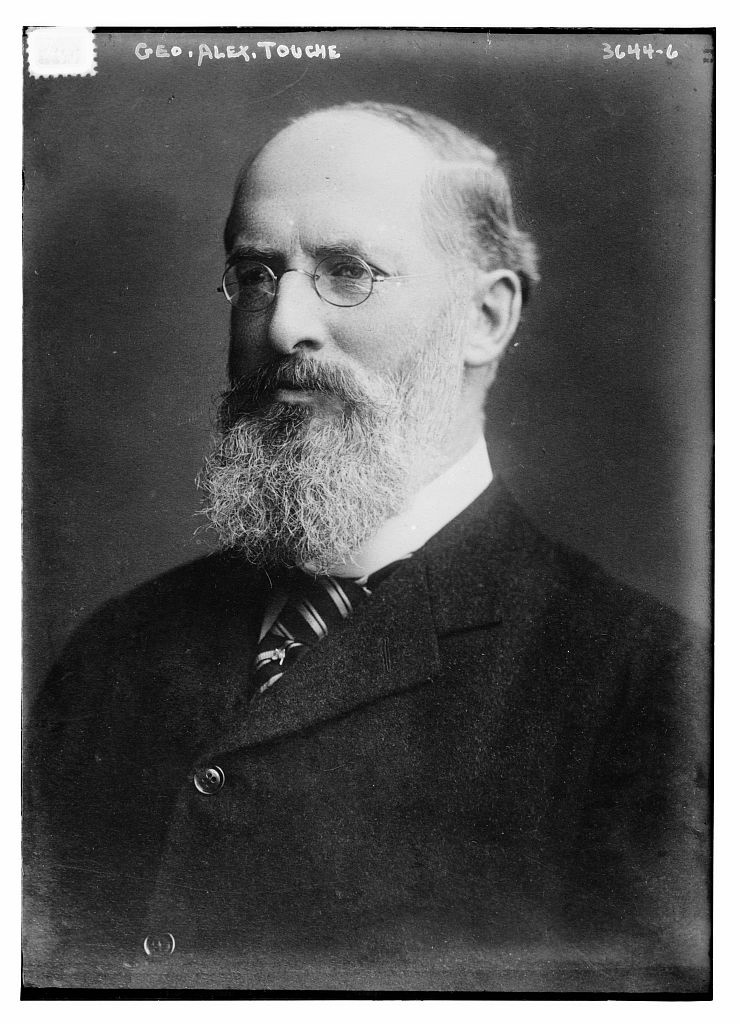
- Touche in 1915

Member of Parliament for Islington North
- In office 1910–1918

Personal details
- Born: George Alexander Touch; 24 May 1861 Edinburgh, Scotland
- Died: 7 July 1935 (aged 74)
- Education: University of Edinburgh
- Occupation: Accountant

Sir George Alexander Touche, 1st Baronet (/ˈtuːʃ/; born Touch; 24 May 1861 – 7 July 1935) was a British accountant and politician. He founded one of the firms which amalgamated to create Deloitte Touche Tohmatsu.

== Early life and career ==
Touche was born on 24 May 1861 in Edinburgh, the son of a banker. He was educated at the Bonnington Academy, the Edinburgh Institution, and the University of Edinburgh and was indentured to a chartered accountant in 1878. In 1883 he was admitted to the Society of Accountants in Edinburgh and immediately left for London, joining the firm of Broads, Patterson & May.

== Later career ==
In 1889 he was appointed first secretary of the Industrial and General Trust, later becoming manager, director in 1898, and chairman in 1908. He also became director and chairman of many other companies. In 1899 he founded his own practice, George A. Touch & Co.

In 1910 he was elected as the Conservative Member of Parliament for North Islington, but retired due to ill-health in 1918.

He was knighted in 1917 and created a baronet for his political services in the 1920 Birthday Honours.

Touche died on 7 July 1935.

== Footnotes ==
Baronetage of the United Kingdom
New creation	Baronet (of Westcott); 1920–1935	Succeeded by Norman Touche
Parliament of the United Kingdom
Preceded by David Waterlow	Member of Parliament for Islington North; December 1910–1918	Succeeded by Sir Newton Moore
