= Dorking (constituency) =

Former parliamentary constituency in the United Kingdom

- Former county constituency for the House of Commons
- Location of Surrey within England
- County: Surrey
- Major settlements: Dorking and Horley

1950–1983
- Seats: One
- Created from: Reigate and Guildford
- Replaced by: Mole Valley, Esher and Reigate

Dorking was a parliamentary constituency centred on the towns of Dorking and Horley in Surrey. It returned one Member of Parliament (MP) to the House of Commons of the Parliament of the United Kingdom from 1950 – 1983. In the eight elections during its 33-year lifetime it was held by three Conservatives successively.

== History ==
The seat was created by the Representation of the People Act 1948 and first contested at the 1950 general election. It was abolished prior to the 1983 general election.

== Boundaries ==
The Urban District of Dorking, the Rural District of Dorking and Horley, and in the Rural District of Guildford the parishes of Albury, East Clandon, East Horsley, Effingham, Ockham, Ripley, St Martha, Send, Shere, West Clandon, West Horsley, and Winsley.

In 1983 parliamentary boundaries were realigned to those of the local government districts created in 1974: the town of Dorking became part of Mole Valley district, and just over half of the previous area was transferred to the Mole Valley seat for national elections which took in territory to the north from elsewhere. Horley transferred to the redrawn Reigate seat.

== Members of Parliament ==
Election	Member	Party	Notes
1950	Gordon Touche	Conservative	Member for Reigate (1931–1950)
1964	George Sinclair	Conservative	
1979	Keith Wickenden	Conservative	
1983	Constituency abolished: see Mole Valley		

== Elections ==
=== Elections in the 1950s ===
General election 1950: Dorking
Party	Candidate	Votes	%
Conservative	Gordon Touche	22,096	59.2
Labour	Julian Richard	11,114	29.8
Liberal	George Francis	4,128	11.1
Majority		10,982	29.4
Turnout		37,338	83.4
Registered electors			
Conservative win (new seat)			

General election 1951: Dorking
Party	Candidate	Votes	%	±%
Conservative	Gordon Touche	24,416	65.85	
Labour	Julian D Richard	12,664	34.15	
Majority		11,752	31.70	
Turnout		37,080		
Registered electors				
Conservative hold		Swing		

General election 1955: Dorking
Party	Candidate	Votes	%	±%
Conservative	Gordon Touche	24,451	67.19	
Labour	Robert Patrick E Walsh	11,942	32.81	
Majority		12,509	34.38	
Turnout		36,393		
Registered electors				
Conservative hold		Swing		

General election 1959: Dorking
Party	Candidate	Votes	%	±%
Conservative	Gordon Touche	24,564	60.3	−6.9
Labour	Stanley R Mills	9,605	23.6	−8.8
Liberal	Wilfred Sydney Watson	6,582	16.1	New
Majority		14,959	36.7	+2.3
Turnout		40,751		
Registered electors				
Conservative hold		Swing		

=== Elections in the 1960s ===
General election 1964: Dorking
Party	Candidate	Votes	%	±%
Conservative	George Sinclair	23,862	55.6	−4.7
Labour	Douglas Sidney Tilbé	9,806	22.9	−0.7
Liberal	Wilfred Sydney Watson	8,773	20.4	+4.3
Patriotic Party	Barbara Davies	476	1.1	New
Majority		14,056	32.7	−4.0
Turnout		42,917		
Registered electors				
Conservative hold		Swing		

General election 1966: Dorking
Party	Candidate	Votes	%	±%
Conservative	George Sinclair	23,087	53.8	−1.8
Labour	Betty Dunmore	12,201	28.4	+5.5
Liberal	George H Kahan	7,629	17.8	−2.6
Majority		10,886	25.4	−7.3
Turnout		42,917	79.0	
Registered electors				
Conservative hold		Swing		

=== Elections in the 1970s ===
General election 1970: Dorking
Party	Candidate	Votes	%	±%
Conservative	George Sinclair	25,393	59.0	+5.2
Labour	W. John Fahy	10,523	24.5	−3.9
Liberal	John Baker	7,103	16.5	−1.3
Majority		14,870	34.5	+9.1
Turnout		43,019	72.0	−7.0
Registered electors				
Conservative hold		Swing	+4.6	

General election February 1974: Dorking
Party	Candidate	Votes	%	±%
Conservative	George Sinclair	24,803	51.4	−7.6
Liberal	G S A Andrews	14,490	30.0	+13.5
Labour	J R Spiers	8,961	18.6	−5.9
Majority		10,313	21.4	−13.1
Turnout		48,254	82.6	+10.6
Registered electors				
Conservative hold		Swing		

General election October 1974: Dorking
Party	Candidate	Votes	%	±%
Conservative	George Sinclair	22,403	50.6	−0.8
Liberal	G S A Andrews	12,098	27.4	−2.6
Labour	Jane Chapman	9,714	22.0	+3.4
Majority		10,305	23.2	+1.8
Turnout		44,215	75.0	−7.6
Registered electors				
Conservative hold		Swing		

General election 1979: Dorking
Party	Candidate	Votes	%	±%
Conservative	Keith Wickenden	29,003	61.43	+10.83
Liberal	R Hope	9,240	19.57	−7.83
Labour	JAS Weir	8,970	19.00	−3.0
Majority		19,763	41.86	+18.7
Turnout		47,213	77.87	+2.9
Registered electors				
Conservative hold		Swing	+9.33	
