= George Sinclair (politician) =

English politician

Sir George Evelyn Sinclair CMG OBE
- George Evelyn Sinclair pictured in the 1931 Abingdon School cricket first team
- Born: 6 November 1912; Penzance
- Died: 21 September 2005 (aged 92); Ipswich

Sir George Evelyn Sinclair CMG OBE (6 November 1912 – 21 September 2005) was Conservative MP for Dorking, Surrey, 1964–79.

== Education ==
Sinclair was a bright pupil at Abingdon School from 1923 to 1931, and one of a group known as the 'Grundy boys' – named after the then headmaster. His brothers, James Francis Sinclair and Lindsay Sinclair, also attended the school. Sinclair left the school having become Head of School, Captain of Boats, Captain of Cricket, Captain of Rugby and having won the Pembroke Scholarship. In 1969 he returned to the school as a governor. He read Greats at Pembroke College, Oxford.

== Career ==
In 1936, Sinclair joined the Colonial Service and was posted to the Gold Coast. He served with the Royal West African Frontier Force during World War II. After the war he returned to the Gold Coast, then served in Togoland. He was deputy governor of Cyprus from 1955 to 1960, during the EOKA troubles. He was appointed OBE in 1950, CMG in 1956 and knighted for his Colonial Service work in 1960. Sinclair was a councillor on Wimbledon Borough Council from 1962.

He became the Conservative Party MP for Dorking. He won his seat with a 14,056 majority.

Through his parliamentary tenure, he held a mixture of progressive and traditionalist views: he supported racial minorities' rights, abortion and protection of the environment, yet he also opposed decriminalisation of homosexuality, advocated for stricter immigration policies, criticized the abolition of capital punishment, and called for the United Kingdom to join the war in Vietnam. He retired from Parliament in 1979, but continued in public life, and was especially involved with the Global Forum of Spiritual and Parliamentary Leaders on Human Survival.

He was on the governing body of Abingdon School from 1969 to 1988 and was Chairman of the Governors from 1972 to 1980.

== Personal life ==
In 1941, Sinclair married his first wife Katharine Jayne Burdekin, the elder daughter of the speculative novelist Katharine Burdekin, and a son and three daughters followed. Sinclair's wife Katharine died in 1971, and he married Mary Sawday in 1972.

== See also ==
- List of Old Abingdonians

Parliament of the United Kingdom
Preceded by Sir Gordon Touche	Member of Parliament for Dorking; 1964–1979	Succeeded by Keith Wickenden
