= Dorking and Horley =

UK Parliament constituency (since 2024)

Coordinates: 51.2°N 0.32°W

- County constituency for the House of Commons
- Interactive map of boundaries from 2024
- Boundary of Dorking and Horley in South East England
- County: Surrey
- Electorate: 70,317 (2023)
- Major settlements: Dorking, Horley, Great Bookham

Current constituency
- Created: 2024
- Member of Parliament: Chris Coghlan (Liberal Democrats)
- Seats: One
- Created from: Mole Valley

Dorking and Horley is a constituency of the House of Commons in the UK Parliament. Further to the completion of the 2023 review of Westminster constituencies, it was first contested in the 2024 general election, since when it has been represented by Chris Coghlan of the Liberal Democrats.

The constituency is named for the towns of Dorking and Horley in Surrey.

== Constituency profile ==
Dorking and Horley is a rural constituency located in central Surrey. Its largest settlement is the town of Horley with a population of around 23,000. Other settlements include the town of Dorking, the connected villages of Great Bookham and Fetcham and many smaller villages. The Surrey Hills National Landscape runs through the constituency. The towns of Dorking and Horley are connected by rail to London and Crawley, and many residents commute to these locations for work. The constituency is affluent with low levels of deprivation, and house prices are high.

Compared to the country as a whole, residents of the constituency are older and have high levels of income. They are more likely to be homeowners, to be degree-educated and to work in professional occupations. White people made up 92% of the population at the 2021 census. At the local council level, the west and north of the constituency around Dorking and Fetcham are mostly represented by Liberal Democrats, whilst the east around Horley is mostly represented by Conservatives. In the 2016 referendum on European Union membership, voters in the constituency were evenly split with an estimated 50% voting for each option.

== Boundaries ==
The constituency is defined as being composed of the following as they existed on 1 December 2020:

- The District of Mole Valley wards of: Beare Green; Bookham North; Bookham South; Box Hill and Headley; Brockham, Betchworth and Buckland; Capel, Leigh and Newdigate; Charlwood; Dorking North; Dorking South; Fetcham East; Fetcham West; Holmwoods; Leith Hill; Mickleham, Westhumble and Pixham; Okewood; Westcott.
- The Borough of Reigate and Banstead wards of: Horley Central & South; Horley East & Salfords; Horley West & Sidlow.
- The Borough of Waverley ward of Ewhurst

Following local government boundary reviews in Mole Valley and Waverley which came into effect in May 2023, the constituency is now composed of the following from the 2024 general election:

- The District of Mole Valley wards of: Bookham East & Eastwick Park; Bookham West; Brockham, Betchworth, Buckland, Box Hill & Headley; Capel, Leigh, Newdigate & Charlwood; Dorking North; Dorking South; Fetcham; Holmwoods & Beare Green; Mickleham, Westcott & Okewood.
- The Borough of Reigate and Banstead wards of: Horley Central & South; Horley East & Salfords; Horley West & Sidlow.
- The majority of the Borough of Waverley ward of Ewhurst & Ellens Green.

The seat comprises the following areas of Surrey:

- 60% of the previous Mole Valley seat, including Dorking, Great Bookham and Fetcham
- The town of Horley from East Surrey
- The villages of Salfords and Sidlow from Reigate
- The village of Ewhurst from Guildford

== Members of Parliament ==
Mole Valley prior to 2024

Election	Member	Party
2024	Chris Coghlan	Liberal Democrats

== Elections ==
=== Elections in the 2020s ===
General election 2024: Dorking and Horley
Party	Candidate	Votes	%	±%
Liberal Democrats	Chris Coghlan	20,921	41.9	+9.8
Conservative	Marisa Heath	15,530	31.1	−20.1
Reform	Craig Young	6,898	13.8	N/A
Labour	Nadia Burrell	4,053	8.1	−1.8
Green	Lisa Scott	2,563	5.1	+0.9
Majority		5,391	10.8	N/A
Turnout		49,965	70.1	−7.4
Registered electors		71,300		
Liberal Democrats gain from Conservative		Swing	+15.0	

=== Elections in the 2010s ===
2019 notional result
Party	Vote	%
Conservative	27,883	51.2
Liberal Democrats	17,502	32.1
Labour	5,415	9.9
Green	2,302	4.2
Others	1,393	2.7
Turnout	54,495	77.5
Electorate	70,317	

== See also ==
- Parliamentary constituencies in Surrey
- List of parliamentary constituencies in the South East England (region)
