= Al Pinkerton =

British politician and academic

Doctor Al Pinkerton MP
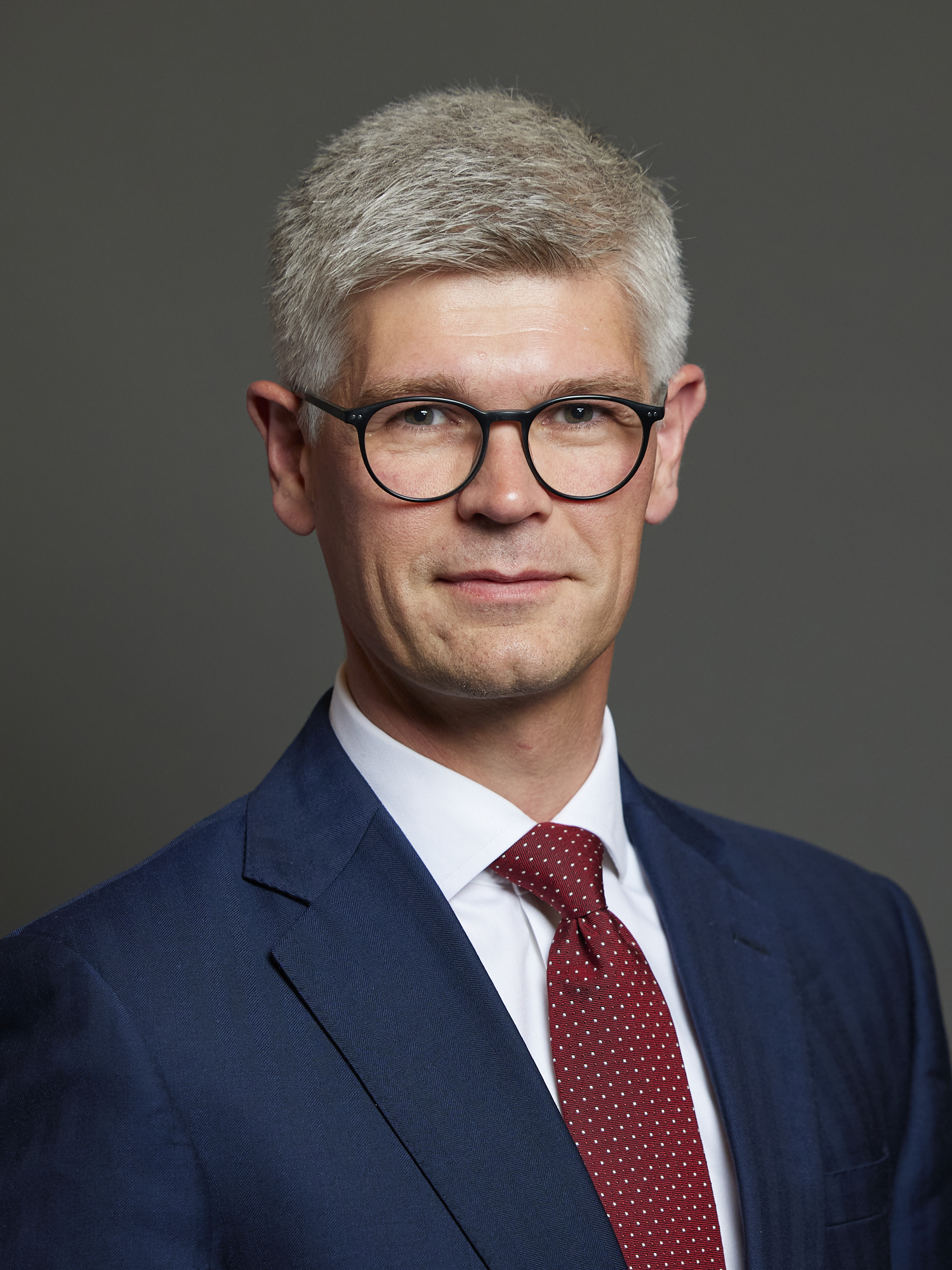
- Official portrait, 2024

Member of Parliament for Surrey Heath
- Incumbent
- Assumed office 4 July 2024
- Preceded by: Michael Gove
- Majority: 5,640 (11.8%)

Liberal Democrat portfolios
- 2024–2025: Northern Ireland
- 2025–present: Europe

Personal details
- Born: Alasdair Douglas Pinkerton Scotland
- Party: Liberal Democrats
- Children: 2
- Education: University of St Andrews (MA); Royal Holloway, University of London (PhD)
- Occupation: Academic; politician
- Website: www.alpinkerton.uk

Alasdair Douglas Pinkerton is a British politician and academic who has been the Member of Parliament (MP) for Surrey Heath since the 2024 general election. A member of the Liberal Democrats, he has worked as an associate professor in geopolitics at Royal Holloway, University of London.

Pinkerton currently sits on the Liberal Democrat frontbench team as the Spokesman for Europe.

== Early life and academic career ==
Pinkerton was born and grew up in Scotland. He graduated with a degree in geography from the University of St Andrews in 2001. In 2006, he completed a PhD in geopolitics at Royal Holloway, University of London, under the supervision of Klaus Dodds, exploring the emergence of the BBC Empire Service in the 1930s.

Since 2009, Pinkerton has worked as an academic at Royal Holloway. At the time of his election to Parliament in 2024, he was a reader (associate professor) of geopolitics. He served as an accredited observer of the 2013 Falkland Islands sovereignty referendum, and has conducted research in regions affected by international disputes and geopolitical tensions.

== Political career ==
Pinkerton first sought election to Parliament as a Liberal Democrat in the 2019 general election for Surrey Heath, finishing in second place behind the incumbent Conservative MP, Michael Gove. He spent the next five years pursuing Surrey Heath for the Liberal Democrats. The party took control of Surrey Heath Borough Council in 2023, for the first time in the borough's history.

In the 2024 general election, Pinkerton was elected as MP for Surrey Heath with 44.8 per cent of the vote and a majority of 5,640. He became the first non-Conservative MP to represent the area in 118 years.

On 18 September 2024, Ed Davey announced his new Frontbench Team. Al Pinkerton became Spokesperson for Northern Ireland within the team.

On 30 September 2025, Ed Davey announced that Al Pinkerton would be the Liberal Democrat Spokesperson for Europe.

== Published works ==
- Dodds, Klaus; Pinkerton, Alasdair (October 2013). "The Falkland Islands referendum 2013". Polar Record. 49 (4): 413–416. Bibcode:2013PoRec..49..413D. doi:10.1017/S0032247413000326. ISSN 0032-2474.
- Adey, Peter; Bowstead, Janet C.; Brickell, Katherine; Desai, Vandana; Dolton, Mike; Pinkerton, Alasdair; Siddiqi, Ayesha, eds. (2020). The Handbook of Displacement. doi:10.1007/978-3-030-47178-1. ISBN 978-3-030-47177-4.

Parliament of the United Kingdom
Preceded by Michael Gove	Member of Parliament for Surrey Heath; 2024–present	Incumbent
