= Mole Valley (constituency) =

UK Parliament constituency (1983–2024)

Coordinates: 51.266°N 0.328°W

- Former county constituency for the House of Commons
- Boundary of Mole Valley in Surrey

- Location of Surrey within England
- County: Surrey
- Electorate: 72,568 (December 2010)
- Major settlements: Dorking, Leatherhead, Fetcham and Great Bookham

1983–2024
- Seats: One
- Created from: Dorking and Epsom & Ewell
- Replaced by: Dorking and Horley

Mole Valley was a constituency in Surrey represented in the House of Commons of the UK Parliament since 1997 by Sir Paul Beresford, a Conservative, until it was abolished in 2024, primarily replaced by Dorking and Horley.

== Boundaries ==
Map of boundaries 1997–2024

1983–1997: The District of Mole Valley, and the Borough of Guildford ward of Tillingbourne.

1997–2024: The District of Mole Valley wards of Beare Green, Bookham North, Bookham South, Box Hill and Headley, Brockham, Betchworth and Buckland, Capel, Leigh and Newdigate, Charlwood, Dorking North, Dorking South, Fetcham East, Fetcham West, Holmwoods, Leatherhead North, Leatherhead South, Leith Hill, Mickleham, Westhumble and Pixham, Okewood, and Westcott; and the Borough of Guildford wards of Clandon and Horsley, Effingham, Lovelace, Send, and Tillingbourne.

The constituency was larger than the Mole Valley District of Surrey as it included five wards in the east of the Borough of Guildford, three of which are nearer to Woking than to Dorking. The largest town in the Mole Valley constituency was Dorking, the second largest was Leatherhead and there are many rural and semi-rural villages, generally within one hour's reach of London so properly classed as part of the London Commuter Belt.

Further to the completion of the 2023 review of Westminster constituencies, the seat underwent boundary changes, adding the town of Horley, and losing Leatherhead. As a consequence, it was reformed as the new seat of Dorking and Horley, starting from the 2024 general election.

== History and constituency profile ==
The county constituency was created in 1983; much of the same area was covered by the Dorking constituency which preceded it. It was a Conservative safe seat in terms of length of party tenure and great size of its majorities. It has a majority adult demographic of affluent middle-class families living in commuter towns and villages speedily connected to business parks by road and central London by rail, it was one of a few seats to return a new candidate as Conservative MP who won a majority in excess of 10,000 in the 1997 Labour landslide; the main opposition since 1983 was the Liberal Democrats and their largest predecessor party, the Liberal Party.

== Members of Parliament ==
Election	Member	Party
1983	Kenneth Baker	Conservative
1997	Sir Paul Beresford	Conservative

== Elections ==
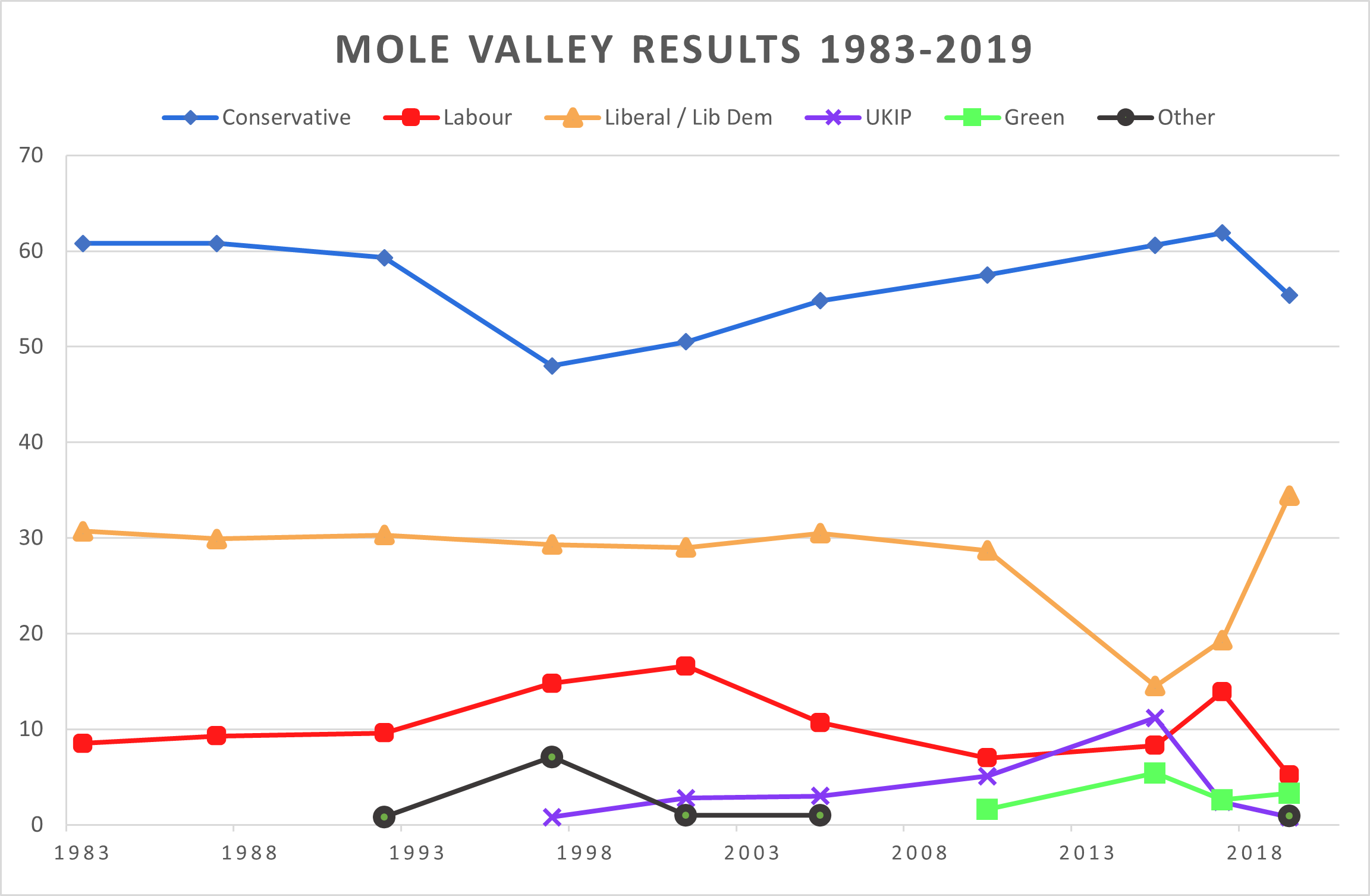
General election results from 1983–2019

=== Elections in the 2010s ===
General election 2019: Mole Valley
Party	Candidate	Votes	%	±%
Conservative	Paul Beresford	31,656	55.4	−6.5
Liberal Democrats	Paul Kennedy	19,615	34.4	+15.1
Labour	Brian Bostock	2,965	5.2	−8.7
Green	Lisa Scott-Conte	1,874	3.3	+0.7
Independent	Robin Horsley	536	0.9	New
UKIP	Geoffrey Cox	464	0.8	−1.6
Majority		12,041	21.0	−21.6
Turnout		57,110	76.5	+0.2
Conservative hold		Swing	−10.7	

General election 2017: Mole Valley
Party	Candidate	Votes	%	±%
Conservative	Paul Beresford	35,092	61.9	+1.3
Liberal Democrats	Paul Kennedy	10,955	19.3	+4.8
Labour	Marc Green	7,864	13.9	+5.6
Green	Jacquetta Fewster	1,463	2.6	−2.8
UKIP	Judy Moore	1,352	2.4	−8.8
Majority		24,137	42.6	−3.5
Turnout		56,866	76.3	+2.1
Conservative hold		Swing	−1.8	

General election 2015: Mole Valley
Party	Candidate	Votes	%	±%
Conservative	Paul Beresford	33,434	60.6	+3.1
Liberal Democrats	Paul Kennedy	7,981	14.5	−14.2
UKIP	Paul Oakley	6,181	11.2	+6.1
Labour	Leonard Amos	4,565	8.3	+1.3
Green	Jacquetta Fewster	2,979	5.4	+3.8
Majority		25,453	46.1	+17.3
Turnout		55,329	74.2	−0.6
Conservative hold		Swing	+8.7	

General election 2010: Mole Valley
Party	Candidate	Votes	%	±%
Conservative	Paul Beresford	31,263	57.5	+2.7
Liberal Democrats	Alice Humphreys	15,610	28.7	−1.8
Labour	James Dove	3,804	7.0	−3.7
UKIP	Leigh Jones	2,752	5.1	+2.1
Green	Rob Sedgwick	895	1.6	New
Majority		15,653	28.8	+4.5
Turnout		54,324	74.8	+3.3
Conservative hold		Swing	+2.3	

=== Elections in the 2000s ===
General election 2005: Mole Valley
Party	Candidate	Votes	%	±%
Conservative	Paul Beresford	27,060	54.8	+4.3
Liberal Democrats	Nasser Butt	15,063	30.5	+1.5
Labour	Farmida Bi	5,310	10.7	−5.9
UKIP	David Payne	1,475	3.0	+0.2
Veritas	Roger Meekins	507	1.0	New
Majority		11,997	24.3	+2.8
Turnout		49,415	72.5	+3.6
Conservative hold		Swing	+1.4	

General election 2001: Mole Valley
Party	Candidate	Votes	%	±%
Conservative	Paul Beresford	23,790	50.5	+2.5
Liberal Democrats	Celia Savage	13,637	29.0	−0.3
Labour	Dan Redford	7,837	16.6	+1.8
UKIP	Ronald Walters	1,333	2.8	+2.0
ProLife Alliance	William Newton	475	1.0	New
Majority		10,153	21.5	+2.8
Turnout		47,072	68.9	−9.5
Conservative hold		Swing	+1.4	

=== Elections in the 1990s ===
This constituency underwent boundary changes between the 1992 and 1997 general elections and thus change in share of vote is based on a notional calculation.

General election 1997: Mole Valley
Party	Candidate	Votes	%	±%
Conservative	Paul Beresford	26,178	48.0	−13.3
Liberal Democrats	Stephen Cooksey	15,957	29.3	+0.6
Labour	Christopher Payne	8,057	14.8	+5.4
Referendum	Nick Taber	2,424	4.4	New
Ind. Conservative	Richard Burley	1,276	2.3	New
UKIP	Ian Cameron	435	0.8	New
Natural Law	Judith Thomas	197	0.4	−0.4
Majority		10,221	18.7	−10.3
Turnout		54,524	78.4	−3.6
Conservative hold		Swing	−6.9	

General election 1992: Mole Valley
Party	Candidate	Votes	%	±%
Conservative	Kenneth Baker	32,549	59.3	−1.5
Liberal Democrats	Michael Watson	16,599	30.3	+0.4
Labour	Tim Walsh	5,291	9.6	+0.3
Natural Law	Judith Thomas	442	0.8	New
Majority		15,950	29.0	−1.9
Turnout		54,881	82.0	+5.0
Conservative hold		Swing	−0.9	

=== Elections in the 1980s ===
General election 1987: Mole Valley
Party	Candidate	Votes	%	±%
Conservative	Kenneth Baker	31,689	60.8	±0.0
Liberal	Susan Thomas	15,613	29.9	−0.8
Labour	Christopher King	4,846	9.3	+0.8
Majority		16,076	30.9	+0.8
Turnout		52,148	77.0	+2.0
Conservative hold		Swing	+0.4	

General election 1983: Mole Valley
Party	Candidate	Votes	%	±%
Conservative	Kenneth Baker	29,691	60.8	
Liberal	Susan Thomas	14,973	30.7	
Labour	Fanny Lines	4,147	8.5	
Majority		14,718	30.1	
Turnout		48,811	75.0	
Conservative win (new seat)				

== See also ==
- Parliamentary constituencies in Surrey

== Bibliography ==
- Election result, 2017 & 2015 (BBC)
- Election result, 2010 (BBC)
- Election result, 2005 (BBC)
- Election results, 1997 - 2001 (BBC)
- Election results, 1997 - 2001 (Election Demon)
- Election results, 1983 - 1992 (Election Demon)
- Election results, 1992 - 2010 (Guardian)
- Election result, 2010 (UKPollingReport)
