= Henrietta Adler =

British politician

- Born: 1 December 1868; London, England
- Died: 15 April 1950 (aged 81); London, England
- Other name: Nettie Adler
- Occupation: Politician
- Political party: Liberal

Henrietta Adler JP (1 December 1868 – 15 April 1950), also known as Nettie Adler, was a British Liberal Party politician who was one of the first women to be elected to and to be able to take her seat on the London County Council.

== Early life ==
Adler was born in London on 1 December 1868. She was the daughter of Hermann Adler, who would later succeed his father as chief rabbi, and Rachel Adler. She was educated at a private school and classes.

== Career ==
Adler began social work as a school manager under the London School Board. She was honorary secretary of the Committee on Wage Earning Children, 1899–1946. She was a Member of Council of the Anglo-Jewish Association and a member of the Jewish Board of Guardians. She was a justice of the peace.

== Political career ==
Adler was a Liberal Party member, which in London local government was aligned with the Progressive Party. She was first politically active in her home area of Hackney. Her main political interest was in education. She was a member of the governing bodies of the Dalston County School, of the Hackney Downs School and the Hackney Technical Institute. Due to her interest in educational matters she was co-opted onto the London Education Committee by the Progressive majority in 1905, serving as on that body until she was elected to it following the 1910 London County Council election. When the Liberal government first created the London County Council in 1899 there was no stipulation that women could not stand as candidates for election and two Progressive women candidates stood and were elected. However, there was a legal challenge made by one of the defeated Conservative candidates and as a result, neither of the women were able to take their seats. When the Liberal Party returned to power, they changed the law in 1908 to allow women to be elected to the London County Council and this change came into effect for the 1910 elections. Adler was one of two women who were elected, as one of the representatives for the constituency of Hackney Central in 1910.

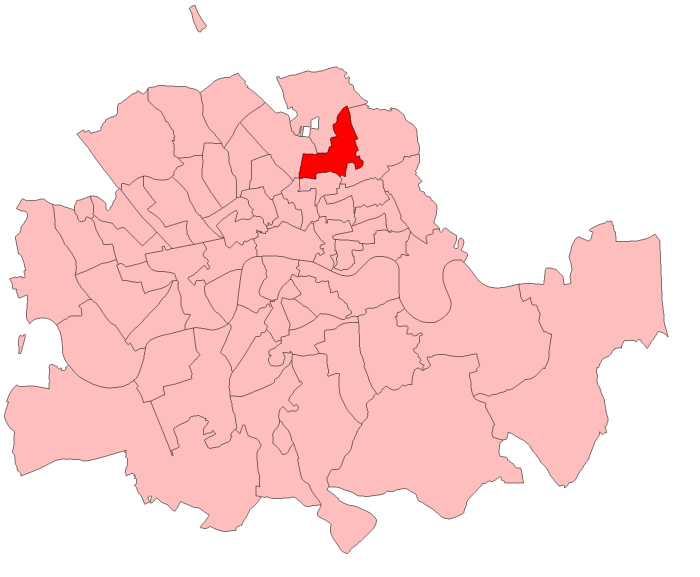
Hackney Central in London

London County Council election, 1910: Hackney Central
| Party | Candidate | Votes | % | ±% |
|---|---|---|---|---|
| Progressive | ✓ Alfred James Shepheard | 3,684 | 27.5 | |
| Progressive | ✓ Henrietta Adler | 3,521 | 26.2 | |
| Municipal Reform | G J Dowse | 3,157 | 23.5 | |
| Municipal Reform | John Foster Vesey-FitzGerald | 3,053 | 22.8 | |
| Majority | | 527 | 4.0 | |
| Progressive gain from Municipal Reform | | Swing | | |
| Majority | | 364 | 2.7 | |
| Progressive gain from Municipal Reform | | Swing | | |

In March 1913 she was re-elected, although her running mate lost to the Municipal Reform Party;

London County Council election, 1913: Hackney Central
| Party | Candidate | Votes | % | ±% |
|---|---|---|---|---|
| Municipal Reform | ✓ William Ray | 3,670 | 25.2 | |
| Progressive | ✓ Henrietta Adler | 3,653 | 25.0 | −1.2 |
| Municipal Reform | Lord William Cecil | 3,645 | 25.0 | |
| Progressive | Alfred James Shepheard | 3,622 | 24.8 | |
| Majority | | 8 | | |
| Progressive hold | | Swing | n/a | |
| Majority | | 48 | | |
| Municipal Reform gain from Progressive | | Swing | | |

In March 1919, following the end of the war, the boundaries for her constituency were slightly altered and she was returned unopposed due to an electoral agreement of the Progressive and Municipal Reform parties to only adopt one candidate each;

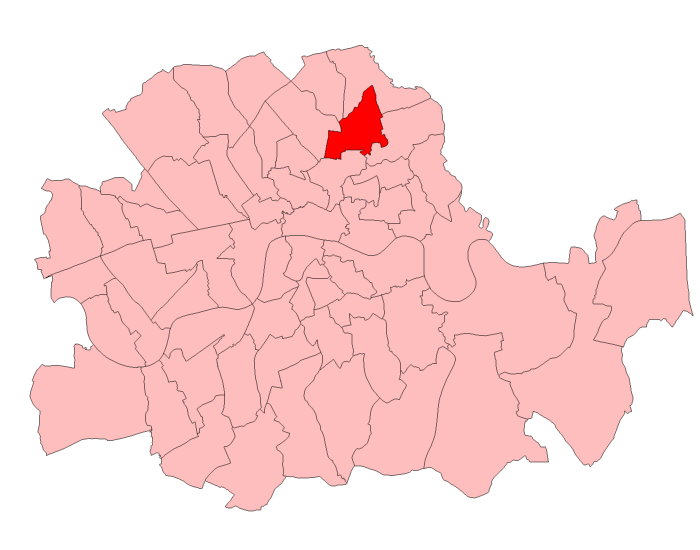
Hackney Central in London

London County Council election, 1919: Hackney Central
| Party | Candidate | Votes | % | ±% |
|---|---|---|---|---|
| Progressive | ✓ Henrietta Adler | Unopposed | n/a | n/a |
| Municipal Reform | ✓ William Ray | Unopposed | n/a | n/a |
| Progressive hold | | Swing | n/a | |
| Municipal Reform hold | | Swing | n/a | |

In March 1922 the electoral arrangement between the Progressive and Municipal Reform parties continued;

Adler

London County Council election, 1922: Hackney Central
| Party | Candidate | Votes | % | ±% |
|---|---|---|---|---|
| Progressive | ✓ Henrietta Adler | Unopposed | n/a | n/a |
| Municipal Reform | ✓ William Ray | Unopposed | n/a | n/a |
| Progressive hold | | Swing | n/a | |
| Municipal Reform hold | | Swing | n/a | |

From 1922 to 1923 she served as deputy chair of the London County Council. She was defeated in 1925.

London County Council election, 1925: Hackney Central
| Party | Candidate | Votes | % | ±% |
|---|---|---|---|---|
| Municipal Reform | ✓ William Ray | 4,878 | | |
| Municipal Reform | ✓ Humfrey Henry Edmunds | 4,595 | | |
| Labour | P H Black | 3,299 | | n/a |
| Labour | John Hunter Harley | 3,183 | | n/a |
| Progressive | Henrietta Adler | 2,759 | | |
| Progressive | A Mortimer | 2,436 | | |
| Municipal Reform gain from Progressive | | Swing | n/a | |
| Municipal Reform hold | | Swing | n/a | |

She was a Member of the Departmental Committee on Charity Collections, 1925–27. Following the demise of the Progressive Party she was re-elected to the LCC in 1928 standing as a Liberal Party candidate;

London County Council election, 1928: Hackney Central
| Party | Candidate | Votes | % | ±% |
|---|---|---|---|---|
| Municipal Reform | ✓ William Ray | 5,092 | | |
| Liberal | ✓ Henrietta Adler | 5,008 | | |
| Municipal Reform | Lord Cranbrook | 4,960 | | |
| Liberal | G J Lusher-Pentney | 4,820 | | |
| Labour | Amy Sayle | 2,743 | | |
| Labour | H W Butler | 2,737 | | |
| Independent Labour | S L Alexander | 625 | | n/a |
| Independent Labour | J W Head | 593 | | n/a |
| Liberal gain from Municipal Reform | | Swing | | |
| Municipal Reform hold | | Swing | | |

She was finally defeated in 1931.

London County Council election, 1931: Hackney Central
| Party | Candidate | Votes | % | ±% |
|---|---|---|---|---|
| Municipal Reform | ✓ Sir William Ray | 5,468 | | |
| Municipal Reform | ✓ Montague Moustardier | 5,224 | | |
| Labour | Dr Bernard Homa | 3,715 | | |
| Labour | Dr Mary O'Brien-Harris | 3,672 | | |
| Liberal | Henrietta Adler | 2,774 | | |
| Liberal | H Baily | 2,324 | | |
| Municipal Reform gain from Liberal | | Swing | | |
| Municipal Reform hold | | Swing | | |

Despite her election defeat in 1931, she was co-opted onto the London County Council Public Health Committee for a three-year term.
