= Richmond (Surrey) =

Parliamentary constituency in the United Kingdom, 1918–1983

Richmond Richmond (Surrey) Richmond-upon-Thames, Richmond
- Former borough constituency for the House of Commons
- County: 1918–1965 Surrey; 1965–1983 Greater London
- Major settlements: Richmond; Barnes, London; Mortlake (including East Sheen)

1918–1983
- Seats: One
- Created from: Kingston
- Replaced by: Richmond and Barnes

Richmond (1918–1983) was a parliamentary constituency centred on the town of Richmond. The seat mirrored for its first 47 years a small northern projection of Surrey (between Middlesex and the County of London). For the final 18 years its area, in local government, fell into the new county of Greater London.

Each winning candidate was a Unionist or from the allied Conservative Party.

Formally and informally on a local basis Richmond constituency; national publications usually added a reference to Surrey to distinguish Richmond (Yorks) (UK Parliament constituency) (1585–2024).

== History ==
The constituency was created by the Representation of the People Act 1918 for the 1918 general election. The area had been roughly the northern part of Kingston (also in Surrey).

From April 1965 the constituency formed part of Greater London. It was the eastern half of the London Borough of Richmond upon Thames. The Second Periodical Review of the Parliamentary Boundary Commission for England in 1969 formally made "a slight modification in the names to conform with our policy of using the London borough name as a prefix", so that the constituency was formally known as 'Richmond upon Thames, Richmond'. Due to its prolix this was never used in the popular press. No boundary changes were made.

The seat was abolished for the 1983 general election; replaced by Richmond and Barnes which took in a small part of former Middlesex, the local government electoral ward of East Twickenham.

=== Single-member seat ===
Not based on an ancient borough or key town, it reflected the schema of the third Great Reform three decades before its creation, continued by the Fourth Reform Act, Lloyd George's Representation of the People Act 1918 by returning one Member of Parliament (MP) to the House of Commons of the UK Parliament, elected by first past the post.

== Boundaries ==
In 1918 the seat was created as a borough constituency of Surrey. It was in the north-west corner of the much-reduced county (in the 1880s) and adjoined the south bank of the River Thames. It comprised the Municipal Borough of Richmond which included Kew and Petersham, as well as the Urban Districts of Barnes and Ham.

In 1932 the Barnes Urban District was upgraded to a municipal borough. In the following year most of Ham was incorporated in the Municipal Borough of Richmond. These were local government reconfigurations.

In the redistribution of parliamentary seats which took effect in 1950, this seat was little changed. It was defined in the Representation of the People Act 1948 as comprising the Municipal Boroughs of Barnes and Richmond. There were some minor boundary changes to the two Municipal Boroughs, which affected the parliamentary seat from 1964 (per S.I. 1960–465).

Incorporated in Greater London from 1965, the redistribution of parliamentary seats which took effect in 1974 did not change the constituency boundaries. It did however recast the definition of the boundaries, which set the constituency as comprising the following wards of the London Borough: Barnes, East Sheen, Ham, Petersham, Kew, Mortlake, Palewell, Richmond Hill and Richmond Town. The constituency shared boundaries with the Richmond electoral division for election of councillors to the Greater London Council at elections in 1973, 1977 and 1981.

== Members of Parliament ==
| Event | Member | Party |
|---|---|---|
| 1918 | Clifford Blackburn Edgar | Unionist |
| 1922 | Harry Becker | Independent Unionist |
| 1923 | Harry Becker | Unionist |
| 1924 | Sir Newton Moore | Unionist |
| 1932 by-election | Sir William Ray | Conservative |
| 1937 by-election | George Harvie-Watt | Conservative |
| 1959 | Anthony Royle | Conservative |
| 1983 | constituency abolished: see Richmond & Barnes | |

== Elections ==
=== Elections in the 1910s ===
General election 1918: Richmond, Surrey
| Party | | Candidate | Votes | % |
|---|---|---|---|---|
| C | Unionist | Clifford Edgar | 8,364 | 47.4 |
| | Independent | Norah Elam | 3,615 | 20.4 |
| | Liberal | R. James Morrison | 3,491 | 19.7 |
| | Independent | W. Walter Crotch | 2,220 | 12.5 |
| Majority | | | 4,749 | 27.0 |
| Turnout | | | 17,690 | 53.8 |
| | Unionist win (new seat) | | | |
C indicates candidate endorsed by the coalition government.

=== Elections in the 1920s ===
Corbett Ashby

General election 1922: Richmond (Surrey)
| Party | Candidate | Votes | % | ±% |
|---|---|---|---|---|
| Ind. Unionist | Harry Becker* | 12,075 | 50.6 | New |
| Unionist | Clifford Blackburn Edgar | 6,032 | 25.3 | −22.1 |
| Liberal | Margery Corbett Ashby | 5,765 | 24.1 | +4.4 |
| Majority | | 6,043 | 25.3 | N/A |
| Turnout | | 23,872 | 68.8 | +15.0 |
| Ind. Unionist gain from Unionist | | Swing | | |

- supported by Anti-Waste League

General election 1923: Richmond (Surrey)
| Party | Candidate | Votes | % | ±% |
|---|---|---|---|---|
| Unionist | Harry Becker | 13,112 | 63.0 | +37.7 |
| Liberal | Margery Corbett Ashby | 7,702 | 37.0 | +12.9 |
| Majority | | 5,410 | 26.0 | N/A |
| Turnout | | 20,814 | 59.4 | −9.4 |
| Unionist gain from Ind. Unionist | | Swing | | |

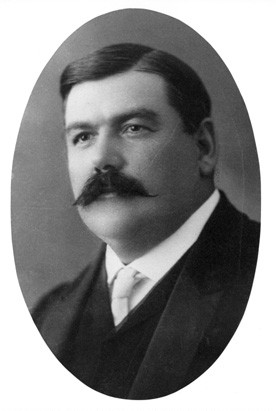
Moore

General election 1924: Richmond, Surrey
| Party | Candidate | Votes | % | ±% |
|---|---|---|---|---|
| Unionist | Newton Moore | 19,948 | 76.8 | +13.8 |
| Labour | Herbert Parker | 6,034 | 23.2 | New |
| Majority | | 13,914 | 53.6 | +27.6 |
| Turnout | | 25,982 | 72.8 | +13.4 |
| Unionist hold | | Swing | | |

General election 1929: Richmond, Surrey
| Party | Candidate | Votes | % | ±% |
|---|---|---|---|---|
| Unionist | Newton Moore | 23,148 | 58.7 | −18.1 |
| Labour | Philip Butler | 9,520 | 24.1 | +0.9 |
| Liberal | William Henry Williamson | 6,802 | 17.2 | New |
| Majority | | 13,628 | 34.6 | −19.0 |
| Turnout | | 39,470 | 70.6 | −2.2 |
| Unionist hold | | Swing | -9.5 | |

=== Elections in the 1930s ===
General election 1931: Richmond (Surrey)
| Party | Candidate | Votes | % | ±% |
|---|---|---|---|---|
| Conservative | Newton Moore | 35,333 | 84.5 | +25.8 |
| Labour | John Lamb Thomson | 6,460 | 15.5 | −8.6 |
| Majority | | 28,873 | 69.0 | +34.4 |
| Turnout | | 41,793 | 72.0 | +1.4 |
| Unionist hold | | Swing | +17.2 | |

1932 Richmond-upon-Thames by-election
| Party | Candidate | Votes | % | ±% |
|---|---|---|---|---|
| Conservative | William Ray | Unopposed | N/A | N/A |
| Conservative hold | | | | |

General election 1935: Richmond (Surrey)
| Party | Candidate | Votes | % | ±% |
|---|---|---|---|---|
| Conservative | William Ray | 30,433 | 73.5 | −11.0 |
| Labour | Lewis Gassman | 10,953 | 26.5 | +11.0 |
| Majority | | 19,480 | 47.0 | −22.0 |
| Turnout | | 41,386 | 69.8 | −2.2 |
| Conservative hold | | Swing | | |

1937 Richmond-upon-Thames by-election
| Party | Candidate | Votes | % | ±% |
|---|---|---|---|---|
| Conservative | George Harvie-Watt | 20,546 | 72.7 | −0.8 |
| Labour | George Rogers | 7,709 | 27.3 | +0.8 |
| Majority | | 12,837 | 45.4 | −1.6 |
| Turnout | | 28,255 | 47.3 | −22.5 |
| Conservative hold | | Swing | -0.8 | |

=== Election in the 1940s ===
General election 1945: Richmond (Surrey)
| Party | Candidate | Votes | % | ±% |
|---|---|---|---|---|
| Conservative | George Harvie-Watt | 24,085 | 52.8 | −20.7 |
| Labour | David Stark Murray | 15,760 | 34.5 | +8.0 |
| Liberal | George Andrew Douglas Gordon | 5,029 | 11.0 | New |
| Common Wealth | Douglas George Horace Frank | 753 | 1.7 | New |
| Majority | | 8,325 | 18.3 | −28.7 |
| Turnout | | 45,627 | 76.4 | +6.6 |
| Conservative hold | | Swing | -14.3 | |

=== Elections in the 1950s ===
General election 1950: Richmond (Surrey)
| Party | Candidate | Votes | % | ±% |
|---|---|---|---|---|
| Conservative | George Harvie-Watt | 30,907 | 57.4 | +4.6 |
| Labour | Karl Thorold Westwood | 17,238 | 32.1 | −2.4 |
| Liberal | David Ennals | 5,634 | 10.5 | −0.5 |
| Majority | | 13,669 | 25.3 | +7.0 |
| Turnout | | 53,779 | 86.2 | +9.8 |
| Conservative hold | | Swing | +3.5 | |

General election 1951: Richmond (Surrey)
| Party | Candidate | Votes | % | ±% |
|---|---|---|---|---|
| Conservative | George Harvie-Watt | 30,743 | 58.7 | +1.3 |
| Labour | Freda White | 16,707 | 31.9 | −0.2 |
| Liberal | David Ennals | 4,933 | 9.4 | −1.1 |
| Majority | | 14,036 | 26.8 | +1.5 |
| Turnout | | 52,383 | 82.8 | −3.4 |
| Conservative hold | | Swing | +0.7 | |

General election 1955: Richmond (Surrey)
| Party | Candidate | Votes | % | ±% |
|---|---|---|---|---|
| Conservative | George Harvie-Watt | 27,628 | 58.1 | −0.6 |
| Labour | John Stuart Barr | 14,673 | 30.8 | −1.1 |
| Liberal | Eva Mabel Haynes | 5,266 | 11.1 | +1.7 |
| Majority | | 12,955 | 27.3 | +0.5 |
| Turnout | | 47,567 | 77.5 | −5.3 |
| Conservative hold | | Swing | +0.2 | |

General election 1959: Richmond (Surrey)
| Party | Candidate | Votes | % | ±% |
|---|---|---|---|---|
| Conservative | Anthony Royle | 27,161 | 57.2 | −0.9 |
| Labour | Charles H Archibald | 12,975 | 27.3 | −3.5 |
| Liberal | John Baker | 7,359 | 15.5 | +4.4 |
| Majority | | 14,186 | 29.9 | +2.6 |
| Turnout | | 47,495 | 79.4 | +1.9 |
| Conservative hold | | Swing | +1.3 | |

=== Elections in the 1960s ===
General election 1964: Richmond (Surrey)
| Party | Candidate | Votes | % | ±% |
|---|---|---|---|---|
| Conservative | Anthony Royle | 22,203 | 50.4 | −6.8 |
| Labour | Alan Brownjohn | 14,053 | 31.9 | +4.6 |
| Liberal | John Baker | 7,800 | 17.7 | +2.2 |
| Majority | | 8,150 | 18.5 | −11.4 |
| Turnout | | 44,055 | 76.5 | −2.9 |
| Conservative hold | | Swing | -5.7 | |

General election 1966: Richmond (Surrey)
| Party | Candidate | Votes | % | ±% |
|---|---|---|---|---|
| Conservative | Anthony Royle | 21,831 | 49.5 | −0.9 |
| Labour | David George Boulton | 15,608 | 35.4 | +3.5 |
| Liberal | Peter Miles Trelawney Sheldon-Williams | 6,661 | 15.1 | −2.6 |
| Majority | | 6,223 | 14.1 | −4.4 |
| Turnout | | 44,100 | 79.4 | +2.9 |
| Conservative hold | | Swing | -2.2 | |

=== Elections in the 1970s ===
General election 1970: Richmond upon Thames, Richmond
| Party | Candidate | Votes | % | ±% |
|---|---|---|---|---|
| Conservative | Anthony Royle | 20,979 | 51.3 | +1.8 |
| Labour | Antony R. Palmer | 12,981 | 31.7 | −3.7 |
| Liberal | Stanley Rundle | 6,934 | 17.0 | +1.9 |
| Majority | | 7,998 | 19.6 | +5.5 |
| Turnout | | 40,894 | 71.7 | −7.7 |
| Conservative hold | | Swing | +2.7 | |

General election February 1974: Richmond upon Thames, Richmond
| Party | Candidate | Votes | % | ±% |
|---|---|---|---|---|
| Conservative | Anthony Royle | 19,534 | 44.3 | −7.0 |
| Liberal | Stanley Rundle | 15,707 | 35.6 | +18.6 |
| Labour | Antony R. Palmer | 8,322 | 18.8 | −12.9 |
| National Front | Eric Ashley Russell | 570 | 1.3 | New |
| Majority | | 3,827 | 8.7 | −10.9 |
| Turnout | | 44,133 | 82.6 | +10.9 |
| Conservative hold | | Swing | -12.8 | |

General election October 1974: Richmond upon Thames, Richmond
| Party | Candidate | Votes | % | ±% |
|---|---|---|---|---|
| Conservative | Anthony Royle | 17,450 | 43.2 | −1.1 |
| Liberal | Alan John Watson | 13,235 | 32.7 | −2.9 |
| Labour | Bob Marshall-Andrews | 8,714 | 21.6 | +2.8 |
| National Front | Eric Ashley Russell | 1,000 | 2.5 | +1.2 |
| Majority | | 4,215 | 10.5 | +1.8 |
| Turnout | | 40,399 | 75.1 | −7.5 |
| Conservative hold | | Swing | +0.9 | |

General election 1979: Richmond upon Thames, Richmond
| Party | Candidate | Votes | % | ±% |
|---|---|---|---|---|
| Conservative | Anthony Royle | 19,294 | 46.7 | +3.5 |
| Liberal | Alan John Watson | 16,764 | 40.5 | +7.8 |
| Labour | Julian Filochowski | 4,692 | 11.3 | −10.3 |
| Independent | Jonathan King | 315 | 0.8 | New |
| National Front | Patricia Murphy | 244 | 0.6 | −1.9 |
| Libertarian Party | *David Dean Wedgwood | 34 | 0.1 | New |
| Majority | | 2,530 | 6.2 | −4.3 |
| Turnout | | 41,343 | 81.4 | +6.3 |
| Conservative hold | | Swing | -2.0 | |

- endorsed by the English National Party of Frank Hansford-Miller

== See also ==
- List of parliamentary constituencies in London

== Sources ==
- Boundaries of Parliamentary Constituencies 1885–1972, compiled and edited by F.W.S. Craig (Parliamentary Reference Publications 1972)
- British Parliamentary Election Results 1918–1949, compiled and edited by F.W.S. Craig (The Macmillan Press 1977)
