= Frances Josephy =

British Liberal politician, journalist and lecturer

Josephy in 1935

Frances Louise Josephy (February 1900 – 1985) was a British Liberal politician, journalist and lecturer.

== Background ==
She was born in Broughty Ferry, Forfarshire. She was educated at Seymour Lodge School, Dundee, before going on to St. Andrews University and Newnham College, Cambridge. She graduated from Cambridge with a degree in Classics and English.

== Political career ==
In 1924, she joined the National League of Young Liberals. She was Research Secretary to the Radical Parliamentary Group in the House of Commons. In March 1928 she stood at the London County Council elections as a Liberal candidate for St. Marylebone alongside Harcourt Johnstone. They trailed both Municipal Reform and Labour candidates. In February 1929 she was selected as prospective Liberal candidate for Winchester for the general election. She contested Winchester in 1929. This was a safe Tory seat that they had won at every election since 1885 and at the previous election, the Liberals came third. She managed to increase the Liberal vote but still finished third. During the 1929-31 parliament she was a regular attendee of debates in both houses. She was a regular contributor to 'The Forward View' the monthly journal of the National League of Young Liberals. Her column entitled 'Seen From The Gallery' reported on the role the Liberal were playing in a parliament where they held the balance of power.

In October 1930 she was the prospective Liberal candidate for Winchester for the general election. However the prospective Liberal candidate for Basingstoke withdrew just before the 1931 election. As Basingstoke was regarded as a better prospect, she switched constituencies. She contested Basingstoke in 1931, a seat the Liberals had won in 1923. In an unfavourable year for the Liberals, she retained second place.

She became Honorary Secretary of the National League of Young Liberals, and a vice-chairman. In October 1933 she was still the prospective Liberal candidate for Basingstoke. However, a vacancy occurred in the more winnable division of Devizes and by October 1935 she had been adopted there. She contested Devizes in 1935, a seat the Liberals last won in 1923 and nearly re-gained in 1929. She managed to reduce the Tory majority.

She was re-adopted by Devizes Liberals as their prospective parliamentary candidate for a General Election expected to occur in 1939/40. In 1938-39 she served as Chairman of the National League of Young Liberals. In 1938 she advocated that all countries colonies should be handed over to the League of Nations and run through a colonial service as a first step on a path to independence. In May 1939 she condemned the Chamberlain Government's betrayal of the democracies of Spain and Czechoslovakia. In 1939 she became President of the National League of Young Liberals, serving through the Second world War. In the early 1940s, she was an advocate of global federalism. She served as Chairman of the Federal Union from 1941–45. She edited the group's paper, Federal News, from 1944–6. She contested Devizes again in 1945. With the country swinging to Labour, she dropped to third place.

Josephy was an advocate of both European and World Federalism. In 1947 at the first World Federalism Congress, she said, “Being British, I am not particularly interested in theory and not at all in philosophy,” and noted that if world government did not happen soon, it never would. She later worked at the Assembly of the Western European Union, which existed to develop a common defence policy for Europe. She was also a member of the European Union of Federalists' central committee from 1946 until her death. In 1949 she attended the European Assembly at Strasbourg as an observer. She was a member of the Liberal party national executive. She contested Cambridge in 1950. This was not a good prospect for the Liberals as they had not contested the seat since 1934 and had not won since 1906.

She contested Cambridge again in 1951.

From the mid-1950s, she worked as a reviser for the Assembly of Western European Union in Paris for nine years.

=== Electoral record ===
1928 London County Council election: St Marylebone
Party	Candidate	Votes	%	±%
Municipal Reform	Ernest Sanger	9,029		
Municipal Reform	Adeline Mary Roberts	8,988		
Labour	Nils Henry Moller	2,319		
Labour	Lillian Augusta Dawson	2,310		
Liberal	Harcourt Johnstone	1,514		n/a
Liberal	Frances Louise Josephy	1,431		n/a
Independent	John Struthers	88		n/a
Municipal Reform hold		Swing		
Municipal Reform hold		Swing		

General election 1929: Winchester
Party	Candidate	Votes	%	±%
Unionist	George Richard James Hennessy	17,560	44.8	−12.4
Labour	Robert Arthur Lyster	14,326	36.6	+5.3
Liberal	Frances Louise Josephy	7,278	18.6	+7.1
Majority		3,234	8.2	−17.7
Turnout		39,164	74.6	+2.8
Registered electors		52,522		
Unionist hold		Swing	−8.9	

General Election 1931: Basingstoke
Party	Candidate	Votes	%	±%
Conservative	Viscount Lymington	23,523	69.7	+19.3
Liberal	Frances Louise Josephy	6,106	18.1	−17.3
Labour	Charles Alexander Goatcher	4,124	12.2	−2.0
Majority		17,417	51.6	+36.6
Turnout		33,753	67.44	−6.8
Conservative hold		Swing	+18.3	

General Election 1935: Devizes
Party	Candidate	Votes	%	±%
Conservative	Sir Percy Angier Hurd	14,438	59.32	−6.95
Liberal	Frances Louise Josephy	9,903	40.68	+6.95
Majority		4,535	18.64	−13.90
Turnout		24,341	72.20	
Conservative hold		Swing	-6.95	

General Election 1945: Devizes
Party	Candidate	Votes	%	±%
Conservative	Maurice Christopher Hollis	12,796	47.0	−12.3
Labour	Wilfrid Edward Cave	8,120	29.9	n/a
Liberal	Frances Louise Josephy	6,278	23.1	−17.6
Majority		4,676	17.2	−1.5
Turnout		27,194	67.6	−4.6
Conservative hold		Swing	n/a	

General Election 1950: Cambridge
Party	Candidate	Votes	%	±%
Conservative	Hamilton William Kerr	25,151	49.51	+0.39
Labour	Arthur Leslie Symonds	20,297	39.95	−10.93
Liberal	Frances Louise Josephy	5,355	10.54	n/a
Majority		4,854	9.56	
Turnout		50,83	86.48	+17.32
Conservative gain from Labour		Swing	+5.66	

General Election 1951: Cambridge
Party	Candidate	Votes	%	±%
Conservative	Hamilton William Kerr	26,570	52.39	+2.88
Labour	Arthur Leslie Symonds	20,893	41.19	+1.24
Liberal	Frances Louise Josephy	3,257	6.42	−4.12
Majority		5,677	11.19	+1.64
Turnout		50,720	84.44	−2.04
Conservative hold		Swing	+0.82	

== Travel Photography ==
Frances Josephy (or ‘Jo’ Josephy to her friends) was an avid amateur photographer who travelled extensively and documented her trips using 35mm slide film. Her slide collection was donated to the National Art Slide Library (NASL) at the Victoria & Albert Museum by a Miss M H Borman, the executor of Josephy's estate, in 1987. The collection boasts approximately 3,400 slides and documents Josephy’s travels over a span of twenty years (from 1956-1976) and over 20 different countries.

The NASL collection later moved to Leicester Polytechnic, now De Montfort University, in the 1990s.
