= 1932 Richmond (Surrey) by-election =

UK Parliamentary by-election

The 1932 Richmond-upon-Thames by-election was held on 13 April 1932. The by-election was held due to the resignation of the incumbent Conservative MP, Newton Moore. It was won by the Conservative candidate William Ray.
