= Hackney Central (London County Council constituency) =

London County Council constituency

- Former constituency for the London County Council

Former constituency
- Created: 1889; 1955
- Abolished: 1949; 1965
- Members: 2 (to 1949); 3 (from 1949)

Hackney Central was a constituency used for elections to the London County Council between 1889 and 1949, and again from 1955 until the council's abolition, in 1965. The seat shared boundaries with the UK Parliament constituency of the same name.

== Councillors ==
Year	Name	Party	Name	Party
1889	John Lowles	Moderate	Walter Johnston	Moderate
1892	Edward Pickersgill	Progressive	McKinnon Wood	Progressive
1895	Frederick William Maude	Progressive	McKinnon Wood	Progressive
1898	James Stuart	Progressive	McKinnon Wood	Progressive
1901	Alfred James Shepheard	Progressive	McKinnon Wood	Progressive
1907	George Billings	Municipal Reform	William Burton Stewart	Municipal Reform
1910	Henrietta Adler	Progressive	Alfred James Shepheard	Progressive
1913	Henrietta Adler	Progressive	William Ray	Municipal Reform
1925	Humfrey Henry Edmunds	Municipal Reform	William Ray	Municipal Reform
1928	Henrietta Adler	Liberal	William Ray	Municipal Reform
1931	Montague Moustardier	Municipal Reform	William Ray	Municipal Reform
1934	Bernard Homa	Labour	Mary O'Brien Harris	Labour
1938	Bernard Homa	Labour	Peggy Jay	Labour
1949	Constituency abolished			

Year	Name	Party	Name	Party	Name	Party
1955	Hilary Halpin	Labour	Mary Ormerod	Labour	John Wobey	Labour
1958	Harry Rezler	Labour	Mary Ormerod	Labour	John Wobey	Labour
1961	Harry Rezler	Labour	Ellis Hillman	Labour	Lou Sherman	Labour

== Election results ==
=== 1889 to 1949 ===
1889 London County Council election: Hackney Central
Party	Candidate	Votes	%	±%
Moderate	John Lowles	1,764		
Moderate	Walter Johnston	1,602		
Progressive	Richard Martin	1,455		
Progressive	Alfred Bowser	1,362		
Moderate win (new seat)				
Moderate win (new seat)				

1892 London County Council election: Hackney Central
Party	Candidate	Votes	%	±%
Progressive	Edward Pickersgill	2,738		
Progressive	McKinnon Wood	2,643		
Moderate	Walter Johnston	2,208		
Moderate	John Lowles	2,197		
Progressive gain from Moderate		Swing		
Progressive gain from Moderate		Swing		

1895 London County Council election: Hackney Central
Party	Candidate	Votes	%	±%
Progressive	McKinnon Wood	2,473		
Progressive	Frederick William Maude	2,449		
Moderate	Walter Johnston	2,152		
Moderate	Seymour Fitzroy Ormsby-Gore	2,041		
Progressive hold		Swing		
Progressive hold		Swing		

1898 London County Council election: Hackney Central
Party	Candidate	Votes	%	±%
Progressive	McKinnon Wood	3,162		
Progressive	James Stuart	3,125		
Moderate	T. B. Westacott	2,369		
Moderate	Claude Hay	2,291		
Progressive hold		Swing		
Progressive hold		Swing		

1901 London County Council election: Hackney Central
Party	Candidate	Votes	%	±%
Progressive	McKinnon Wood	3,355	33.5	+4.6
Progressive	Alfred James Shepheard	3,221	32.2	+3.7
Conservative	Stanley Johnson	1,742	17.4	−4.2
Conservative	George Cartwright	1,688	16.9	−4.0
Progressive hold		Swing		
Progressive hold		Swing	+4.1	

1904 London County Council election: Hackney Central
Party	Candidate	Votes	%	±%
Progressive	McKinnon Wood	3,534		
Progressive	Alfred James Shepheard	3,476		
Conservative	George Bingham	2,120		
Conservative	George Cartwright	2,097		
Majority				
Progressive hold		Swing		
Progressive hold		Swing		

1907 London County Council election: Hackney Central
Party	Candidate	Votes	%	±%
Municipal Reform	William Burton Stewart	3,722		
Municipal Reform	George Billings	3,659		
Progressive	W. B. Yates	3,559		
Progressive	Alfred James Shepheard	3,558		
Social Democratic Federation	Edwin C. Fairchild	296		
Social Democratic Federation	Victor Fisher	257		
Majority				
Municipal Reform gain from Progressive		Swing		
Municipal Reform gain from Progressive		Swing		

1910 London County Council election: Hackney Central
Party	Candidate	Votes	%	±%
Progressive	Alfred James Shepheard	3,634	27.5	
Progressive	Henrietta Adler	3,521	26.2	
Municipal Reform	G. J. Dowse	3,157	23.5	
Municipal Reform	John Foster Vesey-FitzGerald	3,053	22.8	
Majority		364	2.7	
Progressive gain from Municipal Reform		Swing		
Progressive gain from Municipal Reform		Swing		

1913 London County Council election: Hackney Central
Party	Candidate	Votes	%	±%
Municipal Reform	William Ray	3,670	25.2	+1.7
Progressive	Henrietta Adler	3,653	25.0	−1.2
Municipal Reform	William Cecil	3,645	25.0	+2.2
Progressive	Alfred James Shepheard	3,622	24.8	−2.7
Majority		8	0.0	
Progressive hold		Swing	-1.7	
Municipal Reform gain from Progressive		Swing	+2.2	

1919 London County Council election: Hackney Central
Party	Candidate	Votes	%	±%
Progressive	Henrietta Adler	Unopposed	n/a	n/a
Municipal Reform	William Ray	Unopposed	n/a	n/a
Progressive hold		Swing	n/a	
Municipal Reform hold		Swing	n/a	

1922 London County Council election: Hackney Central
Party	Candidate	Votes	%	±%
Progressive	Henrietta Adler	Unopposed	n/a	n/a
Municipal Reform	William Ray	Unopposed	n/a	n/a
Progressive hold		Swing	n/a	
Municipal Reform hold		Swing	n/a	

1925 London County Council election: Hackney Central
Party	Candidate	Votes	%	±%
Municipal Reform	William Ray	4,878		n/a
Municipal Reform	Humphrey Edmunds	4,595		n/a
Labour	P. H. Black	3,299		n/a
Labour	J. H. Harley	3,183		n/a
Progressive	Henrietta Adler	2,759		n/a
Progressive	Arthur Mortimer	2,436		n/a
Municipal Reform gain from Progressive		Swing	n/a	
Municipal Reform hold		Swing	n/a	

1928 London County Council election: Hackney Central
Party	Candidate	Votes	%	±%
Municipal Reform	William Ray	5,092		
Liberal	Henrietta Adler	5,008		
Municipal Reform	John David Gathorne-Hardy	4,960		
Liberal	George James Lusher-Pentney	4,820		
Labour	Amy Sayle	2,743		
Labour	H. W. Butler	2,737		
Independent Labour	S. L. Alexander	625		n/a
Independent Labour	J. W. Head	593		n/a
Liberal gain from Municipal Reform		Swing		
Municipal Reform hold		Swing		

1931 London County Council election: Hackney Central
Party	Candidate	Votes	%	±%
Municipal Reform	William Ray	5,468		
Municipal Reform	Montague Moustardier	5,224		
Labour	Bernard Homa	3,715		
Labour	Mary O'Brien Harris	3,672		
Liberal	Henrietta Adler	2,774		
Liberal	H. Baily	2,324		
Municipal Reform gain from Liberal		Swing		
Municipal Reform hold		Swing		

1934 London County Council election: Hackney Central
Party	Candidate	Votes	%	±%
Labour	Bernard Homa	6,322		
Labour	Mary O'Brien Harris	6,262		
Municipal Reform	Montague Moustardier	5,216		
Municipal Reform	F. Rye	5,142		
Labour gain from Municipal Reform		Swing		
Labour gain from Municipal Reform		Swing		

1937 London County Council election: Hackney Central
Party	Candidate	Votes	%	±%
Labour	Bernard Homa	8,996		
Labour	Mary O'Brien Harris	8,846		
Municipal Reform	Montague Moustardier	6,450		
Municipal Reform	C. Fisher Yates	6,349		
Liberal	A. H. Jenkins	544		
Liberal	George Page	504		
Labour hold		Swing		
Labour hold		Swing		

Hackney Central by-election, 1938
Party	Candidate	Votes	%	±%
Labour	Peggy Jay	5,640		
Municipal Reform	Montague Moustardier	4,269		
Labour hold		Swing		

1946 London County Council election: Hackney Central
Party	Candidate	Votes	%	±%
Labour	Bernard Homa	5,810		
Labour	Peggy Jay	5,733		
Conservative	Montague Moustardier	2,193		
Conservative	W. H. Bishop	2,178		
Labour hold		Swing		
Labour hold		Swing		

=== 1955 to 1965 ===
1955 London County Council election: Hackney Central
Party	Candidate	Votes	%	±%
Labour	Hilary Halpin	9,040		
Labour	Mary Ormerod	9,035		
Labour	John Wobey	8,971		
Conservative	T. A. Lovelock	4,302		
Conservative	J. Pritchard	4,215		
Conservative	V. French	4,051		
Communist	John Betteridge	855		
Communist	Morrie Blaston	848		
Communist	S. Kilbey	846		
Labour hold		Swing		
Labour hold		Swing		
Labour hold		Swing		

1958 London County Council election: Hackney Central
Party	Candidate	Votes	%	±%
Labour	Mary Ormerod	8,811		
Labour	Harry Rezler	8,462		
Labour	John Wobey	8,455		
Conservative	L. Hegerty	2,620		
Conservative	J. R. Holmes	2,549		
Conservative	J. R. Pritchard	2,537		
Labour hold		Swing		
Labour hold		Swing		
Labour hold		Swing		

1961 London County Council election: Hackney Central
Party	Candidate	Votes	%	±%
Labour	Ellis Hillman	9,099		
Labour	Harry Rezler	9,075		
Labour	Lou Sherman	9,037		
Conservative	H. M. L. Morton	4,442		
Conservative	B. M. Edwards	4,351		
Conservative	K. J. T. Ashbourne	4,328		
Labour hold		Swing		
Labour hold		Swing		
Labour hold		Swing		
