= John Arnold Baker =

British judge and Liberal Party politician

His Honour John Arnold Baker DL (5 November 1925 – 13 June 2016) was a British judge and a Liberal Party politician.

== Background ==
Baker was born in Calcutta the son of William Sydney Baker, MC and Hilda Dora Swiss. He was educated at Plymouth College, Wellington School, Somerset and Wadham College, Oxford where he received a Master of Arts. In 1954 he married Edith Muriel Joy Heward. They had two daughters. In 1986 he was appointed a Deputy Lieutenant for Surrey.

== Professional career ==
In 1943 at the age of 18 Baker joined the Royal Naval Volunteer Reserve. After university in 1951 he was admitted as a solicitor. In 1955 he had published 'The Young Lawyer' written with J. L. Clay and John Beeching Frankenburg. In 1960 he received a Call to the Bar, by Gray's Inn. In 1972 he became a Recorder. In 1973 he became a Circuit Judge. He retired in 1998 at the age of 73. In 1986 he became President of the Medico-Legal Society, serving for two years.

== Political career ==
At University Baker got active in politics and was treasurer of the Oxford Union from 1947 to 1948. He joined the Liberal Party and was active in the party's youth wing. In 1952 he became chairman of the National League of Young Liberals, serving a one-year term. He also became active in the senior party at a national level. He was elected a member of the Liberal Party National Executive. He was Liberal candidate for the Richmond division of Surrey at the 1959 General Election;

General Election 1959: Richmond (Surrey)
Party	Candidate	Votes	%	±%
Conservative	Anthony Royle	27,161	57.19	
Labour	Charles H Archibald	12,975	27.32	
Liberal	John Baker	7,359	15.49	
Majority		14,186	29.87	
Turnout			79.35	

He was again Liberal candidate for the Richmond division of Surrey at the 1964 General Election;

General Election 1964: Richmond (Surrey)
Party	Candidate	Votes	%	±%
Conservative	Anthony Royle	22,203	50.40	
Labour	Alan Brownjohn	14,053	31.90	
Liberal	John Baker	7,800	17.70	
Majority		8,150	18.50	
Turnout			76.46	

He did not contest the 1966 General election. In 1968 he became a Vice-President of the Liberal Party. In 1969 he was elected Chairman of the Liberal Party National Executive. He was Liberal candidate for the Dorking division of Surrey at the 1970 General Election.

General Election 1970: Dorking
Party	Candidate	Votes	%	±%
Conservative	George Sinclair	25,393	59.0	+5.2
Labour	W. John Fahy	10,523	24.5	−3.9
Liberal	John Baker	7,103	16.5	−1.3
Majority		14,870	34.6	
Turnout		43,019	72	
Conservative hold		Swing	+4.6	

He did not stand for parliament again. He was involved with the Apex Trust becoming a Trustee in 2002 and a Patron in 2006.

In 2005 his memoirs entitled 'Ballot Box to Jury Box' were published. Baker died in June 2016 at the age of 90.

Party political offices
Preceded by Gruffydd Evans	Chairman of the Liberal Party Executive; 1968–1969	Succeeded by Position merged into Chairman of the Liberal Party
