= 1898 London County Council election =

Local election in England

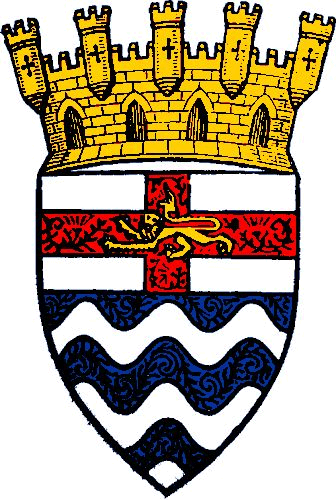
- 3 March 1898
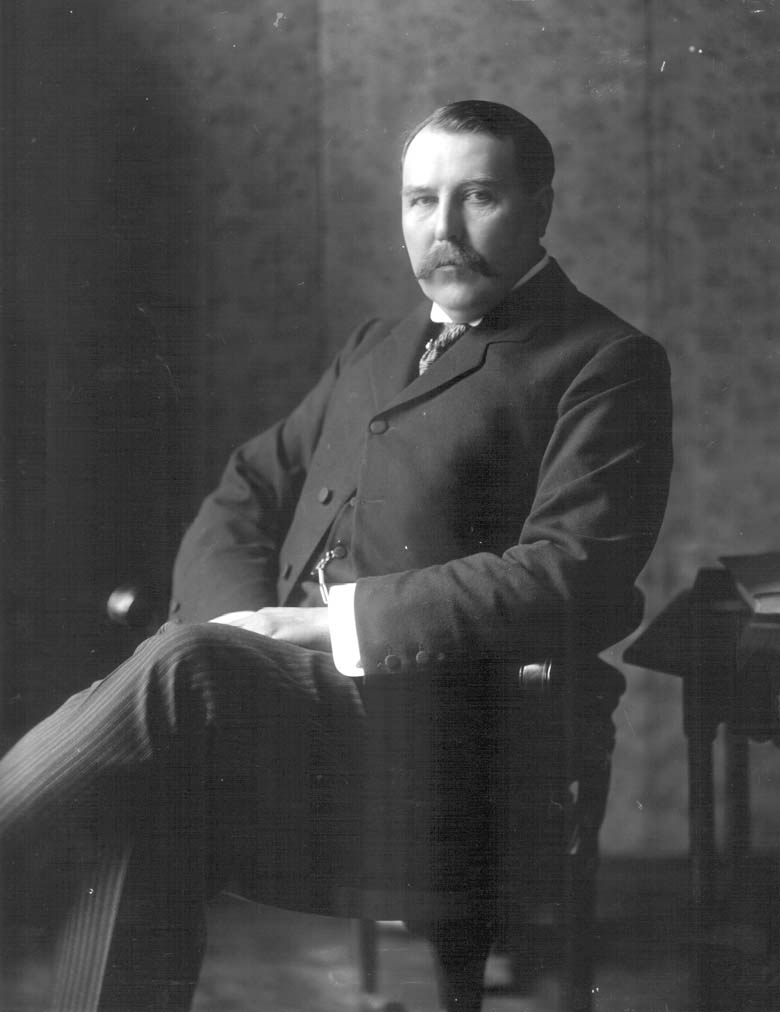

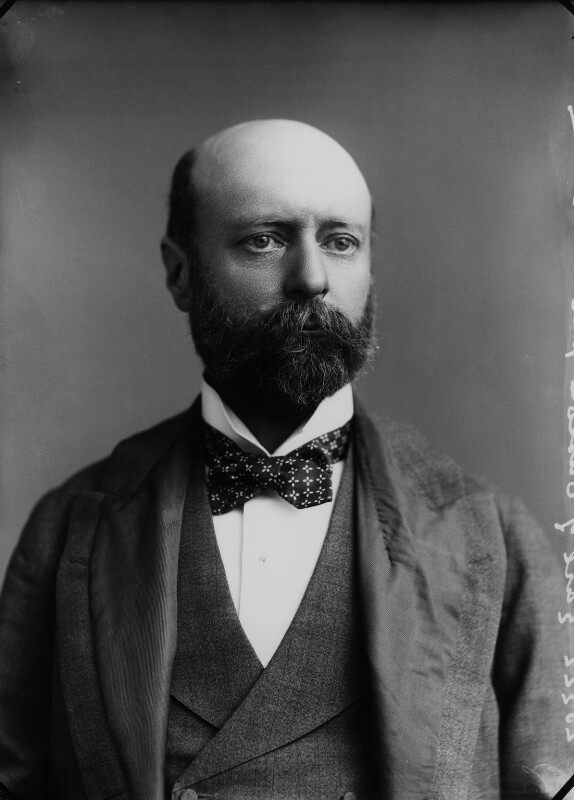
	First party	Second party
Leader	McKinnon Wood	Earl of Onslow
Party	Progressive	Moderate
Leader's seat	Alderman	Alderman
Seats won	70	48
Seat change	▲11	▼11
Popular vote	150,826	148,576
Percentage	49.2%	48.4%

An election to the County Council of London took place on 3 March 1898. The council was elected by First Past the Post with each elector having two votes in the two-member seats. The Progressive Party won a substantial majority on the council.

== Campaign ==
The Progressives contended that, because the last election had resulted in a tie in the number of councillors, the council had made little progress over the past three years. They argued that they had successfully led slum clearance programmes. They proposed that the council should maintain its existing policy of refusing to sell alcohol in premises it owned, should seek to levy increased taxes on landlords, and should aim to municipalise the gas and water supplies.

The Moderates argued that the Progressives were fighting on party political lines, and that as a result, they would too. They contended that the Progressives wanted to adopt socialist policies, and that they had wasted money by overspending on building projects. Instead, the Moderates advocated passing the majority of the council's responsibilities to the Metropolitan Borough Councils.

The election in Hackney Central was delayed, due to the death of one of the candidates.

== Result ==
The Progressive Party gained 16 seats from the Moderates and lost only 4 seats to them, winning a substantial majority. The Times noted that this was less than their majority in the 1892 London County Council election, and did not necessarily mean that the voters of London would support the Liberal Party at the next UK general election.

Party	Votes			Seats	
Party	Number	%	Stood	Seats	%
Progressive	150,826	49.2	112	70	
Moderate	148,576	48.4	114	48	
Independent	4,681	0.8	5	0	
Independent Labour			4	0	
Ind. Labour Party			3	0	
Social Democratic Federation			2	0	
