= Felix Dodds =

British author, futurist and activist

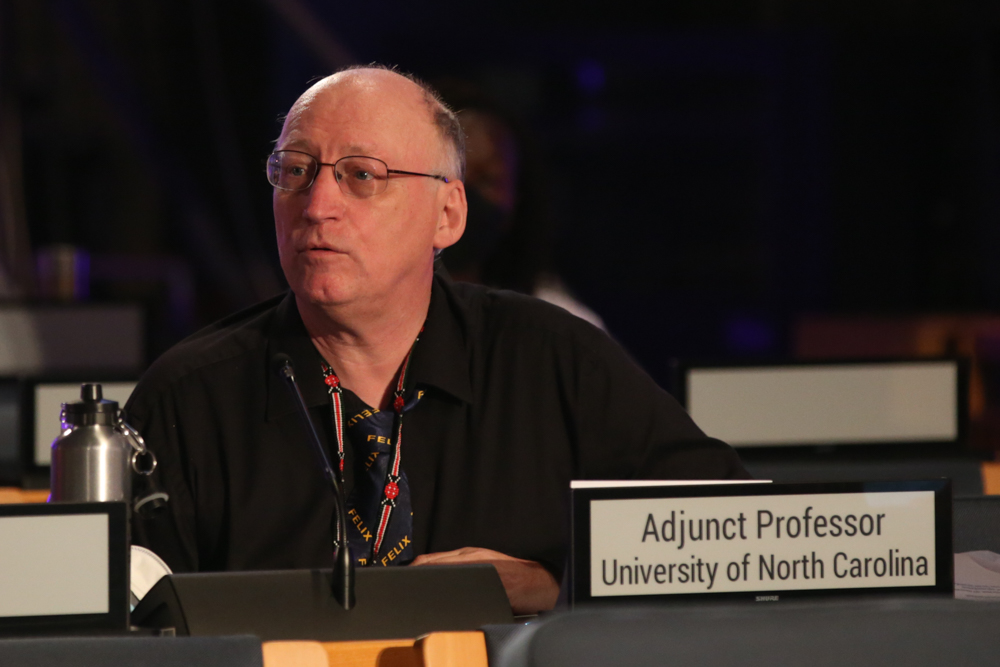
- Felix Dodds at UNEA 5.2 in 2022, courtesy ENB/IISD
- Occupation: Author
- Website: felixdodds.net

Felix Dodds, born Michael Nicholas Dodds, is a British author, futurist, and activist.

He has written more than two dozens books, mostly on environmental issues, sustainable development, and international relations. From 1992-2012, Dodds served as Executive Director of Stakeholder Forum for Our Common Future, a non-profit organisation with consultative status to the UN Economic and Social Council. In 2010, Green Eco Services listed him as one of the twenty-five environmentalists ahead of their time.

== Early years ==
Dodds was born in Allestree in Derby, UK. He studied physics at the University of Surrey, where he was active in student politics. He was involved in the Anti-Apartheid Movement and the Surrey Students Union, for which he was Deputy President between 1977 and 1978. After university, Dodds went on to teach mathematics and physics, first at the Khartoum International Community School, and then in London at the Harlington Community School.

== Political work (1980–1990) ==
Early in his career, Dodds was active in UK politics and involved with the Anti-Apartheid Movement and the Anti-Nazi League. Dodds also engaged with environmental issues such as acid rain, nuclear power and ozone depletion. He held positions in the British Liberal Party between 1983 and 1987 and became chairperson of the party's "young wing," the National League of Young Liberals (NLYL), in 1985.

Dodds was an instigator in the rebellion against the SDP-Liberal Alliance leadership of David Steel and David Owen over the issue of an independent nuclear deterrence. The rebel group produced the publication Across the Divide: Liberal Values on Defence and Disarmament, which outlined the Liberal Party's historic opposition to the UK having an independent nuclear deterrent. This resulted in a defeat to the leadership in 1986, by twenty-three votes at the Liberal Party Conference defence debate in Eastbourne.

In 1988, Dodds co-founded Green Voice, which worked for two years to create a dialogue between Green members on the left of UK politics. In 2018, he published his autobiography about those years: Power to the People: Confessions of a Young Liberal Activist 1975–1988.

== United Nations and writing career (1990–present) ==
In 1990, Dodds became active within the United Nations network, originally as director of the United Nations Environment and Development, UK Committee (UNED-UK), and later as head of the Stakeholder Forum for a Sustainable Future. During this time, he wrote many articles and books, mostly about the UN, sustainable development and the environment. Dodds has also been involved in academia, including serving as an Adjunct Professor at the Water Institute, University of North Carolina.

From 1997 to 2001, Dodds co-chaired the NGO coalition at the UN Commission on Sustainable Development. He is credited with proposing to the UN General Assembly in 1996 the introduction of Stakeholder Dialogues at the United Nations.

Dodds has also advised the European Union, the governments of Denmark, and the UK at intergovernmental events.

As well as authoring or co-authoring numerous books on sustainable development and the environment, Dodds has also written extensively for various news outlets, particularly the Inter-Press Service. This includes articles on the UN climate change negotiations, sustainable development, and other issues relating to the UN and international relations.
