= Clifford Edgar =

British politician (1857–1931)

Clifford Blackburn Edgar

MP for Richmond (Surrey)
- In office 1918–1922

Personal details
- Born: 1857
- Died: 20 March 1931 (aged 73–74)
- Political party: Conservative

Clifford Blackburn Edgar (1857 – 20 March 1931) was a Coalition Conservative MP for Richmond in Surrey. He won the seat in 1918, but lost it to an Independent Unionist in 1922.

== Biography ==
Educated at the University of Manchester (BSc) and the University of London (MusB), Edgar was involved with West African development for half a century, being a director of the Bank of British West Africa. He was a member of Surrey County Council and also Mayor of the Municipal Borough of Richmond (Surrey).

A photographic portrait of him was taken by Walter Stoneman in 1921; that portrait is now in the collection of the National Portrait Gallery, London.

Parliament of the United Kingdom
Preceded by Constituency created	Member of Parliament for Richmond (Surrey); 1918–1922	Succeeded by Harry Becker

== Sources ==
- Whitaker's Almanack, 1919 to 1922 editions
- British Parliamentary Election Results 1918–1949, compiled and edited by F.W.S. Craig (The Macmillan Press 1977)
