= National League of Young Liberals =

1903–1990 youth wing of the British Liberal Party

- Founded: 1903
- Dissolved: 2 March 1988
- Merged into: Liberal Democrat Youth and Students
- Headquarters: Offices at the National Liberal Club, 1 Whitehall Place, London
- Ideology: Liberalism (British); Radicalism; Factions; Classical liberalism Social liberalism Libertarian socialism Communism (Note: The Terrell Report, initiated by Jeremy Thorpe, alleged that some members of the Young Liberals were communists.)
- Mother party: Liberal Party
- International affiliation: International Federation of Liberal and Radical Youth (IFLRY)
- European affiliation: European Liberal Youth (LYMEC)

National League of Young Liberals (NLYL), often just called the Young Liberals, was the youth wing of the British Liberal Party. It was in existence from 1903 to 1990. Together with the party's student wing, the Union of Liberal Students (ULS), the organisations made up the Young Liberal Movement. In 1988, the ULS merged with the Social Democratic Party's own student wing, and in 1990 the youth and student sections themselves merged to form Liberal Democrat Youth and Students (LDYS). It was renamed Liberal Youth in Spring 2008, and then as Young Liberals in December 2016. The NLYL played a significant role in the development of Liberal thought and action, particularly from the 1960s until the end of the 1980s.

== Early years ==
The NLYL was founded in 1903. By 1906, it had over three hundred branches.

In 1934, the NLYL called for David Lloyd George to lead a Liberal New Deal revival, based on the Yellow Book.

== "Red Guard" ==
One of the significant periods of the Young Liberals was the 1960s and early 1970s. The press coined the phrase the "Red Guard" to illustrate the radical nature of the youth wing. The public became aware of the "Red Guards" at the 1966 Liberal Party Conference in Brighton, when they sponsored an anti-NATO resolution. Over the next decade the YLs were active on a number of foreign policy areas. In particular they were at the forefront of the opposition to Apartheid and the Vietnam War. The YLs took a leading role in the Stop the Seventy Tour of South African Cricket and Rugby teams. Led in particular by an exiled South African, Peter Hain (later to become a Labour Party Cabinet Minister), Louis Eaks (later to an editor of Tribune), and Hilary Wainwright (future editor of Red Pepper magazine), they took direct action when other Liberals were not doing so.

The party leadership were very unhappy about the antics of their youth wing, and party leader Jeremy Thorpe set up a three-man commission, which produced the Terrell Report. The report accused some of the Young Liberals of being communists. Many Young Liberals described themselves as "libertarian socialists". Peter Hain explained:

"Underlying libertarian socialism is a different and distinct notion of politics which rests on the belief that it is only through interaction with others in political activity and civic action that individuals will fully realise their humanity. Democracy should therefore extend not simply to government but throughout society: in industry, in the neighbourhood or in any arrangement by which people organise their lives."

Thorpe went on to try to stop the election of Peter Hain as chair of the Young Liberals.

At the same time as being active on foreign policy, a group of Young Liberals led by Bernard Greaves, Tony Greaves (later to become a Liberal Democrat peer), Gordon Lishman and David Penhaligon (later to become a Liberal MP) developed the combination of a radical YL approach and involvement in their communities. The Young Liberals put forward an amendment to the party's strategy at the Liberal Party Conference in Eastbourne in 1970 which was passed with little enthusiasm from the Party leadership. The amendment defined the new strategy as:

a dual approach to politics, acting both inside and outside the institutions of the political establishment to help organise people in their communities to take and use power to build a Liberal power-base in the major cities of this country to identify with the under-privileged in this country and the world to capture people's imagination as a credible political movement, with local roots and local successes.

This was to revolutionise the party, and was known as "community politics". Young Liberals started to show by example how community politics could win elections, first with by-election wins in 1972 (notably with YL vice-chair Graham Tope's win at Sutton and Cheam) and then through the work of Trevor Jones and his colleagues in Liverpool, where they won control of the council. In 1977, there were some 750 Liberal councillors. By 1985, that figure had risen to more than 2,500, and it peaked in the early 1990s at more than 5,000. However, it was only with the election of Paddy Ashdown in 1988 that community politics was fully embraced by the party leadership.

It was Young Liberal chairman Ruth Addison who led the revolt against David Steel's call in 1974 for a government of national unity.

As a result, the NLYL grew stronger, attracting groups to affiliate from surprising areas like rural Wiltshire. Patrick Coleman went on to be a county councillor. However, it also eventually led some to reject the merger of the Liberal Party with the SDP in 1988–1989 to form the Liberal Democrats. Some walked away into political limbo, some joined Michael Meadowcroft in a breakaway Liberal Party, but they had no parliamentary representation. Meadowcroft joined the Liberal Democrats in September 2007.

== "Green Guard" ==
In 1979, the Liberal Party adopted a "no growth" economic policy and became a magnet for young people interested in green politics. Initially led by Felix Dodds, the Young Liberals again challenged the party on a number of fronts. On foreign policy, they not only continued the tradition of the "Red Guard" in opposing the US escalation of nuclear tension, the introduction of Star Wars and the UK's independent nuclear deterrent, and continued to campaign against apartheid, but also started to green the party through both local activities and national campaigns on acid rain, nuclear power and green economics. Michael Harskin, one of the Green Guard, crafted the NLYL manifesto and the attack on the Liberal-SDP Alliance manifesto for the 1983 election. He said:

it offers no radical vision for young people and little evidence of Liberal policies on Northern Ireland, the environment and other issues YLs had fought to be adopted.

The party leadership were not happy, and when a delegation of Young Liberals met Gerry Adams to ask him to take his seat in parliament, party leader David Steel attacked them for bringing the party into disrepute. The Young Liberals went on to persuade the party to support the withdrawal of all British troops from Northern Ireland as a long-term aim.

The Young Liberals played a significant role in persuading Des Wilson, the then outgoing President of Friends of the Earth International, to become active again in the Liberal Party. Wilson went on to become party president in 1986. In an echo of the "Red Guard" era, the party leadership under David Steel campaigned to stop the election of Felix Dodds to the position of National Chair of the Young Liberals in 1984. Although not elected that year, he was elected the following year and played a significant role, as did the Young Liberals as whole, in helping to organise the rebellion for the 1986 Eastbourne Defence Debate.

The most significant impact of this period was perhaps the rebellion the Young Liberals helped to facilitate against the SDP-Liberal Alliance leadership of David Steel and David Owen over the issue of an independent nuclear deterrent. The rebel coalition, which included three MPs - Simon Hughes, Archie Kirkwood and Michael Meadowcroft - produced the publication Across the Divide: Liberal Values on Defence and Disarmament, which outlined the Liberal Party's historic opposition to the UK having an independent nuclear deterrent. This resulted in a major defeat to the leadership in 1986, by twenty-three votes (652 votes to 625) at the Liberal Party Conference defence debate in Eastbourne. Many believe that the speech by Simon Hughes won the day for the rebels:

Fellow Liberals, we could change the direction of British defence and disarmament policy. But we are a party. Many of us joined this party because of its aim and its goal: a non-nuclear Europe in a non-nuclear world. We have never voted to replace independent nuclear deterrent. Not only must we not do so now, but our policy must be to do so never - and to replace an independent British nuclear deterrent by a European nuclear deterrent - even if that concept was workable - is not an acceptable alternative.... We are on the verge of responsibility. There's no more important subject - the battle is not between us, the battle is for our future. I urge you to accept both amendments and the resolution and be proud of all that we stand for. [applause; standing ovation]

In his final speech as chair of the Young Liberals, Dodds called for "a rainbow alliance on the left in British politics". In 1988, he and other Young Liberals formed an informal alliance with leading Green Party members Tim Cooper, Jean Lambert and Liz Crosbie called Green Voice. This alliance investigated how they might be better relations and campaigns joining together members of both parties. The two Green Voice Conferences in 1988 played a key role in enabling leading MPs Simon Hughes and Michael Meadowcroft to outline to the new Social and Liberal Democratic Party the kind of green agenda that the new party should adopt. Hughes, at the press conference for the first Green Voice Conference, announced that he would not join the new Social and Liberal Democrats Party unless it was to accept a strong green agenda. In 2018, Felix Dodds published his autobiography about the Green Guards, Power to the People: Confessions of a Young Liberal Activist 1975-1987.

Some of those associated with the Green Guard, including Martin Horwood and Adrian Sanders, have gone on to become MPs, and others, including Edward Lucas, Felix Dodds and Stephen Grey, have become journalists and authors on international issues. Others have been active in the Liberal Democrat party communications department, and at 10 Downing Street (during the Coalition government) such as Olly Grender and Carina Trimingham (Chris Huhne's press and media agent). Others chose to take green politics to a local level and lead by example, such as Mike Cooper, who became Leader of Sutton Borough Council, and Louise Bloom, a member of the London Assembly.

== List of chairs of the National League of Young Liberals ==
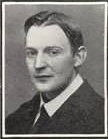
Masterman

Griffith

From	To	Name
1906	1907	Charles Masterman
1907	1914	Charles Prescott
1914	1915	George Henry Parkin
1915	1926	Frank Thornborough
1926	1928	Kingsley Griffith
1928	1933	Elliott Dodds
1933	1938	Vernon Baxter
1938	1939	Frances Josephy
?	?	Edward Anthony Brooke Fletcher
1947	1949	Henry William Sparham
1951	1952	John Frankenburg
1952	1953	John Baker
1953	1954	?
1954	1955	Roy Douglas
?	?	Ivan Harvey Lester
1956	1958	Barbara Sybel Burwell
1958	1960	Timothy Joyce
1960	1961	Gruff Evans
1961	1962	?
1962	1964	John Griffiths
1964	1965	?
1965	1966	Jon Steel
1966	1968	George Kiloh
1968	1968	Malcolm MacCallum
1969	1970	Louis Eaks
1970	1971	Tony Greaves
1971	1973	Peter Hain
1973	1975	Ruth Addison
1975	1977	Steve Atack
1977	1978	Patrick Coleman
1978	1980	Alan Sherwell
1980	1981	John Leston
1981	1983	Sue Younger Ross
1983	1985	Janice Turner
1985	1987	Felix Dodds
1987	1989	Rachael Pitchford
1989	1990	Jane Brophy

== List of presidents ==
- 1906–190? Lewis Harcourt
- 190?–1908 Franklin Thomasson
- 1908-1909 David Lloyd George
- 1909–1926 Walter Runciman
- 1926–1927 Sir Harry Verney
- 1927–1932 Frank Kingsley Griffith
- 1932–1938 Elliott Dodds
- 1938-1939 Vernon Baxter
- 1939-194? Frances Josephy
- 1946–1948 Emrys Roberts
- 1948–1949 Douglas Eugene Moore
- 1953–1954 Viscount Samuel
- 1954–1955 Philip Fothergill
- 1959–1961 Ludovic Kennedy
- 1976-1977 Peter Hain
- 1979–1980 David Alton
- 1984–1985 Des Wilson
- 1985-1986 Hunter S. Thompson
- 1986–1988 Simon Hughes

== Prominent former Young Liberals ==
- Michael Foot, Leader of the Labour Party, 1980–1983
- Sir Lawrence Freedman, Professor of War Studies at King's College London
- Stephen Grey, journalist, author of Ghost Plane: The True Story of the CIA Torture Program
- Peter Hain, Labour Cabinet Minister, 2002–2008
- Megan Lloyd George, the first female Member of Parliament for a Welsh constituency and Deputy Leader of the Liberal Party. She later became a Labour MP.
- Harold Wilson, Leader of the Labour Party, 1963–1976 and Prime Minister of the United Kingdom, 1964–1970 and 1974–1976
- Elliott Dodds, Chairman of the Unservile State Group
- Felix Dodds, author of 17 books on sustainable development and Chair of the United Nations Conference (2011) Sustainable Societies - Responsible Citizens. In 2018, he published his autobiography Power to the People: Confessions of a Young Liberal Activists (1975-1987).

== Sources ==
- Dodds, E., (1919) Is Liberalism Dead?
- Dodds, E., (1922) Liberalism in Action
- Dodds, E., (1926) The Social Gospel of Liberalism
- Dodds, E., (1947) The Defence of Man
- Dodds, F., (Ed.) (1984) Six Essays in Search of an Identity, NLYL, London
- Dodds, F., MP Hughes, S. MP Kirkwood, A., MP Meadowcroft, M., et al. (1986), Across the Divide: Liberal Values on Defence and Disarmament Hebden Bridge
- Dodds, F., (Ed.),(1988) Into the 21st Century - An Agenda for Political Realignment, London: Green Print
- Dodds, F. (2018) Power to the People: Confessions of a Young Liberal Activists 1975-1988, Apex, New World Frontiers
- Eaks, L. (1988) From El Salvador to the Libyan Jamahiriya: A Radical Review of American Foreign Policy under the Reagan Administration, London: Third World Reports
- Greaves, F., B.,(1971), Scarborough Perspective NLYL, London
- Hain, P., (1971)Don't Play with Apartheid: Background to the Stop the Seventy Tour Campaign, Allen & U ISBN 0-00-000000-0
- Hain, P., (1973) Radical Liberalism and Youth Politics Liberal Publications Department ISBN 0-900520-36-1
- Hain, P., (1975)Radical Regeneration Quartet Books ISBN 0-7043-1231-X
- Hain, P., (1976) Mistaken Identity: The Wrong Face of the Law Quartet Books ISBN 0-7043-3116-0
- Hain, P., (Ed.) (1976) Community Politics Calder Publications Ltd ISBN 0-7145-3543-5
- Hain, P., Hebditch, S., (1978) Radicals and Socialism Institute for Workers' Control ISBN 0-901740-55-1
- Hain, P. (2010) Mandela, Spruce, London
- Hain, P. (2015) The Hain Diaries, Biteback Publishing, London
- Pitchford, R., and Greaves, T., (1989) Merger: The Inside Story Liberal Renewal
