= Anthony Royle, Baron Fanshawe of Richmond =

British Conservative politician and businessman (1927–2001)

The Right Honourable The Lord Fanshawe of Richmond KCMG
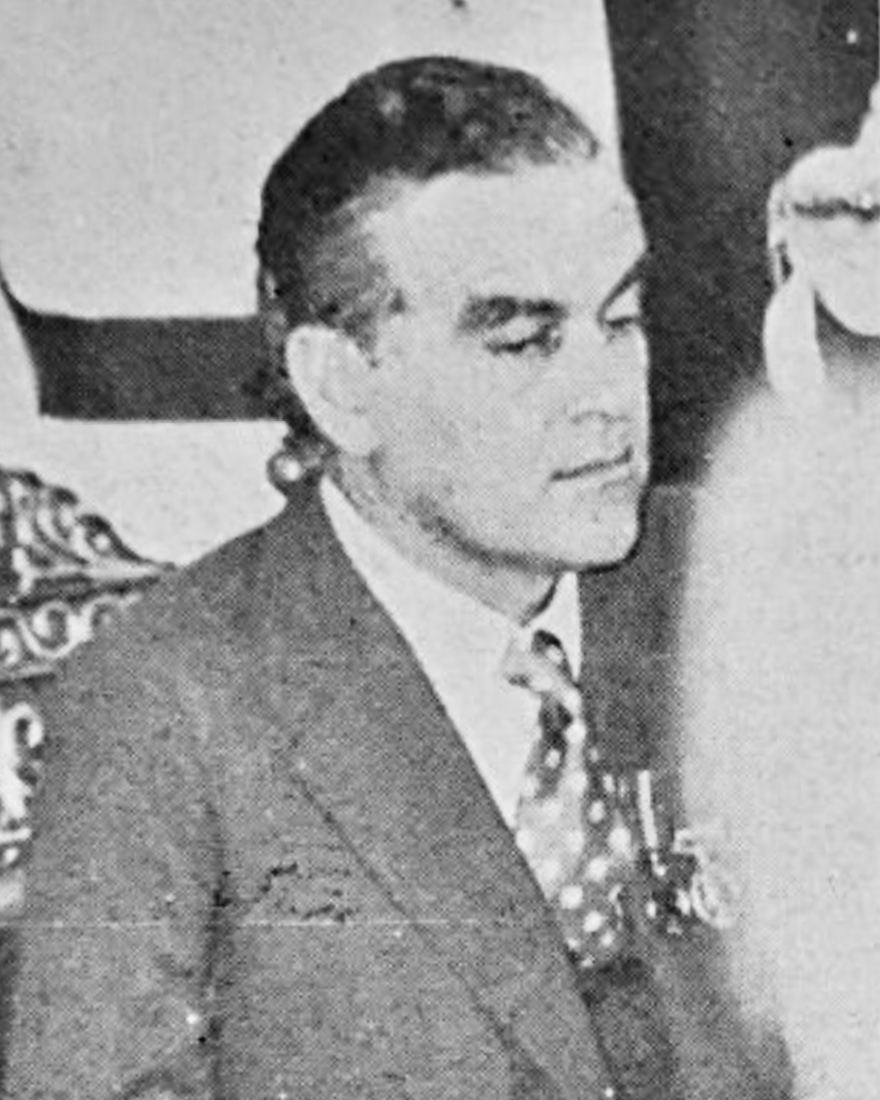
- Anthony in 1971

Member of Parliament for Richmond
- In office 8 October 1959 – 13 May 1983
- Preceded by: Sir George Harvie-Watt
- Succeeded by: Constituency abolished

Member of the House of Lords
- Lord Temporal
- Life peerage 27 September 1983 – 28 December 2001

Personal details
- Born: Anthony Henry Fanshawe Royle; 27 March 1927
- Died: 28 December 2001 (aged 74)
- Profession: Politician, businessman

Anthony Henry Fanshawe Royle, Baron Fanshawe of Richmond, KCMG (27 March 1927 – 28 December 2001), was a British Conservative Party politician and businessman.

== Early life ==
A son of Sir Lancelot Royle, a wealthy businessman, he was educated at Harrow and RMA Sandhurst. He joined the Life Guards and subsequently the Special Air Service (SAS). He contracted polio on his way to Korea and was invalided back to the UK, where he spent a year in an iron lung.

After recovering, his father provided funding for him to become a member of Lloyd's of London, building upon his start in 1948 with insurance broker Sedgwick Collins.

== Career ==
In the 1950s, Royle became President of the Western Area Young Conservatives. He unsuccessfully contested St Pancras North in the 1955 general election. As the Conservative candidate in the 1958 Torrington by-election, he failed to hold the usually safe seat.

At the 1959 general election, Royle was finally elected to the House of Commons, as the Member of Parliament (MP) for Richmond, Surrey. He held the seat until he retired at the 1983 general election. Royle was strongly pro-membership of the European Community.

He was a junior minister for Foreign and Commonwealth Affairs from 1970 to 1974. He was appointed a Knight Commander of the Order of St Michael and St George (KCMG) in 1974. He was invited to become Vice Chairman of the Conservative Party by Margaret Thatcher to reform the way the party recruited candidates. He was also responsible for the party's International office.

In 1974 his father passed on his boardroom seats at British Match Corporation, Brooke Bond Liebig and Wilkinson Sword. In 1980, he did not stand for parliament again. He was elevated to the House of Lords in 1983 as Baron Fanshawe of Richmond, of South Cerney in the County of Gloucestershire. He was a director of Westland Helicopters during the 1985 Westland affair, supporting Michael Heseltine's pro-Europe position rather than Margaret Thatcher.

He acted as an informal liaison for the Foreign and Commonwealth Office with Keenie Meenie Services, one of Britain's first private military companies formed by ex-SAS members.

He was Chairman of the Sedgwick Group PLC from 1993 to 1999.

== Personal life ==
He married former Vogue model Shirley Worthington in 1957 and had two daughters, one of whom, Lucinda, is married to a Conservative hereditary peer, Lord de Mauley.

Coat of arms of Anthony Royle, Baron Fanshawe of Richmond

Crest
On a chapeau Sable turned up Erminois a dragon's head erased Or breathing flames of fire Proper.
Escutcheon
Quarterly: 1st & 4th per pale Or and Sable on a chevron per pale Sable and Or between three fleurs-de-lys as many leopards' heads counterchanged (Royle); 2nd Or a chevron between three fleurs-de-lys Sable (Fanshawe); 3rd checky Azure and Argent overall a cross Gules.
Supporters
Two dragons Or winged Sable each breathing flames of fire Proper and gorged with a collar checky Argent and Azure rimmed Gules.
Motto
In Duo Confide Et Persevero

Parliament of the United Kingdom
| Preceded by Sir George Harvie-Watt | Member of Parliament for Richmond; 1959–1983 | Constituency abolished |
