= George Harvie-Watt =

British Member of Parliament (1903–1989)

Sir George Steven Harvie-Watt Bt
- Sir George Steven Harvie-Watt in 1945

Member of Parliament for Keighley
- In office 27 October 1931 – 25 October 1935
- Preceded by: Hastings Lees-Smith
- Succeeded by: Hastings Lees-Smith

Member of Parliament for Richmond (Surrey)
- In office 25 February 1937 – 18 September 1959
- Preceded by: William Ray
- Succeeded by: Anthony Royle
- Majority: 12,837 (45.4%)

Parliamentary Private Secretary to the Prime Minister
- In office 1941–1945
- Prime Minister: Winston Churchill
- Preceded by: Brendan Bracken
- Succeeded by: Geoffrey de freitas

Personal details
- Born: 23 August 1903
- Died: 18 December 1989 (aged 86)
- Party: Conservative
- Spouse: Jane Elizabeth Taylor (m. 4 January 1932)
- Children: 3
- Education: George Watson's College
- Alma mater: University of Glasgow; University of Edinburgh

Military service
- Allegiance: United Kingdom
- Branch/service: British Army
- Rank: Lieutenant-Colonel; Brigadier
- Unit: Territorial Army Royal Engineers
- Awards: Efficiency Decoration (TD)

Sir George Steven Harvie-Watt, 1st Baronet, QC, TD, DL, FRSA (23 August 1903 – 18 December 1989) was a British barrister and Conservative Party politician.

Harvie-Watt studied at George Watson's College in Edinburgh, then at the University of Glasgow and the University of Edinburgh. In 1924, he was commissioned into the Territorial Army Royal Engineers. In 1930, he became a barrister at Inner Temple, while at the 1931 general election, he was elected as member of parliament (MP) for Keighley. He lost his seat in 1935, but re-entered Parliament by winning a by-election for the seat of Richmond (Surrey) in 1937. He immediately became Parliamentary Private Secretary to the Board of Trade, and was also promoted in the Territorial Army: to Lieutenant-Colonel in 1938, and Brigadier in 1941.

From 1941 to 1945, Harvie-Watt served as Parliamentary Private Secretary to Winston Churchill. He was awarded the Efficiency Decoration (TD) in 1942 for 20 years' service in the Territorial Army. At the end of World War II, he became a Queen's Counsel and was created a baronet (see Harvie-Watt baronets). In 1948 he became an aide-de-camp to George VI; on the king's death, he filled the same position for Elizabeth II, also acting as a member of the Queen's Body Guard for Scotland. He left Parliament at the 1959 general election, becoming the chairman of Consolidated Gold Fields. By 1969, he was one of the highest paid people in the United Kingdom.

He was Deputy Lieutenant of Greater London from 1966 to 1989 and was made a Fellow of the Royal Society of Arts in 1973.

Parliament of the United Kingdom
Preceded by Hastings Lees-Smith	Member of Parliament for Keighley; 1931–1935	Succeeded by Hastings Lees-Smith
Preceded by William Ray	Member of Parliament for Richmond (Surrey); 1937–1959	Succeeded by Anthony Royle
Government offices
Preceded by Brendan Bracken	Parliamentary Private Secretary to the Prime Minister; 1941–1945	Succeeded by Geoffrey de freitas
Baronetage of the United Kingdom
New creation	Baronet (of Bathgate); 1945–1989	Succeeded by James Harvie-Watt
