= Lou Sherman =

Sir Louis Sherman (23 May 1914 – 16 November 2001) was a British politician, who achieved greatest prominence as chair of the London Boroughs Association.

Born to a working class Jewish family in Whitechapel, Sherman worked as a tailor's cutter before becoming a taxi driver. He claimed to have qualified by obtaining The Knowledge in a record twelve weeks. In the 1930s, he joined the Young Communist League, inspired by its opposition to fascism, but he left the group at the end of the decade. He joined the National Fire Service during World War II, but suffered serious injuries after falling through the roof while fighting a large fire on Oxford Street, and was invalided out.

Sherman's health slowly improved, and he was able to return to taxi driving. In 1953, he was elected as a Labour Party member of Hackney Metropolitan Borough Council, associated with the left wing of the party. He switched to become an alderman in 1959, was leader of the council from 1957 to 1960, and Mayor of Hackney in 1961/62. At the 1961 London County Council election, he was elected in Hackney Central, serving until the council's abolition, in 1965.

Much of Sherman's time was focused on Hackney, and he championed the development of the Lea Valley Park, which opened in 1966. He supported the Theatre Workshop, persuading boroughs in the area to jointly award it grants when it was in danger of closing. He also represented the borough on the Inner London Education Authority, and became vice chair of the Association of Metropolitan Authorities.

In 1971, Sherman was elected as chair of the London Boroughs Association. He promoted closer co-operation between the London boroughs and the Greater London Council, and led campaigns for increased rate subsidies for London, half price bus fares for pensioners, and more affordable housing. He was knighted in the 1975 New Year Honours, and that year finally stopped driving his taxi. He largely retired in 1978, but served as chair of the Housing Corporation until 1980, and was deputy chair of the Harlow Development Corporation. He was a humanist and patron of Humanists UK until his death.
