= Elliott Dodds =

British journalist, newspaper editor, Liberal politician and thinker

George Elliott Dodds CBE (4 March 1889 – 20 February 1977) was a British journalist, newspaper editor, Liberal politician and thinker.

== Education and career ==
Elliott Dodds was born in Sydenham, in Kent, the son of a tea merchant. He was educated at Mill Hill School and New College, Oxford where he read history. While at Oxford Dodds was editor of The Isis and was narrowly defeated for the presidency of the Union. After graduating he worked briefly for Herbert Samuel as his private secretary and tutor to Samuel's sons. He then went to Jamaica and taught at Calabar High School. He returned to England intending to read for the bar but was drawn instead to journalism, accepting the post of leader writer and literary assistant on the Huddersfield Examiner in 1914. He maintained his connection with the Huddersfield Examiner for sixty years, as editor from 1924 to 1959 and Consulting Editor after that. During the First World War Dodds lived in London editing the War Pictorial, a government publication designed to bolster civilian morale.

== Politics and liberalism ==
In 1920 Dodds wrote his first book, Is Liberalism Dead? As far as Dodds' efforts to enter Parliament were concerned, it seemed it was. He tried without success at York in 1922 and 1923, at Halifax in 1929 and at Rochdale in 1931 and 1935. At Rochdale in 1931, Dodds stood in support of the National Government but because of his views on free trade and opposition to tariffs the Conservatives decided to put up their own National candidate thus splitting the anti-Labour vote. Un-discouraged by his defeats, he continued to play a role in the National League of Young Liberals of which he was president from 1932 to 1937 and to write about Liberalism publishing Liberalism in Action in 1922 and The Social Gospel of Liberalism in 1926.

Dodds' Liberalism was in the classical liberal tradition, unsympathetic to excessive state intervention in the economy and it put him in broad opposition to the social and industrial policies which the party took up in the 1920s and 1930s in response to the depression and mass unemployment. However he was clever and tribal enough to recognise the electoral value of such policies and politically nimble enough to reconcile it with his own position by placing it in the several strands of liberal thought around which the party needed to coalesce. Trevor Wilson claims there was a choice for radicals and traditionalists in the party. They could withdraw from politics, they could defect to other parties or they could "allow distrust of Lloyd George to be outweighed by sympathy for the new thought and daring programme he was offering". In 1938 Dodds chaired the party's Ownership for All Committee. Its resulting report reiterated the traditional Liberal position on the role of property ownership as the "bedrock of liberty". The report called for restoration of free trade, reforms of the rating system, and came out against state intervention in the economy except in the most extreme of circumstances. More positively it also promoted co-ownership in industry – a policy with which Dodds became increasingly associated. The report was endorsed by the 1938 Liberal Assembly but was a cause of tension and dispute between the left and right of the party for years.

However Dodds was not one of those Liberals like Arthur Seldon, Oliver Smedley, Alfred Suenson-Taylor, 1st Baron Grantchester or S. W. Alexander who openly campaigned to build high the edifice of Gladstonian liberalism in the party to ward off the rising floodwater of William Beveridge and John Maynard Keynes and who drifted away from mainstream party thinking to the right, into influential think-tanks like the Institute of Economic Affairs or organisations such as the Society for Individual Freedom between the 1930s and 1960s. Dodds welcomed the Beveridge Report and maintained links with the radical wing of the party. In 1953 he became chairman of the Unservile State Group, which aimed to explore the attitudes and policies of British Liberalism for the first time since the publication of the Liberal Yellow Book in 1928. It did not seek to promote any particular Liberal brand or establish any new path for the Liberalism but disseminate ideas which were distinctly liberal, reflecting the rich variety of the liberal tradition. In 1957 Dodds wrote in the opening chapter of the book The Unservile State: Essays in Liberty and Welfare that he looked forward to the Liberals "re-establish[ing] themselves in their natural position as the acknowledged leaders of the Left...". He understood that political parties could not stand still writing in his 1947 book The Defence of Man that "on the Continent, Liberal thought remained hobbled by the dogmas of laissez-faire, and the Liberal parties failed to go forward".

Dodds was president of the Liberal Party in 1948 and was later elected on a number of occasions as one of the party's vice-presidents along with such figures as William Beveridge, Lady Megan Lloyd George, Dingle Foot and Lady Violet Bonham Carter.

== Family and private life ==
Dodds married Frances Zita MacDonald, the daughter of a Congregationalist minister of religion, in 1918. They had two daughters. His wife died in 1971. Dodds was a committed Christian serving Highfield Congregationalist Church as a deacon throughout his life and he loved to play golf.

== Works by Elliott Dodds ==
- Is Liberalism Dead? – 1920
- Liberalism in Action – 1922
- Ownership for All – 1938
- Let's Try Liberalism – 1944
- The Defence of Man – 1947
- "Liberty and Welfare", in Watson, G., ed., The Unservile State – 1957
- The Logic of Liberty (with E. Reiss) – 1966

Party political offices
Preceded by Isaac Foot	President of the Liberal Party; 1948–1949	Succeeded by Andrew McFadyean
