= John Beeching Frankenburg =

British barrister and Liberal Party politician

John Beeching Frankenburg (19 April 1921 – 11 July 1981) was a British barrister and Liberal Party politician.

== Background ==
Frankenburg was the son of Sidney Frankenburg JP and Charis Frankenburg, MA Oxon, SCM, JP. Sidney Frankenburg had founded the first Jewish branch of the British Legion. Charis Frankenburg was with Mary Stocks the co-founder of the Manchester and Salford Mothers Clinic and was eventually made a ‘Freeman’ of the City of Salford. He was educated at Stowe School in Buckinghamshire and Balliol College, Oxford where he received a Master of Arts (Hons Jurisprudence). In 1952 he married Pamela Holmes. They had two sons.

== Professional career ==
In 1940, while reading law at University, Frankenburg volunteered for the Army, joining the Cheshire Regiment and in 1941 was given his first command serving in Egypt and Palestine. In 1942 while serving in North Africa he was taken prisoner by the Germans. While a prisoner of war in Germany he continued his law studies and passed his first Bar examination. In 1945 he was invalided out of the Army. In 1947 he was Called to the Bar, by the Inner Temple. He practised in London and on the Oxford circuit. In 1955 he had published 'The Young Lawyer' written with J. L. Clay and John Arnold Baker. In 1958 he became Assistant Legal Adviser to the Director of Public Prosecutions. In 1960 he took up an appointment with the British Council. In 1964 he became the British Council's Legal Adviser.

== Political career ==
While at University Frankenburg joined the Liberal Party. In 1947 he was President of Oxford University Liberal Club. He was Chairman of the Union of University Liberal Societies. He became Vice-Chairman of the National League of Young Liberals. In 1947 he was elected to the Liberal Party Council and to the Liberal Party National Executive. In 1949 he was a Liberal candidate, alongside Doreen Gorsky for Earl's Court ward in the Kensington Metropolitan Borough Council elections. He was Treasurer of the World Federation of Liberal and Radical Youth. He served as treasurer of the World Assembly of Youth 1950-1951.

He was Liberal candidate for the Kensington South division of London at the 1950 General Election, finishing third;

General Election 23 February 1950: Kensington South
Party	Candidate	Votes	%	±%
Conservative	Patrick Spens	32,870	73.1	
Labour	Marcel Philip Picard	8,002	17.8	
Liberal	John Beeching Frankenburg	4,079	9.1	
Majority		24,868	55.3	
Turnout		63,319	71.0	
Conservative hold		Swing		

He became Chairman of the National League of Young Liberals. He was Liberal candidate for the Berwick-upon-Tweed division of Northumberland at the 1951 General Election and finished third;

General Election 1951: Berwick-upon-Tweed Electorate : 42,438
Party	Candidate	Votes	%	±%
Conservative	Antony Lambton	17,632	52.70	
Labour	Thomas H. Jones	11,069	33.08	
Liberal	John Beeching Frankenburg	4,759	14.22	
Majority		6,563	19.61	
Turnout			78.84	
Conservative hold		Swing		

He was Liberal candidate for the Nuneaton division of Warwickshire at the 1955 General Election and finished third;

1955 United Kingdom general election: Nuneaton
Party	Candidate	Votes	%	±%
Labour	Frank Bowles	25,112	55.8	
Conservative	R Dermott D Griffith	14,828	33.0	
Liberal	John Beeching Frankenburg	5,048	11.2	
Majority		10,284	22.9	
Turnout			79.7	
Labour hold		Swing		

He did not stand for parliament again. By 1956 he had ceased active involvement with the Liberal Party at a national level. In 1971 he became a School Governor of St Andrew's School, Pangbourne, in Berkshire.
