= Harry Becker (politician) =

British politician (1892–1980)

- Becker in 1923

Member of Parliament for Richmond (Surrey)
- In office 15 November 1922 – 9 October 1924
- Preceded by: Clifford Blackburn Edgar
- Succeeded by: Newton Moore

Personal details
- Born: Harry Thomas Alfred Becker; 16 June 1892 Wandsworth, County of London, England
- Died: 6 March 1980 (aged 87)
- Party: Independent Conservative (1922-1923); Conservative (1923-1924)

Harry Thomas Alfred Becker (16 June 1892 – 6 March 1980) was a British politician.

Born in Wandsworth, Becker was the son of Sir Frederick Becker. He was educated at Colet Court and then Uppingham School. He served in the Suffolk Regiment of the British Army during World War I, temporarily reaching the rank of second lieutenant before being discharged due to poor health.

At the 1918 general election, Becker stood in Bermondsey West for the National Federation of Discharged and Demobilized Sailors and Soldiers. He did not win the seat, but was successful at Richmond (Surrey) in 1922 general election as an independent Conservative, with the backing of the Anti-Waste League. He was adopted as an official Conservative Party candidate at the 1923 general election and held his seat, but stood down at the following year's election.

Becker married four times, firstly to Anne Lipton in 1912, then to Mabel Parnham in 1926, Dorothy Newman in 1952, and then finally to Mary Beth Browder in 1952. Browder was from Tennessee, and Becker became an American citizen in 1955.

Parliament of the United Kingdom
| Preceded by Clifford Blackburn Edgar | Member of Parliament for Richmond (Surrey); 1922–1924 | Succeeded by Newton Moore |
