= 1937 Richmond (Surrey) by-election =

UK Parliamentary by-election

The 1937 Richmond (Surrey) by-election was held on 25 February 1937. The by-election was held due to the resignation of the incumbent Conservative MP, William Ray. It was won by the Conservative candidate George Harvie-Watt.

Richmond (Surrey) by-election, 1937
Party	Candidate	Votes	%	±%
Conservative	George Harvie-Watt	20,546	72.7	−0.8
Labour	George Rogers	7,709	27.3	+0.8
Majority		12,837	45.4	−1.6
Turnout		28,255	47.3	−22.5
Conservative hold		Swing	-0.8	
