= Harvie-Watt baronets =

Baronetcy in the Baronetage of the United Kingdom

The Harvie-Watt Baronetcy, of Bathgate in the County of Linlithgow, is a title in the Baronetage of the United Kingdom. It was created on 5 September 1945 for the Unionist politician George Harvie-Watt. He represented Keighley and Richmond in the House of Commons and was Winston Churchill's Parliamentary Private Secretary from 1941 to 1945. The title is presently held by his son, the second Baronet, who succeeded in 1989.

== Harvie-Watt baronets, of Bathgate (1945) ==
- Sir George Harvie-Watt, 1st Baronet (1903–1989)
- Sir James Harvie-Watt, 2nd Baronet (born 1940)

The heir apparent is the present holder's son Mark Harvie-Watt (born 1969). His heir-in-line is his eldest son James Alexander Harvie-Watt (born 2002).
