= Newton Moore =

Australian army officer and politician (1870–1936)

Major General Sir Newton Moore KCMG, VD
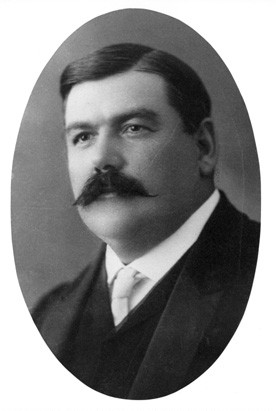

8th Premier of Western Australia
- In office 7 May 1906 – 16 September 1910
- Monarchs: Edward VII; George V
- Governor: Sir Frederick Bedford; Sir Gerald Strickland
- Preceded by: Sir Cornthwaite Rason
- Succeeded by: Frank Wilson
- Constituency: Bunbury

Member of Parliament for St George's, Hanover Square
- In office 4 October 1918 – 25 November 1918
- Preceded by: Sir George Reid
- Succeeded by: Walter Hume Long

Member of Parliament for Islington North
- In office 14 December 1918 – 16 November 1923
- Preceded by: Sir George Touche
- Succeeded by: William Henry Cowan

Member of Parliament for Richmond (Surrey)
- In office 29 October 1924 – 13 April 1932
- Preceded by: Harry Thomas Alfred Becker
- Succeeded by: Sir William Ray

Personal details
- Born: 17 May 1870 Fremantle, Western Australia
- Died: 28 October 1936 (aged 66) London, England
- Party: Unaligned (Western Australia); Conservative (United Kingdom)
- Spouse: Isabella Lowrie
- Relations: Sir Rodney Moore (son)
- Profession: Surveyor
- Civilian awards: Knight Commander of the Order of St Michael and St George

Military service
- Allegiance: Colony of Western Australia; Australia
- Branch/service: Western Australian Volunteers; Citizens Military Force
- Years of service: 1893–1918
- Rank: Major General
- Commands: AIF Depots in the United Kingdom (1915–17); Intelligence Corps, 5th Military District (1908–14); 18th Australian Light Horse (1901–08); Mounted Half Company, Bunbury Rifle Volunteers (1900–01)
- Battles/wars: First World War
- Military awards: Colonial Auxiliary Forces Officers' Decoration

Major General Sir Newton James Moore, KCMG, VD (17 May 1870 – 28 October 1936) was an Australian politician, businessman and army officer. He served as the eighth Premier of Western Australia from 1906 to 1910 and, following service in the First World War, was a member of the House of Commons of the United Kingdom from 1918 to 1932. He was the father of Sir Rodney Moore.

== Early life and career ==
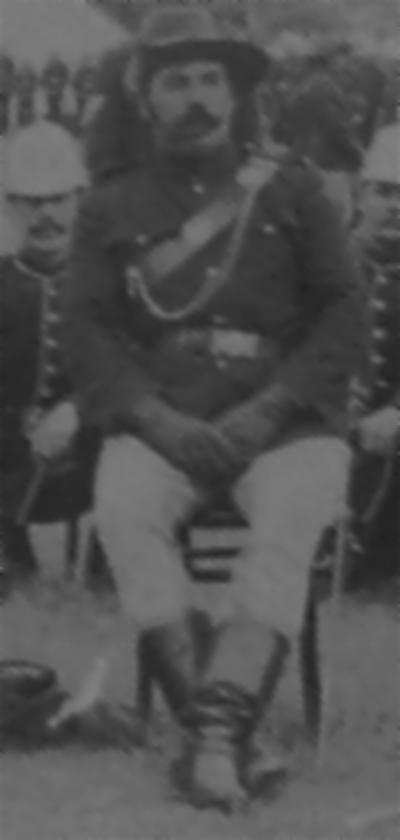
Captain Newton Moore, Bunbury Rifle Volunteers, 1900

Newton Moore was born in Fremantle, Western Australia, son of James Moore, auctioneer and later mayor of Bunbury, and Elizabeth Dawson, schoolteacher. He was educated at Arthur Street Primary School in Bunbury before attending Prince Alfred College in Adelaide, South Australia. In 1886, he was apprenticed as a surveyor to Alexander Forrest. After qualifying in 1894, he worked as a contract surveyor in and around the Bunbury area. In April 1898 he married Isabella Lowrie, sister of William Lowrie.

In 1899 Moore was elected to the Bunbury Municipal Council, and was Mayor of Bunbury from 1900 to 1904. In 1903 he was also a member of the Royal Commission on Forestry, and during 1904 and 1905 he was President of the Municipal Association of Western Australia.

Moore was also involved in the Western Australian militia, commencing a long career as a private with the BRV (Bunbury Rifle Volunteers) in 1894. By 1900 he had risen to captain and was instrumental in assisting in the formation of the BRV Mounted Infantry Section, which was later incorporated into the WAMI (Western Australian Mounted Infantry). After the Commonwealth reorganisation of 1903, the unit was renamed the 18th (WAMI) Australian Light Horse. Moore served as acting commander until 1908, when he was promoted to lieutenant colonel and officially appointed the commanding officer. In August 1908, Moore was appointed commanding officer of the 5th Military District Intelligence Section, where he remained until March 1914.

== State politics and premier ==
In 1901, Moore contested the Western Australian Legislative Assembly seat of Bunbury, but was unsuccessful. In 1904 he contested the seat again and won. In August 1905, he was appointed Minister for Lands and Agriculture in Cornthwaite Rason's government. On Rason's resignation on 7 May 1906, he became Premier of Western Australia. At 36 years old, he was at the time the youngest ever premier. He remains the most inexperienced politician ever to hold the office, having served in parliament for less than two years at the time of his appointment.

Moore's emphasis as Premier was on agricultural development. He personally retained the Lands and Agriculture portfolio, and pursued a policy of cheap land for settlers. His government laid the foundations of the Wheatbelt, and brought the state into line with the rest of Australia through an Income and Land tax, despite opposition from the conservative Legislative Council.

In September 1907, after a dispute with the Legislative Council, Moore resigned as premier. However, Governor Bedford would not accept his resignation, nor would he consent to an early dissolution, so Moore resumed office. In 1908, Moore led the Liberal Party to another election victory. As the state had previously seen nine Premiers in a little over five years, this was a welcome respite from a period of great instability. Moore was Minister for Justice from 14 May 1909 until 30 June 1909, when he relinquished both the Agriculture and Lands portfolio and the Justice portfolio, and took up the office of Colonial Treasurer. On 16 September 1910, Moore resigned as Premier and Colonial Treasurer on the grounds of ill health.

== Agent-General and First World War ==
Moore was made a Companion of the Order of St Michael and St George in June 1908, and knighted as a Knight Commander of the Order of St Michael and St George in June 1910. In February 1911, he resigned his Bunbury seat to take up the office of Agent-General for Western Australia in London, a position he held until 1914. In this capacity Moore approved the first boys to migrate to and reside at the Fairbridge Farm School in Pinjarra.

In 1915, during World War I, while still Agent-General, the Australian government appointed him General Officer Commanding Australian Imperial Forces in the United Kingdom. He held that position until 1917, during which time he was promoted to the rank of major general. In November 1915 he was promoted to temporary colonel.

== British politics ==
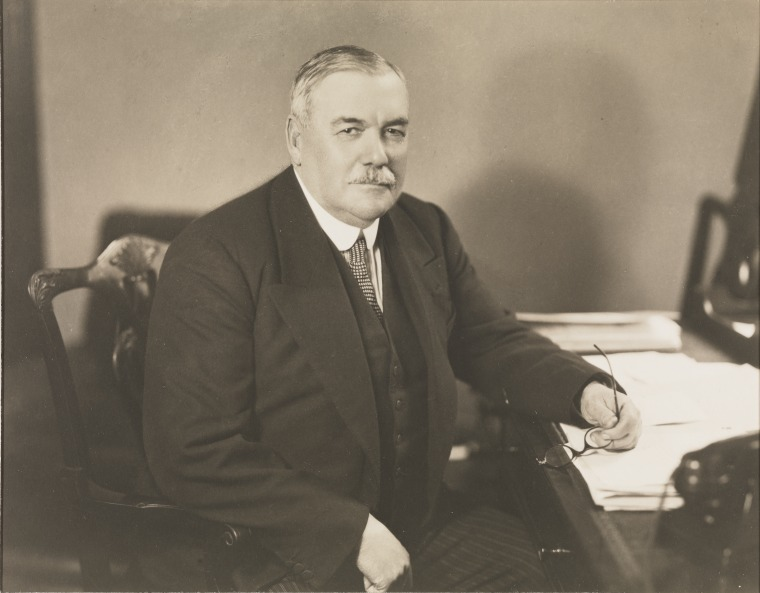
Moore in 1932

In 1918, Moore resigned as Agent-General after being invited by the Conservative Party to stand for the British House of Commons seat of St George's, Hanover Square, which had been made vacant by the death of former Prime Minister of Australia Sir George Reid. He was elected to the seat on 4 October 1918. In the 1918 general election on 14 December he instead stood for and won the seat of Islington North. After a break from politics in 1923 and 1924, he won the seat of Richmond (Surrey) in the general election of 29 October 1924, and held it until his resignation on 13 April 1932. For ten years, he was Chairman of the Standing Orders Committee of the House of Commons. He established himself as an excellent representative of Australia, and his opinion on Empire matters was highly valued by British ministers.

After retiring from politics, Moore became President of the British Empire Steel Corporation, a company with interests in Western Australia and Canada. He was also a director of several important companies. He died on 28 October 1936 at a nursing home in London, following surgery.

Newton Moore Senior High School in Bunbury is named after him.

== See also ==
- 1916 Pioneer Exhibition Game

== Notes ==
Political offices
Preceded by Cornthwaite Rason	Premier of Western Australia; 1906–1910	Succeeded by Frank Wilson
Parliament of the United Kingdom
Preceded by Sir George Reid	Member of Parliament for St George's, Hanover Square; October 1918–December 1918	Succeeded by Walter Long
Preceded by Sir George Touche	Member of Parliament for Islington North; 1918–1923	Succeeded by Henry Cowan
Preceded by Harry Becker	Member of Parliament for Richmond (Surrey); 1924–1932	Succeeded by Sir William Ray
