= Mary O'Brien Harris =

British politician (1865–1938)

Mary O'Brien Harris (1865 – 19 April 1938) was a British politician.

Born Mary O'Brien, she was educated at Somerville College, Oxford. She joined the Fabian Society in 1894, and served on its executive committee from 1898 until 1901. She remained involved with the organisation, and was a prominent figure in the Fabian Women's Group for many years. She was also a founder member of the Socialist Quaker Society.

O'Brien married J. Theodore Harris, and added his surname to her name. She served as headteacher of Clapton Girls' Academy for many years.

In 1934, O'Brien Harris was elected to the London County Council as a Labour Party member, representing Hackney Central, and she held the seat until her death, in 1938.
