= Seymour Lodge =

- Location in Dundee
- 56.4569°N 2.9997°W

History
- Built: 1880

Site notes
- Architect(s): Charles and Leslie Ower

Listed Building – Category A
- Designated: 4 February 1965
- Reference no.: LB25542

Seymour Lodge is a Victorian Gothic mansion located in Perth Road, Dundee, Scotland. It is a category A listed building.

== History ==
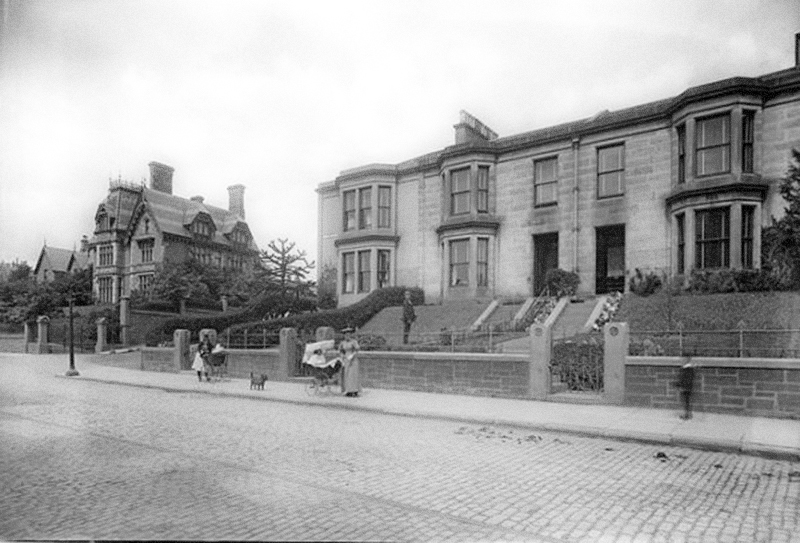
Seymour Lodge (left), view along Perth Road, circa 1880

It was built as a private villa in 1880 by architects Charles and Leslie Ower, for Henry McGrady. The building was later utilised as Seymour Lodge School which was a private all-girls establishment. In 1939, when Britain declared war on Germany, the school relocated to Ochtertyre House, Crieff, and closed in 1966. The house was afterwards used as a child protection unit, which was replaced by new accommodation at King's Cross Hospital. Seymour Lodge was offered for sale in November 2012.
