= Bernard Homa =

Bernard Homa (1900 – September 1991) was a British medical doctor and politician, who served on London County Council.

Born in Whitechapel as Bernard Deichowsky, he was educated at the Yeshivah Etz Chaim in Aldgate, then studied medicine. During this period, he became the chair of the London Mizrachi Students' Society, and he later chaired the Mizrachi Organisation of Great Britain. For 37 years, he served as president of the Machzikei Hadath Synagogue.

Homa joined the Labour Party, and at the 1934 London County Council election, he was elected in Hackney Central. During World War II, Homa served as a major in the Royal Army Medical Corps.

After World War II, Homa became a leading figure in British Judaism. In 1946 he resigned from the Anglo-Jewish Association in protest at its opposition to Zionism. He became chair of the Central Council for Jewish Religious Education, president of the Union of Orthodox Hebrew Congregations, chair of the Federation of Synagogues, vice president of the London Board of Shechitah, and president of the Initiation Society. He also served on the Board of Deputies.

Homa remained politically active, switching to represent Hackney South from the 1949 London County Council election. At the 1951 and 1955 general elections, he stood unsuccessfully in Hendon South. During this period, he continued to work in general practice, and also served on the board of governors of Charing Cross Hospital.

Homa stood down from the county council in 1955, and thereafter spent more time writing. His works included A Fortress in Anglo-Jewry, Orthodoxy in Anglo-Jewry, and his autobiography, published in 1990, Footsteps on the Sands of Time.
