= Sedgwick Group =

British insurance broker

- Type: Public
- Industry: Insurance
- Founded: 19th century
- Defunct: 1998
- Fate: Acquired
- Successor: Marsh & McLennan
- Headquarters: London, United Kingdom
- Key people: Sax Riley, (Chairman); Rob White-Cooper (CEO)

Sedgwick Group plc was a very large British insurance broker. It was listed on the London Stock Exchange and was a constituent of the FTSE 100 Index. It was acquired by Marsh & McLennan in 1998.

== History ==
The Company was founded by Harry Thomas (later Harry Beaufoy) Leonard Sedgwick (1855–1931) late in the 19th century as an insurance broker under the name Sedgwick, Collins & Co. In 1972 it merged with Price Forbes to form Sedgwick Forbes.

The Company was acquired by Marsh & McLennan in December 1998.
