= William Ray (British politician) =

British politician (1876–1937)

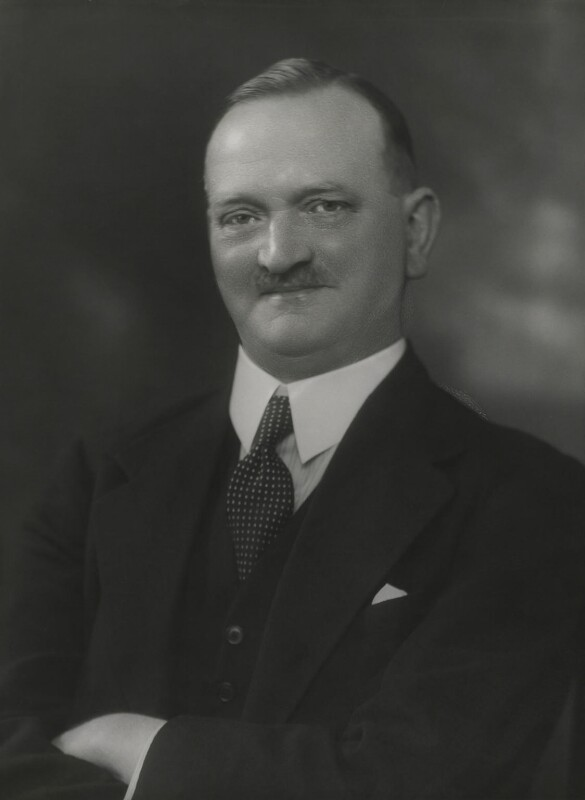
Ray in 1932

Sir William Ray JP (7 February 1876 – 30 September 1937) was a Conservative politician in the United Kingdom. He was knighted in 1929. Ray was elected member of parliament (MP) for Richmond in 1932, resigning in 1937.

Political offices
Preceded by George Hume	Leader of London County Council; 1925–1934	Succeeded by Herbert Morrison
Parliament of the United Kingdom
Preceded by Sir Newton Moore	Member of Parliament for Richmond; 1932–1937	Succeeded by George Harvie-Watt
Party political offices
Preceded by George Hume	Leader of the Municipal Reform Party on London County Council; 1925–1934	Succeeded by Harold Webbe
