= Mud, Sweat, and Tears =

2011 autobiography of Bear Grylls

Mud, Sweat, and Tears: The Autobiography
- First edition
- Author: Bear Grylls
- Language: English
- Subject: Autobiography
- Publisher: Transworld Publishers
- Publication date: 26 May 2011
- Publication place: United Kingdom
- Media type: Print (hardcover), audiobook, e-book
- Pages: 416
- ISBN: 978-0062124197
- Followed by: A Survival Guide for Life: How to Achieve Your Goals, Thrive in Adversity, and Grow in Character

Mud, Sweat, and Tears: The Autobiography is a 2011 autobiography written by Northern Irish adventurer, writer and television presenter Bear Grylls. It is the eleventh book published by Grylls.

== Overview ==
Grylls' autobiography details his life before his career as the host of Man vs. Wild, focusing on his childhood, growing up on the Isle of Wight, and other times in Grylls' early life.

Mud, Sweat, and Tears was named one of the best autobiographies for children and teenagers to read by The Guardian. In 2012, the book was voted "the most influential book in China".
