= Running Wild with Bear Grylls =

American reality television series

- Also known as: Running Wild with Bear Grylls: The Challenge; Bear Grylls Is Running Wild
- Created by: Delbert Shoopman
- Starring: Bear Grylls
- Country of origin: United States
- Original language: English
- No. of seasons: 9
- No. of episodes: 72 (list of episodes)

Production
- Executive producers: Bear Grylls; Ben Silverman; Chris Grant; Corie Henson; Doug McCallie; Laura Caraccioli; Viki Cacciatore; Rob Buchta
- Producers: Elizabeth Schulze; Vanessa Ranko; Blake Smith; Tony Patterson
- Editors: Marc Elmer; Sean Hubbert; Karl Kimbrough; Page Marsella; James Horak
- Running time: 45 minutes
- Production companies: Bear Grylls Ventures (seasons 1–8); Electus (seasons 1–8); Everest Brand Group (season 9); The Natural Studios (season 9); Propagate Content (season 9)

Original release
- Network: NBC
- Release: July 28, 2014 – July 15, 2018
- Network: Nat Geo
- Release: November 5, 2019 – August 27, 2023
- Network: Fox
- Release: April 21, 2026 – present

Running Wild with Bear Grylls is an American survival skills reality television series starring Bear Grylls. In each episode, Grylls brings a different celebrity on a wilderness trip that is pre-arranged and supervised, but is presented as raw and unplanned. The crew includes host Grylls, a story producer, two camera cinematographers, two field recordists, and a mountain guide, who are present throughout filming.

Celebrities such as Zac Efron, Channing Tatum, and Ben Stiller made appearances on the first season of the show. In season 2, Kate Winslet, Michael B. Jordan, Kate Hudson, Michelle Rodriguez, James Marsden, and Barack Obama appeared. The series' fourth season premiered on May 7, 2018.

Grylls announced the show's fifth season on October 27, 2018, which began filming around the same time. In February 2019, it was announced that the show would be moving to National Geographic for its fifth season, which premiered on November 5, 2019. The show was rebranded as Running Wild with Bear Grylls: The Challenge starting with season 7. On February 9, 2026, the series was renewed for a ninth season with the show moving to Fox and rebranded as Bear Grylls Is Running Wild, which premiered on April 21, 2026.

== Description ==
The show is based on the same survivalist concept as Grylls' other shows, such as Man vs. Wild, but with a celebrity joining him for the journey. The journeys include skydiving into the Catskill Mountains and climbing the cliffs in Utah.

The first season began on July 28, 2014, and ended on September 8, 2014, receiving generally positive reviews that improved week by week. For three weeks it was the highest rated unscripted new show of the summer. A second season was announced on March 26, 2015, and began airing in July 2015.

On August 31, 2015, NBC and the White House announced that President Barack Obama would appear as a guest, hike through Exit Glacier and discuss conservation as well as the impact of climate change on the Alaska wilderness.

== Episodes ==
=== Series overview ===
Season	Title	Episodes	Originally released		
Season	Title	Episodes	First released	Last released	Network
1	—N/a	6	July 28, 2014	September 8, 2014	NBC
2	—N/a	9	July 13, 2015	December 17, 2015	NBC
3	—N/a	10	August 1, 2016	September 16, 2017	NBC
4	—N/a	8	May 7, 2018	July 15, 2018	NBC
5	—N/a	10	November 5, 2019	January 21, 2020	Nat Geo
6	—N/a	8	March 29, 2021	May 17, 2021	Nat Geo
7	The Challenge	6	July 25, 2022	August 22, 2022	Nat Geo
8	The Challenge	8	July 9, 2023	August 27, 2023	Nat Geo
9	Bear Grylls Is Running Wild	8	April 21, 2026	June 9, 2026	Fox

=== Season 1 (2014) ===
No. overall	No. in season	Title	Location	Original release date	U.S. viewers (millions)
1	1	"Zac Efron"	Catskill Mountains	July 28, 2014	4.43
Zac Efron joined Bear Grylls on a journey into the Northeast Appalachian wilderness. This journey began as the two of them parachute into the woods, with Grylls executing a front flip. Grylls and Efron proceeded by climbing down a slippery hill with a rope, with Grylls assisting Efron throughout. Efron also discovered a rabbit carcass, which he and Grylls cut open to smell. The two of them collected worms before heading to a cave as their shelter for the night. They then cooked a meal for themselves, which were worms and eggs, while holding a conversation about their backgrounds and the trip. On the next day, Efron and Grylls ventured out into a canyon, again with the help of a rope, and rappelled down a steep cliff. The two dove into a body of water and swam to the shore, ending the episode.
2	2	"Ben Stiller"	Isle of Skye	August 4, 2014	3.97
Ben Stiller joined Bear Grylls on his journey into the Isle of Skye of Northern Scotland. The two of them began by climbing down a slippery terrain, using ropes and surrounding rocks. Grylls made sure to move at Stiller's pace, while asking questions about Stiller's background and career. They then gathered food at a seashore and sheltered themselves inside a cave, where they found clean water to drink. The next day, Stiller struggled to wake up energized, but he still managed to follow Grylls to the edge of a cliff. Similarly to Efron's trip, the two of them dove into the water and swam to the plane. In the UK, this episode was aired as a special in 2014, under the Bear's Wild Weekend banner.
3	3	"Channing Tatum"	Yosemite National Park	August 11, 2014	4.54
Channing Tatum accompanied Bear Grylls on a 48-hour expedition in Yosemite National Park, where they hiked, explored, climbed, and rappelled off cliffs. Tatum and Grylls began their journey in a helicopter ride, later jumping out and doing backflips into the water. After reaching land, they traveled 40 miles through a dense forest to reach their destination. While in the forest, Tatum and Grylls encountered both a scorpion and a rattlesnake, both of which they killed and ate. After finally reaching their destination point, they slept on top of a cliff. The episode concludes as the two rappel down the cliff.
4	4	"Tom Arnold"	Oregon Coast Range	August 18, 2014	3.80
In the fourth episode, Bear Grylls is joined by Tom Arnold on an adventure through the mountains of Oregon. This adventure began with a helicopter ride to an isolated forest, followed by a long hike throughout the woodland. The two reached their first cliff and rappelled down it, and they proceeded to slide down a hill of mud. Now near a river, Grylls and Arnold caught and killed a trout, and then crossed the river with the aid of a log. At the end of the first day, they constructed their own shelter, built a campfire, and cooked the caught trout. The next day, they crossed another river, and the episode was concluded by rappelling down a steep cliff into the water.
5	5	"Tamron Hall"	Pink Cliffs	September 1, 2014	3.84
Tamron Hall, an anchor on The Today Show, explored the wild Utah desert with Bear. Their adventure began by rappelling from a helicopter, followed by rappelling down a cliff. While walking in the desert, Bear found a dead squirrel, proceeded to gut it, and placed it in Tamron's backpack. Later, the two set up camp, cooked the squirrel, and settled for the night. On the second day of their journey, they rappelled down a second, much larger canyon and rode off scene in a motorcycle.
6	6	"Deion Sanders"	Utah desert	September 8, 2014	3.71
Deion Sanders, a retired NFL player, joined Bear in the southern Utah desert in the season finale. Deion's children prompted him to participate in the episode because they said he was becoming "soft." Their journey mainly consisted of hiking through the Utah desert, later rappelling from a tree. Sanders' fear of snakes was an obstacle through the journey, especially with an encounter with a wild snake, which Bear later cooked for their meal. After rappelling down a cliff with remarkable ease, Deion and Bear concluded the episode by climbing up a mesa.

=== Season 2 (2015) ===
No. overall	No. in season	Title	Location	Original release date	U.S. viewers (millions)
7	1	"Kate Hudson"	Dolomites	July 13, 2015	3.74
Actress Kate Hudson goes on a journey with Bear Grylls that involves a treacherous mountain range in Italy; Hudson shares details of her unique upbringing.
8	2	"Jesse Tyler Ferguson"	Italian Alps	July 20, 2015	3.34
9	3	"Kate Winslet"	Snowdonia	July 27, 2015	3.63
10	4	"Ed Helms"	Colorado Mountains	August 3, 2015	3.78
11	5	"Michelle Rodriguez"	Nevada Desert	August 10, 2015	3.84
12	6	"James Marsden"	Utah Canyon	August 24, 2015	2.91
13	7	"Michael B. Jordan"	Welsh Highlands	August 31, 2015	3.35
14	8	"Drew Brees"	Panama Jungle	September 7, 2015	2.83
15	Special–Episode	"President Barack Obama"	Exit Glacier	December 17, 2015	3.55

=== Season 3 (2016–2017) ===
No. overall	No. in season	Title	Location	Original release date	U.S. viewers (millions)
16	1	"Nick Jonas"	Sierra Nevada mountains	August 1, 2016	3.17
17	2	"Julianne Hough"	South African Savanna	August 2, 2016	5.15
18	3	"Courteney Cox"	Irish Highlands	August 22, 2016	4.07
19	4	"Shaquille O'Neal"	Adirondack Mountains	August 29, 2016	4.29
20	5	"Lindsey Vonn"	Corsica	September 5, 2016	3.25
21	6	"Mel B"	Wales	September 7, 2016	5.22
22	7	"Marshawn Lynch"	Corsican Mountains	September 12, 2016	3.64
23	8	"Sterling K. Brown"	Colorado Mountains	May 22, 2017	3.63
24	9	"Julia Roberts"	Kenya	May 25, 2017	4.06
25	10	"Vanessa Hudgens"	Sierra Nevada desert	September 16, 2017	2.11

=== Season 4 (2018) ===
No. overall	No. in season	Title	Location	Original release date	U.S. viewers (millions)
26	1	"Joseph Gordon-Levitt"	Kenya	May 7, 2018	3.53
27	2	"Keri Russell"	Canary Islands	May 14, 2018	3.01
28	3	"Lena Headey"	Iberian Peninsula	May 21, 2018	2.92
29	4	"Don Cheadle"	White Mountains	June 18, 2018	3.15
30	5	"Derek Hough"	Rila	June 25, 2018	3.16
31	6	"Scott Eastwood"	Balkan Peninsula	July 2, 2018	3.13
32	7	"Roger Federer"	Swiss Alps	July 8, 2018	1.88
33	8	"Uzo Aduba"	Pyrenees	July 15, 2018	2.01

=== Season 5 (2019) ===
The series premiered its fifth season on National Geographic on November 5, 2019. Guest celebrities featured include Alex Honnold, Armie Hammer, Brie Larson, Cara Delevingne, Dave Bautista, Zachary Quinto and returning season 1 guest Channing Tatum, among others, with locations including Iceland, Sardinia, Panama, Arizona and Utah.

No. overall	No. in season	Title	Location	Original release date	U.S. viewers (millions)
34	1	"Brie Larson"	Pearl Islands	November 5, 2019	0.399
35	2	"Joel McHale"	Arizona Slot Canyons	November 12, 2019	0.360
36	3	"Cara Delevingne"	Sardinia	November 19, 2019	0.351
37	4	"Rob Riggle"	Iceland	November 26, 2019	0.517
38	5	"Armie Hammer"	Sardinia	December 3, 2019	0.384
39	6	"Dave Bautista"	Glen Canyon	December 10, 2019	0.493
40	7	"Channing Tatum"	Norway	December 15, 2019 (AUS); December 17, 2019 (US)	0.546
41	8	"Alex Honnold"	Swiss Alps	January 7, 2020	0.314
42	9	"Bobby Bones"	Norway	January 14, 2020	0.501
43	10	"Zachary Quinto"	Panama	January 21, 2020	0.378

=== Season 6 (2021) ===
No. overall	No. in season	Title	Location	Original release date	U.S. viewers (millions)
44	1	"Anthony Mackie"	Dolomites	March 29, 2021	0.437
Anthony Mackie joins Bear Grylls for an exhilarating journey in the Italian Dolomites mountain.
45	2	"Terry Crews"	Iceland	April 5, 2021	0.400
Terry Crews joins Bear Grylls for a journey in the Icelandic highlands, where survival is the name of the game, from jagged scree mountains to freezing floodwaters.
46	3	"Danica Patrick"	Moab, Utah	April 12, 2021	0.459
Bear Grylls takes champion auto racer Danica Patrick into the Moab Desert for some high-octane, pulse-pounding action in the wild.
47	4	"Rainn Wilson"	La Sal Mountains	April 19, 2021	0.560
Bear Grylls inspires Rainn Wilson with mountaineering training in the La Sal mountains.
48	5	"Keegan-Michael Key"	Iceland	April 26, 2021	0.391
Bear embarks on an adventure with Keegan-Michael Key in the lava fields of Iceland.
49	6	"Danny Trejo"	Arches National Park	May 3, 2021	0.487
Bear takes Danny Trejo to the canyons of Arches National Park in Utah
50	7	"Gina Carano"	Dolomites	May 10, 2021	0.535
Bear takes Gina Carano out into the rugged wilderness of Italy's Dolomites mountain range.
51	8	"Bobby Bones & fiancée Caitlin Parker"	Sierra Nevada	May 17, 2021	0.470
Bear takes Bobby Bones out into the rugged wilderness of the eastern Sierra Nevada with his new fiancée, Caitlin Parker.

=== Season 7: The Challenge (2022) ===
No. overall	No. in season	Title	Location	Original release date	U.S. viewers (millions)
52	1	"Natalie Portman"	Escalante Desert	July 25, 2022	0.266
Bear sets challenges for Natalie Portman in the slot canyons of the Escalante Desert.
53	2	"Simu Liu"	Canadian Rockies	August 1, 2022	0.274
Bear Grylls teaches Simu Liu essential survival skills in the sub-zero weather of the Canadian Rockies.
54	3	"Ashton Kutcher"	Costa Rica	August 8, 2022	0.310
Bear Grylls tests Ashton Kutcher's ability to survive in the wilds of the Costa Rican jungle.
55	4	"Florence Pugh"	Costa Rica	August 15, 2022	0.333
Bear Grylls takes Florence Pugh on a challenging adventure in the volcanic rainforests of Costa Rica.
56	5	"Anthony Anderson"	Sierra Nevada	August 22, 2022	0.381
Bear Grylls takes Anthony Anderson into the Sierra Nevada Mountains to teach him mountaineering skills.
57	6	"Rob Riggle"	Great Basin Desert	August 22, 2022	0.301
To prepare for an upcoming movie role, actor Rob Riggle travels to the Great Basin Desert to learn mountain man survival skills from Bear Grylls.

=== Season 8: The Challenge (2023) ===
No. overall	No. in season	Title	Location	Original release date	U.S. viewers (millions)
58	1	"Bradley Cooper"	Wyoming Basin	July 9, 2023	N/A
59	2	"Benedict Cumberbatch"	Isle of Skye	July 16, 2023	N/A
60	3	"Cynthia Erivo"	Brecon Beacons	July 23, 2023	N/A
61	4	"Troy Kotsur"	Scottish Highlands	July 30, 2023	N/A
61	5	"Russell Brand"	Hebrides	August 6, 2023	N/A
62	6	"Rita Ora"	Valley of Fire	August 13, 2023	N/A
63	7	"Daveed Diggs"	Great Basin Desert	August 20, 2023	N/A
64	8	"Tatiana Maslany"	Laramie Mountains	August 27, 2023	N/A

=== Season 9: Bear Grylls Is Running Wild ===
No. overall	No. in season	Title	Location	Original release date	U.S. viewers (millions)
65	1	"Bear with Matthew McConaughey"	Norway	April 21, 2026	N/A
66	2	"Bear with Tiffany Haddish"	Colorado River	April 28, 2026	N/A
67	3	"Bear with MGK"	Norwegian Arctic Rainforest	May 5, 2026	N/A
68	4	"Bear with Uma Thurman"	Eryri Mountains	May 12, 2026	N/A
69	5	"Bear with Michelle Monaghan"	Great Basin Desert	May 19, 2026	N/A
70	6	"Bear with Elizabeth Banks"	Folgefonna	May 26, 2026	N/A
71	7	"Bear with Rhys Darby"	Canyonlands National Park	June 2, 2026	N/A
72	8	"Bear with Colman Domingo"	Irish Sea	June 9, 2026	N/A

== French version ==
A French version of Running Wild with Bear Grylls titled À l'état sauvage airs in the French on M6. It is hosted by Mike Horn and premiered on the network on June 28, 2016.

=== À L'État Sauvage ===
Six episodes aired between 2016 and 2018. In each episode, Horn brings a different celebrity along on his adventures. The following six French celebrities made their embarked on an adventure with Horn: Michaël Youn, Matt Pokora, Laure Manaudou, Christophe Dechavanne, Shy'm and Adriana Karembeu. Each episode is set in different countries around the world: Namibia, Sri Lanka, Botswana, Venezuela and Nepal.

=== Cap Horn ===
After the six episodes of À L'État Sauvage, Horn started his own format of the show: Cap Horn. Two episodes aired, featuring celebrities Arnaud Ducret and Bernard de La Villardière, whom he embarked on adventures with in the Philippines.
