= List of Man vs. Wild episodes =

Man vs. Wild is a television series on Discovery Channel in the United States, Australia, New Zealand, Canada, Brazil, India and Europe. The show is called Born Survivor in parts of Europe, including the UK, where it was originally broadcast by Channel 4, but latterly moved to Discovery Channel UK. In Africa, Asia and eastern parts of Europe, it is titled Ultimate Survival and also broadcast by Discovery Channel.

== Series overview ==
Season	Episodes	Originally released	
Season	Episodes	First released	Last released
1	15	March 10, 2006	July 20, 2007
2	13	November 9, 2007	June 6, 2008
3	12	August 6, 2008	February 23, 2009
4	14	August 12, 2009	February 17, 2010
5	7	August 11, 2010	September 22, 2010
6	6	February 17, 2011	March 24, 2011
7	6	July 11, 2011	November 29, 2011

== Episodes ==
=== Season 1 (2006–2007) ===
No. overall	No. in season	Title	Directed by	Survival expert(s)	Original release date
1	1	"The Rockies" "Pilot"	Mike Warner	Ron Hood & Mike Johnston	March 10, 2006
Bear Grylls gets dropped in the middle of the Canadian Rocky Mountains in British Columbia and must find his way back to civilization. On his way out, he must avoid the danger of grizzly bears, jump 70 feet into a river, and abseil down a cliff.
2	2	"Moab Desert"	Dominic Stobart	Terry Moore	November 10, 2006
Bear Grylls is dropped by a helicopter into the Moab Desert in Utah in almost 45 degree temperatures, with nothing but a knife, a canteen, and a flint. He battles dehydration by soaking his t-shirt in urine, and eats two raven eggs, one raw. Lastly, he demonstrates how to escape from quicksand before swimming across the Colorado River. He also explains how to use the flow of rivers as tools to find civilization.
3	3	"Costa Rican Rainforest"	Chris Richards	Jorge Salaverri Henriquez	November 17, 2006
Grylls parachutes into a Costa Rican rainforest in the Osa Peninsula, with only his knife and a canteen. He's careful about the water he drinks, but gets violently ill anyway. He climbs down a waterfall using a vine, and floats down a river to the ocean on a raft he crafts out of balsawood to demonstrate how someone lost in the jungle can make it to civilization. He encounters snakes, mosquitoes and dangerous river currents.
4	4	"European Alps"	Matt Dickinson	Mac MacKay	November 24, 2006
Bear Grylls shows viewers how to survive the Alps, Europe's greatest mountain range. 120 million people visit every year, thousands becoming stranded. Bear Grylls parachutes in and demonstrates specialty survival techniques.
5	5	"Mount Kilauea"	Dominic Stobart	Jack Lockwood	December 1, 2006
Grylls is dropped by helicopter at the top of Mount Kilauea. Made up of an expanse of solidified lava which stretches for 33,000 acres, this environment is one of the world's most inhospitable. He first traverses lava fields, which catch his boots on fire, then heads into the jungles of Hawaii. Grylls uses a kukui nut torch to explore a lava tube and finds water, then uses smoke to placate a bee hive to get honey. Ultimately, he finds the sea (and people) by following seabirds.
6	6	"Sierra Nevada"	Wayne Derrick	Mark Wienert	December 8, 2006
Bear travels to America's greatest mountain range-the Sierra Nevada. Bear uses his knowledge of American Indian survival techniques to build shelters, calm wild horses, and find food.
7	7	"African Savannah"	Marc Westcott	Phil West	December 15, 2006
Bear Grylls shows how to survive on the African Savannah by becoming a lost tourist. Every year 40 U.S. citizens die after being attacked by wild animals. Bear shows how to find water, avoid predators, and find food in this parched and dangerous environment.
8	8	"Alaskan Mountain Range"	Scott Tankard	Tim Smith	December 22, 2006
Bear Grylls faces the icy peaks of the Chugach Mountains, Alaska, one of the toughest known environments. Each year, over one million people visit and 500 become stranded. Bear uses his specialist survival skills and knowledge to journey across Alaska.
9	9	"Desert Island"	Graham Strong	Mark Wienert	December 29, 2006
Grylls is kicked out by helicopter into the water near a deserted island in the Pacific Ocean. He demonstrates long distance swimming, shelter building and coconut harvesting. Grylls builds a bamboo raft to look for ships, and is surrounded by tiger sharks. He fishes off his raft using a fish bone hook, and shows how to signal a ship using the reflection produced by his polished knife.
10	10	"Everglades"	Scott Tankard	Kris Thoemke	June 15, 2007
Grylls drops into the swamps of Florida's Everglades, where at least 60 tourists need to be rescued each year. He trudges through the swamp and shows how to construct shelter, deal with razor-sharp sawgrass, get out of a muddy sinkhole and avoid alligators and rattlesnakes. He eats frogs and cooks a turtle Seminole-style.
11	11	"Iceland"	Tony Lee	Thor Kjartansson & Sigrun Nikulasdottir & Jon Gauti Jonsson	June 22, 2007
Adventurer Bear Grylls shows how to survive in Iceland's Arctic conditions. Bear demonstrates how to make a snow cave, find water in deep tunnels, and avoid frostbite. Half million tourists visit every year to see the freezing glaciers.
12	12	"Mexico"	Scott Tankard	David Holladay	June 29, 2007
In Mexico's Copper Canyon Adventurer Bear Grylls demonstrates how to survive by using traditional cave shelters, fishing without lines or nets, and finding scorpions and grubs to eat.
13	13	"Kimberley, Australia"	Alexis Girardet	Nick Vroomans	July 6, 2007
Adventurer Bear Grylls demonstrates how to survive in the harsh Australian outback by taking extreme measures to avoid sun stroke, finding food, and avoiding the deadly 'Salties' - salt water crocodiles.
14	14	"Ecuador"	Matt Dickinson	Hazen Audel	July 13, 2007
Bear Grylls demonstrates how to survive in Ecuador's jungles by building bamboo bridges, making a bow and arrow, and showing which plants are poisonous.
15	15	"Scotland"	Clare Dornan	Lawrence Clark	July 20, 2007
Bear Grylls is in Scotland's Cairngorm Mountains where he has to face arctic blizzards, use a deer skin for shelter, and trap rabbits to eat.

=== Season 2 (2007–2008) ===
No. overall	No. in season	Title	Directed by	Survival expert(s)	Original release date
16	1	"Sahara" (Part 1)	Tony Lee	Kevan Palmer & Authentic Morocco	November 9, 2007
In the vastness of the Sahara desert and the terrifying beauty of towering sand dunes, Bear Grylls tackles extreme survival challenges as he shows what it takes to get out alive even when it means eating one of the world's deadliest scorpions.
17	2	"Desert Survivor" (Part 2)	Tony Lee	Kevan Palmer & Authentic Morocco	November 16, 2007
In the hottest place on earth, Bear Grylls shows how to get out alive as he tackles his biggest challenge yet - skinning and disemboweling a dead camel for water, food and shelter for a night under the stars.
18	3	"Panama" (Part 1)	Justin Kelly	Richard Cahill & Luis Puleio	November 23, 2007
Grylls travels to Panama, where he travels in the equatorial heat through mangrove swamps and rain forest, and endures more than 100 mosquito bites and one painful snake bite.
19	4	"Jungle" (Part 2)	Justin Kelly	Richard Cahill & Luis Puleio	November 30, 2007
In the lethal jungle of Panama, Bear Grylls tackles some extreme survival challenges and some grisly eats to show how to get out alive.
20	5	"Patagonia" (Part 1)	Carl Hindmarch	Daniel Gomez	December 7, 2007
In the icy wilderness of Patagonia, Bear Grylls tackles some extreme survival challenges and wild weather eating bugs and worms to show you how to stay alive.
21	6	"Andes Adventure" (Part 2)	Carl Hindmarch	Daniel Gomez	December 14, 2007
Bear Grylls shows viewers how to survive the grueling conditions of Patagonia in South America. He parachutes onto a windblown Steppe where there is little to eat and almost no shelter. Bear spends the night sleeping under a rock in freezing conditions.
22	7	"Bear Eats"	N/A	N/A	December 21, 2007
In this compilation episode, Grylls offers tips on dining in the wild, with some unusual offerings that are not necessarily palatable.
23	8	"Zambia"	Chris Richards	Andrew Wood	May 2, 2008
Bear Grylls ventures into the landlocked country of Zambia in Southern Africa. Before heading into the bush, he shows how to survive some of the world's biggest rapids.
24	9	"Namibia"	Chris Richards	Andrew Wood	May 9, 2008
Bear Grylls shows viewers how to survive in one of the hottest, emptiest and driest places on earth: Namibia. Bear eventually meets up with the masters of desert survival, the San Bushmen, who reveal their secrets for survival.
25	10	"Jungle Swamp" (Part 1)	Stephen Shearman	Andrew Wood	May 16, 2008
Bear Grylls goes into the Pacific Ring of Fire as he takes on a week of challenges in an area devastated by the 2004 Tsunami. He is dropped into the Indian Ocean and has to survive a week of challenges on a deserted island with no running water.
26	11	"Castaway" (Part 2)	Stephen Shearman	Andrew Wood	May 23, 2008
Dropped by helicopter, Grylls has to survive on a remote island located in Indonesia. He hunts for stingrays and land crabs while drinking whatever fresh clean rain water he may get. In the end he builds a small raft out of drift wood of bamboo and heads to the sea.
27	12	"Siberia" (Part 1)	Tony Lee	Lena Yakovleva & Sergey Gluhov	May 30, 2008
Bear Grylls parachutes into the Siberian tundra, one of the coldest and harshest places on earth, where he must survive extreme challenges. Battling temperatures of minus 30 degrees Fahrenheit, he must find shelter and food before night falls.
28	13	"Land of Ice" (Part 2)	Tony Lee	Lena Yakovleva & Sergey Gluhov	June 6, 2008
Bear is air lifted into the treacherous Sanyan mountains in Siberia. He meets the Tuvans; yak herder descended from Genghis Khan who have lived there for 20,000 years, and learns some survival techniques from these cold climate experts.

=== Season 3 (2008–2009) ===
No. overall	No. in season	Title	Directed by	Survival expert(s)	Original release date
29	1	"Baja Desert"	David O'Neil	Stani Groeneweg	August 6, 2008
Bear Grylls is in Baja, Mexico. He tackles overwhelming odds to survive the challenges of the desert. The biggest threat to his survival comes from a bee sting that swells his eyes closed. Half blinded he battles a deadly diamond-back rattlesnake.
30	2	"The Deep South"	Nicholas While	Jeff Galpin	August 27, 2008
Bear Grylls tackles the deadly swamps of the Deep South. He dodges alligator attacks, tangles with venomous snakes and uses his ingenuity to hook a catfish with his bare hands. He also follows the trail of destruction caused by Hurricane Katrina.
31	3	"Ireland"	Scott Tankard	Andrew Wood	September 3, 2008
Bear Grylls survives the rugged West Coast of Ireland where he has to scale 2000 ft high sea cliffs. Bear gets stuck in a peat bog retrieving a dead sheep for food and risks hypothermia when he's washed out of his shelter overnight by a rainstorm.
32	4	"South Dakota"	Chris Richards	Stani Groeneweg	September 10, 2008
Bear's latest adventure takes him to South Dakota, home to not one but three of America's most incredible wilderness areas: the Black Hills, the Great Plains, and the inhospitable Badlands.
33	5	"Bear's Essentials (Note: This episode is exclusive to TV broadcast and not available on digital distributions.)"	N/A	N/A	September 17, 2008
A clip-show from previous Man vs. Wild episodes highlighting important survival techniques.
34	6	"Belize"	Nick White	Stani Groeneweg	January 12, 2009
Bear Grylls is in the jungles of Belize where he plays Tarzan in the trees, comes face to face with a 9 foot boa constrictor and is left hanging by his fingertips over a raging white-water river.
35	7	"Yukon"	Nick White	Andrew Wood	January 19, 2009
Like the pioneers who came in search of gold, Bear fights his way across the frozen wastelands of North America's Yukon. He battles to stay afloat in treacherous white water and finds himself deep underground in an abandoned gold mine.
36	8	"Oregon"	Chris Richards	Stani Groeneweg	January 26, 2009
Deep in the Oregon wilderness, Bear takes on Hell's Canyon -- the deepest river canyon in the world. Huge snowdrifts, frozen lakes, burnt out forests, 150 foot clifts and the frigid white water rapids of the Snake River stand between him and civilization.
37	9	"Dominican Republic"	Carl Hindmarch	Andrew Wood	February 2, 2009
Bear Grylls eats a tarantula for breakfast and shows you how to survive hurricane season in the Dominican Republic.
38	10	"Turkey"	Andrew Barron	Andrew Wood	February 9, 2009
Bear Grylls heads for Turkey; from the freezing mountain tops to the lifeless Steppes, Bear battles white water rapids, takes on 100 foot climbs and confronts the locals; poisonous snakes and death stalker scorpions.
39	11	"Romania"	Stephen Shearman	Andrew Wood	February 16, 2009
Bear Grylls enters the heart of Dracula country; forest of Transylvania, where he encounters steep ravines, cavernous underground water systems, and comes face to face with a large adult brown bear.
40	12	"Bear's Ultimate Survival Guide Part 1"	N/A	N/A	February 23, 2009
From falling into the ice of Siberia, to battling sharks to make it off a desert island in Indonesia and skinning and eating snakes in the mangroves of Panama, Bear offers a guide to survival for the most dangerous of places in this compilation episode.

=== Season 4 (2009–2010) ===
No. overall	No. in season	Title	Directed by	Survival expert(s)	Original release date
41	1	"Arctic Circle"	Andrew Barron	Andrew Wood	August 12, 2009
Grylls goes to the Arctic Circle, where he encounters a frozen waterfall, wild reindeer and some of the coldest conditions on the planet.
42	2	"Alabama"	Nick White	Stani Groeneweg	August 19, 2009
Bear Grylls is deep in the back-woods of Alabama where he tackles freezing white-waters, comes face to face with a vicious wild boar, braves a raging forest fire, and gets trapped without light deep in the heart of an enormous limestone cave.
43	3	"Vietnam"	Sid Bennett	Andrew Wood	August 26, 2009
Deep in the heart of Vietnam, Bear Grylls encounters blood-sucking leeches, a deadly spitting cobra, eats a forest scorpion and avoids a violent mountain river flood as he tangles with the worst the jungle can throw at him.
44	4	"Texas"	Stephen Shearman	Stani Groeneweg	September 2, 2009
In Western Texas, Bear falls to earth from an upturned bi-plane, to lock horns with the parched Chihuahuan Desert; he traverses deep gorges, locates an oasis and takes on a diamond back rattlesnake.
45	5	"Alaska"	Nick White	Ross Bowyer	September 9, 2009
Bear Grylls is in the wilds of Alaska where he ice-hops onto a glacier, is left hanging by his fingertips over a forest waterfall and narrowly avoids getting crushed between an iceberg and his rescue vessel.
46	6	"Bear's Ultimate Survival Guide Part 2 (Note: On some digital distributions, this episode is in Season 3.)"	Unknown	N/A	September 16, 2009
In this compilation episode, Bear takes on some of the world's most dangerous snakes, fishes for catfish using his finger as bait and joins tribes who survive in the world's toughest terrains, eats raw goat's testicles in the Sahara, and hunts porcupines.
47	7	"The Inside Story"	Unknown	N/A	September 23, 2009
The Man vs. Wild crew who follow Grylls on his travels across the globe, tell how it feels to follow in his footsteps and reveal just how they make Man vs. Wild.
48	8	"Pacific Island"	Stephen Shearman	Ross Bowyer	January 6, 2010
On a deserted Panamanian island, Bear Grylls creates critical fresh water and uses tribal techniques to fish before taking his chances at sea on a homemade raft.
49	9	"China"	Graham Strong	Andrew Wood	January 13, 2010
Bear Grylls takes on Southern China in the aftermath of a typhoon. He tackles swollen rivers, climbs limestone gorges, is attacked by stinging ants, and uses ancient tribal techniques to catch bats for food.
50	10	"Big Sky Country"	Konrad Begg	Stani Groeneweg	January 20, 2010
Bear Grylls takes on Big Sky Country—paragliding above the Rockies, traversing vast gullies, and making the most of abandoned debris before making his great escape on a moving train.
51	11	"Guatemala"	Alexis Girardet	Ross Bowyer	January 27, 2010
Bear Grylls rappels onto a live volcano in Guatemala, navigates a waterfall in a cave, creates a nest to safely sleep in but gets an unwelcome bed buddy, and encounters ancient Mayan ruins.
52	12	"Urban Survivor"	Nick White	Andrew Wood	February 3, 2010
Bear Grylls finds himself in a new kind of jungle—a concrete jungle. Bear uses the same wilderness survival techniques to stay alive in a city post-disaster.
53	13	"Shooting Survival"	Ben Holder	N/A	February 10, 2010
Behind the scenes of Man vs Wild. Meet Bear's stalwart crew and follow along as they go to extremes to fearlessly—and sometimes fumblingly—film Bear trekking to the ends of the earth.
54	14	"North Africa"	Nick Fletcher	Ross Bowyer	February 17, 2010
In the North African Sahara, Bear gets creative finding water. He treks to the coast, catches an octopus, makes shelter with acacia trees, and eats a stomach-turning bug burger breakfast of locusts and moths.

=== Season 5 (2010) ===
No. overall	No. in season	Title	Directed by	Survival expert(s)	Original release date
55	1	"Western Pacific"	Nick White	Stani Groeneweg	August 11, 2010
Bear Grylls is marooned on a desert island somewhere south of Papua New Guinea. He wades across a shark-infested tidal channel, climbs crumbling volcanic cliffs, leaps over a 100-foot death drop, and constructs a bamboo windsurfer to make his escape.
56	2	"Northern Australia"	David O'Neil	Ross Bowyer	August 18, 2010
Bear Grylls skydives from a wartime cargo plane into Australia's Northern Territory. He will rely on many of the survival skills honed by the aboriginal people who live in Arnhemland to survive in this sweltering landscape where 100,000 crocodiles rule.
57	3	"Canadian Rockies"	Scott Tankard	Andrew Wood	August 25, 2010
While in the Canadian Rockies, Bear is buried alive in an avalanche, swims long distance beneath an ice-covered lake, and is airvac-ed to the hospital when an icy glissade goes horribly wrong.
58	4	"Georgian Republic"	Stephen Shearman	Andrew Wood	September 1, 2010
Bear Grylls begins his adventure in the snow-capped Caucasus Mountains of the Georgian Republic by driving a snowmobile out the back of a hovering helicopter. He ziplines across a river, camps among wolves, and trudges swampy wetlands.
59	5	"Fan vs. Wild"	Hugh Ballentyne	Ross Bowyer	September 8, 2010
Bear takes two fans into the Canadian wilderness for their ultimate survival challenge. They'll face their fears head on, trek down dangerous glaciers and across a frigid glacial river, build a rustic shelter, and try to swallow typical Bear fare.
60	6	"Extreme Desert"	Stephen Shearman	Ross Bowyer	September 15, 2010
In the Mojave Desert, Bear puts himself in the path of a man-made sandstorm takes on the full force of a flashflood and jumps form 30,000 feet; his body is pushed to the limit as the temperature soars from minus 40 to one hundred and ten degrees Fahrenheit.
61	7	"Behind the Wild"	Ben Duncan	N/A	September 22, 2010
Take a look at the person who films Bears leaping from helicopters, crossing crocodile infested rivers, sliding down ice falls and generally risk life and limb. In this behind the scenes viewers get the chance to meet the team and see how they stay in one piece.

=== Season 6 (2011) ===
No. overall	No. in season	Title	Directed by	Survival expert(s)	Original release date
62	1	"Arizona Sky Islands"	David Holroyd	Ross Bowyer	February 17, 2011
Bear Grylls is in Arizona, land of the Apache, showing how to survive in its hundred thousand square miles of scorching deserts and freezing mountains.
63	2	"Cape Wrath"	Stephen Shearman	Stani Groeneweg	February 24, 2011
Bear is in Scotland off the coast around Cape Wrath. Spotting a dead seal on the rocks, Bear fashions a wetsuit from its hide and faces a chilly swim. He has a close call with a deadly rock fall before making camp in an old, upturned boat.
64	3	"Norway: Edge of Survival"	Ben Duncan	Andrew Wood	March 3, 2011
Bear and his team are in Norway. Armed with the latest technology, they'll be creating the harshest conditions possible while sensors monitor how Bear copes trying to survive in one of the world's most beautiful but wettest countries.
65	4	"Borneo Jungle"	David Johnson	Stanislaw Groeneweg	March 10, 2011
After rappelling into the forbidding Borneo jungle, Bear Grylls must descend soaking wet cliffs, battle snakes and leeches and deal with torrential rain to survive here.
66	5	"Malaysia Archipelago"	Hugh Ballantyne	Andrew Wood	March 17, 2011
Bear Grylls is dropped in an archipelago of islands off the coast of Borneo. Fighting dense jungle and scaling towering escarpments, Bear struggles to find freshwater. In his search for food, he tries to spear fish at depths of 20ft and traps a wild boar.
67	6	"Global Survival Guide"	N/A	N/A	March 24, 2011
Bear Grylls travels the world to give you the best tips and techniques so you can survive wherever you're stranded. From skin diving without a mask in the tropics, to finding water in the desert, this is the best of Bear's never before seen footage.

=== Season 7 (2011) ===
No. overall	No. in season	Title	Directed by	Survival expert(s)	Original release date
68	1	"Men vs. Wild With Jake Gyllenhaal"	David Johnson	Andrew Wood	July 11, 2011
Bear brings along actor Jake Gyllenhaal, to test how he measures up to unpredictable and unforgiving Mother Nature. Jake will go where Bear goes and eat whatever Bear eats, if he's going to cope with some of the worst conditions known to man.
69	2	"New Zealand: South Island"	Matt Brandon	Andrew Wood	July 18, 2011
Bear Grylls must fling himself out of a plane and parachute to safety to reach this remote area. Crossing the country's highest mountain range and starting a fire in a waterlogged forest are just some of the unpredictable things he faces in this terrain.
70	3	"Iceland: Land Of Fire And Ice"	Ben Duncan	Andrew Wood	July 25, 2011
Bear Grylls is dropped on an ice cap covering an active volcano. In blizzard conditions he struggles to make headway, and the barren land offers little food. Can he reach civilization when faced with swollen river crossings and ever present flash floods?
71	4	"Utah: Red Rock Country"	Nick White	Ross Bowyer	August 12, 2011
Bear Grylls is in red rock country - southern Utah. Armed only with a lasso, he descends a rock pinnacle and gets trapped in a narrow gorge. Crossing an arid wilderness, he's left hanging 100 ft above a ravine. And Bear's craziest airplane stunt ever.
72	5	"New Zealand: Land Of The Maori"	Stephen Shearman	Ross Bowyer	August 19, 2011
Over 100 people drown each year in New Zealand, and Bear must cross a raging river on a tree trunk to head toward civilization. On his journey to safety he runs out of water, is forced to climb up active volcanic ranges and scale down a waterfall.
73	6	"Working The Wild"	N/A	N/A	November 29, 2011
Bear Grylls takes the viewer behind the scenes to meet the crew that follows his every step. Whether he's jumping from helicopters or eating the unimaginable, the camera is never far away from the action. Now the crew gets to tell their side of the story.

== Special episodes ==
No.	Title	Survival expert(s)	Original release date
1	"Bear's Mission Everest Special"	N/A	September 11, 2007
In this special, Bear attempts his most daring mission to date when he tries to fly a paramotor glider over the world's highest mountain.
2	"Arctic Tundra"	Andrew Wood	June 2, 2009
This episode features Will Ferrell in a special titled Men vs. Wild, where Ferrell tags along with Grylls as they journey through the frozen wilderness of Sweden. The episode is a tie-in to help promote Ferrell's new movie, Land of the Lost.
3	"Bear's Top 25 Man Moments"	N/A	June 19, 2010
Grylls reveals his top 25 moments - he sleeps in a camel in the northern Sahara and takes on a risky drop off onto an active volcano in Guatemala.
4	"Man vs. Wild with Bear Grylls and Prime Minister Modi"	N/A	August 12, 2019
Grylls appeared with Indian Prime Minister, Narendra Modi in a special episode shot in the India's Jim Corbett National Park, Uttarakhand.
