= Bear Grylls =

British adventurer and television presenter (born 1974)

Bear Grylls OBE
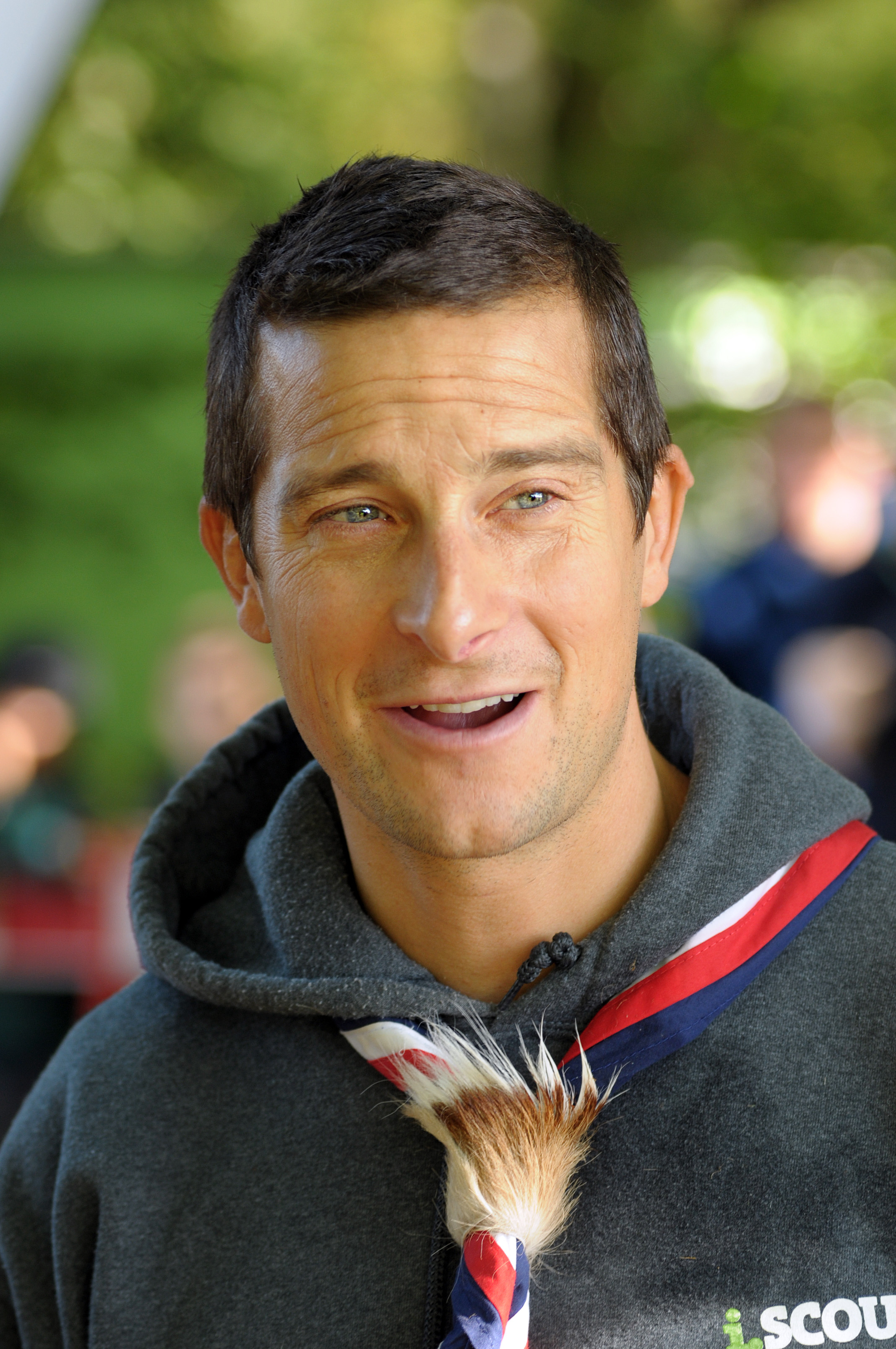
- Grylls at a meeting with Coventry Scouts groups in 2012
- Born: Edward Michael Grylls; 7 June 1974 (age 52); Donaghadee, County Down, Northern Ireland
- Education: Eton College; University of the West of England; Birkbeck College
- Occupations: Adventurer; Author; Television presenter; Motivational speaker
- Spouse: Shara Cannings Knight (m. 2000)
- Children: 3
- Father: Michael Grylls
- Military career
- Allegiance: United Kingdom
- Branch: British Army
- Service years: 1994–1997
- Rank: Trooper
- Unit: 21 SAS(R)
- Website: beargrylls.com

Edward Michael "Bear" Grylls (/ɡrɪlz/; born 7 June 1974) is a British adventurer, television presenter and former SAS trooper. He holds several world records in hostile environments, and appeared in numerous wilderness survival television series including Man vs. Wild (2006–2011), Running Wild with Bear Grylls (2014–2023) and The Island with Bear Grylls (2014–2019).

In July 2009, Grylls was appointed as The Scout Association's youngest-ever Chief Scout of the United Kingdom and Overseas Territories at the age of 35. He held the post until September 2024, becoming the second-longest-serving Chief Scout after Robert Baden-Powell.

== Early life ==
Grylls was born in Donaghadee, Northern Ireland, on 7 June 1974. He is the son of Conservative politician Sir Michael Grylls and his wife Sarah "Sally" (née Ford). Her mother Patricia (née Smiles), was briefly an MP, succeeding her father; later she married an MP. Grylls has one sibling, an elder sister, Lara Fawcett, who gave him the nickname "Bear" when he was a week old. His family has a strong cricketing background, his grandfather Neville Ford and great-great-grandfather William Augustus Ford having both been first-class cricketers.

He lived in Donaghadee until the age of four, when his family moved to Bembridge on the Isle of Wight. From an early age, he learned to climb and sail with his father, who was a member of the Royal Yacht Squadron. As a teenager, he learned to skydive and earned a second dan black belt in Shotokan karate. He speaks English, Spanish, German and French. He is an Anglican, and has described his Christian faith as the "backbone" in his life: "You can't keep God out. He's all around us, if we're just still enough to listen."

== Education ==
Grylls was educated at Eaton House, Ludgrove School and Eton College, where he helped start its first mountaineering club. He studied Spanish and German at the University of the West of England, Bristol, and at Birkbeck College, where he graduated with a 2:2 bachelor's degree, obtained part-time, in Hispanic studies in 2002.

== Military service ==
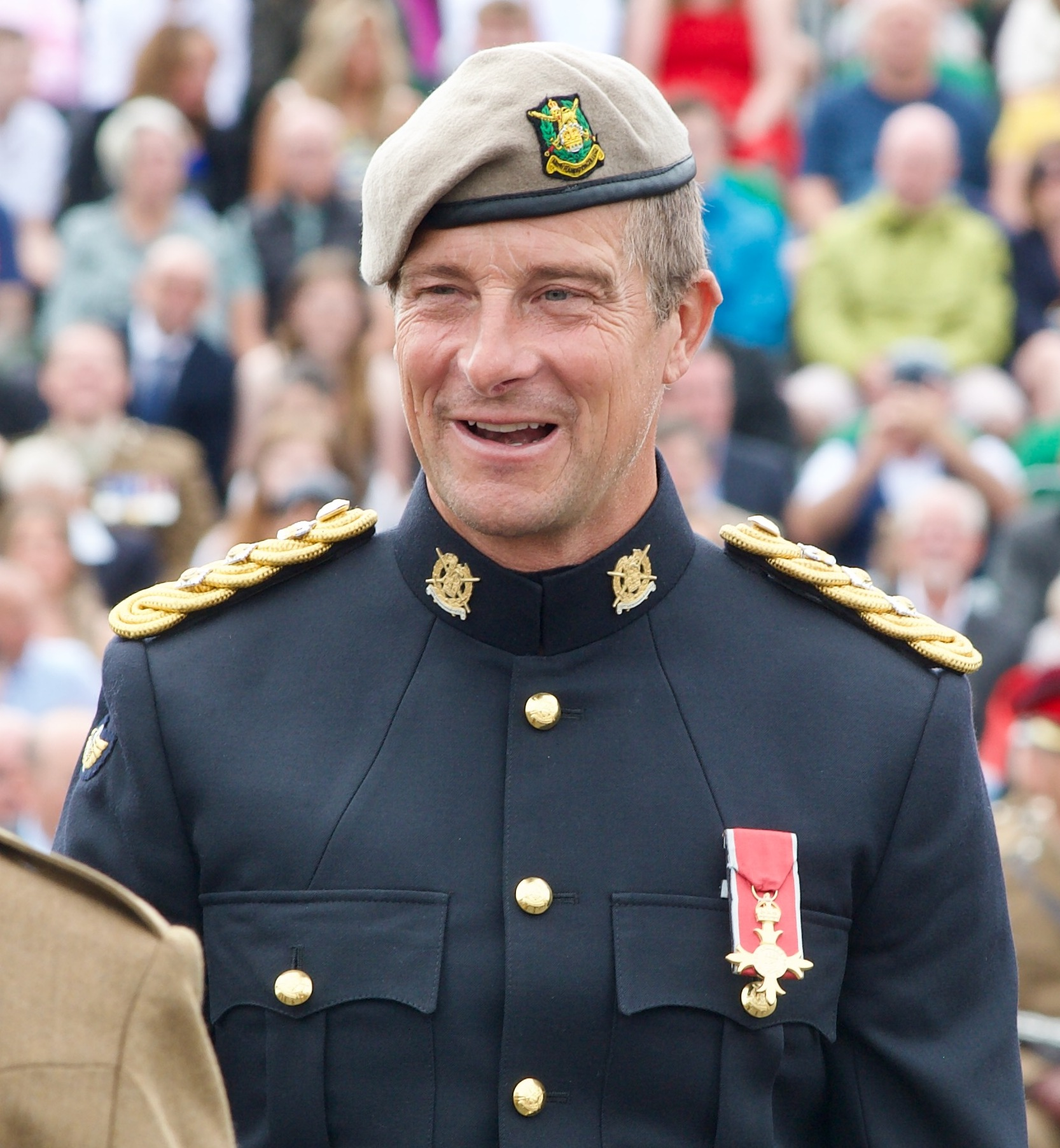
Grylls inspecting junior soldiers passing out of AFC Harrogate in 2024

After leaving school, Grylls hiked in the Himalayan mountains of Sikkim and West Bengal. From 1994 to 1997, he served in the Territorial Army with 21 SAS as a trooper. His time in the SAS ended as the result of a free fall parachuting accident in Zambia in 1996; his parachute failed to open, causing him to break three vertebrae. At 16,000 ft (4900 m), his fall is one of the highest falls survived without a parachute.

In 2004, Grylls was awarded the honorary rank of lieutenant commander in the Royal Naval Reserve. Then in 2013 he was awarded the honorary rank of lieutenant colonel in the Royal Marines Reserve, and promoted to honorary colonel in June 2021. In April 2024, Grylls was appointed honorary colonel of the Army Foundation College, serving as a figurehead for the college, a role once held by Captain Tom Moore. As such, he was granted a commission in the British Army as a local colonel for the duration of the appointment.

== Expeditions ==
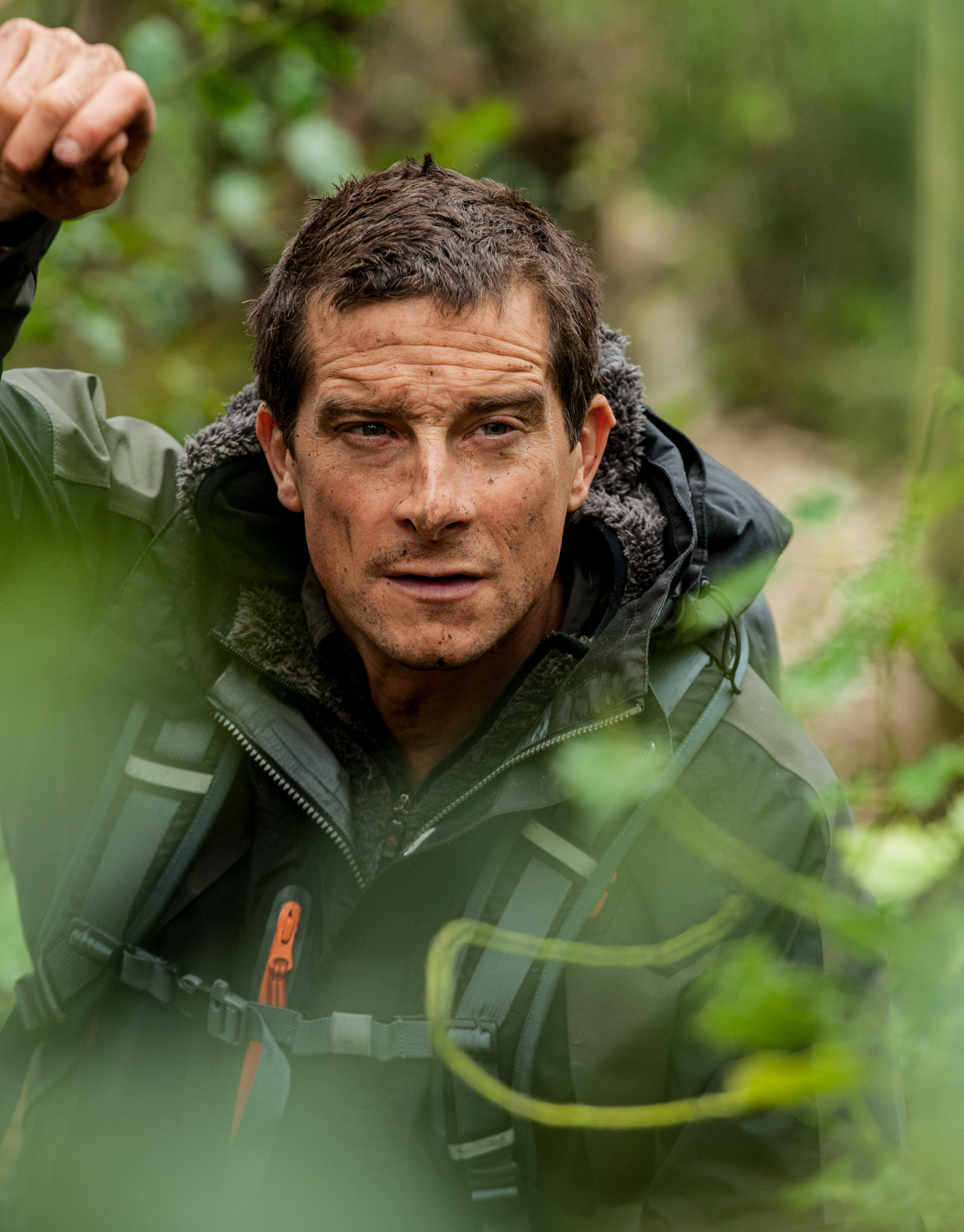
Grylls in 2014

=== Everest ===
On 16 May 1998, Grylls achieved his childhood dream of climbing to the summit of Mount Everest in Nepal, 18 months after breaking three vertebrae in a parachuting accident. At 23, he was at the time among the youngest people to have achieved this feat. There is some dispute over whether he was the youngest Briton to have done so, as he was preceded by James Allen, a climber holding dual Australian and British citizenship, who reached the summit in 1995 at age 22. The record has since been surpassed by Jake Meyer and then Rob Gauntlett who summitted at age 19. To prepare for climbing at such high altitudes in the Himalayas, in 1997, Grylls became the youngest Briton to climb Ama Dablam, a peak once described by Sir Edmund Hillary as "unclimbable", although now the third most popular in the Himalayas for permitted expeditions.

=== Circumnavigation of the UK ===
In 2000, Grylls led the team to circumnavigate the British Isles on jet skis, taking about 30 days, to raise money for the Royal National Lifeboat Institution (RNLI). He also rowed naked in a homemade bathtub along the Thames to raise funds for a friend who lost his legs in a climbing accident.

=== Crossing the North Atlantic ===
In 2003, he led a team of five, including his childhood friend, SAS colleague, and Mount Everest climbing partner Mick Crosthwaite, on an unassisted crossing of the north Atlantic Ocean, in an open rigid inflatable boat. Grylls and his team travelled in an eleven-metre-long boat and encountered force 8 gale winds with waves breaking over the boat while passing through icebergs in their journey from Halifax, Nova Scotia to John o' Groats, Scotland.

=== Dinner party at altitude ===
In 2005, alongside the balloonist and mountaineer David Hempleman-Adams and Lieutenant Commander Alan Veal, leader of the Royal Navy Freefall Parachute Display Team, Grylls created a world record for the highest open-air formal dinner party, which they did under a hot-air balloon at 7,600 metres (25,000 ft), dressed in full mess dress and oxygen masks. To train for the event, he made over 200 parachute jumps. This event was in aid of The Duke of Edinburgh's Award and the King's Trust.

=== Paramotoring over the Himalayas ===
In 2007, Grylls embarked on a record-setting Parajet paramotor in Himalayas near Mount Everest. He took off from 4,400 metres (14,500 ft), 8 miles (13 km) south of the mountain. Grylls reported looking down on the summit during his ascent and coping with temperatures of −60 °C (−76 °F). He endured dangerously low oxygen levels and eventually reached 9,000 metres (29,500 ft), almost 3,000 metres (10,000 ft) higher than the previous record of 6,102 metres (20,019 ft). The feat was filmed for Discovery Channel worldwide as well as Channel 4 in the UK. While Grylls initially planned to cross over Everest itself, the permit was only to fly to the south of Everest, and he did not traverse Everest out of risk of violating Chinese airspace.

=== Journey Antarctica 2008 ===
In 2008, Grylls led a team of four to climb one of the most remote unclimbed peaks in the world in Antarctica, to raise funds for children's charity Global Angels and promote the use of alternative energies. During this mission the team also aimed to explore the coast of Antarctica by inflatable boat and jetski, part powered by bioethanol, and then to travel across some of the vast ice desert by wind-powered kite-ski and electric powered paramotor. However, the expedition was cut short after Grylls suffered a broken shoulder while kite skiing across a stretch of ice. Travelling at speeds up to 50 km/h (30 mph), a ski caught on the ice, launching him in the air and breaking his shoulder when he came down. He had to be medically evacuated.

=== Longest indoor freefall ===
Grylls, along with the double amputee Al Hodgson and the Scotsman Freddy MacDonald, set a Guinness world record in 2008 for the longest continuous indoor freefall. The previous record was 1 hour 36 minutes by a US team. Grylls, Hodgson, and MacDonald, using a vertical wind tunnel in Milton Keynes, broke the record by a few seconds. The attempt was in support of the charity Global Angels.

=== Northwest Passage expedition ===
In September 2010, Grylls led a team of five to take an ice-breaking rigid-inflatable boat (RIB) through 5,700 nautical miles (10,600 km) of the ice-strewn Northwest Passage. The expedition intended to raise awareness of the effects of global warming and to raise money for children's charity Global Angels.

== Career ==
=== Books ===
Grylls's first book, Facing Up (UK)/The Kid Who Climbed Everest (US), described his expedition and achievements climbing to the summit of Mount Everest. His second was Facing the Frozen Ocean. His third book Born Survivor: Bear Grylls was written to accompany the TV series of the same name. He also wrote an extreme guide to outdoor pursuits, titled Bear Grylls Outdoor Adventures.

In 2011, Grylls released his autobiography, Mud, Sweat and Tears: The Autobiography, followed by A Survival Guide for Life in late 2012 and True Grit in 2013.

Grylls also wrote the Mission Survival series of children's adventure survival books titled: Mission Survival: Gold of the Gods, Mission Survival: Way of the Wolf, Mission Survival: Sands of the Scorpion, Mission Survival: Tracks of the Tiger and Mission Survival: Claws of the Crocodile. He has written two thriller novels based around his character Will Jaeger; Ghost Flight released in 2015 and Burning Angels in 2016.

In 2019, Grylls published a Christian devotional titled Soul Fuel.

In October 2021, Grylls released his second autobiography, Never Give Up; covering some of his most memorable events and adventures.

In 2022, Grylls published Mind Fuel: Simple Ways to Build Mental Resilience Every Day. Grylls told The Christian Post that it "offers honest and practical ways to practice better mental health... a crucial part of living a healthy, God-glorying life."

In April 2023, Grylls released You Vs the World: The Bear Grylls Guide to Never Giving Up; a motivational book aimed at children.

In September 2023, How to be a Scout, was released by Grylls.

In June 2025, Grylls released The Greatest Story Ever Told: An Eyewitness Account, a retelling of the story of Jesus told from five different first-person perspectives. The book became No.1 on Sunday Times Bestseller list in the UK.

=== Television ===
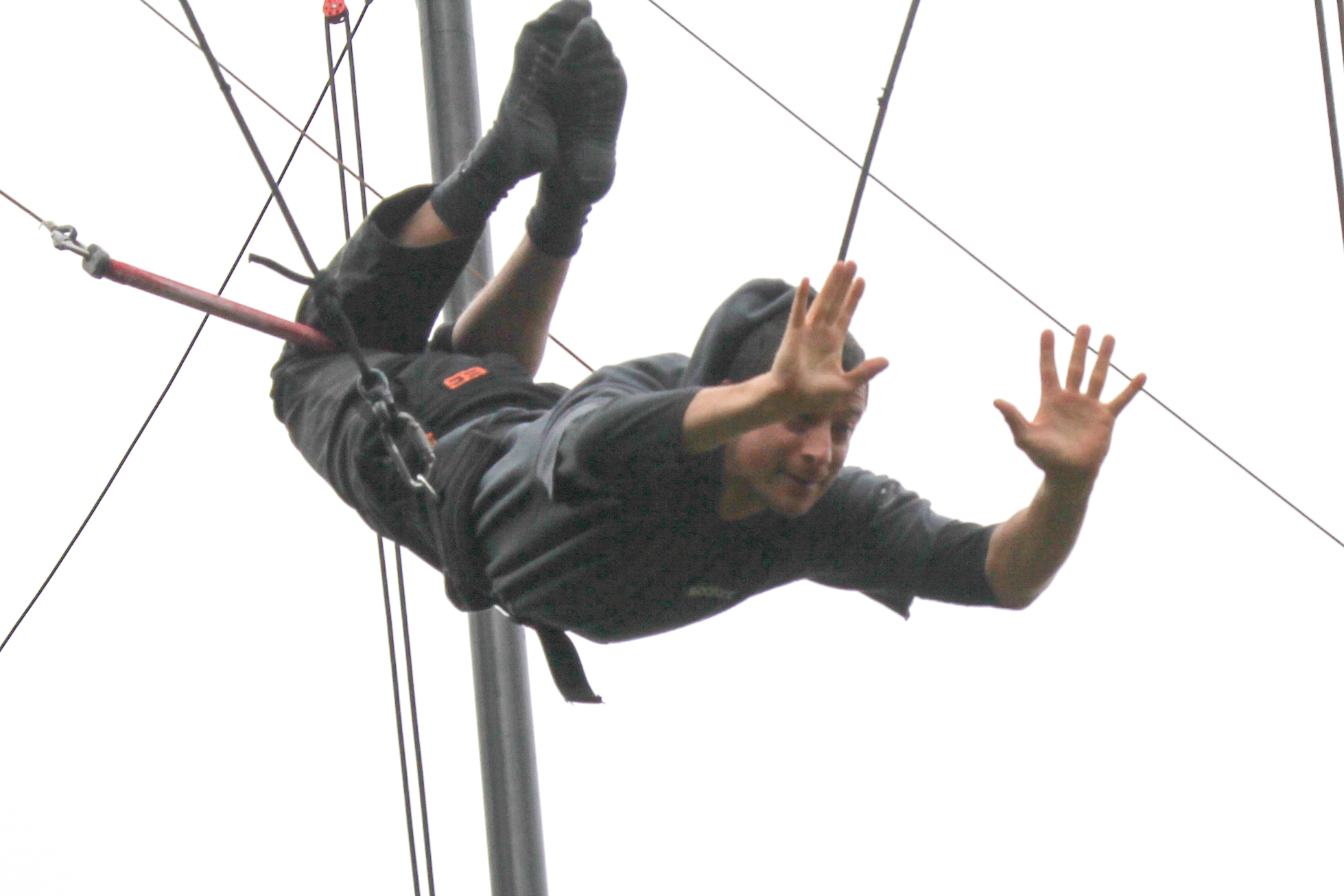
Bear Grylls on a flying trapeze in 2016 during a Bush Scout UK event

Grylls was used by the UK Ministry of Defence to head the Army's anti-drugs TV campaign, and featured in the first ever major advertising campaign for Harrods. Grylls has been a guest on numerous talk shows including Friday Night with Jonathan Ross, The Oprah Winfrey Show, Late Night with Conan O'Brien, The Tonight Show with Jay Leno, Attack of the Show!, Late Show with David Letterman, Jimmy Kimmel Live! and Harry Hill's TV Burp. Grylls recorded two advertisements for Post's Trail Mix Crunch Cereal, which aired in the US from January 2009. He also appeared as a "distinguished instructor" in Dos Equis' Most Interesting Academy in a webisode named "Survival in the Modern Era". He appeared in a five-part web series that demonstrates urban survival techniques and features Grylls going from bush to bash. He also has marketed the Alpha Course, a course on the basics of the Christian faith. In 2013, Grylls appeared in an airline safety video for Air New Zealand entitled Bear Essentials of Safety, filmed against the backdrop of the Routeburn Track on the southern tip of New Zealand's South Island. In 2014, Grylls appeared on Piers Morgan's Life Stories.

==== Escape to the Legion ====
Grylls filmed a four-part TV show in 2005, called Escape to the Legion, which followed Grylls and eleven other "recruits" as they took part in a shortened re-creation of the French Foreign Legion's basic desert training in the Sahara. The show was first broadcast in the UK on Channel 4, and in the US on the Military Channel.

==== Born Survivor/Man vs. Wild ====
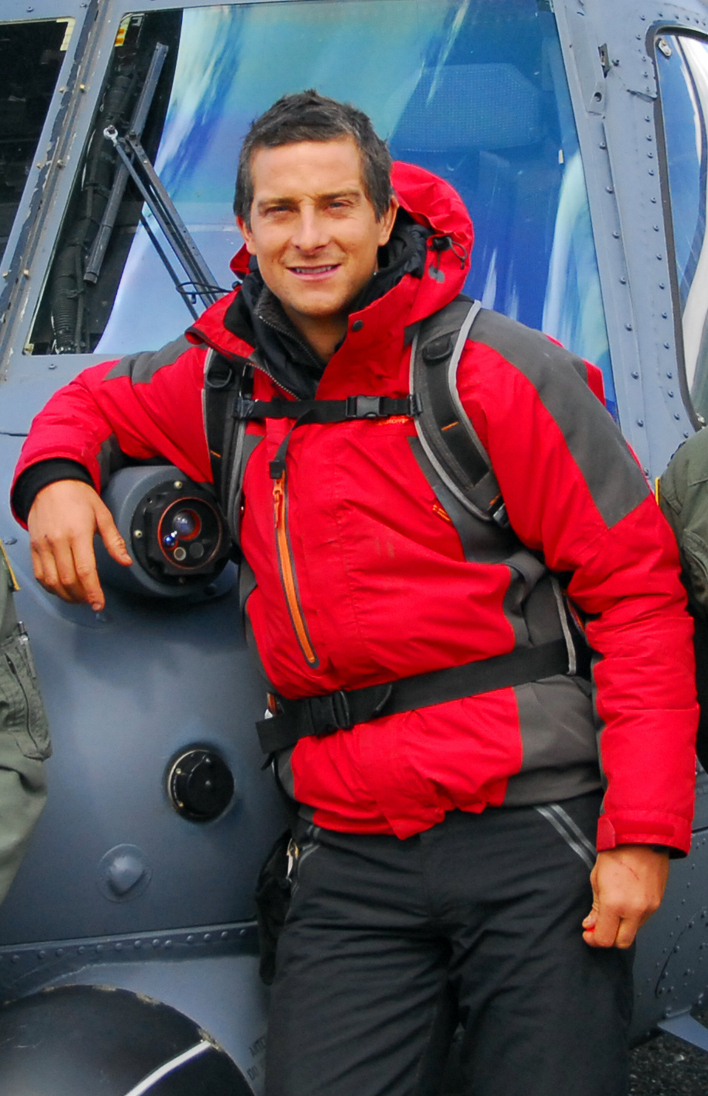
Grylls in front of an Alaska Air National Guard, 210th Rescue Squadron HH-60 Pave Hawk helicopter before heading out to Spencer Glacier to film Man vs. Wild

Grylls hosts a series titled Born Survivor: Bear Grylls for the British Channel 4 and broadcast as Man vs. Wild in Australia, New Zealand, Canada, India, and the United States, and as Ultimate Survival on the Discovery Channel in Europe, Asia, and Africa. The series features Grylls dropped into inhospitable places, showing viewers how to survive. Man vs. Wild debuted in 2006, and its success led it to lasting seven seasons over five years.

The show has featured stunts including Grylls climbing cliffs, parachuting from helicopters, balloons, and planes, paragliding, ice climbing, running through a forest fire, wading rapids, eating snakes, wrapping his urine-soaked T-shirt around his head to help stave off the desert heat, drinking urine saved in a rattlesnake skin, drinking fecal liquid from elephant dung, eating deer droppings, wrestling alligators, field dressing a camel carcass and drinking water from it, eating various "creepy crawlies" (insects), using the corpse of a sheep as a sleeping bag and flotation device, free climbing waterfalls and using a bird guano/water enema for hydration.

The show caused controversy after a programme consultant revealed that Grylls actually stayed in a hotel on some nights — including an episode in Hawaii in which Grylls was ostensibly stranded on a deserted island — and that certain scenes were staged for him. Grylls subsequently told viewers, "If people felt misled … I'm really sorry for that."

In March 2012, the Discovery Channel dropped Grylls from its line-up because of a contractual dispute, although he has worked with them again.

In August 2019, Bear Grylls appeared with Indian Prime Minister, Narendra Modi in a special episode shot in the India's Jim Corbett National Park, Uttarakhand. The episode was showcased in more than 180 countries across the world on the Discovery, Inc. network.

==== Worst-Case Scenario ====
In 2010, Grylls came out with a new project titled Worst-Case Scenario which aired on Discovery in the US. It is based on the popular books of the same name. Twelve episodes were produced before the show was cancelled.

==== Bear's Wild Weekend ====
In 2011, he made two specials under the title Bear's Wild Weekend for Channel 4 in the UK which was broadcast over the Christmas holiday that year. Each special featured Grylls taking either Jonathan Ross or Miranda Hart on short two-day adventures; Ross to rainforest in the Canary Islands, Hart to the Swiss Alps. These screened in the US under the title Bear Grylls' Wild Adventure. A third episode with Stephen Fry, this time in the Dolomite mountains of South Tyrol, screened in late 2013.

In 2014, two further episodes were aired in the UK under the title Wild Weekends. The first of these was the 2011 special of Man vs. Wild featuring Jake Gyllenhaal, and the second was the Running Wild episode featuring Ben Stiller.

==== Get Out Alive ====
Grylls hosted Get Out Alive with Bear Grylls, a reality competition series filmed in New Zealand, which premiered on NBC on 8 July 2013.

==== Escape from Hell ====
In Bear Grylls: Escape from Hell, he reveals the true life stories of ordinary people trapped in extraordinary situations of survival. The six-episode series premiered on the Discovery Channel in the UK on 4 October 2013, and in the US on 11 November 2013.

==== The Island ====
He presented The Island with Bear Grylls, first shown on Channel 4 on 5 May 2014. An American version of the show was also made and it premiered on 25 May 2015 on NBC.

==== Running Wild with Bear Grylls ====
In this adventure TV series from NBC, which premiered on 28 July 2014, Grylls takes celebrities on a two-day trip in the wilderness. The celebrities who took part in Season 1 are Zac Efron, Ben Stiller, Tamron Hall, Deion Sanders, Channing Tatum, and Tom Arnold. Celebrities who took part in Season 2 were Kate Winslet, Kate Hudson, Drew Brees, Jesse Tyler Ferguson, Ed Helms, Michelle Rodriguez, Ajay Devgan, Akshay Kumar, Rajanikanth, India's prime minister Narendra Modi, James Marsden, Michael B. Jordan, and President Barack Obama.

For the 2026 season the show moved to Fox and rebranded as Bear Grylls Is Running Wild.

==== Mission Survive ====
In 2015, he began presenting the six-part ITV series Bear Grylls: Mission Survive which features eight celebrities on a twelve-day survival mission. The series began airing on 20 February 2015. Mission Survive returned for a second series in 2016.

==== Bear Grylls Survival School ====
In 2016, he presented a CITV series called Bear Grylls Survival School. Filming started in August 2015. The series began airing on 10 January 2016. A second series was scheduled to begin on 7 January 2017.

==== Survivor Games ====
In 2015, China's Dragon TV partnered with Bear Grylls for an adventure series called Survivor Games. The show featured Grylls and eight celebrities from China, Hong Kong and Taiwan, and premiered on 16 October 2015.

==== Bear's Mission ====
In 2018, ITV began airing a new series similar to the USA series Running Wild with Bear Grylls called Bear's Mission with... This show focuses on one British celebrity taking an overnight adventure with Bear each episode. The series premiered on ITV in early 2018.

==== You vs. Wild ====
Later, Grylls went on to release an interactive series on streaming service Netflix.

==== World's Toughest Race: Eco-Challenge Fiji ====
Grylls presented the revival of the Eco-Challenge series, which is titled World's Toughest Race: Eco-Challenge Fiji. It involved teams from around the world competing in an adventure race, which took place in Fiji. The series premiered on Amazon Prime Video on 14 August 2020.

==== Bear Grylls Wild Adventure ====
Spring 2021, two-part ITV series featuring Jonny Wilkinson and Nicola Adams, respectively.

==== Running Wild with Bear Grylls: The Challenge ====
Premiered in July 2022, it is a spin-off of Grylls's long running Running Wild with Bear Grylls series. The series returned for a second season on 9 July 2023.

==== Bear Grylls Meets President Zelenskyy ====
In this documentary that aired on Channel 4 on 28 March 2023, Grylls travels to Ukraine to meet President Zelenskyy and to meet civilians caught up in the war with Russia.

==== I Survived Bear Grylls ====
Eight-part competition series; co-hosted with comedian Jordan Conley.

==== Celebrity Bear Hunt ====
An eight-part reality competition series starring Grylls, and presented by Holly Willoughby. The series premiered on Netflix in February 2025.

==== Bear Grylls: Wild Reckoning ====
A sixteen-part series for the BBC addressing family and friendship relationship issues with therapeutic solutions including survivalist challenges. It began broadcast on 23 February 2026.

=== Motivational speaking ===
Outside of TV, Grylls works as a motivational speaker, giving speeches worldwide to corporations, churches, schools, and other organisations.

=== Be Military Fit ===
Bear Grylls Ventures and NM Capital purchased British Military Fitness in September 2018 and re-branded as "Be Military Fit with Bear Grylls", to retain the existing abbreviation BMF. The company runs outdoor group fitness classes in 140 public parks and outdoor spaces across the United Kingdom. The classes are led by former or serving members of the British Armed Forces with recognised fitness training qualifications. It is Europe's largest outdoor fitness company.

== Charity and politics ==
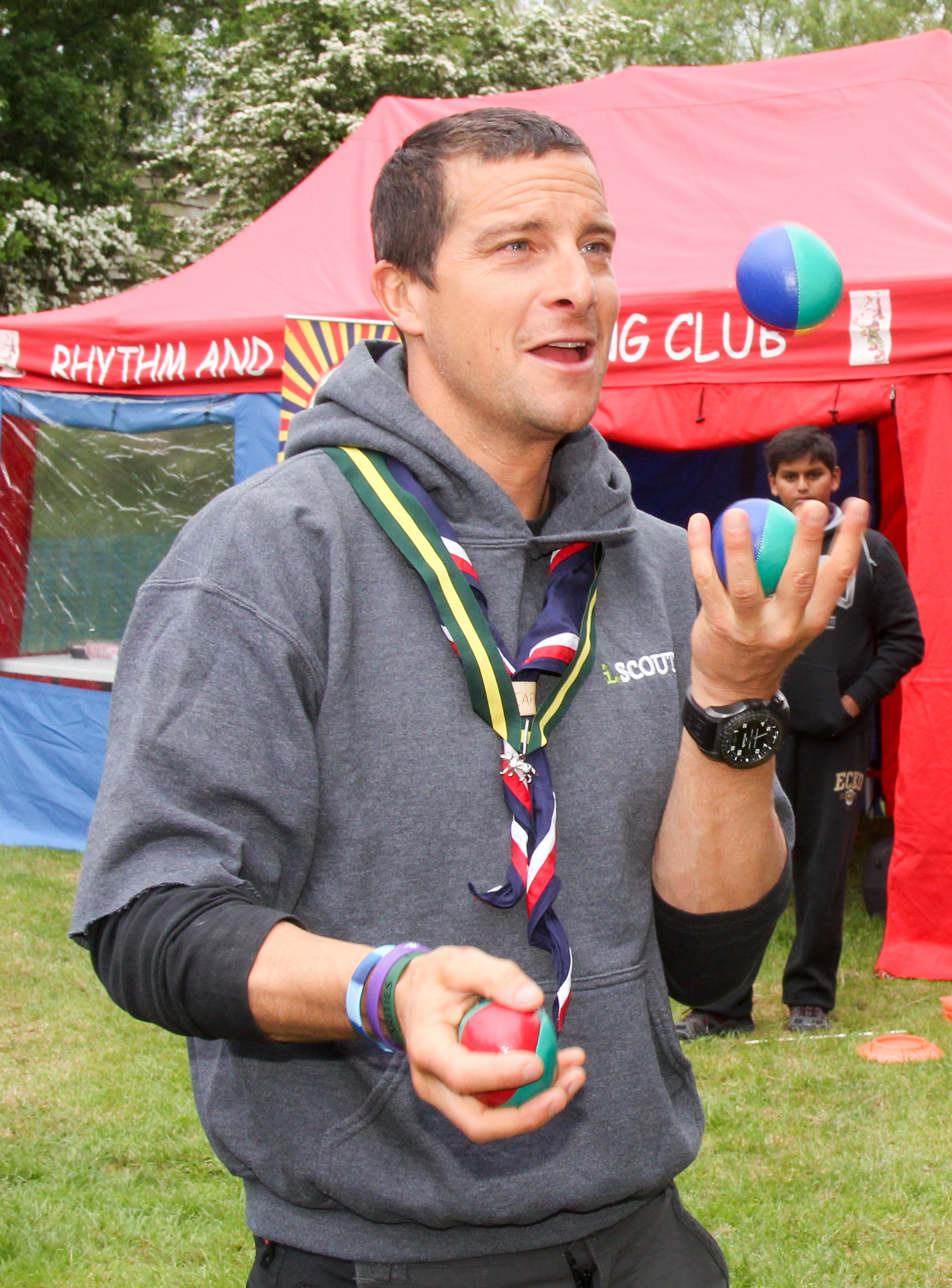
Grylls juggling in 2016

Grylls is an ambassador for the King's Trust, an organisation which provides training, financial, and practical support to young people in the United Kingdom.

Global Angels, a UK charity which seeks to aid children around the world, were the beneficiaries of his 2007 accomplishment of taking a powered para-glider higher than Mount Everest. Grylls held the highest ever dinner party at 7,600 metres (25,000 ft) in aid of The Duke of Edinburgh's Award Scheme, and launched the 50th anniversary of the Awards. His successful circumnavigation of Britain on jet skis raised money for the Royal National Lifeboat Institution.

Grylls's Everest climb was in aid of SSAFA Forces Help, a British-based charitable organisation which helps former and serving members of the British Armed Forces and their families and dependents. His 2003 Arctic expedition detailed in the book Facing the Frozen Ocean was in aid of the King's Trust. His 2005 attempt to para-motor over the Angel Falls was in aid of the charity Hope and Homes for Children.

In August 2010, Grylls continued his fund-raising work for Global Angels by undertaking an expedition through the Northwest Passage in a rigid inflatable boat. Many of his expeditions also support environmental causes such as his Antarctica expedition and his circumnavigation of Britain which tested a pioneering new fuel made from rubbish. In 2011, Grylls was in New Zealand during the February 2011 Christchurch earthquake. Following the incident, he appeared on New Zealand advertisements encouraging people to donate money to help rebuild the city.

Grylls is also an ambassador for Care for Children, an organisation that partners with governments in Asia to help create a positive alternative to institutional care through local family-based care for disadvantaged children. In 2014, Grylls designed a Scouts-themed Paddington Bear statue, one of fifty located around London prior to the release of the film Paddington, which was auctioned to raise funds for the National Society for the Prevention of Cruelty to Children (NSPCC).

Grylls said he spoke "from the heart" in backing "Remain" in the 2016 referendum. "At such a time for the UK to retreat, run and cut ourselves loose from Europe, when there are so many challenges on our doorstep, to me just doesn't feel either courageous or kind," he said. "Europe has many flaws, but I also believe the way to help resolve many of those tough issues is from within... I have never been a good quitter and I am so proud of the UK and our values: tolerance, kindness, respect, courage and resilience. This is why I want us to stay together and Remain in Europe." In January 2020, he announced that he had asserted his right to Irish citizenship and had obtained an Irish passport.

Grylls was appointed Officer of the Order of the British Empire (OBE) in the 2019 Birthday Honours for services to young people, the media and charity.

=== Positions in Scouting ===
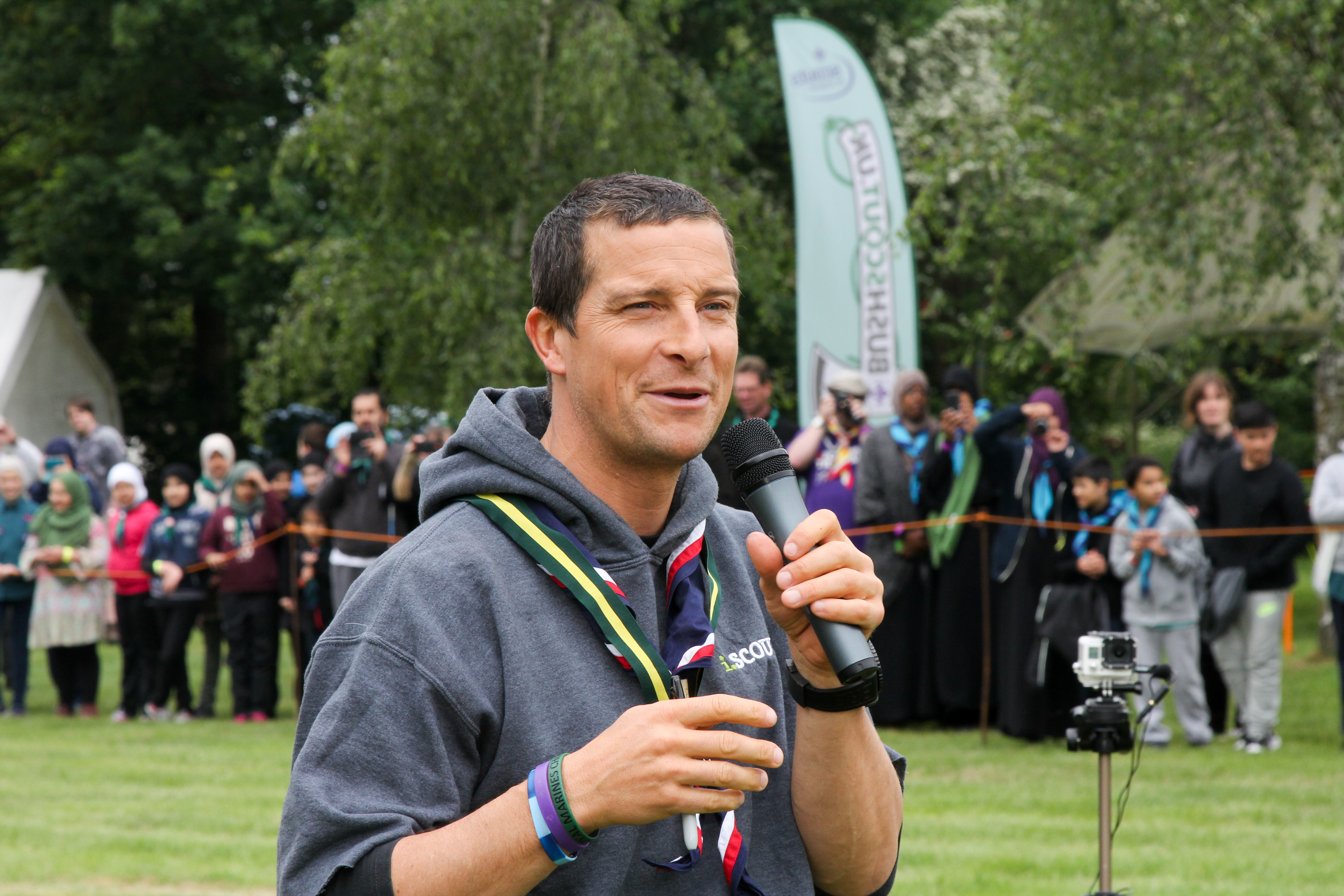
Grylls speaking in 2016

==== Designation of Chief Ambassador of World Scouting ====
On 16 November 2018, The World Organization of the Scout Movement announced the appointment of Bear Grylls as its first Chief Ambassador. Upon his appointment, he said "I'm very proud and humbled to take on this new role as Chief Ambassador of World Scouting and continue to promote the great work Scouting is doing across the globe. Scouting is a worldwide force for good that unites young people with positive values and an adventurous spirit. We aim to make a difference in our communities, help young people learn new skills, and be kind to all people."

Bear has long been a supporter of Scouting around the world, often visiting Scout groups on his filming missions, and appeared at the 24th World Scout Jamboree in his role as Chief Ambassador

==== Term as Chief Scout of the Scout Association ====
On 17 May 2009, The Scout Association announced Grylls would be appointed Chief Scout following the end of Peter Duncan's five-year term in July 2009. He was officially made Chief Scout at Gilwell 24 on 11 July 2009 at age 35 in a handover event featuring Peter Duncan in front of a crowd of over 3,000 Explorer Scouts. He is the tenth person to hold the position and the youngest Chief Scout since the role was created for Robert Baden-Powell in 1920.

On 9 April 2015, The Scout Association announced that Grylls would continue as Chief Scout until 2018. Grylls wrote, "I am so proud that the largest youth movement on the planet has asked me to continue in my role as UK Chief Scout."

On 5 June 2015, in an interview with The Telegraph, Grylls praised the challenge of being Britain's youngest Chief Scout, saying: "Scouting humbles me every day." He was succeeded as Chief Scout in 2024 by Dwayne Fields.

=== Ambassador in United24 ===
On 29 March 2023, Grylls became an ambassador for the UNITED24 platform. His learning and development company BecomingX, together with Amazon and Accenture, is developing the BecomingX Ukraine learning platform for Ukrainians.

== Personal life ==
Grylls married Shara Cannings Knight in 2000. They have three sons, born in 2003, 2006 and 2009.

In August 2015, Grylls left his 11-year-old son on Saint Tudwal's Island off the North Wales coast, as the tide approached, leaving him to be rescued by the Royal National Lifeboat Institution (RNLI) as part of their weekly practice missions. The child was unharmed, though the RNLI later criticised Grylls for the stunt, saying its crew "had not appreciated" that a child would be involved.

Grylls used to be a vegan but now consumes predominantly animal-based foods as well as fruits and honey. In 2024, he commented to The Irish Times that he was proud to be an Irish citizen. Grylls also owns the aforementioned small island off the coast of Wales according to Louis Theroux interviews on 2022.

Grylls is an Anglican Christian and converted through the Alpha course. He was officially baptised in the Jordan River in 2023. Grylls was also involved in the baptism of Russell Brand in the same year. In response to the release of rape and sexual misconduct allegations by Channel 4's Dispatches series against Brand, Grylls was asked on whether he had changed his opinion on the baptism, to which he said: "But I don’t know, I think at heart, my faith says we’re connected together, and we need each other, and not to judge people and to love people."

== See also ==
The Scout Association
Preceded by Peter Duncan	Chief Scout of the United Kingdom and Overseas Territories; 2009–2024	Succeeded by Dwayne Fields
