= Man vs. Wild =

American reality television series

- Also known as: Born Survivor: Bear Grylls; Ultimate Survival
- Starring: Bear Grylls
- Narrated by: Bear Grylls
- Countries of origin: United States; United Kingdom
- No. of seasons: 7
- No. of episodes: 73 (+4 specials) (list of episodes)

Production
- Running time: 45 minutes
- Production company: Diverse Productions

Original release
- Network: Channel 4 Discovery Channel
- Release: March 10, 2006 – November 29, 2011

Related
- You vs. Wild

Man vs. Wild, also called Born Survivor: Bear Grylls, Ultimate Survival, Survival Game, or colloquially as simply Bear Grylls in the United Kingdom, is a survival television series hosted by Bear Grylls on the Discovery Channel. In the United Kingdom, the series was originally shown on Channel 4, but the show's later seasons were broadcast on Discovery Channel U.K. The series was produced by British television production company Diverse Bristol. The show was premiered on November 10, 2006, after airing a pilot episode titled "The Rockies" on March 10, 2006.

Grylls also said he has been approached about doing a Man vs. Wild urban disaster 3D feature film, which he said he would "really like to do". He signed on to showcase urban survival techniques in a Discovery show called Worst-Case Scenario, which premiered on May 5, 2010, on the network.

The Discovery Channel terminated its legal relationship with Grylls in 2012 due to contract disputes, effectively canceling the series. In April 2019, Netflix brought Grylls back to the wilderness in the interactive series You vs. Wild, which includes eight episodes running approximately 20 minutes each.

== Background ==
The general format of each episode is the premise that Grylls is left stranded in a region with his film crew. The episode documents his efforts to survive and find a way back to civilization, usually requiring an overnight shelter of some kind. There are mostly wild terrains – jungles, forests, or similar non-urban areas. But in special episodes, like that in Shipyard Gdynia, there are industry areas located in cities. Grylls also tells about successful and failed survivals in the particular area which he is in.

Each episode takes about 7–10 days to shoot. Before each show the crew does about a week of reconnaissance, followed by Grylls doing a flyover of the terrain. Grylls then undergoes two days of intensive survival briefings, followed by a cameraman and a sound engineer. The directors oversee location filming and the final edit of each program. Grylls is specifically credited as "Presenter" to highlight his role in presenting survival techniques to the viewer.

According to Grylls, the show's format is "how to deal with difficulties presented to you":

I suppose [sic] to bear in mind that this is a worst-case scenario show, and therefore, of course things have to be planned. Otherwise, it would just be me in the wild and nothing happening, you know, 'cause textbook survival says you land, you get yourself comfortable, you wait for rescue, you don't do anything. It would be a very boring show. The show is how to deal if you fall into quick sand, if you get attacked by an alligator, if you have to make a raft. I get a really good briefing before we go. I know there's a big river there, there's gonna be a great cliff climb there, there's loads of snakes in those rocks, watch out for an alligator. So I do have a good idea of 80 percent of what's gonna happen.

Contrary to onscreen presentation, his movements are rarely from Point A to Point B: "We plan it, if we're doing different locations, sometimes we'll have to do a whole crew move and get a helicopter. Again, we're talking huge distances sometimes. So we'll use helis when we have to."

In April 2008, Grylls and Discovery released a book that includes survival tips from the TV show.

In a special first aired on June 2, 2009, Will Ferrell joined Grylls on a survival trip to Northern Sweden. This season 4 premiere episode was called Men vs. Wild.

In July 2011, Grylls had a special co-host, actor Jake Gyllenhaal in the season 7 premiere of the show on the Discovery Channel, in which they travelled through Iceland. In the U.K., this episode was aired as a special in 2014, under the Bear's Wild Weekend banner.

In March 2012, Discovery Channel terminated its contract with Grylls due to contract disputes. "Due to a continuing contractual dispute with Bear Grylls, Discovery has terminated all current productions with him," a network spokesperson told The Hollywood Reporter.

== Episodes ==
Season	Episodes	Originally released	
Season	Episodes	First released	Last released
1	15	March 10, 2006	July 20, 2007
2	13	November 9, 2007	June 6, 2008
3	12	August 6, 2008	February 23, 2009
4	14	August 12, 2009	February 17, 2010
5	7	August 11, 2010	September 22, 2010
6	6	February 17, 2011	March 24, 2011
7	6	July 11, 2011	November 29, 2011

=== Special India episodes ===
In August 2019, Bear Grylls appeared with Indian Prime Minister, Narendra Modi in a special episode filmed in the India's Jim Corbett National Park, Uttarakhand. The episode was showcased in more than 180 countries across the world on the Discovery, Inc. network. His second episode, retitled Into the Wild with actor Rajinikanth, was filmed in January 2020, with an air date on March 23, 2020. His third episode with actor Akshay Kumar, was showcased on 14 September 2020. In 2021, Ajay Devgan and Vicky Kaushal and in 2022 Ranveer Singh participated with Bear in separate episodes.

== Regional variations ==
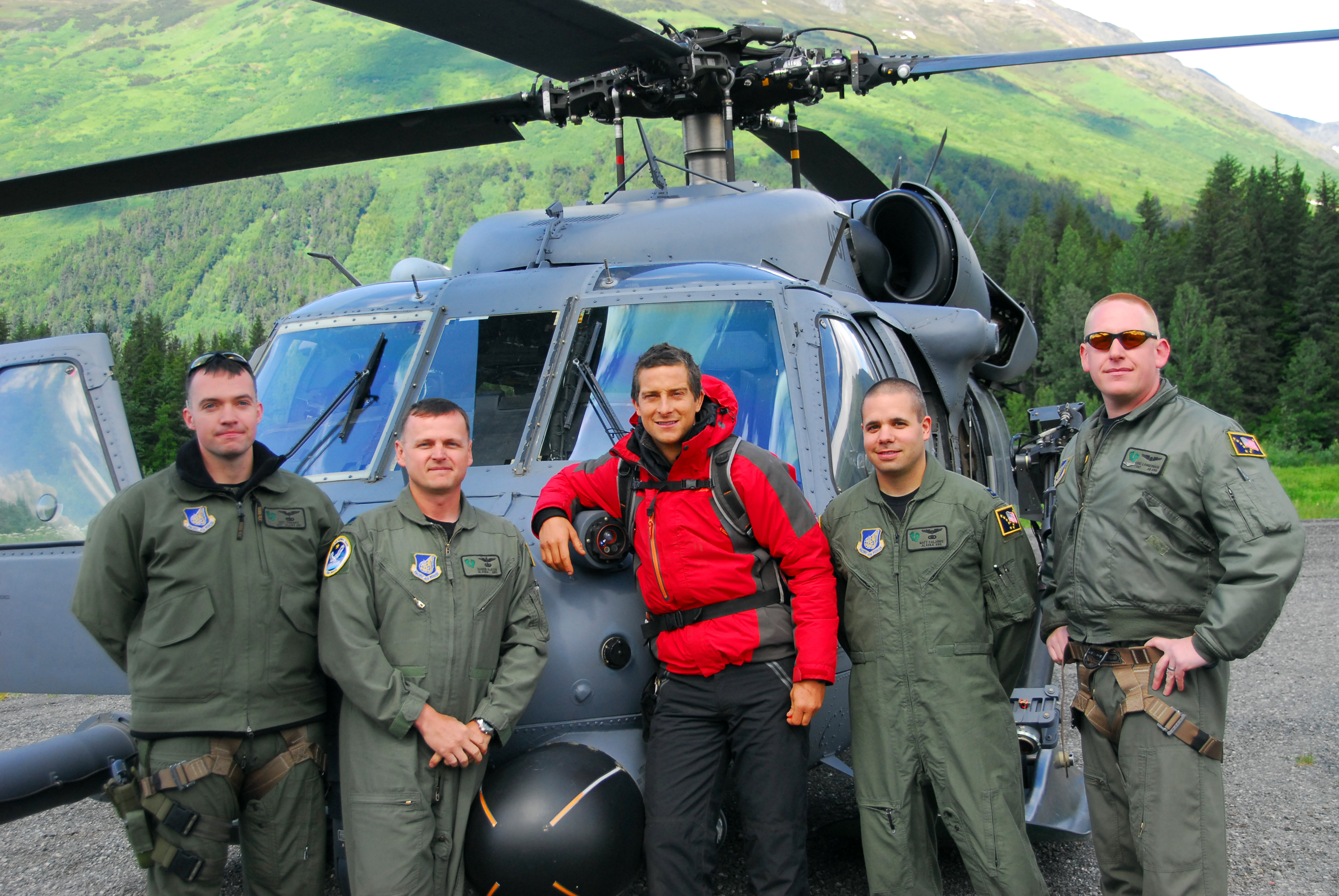
Grylls in front of an Alaska Air National Guard helicopter before heading out to Spencer Glacier to film Man vs. Wild

The show is called Man vs. Wild in the U.S., Canada, New Zealand, Australia, India, and Malaysia. The show does, however, go by different names in other parts of the world.

In the United Kingdom, where the show originates, it is called Born Survivor: Bear Grylls and is broadcast on the Discovery Channel. It is also known as Ultimate Survival in other countries. Grylls' books have also been published under the Born Survivor name in the U.K. These variations run basically the same format as Man vs. Wild, although there are some differences between them. For example, during the opening sequence, Grylls introduces the show with "Hello and welcome to Born Survivor, I'm Bear Grylls, and I'm in England—where I'm going to show you what it takes to get out alive." There are also a few differences in what he does during the shows; however, the names of the episodes are generally the same.

The release date of new episodes also varies slightly, since they cannot normally be arranged to show at exactly the same time due to schedule and time zone's differences.

== Criticism and response ==
=== Criticism ===
In 2006, a Man vs. Wild crew member admitted that some scenes in episodes were misleading, indicating to viewers that Grylls was stranded in the wild alone when he was not. The issue of scenes being manipulated was also raised by Mark Weinert, a U.S. survival consultant. One example he gave was of a raft allegedly being put together by team members before being taken apart, so Grylls could be filmed building it. Other scenes that have been criticized include:

- A scene in the episode "Mount Kilauea" where Grylls was purported to have escaped from an active volcano by leaping across the lava, avoiding poisonous sulfur dioxide gas, was actually enhanced with special effects, using hot coal and smoke machines.
- The "Deserted Island" episode gave viewers the impression that Grylls "was a 'real life Robinson Crusoe' stuck on a desert island", while in reality he was on an outlying part of the Hawaiian archipelago and retired to a motel at night.

=== Show's response to criticism with changes ===
In response to these early criticisms, Discovery and Channel 4 aired re-edited versions of some episodes, removing elements that were too planned, with a fresh voice-over and a preceding announcement pointing out that some situations are "presented to Bear to show the viewer how to survive". However, five of the most controversial episodes in Season 1 were never re-released after editing and are no longer available on DVD from Discovery. These are The Rockies, Moab Desert, Costa Rican Rain Forest, Mount Kilauea and Desert Island.

Following criticism in the media in July 2007 about elements of the show's first season, Channel 4 temporarily suspended the show's second season for a few weeks, promising clarification and transparency in the production and editing of the show. The channel issued a statement saying that:

The programme explicitly does not claim that presenter Bear Grylls' experience is one of unaided solo survival. For example, he often directly addresses the production team, including the cameraman, making it clear he is receiving an element of back-up.

The Discovery Channel also responded to the criticism by announcing that future airings would be edited so as not to imply to viewers that Grylls was left alone to survive during the production of the show. Due to this change, episodes in later airings, on DVDs and digital distribution contain a notice at the beginning of each episode stating that Grylls will receive help from the camera crew on occasion, that he will in certain circumstances use provided safety equipment to minimize risks, and that he will sometimes deliberately put himself in dangerous situations to demonstrate survival techniques. Grylls has also stated on camera when he has received assistance to demonstrate survival tactics or when he is exiting the setting for a while due to safety concerns.

On August 3, 2007, Grylls posted on his blog that the "press accusations of motels and stagings in the show that have been doing the rounds, all I can say is they don't always tell the full story, but that's life and part of being in the public eye I guess." In response to allegations of spending nights in local hotels as opposed to staying in the shelters built during filming, Grylls clarifies in an article in the December 3 issue of People magazine: "The night stuff [shown on camera] is all done for real. But when I'm not filming I stay with the crew in some sort of base camp."

Additionally, the Discovery Channel started releasing "making-of" episodes from Season 4. In the behind-the-scenes footage, Grylls tells how the film crew sometimes assists him in filming certain sequences. In addition, while setting up a scene, each production crew member is introduced and their role is briefly explained, including a safety consultant who served in the Royal Marines. Grylls also tells how each crew members' role ensures his safety while he explains survival tactics. The footage includes open discussion over safety and other precautions. The Discovery Channel in the U.K. has also edited out certain scenes of Grylls killing animals that he has captured for food.

== See also ==
- Extreme Survival, a British survival-themed series hosted by Ray Mears.
- Survivorman, a Canadian survival-themed series hosted by Les Stroud.
- Dual Survival, an American survival-themed series in which two people go into the wild and survive together
