= Ernest Marples =

Former Conservative Minister of Transport

The Right Honourable The Lord Marples PC

Minister of Transport
- In office 14 October 1959 – 16 October 1964
- Prime Minister: Harold Macmillan; Alec Douglas-Home
- Preceded by: Harold Watkinson
- Succeeded by: Tom Fraser

Postmaster General
- In office 17 January 1957 – 14 October 1959
- Prime Minister: Harold Macmillan
- Preceded by: Charles Hill
- Succeeded by: Reginald Bevins

Member of Parliament for Wallasey
- In office 26 July 1945 – 8 February 1974
- Preceded by: George Reakes
- Succeeded by: Lynda Chalker

Personal details
- Born: Alfred Ernest Marples; 9 December 1907 Levenshulme, Lancashire, England
- Died: 6 July 1978 (aged 70) The Princess Grace Hospital Centre, Monaco
- Resting place: Southern Cemetery, Manchester
- Party: Conservative
- Spouse(s): Edna Florence Harwood (1937–1945) (dissolved); Ruth Alianore Dobson (1956–1978) (his death)

Alfred Ernest Marples, Baron Marples, PC (9 December 1907 – 6 July 1978) was a British Conservative politician who served as Postmaster General (1957–1959) and Minister of Transport (1959–1964).

As Postmaster General, he oversaw the introduction of the Premium Bond scheme and of postcodes. His period as Minister of Transport was controversial. He both oversaw significant road construction (he opened the first section of the M1 motorway) and the closure of a considerable portion of the national railway network with the Beeching cuts. His involvement in the road construction business Marples Ridgway, of which he had been managing director, led to concerns regarding conflict of interest. In later life, Marples was elevated to the peerage before fleeing to Monaco at very short notice to avoid prosecution for tax fraud.

== Early life ==
Marples was born at 45 Dorset Road, Levenshulme, Manchester, Lancashire. His father had been a renowned engineering charge-hand and Manchester Labour campaigner, and his mother had worked in a local hat factory. Marples attended Victoria Park Council School and won a scholarship to Stretford Grammar School. By the age of 14 he was already active in the labour movement, as well as earning money by selling cigarettes and sweets to Manchester football crowds. He also played football for a YMCA team.

Marples worked as a miner, a postman, a chef and an accountant. In the Second World War he was commissioned into the Royal Artillery in 1941, rose to the rank of captain and was medically discharged in 1944.

In 1937 Marples married Edna Florence Harwood, the daughter of a Nottingham businessman. This marriage was dissolved in 1945.

In 1956 Marples married his former secretary Ruth Dobson (1919–2014), who on his elevation to the peerage in 1974 became Lady Marples.

== Political career ==
Marples joined the Conservative Party and in 1945 was elected as Member of Parliament for Wallasey. In 1951, Winston Churchill appointed him a junior minister in the Conservative Government 1951–1955. Marples was a minister under Harold Macmillan and Alec Douglas-Home throughout the Conservative Government 1957–1964.

=== Postmaster General ===
In 1957, Harold Macmillan appointed Marples Postmaster General. On 2 June 1957, Marples started the first draw for the new Premium Bond scheme (the computer generating the random numbers was coincidentally named ERNIE). At that time the telephone network was controlled by the General Post Office, and saw the introduction of subscriber trunk dialling (STD), which eliminated the use of operators on national phone calls, and it has also been claimed that he introduced the first postcodes to the UK, although these were both actually technical innovations which would probably have been inevitable regardless of the presiding politician.

=== Minister of Transport ===
Marples was Minister of Transport from 14 October 1959 until the Conservatives lost the 1964 general election on 16 October 1964.

As Minister of Transport, Marples oversaw the introduction of the Pink Zone (a parking scheme for the Christmas period in central London), panda crossings in 1962 and two Transport Acts. The Road Traffic Act of 1960 introduced the MOT test, roadside single yellow lines and double yellow lines, traffic wardens, and the 250 cc engine limit for learner motorcyclists.

The Transport Act 1962 dissolved the British Transport Commission (BTC) which had overseen the railways, canals and road freight transport and established the British Railways Board; it also put in place measures which simplified the process of closing railways. The Act was described as the "most momentous piece of legislation in the field of railway law to have been enacted since the Railway and Canal Traffic Act 1854".

In anticipation of the 1962 Act, the government appointed Dr Richard Beeching as Chairman of the British Railways Board with a brief to recommend and implement such changes as were necessary to end the losses that were growing rapidly at the time. The Beeching cuts, or "Beeching Axe" that followed resulted in the major closures for both stations and lines.

=== Peerage ===
Marples retired from the House of Commons at the February 1974 general election. On 8 May 1974 he was made a life peer as Baron Marples of Wallasey in the County of Merseyside.

== Business interests ==
In the late 1940s Marples was a director of a company called Kirk & Kirk, which was a contractor in the construction of Brunswick Wharf Power Station at Blackwall in London. Marples met civil engineer Reginald Ridgway (1908–2002), who was working as a contractor for Kirk & Kirk. In 1948 the two men founded Marples Ridgway and Partners, a civil engineering company that started with one five-ton ex-army truck and one crane.

The new partnership took over Kirk & Kirk's contract at Brunswick Wharf and in 1950 Marples severed his links with Kirk & Kirk. Marples Ridgway's subsequent contracts included building power stations in England, the Allt na Lairige dam in Scotland, roads in Ethiopia and England, and a port in Jamaica. The Bath and Portland Group took over Marples Ridgway in 1964.

== Controversies ==
=== Conflict of interest ===
Shortly after he became a junior minister in November 1951, Marples resigned as managing director of Marples Ridgway but continued to hold some 80% of the firm's shares. When he was made Minister of Transport in October 1959, Marples undertook to sell his shareholding in the company as he was now in clear breach of the House of Commons' rules on conflicts of interest. He had not done so by January 1960, at which time the Evening Standard reported that Marples Ridgway had won the tender to build the Hammersmith Flyover and that the Ministry of Transport's engineers had endorsed the London County Council's rejection of a lower tender.

Marples' first attempt to sell his shares was blocked by Reginald Manningham-Buller, the Attorney-General, on the grounds that he was using his former business partner, Reginald Ridgway, as an agent to ensure that he could buy back the shares upon leaving office. Marples subsequently transferred nominal ownership of the shares to his wife in a scheme which included the same buy back clause; by this time, his shares had come to be worth between £350,000 and £400,000. It is unknown what price Ruth Marples paid for the shares, or even if there was any consideration at all.

In 1959, shortly after becoming minister, Marples opened the first section of the M1 motorway. Although the company didn't officially build the M1, the Guardian's architecture and design correspondent Jonathan Glancey alleged "it certainly had a finger in the pie." Marples Ridgway built the Hammersmith flyover in London at a cost of £1.3 million, immediately followed by building the Chiswick flyover.

Marples Ridgway was also involved in other major road projects in the 1950s and 1960s including the £4.1 million extension of the M1 into London, referred to as the Hendon Urban Motorway at the time.

=== Use of prostitutes ===
When Lord Denning made his 1963 investigation into the security aspects of the Profumo affair and the rumoured affair between the Minister of Defence, Duncan Sandys and the Duchess of Argyll, he confirmed to Macmillan that a rumour that Ernest Marples was in the habit of using prostitutes appeared to be true. In early 2020, the rumours were corroborated by broadcaster and investigative journalist Tom Mangold, based on the diaries of Lord Denning's then-secretary, Thomas Critchley. The diaries reported the transport minister's fetish for being whipped while dressed in women's clothing, as described in great detail by one of the prostitutes who had provided these services to Marples, and confirmed at the time by her detailed knowledge of the interior of Marples' home where the events took place. The story was suppressed and did not appear in Denning's final report.

=== Flight to Monaco ===
Early in 1975, Marples fled to Monaco. He left just before the end of the tax year, fearing that he would otherwise be liable for a substantial tax bill.

Among the journalists who investigated his unexpected flight was Richard Stott (later editor of the Daily Mirror):

In the early 70s ... he tried to fight off a revaluation of his assets which would undoubtedly cost him dear ... So Marples decided he had to go and hatched a plot to remove £2 million from Britain through his Liechtenstein company ... there was nothing for it but to cut and run, which Marples did just before the tax year of 1975. He left by the Night Ferry with his belongings crammed into tea chests, leaving the floors of his home in Belgravia littered with discarded clothes and possessions ... He claimed he had been asked to pay nearly 30 years' overdue tax ... The Treasury froze his assets in Britain for the next ten years. By then, most of them were safely in Monaco and Liechtenstein.

The flight came at a time when Marples was facing problems on several fronts. Tenants of his block of flats in Harwood Court, Upper Richmond Road, Putney, London, were demanding that he repair serious structural faults and had threatened legal action. He was being sued for £145,000 by the Bankers Trust merchant bank in relation to an agreement made with the French company Ernest Marples et Cie. He was also being sued by John Holmes, the chartered surveyor and director of Marples' property company Ecclestone Enterprises, for wrongful dismissal and who was claiming £70,000 in damages. The Inland Revenue was demanding that he pay nearly 30 years' back taxes on his residence in Eccleston Street, Belgravia, London, as well as capital gains tax on his properties in Kensington. In addition, in 1974, he had lost 130 cases of wine to a fire in a store he owned under a railway line in Brixton, and he had been convicted of drinking and driving for which he received a one-year ban and a £45 fine.

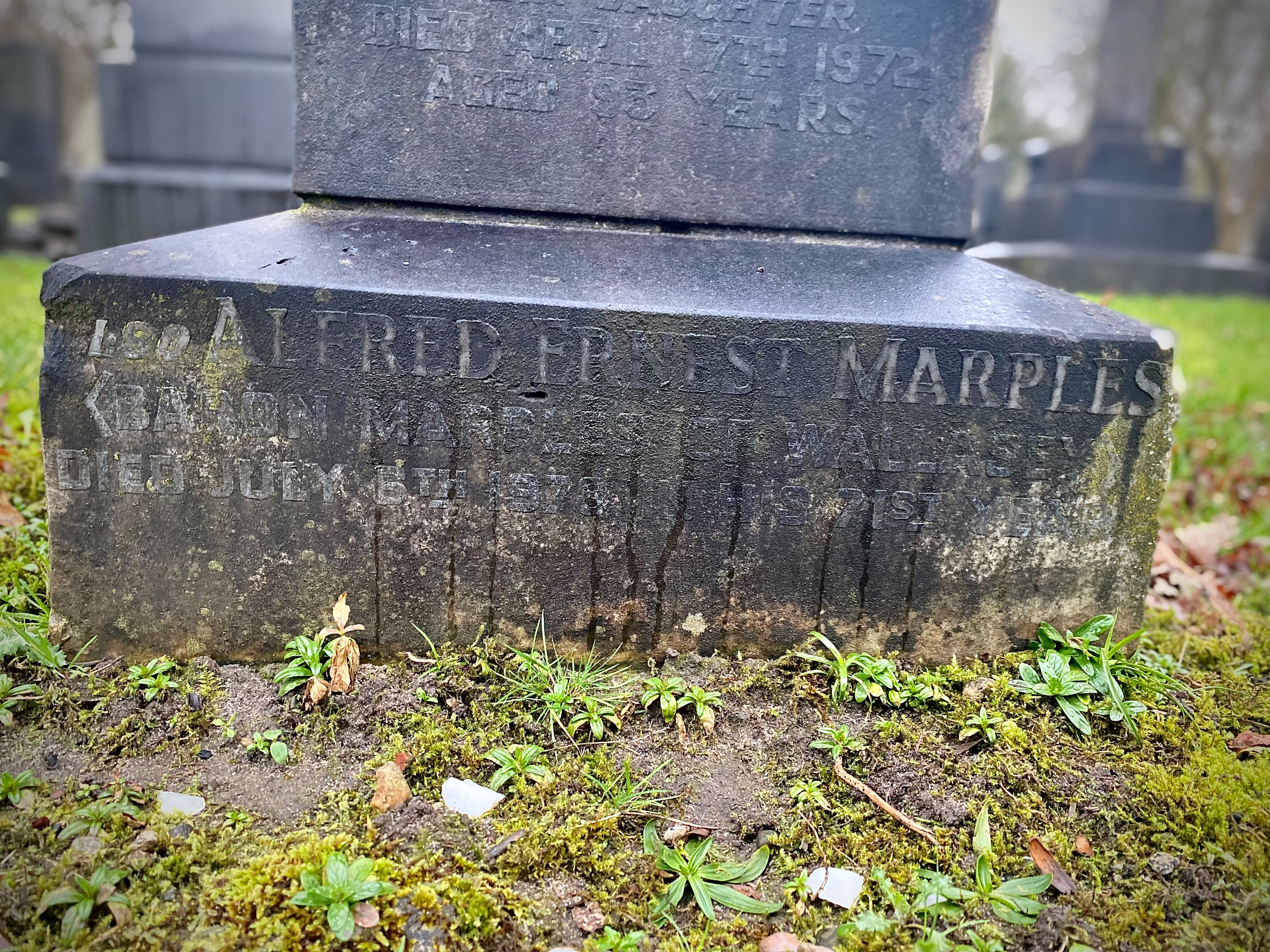
Memorial inscription to Ernest Marples on the family grave in Southern Cemetery, Manchester

His departure came in the wake of the failure of a plan to avoid paying tax on his properties by involving a Liechtenstein-based company with which he had been involved for more than ten years. He was to sell his Harwood Court block of flats for £500,000 to Vin International which would refurbish and sell them for between £2.25 million and £2.5 million. Marples would only be liable for capital gains tax at 30% on the transfer to Vin which, as an offshore company, would only be liable for stamp duty at 2%. The plan failed following the change of government in 1974. After reports of this plan were published in the Daily Mirror, the Treasury froze Marples' assets in Britain. In November 1977, he paid £7,600 to the British government in settlement of his breach of exchange control regulations, following which he made a return to London where, with agreement from HMRC, he was allowed to stay with friends for six weeks.

By now Marples had sold Chateau Chaintre and his final years were spent on his 18-hectare (44-acre) vineyard estate in Les Laverts, Fleurie, France. He died in Princess Grace Hospital Centre, Monaco, on 6 July 1978. In his will, he left property valued at £388,166. He is buried in a family plot in Southern Cemetery, Manchester.

== Popular culture ==
In 2009, his name was used for a website, ernestmarples.com, that campaigned to have the UK Postcode dataset released as Open Data and drew threats of legal action by the Royal Mail against its founders. The dataset was opened up on 1 April 2010 following support from many people, including MPs, and Code-Point Open can now be downloaded free with data.gov.uk.

The founders of the site claim not to have been aware of the controversies concerning Ernest Marples when they chose his name for the website.

Parliament of the United Kingdom
Preceded by George Reakes	Member of Parliament for Wallasey; 1945–February 1974	Succeeded by Lynda Chalker
Political offices
Preceded by Charles Hill	Postmaster General; 1957–1959	Succeeded by Reginald Bevins
Preceded by Harold Watkinson	Minister of Transport; 1959–1964	Succeeded by Tom Fraser
