= William George Nicholson Geddes =

Scottish civil engineer

William George Nicholson Geddes CBE FRSE FREng
- Born: 29 July 1913; Oldhamstocks, East Lothian
- Died: 10 November 1993 (aged 80)
- Citizenship: Scottish
- Education: University of Edinburgh
- Engineering career
- Discipline: Civil engineer and Structural engineer
- Institutions: Institution of Structural Engineers, Institution of Engineers and Shipbuilders in Scotland, Institution of Civil Engineers
- Practice name: Babtie Shaw and Morton
- Projects: Allt-na-Lairige Dam, Backwater Dam
- Awards: CBE

William George Nicholson Geddes (29 July 1913 – 10 November 1993) was a Scottish civil engineer.

== Life ==
George Geddes was born in Oldhamstocks, East Lothian the son of Ina Nicholson and her husband, William Brydon Geddes. His early education was at Dunbar Grammar School.

He studied civil engineering at the University of Edinburgh, graduating with a BSc in 1934 and gaining a "blue" in football. He worked for the City Engineer in Edinburgh, then Sir William Arrol & Company, and F.A. Macdonald & Partners under William Fairhurst, before joining Babtie, Shaw and Morton in 1942. He became a partner of the firm in 1950 and senior partner from 1976 to 1978. His specialist experience was structural engineering which led to an interest in hydro-electric projects, dams, shipyards, docks and industrial developments.

One of Geddes' most notable projects, under the overall direction of James Arthur Banks and later constructed by the contractor Marples Ridgway, was his contribution to the design of the Allt na Lairige dam in Argyllshire in the 1950s. This was the first concrete dam in western Europe, and possibly the world, to be prestressed by using high tensile steel bars, bolted either end, to compress the structure.

Later Geddes was in charge of Backwater Dam, the first in the UK to use a chemical grout cut-off. One of his outstanding achievements was the major shipbuilding dock at the head of the Musgrave Channel in Belfast for Harland and Wolff. The dock was the largest in the World when it was completed in 1970, having been designed and built scarcely two years after the decision was taken to proceed.

In 1975, he was elected a Fellow of the Royal Society of Edinburgh. His proposers were Hugh Sutherland, William Thomas Marshall, Ian Sneddon, Anthony Cusens, Robert Simpson Silver and Arnold Hendry.

As well as being active in Scottish branches of professional institutions, he was elected President of all three of the Institutions in which he took a keen interest: the Institution of Structural Engineers in 1971–72, the Institution of Engineers and Shipbuilders in Scotland 1977–79, and the Institution of Civil Engineers between November 1979 and November 1980. In 1975, he was made a Fellow of the Royal Society of Edinburgh, and a Commander of the Order of the British Empire in 1978. In 1980, he received an Honorary Doctorate of Science from the University of Edinburgh.

== Family ==
Geddes was married to Margaret Gilchrist Wilson in 1941.

== Football ==
Geddes was an accomplished footballer, playing for Queen's Park F.C. in 1936, and serving from 1985 to 1988 as their President and eventually becoming a patron of the club, the oldest club in Scotland.

Professional and academic associations
Preceded by Reginald Coates	President of the Institution of Civil Engineers; November 1979 – November 1980	Succeeded by Peter Arthur Cox
