= Law Society of the Cape of Good Hope v Windvogel =

South African legal case

Law Society of the Cape of Good Hope v Windvogel is an important case in South African law, in particular in the area of civil procedure.

== Facts ==
The Law Society applied for a notice of motion to strike Windvogel's name from the roll of attorneys, because he had misappropriated funds entrusted to him as a curator bonis and had also failed to keep proper books of his trust account transactions.

Windvogel had taken too long to enter his notice of intention to defend, and applied for postponement of the applications to have his name struck off the roll of lawyers, as well as the interdict for him to stop working.

== Argument ==
At trial, Windvogel admitted to having been negligent and careless with his trust account transactions. He put forward all manner of excuses to explain why clients' money had found its way into his personal account.

== Judgment ==
The court found that the question of fitness is a discretionary one. It found, therefore, that Windvogel was not a fit and proper person to be allowed to continue practising as an attorney.

As to the issue of costs, the applicant sought an order for costs against the respondent on the scale as between an attorney and his own client. A court will not normally direct the precise method of taxation of costs, but will generally order costs to be taxed on a party-and-party or on an attorney-and-client scale.

The court considered that an attorney-client cost order may be issued after considering the circumstances surrounding the case, the conduct of the losing party and whether the court finds it just to make such an order. The court considered cases from its division in the past in which it had awarded similar costs and held that "the reason for such a cost order is that the Law Society is a statutory body which obtains its funding from its members and if a member strays to the extent that it becomes necessary for the Law Society to apply for his removal or for his suspension, there is no reason why any of the members of the association to which the respondent belonged should be out of pocket as a result of his conduct."

Accordingly, the court ordered costs on an attorney-client basis.

As to the issue of taxation, the court noted that, before the amount of an attorney-and-client bill can be recovered, it must first be taxed against that latter party. When the other party to the litigation is required to pay costs, the taxation will not be as generous as where an attorney's own client is to pay that attorney's costs.
