= Conservative government, 1957–1964 =

Government of the United Kingdom

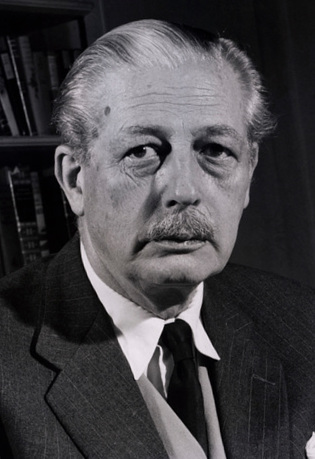
Harold Macmillan led the Government from 1957 to 1963, and was succeeded by Lord (Alec) Home.

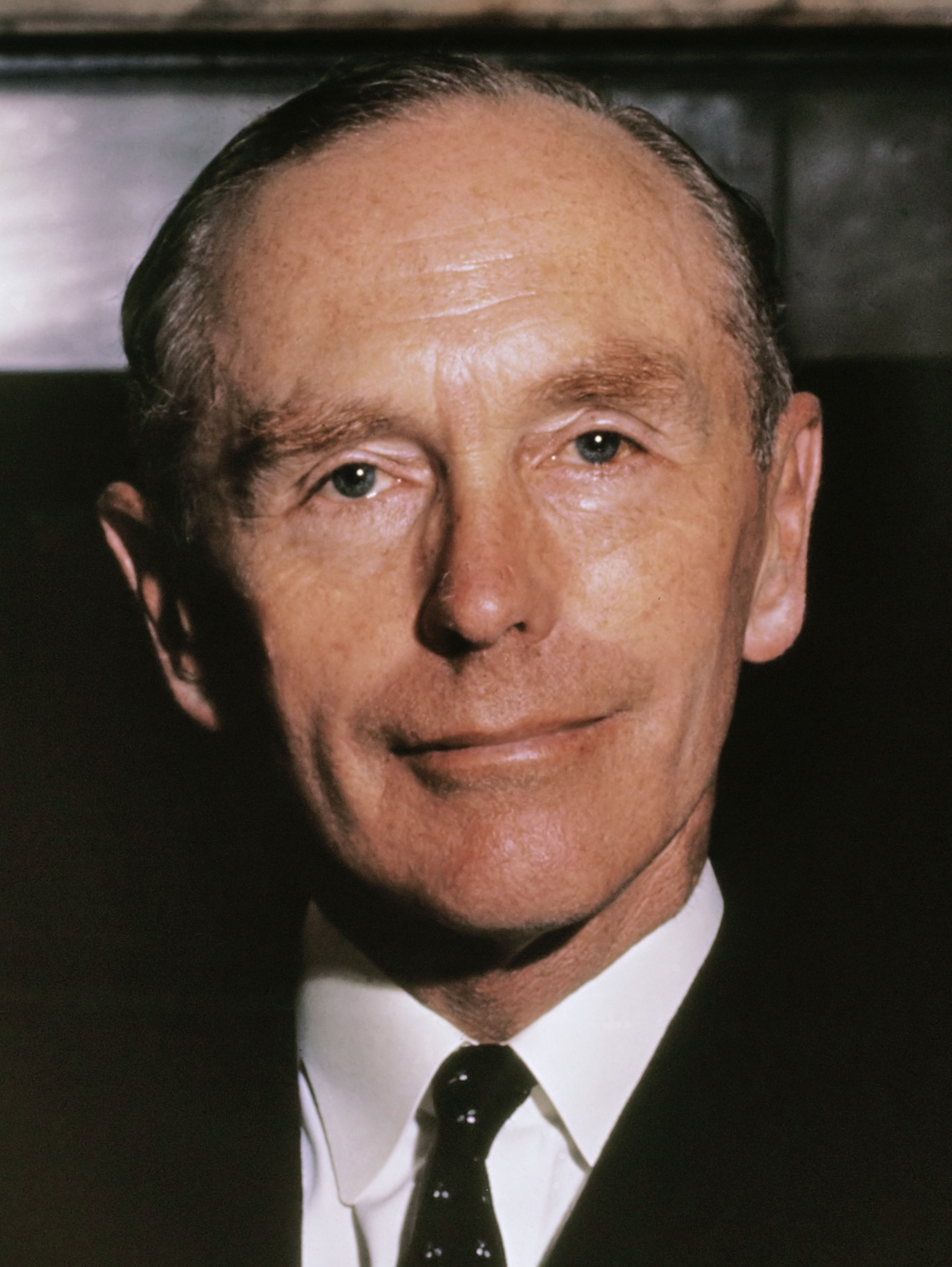
Alec Douglas-Home led the Government from 1963 onwards. He was defeated at the 1964 general election.

The Conservative government of the United Kingdom that began in 1957 and ended in 1964 consisted of three ministries: the first Macmillan ministry, second Macmillan ministry, and then the Douglas-Home ministry. They were respectively led by Harold Macmillan and Alec Douglas-Home, who were appointed by Queen Elizabeth II.

== History ==
=== Formation of the first Macmillan ministry ===
==== Succession after Eden ====
Anthony Eden resigned from his positions of Leader of the Conservative Party and Prime Minister of the United Kingdom on 9 January 1957. This was mainly a consequence of the Suez Crisis fiasco of the previous autumn, but was also owing to his increasingly failing health. Harold Macmillan, formerly Foreign Secretary and Chancellor of the Exchequer, was chosen over Rab Butler as the new party leader and consequently as prime minister. Contemporary reports suggested that Macmillan was preferred over Butler because he was considered more capable of maintaining party unity following divisions caused by the Suez Crisis. American officials and newspapers generally welcomed Macmillan’s appointment, believing it could help repair Anglo-American relations damaged during the Suez Crisis.

The Queen consulted both Winston Churchill and the Marquess of Salisbury before inviting Macmillan to form a government, owing to uncertainty over which candidate could command the strongest support within the Conservative Party. Labour politicians subsequently argued that the succession process had improperly drawn the Crown into party politics, and called for parties to adopt formal leadership election procedures.

==== Cabinet formation ====
Harold Macmillan tried to placate Butler, who had stood against Macmillan as leader, by appointing him to the senior position of Home Secretary. Peter Thorneycroft became Chancellor of the Exchequer, but he caused embarrassment for Macmillan when he resigned only a year later. He was replaced by Derick Heathcoat-Amory, previously Minister of Agriculture, Fisheries and Food. Selwyn Lloyd was retained as Foreign Secretary, a post he held until 1960, when he succeeded Heathcoat-Amory as Chancellor. Ernest Marples became Minister for Transport and Alec Douglas-Home was promoted to Leader of the House of Lords and also continued as Secretary of State for Commonwealth Affairs, before replacing Lloyd as Foreign Secretary in 1960. Lord Kilmuir and Alan Lennox-Boyd retained their offices of Lord Chancellor and Secretary of State for the Colonies respectively, while Lord Hailsham became a member of the cabinet for the first time as Minister of Education. Future Chancellor Iain Macleod was appointed Minister of Labour and National Service and succeeded Lennox-Boyd as Secretary of State for the Colonies in 1961.

=== 1959 General Election and second Macmillan ministry ===
The Conservatives comfortably won the 1959 general election, increasing their majority in the House of Commons, following a campaign slogan "Life's better with the Conservatives". This centred on the consistently low unemployment, strong economy and rising standard of living that much of the British population was enjoying in the late 1950s.

However, a series of economic measures in the early 1960s caused the popularity of the Conservative Party to decline. Macmillan tried to remedy this by a major cabinet reshuffle in July 1962. Seven cabinet members were sacked in what became nicknamed the "Night of the Long Knives". Notably, the emerging Reginald Maudling replaced Selwyn Lloyd as Chancellor, and Lord Kilmuir was replaced as Lord Chancellor by Lord Dilhorne, while Peter Thorneycroft returned to the cabinet as Minister of Defence. Rab Butler was also promoted to the office of First Secretary of State. The reshuffle was controversial within the Conservative Party, and was seen as a betrayal by many. Macmillan's credibility was also affected by the 1963 Profumo affair; he was now in his 69th year, and had until after his 70th birthday to call the next general election. The election of Harold Wilson as Labour Party leader early in the year, following the sudden death of Hugh Gaitskell, was well received by voters, with opinion polls showing the Labour Party ascendant.

However, it was still considered a surprise when Macmillan resigned in October 1963.

=== Douglas-Home becomes Prime Minister ===
Macmillan's resignation saw a three-way tussle for the party leadership and premiership. Given that it was not considered appropriate for a prime minister to be a member of the House of Lords, Alec Douglas-Home and Lord Hailsham both disclaimed their peerages under the Peerage Act 1963, and became known respectively as Sir Alec Douglas-Home and Quintin Hogg. Rab Butler was also in the running for the post, but Douglas-Home was finally chosen to succeed Macmillan. This was seen as controversial, for it was alleged that Macmillan had pulled strings and used the party's grandees, nicknamed "The Magic Circle", to ensure that Butler was once again overlooked.

In the Douglas-Home ministry, Rab Butler became Foreign Secretary, and Henry Brooke replaced Butler as Home Secretary. Reginald Maudling continued as Chancellor, while Quintin Hogg remained as Lord President of the Council and Minister for Sports. He could not continue as Leader of the House of Lords, having ceased to be a member of it, but was made Minister for Education in April 1964. Selwyn Lloyd also returned to the government after a one-year absence, as Leader of the House of Commons. Douglas-Home's government was defeated in the October 1964 general election. He remained party leader until July 1965.

The 1957–1964 Conservative government saw several emerging figures who would later attain high office. Future Prime Minister Edward Heath became a member of the cabinet for the first time as Minister of Labour and National Service in 1959, while another future Prime Minister, Margaret Thatcher, held her first government post in 1961 as Parliamentary Secretary to the Ministry of Pensions. The government also included future Chancellor Anthony Barber, future Home Secretary and Deputy Prime Minister William Whitelaw and future Secretary of State for Education and Science Keith Joseph. Other notable government members included Enoch Powell, Lord Carrington, David Ormsby-Gore, John Profumo, Christopher Soames, Bill Deedes, Airey Neave and the Marquess of Salisbury.

== Cabinets ==
=== First Macmillan ministry ===
Macmillan ministries
- Cabinet of the United Kingdom
- 1957–1959; 1959–1963
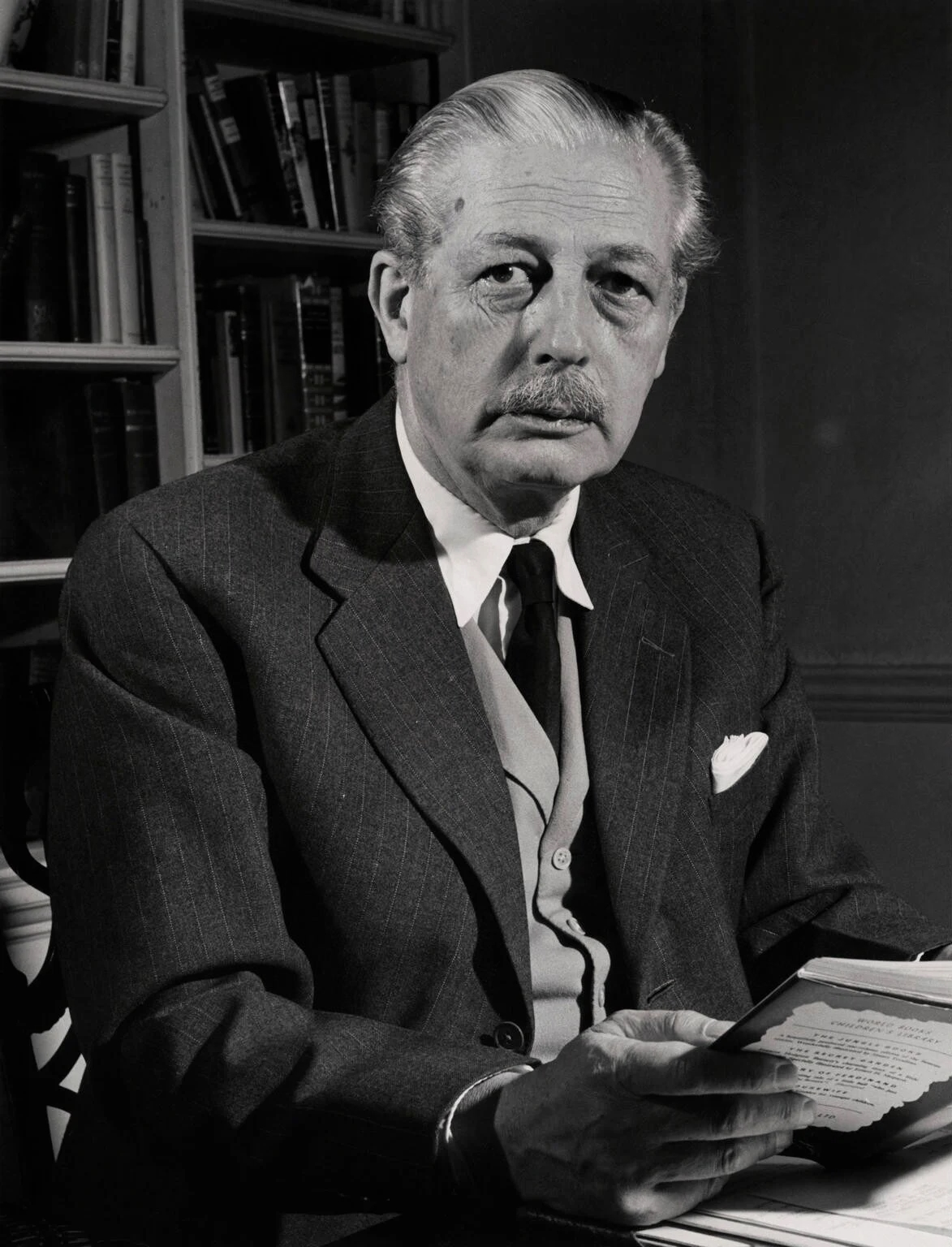
- Macmillan (1959)
- Date formed: First: 10 January 1957; Second: 8 October 1959
- Date dissolved: First: 8 October 1959; Second: 18 October 1963

People and organisations
- Monarch: Elizabeth II
- Prime Minister: Harold Macmillan
- Prime Minister's history: 1957–1963
- Deputy Prime Minister: Rab Butler (1962–1963)
- Ministers removed: "Night of the Long Knives"
- Member party: Conservative Party
- Status in legislature: Majority
- Opposition party: Labour Party
- Opposition leader: Hugh Gaitskell (1957–1963); Harold Wilson (1963)

History
- Election: 1959 general election
- Legislature terms: 41st UK Parliament; 42nd UK Parliament
- Predecessor: Eden ministry
- Successor: Douglas-Home ministry

==== January 1957 – October 1959 ====
- Harold Macmillan: Prime Minister
- David Maxwell Fyfe, 1st Viscount Kilmuir: Lord High Chancellor of Great Britain
- Robert Gascoyne-Cecil, 5th Marquess of Salisbury: Leader of the House of Lords and Lord President of the Council
- Rab Butler: Leader of the House of Commons and Lord Keeper of the Privy Seal and Home Secretary
- Peter Thorneycroft: Chancellor of the Exchequer
- Selwyn Lloyd: Secretary of State for Foreign Affairs
- Alan Lennox-Boyd: Secretary of State for the Colonies
- Alec Douglas-Home, 14th Earl of Home: Secretary of State for Commonwealth Relations
- Sir David Eccles: President of the Board of Trade
- Charles Hill: Chancellor of the Duchy of Lancaster
- Quintin Hogg, 2nd Viscount Hailsham: Minister of Education
- John Scott Maclay: Secretary of State for Scotland
- Derick Heathcoat Amory: Minister of Agriculture
- Iain Macleod: Minister of Labour and National Service
- Harold Arthur Watkinson: Minister of Transport and Civil Aviation
- Duncan Edwin Sandys: Minister of Defence
- Percy Mills, 1st Baron Mills: Minister of Power
- Henry Brooke: Minister of Housing and Local Government and Welsh Affairs

===== Changes =====
- March 1957 – The Earl of Home succeeds Marquess of Salisbury as Lord President, remaining also Commonwealth Relations Secretary.
- September 1957 – Viscount Hailsham succeeds Lord Home as Lord President, Home remaining Commonwealth Relations Secretary. Geoffrey Lloyd succeeds Hailsham as Minister of Education. The Paymaster-General, Reginald Maudling, enters the Cabinet.
- January 1958 – Derick Heathcoat Amory succeeds Peter Thorneycroft as Chancellor of the Exchequer. John Hare succeeds Amory as Minister of Agriculture.

=== Second Macmillan ministry ===
==== October 1959 – July 1960 ====
- Harold Macmillan: Prime Minister
- David Maxwell Fyfe, 1st Viscount Kilmuir: Lord High Chancellor of Great Britain
- Alec Douglas-Home, 14th Earl of Home: Lord President of the Council and Secretary of State for Commonwealth Relations
- Quintin Hogg, 2nd Viscount Hailsham: Lord Keeper of the Privy Seal and Minister for Science
- Derick Heathcoat Amory: Chancellor of the Exchequer
- Rab Butler: Home Secretary
- Selwyn Lloyd: Secretary of State for Foreign Affairs
- Iain Macleod: Secretary of State for the Colonies
- Reginald Maudling: President of the Board of Trade
- Charles Hill: Chancellor of the Duchy of Lancaster
- Sir David Eccles: Minister of Education
- Percy Mills, 1st Baron Mills: Paymaster General
- Ernest Marples: Minister of Transport
- Duncan Sandys: Minister of Aviation
- Harold Watkinson: Minister of Defence
- John Scott Maclay: Secretary of State for Scotland
- Edward Heath: Minister of Labour and National Service
- John Hare: Minister of Agriculture
- Henry Brooke: Minister of Housing and Local Government and Welsh Affairs

==== July 1960 – October 1961 ====
- Harold Macmillan: Prime Minister
- David Maxwell Fyfe, 1st Viscount Kilmuir: Lord High Chancellor of Great Britain
- Quintin Hogg, 2nd Viscount Hailsham: Lord President of the Council and Minister for Science
- Selwyn Lloyd: Chancellor of the Exchequer
- Alec Douglas-Home, 14th Earl of Home: Secretary of State for Foreign Affairs
- Edward Heath: Lord Keeper of the Privy Seal
- Rab Butler: Home Secretary
- Iain Macleod: Secretary of State for the Colonies
- Duncan Sandys: Secretary of State for Commonwealth Relations
- Reginald Maudling: President of the Board of Trade
- Charles Hill: Chancellor of the Duchy of Lancaster
- Sir David Eccles: Minister of Education
- Percy Mills, 1st Baron Mills: Paymaster General
- Ernest Marples: Minister of Transport
- Peter Thorneycroft: Minister of Aviation
- Harold Watkinson: Minister of Defence
- John Scott Maclay: Secretary of State for Scotland
- John Hare: Minister of Labour
- Christopher Soames: Minister of Agriculture
- Henry Brooke: Minister of Housing and Local Government and Welsh Affairs

==== October 1961 – July 1962 ====
- Harold Macmillan: Prime Minister
- David Maxwell Fyfe, 1st Viscount Kilmuir: Lord High Chancellor of Great Britain
- Quintin Hogg, 2nd Viscount Hailsham: Lord President of the Council and Minister for Science
- Selwyn Lloyd: Chancellor of the Exchequer
- Alec Douglas-Home, 14th Earl of Home: Secretary of State for Foreign Affairs
- Edward Heath: Lord Keeper of the Privy Seal
- Rab Butler: Home Secretary
- Reginald Maudling: Secretary of State for the Colonies
- Duncan Sandys: Secretary of State for Commonwealth Relations
- Frederick Erroll: President of the Board of Trade
- Iain Macleod: Chancellor of the Duchy of Lancaster
- Sir David Eccles: Minister of Education
- Henry Brooke: Chief Secretary to the Treasury and Paymaster General
- Ernest Marples: Minister of Transport
- Peter Thorneycroft: Minister of Aviation
- Harold Watkinson: Minister of Defence
- John Scott Maclay: Secretary of State for Scotland
- John Hare: Minister of Labour
- Christopher Soames: Minister of Agriculture
- Charles Hill: Minister of Housing and Local Government and Welsh Affairs
- Percy Mills, 1st Baron Mills: Minister without Portfolio

==== July 1962 – October 1963 ====
In a radical reshuffle dubbed "The Night of the Long Knives", Macmillan sacked a third of his Cabinet and instituted many other changes.

- Harold Macmillan: Prime Minister
- Rab Butler: Deputy Prime Minister and First Secretary of State
- Reginald Edward Manningham-Buller, 1st Viscount Dilhorne: Lord High Chancellor of Great Britain
- Quintin Hogg, 2nd Viscount Hailsham: Lord President of the Council and Minister for Science
- Henry Brooke: Home Secretary
- Alec Douglas-Home, 14th Earl of Home: Secretary of State for Foreign Affairs
- Edward Heath: Lord Keeper of the Privy Seal
- Reginald Maudling: Chancellor of the Exchequer
- Duncan Sandys: Secretary of State for the Colonies and Secretary of State for Commonwealth Relations
- Frederick Erroll: President of the Board of Trade
- Iain Macleod: Chancellor of the Duchy of Lancaster
- Sir Edward Boyle: Minister of Education
- John Boyd-Carpenter: Chief Secretary to the Treasury and Paymaster General
- Ernest Marples: Minister of Transport
- Julian Amery: Minister of Aviation
- Peter Thorneycroft: Minister of Defence
- Michael Noble: Secretary of State for Scotland
- John Hare: Minister of Labour
- Christopher Soames: Minister of Agriculture
- Sir Keith Joseph: Minister of Housing and Local Government and Welsh Affairs
- Enoch Powell: Minister of Health
- Bill Deedes: Minister without Portfolio

=== Douglas-Home ministry ===
Douglas-Home ministry
- Cabinet of the United Kingdom
- 1963–1964
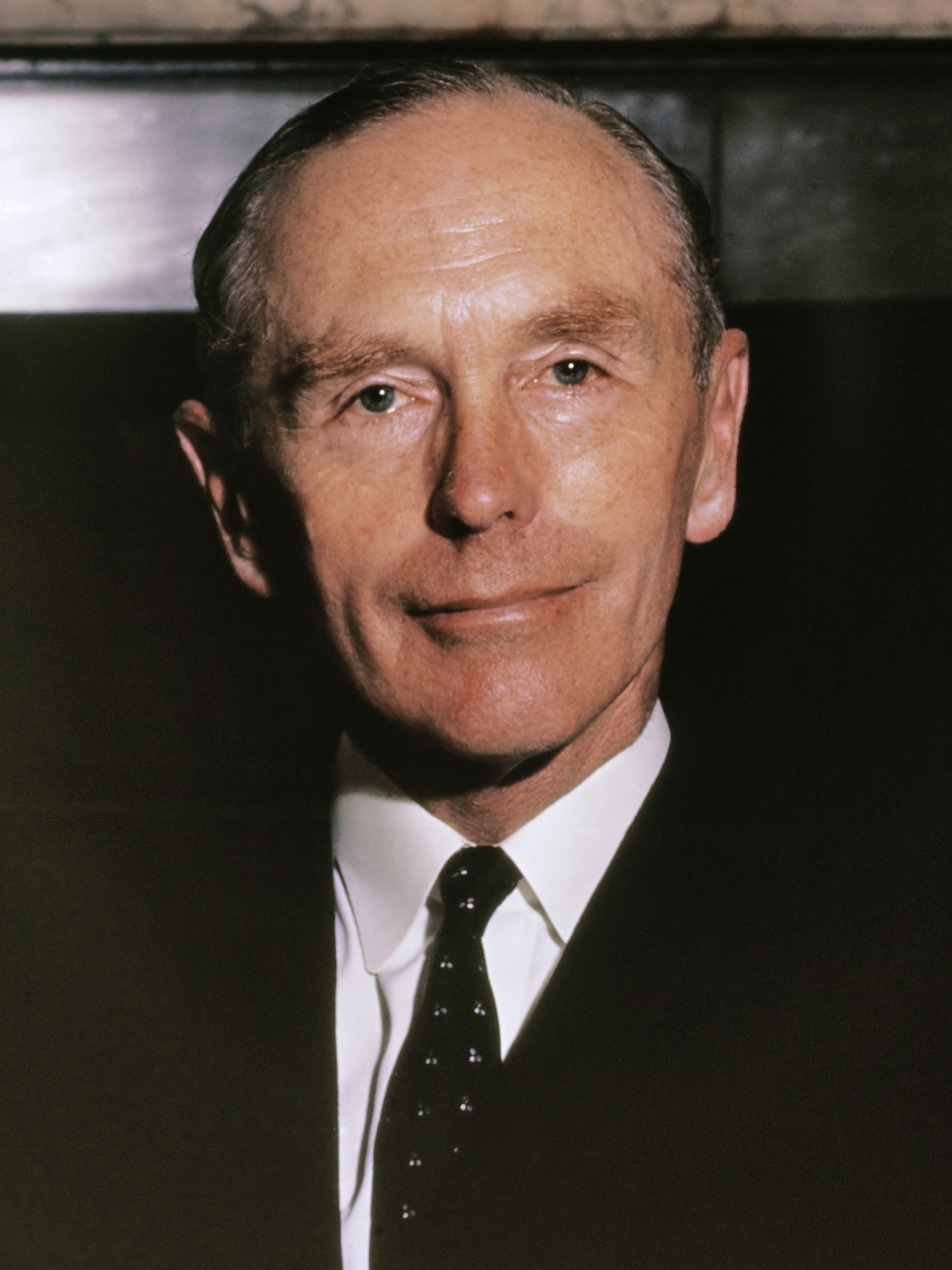
- Douglas-Home (c. 1963)
- Date formed: 19 October 1963
- Date dissolved: 16 October 1964

People and organisations
- Monarch: Elizabeth II
- Prime Minister: Alec Douglas-Home
- Prime Minister's history: 1963–1964
- Member party: Conservative Party
- Status in legislature: Majority
- Opposition party: Labour Party
- Opposition leader: Harold Wilson

History
- Outgoing election: 1964 general election
- Legislature terms: 42nd UK Parliament
- Predecessor: Second Macmillan ministry
- Successor: First Wilson ministry

==== October 1963 – October 1964 ====
- Sir Alec Douglas-Home (Known as the Earl of Home until October 23): Prime Minister and First Lord of the Treasury
- Reginald Manningham-Buller, 1st Viscount Dilhorne: Lord High Chancellor of Great Britain
- Quintin Hogg (Known as Viscount Hailsham until November 20): Lord President of the Council and Minister for Science
- Selwyn Lloyd: Leader of the House of Commons and Lord Keeper of the Privy Seal
- Reginald Maudling: Chancellor of the Exchequer
- Rab Butler: Secretary of State for Foreign Affairs
- Henry Brooke: Home Secretary
- Sir Keith Joseph: Minister of Housing and Local Government
- Peter Thorneycroft: Minister of Defence
- Julian Amery: Minister of Aviation
- Ernest Marples: Minister of Transport
- Frederick Erroll: Minister of Power
- Edward Heath: Secretary of State for Industry, Trade, and Regional Development and President of the Board of Trade
- Duncan Sandys: Secretary of State for the Colonies and Secretary of State for Commonwealth Relations
- Sir Edward Boyle: Minister of Education
- Anthony Barber: Minister of Health
- John Boyd-Carpenter: Chief Secretary to the Treasury and Paymaster General
- Joseph Godber: Minister of Labour
- Geoffrey Rippon: Minister of Public Buildings and Works
- Christopher Soames: Minister of Agriculture, Fisheries and Food
- Michael Noble: Secretary of State for Scotland
- John Hare, 1st Viscount Blakenham: Chancellor of the Duchy of Lancaster
- William Deedes: Minister without Portfolio
- Peter Carrington, 6th Baron Carrington: Leader of the House of Lords and Minister without Portfolio

===== Changes =====
- April 1964 – Quintin Hogg became Secretary of State for Education and Science. Peter Thorneycroft's position became Secretary of State for Defence. Sir Edward Boyle left the cabinet.

== List of ministers ==
Members of the Cabinet are in bold face.

Office	Name	Dates	Notes
Prime Minister and First Lord of the Treasury	**Harold Macmillan**	10 January 1957 – 13 October 1963	
Prime Minister and First Lord of the Treasury	**Alec Douglas-Home**	18 October 1963 – 16 October 1964	Until 23 October 1963, when he renounced his hereditary peerage, he was the Earl of Home and was known as Lord Home
First Secretary of State	**R. A. Butler**	13 July 1962	Office wound up 18 October 1963
Lord High Chancellor of Great Britain	**David Maxwell Fyfe, 1st Viscount Kilmuir**	14 January 1957	Continued in office
Lord High Chancellor of Great Britain	**Reginald Edward Manningham-Buller, 1st Viscount Dilhorne**	13 July 1962	
Lord President of the Council	**Robert Gascoyne-Cecil, 5th Marquess of Salisbury**	13 January 1957	also Leader of the House of Lords
Lord President of the Council	**Alec Douglas-Home, 14th Earl of Home**	29 March 1957	also Leader of the House of Lords
Lord President of the Council	**Quintin Hogg, 2nd Viscount Hailsham**	17 September 1957	
Lord President of the Council	**Alec Douglas-Home, 14th Earl of Home**	14 October 1959	also Leader of the House of Lords
Lord President of the Council	**Qunitin Hogg, 2nd Viscount Hailsham**	27 July 1960	Also Minister for Science until 1964 and Leader of the House of Lords until 20 October 1963
Lord Keeper of the Privy Seal	**R. A. Butler**	13 January 1957	Also Home Secretary and Leader of the House of Commons
Lord Keeper of the Privy Seal	**Qunitin Hogg, 2nd Viscount Hailsham**	14 October 1959	Also Minister for Science
Lord Keeper of the Privy Seal	**Edward Heath**	27 July 1960	
Lord Keeper of the Privy Seal	**Selwyn Lloyd**	20 October 1963	also Leader of the House of Commons
Chancellor of the Exchequer	**Peter Thorneycroft**	13 January 1957	
Chancellor of the Exchequer	**Derick Heathcoat-Amory**	6 January 1958	
Chancellor of the Exchequer	**Selwyn Lloyd**	27 July 1960	
Chancellor of the Exchequer	**Reginald Maudling**	13 July 1962	
Parliamentary Secretary to the Treasury	Edward Heath	17 January 1957	
Parliamentary Secretary to the Treasury	Martin Redmayne	14 October 1959	
Financial Secretary to the Treasury	Enoch Powell	16 January 1957	
Financial Secretary to the Treasury	Jocelyn Simon	6 January 1958	
Financial Secretary to the Treasury	Sir Edward Boyle	22 October 1959	
Financial Secretary to the Treasury	Anthony Barber	16 July 1962	
Financial Secretary to the Treasury	Alan Green	23 October 1963	
Economic Secretary to the Treasury	Nigel Birch	16 January 1957	Office vacant from 6 January 1958
Economic Secretary to the Treasury	Frederick Erroll	23 October 1958	
Economic Secretary to the Treasury	Anthony Barber	22 October 1959	
Economic Secretary to the Treasury	Edward du Cann	16 July 1962	
Economic Secretary to the Treasury	Maurice Macmillan	21 October 1963	
Lords of the Treasury	Martin Redmayne	21 January 1957 – 14 October 1959	
Lords of the Treasury	Peter Legh	21 January 1957 – 17 September 1957	
Lords of the Treasury	Edward Wakefield	21 January 1957 – 23 October 1958	
Lords of the Treasury	Harwood Harrison	21 January 1957 – 16 January 1959	
Lords of the Treasury	Anthony Barber	9 April 1957 – 19 February 1958	
Lords of the Treasury	Richard Brooman-White	28 October 1957 – 21 June 1958	
Lords of the Treasury	Paul Bryan	19 February 1958 – 9 February 1961	
Lords of the Treasury	Michael Hughes-Young	23 October 1958 – 6 March 1962	
Lords of the Treasury	Graeme Bell Finlay	16 January 1959 – 28 October 1960	
Lords of the Treasury	David Gibson-Watt	22 October 1959 – 29 November 1961	
Lords of the Treasury	Robin Chichester-Clark	21 June 1960 – 29 November 1961	
Lords of the Treasury	John Hill	28 October 1960 – 16 October 1964	
Lords of the Treasury	William Whitelaw	6 March 1961 – 16 July 1962	
Lords of the Treasury	John Peel	29 November 1961 – 16 October 1964	
Lords of the Treasury	Michael Noble	29 November 1961 – 13 July 1962	
Lords of the Treasury	Francis Pearson	6 March 1962 – 19 October 1963	
Lords of the Treasury	Gordon Campbell	6 September 1962 – 12 December 1963	
Lords of the Treasury	Michael Hamilton	6 September 1962 – 16 October 1964	
Lords of the Treasury	Martin McLaren	21 November 1963 – 16 October 1964	
Lords of the Treasury	Ian MacArthur	12 December 1963 – 16 October 1964	
Secretary of State for Foreign Affairs	**Selwyn Lloyd**	14 January 1957	
Secretary of State for Foreign Affairs	**Alec Douglas-Home, 14th Earl of Home**	27 July 1960	
Secretary of State for Foreign Affairs	**Rab Butler**	20 October 1963	
Minister of State for Foreign Affairs	Allan Noble	16 January 1957 – 16 January 1959	
Minister of State for Foreign Affairs	David Ormsby-Gore	16 January 1957 – 27 June 1961	
Minister of State for Foreign Affairs	John Profumo	16 January 1959 – 27 July 1960	
Minister of State for Foreign Affairs	Joseph Godber	27 June 1961 – 27 June 1963	
Minister of State for Foreign Affairs	Henry Scrymgeour-Wedderburn, 11th Earl of Dundee	9 October 1961 – 16 October 1964	
Minister of State for Foreign Affairs	Peter Thomas	27 June 1963 – 16 October 1964	
Parliamentary Under-Secretary of State for Foreign Affairs	Archibald Acheson, 6th Earl of Gosford	18 January 1957 – 23 October 1958	
Parliamentary Under-Secretary of State for Foreign Affairs	Ian Harvey	18 January 1957 – 24 November 1958	
Parliamentary Under-Secretary of State for Foreign Affairs	George Petty-FitzMaurice, 8th Marquess of Lansdowne	23 October 1958 – 20 April 1962	
Parliamentary Under-Secretary of State for Foreign Affairs	John Profumo	28 November 1958 – 16 January 1959	
Parliamentary Under-Secretary of State for Foreign Affairs	Robert Allan	16 January 1959 – 7 October 1960	
Parliamentary Under-Secretary of State for Foreign Affairs	Joseph Godber	28 October 1960 – 27 June 1961	
Parliamentary Under-Secretary of State for Foreign Affairs	Peter Thomas	27 June 1961 – 27 June 1963	
Parliamentary Under-Secretary of State for Foreign Affairs	Peter Smithers	16 July 1962 – 29 January 1964	
Parliamentary Under-Secretary of State for Foreign Affairs	Robert Mathew	30 January 1964 – 16 October 1964	
Home Secretary	**R. A. Butler**	13 January 1957	also Leader of the House of Commons until 1961
Home Secretary	**Henry Brooke**	13 July 1963	
Minister of State for Home Affairs	Dennis Vosper	28 October 1960	New office
Minister of State for Home Affairs	David Renton	27 June 1961	
Minister of State for Home Affairs	George Jellicoe, 2nd Earl Jellicoe	17 July 1962	
Minister of State for Home Affairs	Patrick Vanden-Bempde-Johnstone, 4th Baron Derwent	21 October 1963	
Under-Secretary of State for the Home Department	Patricia Hornsby-Smith	18 January 1957 – 22 October 1959	
Under-Secretary of State for the Home Department	Jocelyn Simon	18 January 1957 – 6 January 1958	
Under-Secretary of State for the Home Department	David Renton	17 January 1958 – 27 June 1961	
Under-Secretary of State for the Home Department	Dennis Vosper	22 October 1959 – 28 October 1960	
Under-Secretary of State for the Home Department	Henry Bathurst, 8th Earl Bathurst	8 February 1961 – 16 July 1962	
Under-Secretary of State for the Home Department	Charles Fletcher-Cooke	27 June 1961 – 27 February 1963	
Under-Secretary of State for the Home Department	Christopher Montague Woodhouse	16 July 1962 – 16 October 1964	
Under-Secretary of State for the Home Department	Mervyn Pike	1 March 1963 – 16 October 1964	
First Lord of the Admiralty	George Douglas-Hamilton, 10th Earl of Selkirk	16 January 1957	
First Lord of the Admiralty	Peter Carrington, 6th Baron Carrington	16 October 1959	
First Lord of the Admiralty	George Jellicoe, 2nd Earl Jellicoe	22 October 1963	Office reorganised 1 April 1964 under Ministry of Defence
Parliamentary and Financial Secretary to the Admiralty	Christopher Soames	18 January 1957	
Parliamentary and Financial Secretary to the Admiralty	Robert Allan	17 January 1958	
Parliamentary and Financial Secretary to the Admiralty	Charles Ian Orr-Ewing	16 January 1959	Office vacant 16 October 1959
Civil Lord of the Admiralty	Tam Galbraith	18 January 1957	
Civil Lord of the Admiralty	Ian Orr-Ewing	16 October 1959	
Civil Lord of the Admiralty	John Hay	3 May 1963	
Minister of Agriculture, Fisheries and Food	Derick Heathcoat-Amory	14 January 1957	
Minister of Agriculture, Fisheries and Food	John Hare	6 January 1958	
Minister of Agriculture, Fisheries and Food	Christopher Soames	27 July 1960	
Parliamentary Secretary to the Ministry of Agriculture, Fisheries and Food	Michael Hicks Beach, 2nd Earl St Aldwyn	18 January 1957	
Parliamentary Secretary to the Ministry of Agriculture, Fisheries and Food	Joseph Godber	18 January 1957 – 28 October 1960	
Parliamentary Secretary to the Ministry of Agriculture, Fisheries and Food	Geoffrey Noel Waldegrave, 12th Earl Waldegrave	27 June 1958 – 16 July 1962	
Parliamentary Secretary to the Ministry of Agriculture, Fisheries and Food	William Vane	28 October 1960 – 16 July 1962	
Parliamentary Secretary to the Ministry of Agriculture, Fisheries and Food	Rowland Denys Guy Winn, 4th Baron St Oswald	16 July 1962 – 16 October 1964	
Parliamentary Secretary to the Ministry of Agriculture, Fisheries and Food	James Scott-Hopkins	16 July 1962 – 16 October 1964	
Secretary of State for Air	George Ward	16 January 1957	
Secretary of State for Air	Julian Amery	28 October 1960	
Secretary of State for Air	Hugh Fraser	16 July 1962	Office reorganised under Ministry of Defence 1 April 1964
Under-Secretary of State for Air	Ian Orr-Ewing	18 January 1957	
Under-Secretary of State for Air	Airey Neave	16 January 1959	
Under-Secretary of State for Air	William Taylor	16 October 1959	
Under-Secretary of State for Air	Julian Ridsdale	16 January 1962	
Minister of Aviation	Duncan Sandys	14 October 1959	
Minister of Aviation	Peter Thorneycroft	27 July 1960	
Minister of Aviation	Julian Amery	16 July 1962	
Parliamentary Secretary for Aviation	Geoffrey Rippon	22 October 1959	
Parliamentary Secretary for Aviation	Montague Woodhouse	9 October 1961	
Parliamentary Secretary for Aviation	Basil de Ferranti	16 July 1962	
Parliamentary Secretary for Aviation	Neil Marten	3 December 1962	
Secretary of State for the Colonies	**Alan Lennox-Boyd**	14 January 1957	
Secretary of State for the Colonies	**Iain Macleod**	14 October 1959	
Secretary of State for the Colonies	**Reginald Maudling**	9 October 1961	
Secretary of State for the Colonies	**Duncan Sandys**	13 July 1962	Joint with Commonwealth Relations
Minister of State for the Colonies	John Drummond, 8th Earl of Perth	16 January 1957	
Minister of State for the Colonies	George Petty-FitzMaurice, 8th Marquess of Lansdowne	20 April 1962	Joint with Commonwealth Relations from 21 October 1963
Under-Secretary of State for the Colonies	John Profumo	17 January 1957	
Under-Secretary of State for the Colonies	Julian Amery	28 November 1958	
Under-Secretary of State for the Colonies	Hugh Fraser	28 October 1960	
Under-Secretary of State for the Colonies	Nigel Fisher	16 July 1962 – 16 October 1964	
Under-Secretary of State for the Colonies	Richard Hornby	24 October 1963 – 16 October 1964	
Secretary of State for Commonwealth Relations	**Alec Douglas-Home, 14th Earl of Home**	14 January 1957	also Leader of the House of Lords from 19 March 1957
Secretary of State for Commonwealth Relations	**Duncan Sandys**	27 July 1960	Jointly with Colonial Office from 13 July 1962
Minister of State for Commonwealth Relations	Cuthbert Alport	22 October 1959 – 8 February 1961	
Minister of State for Commonwealth Relations	Andrew Cavendish, 11th Duke of Devonshire	6 September 1962 – 16 October 1964	With Colonial Office from 21 October 1963
Under-Secretary of State for Commonwealth Relations	Cuthbert Alport	18 January 1957	
Under-Secretary of State for Commonwealth Relations	Richard Thompson	22 October 1959	
Under-Secretary of State for Commonwealth Relations	Andrew Cavendish, 11th Duke of Devonshire	28 October 1960 – 6 September 1962	
Under-Secretary of State for Commonwealth Relations	Bernard Braine	8 February 1961 – 16 July 1962	
Under-Secretary of State for Commonwealth Relations	John Tilney	16 July 1962 – 16 October 1964	
Minister of Defence	**Duncan Sandys**	13 January 1957	
Minister of Defence	**Harold Watkinson**	14 October 1959	
Minister of Defence	**Peter Thorneycroft**	13 July 1962	Secretary of State for Defence from 1 April 1964
Parliamentary Secretary to the Ministry of Defence	Stormont Mancroft, 2nd Baron Mancroft	18 January 1957	Office vacant 11 June 1957
Minister of State for Air	Hugh Fraser	1 April 1964	
Minister of State for Army	James Ramsden	1 April 1964	
Minister of State for Navy	George Jellicoe, 2nd Earl Jellicoe	1 April 1964	
Under-Secretary of State for Air	Julian Ridsdale	1 April 1964	
Under-Secretary of State for Army	Peter Kirk	1 April 1964	
Under-Secretary of State for Navy	John Hay	1 April 1964	
Minister of Education	**Quintin Hogg, 2nd Viscount Hailsham**	13 January 1957	
Minister of Education	**Geoffrey Lloyd**	17 September 1957	
Minister of Education	**Sir David Eccles**	14 October 1959	
Minister of Education	**Sir Edward Boyle**	13 July 1962	
Minister of Education	**Quintin Hogg**	1 April 1964	Secretary of State for Education and Science
Minister of State for Education	**Sir Edward Boyle**	1 April 1964	Responsible for higher education and science
Minister of State for Education	Peter Legh	1 April 1964	Office not in Cabinet
Parliamentary Secretary to the Ministry of Education	Sir Edward Boyle	18 January 1957	
Parliamentary Secretary to the Ministry of Education	Kenneth Thompson	22 October 1959	
Parliamentary Secretary to the Ministry of Education	Christopher Chataway	16 July 1962	Offices reorganised 1 April 1964
Under-Secretary of State for Education	Frederick Ponsonby, 10th Earl of Bessborough	1 April 1964	
Under-Secretary of State for Education	Christopher Chataway	1 April 1964	
Minister of Health	Dennis Vosper	16 January 1957	
Minister of Health	Derek Walker-Smith	17 September 1957	
Minister of Health	Enoch Powell	27 July 1960	In Cabinet from 13 July 1962
Minister of Health	**Anthony Barber**	20 October 1963	
Parliamentary Secretary to the Ministry of Health	John Vaughan-Morgan	18 January 1957	
Parliamentary Secretary to the Ministry of Health	Richard Thompson	17 September 1957	
Parliamentary Secretary to the Ministry of Health	Edith Pitt	22 October 1959	
Parliamentary Secretary to the Ministry of Health	Bernard Braine	16 July 1962 – 16 October 1964	
Parliamentary Secretary to the Ministry of Health	Peter Legh, 4th Baron Newton	6 September 1962 – 1 April 1964	
Parliamentary Secretary to the Ministry of Health	Peter Kerr, 12th Marquess of Lothian	24 March 1964 – 16 October 1964	
Minister of Housing, Local Government and Welsh Affairs	**Henry Brooke**	13 January 1957	
Minister of Housing, Local Government and Welsh Affairs	**Charles Hill**	9 October 1961	
Minister of Housing, Local Government and Welsh Affairs	Sir Keith Joseph	13 July 1962	
Minister of State for Welsh Affairs	David Lewis, 1st Baron Brecon	12 December 1957	
Parliamentary Secretary to the Ministry of Housing and Local Government	Reginald Bevins	18 January 1957	
Parliamentary Secretary to the Ministry of Housing and Local Government	Sir Keith Joseph	22 October 1959 – 9 October 1961	
Parliamentary Secretary to the Ministry of Housing and Local Government	George Jellicoe, 2nd Earl Jellicoe	27 June 1961 – 16 July 1962	
Parliamentary Secretary to the Ministry of Housing and Local Government	Geoffrey Rippon	9 October 1961 – 16 July 1962	
Parliamentary Secretary to the Ministry of Housing and Local Government	Frederick Corfield	16 July 1962 – 16 October 1964	
Parliamentary Secretary to the Ministry of Housing and Local Government	Edward Astley, 22nd Baron Hastings	3 December 1962 – 16 October 1964	
Minister of Labour and National Service	**Iain Macleod**	14 January 1957	
Minister of Labour and National Service	**Edward Heath**	14 October 1959	
Minister of Labour and National Service	**John Hare**	27 July 1960	
Minister of Labour and National Service	Joseph Godber	20 October 1963	
Parliamentary Secretary to the Ministry of Labour	Robert Carr	19 January 1957	
Parliamentary Secretary to the Ministry of Labour	Richard Wood	14 April 1958	
Parliamentary Secretary to the Ministry of Labour	Peter Thomas	22 October 1959	
Parliamentary Secretary to the Ministry of Labour	Alan Green	27 June 1961	
Parliamentary Secretary to the Ministry of Labour	William Whitelaw	16 July 1962	
Chancellor of the Duchy of Lancaster	**Charles Hill**	13 January 1957	
Chancellor of the Duchy of Lancaster	**Iain Macleod**	9 October 1961	also Leader of the House of Commons
Chancellor of the Duchy of Lancaster	**John Hare, 1st Viscount Blakenham**	20 October 1963	
Paymaster General	Reginald Maudling	16 January 1957	Office in Cabinet from 17 September 1957
Paymaster General	Percy Mills, 1st Baron Mills	14 October 1959	
Paymaster General	Henry Brooke	9 October 1961	Also Chief Secretary to the Treasury
Paymaster General	John Boyd-Carpenter	13 July 1962	
Minister of Pensions and National Insurance	John Boyd-Carpenter	16 January 1957	
Minister of Pensions and National Insurance	Niall Macpherson	16 July 1962	
Parliamentary Secretary to the Ministry of Pensions	Edith Pitt	19 January 1957 – 22 October 1959	
Parliamentary Secretary to the Ministry of Pensions	Richard Wood	19 January 1957 – 14 April 1958	
Parliamentary Secretary to the Ministry of Pensions	William Vane	14 April 1958 – 20 October 1960	
Parliamentary Secretary to the Ministry of Pensions	Patricia Hornsby-Smith	22 October 1959 – 31 August 1961	
Parliamentary Secretary to the Ministry of Pensions	Bernard Braine	28 October 1960 – 8 February 1961	
Parliamentary Secretary to the Ministry of Pensions	Richard Sharples	8 February 1961 – 16 July 1962	
Parliamentary Secretary to the Ministry of Pensions	Margaret Thatcher	9 October 1961 – 16 October 1964	
Parliamentary Secretary to the Ministry of Pensions	Lynch Maydon	16 July 1962 – 16 October 1964	
Minister without Portfolio	Geoffrey FitzClarence, 5th Earl of Munster	16 January 1957	
Minister without Portfolio	Stormont Mancroft, 2nd Baron Mancroft	11 June 1957	
Minister without Portfolio	Henry Scrymgeour-Wedderburn, 11th Earl of Dundee	23 October 1958	
Minister without Portfolio	Percy Mills, 1st Baron Mills	9 October 1961 – 14 July 1962	Office in Cabinet
Minister without Portfolio	William Deedes	13 July 1962 – 16 October 1964	
Minister without Portfolio	Peter Carrington, 6th Baron Carrington	20 October 1963 – 16 October 1964	also Leader of the House of Lords
Postmaster-General	Ernest Marples	16 January 1957	
Postmaster-General	Reginald Bevins	22 October 1959	
Assistant Postmaster-General	Kenneth Thompson	18 January 1957	
Assistant Postmaster-General	Mervyn Pike	22 October 1959	
Assistant Postmaster-General	Raymond Llewellyn Mawby	1 March 1963	
Minister of Power	**Percy Mills, 1st Baron Mills**	13 January 1957	
Minister of Power	Richard Wood	14 October 1959	Office not in Cabinet
Minister of Power	**Frederick Erroll**	20 October 1963	Office back in Cabinet
Parliamentary Secretary to the Ministry of Power	David Renton	18 January 1957	
Parliamentary Secretary to the Ministry of Power	Sir Ian Horobin	17 January 1958	
Parliamentary Secretary to the Ministry of Power	John George	22 October 1959	
Parliamentary Secretary to the Ministry of Power	John Peyton	25 June 1962	
Minister for Science	**Quintin Hogg, 2nd Viscount Hailsham**	14 October 1959	also Leader of the House of Lords 27 July 1960 – 20 October 1963; From 1 April 1964 Secretary of State for Education and Science
Secretary of State for Scotland	**John Maclay**	13 January 1957	
Secretary of State for Scotland	**Michael Noble**	13 July 1962	
Minister of State for Scotland	Thomas Galbraith, 1st Baron Strathclyde	17 January 1957	
Minister of State for Scotland	Nigel Forbes, 22nd Lord Forbes	23 October 1958	
Minister of State for Scotland	Jack Nixon Browne	22 October 1959	Lord Craigton
Under-Secretary of State for Scotland	Jack Nixon Browne	18 January 1957 – 22 October 1959	
Under-Secretary of State for Scotland	Niall Macpherson	19 January 1957 – 28 October 1960	
Under-Secretary of State for Scotland	Lord John Hope	18 January 1957 – 22 October 1959	
Under-Secretary of State for Scotland	Tam Galbraith	22 October 1959 – 8 November 1962	
Under-Secretary of State for Scotland	Gilmour Leburn	22 October 1959 – 15 August 1963	
Under-Secretary of State for Scotland	Richard Brooman-White	28 October 1960 – 12 December 1963	
Under-Secretary of State for Scotland	Priscilla Buchan, Baroness Tweedsmuir	3 December 1962 – 16 October 1964	
Under-Secretary of State for Scotland	Anthony Stodart	19 August 1963 – 16 October 1964	
Under-Secretary of State for Scotland	Gordon Campbell	12 December 1963 – 16 October 1964	
Minister of Supply	Aubrey Jones	16 January 1957	Office wound up 22 October 1959
Parliamentary Secretary to the Ministry of Supply	William Taylor	18 January 1957	Office wound up 22 October 1959
Minister for Technical Cooperation	Dennis Vosper	27 June 1961	
Minister for Technical Cooperation	Robert Carr	9 May 1963	
President of the Board of Trade	**Sir David Eccles**	13 January 1957	
President of the Board of Trade	**Reginald Maudling**	14 October 1959	
President of the Board of Trade	**Frederick Erroll**	9 October 1961	
President of the Board of Trade	**Edward Heath**	20 October 1963	Also Secretary of State for Industry, Trade and Regional Development
Minister of State for Trade	Derek Walker-Smith	16 January 1957	
Minister of State for Trade	John Vaughan-Morgan	17 September 1957	
Minister of State for Trade	Frederick Erroll	22 October 1959	
Minister of State for Trade	Sir Keith Joseph	9 October 1961	
Minister of State for Trade	Alan Green	16 July 1962 – 23 October 1963	
Minister of State for Trade	Patrick Vanden-Bempde-Johnstone, 4th Baron Derwent	6 September 1962 – 23 October 1963	
Minister of State for Trade	Niall Macpherson, 1st Baron Drumalbyn	23 October 1963 – 16 October 1964	Formerly N Macpherson
Minister of State for Trade	Edward du Cann	21 October 1963 – 16 October 1964	
Parliamentary Secretary to the Board of Trade	Frederick Erroll	18 January 1957	
Parliamentary Secretary to the Board of Trade	John Rodgers	24 October 1958	
Parliamentary Secretary to the Board of Trade	Niall Macpherson	28 October 1960	
Parliamentary Secretary to the Board of Trade	David Price	17 July 1962	
Minister of Transport and Civil Aviation	Harold Watkinson	13 January 1957	Civil aviation separated 14 October 1959
Minister of Transport and Civil Aviation	Ernest Marples	14 October 1959	
Parliamentary Secretary to the Ministry of Transport	Richard Nugent	18 January 1957 – 22 October 1959	
Parliamentary Secretary to the Ministry of Transport	Airey Neave	18 January 1957 – 16 January 1959	
Parliamentary Secretary to the Ministry of Transport	John Hay	16 January 1959 – 3 May 1963	
Parliamentary Secretary to the Ministry of Transport	John Cavendish, 5th Baron Chesham	22 October 1959 – 16 October 1964	
Parliamentary Secretary to the Ministry of Transport	John Hughes-Hallett	26 April 1961 – 16 October 1964	
Parliamentary Secretary to the Ministry of Transport	Tam Galbraith	3 May 1963 – 16 October 1964	
Secretary of State for War	John Hare	16 January 1957	
Secretary of State for War	Christopher Soames	6 January 1958	
Secretary of State for War	John Profumo	27 July 1960	
Secretary of State for War	Joseph Godber	27 June 1963	
Secretary of State for War	James Ramsden	21 October 1963	Reorganised under Ministry of Defence 1 April 1964
Under-Secretary of State and Financial Secretary for War	Julian Amery	18 January 1957	
Under-Secretary of State and Financial Secretary for War	Hugh Fraser	28 November 1958	
Under-Secretary of State and Financial Secretary for War	James Ramsden	28 October 1960	
Under-Secretary of State and Financial Secretary for War	Peter Kirk	24 October 1963	
Minister of Works	Hugh Molson	16 January 1957	
Minister of Works	Lord John Hope	22 October 1959	
Minister of Works	Geoffrey Rippon	16 July 1962	Minister of Public Building and Works. In Cabinet from 20 October 1963
Parliamentary Secretary to the Ministry of Works	Harmar Nicholls	18 January 1957	
Parliamentary Secretary to the Ministry of Works	Richard Thompson	28 October 1960	
Parliamentary Secretary to the Ministry of Works	Richard Sharples	16 July 1962	
Attorney General	Sir Reginald Manningham-Buller	17 January 1957	
Attorney General	Sir John Hobson	16 July 1962	
Solicitor General	Sir Harry Hylton-Foster	17 January 1957	
Solicitor General	Sir Jocelyn Simon	22 October 1959	
Solicitor General	Sir John Hobson	8 February 1962	
Solicitor General	Sir Peter Rawlinson	19 July 1962	
Lord Advocate	William Rankine Milligan	17 January 1957	
Lord Advocate	William Grant	5 April 1960	
Lord Advocate	Ian Shearer	12 October 1962	Not an MP
Solicitor General for Scotland	William Grant	17 January 1957	
Solicitor General for Scotland	David Colville Anderson	11 May 1960	
Solicitor General for Scotland	Norman Wylie	27 April 1964	
Treasurer of the Household	Hendrie Oakshott	19 January 1957	
Treasurer of the Household	Peter Legh	16 January 1959	Lord Newton
Treasurer of the Household	Edward Wakefield	21 June 1960	
Treasurer of the Household	Michael Hughes-Young	6 March 1962	
Comptroller of the Household	Gerald Wills	19 January 1957	Knighted
Comptroller of the Household	Edward Wakefield	23 October 1958	
Comptroller of the Household	Harwood Harrison	16 January 1959	
Comptroller of the Household	Robin Chichester-Clark	29 November 1961	
Vice-Chamberlain of the Household	Richard Thompson	21 January 1957	
Vice-Chamberlain of the Household	Peter Legh	17 September 1957	
Vice-Chamberlain of the Household	Edward Wakefield	16 January 1959	
Vice-Chamberlain of the Household	Richard Brooman-White	21 June 1960	
Vice-Chamberlain of the Household	Graeme Finlay	28 October 1960	
Captain of the Gentlemen-at-Arms	Hugh Fortescue, 5th Earl Fortescue	21 January 1957	
Captain of the Gentlemen-at-Arms	Michael Hicks Beach, 2nd Earl St Aldwyn	27 June 1958	
Captain of the Yeomen of the Guard	William Onslow, 6th Earl of Onslow	21 January 1957	
Captain of the Yeomen of the Guard	Peter Richard Legh, 4th Baron Newton	28 October 1960	
Captain of the Yeomen of the Guard	John Goschen, 3rd Viscount Goschen	6 September 1962	
Lords in Waiting	Bladen Hawke, 9th Baron Hawke	21 January 1957 – 11 June 1957	
Lords in Waiting	Thomas Fairfax, 13th Lord Fairfax of Cameron	21 January 1957 – 21 June 1957	
Lords in Waiting	John Cavendish, 5th Baron Chesham	21 January 1957 – 22 October 1959	
Lords in Waiting	George Petty-FitzMaurice, 8th Marquess of Lansdowne	11 June 1957 – 23 October 1958	
Lords in Waiting	Henry Bathurst, 8th Earl Bathurst	17 September 1957 – 8 February 1961	
Lords in Waiting	Archibald Acheson, 6th Earl of Gosford	23 October 1958 – 22 October 1959	
Lords in Waiting	Rowland Winn, 4th Baron St Oswald	22 October 1959 – 16 July 1962	
Lords in Waiting	George Jellicoe, 2nd Earl Jellicoe	8 February 1961 – 27 June 1961	
Lords in Waiting	Edward Astley, 22nd Baron Hastings	6 March 1961 – 3 December 1962	
Lords in Waiting	Bertram Bowyer, 2nd Baron Denham	27 June 1961 – 16 October 1964	
Lords in Waiting	Peter Kerr, 12th Marquess of Lothian	6 September 1962 – 3 March 1964	
Lords in Waiting	Robert Shirley, 13th Earl Ferrers	3 December 1962 – 10 October 1964	

Preceded by Eden ministry	Government of the United Kingdom; 1957–1964	Succeeded by First Wilson ministry
