= Paymaster General =

UK government ministerial position

United Kingdom His Majesty's Paymaster General
- Royal Arms of His Majesty's Government

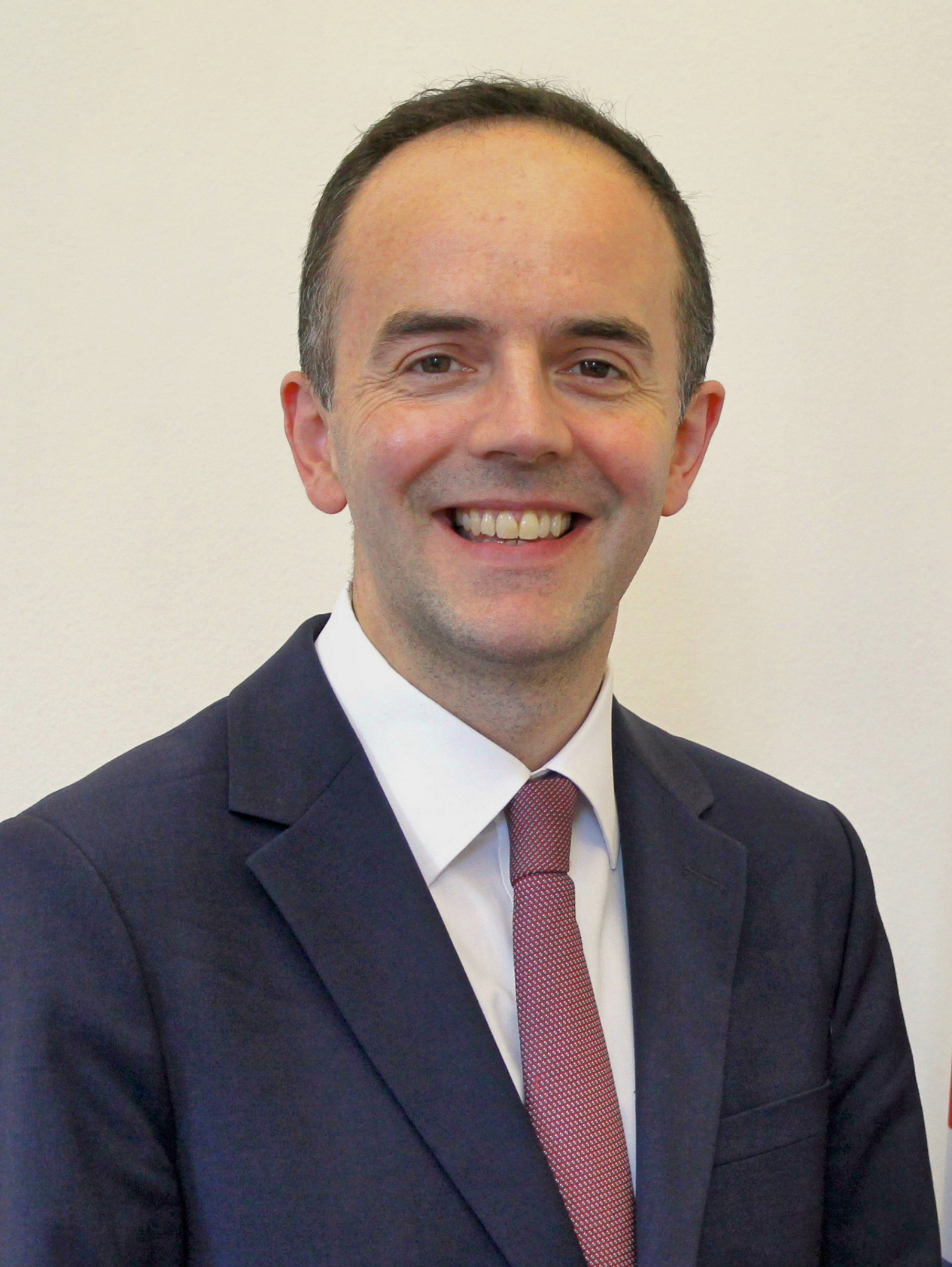
- Incumbent; James Murray since 21 July 2026
- HM Treasury
- Style: Paymaster General (informal); The Right Honourable (formal; within the UK and Commonwealth)
- Appointer: The King (on the advice of the Prime Minister)
- Inaugural holder: Henry Parnell
- Formation: 27 April 1836
- Website: Official website

His Majesty's Paymaster General or HM Paymaster General is a ministerial position in HM Treasury of the United Kingdom. The position is currently held by James Murray of the Labour Co-op Party.

== History ==
Paymaster General Act 1835 (Note: The citation of this act by this short title was authorised by section 1 of, and the first schedule to, the Short Titles Act 1896. Due to the repeal of those provisions it is now authorised by section 19(2) of the Interpretation Act 1978.)
- Act of Parliament
- Parliament of the United Kingdom
- Long title: An Act for consolidating the Offices of Paymaster General, Paymaster and Treasurer of Chelsea Hospital, Treasurer of the Navy, and Treasurer of the Ordnance.
- Citation: 5 & 6 Will. 4. c. 35
- Territorial extent: United Kingdom

Dates
- Royal assent: 25 August 1835
- Commencement: 25 August 1835 (Note: Section 1.)
Other legislation
Amended by	Statute Law Revision Act 1874; House of Commons Disqualification Act 1957; Statute Law (Repeals) Act 1977; Statute Law (Repeals) Act 1981
Relates to	Paymaster General Act 1848

Status: Partially repealed

Text of statute as originally enacted

Revised text of statute as amended

Text of the Paymaster General Act 1835 as in force today (including any amendments) within the United Kingdom, from legislation.gov.uk.

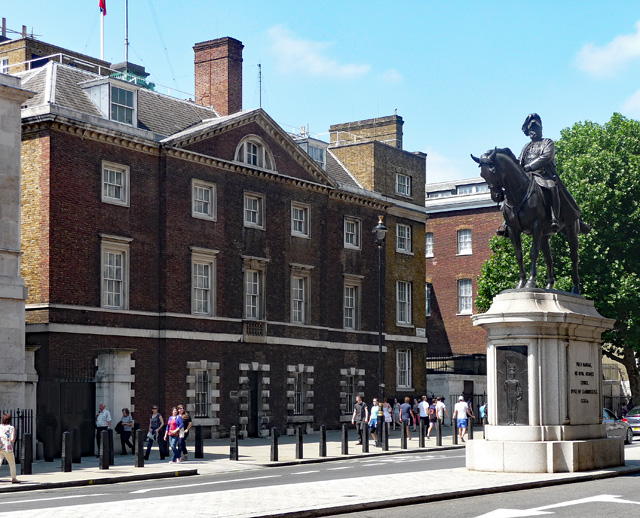
Until 1939 the Office of the Paymaster General was at 36 Whitehall (an extension of Horse Guards formerly occupied by the Paymaster to the Forces).

The post was created by the Paymaster General Act 1835 (5 & 6 Will. 4. c. 35) by the merger of the positions of the offices of the Paymaster of the Forces (1661–1836), the Treasurer of the Navy (1546–1835), the Paymaster and Treasurer of Chelsea Hospital (responsible for Army pensions) (1681–1835) and the Treasurer of the Ordnance (1670–1835).

Paymaster General Act 1848
- Act of Parliament
- Parliament of the United Kingdom
- Long title: An Act for consolidating the Offices of Paymasters of Exchequer Bills and Paymaster of Civil Services with the Office of Paymaster General, and for making other Provisions in regard to the consolidated Offices.
- Citation: 11 & 12 Vict. c. 55
- Territorial extent: United Kingdom

Dates
- Royal assent: 14 August 1848
- Commencement: 14 August 1848
Other legislation
Amended by	Statute Law Revision Act 1875; Statute Law Revision Act 1891; Statute Law Revision Act 1959; Statute Law (Repeals) Act 1977
Relates to	Paymaster General Act 1835

Status: Partially repealed

Text of statute as originally enacted

Revised text of statute as amended

Text of the Paymaster General Act 1848 as in force today (including any amendments) within the United Kingdom, from legislation.gov.uk.

Initially, the Paymaster General only had responsibilities in relation to the armed services but two more offices were merged into that of Paymaster General by the Paymaster General Act 1848 (11 & 12 Vict. c. 55): the Paymaster of Exchequer Bills (1723–1848) and the Paymaster of the Civil Service (1834–1848), the latter followed by its Irish counterpart by the Public Works (Ireland) Act 1861 (24 & 25 Vict. c. 71). They thus became 'the principal paying agent of the government and the banker for all government departments except the revenue departments and the National Debt Office'.

From 1848 to 1868, the post was held concurrently with that of Vice-President of the Board of Trade.

The longest-serving holder of the post was Dawn Primarolo, whose portfolio covered HM Customs and Excise and the Inland Revenue (which during her tenure became merged as HM Revenue and Customs) and who served from 1999 to 2007.

== Role ==
Today, the Paymaster General is usually a minister without portfolio available for any duties which the government of the day may designate. The post may be combined with another office, or may be left unfilled.

Though the Paymaster General was titular head of the Paymaster General's Office, their executive functions were delegated to the Assistant Paymaster General, a permanent civil servant who (though acting in the name of the Paymaster General) was answerable to the Chancellor of the Exchequer.

=== Office of HM Paymaster General ===
The Paymaster General was formerly in nominal charge (and at one time in actual charge) of the Office of HM Paymaster General (OPG), which held accounts at the Bank of England on behalf of government departments and selected other public bodies. Funds which were made available from the Consolidated Fund were then channelled into OPG accounts, from where they were used by the relevant body. OPG operated a full range of accounts and banking transaction services, including cheque and credit, BACS and CHAPS services for its customers via an electronic banking system. Integration of OPG accounts held with commercial banks was provided by the private company Xafinity Paymaster which is now part of the Equiniti group.

However, in 2008, the government announced that the Office of the Paymaster General would be incorporated into a new body, the Government Banking Service, which also provides banking operations for HM Revenue & Customs and National Savings and Investments. Following the Bank of England's decision to withdraw from providing retail banking services, retail banking and payment services for the GBS are provided by a range of financial institutions including Barclays, Citibank, NatWest, and Worldpay, although the Bank of England still plays a role in managing the government's higher level accounts.

== List of paymasters general ==
=== 19th century ===
- Sir Henry Parnell, 4th Baronet 1836–1841
- Edward Stanley 1841
- Sir Edward Knatchbull, 9th Baronet 1841–1845
- Bingham Baring 1845–1846
- Thomas Babington Macaulay 1846–1848
- Granville Leveson-Gower, 2nd Earl Granville 1848–1852
- Edward Stanley, 2nd Baron Stanley of Alderley 1852
- Charles Abbot, 2nd Baron Colchester 1852
- Edward Stanley, 2nd Baron Stanley of Alderley 1853–1855
- Edward Pleydell-Bouverie 1855
- Robert Lowe 1855–1858
- Richard Hely-Hutchinson, 4th Earl of Donoughmore 1858–1859
- Algernon Percy, Lord Lovaine 1859
- James Wilson 1859
- William Cowper 1859–1860
- William Hutt 1860–1865
- George Goschen 1865–1866
- William Monsell 1866
- Stephen Cave 1866–1868
- Frederick Hamilton-Temple-Blackwood, 1st Earl of Dufferin 1868–1872
- Hugh Childers 1872–1873
- William Adam 1873–1874
- Stephen Cave 1874–1880
- David Plunket 1880
- George Glyn, 2nd Baron Wolverton 1880–1885
- Frederick Lygon, 6th Earl Beauchamp 1885–1886
- Thomas Hovell-Thurlow-Cumming-Bruce, 5th Baron Thurlow 1886
- Frederick Lygon, 6th Earl Beauchamp 1886–1887
- Adelbert Brownlow-Cust, 3rd Earl Brownlow 1887–1889
- Victor Child Villiers, 7th Earl of Jersey 1889–1890
- Robert Windsor-Clive, 14th Baron Windsor 1890–1892
- Charles Seale-Hayne 1892–1895
- John Hope, 7th Earl of Hopetoun 1895–1899
- Charles Spencer-Churchill, 9th Duke of Marlborough 1899–1902

=== 20th century ===
- Savile Crossley 1902–1905
- Richard Causton (1st Baron Southwark after 13 July 1910) 1905–1910
- Ivor Guest, 1st Baron Ashby St Ledgers 1910–1912
- Edward Strachey, 1st Baron Strachie 1912–1915
- Thomas Legh, 2nd Baron Newton 1915–1916
- Arthur Henderson 1916
- Joseph Compton-Rickett 1916–1919
- Tudor Walters 1919–1922
- Office vacant 1922–1923
- Neville Chamberlain 1923
- William Joynson-Hicks 1923
- Archibald Boyd-Carpenter 1923–1924
- Harry Gosling 1924
- Office vacant 1924–1925
- George Sutherland-Leveson-Gower, 5th Duke of Sutherland 1925–1928
- Richard Onslow, 5th Earl of Onslow 1928–1929
- Sydney Arnold 1929–1931
- Office vacant 1931
- Tudor Walters 1931
- Ernest Lamb, 1st Baron Rochester 1931–1935
- Robert Hutchison, 1st Baron Hutchison of Montrose 1935–1938
- Geoffrey FitzClarence, 5th Earl of Munster 1938–1939
- Edward Turnour, 6th Earl Winterton 1939
- Office vacant 1939–1940
- Robert Gascoyne-Cecil, Viscount Cranborne 1940
- Office vacant 1940–1941
- Maurice Hankey 1941–1942
- William Jowitt 1942
- Frederick Lindemann, 1st Baron Cherwell 1942–1945
- Office vacant 1945–1946
- Arthur Greenwood 9 July 1946 Lab
- Hilary Marquand 5 March 1947 Lab
- Christopher Addison, 1st Viscount Addison 2 July 1948 also Leader of the House of Lords Lab
- Gordon Macdonald, 1st Baron Macdonald of Gwaenysgor 1 April 1949 Lab

Paymaster General	Term of office		Concurrent office(s)	Political party	Prime Minister
Frederick Lindemann; 1st Viscount Cherwell	30 October 1951	11 November 1953		Conservative	Winston Churchill (III)
George Douglas-Hamilton; 10th Earl of Selkirk	11 November 1953	20 October 1955		Conservative	Winston Churchill (III)
Office vacant	20 October 1955	18 October 1956		Conservative	Anthony Eden (Eden)
Walter Monckton; MP for Bristol West	18 October 1956	16 January 1957		Conservative	Anthony Eden (Eden)
Reginald Maudling; MP for Barnet	16 January 1957	14 October 1959		Conservative	Harold Macmillan (I)
Percy Mills; 1st Viscount Mills	14 October 1959	9 October 1961		Conservative	Harold Macmillan (II)
Henry Brooke; MP for Hampstead	9 October 1961	13 July 1962	Chief Secretary to the Treasury	Conservative	Harold Macmillan (II)
John Boyd-Carpenter; MP for Kingston-upon-Thames	13 July 1962	19 October 1964	Chief Secretary to the Treasury	Conservative	Alec Douglas-Home (Douglas-Home)
George Wigg; MP for Dudley	19 October 1964	12 November 1967		Labour	Harold Wilson (I & II)
Office vacant	12 November 1967	6 April 1968		Labour	Harold Wilson (II)
Edward Shackleton; Baron Shackleton	6 April 1968	1 November 1968		Labour	Harold Wilson (II)
Judith Hart; MP for Clydesdale	1 November 1968	6 October 1969		Labour	Harold Wilson (II)
Harold Lever; MP for Manchester Cheetham	6 October 1969	23 June 1970		Labour	Harold Wilson (II)
David Eccles; 1st Viscount Eccles	23 June 1970	2 December 1973	Minister for the Arts	Conservative	Edward Heath (Heath)
Maurice Macmillan; MP for Farnham	2 December 1973	4 March 1974		Conservative	Edward Heath (Heath)
Edmund Dell; MP for Birkenhead	4 March 1974	10 September 1976		Labour	Harold Wilson (III & IV)
Shirley Williams; MP for Hitchin	10 September 1976	4 May 1979	Secretary of State for Education and Science	Labour	James Callaghan (Callaghan)
Angus Maude; MP for Stratford-on-Avon	4 May 1979	5 January 1981		Conservative	Margaret Thatcher (I)
Francis Pym; MP for Cambridgeshire	5 January 1981	14 September 1981	Chancellor of the Duchy of Lancaster (5 January 1981 – 14 September 1981) Leader of the House of Commons (5 January 1981 – 5 April 1982)	Conservative	Margaret Thatcher (I)
Cecil Parkinson; MP for South Hertfordshire	14 September 1981	11 June 1983	Chancellor of the Duchy of Lancaster (6 April 1982 – 11 June 1983)	Conservative	Margaret Thatcher (I)
Office vacant	11 June 1983	11 September 1984		Conservative	Margaret Thatcher (II)
John Gummer; MP for Suffolk Coastal	11 September 1984	1 September 1985		Conservative	Margaret Thatcher (II)
Kenneth Clarke; MP for Rushcliffe	2 September 1985	13 July 1987	Minister of State for Employment	Conservative	Margaret Thatcher (II)
Peter Brooke; MP for City of London and Westminster South	13 July 1987	24 July 1989		Conservative	Margaret Thatcher (III)
Malcolm Sinclair; 20th Earl of Caithness	25 July 1989	14 July 1990		Conservative	Margaret Thatcher (III)
Richard Ryder; MP for Mid Norfolk	14 July 1990	28 November 1990		Conservative	John Major (I)
John Ganzoni; 2nd Baron Belstead	28 November 1990	11 April 1992	Minister of State for Northern Ireland	Conservative	John Major (I)
John Cope; MP for Northavon	14 April 1992	20 July 1994		Conservative	John Major (lI)
David Heathcoat-Amory; MP for Wells	20 July 1994	20 July 1996		Conservative	John Major (lI)
David Willetts; MP for Havant	20 July 1996	21 November 1996		Conservative	John Major (lI)
Michael Bates; MP for Langbaurgh	21 November 1996	2 May 1997	Lord Commissioner of the Treasury (17 October 1995 – 11 December 1996)	Conservative	John Major (lI)
Geoffrey Robinson; MP for Coventry North West	2 May 1997	23 December 1998		Labour	Tony Blair (I)

=== 21st century ===
Paymaster General	Term of office		Concurrent office(s)	Political party	Prime Minister
Dawn Primarolo; MP for Bristol South	4 January 1999	28 June 2007		Labour	Tony Blair (I, II, III)
Tessa Jowell; MP for Dulwich and West Norwood	28 June 2007	11 May 2010	Minister for the Olympics; Minister for the Cabinet Office (from 5 June 2009); Minister for London (until 3 October 2008; from 5 June 2009)	Labour	Gordon Brown (Brown)
Francis Maude; MP for Horsham	12 May 2010	11 May 2015	Minister for the Cabinet Office	Conservative	David Cameron (I)
Matt Hancock; MP for West Suffolk	11 May 2015	14 July 2016	Minister for the Cabinet Office	Conservative	David Cameron (II)
Ben Gummer; MP for Ipswich	14 July 2016	13 June 2017	Minister for the Cabinet Office	Conservative	Theresa May (I)
Mel Stride; MP for Central Devon	13 June 2017	23 May 2019	Financial Secretary to the Treasury	Conservative	Theresa May (II)
Jesse Norman; MP for Hereford and South Herefordshire	23 May 2019	24 July 2019	Financial Secretary to the Treasury	Conservative	Theresa May (II)
Oliver Dowden; MP for Hertsmere	24 July 2019	13 February 2020	Minister for the Cabinet Office	Conservative	Boris Johnson (I & II)
Penny Mordaunt; MP for Portsmouth North	13 February 2020	16 September 2021		Conservative	Boris Johnson (II)
Michael Ellis; MP for Northampton North	16 September 2021	6 September 2022	Minister for the Cabinet Office (from 8 February 2022)	Conservative	Boris Johnson (II)
Edward Argar; MP for Charnwood	6 September 2022	14 October 2022	Minister for the Cabinet Office	Conservative	Liz Truss (Truss)
Chris Philp; MP for Croydon South	14 October 2022	25 October 2022	Minister for the Cabinet Office	Conservative	Liz Truss (Truss)
Jeremy Quin; MP for Horsham	25 October 2022	13 November 2023	Minister for the Cabinet Office	Conservative	Rishi Sunak (Sunak)
John Glen; MP for Salisbury	13 November 2023	5 July 2024	Minister for the Cabinet Office	Conservative	Rishi Sunak (Sunak)
Nick Thomas-Symonds; MP for Torfaen	8 July 2024	20 July 2026	Minister for the Cabinet Office Minister for the Constitution and European Union Relations	Labour	Keir Starmer (Starmer)
James Murray; MP for Ealing North	21 July 2026	Incumbent	Financial Secretary to the Treasury	Labour Co-op	Andy Burnham (Burnham)

== List of shadow paymasters general ==
Shadow Paymaster general	Term of office		Party	Shadow Cabinet
Richard Ottaway	1 June 2000	1 June 2001	Conservative	Hague
Stephen O'Brien	1 June 2002	1 June 2003	Conservative	Duncan Smith
Mark Prisk	1 June 2003	1 June 2004	Conservative	Howard
Andrew Tyrie	1 June 2004	1 June 2005	Conservative	Howard
Mark Francois	10 May 2005	3 July 2007	Conservative	Howard
Mark Francois	10 May 2005	3 July 2007	Conservative	Cameron
Jack Dromey	14 May 2021	4 December 2021	Labour	Starmer
Fleur Anderson	4 December 2021	4 September 2023	Labour	Starmer
Jonathan Ashworth	4 September 2023	5 July 2024	Labour	Starmer
John Glen	8 July 2024	8 November 2024	Conservative	Sunak
Richard Holden	8 November 2024	22 July 2025	Conservative	Badenoch
Harriett Baldwin	31 August 2026	Incumbent	Conservative	Badenoch
