= Simple trust =

Simple trust may refer to:

- Simple trust, in Trust law
- Simple trust, in United States trust law
- Bare trust, in Australia
