= Pink Zone =

Pink Zone may refer to:

- Pink Zone (parking scheme), a traffic congestion plan operated in London in 1959 and 1960
- Pink Zone, a 2014 film by Indican Pictures

== See also ==
- Zona Rosa (disambiguation)
