= Allt na Lairige Dam =

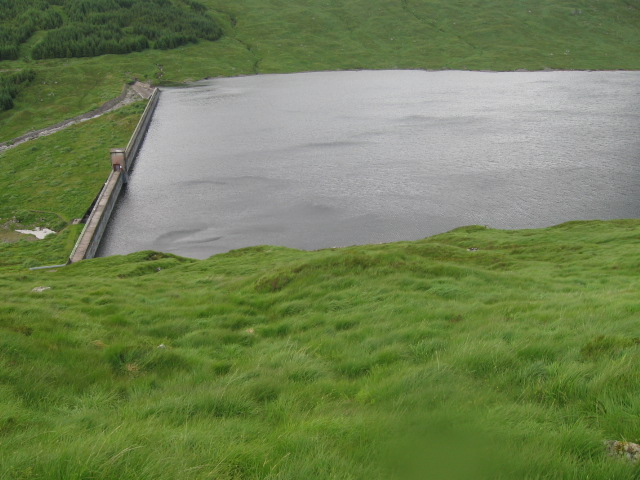
- Interactive map of Allt na Lairige Dam
- Coordinates: 56.3184°N 4.8210°W

Allt na Lairige Dam (Burn of the Pass), is a pre-stressed concrete dam in Argyll and Bute, Scotland at grid reference NN25251745. It creates an impounding reservoir which serves Allt na Lairige hydro-electric power station, which is part of the Shira Hydro-Electric Scheme, and is located on the River Fyne just before it discharges into Loch Fyne.

The dam was designed by William George Nicholson Geddes, as directed by James Arthur Banks of Babtie, Shaw and Morton of Glasgow. Construction was carried out by Marples Ridgway. It was completed in 1956 and has a height of 22 metres (72 ft). It is the only large pre-stressed concrete dam in Britain.

== See also ==
- List of reservoirs and dams in the United Kingdom

== Sources ==
- "Argyll and Bute Council Reservoirs Act 1975 Public Register"
