= Custodial account =

Financial account managed by a legal guardian for a beneficiary

A custodial account is a financial account (such as a bank account, a trust fund or a brokerage account) set up for the benefit of a beneficiary, and administered by a responsible person, known as a legal guardian or custodian, who has a fiduciary obligation to the beneficiary.

Custodial accounts come in a number of forms, one being an account set up for a minor, since the minor is under the legal age of majority. The custodian is often the minor's parent. In the U.S., this type of account is often structured as a Coverdell ESA, allowing for tax-advantaged treatment of educational expenses. Another form is a trust account owned by an individual or institution, managed by a named party for purposes of rapid distribution of funds in that account. This is commonly used for petty cash, or for transactions that have very limited and clearly defined payees and transaction types. For example, law firm accounting includes trust accounts for disbursing funds entrusted to the law firm by each client for the client's benefit.

== Minors ==
In the United States, the Uniform Transfers to Minors Act provides for the possibility of bank accounts, brokerage accounts, and other property to be held in a custodial capacity under the Act so that the custodian has the right to control the property but that legal title is deemed to be in the minor for many purposes.

== Securities custodianship ==
In the United States Brokerage account agreements under Article 8 of the Uniform Commercial Code create a legal relation known as "custodianship", which is distinguished from the traditional concept of a trust.

For example, in the context of the Individual Retirement Account (IRA), a brokerage firm distinguishes its custodial account IRAs from trust IRAs when seeking IRS tax approval for an IRA plan which is part of a brokerage account agreement. The treatment of a brokerage account based IRA as a trust for tax purposes is largely a legal fiction.

If Article 8 is set aside and the brokerage account is considered purely under principles of common law, there is a possibility of construing the collection of brokerage accounts in the intermediated custodial holding chain as a collection of directed agency nominee trusts. According to this legal theory, each securities position with respect to a particular class of securities which appears in the brokerage firm's omnibus securities account is a trust fund for the benefit of customers sharing participation in that position. To exactly what extent the operation of such a theory would be restricted by Article 8 and the Securities Investor Protection Act in future litigation is not obvious, and is perhaps irrelevant as a practical matter because of the level of detail in the legislation mentioned.

The trustee of a nominee trust, being a directed agent of the beneficiaries, cannot even bind the trust estate to a debt in a capacity that is sufficiently separate from the capacity of the beneficiaries to contract the same debt themselves. For this reason, the nominee trust is not a debtor-person for bankruptcy purposes and therefore cannot obtain bankruptcy protection as if it were a corporation. This is one reason why nominee trusts are not considered to be actual trusts by some lawyers.

In the United Kingdom, principles of common law operate with greater freedom in relation securities custody. A securities intermediary is naturally characterized as a trustee for the benefit of clients holding interests in those securities.

== See also ==
- Trust law – Three-party fiduciary relationship
- Custodian bank – Financial institution providing safekeeping and securities services
- Segregated account – Separation of client and firm securities
- Securities account – Type of financial account
