= Zona Rosa =

Zona Rosa (Spanish: "pink zone") is a term used in Latin American countries to refer to a district that is the center of a town or city's nightlife. It may refer to:

== Places ==
- Zona Rosa, Mexico City, a neighborhood in Mexico City
- Zona Rosa (San Salvador), the entertainment district of San Salvador, El Salvador
- Zona Rosa (Kansas City, Missouri), a shopping district in Kansas City, Missouri
- Zona Rosa, Bogotá, a neighborhood in the northern part of Bogotá, Colombia; see Chapinero

== Other ==
- Zona Rosa, a character in the novel Idoru by William Gibson

== See also ==
- Pink Zone (disambiguation)
