= Reginald Coates =

British engineer

- Born: 28 June 1920; New Mills, Derbyshire, England, UK
- Died: 22 November 2004 (aged 84)
- Education: University of Nottingham
- Spouse: Doris Sheila Sharrad
- Children: Two sons, one daughter
- Engineering career
- Discipline: Civil
- Institutions: Institution of Civil Engineers (president)

Professor Reginald "Rex" Charles Coates (28 June 1920 – 22 November 2004) was a British civil engineer, academic and the 114th president of the Institution of Civil Engineers.

== Early life ==
Coates was born in New Mills, Derbyshire and was educated at New Mills Grammar School, and the Herbert Strutt Grammar School in Belper. He was taken into articled pupilage, a form of apprenticeship, by Mansfield Borough Council and studied for a degree in Civil Engineering at University College Nottingham.

== Career ==
He served as an officer in the Royal Engineers during the Second World War, being commissioned as a second lieutenant on 16 August 1942, and was posted to North Africa, Sicily, Italy and Austria. In 1946 he took up a lecturing post at his alma mater, now the University of Nottingham, using the university’s facilities to undertake research for his doctorate. He retained his commission and was involved in the University Officers Training Corps detachment. In 1958 he was appointed as the head of the School of Civil Engineering, taking over from Sir Joseph Pope.

When the Faculty of Engineering moved to new premises in the 1960s Coates was heavily involved in the planning of the new buildings. Under his leadership the school became recognized as one of the leading civil engineering research establishments in the country. He later served the university as Dean of Engineering and as Vice-Chancellor.

He was elected president of the Institution of Civil Engineers in 1978 and retired from his University positions shortly afterwards. He later took up the post of Head of Civil Engineering at the Papua New Guinea University of Technology in Lae, PNG.

== Personal life ==
He married Doris Sheila Sharrad in 1942, and they had two sons and one daughter.

Coates was a victim of Alzheimer's and died in 2004. The main Faculty of Engineering building at the University of Nottingham was named after him in recognition of his contributions to the university.

Professional and academic associations
Preceded by Alan Muir Wood	President of the Institution of Civil Engineers; November 1978 – November 1979	Succeeded by William George Nicholson Geddes
