= Backwater Reservoir =

Reservoir in Angus, Scotland

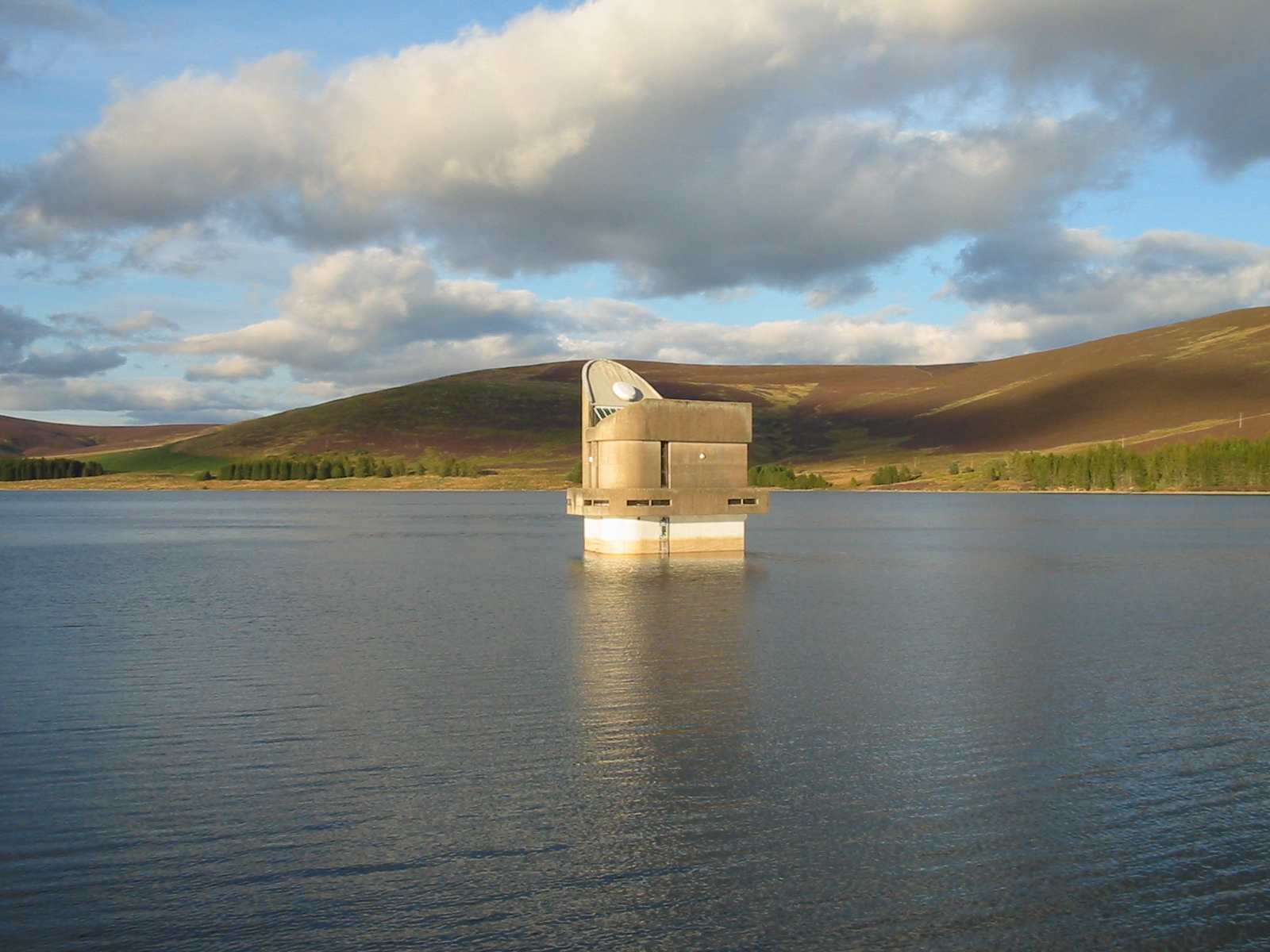
- The pumping house

- Location within Scotland
- Location: Angus, Scotland
- Coordinates: 56.715°N 3.220°W NO253591
- Type: Reservoir
- Catchment area: Lintrathen catchment
- Basin countries: United Kingdom
- Max. length: 3 kilometres (1.9 mi)
- Surface area: 158 hectares (390 acres)
- Water volume: 24,550,000 cubic metres (867,000,000 ft^{3})

Backwater Reservoir is a reservoir in north west Angus, Scotland. The reservoir's sole purpose is to provide drinking water, and as such, it supplies Angus, Dundee, and parts of Perth and Kinross. Backwater, together with the smaller Lintrathen Reservoir 4 kilometres (2.5 mi) to the south, is capable of supplying some 300,000 people with drinking water.

== History ==
The project was initiated by the Dundee Corporation Waterworks in 1964 and absorbed into the newly created East of Scotland Water Board in 1968, before final completion and the official opening by Queen Elizabeth II on 9 October 1969.

Scottish Water are the present owners and operators of the reservoir, following the amalgamation of the East of Scotland Water Authority with the West of Scotland and North of Scotland Water Authorities to form a single company. Scottish Water is owned by the Scottish Government.

== Technical ==
The dam is an embankment type, measuring 42.6 metres high by 570 metres long. The reservoir extends for 3 kilometres behind the dam and has a peak capacity of 24.55 million cubic metres (867×10^{6} ft^{3}). An unclassified road runs across the spillway and embankment before following the east bank of the reservoir. This road runs for a further 2 kilometres before coming to an end. The dam was the first in Britain to use chemical grouting to create a waterproof barrier below the embankment.

Balfour Beatty constructed the embankment and ancillary works. Soil Mechanics and Bachy Soletanche were responsible for the chemical grouting and for tunnelling work. Consulting engineer was Babtie, Shaw and Morton.

== Location ==
Backwater Reservoir is located within Glen Isla. The reservoir can be reached by taking the B951 turn-off from the A93 (around 5 miles south of Spittal of Glenshee) to the north-west, or from the A926 at Kirriemuir to the south-east. The perimeter of the reservoir forms a popular walking route.

== See also ==
- List of reservoirs and dams in the United Kingdom

== Images ==
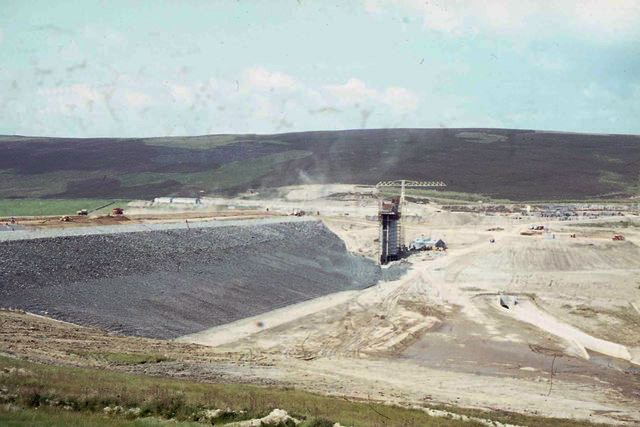
Backwater Reservoir during construction, June 1968

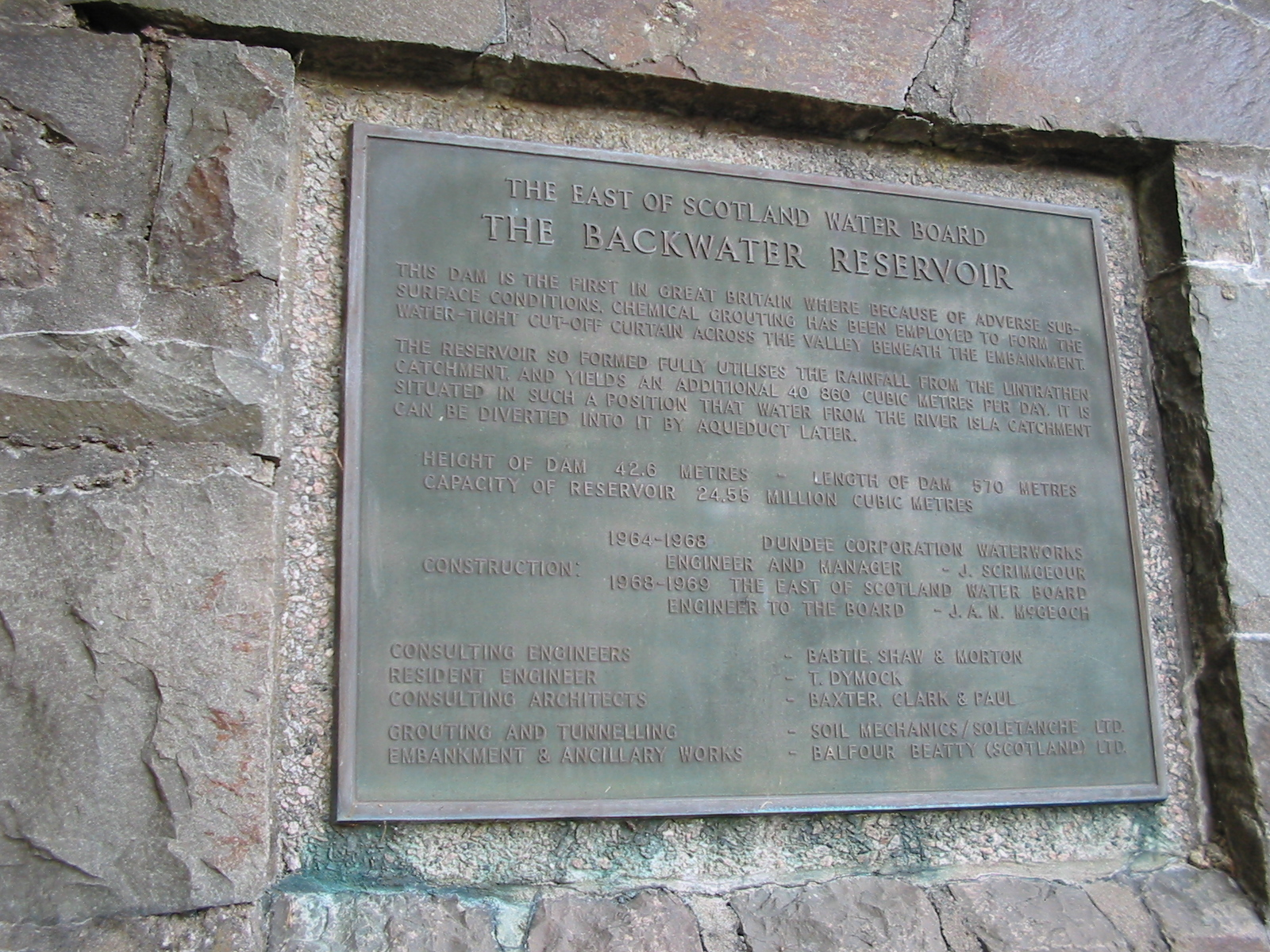
Plaque detailing the technical specifications

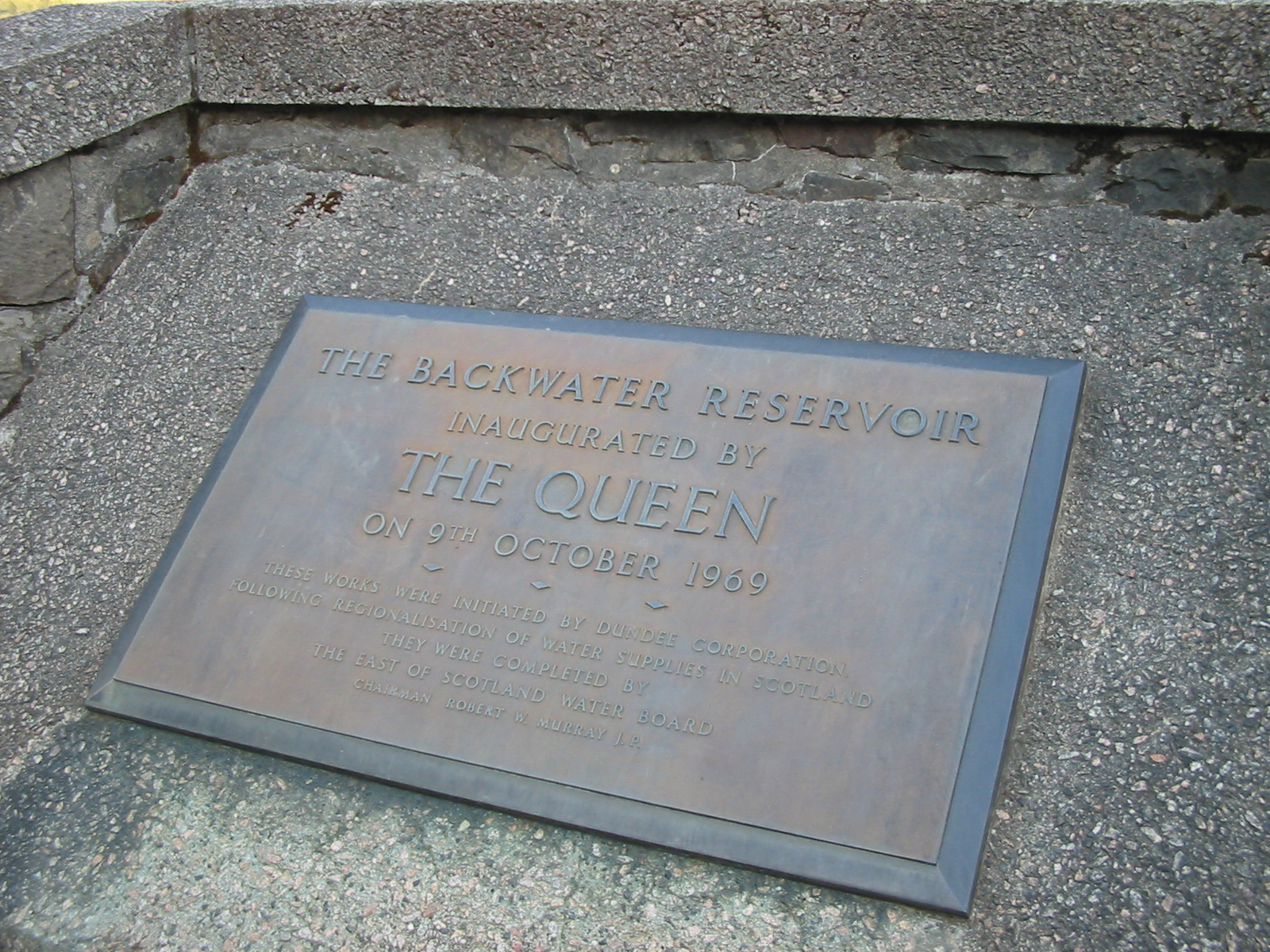
Plaque commemorating the official opening ceremony

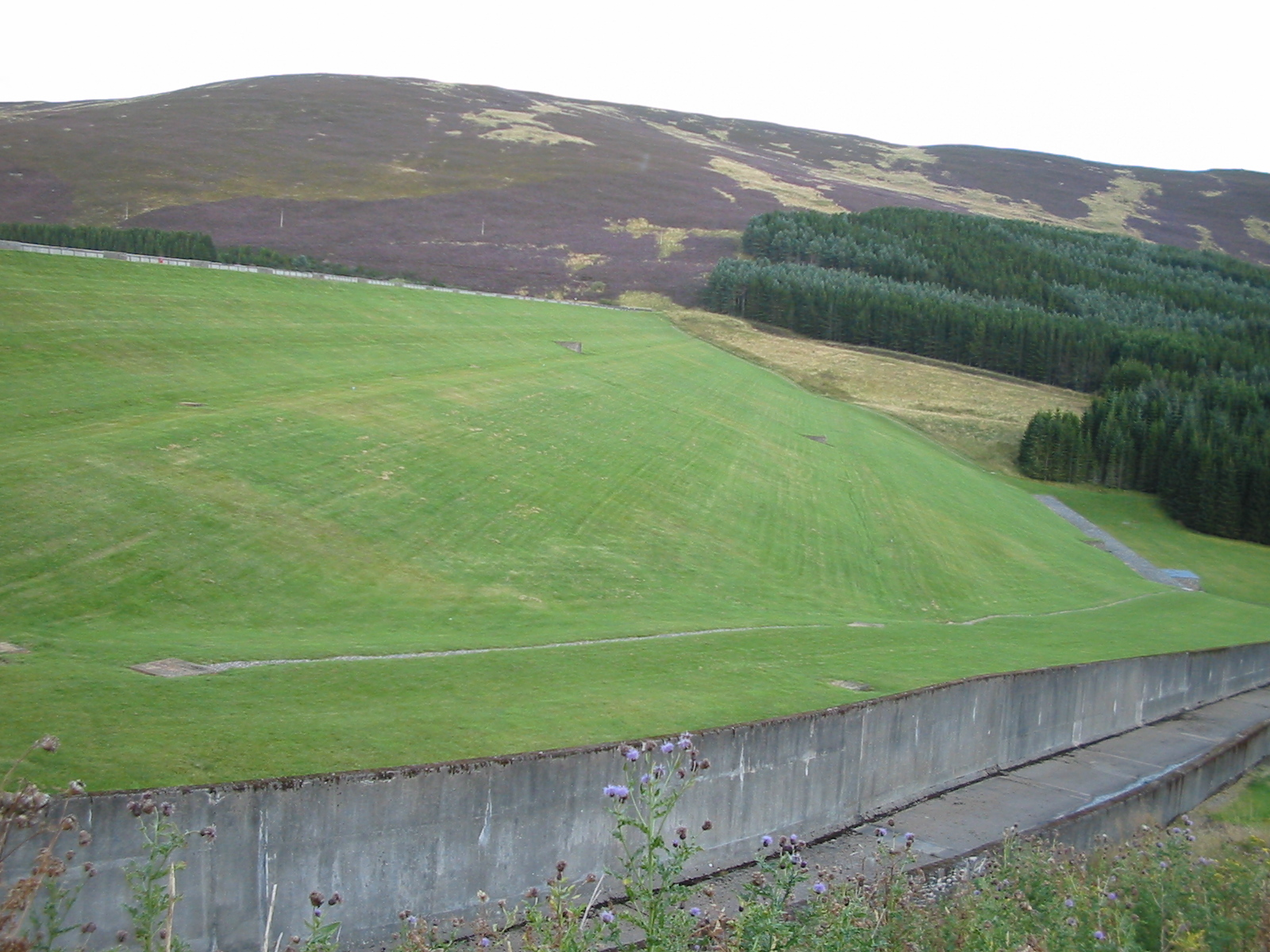
Backwater Reservoir dam with the spillway in the foreground

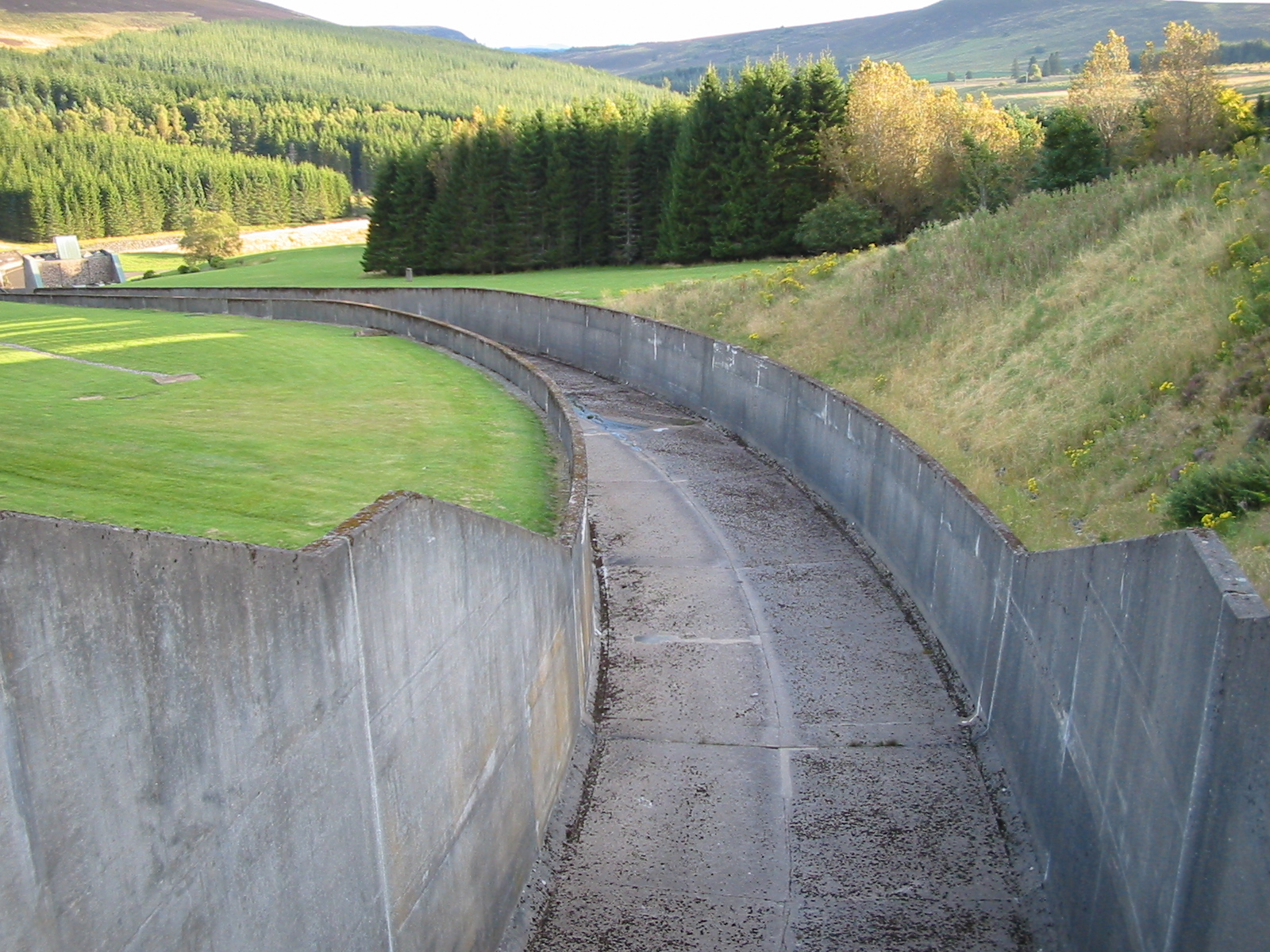
The spillway
