= Babtie, Shaw and Morton =

Firm of civil engineers based in Glasgow

Babtie, Shaw and Morton was a firm of civil engineers based in Glasgow, Scotland, and noted for its work on bridges, dams and reservoirs.

== History ==
It took its name following the 1906 merger of Babtie & Bonn (a partnership founded by John Babtie and Carl Bonn in 1897) and Shaw & Morton (founded by William Shaw and Hugh Morton).

The Babtie Group acquired consulting engineers Harris & Sutherland in 1997, then also Allott & Lomax in 2000.

The 3,500-strong Babtie Group was acquired by Jacobs Engineering Group in August 2004.

== Projects ==
Notable design projects include the Backwater Reservoir, Kielder Water, and the Harland & Wolff shipbuilding dock in Belfast.

== People ==
James Arthur Banks and William George Nicholson Geddes both became President of the Institution of Civil Engineers while partners in the firm. Gordon Masterton, a director of Babtie from 1993 became the firm's third President of the ICE in 2005, whilst a Vice President of Jacobs.
