= Brunswick Wharf Power Station =

Former coal and oil-fired power station

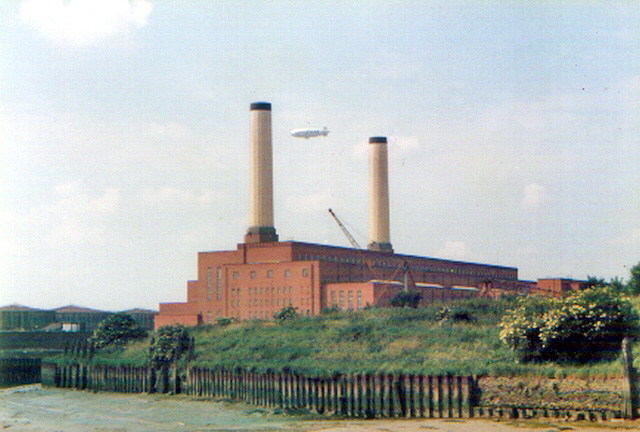
- Brunswick Wharf Power Station in 1984
- Country: England
- Location: Tower Hamlets, London
- Coordinates: 51.5081°N 0.0010°E
- Status: Decommissioned and demolished
- Construction began: 1947
- Commission date: 1952
- Decommission date: 1984
- Owners: Poplar Borough Council (1947–1948); British Electricity Authority (1948–1955); Central Electricity Authority (1955–1957); Central Electricity Generating Board (1958–1984)
- Operator: As owner

Thermal power station
- Primary fuel: Coal & oil
- Tertiary fuel: Oil
- Chimneys: Two (91 metres)
- Cooling towers: None
- Cooling source: River water

Power generation
- Units operational: Four × 55 MW & two × 63 MW turbo-alternators
- Make and model: Metropolitan-Vickers
- Units decommissioned: All
- Nameplate capacity: 340 MW
- Annual net output: (See graph below)

External links
- Commons: Related media on Commons

Brunswick Wharf Power Station (also known as Blackwall Power Station) was a coal- and oil-fired power station on the River Thames at Blackwall in London. The station was planned from 1939 by Poplar Borough Council but construction only started in 1947 after the Second World War. It was decommissioned in 1984, and the site was redeveloped.

== History ==
The station was built in stages between 1947 and 1956 on the site of the former East India Export Dock, itself originally the Brunswick Dock of the Blackwall Yard shipyard. The site was controversial due to both potential air pollution in a densely populated part of London, and to the implications of further concentrating generating capacity in an area that had been a strategic target in The Blitz.

The building was a monumental brick structure with fluted concrete chimneys, similar to Gilbert Scott's design for Battersea Power Station. Its main building contractor was Peter Lind & Company with Redpath Brown & Company supplying the steelwork, Tileman and Company building the reinforced concrete chimneys and Marples, Ridgeway and Partners being the main civil engineering contractors. Metropolitan-Vickers supplied the six turbo-alternators and Clarke, Chapman & Company and John Brown & Company supplied the 11 boilers. A new 855 feet (261 m) concrete wharf with three Stothert & Pitt luffing cranes was built to land coal brought by colliers.

The first phase of the station was supposed to be commissioned in 1948 but in fact did not start supplying electricity until April 1952. The station was officially opened by British Electricity Authority (BEA) chairman Walter Citrine, 1st Baron Citrine in 1954 but was not completed until 1956. In 1957 the alternators were uprated to produce a total of 118 MW. The final configuration of the station was 4 x 55 MW generators and 2 x 60 MW hydrogen cooled Metropolitan-Vickers generators. Eleven boilers were installed manufactured by Clarke, Chapman & Co. and by John Brown & Co. The maximum steam capacity of the boilers was 3,520,000 lb/hr (443 kg/s). Steam pressure and temperature at the turbine stop valves was 900 psi (62 bar) and 482 °C.

In 1958 Brunswick Wharf was used in an experiment – Operation Chimney Plume – by the CEGB to determine whether power station flue-gas plumes penetrated fog layers. On 4 December 1958 an aircraft flew above the low lying fog (750–800 feet) over London. Chemical were added to the power station boilers to colour the flue-gas plumes. It was found that the hot flue-gas plumes rose through and clear of the fog layer, whereas the 'washed' and therefore cooler plumes from Battersea power station and Bankside power station were subsumed within the fog layer.

The station was originally coal-fired, but the BEA's successor, the Central Electricity Generating Board, had it converted to oil in 1970–71. The conversion to oil included the first solid state furnace controls in the UK, installed by Associated British Combustion, of Portchester UK. Associated British Combustion was subsequently in financial trouble and was acquired by Combustion Engineering of USA.

=== Electricity output ===
Electricity output from Brunswick Wharf power station over the period 1954-1984 was as follows.

Brunswick Wharf annual electricity output GWh

=== Closure ===
The CEGB planned to enlarge the station, but the 1973 oil crisis increased the price of oil, and the CEGB found it had surplus generating capacity. The CEGB therefore decommissioned the station in 1984 and sold it in 1987. The power station was demolished in 1988–89, with the exception of the switchgear house, which survived until the 1990s but was later redeveloped. Three blocks called Elektron Towers and a block called Switch House have been built on the site of the power station. The current site also contains the Brunswick Wharf Substation.
