= Viscount Mills =

Viscountcy in the Peerage of the United Kingdom

Viscount Mills, of Kensington in the County of London, is a title in the Peerage of the United Kingdom. It was created on 22 August 1962 for the Conservative politician Percy Mills, 1st Baron Mills. He had already been created a Baronet, of Alcester in the County of Warwick, in the Baronetage of the United Kingdom on 1 July 1953, and as Baron Mills, of Studley in the County of Warwick, on 22 January 1957, also in the Peerage of the United Kingdom. As of 2017 the titles are held by his grandson, the third Viscount, who succeeded his father in 1988.

== Viscounts Mills (1962) ==
- Percy Herbert Mills, 1st Viscount Mills (1890–1968)
- Roger Clinton Mills, 2nd Viscount Mills (1919–1988)
- Christopher Philip Roger Mills, 3rd Viscount Mills (b. 1956)

There is no heir to the peerages or the baronetcy.

== Arms ==
Coat of arms of Viscount Mills
| Coronet A Coronet of a Viscount Crest A Bear's Gamb erased Or supporting a Flint-lock proper Escutcheon Per chevron Azure and Argent in chief two Millrinds of the last and in base a Balance Sable Supporters On either side a Lion Or collared and chained Azure pendant from the Collar an Escutcheon of the last charged with a Sun in Splendour Gold Motto Balance and Control |
