= Bare trust =

Trust in which the beneficiary, if of legal age, can claim the assets at any time

In trust law, a bare trust is a trust in which the beneficiary has a right to both income and capital and may call for both to be remitted into their own name.

== In England and Wales ==
Assets in a bare trust are held in the name of a trustee, but the beneficiary has the right to all of the capital and income of the trust at any time if they are 18 or over (in England and Wales), or 16 or over (in Scotland). Bare trusts are often used to pass assets to young people - the trustees look after them until the beneficiary is old enough.

== In Australia ==
Recent amendments to the Superannuation Industry (Supervision) Act 1993 allow superannuation funds to invest in any kind of asset and to borrow, charging those assets so long as there is no recourse for the borrowing against the superannuation fund. New section 67A & 67B provides that a fund can borrow money if:

1. the borrowed monies are used to acquire an asset which the fund is not otherwise prohibited from acquiring
2. the asset acquired (or a replacement asset) is held on trust (the holding trust) so the fund receives a beneficial interest in the asset
3. the SMSF has the right to acquire legal ownership of the asset (or, if applicable, the replacement asset) by making one or more payments after acquiring the beneficial interest
4. any recourse the lender has under the arrangement against the SMSF trustee is limited to rights relating to the asset acquired (or, if applicable, the replacement asset). For example, the lender can have the right to recover outstanding amounts where there is a default on the borrowing by repossessing or disposing of the asset being acquired under the arrangement, but cannot have the right to recover such amounts through recourse to the fund's other assets.

The Bare Trust Deed is a key document. Care is required to ensure there are no adverse GST, taxation or stamp duty consequences. The legal and beneficial interests in the property must be separated, so that an entity separate from the Superannuation Fund Trustee holds the legal title, while the Superannuation Fund Trustee holds the beneficial interest.

A case that deals with the limited powers of a bare trustee to deal with trust assets is Caterpillar Financial Australia Ltd v Ovens Nominees Pty Ltd, which considered the law relating to the duties, powers and rights of a bare trustee in a winding up. This case is an important reminder to practitioners of some of the difficulties that can arise where an insolvent company owns property as a corporate trustee. Care should be taken to carefully review the trust deed on appointment to ensure the trustee retains its powers to sell trust assets.

== See also ==
- Nominee trust
- Nominee account
