= Percy Mills, 1st Viscount Mills =

English industrialist and politician (1890–1968)

Percy Herbert Mills, 1st Viscount Mills, KBE, PC (4 January 1890 – 10 September 1968), known as Sir Percy Mills, Bt, between 1953 and 1957 and as The Lord Mills between 1957 and 1962, was a British industrialist, public servant and politician.

== Background and education ==
Mills was born at Thornaby and educated at Barnard Castle School.

== Career ==
During the Second World War Mills served as Controller-General of Machine Tools at the Ministry of Supply from 1940 to 1944. He earned Harold Macmillan's absolute confidence and was described by the Oxford Dictionary of National Biography as "one of the most politically influential industrialists of his time." He was knighted in the 1942 New Year Honours, and was appointed to the Order of the British Empire as a Knight Commander (KBE) in the 1946 Birthday Honours. He was created as a Baronet, of Alcester in the County of Warwick, in 1952 and was raised to the peerage as Baron Mills, of Studley in the County of Warwick, in January 1957. The same month newly appointed Prime Minister Macmillan made Mills Minister of Power, with a seat in the cabinet. He was sworn of the Privy Council at the same time. In October 1959 he became Paymaster General, which he remained until October 1961, when he was made Minister without Portfolio. Following his departure from the Cabinet after the "Night of the Long Knives" he was made Viscount Mills, of Kensington in the County of London, in 1962.

== Personal life ==
Lord Mills died in September 1968, aged 78, and was succeeded in the viscountcy by his son, Roger.

Political offices
Preceded by Aubrey Jones (Minister of Fuel and Power)	Minister of Power; 1957–1958	Succeeded by Richard Wood
Preceded by Reginald Maudling	Paymaster General; 1959–1961	Succeeded by Henry Brooke
Preceded by –	Minister without Portfolio; 1961–1962	Succeeded by –
Peerage of the United Kingdom
New creation	Viscount Mills; 1962–1968	Succeeded by Roger Clinton Mills
New creation	Baron Mills; 1957–1968	Succeeded by Roger Clinton Mills
Baronetage of the United Kingdom
New creation	Baronet (of Alcester); 1953–1968	Succeeded by Roger Clinton Mills
