= Marples Ridgway =

Marples Ridgway was a British civil engineering company founded in 1948 by engineer Reginald Ridgway and accountant Ernest Marples. Marples served as the British Minister of Transport between 1959 and 1964. In 1964, the company was taken over by the Bath and Portland Group.

During Marples's tenure as Minister of Transport, he was accused of self-dealing and conflict of interest. This included the awarding of public sector construction projects such as the Hammersmith and Chiswick flyovers, and various motorway, dam and power station projects, to Marples Ridgway.

The company was also awarded major civil engineering projects outside the UK (e.g. Port Esquival in Jamaica, road networks in Ethiopia).

Projects completed:

- Brunswick Wharf Power Station (1956)
- Allt na Lairige Dam (1956)
- Chiswick flyover (1959)
- Hammersmith flyover (1961)
- Skelton Grange Power Station
- Port Esquivel shipping terminal, Jamaica
- Bromford Viaduct
- A329(M) motorway
- M56 motorway
- M27 motorway
