= Pink Zone (parking scheme) =

Parking scheme in London 1959–1960

The Pink Zone was a parking scheme operated in London, England, over the Christmas period of 1959 and 1960. It was intended to provide free parking places for motorists to help with the increase in traffic over Christmas.

Nineteen car parks were set up for use in December 1959 throughout London. The intention was for motorists to park in these car parks, and use public transport to get to central London, to reduce congestion. London Transport increased their train services during the Christmas period as part of the plan. Only the four car parks in the Royal Parks and the one on Horse Guards Parade were heavily used.

== Sources ==
- Charlesworth, G. (May 1960). "Roads and Traffic Research: Benefits Gained From Traffic Engineering Research". Traffic Engineering & Control. 2 (1): 40–42.
- "Mr. Marples's Attack on Traffic Chaos". The Guardian. 27 November 1959. p. 1.
- Laybourn, Keith; Taylor, David (2015). The Battle for the Roads of Britain. Basingstoke, Hampshire: Palgrave Macmillan. ISBN 978-1-349-57413-1.
