= Nominee trust =

Type of legal arrangement

A nominee trust or nominee company is a legal arrangement whereby a person, termed the settlor, appoints another person, termed the "nominee" or "trustee", to be the owner of the legal title to some property. Although the legal title is transferred to the nominee, the beneficial ownership of the property is transferred to a third person, termed the beneficiary.

== Characteristics ==
The arrangement is simple and passive: generally, the nominee is not required to do anything except carry out specific (lawful) actions if so directed by the beneficiaries. For example, in England and Wales, the Official Custodian for Charities, which acts as nominee for numerous charities, can only buy and sell assets on behalf of charities if instructed to do so.

A nominee trust is an example of a bare trust: this is a simple type of trust where the trustee acts as the legal owner of some property but is under no obligation to manage the trust fund other than as directed by the beneficiary, and where there are no restrictions beneficiary's right to use the property. A nominee trust is also an example of an agency arrangement, whereby the beneficiary acts as principal, and the nominee acts as agent. This agency relationship means the nominee has limited, or no, discretion as to how the trust property is managed.

In the event a nominee becomes insolvent, the beneficiary should not be affected as the nominee's creditors cannot take possession of the trust assets. For bankruptcy purposes, the directed agency feature of a nominee trust prevents the trust itself from being a debtor-person. Therefore, a nominee trust cannot declare bankruptcy.

Nominee trust law has been adopted around the world, but the rules differ by jurisdiction as a result of historical and cultural factors. For example, China has a very recently adopted nominee shareholder law but in the context of a society where escaping liability from indebtedness is unacceptable. Therefore, the Supreme People’s Court of China rules provides a general principle for interpreting nominee shareholding contracts: the nominee shareholder is bound except where in violation of the law; beneficial ownership is governed by the general principles of contract law, and creditors can bypass the corporate veil to pursue liability against a nominee shareholder. The Supreme Court reasoned that the purpose of veil-piercing laws is to balance creditor interests in collection against corporate investor interests in limited liability.

== Uses ==
=== Avoidance of disclosure of ownership ===
- Nominee trusts can be used to avoid reporting the ownership of real estate on the public record. The deed, or other filed document, lists the trustee but not the undisclosed principals.
- Nominee trusts can be used to avoid shares being registered in the names of the beneficiaries.

=== Facilitation of transfer of property ===
- Nominee trusts can be used in order to the transfer of real property without involving the county recorder.
- In England and Wales, the legal title to land may only be owned by persons aged 18 or over. Someone wishing to transfer land to someone aged under 18 may appoint a nominee to act as the legal owner, with the person aged under 18 becoming the equitable beneficial owner. Although there is a restriction on persons under 18 owning the legal title to land, they may nonetheless take ownership of the equitable beneficial interest under a trust.

=== Reduction of administrative burden ===
- Stockbrokers often appoint company to act as a nominee shareholder to reduce the administrative burden of trading on behalf of their clients.
- In England and Wales, trustees of charitable trusts may appoint a nominee to avoid the need to change the legal owner of trust property if the charity's trustees change.
- Nominee trusts can be used to reduce the number of parties required to validity execute documents relating to securities.

=== Reduction of costs ===
- Institutional investors often appoint a nominee company owned by an investment bank to act as nominee in respect of their shareholdings due to the economies of scale offered.

=== Governmental use ===
- In the majority of England, the Treasury Solicitor acts as the Crown's nominee for the collection of bona vacantia (Latin for "ownerless goods").

== See also ==
- Bare trust
- Totten trust
