= James Arthur Banks =

Scottish civil engineer

- Born: 1897; Glasgow
- Died: 1 December 1967 (aged 70)
- Engineering career
- Discipline: Civil
- Institutions: Institution of Civil Engineers (president), Royal Society of Edinburgh (Fellow)

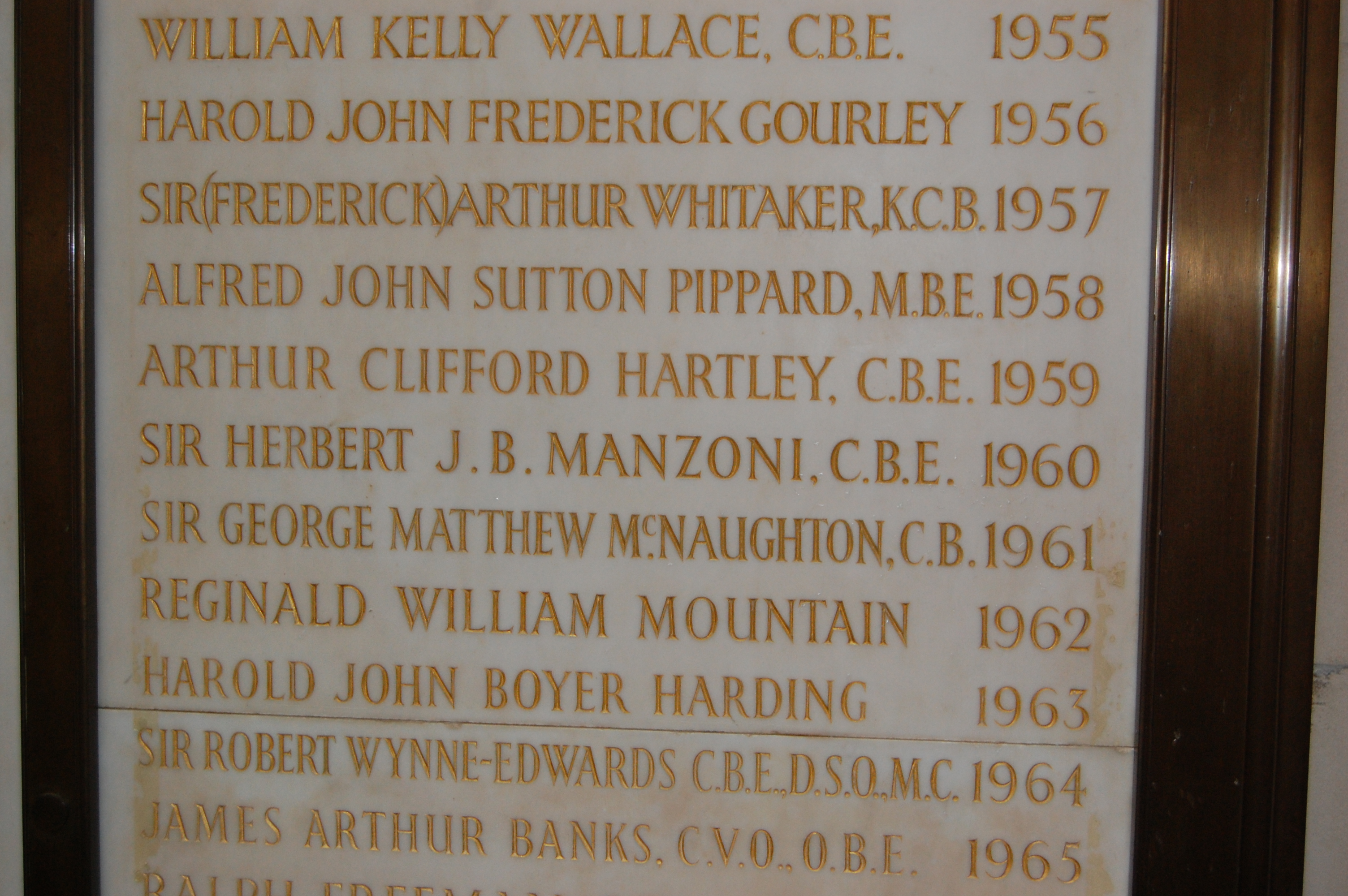
Banks' name on the list of Institution of Civil Engineers presidents, at their One Great George Street headquarters

James Arthur Banks CVO OBE FRSE (1897 – 1 December 1967) was a Scottish civil engineer.

Banks was born in Glasgow in 1897. He attended Woodside Higher Grade School in Glasgow. During World War I he served in the Royal Marine Engineers, from 1914 to 1918.

He initially trained as a structural engineer and then joined Babtie, Shaw and Morton in 1921 to train as a civil engineer. He worked in England and the US and returned to Babtie, Shaw and Morton in 1929. His speciality was the design and construction of dams for water supply and power generation, commencing with Afton Reservoir. He became a partner of the firm in 1931 and was senior partner from 1940 to 1966.

He was appointed a Member of the Order of the British Empire in 1944. He was appointed an officer of the same order in the New Year Honours of 1947 and a Commander of the Royal Victorian Order on 31 May 1963. From 1961 Banks was chairman of the International Commission on Large Dams and was Consulting Engineer to Queen Elizabeth II for the Balmoral Estate and a member of the Court of the University of Strathclyde. He served as president of the Institution of Civil Engineers from November 1965 to November 1966 and was elected a Fellow of the Royal Society of Edinburgh on 6 March 1967.

He died on 1 December 1967.

Professional and academic associations
Preceded by Robert Wynne-Edwards	President of the Institution of Civil Engineers; November 1965 – November 1966	Succeeded by Ralph Freeman
