= Malcolm Robertson (diplomat) =

British diplomat & politician (1877-1951)

The Right Honourable Sir Malcolm Robertson GCMG KBE
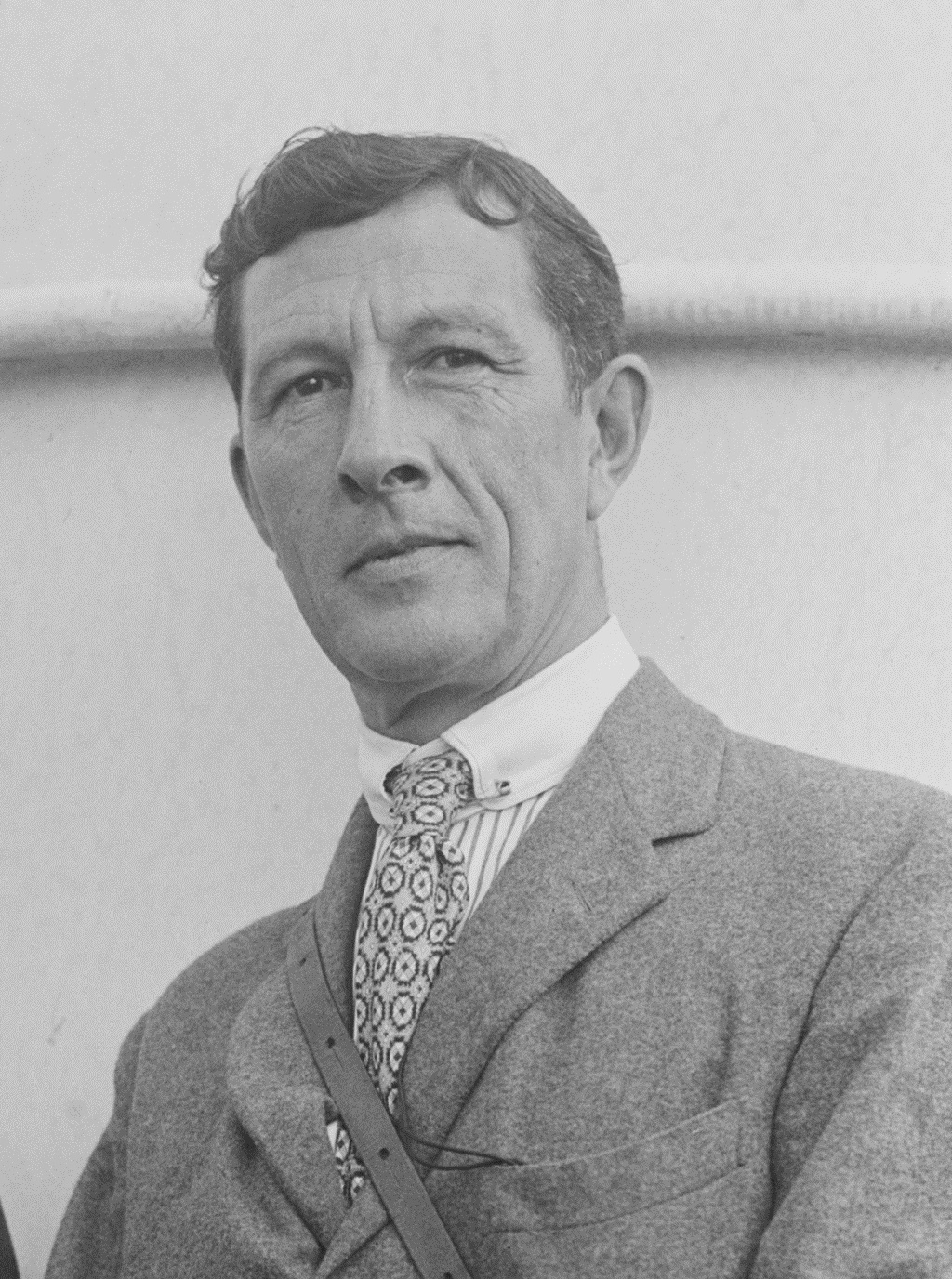

United Kingdom Ambassador to Argentina
- In office 1925–1929
- Preceded by: Beilby Alston
- Succeeded by: Ronald Macleay

Member of Parliament for Mitcham
- In office 19 August 1940 – 5 July 1945
- Preceded by: Richard James Meller
- Succeeded by: Tom Braddock

Personal details
- Born: 2 September 1877
- Died: 23 April 1951 (aged 73)
- Party: Conservative
- Spouse: Gladys Ingalls
- Children: Major Donald Struan Robertson (son)
- Occupation: Diplomat, politician, businessman

Sir Malcolm Arnold Robertson GCMG KBE PC (2 September 1877 – 23 April 1951) was a British diplomat and politician. He was appointed Minister Plenipotentiary in Argentina in 1925, and became Ambassador to Argentina from 1927 to 1929.

== Biography ==
Robertson entered the Civil Service after passing competitive examinations in December 1898, being appointed a clerk on the establishment of Her Majesty's Diplomatic Service on 3 January 1899. He rose steadily through the ranks, being appointed Acting Third Secretary on 1 January 1903, Second Secretary on 23 November 1905, and First Secretary on 23 November 1912. Robertson served as chargé d'affaires at Rio de Janeiro, and on 3 June 1915 was appointed a Companion of the Order of St. Michael and St. George.

In 1917 he was first secretary of the British Embassy in Washington, D.C., where in March his engagement to Gladys Ingalls, daughter of railroad magnate Melville E. Ingalls, was announced. Their only child, Donald Struan Robertson, served in the Scots Guards, rising to the rank of major.

On 15 September 1919 Robertson was appointed a Counsellor of Embassy in the Diplomatic Service, and on 1 December 1921 he was appointed Agent and Consul-General at Tangier, where he took a leading part in negotiating the Tangier Protocol. In the 1924 Birthday Honours Robertson, now Minister at Tangier, was made a Knight Commander of the Order of the British Empire. On 18 September 1925 he was appointed Envoy Extraordinary and Minister Plenipotentiary to the Argentine Republic, and also Minister Plenipotentiary to the Republic of Paraguay. On 26 May 1927 he became a Privy Councillor, and on 9 July 1927 was appointed Ambassador Extraordinary and Plenipotentiary to the Argentine Republic.

After retiring from the Diplomatic Service in 1930, he became Chairman of Spillers from 1930 to 1947. He was elected as Conservative MP for Mitcham in the by-election of August 1940, but lost his seat in the 1945 general election. Robertson also served as Chairman of the British Council from 1941 to 1945. In that capacity, in 1942 Robertson and R. A. Butler, President of the Board of Education, invited the ministers of education of the Allied countries to form a Conference of Allied Ministers of Education, which after the war was expanded and became the United Nations Educational, Scientific and Cultural Organization (UNESCO).

Diplomatic posts
Preceded by Beilby Alston	British Ambassador to Argentina; 1925–1929	Succeeded by Ronald Macleay
Parliament of the United Kingdom
Preceded by Richard Meller	Member of Parliament for Mitcham; 1940 – 1945	Succeeded by Tom Braddock
