= Beilby Alston =

British diplomat

The Right Honourable Sir Beilby Alston GBE KCMG CB
- Alston in 1920.

HM Ambassador to Brazil
- In office 1925–1929

HM Envoy Extraordinary and Minister Plenipotentiary to Argentina
- In office 1923–1925

HM Envoy Extraordinary and Minister Plenipotentiary to the Republic of China
- In office 1920–1922

Personal details
- Born: Beilby Francis Alston; 8 October 1868
- Died: 28 June 1929 (aged 60)

Sir Beilby Francis Alston (8 October 1868 – 28 June 1929) was a British diplomat who was envoy to various countries.

== Career ==
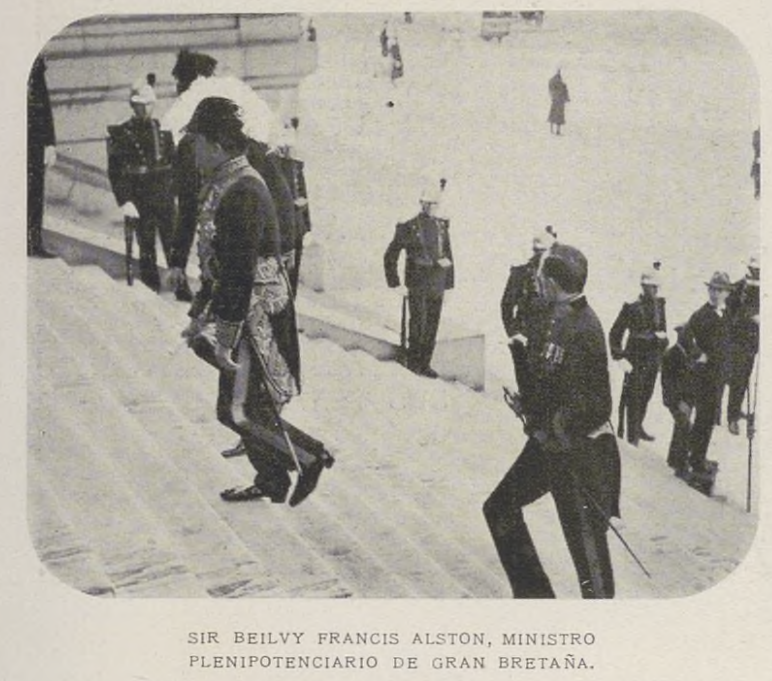
Beilby Francis Alston in Argentina in 1925

Beilby Francis Alston was the son of a civil servant at the Foreign Office (not a diplomat), Sir Francis Alston KCMG. Beilby Alston started as a clerk in the Librarian's Department of the Foreign Office in 1890 and later that year in the Political Division. In 1895 he was posted to Copenhagen as acting 3rd Secretary in the Diplomatic Service. He was Secretary to the British Plenipotentiaries at a conference in Paris in 1896 to revise the Berne Convention, then acting 2nd Secretary and chargé d'affaires at Buenos Aires 1896–97. He was Secretary to British representatives at conferences at Brussels in 1898, 1901, and 1902, leading to the Brussels Sugar Convention of 5 March 1902. Returning to London, Alston was attached to Prince Tsai Suun of China on his mission to England in 1909, and to Prince Tsai-Chen who represented the Emperor of China at the coronation of King George V in June 1911. In December 1911 he was with Prince Alexander of Teck who represented the King at the coronation of King Rama VI of Siam (Thailand), moving on to Peking where he was Counsellor of the Legation 1911–17, and chargé d'affaires in 1913 and 1916–17 when the Minister, Sir John Jordan, was absent. Alston was Deputy High Commissioner in Siberia 1918–19 (during the Siberian Intervention), then Minister Plenipotentiary in Tokyo 1919–20 (under the Ambassador, Sir Charles Eliot), then Envoy Extraordinary and Minister Plenipotentiary to China 1920–22, then Minister to Argentina and to Paraguay 1923–25, then Ambassador to Brazil from 1925 until his death.

In 1932 Alston's daughter Lucy Evelyn Alston married Kenneth Benda, a company director who later became an actor.

== Honours ==
Beilby Alston was appointed CB in the King's Birthday Honours of 1913 and knighted KCMG in the Birthday Honours of 1920 and GBE in the Birthday Honours of 1929. He was made a Privy Counsellor in 1925. The Emperor of China gave him the Grand Cross of the Order of the Double Dragon in 1909, and the King of Siam made him a Commander of the Order of the White Elephant in 1911.

Diplomatic posts
Preceded by Sir John Jordan	Envoy Extraordinary and Minister Plenipotentiary to the Republic of China; 1920–1922	Succeeded by Sir Ronald Macleay
Preceded by Ronald Macleay	Envoy Extraordinary and Minister Plenipotentiary to the Argentine Republic, and Minister Plenipotentiary to the Republic of Paraguay; 1923–1925	Succeeded by Sir Malcolm Robertson
Preceded by Sir John Tilley	Ambassador Extraordinary and Plenipotentiary to the United States of Brazil; 1925–1929	Succeeded by Sir William Seeds
