= Rise of Neville Chamberlain =

The Right Honourable Neville Chamberlain FRS
- Chamberlain in 1921
- Born: Arthur Neville Chamberlain; 18 March 1869; Edgbaston, Birmingham, England
- Died: 9 November 1940 (aged 71); Heckfield, Hampshire, England
- Resting place: Westminster Abbey
- Education: Mason College
- Occupations: Businessman; politician
- Political party: Conservative
- Spouse: Anne de Vere Cole (m. 1911)
- Children: 2
- Father: Joseph Chamberlain

Member of Parliament for Birmingham Edgbaston
- In office 30 May 1929 – 9 November 1940
- Preceded by: Sir Francis Lowe
- Succeeded by: Sir Peter Bennett

Member of Parliament for Birmingham Ladywood
- In office 14 December 1918 – 30 May 1929
- Preceded by: Constituency created
- Succeeded by: Wilfrid Whiteley
Political offices
Prime Minister of the United Kingdom
In office 28 May 1937 – 10 May 1940
Monarch	George VI
Preceded by	Stanley Baldwin
Succeeded by	Winston Churchill
Leader of the Conservative Party
In office 27 May 1937 – 9 October 1940
Preceded by	Stanley Baldwin
Succeeded by	Winston Churchill
Chairman of the Conservative Party
In office 1930–1931
Preceded by	J. C. C. Davidson
Succeeded by	The Lord Stonehaven
Chancellor of the Exchequer
In office 5 November 1931 – 28 May 1937
Prime Minister	Ramsay MacDonald; Stanley Baldwin
Preceded by	Philip Snowden
Succeeded by	Sir John Simon
In office 27 August 1923 – 22 January 1924
Prime Minister	Stanley Baldwin
Preceded by	Stanley Baldwin
Succeeded by	Philip Snowden
Minister of Health
In office 25 August 1931 – 5 November 1931
Prime Minister	Ramsay MacDonald
Preceded by	Arthur Greenwood
Succeeded by	Hilton Young
In office 6 November 1924 – 4 June 1929
Prime Minister	Stanley Baldwin
Preceded by	John Wheatley
Succeeded by	Arthur Greenwood
In office 7 March 1923 – 27 August 1923
Prime Minister	Bonar Law; Stanley Baldwin
Preceded by	Sir Arthur Griffith-Boscawen
Succeeded by	William Joynson-Hicks
Paymaster General
In office 5 February 1923 – 7 March 1923
Prime Minister	Bonar Law
Preceded by	Tudor Walters
Succeeded by	William Joynson-Hicks
Postmaster General
In office 31 October 1922 – 5 February 1923
Prime Minister	Bonar Law
Preceded by	Frederick Kellaway
Succeeded by	William Joynson-Hicks

The early life, business career and political rise of Neville Chamberlain culminated on 28 May 1937, when he was summoned to Buckingham Palace to "kiss hands" and accept the office of Prime Minister of the United Kingdom. Chamberlain had long been regarded as Prime Minister Stanley Baldwin's political heir, and when Baldwin announced his retirement, Chamberlain was seen as the only possible successor.

Chamberlain was born in 1869; his father was the politician and future Cabinet minister, Joseph Chamberlain. He was educated at Rugby School and Mason College (now Birmingham University); at neither institution was he particularly successful. After a period in a firm of chartered accountants, the younger Chamberlain spent six years in the Bahamas managing a sisal plantation in a failed attempt to recoup the family fortunes.

After returning to England in 1897, Chamberlain became a successful businessman in his home city of Birmingham. He was interested in social affairs, and successfully stood for Birmingham City Council in 1911. He became Lord Mayor of Birmingham in 1915. His second term was interrupted in December 1916 when Prime Minister David Lloyd George asked him to become Director of National Service. Chamberlain received little support from Lloyd George in the post, and his eight-month tenure sparked a hatred between the two which lasted Chamberlain's lifetime.

In 1918, Chamberlain was elected to the House of Commons, at age 49 the oldest man at that time to enter Parliament and later become prime minister. After four years on the backbenches, Chamberlain saw rapid promotion, briefly becoming Chancellor of the Exchequer after less than a year as a minister. Chamberlain subsequently spent five years as Minister of Health, securing the passage of many reforming acts. After two years in opposition, Chamberlain became part of Ramsay MacDonald's National Government, and spent five and a half years as chancellor, directing Britain's financial policies as the nation emerged from the Depression. When Baldwin (who had replaced MacDonald as prime minister in 1935) retired in 1937, Chamberlain succeeded him.

== Early life ==
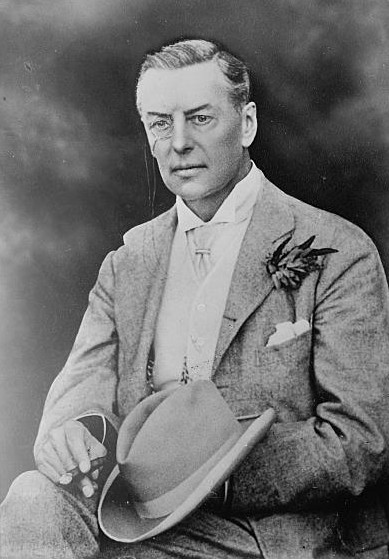
Joseph Chamberlain, father of Neville

Chamberlain was born in a house called Southbourne, in the Edgbaston district of Birmingham, England, as the only son of the second marriage of Joseph Chamberlain, who later became Mayor of Birmingham, and who also served as a Cabinet minister. Joseph Chamberlain had fathered two children by his first marriage, Beatrice and Austen. Joseph's first wife, Harriet, died giving birth to Austen; Neville's mother, the former Florence Kenrick, also died in childbirth in 1875, when Neville was six years old. Florence Chamberlain left three daughters, Ida, Hilda, and Ethel, in addition to Neville and her stepchildren. Joseph Chamberlain, in the midst of a highly successful parliamentary career, was often away, leaving the household in the hands of his sister. Young Neville was sent away to school at age eight.

Chamberlain attended Rugby School. Unhappy during his school years, he made no lasting friendships there. Although he did reasonably well in his classes, he was not outstanding academically or athletically, and his father withdrew him from the school four months short of his eighteenth birthday. In later years, as Chamberlain rose to the heights of British politics, he seldom visited the school, did not enroll his own son, and rarely spoke of his time there. Joseph Chamberlain then sent Neville to Mason College (which later developed into the University of Birmingham), which both emphasised the politician's connection to Birmingham and catered to the interest in science which Neville had shown at Rugby. Neville Chamberlain studied metallurgy and engineering for two years, but had little interest in the subjects. In 1889 his father apprenticed him to a firm of accountants. Within six months, he became a salaried employee.

== Businessman (1890–1911) ==
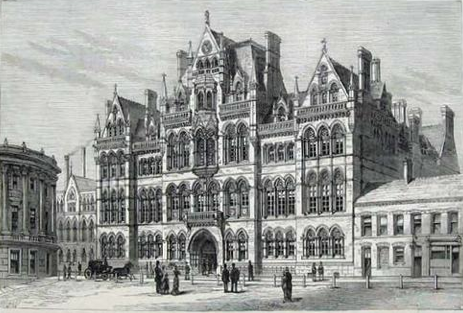
Mason College, now the University of Birmingham

Joseph Chamberlain had difficulty living within his means, a problem exacerbated by investment losses in the late 1880s. In 1890, Sir Ambrose Shea, Governor of the Bahamas, advised him that growing sisal in the Bahamas could restore the family fortunes. Joseph Chamberlain sent his two sons to the Bahamas to investigate in November 1890, and they recommended the venture. Neville Chamberlain was assigned to manage the undertaking, and in early 1891, the 22-year-old took out a lease on 26,000 acres (110 km^{2}) on the island of Andros. He spent most of the next six years on Andros. The soil proved to be unsuitable for growing sisal, and the venture failed. Joseph Chamberlain lost £50,000 (approximately £4.2 million today). Neville Chamberlain returned to Britain in early 1897.

Neville Chamberlain resided in his father's Birmingham house, Highbury, a large part of which was shut up to save on expenses. His father and half-brother spent much of their time in London, where they were serving in the Lord Salisbury Government. Through a family connection, Neville Chamberlain was made a director of Elliot's Metal Company, which was located within a mile (1.6 km) of Highbury. Chamberlain took a hands-on approach, exploring all aspects of the business. In November 1897, he purchased (with assistance from his family) Hoskins & Company, a manufacturer of metal ship berths. Chamberlain served as managing director of Hoskins for 17 years, during which time the company prospered. Chamberlain introduced a profit-sharing scheme at Hoskins which he credited with ensuring industrial peace, and opened a medical clinic for the workers. His business acumen raised him in the eyes of his father, who told a friend that of his two sons, "Neville is really the clever one" and but for his lack of interest in politics, "I would back him to be Prime Minister".

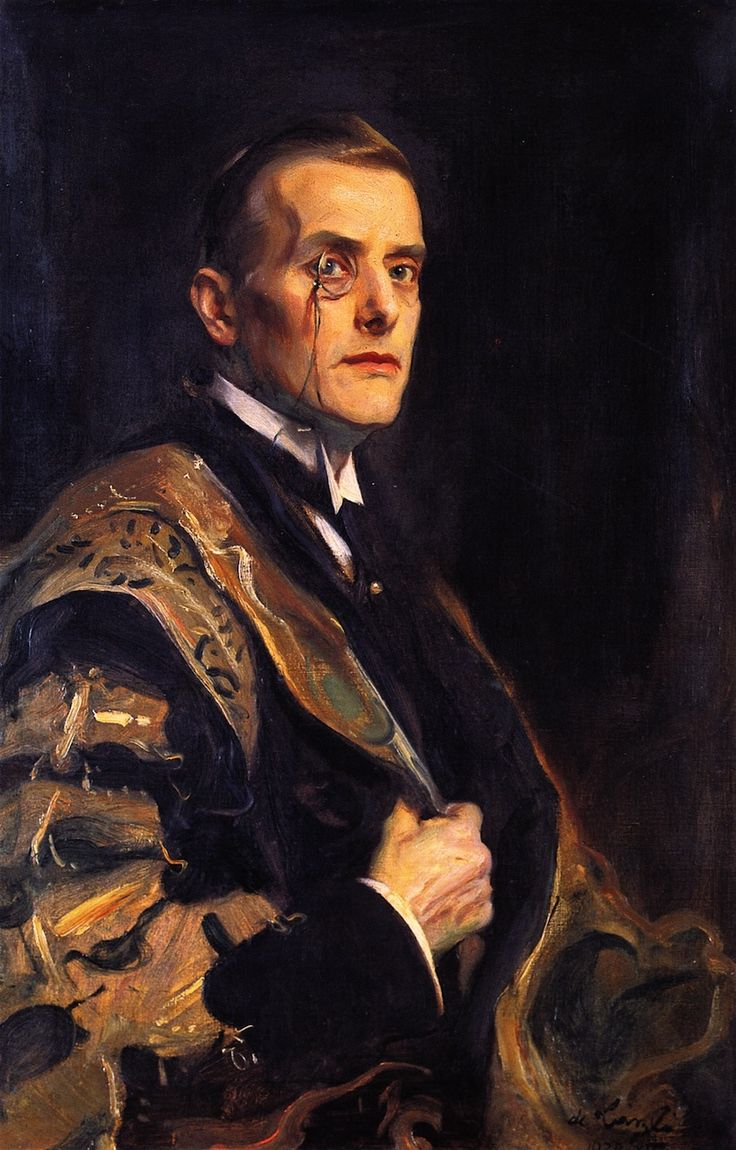
Austen Chamberlain, Neville's half-brother

Chamberlain's business interests did not completely fill his time, and he indulged his love of natural history and other outdoor pursuits. He spent many Sundays working in the gardens and greenhouses at Highbury. He enjoyed long walks in the countryside, and developed a passion for hunting and fishing. Even as he approached the heights of his political career, he would contribute articles to journals such as The Countryman. In 1931, he stated, "I really can't consent to die until they arrange some fishing in the next world." Chamberlain travelled extensively in Europe and North Africa, made a five-month tour to India, Ceylon and Burma in 1904–05, and according to his biographer, Robert Self, was one of the more travelled prime ministers.

Chamberlain also involved himself in civic activities in Birmingham. In 1906, Chamberlain was a founding member of the University House Committee at Birmingham University, the president of which was his aunt, Mrs Charles Beale, wife of the university's first Vice-Chancellor. He became an Official Visitor and then a director of the Birmingham General Hospital. He advocated a larger facility for the hospital, a cause in which he was eventually successful, though building did not commence until 1934 and he was still fundraising as prime minister. Stating that he was painfully aware of the defects of his own education, he played a part in the establishment of the University of Birmingham, of which Mason Science College became a part. Joseph Chamberlain became the university's first chancellor; Neville Chamberlain was appointed to its council and later to its Board of Governors.

Though he declared himself uninterested in politics, Chamberlain supported his father's views loyally. He made speeches in support of British policy towards the Boers and when the Boer War broke out, supported the British war effort. During the "Khaki election" of 1900 he made speeches in support of Joseph Chamberlain's Liberal Unionists, which were allied with the Conservatives and later merged with them. In 1903, Chamberlain fell in love with Rosalind Sellor, a London professional singer, and repeatedly journeyed to the capital to be with her. The following year, she decided she preferred another man, leaving Chamberlain distraught. In 1910, he fell in love with Anne Cole, a distant relative by marriage, and the following year married her. Anne Chamberlain proved to be a loyal supporter of her husband and got along well with his maiden sisters. The two had a son and a daughter, with Neville Chamberlain involving himself deeply in the children's upbringing.

When he became prime minister in 1937 Chamberlain paid tribute to his wife:

I never should have become P.M. if I hadn't had Annie to help me. It isn't only that she charms every one into good humour & makes them think that a man can't be so bad who has a wife like that ... But besides all this she has softened & smoothed my natural impatience and dislike of anything with a whiff of humbug about it and I know she has saved me from making an impression of hardness that was not intended."

== Early political career (1911–1922) ==
=== Birmingham politician ===
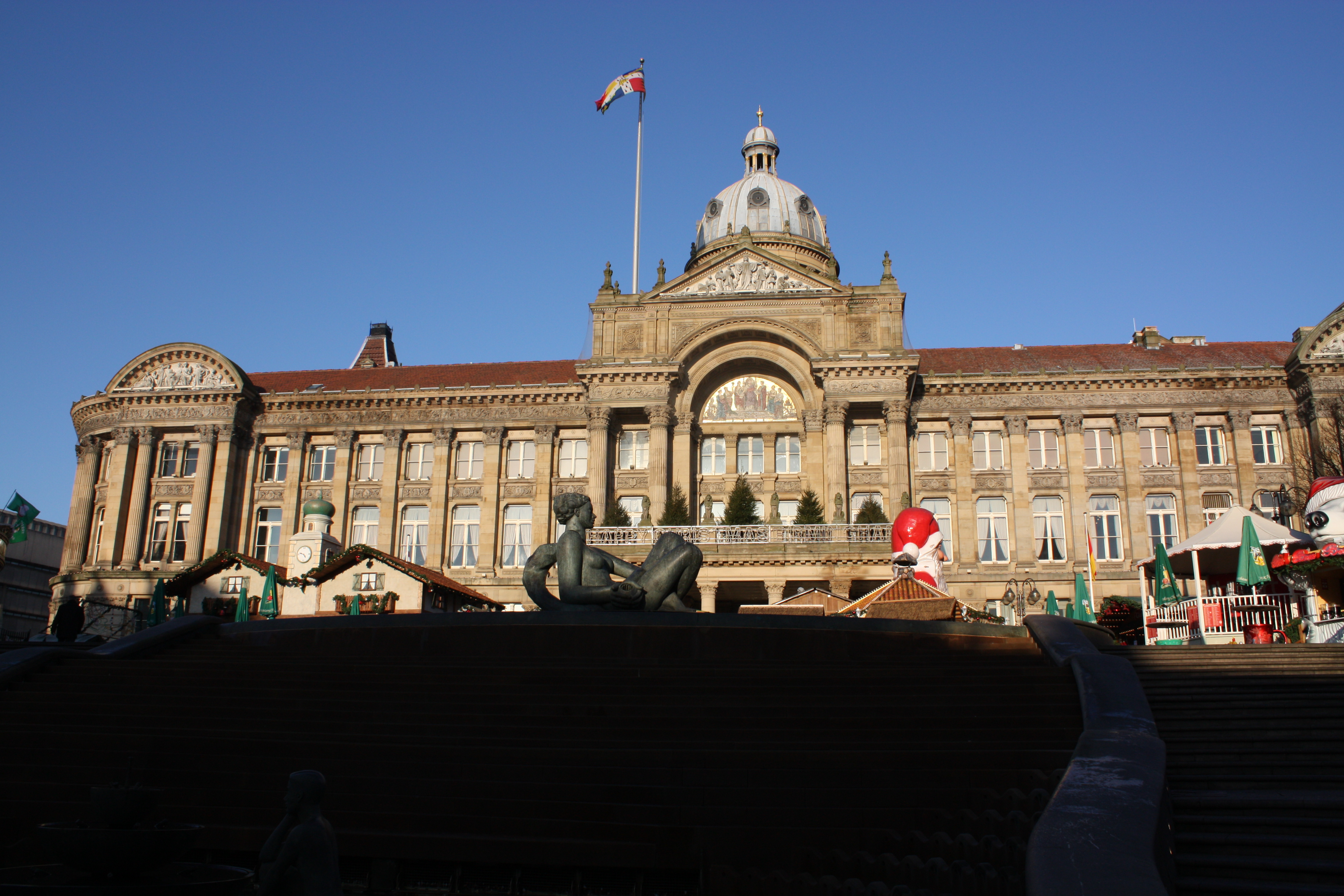
Birmingham Council House, Victoria Square, Birmingham

While Chamberlain had continued to give speeches at general elections, his entry into politics at age 42 in 1911 stemmed from interest in local politics and the opportunities they offered for social improvement. In 1910, Chamberlain appeared before a Parliamentary committee, testifying in favour of a bill to merge Birmingham with its suburbs. The bill passed, tripling the size of the city and greatly increasing its population. Chamberlain was very interested in city planning for Birmingham. In November 1911, standing as a Liberal Unionist, he was elected to Birmingham City Council for All Saints' Ward, located within his father's parliamentary constituency. Chamberlain's party merged with the Conservatives the following year, forming the Unionist Party, which was given its present formal name of the Conservative and Unionist Party in 1925.

Upon his election, Chamberlain was made chairman of the Town Planning Committee, which sketched out four development schemes covering 15,000 acres (61 km^{2}) in the city, allowing for suburban development while preserving green space. In 1913, he led a committee looking at housing conditions in Birmingham. It was a forerunner to the parliamentary Unhealthy Areas Committee (1919–1921), of which he was chairman. Chamberlain found that over 100,000 housing units lacked toilet facilities, with nearly half of those not even having running water. He advocated gradual reorganisation to abate the problem, and warned that the city government must be ready to take over property if the private sector failed. Under Chamberlain's direction, Birmingham soon adopted one of the first town planning schemes in Britain which would, in time, be mirrored by other large industrial cities such as Liverpool and Leeds. However, the start of war in 1914 prevented implementation of his plans in Birmingham.

With the outbreak of World War I in August 1914, Chamberlain became deeply involved in the war effort. In addition to his duties as councillor, Chamberlain helped recruit men for the Royal Warwickshire Regiment and set up funds for injured soldiers. Late in 1914, he became an alderman of Birmingham, and the following year, became Lord Mayor. Chamberlain's biographer, Robert Self, suggested that as Joseph Chamberlain had died the previous year, the honour was due to Neville Chamberlain's hard work rather than to any family influence. As a Lord Mayor in wartime, Chamberlain had a tremendous burden of work, and he insisted that his councillors and officials work equally hard. He set up crèches for workers, stockpiled coal to be distributed to the poor at cost in time of shortage, and reinvigorated Birmingham's various committees, which were ineffective and engaged in wasteful rivalries. He also chaired the local committee evaluating exemptions from conscription, and stated that he was more lenient than were other members of the tribunal. He halved the Lord Mayor's expense allowance, and cut back on the number of civic functions expected of the incumbent.

Under Chamberlain, the group which became the City of Birmingham Symphony Orchestra was initiated. The Lord Mayor persuaded Sir Thomas Beecham to conduct a series of events in Birmingham. The concerts caused Birmingham to be regarded as a cultural centre, and in 1919, the Orchestra was formally founded. Chamberlain established the Birmingham Municipal Bank, the only one of its type in the country, which aimed to encourage savings to pay for the war loan. The bank proved highly successful and lasted until 1976, when it was taken over by Lloyds Bank. Chamberlain was re-elected Lord Mayor in 1916, but he did not complete his term.

=== Director of National Service ===
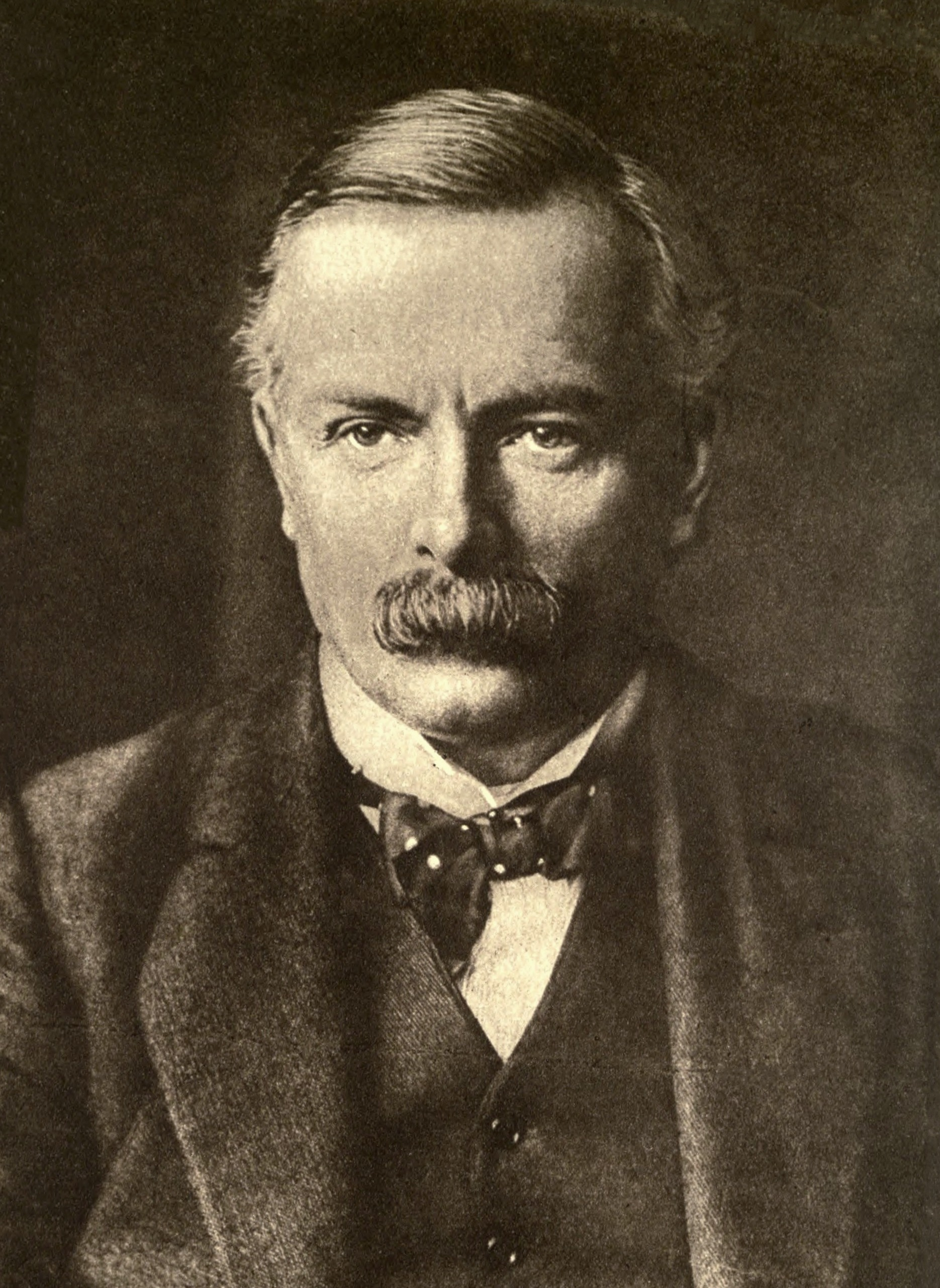
David Lloyd George, Prime Minister 1916–1922, whose contempt for Chamberlain was reciprocated

Conscription for the Army, but not for civilian industry, had been brought in during the first half of 1916. Towards the end of Asquith's Government in 1916 a Manpower Distribution Board had been set up under Neville's brother Austen, but it had no executive powers. After Edwin Montagu had refused the new position of Director of National Service, as he thought the task of building up a new ministry was beyond him, Chamberlain, who was already nationally known, was proposed for the job by his brother Austen. In December 1916, the new prime minister David Lloyd George offered him the job, with responsibility for co-ordinating conscription and ensuring that essential war industries were able to function with sufficient workforces. Though reluctant to leave his post in Birmingham, Chamberlain accepted and resigned as Lord Mayor.

To a great extent Chamberlain's actual responsibilities were left vague by Lloyd George. On his appointment Lloyd George implied in the House of Commons that "compulsion" (the industrial equivalent of conscription) was to be extended to industry and that Chamberlain would soon produce a system of industrial enrolment. However, Chamberlain found his work handicapped by the Prime Minister's political manoeuvres and need to appease the trade unions. As Chamberlain sought to maximise the number of workers subject both to military conscription and compulsion into industry, Lloyd George pledged to the unions that he would oppose any sort of "industrial conscription". Although Chamberlain repeatedly made proposals for mandatory service, they were turned down by Lloyd George and his War Cabinet. The Army still controlled its own recruitment at this stage, whilst Chamberlain met with resistance from the Ministries of Munitions and Labour. Chamberlain's proposal that all men under 21 be drafted from industry into the Army was blocked by Minister of Munitions Addison (19 January 1917), as it would have reduced munitions output by conscripting skilled young men who had already spent time in apprenticeships.

Chamberlain was not made a Privy Councillor. He also spurned advice from Lloyd George about his choice of advisors (apart from James Stevenson from the Ministry of Munitions who was briefly Deputy for Civil Recruiting), instead appointing cronies from Birmingham who were as out of their depth as he was. Chamberlain nearly resigned in June 1917 when, having not been told or consulted, he read in the newspapers that he had been given a new Parliamentary Secretary.

Denied the use of compulsion, Chamberlain had to persuade Britons to volunteer for essential war work, and fit young workers to leave the factories and enter the Army. He had to address mass meetings and issue posters. He found that workers were reluctant to exchange the comforts of home and wartime salaries for the uncertainties of the trenches and a wage of one shilling a day. Chamberlain had little confidence in voluntary schemes and they indeed proved unsuccessful, with only 9,000 workers freed to be drafted into the Army at a time when Britain was sustaining huge casualties.

Chamberlain finally resigned on 8 August 1917. He was thanked warmly by the staff at St Ermin's Hotel where the Ministry was housed. Lloyd George wrote to his family (in Welsh) that "Neville Chamberlain has resigned and thank God for that." (Note: Chamberlain blamed his failure on his lack of political experience, an explanation not accepted by Lloyd George's biographer John Grigg, as the shipowner Joseph Maclay – who in a breach of convention was not a member of either House – made a great success of the job of Minister of Shipping. Chamberlain's biographer Iain Macleod (1961, p61), himself a Conservative Cabinet Minister, argued that he had made the mistake of waiting to be told what to do, and that by Christmas Day 1916 he should have been threatening resignation unless given clear instructions, as such a threat is strongest when a minister is first appointed. Grigg argues that much of Chamberlain's failure can be put down to lack of self-confidence. He also argues that Chamberlain later displayed disastrously excessive confidence as Prime Minister, having in between been an "outstanding" Minister of Health and a "competent" Chancellor.(Grigg 2002, p. 212)) He met with considerable sympathy from members of parliament after his resignation. John Dillon, an Irish Nationalist MP, stated that "if Mr. Chamberlain were an archangel, or if he were Hindenburg and Bismarck and all the great men of the world rolled into one, his task would be wholly beyond his powers". Unionist Party leader Bonar Law spoke of the "absolutely impossible task" Chamberlain had faced. Auckland Geddes, Chamberlain's successor, was made a Privy Councillor and had more power and more support from the War Cabinet than Chamberlain had had.

The relationship between Chamberlain and Lloyd George was thenceforth one of hatred, with Chamberlain calling Lloyd George "that dirty little Welsh Attorney" and being implacably opposed to Lloyd George joining the National Government in the 1930s. Austen Chamberlain, the brother of one opponent and, for a time, the political ally of the other, regretted the enmity, "More's the pity, for together if they were together they might do a great deal." Lloyd George would later paint a most unflattering portrait of Chamberlain in his 1935 War Memoirs, claiming that "Mr Chamberlain is a man of rigid competency. Such men have their uses in conventional times … and are indispensable for filling subordinate posts at all times. But they are lost in an emergency or in creative tasks at any time." His dislike of Chamberlain is sometimes said to have been based on phrenology (According to Leo Amery, one of Lloyd George's fatal character flaws was to sum people up by their facial features, he had never seen anyone with such a small head, and he constantly called Neville "pin head"), although little contemporary evidence has been found to confirm this. Lloyd George would also have the last laugh in May 1940, when his speech in the Norway Debate helped bring down Chamberlain's government.

=== Candidate and backbencher ===
Having resigned as Director, Chamberlain returned to Birmingham, embittered by his experience in London. He wrote that the experience "reminds me of the Bahamas when the plants didn't grow". He had retained his seat on the City Council and busied himself with his civic duties, as well as his business interests and family life. In February 1918, having declined a third term as Lord Mayor, he was appointed Deputy Mayor.

Chamberlain had formed a close friendship with his cousin, Norman Chamberlain, who had also served on the City Council and who shared the future prime minister's social ideals. In December 1917, Norman Chamberlain was reported missing in action during the Battle of Cambrai, and in February 1918, Norman's body was found—a great blow to Neville Chamberlain, who described Norman as "the most intimate friend I had". Through the rest of his career, Neville Chamberlain laboured to further the ideals of his cousin, and wrote his biography—the only book he ever wrote. Some historians relate Norman's death to a hatred of war on his cousin's part which led to appeasement; according to Chamberlain's biographer Nick Smart, the death did not cause Chamberlain to hate World War I, and any influence on his later positions is far from certain.

After some hesitation as to his future career, Chamberlain determined to enter Parliament, though, after his experience with National Service, he feared that he would only have a brief, unsatisfying parliamentary career. Wishing to stand for a Birmingham constituency, he initially had some difficulty in finding one. The Representation of the People Act 1918 gave Birmingham five additional seats, and Chamberlain was adopted as candidate for one of the new seats, Birmingham Ladywood. With the election on hold until the conclusion of the war, he continued his work in Birmingham. Shortly after the Armistice, his sister Beatrice died in the influenza pandemic, and Chamberlain mourned her, "She had the warmest heart." With the war ended, a general election was called almost immediately. Chamberlain stood as a Unionist (as the Conservative Party was known from 1912 to 1925) and was given the "coupon" or letter of endorsement granted by Coalition party leaders Lloyd George and Bonar Law to approved candidates, though he declined to make any use of it. He was elected with almost 70% of the vote and a majority of 6,833. At age 49, he was then the oldest man to enter Parliament for the first time and later become prime minister.

Chamberlain threw himself into Parliamentary work, begrudging the times when he was unable to attend debates and spending much time on committee work. When Austen Chamberlain, Chancellor of the Exchequer in the continued coalition government led by the Liberal Prime Minister, Lloyd George, tried to recruit him to serve on an additional committee, Neville Chamberlain informed his half-brother that he could only serve if it met between midnight and 7:30 am. Chamberlain took time to assure the future of the Birmingham Savings Bank, and Parliament passed an act which removed onerous restrictions from the bank. In March 1920, he was offered a junior post at the Ministry of Health by Bonar Law on behalf of the Prime Minister, but was unwilling to serve under Lloyd George despite Bonar Law's warnings that Chamberlain, now past fifty, might never be offered another chance to serve in government, as Lloyd George was likely to remain premier for a very long time. Chamberlain was offered no further posts during Lloyd George's premiership, and when Bonar Law resigned as party leader, Austen Chamberlain took his place as leader of the Unionists in Parliament.

Unionist backbenchers had long been restive as Lloyd George granted the Liberals in the Coalition more than their proportionate share of offices. In October 1922, discontent among Unionists against the Lloyd George Coalition Government erupted. When Unionist MPs were summoned to the Carlton Club for a meeting to receive their instructions for the forthcoming election, which, as in 1918 was to be fought in coalition with the Lloyd George Liberals, they instead rebelled and voted to fight the election as a single party. Lloyd George resigned as prime minister. Most Unionist leaders, including Austen Chamberlain, had supported the Coalition and advocated its continuation. They resigned from their government and party offices, with Austen Chamberlain writing, "The meeting today rejected our advice. Other men who have given other counsels must inherit our burden". Bonar Law was recalled from retirement to lead the Unionists as prime minister. Neville Chamberlain was in Canada at the time of the meeting and so was not forced to choose between supporting his brother's leadership and bringing down a prime minister he despised.

== Minister (1922–1937) ==
=== Bonar Law Government; early ministerial office ===
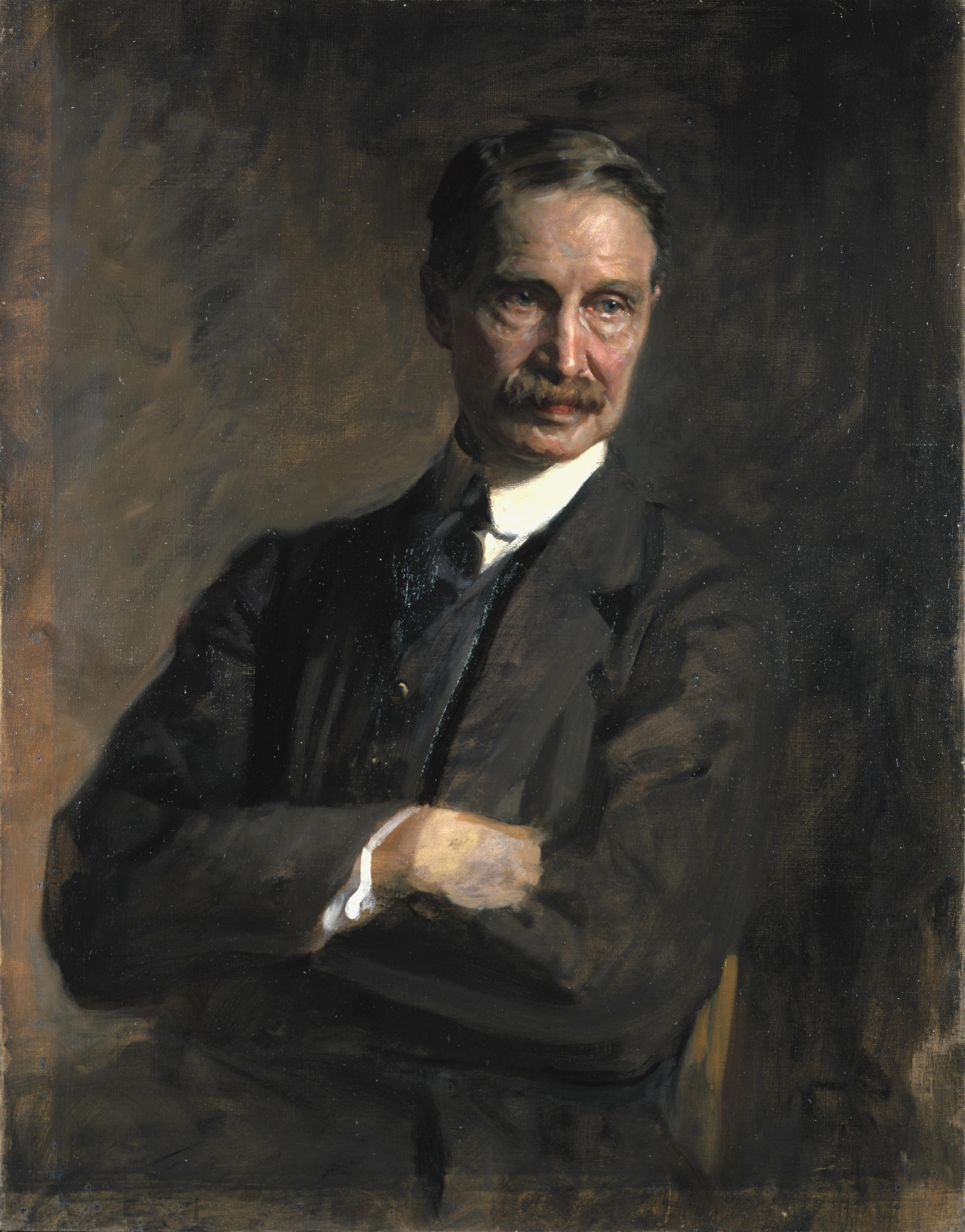
Painting of Prime Minister Bonar Law

Many frontbench Unionists refused to serve under Bonar Law, who was forced to form his Cabinet from lower-ranking party members. Liberal MP Winston Churchill, who would lose his seat in the upcoming election, dubbed Bonar Law's ministry "a government of the second eleven". (Note: A British term for the association football or cricket players who do not play on the top team, but who make up a team immediately below them in rank. Most common in schools.) The conflict amongst the Unionists greatly benefited Neville Chamberlain, who rose, over the course of ten months, from backbencher to Chancellor of the Exchequer.

Bonar Law appointed Chamberlain as Postmaster General, a ministerial post below Cabinet level. Bonar Law called an election shortly after his accession, which the Unionists won, and Chamberlain was re-elected, though his prediction that his seat was "safe as houses" proved dubious—his majority was reduced to 2,443. In January 1923, Chamberlain granted the first operating licence to the British Broadcasting Company, though he opposed its request to broadcast the King's Speech setting forth the Government's programme in opening Parliament. Chamberlain feared that allowing the speech to be aired would lead to broadcast of parliamentary debates over the radio, "a prospect which makes one shudder".

Sir Arthur Griffith-Boscawen, the Minister of Health, had lost his seat in the 1922 General Election and failed to win a by-election in March 1923. Housing fell within the remit of the Minister of Health. As Chamberlain had experience in developing housing programmes in Birmingham, Bonar Law offered the Health Ministry, within the Cabinet, to him. Chamberlain was initially reluctant, feeling that he should not leave the Post Office before he "had a chance of doing something there", but decided that "it would not be playing the game" to refuse Bonar Law's request. There was a great shortage of housing in Britain as a result of pent-up demand from the war years, and almost all housing was rent controlled, giving builders little incentive to build more. Any removal of rent restrictions would be wildly unpopular. Chamberlain introduced a Housing Act in April 1923 that provided subsidies for private companies, and extended rent control until 1925. He expected rent control to be gradually abolished as the housing supply increased, but the restrictions remained in force until 1933, when a new scheme was enacted.

In May 1923, Bonar Law was diagnosed with advanced terminal throat cancer. He immediately resigned, and King George V sent for the Chancellor of the Exchequer, Stanley Baldwin, to form a government. Baldwin served as his own chancellor for three months while he sought a successor and then promoted Chamberlain to the position. Chamberlain had little time for any policy changes, as he served only five months in the office and did not present a budget. Though the Unionists had an ample majority in the House of Commons and the current Parliament had four years to run, Baldwin decided that a general election was needed and that the Unionists should fight it on the issue of tariff reform. He hoped to gain both a personal mandate as prime minister and a policy mandate for his tariff proposals. He miscalculated badly: in the general election held in December 1923 the Unionists remained the largest party in the House of Commons, but were outnumbered by the combined Liberal and Labour MPs. The Baldwin Government retained office until it was defeated when Parliament assembled in January 1924, and Ramsay MacDonald became the first Labour Prime Minister. Chamberlain's majority in Birmingham Ladywood was cut yet again, this time to 1,500 votes.

With the Unionists in opposition, Chamberlain managed to broker a reconciliation between his brother (and the other Coalitionists) and the new leadership, and Austen Chamberlain resumed his place on the front benches. The Labour government fell within months, necessitating another general election. Neville Chamberlain was challenged by Labour candidate Oswald Mosley, who later led the British Union of Fascists. Mosley campaigned aggressively in Ladywood; and accused Chamberlain of being a "landlords' hireling". The outraged Chamberlain demanded that Mosley retract the claim "as a gentleman". Mosley, whom Baldwin described as "a cad and a wrong 'un", refused to retract the allegation. It took several recounts before Chamberlain was declared the winner by 77 votes and Mosley blamed poor weather for the result. Chamberlain had not wanted to desert Ladywood, but now deemed the seat impossible to hold and was adopted for Birmingham Edgbaston for the next election (held in 1929), at which Ladywood fell to Labour by eleven votes. The Unionists won the 1924 election, their last under that name before reverting to the older name "Conservative". Baldwin formed a new government, in which Austen was Foreign Secretary and Neville Chamberlain declined to serve again as chancellor, preferring his former position as Minister of Health.

=== Minister of Health ===
Within two weeks of his appointment as Minister of Health, Chamberlain presented the Cabinet with an agenda containing 25 pieces of legislation he hoped to see enacted. Before he left office in 1929, 21 of the 25 had passed into law. An early, very popular piece of legislation was the Widows', Orphans' and Old Age Contributory Pensions Act 1925 (15 & 16 Geo. 5. c. 70), passed after the Chancellor of the Exchequer, Winston Churchill, had agreed to find whatever money was needed to fund the Act. Churchill, recently returned to the Conservative ranks after nineteen years as a Liberal (1904–1923), expressed envy at Chamberlain's receiving the credit for the Act, and the Minister of Health described his colleague as "a man of tremendous drive & vivid imagination but obsessed with the glory of doing something spectacular which should erect monuments to him". The Act lowered the age for receiving the government old age pension from 70 to 65, as well as providing for dependents of deceased workers. Though the pension sum, ten shillings (today about £20) per week, was not enough for a pensioner to make ends meet, Chamberlain stated that it was not intended to replace private thrift and that the sum was the maximum financially feasible.

Chamberlain sought the abolition of the elected Poor Law Boards of Guardians, which administered relief and which in some areas were responsible for setting rates (local property taxes). Many of the Boards were controlled by Labour, and had defied the Government by distributing relief funds to the able-bodied unemployed. Chamberlain's first step in the direction of abolition was the Rating and Valuation Act 1925 (15 & 16 Geo. 5. c. 90), which greatly reduced the number of authorities which administered rates, as well as imposing uniform standards for assessment. Despite policy differences Chamberlain continued to work with Churchill, who showed him the manuscript of a volume of his heavily autobiographical The World Crisis. Churchill confided that he would have wished for two more years to revise the manuscript; Chamberlain wrote to his sisters that he could have done the job in two hours—with a pair of scissors.

Though Chamberlain struck a conciliatory note during the 1926 General Strike, in general he had poor relations with the Labour opposition. Future Labour Prime Minister Clement Attlee complained that Chamberlain "always treated us like dirt", and Chamberlain wrote in April 1927, "More and more do I feel an utter contempt for their lamentable stupidity." One Labour MP referred to Chamberlain as "a miniature Mussolini", and others claimed that Chamberlain's policies had allowed entire communities to starve, dubbing him the "Minister of Death". His poor relations with the Labour Party eventually played a major part in his downfall as prime minister.

With many mining communities suffering high levels of unemployment following the General Strike, some Poor Law boards granted relief to unemployed workers by misusing provisions intended for exceptional circumstances. These boards used the provisions to give benefits to nearly all applicants. With the system thrown into crisis, Chamberlain sought legislation to permit the Minister of Health to dismiss recalcitrant boards, and later got Parliament to pass further legislation to prescribe criminal penalties to members of such boards. Though no board members were prosecuted, Chamberlain dismissed three boards, replacing their members with his own appointees. Finally, in 1929, Chamberlain brought in legislation to abolish the Poor Law boards entirely, replacing them with bodies appointed by local authorities. Chamberlain spoke in the Commons for two and a half hours on the second reading of the Bill, and when he concluded, he was applauded by all parties. The Local Government Act 1929 passed by an ample majority, and the Morning Post commented that (despite Labour attacks), it had been found to be impossible to make it unpopular.

=== Return to opposition ===
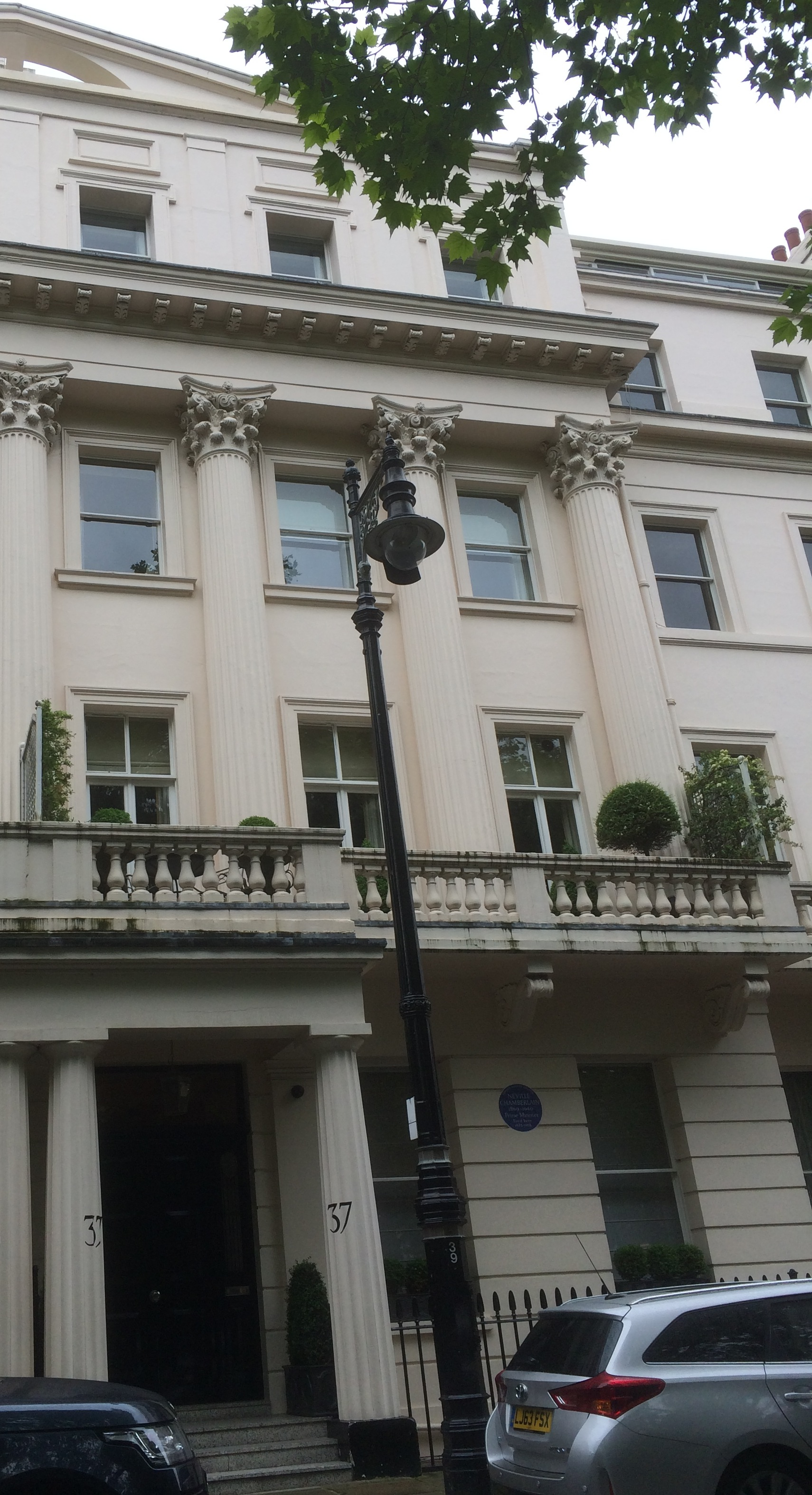
37 Eaton Square, where Chamberlain lived most of the time while in London until 1935

Baldwin called a general election for 30 May 1929. Chamberlain expected the Conservatives to triumph easily, and thought he would be moved either to the Exchequer or be asked to serve at the Colonial Office, where Joseph Chamberlain had made his mark. Chamberlain easily won in Edgbaston, which he represented for the rest of his life, but the general election resulted in a hung parliament, with Labour holding the most seats. Baldwin and his Government resigned, and Labour leader Ramsay MacDonald took office.

Chamberlain anticipated that Labour would govern for two years, then seek another general election and be returned for a second term with an overall majority in Parliament. He believed that, were this to occur, at 67 he might well be too old to hold office again when that term expired. With no ministerial responsibilities, he departed on a three-month tour of East Africa, hoping it might be useful were he to serve in future as Colonial Secretary. As the minority Labour Government attempted to grapple with the onset of the Depression, the Conservative Party indulged in a period of internecine warfare, with Baldwin under attack in the Parliamentary Party and in the press for losing the election, and for being too moderate. Chamberlain attempted to mediate between the press lords and Baldwin, only to learn that the newspaper owners had been trying to influence local constituency organisations behind his back. During the leadership crisis, Chamberlain persuaded Conservative Party chairman J. C. C. Davidson to resign to relieve the pressure on Baldwin. Chamberlain took the vacant chair himself.

The campaign by the press lords, notably Lord Beaverbrook and Lord Rothermere for "Empire Free Trade", the removal of tariffs within the Empire, culminated in a crucial by-election at which the press lords ran their own candidate under the banner of the United Empire Party. Robert Topping, the General Director at Conservative Central Office, produced a memorandum showing that Baldwin's support had eroded tremendously. Chamberlain confronted Baldwin with the memorandum. Baldwin was badly shaken, and told Chamberlain he would resign. After a day, Baldwin reconsidered, and even considered giving up his seat and standing in the by-election himself. When Chamberlain told Baldwin that if he stood and lost, his successor would be badly damaged, Baldwin replied, "I don't give a damn about my successor, Neville." Chamberlain resigned as party chairman, though he continued as head of the Conservative Research Department, which he had founded, until his death. Baldwin did not stand in the by-election, but he retained his position and attacked the press barons as wanting "power without responsibility, the prerogative of the harlot through the ages", (Note: Baldwin was quoting a letter by his cousin, Rudyard Kipling, see Fitzgerald 2004.) and the Conservatives won the election. Baldwin and Chamberlain healed their breach, and Chamberlain helped negotiate the return of the press lords to the Conservative fold. Baldwin led the Conservative Party for another six years. In January 1931, Churchill, one of Chamberlain's leadership rivals, left the Conservative front bench in a dispute over policy on India.

In 1931, the MacDonald Government faced a serious crisis, as the May Report revealed that the budget was unbalanced, with an expected shortfall of £120 million. As this information became public, there was a run on the pound, depleting the nation's gold reserves. The Labour Party refused to consider the massive cuts in unemployment compensation which would be needed to balance the budget, and Prime Minister MacDonald sought support from outside his party. With Baldwin on holiday in France, Chamberlain negotiated for the Conservatives. Chamberlain told MacDonald that the Conservatives would only join a coalition if the full recommended cuts in unemployment compensation were made. Finally, on 24 August 1931, the Labour Government resigned and MacDonald formed a National Government, supported by most Conservative and Liberal MPs and a minority of the Labour Party. Chamberlain once more returned to the Ministry of Health. The National Government was intended as only a temporary expedient, but governed Britain until Chamberlain's fall in 1940. In the ensuing General Election, the National Government won 554 of the 615 seats in the House of Commons, with 473 of its supporters Conservative MPs.

=== Chancellor and Conservative heir apparent ===
After the election, MacDonald wanted to designate Liberal National Walter Runciman, an advocate of free trade, as chancellor. Conservatives insisted that a member of their party who favoured tariffs be given the office. Reluctantly, MacDonald designated Chamberlain as chancellor, and Runciman was made President of the Board of Trade. Chamberlain proposed a 10% tariff on foreign goods, with lower or no tariffs on goods from the colonies and the Dominions. Joseph Chamberlain had advocated a similar policy, "Imperial Preference"; his sons found it pleasing and appropriate that Chamberlain could now promote his father's policies, and Sir Austen Chamberlain wrote to his brother in November 1931, "Father's great work will be completed in his children."

The tariff issue bitterly divided the Cabinet, and threatened to end the National Government. The Cabinet accepted a proposal by Lord Hailsham, Secretary of State for War, that they agree publicly to disagree, a rare suspension of the doctrine of Cabinet collective responsibility. Chamberlain prepared his tariff bill, which exempted the Dominions pending the Ottawa Conference, set for later that year. On 4 February 1932, he laid it before the Commons. Addressing a packed House, with the Prince of Wales, the Duke of York and Joseph Chamberlain's third wife in the gallery, and with his brother seated behind him, Chamberlain concluded by referring to his father's inability to get a similar proposal adopted,

I think he would have found consolation for the bitterness of his disappointments, if he could have seen that these proposals, which are the direct and legitimate descendants of his own conception, would be laid before the House of Commons, which he loved, in the presence of one and by the lips of another of the two immediate successors to his name and blood.

At the end of the speech, Sir Austen Chamberlain walked down and shook his brother's hand. The Import Duties Act 1932 passed Parliament easily. The Ottawa Conference that August produced little result, with Chamberlain bringing home several minor bilateral trade agreements, and no general agreement.

In the interim between the Import Duties Act and the Ottawa Conference, Chamberlain presented his first budget, in April 1932. The gold standard had been abandoned in the early days of the National Government; the Bank of England sought its restoration. Chamberlain, on advice from his officials, declined to restore the gold standard, realising that a devalued pound would improve the balance of trade. Otherwise, Chamberlain maintained the severe budget cuts that had been agreed to at the inception of the National Government: Chamberlain cut means-tested benefits and public sector wages, which proved to be an unpopular move. He also cut interest rates, which led to a housebuilding boom in the south of England and supported plans to clear slums. Interest on the war debt had been a major cost in each budget. Chamberlain was able to reduce the interest rate on most of Britain's war debt from 5% to 3.5%. Between 1932 and 1938, Chamberlain halved the percentage of the budget devoted to payment of interest on the war debt.

Chamberlain hoped that a cancellation of the war debt owed to the United States could be negotiated. In June 1933, Britain hosted the World Monetary and Economic Conference. Describing the event as the "most crucial gathering since Versailles", Time magazine featured Chamberlain on its cover, referring to him as "that mighty mover behind British Cabinet scenes, lean, taciturn, iron-willed ... It is no secret that Scot MacDonald remains Prime Minister by Prime Mover Chamberlain's leave." The Conference came to nothing, when US President Franklin Roosevelt sent word that he would not consider any war debt cancellation. After the US Congress passed the Johnson Act, forbidding loans to nations in default on their debts, Chamberlain felt that Britain could not pay the entire debt, and, as the Act made no distinction between a partial and complete default, the Chancellor entirely suspended Britain's war debt payments to the US.

In 1934, Chamberlain was able to declare a budget surplus, and restore many of the cuts in unemployment compensation and civil servant's salaries he had made after taking office. He told the Commons, "We have now finished the story of Bleak House and are sitting down this afternoon to enjoy the first chapter of Great Expectations." With MacDonald in physical and mental decline and Conservative Party leader Baldwin exhibiting ever greater lethargy, Chamberlain increasingly became the workhorse of the National Government.

Defence spending had been heavily cut in Chamberlain's early budgets. By 1935, faced with a resurgent Germany under Hitler's leadership, he was convinced of the need for rearmament, and was the driving force behind Defence White Papers advocating rearmament in 1936 and 1937. Chamberlain especially urged the strengthening of the Royal Air Force, realising that Britain's traditional bulwark, the English Channel, was no defence against air power. Rearmament was an unpopular policy in Britain, and Labour attacked Chamberlain as a warmonger. Labour leader and Leader of the Opposition Clement Attlee spoke against the 1936 Budget as tremendously overspending on defence: "Everything was devoted to piling up the instruments of death." Churchill also criticised the National Government's defence plans, though he called for an even faster buildup. Despite the sniping from both sides, Chamberlain was very concerned about the expense of rearmament, "What a frightful bill we do owe to Master Hitler, damn him! If it only wasn't for Germany, we should be having such a wonderful time just now."

In 1935, MacDonald stood down as prime minister, taking Baldwin's post as Lord President of the council, and Baldwin became prime minister for the third time. Chamberlain remained at the Treasury, almost the only Cabinet member not to be moved in the subsequent reshuffle. Chamberlain was still spoken of as 'heir apparent', but feared being eclipsed by a younger man. To be seen more as the second man of the Government, he insisted on moving into Number 11 Downing Street, the Chancellor's traditional residence, which had been occupied by Baldwin during MacDonald's premiership. Baldwin indicated his desire to remain in office until his 70th birthday in August 1937, but Chamberlain doubted he would last that long. In the 1935 General Election, the Conservative-dominated National Government lost 90 seats from the massive majority of 1931, but still retained an overwhelming majority of 255 in the House of Commons. During the campaign, Deputy Labour Leader Arthur Greenwood attacked Chamberlain for spending money on re-armament, stating that the re-armament policy was "the merest scaremongering, disgraceful in a statesman of Mr. Chamberlain's responsible position, to suggest that more millions of money needed to be spent on armaments".

In January 1936, Edward VIII became king on the death of his father, George V. Chamberlain supported Baldwin's stance that King Edward must abdicate if he wished to marry the woman he loved, Wallis Warfield Simpson, a divorcee. After the conclusion of the Abdication Crisis, Baldwin announced that he would remain until shortly after the Coronation of King Edward's successor George VI. King George was crowned on 12 May 1937; Baldwin resigned on 28 May, advising the King to send for Chamberlain. Sir Austen did not live to see his brother's final "climb ... to the top of the greasy pole", (Note: A well-known quotation by Disraeli, see Meynell 1903, p. 155. Chamberlain later alluded to Disraeli in stating he had brought for the second time "peace with honour" from Germany to Downing Street after the Munich Conference; Disraeli had used the phrase about his return from the Congress of Berlin in 1878.) having died two months earlier.

== Appraisal ==
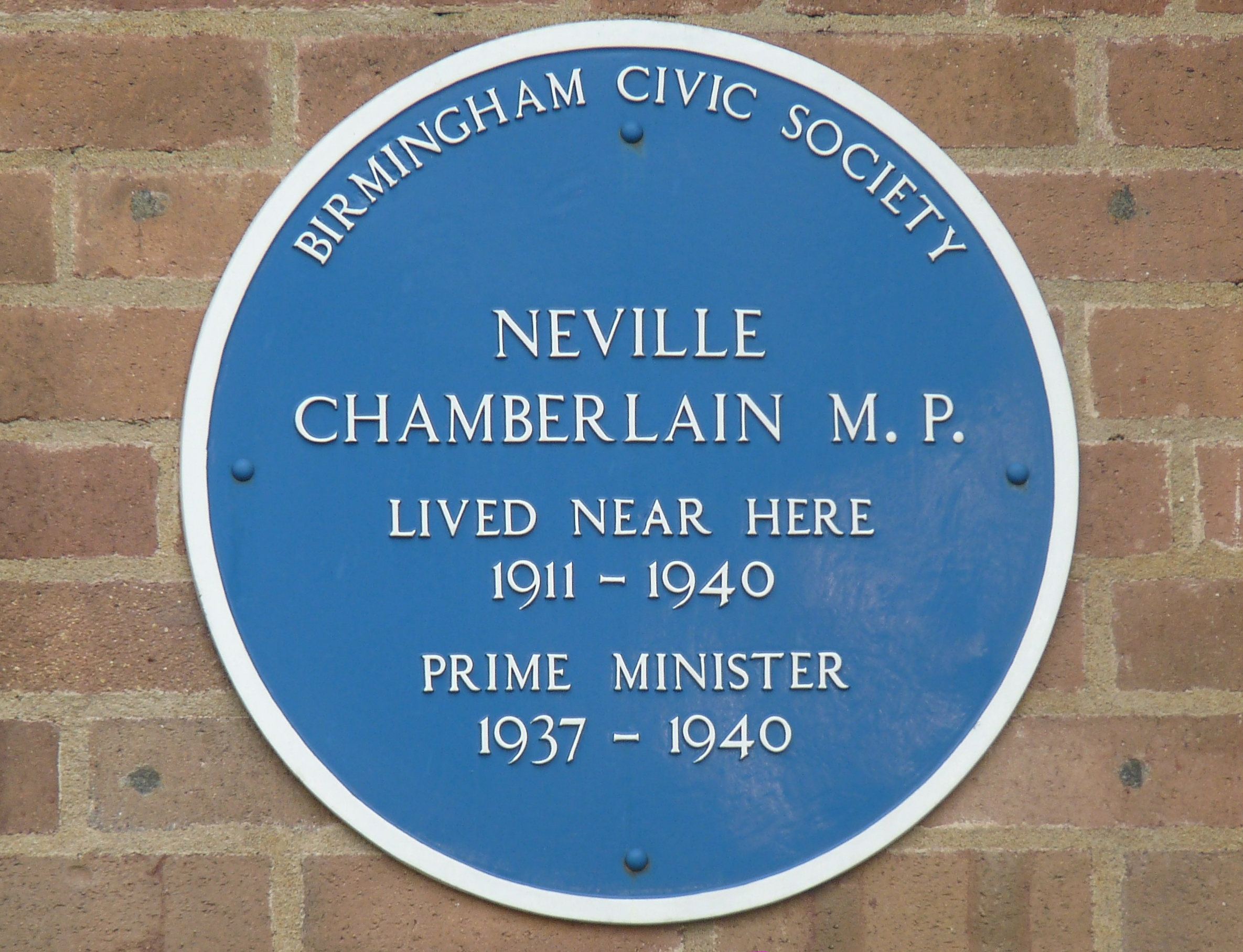
Blue plaque honouring Neville Chamberlain in Edgbaston, Birmingham

Polemics such as Guilty Men, which helped demolish Chamberlain's reputation for his foreign policy as premier, also touched on his record as minister. These books blamed the National Government, in which Chamberlain had taken a leading role, for a failure to rearm. Historian David Dutton suggested in his book on Chamberlain that the damage to his reputation, both as prime minister and as a Cabinet minister, could have been contained had the Conservative Party defended his policies, but for 23 years after Chamberlain's death, the party leaders (Churchill, Anthony Eden, and Harold Macmillan) had made reputations as opponents of appeasement, and were little minded to defend Chamberlain's record as a minister. The Labour landslide in the 1945 General Election cemented this inclination, with Macmillan stating that it was not "Churchill who had brought the Conservative party so low. On the contrary it was the recent history of the Party, with its pre-war record of unemployment and its failure to preserve peace."

The adoption of policies using Keynesian economics led to other criticisms of Chamberlain's ministerial record. Popular wisdom then held that governments could keep unemployment at a low level through spending. Chamberlain's acceptance of unemployment as an inevitable part of the business cycle was seen as outdated. In 1958, as prime minister, Macmillan described a report advocating limits on public investment as "a very bad paper. Indeed a disgraceful paper. It might have been written by Mr. Neville Chamberlain's Government."

In 1961, a controversial biography of Chamberlain by Conservative Party chairman Iain Macleod defended Chamberlain's ministerial record. Macleod pointed out that Chamberlain had been a "most valiant" champion of rearmament as chancellor as early as 1934, but that little was done. According to Time magazine, Macleod saw Chamberlain as a "humanitarian industrialist, [a] progressive Lord Mayor of Birmingham and a dedicated Minister of Health who was damned as a 'Tory socialist'[.] Chamberlain had worked tirelessly in the '20s and '30s for the 'noble and fascinating ideal' of fashioning a better life for Britain's workingman."

The 1960s and 1970s saw a further reassessment of Chamberlain as a Cabinet minister. Historians such as A. J. P. Taylor pointed out that while the 1930s were a decade of misery for some, for most Britons, it was a time of rising living-standards, with unemployment concentrated in only a few regions of the country. As economists and historians came to question the assumption that the National Government could have spent its way out of unemployment, Chamberlain's tenure as chancellor was to an extent rehabilitated. American social historian Bentley Gilbert stated that Chamberlain was "the most successful social reformer in the seventeen years between 1922 and 1939 ... after 1922 no one else is really of any significance." According to Taylor, writing in 1965, Chamberlain did more to improve local government while serving as Health Minister than did anyone else in the 20th century.

In the 1980s Margaret Thatcher instituted economic policies reminiscent of Chamberlain's as chancellor—control of inflation (even at the expense of unemployment), minimisation of budget deficits, and low rates of direct taxation. This was a point not lost on the Labour Party, and the Trades Union Congress adopted a slogan of "Forwards to the Eighties not Backwards to the Thirties". Thatcher's critics denigrated both her policies and those of the 1930s in such comparisons, but she did not care to defend those of the 1930s. Thatcher stated that the historical justifications for her economic positions were the policies of the Victorian era.

Dutton, who traced the progress of Chamberlain's reputation through the years, wrote in 2001 that Chamberlain's accomplishments at the Ministry of Health were "considerable achievements by any standards" and stated that they should not be seen in isolation, but as part of "the authentic Chamberlain, a man who was throughout his life on the progressive left of the Conservative party, a committed believer in social progress and in the power of government at both the national and local level, to do good." Five years later, Chamberlain biographer Graham Macklin quoted Dutton in noting the eclipse of Chamberlain's earlier accomplishments by his later policy of appeasement:

As [Chamberlain's] entry in the Oxford Dictionary of National Biography observed, "Had Chamberlain retired in 1937, he would not have risked anything. He would have been a considerable figure in British political history, his career a study in success." But Chamberlain did not retire. He accepted the premiership imagining it to be his crowning glory. As it transpired it was his most bitter personal and political defeat. Thus was the "authentic Chamberlain"—the sincere social reformer—almost entirely obliterated from the popular consciousness by subsequent history and historiography.

== Parliamentary election results ==
General election 1918: Birmingham Ladywood (new seat)
Party	Candidate	Votes	%	±%
Conservative	Neville Chamberlain	9,405	69.5	
Labour	John Kneeshaw	2,572	19.0	
Liberal	Margery Corbett Ashby	1,552	11.5	
Majority		6,833	50.5	
Turnout		13,529	40.6	

General election 1922: Birmingham Ladywood
Party	Candidate	Votes	%	±%
Conservative	Neville Chamberlain	13,032	55.2	−14.3
Labour	Robert Dunstan	10,589	44.8	25.8
Majority		2,443	10.4	−40.1
Turnout		23,621	71.1	+30.5
Conservative hold		Swing	-15.6	

General election 1923: Birmingham Ladywood
Party	Candidate	Votes	%	±%
Conservative	Neville Chamberlain	12,884	53.2	−2.0
Labour	Robert Dunstan	11,330	46.8	2.0
Majority		1,554	6.4	−4.0
Turnout		24,214	72.0	+0.9
Conservative hold		Swing	-2.0	

General election 1924: Birmingham Ladywood
Party	Candidate	Votes	%	±%
Conservative	Neville Chamberlain	13,374	49.1	−4.1
Labour	Oswald Mosley	13,297	48.9	2.1
Liberal	Alfred William Bowkett	539	2.0	2.0
Majority		77	0.2	−3.8
Turnout		27,200	80.5	+8.5
Conservative hold		Swing	-3.1	

General election 1929: Birmingham Edgbaston
Party	Candidate	Votes	%	±%
Conservative	Neville Chamberlain	23,350	63.7	−12.9
Labour	William Henry Dashwood Caple	8,590	23.4	0.0
Liberal	Percy Reginald Coombs Young	4,720	12.9	12.9
Majority		14,760	40.3	−12.9
Turnout		36,166	70.0	+5.1
Conservative hold		Swing	-6.5	

General election 1931: Birmingham Edgbaston
Party	Candidate	Votes	%	±%
Conservative	Neville Chamberlain	33,085	86.5	22.8
Labour	W.W. Blaylock	5,157	13.5	−9.9
Majority		27,928	73.0	−40.1
Turnout		38,242	70.9	+0.9
Conservative hold		Swing	+16.4	

General election 1935: Birmingham Edgbaston
Party	Candidate	Votes	%	±%
Conservative	Neville Chamberlain	28,243	81.6	−4.9
Labour	Jerrold Adshead	6,381	18.4	4.9
Majority		21,862	63.2	−9.8
Turnout		34,624	62.4	+8.5
Conservative hold		Swing	-4.9	
