= 1976 Carshalton by-election =

UK parliamentary by-election

- 11 March 1976
Candidate	Nigel Forman	Colin Blau	John Hatherley
Party	Conservative	Labour	Liberal
Popular vote	20,753	11,021	6,028
MP before election
Robert Carr
Conservative
Elected MP
Nigel Forman
Conservative

A by-election was held on 11 March 1976 in the UK parliamentary constituency of Carshalton after the incumbent Conservative Member of Parliament (MP) Robert Carr was elevated to the House of Lords. The Conservatives held on to the seat in the by-election.

== Result ==
Carshalton by-Election, 1976
Party	Candidate	Votes	%	±%
Conservative	Nigel Forman	20,753	51.69	+6.29
Labour	Colin Blau	11,021	27.49	−10.46
Liberal	John Hatherley	6,028	15.01	−1.65
National Front	Terry Denville-Faulkner	1,851	4.61	New
Conservative Anti-Common Market	Reginald Simmerson	251	0.63	New
Logic Party	William Dunmore	133	0.33	New
Air, Road, Public Safety, White Resident	Bill Boaks	115	0.29	New
Majority		9,732	24.20	+16.8
Turnout		40,152	60.5	−13.8
Conservative hold		Swing	+8.4	
