= Walter Elliot (English politician) =

British politician & England international rugby union player (1910–1988)

Walter Elliot (17 February 1910 – 8 September 1988) was a British Conservative Party politician.

Elliot played seven Test matches for the England national rugby union team in the 1930s.

He was elected as Member of Parliament for Carshalton at a by-election in 1960, caused by the elevation to the peerage of the Conservative MP Antony Head. Elliot held the seat until he stood down at the February 1974 general election.

Parliament of the United Kingdom
Preceded by Antony Head	Member of Parliament for Carshalton; 1960 – February 1974	Succeeded by Robert Carr
Political offices
Preceded by Ioan Evans	Comptroller of the Household; 1970	Succeeded by Reginald Eyre
