= 1940 Mitcham by-election =

UK Parliamentary by-election

The 1940 Mitcham by-election was held on 19 August 1940. The by-election was held due to the death of the incumbent Conservative MP, Richard Meller. It was won by the Conservative candidate Malcolm Robertson, who was unopposed as during the Second World War the political parties in the Coalition Government had agreed not to contest by-elections when a vacancy arose in any of the seats held by the other coalition parties.
