= Tom Braddock =

British politician (1887–1976)

Thomas Braddock (31 August 1886 – 9 December 1976) was a British architect and Labour Party politician.

== Biography ==
Braddock was born in Kennington, London. He was educated at the Architectural Association School of Architecture, where he won the silver and bronze medals, and at the London County Council School of Building. He won the Grissell Gold Medal of the Royal Institute of British Architects (RIBA) in 1912, was elected a Licentiate of the RIBA in 1932, and practised in Wimbledon in partnership with A. S. Morris in the mid-1930s.

In 1931 and 1935 Braddock contested the very-Conservative Wimbledon seat for the Labour Party, being heavily beaten. He was a Labour MP for Mitcham from 1945 to 1950, when he was defeated by the Conservative Robert Carr. He subsequently stood, without success, for the Kingston-upon-Thames constituency in the 1959 and 1964 general elections, on both occasions failing to unseat the Conservative incumbent, John Boyd-Carpenter, and one final time in Wimbledon in 1966.

Braddock died in East Preston, Sussex.

Parliament of the United Kingdom
Preceded by Malcolm Robertson	Member of Parliament for Mitcham; 1945 – 1950	Succeeded by Robert Carr
