= Director of National Service =

The Director of National Service or Minister of National Service was a post that existed briefly in the British government. Although a political appointment, the initial holder was Neville Chamberlain who was not a Member of Parliament at the time. Chamberlain resigned in August 1917 when the War Cabinet decided to change the organisation of recruiting from the control of the War Office to the Directorate of National Service, a change which he disapproved.

== Directors of National Service 1916–1919 ==
- Neville Chamberlain (19 December 1916 – 8 August 1917) (resigned)
- Sir Auckland Geddes (17 August 1917 – 19 December 1919)

== See also ==
- Conscription in the United Kingdom
- Rise of Neville Chamberlain#Director of National Service
