= Thomas Worsfold =

British baronet and politician

Thomas Cato Worsfold

Member of Parliament for Mitcham
- In office 1918–1923
- Preceded by: New constituency
- Succeeded by: Chuter Ede

Personal details
- Born: 14 February 1861
- Died: 11 July 1936 (aged 75)

Sir Thomas Cato Worsfold, 1st Baronet DL JP (14 February 1861 – 11 July 1936) was a British baronet and politician. He gained an LLD from Trinity College Dublin and in 1918 he was elected as a Coalition Conservative Member of Parliament (MP) for Mitcham. He resigned from the House of Commons on 13 February 1923 by appointment as Steward of the Chiltern Hundreds. The following year he was created a baronet, of The Hall Place in the Parish of Mitcham in the County of Surrey.

Parliament of the United Kingdom
New constituency	Member of Parliament for Mitcham; 1918–1923	Succeeded by Chuter Ede
Baronetage of the United Kingdom
New creation	Baronet (of The Hall Place); 1924–1936	Extinct
