= Viscount Head =

Title in the Peerage of the United Kingdom

Viscount Head, of Throope in the County of Wiltshire, is a title in the Peerage of the United Kingdom. It was created in 1960 for the soldier and Conservative politician Antony Head. He had previously served as Secretary of State for War and as Minister of Defence. As of 2023 the title is held by his eldest son, the second Viscount, who succeeded in 1983.

The family seat is Throope Manor, near Salisbury, Wiltshire.

== Viscounts Head (1960) ==
- Antony Henry Head, 1st Viscount Head (1906–1983)
- Richard Antony Head, 2nd Viscount Head (b. 1937)

The heir apparent is the present holder's son the Hon. Henry Julian Head (b. 1980)

== Line of Succession ==
- Antony Henry Head, 1st Viscount Head (1906–1983)
  - Richard Antony Head, 2nd Viscount Head (born 1937)
    - (1) Hon. Henry Julian Head (b. 1980)
    - (2) Hon. George Richard Head (b. 1982)
      - (3) Leo Patrick Harold Head (b. 2013)
  - (4) Hon. Simon Andrew Head (b. 1944)

== Arms ==
Coat of arms of Viscount Head
| Crest A unicorn's head couped Sable armed and crined Or between two arrows erect points downward of the last. Escutcheon Sable a chevron Argent between two unicorns' heads couped in chief and in base as many arrows in saltire and filed by a ducal crown Or. Supporters On either side a Staffordshire terrier Sable gorged with a dog collar Or. Motto Study Quiet |
