= Mitcham (constituency) =

Parliamentary constituency in the United Kingdom, 1918–1974

- Former borough constituency for the House of Commons
- Extract from 1923 result: the blue central area which from 1918 creation until 1945 extended further south than other semi-urban seats of London's outskirts
- County: County of London, then Greater London

1918–1974
- Seats: One
- Created from: Wimbledon
- Replaced by: Mitcham and Morden, with Wallington & Beddington added to the Carshalton seat.
- During its existence contributed to new seat(s) of: Carshalton

Mitcham was a constituency comprising the emerging Mitcham, Wallington and Beddington suburbs of South London and until 1945 that of Carshalton, its largest of the area's four traditional divisions, in its south-west. It returned one Member of Parliament (MP) to the House of Commons of the Parliament of the United Kingdom by the first past the post system.

It was created for the 1918 general election from part of Wimbledon when it reached southwards up onto the North Downs, further south than Croydon South, and was abolished for the February 1974 general election.

Two of its MPs became Home Secretary, one after changing seat of candidature, on boundary reforms.

== Boundaries ==
1918–1945: The Urban Districts of Beddington and Wallington, Carshalton, and Mitcham (the latter as a northern end).

1945–1974: The Boroughs of Beddington and Wallington, and Mitcham (the latter as a northern end).

== Members of Parliament ==
Election	Member	Party	Notes
1918	Thomas Worsfold	Conservative	Resigned 1923
1923 by-election	James Chuter Ede	Labour	Subsequently, MP for South Shields; Home Secretary 1945–51; Leader of the House of Commons 1951
1923	Richard Meller	Conservative	Died 1940
1940 by-election	Malcolm Robertson	Conservative	
1945	Tom Braddock	Labour	
1950	Robert Carr	Conservative	Leader of the House of Commons 1972; Home Secretary 1972–74; subsequently MP for Carshalton

February 1974: constituency abolished: see Mitcham and Morden

== Election results ==
=== 1970s ===
General election 1970: Mitcham
Party	Candidate	Votes	%	±%
Conservative	Robert Carr	27,257	54.58	+8.85
Labour	Reginald C Vincent	22,047	44.15	−0.59
Communist	Sid French	638	1.28	+0.19
Majority		5,210	10.43	
Turnout		49,942	68.76	
Conservative hold		Swing	+4.72	

=== 1960s ===
General election 1966: Mitcham
Party	Candidate	Votes	%	±%
Conservative	Robert Carr	24,234	45.73	
Labour	Thomas J Higgs	23,706	44.74	
Liberal	Ross C Burgess	4,470	8.44	
Communist	Sid French	580	1.09	
Majority		528	0.99	
Turnout		52,990	79.43	
Conservative hold		Swing		

General election 1964: Mitcham
Party	Candidate	Votes	%	±%
Conservative	Robert Carr	25,087	46.61	
Labour	Roger Charles Mackay	21,175	39.34	
Liberal	William Antony Heath	6,902	12.82	
Communist	Sid French	657	1.22	New
Majority		3,912	7.27	
Turnout		53,821	79.19	
Conservative hold		Swing		

=== 1950s ===
General election 1959: Mitcham
Party	Candidate	Votes	%	±%
Conservative	Robert Carr	33,661	58.53	
Labour Co-op	Eric JC Smythe	23,845	41.47	
Majority		9,816	17.06	
Turnout		57,506	81.61	
Conservative hold		Swing		

General election 1955: Mitcham
Party	Candidate	Votes	%	±%
Conservative	Robert Carr	32,798	56.54	
Labour	Hugh Jenkins	25,208	43.46	
Majority		7,590	13.08	
Turnout		58,006	80.53	
Conservative hold		Swing		

General election 1951: Mitcham
Party	Candidate	Votes	%	±%
Conservative	Robert Carr	34,056	54.71	
Labour	Harry Randall	28,187	45.29	
Majority		5,869	9.42	
Turnout		62,243	84.60	
Conservative hold		Swing		

General election 1950: Mitcham
Party	Candidate	Votes	%	±%
Conservative	Robert Carr	31,881	50.77	
Labour	Tom Braddock	27,055	43.08	
Liberal	Doreen L Page	3,864	6.15	New
Majority		4,826	7.69	N/A
Turnout		62,800	85.84	
Conservative gain from Labour		Swing		

=== 1940s ===
General election 1945: Mitcham
Party	Candidate	Votes	%	±%
Labour	Tom Braddock	26,910	57.68	
Conservative	Malcolm Robertson	19,742	42.32	
Majority		7,168	15.36	N/A
Turnout		46,652	73.58	
Labour gain from Conservative		Swing		

1940 Mitcham by-election
Party	Candidate	Votes	%	±%
Conservative	Malcolm Robertson	Unopposed	N/A	N/A
Conservative hold				

=== 1930s ===
General election 1935: Mitcham
Party	Candidate	Votes	%	±%
Conservative	Richard Meller	35,239	57.46	
Labour	Paul Winterton	26,087	42.54	
Majority		9,152	14.92	
Turnout		61,326	66.74	
Conservative hold		Swing		

General election 1931: Mitcham
Party	Candidate	Votes	%	±%
Conservative	Richard Meller	38,948	76.26	
Labour	W Graham	12,124	23.74	
Majority		26,824	52.52	
Turnout		51,072	69.97	
Conservative hold		Swing		

=== 1920s ===
General election 1929: Mitcham
Party	Candidate	Votes	%	±%
Unionist	Richard Meller	20,254	47.9	−14.1
Labour	Skene Mackay	13,057	30.8	−7.2
Liberal	Raymond V. Jones	9,016	21.3	New
Majority		7,197	17.1	−6.9
Turnout		42,327	70.2	−4.6
Registered electors		60,311		
Unionist hold		Swing	−3.5	

General election 1924: Mitcham
Party	Candidate	Votes	%	±%
Unionist	Richard Meller	15,984	62.0	+9.7
Labour	James Chuter Ede	9,776	38.0	−9.7
Majority		6,208	24.0	+19.4
Turnout		25,760	74.8	+11.6
Registered electors		34,435		
Unionist hold		Swing	+9.7	

General election 1923: Mitcham
Party	Candidate	Votes	%	±%
Unionist	Richard Meller	10,829	52.3	−12.7
Labour	James Chuter Ede	9,877	47.7	N/A
Majority		952	4.6	−25.4
Turnout		20,706	63.2	+10.5
Registered electors		32,755		
Unionist hold		Swing	−12.7	

By-election 1923: Mitcham
Party	Candidate	Votes	%	±%
Labour	James Chuter Ede	8,029	38.0	New
Unionist	Arthur Griffith-Boscawen	7,196	34.1	−30.9
Liberal	Ernest Brown	3,214	15.2	−19.8
Independent	J.T. Catterall	2,684	12.7	New
Majority		833	3.9	N/A
Turnout		21,123	66.2	+13.5
Registered electors		31,927		
Labour gain from Unionist		Swing	N/A	

General election 1922: Mitcham
Party	Candidate	Votes	%	±%
Unionist	Thomas Worsfold	10,934	65.0	+4.4
Liberal	A.E. Bennetts	5,898	35.0	−4.4
Majority		5,036	30.0	+8.8
Turnout		16,832	52.7	+9.1
Registered electors		31,927		
Unionist hold		Swing	+4.4	

=== 1910s ===
General election 1918: Mitcham
Party		Candidate	Votes	%	±%
C	Unionist	Thomas Worsfold	7,651	60.6	
	Liberal	Samuel Barrow	4,968	39.4	
Majority			2,683	21.2	
Turnout			12,619	43.6	
Registered electors			28,952		
	Unionist win (new seat)				
C indicates candidate endorsed by the coalition government.
