= Carshalton (constituency) =

Parliamentary constituency in the United Kingdom, 1945–1983

- Former county constituency for the House of Commons
- Boundary of Carshalton in Greater London for the 1974 general election
- County: Surrey (Pre 1965); Greater London (Post 1965)
- Electorate: 67,255 (1979)
- Major settlements: Carshalton

1945–1983
- Seats: one
- Created from: Mitcham
- Replaced by: Carshalton and Wallington

Carshalton was a constituency combining with areas to the south-west, then to the east instead, Carshalton which is a suburb on a long, north–south hillside south of London. The latter form saw it take up an eastern "half" (i.e. one of two divisions) of the London Borough of Sutton. It returned one Member of Parliament (MP) to the House of Commons of the Parliament of the United Kingdom.

It was created for the 1945 general election having been the south-west of "Mitcham" and on shedding Banstead in 1974 it gained what had been the south-east of the Mitcham seat, then was abolished for the 1983 general election, when it was replaced by Carshalton and Wallington, a nearly identical eastern set of 13 wards of its (post-1965) solely related local government area (London Borough).

== Boundaries and boundary changes ==
Dates	Local authority	Maps	Wards
1945–1974	Banstead Urban District; Carshalton Urban District (before 1965); London Borough of Sutton (after 1965)		The Urban Districts of Banstead and Carshalton*
1974–1983	London Borough of Sutton		Beddington North, Beddington South, Carshalton Central, Carshalton North East, Carshalton North West, Carshalton St Helier North, Carshalton St Helier South, Carshalton St Helier West, Carshalton South East, Carshalton South West, Wallington Central, Wallington North, and Wallington South

- Abolished as entities from April 1965, falling into Surrey County Council and the London Borough of Sutton respectively

=== 1945–1974 ===
The constituency was formed entirely from the existing of constituency Mitcham

=== 1974–1983 ===
The wards of Beddington North, Beddington South, Wallington Central, Wallington North, and Wallington South were transferred from the abolished constituency of Mitcham. Banstead was transferred to the constituency of Reigate

=== Summary ===
The first version of the seat extended south from the town of Carshalton into the North Downs. Following the redistribution in the late 1960's the seat lost the rural areas of the North Downs to the south and gained suburban areas to the north-east.

== Members of Parliament ==
Election	Member	Party	Notes
1945	Antony Head	Conservative	In 1960 elevated to the Lords
1960 by-election	Walter Elliot	Conservative	
Feb 1974	Robert Carr	Conservative	Member for Mitcham (1950–1974). In 1976 elevated to the Lords.
1976 by-election	Nigel Forman	Conservative	Contested Carshalton and Wallington following redistribution
1983	constituency renamed: see Carshalton and Wallington		

== Election results ==
=== Elections in the 1940s ===
General election 1945: Carshalton
Party	Candidate	Votes	%
Conservative	Antony Head	20,181	45.3
Labour	William Hawkins	19,164	43.1
Liberal	Wilfrid Barrow	5,167	11.6
Majority		1,017	2.3
Turnout		44,512	77.0
Registered electors		57,838	
Conservative win (new seat)			

=== Elections in the 1950s ===
General election 1950: Carshalton
Party	Candidate	Votes	%	±%
Conservative	Antony Head	29,493	52.5	+7.2
Labour	S Sharman	21,536	38.3	–4.7
Liberal	Dennis Clarke	5,132	9.1	–2.5
Majority		7,957	14.2	+11.9
Turnout		56,161	88.1	+11.2
Registered electors		63,720		
Conservative hold		Swing	+5.9	

General election 1951: Carshalton
Party	Candidate	Votes	%	±%
Conservative	Antony Head	32,634	58.7	+6.2
Labour	Clifford Davies	22,928	41.3	+2.9
Majority		9,706	17.5	+3.3
Turnout		55,562	85.1	–3.0
Registered electors		65,313		
Conservative hold		Swing	+1.7	

General election 1955: Carshalton
Party	Candidate	Votes	%	±%
Conservative	Antony Head	30,429	55.7	–3.0
Labour	Harvey Cole	18,924	34.6	–6.6
Liberal	Jack Browne	5,277	9.7	New
Majority		11,505	21.1	+3.6
Turnout		54,630	80.7	–4.3
Registered electors		67,655		
Conservative hold		Swing	+1.8	

General election 1959: Carshalton
Party	Candidate	Votes	%	±%
Conservative	Antony Head	30,454	54.0	–1.7
Labour	John Powell	17,210	30.5	–4.1
Liberal	Jack Browne	8,744	15.5	+5.8
Majority		13,244	23.5	+2.4
Turnout		56,408	82.4	+1.6
Registered electors		68,469		
Conservative hold		Swing	+1.2	

=== Elections in the 1960s ===
1960 Carshalton by-election
Party	Candidate	Votes	%	±%
Conservative	Walter Elliot	19,175	51.7	–2.3
Liberal	Jack Browne	10,250	27.6	+12.1
Labour	Brian Thomas	7,696	20.7	–9.8
Majority		8,925	24.0	+0.6
Turnout		37,121	54.2	–28.2
Registered electors		68,469		
Conservative hold		Swing	–3.7	

General election 1964: Carshalton
Party	Candidate	Votes	%	±%
Conservative	Walter Elliot	26,118	48.9	–5.1
Labour	Brian Thomas	16,105	30.1	–0.4
Liberal	Jack Browne	11,207	21.0	+5.5
Majority		10,013	18.7	–4.7
Turnout		53,430	80.2	–2.2
Registered electors		66,637		
Conservative hold		Swing	–2.4	

General election 1966: Carshalton
Party	Candidate	Votes	%	±%
Conservative	Walter Elliot	24,615	47.0	–1.9
Labour	Philip Bassett	18,746	35.8	+5.7
Liberal	Jack Browne	8,988	17.2	–3.8
Majority		5,869	11.2	–7.5
Turnout		52,349	79.4	–0.8
Registered electors		65,971		
Conservative hold		Swing	–3.8	

=== Elections in the 1970s ===
General election 1970: Carshalton
Party	Candidate	Votes	%	±%
Conservative	Walter Elliot	27,342	54.0	+7.0
Labour	Gilbert Baker	16,896	33.4	–2.5
Liberal	Jack Browne	6,411	12.7	–4.5
Majority		10,446	20.6	+9.4
Turnout		50,649	71.2	–8.1
Registered electors		71,119		
Conservative hold		Swing	+4.7	

1970 notional result
Party	Vote	%
Conservative	23,100	48.8
Labour	18,200	38.5
Liberal	6,000	12.7
Turnout	47,300	70.4
Electorate	67,173	

General election February 1974: Carshalton
Party	Candidate	Votes	%	±%
Conservative	Robert Carr	24,440	44.5	–4.3
Labour	Peter Walker	18,750	34.2	–4.3
Liberal	Hester Smallbone	11,695	21.3	+8.6
Majority		5,690	10.4	+0.0
Turnout		54,885	82.9	+12.4
Registered electors		66,244		
Conservative hold		Swing	+0.0	

General election October 1974: Carshalton
Party	Candidate	Votes	%	±%
Conservative	Robert Carr	22,538	45.4	+0.9
Labour	Bernard Atherton	18,840	37.9	+3.8
Liberal	Hester Smallbone	8,272	16.7	–4.6
Majority		3,698	7.4	–2.9
Turnout		49,650	74.3	–8.6
Registered electors		66,838		
Conservative hold		Swing	–1.5	

Carshalton by-election 1976
Party	Candidate	Votes	%	±%
Conservative	Nigel Forman	20,753	51.7	+6.3
Labour	Colin Blau	11,021	27.4	–10.5
Liberal	John Hatherley	6,028	15.0	–1.6
National Front	Terry Denville-Faulkner	1,851	4.6	New
Conservative Anti-Common Market	Reginald Simmerson	251	0.6	New
Logic Party	William Dunmore	133	0.3	New
Air, Road, Public Safety, White Resident	Bill Boaks	115	0.3	New
Majority		9,732	24.2	+16.8
Turnout		40,152	60.5	–13.8
Registered electors		66,334		
Conservative hold		Swing	+8.4	

General election 1979: Carshalton
Party	Candidate	Votes	%	±%
Conservative	Nigel Forman	26,492	51.3	+5.9
Labour	Michael Ormerod	16,121	31.2	–6.7
Liberal	John Hatherley	8,112	15.7	–1.0
National Front	Terry Denville-Faulkner	919	1.8	N/A
Majority		10,371	20.1	+12.6
Turnout		51,644	76.8	+2.5
Registered electors		67,255		
Conservative hold		Swing	+6.3	

== See also ==
As to 1945-1965 period: list of parliamentary constituencies in Surrey
