= James Chuter Ede =

British Labour politician (1882–1965)

The Right Honourable The Lord Chuter-Ede CH PC JP DL
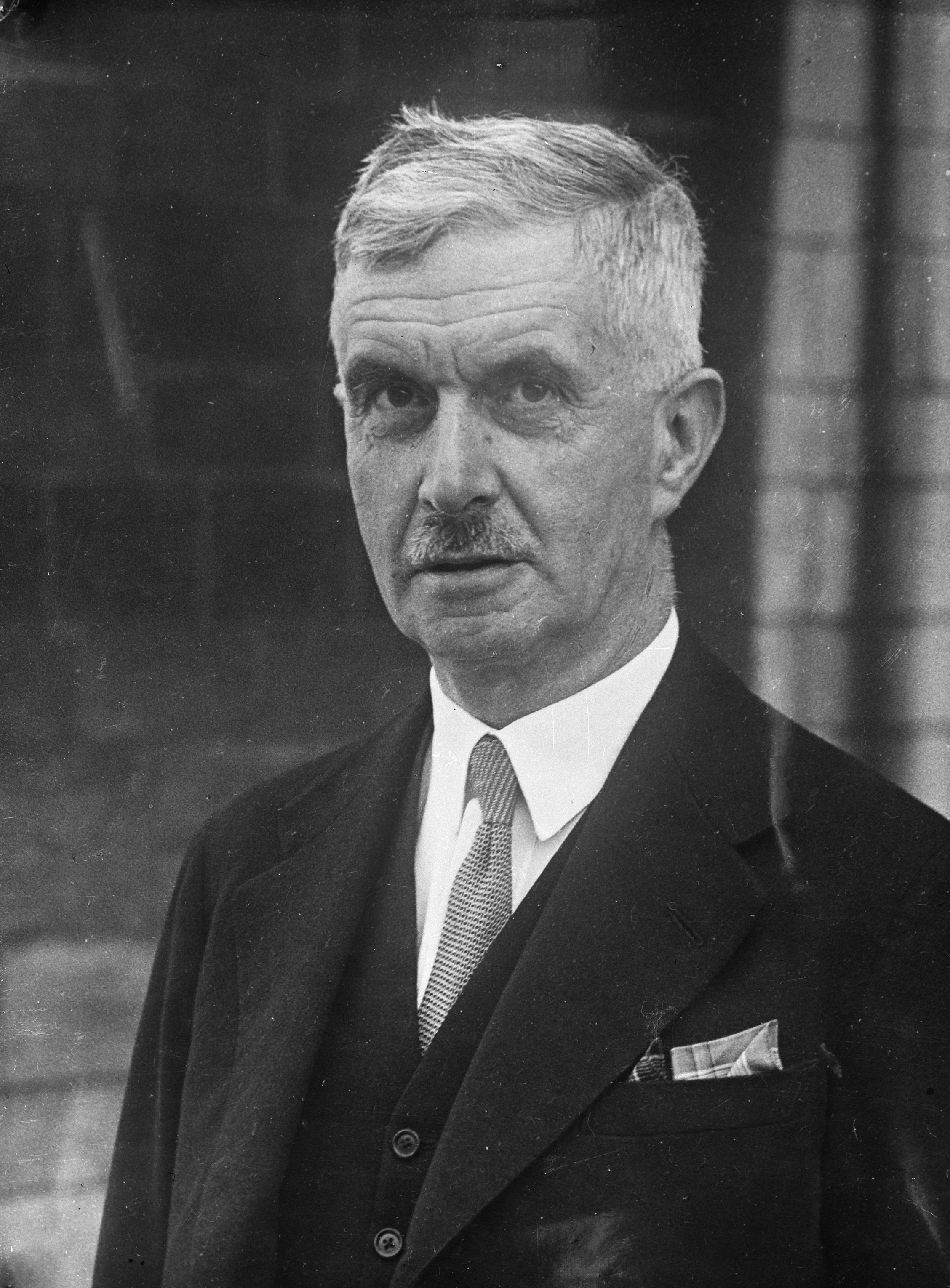
- Ede in 1945

Leader of the House of Commons
- In office 16 March 1951 – 26 October 1951
- Prime Minister: Clement Attlee
- Preceded by: Herbert Morrison
- Succeeded by: Harry Crookshank

Home Secretary
- In office 3 August 1945 – 26 October 1951
- Prime Minister: Clement Attlee
- Preceded by: Sir Donald Somervell
- Succeeded by: Sir David Maxwell Fyfe

Parliamentary Secretary to the Board of Education
- In office 15 May 1940 – 13 August 1944
- President: Herwald Ramsbotham; Rab Butler
- Preceded by: Kenneth Lindsay
- Succeeded by: Office abolished

Parliamentary Secretary to the Ministry of Education
- In office 13 August 1944 – 23 May 1945
- Minister: Rab Butler
- Preceded by: Office created
- Succeeded by: Thelma Cazalet-Keir

Member of Parliament for South Shields
- In office 14 November 1935 – 25 September 1964
- Preceded by: Harcourt Johnstone
- Succeeded by: Arthur Blenkinsop
- In office 30 May 1929 – 6 October 1931
- Preceded by: Edward Harney
- Succeeded by: Harcourt Johnstone

Member of Parliament for Mitcham
- In office 3 March 1923 – 16 November 1923
- Preceded by: Thomas Worsfold
- Succeeded by: Richard James Meller

Personal details
- Born: James Chuter Ede; 11 September 1882 Epsom, Surrey
- Died: 11 November 1965 (aged 83) Ewell, Surrey
- Party: Labour
- Other political affiliations: Liberal
- Spouse: Lilian Williams (m. 1917; died 1948)
- Education: Christ's College, Cambridge

James Chuter Chuter-Ede, Baron Chuter-Ede, CH, PC, JP, DL (né Ede; 11 September 1882 – 11 November 1965), was a British teacher, trade unionist and Labour Party politician. He was a Member of Parliament (MP) for 32 years, and served as the sole Home Secretary under Prime Minister Clement Attlee from 1945 to 1951, becoming the longest-serving Home Secretary of the 20th or 21st century.

== Early life ==
James Chuter Ede was born in Epsom, Surrey, elder son (there were two daughters) of "lower-middle-class" parents, James Ede, a Nonconformist (Unitarian) grocer (who had been an assistant to John Budgen, founder of the Budgens grocery store chain) and his wife Agnes Mary, daughter of local builder James Chuter. He was educated at Epsom National School, Dorking High School for Boys, Battersea Pupil Teachers' Centre, and Christ's College, Cambridge, where he studied natural sciences. He attended Cambridge through a Surrey county scholarship, which did not cover his living expenses, and he ran out of funds at university, dropping out without a degree at the end of his second year. In April and May 1943, Ede's ministerial boss Rab Butler arranged for him to receive an honorary MA from Cambridge. Either through his family background or by a decision made when a student, he became a Unitarian, and his religion consumed much of his time and effort later in life.

Had he graduated from Cambridge, Ede might have pursued a career as a science master in the grammar or public school systems, but instead he became an assistant master at council elementary schools in Surrey from 1905 to 1914, mainly in Mortlake. He took an active part in the Surrey County Teachers’ Association (SCTA), part of the National Union of Teachers. He was active in the Liberal Party, and in 1908 was elected as a member of Epsom Urban District Council, as the youngest councillor in Surrey, and probably the youngest urban district councillor in the country. In 1914, Ede stood for election to Surrey County Council and, as a council employee, had to resign his teaching post before the poll. He was elected, and never worked as a teacher again.

Much of his council work concentrated on education, as the SCTA wanted teacher representation on the Education Committee, to which, after a struggle, he was appointed. During the First World War he served in the East Surrey Regiment and Royal Engineers, reaching the rank of Acting Regimental Sergeant Major. He spent most of the War in France, probably working with poison gas.

== Early political career ==
During the war, Ede joined the Labour Party, having been critical for some time of senior Liberal figures and of wartime establishment attitudes, and believing Labour better represented working people. He was selected as Labour candidate for Epsom in 1918, but was soundly defeated by a candidate who had been given the "Coalition Coupon". He was appointed assistant secretary of the SCTA, which provided some Union sponsorship for his county council work. He retained this post until he became a Government minister, and he gradually took over running the Association, as well as dominating education policy in Surrey, a county where population increases brought about the need for much new school building.

Ede chaired Epsom UDC in 1920. Ede was first elected to the House of Commons as Member of Parliament (MP) for Mitcham, at a by-election in March 1923, which caused a considerable stir in the media. However, he lost the seat in December at the 1923 general election, and was defeated there again in 1924.

Ede eventually left Epsom UDC in 1927, having lived for some years in Mitcham. He returned to Parliament at the 1929 general election, for the Tyneside seat of South Shields. In the short-lived Labour government of 1929–31, Ede was appointed in 1930 to chair a government committee on educational standards in private schools. This reported in 1932, and Ede gradually became the Labour Party's main specialist in the field of education, following the retirement from active politics of Charles Trevelyan, whose encouragement Ede had received, including through this appointment.

Ede had again lost his seat in Parliament at the 1931 election. He rejoined Epsom UDC (by now Epsom and Ewell UDC) in 1933, and chaired Surrey CC the same year. In 1934 Ede became chairman of the London and Home Counties Joint Electricity Authority, of which he had been a member since 1928. He held this post until 1940.

Ede was re-elected to Parliament for South Shields at the 1935 general election, and held the seat until his retirement from the Commons at the 1964 general election. When Epsom and Ewell were awarded borough status in 1937, he was chosen as the "Charter Mayor", and led the activities celebrating the new Borough’s charter. He was appointed a deputy lieutenant for the county of Surrey. Ede also became chairman of the British Electrical Development Association in 1937.

Ede showed great interest in the sciences and the uses to which they could be put, being also a keen photographer. He also contributed greatly to environmental protection in Surrey, encouraging extension of green belt, the purchase of property to prevent development, and building bypasses to restrict traffic in town centres.

== Education Minister ==
In the wartime coalition, Ede was appointed on 15 May 1940 to junior ministerial office as Parliamentary Secretary to the Board of Education, and served under two Conservative Presidents, first Herwald Ramsbotham, and then Rab Butler. Ede was a very safe pair of hands and his background complemented that of Butler, who was a practising Anglican, privately educated and from a well-to-do family, and who initially had little knowledge of state elementary schools. Ede was also a useful link between Butler and the Labour leaders Attlee, Arthur Greenwood and Ernest Bevin. (Ede was also governor of a Jesuit School, although that was less helpful.) Both men also gained a reputation for integrity. There remained considerable cross-party respect between Ede and Butler during their various later political activities.

He adopted the work initiated by the Board’s civil servants under Sir Maurice Holmes to reform education. On 4 February 1942 Ede, who had already grown to respect Butler, declined a request that he move to the Ministry of War Transport, although he would have obeyed a “direct order” from Churchill. Churchill deferred to Attlee’s wish to keep Ede in place.

Much of the time of ministers and officials was taken up in negotiating with the Protestant Churches, with the Church of England wanting greater control of religious education in state schools in return for the absorption of Anglican schools into the state system. The Church of England had been relatively sympathetic to Herwald Ramsbotham's Green Book (June 1941), which had proposed permitting denominational teaching - which would in practice have been mostly Anglican - in state schools to children over the age of 11, lifting the ban which had been in place since the Cowper-Temple Clause of the 1870 Forster Act. Although agreement was eventually reached, a brief delay was caused by Ede's "White Memorandum" of March 1942, published just before Easter. This reflected nonconformist lobbying since the Green Book, and Ede’s views and those of his officials. Anglicans, who had much support among Conservative MPs, were not pleased with the "White Memorandum" proposal for compulsory transfer of schools in "single school areas" (areas, mainly rural, where the Anglican school, often built by the local squire, was the only school) to LEA control, a move which tended to be favoured by nonconformists and teaching unions.

Ministers and officials had less success negotiating with the Roman Catholic Church, who wanted to retain complete autonomy in their schools while receiving 100% state subsidy for infrastructure (rather than the 50% on offer for Voluntary Aided, i.e. semi-autonomous, schools). On one occasion (exact date not given by Butler's biographers but probably in 1942-3), Butler and Ede drove to the Northern Bishops' conference at Ushaw College, near Hexham. They were given dinner and shown the chapel but were given no concessions.

Along with Butler, Ede published a formal white paper on planned education reform (July 1943). This covered several areas, including raising the school-leaving age to 15 or 16, enshrining the separation of elementary and secondary schooling from age 11 (as opposed to the existing overlap since the school leaving age had been raised to 14 in 1918), whether there should be separate schools for pupils with different aptitudes (favoured by education doctrine at the time, although in the event the choice was not prescribed in the 1944 Act but was left a matter of local option), how to assimilate public schools into the system (the Fleming Report would recommend that public school places be made open to state scholarships, although this was never implemented), and the ‘dual system’ of state and religious schools in the public sector.

With Butler, Ede steered the Education Act 1944 through Parliament, and it is clear that his detailed knowledge of state education, which Butler lacked, was crucial to the success of this measure. At the Second Reading of the bill in March 1944, Thelma Cazalet-Keir proposed two amendments, to raise the school leaving age to 16 by 1951 and demanding equal pay for women teachers, which were passed by 117-116 on 29 March 1944, the only time the Coalition suffered a significant defeat in a division. Butler, who thought it wrong to dictate to the teaching profession, stormed out of the Chamber and was rumoured to be about to resign. Ernest Bevin and Ede threatened to resign if Butler was forced out, and Churchill made the amendment a matter of confidence and ensured its defeat by 425-23 on 30 March. This was one of the events which made Churchill and the Conservatives appear reactionary, contributing to their election defeat in 1945.

The Act set the school-leaving age at 15 with effect from April 1947, with the long-term aim of raising it to 16, and made secondary education free, abolishing the term "elementary school". It established nursery schools and classes, along with provision for children needing special educational treatment. It provided for further education, medical treatment in schools, school meals and milk, and social, religious and physical education. Independent schools were put under a programme of inspection, a compulsory act of worship introduced, and the rôle and requirements of local education authorities made clear.

== Home Secretary and later career ==
Although he had expected to be appointed Minister of Education following the post-war Labour victory, Ede was appointed Home Secretary in the 1945 Labour government of Clement Attlee, and remained in that post throughout. He was concurrently Leader of the House of Commons in 1951. He was responsible for restructuring several public services, through the Police Act 1946, the Fire Services Act 1947, the Civil Defence Act 1948, and the Justices of the Peace Act 1949. In addition, he was closely involved in the Children Act 1948, the British Nationality Act 1948, the Representation of the People Act 1948, and the Criminal Justice Act 1948. He used his experience in local government and education to decide the right level of local authority control for services he reconstituted – the Fire Service, Civil Defence and the police, which he organised into a more professional force, with training centres developing consistent standards. Inheriting child care services and magistrates’ courts operating piecemeal throughout the country, his reforms set up consistent procedures and practices.

Changes to the electoral system in the Representation of the People Act finally established the principle of "one person, one vote" and single-member constituencies, for which in Ede's view there had been pressure from the time of the Civil War and through the era of Chartism to his own period. He abolished university seats, along with the business vote, two-member constituencies and the privileged electoral status of the City of London.

The British Nationality Act established the single status of "Citizen of the United Kingdom and Colonies", without regard to race or colour, so that all citizens of the UK and its colonies (there were few independent Commonwealth members at the time) continued to be equally able to live and work in the UK.

The Criminal Justice Act abolished the sentences of hard labour, penal servitude and whipping, and established new arrangements for probation and the treatment of young offenders. It also ended the right of peers to be tried by the House of Lords. Attempts to amend it to abolish capital punishment were unsuccessful (see below).

Ede established the Lynskey tribunal under Sir George Lynskey in 1948 to investigate allegations of corruption among ministers and civil servants. Changes he also brought about included ending the tradition that the Home Secretary attends royal births, which started following the rumours that James II’s son was an impostor, smuggled into the royal birth chamber. Ede helped change the date of the Grand National horse race to a Saturday, and proposed that Remembrance Sunday be moved to a date in the summer, reflecting the different days on which the World Wars ended (this was not taken up). He arranged the naturalisation of Prince Philip, Duke of Edinburgh, and was involved in the choice of Mountbatten as his British surname.

Ede ceased to be in government when Labour lost the 1951 United Kingdom general election, and pursued other interests during his remaining 13 years in opposition. As well as his British Museum work, he became an active member of the BBC's General Advisory Council, and held a leading role in the Unitarian Church. In 1964 he left the Commons and was created a life peer as Baron Chuter-Ede, of Epsom in the County of Surrey, on 1 January 1965, having accordingly adopted the surname Chuter-Ede on 18 December 1964.

== Unitarian Church ==
When Home Secretary, Ede expanded his activities in the Unitarian Church, addressing its General Assembly in 1947, and arranging for the church to be represented at the Cenotaph on Remembrance Sunday. He also spoke to various Unitarian congregations, and increased this activity after he left office in 1951. He attended congresses of the International Association for Liberal Christianity and Religious Freedom (IARF), and in 1955 was elected its President. In that connection, he paid more than one visit to North America.

From 1957 to 1958, Ede was President of the Unitarian General Assembly, and for a year he travelled tirelessly around the country, addressing different congregations.

== Capital punishment ==
In 1938, Ede voted for a motion in favour of abolishing the death penalty for murder. This did not result in any change in the law but, when he was Home Secretary, his own Criminal Justice Bill in 1948 was successfully amended by MPs who wished to abolish hanging. However, by this time Ede, in line with the policy of the Attlee Government, opposed the reform. A person sentenced to hang was entitled to appeal to the Monarch for mercy, so in practice the Home Secretary, to whom the task was delegated, decided whether each execution should proceed. For a while he agreed to commute every death sentence to life imprisonment, but the House of Lords then rejected the amendment, and the Criminal Justice Act 1948 did not abolish capital punishment. He permitted hangings to continue.

In 1950 Timothy Evans was convicted of murdering his own daughter, and Ede approved his death sentence. In 1953, after John Christie had been convicted and hanged for a murder committed in the same house (and it was clear he had committed several others), Ede eventually concluded that he had made the wrong decision in regard to Evans.

He took part in the campaign for a pardon for Evans, and ended his career supporting the cause of abolition. In November 1965, capital punishment for murder was abolished by the Murder (Abolition of Death Penalty) Act 1965, and Evans's body was transferred to consecrated ground, shortly before Ede's death. His campaign was described as "the last struggle of a liberal nonconformist of the old school".

== Family ==
Ede married Lilian Mary, daughter of Richard Williams, in 1917. They had no children, and she died in 1948, having been ill for some years. Lord Chuter-Ede survived her by 17 years and died at Ewell, Surrey, in November 1965, aged 83.

== Memorials ==
Chuter Ede Education Centre in South Shields is named after him. It was formerly a comprehensive school. There are also a ward in Epsom Hospital and a primary school near Newark-on-Trent which bear his name. The Labour Party headquarters in South Shields is at Ede House, opened and named shortly before he ceased to be its MP. Chuter Ede Education Centre was demolished in 2024 with plans to re-develop the site.

Ede left twelve volumes of diaries, now residing in the British Library. The diaries (largely neither transcribed nor published) give an account of his wartime activities from 1941 to 1945 in great detail, as well as shorter memoirs from his time as Home Secretary, which illustrate the wide range of duties and concerns which went with that office in the mid-20th century. At the suggestion of an historian who used them, with his permission, in her research, he left most of them to the British Museum, of which he became a trustee – initially ex officio as Home Secretary, and then in his own right when he lost office.

== See also ==
- List of Unitarians, Universalists, and Unitarian Universalists
- Home Secretary

== Books ==
- Barber, Michael The Making of the 1944 Education Act, Cassell 1994 ISBN 0-304-32661-5
- Howard, Anthony RAB: The Life of R. A. Butler, Jonathan Cape 1987 ISBN 978-0-224-01862-3 excerpt
- Jago, Michael Rab Butler: The Best Prime Minister We Never Had?, Biteback Publishing 2015 ISBN 978-1849549202

Parliament of the United Kingdom
Preceded by Thomas Worsfold	Member of Parliament for Mitcham; 1923–1923	Succeeded by Sir Richard Meller
Preceded by Edward Harney	Member of Parliament for South Shields; 1929–1931	Succeeded by Harcourt Johnstone
Preceded by Harcourt Johnstone	Member of Parliament for South Shields; 1935–1964	Succeeded by Arthur Blenkinsop
Political offices
Preceded by Sir Donald Somervell	Home Secretary; 1945–1951	Succeeded by Sir David Maxwell Fyfe
Preceded by Herbert Morrison	Leader of the House of Commons; 1951	Succeeded by Harry Crookshank
