= Nigel Forman =

British politician (1943–2017)

Member of Parliament for Carshalton and Wallington (Carshalton 1976-1983)
- In office 11 March 1976 – 8 April 1997
- Preceded by: Robert Carr
- Succeeded by: Tom Brake

Personal details
- Born: Francis Nigel Forman; 25 March 1943 Simla, India
- Died: 11 May 2017 (aged 74) United Kingdom
- Party: Conservative
- Spouse: Susan
- Occupation: Academic

Francis Nigel Forman (25 March 1943 – 11 May 2017) was a British Conservative politician. After working in the Conservative Research Department from 1968 to 1976 he was elected as an MP. He became a junior minister, Minister of Higher Education, in April 1992, but resigned from that office after 8 months.

Forman lost his Parliamentary seat in the 1997 general election. He later worked as a lecturer, academic writer and Parliamentary expert/instructor. He was married to Susan Forman in 1971. The couple had no children.

== Early career ==
Forman was born in Simla, India where his father served as a brigadier in the Indian Army. Forman was educated at the Dragon School, Shrewsbury School, New College, Oxford, College of Europe (Bruges), Harvard and Sussex University. He obtained various degrees from the latter four including a Master of Public Administration from Harvard, a Certificate of Advanced European Studies (equivalent to a master's degree) from the College of Europe (class of 1965–66) and a Ph.D. from Sussex University. In his Times obituary he was described as "something of a perpetual student". His first significant job was from 1967 to 1968 as an information officer at the Confederation of British Industry.

In 1968 he joined the Conservative Research Department ('CRD' – the research operation of the party) and began the quest to find himself a seat in Parliament. He progressed rapidly in the CRD, acting as ‘external affairs adviser’ to Official Opposition leader Edward Heath. He served Margaret Thatcher in the same capacity from 1975 to 1976. He was promoted to Assistant Director with special responsibility for European affairs.

He contested the Coventry North East seat as a member of the party in the February 1974 contest but was not elected. After the elevation of Robert Carr to the peerage in 1976, Forman was centrally recommended and selected as his replacement for the resultant by-election.

== Backbench MP ==
Forman was elected to the House of Commons as Member of Parliament (MP) for Carshalton at its by-election on 11 March 1976. He took the seat with a 10,000 majority over Labour, compared with Carr's 4,000 majority in October 1974. When the seat's boundaries were revised for the 1983 election it was renamed Carshalton and Wallington.

The seat, the eastern half of the London Borough of Sutton, was socially mixed. In 1976 it had much social housing yet had streets of expensive detached houses and many middle class voters. All three major parties (Conservative, Labour and Liberal) had entrenched support and Forman's lead looked vulnerable to tactical voting. The local Conservative leaders of the Council soon showed themselves to be resistant to concepts of modernisation that Forman espoused. Sutton was one of the few remaining councils in the UK that kept selective education and council meetings were unusual in that Conservative councillors wore ceremonial robes to "give dignity" to them.

Forman soon established himself as a bright and enthusiastic MP. During his first three months in the House he asked 64 formal questions of Ministers in the Labour government. His particular interests were nuclear power, incomes policy, education policy and ministerial patronage. After the Conservatives returned to government in 1979, it was widely expected that Forman would soon obtain ministerial office. He served as Parliamentary Private Secretary (PPS) first to Lord Carrington in the Foreign Office and later to Douglas Hurd in the Home Office.

Forman soon became known as a moderate Conservative who differed with some of Thatcher's policies. In 1980 he spoke for greatly increasing child benefits and James Prior’s attempt to have member votes bind trade unions through their voluntary agreement to do so. That year he was in the majorities who opposed reintroducing capital punishment and limiting abortion rights. He also expressed alarm at mounting unemployment arising from the government’s economic and financial policies. He frequently called for a "one nation" approach in his speeches and writings. He disapproved of government policies which promoted London-bound internal migration and were socially divisive. He favoured closer integration of Britain with the European Union.

In February 1981, Labour MPs cheered him in the House when he asked the Chancellor (Howe) to act to halt the rise in unemployment. Forman advocated employment and economic policies which were broadly consistent with those pursued by the Callaghan ministry. He was seen as a Conservative opponent of Thatcherism. All this raised his profile in the House but it did not enhance his promotion prospects. In a 1983 Times piece senior Labour MP Gerald Kaufman noted that Forman had been overlooked for promotion and that his obvious abilities were not being used.

In 1984 Forman stood for chairman of the Conservative backbench finance committee, as a moderate "one nation" Tory – against incumbent right-winger Sir William Clark. Forman lost but had become clearly identified with "wets" and the one-nation group of Tory MPs. In 1985, Forman published a pamphlet Work to be done : employment policy for 1985 and beyond. This was deeply critical of government policy and advocated a package of measures to stimulate employment.

Forman's progressive views did not endear him to his party's leaders in his local Council and association. Many of them regarded him as disloyal to Margaret Thatcher and a traitor. There were repeated attempts to deselect him. Matters came to a head in 1986 after the Liberal-SDP Alliance gained political control of the Council. Forman publicly attributed this to the shortcomings of the local Conservative leadership.

The matter is described in the following extract from an article in The Times on 21 May 1987:

“The Carshalton Conservative Association suffers from bigots and zealots who indulge in internecine warfare.” Not Labour smear tactics, nor Alliance innuendo, but the words of its Conservative MP, Mr Nigel Forman. Several attempts to deselect Mr Forman failed. But when the election was called last week, five of the seven senior officers took their revenge on the beleaguered MP by resigning. – The Times, May 1987.

However, Forman comfortably held his seat in the 1987 general election. His advocacy of redistributive but market-led policies was coupled with lack of a clear single Labour or Liberal/SDP opponent. This made Forman an acceptable candidate to many local voters who refrained from tactical voting to oust him. Forman won 54% of the vote, on high turnout, His political fortunes seemed to be in the ascendant.

“Has Chancellor Nigel Lawson gone soft? Yesterday he appointed as his PPS a Tory so wet he drips. As recently as last year, Nigel Forman, vice-chairman of the party's backbench finance committee, was publicly calling on the Chancellor to 'give top priority to the unemployment challenge'. The year before, in Mastering British Politics, he wrote: 'Occasionally, in the course of its long history, the Conservative party has been swept along on the wave of some particular ideology, but such periods have not usually lasted or brought enduring political success'.” – "Rising Damp", The Times, June 1987.

The ideology Forman referred to was the then fashionable combination of supply side economics, monetarism, deregulation and privatisation known in the 1980s as Thatcherism. After Mrs Thatcher was forced from office in late 1990 it was considered only a matter of time before Forman would be promoted.

== Later Parliamentary career ==
“The omission of Nigel Forman, from successive ministerial reshuffles over the past few years has surprised many at Westminster when several apparently less talented politicians have secured top posts. But after 16 years in the Commons, he has become an under-secretary at the education department”

Immediately after the general election in April 1992 Forman was appointed Under Secretary of State for Education (with the job title Minister of Higher and Further Education) under Education Secretary John Patten. During his tenure of office, Forman dealt with high-profile issues such as the financing of student unions, student loans and the quality assurance of degrees issued by the new universities. Forman unexpectedly resigned from his ministerial post on 11 December 1992 for "personal reasons". The nature of those personal reasons was never disclosed. Colleagues commented that Forman was "a very private man" and nobody claimed to know why he had resigned.

Thereafter, Forman's political career went into decline. His political interests appeared to become more theoretical in nature. In January 1996 the Demos 'think tank' published a paper written by him on reform of the income tax system. Demos was generally considered to be closely associated with New Labour. At the 1997 general election, Forman lost his seat to the Liberal Democrat candidate Tom Brake. Forman's 10,000 vote majority in the 1992 general election was converted into a 2,000 vote Liberal Democrat majority with a 12% swing from Conservative to Lib Dem.

== After Parliament ==
Forman initially developed a portfolio of lecturing and writing work. In 1999 he joined the faculty of Wroxton College, the UK (Oxfordshire) campus of Fairleigh Dickinson University (FDU).

Forman delivered courses for ‘Westminster Explained’, Parliament's own in-house training facility which provides courses to members of both Houses and the wider public service. He was a visiting lecturer at Essex University and an honorary research fellow at University College London.

Forman died of dementia-related issues on 11 May 2017. In the last year of his life he was reported to have been dismayed by the result of the 2016 Brexit referendum and to have stated that the UK had become a country he hardly knew. However, obituarists drew attention to his comment (quoted above) published thirty years earlier concerning the tendency of the Conservative party to be occasionally swept along in particular ideologies.

== Bibliography ==
His later, most notable, publications were:

- Constitutional Change in the UK (2004)
- Mastering British Politics (co-editor)
- Mastering British Politics (with N. D. J. Baldwin)

== Notes and references ==
Footnotes

Parliament of the United Kingdom
Preceded by Robert Carr	Member of Parliament for Carshalton; 1976–1983	constituency abolished
New constituency	Member of Parliament for Carshalton and Wallington; 1983–1997	Succeeded by Tom Brake
