= 1960 Carshalton by-election =

UK Parliamentary by-election

The 1960 Carshalton by-election was held on 16 November 1960 when the incumbent Conservative MP, Antony Head, was elevated to the peerage on appointment as British High Commissioner to Nigeria. It was retained by the Conservative candidate Walter Elliot.

Carshalton by-election, 1960
Party	Candidate	Votes	%	±%
Conservative	Walter Elliot	19,175	51.66	−2.33
Liberal	Jack Henry Gordon Browne	10,250	27.61	+12.11
Labour	Brian Thomas	7,696	20.73	−9.78
Majority		8,925	24.04	+0.56
Turnout		37,121	54.2	−28.2
Conservative hold		Swing	-3.7	
