= Antony Head, 1st Viscount Head =

British soldier, politician and diplomat

The Right Honourable The Viscount Head GCMG CBE MC PC

Secretary of State for War
- In office 31 October 1951 – 18 October 1956
- Monarchs: George VI; Elizabeth II
- Prime Minister: Winston Churchill; Anthony Eden
- Preceded by: John Strachey
- Succeeded by: John Hare

Minister of Defence
- In office 18 October 1956 – 9 January 1957
- Monarch: Elizabeth II
- Prime Minister: Sir Anthony Eden
- Preceded by: Walter Monckton
- Succeeded by: Duncan Sandys

Personal details
- Born: Antony Henry Head; 19 December 1906 London, England
- Died: 29 March 1983 (aged 76) Bishopstone, Salisbury, England
- Party: Conservative
- Spouse: Lady Dorothea Ashley-Cooper
- Education: Royal Military College, Sandhurst

Antony Henry Head, 1st Viscount Head, (19 December 1906 – 29 March 1983) was a British soldier, Conservative politician and diplomat.

== Background and education ==
Head was born in London on 19 December 1906, the son of Geoffrey Head and Ethel Daisy, daughter of Arthur Flower. He was educated at Ludgrove School, Eton and the Royal Military College, Sandhurst.

== Military career ==
A career soldier, Head was commissioned a second lieutenant in the 15th/19th The King's Royal Hussars on 30 August 1926. He later joined the Life Guards, serving through the Second World War and achieving the rank of brigadier. He was awarded the Military Cross (MC) on 20 December 1940. He was part of the British delegation to the Potsdam Conference.

== Political career ==
Head was elected Conservative MP for Carshalton in 1945. He served as Secretary of State for War from 1951 to 1956 and as Minister of Defence (with a seat in the cabinet) from 1956 to 1957, in the administrations of Winston Churchill and Anthony Eden. He was sworn of the Privy Council in 1951 and in 1960 he was raised to the peerage as Viscount Head, of Throope in the County of Wiltshire.

He was later High Commissioner to Nigeria from 1960 to 1963 and High Commissioner to Malaysia from 1963 to 1966, where he unsuccessfully attempted to negotiate Singapore's continued status as part of Malaysia. In line with British foreign policy, he advocated for a peaceful and constitutional solution to the tensions between Malaysia and Singapore according to Singaporean leader Lee Kuan Yew. He was knighted as a Knight Commander of the Order of St Michael and St George (KCMG) in the 1961 New Year Honours and promoted to be Knight Grand Cross (GCMG) in 1963.

== Family ==
Head married Dorothea Louise (1907–1987), daughter of Anthony Ashley-Cooper, 9th Earl of Shaftesbury, on 23 July 1935. They had four children. Head lived at Throope Manor in Bishopstone, Salisbury, and died there on 29 March 1983, aged 76. He was succeeded in the viscountcy by his eldest son, Richard Antony Head, 2nd Viscount Head.

== Arms ==
Coat of arms of Antony Head, 1st Viscount Head
Crest A unicorn's head couped Sable armed and crined Or between two arrows erect points downward of the last. Escutcheon Sable a chevron Argent between two unicorns' heads couped in chief and in base as many arrows in saltire and filed by a ducal crown Or. Supporters On either side a Staffordshire terrier Sable gorged with a dog collar Or. Motto Study Quiet

Parliament of the United Kingdom
New constituency	Member of Parliament for Carshalton; 1945–1960	Succeeded by Walter Elliot
Diplomatic posts
Preceded by None	High Commissioner to Nigeria; 1960–1963	Succeeded by Sir Francis Cumming-Bruce
Preceded by Sir Geofroy Tory	British High Commissioner to Malaysia; 1963–1966	Succeeded by Sir Michael Walker
Political offices
Preceded by John Strachey	Secretary of State for War; 1951–1956	Succeeded by John Hare
Preceded by Walter Monckton	Minister of Defence; 1956–1957	Succeeded by Duncan Sandys
Peerage of the United Kingdom
New creation	Viscount Head; 1960–1983	Succeeded by Richard Head
