= 1923 Mitcham by-election =

UK Parliamentary by-election

← 1922	3 March 1923	1923 →

Candidate	Chuter Ede	Boscawen	Brown
Party	Labour	Unionist	Liberal
Popular vote	8,029	7,196	3,214
Percentage	38.0%	34.1%	15.2%
MP before election
Worsfold
Unionist
Subsequent MP
Meller
Unionist

The 1923 Mitcham by-election was held on 3 March 1923. The by-election was held due to the resignation of the incumbent Conservative MP, Thomas Worsfold. It was won by the Labour candidate James Chuter Ede.

== Result ==
By-election 1923: Mitcham
Party	Candidate	Votes	%	±%
Labour	James Chuter Ede	8,029	38.0	New
Unionist	Arthur Griffith-Boscawen	7,196	34.1	−30.9
Liberal	Ernest Brown	3,214	15.2	−19.8
Independent	J. T. Catterall	2,684	12.7	New
Majority		833	3.9	N/A
Turnout		21,123	66.2	+13.5
Registered electors		31,927		
Labour gain from Unionist		Swing		
