= Robert Carr =

British politician (1916–2012)

The Right Honourable The Lord Carr of Hadley PC
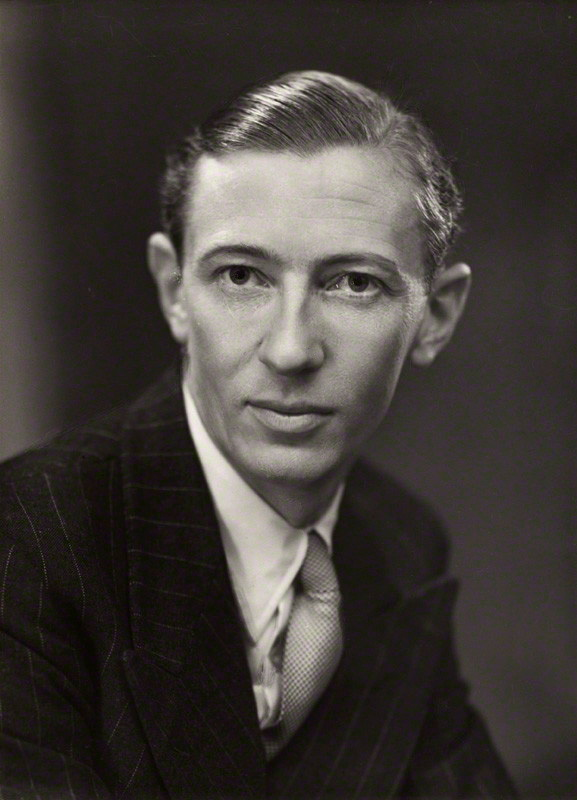
- Carr in 1951

Shadow Chancellor of the Exchequer
- In office 4 March 1974 – 11 February 1975
- Leader: Edward Heath
- Preceded by: Denis Healey
- Succeeded by: Geoffrey Howe

Home Secretary
- In office 18 July 1972 – 4 March 1974
- Prime Minister: Edward Heath
- Preceded by: Reginald Maudling
- Succeeded by: Roy Jenkins
Other ministerial offices
Lord President of the Council; Leader of the House of Commons
In office 7 April 1972 – 5 November 1972
Prime Minister	Edward Heath
Preceded by	William Whitelaw
Succeeded by	Jim Prior
Secretary of State for Employment
In office 20 June 1970 – 7 April 1972
Prime Minister	Edward Heath
Preceded by	Barbara Castle
Succeeded by	Maurice Macmillan
Parliamentary representation
Member of Parliament for Carshalton
In office 28 February 1974 – 15 January 1976
Preceded by	Walter Elliot
Succeeded by	Nigel Forman
Member of Parliament for Mitcham
In office 23 February 1950 – 8 February 1974
Preceded by	Tom Braddock
Succeeded by	Constituency abolished
Member of the House of Lords
Lord Temporal
Life peerage 15 January 1976 – 17 February 2012

Personal details
- Born: Leonard Robert Carr; 11 November 1916 North Finchley, Middlesex, England
- Died: 17 February 2012 (aged 95) Alderley Edge, Cheshire, England
- Party: Conservative
- Spouse: Joan Twining (m. 1943)
- Children: 3
- Education: Westminster School
- Alma mater: Gonville and Caius College, Cambridge

Leonard Robert Carr, Baron Carr of Hadley, PC (11 November 1916 – 17 February 2012) was a British Conservative Party politician who served as Home Secretary from 1972 to 1974. He served as a Member of Parliament (MP) for 26 years, and later served in the House of Lords as a life peer.

== Background ==
Leonard Robert Carr was born in North Finchley on 11 November 1916. He was educated at Westminster School and Gonville and Caius College, Cambridge, where he read Natural Sciences, graduating in 1938. After graduation he applied his knowledge of metallurgy at John Dale & Co, the family metal engineering firm. A collapsed lung kept him from war service but his firm specialised in the construction of airframes for Lancaster bombers.

In 1943, Carr married Joan Twining, and they had a son and two daughters. Their son, David, died in a traffic accident in 1965.

== Political career ==
Carr first sought the Conservative nomination in Barnet ahead of the 1950 election, but lost to Reginald Maudling. He was instead elected Member of Parliament for Mitcham in 1950 and served there until February 1974, when the seat was merged and he moved to Carshalton. He was a Parliamentary Private Secretary (PPS) to Anthony Eden from 1951 to 1955, and then a PPS at the Ministry of Labour under Iain Macleod after Eden became prime minister.

Carr was a supporter of the European Economic Community, and was amiable to Edward Heath's election as Conservative Party leader in 1965, even though he had supported Maudling, despite Maudling having earlier defeated Carr for the Barnet nomination. When Heath became prime minister after the election of 1970, Carr served as Secretary of State for Employment and was responsible for the modernising Industrial Relations Act 1971, which balanced the introduction of compensation for unfair dismissal with curbs on the freedom to strike and the virtual abolition of closed shop agreements. The Industrial Relations Act 1971 was deeply disliked by trade unions, whose industrial action lead to the three-day week and ultimately to the defeat of the Heath government. The victorious Labour Party promptly repealed the Industrial Relations Act and replaced it with the Trade Union and Labour Relations Act 1974, which scrapped the "offensive" provisions but effectively re-enacted the remainder of Carr's 1971 Act.

In 1971, Carr escaped injury when The Angry Brigade anarchist group exploded two bombs outside his house. More than thirty years later, a member of the group issued a public apology to Carr and sent him a Christmas card.

In 1972, Carr served a brief period as Lord President of the Council and then was appointed Home Secretary following Reginald Maudling's resignation. Following Heath's defeat in the first ballot of the 1975 Conservative leadership contest, he asked Carr to "take over the functions of leader" until a new leader was elected. The day after her election the new leader, Margaret Thatcher met with Carr, according to her at his request, before she formed the shadow cabinet. According to her memoirs, Carr had been close to Heath and so she would have understood "if he did not relish the prospect of serving under" her. She stated that Carr made it clear that the only post that he would accept would be that of Shadow Foreign Secretary. She told him that she could not promise that and confided in her memoirs that at that stage, she was still considering appointments and was "not convinced" that she would offer Carr any role in the shadow cabinet. She proceeded to appoint Maudling as Shadow Foreign Secretary and saw Carr again later to inform him of her decision. In her memoirs, she speculated that Carr might have been "persuaded to stay in another capacity" but did not offer him the chance and stated, "I was not keen to have another strong opponent in any position on the team".

In 1975, Carr co-founded the Tory Reform Group.

== Later life ==
Carr was created a life peer as Baron Carr of Hadley, of Monken Hadley in Greater London, in 1976. He served on the board for a number of companies, including Cadbury Schweppes, Prudential Assurance (which he chaired from 1980 to 1985), and Securicor. From 1985 to 1986, he was president of the Surrey County Cricket Club.

Carr died from bronchopneumonia at a nursing home in Alderley Edge, Cheshire, 17 February 2012, at the age of 95. His body was buried in the graveyard of St. Peter's Church in Farmington, Gloucestershire. He was survived by his wife, Joan, and two daughters.

== Bibliography ==
- Leigh Rayment's Historical List of MPs

Parliament of the United Kingdom
Preceded by Tom Braddock	Member of Parliament for Mitcham; 1950–1974	Constituency abolished
Preceded by Walter Elliot	Member of Parliament for Carshalton; 1974–1976	Succeeded by Nigel Forman
Political offices
Preceded by Barbara Castle as Secretary of State for Employment and Productivity	Secretary of State for Employment; 1970–1972	Succeeded by Maurice Macmillan
Preceded by William Whitelaw	Lord President of the Council; 1972	Succeeded by Jim Prior
Preceded by William Whitelaw	Leader of the House of Commons; 1972	Succeeded by Jim Prior
Preceded by Reginald Maudling	Home Secretary; 1972–1974	Succeeded by Roy Jenkins
