= Richard Meller =

British politician (1872-1940)

Sir Richard James Meller (1872 - 23 June 1940) was a British barrister and Conservative politician.

He was born in London, the son of Richard Meller. He was called to the bar at the Middle Temple in 1904, and became an expert in insurance law. In 1912 he was appointed by the government to the post of official lecturer on National Health Insurance. He later became secretary of the Prudential Approved Societies.

He entered politics in 1919 when he was elected to Surrey County Council, later becoming a county alderman, vice-chairman in 1939-1940 and was elected chairman of the council two months before his death.

In 1920 he was chosen as Coalition Conservative candidate for a parliamentary by-election at Dartford. He came in a poor third place when a swing against the government saw John Mills of the Labour Party take the seat.

Two years later he was again a candidate at a by-election, this time at Camberwell North. The Coalition Government in power since 1916 was beginning to unravel, and the election was a straight fight between Meller for the Conservatives and Charles Ammon of the Labour Party, neither of whom claimed to support the coalition.

Ammon was comfortably elected as public opinion turned against the coalition following the swingeing cuts of the Geddes Report.

At the ensuing 1923 general election Meller was elected as Conservative Member of Parliament for his home constituency of Mitcham. He held the seat at all subsequent elections until his death. He was knighted in 1933.

In 1937, he was named as charter mayor for the new Municipal Borough of Beddington and Wallington, which formed part of the Mitcham constituency.

== Personal life ==
Richard Meller married Jeanie Sibley in 1897, and they had three sons. He died at a nursing home in Sutton in June 1940, aged 67.

Parliament of the United Kingdom
Preceded by Chuter Ede	Member of Parliament for Mitcham; 1923–1940	Succeeded by Malcolm Robertson
