= Ronald Macleay =

British diplomat

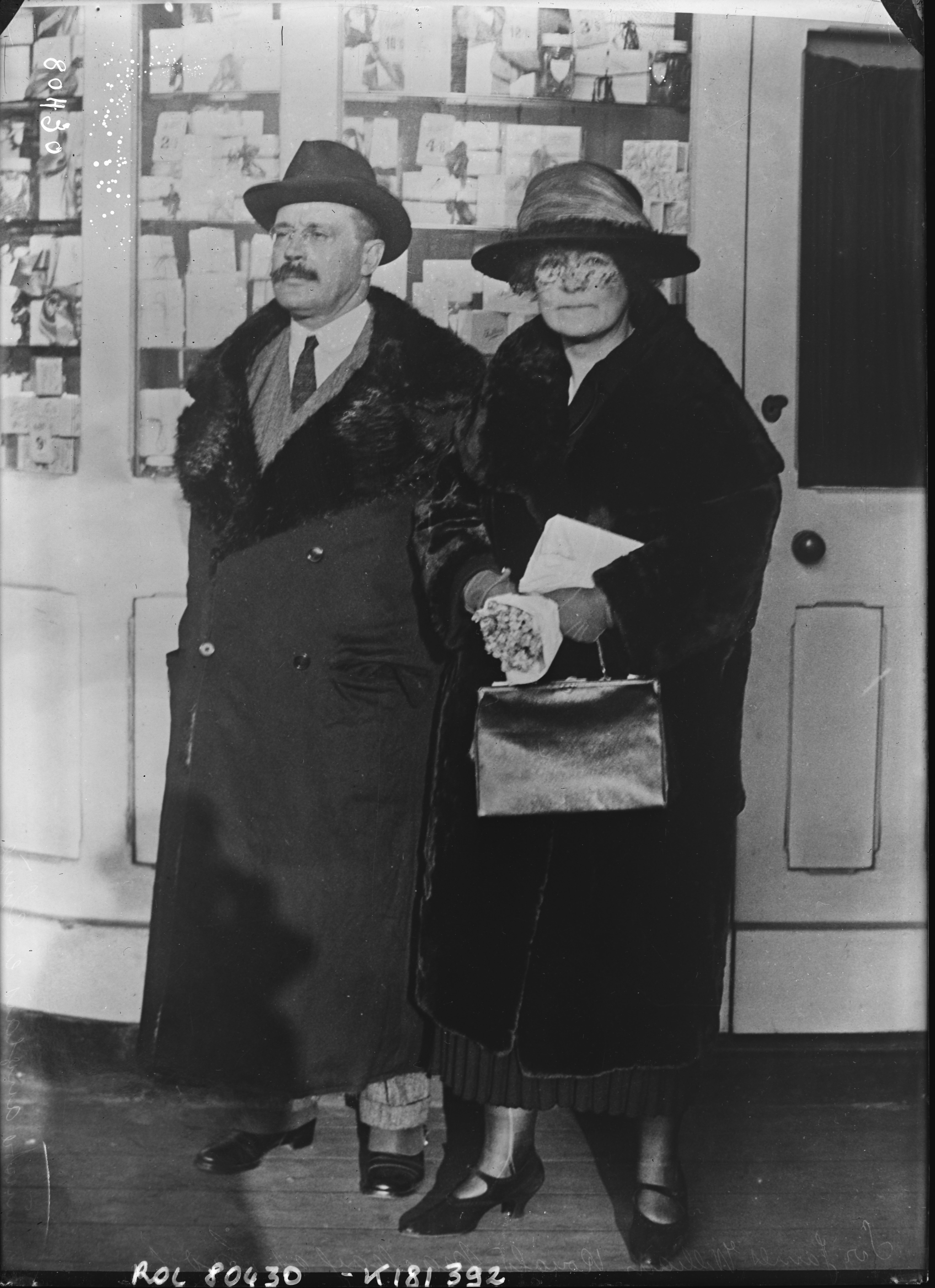

Sir James William Ronald Macleay GCMG (1870 – 5 March 1943) was a British diplomat.

== Biography ==
Macleay was educated at Charterhouse School and Balliol College, Oxford, and entered diplomatic service in 1895. He was appointed Second Secretary in November 1901. He served in Washington, D.C., Constantinople, Mexico City, and Brussels, among other postings. He was Counsellor with the British Legation in Peking in 1914–19 and was ambassador to Argentina in 1919–22. In 1922–26, Macleay returned to China, becoming ambassador to it.

Macleay's period as ambassador to China was criticized, and although he was favorable towards American ambassador John Van Antwerp MacMurray, the feeling was not reciprocated; MacMurray described him as "a Tory of the type that neither imagined good could come out of any liberal ideas hatched at Washington under the auspices of the American rebels, nor perceived within China itself had been developing ideas which had already challenged and movements which had undermined British primacy." In 1927–29 and 1930–33, Macleay was British Minister to Czechoslovakia until he returned to his post as ambassador to Argentina in 1933.

Macleay married Evelyn, daughter of Sir Robert Peel, 3rd Baronet, in 1901.
