= Frank John Powell =

British politician and magistrate

Frank John Powell (15 March 1891 – 31 October 1971) was a British Liberal Party politician and magistrate.

== Personal life ==
He was the son of Francis Cox Powell and was educated at Rutlish School and Inns of Court. He married Irene Hesse Wyatt in 1915 and they had two sons and one daughter. His wife died in 1955. He married Joan Selley, who died in 1965. He married Betty Edelson, who died in 1971.

== Career ==
He served with the Queen's Westminsters from 1910 to 1914 and then as a captain in the King's Own Yorkshire Light Infantry during World War I; he was gassed at the Battle of Loos in 1915.

He was called to the bar, Middle Temple, in 1921. He practised in London and on the South East circuit. He was then a Metropolitan Police magistrate from 1936 to 1963; Greenwich and Woolwich 1936–40, Tower Bridge 1940–1942 and Clerkenwell 1942–1963. He was appointed a justice of the peace for Surrey in 1937. He was Hon. Legal adviser to the New Malden Citizens Advice Bureau from 1939 to 1946 and was a member of the Council of the Magistrates Association from 1942 to 1960. He was a member of the Chairmen's Panel, of the Metropolitan Juvenile Courts, 1946–1952.

== Political career ==
He was on the executive committee of the National Young Life Campaign. He was Liberal candidate for the Kingston-upon-Thames Division of Surrey at the 1929 general election. Kingston was a safe Conservative seat that they had won at every election since it was created in 1885. Along with the national trend, Powell was able to increase the Liberal vote share;

General Election 1929: Kingston upon Thames Electorate 56,004
Party	Candidate	Votes	%	±%
Conservative	Sir Frederick Penny	20,911	54.1	−16.1
Labour	J.W. Fawcett	8,903	23.1	+3.3
Liberal	Frank John Powell	8,796	22.8	+12.8
Majority		12,008	31.0	
Turnout			68.9	−2.4
Conservative hold		Swing	-9.7	

It was expected that Powell would run again as Liberal candidate for Kingston, however he fell out with the local Liberal association in July 1931. He had openly criticised the leadership of Lloyd George in supporting the minority Labour government. The association's officers supported their leader's position and repudiated Powell. When the general election was called the local Liberals had not found a replacement candidate and the division went uncontested. During the October general election campaign, the split between Powell and the Kingston Liberals widened. He appeared on the platform of his Conservative opponent from 1929 to second his formal adoption as the candidate of the National Government. Powell claimed to be a supporter of Sir John Simon's Liberal National breakaway group. Meanwhile, Kingston Liberal Association was urging its activists to go and help in nearby seats while giving no advice to Liberal voters in Kingston on how to vote. Powell was Chairman of the Malden branch of the League of Nations Union. At some point after the 1931 election, Powell distanced himself from Simon's Liberal Nationals and repaired his relationship with Kingston Liberals. In March 1935 he was adopted as prospective Liberal candidate for Kingston. He was Liberal candidate again for the Kingston-upon-Thames Division of Surrey at the 1935 General Election. By then, the electoral fortunes of the party were in decline and he came a poor third;

General Election 1935: Kingston upon Thames Electorate 74,476
Party	Candidate	Votes	%	±%
Conservative	Sir Frederick Penny	32,953	67.5	
Labour	George H Loman	10,014	20.5	
Liberal	Frank John Powell	5,832	12.0	
Majority		22,939	47.0	
Turnout			65.5	
Conservative hold		Swing		

An opportunity came to contest the seat again at the 1937 Kingston-upon-Thames by-election, but the local Liberal association decided not to field a candidate. He was Chairman of the National Association of Homes and Hostels, 1955–60. He was President of the Probation Officers Christian Fellowship, 1954–66.
