= Shriti Vadera, Baroness Vadera =

Ugandan-born British banker and life peer (born 1962)

The Right Honourable The Baroness Vadera PC
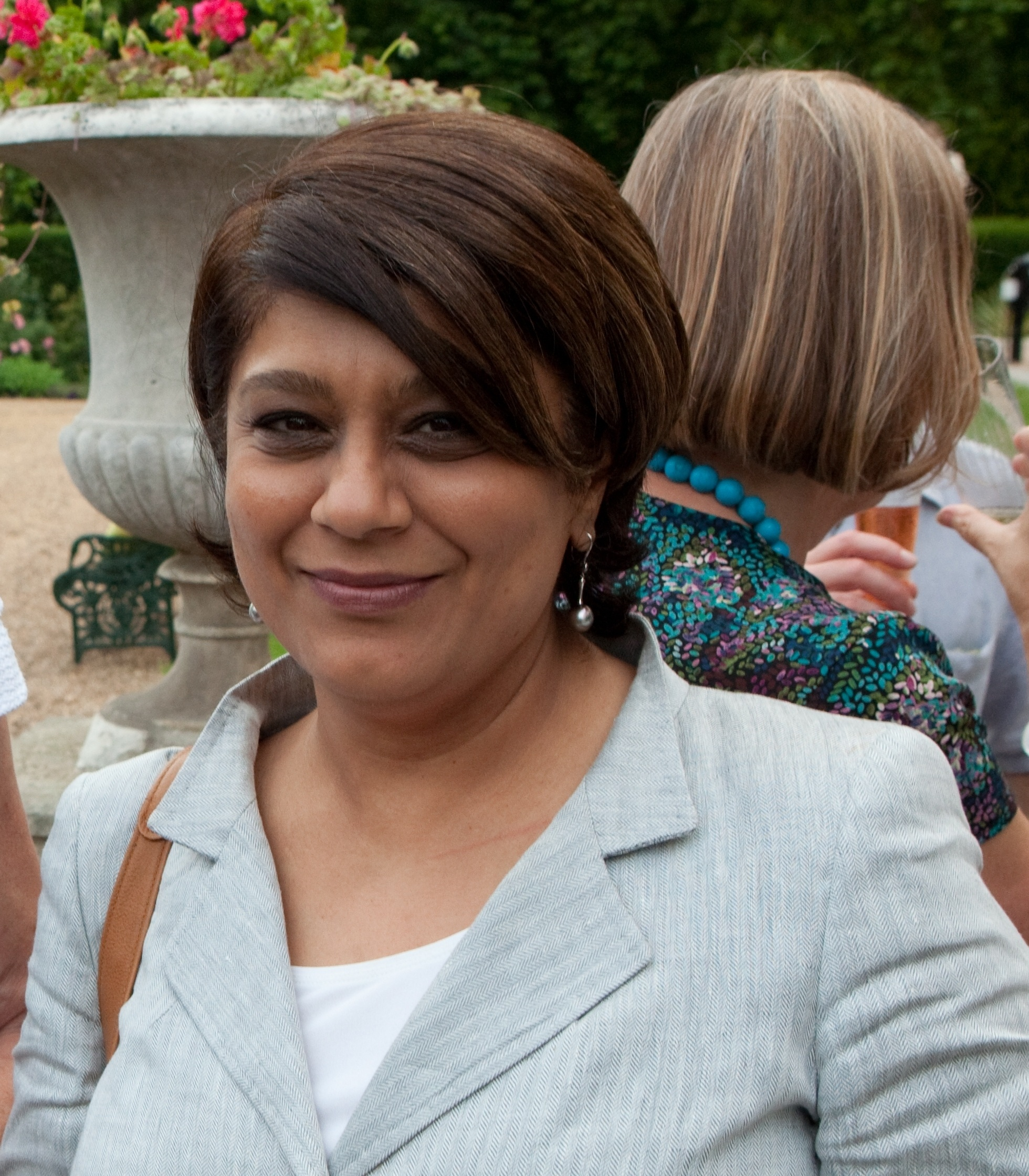
- Vadera in 2008

Parliamentary Secretary for the Cabinet Office
- In office 25 January 2008 – 25 September 2009
- Prime Minister: Gordon Brown
- Preceded by: Phil Hope
- Succeeded by: Tom Watson

Parliamentary Under-Secretary of State for Business, Innovation and Skills
- In office 9 June 2009 – 25 September 2009
- Prime Minister: Gordon Brown
- Preceded by: Ian Pearson
- Succeeded by: Anthony Young

Parliamentary Under-Secretary of State for Competitiveness and Small Business (Note: Competitiveness, Deregulation and British Business Council (2008))
- In office 25 January 2008 – 9 June 2009
- Prime Minister: Gordon Brown
- Preceded by: Stephen Timms
- Succeeded by: Pat McFadden

Parliamentary Under-Secretary of State for International Development
- In office 27 June 2007 – 25 January 2008
- Prime Minister: Gordon Brown
- Preceded by: Gareth Thomas
- Succeeded by: Joyce Anelay

Member of the House of Lords
- Lord Temporal
- Life peerage 11 July 2007

Personal details
- Born: Shriti Vadera; 23 June 1962 (age 64) Uganda
- Party: Labour
- Education: Somerville College, Oxford
- Occupation: Politician
- Profession: Banker

Shriti Vadera, Baroness Vadera, PC (born 23 June 1962) is a Ugandan-born British former investment banker and government minister who has been chair of Prudential plc since January 2021, having joined the board in May 2020. She served in the government of Gordon Brown in the Cabinet Office, Department for Business, Innovation and Skills and Department for International Development. She was chair of Santander UK from March 2015 to October 2020, the first woman to head a major British bank.

== Early life ==
Vadera was born in Uganda in 1962 to Indian Gujarati parents.

She is from a family who owned a small tea plantation but fled to India in 1972 following the Ugandan government's expulsion of Ugandan Asians, and then later to the UK. She was educated at Northwood College before taking a degree in Philosophy, Politics, and Economics at Somerville College, Oxford.

== Private sector career ==
For over 14 years Vadera was employed at investment bank UBS Warburg, where her work included advising governments of developing countries, and debt relief and restructuring. She also played a role in the partial privatisation of South African Telecom.

== Government adviser and minister ==
Vadera was on the Council of Economic Advisers at HM Treasury from 1999 to 2007, where she led on policy for business, competition innovation, productivity and international finance and development issues and the management of the Government's shareholdings, asset sales and public private partnerships for infrastructure.

Following his appointment as Prime Minister in June 2007, Gordon Brown appointed her as Parliamentary Under-Secretary of State in the Department for International Development. As she was not a member of either of the Houses of Parliament, she was created a life peer on 11 July 2007 as Baroness Vadera, of Holland Park in the Royal Borough of Kensington & Chelsea. The Sunday Times reported that Gus O'Donnell, the Cabinet Secretary, "flatly refus[ed] to allow her to cross the threshold of No 10 as policy enforcer" and "no Permanent Secretary could stand her" – although he later denied making these comments.

Following criticism of her working style Stephen Alambritis, of the Federation of Small Businesses (also a Merton Labour councillor) said: "If the Civil Service is complaining about her, then probably more ministers should be like her; she gets things done."

After six months as a Minister in International Development, she was moved to the Department for Business, Enterprise and Regulatory Reform. In October 2008, she also became a Parliamentary Secretary in the Cabinet Office.

In January 2009 she gave an interview on ITV's Lunchtime News, which concluded:

Alastair Stewart: "Final and briefest thought possible – you're a former banker and business person yourself and now a minister – when will we see the green shoots of recovery?
Baroness Vadera: "Well, it's a very uncertain world right now globally but I wouldn't want to be the one predicting it. I am seeing a few green shoots but it's a little bit too early to say exactly how they'll grow."

Her reply generated commentary from a number of sources, including shadow chancellor George Osborne and former chancellor Norman Lamont, who first used the phrase "green shoots" in 1991. Lamont said: "It is extremely premature to use a phrase like that."

Later that year the Evening Standard reported that Vadera was instrumental in the creation of an unprecedented banking rescue package. On 24 September 2009, it was announced that she would be stepping down as minister to take up a new role advising the G20.

Vadera has been on a leave of absence from the House of Lords since December 2011.

== Life after politics ==
In April 2010, the Financial Times reported that Vadera had taken up a consultancy to give strategic advice in restructuring Dubai World's US$26 billion debt. In July, the Daily Telegraph reported Vadera had become consultant to Singaporean investment company Temasek.

In 2019, Vadera was mentioned by British news media as a candidate to succeed Mark Carney as Governor of the Bank of England.

In 2021, Vadera was appointed chair of the Royal Shakespeare Company, the first woman and person of colour in the role.

In 2023, the World Bank's president Ajay Banga appointed Vadera as co-chair – alongside Mark Carney – of the Private Sector Investment Lab.

== Other activities ==
=== Corporate boards ===
- Prudential plc, Non-Executive Chair (since 2021)
- Santander UK, Non-Executive Chair (2015–2020)
- BHP, Non-Executive Member of the Board of Directors (2010–2020)
- AstraZeneca, Non-Executive Member of the Board of Directors (2010–2018)

=== Non-profit organizations ===
- Chatham House, Senior Advisor
- Institute of International Finance, Member of the Board

== Recognition ==
In 2016, Vadera was included in that year's list of the BBC's 100 Women.
