= Kasman =

Kasman may refer to the following people:

Given name

- Kasman Singodimedjo (1904-1982), Indonesian politician

Surname

- Bruce Kasman, American economist
- Firdaus Kasman (born 1988), Singapore footballer
- Leon Kasman (1905–1984), Polish journalist and politician
- Shari Kasman, Canadian artist and author
- Yakov Kasman (born 1967), Russian-American classical pianist and professor
