= Kingston-upon-Thames (constituency) =

Parliamentary constituency in the United Kingdom, 1885–1997

- Former borough constituency for the House of Commons
- County: 1885–1965: Surrey; 1965–1997: Greater London
- Major settlements: Kingston upon Thames

1918–1997
- Seats: One
- Replaced by: Kingston and Surbiton; Richmond Park

1885–1918
- Seats: One
- Type of constituency: County constituency
- Created from: Mid Surrey
- Replaced by: seat shown above and Richmond (Surrey)

Kingston or Kingston-upon-Thames was a parliamentary constituency which covered the emerging southwest, outer London suburb of Kingston upon Thames (until 1965 in Surrey) and which existed between 1885 and 1997 and returned one Member of Parliament (MP) to the House of Commons of the UK Parliament. The Conservative candidate won each election during its 112-year existence.

== History ==
The seat was created for the 1885 general election as a county division called Kingston equivalent to the northwest corner of the former two-seat Mid Surrey division. It became a borough constituency for the present purposes of election expenses and type of returning officer at the 1918 general election, when it was formally renamed Kingston-upon-Thames.

It was abolished for the 1997 general election. Its territory was then divided between the new constituencies of Kingston and Surbiton and Richmond Park.

The constituency's most high-profile MP was the Conservative Norman Lamont, who was Chancellor of the Exchequer from 1990 to 1993.

== Boundaries ==
1950–1955: The boroughs of Kingston upon Thames, and Surbiton

1955–1983: The boroughs of Kingston upon Thames, and Malden and Coombe

1983–1997: The London Borough of Kingston upon Thames wards of Burlington, Cambridge, Canbury, Coombe, Grove, Hill, Malden, Manor, Norbiton, Norbiton Park, St James, and Tudor

The seat since 1950 omitted all southern wards of Kingston upon Thames. These fell into the 1950-established seat of Surbiton, which replicated its own borough that merged with Kingston's borough in 1965.

== Members of Parliament ==
Election	Member	Party	Senior Frontbench positions
1885	Sir John Ellis	Conservative	none
1892	Sir Richard Temple	Conservative	none
1895	Thomas Skewes-Cox	Conservative	none
1906	George Cave	Conservative	Home Secretary (1916-1919); Later Lord (High) Chancellor
1918	John Campbell	Unionist	none
1922	Sir Frederick Penny	Unionist	none
1937 b-e	Sir Percy Royds	Conservative	none
1945	John Boyd-Carpenter	Conservative	Chief Secretary to the Treasury (1962-1964)
1972 b-e	Norman Lamont	Conservative	Chief Secretary to the Treasury (1989-1990); Chancellor of the Exchequer (1990-1993)
1997	constituency abolished		

== Elections ==
=== Elections in the 1880s ===
General election 1885: Kingston-upon-Thames
Party	Candidate	Votes	%	±%
Conservative	John Whittaker Ellis	4,915	60.5	
Liberal	Charles Duncan Hodgson	3,206	39.5	
Majority		1,709	21.0	
Turnout		8,121	73.1	
Registered electors		11,102		
Conservative win (new seat)				

General election 1886: Kingston-upon-Thames
Party	Candidate	Votes	%	±%
Conservative	John Whittaker Ellis	Unopposed		
Conservative hold				

=== Elections in the 1890s ===
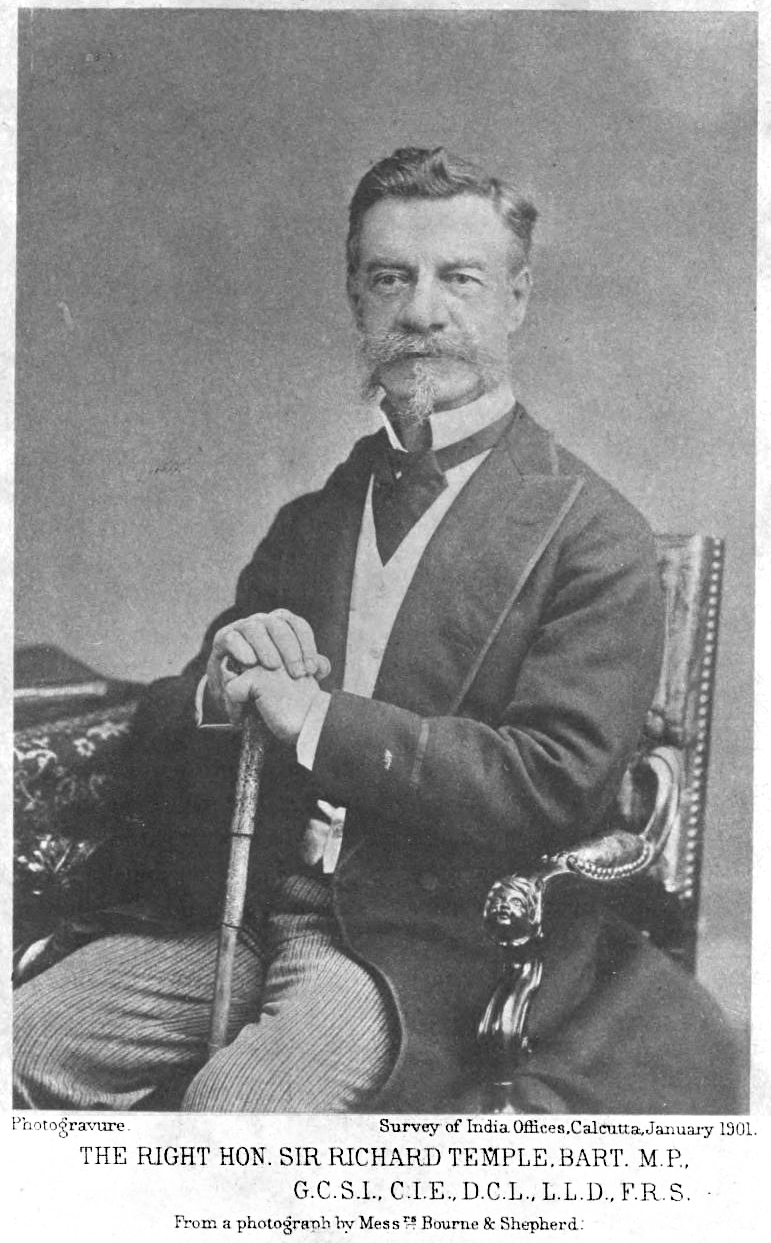

General election 1892: Kingston-upon-Thames
Party	Candidate	Votes	%	±%
Conservative	Richard Temple	5,100	53.9	N/A
Liberal	Charles Duncan Hodgson	4,357	46.1	New
Majority		743	7.8	N/A
Turnout		9,457	73.7	N/A
Registered electors		12,825		
Conservative hold		Swing	N/A	

T. Skewes-Cox

General election 1895: Kingston-upon-Thames
Party	Candidate	Votes	%	±%
Conservative	Thomas Skewes-Cox	5,745	61.5	+7.6
Liberal	Charles Burt	3,600	38.5	−7.6
Majority		2,145	23.0	+15.2
Turnout		9,345	68.6	−5.1
Registered electors		13,631		
Conservative hold		Swing	+7.6	

=== Elections in the 1900s ===
General election 1900: Kingston-upon-Thames
Party	Candidate	Votes	%	±%
Conservative	Thomas Skewes-Cox	Unopposed		
Conservative hold				

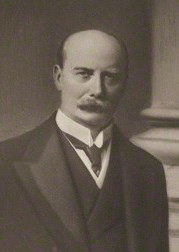
George Cave

General election 1906: Kingston-upon-Thames
Party	Candidate	Votes	%	±%
Conservative	George Cave	7,656	53.6	N/A
Liberal	Robert Whyte	6,637	46.4	New
Majority		1,019	7.2	N/A
Turnout		14,293	82.8	N/A
Registered electors		17,270		
Conservative hold		Swing	N/A	

=== Elections in the 1910s ===
Holzapfel

General election January 1910: Kingston-upon-Thames
Party	Candidate	Votes	%	±%
Conservative	George Cave	10,918	65.3	+11.7
Liberal	Albert George Holzapfel	5,814	34.7	−11.7
Majority		5,104	30.6	+23.4
Turnout		16,732	85.2	+2.4
Registered electors		19,647		
Conservative hold		Swing	+11.7	

General election December 1910: Kingston-upon-Thames
Party	Candidate	Votes	%	±%
Conservative	George Cave	Unopposed		
Conservative hold				

General Election 1914–15:

Another General Election was required to take place before the end of 1915. The political parties had been making preparations for an election to take place and, by July 1914, the following candidates had been selected:

- Unionist: George Cave
- Liberal:

By-election, 1915: Kingston-upon-Thames
Party	Candidate	Votes	%	±%
Unionist	George Cave	Unopposed		
Unionist hold				

General election 1918: Kingston upon Thames
Party		Candidate	Votes	%	±%
C	Unionist	John Campbell	13,596	73.8	N/A
	Labour	Thomas Henry Dumper	2,502	13.6	New
	Liberal	Arnold Ellis Ely	2,325	12.6	New
Majority			11,094	60.2	N/A
Turnout			18,423	51.7	N/A
Registered electors			35,656		
	Unionist hold		Swing	N/A	
C indicates candidate endorsed by the coalition government.

=== Elections in the 1920s ===
General election 1922: Kingston upon Thames
Party	Candidate	Votes	%	±%
Unionist	George Penny	15,136	66.7	−7.1
Independent Labour	* Harry Day	7,563	33.3	New
Majority		7,573	33.4	−36.8
Turnout		22,699	59.3	+7.6
Registered electors		38,265		
Unionist hold		Swing	−7.1	

* Day was supported by the local Labour and Liberal parties.

General election 1923: Kingston upon Thames
Party	Candidate	Votes	%	±%
Unionist	George Penny	12,968	61.6	−5.1
Liberal	William Freeman	8,095	38.4	New
Majority		4,873	23.2	−10.2
Turnout		21,063	53.9	−5.4
Registered electors		39,044		
Unionist hold		Swing	−5.1	

General election 1924: Kingston upon Thames
Party	Candidate	Votes	%	±%
Unionist	George Penny	19,933	70.2	+8.6
Labour	Arthur Balfour Bishop	5,640	19.8	New
Liberal	William Freeman	2,850	10.0	−28.4
Majority		14,293	50.4	+27.2
Turnout		28,423	71.3	+17.4
Registered electors		39,868		
Unionist hold		Swing	+18.5	

General election 1929: Kingston upon Thames
Party	Candidate	Votes	%	±%
Unionist	George Penny	20,911	54.1	−16.1
Labour	John William Fawcett	8,903	23.1	+3.3
Liberal	Frank John Powell	8,796	22.8	+12.8
Majority		12,008	31.0	−19.4
Turnout		38,610	68.9	−2.4
Registered electors		56,004		
Unionist hold		Swing	−9.7	

=== Elections in the 1930s ===
General election 1931: Kingston upon Thames
Party	Candidate	Votes	%	±%
Conservative	George Penny	35,925	82.5	+28.4
Labour	John William Fawcett	7,613	17.5	−5.6
Majority		28,312	65.0	+34.0
Turnout		43,538	69.2	+0.3
Conservative hold		Swing		

General election 1935: Kingston upon Thames
Party	Candidate	Votes	%	±%
Conservative	George Penny	32,953	67.5	−15.0
Labour	George Henry Loman	10,014	20.5	+3.0
Liberal	Frank John Powell	5,832	12.0	New
Majority		22,939	47.0	−18.0
Turnout		48,799	65.5	−3.7
Conservative hold		Swing		

1937 Kingston-upon-Thames by-election
Party	Candidate	Votes	%	±%
Conservative	Percy Royds	19,887	66.6	−0.9
Labour	George Henry Loman	9,972	33.4	+12.9
Majority		9,915	33.2	−13.8
Turnout		29,859	38.1	−27.4
Conservative hold		Swing		

General Election 1939–40

Another General Election was required to take place before the end of 1940. The political parties had been making preparations for an election to take place and, by the autumn of 1939, the following candidates had been selected:

- Conservative: Percy Royds
- Labour: Dennis Gordon
- Liberal: Henry Cecil Banting

=== Elections in the 1940s ===
General election 1945: Kingston upon Thames
Party	Candidate	Votes	%	±%
Conservative	John Boyd-Carpenter	37,085	56.5	−10.1
Labour	George Elvin	28,516	43.5	+10.1
Majority		8,569	13.0	−20.2
Turnout		65,601	74.0	+35.9
Conservative hold		Swing		

=== Elections in the 1950s ===
General election 1950: Kingston upon Thames
Party	Candidate	Votes	%	±%
Conservative	John Boyd-Carpenter	36,886	58.98	
Labour	Nora M Johns	21,229	33.94	
Liberal	Donald George Maskrey	4,429	7.08	New
Majority		15,657	25.04	
Turnout		62,544	85.24	
Conservative hold		Swing		

General election 1951: Kingston upon Thames
Party	Candidate	Votes	%	±%
Conservative	John Boyd-Carpenter	38,516	63.52	
Labour	Ray Hesketh	22,117	36.48	
Majority		16,399	27.04	
Turnout		60,633	81.14	
Conservative hold		Swing		

General election 1955: Kingston upon Thames
Party	Candidate	Votes	%	±%
Conservative	John Boyd-Carpenter	31,069	65.86	
Labour	George Henry Loman	16,104	34.14	
Majority		14,965	31.72	
Turnout		47,173	76.38	
Conservative hold		Swing		

General election 1959: Kingston upon Thames
Party	Candidate	Votes	%	±%
Conservative	John Boyd-Carpenter	31,649	67.26	
Labour	Tom Braddock	15,408	32.74	
Majority		16,241	34.52	
Turnout		47,057	77.91	
Conservative hold		Swing		

=== Elections in the 1960s ===
General election 1964: Kingston upon Thames
Party	Candidate	Votes	%	±%
Conservative	John Boyd-Carpenter	23,973	52.79	
Labour	Tom Braddock	13,611	29.97	
Liberal	Stanley Rundle	7,827	17.24	
Majority		10,362	22.82	
Turnout		45,411	77.12	
Conservative hold		Swing		

General election 1966: Kingston upon Thames
Party	Candidate	Votes	%	±%
Conservative	John Boyd-Carpenter	22,781	51.29	
Labour	James Stewart Cook	14,915	33.58	
Liberal	Michael F Burns	6,722	15.13	
Majority		7,866	17.71	
Turnout		44,418	76.97	
Conservative hold		Swing		

=== Elections in the 1970s ===
General election 1970: Kingston-Upon Thames
Party	Candidate	Votes	%	±%
Conservative	John Boyd-Carpenter	23,426	56.67	
Labour	Robin H Crockett	13,090	31.67	
Liberal	Stephen J. Wells	4,822	11.66	
Majority		10,336	25.00	
Turnout		41,338	69.13	
Conservative hold		Swing		

1972 Kingston-upon-Thames by-election
Party	Candidate	Votes	%	±%
Conservative	Norman Lamont	16,679	52.32	−4.35
Labour	Anthony Judge	9,892	31.03	−0.64
Liberal	Stephen J. Wells	3,601	11.30	−0.36
Anti-Common Market Conservative	Edgar Scruby	1,705	5.35	New
Majority		6,787	21.29	−3.71
Turnout		31,877		
Conservative hold		Swing		

General election February 1974: Kingston upon Thames
Party	Candidate	Votes	%	±%
Conservative	Norman Lamont	23,006	48.57	
Liberal	Stephen J. Wells	12,699	28.81	
Labour	Chris Mullin	11,369	24.00	
Anti-Common Market Conservative	M.J. Christie	288	0.61	
Majority		10,307	21.76	
Turnout		47,362	80.53	
Conservative hold		Swing		

General election October 1974: Kingston upon Thames
Party	Candidate	Votes	%	±%
Conservative	Norman Lamont	20,680	48.63	
Labour	A. Quick	12,266	28.84	
Liberal	Stephen J. Wells	9,580	22.53	
Majority		8,414	19.79	
Turnout		42,526	71.77	
Conservative hold		Swing		

General election 1979: Kingston upon Thames
Party	Candidate	Votes	%	±%
Conservative	Norman Lamont	24,944	57.85	
Labour	John A. Torode	11,400	26.44	
Liberal	Declan Terry	6,771	15.70	
Majority		13,544	31.41	
Turnout		43,115	74.89	
Conservative hold		Swing		

=== Elections in the 1980s ===
General election 1983: Kingston upon Thames
Party	Candidate	Votes	%	±%
Conservative	Norman Lamont	22,094	54.1	
Liberal	Roger Hayes	13,222	32.4	
Labour	Peter J. Smith	4,977	12.2	
Ecology	Alexandra Presant-Collins	290	0.7	New
Loony Society	Peter Dodd	259	0.6	New
Majority		8,872	21.7	
Turnout		40,842	71.9	
Conservative hold		Swing		

General election 1987: Kingston upon Thames
Party	Candidate	Votes	%	±%
Conservative	Norman Lamont	24,198	56.2	+2.1
Liberal	Roger Hayes	13,012	30.2	−2.2
Labour	Robert Markless	5,676	13.2	+1.0
CPWSML	Jack Baker	175	0.4	New
Majority		11,186	26.0	+4.3
Turnout		43,061	78.5	+6.6
Conservative hold		Swing	+2.2	

=== Elections in the 1990s ===
General election 1992: Kingston upon Thames
Party	Candidate	Votes	%	±%
Conservative	Norman Lamont	20,675	51.6	−4.6
Liberal Democrats	Derek Osbourne	10,522	26.3	−3.9
Labour	Robert Markless	7,748	19.3	+6.1
Liberal	Adrian Amer	771	1.9	New
Monster Raving Loony	David Beaupré	212	0.5	New
Natural Law	Graham Woollcoombe	81	0.2	New
Anti-Federalist League	Anthony Scholefield	42	0.1	New
Majority		10,153	25.3	−0.7
Turnout		40,051	78.4	−0.1
Conservative hold		Swing	−0.3	

Parliament of the United Kingdom
Preceded by Huntingdon	Constituency represented by the chancellor of the Exchequer; 1990–1993	Succeeded by Rushcliffe
