= Sir Richard Temple, 1st Baronet =

British civil servant (1826–1902)

The Right Honourable Sir Richard Temple Bt GCSI CIE FRS
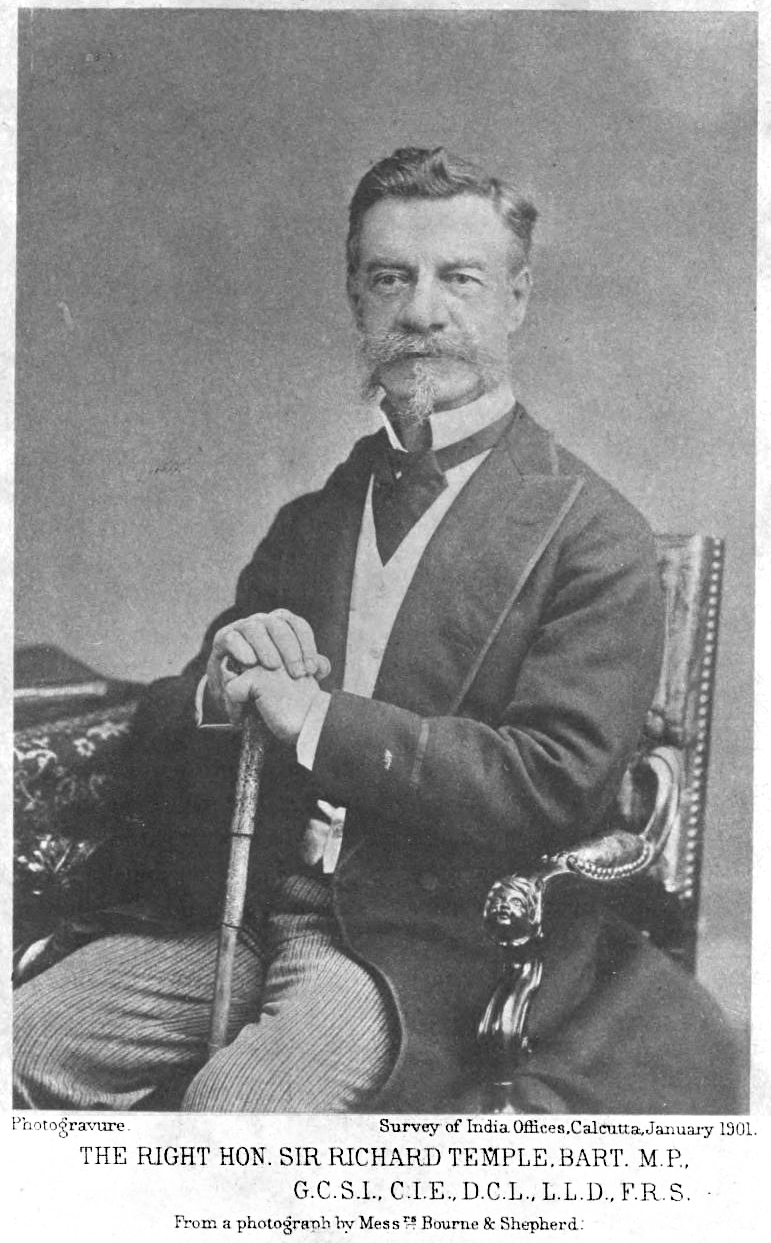

Governor of Bombay
- In office 1877–1880
- Preceded by: Sir Philip Wodehouse
- Succeeded by: Sir James Fergusson

Personal details
- Born: 8 March 1826
- Died: 15 March 1902 (aged 76)
- Education: East India Company College

Sir Richard Temple, 1st Baronet GCSI, CIE, PC, FRS (8 March 1826 – 15 March 1902), was a British colonial administrator in the 19th-century India, who served as Governor of Bombay from 1877 to 1880.

== Early life ==
Temple was the son of Richard Temple (1800–1874) and his first wife Louisa Anne Rivett-Carnac (d. 1837), a daughter of James Rivett-Carnac. His paternal ancestor, William Dicken of Sheinton, Shropshire, married in the middle of the 18th century the daughter and co-heiress of Sir William Temple, 5th Baronet (1694–1760), of the Temple baronets of Stowe. Their son assumed the surname Temple in 1796, and inherited the Temple manor-house and estate of The Nash, near Kempsey in Worcestershire. Richard Temple (born 1826) inherited the estate on his father's death in 1874.

== Career ==
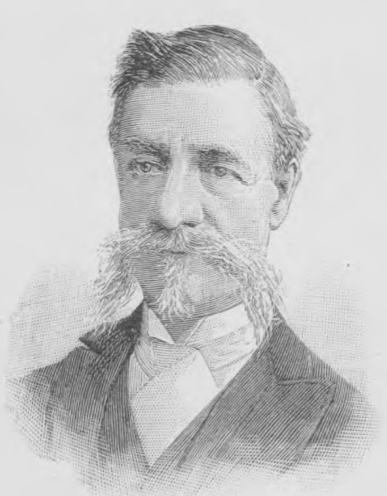

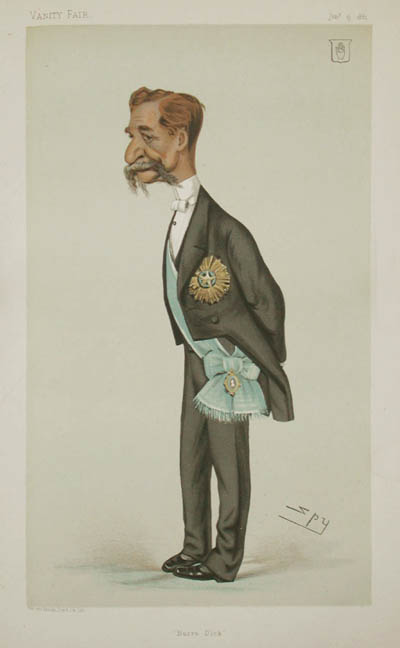
"Burra Dick" Temple as caricatured by Spy (Leslie Ward) in Vanity Fair, January 1881

After being educated at Rugby and the East India Company College at Haileybury, Temple joined the Bengal Civil Service in 1846. His hard work and literary skill were soon recognised; he was private secretary for some years to John Lawrence in the Punjab, and gained useful financial experience under James Wilson. He served as Chief Commissioner for the Central Provinces until 1867, when he was appointed Resident at Hyderabad. In 1867 he was made Knight Commander of the Order of the Star of India (KCSI). In 1868 he became a member of the supreme government of India, first as foreign secretary and then as finance minister.

He was made lieutenant-governor of Bengal Presidency in 1874, and prevented large scale deaths during the famine of 1874, importing half a million tons of rice from British Burma to bring substantial relief to the victims of the famine. This was one of the very few times the British authorities provided adequate famine relief. The British government, dogmatically committed to a laissez-faire economic policy, castigated Temple for interfering in the workings of the market. He was then appointed by the Viceroy of India as a plenipotentiary famine delegate to Madras during the famine of 1877 there. Seeing this appointment as an opportunity to "retrieve his reputation for extravagance in the last famine," Temple implemented new relief policies which ultimately failed to relieve widespread starvation. In 1877, a poor crop harvest in Britain raised prices of grain, while India exported twice as much wheat than the previous year. In addition to the colonial government's refusal to suspend taxation, this led to severe food shortages, particularly in areas supplied by railroads and granaries. Implementing what was known as the "Temple wage", which was not scientifically-derived, Temple tried to determine the minimum amount of food required by "men doing heavy labour" per day. In labour camps established for construction of railroads and canals, the diets of workers were just one pound of rice a day (unsupplemented by meat or vegetables) providing 1,627 calories a day- 2,200 calories less than recommended for Indian males doing heavy labour in the 21st century.

His services were recognised with a baronetcy in 1876. In 1877 he was made Governor of Bombay Presidency, and his activity during the Afghan War of 1878–80 was untiring.

In 1880, when Temple was nearing the end of his service in British India, it was proposed that a commemorative statue for his 33 years in the Indian Civil Service (Note: The Indian Civil Service was established in 1858 after the Indian Rebellion of 1857. Temple's 33 years includes his time in the civil service of the East India Company, which preceded this.) be erected. The standing marble statue was completed by Thomas Brock in 1884. It shows him carrying his cloak over his arm and an elaborate 19th-century dress uniform with swags, ties and medals. They are, in fact, the costume of a Grand Commander of the Star of India, the formal attire for Governors of the Presidencies. The statue was unveiled with much pomp at the North end of Bombay's Oval. It was moved in August 1965 to the grounds beside the Bhau Daji Lad Museum, Byculla, Bombay (Victoria and Albert Museum).

Five years later, in 1885, Temple was returned as a Conservative MP for the Evesham division of Worcestershire. Meanwhile, he produced several books on Indian subjects. In parliament, he was assiduous in his attendance, and he spoke on Indian subjects with admitted authority. He was not otherwise a parliamentary success, and to the public, he was best known from caricatures in Punch, which exaggerated his physical peculiarities and made him look like a lean and hungry tiger. In 1885 he became vice-chairman of the London School Board, and as chairman of its finance committee, he did useful and congenial work. In 1892 he changed his constituency for the Kingston division, but in 1895 he retired from parliament. In 1896 he was appointed a Privy Councillor.

Temple had kept a careful journal of his parliamentary experiences, intended for posthumous publication; and he self-published a short volume of reminiscences. He died at his residence at Hampstead on 15 March 1902, from heart failure.

== Publications ==
Works by Temple include:

- India in 1880
- Lord Lawrence
- Men and Events of My Time in India
- Oriental Experience
- Essays and Addresses
- Journal at Hyderabad
- Palestine Illustrated
- Legends of the Punjab
- John Lawrence, a monograph on John Lawrence, 1st Baron Lawrence
- James Thomason, a monograph on James Thomason
- The Lake Region of Sikkim, on the Frontier of Tibet, a lecture in 1881
- Sir Richard Carnac Temple (1887). Journals Kept in Hyderabad, Kashmir, Sikkim, and Nepal. W. H. Allen.

Temple also edited the 17th-century seaman Thomas Bowrey's A Geographical Account of Countries Round the Bay of Bengal, 1669 to 1679, published in 1905.

== Family ==
Temple was twice married. First, in 1849, to Charlotte Frances Martindale, daughter of Benjamin Martindale. She died in 1855, leaving him with two young sons and a daughter:

- Richard Carnac Temple, 2nd Baronet (1850–1931)
- Lieutenant-Colonel Henry Martindale Temple, ISC (1853–1905), of the diplomatic service
- Edith Frances Temple (1855–1933)

He remarried, in 1871, Mary Augusta Lindsay, daughter of Charles Robert Lindsay, of the Indian Civil Service, and a member of the family of the Earls of Crawford and Balcarres. Lady Temple was appointed a Companion of the Order of the Crown of India (CI) on its institution in 1878. She died in 1924, and they had a son from the marriage:

- Charles Lindsay Temple (1871–1929), later Lieutenant-Governor of Northern Nigeria

== Arms ==
Coat of arms of Sir Richard Temple, 1st Baronet
Crest On a ducal coronet a martlet Or. Escutcheon Quarterly 1st & 4th Or an eagle displayed Sable; 2nd & 3rd Argent two bars Sable each charged with three martlets Or. Motto Templa Quam Dilecta

Government offices
Preceded by George Campbell	Lieutenant-Governor of Bengal; 1874–1877	Succeeded by Sir Ashley Eden
Preceded by Sir Philip Wodehouse	Governor of Bombay; 1877–1880	Succeeded by Sir James Fergusson, Bt.
Parliament of the United Kingdom
Preceded by Frederick Dixon-Hartland	Member of Parliament for Evesham; 1885–1892	Succeeded by Sir Edmund Lechmere, Bt.
Preceded by Sir John Ellis, Bt.	Member of Parliament for Kingston; 1892–1895	Succeeded by Sir Thomas Skewes-Cox
Baronetage of the United Kingdom
New creation	Baronet of Kempsey; 1876–1902	Succeeded by Richard Carnac Temple
