= Green shoots =

Economic metaphor

Green shoots is a term used colloquially and propagandistically to indicate signs of economic recovery during an economic downturn. It was first used in this sense by Norman Lamont, the then Chancellor of the Exchequer of the United Kingdom, during the 1991 Recession. At the time, Chancellor Lamont was criticized for being insensitive to the overall economic situation. The phrase was used again by Baroness Vadera, former Business Minister of the UK in January, 2009 to refer to signs of economic recovery during the late-2000s recession, again to criticism from the media and opposition politicians. The U.S. media started to use the phrase to describe domestic economic conditions in February 2009 when the New York Times quoted Bruce Kasman, chief economist at JPMorgan Chase as saying, "It's too early to get excited, but I think there are a couple of green shoots that say we're not going down as heavily in the first quarter [of 2009] as we were in the fourth quarter [of 2008]." The Federal Reserve Chairman, Ben Bernanke, made the first public use of the phrase by a Fed official in a March 15, 2009 interview with CBS 60 Minutes. Since February and March 2009, it has been used increasingly in the media to refer to positive economic data and statistics during the late-2000s (decade) recession.

More recently, the term has also been used in the United Kingdom in relation to the slowing spread of Coronavirus disease during the 2020 pandemic.
