= Viscount Marchwood =

Viscountcy in the Peerage of the United Kingdom

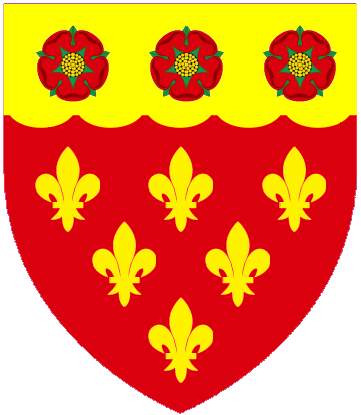
Shield of Arms

Viscount Marchwood, of Penang and of Marchwood in the County of Southampton, is a title in the Peerage of the United Kingdom. It was created in 1945 for the businessman and Conservative politician Frederick Penny, 1st Baron Marchwood. He had already been created a baronet, of Marchwood in the county of Southampton, in the Baronetage of the United Kingdom on 19 June 1933, and Baron Marchwood, of Penang and of Marchwood in the County of Southampton, in 1937, also in the peerage of the United Kingdom.

As of 2022 the titles are held by his great-grandson, the fourth Viscount, who succeeded his father in that year. The third Viscount was educated at Winchester College and served in the Royal Horse Guards, before a career in the drinks industry, first at Cadbury Schweppes, then as managing director of Moet et Chandon.

The family seat was The Filberts in Aston Tirrold, Berkshire (now Oxfordshire).

== Viscounts Marchwood (1945) ==
- Frederick George Penny, 1st Viscount Marchwood (1876–1955)
- Peter George Penny, 2nd Viscount Marchwood (1912–1979)
- David George Staveley Penny, 3rd Viscount Marchwood (1936–2022)
- Peter George Worsley Penny, 4th Viscount Marchwood (b. 1965)

The heir apparent is the present holder’s only son Hon. Christopher (Kit) David George Penny (b. 1999)

Coat of arms of Viscount Marchwood

Crest
Issuant from a circlet Or a demi-lion Gules collard Sable charged on the shoulder with a rose and holding in the dexter paw a fleur-de-lis Gold.
Escutcheon
Gules six fleurs-de-lis three two and one Or on a chief engrailed of the second three roses of the first barbed and seeded Proper.
Supporters
On the dexter side a Malayan tiger and on the sinister side a sea lion both Proper.
Motto
Semper Paratus

== Line of succession ==
- Frederick George Penny, 1st Viscount Marchwood (1876–1955)
  - Peter George Penny, 2nd Viscount Marchwood (1912–1979)
    - David George Staveley Penny, 3rd Viscount Marchwood (1936–2022)
      - Peter George Worsley Penny, 4th Viscount Marchwood (b. 1965)
        - (1) Hon. Christopher David George Penny (b. 1999)
      - (2) Hon. Nicholas Mark Staveley Penny (b. 1967)
      - (3) Hon. Edward James Frederick Penny (b. 1970)
        - (4) Alexander George Robert Penny (b. 1997)
