= Police Minstrels =

The Police Minstrels was a concert party consisting of members of the London Metropolitan Police.

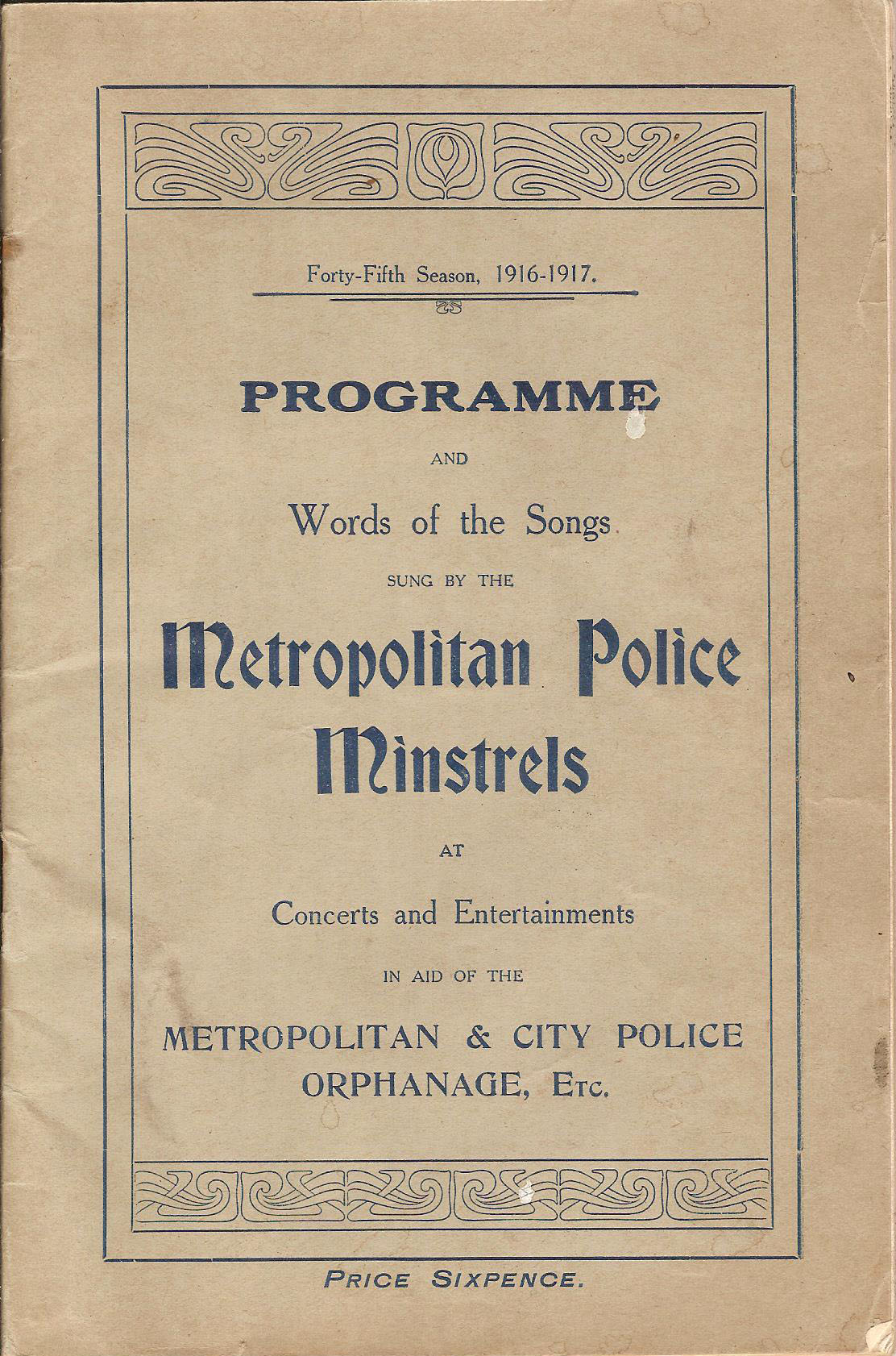

Founded in 1872 by ten officers from "A" Division (Whitehall), the Minstrels consisted of police officers who could sing or play a musical instrument. They performed at police stations to entertain the officers, and also gave public concerts in aid of police charities. The Minstrels wore evening dress and blackface makeup, in the manner of the typical minstrel shows of the period, and sang negro spirituals and popular ballads and songs, as well as playing instrumentals. They also performed comedy sketches, originally written for them by the popular music hall artiste and pantomime dame Clarkson Rose. The Minstrels were very popular - in the 1928/29 season alone, they gave about 140 performances.

Seats for the public concerts were sold door-to-door by uniformed Sergeants. Commissioners Sir William Horwood and Lord Byng both objected to this, as did the Police Federation, claiming that people may feel intimidated into buying tickets and that it detracted from the dignity of the rank. The Minstrels survived by pointing to the amounts of money they raised for charity. However, Lord Trenchard discovered that ticket sales were entirely dependent on this method of selling and felt that this was a form of blackmail. In 1932, he ordered that the door-to-door selling should cease. The Minstrels attempted to continue by selling tickets from theatre box offices and police stations, but were disbanded the following year.

The Minstrels raised a total of £250,000 for the Metropolitan and City Police Orphanage, the Metropolitan and City Police Convalescent Home Fund, and the Widows' and Relief Funds. Trenchard set up the Commissioner's Fund to replace this vital source of income for these police charities.

The most prominent member of the Minstrels was Sir James Olive, the first Deputy Commissioner, who had been a founder member in 1872 and later became the group's president.
