= David Penny, 3rd Viscount Marchwood =

British peer (1936–2022)

David George Staveley Penny, 3rd Viscount Marchwood (22 May 1936 – 3 October 2022) was a British peer, a Conservative member of the House of Lords from 1979 to 1999.

== Early life and education ==
Lord Marchwood was the elder son of Peter Penny, 2nd Viscount Marchwood and his wife Pamela Colton-Fox. He was educated at Winchester College and then commissioned into the Royal Horse Guards as a 2nd Lieutenant, serving between 1955 and 1957.

On 6 April 1979, he succeeded to the viscountcy and other titles upon the death of his father. He sat in the House of Lords as a Conservative until 1999 when the right of most hereditary peers to seats was removed by the House of Lords Act 1999.

== Business career ==
Marchwood worked for Cadbury Schweppes between 1958 and 1985, when he became managing director of Moët & Chandon (London).

== Marriages and children ==
On 26 September 1964, Marchwood married firstly Tessa Jane Norris, daughter of Wilfred Francis Norris. They had three sons:

- Peter George Worsley Penny, 4th Viscount Marchwood (born 8 October 1965)
- Hon Nicholas Mark Staveley Penny (born 17 December 1967)
- Hon Edward James Frederick Penny (born 26 June 1970)

Marchwood married secondly Sylvia Kathleen Willis Fleming Bastin, daughter of Major General George Edward Restalic Bastin, on 13 December 2001. There were no children from this marriage.

== Death ==
Marchwood died on 3 October 2022, at the age of 86, and was succeeded in the viscountcy and other titles by his eldest son, Peter. Lady Marchwood died in 2023.
