= Thomas Skewes-Cox =

British politician

Skewes-Cox in 1895.

Sir Thomas Skewes-Cox (1849 – 15 October 1912) was a British Conservative Party politician.

He was born in Worth, Sussex to a farmer and his wife born in Llansantffraid-ym-Mechain. Having pre-marriage lived with parents at Townshend Villas, Richmond the entry of the public probate calendars and Who's Who records he lived at The Manor House, Petersham where he died. He simultaneously, when on London business, lived at 8 Lancaster Place, Strand. He married Jessie Warne in 1882 and had three sons, one daughter. He was a solicitor from 1881; chairman of the Isleworth Brewery; was a Magistrate, Alderman, and Mayor of Richmond, and Alderman of Surrey County Council; Chairman of Richmond Horticultural Society; Director of Richmond Royal Horse Show Society; and Conservator of River Thames.

He was Member of Parliament (MP) for the Kingston-upon-Thames which covered Kingston, its main suburbs and Richmond, Kew, Sheen and Mortlake from 1895 to 1906. Hansard lists 44 contributions spread across all years in the period 1895 to 1905.

In 1902, Skewes-Cox opened a new wing at the Kingston Institute.

He enrolled in the Carlton and Badminton clubs. His assets were probated in 1913, by executor, "Dame Jessie Skewes-Cox, widow", at £5050 who died 1930 with probated assets of £1,001 (equivalent to about £80,000 in 2023). Her executor was retired Major Thomas E. Skewes-Cox (1884-1971).

== Notes ==
Parliament of the United Kingdom
Preceded by Sir Richard Temple	Member of Parliament for Kingston; 1895 – 1906	Succeeded by George Cave
