= Richard Carnac Temple =

Indian-born British commissioner

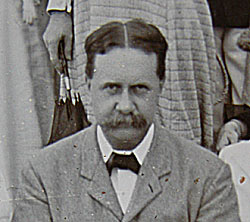
Richard Carnac Temple, c. 1900

Sir Richard Carnac Temple, 2nd Baronet, CB, CIE, GCStJ, FBA, FSA (15 October 1850 – 3 March 1931) was an Indian-born British administrator and the Chief Commissioner of the Andaman and Nicobar Islands and an anthropological writer.

== Early years ==
Richard Carnac Temple was born in Allahabad, India, on 15 October 1850. He was the eldest son of Sir Richard Temple (1826–1902), a baronet, and his first wife, Charlotte Frances (née Martindale, d. 1855). His father was from The Nash in Kempsey, Worcestershire and was at that time working as a civil servant in India. His father eventually served as Governor of Bombay Presidency (1877–80), a position that had also been held by Richard Carnac Temple's great-grandfather, Sir James Rivett Carnac between 1838 and 1841.

== Military and administrative career ==
After education at Harrow School and, from 1868, at Trinity Hall, Cambridge, Temple was commissioned in the Royal Scots Fusiliers in 1871. He was transferred to the British Indian Army in 1877, being mentioned in despatches while serving with the 38th Dogras in the Second Anglo-Afghan War of 1878–79. By this time, he had risen from his original rank of ensign to that of lieutenant in the Bengal Staff Corps.

Temple was then transferred to the 1st Gurkha Regiment and appointed a cantonment magistrate in 1879 in Punjab Province. It was now that he began to take what became his abiding interest in the folklore, history and ethnology of India. Promoted to captain in 1881, he served in the Third Burmese War from 1885 and as a consequence, in 1887, was given charge of Mandalay following the removal of king Thibaw.

Temple became a major in 1891 and was appointed President of the Rangoon municipality and also its Port-Commissioner. While based there he established various volunteer forces, including the Rangoon Naval Volunteers. Subsequently, from 1895 until his retirement in 1904, he was Chief Commissioner of the Andaman and Nicobar Islands. He was also Superintendent of the penal settlement at Port Blair. His final promotion was in 1897, when he attained the rank of lieutenant-colonel.

== Later career ==
Temple had succeeded to the baronetcy created for his father on 15 March 1902 upon the death of his father. It was after this and during his retirement that he dedicated himself to writing. He lived at The Nash from 1904 and continued writing after 1921, when ill-health and domestic circumstances forced him to move away from Britain to spend much of his time living in hotels around Territet in Vaud, Switzerland. The lavish lifestyle of his son and the high taxation introduced during the First World War caused him such financial difficulties that he sold The Nash in 1926.

Temple had been honoured as a Companion of the Order of the Indian Empire in 1894, recognising his work in India, and in 1913 he was President of the anthropological section of the British Association. In 1916, he was appointed a Companion of the Order of the Bath in recognition of his involvement with the Joint Committee of the St. John Ambulance Association and British Red Cross that operated during World War I. Elected a Fellow of the British Academy in 1925, he was also appointed a Bailiff Grand Cross of the Order of St. John of Jerusalem in 1927 and a Fellow of the Society of Antiquaries of London. He served as a Justice of the Peace and as a Deputy-Lieutenant of Worcestershire.

He was chairman of the Standing Council of the Baronetage and was appointed a member of the Home Departmental Committee to enquire into the Status of Baronets, was Deputy Chairman of the Military Home Hospital Reserve, Chairman of the St. John Ambulance Association, and Chairman of the Worcester County Association under the new Territorial Forces Act.

== Anthropology ==
Temple was an amateur anthropologist. He assembled collections for the British Museum and the Pitt Rivers Museum (Oxford) and established a small museum in his home in Kempsey but sold much of this in 1921.

He was a member of the Council of the Royal Asiatic Society, the Asiatic Society of Bengal, the Philological Society, the Folklore Society and the Royal Anthropological Institute. In 1886, he was elected as a member to the American Philosophical Society. He was a silver medalist of the Royal Society of Arts. He was sometime President of the Bombay Anthropological Society. He was elected an Honorary Fellow of Trinity Hall in 1908 and at the time of his death was serving as a vice-president of the Hakluyt Society, upon the Council of which he had served continuously since soon after retirement.

=== Criticism ===
Indian ethnographer, folklorist, post-colonial theorist and educator Sadhana Naithani originated the term "colonizer-folklorist" to describe Temple in an article.

== Writings ==
Temple joined the Folklore Society in 1885 and among the papers he published in its journal was The science of folk-lore (1886). He wrote various works often dealing with the religions and geography of India. He believed that a knowledge of local folklore was useful both to ruler and ruled. He wrote in 1914:

The practices and beliefs included under the general head of Folk-lore make up the daily life of the natives of our great dependency, control their feelings, and underlie many of their actions. We foreigners cannot hope to understand them rightly unless we deeply study them, and it must be remembered that close acquaintance and a right understanding begets sympathy, and sympathy begets good government.

He wrote The Andaman Language, published in conjunction with E. H. Man in 1887. Seven years later in collaboration with Flora Annie Steel, an Anglo-Indian novelist, he wrote Wideawake Stories, a collection of Indian folk-tales. Later, he was responsible for the production of Legends of the Punjab, in the vernacular with translation, in three volumes, which were published between 1883 and 1890, and The Thirty-Seven Nats, a study of animism in Burma, in 1906, a highly illustrated volume; edited Fallon's Devil-Worship of the Tuluvas in 1897. His book The Thirty-Seven Nats was influential in the study of Burmese folk religion.

For the Hakluyt Society, Temple was editor of two works of seventeenth-century travels: Thomas Bowrey's A Geographical Account of the Countries Round the Bay of Bengal, 1669-1679 (1905), and the manuscripts of Peter Mundy, titled The Travels of Peter Mundy in Europe and Asia, 1608-1667 (1907–28). In addition, in 1911 he published The Diaries of Streynsham Master, 1675–1680. He was also editor and proprietor of the Indian Antiquary since 1884. He founded and edited Panjab Notes and Queries from 1883 until 1887.

== Family ==
On 18 March 1880, Temple married Agnes Fanny Searle while based at Port Blair in the Andaman Islands. They had two daughters and a son, Sir Richard Durand Temple (1880–1962). He died on 3 March 1931 at Territet, Switzerland, and his wife died in 1943. His son succeeded him as the third baronet.

== Selected publications ==
- A Dictionary of Hindustani Proverbs. (Ed.) Medical Hall Press, Banares, 1886.
- The Andaman Language (with E. H. Man), 1887.
- Legends of the Punjab
- The Thirty-Seven Nats
- A Bird's-Eye View of Picturesque India, 1898
- Letters and Character Sketches from the House of Commons. John Murray. 1912.
- Anthropology as a Practical Science. G. Bell & Sons, London, 1914.
- Devil-Worship of the Tuluvas (editor, orig. Fallon)
- A Geographical Account of Countries Round the Bay of Bengal, 1669 to 1679. Cambridge, Printed for the Hakluyt Society. 1895. (Editor, originally by Thomas Bowrey)
- The Travels of Peter Mundy, 1608-67. Vol. 3. Hakluyt Society. 1919.
- The Word of Lalla the Prophetess. Cambridge University Press. 1924.
- The Travels of Peter Mundy, 1608-67. Vol. 4. Hakluyt Society. 1925.
- An Appreciation of Drake's Achievement in Penzer, N. M., ed. (1926). The World Encompassed, and Analogous Contemporary Documents concerning Sir Francis Drake's Circumnavigation of the World. Argonaut Press.
- The Papers of Thomas Bowrey, 1669-1713. Hakluyt Press. 1927.
- Foreword to Panikkar, K. M. (1929). Malabar and the Portuguese; Being a History of the Relations of the Portuguese with Malabar from 1500 to 1663. Bombay: D. B. Taraporevala Sons & Co.
- The Diaries of Streynsham Master, 1675-1680: And Other Contemporary Papers Relating Thereto. Vol. 2. J. Murray. 1911.

Government offices
Preceded by Norman Horsford	Chief Commissioner of the Andaman and Nicobar Islands; 1894–1904	Succeeded by William Merk
Baronetage of the United Kingdom
Preceded by Richard Temple	Baronet (of The Nash); 1902–1931	Succeeded by Richard Durand Temple
