= 1915 Kingston by-election =

UK Parliamentary by-election

The 1915 Kingston by-election was held on 16 November 1915. The by-election was held due to the incumbent Conservative MP, George Cave, becoming Solicitor General for England and Wales. It was retained by Cave.
