= English and Malayo Dictionary =

English-Malay dictionary compiled in 1701

The English and Malayo Dictionary
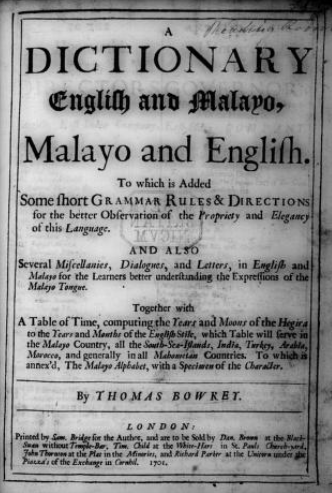
- Author: Thomas Bowrey
- Language: English-Malay
- Genre: Dictionary
- Published: 1701
- Publisher: Sam Bridge

The English and Malayo Dictionary is a historical Malay dictionary. It was the first Malay-English dictionary to be written, and was compiled by Thomas Bowrey, a British merchant, and published in 1701.

== Background ==
Thomas Bowrey was born in 1650 and in 1669, he went to Fort St George, Madras, India, and became a merchantman sailing around the East Indies trading in spices, opium, cloth, gold, jewels, and slaves.

== Writing ==
In 1688, after trading in the East Indies for 19 years, he returned to England on the Bangla Merchant and during the voyage wrote the first English-Malay dictionary which was designed as a reference book for merchants trading in the region, as he later writes in the preface:

"In the year One Thousand Six Hundred Eighty Eight, I embarked at Fort St George as a passenger on the Bangla Merchant bound for England, which proving a long voyage, and I being out of employment, did at my leisure time, set down all that came into my memory of the Malayo language, which together with some help that I have attained since, has furnished me with so much of that language as I think may be of great use to trade and conversation in the Malayo Country, or any of the South Sea Islands in which countries do a great a part of the trade of India is negotiated and capable of being much improved.”

After completing a draft manuscript around the end of the 17th century, Bowrey presented it to the directors of the East India Company, and it was taken up by two linguists, Thomas Hyde and Thomas Marshall. Published in London in 1701 as “A Dictionary: English and Malayo, Malayo and English”, the first such dictionary included 597 pages of words and definitions, with accent marks added for pronunciation, a section on Malay grammar, and maps where the language was spoken, and became the standard reference work until the end of the 18th century when James Howison published a new dictionary in 1801.
