= John Boyd-Carpenter, Baron Boyd-Carpenter =

British politician (1908–1998)

The Right Honourable The Lord Boyd-Carpenter PC DL
- Photograph from 1949

Chief Secretary to the Treasury
- In office 16 July 1962 – 15 October 1964
- Monarch: Elizabeth II
- Prime Minister: Harold Macmillan; Alec Douglas-Home
- Chancellor: Reginald Maudling
- Preceded by: Henry Brooke
- Succeeded by: John Diamond
Ministerial offices 1951-64
Paymaster General
In office 16 July 1962 – 15 October 1964
| Prime Minister | Harold Macmillan; Alec Douglas-Home |
| Preceded by | Henry Brooke |
| Succeeded by | George Wigg |
Minister of Pensions and National Insurance
In office 20 December 1955 – 16 July 1962
| Prime Minister | Anthony Eden; Harold Macmillan |
| Preceded by | Osbert Peake |
| Succeeded by | Niall Macpherson |
Minister of Transport and Civil Aviation
In office 28 July 1954 – 20 December 1955
| Prime Minister | Winston Churchill; Anthony Eden |
| Preceded by | Alan Lennox-Boyd |
| Succeeded by | Harold Watkinson |
Financial Secretary to the Treasury
In office 30 October 1951 – 28 July 1954
| Prime Minister | Winston Churchill |
| Preceded by | Douglas Jay |
| Succeeded by | Henry Brooke |

Member of the House of Lords Lord Temporal
- In office 1 May 1972 – 11 July 1998; Life Peerage

Member of Parliament for Kingston-upon-Thames
- In office 5 July 1945 – 31 March 1972
- Preceded by: Percy Royds
- Succeeded by: Norman Lamont

Personal details
- Born: John Archibald Boyd-Carpenter; 2 June 1908 Harrogate, West Riding of Yorkshire, England
- Died: 11 July 1998 (aged 90) Crux Easton, Hampshire, England
- Party: Conservative
- Spouse: Margaret Hall (m. 1937)
- Children: 3
- Education: Stowe School; Balliol College, Oxford; Middle Temple

John Archibald Boyd-Carpenter, Baron Boyd-Carpenter, PC, DL (2 June 1908 – 11 July 1998) was a British Conservative politician. He was the Member of Parliament for Kingston-upon-Thames from 1945 to 1972, when he was made a life peer. He served in several ministerial roles throughout the Conservative governments of 1951 to 1964, and was Chief Secretary to the Treasury and Paymaster General from 1962 to 1964.

== Early life ==
John Archibald Boyd-Carpenter was born in Harrogate on 2 June 1908. He was the only son of Conservative politician Sir Archibald Boyd-Carpenter MP and his wife Annie Dugdale. His grandfather was William Boyd Carpenter, an Anglican bishop. He was educated at Stowe School, Buckinghamshire, and at Balliol College, Oxford, where he was President of the Oxford Union in 1930. He graduated with a BA in History, and a Diploma in Economics in 1931. He was Harmsworth Law Scholar at the Middle Temple in 1933 and called to Bar the next year, and practised in the London and South-East Circuit.

== War service ==
Boyd-Carpenter joined the Scots Guards in 1940 and held various staff appointments, including with the Allied Military Government in Italy, retiring with the rank of Major.

== Political career ==
Boyd-Carpenter contested the Limehouse district for the London County Council in 1934. He was elected as Conservative Member of Parliament for Kingston-upon-Thames in 1945, holding the seat until 1972, when he was raised to the peerage.

He held ministerial office as Financial Secretary to the Treasury from 1951 to 1954. In 1954 he was promoted to Minister of Transport and Civil Aviation and appointed a Privy Counsellor. In December 1955 he was moved to the position of Minister of Pensions and National Insurance, which he held until July 1962 (the young Margaret Thatcher served under him as Parliamentary Secretary, her first ministerial job, from October 1961). He was then Chief Secretary to the Treasury and Paymaster General from 1962 to 1964. In this capacity, he approved key funding for the Concorde, and in his later role as chair of the Civil Aviation Authority (CAA), he would be a passenger on the first Concorde flight, in 1976.

When Alec Douglas-Home became Prime Minister in October 1963, he initially promised Boyd-Carpenter the job of Leader of the House of Commons, but in the end the job went to Selwyn Lloyd who was returning to government from the backbenches. In 1971, Lloyd was elected Speaker of the House, another job that Boyd-Carpenter had desired; The Times said his failure to become speaker was a "major disappointment" of his political career.

Following the Conservative defeat in 1964, he served as Opposition Front Bench Spokesman on Housing, Local Government and Land, 1964–66, and as Chairman of the Public Accounts Committee from 1964 to 1970. He later held a number of Party and business appointments.

He was appointed a life peer on 1 May 1972, as Baron Boyd-Carpenter, of Crux Easton in the County of Southampton. His successor at the ensuing byelection was Norman Lamont, the future Chancellor of the Exchequer under John Major.

As the first Chairman of the UK's CAA, Boyd-Carpenter was in charge at the time of the collapse of the UK airline Court Line and their subsidiary Clarksons Travel Group in August 1974.

== Personal life ==
In 1937, Boyd-Carpenter married Margaret ("Peggy") Mary, daughter of Lieutenant-Colonel George Leslie Hall, OBE, of the Royal Engineers. Their son, Thomas Boyd-Carpenter, was himself knighted following his military and public service careers. One of the couple's two daughters, Sarah Hogg, Baroness Hogg, married Douglas Hogg, 3rd Viscount Hailsham, and is a life peer in her own right. Boyd-Carpenter had residences in London and Crux Easton, Hampshire.

Boyd-Carpenter died from cancer at his home in Crux Easton on 11 July 1998, at the age of 90.

== Arms ==
Coat of arms of John Boyd-Carpenter, Baron Boyd-Carpenter
| Crest On a wreath a globe in a frame all Or. Escutcheon Paly of six Argent and Gules on a chevron Azure 3 cross crosslets Or. Supporters Two horses party-perfess embattled Argent and Gules. Motto "Per Acuta Belli" (Through the Asperities of War). |

Parliament of the United Kingdom
| Preceded by Sir Percy Royds | Member of Parliament for Kingston-upon-Thames; 1945–1972 | Succeeded by Norman Lamont |
Political offices
| Preceded by Douglas Jay | Financial Secretary to the Treasury; 1951–1954 | Succeeded by Henry Brooke |
| Preceded by Alan Lennox-Boyd | Minister of Transport and Civil Aviation; 1954–1955 | Succeeded by Harold Watkinson |
| Preceded by Osbert Peake | Minister of Pensions and National Insurance; 1955–1962 | Succeeded by Niall Macpherson |
| Preceded by Henry Brooke | Chief Secretary to the Treasury; 1962–1964 | Succeeded by John Diamond |
| Preceded by Henry Brooke | Paymaster General; 1962–1964 | Succeeded by George Wigg |
