= John Gordon Drummond Campbell =

British politician

Campbell in 1922.

John Gordon Drummond Campbell (15 February 1864 – 11 January 1935) was a British barrister and Conservative Party politician who served from 1918 to 1922 as the member of parliament (MP) for Kingston-upon-Thames in Surrey.

== Early life ==
He was the son of Colonel Archibald Neil Campbell of Craignish and was educated at Charterhouse School, from where he won a scholarship to Corpus Christi College, Oxford, gaining a first-class degree in classics. He was called to the bar at Lincoln's Inn in 1890, and was one of His Majesty's Inspector of Schools from 1892 to 1909. He worked for two or three years as educational adviser to King Chulalongkorn of Siam, writing a book Siam in the Twentieth Century (1902).

== Parliamentary career ==
A strong unionist and tariff reformer, Campbell first stood for Parliament at the January 1910 general election, when he was unsuccessful in the Mansfield division of Nottinghamshire, which was then a safe seat for the Liberal Party. He contested the December 1910 election in the more-winnable Eccles division of Lancashire, but failed to oust the sitting Liberal MP Sir George Pollard.

He won a seat on his third attempt, when he was elected at the 1918 general election as the Coalition Unionist MP for the safe seat of Kingston-upon-Thames, replacing the Home Secretary George Cave who had been ennobled as Viscount Cave. In August 1921, Campbell was one of 31 Unionist MPs dissatisfied with the Liberal-led Coalition Government who signed a manifesto pledging that after the next election they would hold themselves independent of any of the political parties on matters concerning the economy and finance.

By late 1922, Unionist discontent at the coalition led to a meeting at the Carlton Club in October 1922 where the Unionists decided to withdraw from the coalition. The collapse of the government triggered the 1922 general election, when Campbell stood down from the House of Commons, due to ill-health.

Parliament of the United Kingdom
Preceded by Sir George Cave	Member of Parliament for Kingston-upon-Thames; 1918 – 1922	Succeeded by Sir Frederick Penny
