= Charles Royds =

Royal Navy admiral and deputy police commissioner (1876–1931)

Vice-Admiral Sir Charles Royds KBE CMG ADC FRGS
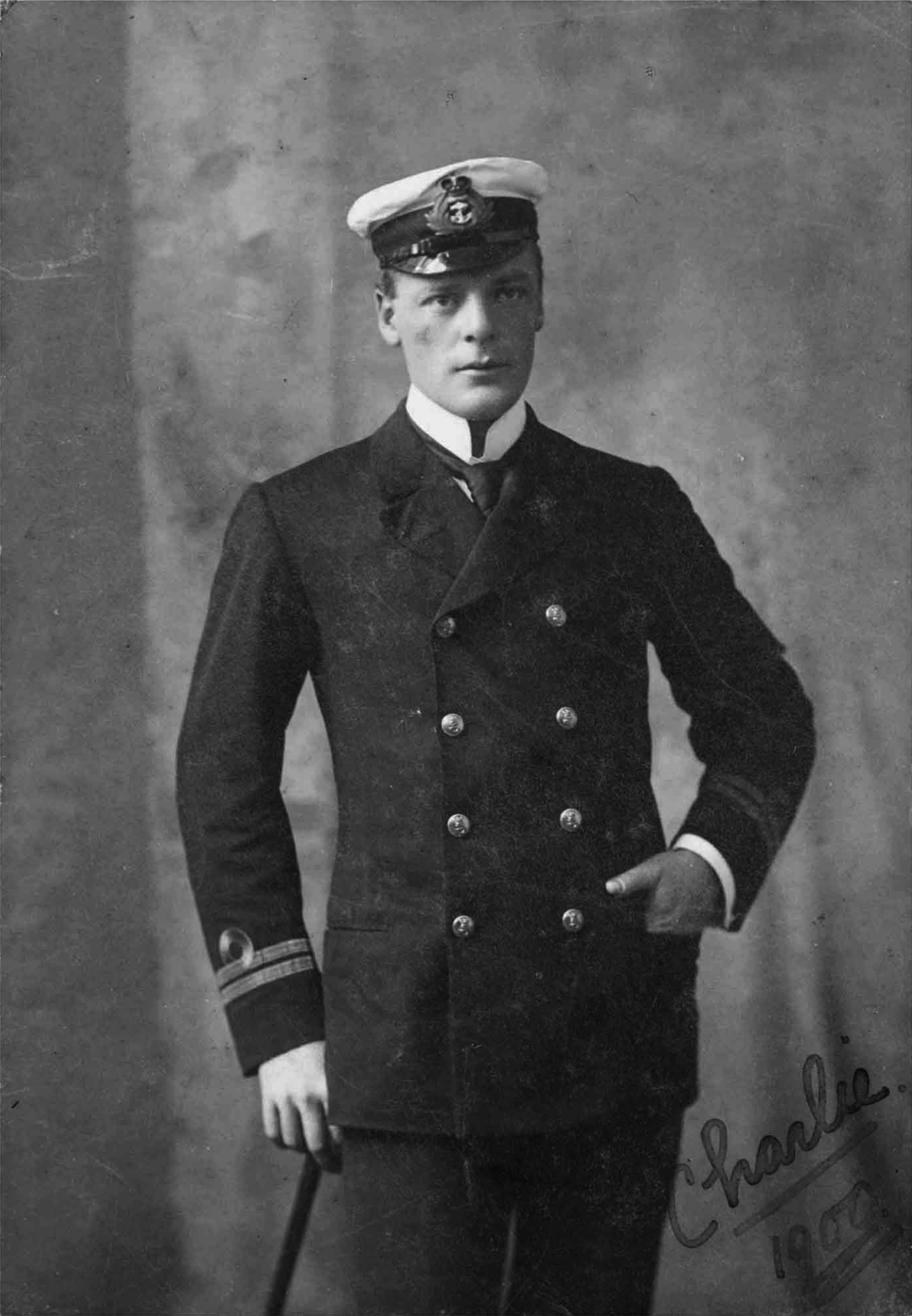
- Lieutenant Charles Royds RN, 1900

Deputy Commissioner of Police of the Metropolis
- In office 1 January 1926 – 5 January 1931

Assistant Commissioner of Police of the Metropolis "A"
- In office 1 January 1926 – 5 January 1931

Personal details
- Born: Charles William Rawson Royds; 1 February 1876 Rochdale, Lancashire, England
- Died: 5 January 1931 (aged 54) Charing Cross Hospital, London, England
- Spouse: Mary Louisa Blane (m. 1918)
- Relatives: Percy Royds (brother)
- Military career
- Allegiance: United Kingdom
- Branch: Royal Navy
- Service years: 1892–1925
- Rank: Vice-Admiral
- Units: HMS Immortalité; HMS Australia; HMS Barfleur; HMS Champion; RRS Discovery; HMS Bulwark; HMS King Edward VII; HMS Hercules; HMS Iron Duke
- Commands: HMS Emperor of India
- Conflicts: World War I

Vice-Admiral Sir Charles William Rawson Royds KBE CMG ADC FRGS (1 February 1876 – 5 January 1931) was a career Royal Navy officer who later served as Assistant Commissioner "A" of the London Metropolitan Police from 1926 to 1931. In this role, he was in charge of administration and uniformed operations and also carried the courtesy title of Deputy Commissioner.

Royds was born in Rochdale, Lancashire. He attended Eastman's Royal Naval Academy in Southsea before becoming a naval cadet in June 1892. In August 1892, he went to sea in the cruiser HMS Immortalité of the Channel Squadron. As a midshipman, he served in the cruisers HMS Australia and HMS Barfleur. In September 1896, he was commissioned as a sub-lieutenant. In 1897, he was appointed to the cruiser HMS Champion in the Training Squadron. In 1898, he received early promotion to lieutenant for his skilled command of a boat that picked up a man who had fallen overboard in the Baltic. In 1899 he sailed to the West Indies aboard HMS Crescent.

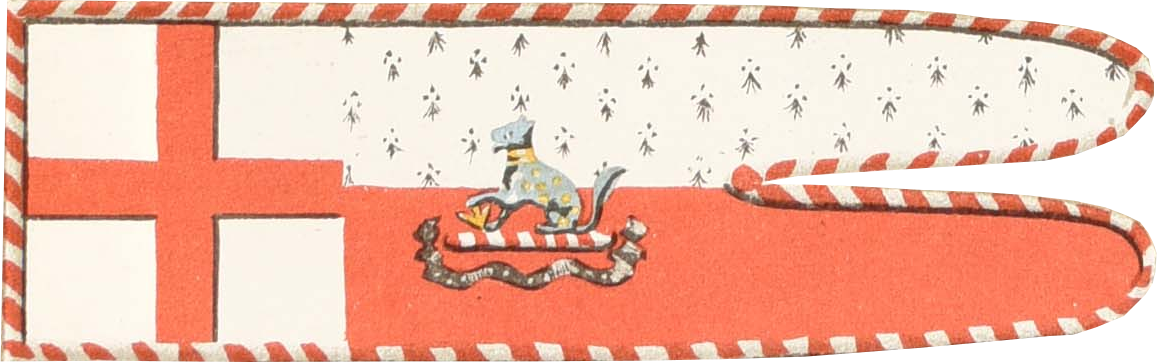
Sledge flag used by Royds in Antarctica during the Discovery Expedition

From 1901 to 1904, Royds was first lieutenant of the RRS Discovery on Robert Falcon Scott's National Antarctic Expedition. Cape Royds in Antarctica was named after him. He then joined the battleship HMS Bulwark in the Mediterranean, and in 1907 transferred to HMS King Edward VII in the Channel Fleet. In June 1909, he became executive officer in the rank of commander. In January 1911, he became the first executive officer of the battleship HMS Hercules, and in August 1913 transferred to the same post in HMS Iron Duke, another new battleship and flagship of Admiral Jellicoe.

On 31 December 1914, Royds was promoted to captain and became flag captain to Admiral Sir Stanley Colville, commanding Orkney and Shetland. Six months later, he was given command of the battleship HMS Emperor of India. He remained in her until January 1919, and was appointed Companion of St Michael and St George (CMG) on 3 June 1919 for his war service. He served at Dover for a time and then was the last captain of the Royal Naval College, Osborne, from 2 January 1921 until its closure in May 1921. He then became director of physical training and sports at the Admiralty, from 17 May 1921, succeeding his elder brother, Percy (himself later an admiral). From October 1923 to 15 October 1925, he was commodore of the Royal Naval Barracks at Devonport, his last naval appointment.

On 1 January 1926, he succeeded Sir James Olive as Assistant Commissioner "A" and Deputy Commissioner of the Metropolitan Police. In March 1926, he retired from the Royal Navy on promotion to rear-admiral. On 3 June 1929, he was appointed Knight Commander of the Order of the British Empire (KBE) in the Metropolitan Police Centenary Honours, and in the same year was made an ADC to the King. On 23 May 1930, he was promoted to vice-admiral on the Retired List. Royds died suddenly while still in office as assistant commissioner, and while acting as commissioner during General Byng's absence on sick leave. He suffered a heart attack while attending a rehearsal of the Strauss Ball at the Savoy Hotel and was rushed to Charing Cross Hospital, but was pronounced dead on arrival.

Royds was a very large man, standing well over six feet tall. In 1918, he married the widowed Mary Louisa Blane, a former actress. They had a daughter named Minna Mary Jessica Royds.

== Footnotes ==
Police appointments
Preceded by Sir James Olive	Assistant Commissioner "A", Metropolitan Police; 1926–1931	Succeeded by Sir Trevor Bigham
Preceded by Sir James Olive	Deputy Commissioner of Police of the Metropolis; 1926–1931	Succeeded by Sir Trevor Bigham
