= James Olive =

Sir James Olive KBE

Deputy Commissioner of Police of the Metropolis
- In office 1 December 1922 – 31 December 1925

Assistant Commissioner of Police of the Metropolis "A"
- In office April 1920 – 31 December 1925

Personal details
- Born: James William Olive; 1856
- Died: 14 January 1942 (aged 85–86)
- Occupation: Police officer

Sir James William Olive KBE (1856 – 14 January 1942) was Assistant Commissioner "A" of the London Metropolitan Police from 1920 to 1925. As such, he was in charge of administration and uniformed operations and was the Commissioner's deputy. From 1922, he became the first officer formally to be granted the title of Deputy Commissioner.

== Life and career ==
Olive joined the Metropolitan Police as a Constable in September 1872. He was initially posted to "A" Division in Whitehall, but later transferred to Scotland Yard as an administrative officer. He was promoted to Sergeant in January 1877, Inspector in July 1886, Sub-Divisional Inspector in December 1890, and Chief Inspector in June 1893. In May 1903, he was promoted to Superintendent and took command of Thames Division, responsible for patrolling the River Thames. In 1905, after reorganising the whole way in which the river was policed, he was transferred to the command of "X" Division (Kilburn). In October 1918, he was promoted to Chief Constable in charge of the North-Western District, becoming the first former Constable to be promoted past the rank of Superintendent in the Uniform Branch. He was appointed Commander of the Order of the British Empire (CBE) in March 1920, having already been appointed Member of the Order of the British Empire (MBE).

In April 1920, Olive was appointed Assistant Commissioner "A". On 1 December 1922, he became the first officer to be appointed Deputy Commissioner, although this was only a courtesy title and he also remained Assistant Commissioner "A". He was appointed Knight Commander of the Order of the British Empire (KBE) in the 1924 Birthday Honours. He retired on 31 December 1925 after 53 years' service (which may well make him the longest-serving officer in Metropolitan Police history), and died at his home in Kilburn in 1942.

A month after he joined the police, Olive was (as a musician) a founder member of the Police Minstrels, who put on entertainments at police stations. He later became their president.

Police appointments
Preceded by William Horwood	Assistant Commissioner "A", Metropolitan Police; 1920–1925	Succeeded by Charles Royds
Preceded by First incumbent	Deputy Commissioner of Police of the Metropolis; 1922–1925	Succeeded by Charles Royds
