= Percy Royds =

British Royal Navy admiral & politician (1874-1955)

Admiral Sir Percy Royds CB CMG ADC
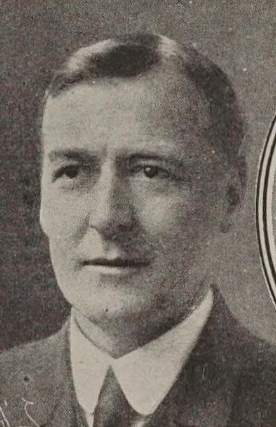
- Royds as a captain

Member of Parliament for Kingston-upon-Thames
- In office 1937–1945

Personal details
- Born: Percy Molyneux Rawson Royds; 5 April 1874 Rochdale, Lancashire, England
- Died: 25 March 1955 (aged 80)
- Spouse: Florence Yarrow (m. 1898; died 1948)
- Relatives: Charles Royds (brother)
- Occupation: Royal Navy officer
- Military career
- Allegiance: United Kingdom
- Branch: Royal Navy
- Service years: 1887-1927
- Rank: Admiral
- Conflicts: Boxer Rebellion; World War I; Battle of Jutland; Zeebrugge Raid
- Awards: Mentioned in dispatches

Rugby union career
Senior career
Years	Team	Apps	(Points)
- Blackheath
- Royal Navy
International career
Years	Team	Apps	(Points)
- Barbarians
–	England	3	

Admiral Sir Percy Molyneux Rawson Royds CB CMG ADC (5 April 1874 – 25 March 1955) was a British admiral and politician.

== Naval career ==
Royds was born in Rochdale, the son of Ernest Royds and the older brother of Charles Royds, also later an admiral. He was educated at Eastman's Royal Naval Academy in Southsea and joined HMS Prince of Wales, Dartmouth as a Naval Cadet in 1887. He was promoted lieutenant in 1895 and joined HMS Excellent as a gunnery officer. In 1899 he served in the Boxer Rebellion in China as the first lieutenant of HMS Arethusa.

In 1904, Royds joined Devonport Barracks as a gunnery officer. In 1905 he was promoted commander at the unusually early age of thirty and joined the cruiser HMS Europa. He later transferred to another cruiser, HMS Argyll. In 1908, he was appointed Superintendent of Physical Training at Portsmouth. This was appropriate, since he had once played rugby union for Blackheath, the Barbarians and the Royal Navy and had appeared three times for England. In 1910 he was elected naval representative on the Rugby Football Union and served for many years, latterly as a selector representing Kent. He also served on the committee of the Royal Tournament and the Olympic Council.

In 1912, he was promoted captain and took a course at the Royal Naval War College in Portsmouth. The following year he took command of the light cruiser HMS Bellona. He was still commanding her when the First World War broke out, and later transferred to the light cruiser HMS Canterbury, which he commanded at the Battle of Jutland on 31 May – 1 June 1916. For this action, he was mentioned in dispatches and made a Companion of St Michael and St George (CMG). On St George's day, 23 April 1918, he was present at the great naval raid on Zeebrugge and Ostend.

After the war, Royds was appointed Captain-in-Charge of the Royal Naval College, Greenwich. In 1920 he became the Royal Navy's first Director of Physical Training and Sports. In 1921 he was succeeded in this post by his younger brother, Captain Charles Royds, and took command of the battleship HMS Malaya in the Atlantic Fleet. On 19 June 1921 he was appointed an ADC to the King.

He only remained in command of Malaya until 22 April 1922 and was promoted to rear-admiral on 12 May 1922.

In 1922 he was elected president of the Royal Navy and Royal Marines Rugby Union.

On 1 December 1923 he became Admiral-Superintendent of Chatham Dockyard. He was created a Companion of the Bath (CB) in 1924. He relinquished the appointment of Admiral-Superintendent on 7 December 1925. On 1 August 1927 he was promoted vice-admiral and retired the following day.

In 1927 he was made president of the Rugby Football Union.

In 1932 he was promoted admiral on the retired list.

== Political career ==
On 1 July 1937, Royds was elected at a by-election as the Conservative Member of Parliament (MP) for Kingston-upon-Thames in a by-election, having been president of the local Conservative and Unionist Association for several years. He was knighted for political and public services on 1 January 1938 and retired in 1945. He also served on Surrey County Council for some years.

== Family ==
In 1898, Royds married Florence Yarrow (died 1948). They had one son and three daughters.

== Notes ==
Military offices
Preceded by Rear-Admiral Edward Kiddle	Admiral-Superintendent of Chatham Dockyard; 1923–1925	Succeeded by Rear-Admiral Charles Beaty-Pownall
Parliament of the United Kingdom
Preceded by Frederick Penny	Member of Parliament for Kingston-upon-Thames; 1937–1945	Succeeded by John Boyd-Carpenter
