= 1972 Kingston-upon-Thames by-election =

UK parliamentary by-election

The 1972 Kingston-upon-Thames by-election of 4 May 1972 was held after Conservative Member of Parliament (MP) John Boyd-Carpenter was appointed chairman of the Civil Aviation Authority. The seat was retained by the Conservatives, with Norman Lamont winning. He held the seat for 25 years until it was abolished in 1997. (Lamont is best known for serving as Chancellor of the Exchequer 1990–1993, during the Premiership of John Major.)

== Result ==
Kingston-upon-Thames by-election, 1972
Party	Candidate	Votes	%	±%
Conservative	Norman Lamont	16,679	52.32	−4.35
Labour	Anthony Judge	9,892	31.03	−0.64
Liberal	Stephen Wells	3,601	11.30	−0.36
Anti-Common Market Conservative	Edgar Scruby	1,705	5.35	New
Majority		6,787	21.29	−3.71
Turnout		31,877		
Conservative hold		Swing		

== Previous election ==
General election 1970: Kingston-Upon Thames
Party	Candidate	Votes	%	±%
Conservative	John Boyd-Carpenter	23,426	56.67	
Labour	RH Crockett	13,090	31.67	
Liberal	SJ Wells	4,822	11.66	
Majority		10,336	25.00	
Turnout		41,338	69.13	
Conservative hold		Swing		
