= Norman Lamont =

British politician (born 1942)

The Right Honourable The Lord Lamont of Lerwick PC
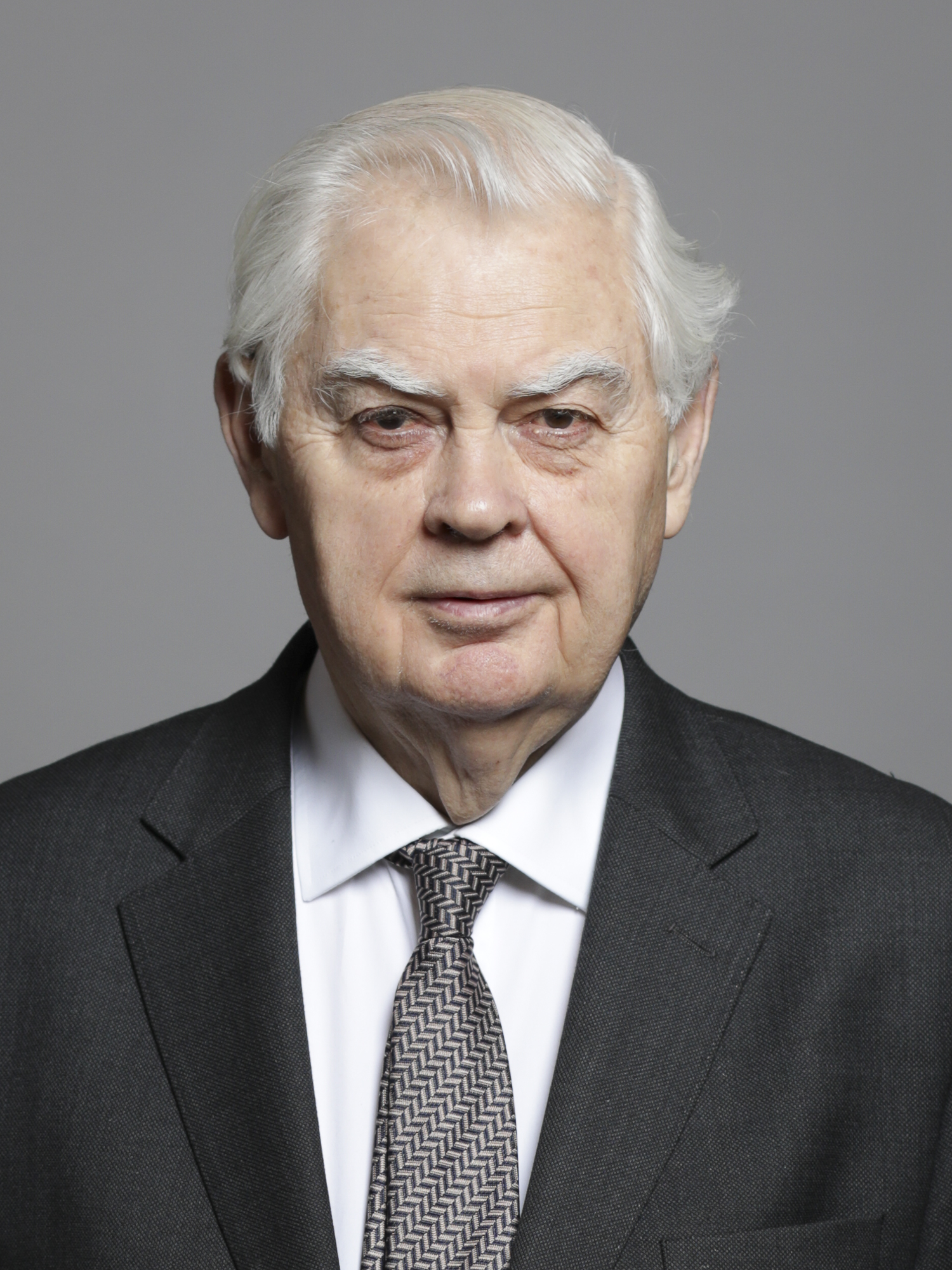
- Official portrait, 2019

Chancellor of the Exchequer
- In office 28 November 1990 – 27 May 1993
- Prime Minister: John Major
- Preceded by: John Major
- Succeeded by: Kenneth Clarke

Chief Secretary to the Treasury
- In office 24 July 1989 – 28 November 1990
- Prime Minister: Margaret Thatcher
- Chancellor: Nigel Lawson; John Major
- Preceded by: John Major
- Succeeded by: David Mellor

Financial Secretary to the Treasury
- In office 21 May 1986 – 24 July 1989
- Prime Minister: Margaret Thatcher
- Preceded by: John Moore
- Succeeded by: Peter Lilley

Minister of State for Defence Procurement
- In office 2 September 1985 – 21 May 1986
- Prime Minister: Margaret Thatcher
- Preceded by: Adam Butler
- Succeeded by: The Lord Trefgarne

Minister of State for Trade and Industry
- In office 14 September 1981 – 2 September 1985
- Prime Minister: Margaret Thatcher
- Preceded by: Norman Tebbit
- Succeeded by: Peter Morrison

Parliamentary Under-Secretary of State for Energy
- In office 7 May 1979 – 5 September 1981
- Prime Minister: Margaret Thatcher
- Preceded by: Alex Eadie
- Succeeded by: David Mellor

Member of the House of Lords
- Lord Temporal
- Life peerage 24 July 1998

Member of Parliament for Kingston-upon-Thames
- In office 4 May 1972 – 8 April 1997
- Preceded by: John Boyd-Carpenter
- Succeeded by: Constituency abolished

Personal details
- Born: Norman Stewart Hughson Lamont; 8 May 1942 (age 84) Lerwick, Shetland, Scotland
- Party: Conservative
- Spouse: Rosemary White (m. 1971; div. 1999)
- Children: 2
- Education: Loretto School
- Alma mater: Fitzwilliam College, Cambridge
- Occupation: Politician

Norman Stewart Hughson Lamont, Baron Lamont of Lerwick (born 8 May 1942) is a British politician and former Conservative MP for Kingston-upon-Thames. He served as Chancellor of the Exchequer from 1990 until 1993. He was created a life peer in 1998. Lamont was a supporter of the Eurosceptic organisation Leave Means Leave.

== Early life ==
Norman Stewart Hughson Lamont was born in Lerwick, in the Shetland Islands, on 8 May 1942, where his father Daniel Lamont OBE was the islands' surgeon. In 1953, he moved south with his parents to Grimsby, Lincolnshire, after his father took up a position at Scartho Road Infirmary. He was privately educated at Loretto School, Musselburgh, Scotland, and read economics at Fitzwilliam College, Cambridge, where he was Chairman of the Cambridge University Conservative Association and President of the Cambridge Union Society in 1964.

== Corporate career ==
Before entering Parliament, Lamont worked for N M Rothschild & Sons, the investment bank, and became director of Rothschild Asset Management.

In addition to his role as a working peer, Lamont is currently a director of and a consultant to various companies in the financial sector. He is a director of the hedge fund company RAB Capital, Balli Group plc (commodities trading house), and he is an advisor to Rotch Property Group. He is also a director of a number of investment funds. In December 2008 he joined the board of Phorm, an online behavioural advertising company, and he is a non-executive director of Balli Group PLC and the Honorary President of the British Romanian Chamber of Commerce, and Chairman of the British Iranian Chamber of Commerce.

== Early political career ==
=== Member of Parliament ===
Lamont stood as a candidate for Member of Parliament in the June 1970 general election for Kingston upon Hull East. He was defeated by John Prescott, who went on to become Tony Blair's Deputy Prime Minister. Two years later, on 4 May 1972, Lamont won a by-election to become MP for Kingston-upon-Thames.

=== Junior minister ===
Lamont served in successive governments under Margaret Thatcher and John Major for a total of 14 years, in the Departments of Energy, Industry, Defence and the Treasury. In 1986, he moved to the Treasury, first as Financial Secretary to the Treasury, then Chief Secretary to the Treasury (succeeding John Major in the latter job on Major's promotion to Foreign Secretary in July 1989) under Chancellor Nigel Lawson, whom he tried unsuccessfully to persuade not to resign from the government on the morning of 26 October 1989 – Lawson resigned that evening. Lamont remained as Chief Secretary to the Treasury under Major's chancellorship. In this position, he acquiesced in Major's decision to join the European Exchange Rate Mechanism (ERM) at a central parity of 2.95 Deutschmarks to the Pound, although neither he nor any other Cabinet ministers were involved or informed about the decision before it had been made.

The decision to join the ERM was announced on Friday 5 October 1990, the last trading day before the week of the Conservative party conference. Shortly afterwards he successfully managed Major's election campaign to succeed Margaret Thatcher as party leader and Prime Minister. In her memoirs, Thatcher listed Lamont along with six other Cabinet ministers as a potential successor to her. During the leadership election, Lamont clashed angrily in private with Lawson who preferred Michael Heseltine as Thatcher's successor, phoning Lawson up to remind him of his caustic remarks made about Heseltine's economic policies. Lamont eventually slammed the phone down on Lawson in temper, though he later wrote to Lawson to offer an apology.

On 16 May 1991, Lamont stated in parliament that "Rising unemployment and the recession have been the price that we have had to pay to get inflation down. That price is well worth paying." The remark is regularly, but not always approvingly, recalled by commentators and other politicians. Seven months before Lamont made the statement, inflation (as measured by the annual change in the Retail Price Index) reached 10.9%. In May 1991, inflation fell to 6.4%. A year after the Major government was reelected in the 1992 general election, winning the most votes of any political party in British electoral history, inflation fell to 4.3%, falling to 1.3% a year later. However the economy continued to contract until the third quarter of 1991. After economic growth resumed, the economy grew rapidly and by the third quarter of 1993, GDP was greater than the pre-recession peak in the second quarter of 1990.

== Chancellor of the Exchequer ==
Lamont replaced Major as Chancellor in Major's new Cabinet, thereby inheriting Major's exchange rate policy. In his memoirs, Lamont recalls a senior Treasury civil servant answering his question on why Britain had joined the ERM by replying, "It's politics," to which Lamont replied, "I don't think I would have given up the flexibility of the exchange rate." In public, Lamont justified the decision to join the ERM in terms of the government's counter-inflation strategy. In the House of Commons debate shortly after the pound joined the ERM, he argued that under a regime of floating exchange rates, the consequences of depreciating the currency had been short-lived in terms of output and competitiveness, "but have been lasting in terms of inflation. That is one of the reasons why the Government concluded that it would be right to join the ERM."

=== Fiscal policy ===
By the time Lamont was appointed Chancellor, the Conservative government's principal economic objective was to regain control of inflation. The Thatcher government had been elected in 1979 on a manifesto that had listed restoration of sound money as its first priority. Having peaked at 21.9% in 1980, inflation (as measured by the 12-month increase in the Retail Prices Index) fell to 3.3% at the beginning of 1988. However, controlling inflation through the targeting of the growth of the domestic money supply, as proposed in that manifesto, turned out to be more problematic than its authors had envisaged and during his time as Chancellor, Lawson had increasingly been drawn instead to targeting the exchange rate to provide an external monetary anchor. From its low point in February 1988, inflation rose with apparent inexorability: of the 31 months until it peaked at 10.9% in October 1990, there were only four months when inflation fell. In response, interest rates were progressively increased, doubling from 7.4% in June 1988 to 15% in October 1988, being cut by one point to 14% when the pound entered the ERM, the level of interest rates Lamont inherited as chancellor. As a result, the economy began to slow, contracting by 1.1% in the third quarter of 1990 and shrinking a further 0.7% in the final quarter of the year. Thus Lamont's period as Chancellor started with inflation at its highest level since 1982 and the economy in recession.

Asked at his first appearance as chancellor at the Treasury Select Committee whether he agreed with his predecessor's view on the depth and duration of the recession and not wishing to contradict Major, Lamont replied that "there are reasons why one could believe that it will be relatively short-lived and relatively shallow." In October 1991, based on CBI and Institute of Directors business surveys, he said "what we are seeing is the return of that vital ingredient – confidence. The green shoots of economic spring are appearing once again." The comment was widely criticised as premature. However, Gavyn Davies, then chief economist at Goldman Sachs, wrote in a newspaper article at the time of Lamont's removal from the Treasury that the "green shoots" speech had turned out to be "remarkably prescient. From that moment onwards, output stopped declining, and within a few months, it started to rise". Estimates of gross domestic product show the trough of the recession occurring in the fourth quarter of 1991, with sustained growth resuming in the third quarter of 1992, when GDP grew 0.4% compared to the second quarter.

=== Negotiating the Maastricht Treaty ===
On succeeding Thatcher, the Major government had to decide its position on the negotiations on European economic and monetary union (EMU); this would lead to the Maastricht Treaty. It had been Thatcher's opposition to EMU which triggered the end of her premiership. Like Thatcher, Lamont was a long-standing opponent of EMU and the European single currency. In his memoirs, Lamont wrote that he was "horrified" when Ted Heath in 1972 announced Britain that it was accepting the Werner Plan for monetary union. Newly appointed as Chancellor, Lamont therefore supported Major's idea of Britain negotiating an opt-out from the single currency. Negotiations on the economic aspects of the proposed treaty began in earnest at the end of 1990 with monthly meetings of European finance ministers. At an Intergovernmental Conference held in Rome on 15 December 1990, Lamont declared, "I remain unconvinced that the potential benefits of a single currency are as great as its supporters allege."

In a minute to the Cabinet's Defence and Overseas Policy committee the following month, Lamont set out his three objectives for the negotiations: first, to ensure that Britain did not have to join the single currency; second, to ensure the opt-out was legally water-tight; and third, to ensure that during the period in the run-up to the single currency, there should be no binding obligations on Britain. In meeting the third of these, Lamont had to overcome the resistance of the prime minister and the foreign secretary, Douglas Hurd, who told Lamont: "I can't see what you are so worked up about. We are in the ERM. What difference does it make if it is in the Treaty?" Lamont decided to ignore their objections. At the next negotiating meeting on the treaty, he told his fellow European finance ministers that Britain would not accept membership of the ERM as a treaty obligation. As a result, the meeting agreed to remove it.

Lamont decided that the best way of securing the first two of his negotiating objectives was for Britain to draw up a protocol listing those parts of the treaty from which Britain would be exempted. When Wim Kok, the Dutch finance minister chairing the finance ministers' negotiations at Maastricht, decided that the meeting should review the British opt-out line-by-line, Lamont said the text was not negotiable. After Kok persevered, Lamont walked out of the meeting. In his absence, the protocol was endorsed without amendment.

=== Exchange Rate Mechanism exit ===
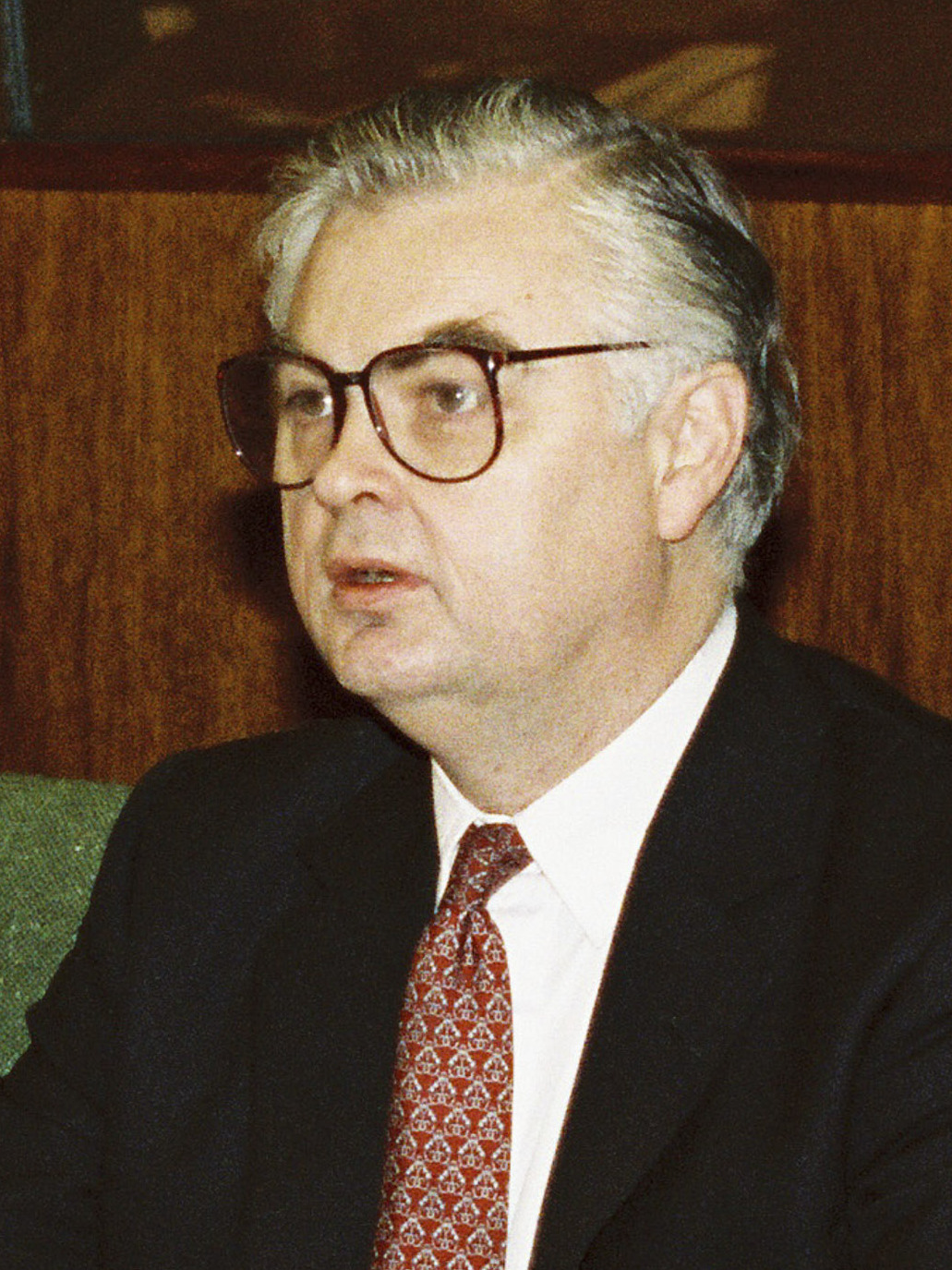
Lamont in 1992

Within the constraints of the ERM, sterling interest rates were cut seven times in 1991, falling from 14% to 10.5% in September, with inflation halving from 9.0% to 4.5% over the course of the year, leaving real interest rates just 0.5% lower. The scope for swifter cuts in interest rates was squeezed by an event that few had anticipated when Britain joined the ERM: based on OECD indices of consumer prices, inflation in Germany, which had been 2.7% in 1990, rose to 5.1% in 1992, whilst in Britain inflation fell from 7.0% to 4.3%. In response, the Bundesbank increased its discount rate from 6.0% in 1990 to 8.75% in July 1992, creating the conditions for the turbulence the ERM was to experience later that autumn.

Despite the Conservatives' surprise victory in the April 1992 general election, for these reasons, the ERM policy proved increasingly unsustainable and collapsed on Black Wednesday, when Lamont was forced to withdraw the pound from the ERM despite assuring the public that he would not do so just a week earlier. He faced fierce criticism at the time for his apparent insouciance in the face of the collapse of the stated central plank of his economic policy. Later that month, at a press conference in the garden of the British embassy in Washington, DC in response to a question as to why he appeared so cheerful, Lamont commented that it was a beautiful morning, adding, "My wife said she heard me singing in the bath this morning," a response which led to the story that he was singing in the bath with happiness at leaving the ERM. After Major left office and published his memoirs, Lamont publicly denied Major's version of events, claiming that Major had effectively opted out of his responsibilities and left Lamont to carry the can for that day's actions. On the evening of Black Wednesday and for days after, Major contemplated resigning, drafting a statement to that effect, but wrote Lamont a note instructing him not to resign.

Major's verdict on the ERM was that it was the medicine that cured Britain of inflation; "it hurt but it worked." Speaking a few days after Black Wednesday, the governor of the Bank of England, Robin Leigh-Pemberton, argued that "the decision to join the ERM two years ago in the circumstances; that, having joined, we were right to endeavour to stick it out; and that, in the circumstances which evolved, we were right to withdraw." Lamont's view expressed in his memoirs was more nuanced: without the discipline of the ERM, the Major government would have given up on the fight against inflation before Black Wednesday; ERM membership delivered a sharp break in Britain's inflation performance; the judgment of the markets that the higher rates needed to maintain Britain's membership was undoubtedly correct; "the ERM was a tool that broke in my hands when it had accomplished all that it could usefully do." Sir Alan Budd, the Treasury's Chief Economic Adviser during the period and later appointed by Gordon Brown to the Monetary Policy Committee, in an economic assessment of Britain's membership of the ERM, has written, "although it was certainly a political disaster, the case can be made that it was an economic triumph and marked the turning point in our macro-economic performance."

During the autumn of 1992, Lamont became a press target in a string of largely fabricated stories: that he had not paid his hotel bill for "champagne and large breakfasts" from the Conservative Party Conference (in fact his bill had been forwarded on for settlement); that he was in arrears on his personal Access credit card bill (true); that in June 1991 he had used taxpayers' money to handle the fall-out from press stories concerning a sex therapist, who was using a flat he owned (the Treasury contributed £4,700 of the £23,000 bill which had been formally approved by the Head of the Civil Service and the Prime Minister; there was never any suggestion that he had ever met her); and that he had called at a newsagent in a seedy area of Paddington late at night to purchase champagne and cheap "Raffles" cigarettes. The last story turned out to have been partly invented (Lamont only purchased three bottles of wine).

=== Post-ERM chancellorship ===
Following Britain's exit from the ERM, Lamont had two major tasks: to replace the ERM with a new framework for monetary policy, and to address the sharp increase in government borrowing caused by the recession and the rapid fall in inflation. In a letter to the chairman of the House of Commons Treasury Select Committee in October 1992, Lamont set out a new basis for the conduct of monetary policy centred on inflation targeting. He set a target range for inflation excluding mortgage interest rate payments of 1–4%, falling into the lower part of the range by the end of the Parliament. In assessing progress toward meeting the inflation target, there was a target for the growth of narrow money (M0) and monitoring ranges for the growth of broad money (M4). Decisions on interest rates would also take account of house and asset price inflation and the exchange rate. Transparency and market credibility would be enhanced by the publication of a monthly monetary assessment and the Bank of England was asked to produce a quarterly inflation report. These innovations marked a decisive break with the past and a necessary step toward central bank independence. Inflation targeting was the basis on which the Bank of England was made independent by the Blair government in 1997, the Bank's Monetary Policy Committee being made accountable for achieving the government's inflation target.

The new framework enabled interest rates to be cut from the 10% that they had been within the ERM to 6% by January 1993. Inflation continued to fall. In June 1993, the first month after Lamont had left the Treasury, Britain recorded its lowest monthly rate of inflation since February 1964. According to Alan Budd, the Treasury's Chief Economic Adviser during the period, the important step of central bank independence could only have been successful once monetary stability had been achieved; "In 1997 the Bank of England was not asked to succeed where politicians had failed; it was asked to maintain the rate of inflation, namely 2.5%, that it inherited." In Budd's view, the essential elements of the new framework and its success in achieving low and stable inflation were the establishment of an inflation target and the institution of monthly meetings with the governor of the Bank of England to discuss interest rates. The new framework, according to Budd, "worked extraordinarily well." "Credit must be given to those, principally Norman Lamont, who designed and implemented it."

Lamont's second task was to reduce government borrowing, which was rising sharply because of the twofold impact of the ERM on the public finances. The loss of output had reduced tax revenues and increased public spending as unemployment rose. The sharp falls in inflation further reduced tax revenues compared to previous forecasts at the same time as increasing public spending after inflation, because public spending is planned in cash terms which becomes worth more in real terms if inflation falls. The March 1993 budget forecast a Public Sector Borrowing Requirement for 1993-94 of £50bn, equivalent to 8% of GDP. In terms of the Public Sector Net Cash Requirement, the definition currently in use to measure the UK government deficit, the actual deficit for 1993–94 of 6.9% was the highest since 1975–76 at 9.2% but just over half the 13.3% deficit projected for 2009–10 in the April 2009 budget.

To reduce government borrowing, the March 1993 budget announced a rising wedge of tax increases – £0.5bn in the first year, £6.7bn in the second, rising to £10.3bn in the third, the aim being to give markets confidence that government borrowing was under control without damaging the recovery. Although the budget provoked a fierce reaction in some parts of the press, its reputation improved with the passage of time. After the 2009 budget, the Sunday Times editorialised that Lamont's budget had been so badly received that he was out of his job within two months, "but it fixed the public finances and set up the prosperity of the 1990s and beyond" and Derek Scott, Tony Blair's economic adviser from 1997 to 2003, wrote that Lamont was "rightly praised" for putting in place the post-ERM framework, that stage of Lamont's career being "due for rerating since, in addition to designing a proper framework for monetary policy (later consolidated by Bank of England independence in 1997), he also took most of the tough decisions on spending and tax to put the public finances on the road to recovery." Sir Alan Walters, whose opposition to the ERM as Mrs Thatcher's economic adviser triggered Nigel Lawson's resignation as chancellor, wrote on the buoyant state of the British economy in 2001 that "all the difficult and correct decisions that produced this happy state of affairs were taken and implemented by Norman Lamont, who thus showed himself, in his Mark 2 post ERM version, to be not only the most effective but also the bravest Chancellor since the War."

Lamont came under criticism in April 1993 for having awarded a special grant of £40 million from HM Treasury to Jacques Attali's European Bank for Reconstruction and Development in order to attract it to the City of London; he sat on the bank's board of governors.

=== Resignation ===
During the Newbury by-election in May 1993, Lamont was asked at a press conference whether he most regretted claiming to see "the green shoots of recovery" or "singing in his bath". He replied by quoting the Édith Piaf song "Non, je ne regrette rien", a dry response which raised a laugh at the press conference but which played poorly when quoted later on the television that evening and afterwards. When called to defend him on Newsnight his friend the former Labour MP Woodrow Wyatt caused further merriment by claiming that Lamont could do an excellent impersonation of a Scops owl (whose cry, Lamont later explained, "sounds like a tennis ball emitter").

Three weeks after the government's massive loss in the by-election, on 27 May 1993, Lamont was sacked (technically resigning from the government because he declined a demotion to become Secretary of State for the Environment), throwing (by his own account) Major's letter of regret at his departure unopened into the wastepaper basket, and giving a resignation speech in the House of Commons on 9 June, that made clear his feeling that he had been unfairly treated, saying that the government "gives the impression of being in office but not in power"; the then Party Chairman Norman Fowler dismissed the speech as "dud, nasty, ludicrous and silly". Major and Lamont agree that Lamont had offered his resignation immediately after Black Wednesday and that Major pressed him to remain in office. Lamont came to the view that Major had sought his survival in office as a firebreak against the criticism of the ERM policy rebounding on himself.

== Post-chancellorship ==
In the following years, Lamont became a fierce critic of the Major government. He is now regarded as a staunch euro-sceptic. In March 1995 he voted with the Labour Party in a vote on Europe, and later that year he authored Sovereign Britain in which he envisaged Britain's withdrawal from the European Union, and was talked of as a potential leadership challenger to John Major; in the event, it was John Redwood who challenged for the leadership. Lamont supported Redwood's campaign, which was managed by David Evans MP. He is the current vice president of the euro-sceptic Bruges Group.

Despite departing under a cloud, Lamont defends his budget record to this day. The 1991 budget, in which he seized the opportunity presented by Thatcher's resignation to restrict mortgage interest tax relief to the basic rate of income tax and also cut the rate of corporation tax by two percentage points, was greeted by positive coverage in The Economist which dubbed him a Nimble Novice. In the 1992 budget, his proposal to advance to a 20% basic rate of income tax through a combination of a narrow initial band, a cut in tax on deposit interest and curtailment of tax allowances was hailed as an elegant way of combining populism with progressivism, though events were later to lend support to Nigel Lawson's view that this approach was strategically inept. His final budget in 1993 was more sympathetically received by financial specialists than John Major's 1990 budget or Kenneth Clarke's budget of November 1993. Lamont attributes the large public sector borrowing requirement (i.e. fiscal deficit) of these years to the depth of the recession triggered by his inability to cut interest rates sooner within the ERM.

The day after his dismissal from the Treasury, Sir Samuel Brittan wrote in the Financial Times that history was likely to record him as one of the better Chancellors, citing his structural reforms of taxation, his determination to give priority to securing and maintaining low inflation and the delayed tax increases in his final budget. "He leaves behind an economy with a faster growth rate than that of any other of the main G7 countries and an underlying rate of inflation lower than in most." According to Ruth Lea, writing 12 years later on the factors behind the subsequent performance of the British economy, Lamont had introduced path-breaking macro-economic reforms including inflation targeting and the first steps towards an independent Bank of England and had begun a programme of fiscal consolidation, which transformed the public finances. "These macro economic reforms, along with the Thatcher economic reforms of the 1980s, effectively transformed the British economy."

=== Brexit ===
In the period after his resignation, Lamont became the first leading politician to raise the prospect of Britain withdrawing from the European Union. Shortly before the 2016 United Kingdom European Union membership referendum, the journalist Matthew d'Ancona wrote that someone must have dared to make the initial leap to retrieve the "frozen thesis" from its glacial prison. "In the case of Brexit, it was Norman Lamont, the former chancellor of the exchequer, who dragged the idea back from the snowy wastes."

At a private meeting of the Conservative Philosophy Group in 1994, Lamont argued that withdrawal from the European Union was an option that should be restored to the range of serious possibilities, d'Ancona, who attended the meeting, wrote. Later that year at the Conservative Party conference in Bournemouth, Lamont addressed a fringe meeting of the Selsdon Group. "When we come to examine the advantages of our membership today of the European Union they are remarkably elusive. As a former Chancellor, I can only say that I cannot pinpoint a single concrete advantage that unambiguously comes to this country because of our membership of the European Union," Lamont told the group. He rejected the argument made by Douglas Hurd, the foreign secretary, who had claimed that the debate in Europe was turning Britain's way. "We deceive the British people and we deceive ourselves if we claim that we are winning the argument in Europe ... There is not a shred of evidence at Maastricht or since then that anyone accepts our view of Europe."

Lamont implicitly challenged the view expressed by John Major, the prime minister of the United Kingdom: "It has recently been said that the option of leaving the Community was 'unthinkable.' I believe that this attitude is rather simplistic." He stopped short of arguing Britain should unilaterally withdraw from the European Union "today," but warned: "the issue may well return to the political agenda." Instead, he outlined an alternative to membership of a federal EU. "This means looking at all the options ranging from membership of an outer tier to participating solely in the European Economic Area. One day it may mean contemplating withdrawal."

=== 1997 election ===
In boundary changes enacted for the 1997 general election, Lamont's constituency of Kingston upon Thames was split up. The northern parts were merged with Richmond and Barnes to form Richmond Park, and the southern parts merged with the larger Surbiton to form Kingston and Surbiton. Lamont lost the contest for the candidacy for the new seat to the incumbent Surbiton MP Richard Tracey. He then embarked on a high-profile search for a new constituency and was eventually adopted as the Conservative candidate for the new seat of Harrogate and Knaresborough in Yorkshire. The move was seen as an attempt to parachute in an outsider, with Lamont seeming like an opportunist next to the Liberal Democrat candidate, Phil Willis, a local teacher and long-time local politician. When the general election came, his unpopularity, and that of the Conservatives in general, led a massive tactical voting campaign in the constituency and the Liberal Democrats won the seat. He was not recommended for a peerage in John Major's resignation honours, but the following year William Hague recommended him, and Lamont was made a life peer as Baron Lamont of Lerwick, of Lerwick in the Shetland Islands, on 24 July 1998.

=== After Parliament ===
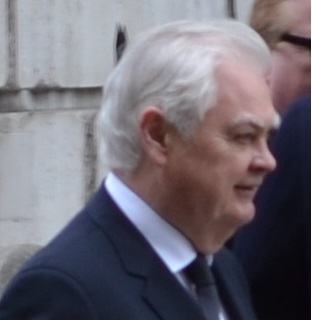
Lamont at Margaret Thatcher's funeral in 2013

In 1998, the former military dictator of Chile, General Augusto Pinochet visited Britain to obtain medical treatment. This prompted a debate about whether he should be arrested and put on trial over his human rights record. Lamont joined with Margaret Thatcher in defending Pinochet, calling him a "good and brave and honourable soldier". His stance was highly criticised.

Lamont attempted to be selected as a candidate for the 1999 European Parliament election, but was unsuccessful.

In February 2005, it was reported in The Times that Lamont and John Major had held up the release of papers concerning Black Wednesday under the Freedom of Information Act. The two wrote to the paper to deny the reports. Later it emerged that the source of the story had been Damian McBride, then a Treasury civil servant who as a result of this became a special adviser to the then chancellor, Gordon Brown. McBride in 2009 resigned from a similar position in 10 Downing Street following publication of emails indicating a plan to smear leading Conservative politicians.

In October 2006, he complained that the new party leader David Cameron (Lamont's political adviser around the time of Black Wednesday) lacked policies. In late 2008, Cameron asked Lamont, together with fellow former chancellors Geoffrey Howe, Nigel Lawson and Kenneth Clarke, to provide him with strategic political and economic advice as Britain's banking and fiscal position worsened.

In June 2007, Lamont became honorary patron of the Oxford University History Society, one of the university's largest societies, and he was, from 1996 to 2008, chairman of Le Cercle, a secret anti-Communist group which meets bi-annually in Washington, DC. In 2008, he became the president of the Economic Research Council, Britain's oldest economics-based think tank.

In February 2015, Lamont resigned as a director of Phorm Corporation Limited, an internet personalisation technology company.

Yanis Varoufakis said Lamont provided him with "counsel", and "advice" and was "a pillar of strength" while he unsuccessfully negotiated Debt relief with the troika during his six months as Greek Finance Minister in 2015.

== Bibliography ==
- Lamont, Norman (1999). In Office. Little Brown. ISBN 0-7515-3058-1. (autobiography)

Parliament of the United Kingdom
Preceded by John Boyd-Carpenter	Member of Parliament for Kingston-upon-Thames; 1972–1997	Constituency abolished
Political offices
Preceded by John Moore	Financial Secretary to the Treasury; 1986–1989	Succeeded by Peter Lilley
Preceded by John Major	Chief Secretary to the Treasury; 1989–1990	Succeeded by David Mellor
Preceded by John Major	Chancellor of the Exchequer; 1990–1993	Succeeded by Kenneth Clarke
Preceded by John Major	Second Lord of the Treasury; 1990–1993	Succeeded by Kenneth Clarke
Orders of precedence in the United Kingdom
Preceded by The Lord Burns	Gentlemen; Baron Lamont of Lerwick	Followed by The Lord Bach
