= Thomas Bowrey =

British merchant sailor and lexicographer

Thomas Bowrey (1659–1713) was an English merchant and mariner involved in the East Indies trade. Initially, an independent mariner in the country trade, he became a Wapping-based merchant and “projector”.

== Biography ==
Bowrey was born on 7 September 1659 in Wapping, England, and lost his father in 1665 during the last major outbreak of plague in London. After the Great Fire of 1666, at the age 7, he departed for the East Indies and arrived at Fort St George, Madras (now Chennai) in 1669.

His experiences during the next decade were recorded in a manuscript passed down the Eliot/Howard family and published as A Geographical Account of Countries Round the Bay of Bengal in 1905. It included the first written account of the recreational use of cannabis in the English language. In 1913, Bowrey's surviving business papers were discovered in a trunk hidden in an attic at Cleeve Prior, Worcestershire. Selections of these papers, edited by Sir Richard Carnac Temple, were published in two works, The Papers of Thomas Bowrey (1927) and New Light on the Mysterious Tragedy of the Worcester (1930).

At the age of 30, Bowrey returned home to Wapping as a passenger on the Bengal Merchant in 1689, married Mary Gardiner in 1691, and acted as a consultant to independent East Indies ventures and published the first Malay-English dictionary in 1701. In 1696, he embarked as commander of the St George Galley on an independent trading voyage that was aborted at Portsmouth. Between 1698 and 1707, Bowrey invested in numerous East Indies ventures, but he never commanded a ship again and suffered many losses. The most notable was the Prosperous taken by pirates in Madagascar and the Worcester seized by the Scots in Edinburgh, an incident that hastened the union of England and Scotland. Subsequently, Bowrey turned his energies to a number of varied projects, including his collaboration with Daniel Defoe in the founding of the infamous South Sea Company.

Having survived 19 years in a region in which most Europeans died within two monsoons, Bowrey died at 53 in 1713. He was buried at Lee, Kent, on 14 March, 1713.

Despite everything, he amassed sufficient fortune for almshouses to be built in his name. He left behind his papers, which shed light on life and commerce during the start of globalisation.

== See also ==
- Richard Carnac Temple
