= George Cave, 1st Viscount Cave =

British lawyer and Conservative politician (1856–1928)

The Right Honourable The Viscount Cave GCMG PC KC
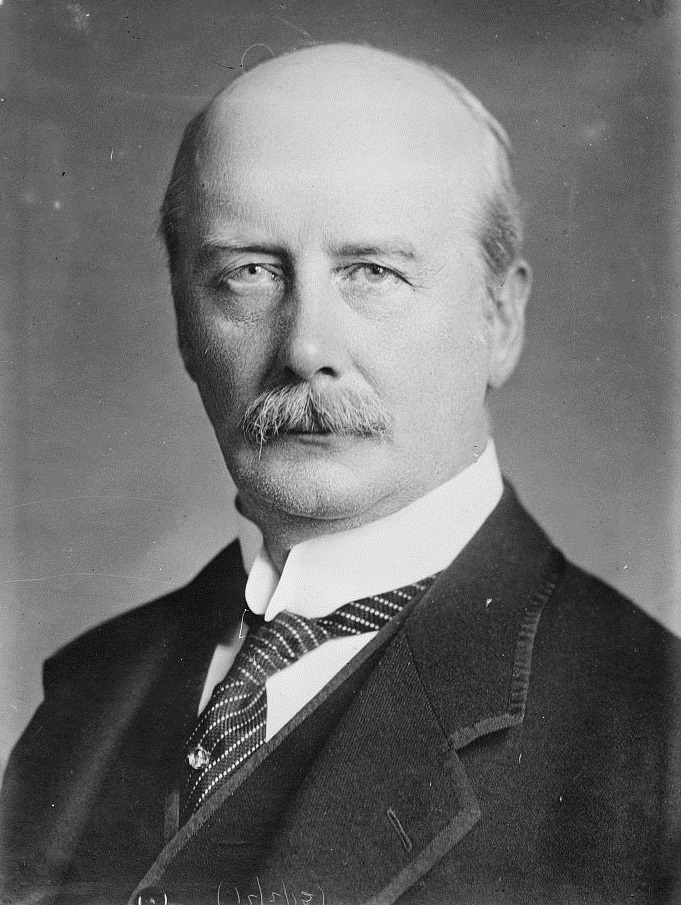
- Cave in 1915

Lord Chancellor
- In office 24 October 1922 – 22 January 1924
- Monarch: George V
- Prime Minister: Bonar Law; Stanley Baldwin
- Preceded by: The Viscount Birkenhead
- Succeeded by: The Viscount Haldane
- In office 6 November 1924 – 28 March 1928
- Monarch: George V
- Prime Minister: Stanley Baldwin
- Preceded by: The Viscount Haldane
- Succeeded by: The Lord Hailsham

Home Secretary
- In office 11 December 1916 – 14 January 1919
- Prime Minister: David Lloyd George
- Preceded by: Herbert Samuel
- Succeeded by: Edward Shortt

Member of Parliament for Kingston-upon-Thames
- In office 8 February 1906 – 14 December 1918
- Preceded by: Thomas Skewes-Cox
- Succeeded by: John Campbell

Personal details
- Born: 23 February 1856 London
- Died: 29 March 1928 (aged 72) St Anne's, Burnham-on-Sea, Somerset
- Party: Conservative
- Spouse: Estella Cave, Countess Cave of Richmond (m. 1885)
- Education: St John's College, Oxford

George Cave, 1st Viscount Cave, GCMG, PC (23 February 1856 – 29 March 1928) was a British lawyer and Conservative politician. He was Home Secretary under David Lloyd George from 1916 to 1919 and served as Lord Chancellor from 1922 to 1924 and again from 1924 to 1928.

== Background and education ==
Cave was born in London, the son of Thomas Cave, Member of Parliament for Barnstaple, and his wife Elizabeth, daughter of Jasper Shallcrass. He was educated at the Merchant Taylors' School, London. He matriculated at St John's College, Oxford in 1874, graduating B.A. in 1878. He was called to the bar in 1880 at the Inner Temple.

Cave practised as a barrister for a number of years, being made King's Counsel and recorder of Guildford in 1904.

== Political career ==
In 1906 Cave was elected Conservative Member of Parliament for the Kingston Division of Surrey, was appointed Vice-Lieutenant of Surrey in 1907, and a member of the Royal Commission on Land Purchase in 1908. Having served as standing counsel to the University of Oxford for two years as well as attorney general to the Prince of Wales, in 1915 Cave was appointed solicitor general and knighted. The following year, he was made Home Secretary in Lloyd George's coalition government, a post he held for three years. As Home Secretary, he introduced the Representation of the People Act 1918 and he was very prominent in the debates in the House of Commons on the police strike of August 1918. In the 1918 discussions that led up to the December 1922 Partition of Ireland, Cave suggested that Ulster loyalists would agree to a state of six of the nine Counties of Ulster. Today, Northern Ireland comprises six Counties of Ulster.

In 1918, Sir George Cave was ennobled as Viscount Cave, of Richmond in the County of Surrey. The following year, he became a Lord of Appeal in Ordinary, and chaired a number of commissions, including the Southern Rhodesian commission and the Munitions Enquiry Tribunal. In 1922, he became Lord Chancellor in Bonar Law's government, and again served in this capacity in Baldwin's first administration. He chaired the post war report that led to cuts to the minimum wages and regulation of collective bargaining, recommended by the Cave Committee in 1922.

Roy Jenkins described Cave as the least distinguished Lord Chancellor in the first three decades of the twentieth century.

== Awards and honours ==
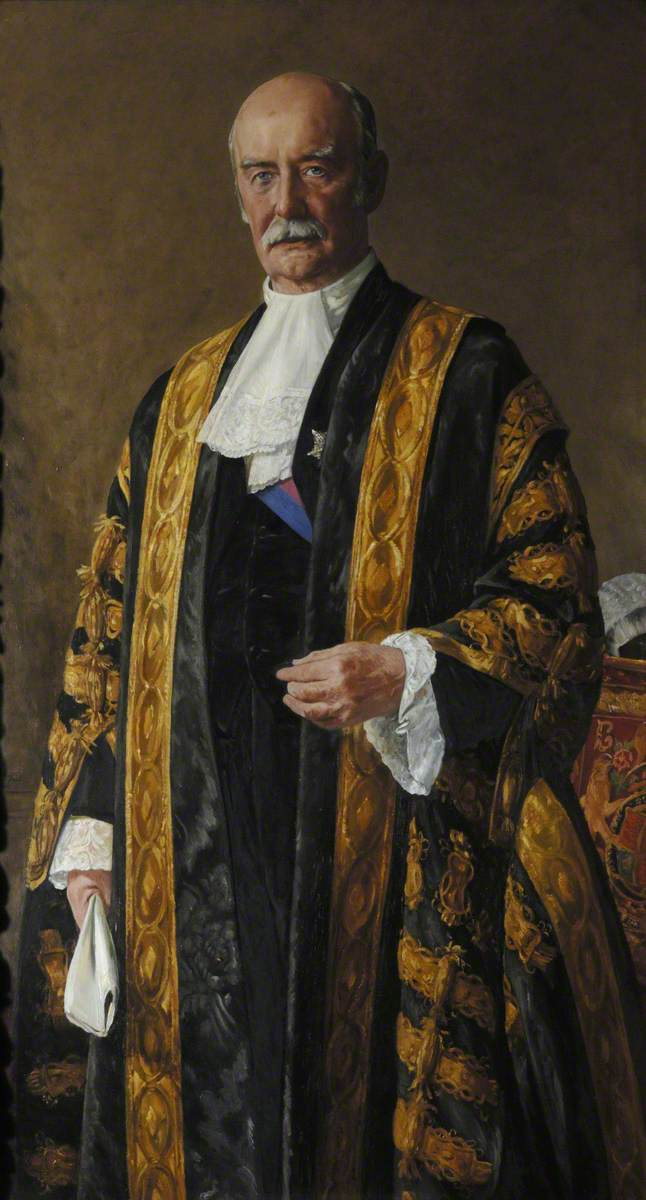
Viscount Cave in the robes of the Chancellor of the University of Oxford

Having been appointed Knight Grand Cross of the Order of St Michael and St George (GCMG) in 1921, he was also elected Chancellor of the University of Oxford in 1925, defeating former Liberal Prime Minister H. H. Asquith. Asquith was upset by the defeat, partly because he felt that Cave, an old friend, should not have stood against him.

== Family ==
Lord Cave married in 1885 Annie Estella Sarah Penfold Mathews, daughter of Captain William Withey Mathews and Jane Wallas (née Penfold), and sister of Sir Lloyd Mathews. They had met by 1880, and he proposed to her in 1883.

The couple had three sons and one daughter. Each of them died on the day they were born, or soon afterwards. They were Ralph Wallas (1885), Lloyd George (1893), Honor Elizabeth (1895), and Mathew George (1899). They are buried at St. Mary's in Richmond. Cave died in March 1928, aged 72, at St Ann's, Burnham, Somerset, and was buried at Berrow in the same county. His wife's brother-in-law, W. K. Laurence, had been buried there only a week or so earlier, after dying after a fall at Clevedon.

On the day of his death, Cave's resignation as Lord Chancellor had been accepted and it had been announced that he would be created an earl. His widow, Estella, was created Countess Cave of Richmond, with remainder to heirs male of her body. With no heir, the viscountcy became extinct on Cave's death, as did the earldom when his widow died in 1938.

Coat of arms of George Cave, 1st Viscount Cave
Crest A greyhound sejant Or pellettée, resting the dexter leg on a cross moline Gules. Escutcheon Or fretty Azure a cross moline within a bordure nebuly Gules on a chief of the last two greyhounds' heads erased of the first. Motto Cave Deus Videt (Beware God Sees)

Parliament of the United Kingdom
Preceded by Sir Thomas Skewes-Cox	Member of Parliament for Kingston; 1906–1918	Succeeded by John Gordon Drummond Campbell
Legal offices
Preceded by Sir F.E. Smith	Solicitor General; 1915–1916	Succeeded by Sir Gordon Hewart
Political offices
Preceded by Herbert Samuel	Home Secretary; 1916–1919	Succeeded by Edward Shortt
Preceded by The Viscount Birkenhead	Lord High Chancellor of Great Britain; 1922–1924	Succeeded by The Viscount Haldane
Preceded by The Viscount Haldane	Lord High Chancellor of Great Britain; 1924–1928	Succeeded by The Lord Hailsham
Academic offices
Preceded by Marquess Curzon of Kedleston	Chancellor of the University of Oxford; 1925–1928	Succeeded by Viscount Grey of Fallodon
