= 1937 Kingston-upon-Thames by-election =

UK Parliamentary by-election

The 1937 Kingston-upon-Thames by-election was held on 1 July 1937. The by-election was held due to the elevation to the peerage of the incumbent Conservative MP, Frederick Penny. It was won by the Conservative candidate Percy Royds.

Kingston-upon-Thames by-election, 1937
Party	Candidate	Votes	%	±%
Conservative	Percy Royds	19,887	66.6	−0.9
Labour	George Henry Loman	9,972	33.4	+12.9
Majority		9,915	33.2	−13.8
Turnout		29,859	38.1	−27.4
Conservative hold		Swing		
