= Peter Penny, 2nd Viscount Marchwood =

British soldier, businessman and hereditary peer

Peter George Penny, 2nd Viscount Marchwood (7 November 1912 – 6 April 1979) was a British soldier, businessman and hereditary peer who was a Conservative member of the House of Lords from 1955 to 1979.

== Early life and education ==
Lord Marchwood was the only son of George Penny, 1st Viscount Marchwood. He was educated at Winchester College.

He succeeded to the viscountcy and other titles upon his father's death on 1 February 1955. He sat in the House of Lords as a Conservative.

== Military service ==
Marchwood was commissioned into the Royal Artillery as a 2nd Lieutenant, rising to the rank of major during the Second World War.

== Business career ==
Marchwood was later a director of George Wimpey and chairman and managing director of Vine Products.

== Marriage and children ==
Marchwood married Pamela Colton-Fox on 30 July 1935. They had three children:

- David George Staveley Penny, 3rd Viscount Marchwood (22 May 1936 - 3 October 2022)
- Hon Patrick Glyn Staveley Penny (3 July 1939 - 10 September 2010)
- Hon Carol Ann Penny (born 30 August 1948)

== Death ==
Lord Marchwood died in 1979, at the age of 66, and was succeeded in the viscountcy and other titles by his elder son, David.
