= George Penny, 1st Viscount Marchwood =

British Conservative Party politician

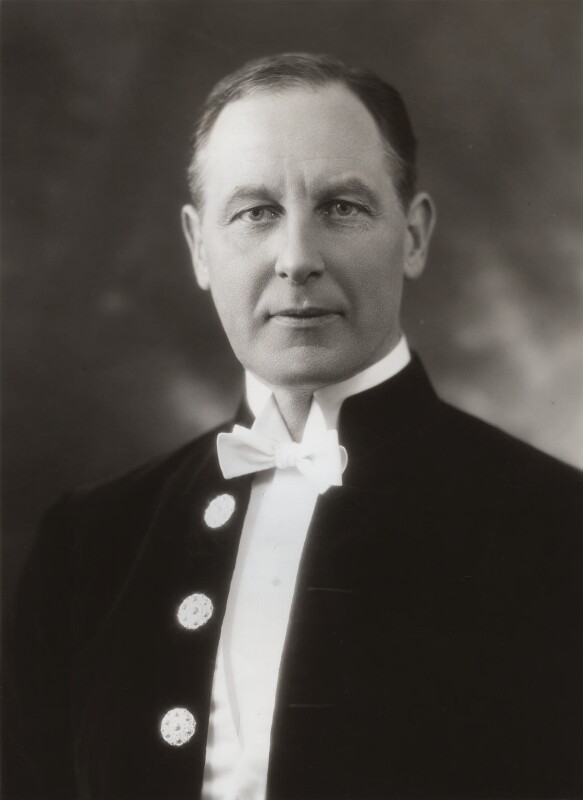
Marchwood

Frederick George Penny, 1st Viscount Marchwood KCVO JP (10 March 1876 – 1 January 1955), was a British Conservative Party politician.

== Early life and education ==
Penny was the second son of Frederick James Penny of Bitterne, Hampshire and his wife Elizabeth Glover, a daughter of George Emerson Glover. He was educated at King Edward VI Grammar School, Southampton.

== Business career ==
Penny was a senior partner in Fraser & Co., Government brokers, of Singapore, and formerly Managing Director of Eastern Smelting Co. Ltd, Penang. He represented the Federated Malay States Government in negotiations with Netherlands Indies Government at Bandoeng, Java, regarding liquidation of war (1914–1918) tin stocks.

== Political career ==
Penny sat as Member of Parliament (MP) for Kingston-upon-Thames from 1922 until 1937. He served as Parliamentary Private Secretary to the Financial Secretary to the War Office in 1923 and as a Conservative Whip from 1926 to 1937, including as a Lord Commissioner of the Treasury from 1928 to 1929. He was Vice-Chamberlain of the Household from 1931 to 1932, Comptroller of the Household from 1932 to 1935 and Treasurer of the Household from 1935 to 1937. From 1938 to 1946 he was Honorary Treasurer of the Conservative Party.

== Honours ==
Penny was appointed a Freeman of the City of London, and an Officer (1st Class) of the Most Honourable Order of the Crown of Johor. He was Master of Honourable Company of Master Mariners from 1941 to 1945. He was knighted in 1929, created a Baronet, of Singapore and of Kingston-upon-Thames in the County of Surrey, in 1933, and raised to the peerage as Baron Marchwood, of Penang and of Marchwood in the County of Southampton, in 1937.

He was appointed a Knight Commander of the Royal Victorian Order in 1937 and made Viscount Marchwood, of Penang and of Marchwood in the County of Southampton, in the 1945 Prime Minister's Resignation Honours.

== Marriage and children ==
Penny married Anne Boyle Gunn, daughter of Sir John Gunn, on 20 July 1905. They had one child:

- Peter George Penny, 2nd Viscount Marchwood (7 November 1912 - 6 April 1979)

== Death ==
Lord Marchwood died on 1 January 1955 at the age of 78.

== Arms ==
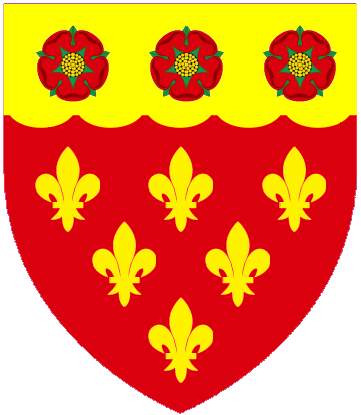
Shield of arms

Coat of arms of George Penny, 1st Viscount Marchwood

Crest
Issuant from a circlet Or a demi-lion Gules collard Sable charged on the shoulder with a rose and holding in the dexter paw a fleur-de-lis Gold.
Escutcheon
Gules six fleurs-de-lis three two and one Or on a chief engrailed of the second three roses of the first barbed and seeded Proper.
Supporters
On the dexter side a Malayan tiger and on the sinister side a sea lion both Proper.
Motto
Semper Paratus

Parliament of the United Kingdom
Preceded by John Gordon Drummond Campbell	Member of Parliament for Kingston-upon-Thames; 1922 – 1937	Succeeded by Sir Percy Royds
Political offices
Preceded by Sir Frederick Thomson, Bt	Vice-Chamberlain of the Household; 1931–1932	Succeeded by Sir Victor Warrender, Bt
Preceded by Walter Rea	Comptroller of the Household; 1932–1935	Succeeded by Sir Victor Warrender, Bt
Preceded by Sir Frederick Thomson, Bt	Treasurer of the Household; 1935–1937	Succeeded by Sir Lambert Ward
Baronetage of the United Kingdom
New creation	Baronet (of Singapore and Kingston-upon-Thames ) 1933–1955	Succeeded by Peter George Penny
Peerage of the United Kingdom
New creation	Viscount Marchwood; 1945–1955	Succeeded by Peter George Penny
New creation	Baron Marchwood; 1937–1955	Succeeded by Peter George Penny
