= Raffles (cigarette) =

British cigarette brand

- An old British pack of Raffles cigarettes
- Product type: Cigarette
- Current owner: Philip Morris USA in the U.S., Philip Morris International outside of the U.S.
- Produced by: Philip Morris USA in the U.S., Philip Morris International outside of the U.S.
- Country: United Kingdom
- Discontinued: May 2011
- Markets: United States, United Kingdom
- Previous owners: Imperial Tobacco
- Tagline: "One Step Ahead"

Raffles (also known as Players in the United States; now Virginia S by Raffles) was a British brand of cigarettes which was owned and manufactured by Philip Morris USA in the U.S. and by Philip Morris International outside of the U.S.

== History ==
In August 2001, Imperial Tobacco announced that it had entered into an agreement with Philip Morris International for the distribution and sale of Marlboro, Raffles and Chesterfield cigarettes in the U.K.

In May 2011, the name of the brand was changed from Raffles to Virginia S by Raffles. Philip Morris Marketing Director Xavier Ducarroz described the rename as a move to a "contemporary look and feel."

== Advertising ==
Various poster and magazine adverts, as well as promotional merchandise, were made to promote the brand in the 1980s and 1990s.

== See also ==
- Tobacco smoking
