= Bruce Kasman =

Economist

Bruce Kasman is a Managing Director and the Chief Economist for J.P. Morgan. He serves as Global Head of Economic Research, where he is responsible for leading a team of thirty economists worldwide that set the firm’s economic and policy views.

Mr. Kasman and his team strive to integrate detailed individual country analysis with a top-down approach that analyzes and forecasts the global economy as a whole. To this end, his team is active in developing tools to measure global activity and in research examining linkages across regions and sectors. He directs J.P. Morgan’s flagship research publication Global Data Watch. J.P.Morgan’s economics team has consistently received high rankings in Institutional Investor’s US and European polls and was selected the “Best Global Forecaster” by Bloomberg in 2012 and 2013. Mr. Kasman joined J.P. Morgan in 1994 and was Head of European Economic Research from 1996 to 1999.

Before joining JPMorgan in 1994, Kasman was a senior international economist at Morgan Stanley. He started his career at the Federal Reserve Bank of New York in the international research department. His responsibility at the Fed included managing a department monitoring US trade and the performance of other large advanced economies.

Kasman holds a PhD in economics from Columbia University.
