= Secretary of State for Defence =

Member of the Cabinet of the United Kingdom

United Kingdom Secretary of State for Defence
- Royal Arms of His Majesty's Government

- Flag of the Secretary of State for Defence

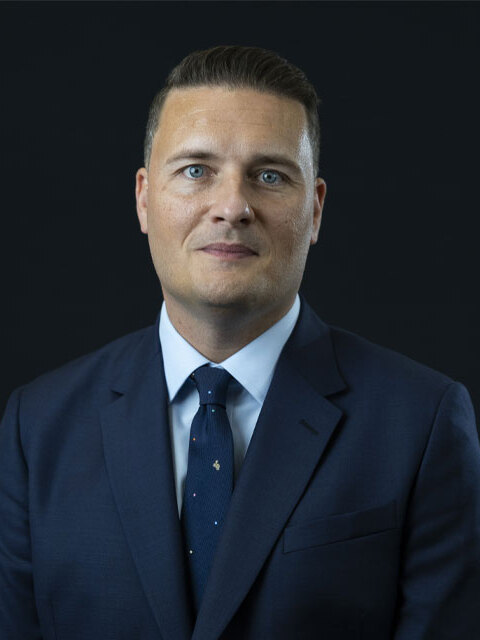
- Incumbent; Wes Streeting since 20 July 2026
- Ministry of Defence
- Style: Defence Secretary (informal); The Right Honourable (within the UK and Commonwealth); His Excellency (diplomatic)
- Type: Minister of the Crown
- Status: Secretary of State
- Member of: Cabinet; Privy Council; National Security Council; Defence Council; Admiralty Board; Army Board; Air Force Board
- Reports to: The Prime Minister
- Seat: Westminster
- Nominator: The Prime Minister
- Appointer: The Monarch; (on the advice of the Prime Minister)
- Term length: At His Majesty's pleasure
- Constituting instrument: Defence (Transfer of Functions) Act 1964 section 1(1)(a)
- Precursor: Minister of Defence; Secretary of State for War; Secretary of State for Air; First Lord of the Admiralty
- Formation: 1 April 1964
- First holder: Peter Thorneycroft
- Deputy: Minister of State for Defence Readiness and Industry
- Salary: £159,038 per annum (2022) (including £86,584 MP salary)
- Website: www.gov.uk/government/ministers/secretary-of-state-for-defence

The secretary of state for defence, also known as the defence secretary, is a secretary of state in the Government of the United Kingdom, with responsibility for the Ministry of Defence. As a senior minister, the incumbent is a member of the Cabinet of the United Kingdom.

The post of secretary of state for defence was created on 1 April 1964, replacing the positions of minister of defence, first lord of the admiralty, secretary of state for war, and secretary of state for air, while the individual offices of the British Armed Forces were abolished and their functions transferred to the Ministry of Defence. In 2019, Penny Mordaunt became the UK's first female defence secretary.

The secretary of state is supported by the other ministers in the defence ministerial team and the MOD permanent secretary. The corresponding shadow minister is the shadow secretary of state for defence, and the secretary of state is also scrutinised by the Defence Select Committee.

The current secretary of state for defence is Wes Streeting. He was appointed on 20 July 2026 following Keir Starmers' resignation.

== Responsibilities ==
In contrast to what is generally known as a defence minister in many other countries, the Defence Secretary's remit includes:

- strategic policy and operational oversight, including as a member of the National Security Council
- nuclear deterrent (CASD) and operations policy and enterprise
- strategic overview of the Strategic Defence Review Implementation and Defence Investment Plan
- Defence budget
- Euro-Atlantic strategy and planning
- Defence strategy, planning, programme, and resource allocation
- maintaining and developing relationships with strategic international partners: US, France, Germany, Australia, Ukraine
- One Defence Reform Programme
- oversight of Veterans programmes
- Service Personnel deaths on duty and letters of condolence
- strategic multilateral programmes – AUKUS and GCAP
- regulatory functions
- Independent Afghan Inquiry

== History ==
Principal political leaders of the English/British Armed Forces:
| | Royal Navy | British Army | Royal Air Force | Co-ordination |
| 1628 | First Lord of the Admiralty (1628–1964) | | | |
| 1794 | First Lord of the Admiralty (1628–1964) | Secretary of State for War (1794–1801) | | |
| 1801 | First Lord of the Admiralty (1628–1964) | Secretary of State for War and the Colonies (1801–1854) | | |
| 1854 | First Lord of the Admiralty (1628–1964) | Secretary of State for War (1854–1964) | | |
| 1919 | First Lord of the Admiralty (1628–1964) | Secretary of State for War (1854–1964) | Secretary of State for Air (1919–1964) | |
| 1936 | First Lord of the Admiralty (1628–1964) | Secretary of State for War (1854–1964) | Secretary of State for Air (1919–1964) | Minister for Co-ordination of Defence (1936–1940) |
| 1940 | First Lord of the Admiralty (1628–1964) | Secretary of State for War (1854–1964) | Secretary of State for Air (1919–1964) | Minister of Defence (1940–1964) |
| 1964 | Secretary of State for Defence (1964–present) | | | |

=== Minister for Co-ordination of Defence (1936–1940) ===
The position of minister for co-ordination of defence was a British Cabinet-level position established in 1936 to oversee and co-ordinate the rearmament of Britain's defences. It was established by the prime minister, Stanley Baldwin, in response to criticism that Britain's armed forces were understrength compared to those of Nazi Germany. When the Second World War broke out, the new prime minister Neville Chamberlain formed a small War Cabinet and it was expected that the minister would serve as a spokesperson for the three service ministers, the secretary of state for war, the first lord of the admiralty and the secretary of state for air; however, political considerations resulted in all three posts being included in the Cabinet, and this role proved increasingly redundant. In April 1940 the position was formally wound up and the functions transferred to other ministers.

| Minister | Term of office | | Party | Ministry |
|---|---|---|---|---|
| Thomas Inskip; MP for Fareham (1876–1947) | 13 March 1936 | 29 January 1939 | Conservative | Baldwin III |
| Thomas Inskip; MP for Fareham (1876–1947) | 13 March 1936 | 29 January 1939 | Conservative | Chamberlain I |
| Ernle Chatfield; 1st Baron Chatfield (1873–1967) | 29 January 1939 | 3 April 1940 | Independent (National) | Chamberlain I |
| Ernle Chatfield; 1st Baron Chatfield (1873–1967) | 29 January 1939 | 3 April 1940 | Independent (National) | Chamberlain War |

=== Minister of Defence (1940–1964) ===
The post of minister of defence was responsible for co-ordination of defence and security from its creation in 1940 until its abolition in 1964. The post was a Cabinet level post and generally ranked above the three service ministers, some of whom, however, continued to also serve in Cabinet.

On his appointment as prime minister in May 1940, Winston Churchill created for himself the new post of minister of defence. The post was created in response to previous criticism that there had been no clear single minister in charge of the prosecution of World War II. In 1946, the post became the only cabinet-level post representing the military, with the three service ministers – the secretary of state for war, the first lord of the admiralty, and the secretary of state for air, now formally subordinated to the minister of defence.

| Portrait | Name (birth–death) | Term of office | | Tenure | Political party | Ministry |
| Portrait | Name (birth–death) | Took office | Left office | Tenure | Political party | Ministry |
|---|---|---|---|---|---|---|
| | Winston Churchill; MP for Epping (1874–1965) | 10 May 1940 | 27 July 1945 | 5 years, 78 days | Conservative | Churchill War |
| | Winston Churchill; MP for Epping (1874–1965) | 10 May 1940 | 27 July 1945 | 5 years, 78 days | Conservative | Churchill Caretaker |
| | Clement Attlee; MP for Limehouse (1883–1967) | 27 July 1945 | 20 December 1946 | 1 year, 146 days | Labour | Attlee I |
| | A. V. Alexander; MP for Sheffield Hillsborough (1885–1965) | 20 December 1946 | 28 February 1950 | 3 years, 70 days | Labour Co-op | Attlee I |
| | Emanuel Shinwell; MP for Easington (1884–1986) | 28 February 1950 | 26 October 1951 | 1 year, 240 days | Labour | Attlee II |
| | Winston Churchill; MP for Woodford (1874–1965) | 28 October 1951 | 1 March 1952 | 127 days | Conservative | Churchill III |
| | Harold Alexander; 1st Earl Alexander of Tunis (1891–1969) | 1 March 1952 | 18 October 1954 | 2 years, 231 days | Independent | Churchill III |
| | Harold Macmillan; MP for Bromley (1894–1986) | 18 October 1954 | 7 April 1955 | 171 days | Conservative | Churchill III |
| | Selwyn Lloyd; MP for The Wirral (1904–1978) | 7 April 1955 | 20 December 1955 | 257 days | Conservative | Eden |
| | Walter Monckton; MP for Bristol West (1891–1965) | 20 December 1955 | 18 October 1956 | 303 days | Conservative | Eden |
| | Antony Head; MP for Carshalton (1906–1983) | 18 October 1956 | 9 January 1957 | 83 days | Conservative | Eden |
| | Duncan Sandys; MP for Streatham (1906–1987) | 13 January 1957 | 14 October 1959 | 2 years, 274 days | Conservative | Macmillan I |
| | Harold Watkinson; MP for Woking (1910–1995) | 14 October 1959 | 13 July 1962 | 2 years, 272 days | Conservative | Macmillan II |
| | Peter Thorneycroft; MP for Monmouth (1909–1994) | 13 July 1962 | 1 April 1964 | 1 year, 263 days | Conservative | Macmillan II |
| | Peter Thorneycroft; MP for Monmouth (1909–1994) | 13 July 1962 | 1 April 1964 | 1 year, 263 days | Conservative | Douglas-Home |

=== Secretary of State for Defence (1964–present) ===
The post was created in 1964 as successor to the posts of minister for coordination of defence and minister of defence. It replaced the positions of first lord of the admiralty, secretary of state for war and secretary of state for air, as the Admiralty, War Office and Air Ministry were merged into the Ministry of Defence (the secretary of state for war had already ceased to be a cabinet position in 1946, with the creation of the cabinet-level minister of defence).

== Secretaries of state for defence (1964–present) ==
Secretary of State for Defence
| Portrait | Name (birth–death) | Term of office | | Tenure | Party | Ministry |
|---|---|---|---|---|---|---|
| | Peter Thorneycroft; MP for Monmouth (1909–1994) | 1 April 1964 | 16 October 1964 | 198 days | Conservative | Douglas-Home |
| | Denis Healey; MP for Leeds East (1917–2015) | 16 October 1964 | 19 June 1970 | 5 years, 246 days | Labour | Wilson (I & II) |
| | Peter Carington; 6th Baron Carrington (1919–2018) | 20 June 1970 | 8 January 1974 | 3 years, 202 days | Conservative | Heath |
| | Ian Gilmour; MP for Central Norfolk (1926–2007) | 8 January 1974 | 4 March 1974 | 55 days | Conservative | Heath |
| | Roy Mason; MP for Barnsley (1924–2015) | 5 March 1974 | 9 September 1976 | 2 years, 188 days | Labour | Wilson (III & IV) |
| | Fred Mulley; MP for Sheffield Park (1918–1995) | 10 September 1976 | 4 May 1979 | 2 years, 236 days | Labour | Callaghan |
| | Francis Pym; MP for Cambridgeshire (1922–2008) | 5 May 1979 | 4 January 1981 | 1 year, 244 days | Conservative | Thatcher I |
| | John Nott; MP for St Ives (1932–2024) | 5 January 1981 | 5 January 1983 | 2 years, 0 days | Conservative | Thatcher I |
| | Michael Heseltine; MP for Henley (born 1933) | 6 January 1983 | 8 January 1986 | 3 years, 2 days | Conservative | Thatcher II |
| | George Younger; MP for Ayr (1931–2003) | 9 January 1986 | 23 July 1989 | 3 years, 195 days | Conservative | Thatcher II |
| | George Younger; MP for Ayr (1931–2003) | 9 January 1986 | 23 July 1989 | 3 years, 195 days | Conservative | Thatcher III |
| | Tom King; MP for Bridgwater (born 1933) | 28 July 1989 | 9 April 1992 | 2 years, 256 days | Conservative | Thatcher III |
| | Tom King; MP for Bridgwater (born 1933) | 28 July 1989 | 9 April 1992 | 2 years, 256 days | Conservative | Major I |
| | Malcolm Rifkind; MP for Edinburgh Pentlands (born 1946) | 10 April 1992 | 4 July 1995 | 3 years, 85 days | Conservative | Major II |
| | Michael Portillo; MP for Enfield Southgate (born 1953) | 5 July 1995 | 2 May 1997 | 1 year, 301 days | Conservative | Major II |
| | George Robertson; MP for Hamilton South (born 1946) | 3 May 1997 | 11 October 1999 | 2 years, 161 days | Labour | Blair I |
| | Geoff Hoon; MP for Ashfield (born 1953) | 11 October 1999 | 6 May 2005 | 5 years, 207 days | Labour | Blair I |
| | Geoff Hoon; MP for Ashfield (born 1953) | 11 October 1999 | 6 May 2005 | 5 years, 207 days | Labour | Blair II |
| | John Reid; MP for Airdrie and Shotts (born 1947) | 6 May 2005 | 5 May 2006 | 364 days | Labour | Blair III |
| | Des Browne; MP for Kilmarnock and Loudoun (born 1952) | 5 May 2006 | 3 October 2008 | 2 years, 151 days | Labour | Blair III |
| | Des Browne; MP for Kilmarnock and Loudoun (born 1952) | 5 May 2006 | 3 October 2008 | 2 years, 151 days | Labour | Brown |
| | John Hutton; MP for Barrow and Furness (born 1955) | 3 October 2008 | 5 June 2009 | 245 days | Labour | Brown |
| | Bob Ainsworth; MP for Coventry North East (born 1952) | 5 June 2009 | 11 May 2010 | 340 days | Labour | Brown |
| | Liam Fox; MP for North Somerset (born 1961) | 12 May 2010 | 14 October 2011 | 1 year, 156 days | Conservative | Cameron–Clegg (Con.–L.D.) |
| | Philip Hammond; MP for Runnymede and Weybridge (born 1955) | 14 October 2011 | 15 July 2014 | 2 years, 274 days | Conservative | Cameron–Clegg (Con.–L.D.) |
| | Michael Fallon; MP for Sevenoaks (born 1952) | 15 July 2014 | 1 November 2017 | 3 years, 109 days | Conservative | Cameron–Clegg (Con.–L.D.) |
| | Michael Fallon; MP for Sevenoaks (born 1952) | 15 July 2014 | 1 November 2017 | 3 years, 109 days | Conservative | Cameron II |
| | Michael Fallon; MP for Sevenoaks (born 1952) | 15 July 2014 | 1 November 2017 | 3 years, 109 days | Conservative | May I |
| | Michael Fallon; MP for Sevenoaks (born 1952) | 15 July 2014 | 1 November 2017 | 3 years, 109 days | Conservative | May II |
| | Gavin Williamson; MP for South Staffordshire (born 1976) | 2 November 2017 | 1 May 2019 | 1 year, 180 days | Conservative | May II |
| | Penny Mordaunt; MP for Portsmouth North (born 1973) | 1 May 2019 | 24 July 2019 | 84 days | Conservative | May II |
| | Ben Wallace; MP for Wyre and Preston North (born 1970) | 24 July 2019 | 31 August 2023 | 4 years, 38 days | Conservative | Johnson I |
| | Ben Wallace; MP for Wyre and Preston North (born 1970) | 24 July 2019 | 31 August 2023 | 4 years, 38 days | Conservative | Johnson II |
| | Ben Wallace; MP for Wyre and Preston North (born 1970) | 24 July 2019 | 31 August 2023 | 4 years, 38 days | Conservative | Truss |
| | Ben Wallace; MP for Wyre and Preston North (born 1970) | 24 July 2019 | 31 August 2023 | 4 years, 38 days | Conservative | Sunak |
| | Grant Shapps; MP for Welwyn Hatfield (born 1968) | 31 August 2023 | 5 July 2024 | 309 days | Conservative | Sunak |
| | John Healey; MP for Rawmarsh and Conisbrough (born 1960) | 5 July 2024 | 11 June 2026 | 1 year, 341 days | Labour | Starmer |
| | Dan Jarvis; MP for Barnsley North (born 1972) | 11 June 2026 | 20 July 2026 | 39 days | Labour | Starmer |
| | Wes Streeting; MP for Ilford North (born 1983) | 20 July 2026 | Incumbent | 125 days | Labour | Burnham |
