= Eden ministry =

1955–1957 government of the United Kingdom

- Cabinet of the United Kingdom
- 1955–1957
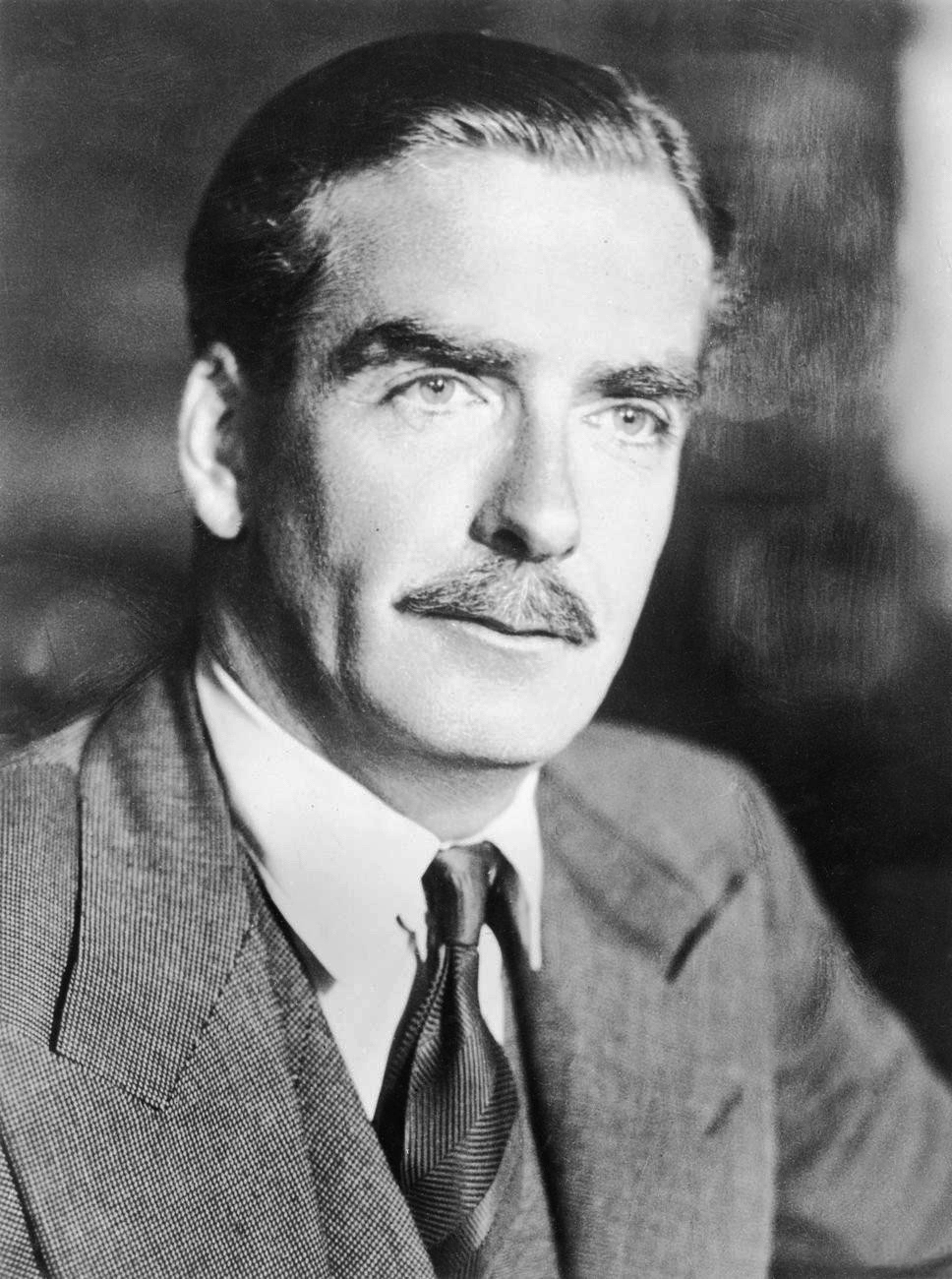
- Date formed: 6 April 1955
- Date dissolved: 9 January 1957

People and organisations
- Monarch: Elizabeth II
- Prime Minister: Sir Anthony Eden
- Deputy Prime Minister: (Note: Rab Butler did not acquire the title of Deputy Prime Minister of the United Kingdom under Eden. He did however serve as Deputy Leader of the Conservative Party.)
- Total no. of members: 132 appointments
- Member party: Conservative Party
- Status in legislature: Majority
- Opposition party: Labour Party
- Opposition leader: Clement Attlee (1955); Hugh Gaitskell (1955–1957)

History
- Election: 1955 general election
- Legislature terms: 40th UK Parliament; 41st UK Parliament
- Predecessor: Third Churchill ministry
- Successor: First Macmillan ministry

In April 1955, following the resignation of Winston Churchill, Anthony Eden, then-Deputy Prime Minister and Foreign Secretary, was invited to form government as he took over as Leader of the Conservative Party.

Eden then shortly asked Queen Elizabeth II to dissolve Parliament and call a general election for 26 May. Winning a majority of 60 seats, he would later resign the office on 10 January 1957.

== History ==
=== Formation ===
In April 1955, Sir Anthony Eden succeeded Sir Winston Churchill as Leader of the Conservative Party and Prime Minister of the United Kingdom, and finally reached the post he had coveted for so long. The original composition of Eden's cabinet was remarkable for the fact that ten out of the original eighteen members were Old Etonians: Eden, Salisbury, Crookshank, Macmillan, Home, Stuart, Thorneycroft, Heathcoat Amory, Sandys and Peake were all educated at Eton College.

He initially retained Rab Butler, with whom he did not get along, as Chancellor of the Exchequer. At the first cabinet reshuffle in December 1955, Eden demoted him to Lord Privy Seal and Leader of the House of Commons. Eden was succeeded as foreign secretary by future prime minister Harold Macmillan, who, however, only held this post until December of the same year, when he replaced Butler as Chancellor of the Exchequer.

Selwyn Lloyd gained his first cabinet post when he succeeded Macmillan as minister of defence in April 1955, and again replaced Macmillan as foreign secretary in December of that year. Another future prime minister, Alec Douglas-Home, entered the cabinet as Secretary of State for Commonwealth Relations in 1955. Gwilym Lloyd George, younger son of former Liberal leader David Lloyd George, remained as home secretary.

=== Fate ===
Eden's decision to take military action over the Suez Crisis of 1956 caused major embarrassment for Britain and their French allies. Eden, then already in declining health, resigned as prime minister and Leader of the Conservative Party in January 1957. Harold Macmillan was chosen over Rab Butler to succeed as party leader and prime minister.

== Cabinet ==
Eden Cabinet
Portfolio	Minister	Term
Cabinet ministers
Prime Minister; First Lord of the Treasury	Sir Anthony Eden	1955–57
Lord High Chancellor of Great Britain	David Maxwell Fyfe, 1st Viscount Kilmuir	1955–57
Leader of the House of Lords; Lord President of the Council	Robert Gascoyne-Cecil, 5th Marquess of Salisbury	1955–57
Leader of the House of Commons; Lord Keeper of the Privy Seal	Harry Crookshank	Apr–Dec 1955
Leader of the House of Commons; Lord Keeper of the Privy Seal	R. A. Butler	Dec 1955–57
Chancellor of the Exchequer; Second Lord of the Treasury	R. A. Butler	Apr–Dec 1955
Chancellor of the Exchequer; Second Lord of the Treasury	Harold Macmillan	Dec 1955–57
Secretary of State for Foreign Affairs	Harold Macmillan	Apr–Dec 1955
Secretary of State for Foreign Affairs	Selwyn Lloyd	Dec 1955–57
Secretary of State for the Home Department	Gwilym Lloyd George	1955–57
Secretary of State for the Colonies	Alan Lennox-Boyd	1955–57
Secretary of State for Commonwealth Relations	Alec Douglas-Home, 14th Earl of Home	1955–57
President of the Board of Trade	Peter Thorneycroft	1955–57
Secretary of State for Air	William Sidney, 6th Baron de L'Isle and Dudley	Apr–Dec 1955
Secretary of State for Air	Nigel Birch	Dec 1955–57
Chancellor of the Duchy of Lancaster	Frederick Marquis, 1st Viscount Woolton	Apr–Dec 1955
Chancellor of the Duchy of Lancaster	George Douglas-Hamilton, 10th Earl of Selkirk	Dec 1955–57
Minister of Education	Sir David Eccles	1955–57
Secretary of State for Scotland	James Stuart	1955–57
Minister of Agriculture	Derick Heathcoat-Amory	1955–57
Minister of Labour and National Service	Sir Walter Turner Monckton	Apr–Dec 1955
Minister of Labour and National Service	Ian Macleod	Dec 1955–57
Minister of Defence	Selwyn Lloyd	Apr–Dec 1955
Minister of Defence	Sir Walter Turner Monckton	Dec 1955–56
Minister of Defence	Antony Henry Head	Oct 1956–57
Minister of Housing and Local Government	Duncan Sandys	1955–57
Minister of Pensions and National Insurance	Osbert Peake	Apr–Dec 1955
Minister of Works	Patrick Buchan-Hepburn	Dec 1955–57
HM Paymaster General	Sir Walter Turner Monckton	Oct 1956–57

=== Changes ===
==== 20 December 1955 reshuffle ====
- Rab Butler succeeded Harry Crookshank as Lord Privy Seal and Leader of the House of Commons.
- Harold Macmillan succeeded Butler as Chancellor of the Exchequer.
- Selwyn Lloyd succeeded Macmillan as Foreign Secretary.
- Sir Walter Monckton succeeded Lloyd as Minister of Defence.
- Iain Macleod succeeded Monckton as Minister of Labour and National Service.
- Lord Selkirk succeeds Lord Woolton as Chancellor of the Duchy of Lancaster.
- Minister of Works, Patrick Buchan-Hepburn, entered the cabinet
- Osbert Peake retired and his successor as Minister of Pensions and National Insurance was not in the cabinet.

==== 19 October 1956 ====
- In October 1956, Sir Walter Monckton became Paymaster General, a post which had been vacant since Lord Selkirk's promotion to Chancellor of the Duchy of Lancaster.
- Antony Henry Head succeeded Monckton as Minister of Defence.

== List of ministers ==
Members of the Cabinet are in bold face.

Office	Name	Dates
Prime Minister and First Lord of the Treasury	**Sir Anthony Eden**	6 April 1955 – 9 January 1957
Lord High Chancellor of Great Britain	**David Maxwell Fyfe, 1st Viscount Kilmuir**	April 1955
Leader of the House of Lords Lord President of the Council	**Robert Gascoyne-Cecil, 5th Marquess of Salisbury**	April 1955
Leader of the House of Commons Lord Keeper of the Privy Seal	**Harry Crookshank**	April 1955
Leader of the House of Commons Lord Keeper of the Privy Seal	**R. A. Butler**	20 December 1955
Chancellor of the Exchequer	**R. A. Butler**	April 1955
Chancellor of the Exchequer	**Harold Macmillan**	20 December 1955
Parliamentary Secretary to the Treasury	Patrick Buchan-Hepburn	April 1955
Parliamentary Secretary to the Treasury	Edward Heath	30 December 1955
Financial Secretary to the Treasury	Henry Brooke	April 1955
Economic Secretary to the Treasury	Sir Edward Boyle	7 April 1955
Economic Secretary to the Treasury	Derek Walker-Smith	11 November 1956
Lords of the Treasury	Edward Heath	April 1955 – 20 December 1955
Lords of the Treasury	Hendrie Oakshott	April 1955 – 13 June 1955
Lords of the Treasury	Martin Redmayne	April 1955 – 9 January 1957
Lords of the Treasury	Richard Thompson	April 1955 – 8 April 1956
Lords of the Treasury	Gerard Wills	April 1955 – 9 January 1957
Lords of the Treasury	Peter Legh	13 June 1955 – 9 January 1957
Lords of the Treasury	Edward Wakefield	24 January 1956 – 9 January 1957
Lords of the Treasury	Harwood Harrison	8 April 1956 – 9 January 1957
Secretary of State for Foreign Affairs	**Harold Macmillan**	7 April 1955
Secretary of State for Foreign Affairs	**Selwyn Lloyd**	20 December 1955
Minister of State for Foreign Affairs	Gerald Isaacs, 2nd Marquess of Reading	April 1955 – 9 January 1957
Minister of State for Foreign Affairs	Anthony Nutting	April 1955 – 3 November 1956
Minister of State for Foreign Affairs	Allan Noble	9 November 1956 – 9 January 1957
Parliamentary Under-Secretary of State for Foreign Affairs	Robin Turton	April 1955 – 20 December 1955
Parliamentary Under-Secretary of State for Foreign Affairs	Douglas Dodds-Parker	20 December 1955 – 9 January 1957
Parliamentary Under-Secretary of State for Foreign Affairs	Lord John Hope	April 1955 – 9 November 1956
Parliamentary Under-Secretary of State for Foreign Affairs	David Ormsby-Gore	9 November 1956 – 9 January 1957
Secretary of State for the Home Department and Welsh Affairs	**Gwilym Lloyd-George**	April 1955
Under-Secretary of State for the Home Department	Sir Hugh Lucas-Tooth	April 1955 – 20 December 1955
Under-Secretary of State for the Home Department	Stormont Mancroft, 2nd Baron Mancroft	April 1955 – 9 January 1957
First Lord of the Admiralty	James Thomas (Note: Viscount Cilcennin.)	April 1955
First Lord of the Admiralty	Quintin Hogg, 2nd Viscount Hailsham	2 September 1956
Parliamentary and Financial Secretary to the Admiralty	Allan Noble	April 1955
Parliamentary and Financial Secretary to the Admiralty	George Ward	20 December 1955
Civil Lord of the Admiralty	Simon Wingfield Digby	April 1955
Minister of Agriculture and Fisheries	**Derick Heathcoat-Amory** (Note: Combined with Minister of Food.)	April 1955
Parliamentary Secretary to the Ministry of Agriculture and Fisheries	Richard Nugent	April 1955 – 9 January 1957
Parliamentary Secretary to the Ministry of Agriculture and Fisheries	Michael Hicks Beach, 2nd Earl St Aldwyn	April 1955 – 9 January 1957
Parliamentary Secretary to the Ministry of Agriculture and Fisheries	Harmar Nicholls	7 April 1955 – 9 January 1957
Parliamentary Secretary to the Ministry of Agriculture and Fisheries	William Deedes	20 December 1955 – 9 January 1957
Secretary of State for Air	**William Sidney, 6th Baron de L'Isle and Dudley**	April 1955
Secretary of State for Air	**Nigel Birch**	20 December 1955
Under-Secretary of State for Air	George Ward	April 1955
Under-Secretary of State for Air	Christopher Soames	20 December 1955
Secretary of State for the Colonies	**Alan Lennox-Boyd**	April 1955
Minister of State for the Colonies	Henry Hopkinson	April 1955
Minister of State for the Colonies	John Hare	20 December 1955
Minister of State for the Colonies	John Maclay	18 October 1956
Under-Secretary of State for the Colonies	Alexander Lloyd, 2nd Baron Lloyd	April 1955
Secretary of State for Commonwealth Relations	**Alec Douglas-Home, 14th Earl of Home**	7 April 1955
Under-Secretary of State for Commonwealth Relations	Douglas Dodds-Parker	April 1955
Under-Secretary of State for Commonwealth Relations	Allan Noble	20 December 1955
Under-Secretary of State for Commonwealth Relations	Lord John Hope	9 November 1956
Minister of Defence	**Selwyn Lloyd**	7 April 1955
Minister of Defence	**Sir Walter Monckton**	20 December 1955
Minister of Defence	**Antony Head**	18 October 1956
Parliamentary Secretary to the Ministry of Defence	Peter Carrington, 6th Baron Carrington	April 1955
Parliamentary Secretary to the Ministry of Defence	Archibald Acheson, 6th Earl of Gosford	26 May 1956
Minister of Education	**Sir David Eccles**	April 1955
Parliamentary Secretary to the Ministry of Education	Dennis Vosper	April 1955
Minister of Food	Derick Heathcoat-Amory (Note: Combined with Minister of Agriculture and Fisheries.)	April 1955
Parliamentary Secretary to the Ministry of Food	Charles Hill	April 1955
Minister of Fuel and Power	Geoffrey Lloyd	April 1955
Minister of Fuel and Power	Aubrey Jones	20 December 1955
Parliamentary Secretary to the Ministry of Fuel and Power	Lancelot Joynson-Hicks	April 1955
Parliamentary Secretary to the Ministry of Fuel and Power	David Lockhart-Mure Renton	20 December 1955
Minister of Health	Iain Macleod	April 1955
Minister of Health	Robin Turton	20 December 1955
Parliamentary Secretary to the Ministry of Health	Patricia Hornsby-Smith	April 1955
Minister of Housing and Local Government	**Duncan Sandys**	April 1955
Parliamentary Secretary to the Ministry of Housing and Local Government	William Deedes	April 1955
Parliamentary Secretary to the Ministry of Housing and Local Government	Enoch Powell	20 December 1955
Minister of Labour and National Service	**Sir Walter Monckton**	April 1955
Minister of Labour and National Service	**Iain Macleod**	20 December 1955
Parliamentary Secretary to the Ministry of Labour	Harold Watkinson	April 1955
Parliamentary Secretary to the Ministry of Labour	Robert Carr	20 December 1955
Chancellor of the Duchy of Lancaster	**Frederick Marquis, 1st Viscount Woolton**	April 1955
Chancellor of the Duchy of Lancaster	**George Douglas-Hamilton, 10th Earl of Selkirk**	20 December 1955
Minister without Portfolio	Geoffrey FitzClarence, 5th Earl of Munster	April 1955 – 8 January 1957
Paymaster General	George Douglas-Hamilton, 10th Earl of Selkirk	April 1955
Paymaster General	Vacant	20 December 1955
Paymaster General	**Sir Walter Monckton**	18 October 1956
Minister of Pensions	**Osbert Peake**	April 1955
Minister of Pensions	John Boyd-Carpenter	20 December 1955
Parliamentary Secretary to the Ministry of Pensions	John Smyth	April 1955 – 20 December 1955
Parliamentary Secretary to the Ministry of Pensions	Ernest Marples	April 1955 – 20 December 1955
Parliamentary Secretary to the Ministry of Pensions	Edith Pitt	20 December 1955 – 9 January 1957
Parliamentary Secretary to the Ministry of Pensions	Richard Wood	20 December 1955 – 9 January 1957
Postmaster-General	Charles Hill	7 April 1955
Assistant Postmaster-General	David Gammans	April 1955
Assistant Postmaster-General	Cuthbert Alport	20 December 1955
Secretary of State for Scotland	**James Stuart**	April 1955
Minister of State for Scotland	Tom Galbraith (Note: Created Baron Strathclyde in 1955.)	7 April 1955
Under-Secretary of State for Scotland	William McNair Snadden	April 1955 – 3 June 1955
Under-Secretary of State for Scotland	James Henderson Stewart	April 1955 – 9 January 1957
Under-Secretary of State for Scotland	Jack Nixon Browne	7 April 1955 – 9 January 1957
Under-Secretary of State for Scotland	Niall Macpherson	13 June 1955 – 9 January 1957
Minister of Supply	Reginald Maudling	7 April 1955
Parliamentary Secretary to the Ministry of Supply	Frederick Erroll	7 April 1955
Parliamentary Secretary to the Ministry of Supply	Ian Harvey	11 November 1956
President of the Board of Trade	Peter Thorneycroft	April 1955
Minister of State for Trade	Derick Heathcoat-Amory	April 1955
Parliamentary Secretary to the Board of Trade	Donald Kaberry	7 April 1955
Parliamentary Secretary to the Board of Trade	Derek Walker-Smith	19 October 1955
Parliamentary Secretary to the Board of Trade	Frederick Erroll	11 November 1956
Minister of Transport	John Boyd-Carpenter	April 1955
Minister of Transport	Harold Watkinson	20 December 1955
Parliamentary Secretary to the Ministry of Transport	John Profumo	April 1955 – 9 January 1957
Parliamentary Secretary to the Ministry of Transport	Hugh Molson	April 1955 – 9 January 1957
Secretary of State for War	Antony Head	April 1955
Secretary of State for War	John Hare	18 October 1956
Under-Secretary of State and Financial Secretary for War	Fitzroy Maclean	April 1955
Minister of Works	Nigel Birch	April 1955
Minister of Works	**Patrick Buchan-Hepburn**	20 December 1955
Parliamentary Secretary to the Ministry of Works	Reginald Bevins	April 1955
Attorney General	Sir Reginald Manningham-Buller	April 1955
Solicitor General	Sir Harry Hylton-Foster	April 1955
Lord Advocate	William Rankine Milligan	April 1955
Solicitor General for Scotland	William Grant	April 1955
Treasurer of the Household	Cedric Drewe (Note: Knighted.)	April 1955
Treasurer of the Household	Tam Galbraith	13 June 1955
Comptroller of the Household	Tam Galbraith	April 1955
Comptroller of the Household	Hendrie Oakshott	13 June 1955
Vice-Chamberlain of the Household	Henry Studholme	April 1955
Vice-Chamberlain of the Household	Richard Thompson	8 April 1956
Captain of the Gentlemen-at-Arms	Hugh Fortescue, 5th Earl Fortescue	April 1955
Captain of the Yeomen of the Guard	William Onslow, 6th Earl of Onslow	April 1955
Lords in Waiting	Bladen Wilmer Hawke, 9th Baron Hawke	April 1955 – 9 January 1957
Lords in Waiting	Thomas Brian McKelvie Fairfax, 13th Lord Fairfax of Cameron	April 1955 – 9 January 1957
Lords in Waiting	John Cavendish, 5th Baron Chesham	April 1955 – 9 January 1957

Notes

Preceded by Third Churchill ministry	Government of the United Kingdom; 1955–1957	Succeeded by First Macmillan ministry
