= Third Churchill ministry =

UK government, 1951–1955

- Cabinet of the United Kingdom
- 1951–1955
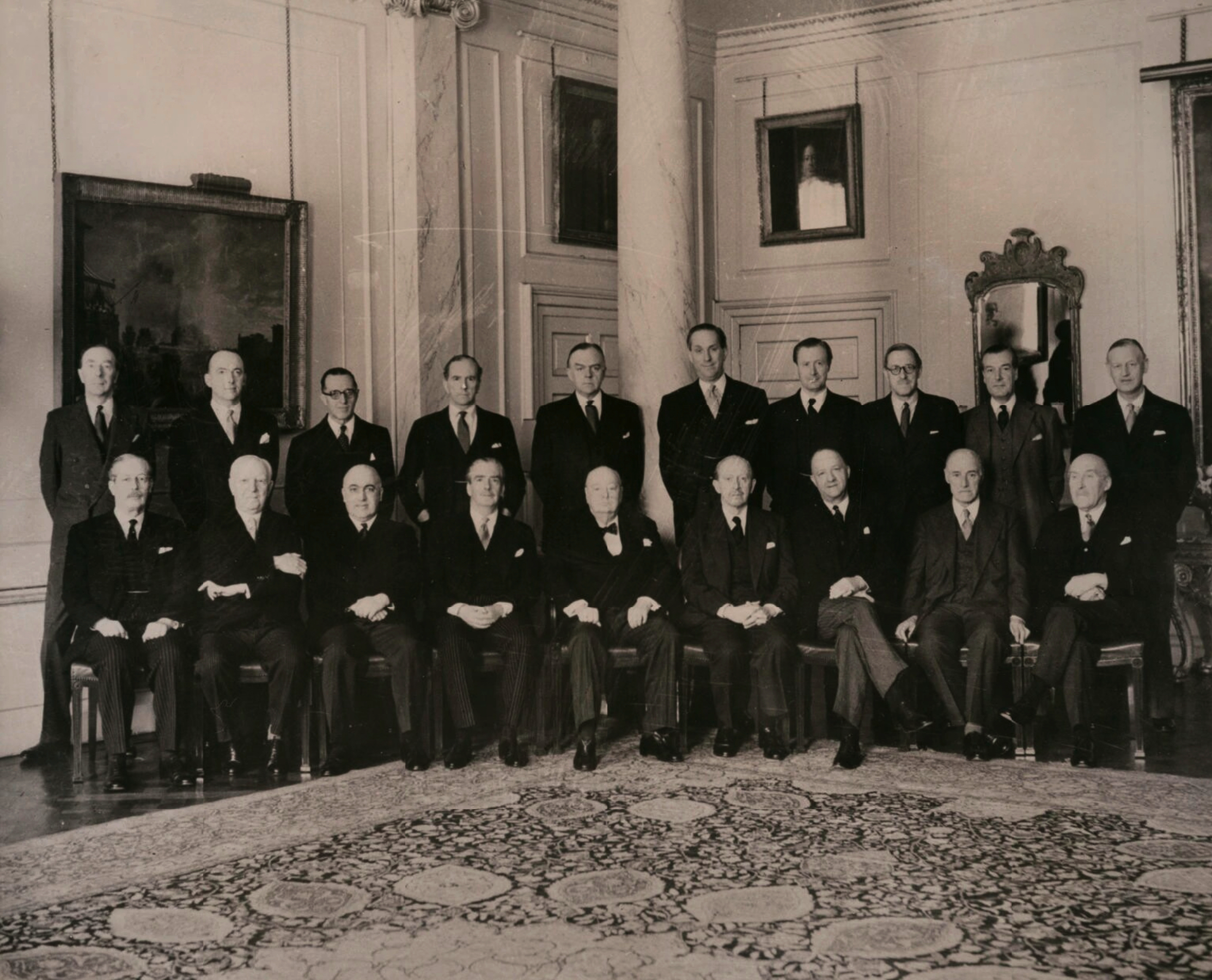
- Prime Minister Winston Churchill's 1955 cabinet.
- Date formed: 26 October 1951
- Date dissolved: 5 April 1955

People and organisations
- Monarch: George VI (1951–1952); Elizabeth II (1952–1955)
- Prime Minister: Sir Winston Churchill
- Deputy Prime Minister: Sir Anthony Eden
- Total no. of members: 149 appointments
- Member party: Conservative Party
- Status in legislature: Majority
- Opposition party: Labour Party
- Opposition leader: Clement Attlee

History
- Election: 1951 general election
- Legislature terms: 40th UK Parliament
- Predecessor: Second Attlee ministry
- Successor: Eden ministry

Winston Churchill formed the third Churchill ministry in the United Kingdom following the 1951 general election. He was reappointed as Prime Minister of the United Kingdom by King George VI and oversaw the accession of Queen Elizabeth II in 1952 and her coronation.

== History ==
The Conservative Party returned to power in the United Kingdom after winning the 1951 general election following six years in opposition. This was the first majority Conservative government formed since Stanley Baldwin's 1924–1929 ministry. Winston Churchill became prime minister for a second time. Churchill's government had several prominent figures and up-and-coming stars. Rab Butler was appointed as Chancellor of the Exchequer while Sir Anthony Eden returned as Foreign Secretary. The noted Scottish lawyer Sir David Maxwell Fyfe, who had gained fame as a prosecutor at the Nuremberg Trials, became Home Secretary. He remained in this post until 1954, when he was ennobled as Viscount Kilmuir and appointed Lord Chancellor. Future Conservative Prime Minister Harold Macmillan achieved his first major Cabinet position when he was made Minister of Defence in 1954.

Gwilym Lloyd George, younger son of former Liberal Party leader and Prime Minister David Lloyd George, replaced Sir David Maxwell Fyfe as Home Secretary in 1954. Florence Horsbrugh became the first woman to hold a Cabinet post in a Conservative government when she was appointed Minister of Education in 1951. Several figures who were later to achieve high offices held their first governmental posts. These included: future Conservative Prime Minister Edward Heath, future Chancellors of the Exchequer Reginald Maudling, Peter Thorneycroft and Iain Macleod and future Foreign Secretary Lord Carrington. Other notable figures in the government were: John Profumo, Bill Deedes, David Ormsby-Gore and Robert Gascoyne-Cecil, 5th Marquess of Salisbury.

The Churchill ministry was mainly concerned with international affairs, the widening Cold War and decolonialisation (especially the Mau Mau Uprising and the Malayan Emergency).

Despite suffering a stroke in 1953, Churchill remained in office until April 1955, when he resigned at the age of eighty. He was succeeded by his ambitious protégé and deputy, Sir Anthony Eden, who finally reached the post he had coveted for so long; although his premiership was to last for less than two years.

== 1955 cabinet ==
- Sir Winston Churchill – Prime Minister
- David Maxwell-Fyfe, 1st Viscount Kilmuir – Lord High Chancellor of Great Britain
- Robert Gascoyne-Cecil, 5th Marquess of Salisbury – Leader of the House of Lords and Lord President of the Council
- Harry Crookshank – Leader of the House of Commons and Lord Keeper of the Privy Seal
- Rab Butler – Chancellor of the Exchequer
- Sir Anthony Eden – Secretary of State for Foreign Affairs
- Gwilym Lloyd George – Secretary of State for the Home Department and Secretary of State for Welsh Affairs
- Derick Heathcoat-Amory – Minister of Agriculture, Fisheries and Food
- Alan Lennox-Boyd – Secretary of State for the Colonies
- Philip Cunliffe-Lister, 1st Viscount Swinton – Secretary of State for Commonwealth Relations
- Harold Macmillan – Minister of Defence
- Sir David Eccles – Minister of Education
- Duncan Sandys – Minister of Housing and Local Government
- Sir Walter Monckton – Minister of Labour and National Service
- Frederick Marquis, 1st Earl of Woolton – Chancellor of the Duchy of Lancaster and Minister of Materials
- Osbert Peake – Minister of Pensions
- James Stuart – Secretary of State for Scotland
- Peter Thorneycroft – President of the Board of Trade
- Norman Brook – Cabinet Secretary

== List of ministers ==
Members of the Cabinet are in bold face.

| Office | Name | Dates | Notes |
|---|---|---|---|
| Prime Minister and First Lord of the Treasury | **Winston Churchill** | 26 October 1951 – 5 April 1955 | Knighted 1953 |
| Lord Chancellor | **Gavin Simonds, 1st Baron Simonds** | 30 October 1951 | |
| Lord Chancellor | **David Maxwell Fyfe, 1st Viscount Kilmuir** | 18 October 1954 | |
| Lord President of the Council | **Frederick Marquis, 1st Baron Woolton** | 28 October 1951 | |
| Lord President of the Council | **Robert Gascoyne-Cecil, 5th Marquess of Salisbury** | 24 November 1952 | also Leader of the House of Lords |
| Lord Privy Seal | **Robert Gascoyne-Cecil, 5th Marquess of Salisbury** | 28 October 1951 | also Leader of the House of Lords |
| Lord Privy Seal | **Harry Crookshank** | 7 May 1952 | also Leader of the House of Commons |
| Chancellor of the Exchequer | **Rab Butler** | 28 October 1951 | |
| Minister of Economic Affairs | Sir Arthur Salter | 31 October 1951 | Office abolished 24 November 1952 |
| Parliamentary Secretary to the Treasury | Patrick Buchan-Hepburn | 30 October 1951 | |
| Financial Secretary to the Treasury | John Boyd-Carpenter | 31 October 1951 | |
| Financial Secretary to the Treasury | Henry Brooke | 28 July 1954 | |
| Economic Secretary to the Treasury | Reginald Maudling | 24 November 1952 | |
| Lords of the Treasury | Harry Mackeson | 7 November 1951 – 28 May 1952 | |
| Lords of the Treasury | Herbert Butcher | 7 November 1951 – 3 July 1953 | Knighted |
| Lords of the Treasury | Edward Heath | 7 November 1951 – April 1955 | |
| Lords of the Treasury | Tam Galbraith | 7 November 1951 – 4 June 1954 | |
| Lords of the Treasury | Dennis Vosper | 7 November 1951 – 4 June 1954 | |
| Lords of the Treasury | Hendrie Oakshott | 28 May 1952 – April 1955 | |
| Lords of the Treasury | Martin Redmayne | 3 July 1953 – April 1955 | |
| Lords of the Treasury | Richard Thompson | 28 July 1954 – April 1955 | |
| Lords of the Treasury | Gerard Wills | 26 October 1954 – April 1955 | |
| Secretary of State for Foreign Affairs | **Anthony Eden** | 28 October 1951 | Knighted 1954 |
| Minister of State for Foreign Affairs | Selwyn Lloyd | 30 October 1951 – 18 October 1954 | |
| Minister of State for Foreign Affairs | Gerald Isaacs, 2nd Marquess of Reading | 11 November 1953 – April 1955 | |
| Minister of State for Foreign Affairs | Anthony Nutting | 18 October 1954 – April 1955 | |
| Parliamentary Under-Secretary of State for Foreign Affairs | Gerald Isaacs, 2nd Marquess of Reading | 31 October 1951 – 11 November 1953 | |
| Parliamentary Under-Secretary of State for Foreign Affairs | Anthony Nutting | 31 October 1951 – 18 October 1954 | |
| Parliamentary Under-Secretary of State for Foreign Affairs | Douglas Dodds-Parker | 11 November 1953 – 18 October 1954 | |
| Parliamentary Under-Secretary of State for Foreign Affairs | Robin Turton | 18 October 1954 – April 1955 | |
| Secretary of State for the Home Department and Welsh Affairs | **Sir David Maxwell Fyfe** | 28 October 1951 | |
| Secretary of State for the Home Department and Welsh Affairs | **Gwilym Lloyd George** | 18 October 1954 | |
| Under-Secretary of State for the Home Department | David Llewellyn | 5 November 1951 – 14 October 1952 | |
| Under-Secretary of State for the Home Department | Sir Hugh Lucas-Tooth | 3 February 1952 – April 1955 | |
| Under-Secretary of State for the Home Department | Alexander Lloyd, 2nd Baron Lloyd | 24 November 1952 – 18 October 1954 | |
| Under-Secretary of State for the Home Department | Stormont Mancroft, 2nd Baron Mancroft | 18 October 1954 – April 1955 | |
| First Lord of the Admiralty | James Thomas | 31 October 1951 | Viscount Cilcennin |
| Parliamentary and Financial Secretary to the Admiralty | Allan Noble | 5 November 1951 | |
| Civil Lord of the Admiralty | Simon Wingfield Digby | 5 November 1951 | |
| Minister of Agriculture and Fisheries | Sir Thomas Dugdale | 31 October 1951 | Post in Cabinet from 3 September 1953 |
| Minister of Agriculture and Fisheries | **Derick Heathcoat-Amory** | 28 July 1954 | Combined with Minister of Food 18 October 1954 |
| Parliamentary Secretary to the Ministry of Agriculture and Fisheries | Peter Carington, 6th Baron Carrington | 5 November 1951 – 18 October 1954 | |
| Parliamentary Secretary to the Ministry of Agriculture and Fisheries | Richard Nugent | 5 November 1951 – April 1955 | |
| Parliamentary Secretary to the Ministry of Agriculture and Fisheries | Michael Hicks Beach, 2nd Earl St Aldwyn | 18 October 1954 – April 1955 | |
| Secretary of State for Air | William Sidney, 6th Baron de L'Isle and Dudley | 31 October 1951 | |
| Under-Secretary of State for Air | Nigel Birch | 3 November 1951 | |
| Under-Secretary of State for Air | George Ward | 29 February 1952 | |
| Secretary of State for the Colonies | **Oliver Lyttelton** | 28 October 1951 | |
| Secretary of State for the Colonies | **Alan Lennox-Boyd** | 28 July 1954 | |
| Minister of State for the Colonies | Alan Lennox-Boyd | 2 November 1951 | |
| Minister of State for the Colonies | Henry Hopkinson | 7 May 1952 | |
| Under-Secretary of State for the Colonies | Geoffrey FitzClarence, 5th Earl of Munster | 5 November 1951 | |
| Under-Secretary of State for the Colonies | Alexander Lloyd, 2nd Baron Lloyd | 18 October 1954 | |
| Secretary of State for Commonwealth Relations | **Hastings Ismay, 1st Baron Ismay** | 28 October 1951 | |
| Secretary of State for Commonwealth Relations | **Robert Gascoyne-Cecil, 5th Marquess of Salisbury** | 12 March 1952 | also Leader of the House of Lords |
| Secretary of State for Commonwealth Relations | **Philip Cunliffe-Lister, 1st Viscount Swinton** | 24 November 1952 | |
| Under-Secretary of State for Commonwealth Relations | John Foster | 3 November 1951 | |
| Under-Secretary of State for Commonwealth Relations | Douglas Dodds-Parker | 18 October 1954 | |
| Minister for Coordination of Transport, Fuel and Power | **Frederick Leathers, 1st Baron Leathers** | 30 October 1951 | Office abolished 3 September 1953 |
| Minister of Defence | **Winston Churchill** | 28 October 1951 | As Prime Minister |
| Minister of Defence | **Harold Alexander, 1st Earl Alexander of Tunis** | 1 March 1952 | |
| Minister of Defence | **Harold Macmillan** | 18 October 1954 | |
| Parliamentary Secretary to the Ministry of Defence | Nigel Birch | 28 February 1952 | |
| Parliamentary Secretary to the Ministry of Defence | Peter Carington, 6th Baron Carrington | 18 October 1954 | |
| Minister of Education | Florence Horsbrugh | 2 November 1951 | Office in Cabinet from 3 September 1953 |
| Minister of Education | **Sir David Eccles** | 18 October 1954 | |
| Parliamentary Secretary to the Ministry of Education | Kenneth Pickthorn | 5 November 1951 | |
| Parliamentary Secretary to the Ministry of Education | Dennis Vosper | 18 October 1954 | |
| Minister of Food | Gwilym Lloyd George | 31 October 1951 | Office in Cabinet from 3 September 1953 |
| Minister of Food | Derick Heathcoat-Amory | 18 October 1954 | Combined with Minister of Agriculture and Fisheries |
| Parliamentary Secretary to the Ministry of Food | Charles Hill | 31 October 1951 | |
| Minister of Fuel and Power | Geoffrey Lloyd | 31 October 1951 | |
| Parliamentary Secretary to the Ministry of Fuel and Power | Lancelot Joynson-Hicks | 5 November 1951 | |
| Minister of Health | **Harry Crookshank** | 30 October 1951 | also Leader of the House of Commons |
| Minister of Health | Iain Macleod | 7 May 1952 | |
| Parliamentary Secretary to the Ministry of Health | Patricia Hornsby-Smith | 3 November 1951 | |
| Minister of Housing and Local Government | **Harold Macmillan** | 30 October 1951 | |
| Minister of Housing and Local Government | **Duncan Sandys** | 18 October 1954 | |
| Parliamentary Secretary to the Ministry of Housing and Local Government | Ernest Marples | 3 November 1951 | |
| Parliamentary Secretary to the Ministry of Housing and Local Government | William Deedes | 18 October 1954 | |
| Minister of Labour and National Service | **Sir Walter Monckton** | 28 October 1951 | |
| Parliamentary Secretary to the Ministry of Labour | Sir Peter Bennett | 31 October 1951 | |
| Parliamentary Secretary to the Ministry of Labour | Harold Watkinson | 28 May 1952 | |
| Chancellor of the Duchy of Lancaster | Philip Cunliffe-Lister, 1st Viscount Swinton | 31 October 1951 | Also Minister of Materials |
| Chancellor of the Duchy of Lancaster | **Frederick Marquis, 1st Baron Woolton** | 24 November 1952 | Office in Cabinet |
| Minister of Materials | Philip Cunliffe-Lister, 1st Viscount Swinton | 31 October 1951 | Also Chancellor of the Duchy of Lancaster |
| Minister of Materials | Sir Arthur Salter | 24 November 1952 | |
| Minister of Materials | **Frederick Marquis, 1st Baron Woolton** | 1 September 1953 | Also Chancellor of the Duchy of Lancaster. Office wound up 16 August 1954 |
| Minister without Portfolio | Geoffrey FitzClarence, 5th Earl of Munster | 18 October 1954 – April 1955 | |
| Minister of National Insurance | Osbert Peake | 31 October 1951 | Combined with Minister of Pensions 3 September 1953 |
| Paymaster General | **Frederick Lindemann, 1st Baron Cherwell** | 30 October 1951 | |
| Paymaster General | George Douglas-Hamilton, 10th Earl of Selkirk | 11 November 1953 | Office not in Cabinet |
| Minister of Pensions | Derick Heathcoat-Amory | 5 November 1951 | Combined with Minister of National Insurance 1 September 1953 |
| Minister of Pensions | Osbert Peake | 3 September 1953 | Office in Cabinet from 18 October 1954 |
| Parliamentary Secretary to the Ministry of Pensions | John Smyth | 5 November 1951 – April 1955 | |
| Parliamentary Secretary to the Ministry of Pensions | Robin Turton | 5 November 1951 – 18 October 1954 | |
| Parliamentary Secretary to the Ministry of Pensions | Ernest Marples | 18 October 1954 – April 1955 | |
| Postmaster-General | Herbrand Sackville, 9th Earl De La Warr | 5 November 1951 | |
| Assistant Postmaster-General | David Gammans | 5 November 1951 | |
| Secretary of State for Scotland | **James Stuart** | 30 October 1951 | |
| Minister of State for Scotland | Alec Douglas-Home, 14th Earl of Home | 2 November 1951 | |
| Under-Secretary of State for Scotland | Tom Galbraith | 2 November 1951 – 5 April 1955 | |
| Under-Secretary of State for Scotland | William McNair Snadden | 2 November 1951 – April 1955 | |
| Under-Secretary of State for Scotland | James Henderson Stewart | 4 February 1952 – April 1955 | |
| Minister of Supply | Duncan Sandys | 31 October 1951 | |
| Minister of Supply | Selwyn Lloyd | 18 October 1954 | |
| Parliamentary Secretary to the Ministry of Supply | Toby Low | 3 November 1951 | |
| Parliamentary Secretary to the Ministry of Supply | Sir Edward Boyle | 28 July 1954 | |
| President of the Board of Trade | Peter Thorneycroft | 30 October 1951 | Office in Cabinet by 1955 |
| Minister of State for Trade | Derick Heathcoat-Amory | 3 September 1953 | |
| Minister of State for Trade | Derek Walker-Smith | 18 October 1954 | |
| Parliamentary Secretary to the Board of Trade | Henry Strauss | 3 November 1951 | |
| Secretary for Overseas Trade | Henry Hopkinson | 3 November 1951 | |
| Secretary for Overseas Trade | Harry Mackeson | 28 May 1952 | Office replaced by Minister of State for Trade 3 September 1953 |
| Minister of Transport | John Maclay | 31 October 1951 | |
| Minister of Transport | Alan Lennox-Boyd | 7 May 1952 | Ministries of Transport and Civil Aviation merged 1 October 1953 |
| Minister of Transport | John Boyd-Carpenter | 28 July 1954 | |
| Parliamentary Secretary to the Ministry of Transport | Joseph Gurney Braithwaite | 5 November 1951 – 1 November 1953 | |
| Parliamentary Secretary to the Ministry of Transport | Reginald Maudling | 18 April 1952 – 24 November 1952 | |
| Parliamentary Secretary to the Ministry of Transport | John Profumo | 24 November 1952 – April 1955 | |
| Parliamentary Secretary to the Ministry of Transport | Hugh Molson | 11 November 1953 – April 1955 | |
| Secretary of State for War | Antony Head | 31 October 1951 | |
| Under-Secretary of State and Financial Secretary for War | James Hutchison | 5 November 1951 | |
| Under-Secretary of State and Financial Secretary for War | Fitzroy Maclean | 18 October 1954 | |
| Minister of Works | Sir David Eccles | 1 November 1951 | |
| Minister of Works | Nigel Birch | 18 October 1954 | |
| Parliamentary Secretary to the Ministry of Works | Hugh Molson | 3 November 1951 | |
| Parliamentary Secretary to the Ministry of Works | Reginald Bevins | 11 November 1953 | |
| Attorney General | Sir Lionel Heald | 3 November 1951 | |
| Attorney General | Sir Reginald Manningham-Buller | 18 October 1954 | |
| Solicitor General | Sir Reginald Manningham-Buller | 3 November 1951 | |
| Solicitor General | Sir Harry Hylton-Foster | 18 October 1954 | |
| Lord Advocate | James Clyde | 2 November 1951 | |
| Lord Advocate | William Rankine Milligan | 30 December 1954 | |
| Solicitor General for Scotland | William Rankine Milligan | 2 November 1951 | Not an MP |
| Solicitor General for Scotland | William Grant | 10 January 1955 | |
| Treasurer of the Household | Cedric Drewe | 7 November 1951 | Knighted |
| Comptroller of the Household | Roger Conant | 7 November 1951 | |
| Comptroller of the Household | Tam Galbraith | 7 June 1954 | |
| Vice-Chamberlain of the Household | Henry Studholme | 7 November 1951 | |
| Captain of the Gentlemen-at-Arms | Hugh Fortescue, 5th Earl Fortescue | 5 November 1951 | |
| Captain of the Yeomen of the Guard | William Onslow, 6th Earl of Onslow | 5 November 1951 | |
| Lords in Waiting | Frederick Smith, 2nd Earl of Birkenhead | 5 November 1951 – 28 January 1955 | |
| Lords in Waiting | George Douglas-Hamilton, 10th Earl of Selkirk | 5 November 1951 – 11 November 1953 | |
| Lords in Waiting | Alexander Lloyd, 2nd Baron Lloyd | 7 November 1951 – 24 November 1952 | |
| Lords in Waiting | Stormont Mancroft, 2nd Baron Mancroft | 15 December 1952 – 18 October 1954 | |
| Lords in Waiting | Bladen Hawke, 9th Baron Hawke | 11 November 1953 – April 1955 | |
| Lords in Waiting | Thomas Fairfax, 13th Lord Fairfax of Cameron | 18 October 1954 – April 1955 | |
| Lords in Waiting | John Cavendish, 5th Baron Chesham | 28 January 1955 – April 1955 | |

| Preceded by Second Attlee ministry | Government of the United Kingdom; 1951–1955 | Succeeded by Eden ministry |
