= National Government (1931) =

1st National Government of the United Kingdom

- 1st National Government of the United Kingdom
- August–October 1931
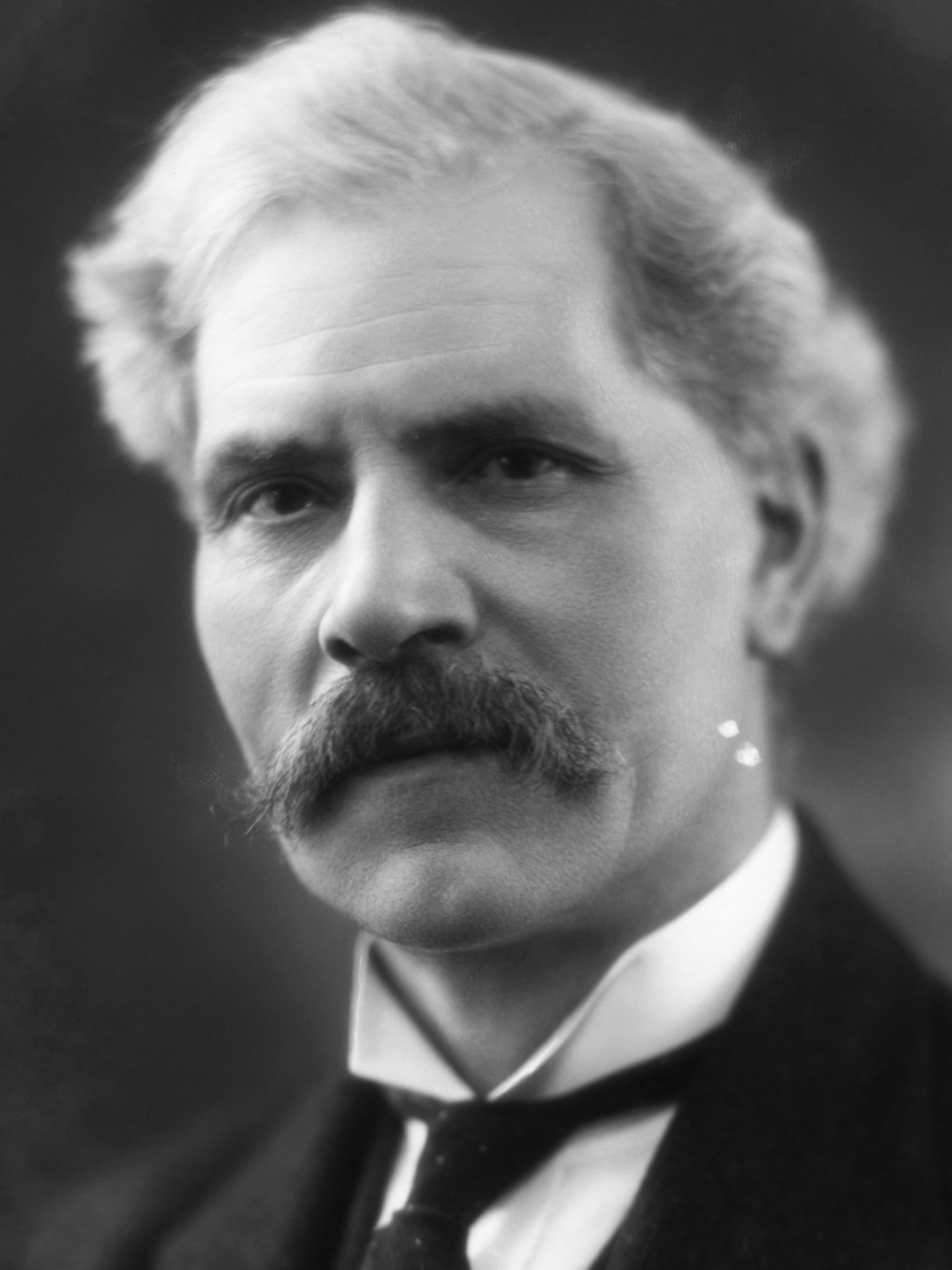
- Ramsay MacDonald
- Date formed: 24 August 1931
- Date dissolved: 27 October 1931

People and organisations
- Monarch: George V
- Prime Minister: Ramsay MacDonald
- Prime Minister's history: 1929–1935
- Deputy Prime Minister: Stanley Baldwin (Note: According to Eccleshall & Walker (2002:273) and Stanton (2000:26), Baldwin was the effective deputy prime minister in the Conservative-dominated Cabinet. He served as Lord President of the Council.)
- Total no. of members: 59 appointments
- Member parties: Conservative Party; Liberal Party; National Labour; Liberal National Party
- Status in legislature: Majority (coalition)
- Opposition party: Labour Party
- Opposition leaders: Arthur Henderson in the House of Commons; Lord Parmoor in the House of Lords

History
- Outgoing election: 1931 general election
- Legislature terms: 35th UK Parliament
- Predecessor: Second MacDonald ministry
- Successor: Second National Government

The National Government of August–October 1931, also known as the First National Government, was the first of a series of national governments formed during the Great Depression in the United Kingdom. It was formed by Ramsay MacDonald as Prime Minister of the United Kingdom following the collapse of the previous minority government, led by the Labour Party, known as the Second MacDonald ministry.

As a National Government, it was dominated by members of the Conservative Party, and also included a few from Liberals and National Labour, as well as individuals who belonged to no political party. The breakaway Liberal Nationals supported the National Government after their formation in September 1931 but none received posts in the new administration. Subsequently, two Liberal ministers, Alec Glassey and John Pybus, defected to the Liberal Nationals. It did not contain members of the Labour Party as MacDonald had been expelled from it. The Labour Party led the opposition.

Denounced as a traitor, MacDonald was expelled from the Labour Party, and remained a hated figure within the Labour Party, despite his great services to his party earlier in his life.

== Formation ==
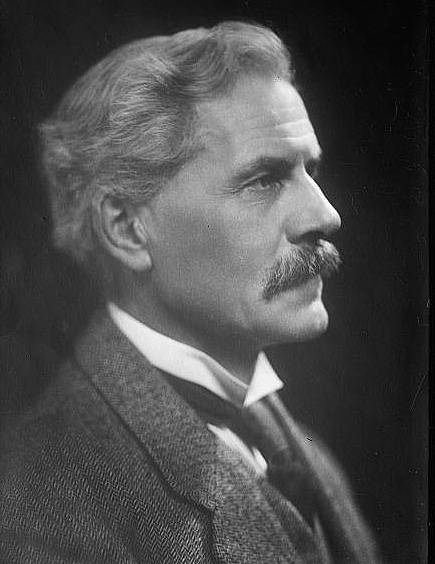
Ramsay MacDonald had served as Prime Minister since 1929.

The outgoing Labour cabinet, which was a minority government, was unable to agree upon proposals to cut public expenditure. Prime Minister MacDonald submitted his resignation to King George V on 24 August 1931.

The new ministry was formed on the same day, when MacDonald was re-appointed prime minister. A smaller-than-usual cabinet was appointed on 25 August 1931. The King persuaded MacDonald that it was his duty to form a new government to address the financial crisis. The original idea was that the National Government would be free to draw upon the talents of members of all parties, so that it would represent the nation as a whole rather than being a coalition of parties like those which had existed between 1915 and 1922. However, as the main body of the Labour Party refused to co-operate, the government comprised members from MacDonald's small group of National Labour supporters, the Conservative Party and the Liberal Party.

The Liberal Party was split into three factions. The mainstream party led by Sir Herbert Samuel, who had been the Deputy Leader of the party before the formation of the National Government, continued to support free trade. The Liberal National group led by Sir John Simon had accepted the Conservative policy of protectionism. These two Liberal factions were supporters of the National Ministry. The third group led by David Lloyd George (later to be called the Independent Liberals) had initially supported the creation of the National Government with two of them (Gwilym Lloyd George and Goronwy Owen) taking office. David Lloyd George had been expected to join the government after recovering from surgery following an operation on his prostate as he was still the official leader of the Liberal party. However, he refused to support the calling of a general election, and persuaded his supporters to leave the government and go into opposition.

== General election ==
MacDonald's National Government had not originally been intended to fight a general election, but under Conservative pressure one was soon called. The Samuelite Liberal Party was opposed to a general election but found it could not prevent one. Parliament was dissolved on 8 October 1931.

The 1931 general election took place on 27 October 1931 and led to a landslide victory for candidates supporting the National Government. MacDonald reconstructed his government on 5 November 1931, establishing the 1931–35 National Government.

== Cabinet ==
The main roles:

=== August 1931 – November 1931 ===
- Ramsay MacDonald – Prime Minister and Leader of the House of Commons
- Lord Sankey – Lord Chancellor
- Stanley Baldwin – Lord President
- Philip Snowden – Chancellor of the Exchequer
- Sir Herbert Samuel – Home Secretary
- Rufus Isaacs, 1st Marquess of Reading – Foreign Secretary and Leader of the House of Lords
- Sir Samuel Hoare – Secretary for India
- J.H. Thomas – Dominions Secretary and Colonial Secretary
- Sir Philip Cunliffe-Lister – President of the Board of Trade
- Neville Chamberlain – Minister of Health

==== Key ====
- = Member of National Labour
- = Member of the Conservative Party
- = Member of the Liberal Party

== Members of the Ministry ==
The First National Government was composed of members of the following parties:

- National Labour
- Conservative Party
- Liberal Party

Members of the Cabinet are in bold face.

Office	Name	Party	Dates
Prime Minister	**Ramsay MacDonald**	National Labour	24 August 1931 – 5 November 1931
Lord Chancellor	**John Sankey, 1st Baron Sankey**	National Labour	25 August 1931
Lord President of the Council	**Stanley Baldwin**	Conservative	25 August 1931
Lord Privy Seal	William Peel, 1st Earl Peel	Conservative	3 September 1931
Chancellor of the Exchequer	**Philip Snowden**	National Labour	25 August 1931
Parliamentary Secretary to the Treasury	Sir Bolton Eyres-Monsell	Conservative	3 September 1931
Financial Secretary to the Treasury	Walter Elliot	Conservative	3 September 1931
Lords of the Treasury	David Margesson	Conservative	26 August 1931 – 10 November 1931
Lords of the Treasury	Sir Frederick Penny	Conservative	3 September 1931 – 12 November 1931
Lords of the Treasury	Alec Glassey	Liberal (Note: Glassey later joined the Liberal National Party.)	14 September 1931 – 12 November 1931
Lords of the Treasury	William Cavendish-Bentinck, Marquess of Titchfield	Conservative	3 September 1931 – 12 November 1931
Lords of the Treasury	Euan Wallace	Conservative	3 September 1931 – 12 November 1931
Secretary of State for Foreign Affairs	**Rufus Isaacs, 1st Marquess of Reading**	Liberal	25 August 1931
Parliamentary Under-Secretary of State for Foreign Affairs	Anthony Eden	Conservative	3 September 1931
Secretary of State for the Home Department	**Sir Herbert Samuel**	Liberal	25 August 1931
Under-Secretary of State for the Home Department	Oliver Stanley	Conservative	3 September 1931
First Lord of the Admiralty	Sir Austen Chamberlain	Conservative	25 August 1931
Parliamentary and Financial Secretary to the Admiralty	James Stanhope, 7th Earl Stanhope	Conservative	3 September 1931
Minister of Agriculture and Fisheries	Sir John Gilmour, 2nd Baronet	Conservative	25 August 1931
Parliamentary Secretary to the Ministry of Agriculture and Fisheries	vacant		
Secretary of State for Air	William Mackenzie, 1st Baron Amulree	National Labour	25 August 1931
Under-Secretary of State for Air	Sir Philip Sassoon	Conservative	3 September 1931
Secretary of State for the Colonies	**James Henry Thomas**	National Labour	25 August 1931
Under-Secretary of State for the Colonies	Sir Robert Hamilton	Liberal	3 September 1931
Secretary of State for Dominion Affairs	**James Henry Thomas**	National Labour	25 August 1931
Under-Secretary of State for Dominion Affairs	Malcolm MacDonald	National Labour	3 September 1931
President of the Board of Education	Sir Donald Maclean	Liberal	25 August 1931
Parliamentary Secretary to the Board of Education	Sir Kingsley Wood	Conservative	3 September 1931
Minister of Health	**Neville Chamberlain**	Conservative	25 August 1931
Parliamentary Secretary to the Ministry of Health	Ernest Simon	Liberal	22 September 1931
Secretary of State for India	**Sir Samuel Hoare**	Conservative	25 August 1931
Under-Secretary of State for India	vacant		
Minister of Labour	Sir Henry Betterton	Conservative	25 August 1931
Parliamentary Secretary to the Ministry of Labour	Milner Gray	Liberal	3 September 1931
Chancellor of the Duchy of Lancaster	Philip Kerr, 11th Marquess of Lothian	Liberal	25 August 1931
Paymaster General	Sir Tudor Walters	Liberal	4 September 1931
Minister for Pensions	George Tryon	Conservative	3 September 1931
Parliamentary Secretary to the Ministry of Pensions	vacant		
Postmaster-General	William Ormsby-Gore	Conservative	3 September 1931
Assistant Postmaster-General	Graham White	Liberal	3 September 1931
Secretary of State for Scotland	Sir Archibald Sinclair	Liberal	25 August 1931
Under-Secretary of State for Scotland	Noel Skelton	Conservative	3 September 1931
President of the Board of Trade	Sir Philip Cunliffe-Lister	Conservative	25 August 1931
Parliamentary Secretary to the Board of Trade	Gwilym Lloyd George	Liberal	3 September 1931
Secretary for Overseas Trade	Sir Edward Young	Conservative	3 September 1931
Secretary for Mines	Isaac Foot	Liberal	3 September 1931
Minister of Transport	John Pybus	Liberal (Note: Pybus later joined the Liberal National Party.)	3 September 1931
Parliamentary Secretary to the Ministry of Transport	George Gillett	National Labour	4 September 1931
Secretary of State for War	Robert Crewe-Milnes, 1st Marquess of Crewe	Liberal	26 August 1931
Under-Secretary of State for War	vacant		
Financial Secretary to the War Office	Alfred Duff Cooper	Conservative	3 September 1931
First Commissioner of Works	Charles Vane-Tempest-Stewart, 7th Marquess of Londonderry	Conservative	25 August 1931
Attorney General	Sir William Jowitt	National Labour	3 September 1931
Solicitor General	Sir Thomas Inskip	Conservative	3 September 1931
Lord Advocate	Craigie Mason Aitchison	National Labour	3 September 1931
Solicitor General for Scotland	John Charles Watson	National Labour	4 September 1931
Treasurer of the Household	Sir George Hennessy, 1st Baronet	Conservative	3 September 1931
Comptroller of the Household	Goronwy Owen	Liberal	14 September 1931
Vice-Chamberlain of the Household	Sir Frederick Charles Thomson	Conservative	3 September 1931

== Footnotes ==
Preceded by Second MacDonald ministry	Government of the United Kingdom; 1931–1935	Succeeded by Second National Government
