= Jonathan Lord =

British politician

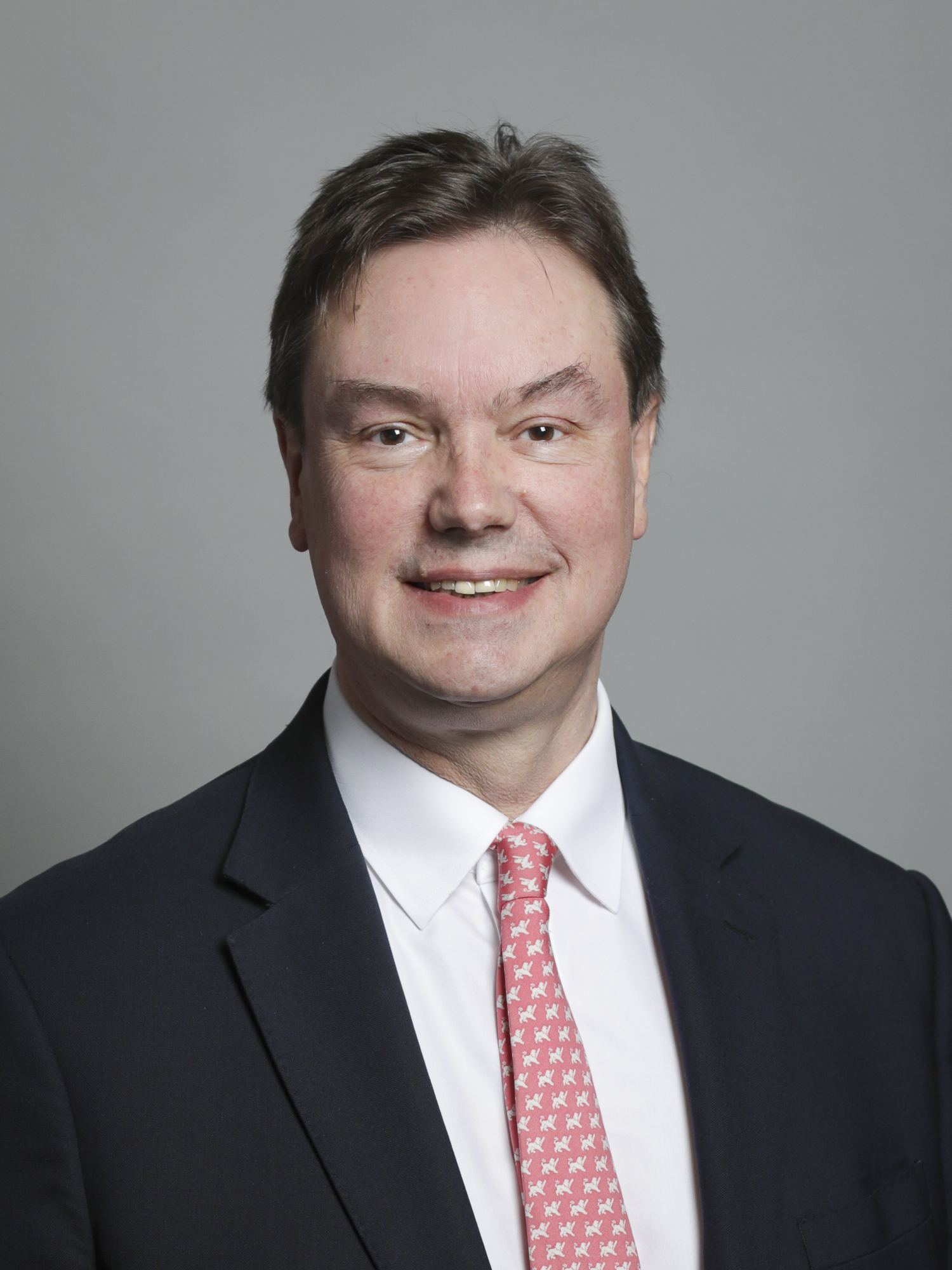
- Official portrait, 2020

Member of Parliament for Woking
- In office 6 May 2010 – 30 May 2024
- Preceded by: Humfrey Malins
- Succeeded by: Will Forster

Member of Surrey County Council for Cranleigh and Ewhurst
- In office June 2009 – May 2011
- Preceded by: Cyril Baily
- Succeeded by: Alan Young

Member of Westminster City Council for Little Venice
- In office May 1994 – May 2002

Personal details
- Born: 17 September 1962 (age 63) Oldham, Lancashire, England
- Party: Conservative
- Spouse: Caroline Commander (m. 2002)
- Children: John Lord; Katherine Lord
- Education: Merton College, Oxford
- Profession: Marketing, politician
- Website: www.jonathanlord.co.uk

Jonathan George Caladine Lord (born 17 September 1962) is a British Conservative Party politician who served as the Member of Parliament (MP) for Woking from 2010 to 2024.

== Early life ==
Jonathan Lord was born in 1962 to John Herent Lord, a circuit judge, and June Ann Lord (née Caladine). He was educated at Shrewsbury School, which included a year scholarship to Kent School in Connecticut. Lord then graduated in 1985 with a BA in History from Merton College, Oxford, and was president of the Oxford University Conservative Association in Michaelmas Term 1983.

== Political career ==
Lord served on Westminster City Council between 1994 and 2002, as a member of the Conservative Party, and was deputy leader between 1998 and 2000.

At the 1997 general election, he stood in Oldham West and Royton, coming second with 23.4% of the vote behind the incumbent Labour MP Michael Meacher.

For the 2005 general election, he managed the election campaign for Anne Milton MP, subsequently becoming chair of her local Conservative Association and serving on Surrey County Council between 2009 and 2011.

== Parliamentary career ==
At the 2010 general election, Lord was elected to Parliament as MP for Woking with 50.3% of the vote and a majority of 6,807. He was re-elected as MP for Woking at the 2015 general election with an increased vote share of 56.2% and an increased majority of 20,810. Lord was again re-elected at the snap 2017 general election, with a decreased vote share of 54.1% and a decreased majority of 16,724. He was again re-elected at the 2019 general election with a decreased vote share of 48.9% and a decreased majority of 9,767. In the 2024 General Election Lord lost the Woking seat to Will Forster of the Liberal Democrats; Lord's share of the vote dropped from 48.3% of the vote to 26.5%, while Forster's share of the vote at 49.9% was 18.8% higher than that of the Liberal Democrat candidate at the previous election. The seat had previously been a safe Conservative seat since its formation in 1950; the personal swing against Lord was 21.8%, noticeably higher than the national swing against the Conservative Party as a whole.

=== All Parliamentary Groups (APPGs) ===
At the time of the 2024 dissolution of Parliament, Lord served on seven All Parliamentary Groups, including the Ahmadiyya Muslim Community APPG, Children who need Palliative Care (Vice Chair), Egypt (chair), Isle of Man (Manx), South East, South Western Railway (Co-chair), Yoga in Society (chair). He had previously served on Immigration Law and Policy, Longevity, Sixth Form Education and Waterways.

== Personal life ==
He married Caroline Commander in 2000, with whom he has two children: John and Katherine.

Parliament of the United Kingdom
Preceded by Humfrey Malins	Member of Parliament for Woking; 2010–2024	Succeeded by Will Forster
