= Minister of Agriculture, Fisheries and Food =

Defunct United Kingdom cabinet position

United Kingdom Minister of Agriculture, Fisheries and Food
- Royal Arms of HM Government

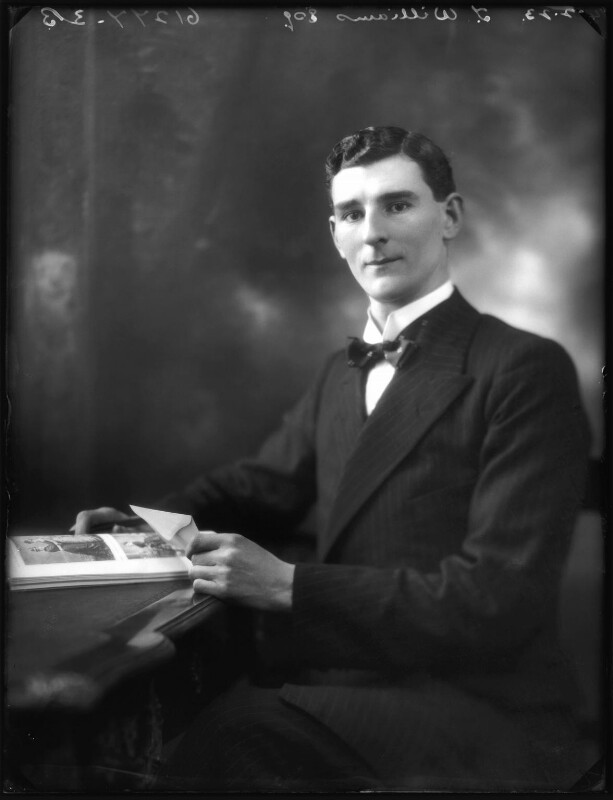
- Longest serving Tom Williams; 3 August 1945 – 26 October 1951
- Ministry of Agriculture, Fisheries and Food
- Type: Minister of the Crown
- Member of: Cabinet; Privy Council
- Reports to: The Prime Minister
- Seat: Westminster
- Nominator: The Prime Minister
- Appointer: The Monarch; (on the advice of the Prime Minister)
- Term length: At His Majesty's pleasure
- Formation: 9 September 1889
- First holder: Peter Walker
- Final holder: Nick Brown
- Abolished: 27 March 2002

The Minister of Agriculture, Fisheries and Food was a United Kingdom cabinet position, responsible for the Ministry of Agriculture, Fisheries and Food. The post was originally named President of the Board of Agriculture and was created in 1889. In 1903, an Act was passed to transfer to the new styled Board of Agriculture and Fisheries certain powers and duties relating to the fishing industry, and the post was renamed President of the Board of Agriculture and Fisheries.

In 1919, it was renamed Minister of Agriculture and Fisheries. In 1954, the separate position of Minister of Food was merged into the post and it was renamed Minister of Agriculture, Fisheries and Food.

On 8 June 2001, the Ministry merged with Secretary of State for the Environment into the office of Secretary of State for Environment, Food and Rural Affairs. However, the Ministry of Agriculture, Fisheries and Food was not formally abolished until The Ministry of Agriculture, Fisheries and Food (Dissolution) Order 2002 (S.I. 2002/794) came into force on 27 March 2002.

Until the Dissolution Order also made the necessary amendments to the law when it did come into force, many statutory functions were still vested in the holder of the office of Minister of Agriculture, Fisheries and Food, rather in the Secretary of State at large. For that reason, in a final twist, Margaret Beckett had to be appointed formally as the last Minister of Agriculture, Fisheries and Food as well as becoming the first Secretary of State for Environment, Food and Rural Affairs.

The position was the last cabinet appointment (except that of Prime Minister) in the United Kingdom government to bear the 'Minister' title; since its abolition, heads of all government departments have been Secretaries of State or Chancellors. The title continues to be used for junior ranking ministers in charge of sub-portfolios, styled Ministers of State.

== List of Agriculture Ministers and Board Presidents ==
=== Presidents of the Board of Agriculture (1889–1903) ===
Post created by the Board of Agriculture Act 1889.

President of the Board of Agriculture
Portrait	Name (Birth–Death)	Term of office		Party	Ministry
	Henry Chaplin; MP for Sleaford (1840–1923)	9 September 1889	11 August 1892	Conservative	Salisbury II
	Herbert Gardner; MP for Saffron Walden (1846–1921)	25 August 1892	21 June 1895	Liberal	Gladstone IV
	Herbert Gardner; MP for Saffron Walden (1846–1921)	25 August 1892	21 June 1895	Liberal	Rosebery
	Walter Long; MP for Liverpool West Derby (1854–1924)	4 July 1895	16 November 1900	Conservative	Salisbury (III & IV) (Con.–Lib.U.)
	Robert William Hanbury; MP for Preston (1845–1903)	16 November 1900	28 April 1903	Conservative	Salisbury (III & IV) (Con.–Lib.U.)
	Robert William Hanbury; MP for Preston (1845–1903)	16 November 1900	28 April 1903	Conservative	Balfour (Con.–Lib.U.)

=== Presidents of the Board of Agriculture and Fisheries (1903–1919) ===
Board of Agriculture superseded by the Board of Agriculture and Fisheries in 1903.

President of the Board of Agriculture and Fisheries
Portrait	Name (Birth–Death)	Term of office		Party	Ministry
	William Onslow; 4th Earl of Onslow (1853–1911)	19 May 1903	12 March 1905	Conservative	Balfour (Con.–Lib.U.)
	Ailwyn Fellowes; MP for Ramsey (1855–1924)	12 March 1905	4 December 1905	Conservative	Balfour (Con.–Lib.U.)
	Charles Wynn-Carington; 1st Earl Carrington (1843–1928)	10 December 1905	23 October 1911	Liberal	Campbell-Bannerman
	Charles Wynn-Carington; 1st Earl Carrington (1843–1928)	10 December 1905	23 October 1911	Liberal	Asquith (I–III)
	Walter Runciman; MP for Dewsbury (1870–1949)	23 October 1911	6 August 1914	Liberal	Asquith (I–III)
	Auberon Herbert; 9th Baron Lucas (1876–1916)	6 August 1914	25 May 1915	Liberal	Asquith (I–III)
	William Palmer; 2nd Earl of Selborne (1859–1942)	25 May 1915	11 July 1916	Conservative	Asquith Coalition (Lib.–Con.–Lab.)
	David Lindsay; 27th Earl of Crawford (1871–1940)	11 July 1916	10 December 1916	Conservative	Asquith Coalition (Lib.–Con.–Lab.)
	Rowland Prothero; MP for Oxford University (1851–1937)	10 December 1916	15 August 1919	Conservative	Lloyd George (I & II) (Lib.–Con.–Lab.)

=== Ministers of Agriculture and Fisheries, (1919–1954) ===
Minister of Agriculture and Fisheries
Portrait	Name (Birth–Death)	Term of office		Party	Ministry
	Arthur Lee; 1st Baron Lee of Fareham (1868–1947)	15 August 1919	13 February 1921	Conservative	Lloyd George (I & II) (Lib.–Con.–Lab.)
	Sir Arthur Griffith-Boscawen; MP for Taunton (1865–1946)	13 February 1921	24 October 1922	Conservative	Lloyd George (I & II) (Lib.–Con.–Lab.)
	Sir Robert Sanders; 1st Baronet; MP for Bridgwater (1867–1940) (Note: Sanders lost his seat at the 1923 general election.)	24 October 1922	22 January 1924	Conservative	Law
	Sir Robert Sanders; 1st Baronet; MP for Bridgwater (1867–1940)	24 October 1922	22 January 1924	Conservative	Baldwin I
	Noel Buxton; MP for North Norfolk (1869–1948)	22 January 1924	3 November 1924	Labour	MacDonald I
	E. F. L. Wood; MP for Ripon (1881–1959)	6 November 1924	4 November 1925	Conservative	Baldwin II
	Walter Guinness; MP for Bury St Edmunds (1880–1944)	4 November 1925	4 June 1929	Conservative	Baldwin II
	Noel Buxton; MP for North Norfolk (1869–1948)	7 June 1929	5 June 1930	Labour	MacDonald II
	Christopher Addison; MP for Swindon (1869–1951)	5 June 1930	24 August 1931	Labour	MacDonald II
	Sir John Gilmour "2ndBaronet; MP for Glasgow Pollok (1876–1940)	25 August 1931	28 September 1932	Conservative	National I (N.Lab.–Con.–Lib.N.–Lib.)
	Sir John Gilmour "2ndBaronet; MP for Glasgow Pollok (1876–1940)	25 August 1931	28 September 1932	Conservative	National II (N.Lab.–Con.–Lib.N.–Lib.)
	Walter Elliot; MP for Glasgow Kelvingrove (1888–1958)	28 September 1932	29 October 1936	Conservative	National II (N.Lab.–Con.–Lib.N.–Lib.)
	Walter Elliot; MP for Glasgow Kelvingrove (1888–1958)	28 September 1932	29 October 1936	Conservative	National III (Con.–N.Lab.–Lib.N.)
	William Morrison; MP for Cirencester and Tewkesbury (1893–1961)	29 October 1936	29 January 1939	Conservative	National III (Con.–N.Lab.–Lib.N.)
	William Morrison; MP for Cirencester and Tewkesbury (1893–1961)	29 October 1936	29 January 1939	Conservative	National IV (Con.–N.Lab.–Lib.N.)
	Sir Reginald Dorman-Smith; MP for Petersfield (1899–1977)	29 January 1939	14 May 1940	Conservative	National IV (Con.–N.Lab.–Lib.N.)
	Sir Reginald Dorman-Smith; MP for Petersfield (1899–1977)	29 January 1939	14 May 1940	Conservative	Chamberlain War (Con.–N.Lab.–Lib.N.)
	Robert Hudson; MP for Southport (1886–1957)	14 May 1940	26 July 1945	Conservative	Churchill War (All parties)
	Robert Hudson; MP for Southport (1886–1957)	14 May 1940	26 July 1945	Conservative	Churchill Caretaker (Con.–N.Lib.)
	Tom Williams; MP for Don Valley (1888–1967)	3 August 1945	26 October 1951	Labour	Attlee (I & II)
	Sir Thomas Dugdale; 1st Baronet; MP for Richmond (1897–1977)	31 October 1951	20 July 1954	Conservative	Churchill III
	Derick Heathcoat-Amory; MP for Tiverton (1899–1981)	28 July 1954	18 October 1954	Conservative	Churchill III

=== Ministers of Agriculture, Fisheries and Food (1954–2001) ===
Minister of Agriculture, Fisheries and Food
Portrait	Name (Birth–Death)	Term of office		Party	Ministry	Ref.
	Derick Heathcoat-Amory; MP for Tiverton (1899–1981)	18 October 1954	6 January 1958	Conservative	Churchill III	
	Derick Heathcoat-Amory; MP for Tiverton (1899–1981)	18 October 1954	6 January 1958	Conservative	Eden	
	Derick Heathcoat-Amory; MP for Tiverton (1899–1981)	18 October 1954	6 January 1958	Conservative	Macmillan (I & II)	
	John Hare; MP for Sudbury and Woodbridge (1911–1982)	6 January 1958	27 July 1960	Conservative	Macmillan (I & II)	
	Christopher Soames; MP for Bedford (1920–1987)	27 July 1960	16 October 1964	Conservative	Macmillan (I & II)	
	Christopher Soames; MP for Bedford (1920–1987)	27 July 1960	16 October 1964	Conservative	Douglas-Home	
	Fred Peart; MP for Workington (1914–1988)	16 October 1964	6 April 1968	Labour	Wilson (I & II)	
	Cledwyn Hughes; MP for Anglesey (1916–2001)	6 April 1968	19 June 1970	Labour	Wilson (I & II)	
	Jim Prior; MP for Lowestoft (1927–2016)	20 June 1970	5 November 1972	Conservative	Heath	
	Joseph Godber; MP for Grantham (1914–1980)	5 November 1972	4 March 1974	Conservative	Heath	
	Fred Peart; MP for Workington (1914–1988)	5 March 1974	10 September 1976	Labour	Wilson (III & IV)	
	Fred Peart; MP for Workington (1914–1988)	5 March 1974	10 September 1976	Labour	Callaghan	
	John Silkin; MP for Lewisham Deptford (1923–1987)	10 September 1976	4 May 1979	Labour	Callaghan	
	Peter Walker; MP for Worcester (1932–2010)	5 May 1979	11 June 1983	Conservative	Thatcher I	
	Michael Jopling; MP for Westmorland and Lonsdale (1930–)	11 June 1983	13 June 1987	Conservative	Thatcher II	
	John MacGregor; MP for South Norfolk (1937–)	13 June 1987	24 July 1989	Conservative	Thatcher III	
	John Gummer; MP for Suffolk Coastal (1939–)	24 July 1989	27 May 1993	Conservative	Thatcher III	
	John Gummer; MP for Suffolk Coastal (1939–)	24 July 1989	27 May 1993	Conservative	Major I	
	John Gummer; MP for Suffolk Coastal (1939–)	24 July 1989	27 May 1993	Conservative	Major II	
	Gillian Shephard; MP for South West Norfolk (1940–)	27 May 1993	20 July 1994	Conservative	Major II	
	William Waldegrave; MP for Bristol West (1946–)	20 July 1994	5 July 1995	Conservative	Major II	
	Douglas Hogg; MP for Grantham (1945–)	5 July 1995	2 May 1997	Conservative	Major II	
	Jack Cunningham; MP for Copeland (1939–)	3 May 1997	27 July 1998	Labour	Blair I	
	Nick Brown; MP for Newcastle upon Tyne East and Wallsend (1950–)	27 July 1998	8 June 2001	Labour	Blair I	

From 2002 the Ministry of Agriculture, Fisheries and Food was dissolved and ministerial responsibility formerly transferred to the Secretary of State for Environment, Food and Rural Affairs.
