= Cranley Onslow =

English politician (1926–2001)

The Right Honourable The Lord Onslow of Woking KCMG, PC
- Onslow in 1973

Chair of the 1922 Committee
- In office 1984–1992
- Leader: Margaret Thatcher; John Major
- Preceded by: Edward du Cann
- Succeeded by: Marcus Fox

Member of the House of Lords
- Lord Temporal
- Life peerage 31 October 1997 – 13 March 2001

Member of Parliament for Woking
- In office 15 October 1964 – 8 April 1997
- Preceded by: Harold Watkinson
- Succeeded by: Humfrey Malins

Personal details
- Born: Cranley Gordon Douglas Onslow; 8 June 1926 London, England
- Died: 13 March 2001 (aged 74) Hereford, England
- Party: Conservative
- Spouse: Lady June Hay (m. 1955)
- Children: 4
- Education: Harrow School, Royal Military College, Sandhurst, Oriel College, Oxford

Cranley Gordon Douglas Onslow, Baron Onslow of Woking (8 June 1926 – 13 March 2001), was an English politician who served as the Conservative MP for Woking from 1964 to 1997. He was a British peer from 1997 until his death in 2001.

== Family background ==
Onslow was born in Wandsworth, London, in 1926. He was related to the Earl of Onslow, and was named for one of the subsidiary titles of the Earldom: Viscount Cranley. His parents were Francis Robert Douglas Onslow and Mabel Strachan. He had a younger brother, Ian Denzil Onslow (1929–2013). Onslow was a descendant of George Onslow, eldest son of Lieutenant-General Richard Onslow, nephew of the first Baron and uncle of the first Earl.

== Early life and career ==
He was educated at Harrow School and then Sandhurst. He then joined the military in 1944 and was commissioned as a second lieutenant in the Queen's Own Hussars. Upon completing this service he read history at Oriel College, Oxford. Onslow then joined MI6 as an intelligence officer and had a tour of duty in Burma.

== Political career ==
Onslow resigned from the civil service in 1960 and became active in politics, first being elected to Dartford Rural District Council and later to Kent County Council. In 1963 he was selected to succeed Harold Watkinson as MP for Woking and he was elected the following year in the 1964 general election.

Once elected, Onslow demonstrated his right wing credentials by calling for lower taxes on the middle class and a reduction in third world aid. He also pursued a strong non-partisan interest in aviation, eventually chairing the Conservative aviation committee.

=== Government ===
He would later serve as Parliamentary Under Secretary of State for Aerospace from 1972 to 1974 in Edward Heath's government. In Margaret Thatcher's government he was made a Minister of State at the Foreign and Commonwealth Office in 1983, but resigned a year later after Thatcher sacked his boss, Francis Pym.

=== 1922 Committee ===
In 1984, he was elected to chair the 1922 Committee, and was therefore considered to be the most powerful backbencher in the Conservative party. In this post, he conveyed to Mrs Thatcher the desire of backbenchers that Leon Brittan should resign over the Westland affair and in the 1990 leadership contest that many backbenchers wanted a broader choice of candidates, contributing to her decision to drop out. This angered many allies of Thatcher, and in 1992 he was toppled as Chairman of the 1922 Committee by Marcus Fox.

== Honours and styles ==
=== Honours ===
Having been sworn of the Privy Council in the 1988 New Year Honours, Onslow was appointed to the Order of St Michael and St George as a Knight Commander (KCMG) for "political service" in the 1993 New Year Honours and upon stepping down from Parliament in 1997 his life peerage was announced in the Resignation Honours, and he was raised to the peerage as Baron Onslow of Woking, of Woking in the County of Surrey.

== Personal life ==
In 1955, he married Lady June Hay, daughter of George Hay, 14th Earl of Kinnoull. They had four children.

Onslow died at a hospital in Hereford on 13 March 2001, at the age of 74.

Parliament of the United Kingdom
Preceded by Harold Watkinson	Member of Parliament for Woking; 1964–1997	Succeeded by Humfrey Malins
Political offices
Preceded by Sir Edward du Cann	Chairman of the 1922 Committee; 1984–1992	Succeeded by Sir Marcus Fox
