= Minister of Defence (United Kingdom) =

Former Cabinet-level post in the United Kingdom

- Royal Arms of Her Majesty's Government

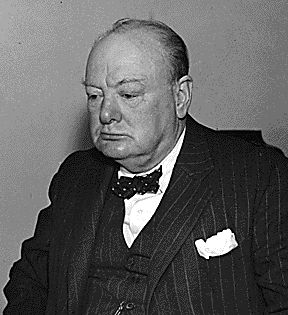
- Longest serving Winston Churchill; 10 May 1940 – 27 July 1945
- Ministry of Defence (1947–1964)
- Status: Abolished
- Member of: Cabinet
- Reports to: Prime Minister
- Appointer: The Monarch; (on the advice of the Prime Minister)
- Term length: At His Majesty's pleasure
- Precursor: Minister for Co-ordination of Defence
- Formation: 10 May 1940
- First holder: Winston Churchill
- Final holder: Peter Thorneycroft
- Abolished: 1 April 1964
- Superseded by: Secretary of State for Defence

The post of Minister of Defence was responsible for co-ordination of defence and security from its creation in 1940 until its abolition in 1964. The post was a Cabinet-level post and generally ranked above the three service ministers, some of whom, however, continued to also serve in Cabinet.

The Ministry of Defence was created in 1947.

== History ==
Prior to the outbreak of the Second World War, concerns about British forces being understrength led in 1936 to the creation of the post of Minister for Coordination of Defence by Prime Minister Stanley Baldwin. The post was abolished by Baldwin's successor Neville Chamberlain in April 1940.

On his appointment as Prime Minister in May 1940, Winston Churchill created for himself the new post of Minister of Defence. The post was created in response to previous criticism that there had been no clear single minister in charge of the prosecution of the war. In 1946, the post became the only cabinet-level post representing the military, with the three service ministers—the Secretary of State for War, the First Lord of the Admiralty, and the Secretary of State for Air—now formally subordinated to the Minister of Defence.

In 1964, the creation of a single, merged Ministry of Defence and the abolition of the separate service ministries in the UK led to the creation of the new post of Secretary of State for Defence, more popularly known as Defence Secretary.

Principal political leaders of the English/British Armed Forces:
| | Royal Navy | British Army | Royal Air Force | Co-ordination |
| 1628 | First Lord of the Admiralty (1628–1964) | | | |
| 1794 | First Lord of the Admiralty (1628–1964) | Secretary of State for War (1794–1801) | | |
| 1801 | First Lord of the Admiralty (1628–1964) | Secretary of State for War and the Colonies (1801–1854) | | |
| 1854 | First Lord of the Admiralty (1628–1964) | Secretary of State for War (1854–1964) | | |
| 1919 | First Lord of the Admiralty (1628–1964) | Secretary of State for War (1854–1964) | Secretary of State for Air (1919–1964) | |
| 1936 | First Lord of the Admiralty (1628–1964) | Secretary of State for War (1854–1964) | Secretary of State for Air (1919–1964) | Minister for Co-ordination of Defence (1936–1940) |
| 1940 | First Lord of the Admiralty (1628–1964) | Secretary of State for War (1854–1964) | Secretary of State for Air (1919–1964) | Minister of Defence (1940–1964) |
| 1964 | Secretary of State for Defence (1964–present) | | | |

== Ministers of Defence, 1940–1964 ==
| Portrait | Name (born–died) | Term of office | | | Political party | Cabinet |
| Portrait | Name (born–died) | Took office | Left office | Time in office | Political party | Cabinet |
|---|---|---|---|---|---|---|
| | Winston Churchill; MP for Epping (1874–1965) | 10 May 1940 | 27 July 1945 | 5 years, 78 days | Conservative | Churchill War |
| | Winston Churchill; MP for Epping (1874–1965) | 10 May 1940 | 27 July 1945 | 5 years, 78 days | Conservative | Churchill Caretaker |
| | Clement Attlee; MP for Limehouse (1883–1967) | 27 July 1945 | 20 December 1946 | 1 year, 146 days | Labour | Attlee I |
| | A. V. Alexander; MP for Sheffield Hillsborough (1885–1965) | 20 December 1946 | 28 February 1950 | 3 years, 70 days | Labour Co-op | Attlee I |
| | Emanuel Shinwell; MP for Easington (1884–1986) | 28 February 1950 | 26 October 1951 | 1 year, 240 days | Labour | Attlee II |
| | Winston Churchill; MP for Woodford (1874–1965) | 28 October 1951 | 1 March 1952 | 127 days | Conservative | Churchill III |
| | Harold Alexander; 1st Earl Alexander of Tunis (1891–1969) | 1 March 1952 | 18 October 1954 | 2 years, 231 days | Independent | Churchill III |
| | Harold Macmillan; MP for Bromley (1894–1986) | 18 October 1954 | 7 April 1955 | 171 days | Conservative | Churchill III |
| | Selwyn Lloyd; MP for The Wirral (1904–1978) | 7 April 1955 | 20 December 1955 | 257 days | Conservative | Eden |
| | Walter Monckton; MP for Bristol West (1891–1965) | 20 December 1955 | 18 October 1956 | 303 days | Conservative | Eden |
| | Antony Head; MP for Carshalton (1906–1983) | 18 October 1956 | 9 January 1957 | 83 days | Conservative | Eden |
| | Duncan Sandys; MP for Streatham (1906–1987) | 13 January 1957 | 14 October 1959 | 2 years, 274 days | Conservative | Macmillan I |
| | Harold Watkinson; MP for Woking (1910–1995) | 14 October 1959 | 13 July 1962 | 2 years, 272 days | Conservative | Macmillan II |
| | Peter Thorneycroft; MP for Monmouth (1909–1994) | 13 July 1962 | 1 April 1964 | 1 year, 263 days | Conservative | Macmillan II |
| | Peter Thorneycroft; MP for Monmouth (1909–1994) | 13 July 1962 | 1 April 1964 | 1 year, 263 days | Conservative | Douglas-Home |

The post of Minister of Defence was abolished in 1964 and replaced by the new post of Secretary of State for Defence.

== See also ==
- Ministry of Defence (1947–1964)
