= Parliamentary Secretary to the Ministry of Supply =

Minister in the UK Government

The Parliamentary Secretary to the Ministry of Supply was a role in the Government of the United Kingdom. The office was abolished on 22 October 1959.

== List of officeholders ==
Office	Dates	Party	Prime Minister	Ministry
John Llewellin	14 July 1939 – 1940	Conservative	Neville Chamberlain & Winston Churchill	National Government, Chamberlain war ministry
Harold Macmillan	15 May 1940 – 4 February 1942	Conservative	Winston Churchill	Churchill war ministry
Wyndham Portal, 1st Baron Portal	4 September 1940 – 22 February 1942	Conservative	Winston Churchill	Churchill war ministry
Ralph Assheton	4 February 1942 – 7 February 1943	Conservative	Winston Churchill	Churchill war ministry
Charles Peat	4 March 1942 – 22 March 1945	Conservative	Winston Churchill	Churchill war ministry
Duncan Sandys	7 February 1943 – 21 November 1944	Conservative	Winston Churchill	Churchill war ministry
John Wilmot	21 November 1944 – 23 May 1945	Labour	Winston Churchill	Churchill war ministry
James de Rothschild	22 March 1945 – 23 May 1945	Labour	Winston Churchill	Churchill war ministry
William Leonard	4 August 1945 – 7 October 1947	Labour	Clement Attlee	Attlee ministry
Arthur Woodburn	1 April 1946 – 7 October 1947	Labour	Clement Attlee	Attlee ministry
John Freeman	7 October 1947 – 23 April 1951	Labour	Clement Attlee	Attlee ministry
John Henry Jones	7 October 1947 – 2 March 1950	Labour	Clement Attlee	Attlee ministry
Michael Stewart	2 May 1951 – 26 October 1951	Labour	Clement Attlee	Attlee ministry
Toby Low	3 November 1951	Conservative	Winston Churchill	Third Churchill ministry
Sir Edward Boyle	28 July 1954	Conservative	Winston Churchill	Third Churchill ministry
Frederick Erroll	7 April 1955	Conservative	Anthony Eden	Eden ministry
Ian Harvey	11 November 1956	Conservative	Anthony Eden	Eden ministry
William Taylor	18 January 1957	Conservative	Harold Macmillan	Conservative government, 1957–1964
