= Woking (constituency) =

Parliamentary constituency in the United Kingdom, 1950 onwards

Coordinates: 51.31°N 0.55°W

- Borough constituency for the House of Commons
- Boundaries since 2024
- Boundary of Woking in South East England
- County: Surrey
- Electorate: 71,737 (2023)
- Major settlements: Woking; Byfleet; Brookwood

Current constituency
- Created: 1950
- Member of Parliament: Will Forster (Liberal Democrat)
- Created from: Farnham (Majority); Chertsey (Part)
- During its existence contributed to new seat(s) of: Surrey Heath (1997)

Woking is a constituency represented in the House of Commons of the UK Parliament since 2024 by Will Forster, a Liberal Democrat. Since it was first created for the 1950 general election, it had only ever returned Conservative Party candidates until it elected a Liberal Democrat for the first time in 2024.

== Constituency profile ==
The seat comprises the Borough of Woking, which has one main town: Woking. Voters are, on average, wealthier than the UK average.

== History ==
The seat was created in 1950 from the county constituencies of Chertsey and lightly populated parts of Farnham. (Note: All extant UK seats elect one Member of Parliament (MP) by the first past the post system of election, as from the outset in Woking in 1950)

Prior to 2024, and with exceptions only in 1974 (February election), 1997, 2005 and 2010, this constituency returned a Conservative with majorities exceeding 15% of votes cast.

At the 2015 and 2017 general elections, the Labour candidates polled in second place, whereas in 2019 the Lib Dem candidate did so. Until the election of 2024, similar second place results had been emulated locally eight and nine times respectively by Labour and the Lib Dems.

A Conservative win by 11.2% of the vote in 1997 was a notably marginal result. By contrast, at the 2015 general election the seat was the 41st-safest of the Conservative Party's 331 seats by percentage of majority, 40 percentage points ahead of Labour.

By 2024, the Liberal Democrats had a very sizeable majority on Woking Borough Council and there were no Conservative councillors left on the authority, although historically the Conservatives had been the dominant force on the council, with only the Canalside ward (containing the district of Sheerwater) that often returns Labour councillors.

Local Conservatives won the previously relevant (Guildford Council) wards of Pirbright and Normandy over many election cycles, but these two villages were transferred to the Surrey Heath constituency from 2024 onwards following boundary changes.

== Boundaries ==
Map of 1997–2024 boundaries

=== Historic ===
1950–74: The Urban Districts of Frimley and Camberley, and Woking, and in the Rural District of Guildford the parishes of Ash, Normandy, and Pirbright.

1974–83: as above less Frimley and Camberley (transferred to North West Surrey – which was subsequently abolished in 1997, but replaced in large part at that point by the new Surrey Heath constituency). Note that in 1974 these areas constituted the whole of Woking (borough) and a part of Guildford (borough).

1983–97: unchanged (i.e. The Borough of Woking, and the Borough of Guildford wards of Ash, Ash Vale, Normandy, and Pirbright).

1997–2024: as above less Ash and Ash Vale (transferred to Surrey Heath).

The Boundary Commission made no changes to the Woking constituency in the Parliamentary boundary review that took place prior to the 2010 General Election.

=== Current ===
Further to the 2023 periodic review of Westminster constituencies which came into effect for the 2024 general election, the size of the electorate was reduced by transferring the wards of Pirbright and Normandy to the constituency of Surrey Heath. The constituency boundaries of Woking thereby became coterminous with those of the Borough of Woking, comprising the ten Woking Borough Council wards of:

- Byfleet & West Byfleet; Canalside; Goldsworth Park; Heathlands; Hoe Valley; Horsell; Knaphill; Mount Hermon; Pyrford; and St. John's.

== Members of Parliament ==
Election	Member	Party	Notes
1950	Harold Watkinson	Conservative	Minister of Defence (1959–1962)
1964	Cranley Onslow	Conservative	Chair of the 1922 Committee (1984–1992)
1997	Humfrey Malins	Conservative	Member for Croydon North West (1983–1992)
2010	Jonathan Lord	Conservative	
2024	Will Forster	Liberal Democrats	

== Elections ==
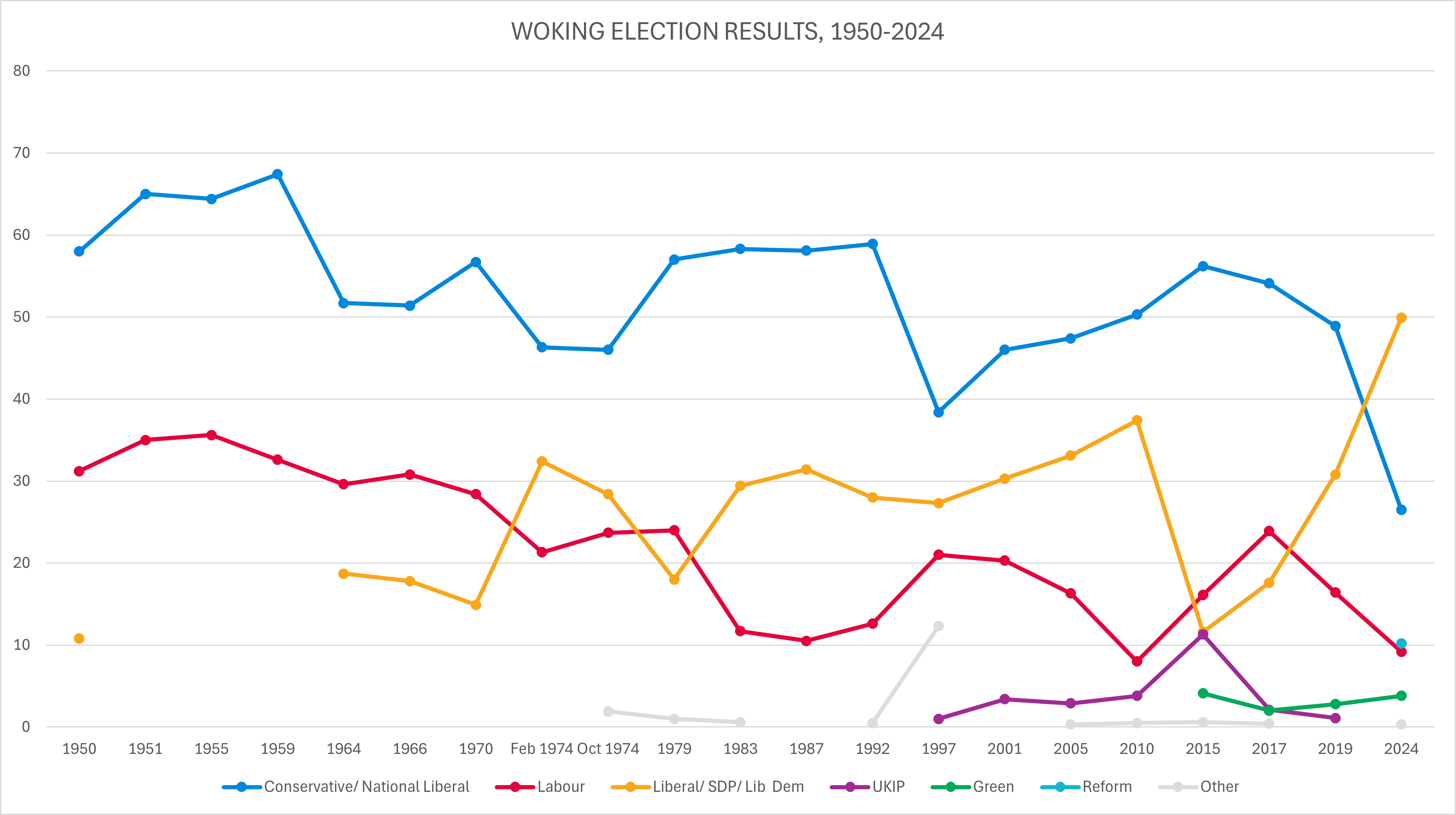
Election results 1950-2024

=== Elections in the 2020s ===
General election 2024: Woking
Party	Candidate	Votes	%	±%
Liberal Democrats	Will Forster	24,019	49.9	▲18.8
Conservative	Jonathan Lord	12,773	26.5	▼21.8
Reform	Richard Barker	4,888	10.2	new
Labour	Ese Erheriene	4,444	9.2	▼7.5
Green	Nataly Anderson	1,853	3.8	▲1.0
Heritage	Tim Read	168	0.3	new
Majority		11,246	23.4	
Turnout		48,145	66.0	▼4.4
Registered electors		72,977		
Liberal Democrats gain from Conservative		Swing	▲20.3	

=== Elections in the 2010s ===
2019 notional result
Party	Vote	%
Conservative	24,358	48.3
Liberal Democrats	15,675	31.1
Labour	8,444	16.7
Green	1,398	2.8
Others	600	1.2
Turnout	50,475	70.4
Electorate	71,737	

General election 2019: Woking
Party	Candidate	Votes	%	±%
Conservative	Jonathan Lord	26,396	48.9	−5.2
Liberal Democrats	Will Forster	16,629	30.8	+13.2
Labour	Gerry Mitchell	8,827	16.4	−7.5
Green	Ella Walding	1,485	2.8	+0.8
UKIP	Troy de Leon	600	1.1	−1.0
Majority		9,767	18.1	−12.1
Turnout		53,937	71.5	−1.0
Registered electors		75,455		
Conservative hold		Swing	−9.3	

General election 2017: Woking
Party	Candidate	Votes	%	±%
Conservative	Jonathan Lord	29,903	54.1	−2.1
Labour	Fiona Colley	13,179	23.9	+7.8
Liberal Democrats	Will Forster	9,711	17.6	+6.0
UKIP	Troy de Leon	1,161	2.1	−9.2
Green	James Brierley	1,092	2.0	−2.1
Independent	Hassan Akberali	200	0.4	N/A
Majority		16,724	30.2	−9.8
Turnout		55,246	72.5	+2.5
Registered electors				
Conservative hold		Swing	−4.9	

General election 2015: Woking
Party	Candidate	Votes	%	±%
Conservative	Jonathan Lord	29,199	56.2	+5.9
Labour	Jill Rawling	8,389	16.1	+8.1
Liberal Democrats	Chris Took	6,047	11.6	−25.8
UKIP	Rob Burberry	5,873	11.3	+7.5
Green	Martin Robson	2,109	4.1	N/A
CISTA	Declan Wade	229	0.4	N/A
Magna Carta Conservation Party Great Britain	Ruth Temple	77	0.1	±0.0
The Evolution Party	Angela Woolford	41	0.1	N/A
Majority		20,810	40.0	+27.1
Turnout		51,964	70.0	−1.5
Registered electors				
Conservative hold		Swing	−1.1	

General election 2010: Woking
Party	Candidate	Votes	%	±%
Conservative	Jonathan Lord	26,551	50.3	+2.9
Liberal Democrats	Rosie Sharpley	19,744	37.4	+4.3
Labour	Tom Miller	4,246	8.0	−8.3
UKIP	Rob Burberry	1,997	3.8	+0.9
Peace	Julie Roxburgh	204	0.4	N/A
Magna Carta Conservation Party Great Britain	Ruth Temple	44	0.1	N/A
Majority		6,807	12.9	−1.5
Turnout		52,786	71.5	+8.1
Registered electors				
Conservative hold		Swing	−0.7	

=== Elections in the 2000s ===
General election 2005: Woking
Party	Candidate	Votes	%	±%
Conservative	Humfrey Malins	21,838	47.4	+1.4
Liberal Democrats	Anne Lee	15,226	33.1	+2.8
Labour	Ellie Blagbrough	7,507	16.3	−4.0
UKIP	Matthew Davies	1,324	2.9	−0.5
UK Community Issues Party	Michael Osman	150	0.3	N/A
Majority		6,612	14.4	−1.3
Turnout		46,045	63.4	+3.2
Registered electors				
Conservative hold		Swing	−0.7	

General election 2001: Woking
Party	Candidate	Votes	%	±%
Conservative	Humfrey Malins	19,747	46.0	+7.6
Liberal Democrats	Alan Hilliar	12,988	30.3	+3.0
Labour	Sabir Hussain	8,714	20.3	−0.7
UKIP	Michael Harvey	1,461	3.4	+2.4
Majority		6,759	15.7	+4.6
Turnout		42,910	60.2	−12.5
Registered electors				
Conservative hold		Swing	+2.3	

=== Elections in the 1990s ===
General election 1997: Woking
Party	Candidate	Votes	%	±%
Conservative	Humfrey Malins	19,553	38.4	−20.7
Liberal Democrats	Philip Goldenberg	13,875	27.3	+0.2
Labour	Katie Hanson	10,695	21.0	+7.6
Ind. Conservative	Hugh Bell	3,933	7.7	N/A
Referendum	Christopher Skeate	2,209	4.3	N/A
UKIP	Michael Harvey	512	1.0	N/A
Natural Law	Deirdre Sleeman	137	0.3	−0.2
Majority		5,678	11.1	−19.9
Turnout		50,914	72.7	−6.5
Registered electors				
Conservative hold		Swing	−10.3	

This constituency underwent boundary changes between the 1992 and 1997 general elections and thus change in share of vote is based on a notional calculation.

General election 1992: Woking
Party	Candidate	Votes	%	±%
Conservative	Cranley Onslow	37,744	58.9	+0.8
Liberal Democrats	Dorothy Buckrell	17,902	28.0	−3.4
Labour	James Dalgleish	8,080	12.6	+2.1
Natural Law	Teresa Macintyre	302	0.5	N/A
Majority		19,842	31.0	+4.3
Turnout		64,028	79.2	+4.1
Registered electors				
Conservative hold		Swing	+2.1	

=== Elections in the 1980s ===
General election 1987: Woking
Party	Candidate	Votes	%	±%
Conservative	Cranley Onslow	35,990	58.1	−0.2
Liberal	Philip Goldenberg	19,446	31.4	+2.0
Labour	Anita Pollack	6,537	10.5	−1.2
Majority		16,544	26.7	−2.2
Turnout		61,973	75.1	+3.4
Registered electors				
Conservative hold		Swing	−1.1	

General election 1983: Woking
Party	Candidate	Votes	%	±%
Conservative	Cranley Onslow	32,748	58.3	+1.3
Liberal	Philip Goldenberg	16,511	29.4	+11.4
Labour	Barbara Broer	6,566	11.7	−6.3
Party of Associates with Licensees	D. M. Comens	368	0.6	N/A
Majority		16,237	28.9	−4.2
Turnout		56,193	71.7	−4.8
Registered electors				
Conservative hold		Swing	−5.1	

=== Elections in the 1970s ===
General election 1979: Woking
Party	Candidate	Votes	%	±%
Conservative	Cranley Onslow	31,719	57.05	+11.01
Labour	Nigel Beard	13,327	23.97	+0.27
Liberal	George H. Dunk	9,991	17.97	−10.43
National Front	P. A. Gleave	564	1.01	−0.85
Majority		18,392	33.08	+15.44
Turnout		55,601	76.51	+3.58
Registered electors				
Conservative hold		Swing	+5.4	

General election October 1974: Woking
Party	Candidate	Votes	%	±%
Conservative	Cranley Onslow	22,804	46.04	−0.29
Liberal	P. Wade	14,069	28.40	−4.01
Labour	J. W. Tattersall	11,737	23.70	+2.44
National Front	R. Vaughan-Smith	921	1.86	N/A
Majority		8,735	17.64	+3.72
Turnout		49,531	72.93	−7.94
Registered electors				
Conservative hold		Swing	+1.9	

General election February 1974: Woking
Party	Candidate	Votes	%	±%
Conservative	Cranley Onslow	25,243	46.33	−10.38
Liberal	P. Wade	17,660	32.41	+17.54
Labour	J. W. Tattersall	11,583	21.26	−7.16
Majority		7,583	13.92	−14.37
Turnout		54,486	80.87	+10.99
Registered electors				
Conservative hold		Swing	−14.0	

General election 1970: Woking
Party	Candidate	Votes	%	±%
Conservative	Cranley Onslow	37,220	56.71	+5.31
Labour	R. M. Taylor	18,652	28.42	−2.38
Liberal	P. Wade	9,763	14.87	−2.93
Majority		18,568	28.29	+7.69
Turnout		65,635	69.88	−7.23
Registered electors				
Conservative hold		Swing	+3.8	

=== Elections in the 1960s ===
General election 1966: Woking
Party	Candidate	Votes	%	±%
Conservative	Cranley Onslow	32,057	51.40	−0.30
Labour	Michael Downing	19,210	30.80	+1.22
Liberal	Agnes H. Scott	11,104	17.80	−0.92
Majority		12,847	20.60	−1.52
Turnout		62,371	77.11	−0.98
Registered electors				
Conservative hold		Swing	−0.8	

General election 1964: Woking
Party	Candidate	Votes	%	±%
Conservative	Cranley Onslow	31,170	51.70	−15.70
Labour	H. G. N. Clother	17,834	29.58	−3.02
Liberal	Agnes H. Scott	11,285	18.72	N/A
Majority		13,336	22.12	−12.68
Turnout		60,289	78.09	+0.74
Registered electors				
Conservative hold		Swing	−6.3	

=== Elections in the 1950s ===
General election 1959: Woking
Party	Candidate	Votes	%	±%
Conservative	Harold Watkinson	33,521	67.40	+2.99
Labour	R David Vaughan Williams	16,210	32.60	−2.99
Majority		17,311	34.80	+5.98
Turnout		49,731	77.35	+1.63
Registered electors				
Conservative hold		Swing	+3.0	

General election 1955: Woking
Party	Candidate	Votes	%	±%
Conservative	Harold Watkinson	27,860	64.41	−0.54
Labour	R David Vaughan Williams	15,393	35.59	+0.54
Majority		12,467	28.82	−1.08
Turnout		43,253	75.72	−3.01
Registered electors				
Conservative hold		Swing	−0.5	

General election 1951: Woking
Party	Candidate	Votes	%	±%
Conservative	Harold Watkinson	26,522	64.95	+6.97
Labour	W. Eric Wolff	14,313	35.05	+3.86
Majority		12,209	29.90	+3.11
Turnout		40,835	78.73	−4.51
Registered electors				
Conservative hold		Swing	+1.6	

General election 1950: Woking
Party	Candidate	Votes	%
Conservative	Harold Watkinson	24,454	57.98
Labour	T. Davies	13,157	31.19
Liberal	Michael Turner-Bridger	4,567	10.83
Majority		11,297	26.79
Turnout		42,178	83.24
Registered electors			
Conservative win (new seat)			

== See also ==
- List of parliamentary constituencies in Surrey
- List of parliamentary constituencies in the South East England (region)

== Sources ==
- "Election result, 2015". BBC News Online.
- "Election result, 2010". BBC News Online.
- "Election result, 2005". BBC News Online.
- "Election results, 1997–2001". BBC News Online.
- "Election results, 1997–2001". Election Demon.
- "Election results, 1983–1992". Election Demon.
- "Election results, 1950–1979". Politics Resources.
