= Secretary of State for War =

Former position in the government of the United Kingdom (1794–1801, 1854–1964)

- Royal Arms as used by His Majesty's Government
- War Office
- Member of: British Cabinet; Privy Council
- Seat: Westminster, London
- Appointer: The British Monarch (on advice of the Prime Minister)
- Term length: No fixed term
- Formation: 11 July 1794
- First holder: Henry Dundas
- Final holder: James Ramsden
- Abolished: 1 April 1964
- Deputy: Under-Secretary of State for War

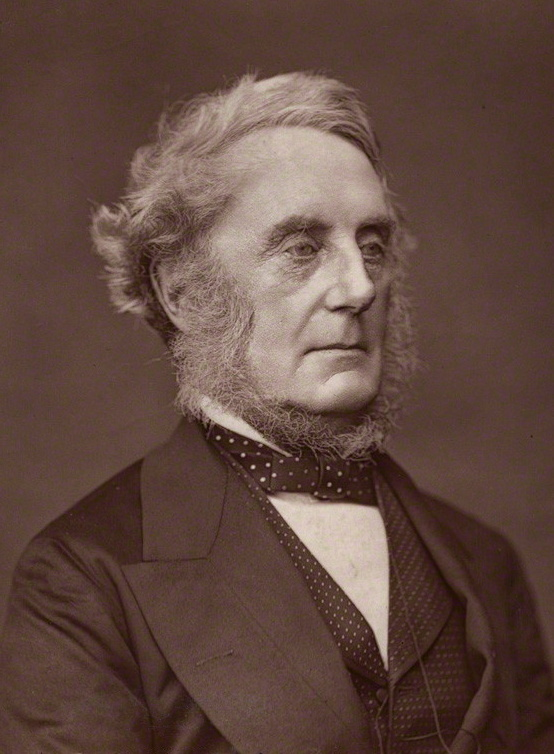
Edward Cardwell, later Viscount Cardwell, Secretary of State for War from 1868 to 1874; architect of the Cardwell Reforms

The Secretary of State for War, commonly called the War Secretary, was a secretary of state in the Government of the United Kingdom. The position existed from 1794 to 1801 and again from 1854 to 1964. The Secretary of State for War headed the War Office and was assisted by an under-secretary, a parliamentary private secretary who was also a member of parliament (MP), and a military secretary, who was a general.

== History ==
The position of Secretary of State for War was first held by Henry Dundas who was appointed in 1794. In 1801, the post became that of Secretary of State for War and the Colonies. The post was re-instated in 1854 when the Secretary of State for the Colonies was created as a separate position.

In the 19th century, the post was twice held by future prime minister Henry Campbell-Bannerman. At the outset of the First World War, prime minister H. H. Asquith was filling the role, but he quickly appointed Lord Kitchener, who became famous while in this position for the "Kitchener Wants You" posters. He was replaced by David Lloyd George, who went on to become prime minister. Between the World Wars, the post was held by future prime minister Winston Churchill for two years.

In 1946, the three posts of Secretary of State for War, First Lord of the Admiralty, and Secretary of State for Air became formally subordinated to that of Minister of Defence, which had itself been created in 1940 for the co-ordination of defence and security issues.

In the 1960s, John Profumo held this post at the time of the Profumo affair.

On 1 April 1964, with the creation of a new united Ministry of Defence headed by the Secretary of State for Defence, the three service ministries as well as the post of Minister of Defence as created in 1940 were abolished.

== List of secretaries of state ==
=== Secretary of State for War, 1794–1801 ===
Secretary	Term of office		Political party	Prime Minister
Henry Dundas (also President of the Board of Control)	11 July 1794	17 March 1801	Tory	William Pitt the Younger

For 1801–1854 see Secretary of State for War and the Colonies.

=== Secretaries of state for war, 1854–1964 ===
Name	Portrait	Term of office		Political party	Prime Minister	
	Henry Pelham-Clinton, 5th Duke of Newcastle	12 June 1854	30 January 1855	Peelite	George Hamilton-Gordon, 4th Earl of Aberdeen (Coalition)	
	Fox Maule-Ramsay, 2nd Baron Panmure	8 February 1855	21 February 1858	Whig	Edward Smith-Stanley, 14th Earl of Derby	
	Jonathan Peel	26 February 1858	11 June 1859	Conservative	Edward Smith-Stanley, 14th Earl of Derby	
	Sidney Herbert	18 June 1859	22 July 1861	Liberal	Henry John Temple, 3rd Viscount Palmerston	
	Sir George Cornewall Lewis, 2nd Baronet	23 July 1861	13 April 1863	Liberal	Henry John Temple, 3rd Viscount Palmerston	
	George Robinson, 3rd Earl de Grey and 2nd Earl of Ripon	28 April 1863	16 February 1866	Liberal	Henry John Temple, 3rd Viscount Palmerston	
	George Robinson, 3rd Earl de Grey and 2nd Earl of Ripon	28 April 1863	16 February 1866	Liberal	John Russell, 1st Earl Russell	
	Spencer Cavendish, Marquess of Hartington	16 February 1866	26 June 1866	Liberal	John Russell, 1st Earl Russell	
	Jonathan Peel	6 July 1866	8 March 1867	Conservative	14th Earl of Derby	
	John Pakington, 1st Baron Hampton	8 March 1867	1 December 1868	Conservative	14th Earl of Derby	
	John Pakington, 1st Baron Hampton	8 March 1867	1 December 1868	Conservative	Benjamin Disraeli	
	Edward Cardwell	9 December 1868	17 February 1874	Liberal	William Ewart Gladstone	
	Gathorne Hardy	21 February 1874	2 April 1878	Conservative	Benjamin Disraeli	
	Frederick Stanley	2 April 1878	21 April 1880	Conservative	Benjamin Disraeli	
	Hugh Childers	28 April 1880	16 December 1882	Liberal	William Ewart Gladstone	
	Spencer Cavendish, Marquess of Hartington	16 December 1882	9 June 1885	Liberal	William Ewart Gladstone	
	W. H. Smith	24 June 1885	21 January 1886	Conservative	Robert Gascoyne-Cecil, 3rd Marquess of Salisbury	
	Gathorne Gathorne-Hardy, 1st Earl of Cranbrook	21 January 1886	6 February 1886	Conservative	Robert Gascoyne-Cecil, 3rd Marquess of Salisbury	
	Henry Campbell-Bannerman	6 February 1886	20 July 1886	Liberal	William Ewart Gladstone	
	W. H. Smith	3 August 1886	14 January 1887	Conservative	Robert Gascoyne-Cecil, 3rd Marquess of Salisbury	
	Edward Stanhope	14 January 1887	11 August 1892	Conservative	Robert Gascoyne-Cecil, 3rd Marquess of Salisbury	
	Henry Campbell-Bannerman	18 August 1892	21 June 1895	Liberal	William Ewart Gladstone	
	Henry Campbell-Bannerman	18 August 1892	21 June 1895	Liberal	Archibald Primrose, 5th Earl of Rosebery	
	Henry Petty-Fitzmaurice, 5th Marquess of Lansdowne	4 July 1895	12 November 1900	Liberal Unionist	Robert Gascoyne-Cecil, 3rd Marquess of Salisbury (Unionist Coalition)	
	St John Brodrick	12 November 1900	6 October 1903	Irish Unionist	Robert Gascoyne-Cecil, 3rd Marquess of Salisbury (Unionist Coalition)	
	St John Brodrick	12 November 1900	6 October 1903	Irish Unionist	Arthur Balfour (Unionist Coalition)	
	H. O. Arnold-Forster	6 October 1903	4 December 1905	Liberal Unionist	Arthur Balfour (Unionist Coalition)	
	Richard Haldane (Viscount Haldane from 1911)	10 December 1905	12 June 1912	Liberal	Henry Campbell-Bannerman	
	Richard Haldane (Viscount Haldane from 1911)	10 December 1905	12 June 1912	Liberal	H. H. Asquith	
	J. E. B. Seely	12 June 1912	30 March 1914	Liberal	H. H. Asquith	
	H. H. Asquith (while Prime Minister)	30 March 1914	5 August 1914	Liberal	H. H. Asquith	
	Herbert Kitchener, 1st Earl Kitchener	5 August 1914	5 June 1916	none	H. H. Asquith	
	Herbert Kitchener, 1st Earl Kitchener	5 August 1914	5 June 1916	none	H. H. Asquith (Coalition)	
	David Lloyd George	6 July 1916	5 December 1916	Liberal	H. H. Asquith (Coalition)	
	Edward Stanley, 17th Earl of Derby	10 December 1916	18 April 1918	Conservative	David Lloyd George (Coalition)	
	Alfred Milner, 1st Viscount Milner	18 April 1918	10 January 1919	Conservative	David Lloyd George (Coalition)	
	Winston Churchill	10 January 1919	13 February 1921	Liberal	David Lloyd George (Coalition)	
	Sir Laming Worthington-Evans, 1st Baronet	13 February 1921	19 October 1922	Conservative	David Lloyd George (Coalition)	
	Edward Stanley, 17th Earl of Derby	24 October 1922	22 January 1924	Conservative	Bonar Law	
	Edward Stanley, 17th Earl of Derby	24 October 1922	22 January 1924	Conservative	Stanley Baldwin	
	Stephen Walsh	22 January 1924	3 November 1924	Labour	Ramsay MacDonald	
	Sir Laming Worthington-Evans, 1st Baronet	6 November 1924	4 June 1929	Conservative	Stanley Baldwin	
	Thomas Shaw	7 June 1929	24 August 1931	Labour	Ramsay MacDonald	
	Robert Crewe-Milnes, 1st Marquess of Crewe	25 August 1931	5 November 1931	Liberal	Ramsay MacDonald (1st National Min.)	
	Douglas Hogg, 1st Viscount Hailsham	5 November 1931	7 June 1935	Conservative	Ramsay MacDonald (2nd National Min.)	
	E. F. L. Wood, 3rd Viscount Halifax	7 June 1935	22 November 1935	Conservative	Stanley Baldwin (3rd National Min.)	
	Duff Cooper	22 November 1935	28 May 1937	Conservative	Stanley Baldwin (3rd National Min.)	
	Leslie Hore-Belisha	28 May 1937	5 January 1940	National Liberal	Neville Chamberlain (4th National Min.; War Coalition)	
	Oliver Stanley	5 January 1940	11 May 1940	Conservative	Neville Chamberlain (4th National Min.; War Coalition)	
	Anthony Eden	11 May 1940	22 December 1940	Conservative	P.M.	Min.Defence
	Anthony Eden	11 May 1940	22 December 1940	Conservative	Winston Churchill (War Coalition)	
	David Margesson	22 December 1940	22 February 1942	Conservative	Winston Churchill (War Coalition)	
	P. J. Grigg	22 February 1942	26 July 1945	National	Winston Churchill (War Coalition)	
	Jack Lawson	3 August 1945	4 October 1946	Labour	Attlee	Attlee
	Frederick Bellenger	4 October 1946	7 October 1947	Labour	Attlee	A.V. Alexander
	Emanuel Shinwell	7 October 1947	28 February 1950	Labour	Attlee	A.V. Alexander
	John Strachey	28 February 1950	26 October 1951	Labour	Attlee	Shinwell
	Antony Head	31 October 1951	18 October 1956	Conservative	Churchill	Churchill
	Antony Head	31 October 1951	18 October 1956	Conservative	Churchill	H. Alexander
	Antony Head	31 October 1951	18 October 1956	Conservative	Churchill	Macmillan
	Antony Head	31 October 1951	18 October 1956	Conservative	Eden	Lloyd
	Antony Head	31 October 1951	18 October 1956	Conservative	Eden	Monckton
	John Hare	18 October 1956	6 January 1958	Conservative	Eden	Head
	John Hare	18 October 1956	6 January 1958	Conservative	Macmillan	Sandys
	Christopher Soames	6 January 1958	27 July 1960	Conservative	Macmillan	Sandys
	Christopher Soames	6 January 1958	27 July 1960	Conservative	Macmillan	Watkinson
	John Profumo	27 July 1960	5 June 1963	Conservative	Macmillan	Watkinson
	John Profumo	27 July 1960	5 June 1963	Conservative	Macmillan	Thorneycroft
	Joseph Godber	27 June 1963	21 October 1963	Conservative	Macmillan	Thorneycroft
	James Ramsden	21 October 1963	1 April 1964	Conservative	Douglas-Home	Thorneycroft

== See also ==
- Secretary at War

Principal political leaders of the English/British Armed Forces:
	Royal Navy	British Army	Royal Air Force	Co-ordination
1628	First Lord of the Admiralty (1628–1964)			
1794	First Lord of the Admiralty (1628–1964)	Secretary of State for War (1794–1801)		
1801	First Lord of the Admiralty (1628–1964)	Secretary of State for War and the Colonies (1801–1854)		
1854	First Lord of the Admiralty (1628–1964)	Secretary of State for War (1854–1964)		
1919	First Lord of the Admiralty (1628–1964)	Secretary of State for War (1854–1964)	Secretary of State for Air (1919–1964)	
1936	First Lord of the Admiralty (1628–1964)	Secretary of State for War (1854–1964)	Secretary of State for Air (1919–1964)	Minister for Co-ordination of Defence (1936–1940)
1940	First Lord of the Admiralty (1628–1964)	Secretary of State for War (1854–1964)	Secretary of State for Air (1919–1964)	Minister of Defence (1940–1964)
1964	Secretary of State for Defence (1964–present)			
