= Parliamentary Secretary to the Ministry of Labour =

Parliamentary secretary to the Minister of Labour of the United Kingdom
- Ministry of Labour
- Status: Defunct
- Formation: 1916
- First holder: William Bridgeman
- Final holder: William Whitelaw
- Abolished: 1964

Parliamentary Secretary to the Ministry of Labour was a junior position within the British government, subordinate to the Minister of Labour. It was established in December 1916, at the same time as the Ministry of Labour. When the Ministry of Labour was renamed the Ministry of Labour and National Service in 1939, the position was consequently renamed Parliamentary Secretary to the Ministry of Labour and National Service. When the Ministry resumed its former name in 1959, the office once again became named Parliamentary Secretary to the Ministry of Labour. The post was abolished in 1964.

== List of Parliamentary Secretaries ==
=== Parliamentary Secretaries to the Ministry of Labour, 1916–1939 ===
| Name | Took office | Left office | Political party |
|---|---|---|---|
| William Bridgeman | 1916 | 1919 | Conservative |
| George Wardle | 1919 | 1920 | Labour |
| Anderson Montague-Barlow | 1920 | 1922 | Conservative |
| Archibald Boyd-Carpenter | 1922 | 1923 | Conservative |
| Henry Betterton | 1923 | 1924 | Conservative |
| Margaret Bondfield | 1924 | 1924 | Labour |
| Henry Betterton | 1924 | 1929 | Conservative |
| Jack Lawson | 1929 | 1931 | Labour |
| Milner Gray | 1931 | 1931 | Liberal |
| Robert Hudson | 1931 | 1935 | Conservative |
| Anthony Muirhead | 1935 | 1937 | Conservative |
| R. A. Butler | 1937 | 1938 | Conservative |
| Alan Lennox-Boyd | 1937 | 1939 | Conservative |

=== Parliamentary Secretaries to the Ministry of Labour and National Service, 1939–1959 ===
| Name | Took office | Left office | Political party |
|---|---|---|---|
| Ralph Assheton | 1939 | 1942 | Conservative |
| George Tomlinson | 1941 | 1945 | Labour |
| Malcolm McCorquodale | 1942 | 1945 | Conservative |
| Ness Edwards | 1945 | 1950 | Labour |
| Fred Lee | 1950 | 1951 | Labour |
| Sir Peter Bennett | 1951 | 1952 | Conservative |
| Harold Watkinson | 1952 | 1955 | Conservative |
| Robert Carr | 1955 | 1958 | Conservative |
| Richard Wood | 1958 | 1959 | Conservative |

=== Parliamentary Secretaries to the Ministry of Labour, 1959–1964 ===
| Name | Took office | Left office | Political party |
|---|---|---|---|
| Peter Thomas | 1959 | 1961 | Conservative |
| Alan Green | 1961 | 1962 | Conservative |
| William Whitelaw | 1962 | 1964 | Conservative |
