= Harold Watkinson =

British businessman and politician

The Right Honourable The Viscount Watkinson CH PC

Minister of Transport and Civil Aviation
- In office 20 December 1955 – 14 October 1959
- Monarch: Elizabeth II
- Prime Minister: Sir Anthony Eden; Harold Macmillan
- Preceded by: John Boyd-Carpenter
- Succeeded by: Ernest Marples

Minister of Defence
- In office 14 October 1959 – 13 July 1962
- Monarch: Elizabeth II
- Prime Minister: Harold Macmillan
- Preceded by: Duncan Sandys
- Succeeded by: Peter Thorneycroft

Member of Parliament for Woking
- In office 23 February 1950 – 26 June 1964
- Preceded by: Constituency created
- Succeeded by: Cranley Onslow

Personal details
- Born: 25 January 1910 Walton-on-Thames, Surrey, England
- Died: 19 December 1995 (aged 85) Bosham, West Sussex, England
- Party: Conservative
- Education: King's College London

Harold Arthur Watkinson, 1st Viscount Watkinson, CH, PC (25 January 1910 – 19 December 1995) was a British businessman and Conservative Party politician. He was Minister of Transport and Civil Aviation between 1955 and 1959 and a cabinet member as Minister of Defence between 1959 and 1962, when he was sacked in the Night of the Long Knives. In 1964 he was ennobled as Viscount Watkinson.

== Education and early life ==
Educated at Queen's College, Taunton, and at King's College London, Watkinson worked for the family engineering business between 1929 and 1935 and in technical and engineering journalism between 1935 and 1939. He saw active service as a Lieutenant-Commander in the Royal Naval Volunteer Reserve during the Second World War.

== Political career ==
Watkinson was elected Member of Parliament (MP) for the new constituency of Woking, Surrey in 1950, holding the seat until 1964, and was initially Parliamentary Private Secretary (PPS) to the Minister of Transport and Civil Aviation, John Maclay, from 1951 to 1952. He became a government member under Winston Churchill as Parliamentary Secretary to the Ministry of Labour and National Service in 1952, a post he held until December 1955, when he was made Minister of Transport and Civil Aviation by Sir Anthony Eden, entering the cabinet in January 1957, and remaining there when promoted to Minister of Defence under Harold Macmillan in 1959. Watkinson was one of seven cabinet ministers sacked in July 1962 in Macmillan's Night of the Long Knives. He was appointed a Privy Counsellor in 1955, a Member of the Order of the Companions of Honour in 1962, and raised to the peerage as Viscount Watkinson, of Woking in the County of Surrey, in 1964.

== Business career ==
Lord Watkinson held a number of public and business appointments, including senior positions in the British Institute of Management; President of the Confederation of British Industry between 1976 and 1977; and Chairman of Cadbury Schweppes Ltd between 1969 and 1974.

== Personal life ==
Watkinson had been an active rock climber in his younger days. He married Vera (Peggy) Langmead in 1939 and they had two daughters. Lord Watkinson died in December 1995, aged 85, and the viscountcy became extinct.

== Arms ==
Coat of arms of Harold Watkinson
Crest A ram passant Proper on an antique cannon Sable garnished Or. Escutcheon Vert fretty and three fleeces Or. Supporters Dexter a weaver holding in the exterior hand a shuttle, sinister a shepherd with the exterior hand a crook, all Proper. Motto Laborare Est Orare

Parliament of the United Kingdom
New constituency	Member of Parliament for Woking; 1950–1964	Succeeded by Cranley Onslow
Political offices
Preceded by Sir Peter Bennett	Parliamentary Secretary to the Ministry of Labour and National Service; 1952–1955	Succeeded by Robert Carr
Preceded by John Boyd-Carpenter	Minister of Transport and Civil Aviation; 1955–1959	Succeeded by Ernest Marples as Minister of Transport
Preceded by Duncan Sandys	Minister of Defence; 1959–1962	Succeeded by Peter Thorneycroft
Peerage of the United Kingdom
New creation	Viscount Watkinson; 1964–1995	Extinct
