= National Government (1937–1939) =

UK government, 1937–1939

- 4th National Government of the United Kingdom
- 1937–1939
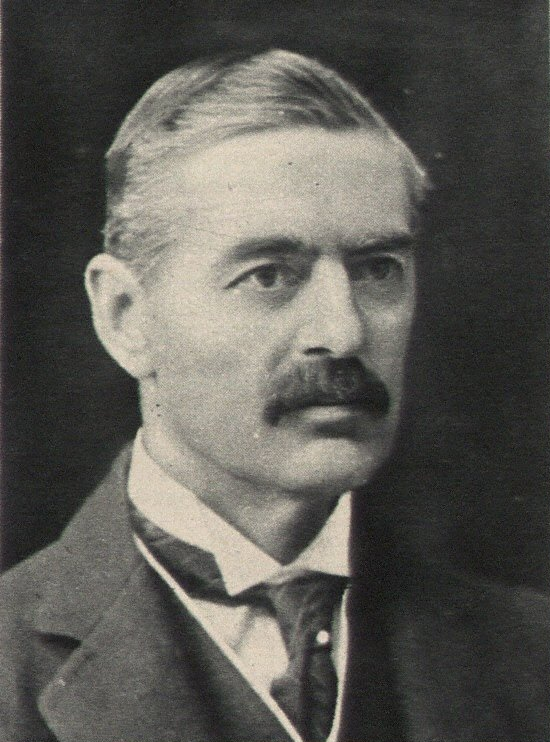
- Neville Chamberlain
- Date formed: 28 May 1937
- Date dissolved: 3 September 1939

People and organisations
- Monarch: George VI
- Prime Minister: Neville Chamberlain
- Prime Minister's history: 1937–1940
- Total no. of members: 119 appointments
- Member parties: Conservative Party; Liberal National Party; National Labour
- Status in legislature: Majority (coalition)
- Opposition party: Labour Party
- Opposition leaders: Clement Attlee (Note: The Leader of the Opposition in the House of Commons was given statutory recognition in the Ministers of the Crown Act 1937 as the primary opposition leader.) in the House of Commons; Lord Snell in the House of Lords

History
- Legislature terms: 37th UK Parliament
- Predecessor: Third National Government
- Successor: Chamberlain war ministry

The National Government of 1937–1939 was formed by Neville Chamberlain on his appointment as Prime Minister of the United Kingdom by King George VI. He succeeded Stanley Baldwin, who announced his resignation following the coronation of the King and Queen in May 1937.

As a National Government it contained members of the Conservative Party, Liberal Nationals and National Labour, as well as a number of individuals who belonged to no political party. In September 1939, Chamberlain requested the formal resignations of all his colleagues, reconstructing the government in order to better confront Nazi Germany in the Second World War.

== Policies ==
=== Foreign policy ===
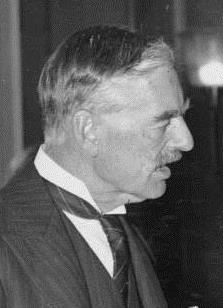
Neville Chamberlain was the serving prime minister

Chamberlain is best known for his appeasement policy, and in particular for his signing of the Munich Agreement in 1938, conceding the Sudetenland region of Czechoslovakia to the Nazi regime. He said it brought "Peace for our time" and was widely applauded. He also stepped up Britain's rearmament program, and worked closely with France. When in 1939 Hitler continued his aggression, taking over the rest of Czechoslovakia on 15 March 1939 and threatening Poland, Chamberlain pledged to defend Poland's independence if the latter were attacked. Britain and France declared war two days after the Nazi regime had begun to invade Poland on 1 September 1939.

=== Domestic policies ===
Chamberlain wanted to focus on domestic issues. He obtained passage of the Factories Act 1937, designed to better working conditions in factories, and placed limits on the working hours of women and children. The Coal Act 1938 allowed for nationalisation of coal deposits. Another major piece of legislation passed that year was the Holidays with Pay Act 1938. The Housing Act 1938 provided subsidies aimed at encouraging slum clearance, and maintained rent control. Chamberlain's plans for the reform of local government were shelved because of the outbreak of war in 1939. Likewise, the proposal to raise the school-leaving age to 15, scheduled for implementation on 1 September 1939, could not go into effect.

== Cabinet ==
=== May 1937 – September 1939 ===
- Neville Chamberlain – Prime Minister and Leader of the House of Commons
- Douglas Hogg, 1st Viscount Hailsham – Lord High Chancellor of Great Britain
- The Viscount Halifax – Leader of the House of Lords and Lord President of the Council
- Herbrand Sackville, 9th Earl De La Warr – Lord Keeper of the Privy Seal
- Sir John Simon – Chancellor of the Exchequer
- Sir Samuel Hoare, 2nd Baronet – Secretary of State for the Home Department
- Anthony Eden – Secretary of State for Foreign Affairs
- William Ormsby-Gore – Secretary of State for the Colonies
- Malcolm MacDonald – Secretary of State for Dominion Affairs
- Leslie Hore-Belisha – Secretary of State for War
- Lawrence Dundas, 2nd Marquess of Zetland – Secretary of State for India and Burma
- Philip Cunliffe-Lister, 1st Viscount Swinton – Secretary of State for Air
- Walter Elliot – Secretary of State for Scotland
- Duff Cooper – First Lord of the Admiralty
- Oliver Stanley – President of the Board of Trade
- James Stanhope, 7th Earl Stanhope – President of the Board of Education
- William Shepherd Morrison – Minister of Agriculture
- Ernest Brown – Minister of Labour
- Sir Kingsley Wood – Minister of Health
- Leslie Burgin – Minister of Transport
- Sir Thomas Inskip – Minister for Coordination of Defence

For a full list of ministerial office-holders, see National Government 1935-1940.

==== Key office-holders not in the Cabinet ====
- Edward Turnour, 6th Earl Winterton – Chancellor of the Duchy of Lancaster
- Robert Hutchison, 1st Baron Hutchison of Montrose – Paymaster General
- Herwald Ramsbotham – Minister of Pensions
- George Tryon – Postmaster General
- Sir Philip Sassoon – First Commissioner of Works
- Sir Donald Somervell – Attorney General
- Sir Terence O'Connor – Solicitor General
- David Margesson – Chief Whip
- Osmund Somers Cleverly – Principal Private Secretary to the Prime Minister

==== Changes ====
- February 1938 – Lord Halifax succeeds Eden (resigned) as Foreign Secretary. Halifax is succeeded as Lord President by Lord Hailsham, who is succeeded as Lord Chancellor by Lord Maugham. Halifax is succeeded as Leader of the House of Lords by Lord Stanhope, who remains President of the Board of Education as well.
- March 1938 – Lord Winterton, the Chancellor of the Duchy of Lancaster, enters the Cabinet.
- May 1938 – Ormsby-Gore inherits the title Baron Harlech. He subsequently steps down from the government and is succeeded by Malcolm MacDonald as Colonial Secretary. Lord Stanley succeeds MacDonald as Dominions Secretary. Kingsley Wood succeeds Lord Swinton as Secretary of State for Air. Walter Elliot succeeds Wood as Minister of Health. John Colville succeeds Elliot as Scottish Secretary.
- June 1938 – The Earl of Munster succeeds Lord Hutchison as Paymaster-General.
- October 1938 – Lord Stanhope succeeds Duff Cooper (resigned) as First Lord of the Admiralty, remaining also Leader of the House of Lords. Lord De La Warr succeeds Stanhope at the Board of Education. Sir John Anderson succeeds De La Warr as Lord Privy Seal, with special responsibility for Air Raid Precautions. Malcolm MacDonald succeeds Stanley (deceased) as Dominions Secretary, remaining also Colonial Secretary. Lord Runciman succeeds Lord Hailsham as Lord President.
- January 1939 – Sir Thomas Inskip succeeds Malcolm MacDonald as Dominions Secretary. MacDonald remains Colonial Secretary. Lord Chatfield succeeds Inskip as Minister for Coordination of Defence. William Morrison succeeds Lord Winterton at the Duchy of Lancaster, who becomes Paymaster General outside the Cabinet. Sir Reginald Dorman-Smith succeeds Morrison as Minister of Agriculture. Lord Winterton leaves the Cabinet and the post of Chancellor of the Duchy of Lancaster, becoming Paymaster-General in succession to the Earl of Munster.
- April 1939 – Leslie Burgin becomes Minister without Portfolio pending the legislation to create the Ministry of Supply. He is succeeded as Minister of Transport by Euan Wallace.
- June 1939 – Herwald Ramsbotham succeeds Sir Philip Sassoon (deceased) as First Commissioner of Works and is succeeded as Minister of Pensions by Sir Walter Womersley.
- July 1939 – Leslie Burgin becomes Minister of Supply.

== List of ministers ==
Members of the Cabinet are in bold face.

Office	Name	Party	Dates	Notes
Prime Minister, First Lord of the Treasury and Leader of the House of Commons	**Neville Chamberlain**	Conservative	28 May 1937 – 3 September 1939	
Lord High Chancellor of Great Britain	**Douglas Hogg, 1st Viscount Hailsham**	Conservative	May 1937	
Lord High Chancellor of Great Britain	**Frederic Maugham, 1st Baron Maugham**		9 March 1938	
Lord President of the Council	**Edward Wood, 1st Viscount Halifax**	Conservative	28 May 1937	also Leader of the House of Lords
Lord President of the Council	**Douglas Hogg, 1st Viscount Hailsham**	Conservative	9 March 1938	
Lord President of the Council	**Walter Runciman, 1st Viscount Runciman of Doxford**	Liberal National	31 October 1938	
Lord Keeper of the Privy Seal	**Herbrand Sackville, 9th Earl De La Warr**	National Labour	28 May 1937	
Lord Keeper of the Privy Seal	**Sir John Anderson**	National	31 October 1938	
Chancellor of the Exchequer	**Sir John Simon**	Liberal National	28 May 1937	
Parliamentary Secretary to the Treasury	David Margesson	Conservative	May 1937	
Financial Secretary to the Treasury	John Colville	Conservative	May 1937	
Financial Secretary to the Treasury	Euan Wallace	Conservative	16 May 1938	
Financial Secretary to the Treasury	Harry Crookshank	Conservative	21 April 1939	
Lords of the Treasury	James Stuart	Conservative	May 1937 – September 1939	
Lords of the Treasury	Charles Kerr	Liberal National	28 May 1937 – 4 April 1939	
Lords of the Treasury	Thomas Dugdale	Conservative	28 May 1937 – September 1939	
Lords of the Treasury	Charles Waterhouse	Conservative	28 May 1937 – 18 October 1937	
Lords of the Treasury	Ronald Cross	Conservative	28 May 1937 – 18 October 1937	
Lords of the Treasury	Patrick Munro	Conservative	18 October 1937 – September 1939	
Lords of the Treasury	Robert Grimston	Conservative	18 October 1937 – 18 May 1938	
Lords of the Treasury	Stephen Furness	Liberal National	20 May 1938 – September 1939	
Lords of the Treasury	Sir James Edmondson	Conservative	4 April 1939 – September 1939	
Secretary of State for Foreign Affairs	**Anthony Eden**	Conservative	May 1937	
Secretary of State for Foreign Affairs	**Edward Wood, 1st Viscount Halifax**	Conservative	21 February 1938	
Parliamentary Under-Secretary of State for Foreign Affairs	Robert Gascoyne-Cecil, Viscount Cranborne	Conservative	May 1937 – 20 February 1938	
Parliamentary Under-Secretary of State for Foreign Affairs	Ivor Miles Windsor-Clive, 2nd Earl of Plymouth	Conservative	May 1937 – 12 May 1939	
Parliamentary Under-Secretary of State for Foreign Affairs	Rab Butler		25 February 1938 – September 1939	
Secretary of State for the Home Department	**Sir Samuel Hoare, 2nd Baronet**	Conservative	28 May 1937	
Under-Secretary of State for the Home Department	Geoffrey Lloyd	Conservative	May 1937	
Under-Secretary of State for the Home Department	Osbert Peake	Conservative	29 June 1939 (?)	
First Lord of the Admiralty	**Duff Cooper**	Conservative	28 May 1937	
First Lord of the Admiralty	**James Stanhope, 7th Earl Stanhope**	Conservative	27 October 1938	also Leader of the House of Lords
Parliamentary and Financial Secretary to the Admiralty	Geoffrey Shakespeare	Liberal National	28 May 1937	
Civil Lord of the Admiralty	John Llewellin		28 May 1937	
Civil Lord of the Admiralty	Sir Austin Hudson, 1st Baronet	Conservative	14 July 1939	
Minister of Agriculture and Fisheries	**William Morrison**	Conservative	May 1937	
Minister of Agriculture and Fisheries	**Sir Reginald Dorman-Smith**		29 January 1939	
Parliamentary Secretary to the Ministry of Agriculture and Fisheries	Charles Duncombe, 3rd Earl of Feversham	Conservative	May 1937	also Deputy Minister of Fisheries
Secretary of State for Air	**Philip Cunliffe-Lister, 1st Viscount Swinton**	Conservative	May 1937	
Secretary of State for Air	**Sir Kingsley Wood**	Conservative	16 May 1938	
Under-Secretary of State for Air	Anthony Muirhead	Conservative	28 May 1937	
Under-Secretary of State for Air	Harold Balfour	Conservative	16 May 1938	
Secretary of State for the Colonies	**William Ormsby-Gore**	Conservative	May 1937	
Secretary of State for the Colonies	**Malcolm MacDonald**	National Labour	16 May 1938	
Under-Secretary of State for the Colonies	Basil Hamilton-Temple-Blackwood, 4th Marquess of Dufferin and Ava		28 May 1937	
Minister for Coordination of Defence	**Sir Thomas Inskip**	Conservative	May 1937	
Minister for Coordination of Defence	**Ernle Chatfield, 1st Baron Chatfield**		29 January 1939	
Secretary of State for Dominion Affairs	**Malcolm MacDonald**	National Labour	May 1937	
Secretary of State for Dominion Affairs	**Edward Stanley, Baron Stanley**	Conservative	16 May 1938	
Secretary of State for Dominion Affairs	**Malcolm MacDonald**	National Labour	31 October 1938	
Secretary of State for Dominion Affairs	**Sir Thomas Inskip**	Conservative	29 January 1939	Viscount Caldecote
Under-Secretary of State for Dominion Affairs	Edward Cavendish, Marquess of Hartington	Conservative	May 1937	succeeded as Duke of Devonshire 6 May 1938
President of the Board of Education	**James Stanhope, 7th Earl Stanhope**	Conservative	28 May 1937	also Leader of the House of Lords from 21 February 1938
President of the Board of Education	**Herbrand Sackville, 9th Earl De La Warr**	National Labour	27 October 1938	
Parliamentary Secretary to the Board of Education	Kenneth Lindsay	National Labour	28 May 1937	
Minister of Health	**Sir Kingsley Wood**	Conservative	May 1937	
Minister of Health	**Walter Elliot**		16 May 1938	
Parliamentary Secretary to the Ministry of Health	Robert Bernays	Liberal National	28 May 1937	
Parliamentary Secretary to the Ministry of Health	Florence Horsbrugh	Conservative	14 July 1939	
Secretary of State for India and Burma	**Lawrence Dundas, 2nd Marquess of Zetland**	Conservative	May 1937	
Under-Secretary of State for India	Edward Stanley, Baron Stanley	Conservative	28 May 1937	
Under-Secretary of State for India	Anthony Muirhead	Conservative	16 May 1938	
Minister of Labour	**Ernest Brown**	Liberal National	May 1937	
Parliamentary Secretary to the Ministry of Labour	Rab Butler	Conservative	28 May 1937	
Parliamentary Secretary to the Ministry of Labour	Alan Lennox-Boyd	Conservative	25 February 1938	
Chancellor of the Duchy of Lancaster	Edward Turnour, 6th Earl Winterton	Conservative	28 May 1937	Office in Cabinet from 11 March 1938
Chancellor of the Duchy of Lancaster	**William Morrison**	Conservative	29 January 1939	
Paymaster General	Robert Hutchison, 1st Baron Hutchison of Montrose	Liberal National	May 1937	
Paymaster General	Geoffrey FitzClarence, 5th Earl of Munster	Conservative	2 June 1938	
Paymaster General	Edward Turnour, 6th Earl Winterton	Conservative	29 January 1939	
Minister for Pensions	Herwald Ramsbotham	Conservative	May 1937	
Minister for Pensions	Sir Walter Womersley	Conservative	7 June 1939	
Minister without Portfolio	**Leslie Burgin**	Liberal National	21 April 1939 – 14 July 1939	
Postmaster-General	George Tryon	Conservative	May 1937	
Assistant Postmaster-General	Sir Walter Womersley	Conservative	May 1937	
Assistant Postmaster-General	William Mabane	Liberal	7 June 1939	
Secretary of State for Scotland	**Walter Elliot**		May 1937	
Secretary of State for Scotland	**John Colville**		16 May 1938	
Under-Secretary of State for Scotland	Henry Wedderburn	Conservative	May 1937	
Minister of Supply	**Leslie Burgin**	Liberal National	14 July 1939	
Parliamentary Secretary to the Ministry of Supply	John Llewellin		14 July 1939	
President of the Board of Trade	**Oliver Stanley**		28 May 1937	
Parliamentary Secretary to the Board of Trade	Euan Wallace	Conservative	28 May 1937	
Parliamentary Secretary to the Board of Trade	Ronald Cross	Conservative	16 May 1938	
Secretary for Overseas Trade	Robert Hudson	Conservative	28 May 1937	
Secretary for Mines	Harry Crookshank	Conservative	May 1937	
Secretary for Mines	Geoffrey Lloyd	Conservative	21 April 1939	
Minister of Transport	**Leslie Burgin**	Liberal National	28 May 1937	
Minister of Transport	**Euan Wallace**	Conservative	21 April 1939	
Parliamentary Secretary to the Ministry of Transport	Sir Austin Hudson, 1st Baronet	Conservative	May 1937	
Parliamentary Secretary to the Ministry of Transport	Robert Bernays	Liberal National	14 July 1939	
Secretary of State for War	**Leslie Hore-Belisha**	Liberal National	28 May 1937	
Under-Secretary of State for War	Donald Howard, 3rd Baron Strathcona and Mount Royal	Conservative	May 1937	
Under-Secretary of State for War	Geoffrey FitzClarence, 5th Earl of Munster	Conservative	29 January 1939	
Financial Secretary to the War Office	Sir Victor Warrender, 8th Baronet	Conservative	May 1937	
First Commissioner of Works	Sir Philip Sassoon, 3rd Baronet	Conservative	28 May 1937	
First Commissioner of Works	Herwald Ramsbotham	Conservative	7 June 1939	
Attorney General	Sir Donald Somervell	Conservative	May 1937	
Solicitor General	Sir Terence O'Connor	Conservative	May 1937	
Lord Advocate	Thomas Cooper		May 1937	
Solicitor General for Scotland	James Reid		May 1937	
Treasurer of the Household	Sir Lambert Ward	Conservative	28 May 1937	
Treasurer of the Household	Arthur Hope	Conservative	18 October 1937	
Treasurer of the Household	Charles Waterhouse	Conservative	4 April 1939	
Sir Comptroller of the Household	George Davies		28 May 1937	
Sir Comptroller of the Household	Charles Waterhouse	Conservative	18 October 1937	
Sir Comptroller of the Household	Charles Kerr	Liberal National	4 April 1939	
Vice-Chamberlain of the Household	Arthur Hope	Conservative	28 May 1937	
Vice-Chamberlain of the Household	Ronald Cross	Conservative	18 October 1937	
Vice-Chamberlain of the Household	Robert Grimston	Conservative	4 April 1939	
Captain of the Gentlemen-at-Arms	George Bingham, 5th Earl of Lucan		May 1937	
Captain of the Yeomen of the Guard	Arthur Chichester, 4th Baron Templemore		May 1937	
Lords in Waiting	Henry Gage, 6th Viscount Gage		May 1937 – 11 April 1939	
Lords in Waiting	Geoffrey FitzClarence, 5th Earl of Munster	Conservative	May 1937 – 2 June 1938	
Lords in Waiting	John Crichton, 5th Earl Erne		May 1937 – 25 July 1939	
Lords in Waiting	Hugh Fortescue, 5th Earl Fortescue		26 August 1937 – September 1939	
Lords in Waiting	Frederick Smith, 2nd Earl of Birkenhead		12 July 1938 – September 1939	
Lords in Waiting	Rowland Hood, 3rd Viscount Bridport		11 April 1939 – September 1939	
Lords in Waiting	Robert Egerton Grosvenor, 5th Baron Ebury		25 July 1939 – September 1939	

== Bibliography ==
=== Secondary sources ===
- Butler, David, and Butler, G. Twentieth Century British Political Facts 1900–2000
- Cowling, Maurice. The Impact of Hitler: British Politics and British Policy, 1933–1940 (Cambridge University Press, 1975).
- Feiling, Keith. A Life of Neville Chamberlain (London: Macmillan, 1970)
- Macklin, Graham. Chamberlain (Haus Books, 2006)
- Mowat, Charles Loch. Britain between the Wars: 1918–1945 (1955), pp. 413–79
- Raymond, John (1960). Raymond, John (ed.). The Baldwin Age. London: Eyre & Spottiswoode. p. 252. Archived from the original on 10 October 2019 – via Questia.
- Roberts, Andrew. 'The Holy Fox': The Life of Lord Halifax (1997).
- Self, Robert C. Neville Chamberlain: A Biography (2006) excerpt and text search
- Smart, Nick. The National Government. 1931–40 (Macmillan 1999) ISBN 0-333-69131-8
- Taylor, A. J. P. English History 1914–1945 (1965), pp. 321–88
- Thorpe, Andrew. Britain in the 1930s. The Deceptive Decade, (Oxford: Blackwell, 1992). ISBN 0-631-17411-7

=== Primary sources ===
- Chamberlain, Neville. The Neville Chamberlain Diary Letters: The Downing Street Years, 1934–1940 edited by Robert Self (2005)

Preceded by Third National Government	Government of the United Kingdom; 1937–1939	Succeeded by Chamberlain war ministry
