= National Government (1935–1937) =

3rd National Government of the United Kingdom

- 3rd National Government of the United Kingdom
- 1935–1937
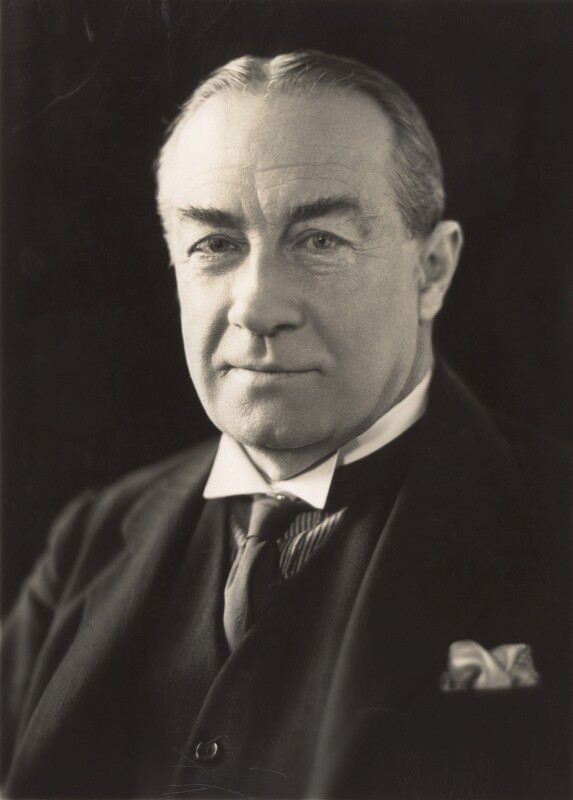
- Stanley Baldwin in 1932
- Date formed: 7 June 1935
- Date dissolved: 28 May 1937

People and organisations
- Monarch: George V (1935–1936); Edward VIII (1936); George VI (1936–1937)
- Prime Minister: Stanley Baldwin
- Total no. of members: 109 appointments
- Member parties: Conservative Party; National Labour; Liberal National Party
- Status in legislature: Majority (coalition)
- Opposition party: Labour Party
- Opposition leaders: George Lansbury (1935); Clement Attlee (1935–1937) in the House of Commons; Lord Ponsonby of Shulbrede (1935); Lord Snell (1935–1937) in the House of Lords

History
- Election: 1935 general election
- Legislature terms: 36th UK Parliament; 37th UK Parliament
- Predecessor: Second National Government
- Successor: Fourth National Government

The National Government of 1935–1937 was formed by Stanley Baldwin on his reappointment as Prime Minister of the United Kingdom by King George V, following the resignation of Ramsay MacDonald in June 1935.

As a National Government it was a coalition of members of the Conservative Party, Liberal Nationals and National Labour, as well as a number of individuals who belonged to no political party. The Government oversaw the Edward VIII abdication crisis and three monarchs in 1936. In May 1937, Baldwin retired and was replaced as prime minister by Neville Chamberlain.

== Cabinet ==
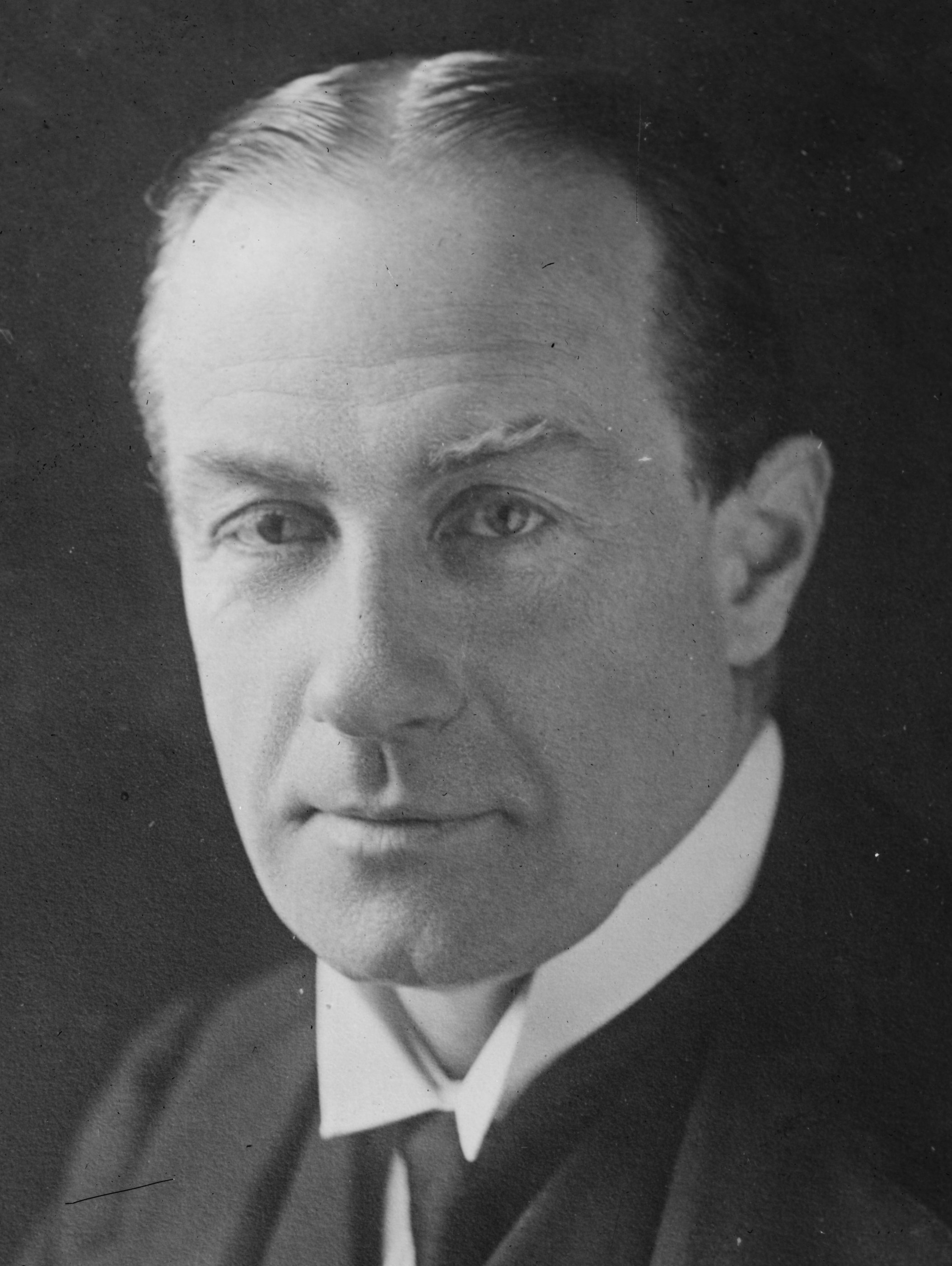
Stanley Baldwin was the serving prime minister

=== 1935–1937 ===
Office	Name	Term
Prime Minister	Stanley Baldwin	1935–1937
Lord President of the Council	Ramsay MacDonald	1935–1937
Lord High Chancellor of Great Britain	Douglas Hogg, 1st Viscount Hailsham	1935–1937
Leader of the House of Lords; Lord Keeper of the Privy Seal	Charles Vane-Tempest-Stewart, 7th Marquess of Londonderry	1935
Leader of the House of Lords; Lord Keeper of the Privy Seal	Edward Wood, 3rd Viscount Halifax	1935–1937
Secretary of State for Foreign Affairs	Sir Samuel Hoare	1935
Secretary of State for Foreign Affairs	Anthony Eden	1935–1937
Secretary of State for the Home Department	Sir John Simon	1935–1937
Secretary of State for the Colonies	Malcolm MacDonald	1935
Secretary of State for the Colonies	James Henry Thomas	1935–1936
Secretary of State for the Colonies	William Ormsby-Gore	1936–1937
Secretary of State for War	Edward Wood, 3rd Viscount Halifax	1935
Secretary of State for War	Duff Cooper	1935–1937
Secretary of State for India	Lawrence Dundas, 2nd Marquess of Zetland	1935–1937
Secretary of State for Air	Philip Cunliffe-Lister, 1st Viscount Swinton	1935–1937
Secretary of State for Dominion Affairs	James Henry Thomas	1935
Secretary of State for Dominion Affairs	Malcolm MacDonald	1935–1937
Secretary of State for Scotland	Sir Godfrey Collins	1935–1936
Secretary of State for Scotland	Walter Elliot	1936–1937
Chancellor of the Exchequer	Neville Chamberlain	1935–1937
Minister without Portfolio	Anthony Eden	1935
Minister without Portfolio	Lord Eustace Percy	1935–1936
First Lord of the Admiralty	Bolton Eyres-Monsell (from November 1935 as Viscount Monsell)	1935–1936
First Lord of the Admiralty	Sir Samuel Hoare	1936–1937
President of the Board of Trade	Walter Runciman	1935–1937
Minister of Health	Sir Kingsley Wood	1935–1937
President of the Board of Education	Oliver Stanley	1935–1937

==== Notes ====
- Anthony Eden served as Minister without Portfolio, with specific responsibility for League of Nations Affairs (and was often referred to as "Minister for League of Nations Affairs) for approximately six months; during this time, he enjoyed equal status with the Foreign Secretary (Sir Samuel Hoare) and sat in the cabinet.

== List of ministers ==
Members of the Cabinet are in bold face.

Office	Name	Party	Dates	Notes
Prime Minister, First Lord of the Treasury and Leader of the House of Commons	**Stanley Baldwin**	Conservative	7 June 1935	
Lord High Chancellor of Great Britain	**Douglas Hogg, 1st Viscount Hailsham**	Conservative	7 June 1935	
Lord President of the Council	**Ramsay MacDonald**	National Labour	7 June 1935	
Leader of the House of Lords; Lord Keeper of the Privy Seal	Charles Vane-Tempest-Stewart, 7th Marquess of Londonderry	Conservative	7 June 1935	
Leader of the House of Lords; Lord Keeper of the Privy Seal	**Edward Wood, 1st Viscount Halifax**	Conservative	22 November 1935	
Chancellor of the Exchequer	**Neville Chamberlain**	Conservative	7 June 1935	
Parliamentary Secretary to the Treasury	David Margesson	Conservative	18 June 1935	
Financial Secretary to the Treasury	Duff Cooper	Conservative	18 June 1935	
Financial Secretary to the Treasury	William Morrison	Conservative	22 November 1935	
Financial Secretary to the Treasury	John Colville	Conservative	29 October 1936	
Lords of the Treasury	James Stuart	Conservative	18 June 1935 – May 1937	
Lords of the Treasury	Archibald Southby	Conservative	18 June 1935 – 28 May 1937	Knighted
Lords of the Treasury	Sir Walter Womersley	Conservative	18 June 1935 – 6 December 1935	
Lords of the Treasury	George Frederick Davies	Conservative	18 June 1935 – 6 December 1935	
Lords of the Treasury	James Blindell	Liberal National	18 June 1935 – 28 May 1937	Knighted
Lords of the Treasury	Arthur Hope	Conservative	6 December 1935 – 28 May 1937	
Lords of the Treasury	Henry Morris-Jones	Liberal National	6 December 1935 – 28 May 1937	
Secretary of State for Foreign Affairs	**Sir Samuel Hoare, 2nd Baronet**	Conservative	7 June 1935	
Secretary of State for Foreign Affairs	**Anthony Eden**	Conservative	22 December 1935	
Parliamentary Under-Secretary of State for Foreign Affairs	James Stanhope, 7th Earl Stanhope	Conservative	18 June 1935 – 16 June 1936	
Parliamentary Under-Secretary of State for Foreign Affairs	Robert Gascoyne-Cecil, Viscount Cranborne	Conservative	6 August 1935 – May 1937	
Parliamentary Under-Secretary of State for Foreign Affairs	Ivor Miles Windsor-Clive, 2nd Earl of Plymouth	Conservative	30 July 1936 – May 1937	
Secretary of State for the Home Department and Deputy Leader of the House of Commons	**Sir John Simon**	Liberal National	7 June 1935	
Under-Secretary of State for the Home Department	Euan Wallace	Conservative	18 June 1935	
Under-Secretary of State for the Home Department	Geoffrey Lloyd	Conservative	28 November 1935	
First Lord of the Admiralty	**Sir Bolton Eyres-Monsell**	Conservative	7 June 1935	
First Lord of the Admiralty	**Sir Samuel Hoare, 2nd Baronet**	Conservative	5 June 1936	
Parliamentary and Financial Secretary to the Admiralty	Sir Victor Warrender, 8th Baronet	Conservative	18 June 1935	
Parliamentary and Financial Secretary to the Admiralty	Lord Stanley	Conservative	28 November 1935	
Civil Lord of the Admiralty	Kenneth Lindsay	National Labour	18 June 1935	
Minister of Agriculture and Fisheries	**Walter Elliot**	Unionist	7 June 1935	
Minister of Agriculture and Fisheries	**William Morrison**	Conservative	29 October 1936	
Parliamentary Secretary to the Ministry of Agriculture and Fisheries	Herbrand Sackville, 9th Earl De La Warr	National Labour	18 June 1935	
Parliamentary Secretary to the Ministry of Agriculture and Fisheries	Herwald Ramsbotham	Conservative	28 November 1935	
Parliamentary Secretary to the Ministry of Agriculture and Fisheries	Charles Duncombe, 3rd Earl of Feversham	Conservative	30 July 1936	also Deputy Minister of Fisheries
Secretary of State for Air	**Philip Cunliffe-Lister, 1st Viscount Swinton**	Conservative	7 June 1935	
Under-Secretary of State for Air	Sir Philip Sassoon, 3rd Baronet	Conservative	18 June 1935	
Secretary of State for the Colonies	**Malcolm MacDonald**	National Labour	7 June 1935	
Secretary of State for the Colonies	**James Henry Thomas**	National Labour	22 November 1935	
Secretary of State for the Colonies	**William Ormsby-Gore**	Conservative	28 May 1936	
Under-Secretary of State for the Colonies	Ivor Windsor-Clive, 2nd Earl of Plymouth	Conservative	18 June 1935	
Under-Secretary of State for the Colonies	Herbrand Sackville, 9th Earl De La Warr	National Labour	30 July 1936	
Minister for Coordination of Defence	**Sir Thomas Inskip**	Conservative	13 March 1936	
Secretary of State for Dominion Affairs	**James Henry Thomas**	National Labour	7 June 1935	
Secretary of State for Dominion Affairs	**Malcolm MacDonald**	National Labour	22 November 1935	
Under-Secretary of State for Dominion Affairs	Edward Stanley, Baron Stanley	Conservative	18 June 1935	
Under-Secretary of State for Dominion Affairs	Douglas Hacking	Conservative	28 November 1935	
Under-Secretary of State for Dominion Affairs	Edward Cavendish, Marquess of Hartington	Conservative	4 March 1936	Duke of Devonshire
President of the Board of Education	**Oliver Stanley**	Conservative	7 June 1935	
Parliamentary Secretary to the Board of Education	Herwald Ramsbotham	Conservative	18 June 1935	
Parliamentary Secretary to the Board of Education	Herbrand Sackville, 9th Earl De La Warr	National Labour	28 November 1935	
Parliamentary Secretary to the Board of Education	Geoffrey Shakespeare	Liberal National	30 July 1936	
Minister of Health	**Sir Kingsley Wood**	Conservative	7 June 1935	
Parliamentary Secretary to the Ministry of Health	Geoffrey Shakespeare	Liberal National	18 June 1935	
Parliamentary Secretary to the Ministry of Health	Robert Hudson	Conservative	30 July 1936	
Secretary of State for India	**Lawrence Dundas, 2nd Marquess of Zetland**	Conservative	7 June 1935	For India and Burma from 1937
Under-Secretary of State for India	R. A. Butler	Conservative	18 June 1935	
Minister of Labour	**Ernest Brown**	Liberal National	7 June 1935	
Parliamentary Secretary to the Minister of Labour	Anthony Muirhead	Conservative	18 June 1935	
Chancellor of the Duchy of Lancaster	Sir J. C. C. Davidson	Conservative	18 June 1935	
Paymaster General	Ernest Lamb, 1st Baron Rochester	National Labour	18 June 1935	
Paymaster General	Robert Hutchison, 1st Baron Hutchison of Montrose	Liberal National	6 December 1935	
Minister for Pensions	Robert Hudson	Conservative	18 June 1935	
Minister for Pensions	Herwald Ramsbotham	Conservative	30 July 1936	
Minister without Portfolio	**Anthony Eden**	Conservative	7 June 1935 – 22 December 1935	"Minister for League of Nations Affairs"
Minister without Portfolio	**Lord Eustace Percy**	Conservative	7 June 1935 – 31 March 1936	
Postmaster-General	George Tryon	Conservative	7 June 1935	
Assistant Postmaster-General	Sir Ernest Bennett	National Labour	18 June 1935	
Assistant Postmaster-General	Sir Walter Womersley	Conservative	6 December 1935	
Secretary of State for Scotland	**Sir Godfrey Collins**	Liberal National	7 June 1935	
Secretary of State for Scotland	**Walter Elliot**	Unionist	29 October 1936	
Under-Secretary of State for Scotland	Noel Skelton	Unionist	18 June 1935	
Under-Secretary of State for Scotland	John Colville	Conservative	28 November 1935	
Under-Secretary of State for Scotland	Henry Wedderburn	Conservative	29 October 1936	
President of the Board of Trade	**Walter Runciman**	Liberal National	7 June 1935	
Parliamentary Secretary to the Board of Trade	Leslie Burgin	Liberal National	18 June 1935	
Secretary for Overseas Trade	John Colville	Conservative	18 June 1935	
Secretary for Overseas Trade	Euan Wallace	Conservative	28 November 1935	
Secretary for Mines	Harry Crookshank	Conservative	18 June 1935	
Minister of Transport	Leslie Hore-Belisha	Liberal National	18 June 1935	In Cabinet from 29 October 1936
Parliamentary Secretary to the Ministry of Transport	Austin Hudson	Conservative	18 June 1935	
Secretary of State for War	**Edward Wood, 1st Viscount Halifax**	Conservative	7 June 1935	
Secretary of State for War	**Duff Cooper**	Conservative	22 November 1935	
Under-Secretary of State for War	Donald Howard, 3rd Baron Strathcona and Mount Royal	Conservative	18 June 1935	
Financial Secretary to the War Office	Douglas Hacking	Conservative	18 June 1935	
Financial Secretary to the War Office	Sir Victor Warrender 8th Baronet	Conservative	28 November 1935	
First Commissioner of Works	**William Ormsby-Gore**	Conservative	7 June 1935	
First Commissioner of Works	**James Stanhope, 7th Earl Stanhope**	Conservative	16 June 1936	
Attorney General	Sir Thomas Inskip	Conservative	18 June 1935	
Attorney General	Sir Donald Somervell	Conservative	18 March 1936	
Solicitor General	Sir Donald Somervell	Conservative	18 June 1935	
Solicitor General	Sir Terence O'Connor	Conservative	19 March 1936	
Lord Advocate	Douglas Jamieson	Unionist	18 June 1935	
Lord Advocate	Thomas Cooper	Unionist	25 October 1935	
Solicitor General for Scotland	Thomas Cooper	Unionist	18 June 1935	
Solicitor General for Scotland	Albert Russell	Unionist	29 November 1935	
Solicitor General for Scotland	James Reid	Unionist	25 June 1936	
Treasurer of the Household	Sir Frederick Penny	Conservative	18 June 1935	
Comptroller of the Household	Sir George Bowyer	Conservative	21 June 1935	
Comptroller of the Household	Sir Lambert Ward	Conservative	6 December 1935	
Vice-Chamberlain of the Household	Sir Lambert Ward	Conservative	18 June 1935	
Vice-Chamberlain of the Household	George Davies	Conservative	6 December 1935	
Captain of the Gentlemen-at-Arms	George Bingham, 5th Earl of Lucan	Conservative	18 June 1935	
Captain of the Yeomen of the Guard	Arthur Chichester, 4th Baron Templemore	Conservative	18 June 1935	
Lords in Waiting	Henry Gage, 6th Viscount Gage	Conservative	18 June 1935 – May 1937	
Lords in Waiting	Geoffrey FitzClarence, 5th Earl of Munster	Conservative	18 June 1935 – May 1937	
Lords in Waiting	Charles Duncombe, 3rd Earl of Feversham	Conservative	18 June 1935 – 30 July 1936	
Lords in Waiting	Basil Hamilton-Temple-Blackwood, 4th Marquess of Dufferin and Ava	Conservative	29 October 1936 – 28 May 1937	
Lords in Waiting	John Crichton, 5th Earl Erne	Conservative	29 October 1936 – May 1937	

Preceded by Second National Government	Government of the United Kingdom; 1935–1937	Succeeded by Fourth National Government
