= National Government (1931–1935) =

Multi-party coalition government formed by Ramsay MacDonald

- 2nd National Government of the United Kingdom
- 1931–1935
- The three leading figures in the Cabinet, pictured here in 1931. From left to right: Stanley Baldwin, Ramsay MacDonald, and Sir Herbert Samuel
- Date formed: 27 October 1931
- Date dissolved: 7 June 1935

People and organisations
- Monarch: George V
- Prime Minister: Ramsay MacDonald
- Prime Minister's history: 1929–1935
- Deputy Prime Minister: Stanley Baldwin (Note: According to Eccleshall & Walker (2002:273) and Stanton (2000:26), Baldwin was the effective deputy prime minister in the Conservative-dominated Cabinet. He served as Lord President of the Council.)
- Total no. of members: 107 appointments
- Member parties: Conservative Party; Liberal Party (1931–1932); National Labour; Liberal National Party
- Status in legislature: Supermajority (coalition)
- Opposition party: Labour Party
- Opposition leaders: Arthur Henderson (1931); George Lansbury (1931–1935) in the House of Commons; Lord Parmoor (1931); Lord Ponsonby (1931–1935) in the House of Lords

History
- Election: 1931 general election
- Legislature terms: 36th UK Parliament
- Predecessor: First National Government
- Successor: Third National Government

The National Government of 1931–1935 was formed by Ramsay MacDonald following his reappointment as Prime Minister of the United Kingdom by King George V after the general election in October 1931.

As a National Government it contained members of the Conservative Party, the Liberal Party, National Labour and the Liberal Nationals, as well as a number of individuals who belonged to no political party. The Liberal Nationals had not held office in MacDonald's previous National Government, though two junior ministers appointed as Liberals had defected to them. Their relationship with the main Liberal Party had been unclear, but following the election the Liberal Nationals officially repudiated the official Liberal Party whip.

During the course of the Ministry, the ministers from the Liberal Party (led by Sir Herbert Samuel) resigned when the government adopted a protectionist policy, which took place when it agreed the Ottawa Accords in 1932. The other Liberal faction in the Ministry, the Liberal Nationals, had accepted the Conservative policy of protectionism before this National Government had been formed, so its ministers continued in office.

In June 1935, MacDonald resigned and was replaced as prime minister by Stanley Baldwin.

== Cabinet ==
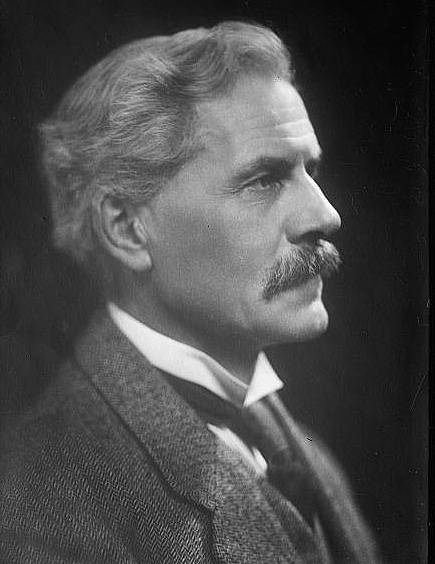
Ramsay MacDonald was the serving prime minister since 1929

=== November 1931 – May 1935 ===
- Ramsay MacDonald – Prime Minister and Leader of the House of Commons
- John Sankey, 1st Viscount Sankey – Lord Chancellor
- Stanley Baldwin – Lord President
- Philip Snowden, 1st Viscount Snowden – Lord Privy Seal
- Neville Chamberlain – Chancellor of the Exchequer
- Sir Herbert Samuel – Home Secretary
- Sir John Simon – Foreign Secretary
- Sir Philip Cunliffe-Lister – Colonial Secretary
- J. H. Thomas – Dominions Secretary
- Douglas Hogg, 1st Viscount Hailsham – Secretary of State for War and Leader of the House of Lords
- Sir Samuel Hoare – Secretary of State for India
- Charles Vane-Tempest-Stewart, 7th Marquess of Londonderry – Secretary for Air
- Sir Archibald Sinclair – Secretary of State for Scotland
- Sir Bolton Eyres-Monsell – First Lord of the Admiralty
- Walter Runciman – President of the Board of Trade
- Sir John Gilmour – Minister of Agriculture
- Sir Donald Maclean – President of the Board of Education
- Henry Betterton – Minister of Labour
- Hilton Young – Minister of Health
- William Ormsby-Gore – First Commissioner of Works

==== Changes ====
- June 1932 – Lord Irwin succeeds Donald Maclean (deceased) as President of the Board of Education
- September 1932 – Stanley Baldwin succeeds Philip Snowden as Lord Privy Seal, remaining also Lord President. John Gilmour succeeds Herbert Samuel as Home Secretary. Sir Godfrey Collins succeeds Sir Archibald Sinclair as Scottish Secretary. Walter Elliot succeeds Gilmour as Minister of Agriculture.
- December 1933 – Stanley Baldwin ceases to be Lord Privy Seal, and his successor in that office is not in the cabinet. He continues as Lord President. Kingsley Wood enters the cabinet as Postmaster-General
- June 1934 – Oliver Stanley succeeds Henry Betterton as Minister of Labour

==== Key ====
- = Member of National Labour
- = Member of the Conservative Party
- = Member of the Liberal Party
- = Member of the Liberal National Party

== List of ministers ==
Members of the Cabinet are in bold face.

Office	Name	Party	Dates	Notes
Prime Minister, First Lord of the Treasury and Leader of the House of Commons	**Ramsay MacDonald**	National Labour	5 November 1931 – 7 June 1935	
Lord Chancellor	**John Sankey, 1st Baron Sankey**	National Labour	November 1931	created Viscount Sankey 30 January 1932
Lord President of the Council	**Stanley Baldwin**	Conservative	November 1931	
Lord Privy Seal	**Philip Snowden**	National Labour	5 November 1931	created Viscount Snowden 24 November 1931
Lord Privy Seal	**Stanley Baldwin**	Conservative	29 September 1932	
Lord Privy Seal	Anthony Eden	Conservative	31 December 1933	
Chancellor of the Exchequer	**Neville Chamberlain**	Conservative	5 November 1931	
Parliamentary Secretary to the Treasury	David Margesson	Conservative	10 November 1931	
Financial Secretary to the Treasury	Walter Elliot	Conservative	November 1931	
Financial Secretary to the Treasury	Leslie Hore-Belisha	Liberal National	29 September 1932	
Financial Secretary to the Treasury	Duff Cooper	Conservative	29 June 1934	
Lords of the Treasury	Walter Womersley	Conservative	12 November 1931 – 7 June 1935	knighted 1934
Lords of the Treasury	Victor Warrender	Conservative	12 November 1931 – 30 September 1932	
Lords of the Treasury	Geoffrey Shakespeare	Liberal National	12 November 1931 – 30 September 1932	
Lords of the Treasury	Austin Hudson	Conservative	12 November 1931 – 12 April 1935	
Lords of the Treasury	Lambert Ward	Conservative	12 November 1931 – 1 May 1935	
Lords of the Treasury	George Davies	Conservative	11 October 1932 – 7 June 1935	
Lords of the Treasury	James Blindell	Liberal National	30 September 1932 – 7 June 1935	
Lords of the Treasury	James Stuart	Conservative	1 May 1935 – 7 June 1935	
Lords of the Treasury	Archibald Southby	Conservative	23 April 1935 – 7 June 1935	
Secretary of State for Foreign Affairs	**Rufus Isaacs, 1st Marquess of Reading**	Liberal	24 August 1931 – 5 November 1931	
Secretary of State for Foreign Affairs	John Simon	Liberal National	5 November 1931	
Parliamentary Under-Secretary of State for Foreign Affairs	Anthony Eden	Conservative	November 1931	
Parliamentary Under-Secretary of State for Foreign Affairs	James Stanhope	Conservative	18 January 1934	
Secretary of State for the Home Department	**Herbert Samuel**	Liberal	November 1931	
Secretary of State for the Home Department	**John Gilmour**	Conservative	28 September 1932	
Under-Secretary of State for the Home Department	Oliver Stanley	Conservative	November 1931	
Under-Secretary of State for the Home Department	Douglas Hacking	Conservative	22 February 1933	
Under-Secretary of State for the Home Department	Harry Crookshank	Conservative	29 June 1934	
First Lord of the Admiralty	**Bolton Eyres-Monsell**	Conservative	5 November 1931	
Parliamentary and Financial Secretary to the Admiralty	Edward Stanley	Conservative	10 November 1931	
Civil Lord of the Admiralty	Euan Wallace	Conservative	10 November 1931	
Minister of Agriculture and Fisheries	**John Gilmour**	Conservative	November 1931	
Minister of Agriculture and Fisheries	**Walter Elliot**	Conservative	28 September 1932	
Parliamentary Secretary to the Ministry of Agriculture and Fisheries	Herbrand Sackville, 9th Earl De La Warr	National Labour	10 November 1931	
Secretary of State for Air	**Charles Vane-Tempest-Stewart, 7th Marquess of Londonderry**	Conservative	5 November 1931	
Under-Secretary of State for Air	Philip Sassoon	Conservative	November 1931	
Secretary of State for the Colonies	**Philip Cunliffe-Lister**	Conservative	5 November 1931	
Under-Secretary of State for the Colonies	Robert William Hamilton	Liberal	November 1931	
Under-Secretary of State for the Colonies	Ivor Windsor-Clive, 2nd Earl of Plymouth	Conservative	29 September 1932	
Secretary of State for Dominion Affairs	**Jimmy Thomas**	National Labour	November 1931	
Under-Secretary of State for Dominion Affairs	Malcolm MacDonald	National Labour	November 1931	
President of the Board of Education	**Donald Maclean**	Liberal	November 1931	
President of the Board of Education	**Edward Wood, 1st Baron Irwin**	Conservative	15 June 1932	succeeded as 3rd Viscount Halifax 19 January 1934
Parliamentary Secretary to the Board of Education	Herwald Ramsbotham	Conservative	10 November 1931	
Minister of Health	**Hilton Young**	Conservative	5 November 1931	
Parliamentary Secretary to the Ministry of Health	Ernest Brown	Liberal National	10 November 1931	
Parliamentary Secretary to the Ministry of Health	Geoffrey Shakespeare	Liberal National	30 September 1932	
Secretary of State for India	**Samuel Hoare**	Conservative	November 1931	
Under-Secretary of State for India	Philip Kerr, 11th Marquess of Lothian	Liberal	10 November 1931	
Under-Secretary of State for India	Rab Butler	Conservative	29 September 1932	
Minister of Labour	**Henry Betterton**	Conservative	November 1931	
Minister of Labour	**Oliver Stanley**	Conservative	29 June 1934	
Parliamentary Secretary to the Ministry of Labour	Robert Hudson	Conservative	10 November 1931	
Chancellor of the Duchy of Lancaster	J. C. C. Davidson	Conservative	10 November 1931	
Paymaster General	Ernest Lamb, 1st Baron Rochester	National Labour	23 November 1931	
Minister for Pensions	George Tryon	Conservative	November 1931	
Parliamentary Secretary to the Ministry of Pensions	Cuthbert Headlam	Conservative	10 November 1931	Office vacant from 29 September 1932
Postmaster-General	Kingsley Wood	Conservative	10 November 1931	Office in Cabinet from 20 December 1933
Assistant Postmaster-General	Graham White	Liberal	November 1931	
Assistant Postmaster-General	Ernest Nathaniel Bennett	National Labour	21 October 1932	
Secretary of State for Scotland	**Archie Sinclair**	Liberal	November 1931	
Secretary of State for Scotland	**Godfrey Collins**	Liberal National	28 September 1932	
Under-Secretary of State for Scotland	Noel Skelton	Conservative	November 1931	
President of the Board of Trade	**Walter Runciman**	Liberal National	5 November 1931	
Parliamentary Secretary to the Board of Trade	Leslie Hore-Belisha	Liberal National	10 November 1931	
Parliamentary Secretary to the Board of Trade	Leslie Burgin	Liberal National	29 September 1932	
Secretary for Overseas Trade	John Colville	Conservative	10 November 1931	
Secretary for Mines	Isaac Foot	Liberal	November 1931	
Secretary for Mines	Ernest Brown	Liberal National	30 September 1932	
Minister of Transport	James Pybus	Liberal National	November 1931	
Minister of Transport	Oliver Stanley	Conservative	22 February 1933	
Minister of Transport	Leslie Hore-Belisha	Liberal National	29 June 1934	
Parliamentary Secretary to the Ministry of Transport	Ivor Windsor-Clive, 2nd Earl of Plymouth	Conservative	25 November 1931	
Parliamentary Secretary to the Ministry of Transport	Cuthbert Headlam	Conservative	29 September 1932	Office vacant 5 July 1934
Secretary of State for War and Leader of the House of Lords	**Douglas Hogg, 1st Viscount Hailsham**	Conservative	5 November 1931	
Under-Secretary of State for War	James Stanhope, 7th Earl Stanhope	Conservative	10 November 1931	
Under-Secretary of State for War	Donald Howard, 3rd Baron Strathcona and Mount Royal	Conservative	24 January 1934	
Financial Secretary to the War Office	Duff Cooper	Conservative	November 1931	
Financial Secretary to the War Office	Douglas Hacking	Conservative	29 June 1934	
First Commissioner of Works	**William Ormsby-Gore**	Conservative	5 November 1931	
Attorney General	William Jowitt	National Labour	November 1931	
Attorney General	Thomas Inskip	Conservative	26 January 1932	
Solicitor General	Thomas Inskip	Conservative	November 1931	
Solicitor General	Boyd Merriman	Conservative	26 January 1932	
Solicitor General	Donald Somervell	Conservative	29 September 1933	
Lord Advocate	Craigie Aitchison	National Labour	November 1931	
Lord Advocate	Wilfrid Normand	Conservative	2 October 1933	
Lord Advocate	Douglas Jamieson	Conservative	28 March 1935	
Solicitor General for Scotland	Wilfrid Normand	Conservative	10 November 1931	
Solicitor General for Scotland	Douglas Jamieson	Conservative	2 October 1933	
Solicitor General for Scotland	Thomas Cooper	Conservative	15 May 1935	
Treasurer of the Household	Frederick Thomson	Conservative	12 November 1931	
Treasurer of the Household	George Penny	Conservative	1 May 1935	
Comptroller of the Household	Walter Rea	Liberal	12 November 1931	
Comptroller of the Household	George Penny	Conservative	30 September 1932	
Comptroller of the Household	Victor Warrender	Conservative	1 May 1935	
Vice-Chamberlain of the Household	George Penny	Conservative	12 November 1931	
Vice-Chamberlain of the Household	Victor Warrender	Conservative	30 September 1932	
Vice-Chamberlain of the Household	Lambert Ward	Conservative	1 May 1935	
Captain of the Gentlemen-at-Arms	George Bingham, 5th Earl of Lucan	Conservative	12 November 1931	
Captain of the Yeomen of the Guard	Donald Howard, 3rd Baron Strathcona and Mount Royal	Conservative	12 November 1931	
Lords in Waiting	Arthur Chichester, 4th Baron Templemore	Conservative	12 November 1931 – 24 January 1934	
Lords in Waiting	Henry Gage, 6th Viscount Gage	Conservative	12 November 1931 – 7 June 1935	
Lords in Waiting	Wentworth Beaumont, 2nd Viscount Allendale	Liberal	12 November 1931 – 28 September 1932	
Lords in Waiting	Geoffrey FitzClarence, 5th Earl of Munster	Conservative	24 January 1934 – 7 June 1935	
Lords in Waiting	Charles Duncombe, 3rd Earl of Feversham	Conservative	24 January 1934 – 7 June 1935	

== Notes ==
Preceded by First National Government	Government of the United Kingdom; 1931–1935	Succeeded by Third National Government
