= Baldwin ministry =

Baldwin ministry may refer to:

- First Baldwin ministry, the British majority (later caretaker) government led by Stanley Baldwin from 1923 to 1924
- Second Baldwin ministry, the British majority (later caretaker) government led by Stanley Baldwin from 1924 to 1929
- Third Baldwin ministry, the British coalition government led by Stanley Baldwin from June to November 1935
- Fourth Baldwin ministry, the British coalition government led by Stanley Baldwin from November 1935 to 1937

== See also ==
- National Government (United Kingdom)
