= 1916 Hornsey by-election =

UK parliamentary by-election

The 1916 Hornsey by-election was held on 6 December 1916. The by-election was held due to the incumbent Conservative MP, Lawrence Dundas, becoming Governor of Bengal. It was won by the Conservative candidate Kennedy Jones.
