= 1921 Hornsey by-election =

UK Parliamentary by-election

← 1918	10 November 1921	1922 →
Candidate	Ward	Burgin
Party	Unionist	Liberal
Popular vote	15,959	13,943
Percentage	53.4%	46.6%
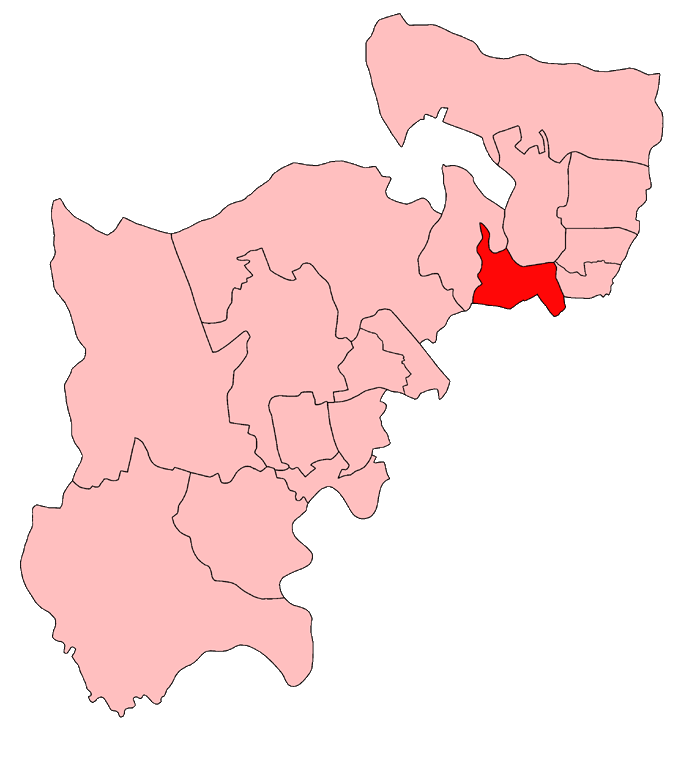
MP before election
Jones
Unionist
Subsequent MP
Ward
Unionist

The 1921 Hornsey by-election was held on 10 November 1921. The by-election was held due to the death of the incumbent Unionist MP, Kennedy Jones. It was won by the Unionist candidate William Ward.

1921 Hornsey by-election
Party	Candidate	Votes	%	±%
Unionist	William Ward	15,959	53.4	N/A
Liberal	Leslie Burgin	13,943	46.6	New
Majority		2,016	6.8	N/A
Turnout		29,902	65.7	N/A
Unionist hold		Swing	N/A	

== Aftermath ==
General election 1922: Hornsey
Party	Candidate	Votes	%	±%
Unionist	William Ward	18,462	53.2	−0.2
Liberal	Leslie Burgin	16,239	46.8	+0.2
Majority		2,223	6.4	−0.4
Turnout		34,701	77.2	+11.5
Unionist hold		Swing	-0.2	
