= Minister of Supply =

British government minister (1939–1959)

The Minister of Supply in the British Government was in charge of the 1939–1959 Ministry of Supply, which was responsible for co-ordinating the supply of equipment to the armed forces. The position was campaigned for by many sceptics of the foreign policy of the National Government in the 1930s before ultimately being created in 1939.

During World War II there was a separate Ministry of Aircraft Production; the first minister Beaverbrook later became Minister of Supply. When W. A. Robotham was Chief Engineer of Tank Design in the Ministry of Supply, he demanded sound manganese steel castings for tank tracks, as a broken track could be a death warrant for the crew. Beaverbrook accused him of holding up production, and took a poor view of Robotham's observation "that they had enough unreliable tanks to last us the rest of the war!". In July 1941, 25% of British tanks were immobilised from mechanical failure, although there was no enemy action in the theatres of war.

The Ministry of Aircraft Production was amalgamated into the Ministry of Supply in July 1945.

In governments shortly after the war, the Ministry became increasingly unpopular with economy-minded Conservatives, who objected to it as a redundant middle-man. This point of view was shared by Reginald Maudling, who served as the Minister under Anthony Eden and refused to continue in office under Harold Macmillan, who had served in a junior role in the Ministry and believed in it, but agreed to wind it up in 1959.

== Minister of Supply 1939–1959 ==
Portrait	Name	Term of office		Political party	Government
	Leslie Burgin; MP for Luton	14 July 1939	12 May 1940	Liberal National	National IV (Cons.–Lab.Nat.–Lib.Nat.)
	Leslie Burgin; MP for Luton	14 July 1939	12 May 1940	Liberal National	Chamberlain War (Cons.–Lab.Nat.–Lib.Nat.)
	Herbert Morrison; MP for Hackney South	12 May 1940	3 October 1940	Labour	Churchill War
	Sir Andrew Rae Duncan; MP for City of London	3 October 1940	29 June 1941	National	Churchill War
	Max Aitken; 1st Baron Beaverbrook	29 June 1941	4 February 1942	Conservative	Churchill War
	Sir Andrew Rae Duncan; MP for City of London	4 February 1942	26 July 1945	National	Churchill War
	Sir Andrew Rae Duncan; MP for City of London	4 February 1942	26 July 1945	National	Churchill Caretaker
	John Wilmot; MP for Deptford	3 August 1945	7 October 1947	Labour	Attlee (I & II)
	George Strauss; MP for Lambeth North before 1950; MP for Vauxhall after 1950	7 October 1947	26 October 1951	Labour	Attlee (I & II)
	Duncan Sandys; MP for Streatham	31 October 1951	18 October 1954	Conservative	Churchill III
	Selwyn Lloyd; MP for The Wirral	18 October 1954	7 April 1955	Conservative	Churchill III
	Reginald Maudling; MP for Barnet	7 April 1955	16 January 1957	Conservative	Eden
	Aubrey Jones; MP for Birmingham Hall Green	16 January 1957	22 October 1959	Conservative	Macmillan I
