= William Ward, 4th Earl of Dudley =

British peer

The Right Honourable The Earl of Dudley
- Born: 5 January 1920
- Died: 16 November 2013 (aged 93)
- Education: Christ Church, Oxford
- Spouse(s): Stella Carcano y Morra (m. 1946; div. 1960) Maureen Swanson (m. 1961)
- Children: 10
- Parents: William Ward, 3rd Earl of Dudley (father); Lady Rosemary Sutherland-Leveson-Gower (mother)
- Relatives: Cromartie Sutherland-Leveson-Gower (grandfather)
- Military career
- Unit: Royal Hussars (Prince of Wales's Own)
- Wars: World War II

William Humble David Ward, 4th Earl of Dudley (5 January 1920 – 16 November 2013), styled Viscount Ednam from 1932 to 1969, was a British peer, a member of the House of Lords from 1969 to 1999.

== Early life ==
Ward was the son of William Ward, 3rd Earl of Dudley, and Lady Rosemary Millicent Sutherland-Leveson-Gower, only surviving daughter of Cromartie Sutherland-Leveson-Gower, 4th Duke of Sutherland. He was a godson of the Duke of Windsor and was brought up at Himley Hall at a time when the family owned 30,000 acres in Staffordshire and Worcestershire. In July 1930, his mother was killed in the Meopham air disaster. His father was a close friend of the Prince of Wales, later King Edward VIII, who spent his last weekend as king at Himley Hall, before his abdication in 1936.

Educated at Eton and Christ Church, Oxford, the future 4th Earl was commissioned into the Royal Hussars (Prince of Wales's Own), and was wounded on active service in the Second World War. Between 1942 and 1943 he served as aide-de-camp to Field Marshal Archibald Wavell the Viceroy of India.

== After the war ==
Dudley ceased to sit as a member of the Lords on 11 November 1999, following the retirement of many of the hereditary seats from the legislature by the House of Lords Act 1999.

He was the paternal uncle of actress and former model Rachel Ward and the environmental activist Tracy Louise Ward (now Duchess of Beaufort) who are the daughters of the 4th Earl's youngest brother, the Hon. Peter Alistair Ward.

== Family ==
Lord Dudley married firstly Stella Carcano y Morra, daughter of Dr. Don Miguel Angel Carcano. Stella was rumored to have had a romantic relationship with John F. Kennedy, who visited her in Aschochinga, province of Córdoba, Argentina. Lord Dudley and Stella Carcano y Morra married on 10 January 1946 and had three children:

- (William Humble) David (Jeremy) Ward, 5th Earl of Dudley (27 March 1947- 7 February 2026). He married Sarah Mary Coats, on 3 July 1972.; they were divorced in 1976. He then married Debra Louise Pinney, in 1976. They had a daughter, Bethany Rowena Ward, in 1977, and were divorced in 1980. He succeeded his father as 5th Earl of Dudley and 15th Baron Ward upon his father's death, at which time he was living in France.
- Lady Rosemary Millicent Ward (born 26 May 1955), twin, married on 26 April 1980 Castor Cañedo. Lady Rosemary has one daughter, and lives in Spain.
- Lady Anne-Marie Ines Ward (born 26 May 1955), twin, married in 1978 Laureano Pérez-Andújar y Gimena. They were divorced in 1993.

Lord and Lady Dudley divorced in 1960.

Lord Dudley remarried in Amersham on 24 August 1961. His second wife was Maureen Swanson the Scottish actress and socialite (25 November 1932 – 16 November 2011). Together they had seven children:

- Hon. William Ward (stillborn 21 October 1961)
- Lady Susanna Louise Ward (born 23 May 1963),
- Lady Melissa Patricia Eileen Ward (born 18 July 1964), married in 1991 to Simon Puxley; has daughter (India Ward Puxley)
- Lady Victoria Larissa Cecilia Ward (born 28 May 1966), Has son (George Ward-Carstairs)
- Lady Amelia Maureen Erica Ward (born 5 September 1967),
- Lady (Emma Sophia) Cressida Ward (born 7 January 1970), married to Dr Ludovic Toro (civil service in July 2011 in London and on 1 October 2011 in Sicily in a Roman Catholic wedding), whom she met while working in Paris and where she now lives. They have a son William Raffaele Vittorio Toro born 26 June 2012; Lady Cressida Ward has a daughter from a prior relationship (Lily Rose Ward Davis; born 2 November 2004). She works in medical PR.
- Leander Grenville Dudley Ward, 6th Earl of Dudley (born 31 October 1971), film-maker, married British journalist Laura Sevier on 23 July 2011. They had a daughter, Leyla Atalanta Ward, on 14 October 2012, a second daughter, Alana Mae Ward, on 8 May 2014, and a third daughter, Emily Alexandra Iona Ward, on 3 August 2020. He succeeded his half-brother as 6th Earl of Dudley and 16th Baron Ward.

== Death ==
The 4th Earl died on 16 November 2013 and was laid to rest in the private burial ground of the Earls of Dudley at the rear of the parish church at Himley.

== Notes ==
Peerage of the United Kingdom
Preceded by William Humble Eric Ward	Earl of Dudley; 1969–2013	Succeeded by William Humble David Jeremy Ward
