= Secretary of State for Employment =

Former position in the Cabinet of the United Kingdom

The secretary of state for employment was a position in the Cabinet of the United Kingdom. In 1995, it was merged with the secretary of state for education to make the secretary of state for education and employment. In 2001, the employment functions were hived off and transferred to the secretary of state for social security to form the secretary of state for work and pensions.

== List of ministers ==
=== Labour (1916–1940) ===
| Name | Term of office | | Political party | Prime Minister |
|---|---|---|---|---|
| John Hodge; MP for Manchester Gorton | 10 December 1916 | 17 August 1917 | Labour | David Lloyd George (Coalition) |
| George Henry Roberts; MP for Norwich | 17 August 1917 | 10 January 1919 | Labour | David Lloyd George (Coalition) |
| Robert Horne; MP for Glasgow Hillhead | 10 January 1919 | 19 March 1920 | Unionist | David Lloyd George (Coalition) |
| Thomas James Macnamara; MP for Camberwell North West | 19 March 1920 | 19 October 1922 | Liberal | David Lloyd George (Coalition) |
| Anderson Montague-Barlow; MP for Salford South | 31 October 1922 | 22 January 1924 | Conservative | Bonar Law |
| Anderson Montague-Barlow; MP for Salford South | 31 October 1922 | 22 January 1924 | Conservative | Stanley Baldwin |
| Tom Shaw; MP for Preston | 22 January 1924 | 3 November 1924 | Labour | Ramsay MacDonald |
| Arthur Steel-Maitland; MP for Birmingham Erdington | 6 November 1924 | 4 June 1929 | Conservative | Stanley Baldwin |
| Margaret Bondfield; MP for Wallsend | 7 June 1929 | 24 August 1931 (lost seat 1931) | Labour | Ramsay MacDonald |
| Henry Betterton; MP for Rushcliffe | 25 August 1931 | 29 June 1934 | Conservative | Ramsay MacDonald (1st & 2nd National Min.) |
| Oliver Stanley; MP for Westmorland | 29 June 1934 | 7 June 1935 | Conservative | Ramsay MacDonald (1st & 2nd National Min.) |
| Ernest Brown; MP for Leith | 7 June 1935 | 13 May 1940 | Liberal National | Stanley Baldwin (3rd National Min.) |
| Ernest Brown; MP for Leith | 7 June 1935 | 13 May 1940 | Liberal National | Neville Chamberlain (4th Nat.Min.; War Coalition) |

=== Labour and national service (1940–1959) ===
| Name | Term of office | | Political party | Prime Minister |
|---|---|---|---|---|
| Ernest Bevin; MP for Wandsworth Central | 13 May 1940 | 23 May 1945 | Labour | Winston Churchill (War Coalition) |
| R. A. Butler; MP for Saffron Walden | 25 May 1945 | 26 July 1945 | Conservative | Winston Churchill (Caretaker Min.) |
| George Isaacs; MP for Southwark North until 1950 then Southwark from 1950 | 3 August 1945 | 17 January 1951 | Labour | Clement Attlee |
| Aneurin Bevan; MP for Ebbw Vale | 17 January 1951 | 23 April 1951 (resigned) | Labour | Clement Attlee |
| Alfred Robens; MP for Blyth Valley | 24 April 1951 | 26 October 1951 | Labour | Clement Attlee |
| Walter Monckton; MP for Bristol West | 28 October 1951 | 20 December 1955 | Conservative | Winston Churchill |
| Walter Monckton; MP for Bristol West | 28 October 1951 | 20 December 1955 | Conservative | Anthony Eden |
| Iain Macleod; MP for Enfield West | 20 December 1955 | 14 October 1959 | Conservative | Anthony Eden |
| Iain Macleod; MP for Enfield West | 20 December 1955 | 14 October 1959 | Conservative | Harold Macmillan |
| Edward Heath; MP for Bexley | 14 October 1959 | 12 November 1959 | Conservative | Harold Macmillan |

=== Labour (1959–1968) ===
| Name | Term of office | | Political party | Prime Minister |
|---|---|---|---|---|
| Edward Heath; MP for Bexley | 12 November 1959 | 7 July 1960 | Conservative | Harold Macmillan |
| John Hare; MP for Sudbury and Woodbridge | 27 July 1960 | 20 October 1963 | Conservative | Harold Macmillan |
| Joseph Godber; MP for Grantham | 20 October 1963 | 16 October 1964 | Conservative | Alec Douglas-Home |
| Ray Gunter; MP for Southwark | 18 October 1964 | 6 April 1968 | Labour | Harold Wilson |

== List of secretaries of state ==
=== Employment and productivity (1968–1970) ===
| Name | Term of office | | Political party | Prime Minister |
|---|---|---|---|---|
| Barbara Castle; MP for Blackburn | 6 April 1968 | 19 June 1970 | Labour | Harold Wilson |

=== Employment (1970–1995) ===
| Name | Term of office | | Political party | Prime Minister |
|---|---|---|---|---|
| Robert Carr; MP for Mitcham | 20 June 1970 | 7 April 1972 | Conservative | Edward Heath |
| Maurice Macmillan; MP for Farnham | 7 April 1972 | 2 December 1973 | Conservative | Edward Heath |
| William Whitelaw; MP for Penrith and The Border | 2 December 1973 | 4 March 1974 | Conservative | Edward Heath |
| Michael Foot; MP for Ebbw Vale | 5 March 1974 | 8 April 1976 | Labour | Harold Wilson |
| Albert Booth; MP for Barrow-in-Furness | 8 April 1976 | 4 May 1979 | Labour | James Callaghan |
| James Prior; MP for Lowestoft | 5 May 1979 | 14 September 1981 | Conservative | Margaret Thatcher |
| Norman Tebbit; MP for Chingford | 14 September 1981 | 16 October 1983 | Conservative | Margaret Thatcher |
| Tom King; MP for Bridgwater | 16 October 1983 | 2 September 1985 | Conservative | Margaret Thatcher |
| David Young, Baron Young of Graffham; Life peer | 2 September 1985 | 13 June 1987 | Conservative | Margaret Thatcher |
| Norman Fowler; MP for Sutton Coldfield | 13 June 1987 | 3 January 1990 | Conservative | Margaret Thatcher |
| Michael Howard; MP for Folkestone and Hythe | 3 January 1990 | 11 April 1992 | Conservative | Margaret Thatcher |
| Michael Howard; MP for Folkestone and Hythe | 3 January 1990 | 11 April 1992 | Conservative | John Major |
| Gillian Shephard; MP for South West Norfolk | 11 April 1992 | 27 May 1993 | Conservative | John Major |
| David Hunt; MP for Wirral West | 27 May 1993 | 20 July 1994 | Conservative | John Major |
| Michael Portillo; MP for Enfield Southgate | 20 July 1994 | 5 July 1995 | Conservative | John Major |

=== Education and employment (1995–2001) ===
| Name | Term of office | | Political party | Prime Minister |
|---|---|---|---|---|
| Gillian Shephard; MP for South West Norfolk | 5 July 1995 | 2 May 1997 | Conservative | John Major |
| David Blunkett; MP for Sheffield Brightside | 2 May 1997 | 8 June 2001 | Labour | Tony Blair |

The office was merged with the Department of Social Security to form the Department for Work and Pensions in 2001.

== See also ==
- Department for Work and Pensions
