= Charles Balfour =

British soldier and politician (1862–1921)

Charles Balfour CB JP DL

Member of Parliament for Hornsey
- In office 1900–1907
- Preceded by: Henry Stephens
- Succeeded by: Lawrence Dundas

Lord Lieutenant of Berwickshire
- In office 1917–1921
- Preceded by: Lord Binning
- Succeeded by: Charles Hope

Personal details
- Born: 20 February 1862
- Died: 31 August 1921 (aged 59)
- Party: Conservative
- Spouse: Lady Helena McDonnell (m. 1888)
- Children: 4, including John
- Relatives: Arthur Balfour (first cousin)

Captain Charles Barrington Balfour CB, JP, DL (20 February 1862 – 31 August 1921) was a British Army officer who became a Conservative Party politician. He sat in the House of Commons from 1900 to 1907.

He was a first cousin of Arthur Balfour, who served as Prime Minister from 1902 to 1905.

== Early life ==
Balfour was the son of Charles Balfour, son of James Balfour, and his wife Adelaide (died 1862), daughter and 8th child of the 6th Viscount Barrington. His father died when he was 10 years old, and Charles succeeded to his estates: Balgonie Castle in Fife and "Newton Don" a country house near Kelso in Roxburghshire.

He was educated at Eton College and then at the Royal Military College, Sandhurst, afterwards being commissioned as a lieutenant in the Scots Guards in 1881. He served in the Anglo-Egyptian War of 1882, and was present at the battle of Tel-El-Kebir, for which received a medal with a clasp. In 1890 he was promoted to captain and joined the 2nd Volunteer Battalion of the King's Own Scottish Borderers from 1891 to 1895, and later served as a captain in the Royal Guards Reserve Regiment. He was appointed to the Reserve on 17 January 1900, and attached to the 25th Regimental district at Berwick-upon-Tweed.

== Later life ==
Balfour was a councillor on Berwickshire County Council, a Justice of the Peace for Berwickshire, and a Deputy Lieutenant of Berwickshire.

He stood for Parliament five times before he won a seat. He was unsuccessful in Roxburghshire at the 1885 general election, in Berwickshire at the 1892 and 1895 general elections, and the Southport by-election in 1899.

At the 1900 general election he was elected unopposed as the Member of Parliament (MP) for the Hornsey division of Middlesex. He was re-elected in 1906, but resigned his seat on 28 May 1907 by becoming Steward of the Manor of Northstead.

Balfour was appointed as Lord Lieutenant of Berwickshire on 31 May 1917. In the King's Birthday Honours in June 1919, he was made a Companion of the Order of the Bath for services in connection with the First World War in his capacity as president and chairman of the Berwickshire Territorial Force Association.

Balfour was also a director of Barclays Bank and of the Scottish Widows fund. He was elected a Fellow of the Royal Botanic Society in November 1902.

He died on 31 August 1921. A memorial to his memory was erected in Kelso in 1925 to a design by Sir Robert Lorimer.

== Family ==
In 1888, Balfour married Lady Helena McDonnell, known as "Nina", daughter of Alexander MacDonnell, 5th Earl of Antrim. They had four sons, the eldest being Charles James Balfour (b.1889), who became a captain in the Scots Guards, and (in 1917) married the Hon. Aurea Vera Baring, daughter of Francis Baring, 5th Baron Ashburton. Another son, John, was imprisoned in Germany at Ruhleben, a racecourse on the outskirts of Berlin, for the duration of the First World War. He had been studying at a university in Germany at the outbreak of the war and was immediately interned there. On repatriation, he joined the Foreign Office and became a career diplomat, and was knighted in 1954. He was posted in Moscow, Madrid, Buenos Aires and Washington, as well as serving in other countries. He died in 1983. His memoir, Not Too Correct an Aureole: the Recollections of a Diplomat, was published posthumously.

Parliament of the United Kingdom
Preceded by Henry Stephens	Member of Parliament for Hornsey; 1900 – 1907	Succeeded by Lawrence Dundas
Honorary titles
Preceded by Lord Binning	Lord Lieutenant of Berwickshire; 1917–1921	Succeeded by Charles Hope
