= William Ward, 3rd Earl of Dudley =

British politician

The Right Honourable The Earl of Dudley MC TD
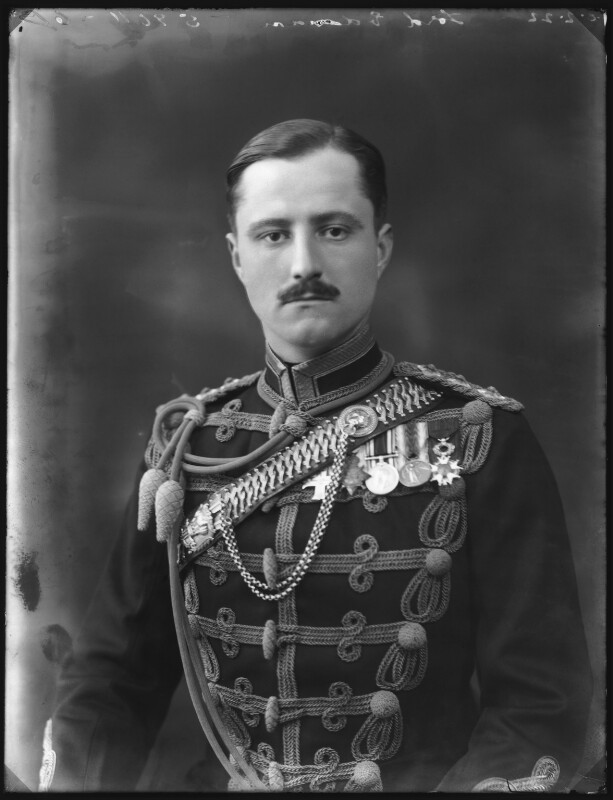

Member of Parliament for Wednesbury
- In office 1931–1932
- Preceded by: Alfred Short
- Succeeded by: John William Banfield

Member of Parliament for Hornsey
- In office 1921–1924
- Preceded by: William Kennedy Jones
- Succeeded by: Euan Wallace

Personal details
- Born: William Humble Eric Ward; 30 January 1894
- Died: 26 December 1969 (aged 75)
- Party: Conservative
- Spouses: Lady Rosemary Sutherland-Leveson-Gower (m. 1919; died 1930) Laura, Viscountess Long (m. 1943; div. 1954) Grace Maria Radziwill (m. 1961)
- Children: 3, including William, 4th Earl of Dudley
- Parent(s): William Ward, 2nd Earl of Dudley; Rachel Gurney
- Education: Eton College

William Humble Eric Ward, 3rd Earl of Dudley, MC TD (30 January 1894 – 26 December 1969), known as Viscount Ednam until 1932, was a British Conservative Party politician.

== Early life ==
Lord Dudley was the eldest son of William Ward, 2nd Earl of Dudley, and his wife Rachel (née Gurney) CBE. Among his siblings was George Ward, 1st Viscount Ward of Witley, Lady Gladys Honor Ward and Lady Morvyth Lillian Ward (wife of Constantine Evelyn Benson, a grandson of Robert Stayner Holford).

His paternal grandparents were William Ward, 1st Earl of Dudley and the former Georgina Elizabeth Moncreiffe (third daughter of Sir Thomas Moncreiffe, 7th Baronet and Lady Louisa Hay, the eldest daughter of Thomas Hay-Drummond, 11th Earl of Kinnoull). His maternal grandparents were Charles Henry Gurney and Alice Prinsep Gurney (a daughter of Henry Thoby Prinsep of the Bengal Civil Service). His maternal aunt was Laura, Lady Troubridge.

He was educated at Eton.

== Career ==
Ward inherited a number of industrial concerns in the Black Country region of England, notably the Round Oak Steelworks and Baggeridge Colliery. In 1937, he set up Dudley Zoo within the grounds of Dudley Castle, once the seat of the Barons of Dudley.

=== Military service ===
Dudley was commissioned into the Worcestershire Yeomanry in 1912. In 1914 he transferred to the regular 10th Hussars. He was promoted lieutenant in 1915 and ended the World War I as a captain, and had been awarded the Military Cross.

After the war, he joined the Staffordshire Yeomanry, becoming a major and receiving the Territorial Decoration. In 1933 he was appointed Honorary Colonel of the 51st (Midland) Medium Brigade, Royal Artillery.

=== Political career ===
Dudley sat as the Member of Parliament (MP) for Hornsey from 1921 to 1924 and for Wednesbury from 1931 to 1932 and served as Parliamentary Private Secretary to the Under-Secretary of State for India, Lord Winterton, between 1922 and 1924. He also held the honorary post of High Sheriff of Worcestershire in 1930.

In the House of Lords, Dudley was notable for opposing the Sexual Offences Act 1967, which partially decriminalized male homosexuality. He stated,

"I cannot stand homosexuals. They are the most disgusting people in the world... Prison is much too good a place for them; in fact, that is a place where many of them like to go—for obvious reasons."

Gay rights activist Peter Tatchell said, "The Earl of Dudley's contribution in the Lords sums up the level of the opposition's argument [to the bill]."

== Personal life ==
Dudley married firstly Lady Rosemary Millicent Sutherland-Leveson-Gower (1893–1930), only surviving daughter of Cromartie Sutherland-Leveson-Gower, 4th Duke of Sutherland, on 8 March 1919. She died in a plane crash in 1930, aged 36. Their children were:

- William Ward, 4th Earl of Dudley (1920–2013), who married Stella Carcano y Morra, a daughter of Don Miguel Angel Carcano, who was the Argentine Ambassador to the UK. They divorced in 1960 and he married the Scottish actress and socialite Maureen Swanson.
- John Jeremy Ward (1922–1929).
- Peter Alistair Ward (1926–2008), who married Claire Leonora Baring, a granddaughter of Guy Baring, in 1956. They had several children including the actress and environmentalist Tracy Louise Ward (former wife of Henry Somerset, 12th Duke of Beaufort) and actress Rachel Ward before divorcing.

He married secondly Viscountess (Frances) Laura Long née Charteris (1915–1990), daughter of Guy Lawrence Charteris and former wife of Walter Long, 2nd Viscount Long, on 25 February 1943. The marriage was childless and they were divorced in 1954. Laura went on to marry Michael Temple Canfield in 1960 and, after his death in 1969, John Spencer-Churchill, 10th Duke of Marlborough shortly before his death.

In 1961, Dudley married thirdly to Grace Maria (née Kolin) Radziwill (1923–2016). She was the former wife of Prince Stanislaus Radziwill (The Prince's third wife, Lee Radziwiłł, was formerly married to Michael Temple Canfield, the third husband of Ward's second wife, Laura). This marriage was also childless.

Dudley died in December 1969, aged 75, and was succeeded by his eldest son William.

After his death, his widow lived with the American editor Robert B. Silvers for nearly four decades from 1975 until her death in 2016.

=== Other relationships ===
He is rumored to have fathered a daughter, Judy Montagu, in 1923 with the aristocrat and socialite Venetia Stanley, although the legal father was her husband Edwin Samuel Montagu. She grew up to befriend Princess Margaret during World War II and marry the American photographer Milton Gendel, with whom she created an artistic salon in Italy.

Mandy Rice-Davies claimed that the Earl was one of the customers at Murray's Cabaret Club, where she worked as a showgirl, and that he proposed to her when she was 17. "I could have been a dowager duchess by the time I was 22." she said.

He was a close friend of the Prince of Wales, later King Edward VIII, who spent his last weekend as king at Himley Hall, before his abdication in 1936.

== Notes ==
Parliament of the United Kingdom
Preceded by William Kennedy Jones	Member of Parliament for Hornsey; 1921–1924	Succeeded by Euan Wallace
Preceded by Alfred Short	Member of Parliament for Wednesbury; 1931–1932	Succeeded by John William Banfield
Peerage of the United Kingdom
Preceded by William Ward	Earl of Dudley; 1932–1969	Succeeded by William Humble Davis Ward
