= 1941 Hornsey by-election =

UK Parliamentary by-election

← 1935	28 May 1941	1945 →

Constituency of Hornsey
- Turnout: 21.1% (▼45.9%)
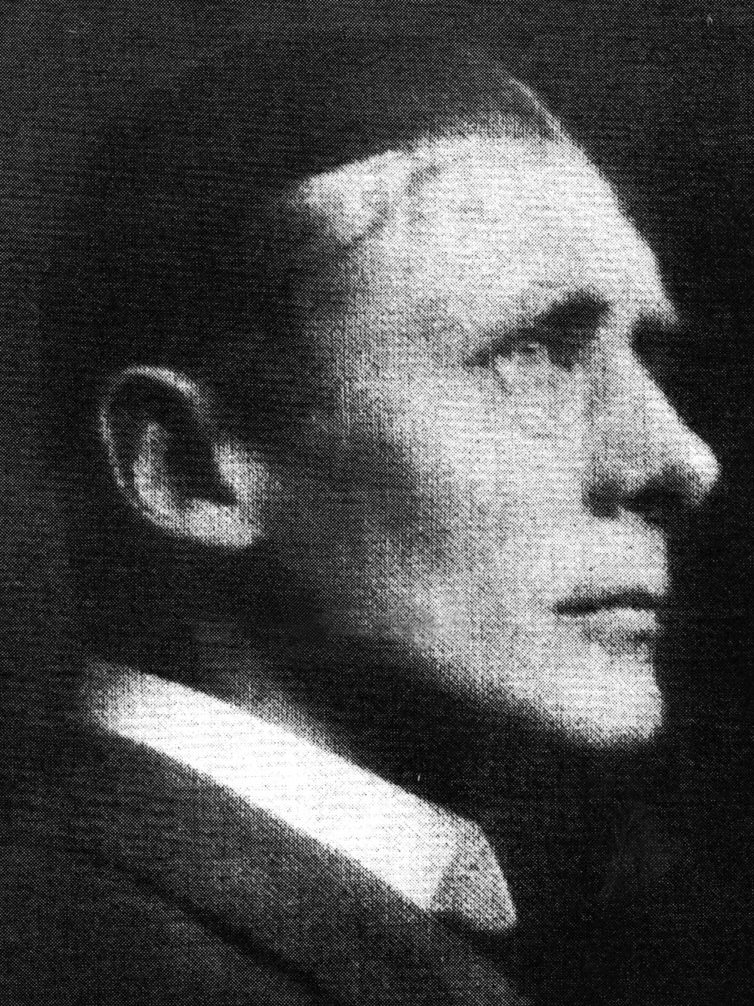
	First party	Second party
	Con
Candidate	David Gammans	Noel Pemberton Billing
Party	Conservative	National
Popular vote	11,077	4,146
Percentage	72.8%	27.2%
Swing	▲7.9%	N/A
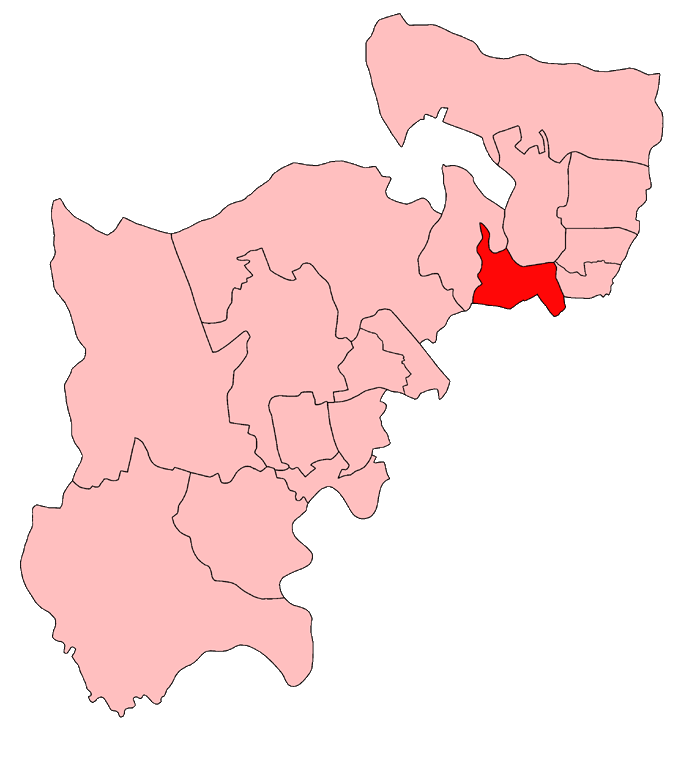
- A map of parliamentary constituencies within the county of Middlesex at the time of the by-election, with Hornsey highlighted in red.
MP before election
Euan Wallace
Conservative
Subsequent MP
Muriel Gammans
Conservative

The 1941 Hornsey by-election was held on 28 May 1941. The by-election was held due to the death of the incumbent Conservative MP, Euan Wallace. It was won by the Conservative candidate David Gammans.

Hornsey by-election, 1941 Electorate 72,298
Party	Candidate	Votes	%	±%
Conservative	David Gammans	11,077	72.8	+7.9
National	Noel Pemberton Billing	4,146	27.2	N/A
Majority		6,931	45.6	+2.6
Turnout		15,223	21.1	−45.9
Conservative hold		Swing		
