= Kennedy Jones (journalist) =

British journalist and politician

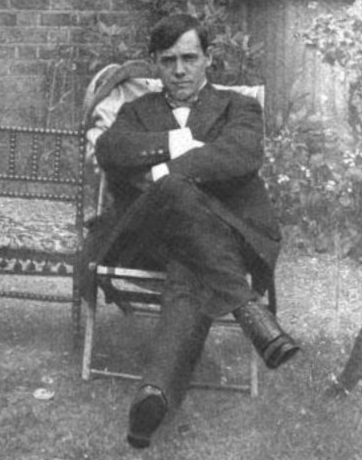
- In The Sketch, 16 November 1898

Member of Parliament for Hornsey
- In office 6 December 1916 – 20 October 1921
- Preceded by: Lawrence Dundas, Earl of Ronaldshay
- Succeeded by: William Ward, Viscount Ednam

Personal details
- Born: William Kennedy Jones; 4 May 1865 Glasgow, Scotland, UK
- Died: 20 October 1921 (aged 56) London, England, UK
- Party: Unionist
- Children: One son, three daughters
- Occupation: Journalist, editor, politician
- Nickname: K.J.

William Kennedy Jones (4 May 1865 – 20 October 1921) was a British journalist, editor, businessman, newspaper manager and Member of Parliament.

== Early years ==
Born in Glasgow, "K.J." (as he was known to his friends) was educated at a local high school before leaving at the age of sixteen to start a career in journalism. He worked as a reporter and sub-editor for local newspapers, including The News and the Evening News. Moving south in the late 1880s, he worked for papers in Leicester and Birmingham before moving to London in search of employment there. Though his contribution to starting a new newspaper, The Evening, in 1892 proved futile, he remained convinced that a halfpenny morning daily would be economically viable.

== Work with Northcliffe ==
After working for a time for The Sun as chief sub-editor, in 1894 he took a gamble along with The Sun's assistant editor, Louis Tracy and acquired an option to purchase the Evening News. Though enjoying a circulation of 100,000, the newspaper was running at a loss, and Jones and Tracy both hoped to sell the paper quickly to Alfred Harmsworth, who was looking to purchase his first London daily. In August the three signed an agreement in which Jones and Tracey each received 7½ per cent of the profits generated by the newspaper. Jones soon took over as editor, remaking the paper with new typography and a greater emphasis on sports coverage, competitions, serialized fiction, and attention-grabbing feature articles, at which Jones excelled. This was a new style of journalism which proved enormously profitable.

Jones's gruff, abrasive manner soon helped established him as Harmsworth's business manager, and Harmsworth gave him considerable freedom in making decisions. In 1895 Jones acquired the Glasgow Daily Record, as part of a plan to acquire a chain of provincial dailies. This plan was abandoned the following year with the launch of the Daily Mail, which embodied Jones' vision of an halfpenny paper marketed to the middle class and produced in London for a nationwide market. Though not the editor, Jones was in charge of the style and content, and his instinct for what his readers wanted helped make the Daily Mail a runaway success, growing from an initial planned run of 100,000 to over 500,000 copies in circulation within three years of its launch.

Though he seemed to enjoy his hard-nosed reputation as Harmsworth's business manager, Jones was capable of acting with more subtlety, as he did in 1908 when he served as an intermediary for Harmsworth's ultimately successful negotiations to purchase The Times. Though Jones introduced many of his innovations, he was not elected to the paper's board of directors and was denied the editorial influence he expected. After an intestinal operation in 1912, Jones sold his shares in the newspapers at a handsome profit, retaining a chairmanship of Waring & Gillow until 1914.

== Later years ==
Having retired from business, Jones turned to politics. He ran as an independent in a 1916 by-election for Wimbledon, enjoying a protest vote against the prevailing wartime party truce but ultimately losing the seat to Stuart Coats. A few months later, he ran unopposed as a Unionist in a by-election for Hornsey.

He worked for the Ministry of Food in 1917 and demonstrated an interest in London's transport issues. He founded The East Finchley Constitutional Club which is still open. He was a member of the Sylvan Debating Club. He died of pneumonia at his home in London on 20 October 1921, and was cremated at Golders Green Crematorium.

== Personal life ==
In 1892 Kennedy Jones married Hetty, daughter of James Staniland of Birmingham, by whom he had one son and three daughters. One daughter, Mary Janet, married the cricketer Bernard Bosanquet and became mother of journalist and broadcaster Reginald Bosanquet.

== Works ==
- Fleet Street and Downing Street (1919)

Parliament of the United Kingdom
Preceded by Earl of Ronaldshay	Member of Parliament for Hornsey; 1916 – 1921	Succeeded by Viscount Ednam
Media offices
Preceded by J.H. Copleston	Editor of the Evening News; 1894–1896	Succeeded by Walter Evans
