= Hornsey (constituency) =

Parliamentary constituency in the United Kingdom, 1885–1983

- Former borough constituency for the House of Commons
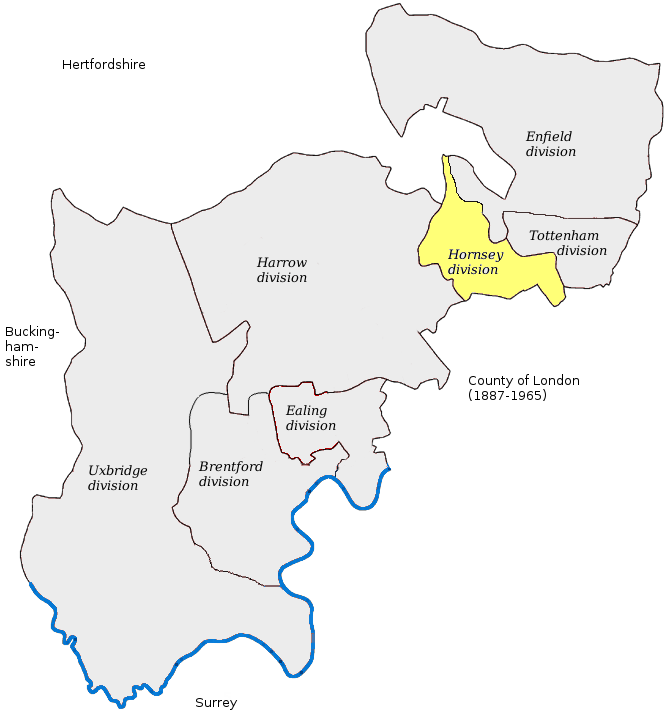
- Hornsey 1885–1918

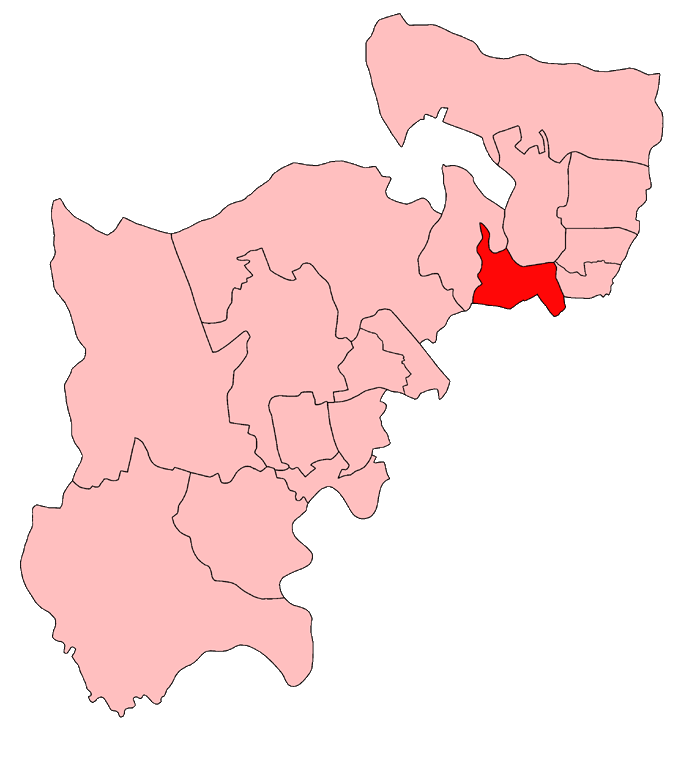
- Hornsey 1918–1950
- County: 1885–1965: Middlesex; 1965–1983: Greater London

1918–1983
- Seats: One
- Replaced by: Hornsey & Wood Green (newly created seat); Tottenham (minor additions to)

1885–1918
- Seats: One
- Type of constituency: County constituency
- Created from: Middlesex
- Replaced by: Borough version above and Finchley (newly created seat in 1918 using mainly western part of)

Map that gives each named seat and any constant electoral success for national (Westminster) elections for Middlesex, 1955 to 1974.

Hornsey /ˈhɔːrnˌziː/ was a constituency that returned one Member of Parliament (MP) to the House of Commons of the UK Parliament, 1885 — 1983. It was then largely replaced by Hornsey & Wood Green. Its voters using the first-past-the-post system elected the Conservative Party candidate at each election. Its closest result was a 1.29% majority at the 1966 election which saw the start of the Second Wilson Ministry. From 1945 onwards the runners-up in the seat were the Labour Party candidates.

== History ==
From 1885 to 1918, the constituency was a county division of Middlesex, and in 1918 it became a parliamentary borough. From 1950 it was a borough constituency. The seat was won exclusively by the Conservatives throughout its history, though became a more marginal contest between them and the Labour Party from 1964 until its abolition in 1983.

In 1966, 11.9% was born in the New Commonwealth.

== Boundaries ==
1885–1918: The Parishes of Hornsey (including South Hornsey) and Finchley (and the area included in the Parliamentary Boroughs of the City of London, Finsbury, and Islington for many wealthy voters this sub-provision gave a choice of which seat to vote for).

1918–1974: The Municipal Borough of Hornsey.

1974–1983: The London Borough of Haringey wards of Central Hornsey, Crouch End, Fortis Green, Highgate, Muswell Hill, South Hornsey, Stroud Green, and Turnpike.

== Members of Parliament ==
Year	Member	Party	Notes
1885	James McGarel-Hogg	Conservative	Raised to the peerage as Baron Magheramorne
1887 by-election	Henry Stephens	Conservative	
1900	Charles Balfour	Conservative	
1907 by-election	Lawrence Dundas	Conservative	Resigned to become Governor of Bengal
1916 by-election	Kennedy Jones	Conservative	Died October 1921
1921 by-election	William Ward	Conservative	
1924	Euan Wallace	Conservative	Member for Rugby (1922–1923); Minister of Transport (1939–1940); Died February 1941
1941 by-election	David Gammans	Conservative	Died February 1957
1957 by-election	Muriel Gammans	Conservative	
1966	Hugh Rossi	Conservative	Minister of State for Social Security (1981–1983); Contested Hornsey and Wood Green following redistribution
1983	constituency abolished: see Hornsey and Wood Green		

== Election results ==
=== Elections in the 1880s ===
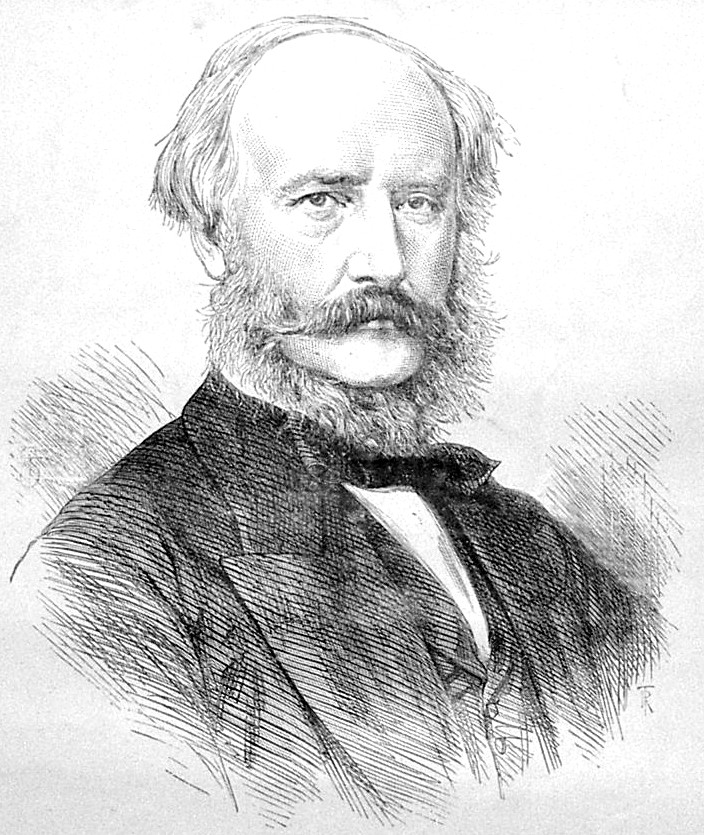
McGarel-Hogg

General election 1885: Hornsey
Party	Candidate	Votes	%
Conservative	James McGarel-Hogg	4,619	58.3
Liberal	William Edwardes	3,299	41.7
Majority		1,320	16.6
Turnout		7,918	74.4
Registered electors		10,648	
Conservative win (new seat)			

General election 1886: Hornsey
Party	Candidate	Votes	%	±%
Conservative	James McGarel-Hogg	Unopposed		
Conservative hold				

McGarel-Hogg was elevated to the peerage, becoming Lord Magheramorne, causing a by-election.

Stephens

By-election, 19 Jul 1887: Hornsey
Party	Candidate	Votes	%	±%
Conservative	Henry Stephens	4,476	64.3	N/A
Liberal	Horatio Bottomley	2,488	35.7	New
Majority		1,988	28.6	N/A
Turnout		6,964	64.4	N/A
Registered electors		10,814		
Conservative hold		Swing	N/A	

=== Elections in the 1890s ===
General election 1892: Hornsey
Party	Candidate	Votes	%	±%
Conservative	Henry Stephens	6,192	68.0	N/A
Liberal	Thomas Rees Sydenham-Jones	2,913	32.0	N/A
Majority		3,279	36.0	N/A
Turnout		9,105	67.7	N/A
Registered electors		13,451		
Conservative hold		Swing	N/A	

General election 1895: Hornsey
Party	Candidate	Votes	%	±%
Conservative	Henry Stephens	Unopposed		
Conservative hold				

=== Elections in the 1900s ===
General election 1900: Hornsey
Party	Candidate	Votes	%	±%
Conservative	Charles Balfour	Unopposed		
Conservative hold				

General election 1906: Hornsey
Party	Candidate	Votes	%	±%
Conservative	Charles Balfour	8,859	54.9	N/A
Liberal	C W Tomkinson	7,289	45.1	New
Majority		1,570	9.8	N/A
Turnout		16,148	82.2	N/A
Registered electors		19,651		
Conservative hold		Swing	N/A	

1907 Hornsey by-election
Party	Candidate	Votes	%	±%
Conservative	Lawrence Dundas	Unopposed		
Conservative hold				

=== Elections in the 1910s ===
General election January 1910: Hornsey
Party	Candidate	Votes	%	±%
Conservative	Lawrence Dundas	12,014	58.2	+3.3
Liberal	Robert Dummett	8,633	41.8	−3.3
Majority		3,381	16.4	N/A
Turnout		20,647	87.7	N/A
Conservative hold		Swing	N/A	

General election December 1910: Hornsey
Party	Candidate	Votes	%	±%
Conservative	Lawrence Dundas	11,066	59.2	+1.0
Liberal	Robert Dummett	7,613	40.8	−1.0
Majority		3,453	18.4	+2.0
Turnout		18,679	79.4	−8.3
Conservative hold		Swing	+1.0	

General Election 1914–15:

Another General Election was required to take place before the end of 1915. The political parties had been making preparations for an election to take place and by July 1914, the following candidates had been selected;

- Unionist: Lawrence Dundas
- Liberal:

1916 Hornsey by-election
Party	Candidate	Votes	%	±%
Unionist	Kennedy Jones	Unopposed		
Unionist hold				

General election 1918: Hornsey
Party		Candidate	Votes	%	±%
C	Unionist	Kennedy Jones	Unopposed		
	Unionist hold				
C indicates candidate endorsed by the coalition government.

=== Elections in the 1920s ===
1921 Hornsey by-election
Party	Candidate	Votes	%	±%
Unionist	William Ward	15,959	53.4	N/A
Liberal	Leslie Burgin	13,943	46.6	New
Majority		2,016	6.8	N/A
Turnout		29,902	65.7	N/A
Registered electors		45,510		
Unionist hold		Swing	N/A	

General election 1922: Hornsey
Party	Candidate	Votes	%	±%
Unionist	William Ward	18,462	53.2	N/A
Liberal	Leslie Burgin	16,239	46.8	N/A
Majority		2,223	6.4	N/A
Turnout		34,701	77.2	N/A
Registered electors		44,964		
Unionist hold		Swing	N/A	

General election 1923: Hornsey
Party	Candidate	Votes	%	±%
Unionist	William Ward	16,812	47.4	−5.8
Liberal	Leslie Burgin	15,197	42.8	−4.0
Labour	Christopher Francis Healy	3,487	9.8	New
Majority		1,615	4.6	−1.8
Turnout		35,496	76.6	−0.6
Registered electors		46,312		
Unionist hold		Swing	−0.9	

General election 1924: Hornsey
Party	Candidate	Votes	%	±%
Unionist	Euan Wallace	21,017	54.6	+7.2
Liberal	Leslie Burgin	13,217	34.3	−8.5
Labour	Christopher Francis Healy	4,277	11.1	+1.3
Majority		7,800	20.3	+15.7
Turnout		38,511	81.6	+5.0
Registered electors		47,174		
Unionist hold		Swing	+7.9	

General election 1929: Hornsey
Party	Candidate	Votes	%	±%
Unionist	Euan Wallace	25,540	51.0	−3.6
Liberal	William Thomson	16,029	32.0	−2.3
Labour	Francis Henry Wiltshire	8,529	17.0	+5.9
Majority		9,511	19.0	−1.3
Turnout		50,098	75.2	−6.4
Registered electors		66,620		
Unionist hold		Swing	−0.7	

=== Elections in the 1930s ===
General election 1931: Hornsey
Party	Candidate	Votes	%	±%
Conservative	Euan Wallace	41,194	84.5	+33.5
Labour	Hugh Franklin	7,585	15.5	−1.5
Majority		33,609	69.0	+50.0
Turnout		48,779	70.3	−4.9
Conservative hold		Swing		

General election 1935: Hornsey
Party	Candidate	Votes	%	±%
Conservative	Euan Wallace	30,494	64.9	−19.6
Labour	Mari Power	10,320	21.9	+6.4
Liberal	Herbert Baxter	6,206	13.2	New
Majority		20,174	43.0	−26.0
Turnout		47,020	67.0	−3.3
Conservative hold		Swing		

General Election 1939–40:

Another General Election was required to take place before the end of 1940. The political parties had been making preparations for an election to take place and by the Autumn of 1939, the following candidates had been selected;

- Conservative: Euan Wallace
- Labour: JT Murphy

=== Elections in the 1940s ===
1941 Hornsey by-election
Party	Candidate	Votes	%	±%
Conservative	David Gammans	11,077	72.8	+7.9
National	Noel Pemberton Billing	4,146	27.2	New
Majority		6,931	45.6	+2.6
Turnout		15,223	21.1	−45.9
Conservative hold		Swing		

General election 1945: Hornsey
Party	Candidate	Votes	%	±%
Conservative	David Gammans	24,684	52.8	−12.1
Labour	Bill Fiske	12,015	25.7	+3.8
Communist	George John Jones	10,058	21.5	New
Majority		12,669	27.1	−15.9
Turnout		46,757	73.1	+6.1
Conservative hold		Swing		

=== Elections in the 1950s ===
General election 1950: Hornsey
Party	Candidate	Votes	%	±%
Conservative	David Gammans	33,927	53.8	+1.0
Labour	Reginald Pestell	22,832	36.2	+10.5
Liberal	Adrienne Leevers	5,122	8.1	New
Communist	George John Jones	1,191	1.9	−19.6
Majority		11,095	17.6	−9.5
Turnout		63,072		
Conservative hold		Swing		

- Archive footage of the result and speeches from 3:57: https://www.youtube.com/watch?v=yTmt5Rz-DTA

General election 1951: Hornsey
Party	Candidate	Votes	%	±%
Conservative	David Gammans	36,417	58.7	+4.9
Labour	Reginald Pestell	25,643	41.3	+5.1
Majority		10,774	17.4	−0.2
Turnout		62,060		
Conservative hold		Swing		

General election 1955: Hornsey
Party	Candidate	Votes	%	±%
Conservative	David Gammans	33,294	60.2	+1.5
Labour	Frederick Evelyn Mostyn	20,568	37.2	−4.1
Communist	George John Jones	1,442	2.6	New
Majority		12,726	23.0	+5.6
Turnout		55,304		
Conservative hold		Swing		

1957 Hornsey by-election
Party	Candidate	Votes	%	±%
Conservative	Muriel Gammans	24,169	53.5	−6.7
Labour	Frederick Evelyn Mostyn	21,038	46.5	+9.3
Majority		3,131	7.0	−16.0
Turnout		45,207		
Conservative hold		Swing	-8.0	

General election 1959: Hornsey
Party	Candidate	Votes	%	±%
Conservative	Muriel Gammans	30,048	55.06	
Labour	Frederick Evelyn Mostyn	17,710	32.45	
Liberal	Samuel Solomon	5,706	10.46	New
Communist	George John Jones	1,107	2.03	
Majority		12,338	22.61	
Turnout		54,571		
Conservative hold		Swing		

=== Elections in the 1960s ===
General election 1964: Hornsey
Party	Candidate	Votes	%	±%
Conservative	Muriel Gammans	22,590	46.68	−8.38
Labour	C Stephen Yeo	18,528	38.29	+5.84
Liberal	Samuel Solomon	6,015	12.43	+1.97
Communist	Max Morris	1,258	2.60	+0.57
Majority		4,062	8.39	−14.22
Turnout		48,391	70.45	−6.25
Conservative hold		Swing	-7.11	

General election 1966: Hornsey
Party	Candidate	Votes	%	±%
Conservative	Hugh Rossi	21,116	44.15	−2.53
Labour	C Stephen Yeo	20,501	42.86	+4.57
Liberal	Percy W Meyer	5,026	10.51	−1.92
Communist	Max Morris	1,184	2.48	−0.12
Majority		615	1.29	−7.10
Turnout		47,827	72.75	+2.30
Conservative hold		Swing	-3.55	

=== Elections in the 1970s ===
General election 1970: Hornsey
Party	Candidate	Votes	%	±%
Conservative	Hugh Rossi	21,434	49.14	+4.99
Labour	Philip Wells-Pestell	17,645	40.46	−2.40
Liberal	Laurence S Brass	3,755	8.61	−1.90
Communist	Margaret Morris	624	1.43	−1.05
Socialist (GB)	Edmund Grant	156	0.36	New
Majority		3,789	8.68	+7.39
Turnout		43,614	67.37	−5.38
Conservative hold		Swing	+3.70	

General election February 1974: Hornsey
Party	Candidate	Votes	%	±%
Conservative	Hugh Rossi	18,792	42.66	−6.48
Labour	Irving Howard Kuczynski	16,584	37.65	−2.81
Liberal	Patrick William O'Brien	8,676	19.69	+11.09
Majority		2,208	5.01	−3.68
Turnout		44,052	75.96	+8.59
Conservative hold		Swing	–1.84	

General election October 1974: Hornsey
Party	Candidate	Votes	%	±%
Conservative	Hugh Rossi	17,226	43.14	+0.49
Labour	Irving Howard Kuczynski	16,444	41.19	+3.54
Liberal	Philip Laurence Smulian	5,283	13.23	−6.46
National Front	Jennifer Stubbs	973	2.44	New
Majority		782	1.95	−3.06
Turnout		39,926	68.52	−7.44
Conservative hold		Swing	-1.53	

General election 1979: Hornsey
Party	Candidate	Votes	%	±%
Conservative	Hugh Rossi	20,225	49.37	+6.23
Labour	Edward Robert Knight	16,188	39.52	−1.67
Liberal	Patrick William O'Brien	4,058	9.91	−3.32
National Front	Bruce William Pell	337	0.82	−1.61
Ind. Conservative	Derek Walter Berry	156	0.38	New
Majority		4,037	9.85	+7.90
Turnout		40,964	70.13	+1.61
Conservative hold		Swing	+3.95	
