= 1907 Hornsey by-election =

UK Parliamentary by-election

The 1907 Hornsey by-election was held on 5 June 1907. The by-election was held due to the resignation of the incumbent Conservative MP, Charles Balfour. It was won by the Conservative candidate Lawrence Dundas, who was unopposed.
