= Snelsmore =

Hamlet in Berkshire, England

Coordinates: 51.450282°N 1.327171°W

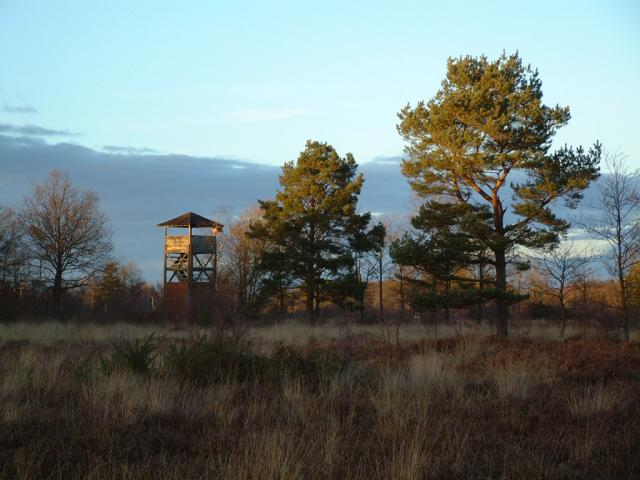
- Snelsmore Common

- Location within Berkshire
- OS grid reference: SU468721
- Metropolitan borough: West Berkshire
- Metropolitan county: Berkshire
- Region: South East
- Country: England
- Sovereign state: United Kingdom
- Post town: NEWBURY
- Postcode district: RG14
- Dialling code: 01635
- Police: Thames Valley
- Fire: Royal Berkshire
- Ambulance: South Central
- UK Parliament: Berkshire

Snelsmore is a hamlet in Berkshire, England, and part of the civil parish of Chieveley. The settlement lies near to junction 13 of the M4 motorway, and is located approximately 3.5 miles (5.6 km) north of Newbury.

== Transport ==
Bus travel from Newbury is provided by Newbury and District service 107.
