= Lawrence Dundas, 2nd Marquess of Zetland =

British Conservative politician

The Most Honourable The Marquess of Zetland KG GCSI GCIE PC JP DL
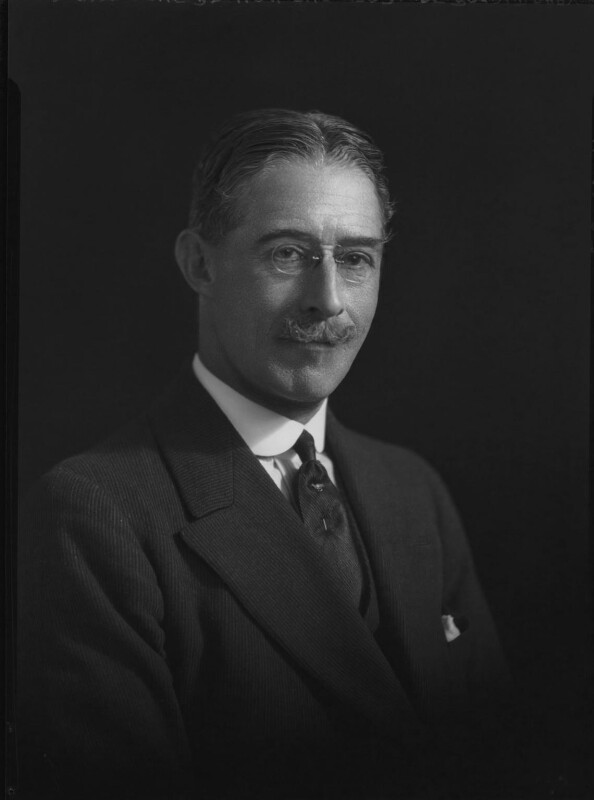

Secretary of State for India and Burma
- In office 28 May 1937 – 13 May 1940
- Monarch: George VI
- Prime Minister: Neville Chamberlain
- Preceded by: New office
- Succeeded by: Leo Amery

Secretary of State for India
- In office 7 June 1935 – 28 May 1937
- Monarchs: George V Edward VIII; George VI
- Prime Minister: Stanley Baldwin
- Preceded by: Sir Samuel Hoare, Bt
- Succeeded by: Office renamed Secretary of State for India and Burma

Governor of Bengal
- In office 26 March 1917 – 28 March 1922
- Governor General: The Viscount Chelmsford
- Preceded by: The Lord Carmichael
- Succeeded by: The Earl of Lytton

Member of the House of Lords Lord Temporal
- In office 12 March 1929 – 6 February 1961; Hereditary Peerage
- Preceded by: The 1st Marquess of Zetland
- Succeeded by: The 3rd Marquess of Zetland

Member of Parliament for Hornsey
- In office 5 June 1907 – 6 December 1916
- Preceded by: Charles Balfour
- Succeeded by: Kennedy Jones

Personal details
- Born: 11 June 1876 London, England, United Kingdom
- Died: 6 February 1961 (aged 84) Richmond, England, United Kingdom
- Party: Conservative
- Spouse: Cicely Archdale (m. 1907)
- Parents: Lawrence Dundas (father); Lady Lilian Selena Elizabeth Lumley (mother)
- Relatives: John Dundas (brother); Lawrence Dundas (son); Richard Lumley (maternal grandfather)
- Education: Trinity College, Cambridge

Lawrence John Lumley Dundas, 2nd Marquess of Zetland (11 June 1876 – 6 February 1961), styled Lord Dundas until 1892 and Earl of Ronaldshay between 1892 and 1929, was a British hereditary peer and Conservative politician. An expert on India, he served as Secretary of State for India in the late 1930s.

== Early life and education ==
Zetland was born in London in 1876, the eldest surviving son of Lawrence Dundas, 1st Marquess of Zetland, and his wife Lady Lilian Selena Elizabeth Lumley, daughter of Richard Lumley, 9th Earl of Scarbrough. He was educated at Harrow School and Trinity College, Cambridge. At Cambridge, he was a member of the University Pitt Club.

== Political career ==
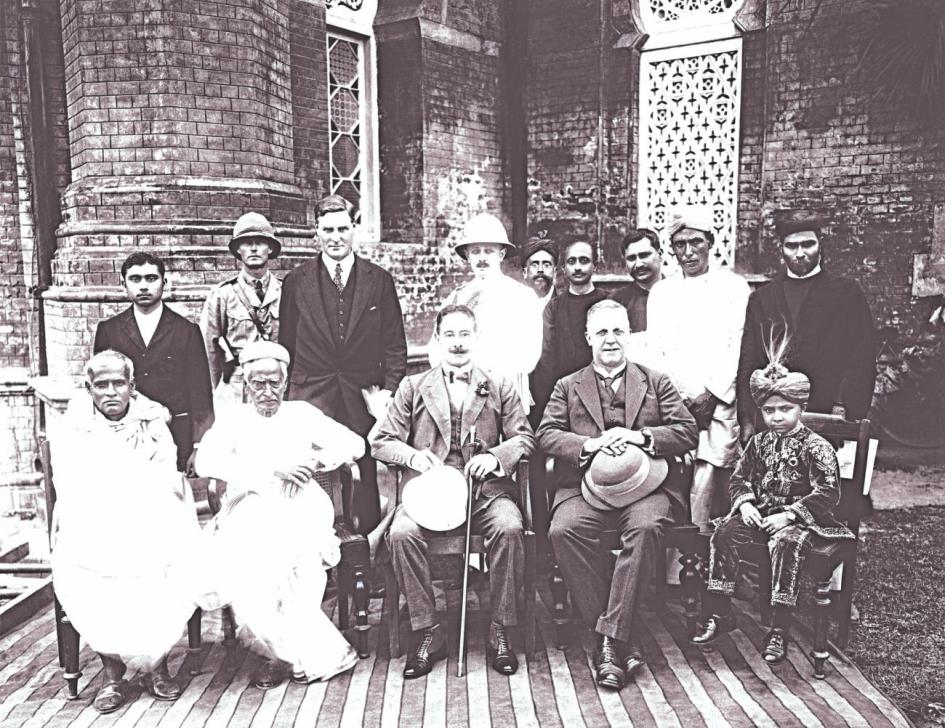
Zetland as a Governor of Bengal in Dhaka (1919)

Lord Ronaldshay was commissioned a lieutenant in the North Riding of York Volunteer Artillery. He was on 3 April 1900 appointed an extra aide-de-camp to Lord Curzon, Viceroy of India. While working for Curzon in the British Raj, Ronaldshay travelled widely through Asia, having experiences which would later inform his fictional and non-fictional writing.

Zetland was returned to Parliament for Hornsey in 1907, a seat he held until 1916. Much of his public career centred on British India. In September 1912, he was appointed (with Lord Islington, Herbert Fisher, Mr Justice Abdur Rahim, and others) as a member of the Royal Commission on the Public Services in India of 1912–1915. He was Governor of Bengal between 1917 and 1922 and Secretary of State for India between 1935 and 1940. Although a member of the Conservative Party, his belief was that Indians should be allowed to take ever-increasing responsibility for the government of the country, culminating in Dominion status (enjoyed by Canada, Australia, and other formerly self-governing parts of the British Empire).

Zetland played an important role in the protracted negotiations which led to the Government of India Act 1935, which began, subject to the implacable opposition of Winston Churchill and the "diehards" to anything that might imperil direct British rule over India, to implement those ideals.

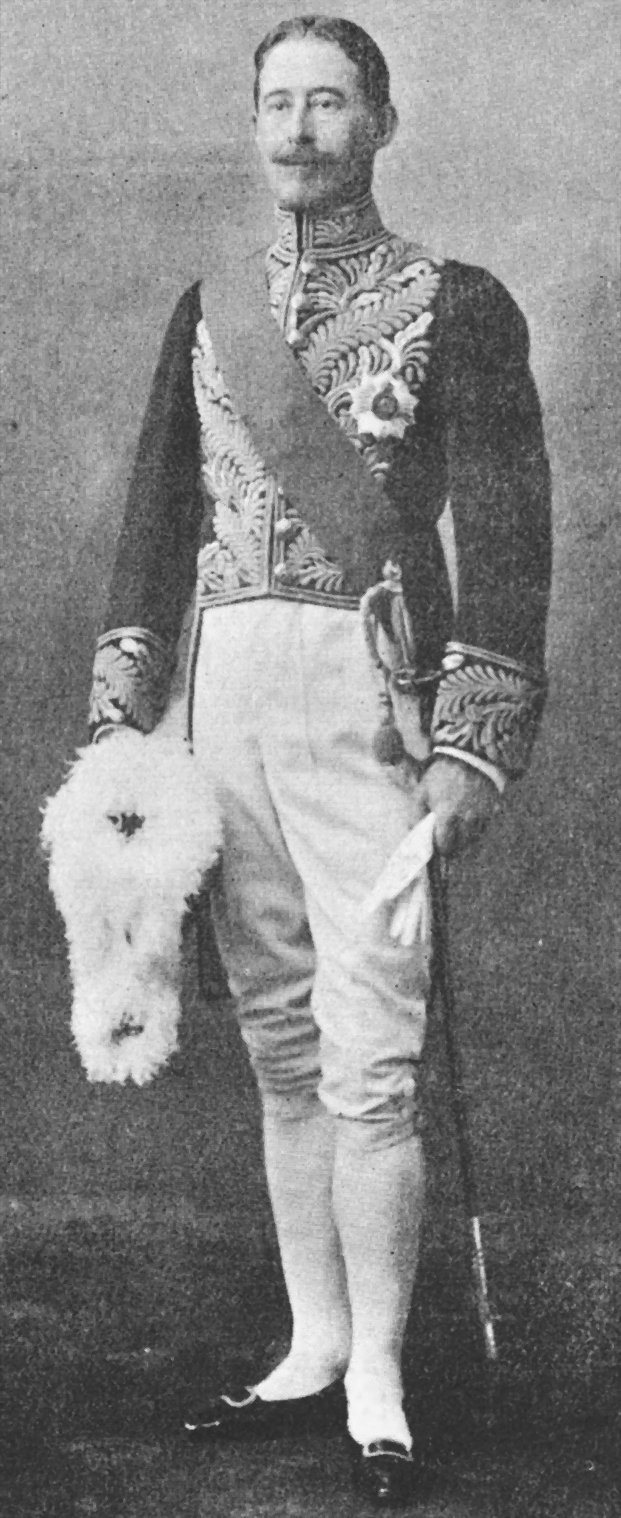
Lord Ronaldshay as Governor of Bengal (1917–22).

Zetland was also an author: Rab Butler, who served as his Parliamentary Under-Secretary at the India Office, records that he asked how he could understand better his chief's thinking about the future of India and received the answer: "Read my books!" Zetland kept Butler, who had helped to pass the Government of India Act and had enjoyed great influence under Zetland's predecessor Samuel Hoare, at arm's length, requiring him to book an appointment in advance if he wanted to see him. Butler continued to serve under him for another two years, but devotes only a single paragraph to this period in his memoirs.

Zetland was ideally placed as Secretary of State for India to implement the new Act, although the two Viceroys with whom he served, Lords Willingdon and Linlithgow, were rather less idealistic than he. In the event, Willingdon and Linlithgow were proved right when the Congress Party won the 1937 Provincial elections, much to the dismay of Zetland. Zetland's term as Secretary of State — and the experiment with democracy represented by the 1935 Act — came to an end with Churchill's assumption of the Prime Ministership in 1940: Zetland then offered his resignation, feeling that his ideas and Churchill's regarding India were so different that "I could only end by becoming an embarrassment to him." Two months prior to this, on 13 March 1940, Zetland was one of four people shot at the Caxton Hall by Indian nationalist Udham Singh; former lieutenant governor of the Punjab, Michael O'Dwyer, was killed. Zetland suffered only bruising to his ribs (the bullet was found in his clothes) and was able to take his seat in the House of Lords five days later.

Zetland, who was known to favour good relations between the UK and Germany, was associated with the Anglo-German Fellowship during the late 1930s.

Zetland was sworn of the Privy Council in 1922 and made a Knight of the Garter in 1942. He also bore the Sword of State at the coronation of George VI in 1937 and was Lord Lieutenant of the North Riding of Yorkshire between 1945 and 1951. He was elected President of the Royal Geographical Society in 1922 and President of the Royal Asiatic Society of Great Britain and Ireland for 1928–31. From 1932 to 1945, he was chairman of the National Trust.

== Marriage and children ==
Lord Ronaldshay married on 3 December 1907 to Cicely Archdale (1886–1973), daughter of Mervyn Henry Archdale. They lived at Snelsmore at Chieveley in Berkshire, and had five children:

- Lawrence Aldred Mervyn Dundas, 3rd Marquess of Zetland (12 November 1908 - 5 October 1989)
- Lady Viola Mary Dundas (4 January 1910 - 21 March 1995)
- Lady Lavinia Margaret Dundas (31 December 1914 – 4 January 1974)
- Lady Jean Agatha Dundas (4 May 1916 – 13 May 1995), married on 2 September 1939 to Hector Lorenzo Christie.
- Flight Sergeant Lord Bruce Thomas Dundas (18 October 1920 – 24 February 1942), killed in action with the Royal Air Force Volunteer Reserve.

== Death ==
Lord Zetland died in 1961 at the age of 84 and was succeeded in the marquessate and other titles by his elder and only surviving son, Lawrence. The Marchioness of Zetland died in January 1973.

== Arms ==
Coat of arms of Lawrence Dundas, 2nd Marquess of Zetland
Coronet A Coronet of a Marquess Crest A Lion's Head affrontée struggling through an Oak Bush all proper fructed Or crowned with an Antique Crown of the last Escutcheon Argent a Lion rampant within a Double Tressure flory counter-flory all within a Bordure Azure Supporters On either side a Lion proper crowned with an Antique Crown Or and gorged with a Chaplet of Oak leaves Vert fructed Gold with a Shield pendent from each, the dexter being charged with Argent a Saltire and Chief Gules on a Canton of the field a Lion rampant Azure for Bruce, and the sinister being charged with lozengy Argent and Gules for Fitzwilliam Motto Essayez (Try)

== Publications ==
- A Wandering Student in the Far East. 1904
- Lands of the Thunderbolt: Sikhim, Chumbi & Bhutan. Houghton Mifflin Company, Boston, 1923
- India: a Bird's-eye View. Constable, London, 1924
- The heart of Âryâvarta; a study of the psychology of Indian unrest. Constable, London, 1925
- The Life Of Lord Curzon. (3 vols). Ernest Benn Ltd, London, 1927–1928
- Essayez: The Memoirs of Lawrence. John Murray, London, 1956

== Book ==
- Jago, Michael Rab Butler: The Best Prime Minister We Never Had?, Biteback Publishing 2015 ISBN 978-1849549202

Parliament of the United Kingdom
Preceded by Charles Balfour	Member of Parliament for Hornsey; 1907–1916	Succeeded by Kennedy Jones
Political offices
Preceded by The Lord Carmichael	Governor of Fort William; 1917–1922	Succeeded by The Earl of Lytton
Preceded by Sir Samuel Hoare, Bt	Secretary of State for India; 1935–1937	Succeeded by Secretary of State for India and Burma
Preceded by New office	Secretary of State for India and Burma; 1937–1940	Succeeded by Leo Amery
Honorary titles
Preceded by The Lord Bolton	Lord Lieutenant of the North Riding of Yorkshire; 1945–1951	Succeeded by Sir William Worsley, Bt
Peerage of the United Kingdom
Preceded by Lawrence Dundas	Marquess of Zetland; 1929–1961	Succeeded by Lawrence Aldred Mervyn Dundas
