= Euan Wallace =

British politician

Captain The Right Honourable Euan Wallace MC
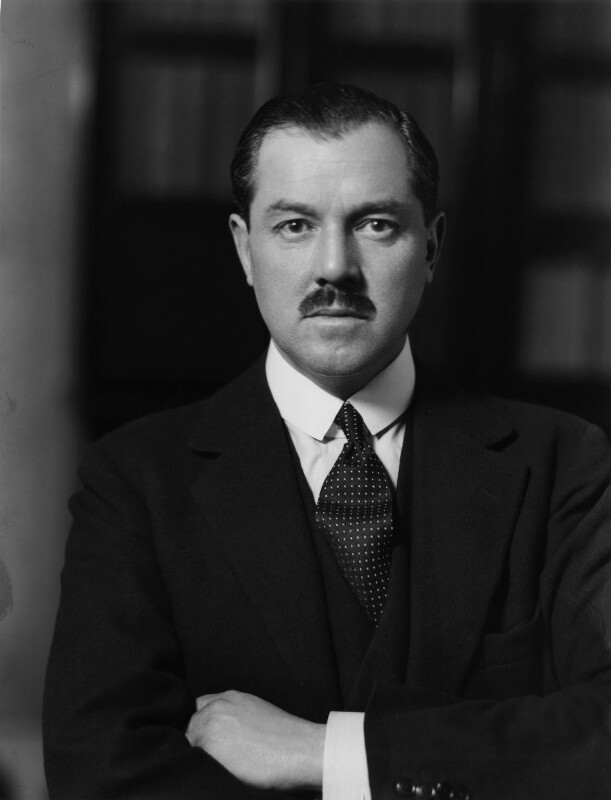

Minister of Transport
- In office 21 April 1939 – 10 May 1940
- Prime Minister: Neville Chamberlain
- Preceded by: Leslie Burgin
- Succeeded by: Sir John Reith

Financial Secretary to the Treasury
- In office 16 May 1938 – 21 April 1939
- Prime Minister: Neville Chamberlain
- Preceded by: John Colville
- Succeeded by: Harry Crookshank

Parliamentary Secretary to the Board of Trade
- In office 28 May 1937 – 16 May 1938
- Prime Minister: Neville Chamberlain
- Preceded by: Leslie Burgin
- Succeeded by: Ronald Cross

Secretary for Overseas Trade
- In office 28 November 1935 – 28 May 1937
- Prime Minister: Stanley Baldwin
- Preceded by: John Colville
- Succeeded by: Robert Hudson

Parliamentary Under-Secretary of State for the Home Department
- In office 18 June 1935 – 28 November 1935
- Prime Minister: Stanley Baldwin
- Preceded by: Harry Crookshank
- Succeeded by: Geoffrey Lloyd

Civil Lord of the Admiralty
- In office 10 November 1931 – 7 June 1935
- Prime Minister: Ramsay MacDonald
- Preceded by: George Hall
- Succeeded by: Kenneth Lindsay

Personal details
- Born: David Euan Wallace; 20 April 1892 Westminster, London
- Died: 9 February 1941 (aged 48) Greater London
- Party: Conservative
- Spouses: Lady Idina Sackville (m. 1913; div. 1919) Barbara Lutyens (m. 1920)
- Children: 5
- Parent: John Wallace
- Education: Harrow School
- Alma mater: Royal Military College, Sandhurst

David Euan Wallace, MC PC (20 April 1892 – 9 February 1941) was a British Conservative politician who was an ally of Neville Chamberlain and briefly served as Minister of Transport during World War II.

== Early life ==
Wallace was born on 20 April 1892. He was the son of John Wallace, of Glassingall, Dunblane, Perthshire. His paternal grandparents were David Wallace, an ironmaster, and Janet (née Weir) Wallace. His aunt, Edith Wallace, was the wife of Maj. Robert Dunbar Sinclair-Wemyss.

He was educated at Harrow before attending the Royal Military College, Sandhurst.

== Career ==
In 1911, Wallace joined the 2nd Regiment of Life Guards Reserve, gaining the rank of Captain, serving as adjutant from 1915 to 1918. He was decorated with the award of the Military Cross (MC) after being wounded four times during the Great War.

After the War, he became assistant Military Attaché at the British Embassy in Washington, D.C. He acted as a special Commissioner for the North-East coast and acted as aide-de-camp to the Governor General of Canada in 1920.

=== Political career ===
He was first elected to the House of Commons at Member of Parliament (MP) for Rugby from 1922 to 1923, then represented Hornsey from 1924 until his death in 1941 (when he was considered one of the richest members of the House of Commons). He served as Assistant Government Whip from 1928 to 1929; Junior Lord of the Treasury in 1929 and 1931; Civil Lord of the Admiralty from 1931 to 1934; Under-Secretary of State for the Home Department from 1935 to 1935; Secretary for Overseas Trade from 1935 to 1937; Parliamentary Secretary to the Board of Trade from 1937 to 1938; Financial Secretary to the Treasury from 1938 to 1939. On 21 April 1939, Prime Minister Neville Chamberlain appointed Wallace the Minister of Transport.

Wallace was invested as a Privy Counsellor by King Edward VIII in June 1936, along with Lt.-Col. David John Colville (Parliamentary Under-Secretary of State for Scotland) and, his former brother-in-law, Herbrand Sackville, 9th Earl De La Warr (Parliamentary Secretary to the Board of Education).

== Personal life ==
Wallace was twice married and the father of five sons, four of whom died while serving in the military. On 26 November 1913 Wallace married Lady (Myra) Idina Sackville, daughter of The 8th Earl De La Warr and Lady Muriel Agnes Brassey. Lady Idina designed Kildonan House in Barrhill, South Ayrshire with the architect James Miller in homage to her childhood home, but they separated before it was completed. Before the marriage ended in divorce in 1919, they were the parents of two sons:

- David John Wallace MC (1914–1944), a Major in the King's Royal Rifle Corps who was killed in action during World War II while serving with the Special Operations Executive in Greece (during the Battle of Menina) and who married Joan Prudence Magor, a daughter of Richard Magor of Chelmsford, in 1939.
- Gerard Euan Wallace (1915–1943), a Wing Commander in the Royal Air Force Volunteer Reserve who was killed in a flying accident in Kenya in August 1943, aged 27 and who married Mary Elizabeth Koch de Gooreynd, née Lawson, in November 1940.

On 10 May 1920, he was married to Barbara Lutyens (1898–1981), the daughter of architect Sir Edwin Lutyens and Lady Emily Bulwer-Lytton (a daughter of Edith Villiers and The 1st Earl of Lytton, the Viceroy of India and British Ambassador to France). Together, they were the parents of three sons:

- John Wallace (1922–1946), a Lieutenant in the Life Guards who died, unmarried, as a result of a general anaesthetic during a nose operation, while on active service.
- Edward Peter Wallace DFC (1923–1944), a Flight Lieutenant in the Royal Air Force Volunteer Reserve who was killed in action during World War II. He was unmarried.
- William Euan "Billy" Wallace (1927–1977), who was educated at Eton and University College, Oxford, and was a former escort of Princess Margaret, whom he had known since childhood. He married the Hon. Elizabeth Anne Hoyer Millar, daughter of The 1st Baron Inchyra and Anna de Marees van Swinderen (the daughter of Dutch diplomat René de Marees van Swinderen), in 1965. Princess Margaret, by then married to Antony Armstrong-Jones, attended the wedding.

He inherited a coal and iron fortune estimated at more than £2,000,000.

After undergoing a serious operation before Christmas 1940, Wallace died on 9 February 1941. His widow, who married Herbert Agar (the American journalist who was editor of the Louisville Courier-Journal) in 1945, lived another forty years before her death in 1981.

=== Descendants ===
Through his eldest son David, he was a grandfather of two: Laura Jacqueline Wallace (b. 1941), who married Dominic Paul Morland (a son of Sir Oscar Charles Morland GBE KCMG, of Pickering, Yorkshire and Alice Lindley) in 1963, they divorced and she married, secondly, Keith Fitchett, in 2003; and Cary Davina Wallace (b. 1942), who married David Howell, Baron Howell of Guildford.

Parliament of the United Kingdom
| Preceded by Sir John Baird, Bt | Member of Parliament for Rugby; 1922–1923 | Succeeded by Ernest Brown |
| Preceded by Viscount Ednam | Member of Parliament for Hornsey; 1924–1941 | Succeeded by Sir David Gammans |
Political offices
| Preceded by George Hall | Civil Lord of the Admiralty; 1931–1935 | Succeeded by Kenneth Lindsay |
| Preceded by Harry Crookshank | Under-Secretary of State for the Home Department; 1935–1936 | Succeeded by Geoffrey Lloyd |
| Preceded by John Colville | Secretary for Overseas Trade; 1935–1937 | Succeeded by Robert Hudson |
| Preceded by Leslie Burgin | Parliamentary Secretary to the Board of Trade; 1937–1938 | Succeeded by Ronald Cross |
| Preceded by John Colville | Financial Secretary to the Treasury; 1938–1939 | Succeeded by Harry Crookshank |
| Preceded by Leslie Burgin | Minister of Transport; 1939–1940 | Succeeded by Sir John Reith |
