= Secretary for Overseas Trade =

1917-1953 junior ministerial position in the United Kingdom

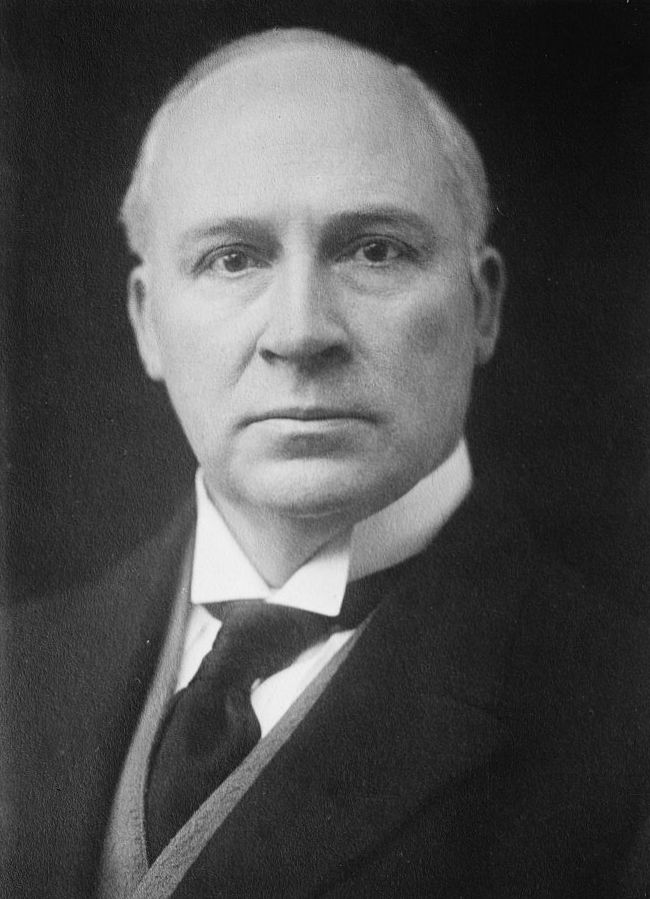
Sir Hamar Greenwood, Bt, later Viscount Greenwood, who served as Secretary for Overseas Trade between 1919 and 1920.

The Secretary for Overseas Trade was a junior Ministerial position in the United Kingdom government from 1917 until 1953, subordinate to the President of the Board of Trade. The office was replaced by the Minister of State for Trade on 3 September 1953.

== Secretaries for Overseas Trade, 1917-1953 ==
Name	Entered office	Left office
Sir Arthur Steel-Maitland, 1st Baronet	1917	1919
Sir Hamar Greenwood, 1st Baronet	1919	1920
F. G. Kellaway	1920	1921
Sir Philip Lloyd-Greame	1921	1922
Sir William Joynson-Hicks, 1st Baronet	1922	March 1923
Albert Buckley	March 1923	November 1923
Vacant	November 1923	1924
William Lunn	1924	1924
Arthur Samuel	1924	1927
Douglas Hacking	1927	1929
George Gillett	1929	1931
Sir Hilton Young	1931	1931
John Colville	1931	1935
Euan Wallace	1935	1937
Robert Hudson	1937	1940
Geoffrey Shakespeare	1940	1940
Harcourt Johnstone	1940	1945
Spencer Summers	1945	1945
Hilary Marquand	1945	1947
Harold Wilson	1947	1947
Arthur Bottomley	1947	1951
Henry Hopkinson	1951	1952
Harry Mackeson	1952	3 September 1953
