= Parliamentary Secretary to the Board of Trade =

The parliamentary secretary to the Board of Trade in the United Kingdom was a member of Parliament assigned to assist the Board of Trade and its President with administration and liaison with Parliament. It replaced the Vice-President of the Board of Trade.

From September 1953, a more senior ministerial post, the Minister of State for Trade also existed. At times, the parliamentary secretary post was then filled by a member of the House of Lords.

On 20 October 1970, the Board of Trade was merged with the Ministry of Technology to create the modern Department of Trade and Industry. The role of parliamentary secretary to the Board of Trade therefore ceased to have practical application beyond that date, with Anthony Grant serving as the final holder of the post. The closest successor can be found in the role of parliamentary secretary to the Department of Trade and Industry.

== Past parliamentary secretaries to the Board of Trade ==
- 1868–1871 George Shaw-Lefevre
- 1871–1874 Arthur Wellesley Peel
- 1874–1875 George Cavendish-Bentinck
- 1875–1878 Edward Stanhope
- 1878–1880 John Gilbert Talbot
- 1880–1882 Evelyn Ashley
- 1882–1885 John Holms
- 1885–1888 Baron Henry de Worms
- 1888–1889 William Onslow, 4th Earl of Onslow
- 1889–1892 Alexander Bruce, 6th Lord Balfour of Burleigh
- 1892–1895 Thomas Burt
- 1895–1902 William Ward, 2nd Earl of Dudley
- 1902–1905 Bonar Law
- 1905-1909 Hudson Kearley
- 1909–1911 Harold Tennant
- 1911–1915 John M. Robertson
- 1915–1916 E. G. Pretyman
- 1916–1917 George Henry Roberts
- 1917–1919 George Wardle
- 1919–1920 William Bridgeman
- 1920–1921 Philip Lloyd-Graeme
- 1921–1922 William Mitchell-Thomson
- 1922–1924 Roundell Palmer, Viscount Wolmer
- 1924-1924 A. V. Alexander
- 1924–1928 Sir Robert Burton-Chadwick
- 1928–1929 Herbert Williams
- 1929–1931 Walter Robert Smith
- 1931-1931 Gwilym Lloyd George
- 1931–1932 Leslie Hore-Belisha
- 1931–1937 Leslie Burgin
- 1937–1938 Euan Wallace
- 1938–1939 Ronald Cross
- 1939–1941 Gwilym Lloyd George
- 1941–1945 Charles Waterhouse
- 1945–1946 Ellis Smith
- 1946–1949 John Belcher
- 1949–1950 John Edwards
- 1950–1951 Hervey Rhodes
- 1951–1955 Henry Strauss
- 1955-1955 Donald Kaberry
- 1955–1956 Derek Walker-Smith
- 1956–1958 Frederick Erroll
- 1958–1960 John Rodgers
- 1960–1962 Niall Macpherson
- 1962–1964 David Price
- 1964–1967 Hervey Rhodes, Baron Rhodes
- 1967-1967 Henry Walston, Baron Walston
- 1967–1970 Gwyneth Dunwoody
- 1970 Anthony Grant
