= Leslie Burgin =

British politician (1887–1945)

The Right Honourable Leslie Burgin
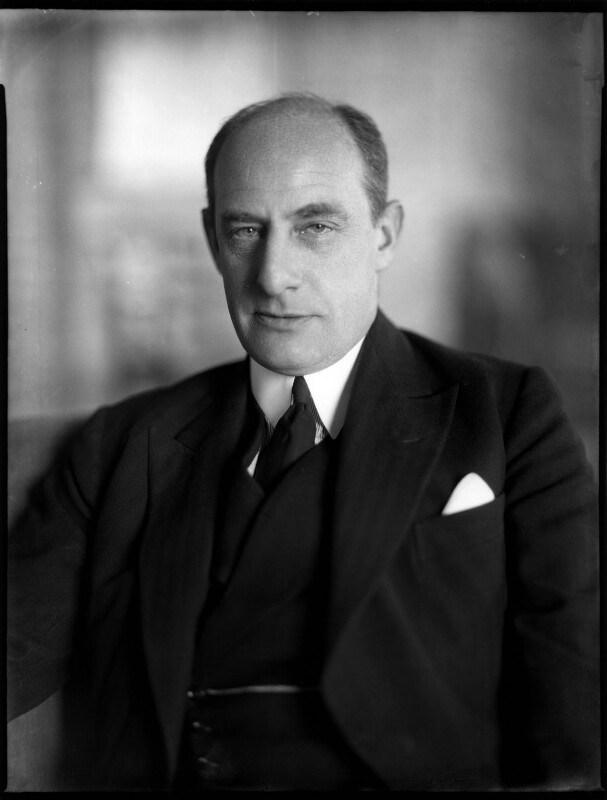

Member of Parliament for Luton
- In office 30 May 1929 – 15 June 1945
- Preceded by: Terence O'Connor
- Succeeded by: William Warbey

Personal details
- Born: 13 July 1887
- Died: 16 August 1945 (aged 58)
- Party: Liberal National (1931-1945); Liberal (before 1931)

Edward Leslie Burgin (13 July 1887 – 16 August 1945) was a British Liberal and later Liberal National politician in the 1930s.

== Biography ==
Born to Edward Lambert Burgin, a solicitor, Burgin studied law at the University of London, graduating with a first-class LL.B. in 1908 and a LL.D. in 1913.

Burgin trained as a solicitor specialising in international law and served as principal and director of legal studies to the Law Society. He contested Hornsey four times and East Ham North once, without success.

In the 1929 general election Burgin was elected as Liberal Member of Parliament (MP) for Luton. Along with some other Liberal MPs he joined the Liberal Nationals in 1931 and was made a Charity Commissioner. In 1932 he was appointed Parliamentary Secretary to the Board of Trade. He was appointed to the Privy Council in the 1937 Coronation Honours.

In 1937 Prime Minister Neville Chamberlain appointed Burgin as Minister of Transport. Two years later he was appointed as the first Minister of Supply in April 1939. As the post had not yet been established in law, he formally served as Minister without Portfolio for the first three months. His appointment was aimed to appeal to liberal minded opinion but was criticised as being inappropriate - A.J.P. Taylor described Burgin as being "another horse from Caligula's well-stocked stables" (a follow-up to contemporary remarks about the earlier appointment of Sir Thomas Inskip as Minister for Coordination of Defence). When Chamberlain was replaced by Winston Churchill, Burgin was not included in the new wartime ministry.

Burgin was referred to in the book Guilty Men (1940) by Michael Foot, Frank Owen and Peter Howard (writing under the pseudonym 'Cato'), an attack on public figures for their failure to re-arm and their appeasement of Nazi Germany.

He retired at the 1945 general election before dying in August 1945, aged 58.

Parliament of the United Kingdom
Preceded by Terence O'Connor	Member of Parliament for Luton; 1929–1945	Succeeded by William Warbey
Political offices
Preceded by Leslie Hore-Belisha	Minister of Transport; 1937–1939	Succeeded by Euan Wallace
New title	Minister of Supply; 1939–1940	Succeeded by Herbert Morrison
