= List of United Kingdom by-elections (1950–1979) =

This is a list of parliamentary by-elections in the United Kingdom, with the names of the incumbent and victor and their respective parties. Where seats changed political party at the election, the result is highlighted: red for a Labour gain, blue for a Conservative gain, orange for a Liberal gain, yellow for an SNP gain, green for a Plaid Cymru gain and grey for any other gain.

== Resignations ==
See Resignation from the House of Commons of the United Kingdom for more details.

Where the cause of by-election is given as "resignation" or "seeks re-election", this indicates that the incumbent was appointed on his or her own request to an "office of profit under the Crown", either the Steward of the Chiltern Hundreds or the Steward of the Manor of Northstead. These appointments are made as a constitutional device for leaving the House of Commons, whose Members are not permitted to resign.

== By-elections ==
=== October 1974–1979 Parliament ===
By-election	Date	Incumbent	Party	Winner	Party	Cause
Liverpool Edge Hill	29 March 1979 (Note: Gain retained at the 1979 general election.)	Sir Arthur Irvine	Labour	David Alton	Liberal	Death
Knutsford	1 March 1979	John Davies	Conservative	Jock Bruce-Gardyne	Conservative	Resignation on medical advice
Clitheroe	1 March 1979	David Walder	Conservative	David Waddington	Conservative	Death
Pontefract and Castleford	26 October 1978	Joe Harper	Labour	Geoffrey Lofthouse	Labour	Death
Berwick and East Lothian	26 October 1978	John Mackintosh	Labour	John Home Robertson	Labour	Death
Penistone	13 July 1978	John Mendelson	Labour	Allen McKay	Labour	Death
Manchester Moss Side	13 July 1978	Frank Hatton	Labour	George Morton	Labour	Death
Hamilton	31 May 1978	Alexander Wilson	Labour	George Robertson	Labour	Death
Wycombe	27 April 1978	Sir John Hall	Conservative	Ray Whitney	Conservative	Death
Epsom and Ewell	27 April 1978	Peter Rawlinson	Conservative	Archie Hamilton	Conservative	Life peerage
Lambeth Central	20 April 1978	Marcus Lipton	Labour	John Tilley	Labour	Death
Glasgow Garscadden	13 April 1978	William Small	Labour	Donald Dewar	Labour	Death
Ilford North	2 March 1978	Millie Miller	Labour	Vivian Bendall	Conservative	Death
Bournemouth East	24 November 1977	John Cordle	Conservative	David Atkinson	Conservative	Resignation: found in contempt of the House
Birmingham Ladywood	18 August 1977	Brian Walden	Labour	John Sever	Labour	Appointment as presenter of LWT programme Weekend World
Saffron Walden	7 July 1977	Sir Peter Kirk	Conservative	Alan Haselhurst	Conservative	Death
Grimsby	28 April 1977	Anthony Crosland	Labour	Austin Mitchell	Labour	Death
Ashfield	28 April 1977 (Note: Gain not retained at the 1979 UK general election.)	David Marquand	Labour	Tim Smith	Conservative	New career as Chief of Staff to Roy Jenkins
Birmingham Stechford	31 March 1977	Roy Jenkins	Labour	Andrew MacKay	Conservative	President of the European Commission
City of London and Westminster South	24 February 1977	Christopher Tugendhat	Conservative	Peter Brooke	Conservative	European Commissioner
Cambridge	2 December 1976	David Lane	Conservative	Robert Rhodes James	Conservative	New career as chairman for the Commission for Racial Equality
Workington	4 November 1976	Fred Peart	Labour	Richard Page	Conservative	Life peerage on appointment as Leader of the House of Lords
Walsall North	4 November 1976	John Stonehouse	Labour/English National	Robin Hodgson	Conservative	Resignation (convicted of insurance fraud)
Newcastle-upon-Tyne Central	4 November 1976	Edward Short	Labour	Harry Cowans	Labour	New career as chairman of Cable & Wireless
Thurrock	15 July 1976	Hugh Delargy	Labour	Oonagh McDonald	Labour	Death
Rotherham	24 June 1976	Brian O'Malley	Labour	Stanley Crowther	Labour	Death
Wirral	11 March 1976	Selwyn Lloyd	Speaker	David Hunt	Conservative	Life peerage
Carshalton	11 March 1976	Robert Carr	Conservative	Nigel Forman	Conservative	Life peerage
Coventry North West	4 March 1976	Maurice Edelman	Labour	Geoffrey Robinson	Labour	Death
Woolwich West	26 June 1975	William Hamling	Labour	Peter Bottomley	Conservative	Death
=== February–October 1974 Parliament ===
By-election	Date	Incumbent	Party	Winner	Party	Cause
Newham South	23 May 1974	Sir Elwyn Jones	Labour	Nigel Spearing	Labour	Appointed Lord Chancellor
=== 1970 – February 1974 Parliament ===
By-election	Date	Incumbent	Party	Winner	Party	Cause
Hove	8 November 1973	Martin Maddan	Conservative	Timothy Sainsbury	Conservative	Death
Glasgow Govan	8 November 1973 (Note: Gain not retained at the February 1974 general election.)	John Rankin	Labour	Margo MacDonald	SNP	Death
Edinburgh North	8 November 1973	Earl of Dalkeith	Conservative	Alexander Fletcher	Conservative	Succession to the Peerage
Berwick-upon-Tweed	8 November 1973 (Note: Gain retained at the February 1974 UK general election.)	Antony Lambton	Conservative	Alan Beith	Liberal	Resignation (scandal)
Ripon	26 July 1973	Malcolm Stoddart-Scott	Conservative	David Austick	Liberal	Death
Isle of Ely	26 July 1973	Harry Legge-Bourke	Conservative	Clement Freud	Liberal	Death
Manchester Exchange	27 June 1973	William Griffiths	Labour	Frank Hatton	Labour	Death
Westhoughton	24 May 1973	Tom Price	Labour	Roger Stott	Labour	Death
West Bromwich	24 May 1973	Maurice Foley	Labour	Betty Boothroyd	Labour	Appointment to the European Commission staff
Lincoln	1 March 1973	Dick Taverne	Labour/Democratic Labour	Dick Taverne	Democratic Labour	Sought re-election upon change of party allegiance
Dundee East	1 March 1973 (Note: George Machin retained the seat for Labour in the by-election but lost it to the SNP in the February 1974 UK general election.)	George Thomson	Labour	George Machin	Labour	Appointment as European Commissioner
Chester-le-Street	1 March 1973	Norman Pentland	Labour	Giles Radice	Labour	Death
Uxbridge	7 December 1972	Charles Curran	Conservative	Michael Shersby	Conservative	Death
Sutton and Cheam	7 December 1972	Richard Sharples	Conservative	Graham Tope	Liberal	Governor of Bermuda
Rochdale	26 October 1972	Jack McCann	Labour	Cyril Smith	Liberal	Death
Southwark	4 May 1972	Ray Gunter	Labour/Independent Labour	Harry Lamborn	Labour	Resignation (dispute with party)
Kingston-upon-Thames	4 May 1972	John Boyd-Carpenter	Conservative	Norman Lamont	Conservative	Chairman of Civil Aviation Authority
Merthyr Tydfil	13 April 1972	S. O. Davies	Independent Labour	Edward Rowlands	Labour	Death
Macclesfield	30 September 1971	Sir Arthur Vere Harvey	Conservative	Nicholas Winterton	Conservative	Life peerage
Widnes	23 September 1971	James MacColl	Labour	Gordon Oakes	Labour	Death
Stirling and Falkirk	16 September 1971	Malcolm Macpherson	Labour	Harry Ewing	Labour	Death
Greenwich	8 July 1971	Richard Marsh	Labour	Guy Barnett	Labour	Chairman of British Rail
Hayes and Harlington	17 June 1971	Arthur Skeffington	Labour	Neville Sandelson	Labour	Death
Goole	27 May 1971	George Jeger	Labour	Edmund Marshall	Labour	Death
Bromsgrove	27 May 1971	James Dance	Conservative	Terry Davis	Labour	Death
Southampton Itchen	27 May 1971	Horace King	Speaker	Bob Mitchell	Labour	Life peerage
Arundel and Shoreham	1 April 1971	Henry Kerby	Conservative	Richard Luce	Conservative	Death
Liverpool Scotland	1 April 1971	Walter Alldritt	Labour	Frank Marsden	Labour	Resignation
Enfield West	19 November 1970	Iain Macleod	Conservative	Cecil Parkinson	Conservative	Death
St Marylebone	22 October 1970	Quintin Hogg	Conservative	Kenneth Baker	Conservative	Appointed Lord Chancellor
=== 1966–1970 Parliament ===
By-election	Date	Incumbent	Party	Winner	Party	Cause
South Ayrshire	19 March 1970	Emrys Hughes	Labour	James Sillars	Labour	Death
Bridgwater	12 March 1970	Gerald Wills	Conservative	Tom King	Conservative	Death
Wellingborough	4 December 1969 (Note: Gain retained at the 1970 general election.)	Harry Howarth	Labour	Peter Fry	Conservative	Death
Louth	4 December 1969	Sir Cyril Osborne	Conservative	Jeffrey Archer	Conservative	Death
Swindon	30 October 1969 (Note: Gain not retained at the 1970 UK general election.)	Francis Noel-Baker	Labour	Christopher Ward	Conservative	Resignation
Paddington North	30 October 1969	Ben Parkin	Labour	Arthur Latham	Labour	Death
Newcastle-under-Lyme	30 October 1969	Stephen Swingler	Labour	John Golding	Labour	Death
Islington North	30 October 1969	Gerald Reynolds	Labour	Michael O'Halloran	Labour	Death
Glasgow Gorbals	30 October 1969	Alice Cullen	Labour	Frank McElhone	Labour	Death
Birmingham Ladywood	26 June 1969	Victor Yates	Labour	Wallace Lawler	Liberal	Death
Chichester	22 May 1969	Walter Loveys	Conservative	Christopher Chataway	Conservative	Death
Mid Ulster	17 April 1969	George Forrest	UUP	Bernadette Devlin	Unity	Death
Weston-super-Mare	27 March 1969	David Webster	Conservative	Jerry Wiggin	Conservative	Death
Walthamstow East	27 March 1969	William Robinson	Labour	Michael McNair-Wilson	Conservative	Death
Brighton Pavilion	27 March 1969	Sir William Teeling	Conservative	Julian Amery	Conservative	Resignation
New Forest	7 November 1968	Oliver Crosthwaite-Eyre	Conservative	Patrick McNair-Wilson	Conservative	Resignation
Bassetlaw	31 October 1968	Frederick Bellenger	Labour	Joseph Ashton	Labour	Death
Caerphilly	18 July 1968	Ness Edwards	Labour	Alfred Evans	Labour	Death
Nelson and Colne	27 June 1968	Sydney Silverman	Labour	David Waddington	Conservative	Death
Sheffield Brightside	13 June 1968	Richard Winterbottom	Labour	Edward Griffiths	Labour	Death
Oldham West	13 June 1968	Leslie Hale	Labour	Bruce Campbell	Conservative	Resignation
Warwick and Leamington	28 March 1968	John Hobson	Conservative	Dudley Smith	Conservative	Death
Meriden	28 March 1968	Christopher Rowland	Labour	Keith Speed	Conservative	Death
Dudley	28 March 1968	George Wigg	Labour	Donald Williams	Conservative	Life peerage on appointment as chairman of Horserace Betting Levy Board
Acton	28 March 1968	Bernard Floud	Labour	Kenneth Baker	Conservative	Death (suicide)
Kensington South	14 March 1968	William Roots	Conservative	Sir Brandon Rhys Williams	Conservative	Resignation (ill-health?)
Derbyshire West	23 November 1967	Aidan Crawley	Conservative	James Scott-Hopkins	Conservative	Appointment as chairman of London Weekend Television
Manchester Gorton	2 November 1967	Konni Zilliacus	Labour	Kenneth Marks	Labour	Death
Leicester South West	2 November 1967	Herbert Bowden	Labour	Thomas Boardman	Conservative	Appointment as chairman of Independent Television Authority
Hamilton	2 November 1967	Thomas Fraser	Labour	Winifred Ewing	SNP	Appointment to North Scotland Hydro-Electricity Board
Walthamstow West	21 September 1967	Edward Redhead	Labour	Frederick Silvester	Conservative	Death
Cambridge	21 September 1967	Robert Davies	Labour	David Lane	Conservative	Death
Brierley Hill	27 April 1967	John Talbot	Conservative	Fergus Montgomery	Conservative	Death
Honiton	16 March 1967	Robert Mathew	Conservative	Peter Emery	Conservative	Death
Rhondda West	9 March 1967	Iorwerth Thomas	Labour	Alec Jones	Labour	Death
Nuneaton	9 March 1967	Frank Cousins	Labour	Leslie Huckfield	Labour	Resignation
Glasgow Pollok	9 March 1967	Alexander Garrow	Labour	Esmond Wright	Conservative	Death
Carmarthen	14 July 1966	Megan Lloyd George	Labour	Gwynfor Evans	Plaid Cymru	Death
=== 1964–1966 Parliament ===
By-election	Date	Incumbent	Party	Winner	Party	Cause
Kingston upon Hull North	27 January 1966	Henry Solomons	Labour	Kevin McNamara	Labour	Death
Erith and Crayford	11 November 1965	Norman Dodds	Labour	James Wellbeloved	Labour	Death
Cities of London and Westminster	4 November 1965	Sir Harry Hylton-Foster	Speaker	John Smith	Conservative	Death
Hove	22 July 1965	Anthony Marlowe	Conservative	Martin Maddan	Conservative	Resignation (ill-health)
Birmingham Hall Green	6 May 1965	Aubrey Jones	Conservative	Reginald Eyre	Conservative	Appointment as chairman of National Board for Prices and Incomes
Abertillery	1 April 1965	Llywelyn Williams	Labour	Clifford Williams	Labour	Death
Roxburgh, Selkirk and Peebles	24 March 1965 (Note: Gain retained at the 1966 general election.)	Charles Donaldson	Conservative	David Steel	Liberal	Death
Saffron Walden	23 March 1965	R. A. Butler	Conservative	Peter Kirk	Conservative	Life peerage
Salisbury	4 February 1965	John Morrison	Conservative	Michael Hamilton	Conservative	Hereditary peerage
East Grinstead	4 February 1965	Evelyn Emmet	Conservative	Geoffrey Johnson Smith	Conservative	Life peerage
Altrincham and Sale	4 February 1965	Fred Erroll	Conservative	Anthony Barber	Conservative	Hereditary peerage
Nuneaton	21 January 1965	Frank Bowles	Labour	Frank Cousins	Labour	Life peerage to provide seat for Minister of Technology Frank Cousins
Leyton	21 January 1965 (Note: Gain not retained at the 1966 UK general election.)	Reg Sorensen	Labour	Ronald Buxton	Conservative	Life peerage to provide seat for Foreign Secretary Patrick Gordon Walker
=== 1959–1964 Parliament ===
By-election	Date	Incumbent	Party	Winner	Party	Cause
Liverpool Scotland	11 June 1964	David Logan	Labour	Walter Alldritt	Labour	Death
Faversham	4 June 1964	Percy Wells	Labour	Terence Boston	Labour	Death
Winchester	14 May 1964	Peter Smithers	Conservative	Morgan Morgan-Giles	Conservative	Appointment as Secretary-General of Council of Europe
Rutherglen	14 May 1964 (Note: Gain retained at the 1964 general election.)	Richard Brooman-White	Conservative	Gregor Mackenzie	Labour	Death
Devizes	14 May 1964	Percivall Pott	Conservative	Charles Morrison	Conservative	Death
Bury St Edmunds	14 May 1964	Sir William Aitken	Conservative	Eldon Griffiths	Conservative	Death
Dumfriesshire	12 December 1963	Niall MacPherson	Conservative	David Anderson	Conservative	Hereditary peerage
Sudbury and Woodbridge	5 December 1963	John Hare	Conservative	Keith Stainton	Conservative	Hereditary peerage
St Marylebone	5 December 1963	Sir Wavell Wakefield	Conservative	Quintin Hogg	Conservative	Hereditary peerage
Manchester Openshaw	5 December 1963	William Williams	Labour	Charles Morris	Labour	Death
Dundee West	21 November 1963	John Strachey	Labour	Peter Doig	Labour	Death
Luton	7 November 1963	Dr. Charles Hill	Conservative	Will Howie	Labour	Life peerage on appointment as chairman of Independent Television Authority
Kinross and Western Perthshire	7 November 1963	Gilmour Leburn	Conservative	Sir Alec Douglas-Home	Conservative	Death
Belfast South	22 October 1963	Sir David Campbell	UUP	Rafton Pounder	UUP	Death
Bristol South East	20 August 1963 (Note: Tony Benn won the most votes but was disqualified by virtue of his Peerage; the Election Court declared Malcolm St Clair duly elected. St Clair undertook that if the law was changed to allow Benn to disclaim his hereditary peerage, he would resign and create a by-election. The law was changed by the Peerage Act 1963 and St Clair duly resigned, allowing Benn to return to the Commons in 1963.)	Malcolm St Clair	Conservative	Tony Benn	Labour	Resignation
Stratford	15 August 1963	John Profumo	Conservative	Angus Maude	Conservative	Resignation (lying to the House of Commons)
West Bromwich	4 July 1963	John Dugdale	Labour	Maurice Foley	Labour	Death
Deptford	4 July 1963	Sir Leslie Plummer	Labour	John Silkin	Labour	Death
Leeds South	20 June 1963	Hugh Gaitskell	Labour	Merlyn Rees	Labour	Death
Swansea East	28 March 1963	David Mort	Labour	Neil McBride	Labour	Death
Rotherham	28 March 1963	Jack Jones	Labour	Brian O'Malley	Labour	Death (road accident)
Colne Valley	21 March 1963	Glenvil Hall	Labour	Patrick Duffy	Labour	Death
Northamptonshire South	22 November 1962	Sir Reginald Manningham-Buller	Conservative	Arthur Jones	Conservative	Appointed Lord Chancellor
Norfolk Central	22 November 1962	Richard Collard	Conservative	Ian Gilmour	Conservative	Death
Glasgow Woodside	22 November 1962	William Grant	Conservative	Neil Carmichael	Labour	Appointment as Lord Justice Clerk
Dorset South	22 November 1962 (Note: Gain not retained at the 1964 UK general election.)	Viscount Hinchingbrooke	Conservative	Guy Barnett	Labour	Succession to peerage
Chippenham	22 November 1962	David Eccles	Conservative	Daniel Awdry	Conservative	Hereditary peerage
Leicester North East	12 July 1962	Sir Lynn Ungoed-Thomas	Labour	Tom Bradley	Labour	Appointment as High Court Judge
West Lothian	14 June 1962	John Taylor	Labour	Tam Dalyell	Labour	Death
West Derbyshire	6 June 1962	Edward Wakefield	Conservative	Aidan Crawley	Conservative	Appointment as Commissioner for Malta
Middlesbrough West	6 June 1962	Sir Jocelyn Simon	Conservative	Jeremy Bray	Labour	Appointment as President of Probate Division of the High Court
Montgomeryshire	15 May 1962	Clement Davies	Liberal	Emlyn Hooson	Liberal	Death
Derby North	17 April 1962	Clifford Wilcock	Labour	Niall MacDermot	Labour	Death
Stockton-on-Tees	5 April 1962	George Chetwynd	Labour	Bill Rodgers	Labour	Appointment as director of North-East Development Council
Pontefract	22 March 1962	George Sylvester	Labour	Joseph Harper	Labour	Death
Orpington	14 March 1962	Donald Sumner	Conservative	Eric Lubbock	Liberal	Appointment as County Court Judge
Middlesbrough East	14 March 1962	Hilary Marquand	Labour	Arthur Bottomley	Labour	Appointment as director of International Institute for Labour Studies, Geneva
Blackpool North	13 March 1962	Toby Low	Conservative	Norman Miscampbell	Conservative	Hereditary peerage
Lincoln	8 March 1962	Geoffrey de Freitas	Labour	Dick Taverne	Labour	Appointed as High Commissioner to Ghana
Glasgow Bridgeton	16 November 1961	James Carmichael	Labour	James Bennett	Labour	Resignation (ill-health?)
Oswestry	9 November 1961	David Ormsby-Gore	Conservative	John Biffen	Conservative	Appointment as Ambassador to the United States
East Fife	9 November 1961	Sir James Henderson-Stewart, Bt.	Conservative	Sir John E. Gilmour	Conservative	Death
Manchester Moss Side	7 November 1961	James Watts	Conservative	Frank Taylor	Conservative	Death
Bristol South East	4 May 1961	Tony Benn	Labour	Malcolm St Clair	Conservative	Succession to peerage
Warrington	20 April 1961	Dr Edith Summerskill	Labour	Thomas Williams	Labour	Life peerage
Paisley	20 April 1961	Douglas Johnston	Labour	John Robertson	Labour	Appointment to Court of Session
Birmingham Small Heath	23 March 1961	William Wheeldon	Labour	Denis Howell	Labour	Death
Worcester	16 March 1961	George Ward	Conservative	Peter Walker	Conservative	Hereditary peerage
High Peak	16 March 1961	Hugh Molson	Conservative	David Walder	Conservative	Life peerage
Colchester	16 March 1961	Cuthbert Alport	Conservative	Antony Buck	Conservative	Life peerage on appointment as High Commissioner to Rhodesia
Cambridgeshire	16 March 1961	Gerald Howard	Conservative	Francis Pym	Conservative	Appointment as High Court Judge
Blyth	24 November 1960	Alfred Robens	Labour	Eddie Milne	Labour	Appointment as chairman of National Coal Board
Ebbw Vale	17 November 1960	Aneurin Bevan	Labour	Michael Foot	Labour	Death
Tiverton	16 November 1960	Derick Heathcoat-Amory	Conservative	Robin Maxwell-Hyslop	Conservative	Hereditary peerage
Petersfield	16 November 1960	Hon. Peter Legh	Conservative	Joan Quennell	Conservative	Succession to peerage
Ludlow	16 November 1960	Christopher Holland-Martin	Conservative	Jasper More	Conservative	Death
Carshalton	16 November 1960	Antony Head	Conservative	Walter Elliot	Conservative	Hereditary peerage on appointment as High Commissioner to Nigeria
Bolton East	16 November 1960 (Note: Edwin Taylor retained the seat for the Conservatives in the by-election but lost it to Labour in the 1964 UK general election.)	Philip Bell	Conservative	Edwin Taylor	Conservative	Appointment as County Court Judge
Mid Bedfordshire	16 November 1960	Alan Lennox-Boyd	Conservative	Stephen Hastings	Conservative	Hereditary peerage
Edinburgh North	19 May 1960	William Rankine Milligan	Conservative	Earl of Dalkeith	Conservative	Appointment to Court of Session
Harrow West	17 March 1960	Sir Albert Braithwaite	Conservative	John Page	Conservative	Death (suicide)
Brighouse and Spenborough	17 March 1960 (Note: A rare occasion when an incumbent government gained a seat from the opposition in a by-election, although it was lost at the 1964 UK general election.)	Lewis John Edwards	Labour	Michael Shaw	Conservative	Death
=== 1955–1959 Parliament ===
By-election	Date	Incumbent	Party	Winner	Party	Cause
Whitehaven	18 June 1959	Frank Anderson	Labour	Joseph Symonds	Labour	Death
Penistone	11 June 1959	Henry McGhee	Labour	John Mendelson	Labour	Death
Galloway	9 April 1959	John Mackie	Conservative	John Brewis	Conservative	Death
South West Norfolk	25 March 1959	Sidney Dye	Labour	Albert Hilton	Labour	Death (road accident)
Harrow East	19 March 1959	Ian Harvey	Conservative	Anthony Courtney	Conservative	Resignation (scandal)
Belfast East	19 March 1959	Alan McKibbin	UUP	Stanley McMaster	UUP	Death
Southend West	29 January 1959	Sir Henry Channon	Conservative	Paul Channon	Conservative	Death
Shoreditch and Finsbury	27 November 1958	Victor Collins	Labour	Michael Cliffe	Labour	Elevation to a life peerage
East Aberdeenshire	20 November 1958	Sir Robert Boothby	Conservative	Patrick Wolrige-Gordon	Conservative	Elevation to a life peerage
Pontypool	10 November 1958	Granville West	Labour	Leo Abse	Labour	Elevation to a life peerage
Chichester	6 November 1958	Hon. Sir Lancelot Joynson-Hicks	Conservative	Walter Loveys	Conservative	Succession to the peerage
Morecambe and Lonsdale	6 November 1958	Sir Ian Fraser	Conservative	Basil de Ferranti	Conservative	Elevation to a life peerage
Argyll	12 June 1958	Sir Duncan McCallum	Conservative	Michael Noble	Conservative	Death
Weston-super-Mare	12 June 1958	Sir Ian Orr-Ewing	Conservative	David Webster	Conservative	Death
Wigan	12 June 1958	Ronald Williams	Labour	Alan Fitch	Labour	Death
St Helens	12 June 1958	Sir Hartley Shawcross	Labour	Leslie Spriggs	Labour	Resignation
Ealing South	12 June 1958	Angus Maude	Conservative	Brian Batsford	Conservative	Resignation
Islington North	15 May 1958	Wilfred Fienburgh	Labour	Gerald Reynolds	Labour	Death (road accident)
Torrington	27 March 1958 (Note: Gain not retained at the 1959 general election.)	George Lambert	National Liberal and Conservative	Mark Bonham-Carter	Liberal	Succession to peerage
Glasgow Kelvingrove	13 March 1958	Walter Elliot	Conservative	Mary McAlister	Labour	Death
Rochdale	12 February 1958 (Note: Gain retained at the 1959 UK general election.)	Wentworth Schofield	Conservative	Jack McCann	Labour	Death
Liverpool Garston	5 December 1957	Sir Victor Raikes	Conservative / Independent Conservative	Richard Bingham	Conservative	Resignation (dispute with party)
Leicester South-East	28 November 1957	Charles Waterhouse	Conservative	John Peel	Conservative	Resignation
Ipswich	24 October 1957	Richard Stokes	Labour	Dingle Foot	Labour	Death
Gloucester	12 September 1957	Moss Turner-Samuels	Labour	Jack Diamond	Labour	Death
North Dorset	27 June 1957	Robert Crouch	Conservative	Richard Glyn	Conservative	Death
Hornsey	30 May 1957	Sir David Gammans	Conservative	Lady Muriel Gammans	Conservative	Death
East Ham North	30 May 1957	Percy Daines	Labour	Reginald Prentice	Labour	Death
Edinburgh South	29 May 1957	Sir William Darling	Conservative	Michael Hutchison	Conservative	Resignation
Newcastle-upon-Tyne North	21 March 1957	Gwilym Lloyd George	National Liberal and Conservative	William Elliott	Conservative	Elevation to a hereditary peerage
Beckenham	21 March 1957	Patrick Buchan-Hepburn	Conservative	Philip Goodhart	Conservative	Elevation to a hereditary peerage
Warwick and Leamington	7 March 1957	Sir Anthony Eden	Conservative	John Hobson	Conservative	Resignation due to ill health
Bristol West	7 March 1957	Walter Monckton	Conservative	Robert Cooke	Conservative	Elevation to a hereditary peerage
Carmarthen	28 February 1957	Rhys Hopkin Morris	Liberal	Megan Lloyd George	Labour	Death
Wednesbury	28 February 1957	Stanley Evans	Labour	John Stonehouse	Labour	Resignation (disagreement with party over Suez)
Lewisham North	14 February 1957	Sir Austin Hudson, Bt.	Conservative	Niall MacDermot	Labour	Death
Melton	19 December 1956	Anthony Nutting	Conservative	Mervyn Pike	Conservative	Resignation (disagreement with party over Suez)
City of Chester	15 November 1956	Basil Nield	Conservative	John Temple	Conservative	Recorder of Manchester
Chester-le-Street	27 September 1956	Patrick Bartley	Labour	Norman Pentland	Labour	Death
Newport	6 July 1956	Peter Freeman	Labour	Sir Frank Soskice	Labour	Death
Tonbridge	7 June 1956	Gerald Williams	Conservative	Richard Hornby	Conservative	Resignation
Mid Ulster	8 May 1956 (Note: Tom Mitchell won the most votes in the 1955 general election but was disqualified by the House of Commons on the grounds that he was a convicted felon. A by-election was called at which Mitchell again stood and won the most votes. On this occasion an election petition was lodged and Mitchell was again disqualified with the Election Court declaring his opponent Charles Beattie duly elected. It was then discovered that Beattie was ineligible to sit because he held offices of profit under the Crown. Beattie was indemnified by Parliament against the consequences of sitting and voting while ineligible, and a further writ was moved. In the subsequent by-election Independent Unionist George Forrest gained more votes than Mitchell and duly took his seat. Subsequently Forrest took the Ulster Unionist whip and won the seat in his new party colours at the 1959 general election.)	Charles Beattie	UUP	George Forrest	Ind. Unionist	Disqualification
Walthamstow West	1 March 1956	Clement Attlee	Labour	Edward Redhead	Labour	Elevation to a hereditary peerage
Taunton	14 February 1956	Henry Hopkinson	Conservative	Edward du Cann	Conservative	Elevation to a hereditary peerage
Gainsborough	14 February 1956	Harry Crookshank	Conservative	Marcus Kimball	Conservative	Elevation to a hereditary peerage
Hereford	14 February 1956	James Thomas	Conservative	David Gibson-Watt	Conservative	Elevation to a hereditary peerage
Leeds North East	9 February 1956	Osbert Peake	Conservative	Sir Keith Joseph, Bt.	Conservative	Elevation to a hereditary peerage
Blaydon	2 February 1956	William Whiteley	Labour	Robert Woof	Labour	Death
Torquay	15 December 1955	Charles Williams	Conservative	Frederic Bennett	Conservative	Death
Greenock	8 December 1955	Hector McNeil	Labour	Dickson Mabon	Labour	Death
Gateshead West	7 December 1955	John Hall	Labour	Harry Randall	Labour	Death
Mid Ulster	11 August 1955	Tom Mitchell	Sinn Féin	Charles Beattie	UUP	Disqualification
=== 1951–1955 Parliament ===
By-election	Date	Incumbent	Party	Winner	Party	Cause
Wrexham	17 March 1955	Robert Richards	Labour	Idwal Jones	Labour	Death
Stockport South	3 February 1955	Arnold Gridley	Conservative	Harold Steward	Conservative	Elevation to a hereditary peerage
Edinburgh North	27 January 1955	James Clyde	Conservative	William Rankine Milligan	Conservative	Lord President, Court of Session
Twickenham	25 January 1955	Edward Keeling	Conservative	Roger Gresham Cooke	Conservative	Death
Orpington	20 January 1955	Waldron Smithers	Conservative	Donald Sumner	Conservative	Death
South Norfolk	13 January 1955	Peter Baker	Conservative	John Hill	Conservative	Expelled from the House (convicted of fraud)
Inverness	21 December 1954	Malcolm Douglas-Hamilton	Conservative	Neil McLean	Conservative	Resignation
Armagh	20 November 1954 (Note: An uncontested by-election.) (Note: The Armagh by-election was the last time to date when a UK Parliamentary election was uncontested.)	Richard Harden	UUP	Christopher Armstrong	UUP	Resignation
Liverpool West Derby	18 November 1954	Sir David Maxwell Fyfe	Conservative	John Woollam	Conservative	Appointed Lord Chancellor
Morpeth	4 November 1954	Robert Taylor	Labour	Will Owen	Labour	Death
Sutton and Cheam	4 November 1954	Sydney Marshall	Conservative	Richard Sharples	Conservative	Resignation
Aberdare	28 October 1954	David Thomas	Labour	Arthur Probert	Labour	Death
Aldershot	28 October 1954	Oliver Lyttelton	Conservative	Eric Errington	Conservative	Elevation to a hereditary peerage
Wakefield	21 October 1954	Arthur Greenwood	Labour	Arthur Creech Jones	Labour	Death
Shoreditch and Finsbury	21 October 1954	Ernest Thurtle	Labour	Victor Collins	Labour	Death
Croydon East	30 September 1954	Herbert Williams	Conservative	John Hughes-Hallett	Conservative	Death
Motherwell	14 April 1954	Alexander Anderson	Labour	George Lawson	Labour	Death
Edinburgh East	8 April 1954	John Wheatley	Labour	Eustace Willis	Labour	Judge, Court of Session
Harrogate	11 March 1954	Christopher York	Conservative	James Ramsden	Conservative	Resignation
Arundel and Shoreham	9 March 1954	William Cuthbert	Conservative	Henry Kerby	Conservative	Resignation
Bournemouth West	18 February 1954	Viscount Cranborne	Conservative	John Eden	Conservative	Resignation
Harwich	11 February 1954	Stanley Holmes	National Liberal and Conservative	Julian Ridsdale	National Liberal and Conservative	Elevation to a hereditary peerage
Haltemprice	11 February 1954	Richard Law	Conservative	Patrick Wall	Conservative	Elevation to a hereditary peerage
Ilford North	3 February 1954	Geoffrey Hutchinson	Conservative	Tom Iremonger	Conservative	Chairman, National Assistance Board
Paddington North	3 December 1953	William J. Field	Labour	Ben Parkin	Labour	Resignation (scandal)
Holborn and St Pancras South	19 November 1953	Santo Jeger	Labour	Lena Jeger	Labour	Death
Ormskirk	12 November 1953	Arthur Salter	Conservative	Douglas Glover	Conservative	Elevation to a hereditary peerage
Crosby	12 November 1953	Malcolm Bullock	Conservative	Graham Page	Conservative	Resignation
Broxtowe	17 September 1953	Seymour Cocks	Labour	William Warbey	Labour	Death
Birmingham Edgbaston	2 July 1953	Peter Bennett	Conservative	Edith Pitt	Conservative	Elevation to a hereditary peerage
Abingdon	30 June 1953	Ralph Glyn	Conservative	Airey Neave	Conservative	Elevation to a hereditary peerage
Sunderland South	13 May 1953 (Note: A rare occasion when an incumbent government gained a seat from the opposition in a by-election. The gain was held at the 1955 general election.)	Richard Ewart	Labour	Paul Williams	Conservative	Death
North Down	15 April 1953	Walter Smiles	UUP	Patricia Ford	UUP	Death (drowned in ferry disaster)
Hayes and Harlington	1 April 1953	Walter Ayles	Labour	Arthur Skeffington	Labour	Resignation
Stoke-on-Trent North	31 March 1953	Albert Davies	Labour	Harriet Slater	Labour	Death
Barnsley	31 March 1953	Sidney Schofield	Labour	Roy Mason	Labour	Resignation
Isle of Thanet	12 March 1953	Hon. Edward Carson	Conservative	William Rees-Davies	Conservative	Resignation
Canterbury	12 February 1953	John Baker White	Conservative	Leslie Thomas	Conservative	Resignation
Farnworth	27 November 1952	George Tomlinson	Labour	Ernest Thornton	Labour	Death
Birmingham Small Heath	27 November 1952	Fred Longden	Labour	William Wheeldon	Labour	Death
Belfast South	4 November 1952	Conolly Gage	UUP	David Campbell	UUP	Resignation
Wycombe	4 November 1952	Hon. William Astor	Conservative	John Hall	Conservative	Succession to the peerage
North Antrim	27 October 1952	Sir Hugh O'Neill	UUP	Phelim O'Neill	UUP	Resignation
Cleveland	23 October 1952	George Willey	Labour	Arthur Palmer	Labour	Death
Dundee East	17 July 1952	Thomas Cook	Labour	George Thomson	Labour	Death (road accident)
Leeds South East	7 February 1952	James Milner	Labour	Denis Healey	Labour	Elevation to a hereditary peerage
Southport	6 February 1952	Robert Hudson	Conservative	Roger Fleetwood-Hesketh	Conservative	Elevation to a hereditary peerage
Bournemouth East and Christchurch	6 February 1952	Brendan Bracken	Conservative	Nigel Nicolson	Conservative	Elevation to a hereditary peerage
=== 1950–1951 Parliament === No seats changed hands during this Parliament.
By-election	Date	Incumbent	Party	Winner	Party	Cause
Westhoughton	21 June 1951	Rhys Davies	Labour	Tom Price	Labour	Illness
Woolwich East	14 June 1951	Ernest Bevin	Labour	Christopher Mayhew	Labour	Death
Londonderry	19 May 1951 (Note: Uncontested by-election.)	Ronald Ross	UUP	William Wellwood	UUP	Appointment as Northern Ireland Government Agent in London
Harrow West	21 April 1951	Norman Bower	Conservative	Albert Braithwaite	Conservative	Resignation
Ormskirk	5 April 1951	Ronald Cross	Conservative	Arthur Salter	Conservative	Appointment as Governor of Tasmania
Bristol West	15 February 1951	Oliver Stanley	Conservative	Walter Monckton	Conservative	Death
Abertillery	30 November 1950	George Daggar	Labour	Llywelyn Williams	Labour	Death
Bristol South East	30 November 1950	Stafford Cripps	Labour	Tony Benn	Labour	Resignation (ill-health)
Belfast West	29 November 1950 (Note: MacManaway had been ordained a priest in the Church of Ireland in 1925. Before his candidature he sought legal advice and resigned all offices in the Church. However, after his election the Judicial Committee of the Privy Council determined him ineligible to sit, ruling that the House of Commons (Clergy Disqualification) Act 1801 disqualified him.)	James Godfrey MacManaway	UUP	Thomas Teevan	UUP	Disqualified
Birmingham Handsworth	16 November 1950	Harold Roberts	Conservative	Edward Boyle	Conservative	Death
Oxford	2 November 1950	Quintin Hogg	Conservative	Lawrence Turner	Conservative	Succession to the Peerage
Glasgow Scotstoun	25 October 1950	Sir Arthur Young, Bt	Conservative	James Hutchison	Conservative	Death
Leicester North East	28 September 1950	Terence Donovan	Labour	Lynn Ungoed-Thomas	Labour	Appointment as High Court Judge
Brighouse and Spenborough	4 May 1950	Frederick Cobb	Labour	John Edwards	Labour	Death
Dunbartonshire West	25 April 1950	Adam McKinlay	Labour	Tom Steele	Labour	Death
Sheffield Neepsend	5 April 1950	Harry Morris	Labour	Frank Soskice	Labour	Resignation to provide a seat for Solicitor General Frank Soskice

== See also ==
- United Kingdom by-election records
