= 1973 Chester-le-Street by-election =

← 1970	1 March 1973	Feb. 1974 →

Constituency of Chester-le-Street
- Turnout: 71.4% (▼2.3%)
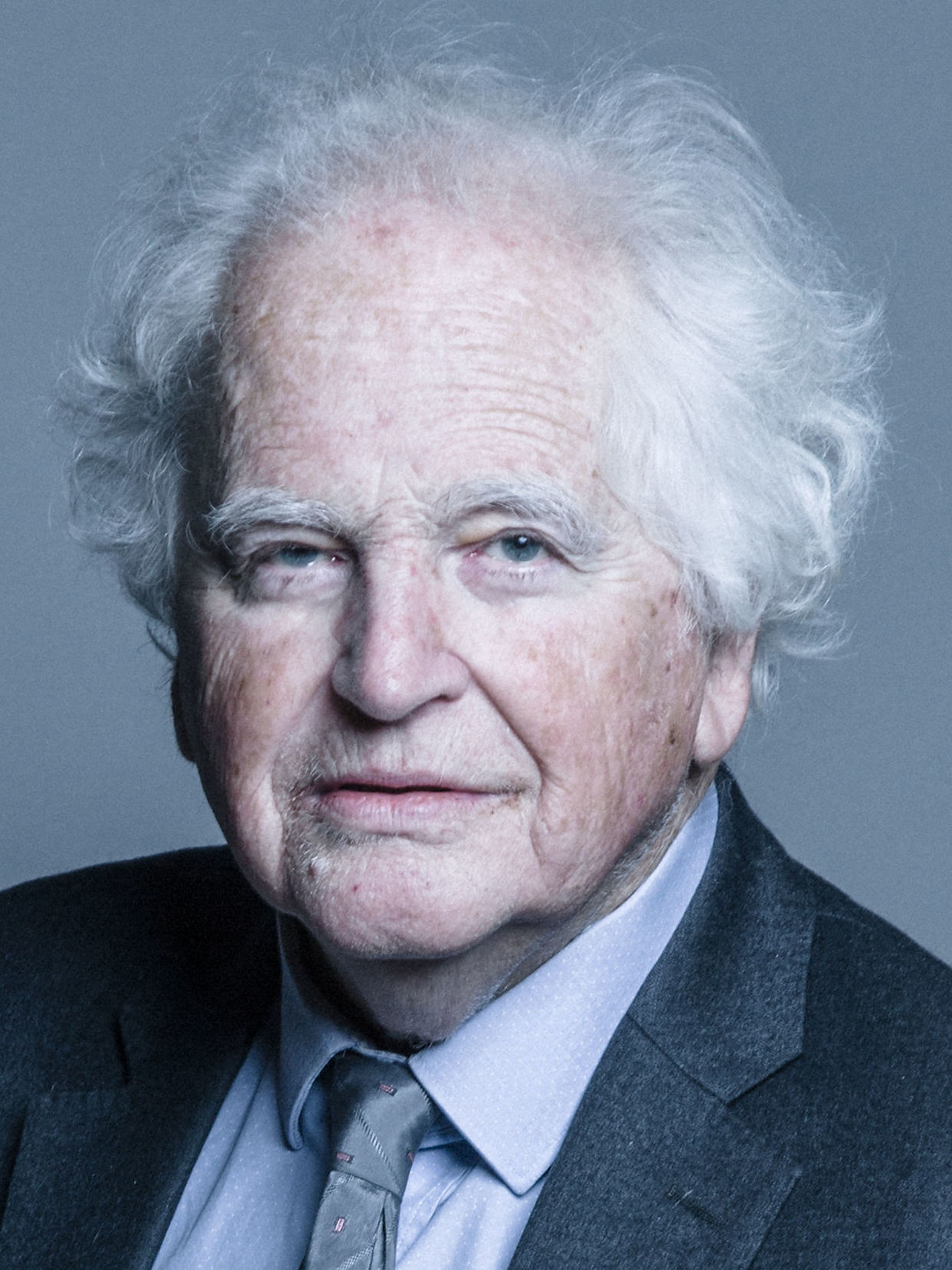
	First party	Second party	Third party
		Lib	Con
Candidate	Giles Radice	George Booth Suggett	Neil Balfour
Party	Labour	Liberal	Conservative
Popular vote	25,874	18,808	4,092
Percentage	53.06%	38.57%	8.39%
Swing	▼18.54%	New	▼20.01%
MP before election
Norman Pentland
Labour
Subsequent MP
Giles Radice
Labour

The 1973 Chester-le-Street by-election was a parliamentary by-election held for the British House of Commons constituency of Chester-le-Street on 1 March 1973.

== Vacancy ==
The by-election had been caused by the death aged 60 years on 28 October 1972 of the sitting Labour Member of Parliament (MP) Norman Pentland. Pentland had held Chester-le-Street since himself winning a by-election there on 27 September 1956.

== Candidates ==
The Labour Party chose Giles Radice, the then Head of the Research Department of the General and Municipal Workers Union as their candidate. The Conservatives selected merchant banker Neil Balfour and the Liberals adopted George Suggett, an antique dealer from Newbury in Berkshire but who had been born in the constituency and who was the son of a Durham miner. The Liberals had not contested any Parliamentary election in Chester-le-Street since the 1929 general election. Suggett himself had previously stood for the Newbury seat in 1945 as a member of the Common Wealth Party.

== Previous general election ==
The contest in Chester-le-Street at the 1970 general election had been a straight fight between Labour and Conservative parties at which Norman Pentland had a healthy majority of 20,331 votes.

== Political background to the by-election ==
By any measure Chester-le-Street was a very safe Labour seat and the party had held it for nearly 70 years. At a time of Conservative government which was proving difficult for Prime Minister Edward Heath, damaged politically as he was by a series of economic and social problems there was no expectation of a serious challenge for Tory candidate Neil Balfour.

The by-election came at a better time for the Liberal Party. The Liberals had won two by-elections at the end of 1972; the first at Rochdale had been won from Labour by Cyril Smith, the second at Sutton and Cheam had been captured from the Conservatives. Cook & Ramsden characterise 1972-73 as a time of Liberal surge. Further by-election success would follow for the Liberals during the 1970-1974 Parliament. Further difficulties would also follow for Labour with the by-election at Lincoln which was held on the same day as Chester-le-Street. This resulted in the return to Parliament of Dick Taverne standing for election as Democratic Labour candidate, having fallen out with his local Constituency Labour Party. The problems Labour experienced in Lincoln, particularly in relation to the pro-European views of people like Taverne and Roy Jenkins, have been cited as an early example of the kind of problems which led ultimately to the split in the Labour Party in 1981 and the formation of the Social Democratic Party. In July 1974 similar trouble emerged for Labour with the defection to the Liberals of Christopher Mayhew, Labour MP for Woolwich East.

== By-election issues ==
Labour fought on the poor record of the Conservative government. The Tories highlighted improvements in pensions and government investment in regional development in the North East of England. The Liberals were starting from scratch in their campaign and attacked Labour for its complacency in an area which it was alleged they took their support for granted and the Conservatives on their performance on questions such as poverty and unemployment.

=== Nomination of Giles Radice ===
An issue which surfaced during the campaign and which caused a great deal of bitterness was the question of how Labour candidate Giles Radice had been selected. The New Statesman magazine published an article on 23 February 1973, written by journalist Richard West, alleging that officials of the General and Municipal Workers Union had systematically gained control of the Chester-le-Street Constituency Labour Party and had in effect gerrymandered their representation in the division to obtain more votes than affiliated branches of other trade unions. In his article West claimed that the union's tactics had proved unpopular and divisive inside the local Labour party with 'loyal party workers' and some groups, such as the women's section, being particularly disgruntled.

=== Liberal 'smears' ===
In the aftermath of this controversy, Labour turned its attack on the campaign of the Liberal candidate, accusing George Suggett of trying to smear Giles Radice personally and of trying to capitalise unfairly on the nomination issue. At the declaration of the votes, Radice announced that whereas the Conservatives had conducted a clean and honest campaign, he was not going to comment on the approach of his other opponent. As Suggett tried to make his speech after the declaration he was constantly heckled and jeered by the Labour supporters, who were later silent for the speech of Neil Balfour. Suggett denied he had smeared Radice and invited the press to review his election literature and campaign speeches for any evidence of misconduct. He said the real reason was so angry was that the Liberals had "broken the weighbridge on which the Labour majority in Chester-le-Street used to be weighed". Cyril Smith, who had campaigned for Suggett in the by-election, recalled later that he deliberately, if obliquely, had raised the issue of political corruption by mentioning in a speech at the opening of the campaign the T. Dan Smith affair and how it was uncovering new instances of corruption amongst Labour councillors in the North East, including one from Chester-le-Street who later went to prison. As far as the Liberal Party was concerned, commented Smith, this was legitimate political meat and needed no apology.

== Result ==
Radice held the seat for Labour with a majority of 7,066 over Suggett, having taken 53% of the poll. Balfour came third, losing his deposit. Radice went on to represent Chester-le-Street in the Labour interest until the seat was abolished in 1983. He was then selected as Labour candidate for North Durham the successor seat which included large parts of the old Chester-le-Street constituency, until he stood down from Parliament at the 2001 general election. Neil Balfour fought Chester-le-Street again at the February 1974 general election again coming third behind the Liberals. Perhaps bruised by the attacks upon him, Suggett does not appear to have been a candidate at any further Parliamentary elections but played an active but more backroom role in Newbury.

Chester-le-Street by-election, 1973
Party	Candidate	Votes	%	±%
Labour	Giles Radice	25,874	53.06	−18.54
Liberal	George Booth Suggett	18,808	38.57	New
Conservative	Neil Balfour	4,092	8.39	−20.01
Majority		7,066	14.49	−28.71
Turnout		48,768	71.4	−2.3
Labour hold		Swing		

== See also ==
- List of United Kingdom by-elections
- United Kingdom by-election records
