= Yorkshire North (European Parliament constituency) =

- European Parliament constituency
- Boundary within the Yorkshire and the Humber (1979-1984)
- Member state: United Kingdom
- Created: 1979
- Dissolved: 1984
- MEPs: 1

Sources
- United Kingdom Election Results

Yorkshire North was a European Parliament constituency covering much of North Yorkshire and part of Humberside in England.

Prior to its uniform adoption of proportional representation in 1999, the United Kingdom used first-past-the-post for the European elections in England, Scotland and Wales. The European Parliament constituencies used under that system were smaller than the later regional constituencies and each had one Member of the European Parliament.

The constituency consisted of the Westminster Parliament constituencies of Barkston Ash, Goole, Harrogate, Ripon, Skipton, Thirsk and Malton, York. In 1984, most of the seats became part of the new York constituency, with small parts going to Humberside and Yorkshire South.

== Members of the European Parliament ==
Elected	Name	Party
1979	Neil Balfour	Conservative
1984	Constituency abolished	

== Results ==
European Parliament election, 1979: Yorkshire North
Party	Candidate	Votes	%	±%
Conservative	Neil Balfour	98,464	59.1	
Labour	Fred Singleton	41,408	24.8	
Liberal	Claire Brooks	26,812	16.1	
Majority		57,056	34.3	
Turnout		166,684	34.5	
Conservative win (new seat)				
