= York (European Parliament constituency) =

Former European Parliament constituency

- European Parliament constituency
- Boundary within Yorkshire and the Humber (1984-1994)
- Member state: United Kingdom
- Created: 1984
- Dissolved: 1994
- MEPs: 1

Sources
- United Kingdom Election Results

York was a European Parliament constituency covering much of North Yorkshire in England.

Prior to its uniform adoption of proportional representation in 1999, the United Kingdom used first-past-the-post for the European elections in England, Scotland and Wales. The European Parliament constituencies used under that system were smaller than the later regional constituencies and only had one Member of the European Parliament each.

The constituency was created in 1984, incorporating most of the former Yorkshire North constituency and part of Cleveland. It consisted of the Westminster Parliament constituencies of Boothferry, Glanford and Scunthorpe, Harrogate, Ryedale, Scarborough, Selby and York.

Much of the seat became part of the North Yorkshire constituency in 1994, with the remainder going to Humberside. These seats became part of the much larger Yorkshire and the Humber constituency in 1999.

== Members of the European Parliament ==
Elected	Name	Party
1984	Edward McMillan-Scott	Conservative
1994	Constituency abolished	

== Results ==
European Parliament election, 1984: York
Party	Candidate	Votes	%	±%
Conservative	Edward Macmillan-Scott	80,636	51.0	
Labour	Shirley Haines	44,234	27.9	
SDP	Maurice G. Howard	33,356	21.1	
Majority		36,402	23.1	
Turnout		158,226	30.6	
New creation: Conservative gain.		Swing	N/A	

European Parliament election, 1989: York
Party	Candidate	Votes	%	±%
Conservative	Edward Macmillan-Scott	81,453	43.4	−7.6
Labour	John Grogan	66,531	35.3	+7.4
Green	Rod J. Bell	27,525	14.6	New
SLD	Arthur Collinge	12,542	6.7	−14.4
Majority		15,102	8.1	−15.0
Turnout		188,051	34.6	+4.0
Conservative hold		Swing		
