= North Yorkshire (European Parliament constituency) =

Former European Parliament constituency

- European Parliament constituency
- Boundary within Yorkshire and the Humber (1994-1999)
- Member state: United Kingdom
- Created: 1994
- Dissolved: 1999
- MEPs: 1

North Yorkshire was a European Parliament constituency covering much of the county of North Yorkshire in England.

Prior to its uniform adoption of proportional representation in 1999, the United Kingdom used first-past-the-post for the European elections in England, Scotland and Wales. The European Parliament constituencies used under that system were smaller than the later regional constituencies and only had one Member of the European Parliament each.

The constituency was created in 1994, incorporating most of the former York constituency and part of Cleveland and Yorkshire North. It consisted of the Westminster Parliament constituencies (on their 1983 boundaries) of Harrogate, Ryedale, Scarborough, Selby, Skipton and Ripon, and York.

The seat became part of the much larger Yorkshire and the Humber constituency in 1999.

== Members of the European Parliament ==
Elected	Name	Party
1994	Edward McMillan-Scott	Conservative
1999	Constituency abolished: see Yorkshire and the Humber	

== Results ==
European Parliament election, 1994: North Yorkshire
Party	Candidate	Votes	%	±%
Conservative	Edward Macmillan-Scott	70,036	38.0	
Labour	Bernard Regan	62,964	34.2	
Liberal Democrats	Michael Pitts	43,171	23.5	
Green	Dick Richardson	7,036	3.8	
Natural Law	Stuart Withers	891	0.5	
Majority		7,072	3.8	
Turnout		184,098	38.7	
New creation: Conservative gain.		Swing	N/A	
