= Parliamentary Secretary to the Ministry for Pensions =

Defunct British junior ministerial office

The Parliamentary Secretary to the Ministry of Pensions was a junior Ministerial office at Parliamentary Secretary rank in the British Government, supporting the Minister for Pensions. Today, the role is known as the Parliamentary Under-Secretary of State for Pensions.

== Establishment and history ==
The office was established in 1916 and filled intermittently until 1932. It was established again from 1940, with joint holders from 1951. In 1944 a separate Ministry of National Insurance was formed and from 1945 until 1951 there was a Parliamentary Secretary to the Ministry of National Insurance. The two departments merged in 1953. In 1966 the department became the Ministry of Social Security, and the title of the Parliamentary Secretary post changed accordingly.

== Parliamentary Secretaries to the Ministry of Pensions, 1916–1966 ==
Name	Entered office	Left office
Arthur Griffith-Boscawen	1916	1919
Sir James Craig, 1st Baronet	1919	1920
George Tryon	1920	1922
Vacant	1922	1923
Charles Curtis Craig	1923	1924
Vacant	1924	1924
George Frederick Stanley	1924	1929
Vacant	1929	1931
Cuthbert Headlam	1931	September 1932
Vacant	September 1932	1940
Ellen Wilkinson	1940	1940
George Tryon, 1st Baron Tryon	1940	1941
Wilfred Paling	1941	1945
William Sidney	1945	1945
Jennie Adamson	1945	1946
Arthur Blenkinsop	1946	1949
Charles Simmons	1949	1951
John Smyth and Robin Turton	5 November 1951	18 October 1954
John Smyth and Ernest Marples	18 October 1954	20 December 1955
Edith Pitt and Richard Wood	20 December 1955	14 April 1958
Edith Pitt and William Fletcher-Vane	14 April 1958	22 October 1959
William Fletcher-Vane and Patricia Hornsby-Smith	22 October 1959	20 October 1960
Patricia Hornsby-Smith	20 October 1960	28 October 1960
Patricia Hornsby-Smith and Bernard Braine	28 October 1960	8 February 1961
Patricia Hornsby-Smith and Richard Sharples	8 February 1961	31 August 1961
Richard Sharples	31 August 1961	9 October 1961
Richard Sharples and Margaret Thatcher	9 October 1961	16 July 1962
Margaret Thatcher and Lynch Maydon	16 July 1962	16 October 1964
Harold Davies and Norman Pentland	20 October 1964	6 August 1966

== Parliamentary Secretaries to the Ministry of National Insurance, 1945–1951 ==
Name	Entered office	Left office
Charles Peat	22 March 1945	16 June 1945
George Lindgren	1945	1946
Tom Steele	1946	1950
Bernard Taylor	1950	1951

== Parliamentary Secretaries to the Ministry of Social Security, 1966–1968 ==
Name	Entered office	Left office
Harold Davies and Norman Pentland	6 August 1966	7 January 1967
Norman Pentland and Charles Loughlin	7 January 1967	1 November 1968
