= Chester-le-Street (constituency) =

Parliamentary constituency in the United Kingdom, 1885–1983

- Former county constituency for the House of Commons
- Boundary of Chester-le-Street in County Durham, boundaries 1974–1983

1885–1983
- Seats: one
- Created from: North Durham
- Replaced by: North Durham, Houghton & Washington and Blaydon

Chester-le-Street was a county constituency centred on the town of Chester-le-Street in County Durham. It returned one Member of Parliament (MP) to the House of Commons of the Parliament of the United Kingdom from 1885 to 1983.

== History ==
=== Creation ===
The constituency was created for the 1885 general election by the Redistribution of Seats Act 1885 as one of eight new single-member divisions of the county of Durham, replacing the two 2-member seats of North Durham and South Durham. The seat covered a large area of north Durham, including areas which are now part of the Borough of Gateshead (Ryton, Blaydon and Whickham) and the City of Sunderland (Washington) in the metropolitan county of Tyne and Wear.

=== Boundaries ===
==== 1885–1918 ====
- The Sessional Divisions of Chester-le-Street and Gateshead (part); and
- The Municipal Borough of Gateshead

NB included only non-resident freeholders in the parliamentary borough of Gateshead.

See map on Vision of Britain website.

==== 1918–1950 ====
- The Urban District of Chester-le-Street; and
- the Rural District of Chester-le-Street.

The constituency was divided in two, with the areas comprising the urban districts of Ryton, Blaydon and Whickham forming the bulk of the new constituency of Blaydon. Gained Witton Gilbert from the abolished constituency of Mid Durham.

==== 1950–1983 ====
- The Urban Districts of Chester-le-Street and Washington; and
- the Rural District of Chester-le-Street.

Minor changes to reflect changes in local authority boundaries; the urban district of Washington had been created in 1922 from the rural district of Chester-le-Street.

=== Abolition ===
The seat was abolished for the 1983 general election as a result of the periodic review of parliamentary constituencies following the re-organisation of local government under the Local Government Act 1972. On abolition, the area which had comprised the new town of Washington was included in the new constituency of Houghton and Washington; the parishes of Birtley and Lamesley were transferred to Blaydon; and the remainder, comprising about half the electorate, becoming part of the re-established seat of North Durham.

=== Political history ===
Chester-le-Street and its successor constituency (North Durham) have over 100 years of continuous Labour representation.

== Members of Parliament ==
Election	Member	Party	Notes
1885	James Joicey	Liberal	
1906	John Taylor	Labour	Resigned October 1919
1919 by-election	Jack Lawson	Labour	
1950	Patrick Bartley	Labour	Died June 1956
1956 by-election	Norman Pentland	Labour	Died October 1972
1973 by-election	Giles Radice	Labour	
1983	constituency abolished: see North Durham		

== Election results ==
=== Elections in the 1880s ===
Joicey

General election 1885: Chester-le-Street
Party	Candidate	Votes	%	±%
Liberal	James Joicey	4,409	44.0	
Independent Liberal	R Lloyd Jones	3,606	36.9	
Conservative	Walter Ashworth	2,018	20.1	
Majority		803	7.1	
Turnout		10,033	84.8	
Registered electors		11,830		
Liberal win (new seat)				

General election 1886: Chester-le-Street
Party	Candidate	Votes	%	±%
Liberal	James Joicey	Unopposed		
Liberal hold				

=== Elections in the 1890s ===
General election 1892: Chester-le-Street
Party	Candidate	Votes	%	±%
Liberal	James Joicey	6,453	61.3	N/A
Liberal Unionist	Sir Edward Sullivan, 2nd Baronet	4,066	38.7	New
Majority		2,387	22.6	N/A
Turnout		10,519	79.9	N/A
Registered electors		13,169		
Liberal hold				

Morpeth

General election 1895: Chester-le-Street
Party	Candidate	Votes	%	±%
Liberal	James Joicey	7,370	64.2	+2.9
Liberal Unionist	Viscount Morpeth	4,113	35.8	−2.9
Majority		3,257	28.4	+5.8
Turnout		11,483	78.6	−1.3
Registered electors		14,618		
Liberal hold		Swing	+2.9	

=== Elections in the 1900s ===
General election 1900: Chester-le-Street
Party	Candidate	Votes	%	±%
Liberal	James Joicey	5,830	52.0	−12.2
Conservative	John Nicholson	5,391	48.0	+12.2
Majority		439	4.0	−24.4
Turnout		11,221	68.6	−10.0
Registered electors		16,358		
Liberal hold		Swing	−12.2	

General election 1906: Chester-le-Street
Party	Candidate	Votes	%	±%
Independent Labour	John Wilkinson Taylor	8,085	45.6	New
Conservative	Slingsby Duncombe Shafto	4,985	28.1	−19.9
Liberal	Alfred Barrett Tebb	4,660	26.3	−25.7
Majority		3,100	17.5	N/A
Turnout		17,730	84.8	+16.2
Registered electors		20,910		
Independent Labour gain from Liberal		Swing		

=== Elections in the 1910s ===
General election January 1910: Chester-le-Street
Party	Candidate	Votes	%	±%
Labour	John Wilkinson Taylor	12,684	64.8	+19.2
Conservative	Slingsby Duncombe Shafto	6,891	35.2	+7.1
Majority		5,793	29.6	+12.1
Turnout		19,575		
Labour hold		Swing	+6.0	

General election December 1910: Chester-le-Street
Party	Candidate	Votes	%	±%
Labour	John Wilkinson Taylor	Unopposed		
Labour hold				

General Election 1914–15:

Another General Election was required to take place before the end of 1915. The political parties had been making preparations for an election to take place and by July 1914, the following candidates had been selected;

- Labour: John Gilliland

General election 1918: Chester-le-Street
Party	Candidate	Votes	%	±%
Labour	John Wilkinson Taylor	Unopposed		
Labour hold				

1919 Chester-le-Street by-election
Party	Candidate	Votes	%	±%
Labour	Jack Lawson	17,838	77.1	N/A
National Democratic	David Gilmour	5,313	22.9	New
Majority		12,525	54.2	N/A
Turnout		23,151	63.7	N/A
Registered electors		36,321		
Labour hold				

=== Elections in the 1920s ===
General election 1922: Chester-le-Street
Party	Candidate	Votes	%	±%
Labour	Jack Lawson	20,296	68.5	N/A
Unionist	David Fee Todd	9,335	31.5	New
Majority		10,961	37.0	N/A
Turnout		29,631	76.6	N/A
Registered electors		38,672		
Labour hold				

General election 1923: Chester-le-Street
Party	Candidate	Votes	%	±%
Labour	Jack Lawson	20,712	74.7	+6.2
Unionist	Charles Reginald Schiller Harris	7,015	25.3	−6.2
Majority		13,697	49.4	+12.4
Turnout		27,727	70.1	−6.5
Registered electors		39,532		
Labour hold		Swing	+6.2	

General election 1924: Chester-le-Street
Party	Candidate	Votes	%	±%
Labour	Jack Lawson	22,700	71.0	−3.7
Unionist	Michael Dodds McCarthy	9,250	29.0	+3.7
Majority		13,450	42.0	−7.4
Turnout		31,950	78.7	+8.6
Registered electors		40,578		
Labour hold		Swing	−3.7	

General election 1929: Chester-le-Street
Party	Candidate	Votes	%	±%
Labour	Jack Lawson	26,975	69.8	−1.2
Unionist	E.G. Payne	6,334	16.4	−12.6
Liberal	Joseph William Wright	5,340	13.8	New
Majority		20,641	53.4	+11.4
Turnout		38,649	78.5	−0.2
Registered electors		49,243		
Labour hold		Swing	+5.7	

=== Elections in the 1930s ===
General election 1931: Chester-le-Street
Party	Candidate	Votes	%	±%
Labour	Jack Lawson	24,373	60.62	
Conservative	Ronald Kellett	15,834	39.38	
Majority		8,539	21.24	
Turnout		40,207	79.35	
Labour hold		Swing		

General election 1935: Chester-le-Street
Party	Candidate	Votes	%	±%
Labour	Jack Lawson	29,111	70.98	
Conservative	Charles Robert Ingram Besley	11,901	29.02	
Majority		17,210	41.96	
Turnout		41,012	78.24	
Labour hold		Swing		

=== Election in the 1940s ===
General election 1945: Chester-le-Street
Party	Candidate	Votes	%	±%
Labour	Jack Lawson	33,788	76.76	
Conservative	Antony Lambton	10,228	23.24	
Majority		23,560	53.53	
Turnout		44,016	79.79	
Labour hold		Swing		

=== Elections in the 1950s ===
General election 1950: Chester-le-Street
Party	Candidate	Votes	%	±%
Labour	Patrick Bartley	35,348	77.30	
Conservative	Harry John Martin Millican	10,379	22.70	
Majority		24,969	54.60	
Turnout		45,727	87.28	
Labour hold		Swing		

General election 1951: Chester-le-Street
Party	Candidate	Votes	%	±%
Labour	Patrick Bartley	35,511	76.96	
Conservative	Harry John Martin Millican	10,632	23.04	
Majority		24,879	53.92	
Turnout		46,143	86.64	
Labour hold		Swing		

General election 1955: Chester-le-Street
Party	Candidate	Votes	%	±%
Labour	Patrick Bartley	32,323	76.29	
Conservative	David A Wright	10,047	23.71	
Majority		22,276	52.58	
Turnout		42,370	79.57	
Labour hold		Swing		

1956 Chester-le-Street by-election
Party	Candidate	Votes	%	±%
Labour	Norman Pentland	27,912	80.8	+4.5
Conservative	William Rees-Mogg	6,625	19.2	−4.5
Majority		21,287	61.6	+9.0
Turnout		34,537	65.0	−14.6
Labour hold		Swing		

General election 1959: Chester-le-Street
Party	Candidate	Votes	%	±%
Labour	Norman Pentland	33,901	75.78	
Conservative	William Rees-Mogg	10,838	24.22	
Majority		23,063	51.56	
Turnout		44,739	83.03	
Labour hold		Swing		

=== Elections in the 1960s ===
General election 1964: Chester-le-Street
Party	Candidate	Votes	%	±%
Labour	Norman Pentland	32,895	75.20	
Conservative	John Gorst	10,851	24.80	
Majority		22,044	50.40	
Turnout		43,746	79.43	
Labour hold		Swing		

General election 1966: Chester-le-Street
Party	Candidate	Votes	%	±%
Labour	Norman Pentland	32,467	76.96	
Conservative	Charles Maxwell Kirwan Taylor	9,720	23.04	
Majority		22,747	53.92	
Turnout		42,187	74.87	
Labour hold		Swing		

=== Elections in the 1970s ===
General election 1970: Chester-le-Street
Party	Candidate	Votes	%	±%
Labour	Norman Pentland	33,694	71.60	
Conservative	Dennis Ramshaw	13,363	28.40	
Majority		20,331	43.20	
Turnout		47,057	73.67	
Labour hold		Swing		

1973 Chester-le-Street by-election
Party	Candidate	Votes	%	±%
Labour	Giles Radice	25,874	53.06	−18.54
Liberal	George Booth Suggett	18,808	38.57	New
Conservative	Neil Balfour	4,092	8.39	−20.01
Majority		7,066	14.49	−28.71
Turnout		48,768	71.4	−2.3
Labour hold		Swing		

General election February 1974: Chester-le-Street
Party	Candidate	Votes	%	±%
Labour	Giles Radice	33,534	59.21	+6.15
Liberal	David James Herd	14,808	26.15	−12.42
Conservative	Neil Balfour	8,291	14.64	+6.25
Majority		18,726	33.06	
Turnout		56,633	83.48	
Labour hold		Swing		

General election October 1974: Chester-le-Street
Party	Candidate	Votes	%	±%
Labour	Giles Radice	33,511	65.69	+6.48
Liberal	Douglas McCourt	9,233	18.10	−8.05
Conservative	R Ditchburn	8,268	16.21	+1.57
Majority		24,278	47.59	+14.53
Turnout		51,012	74.63	
Labour hold		Swing		

General election 1979: Chester-le-Street
Party	Candidate	Votes	%	±%
Labour	Giles Radice	38,672	60.40	−5.29
Conservative	James Couchman	16,112	25.16	+8.95
Liberal	Douglas McCourt	9,247	14.44	−3.66
Majority		22,560	35.24	−12.35
Turnout		64,031	76.76	+2.13
Labour hold		Swing		

== See also ==
- History of parliamentary constituencies and boundaries in Durham
