= Edward McMillan-Scott =

British politician (born 1949)

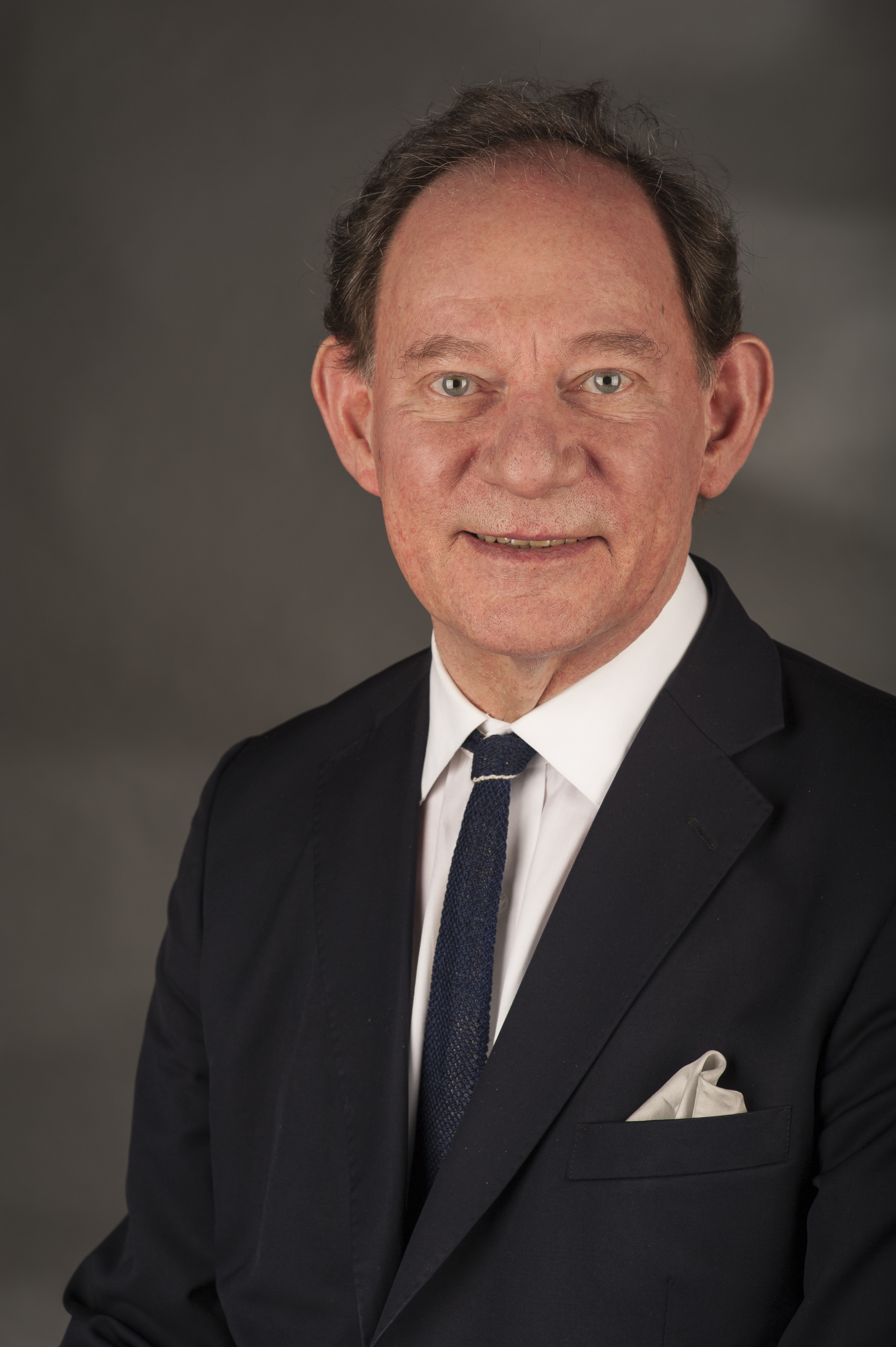

Eighth Vice-President of the European Parliament
- In office 17 January 2012 – 1 July 2014
- President: Martin Schulz
- Preceded by: Isabelle Durant
- Succeeded by: Sylvie Guillaume

Twelfth Vice-President of the European Parliament
- In office 14 July 2009 – 17 January 2012
- President: Jerzy Buzek
- Preceded by: Diana Wallis
- Succeeded by: Oldřich Vlasák

Fourth Vice-President of the European Parliament
- In office 30 July 2004 – 14 July 2009
- President: Josep Borrell; Hans-Gert Pöttering
- Succeeded by: Miguel Ángel Martínez Martínez

Leader of the Conservatives in the European Parliament
- In office 16 September 1997 – 14 December 2001
- Preceded by: Tom Spencer
- Succeeded by: Jonathan Evans
Parliamentary offices
Member of the European Parliament for Yorkshire and the Humber
In office 10 June 1999 – 2 July 2014
Preceded by	Constituency established
Succeeded by	Jane Collins
Member of the European Parliament for North Yorkshire
In office 9 June 1994 – 10 June 1999
Preceded by	Constituency established
Succeeded by	Constituency abolished
Member of the European Parliament for York
In office 14 June 1984 – 9 June 1994
Preceded by	Constituency established
Succeeded by	Constituency abolished

Personal details
- Born: 15 August 1949 (age 77) Cambridge, England
- Party: Non-party (2019–present); Liberal Democrats (2010–2019); Independent (2009–2010); Conservative (1967–2009)
- Spouse: Henrietta McMillan-Scott

Edward McMillan-Scott (born in Cambridge on 15 August 1949) is a British politician. He was a pro-EU Member of the European Parliament (MEP) for York and Yorkshire and the Humber constituencies from 1984 until 2014. He was the last and one of the longest-serving UK Vice-Presidents of the European Parliament 2004–2014, holding its Human Rights and Democracy portfolio throughout. In 2009, he renounced a peerage (life membership of the House of Lords) in protest at UK premier David Cameron's withdrawal from the Centrist EPP Group. After losing his seat as an MEP he became active in campaigning against Brexit and coordinates the largest pro EU forum in the UK.

McMillan-Scott was elected an honorary Board member of the European Parliament's 700-member Former Members Association in 2014 and has been re-elected biannually since. In 2014 he was also elected an honorary Patron at its AGM by the European Movement UK, which he first joined aged 23 in 1973.

McMillan-Scott is a lifelong pro-European. Following David Cameron's decision to withdraw the Conservative MEPs from the centre-right European People's Party in order to form the European Conservative and Reformist's Group, McMillan-Scott objected. When the composition of Cameron's new ECR group was announced after the European elections of 2009, McMillan-Scott protested and left. The new group was described by Liberal Democrat leader Nick Clegg as "a bunch of nutters, homophobes, anti-Semites and climate change deniers".

In July 2009 McMillan-Scott successfully stood as the first-ever Independent vice-president of the European Parliament against the nominee of the ECR Group, Polish MEP Michał Kamiński, criticising Kamiński's past links to extremism, confirmed inter alia by the Daily Telegraph. Shortly before this, McMillan-Scott was telephoned by then UK premier David Cameron, who offered him a peerage (membership of the House of Lords) the usual reward for leaders of the Conservative group of MEPs (Henry Plumb, Christopher Prout, Timothy Kirkhope etc ) but McMillan-Scott declined.

In 1992, McMillan-Scott founded the EU's Instrument for Human Rights and Democracy (EIDHR) - now the EU's Global Europe Human Rights & Democracy Programme, which remain's the world's largest dedicated programme with an annual budget of Euro 1.5 billion.

In March 2010, he joined the Liberal Democrats with whom he had usually worked closely on democracy and human rights issues. In May 2010 he became a member of the Group of the Alliance of Liberals and Democrats for Europe (ALDE) in the European Parliament. He then sat as ALDE Vice-President of the European Parliament. In January 2012, he was re-elected as vice-president for the fourth time. He once again received the portfolio for Democracy and Human Rights as well as additionally gaining the Sakharov Prize Network, which underpins the parliament's annual prize for freedom of expression and responsibility for transatlantic relations.

Since 2017 McMillan-Scott has coordinated a forum of operational pro-European organisations known as Where Next for Brexit? now renamed PRO EU FORUM UK. This was the stakeholder forum for the Grassroots Coordinating Group set up by former MPs Chuka Umunna and Anna Soubry to argue for a second referendum on Brexit and is closely linked to the European Movement. McMillan-Scott and colleagues raised over £2 million for the People's Vote campaign, launched in April 2018 to campaign for a second referendum on Brexit.

== Early life ==
McMillan-Scott was born 15 August 1949 in Cambridge, England, one of seven children of Walter, an architect, and Elisabeth McMillan-Scott, née Hudson. He was educated privately by Dominican friars. He worked across the continent, the USSR and Africa as a tour director for a US company for several years. He speaks French, Italian, some German and Spanish. From 1973 he worked in public affairs and in 1982 set up his own Whitehall consultancy. His clients included the Falkland Islands Government. He became a member of the Conservative Party in 1967 and joined the European Movement in 1973. He was one of the joint regional coordinators for the Yes to Europe campaign in the 1975 referendum on EC membership.

== European Parliament ==
McMillan-Scott was elected as the MEP for York from 1984 to 1994, then MEP for North Yorkshire from 1994 to 1999, and an MEP for Yorkshire and the Humber from 1999 until 2014.

=== Roles and responsibilities ===
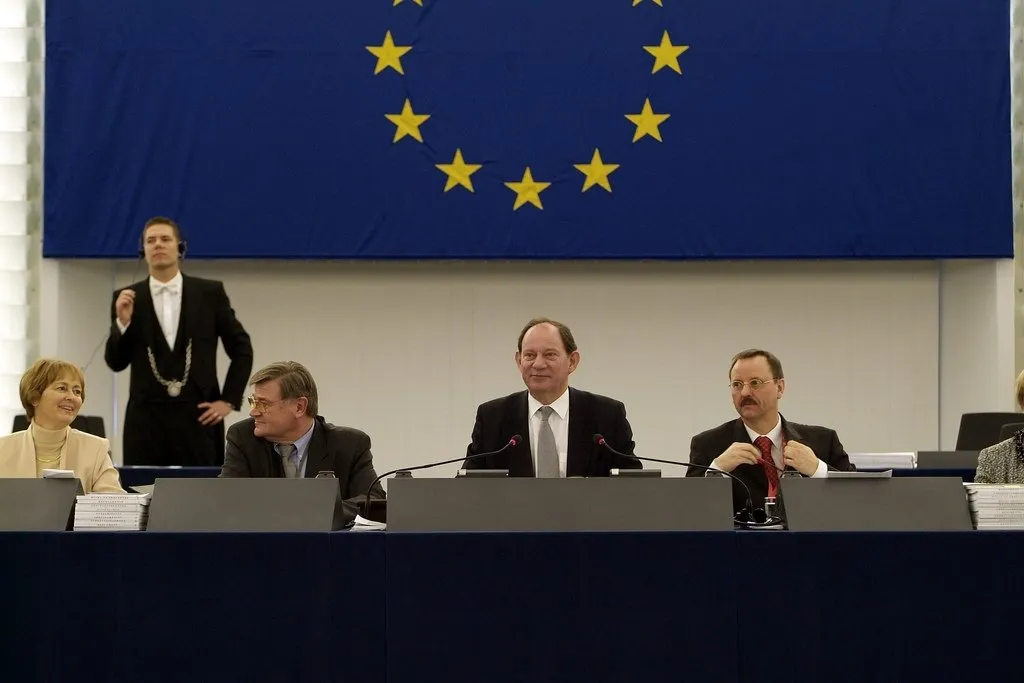
McMillan-Scott (centre)

McMillan-Scott was leader of the British Conservative MEPs between September 1997 and December 2001, and attended the Shadow Cabinet on European issues. On 23 July 2004 he was elected fourth of the 14 Vice-Presidents of the European Parliament. He was re-elected a vice-president in 2007, 2009 and 2012. McMillan-Scott's special responsibilities as vice-president included relations with national EU parliaments and the Euro-Mediterranean Parliamentary Assembly, which brings together 280 MPs from the EU, North Africa and the Middle East. After re-election as vice-president in 2009, his responsibilities as vice-president were Democracy and Human Rights, relations with national parliaments, and chairing the European Parliament's Audit Panel. After re-election in 2012 he continued with the democracy and human rights portfolio and additionally the Sakharov Prize Network and transatlantic relations.

He founded the regular forum between the Human Rights and Democracy Network, more than 40 Brussels-based NGOs, and the European Parliament, whose aim is to maximise EU attention to these topics.

He sat on the Supervisory Group which oversees all the European Parliament's democracy and human rights activities, including election observation. He has participated in numerous such missions since 1990. He was elected chairman of the European Parliament's largest-ever election observer missions, 30 MEPs, to the Palestinian territories in January 2005 and January 2006. These observers monitored the Palestinian National Authority's presidential and parliamentary elections.

== Awards and prizes ==
=== Medal of Honour ===
McMillan-Scott was presented in September 2013 with the Medal of Honour by the Venice-based European Inter-University Centre for Human Rights and Democratisation, comprising 41 universities, "in recognition of his lasting efforts in the promotion and protection of human rights". Previous winners are Mary Robinson, former UN High Commissioner for Human Rights, and Manfred Nowak, former UN Special Rapporteur on Torture.

=== Outstanding Contribution ===
McMillan-Scott won the top award, for "Outstanding Contribution" in the 2012 MEP Awards presented by the Parliament magazine, Brussels sister publication of Westminster's House magazine. The citation referred to his achievements in democracy and human rights, especially his active involvement in the Arab Spring, as well as his leadership of the Single Seat campaign to end MEPs' monthly trek from their base in Brussels to their official "seat" in Strasbourg.

== Campaigning ==
=== Democracy and human rights ===
After the fall of the Berlin Wall, McMillan-Scott founded the European Instrument for Democracy and Human Rights (EIDHR), to facilitate the development of democracy and civil society in the ex-Soviet bloc countries, and which is now directed towards the reforming Arab world and countries resisting reform such as China, Cuba and Russia. The instrument makes €1.5 billion every seven years available to those promoting human rights and democracy, often without the applicant's host country consent.

As a frequent visitor to countries of the former Soviet Bloc and its satellites after his election in 1984, where he had contacts with dissidents, McMillan-Scott was arrested and fined in Leningrad (now St Petersburg) in 1972 for visiting former religious institutions while working as a tour guide. He was present during the October 1993 attempted coup d'état by old guard communists against President Boris Yeltsin and was the only outside politician to speak at Garry Kasparov's July 2006 "Other Russia" rally.

Since then he visited Russia frequently to engage with the leaders of the mounting anti-Putin movement and initiated a range of debates, resolutions, conferences and other activities across the European Union to draw attention to the collapse of the democratic system in Russia. This culminated in a barrage of denunciations after the Russian takeover of the Crimea in 2014, and a rigorous set of sanctions against the Putin regime, in which McMillan-Scott played a leading role in Brussels.

In May 2015, he was one of nine British politicians on President Putin's visa blacklist.

From 2004 – 2012 he chaired the European Parliament's informal, cross-party Democracy Caucus, which was set up to campaign for a European Endowment for Democracy and Human Rights (EED). The ambition was to have an equivalent to Washington's National Endowment for Democracy, to work at arms'-length from the EU and to be deniable, expert and flexible. The EED was set up in 2012.

McMillan-Scott is one of the foremost campaigners for reform in China. After his last visit to Beijing, in May 2006, all the dissidents and former prisoners-of-conscience with whom he had contact were arrested, imprisoned and in some cases tortured. These included the Christian human rights lawyer Gao Zhisheng and environmental activist Hu Jia. McMillan-Scott successfully nominated Hu Jia for the 2008 Sakharov Prize for Freedom of Expression, awarded annually by the European Parliament. He has sponsored numerous activities, hearings and resolutions focussed on reform in China. In November 2010 he met the dissident artist Ai Weiwei, co-designer of Beijing's Birds Nest stadium, who made a highly-critical series of comments for McMillan-Scott's YouTube channel. Ai Weiwei later spent some months under house arrest in Beijing.

He has argued for an Impunity Index to be maintained by the International Criminal Court, based on the West German Salzgitter Process during the Cold War, where anonymous denunciations of crimes against humanity in totalitarian states may later lead to prosecutions.

He wrote a key report for the European Parliament's foreign affairs select committee, of which he was at one time the longest-serving member, on a new EU–China strategy in 1997. Following subsequent visits to China and pre-Olympic crackdowns he initiated a campaign aimed at an EU political boycott of the August 2008 Beijing Olympic Games. In the event, the Presidents of the European Parliament and European Commission boycotted the Games, as did the EU's external affairs Commissioner.

McMillan-Scott was the first politician to visit Tibet after a three-year blackout, in 1996. He has subsequently championed the cause of Tibetan independence, taking part in numerous activities to highlight oppression in Tibet. He and his staff have made many speeches and taken part in pro-democracy activities with Tibetan exiles.

In October 2006, McMillan-Scott visited Cuba, where he met Sakharov prize winners, the "Ladies in White", and the late Oswaldo Payá, as well as other dissidents. He has since encouraged their campaign for political freedoms.

=== Falun Gong ===
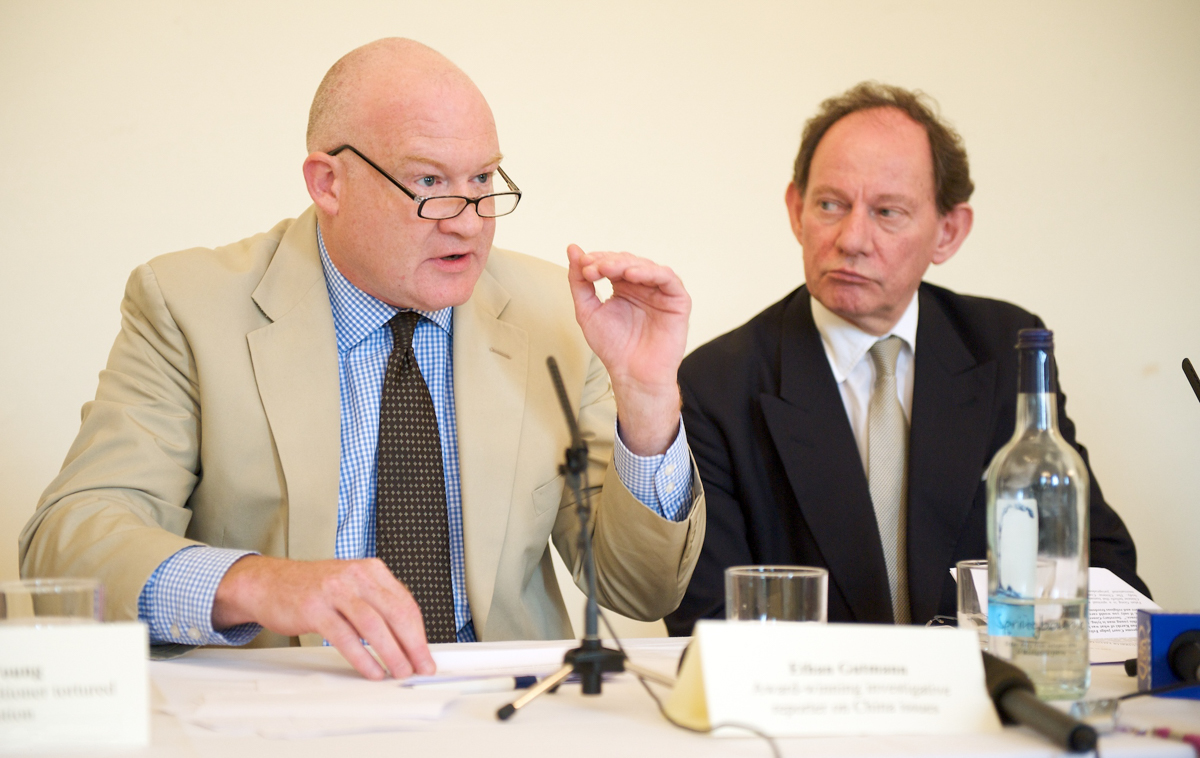
McMillan-Scott and Ethan Gutmann in a press conference, 2009

McMillan-Scott, although he has no religious beliefs, has championed Falun Gong, a spiritual practice which has been persecuted by the Chinese government since 1999. In 2006 he stated "We are talking about genocide. The Falun Gong has been singled out. This is why governments must take action and put pressure to bear on the United Nations to conduct an inquiry." He met many former prisoners and published accounts of their torture.

He campaigned against organ harvesting of Falun Gong in China. In 2012 he stated, "I am absolutely convinced that over a long period from 1999 onwards, organ harvesting from prisoners has been taking place, especially of Falun Gong". Ethan Gutmann interviewed over 100 witnesses and estimated that 65,000 Falun Gong practitioners were killed for their organs from 2000 to 2008.

=== Arab world ===
McMillan-Scott, a relation of T. E. Lawrence through the latter's father, Sir Thomas Chapman Bt, has campaigned for reform across the Arab world since a visit to Jordan in 1993. He championed Egypt's liberal El Ghad party from 2003, and secured the release of its leader, Dr Ayman Nour, after he was imprisoned for standing against former President Mubarak in 2005. He was the first outside politician to get to Cairo at the end of the revolution in February 2011 and made a series of visits to the region in the following months. In September 2012, jointly with the leader of the ALDE group in the European Parliament, Guy Verhofstadt, he was present at the launch of the Arab Leaders for Freedom and Democracy. The meetings were attended among others by Ayman Nour, Amre Moussa and interim Libyan premier Mahmud Gibril.

=== Children's rights ===
McMillan-Scott campaigns for improved children's rights across the EU and has dealt with a number of cross-frontier child abduction cases. He began campaigning for an EU-wide missing child alert, similar to the Amber alert system in the US, with Kate and Gerry McCann, parents of missing Madeleine. A resolution to this effect, in the summer of 2008, was sponsored by McMillan-Scott and gained the support of a majority of MEPs. In the US, the Department of Justice's Amber alert has recovered over 500 abducted children since 2003, 80% within the crucial first 72 hours. France has an identical system but other countries, including the UK, rely on a patchwork of police schemes and children's charities. By 2022 the EU had established its own Amber alert system.

=== Anti-fraud ===
In 1999 McMillan-Scott was singled out by "whistleblower" Paul van Buitenen for his role in the 1999 fall of the European Commission. After McMillan-Scott's discovery of fraud in the EU Commission's tourism unit during the 1990 European Year of Tourism, which McMillan-Scott had initiated, he campaigned for reform and in 1995 caused the first-ever raid by Belgium's fraud squad on the commission. After a report by a panel of independent Wise Men, the commission was later accused of serious irregularities, nepotism and allegations of fraud leading to the resignation of President Jacques Santer and all his commissioners in 1999.

His "Golden Fleece" campaign against fraud and malpractice in the Costa villa and timeshare market won wide support, leading to the EU Timeshare Directive in 1994. He continued to campaign for more secure property rights in the EU's neighbouring states, as buyers move into the Balkans, Turkey and North Africa, where the legal framework is less secure.

=== Single Seat of the European Parliament in Brussels ===
McMillan-Scott was a member of every initiative aimed at ending the European Parliament's monthly four-day sessions in Strasbourg since his election in 1984. In October 2010 he set up the Brussels-Strasbourg Study Group of senior MEPs to provide objective information. Its February 2011 report "A Tale of Two Cities" stated that the additional cost is €180 million and 19,000 tonnes of CO_{2} a year. The Single Seat campaign, aimed at moving all the European Parliament's activities to Brussels. McMillan-Scott was awarded the Parliament magazine's 2012 Award for "Outstanding Contribution" partly for his leadership of the campaign, which resulted in a large majority of MEPs voting for their governments to address the issue.

=== Sustainable food ===
Since 2008 McMillan-Scott has eaten no meat because of its alleged effect on climate change and in December 2009 invited Sir Paul McCartney to a conference called Less Meat = Less Heat, jointly with Dr Rajendra Pachauri, chair of the Intergovernmental Panel on Climate Change. McCartney campaigns for less meat consumption as Meat Free Mondays. A long-term campaigner for reform of the EU's Common Fisheries Policy, in June 2011 McMillan-Scott invited Hugh Fearnley-Whittingstall to Brussels to internationalise the super-chef's Fish Fight against discards. On 3 December 2013, Edward launched EU Food Sense: your right to the right food, a campaign for a sustainable food policy in the EU to replace the wasteful Common Agricultural Policy.

== Leaving the Conservative Party ==
Before the European elections of June 1999, the British Conservative MEPs were allied members of the European People's Party (EPP). After the election, jointly with the then leader of the Conservative Party William Hague, McMillan-Scott negotiated the "Málaga Agreement" which provided for a more detached relationship between the 36 British Conservative MEPs and the newly formed European People's Party–European Democrats (EPP-ED) coalition. This agreement remained in force until the 2009 elections when the Conservatives broke links with the EPP and formed part of the new European Conservatives and Reformists (ECR) group.

Following his re-election to the European Parliament, McMillan-Scott left the EPP group and joined the new ECR group in accordance with the Conservative manifesto for the election. He attended the inaugural meeting of the new group, in Brussels on 24 June, where he expressed the view that he was uncomfortable with some members of the group having possible links with extremist groups.

In July 2009 he successfully stood for re-election as Vice-President of the European Parliament against the nominee of the new ECR group, Michał Kamiński, a Polish MEP from the Law and Justice Party, after discovering Kamiński's past links to an extremist group in Poland. Although he was offered a peerage (membership of the UK House of Lords) by then UK prime minister David Cameron, he declined. As a result, the Conservative whip was withdrawn. McMillan-Scott was then seated as a non-attached (Non-Inscrit) MEP in the European Parliament, though he remained a member of the British Conservative Party.

On 10 August 2009, William Hague wrote a letter to McMillan-Scott, described by the ConservativeHome website as "humiliating". On 15 September 2009, he was expelled from the Conservative Party without notice or reason. The doyen of The Yorkshire Post wrote a stinging attack entitled "Own goal as Tories force out a decent man". McMillan-Scott appealed and issued a series of open letters to his constituents but, after his lawyers declared that he could not expect a fair hearing from the Conservative Party, he wrote to David Cameron on 12 March 2010 outlining his reasons for resigning his appeal. The vilification of McMillan-Scott by the Conservative Party included the alteration of Wikipedia pages, in an attempt "to airbrush the embarrassing past" of Michał Kamiński, chairman of the ECR. McMillan-Scott also stated that his own article had also been edited in this way. An article published in The Observer newspaper reports edits to the articles made on 25 June 2009 from IP addresses originating in the United Kingdom House of Commons.

=== The rise of the right ===
McMillan-Scott has long studied totalitarianism; his opposition to the Soviet system was shared by many Conservatives. However, with the transition to democracy he found that increasingly the Conservative Party saw European Union enlargement as a means to dismembering the EU. It began to make common cause with what McMillan-Scott saw as rightist groups and factions in the new democracies. Through his family's background, McMillan-Scott was alarmed at what he saw as the rise of disguised extremism and forms of neo-fascism. Time magazine's cover story after the European elections of 2009 reported that Europe had made a far right turn, covering the rise of the right in ten EU countries. McMillan-Scott's rejection of David Cameron's new ECR group and his successful stand as an independent vice-president against Michał Kamiński finally led to his break with the Conservative Party.

== Joining the Liberal Democrats ==
On 12 March 2010 McMillan-Scott joined the Liberal Democrats, as he felt that they provided a more suitable home with a focus on human rights and an internationalist agenda. The Liberal Democrats were a member of the Group of the Alliance of Liberals and Democrats for Europe (ALDE) in the European Parliament, which McMillan-Scott formally joined on 17 May. He was nominated by the Liberal Democrat MEPs, and then the ALDE group, as a candidate for vice-president in January 2012 and was then successfully re-elected. He described the Cameron–Clegg coalition as "the happiest moment in my political life: Liberal Democrats have tamed the Conservative extremists".

== UK Parliament candidacies ==
At the 2015 general election, McMillan-Scott was the Liberal Democrat 'media' or 'paper' candidate for the Yorkshire parliamentary seat of Normanton, Pontefract and Castleford. The seat was retained by the Labour Party candidate Yvette Cooper MP with a 15,428 majority.

In May 2017 he fought the West Worcestershire parliamentary seat during the snap general election for the Liberal Democrats, again as a 'media' or 'paper' candidate. He came third with 9% of the vote.

== Personal life ==
McMillan-Scott married a child rights lawyer, Henrietta, in 1972. They have two daughters (Lucinda, born 1973, and Arabella, born 1976) and four granddaughters (Edie, born 1999, Esme, born 2001, Sylvia, born 2012, and Matilda, born 2016). His home is near Pershore, Worcestershire, where his family moved from Yorkshire in the 18th century.

== Articles ==
- "Secret atrocities of Chinese regime", Yorkshire Post, 13 June 2006

== Documentaries ==
He appeared in Transmission 6–10 (2009), and Red Reign: The Bloody Harvest of China's Prisoners (2013).

European Parliament
New constituency	Member of the European Parliament for York; 1984–1994	Constituency abolished
New constituency	Member of the European Parliament for North Yorkshire; 1994–1999	Constituency abolished
New constituency	Member of the European Parliament for Yorkshire and the Humber; 1999–2014	Succeeded by Jane Collins
Party political offices
Preceded by Tom Spencer	Leader of the Conservatives in the European Parliament; 1997–2001	Succeeded by Jonathan Evans
Political offices
Preceded by	Fourth Vice-President of the European Parliament; 2004–2009	Succeeded by Miguel Ángel Martínez Martínez
Preceded by Diana Wallis	Twelfth Vice-President of the European Parliament; 2009–2012	Succeeded by Oldřich Vlasák
Preceded by Isabelle Durant	Eighth Vice-President of the European Parliament; 2012–2014	Succeeded by Sylvie Guillaume
