= Neil Balfour =

British politician (born 1944)

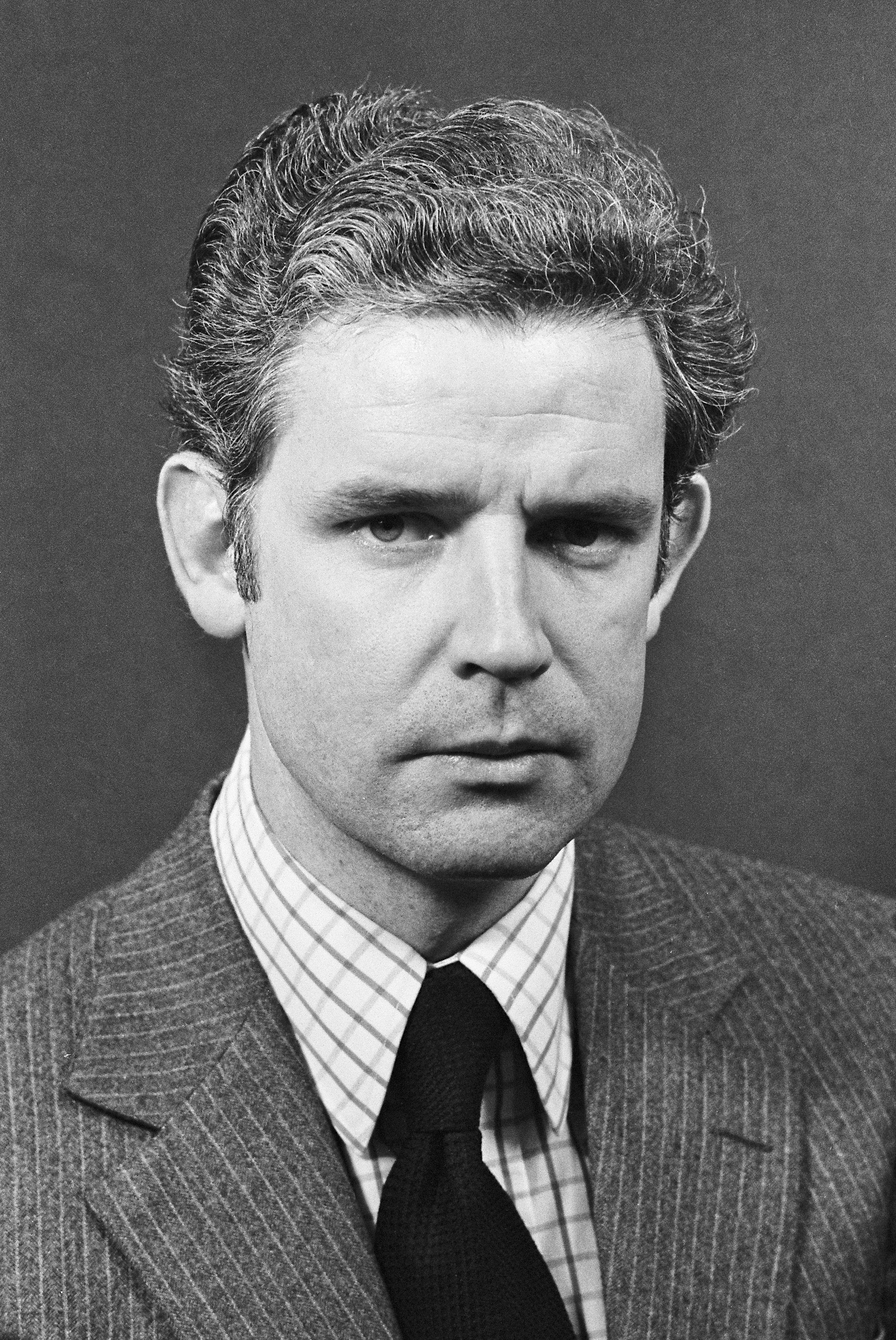

Member of the European Parliament for Yorkshire North
- In office 1979–1983

Personal details
- Born: 12 August 1944 (age 82) Lima, Peru
- Party: Conservative
- Spouses: Princess Elizabeth of Yugoslavia (m. 1969; div. 1978) Serena Mary Spencer-Churchill Russell (after 1978)
- Children: Nicholas Augustus Roxburgh Balfour
- Education: Ampleforth College; Eton College
- Alma mater: University College, Oxford

Neil Roxburgh Balfour (born 12 August 1944) is a British merchant banker, financier and politician. He was the member of the European Parliament for Yorkshire North from 1979 to 1983.

== Early life ==
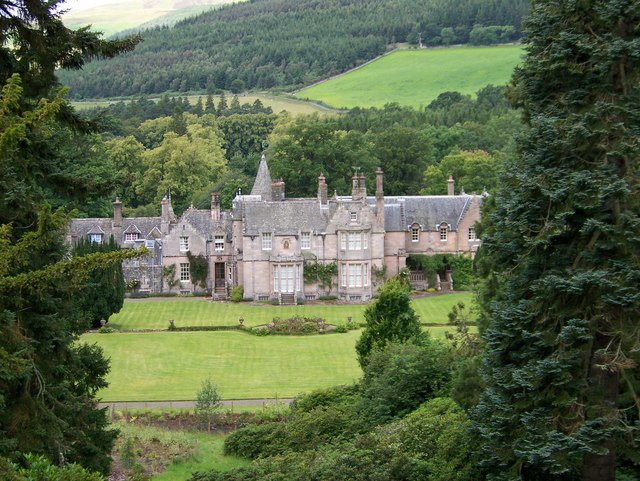
Dawyck House, Balfour family country residence

Balfour was born on 12 August 1944 in Lima, Peru, where his father was a merchant and a polo player. He is the son of Archibald Roxburgh Balfour of Dawyck (1883–1958), a member of the Scottish landed gentry, by his second wife, Lilian Helen (née Cooper) Balfour (d. 1989). Neil's line of the Balfour family owned Dawyck House. His father, who was awarded the Military Cross, was a Captain in the Lothians and Border Horse Yeomanry.

His older brother Christopher Roxburgh Balfour was born in 1941, and his sister Janet Roxburgh Balfour (b. 1943) married David John Cecil Berens.

Balfour‘s paternal grandparents were merchant and shopowner Alexander Balfour of Dawyck and his wife, Janet Roxburgh, the sister of Archibald Roxburgh and an aunt of J. F. Roxburgh. His maternal grandfather was Maxwell Dennison Cooper.

He was educated at Ampleforth College and University College, Oxford, where he graduated with a B.A. degree.

== Career ==
In 1968, he was admitted to Middle Temple and became entitled to practise as a barrister.

Balfour was the Conservative Party candidate for Chester-le-Street at a by-election in March 1973, a seat that the party had little chance of winning. Balfour was candid about his chances but hoped to come a strong second, despite his campaign being based in a caravan in a garden. In the event, the Conservative vote collapsed to the Liberals and he lost his deposit; the Labour campaign accused the Liberals of dirty tricks but regarded Balfour as an honourable opponent.

After fighting the Chester-le-Street seat again in the February 1974 general election, Balfour moved jobs to join the European Banking Co. Ltd as an assistant manager. He was an Executive Director from 1980 to 1983. In the October 1974 general election he fought Hayes and Harlington, and he was elected to the European Parliament in the 1979 European Parliament elections from the Yorkshire North constituency.

In the European Parliament, Balfour concentrated on trade policy. He attacked member state governments for lacking any will to remove state aids to industry and to institute free trade. As budget spokesman for the Conservative MEPs, he attacked the European Community's budgeting process but, in October 1981, joined with other Conservative MEPs in signing a letter calling on the UK to join the European Monetary System. In December 1982, he made an impressive speech attacking the MEPs voting to withdraw a budget rebate for the United Kingdom that had been accepted by the European Council. However, the next year, he led a more moderate group in supporting a short freeze in payment of the rebate because he worried that opposing it would lead the Parliament to vote to stop payments altogether.

=== Ryedale ===
Balfour stood down at the 1984 European Parliament election. He had been appointed Chairman of the York Trust Ltd in 1983, which later became York Mount Group. However, he did not give up Parliamentary ambitions. John Spence, the Conservative MP for Ryedale (part of his former European Parliament constituency), died in 1986, and Balfour was selected to defend the seat in a by-election.

The by-election took place at a time when the Conservatives were unpopular and the Liberals nominated a popular local teacher, Elizabeth Shields. On polling day, Shields won the seat comfortably. Balfour returned to merchant banking, and from 1991 was Chairman of Mermaid Overseas Ltd. In 1999 he became involved with the emerging Polish market as a Director of Mostostal Warszawa SA, and Chief Executive Officer from 2000 to 2002.

=== Policy stance ===
In 2000 he wrote a letter to The Spectator in which he declared "as a committed Europhile" that the best solution would be to allow Britain to opt into EU laws it liked, and supported the call from Conrad Black for Britain to negotiate membership of the North American Free Trade Agreement.

== Personal life ==
In 1969, Balfour married Princess Elizabeth of Yugoslavia in London. Princess Elizabeth is the only daughter of Prince Paul of Yugoslavia and his wife, Princess Olga of Greece and Denmark. Her older brothers were Prince Nicholas and Prince Alexander of Yugoslavia. They have a son:

- Nicholas Augustus Roxburgh Balfour (b. 6 June 1970) married Jonkvrouw Stéphanie de Brouwer (b. 1971) in 2000. They have four daughters:
  - India Lily Balfour (b. 17 October 2002)
  - Gloria Elizabeth Balfour (b. 11 November 2005)
  - Olympia Rose Balfour (b. 27 June 2007)
  - Georgia Veronika Stefania Balfour (b. 10 September 2010)

On November 4, 1978, he married Serena Mary Spencer-Churchill Russell (daughter of Lady Sarah Spencer-Churchill), previously married to Neil McConnell, a grandson of Avon Products founder David H. McConnell, in 1968. Serena was the daughter of American newspaper publisher Edwin F. Russell and Lady Sarah Spencer-Churchill, daughter of John Spencer-Churchill, 10th Duke of Marlborough.

With Serena, Balfour is the father of:

- Consuelo Lily Balfour (b. 1979)
- Alastair Albert David Balfour (b. 1981)

In 2004, the Balfours lived at Warwick Square in London, England.
