= Uvedale Corbett (politician) =

British politician (1909–2005)

Lieutenant-Colonel Uvedale Shobdon Corbett CBE DSO DL (12 September 1909 – 1 September 2005) was a British soldier, politician and businessman. He was Conservative Member of Parliament (MP) for Ludlow from 1945 to 1951.

Corbett was born near Shrewsbury on 12 September 1909 and educated at Wellington College and the Royal Military Academy at Woolwich. He was commissioned into the Royal Artillery in 1929. He acquired the nickname 'Streak' at the Army School of Equitation at Weedon.

In the Second World War, he was awarded the DSO for his actions during the capture and defence of the Orne Bridgehead during the Normandy campaign in August 1944.

After representing Ludlow in Parliament from 1945 to 1951, he went into the poultry industry and co-founded the West Midlands Broiler Hatchery and, in 1960, Sun Valley Poultry. He was president of the British Poultry Federation from 1979 to 1984 and was appointed CBE in 1984 for services to the industry.

He married Veronica Whitehead in 1935; they divorced in 1952. They had two sons and a daughter. He married Patricia Jane Walker in 1953. She died in 1985, and he married Peggy Roberts in 1987.

Parliament of the United Kingdom
Preceded by George Windsor-Clive	Member of Parliament for Ludlow; 1945 – 1951	Succeeded by Christopher Holland-Martin
