= 1956 Chester-le-Street by-election =

The 1956 Chester-le-Street by-election was a parliamentary by-election held for the British House of Commons constituency of Chester-le-Street on 27 September 1956.

== Vacancy ==
The by-election had been caused by the death aged 47 years on 25 June 1956 of the sitting Labour Member of Parliament (MP) Patrick Bartley. Bartley had held the seat since 1950.

== Candidates ==
In what was to be a straight fight between the two main parties, Labour chose Norman Pentland, a colliery checkweighman from Fatfield, County Durham as their candidate and the Conservatives selected the journalist William Rees-Mogg.

== Issues ==
The main political topic of the day was the Suez Crisis but the cost of living and the performance of the government on the economy were also mentioned by Labour as issues in the campaign.

== Result ==
In what was a safe Labour seat during a period of Conservative government, Pentland was easily elected with a majority of 21,287 votes.

Chester-le-Street by-election, 1956
Party	Candidate	Votes	%	±%
Labour	Norman Pentland	27,912	80.8	+4.5
Conservative	William Rees-Mogg	6,625	19.2	−4.5
Majority		27,287	61.6	+9.0
Turnout		34,537	65.0	−14.6
Labour hold		Swing		

== See also ==
- List of United Kingdom by-elections
- United Kingdom by-election records
