= Edmund Marshall =

British politician and churchman (1940–2023)

Member of Parliament for Goole
- In office 27 May 1971 – 13 May 1983
- Preceded by: George Jeger
- Succeeded by: Constituency abolished

Personal details
- Born: Edmund Ian Marshall; 31 May 1940 Manchester, England
- Died: 5 October 2023 (aged 83) Norton Hawkfield, Somerset, England
- Party: Liberal (before 1967); Labour (1967–85); SDP (1985–88); Liberal Democrats (after 1988)
- Spouses: Margaret Antill (m. 1969; died 2017); Margaret Masding (m. 2019)
- Children: 1
- Education: Magdalen College, Oxford; University of Liverpool

Edmund Ian Marshall (31 May 1940 – 5 October 2023) was a British politician and churchman. After beginning his career as a Liberal councillor in Wallasey in the 1960s, he joined the Labour Party and was elected Member of Parliament for Goole at a 1971 by-election. He held the seat until 1983. He later joined the Social Democratic Party (SDP), which merged with the Liberals in 1988 to become the Liberal Democrats.

== Early life ==
Marshall was born in Manchester on 31 May 1940. He was educated at Humberstone Foundation School (also known as Clee Grammar School for Boys for Boys, which became the comprehensive Matthew Humberstone School in September 1973) on Clee Road in Old Clee, Cleethorpes, and Magdalen College, Oxford, where he took double first class honours in mathematics and was awarded a University Junior Mathematical Prize in 1961. Marshall gained a PhD from the University of Liverpool in 1965. He became a mathematics university lecturer and a Methodist local preacher, also serving as Vice-president of the Methodist Conference in 1992.

== Parliamentary career ==
Marshall was a Liberal Party councillor on Wallasey Borough Council 1963-65 and parliamentary candidate for Louth in 1964 and 1966, but joined the Labour Party in 1967.

In a 1971 by-election, Marshall was elected as the Member of Parliament (MP) for Goole. From 1976 to 1979, he served as Parliamentary Private Secretary to the Home Secretary, and as Chair of the Select Committee on Trade and Industry.

As the Chair of the Select Committee on Trade and Industry, and as Chair of the Select Committee on the Channel Tunnel Bill, Marshall played a notable role in the development of Channel Tunnel project.

Marshall left Parliament in 1983, when the Goole constituency was abolished in boundary changes. He stood to be the Labour candidate in the seat of Doncaster North, but lost the selection to Michael Welsh.

== After Parliament ==
In 1985, Marshall transferred to the Social Democratic Party, and subsequently became a member of the Liberal Democrats. He fought Bridlington for the SDP in 1987, coming second. In 2015 he became a Trustee of the Parliamentary Outreach Trust, and became vice chairman of the trust in 2019.

From 1997 to 2007, he advised the Church of England Bishop of Wakefield on ecumenical matters, and from 2000 to 2015 was a member of the General Synod of the Church of England.

Marshall was the author of two published books: Parliament and the Public (Macmillan, 1982) and Business and Society (Routledge, 1993).

From 1984 to 2000, he was a lecturer in Management Science at the University of Bradford School of Management.

== Personal life and death ==
In 1969 he married Margaret Pamela Antill in Enfield. The couple had a daughter together and remained married until Antill's death in 2017. In 2019 he married Margaret Anthea Masding (née Martin Smith) in Oxford.

Marshall died on 5 October 2023, at the age of 83.

== Sources ==
- Times Guide to the House of Commons, 1966 & 1979
- Leigh Rayment's Historical List of MPs
- Yorkshire and the Humber Liberals Democrats website

Parliament of the United Kingdom
Preceded by George Jeger	Member of Parliament for Goole; 1971–1983	Constituency abolished
