= Jasper More =

British politician

Sir Jasper More DL

Member of Parliament for Ludlow
- In office 16 November 1960 – 7 April 1979
- Preceded by: Christopher Holland-Martin
- Succeeded by: Eric Cockeram

Personal details
- Born: 31 July 1907 Chelsea, London, England
- Died: 28 October 1987 (aged 80) Clun, Shropshire, England
- Party: Conservative
- Spouse: Clare Hope-Edwards (m. 1944)
- Education: King's College, Cambridge
- Occupation: Farmer, lawyer, landowner, politician

Sir Jasper More DL (31 July 1907 – 28 October 1987) was a British Conservative Party politician, the son of Sir Thomas Jasper Mytton More (died 1947), a Shropshire landowner, and Lady Norah Browne, daughter of Henry Browne, 5th Marquess of Sligo. He was knighted in 1979.

More was educated at Eton College and King's College, Cambridge, becoming a barrister, called by Lincoln's Inn and Middle Temple in 1930. His career at the bar ended with the outbreak of World War II. He was a civilian employee of the Ministry of Economic Warfare and the Ministry of Aircraft Production and Light Metals Control until 1942, was commissioned as an Army legal officer on the General List in 1943, and was in Italy until 1945 and with the military government of the Dodecanese until 1946. In 1944, he married Clare Hope-Edwards, also a Shropshire landowner. They had no children.

He was a landowner and farmer and chaired the Shropshire branch of the Country Landowners' Association 1955–1960. He became a Shropshire County Councillor in 1958, and was later a deputy lieutenant and justice of the peace.

During the 1960s More joined the Conservative Monday Club, and he was elected Member of Parliament for Ludlow in a 1960 by-election, a seat he held until 1979, preceding Eric Cockeram. He introduced the Deer Act, 1963 to protect deer not kept in enclosed parks. More was made a government whip in February 1964, then become an opposition whip, and again for the government benches from 1970 to 1971, when he resigned in disagreement with the government's policy on the European Economic Community. He was still a member of the Monday Club in May 1975.

More was politically unambitious, gaining his whip posts largely through conscientious attendance. He principally devoted himself to life as a country squire. He authored several books, including The Saving of Income Tax, Surtax and Death Duties, The Land of Italy, and the Shell Guide to English Villages.

Parliament of the United Kingdom
Preceded by Christopher Holland-Martin	Member of Parliament for Ludlow; 1960–1979	Succeeded by Eric Cockeram
Political offices
Preceded by Alan Fitch	Vice-Chamberlain of the Household; 1970–1971	Succeeded by Bernard Weatherill
