= George Jeger =

British Labour Party politician

George Jeger (19 March 1903 – 6 January 1971) was a British Labour Party politician. He served as the Member of Parliament for Winchester from 1945 to 1950, normally a safe Conservative seat. In 1950 he was elected as the MP for Goole, which he held until his death in 1971.

He previously worked as a bank official and a freelance journalist, and served as a member of Shoreditch Borough Council from 1926 to 1940, and as Mayor of Shoreditch from 1937 to 1938.

He was the brother of Santo Jeger, brother-in-law of Lena Jeger, and father of Jenny Jeger. His nephew Peter Prinsley is also a Labour MP.

Parliament of the United Kingdom
Preceded by Gerald Palmer	Member of Parliament for Winchester; 1945–1950	Succeeded by Peter Smithers
New constituency	Member of Parliament for Goole; 1950–1971	Succeeded by Edmund Marshall
