= Muriel Gammans =

British politician (1898–1989)

Ann Muriel, Lady Gammans

Member of Parliament for Hornsey
- In office 30 May 1957 – 30 March 1966
- Preceded by: Sir David Gammans, Bt.
- Succeeded by: Hugh Rossi

Personal details
- Born: 6 March 1898
- Died: 28 December 1989 (aged 91)
- Party: Conservative
- Spouse: Sir David Gammans, Bt.

Ann Muriel, Lady Gammans (6 March 1898 – 28 December 1989) was a British Conservative politician. She was elected member of parliament for Hornsey at a 1957 by-election following the death of her husband Sir David Gammans, and served until her retirement at the 1966 general election.

== Bibliography ==
- Leigh Rayment's Historical List of MPs

Parliament of the United Kingdom
Preceded by Sir David Gammans, Bt.	Member of Parliament for Hornsey; 1957–1966	Succeeded by Hugh Rossi
