= David Gammans =

British politician (1895–1957)

Sir David Gammans Bt
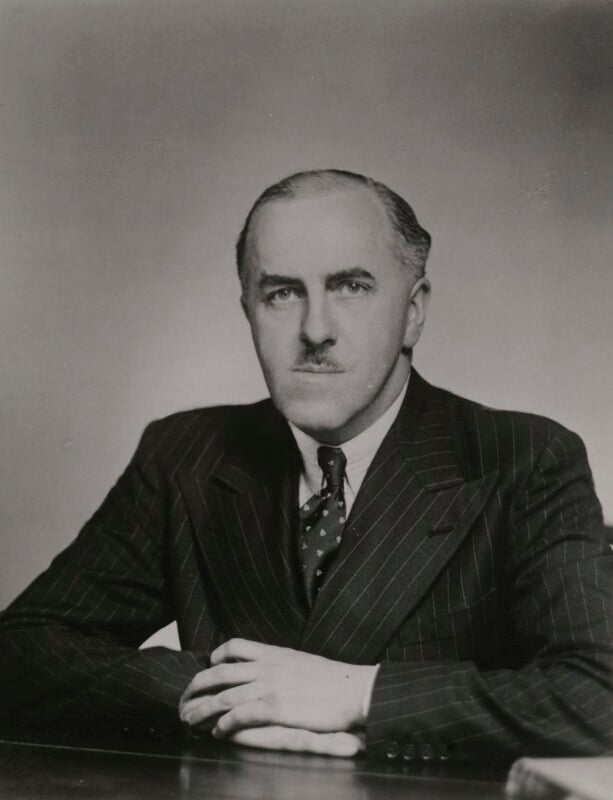
- Gammans in 1949

Member of Parliament for Hornsey
- In office 28 May 1941 – 8 February 1957
- Preceded by: Euan Wallace
- Succeeded by: Muriel Gammans

Personal details
- Born: Leonard David Gammans; 10 November 1895
- Died: 8 February 1957 (aged 61)
- Party: Conservative
- Spouse: Muriel Paul (m. 1917)
- Education: Portsmouth Grammar School

Sir Leonard David Gammans, 1st Baronet (10 November 1895 – 8 February 1957), known as David Gammans, was a British Conservative Party politician.

Gammans was educated at Portsmouth Grammar School and served with the Royal Field Artillery 1914–1918. He was in the Colonial Service in Malaya, 1920-1934, and attached to the British Embassy in Tokyo, 1926–1928. In 1930 he toured in India, Europe and America and, on retiring from the Colonial Service, lectured in the US and Canada. he was Director and Secretary of the Land Settlement Association, 1934–1939.

He was first elected to Parliament at a by-election in 1941, following the death of the Conservative Member of Parliament (MP) for Hornsey, Euan Wallace. Gammans held the North London seat until his own death in 1957, aged 61. The resulting 1957 Hornsey by-election was won for the Conservatives by his wife Muriel, known as Lady Gammans.

Following the Second World War, Gammans was sent to Sarawak with Labour MP David Rees-Williams to assess view on the territory becoming a British colony.

In Winston Churchill's 1951–55 government, he served as Assistant Postmaster-General, under Earl De La Warr.

In 1952 there was "public outrage" that the Post Office cats had not received a pay rise since 1873. The following year, a question in the House of Commons asking Gammans, "when the allowance payable for the maintenance of cats in his department was last raised?" Gammans responded, "There is, I am afraid, a certain amount of industrial chaos in The Post Office cat world. Allowances vary in different places, possibly according to the alleged efficiency of the animals and other factors. It has proved impossible to organise any scheme for payment by results or output bonus ... there has been a general wage freeze since July 1918, but there have been no complaints!"

Gammans was made a baronet, of Hornsey in the County of Middlesex on 24 January 1956. The baronetcy became extinct on his death.

Parliament of the United Kingdom
Preceded by Euan Wallace	Member of Parliament for Hornsey; 1941–1957	Succeeded by Lady Gammans
Baronetage of the United Kingdom
New creation	Baronet (of Hornsey); 1956–1957	Extinct
