= 1971 Goole by-election =

UK Parliamentary by-election

The 1971 Goole by-election of 27 May 1971 was held after the death of Labour Member of Parliament (MP) George Jeger. The seat was retained by Labour.

== Result ==
Goole By Election, 1971
Party	Candidate	Votes	%	±%
Labour	Edmund Marshall	24,323	68.88	+8.66
Conservative	Ian Bloomer	10,990	31.12	−8.66
Majority		13,333	37.76	+17.33
Turnout		35,313		
Labour hold		Swing		

== Previous result ==
General election 1970: Goole
Party	Candidate	Votes	%	±%
Labour	George Jeger	26,424	60.22	
Conservative	Ian Bloomer	17,457	39.78	
Majority		8,967	20.44	
Turnout		43,881	69.47	
Labour hold		Swing		
