= Christopher Holland-Martin =

British politician (1910-1960)

Member of Parliament for Ludlow
- In office 1951–1960
- Preceded by: Uvedale Corbett
- Succeeded by: Jasper More

Personal details
- Born: 16 November 1910
- Died: 5 April 1960 (aged 49)
- Party: Conservative
- Spouse: Lady Anne Cavendish MBE (m. 1951)
- Profession: Politician

Christopher John Holland-Martin (16 November 1910 – 5 April 1960) was a British banker and Conservative Party politician.

== Early career ==
The son of the Chairman of Martins Bank, Holland-Martin was educated at Eton and Balliol College, Oxford. He followed his father's profession but in 1939 was commissioned in the Royal Fusiliers (Territorial Army). Invalided out of the Army, Holland-Martin was appointed Military Secretary to the Governor-General of New Zealand, Cyril Newall from 1942 to 1944. He briefly held the same post in relation to the Governor of Kenya in 1945.

== Post-war ==
After the war, Holland-Martin was appointed a Director of Martins Bank. He also became involved in politics and was made Joint Honorary Treasurer of the Conservative Party from 1947; two years later he married Lady Anne Cavendish MBE, daughter of the Duke of Devonshire.

== Parliament ==
At the 1951 general election, Holland-Martin was elected as Conservative Member of Parliament for Ludlow. His experience in financial matters was often in evidence in House of Commons debates, although he was generally low profile. He remained involved in business throughout his time in Parliament.

== Disqualification question ==
Validation of Elections (No. 2) Act 1955 (Note: Section 2.)
- Act of Parliament
- Parliament of the United Kingdom
- Long title: An Act to validate the election to the House of Commons of Christopher John Holland-Martin, Esquire, notwithstanding his holding the office of local Director of the Bank of New Zealand, and to indemnify him from any penal consequences which he may have incurred by sitting and voting as a member of that House.
- Citation: 4 & 5 Eliz. 2. c. 12
- Territorial extent: United Kingdom

Dates
- Royal assent: 1 November 1955
- Commencement: 1 November 1955 (Note: The Acts of Parliament (Commencement) Act 1793.)
- Repealed: 12 May 1969 (Note: The Representation of the People Act 1969 (Commencement) Order 1969 (SI 1969/630).)
Other legislation
Repealed by	Representation of the People Act 1969

Status: Repealed

Text of statute as originally enacted

In 1955 he was caught up in a minor constitutional crisis over his local directorship of the Bank of New Zealand. With the bank's shares vested in the Crown, the directorship was technically an 'office of profit under the Crown' and as such a disqualification from the House of Commons. Holland-Martin immediately resigned his office while the law was changed and an act of Parliament, the Validation of Elections (No. 2) Act 1955 (4 & 5 Eliz. 2. c. 12) was passed to indemnify him from the consequences of having acted as a Member of Parliament while disqualified.

== Death ==
Later in the 1950s Holland-Martin became involved in many African-related mining and exploration companies. While on a visit to Southern Rhodesia in January 1960, he suffered a heart attack and was confined to bed at Government House, Salisbury; he was returned to Britain but died at his home in Colwall, Herefordshire in April, aged 49.

== Bibliography ==
- M. Stenton and S. Lees, "Who's Who of British MPs" Vol. IV (Harvester Press, 1981)
- Obituary, The Times, 6 April 1960.
- Genealogy of Robert Martin (1908–1987) a genealogy of the family as in Burke's Peerage. Retrieved 10 August 2007. Christopher Holland-Martin MP was the sixth but fifth surviving son of Robert Martin Holland, later Holland-Martin (R Licence 14 August 1917), and younger brother of Admiral Sir Deric Holland-Martin, who was married to Rosamund Holland-Martin.

Parliament of the United Kingdom
Preceded by Uvedale Corbett	Member of Parliament for Ludlow; 1951–1960	Succeeded by Jasper More
