= 1957 Hornsey by-election =

UK Parliamentary by-election

The 1957 Hornsey by-election of 30 May 1957 was held after the death of Conservative Party MP David Gammans.

The seat was safe, having been won at the 1955 United Kingdom general election by over 12,500 votes

== Result of the previous general election ==
General election 1955: Hornsey
Party	Candidate	Votes	%	±%
Conservative	David Gammans	33,294	60.20	+1.5
Labour	Frederick Evelyn Mostyn	20,568	37.19	−4.1
Communist	George John Jones	1,442	2.61	New
Majority		12,726	23.01	+5.6
Turnout		55,304		
Conservative hold		Swing		

== Result of the by-election ==
The Conservative Party held the seat with a reduced majority.

By-election 1957: Hornsey
Party	Candidate	Votes	%	±%
Conservative	Muriel Gammans	24,169	53.46	−6.74
Labour	Frederick Evelyn Mostyn	21,038	46.54	+9.35
Majority		3,131	6.92	−16.09
Turnout		45,207		
Conservative hold		Swing	-8.0	
