= Norman Pentland =

British politician and coal miner

Member of Parliament for Chester-le-Street
- In office 27 September 1956 – 28 October 1972
- Preceded by: Patrick Bartley
- Succeeded by: Giles Radice

Personal details
- Born: 9 September 1912 Washington, Tyne and Wear, England
- Died: 28 October 1972 (aged 60) Great Lumley, England
- Party: Labour
- Spouse: Ethel Coates (m. 1937)
- Children: 2
- Profession: Miner

Norman Pentland (9 September 1912 – 28 October 1972) was a British politician and coal miner who was the Labour Member of Parliament for Chester-le-Street from 1956 until his death.

== Background ==
Pentland was born in Fatfield, educated at Fatfield County School, and in 1926 became a miner, based at the Harraton Colliery. In 1937, he married Ethel Coates, and they had two sons.

== Political career ==
In 1949, Pentland was elected as a checkweighman, and by this time, he was heavily involved in the Durham Area of the National Union of Mineworkers, and the local Labour Party.

Pentland served on Chester-le-Street Rural District Council, and became its chair in 1952. That same year, he was elected to the executive committee of the Durham Miners. He won a seat in Parliament at the 1956 Chester-le-Street by-election. Described as a political moderate, he held ministerial office as Parliamentary Secretary to the Minister for Pensions from 1964 to 1966, Parliamentary Secretary to the Ministry of Social Security from 1966 to 1968, Under-Secretary of State for Social Services from 1968 to 1969, and Parliamentary Secretary to the Ministry of Posts and Telecommunications from 1969 until 1970.

In both 1971 and 1972, Pentland stood unsuccessfully to become Chair of the Parliamentary Labour Party. On 28 October 1972, some two weeks after his second attempt to become chair, he died at his home in Great Lumley at the age of 60.

Parliament of the United Kingdom
Preceded by Patrick Bartley	Member of Parliament for Chester-le-Street; 1956 – 1972	Succeeded by Giles Radice
