= Goole (constituency) =

Parliamentary constituency in the United Kingdom, 1950–1983

Coordinates: 53.704°N 0.871°W

- Former county constituency for the House of Commons
- County: 1950–1974 West Riding of Yorkshire; 1974–1983 Humberside, South Yorkshire

1950–1983
- Seats: One
- Created from: Pontefract and Don Valley
- Replaced by: Doncaster North, Boothferry, Pontefract & Castleford and Selby

Goole was a parliamentary constituency centred on the town of Goole in the West Riding of Yorkshire which returned one Member of Parliament (MP) to the House of Commons of the Parliament of the United Kingdom, elected by the first-past-the-post voting system.

It was created for the 1950 general election, and abolished for the 1983 general election.

== Boundaries ==
The Municipal Borough of Goole, the Urban District of Knottingley, and the Rural Districts of Goole, Osgoldcross, and Thorne.

== Members of Parliament ==
Election	Member	Party	Notes
1950	George Jeger	Labour	Died January 1971
1971 by-election	Edmund Marshall	Labour	
1983	constituency abolished		

== Election results ==
=== Elections in the 1950s ===
General election 1950: Goole
Party	Candidate	Votes	%	±%
Labour	George Jeger	25,635	60.33	
Conservative	Frederick Farey-Jones	16,853	39.67	
Majority		8,782	20.66	
Turnout		42,488	85.46	
Labour hold		Swing		

General election 1951: Goole
Party	Candidate	Votes	%	±%
Labour	George Jeger	26,088	60.44	
National Liberal	Anthony Marreco	17,073	39.56	
Majority		9,015	20.88	
Turnout		43,161	84.17	
Labour hold		Swing		

General election 1955: Goole
Party	Candidate	Votes	%	±%
Labour	George Jeger	25,420	62.19	
National Liberal	Gavin Welby	15,456	37.81	
Majority		9,964	24.38	
Turnout		40,876	78.32	
Labour hold		Swing		

General election 1959: Goole
Party	Candidate	Votes	%	±%
Labour	George Jeger	26,352	61.38	
National Liberal	Douglas Sisson	16,581	38.62	
Majority		9,771	22.76	
Turnout		42,933	80.71	
Labour hold		Swing		

=== Elections in the 1960s ===
General election 1964: Goole
Party	Candidate	Votes	%	±%
Labour	George Jeger	25,256	60.34	
National Liberal	Cyril Donald Chapman	15,435	36.88	
Communist	William Carr	1,165	2.78	New
Majority		9,821	23.46	
Turnout		41,856	77.44	
Labour hold		Swing		

General election 1966: Goole
Party	Candidate	Votes	%	±%
Labour	George Jeger	26,117	63.64	
National Liberal	Richard M. Whitfield	13,969	34.04	
Communist	William Carr	952	2.32	
Majority		12,148	29.60	
Turnout		41,038	73.14	
Labour hold		Swing		

=== Elections in the 1970s ===
General election 1970: Goole
Party	Candidate	Votes	%	±%
Labour	George Jeger	26,424	60.22	
Conservative	Ian R. Bloomer	17,457	39.78	
Majority		8,967	20.44	
Turnout		43,881	69.47	
Labour hold		Swing		

1971 Goole by-election
Party	Candidate	Votes	%	±%
Labour	Edmund Marshall	24,323	68.88	+8.66
Conservative	Ian R. Bloomer	10,990	31.12	−8.66
Majority		13,333	37.76	+17.33
Turnout		35,313		
Labour hold		Swing		

General election February 1974: Goole
Party	Candidate	Votes	%	±%
Labour	Edmund Marshall	30,245	61.21	
Conservative	NP Kemp	17,020	34.44	
Independent	JT Clarkson	2,150	4.35	New
Majority		13,225	26.77	
Turnout		49,415	77.18	
Labour hold		Swing		

General election October 1974: Goole
Party	Candidate	Votes	%	±%
Labour	Edmund Marshall	26,804	59.84	
Conservative	NP Kemp	12,707	28.37	
Liberal	JT Clarkson	5,285	11.80	New
Majority		14,097	31.47	
Turnout		44,796	69.31	
Labour hold		Swing		

General election 1979: Goole
Party	Candidate	Votes	%	±%
Labour	Edmund Marshall	27,690	57.56	
Conservative	F Higgins	16,439	34.17	
Liberal	A Davidson	3,976	8.27	
Majority		11,251	23.39	
Turnout		48,105	72.84	
Labour hold		Swing		
