= Patrick Bartley =

British coal miner, civil servant and politician

Patrick Bartley (24 March 1909 – 25 June 1956) was a British coal miner, civil servant and politician. He served as Labour Party Member of Parliament for Chester-le-Street from 1950 until his early death.

== Mining career ==
Bartley was born in Washington, then in County Durham. He went to St Joseph's Elementary School in the town, leaving at the age of 14 to become a coalminer. He spent his spare time studying, and in 1930 he was accepted for a two-year course at the Catholic Workers' College, which was attached to the University of Oxford.

== Politics ==
From 1933 Bartley was Branch Secretary of the Mineworkers' union at his pit. He also became active in politics in the Labour Party, and in 1934 was elected to Washington Urban District Council. In 1937 he was elected instead to Durham County Council, on which he served for 12 years. He also acted as agent to Jack Lawson, the Labour Member of Parliament for Chester-le-Street.

== Civil service ==
In 1942, Bartley left the coal face to become Assistant Labour Director at the Northern "B" Region of the Ministry of Fuel and Power. When the coal mines were nationalised in 1947, he became Conciliation Officer for the National Coal Board Northern Division.

== Election to Parliament ==
After Jack Lawson received a peerage in 1949, Bartley was selected to follow him as Labour candidate for Chester-le-Street. At the 1950 general election he was elected with a majority even bigger than Lawson's, 24,969. He used his position in Parliament to support nationalisation of the mines, arguing that it had produced a greater sense of communal responsibility than ever before. He also criticised discrimination against Roman Catholics in Northern Ireland.

During the 1951 general election campaign, Bartley was forced to go into hospital due to ill health; his campaign was conducted by volunteers. This proved no disadvantage as his majority of 24,879 was one of the highest in the country. In May 1952, Bartley's championing of the case of a constituent denied compassionate leave from the army to see his dying brother was so forceful that the Prime Minister Winston Churchill had to step in to defend the Minister involved.

== Death ==
Bartley also took up the issue of agricultural land in his constituency which had been lost to mining subsidence, and he continued to raise detailed issues about the mining industry. However, his health continued to be poor and he was again admitted to hospital in June 1956. Three days after his discharge, he died suddenly.

Parliament of the United Kingdom
Preceded by Jack Lawson	Member of Parliament for Chester-le-Street; 1950 – 1956	Succeeded by Norman Pentland
