= Giles Radice =

British politician and author (1936–2022)

The Right Honourable The Lord Radice PC
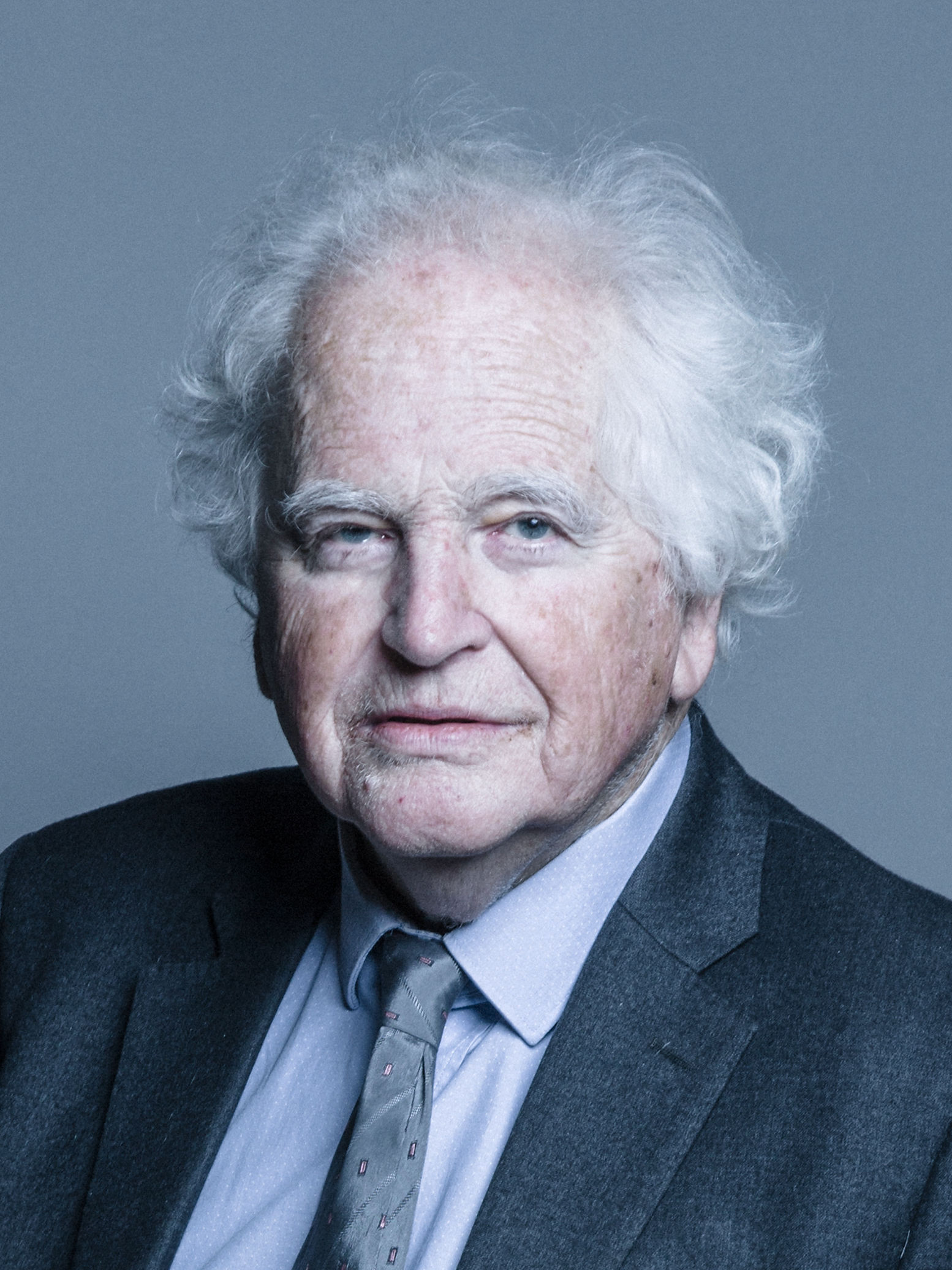
- Official portrait, 2018

Chairman of the Treasury Select Committee
- In office 17 July 1997 – 7 June 2001
- Prime Minister: Tony Blair
- Succeeded by: John McFall

Shadow Secretary of State for Education and Science
- In office 2 October 1983 – 13 July 1987
- Leader: Neil Kinnock
- Preceded by: Neil Kinnock
- Succeeded by: Jack Straw

Member of the House of Lords
- Lord Temporal
- Life peerage 16 July 2001 – 1 August 2022

Member of Parliament for North Durham Chester-le-Street (1973–1983)
- In office 1 March 1973 – 14 May 2001
- Preceded by: Norman Pentland
- Succeeded by: Kevan Jones

Personal details
- Born: Giles Heneage Radice; 4 October 1936 Belgravia, London, England
- Died: 25 August 2022 (aged 85) Gelston, Lincolnshire, England
- Party: Labour
- Spouses: Penelope Angus (m. 1959; div. 1969); Lisanne Koch (m. 1971)
- Children: 2
- Education: Magdalen College, Oxford
- Radice's voice from the BBC programme Westminster Hour, 26 April 2009

Giles Heneage Radice, Baron Radice (4 October 1936 – 25 August 2022) was a British Labour Party politician and author. He served as a Member of Parliament (MP) from 1973 to 2001, representing part of County Durham, and then as a life peer in the House of Lords from 2001 until shortly before his death in 2022.

== Early life ==
Radice was born in Belgravia, London on 4 October 1936, the son of a civil servant in the Indian Government, Lawrence Radice. His mother, Patricia, was the daughter of Conservative politician Arthur Heneage. Radice was educated at Winchester College and Magdalen College, Oxford. His national service was with the Coldstream Guards. He then worked as a research officer for the General and Municipal Workers' Union and was chair of the Young Fabians from 1967 to 1968.

== Parliamentary career ==
Radice first stood for Parliament at Chippenham in 1964 and 1966, but came third each time. He was elected Labour Member of Parliament for Chester-le-Street from a 1973 by-election to 1983 and then North Durham until his retirement in 2001.

Radice served as Education spokesman in the Labour Shadow Cabinet under Neil Kinnock in the 1980s. As chairman of the Treasury Select Committee, Radice helped make the monetary policy committee of the Bank of England accountable to both Parliament and the people for its decisions over interest rates. He was a member of the House of Lords European Union Sub-Committee on external affairs until March 2015.

A europhile, Radice was one of only five Labour MPs to vote for the third reading of the Maastricht Treaty in 1993, defying his party Whip, which was to abstain.

He was made a life peer as Baron Radice, of Chester-le-Street in the County of Durham, on 16 July 2001. He retired from the House of Lords on 1 August 2022.

== Writing and political ideas ==
As an advocate for Labour to ditch traditional dogmas, Radice has been described as a forerunner to Tony Blair. In his 1989 book Labour's Path to Power: The New Revisionism, Radice set out his vision for a modernised Labour Party, which included abandoning Clause IV of the party constitution. His 1992 pamphlet "Southern Discomfort" also made a case for reform, arguing that Labour did not appear supportive of economic aspiration, and this was costing them support from working class voters in Southern England, particularly London.

Philip Stephens later wrote in the Financial Times,

At that time, Giles Radice, then an MP, wrote a brilliant essay on what he called Labour's 'southern discomfort'. The party would not win, he argued, unless and until it managed to connect its ambitions for social justice with the individualistic aspirations of the voters in southern England. Here was the template for Mr Blair.

Radice returned to this theme following Labour's 2010 defeat: his "Southern Discomfort Again" pamphlet (with Patrick Diamond) found that voters perceived that Labour had run out of steam, were out of touch (particularly on immigration), unfair and poorly led. In this pamphlet and in "Southern Discomfort: One Year On" (2011), Radice warned that the 'southern problem' is more than geographical: social change means that Labour support collapsed in other areas, including the Midlands. A committed pro-European, Radice was a leading member both of the European Movement and Britain in Europe, and wrote a polemic called Offshore in 1992, in which he put the case for Britain in Europe.

After his retirement as an MP in 2001 Radice, wrote Friends and Rivals, an acclaimed triple biography of three modernisers from an earlier generation—Roy Jenkins, Denis Healey, and Anthony Crosland—arguing that their failure to work more closely together had harmed the modernising cause. This was followed by The Tortoise and the Hares, a comparative biography of Clement Attlee, Ernest Bevin, Stafford Cripps, Hugh Dalton and Herbert Morrison. Trio: Inside the Blair, Brown, Mandelson Project was published in 2010. In a review of Trio, Andrew Blick wrote that, "With his previous work Friends and Rivals (2002) and The Tortoise and the Hares (2008), Radice developed a distinctive approach to contemporary history, using group biography ....Radice adds to his historical approach not only a readable writing style, but the judgements of an experienced Labour politician."

== Other positions ==
Lord Radice had been a member of the advisory board of the Centre for British Studies of Berlin's Humboldt University since 1998. He was also a member of the Fabian Society. Radice was a chair of the British Association for Central and Eastern Europe (BACEE), and chair of the European Movement, from 1995 to 2001. He was also a chairman of Policy Network, the international progressive thinktank based in London.

== Personal life ==
Radice married Penelope Angus in 1959; they had two daughters and divorced in 1969. In 1971, he married historian Lisanne Koch. He was a longtime resident of Camden, living in Gloucester Crescent in the 1960s before relocating to Parliament Hill.

Radice died from cancer at his home in Gelston, Lincolnshire, on 25 August 2022, at age 85.

== Books ==
- Divide and rule : the Industrial Relations Bill. (with J. O. N. Vickers) Fabian Society, London. 1971 ISBN 0-7163-0406-6
- Community socialism. Fabian Society, London. 1979
- Equality and quality: a socialist plan for education. Fabian Society, London. 1986
- Labour's Path to Power: The New Revisionism Palgrave Macmillan, 1989, ISBN 978-0333480724
- Offshore: Britain and the European Idea I.B.Tauris, 1992, ISBN 978-1-85043-362-0
- The New Germans Michael Joseph, 1995, ISBN 978-0718137809
- Friends and Rivals Octagon Press, 2003, ISBN 978-0-349-11734-8
- Diaries 1980–2001: The Political Diaries of Giles Radice Orion, 2004, ISBN 978-0-297-84900-1
- The Tortoise and the Hares: Attlee, Bevin, Cripps, Dalton, Morrison Politicos Publishing, 2008, ISBN 978-1-84275-223-4
- Trio: Inside the Blair, Brown, Mandelson Project I.B.Tauris, 2010, ISBN 978-1-84885-445-1
- Southern Discomfort Fabian Society, 1992, 978-0716305552
- More Southern Discomfort : a year on – taxing and spending Fabian Society, 1993
- Southern Discomfort Again (with Patrick Diamond) Policy Network, 2010
- Southern Discomfort Again: One Year On (with Patrick Diamond), Policy Network, 2011

Parliament of the United Kingdom
Preceded by Norman Pentland	Member of Parliament for Chester-le-Street; 1973–1983	Constituency abolished
New constituency	Member of Parliament for North Durham; 1983–2001	Succeeded by Kevan Jones
Party political offices
Preceded by Anthony Lester	Treasurer of the Fabian Society; 1974–1976	Succeeded by John Roper
Preceded by Colin Crouch	Chair of the Fabian Society; 1976–1977	Succeeded by Dick Leonard
