= 1960 Ludlow by-election =

UK parliamentary by-election

The 1960 Ludlow by-election was a parliamentary by-election for the British House of Commons constituency of Ludlow on 16 November 1960.

== Vacancy ==
The by-election was caused by the death of the sitting Conservative MP, Christopher Holland-Martin on 5 April 1960. He had been MP here since holding the seat in 1951.

== Election history ==
Ludlow had been won by the Conservatives at every election since 1950 when they gained the seat from the Liberals. The result at the last General election was as follows;

1959 general election Electorate 46,735
Party	Candidate	Votes	%	±%
Conservative	Christopher Holland-Martin	21,464	60.3	−1.4
Labour	John Garwell	14,138	39.7	+1.4
Majority		7,326	20.6	−2.7
Turnout		35,602	76.2	+4.5
Conservative hold		Swing		

== Candidates ==
- The Conservatives selected 53-year-old Jasper More. He was a landowner and farmer and since 1955 had chaired the Shropshire branch of the Country Landowners' Association. He became a Shropshire County Councillor in 1958. He was educated at Eton College and King's College, Cambridge, becoming a barrister, called by Lincoln's Inn and Middle Temple in 1930. His career at the bar ended with the outbreak of World War II. He was a civilian employee of the Ministry of Economic Warfare and the Ministry of Aircraft Production and Light Metals Control until 1942, was commissioned as an Army legal officer on the General List in 1943, and was in Italy until 1945 and with the military government of the Dodecanese until 1946. In 1944, he married Clare Hope-Edwards, also a Shropshire landowner.
- Labour re-selected 32-year-old John Garwell, a schoolmaster. He contested Ludlow in 1959. He was educated at Nottingham High School, Nottingham University and Birmingham University. He was a Member of Warwick Rural District Council, the Midlands New Towns Association, and the Fabian Society.
- The Liberals intervened and selected 52-year-old Lt-Col. Denis Rees. He had contested neighbouring Oswestry in 1959. He was an industrial relations adviser. He was educated at Caterham School and McGill University, Canada. He was Mayor of Pembroke from 1937-38. He was Chairman of South Wales Liberal Federation.

== Campaign ==
Even though the previous MP died on 5 April 1960, Polling Day was not fixed until 16 November 1960.

== Result ==
The Conservative Party held the seat.

Ludlow by-election, 1960 Electorate
Party	Candidate	Votes	%	±%
Conservative	Jasper More	13,777	46.4	−13.9
Liberal	Denis G Rees	8,127	27.3	New
Labour	John Garwell	7,812	26.3	−13.4
Majority		5,650	19.1	−1.5
Turnout		29,716	63.7	−12.5
Conservative hold		Swing		

== Aftermath ==
Only More went on to contest the seat at the following elections. Rees contested Cardiff North and Garwell contested Birmingham Selly Oak. The result at the 1964 general election;

General election 1964 Electorate 47,482
Party	Candidate	Votes	%	±%
Conservative	Jasper More	17,290	47.0	−13.3
Labour	Michael K Prendergast	10,763	29.2	−10.5
Liberal	John C Griffiths	8,768	23.8	N/A
Majority		6,527	17.8	−2.8
Turnout		36,821	77.5	+1.3
Conservative hold		Swing		

== See also ==
- List of United Kingdom by-elections
- United Kingdom by-election records
