= HMS Ark Royal (91) =

1938 British aircraft carrier

Coordinates: 36°3′N 4°45′W

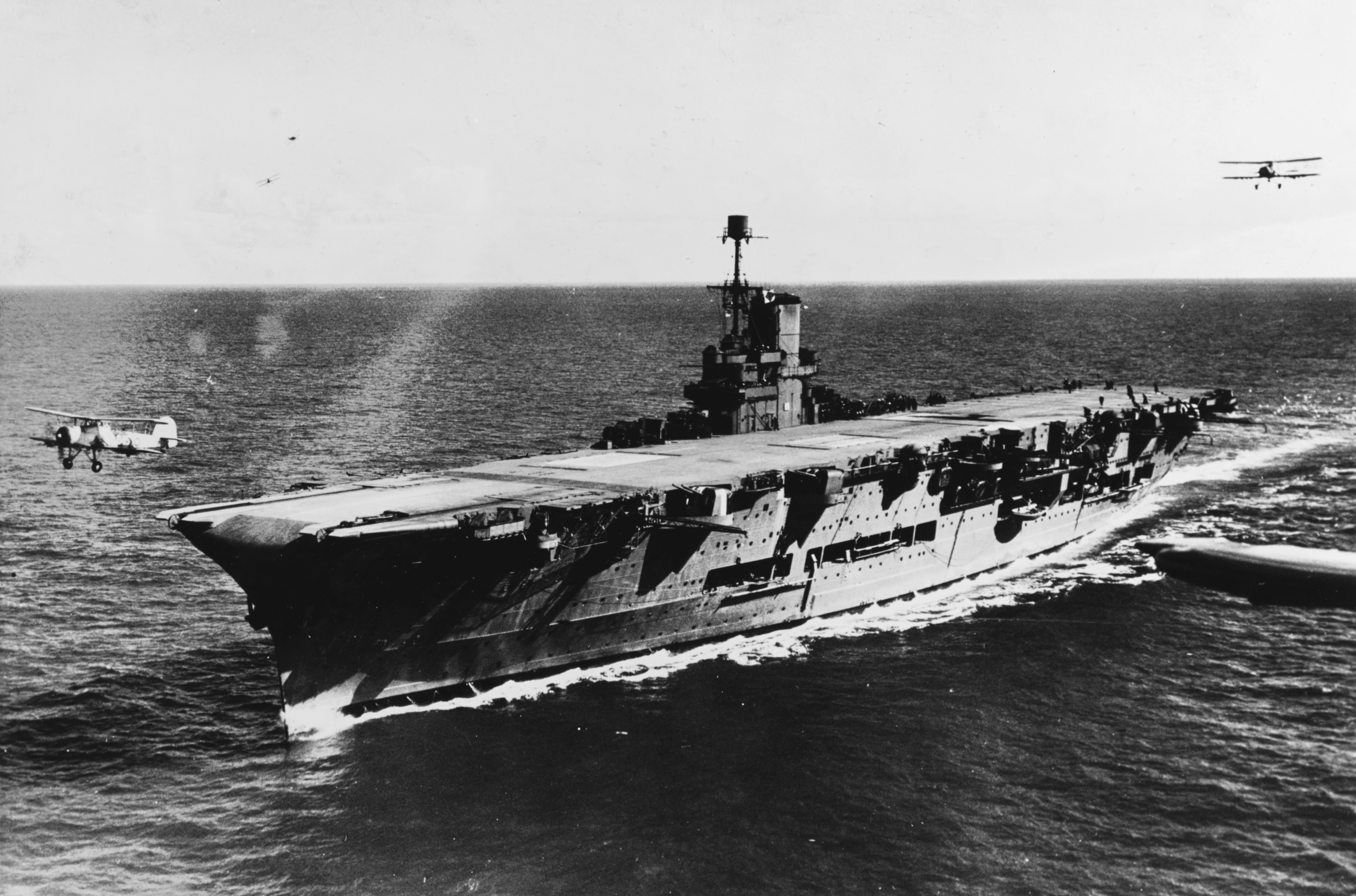
- HMS Ark Royal in 1939, conducting flying operations with Swordfish biplanes

Class overview
- Preceded by: Courageous class
- Succeeded by: Illustrious class

History

United Kingdom
- Name: Ark Royal
- Namesake: Ark Royal (1587)
- Ordered: 1934 build programme
- Builder: Cammell Laird
- Laid down: 16 September 1935
- Launched: 13 April 1937
- Commissioned: 16 December 1938
- Identification: Pennant number: 91
- Motto: Desire n'a pas Repos – "Zeal Does Not Rest"
- Honours and awards: Norway 1940; Spartivento 1940; Mediterranean 1940–41; Malta Convoys 1941; Bismarck 1941
- Fate: Sunk by U-81 near Gibraltar, 14 November 1941

General characteristics
- Type: Aircraft carrier
- Displacement: 22,000 long tons (22,353 t) (standard); 27,720 long tons (28,165 t) (deep load)
- Length: 800 ft (240 m) overall; 721 ft 6 in (219.91 m) waterline
- Beam: 94 ft 9.6 in (28.895 m)
- Draught: 27 ft 9.6 in (8.473 m)
- Installed power: 6 × Admiralty 3-drum boilers; 102,000 shp (76,000 kW)
- Propulsion: 3 × shafts; 3 × geared steam turbines
- Speed: 30 knots (56 km/h; 35 mph) as designed; 31 knots (57 km/h; 36 mph) actual
- Range: 7,600 nmi (14,100 km; 8,700 mi) at 20 knots (37 km/h; 23 mph)
- Complement: 1,580 officers and ratings
- Armament: 8 × twin 4.5 in (110 mm) DP guns; 4 × quadruple 2-pdr (40 mm (1.57 in)) AA guns (Note: Ark Royal entered service with four 8-barrelled mountings, but by October 1941 all six mountings were in place); 8 × quadruple .50 in (12.7 mm) AA machine guns
- Armour: Belt: 4.5 in (11.4 cm); Deck: 3.5 in (8.9 cm) over boiler rooms and magazines
- Aircraft carried: 72 (designed); 50–60 (actual); 1939–1940: 26 × Fairey Swordfish, 24 × Blackburn Skuas; 1940–1941: 30 × Fairey Swordfish, 12 × Blackburn Skuas, 12 × Fairey Fulmars; 1941: 36 × Fairey Swordfish, 18 × Fairey Fulmars
- Aviation facilities: 2 × catapults

HMS Ark Royal (pennant number 91) was an aircraft carrier of the Royal Navy that operated during the Second World War.

Designed in 1934 to fit the restrictions of the Washington Naval Treaty, Ark Royal was built by Cammell Laird at Birkenhead, England, and completed in November 1938. Her design differed from previous aircraft carriers. Ark Royal was the first ship on which the hangars and flight deck were an integral part of the hull, instead of an add-on or part of the superstructure. Designed to carry a large number of aircraft, she had two hangar deck levels. She was used during a period that first saw the extensive use of naval air power; several carrier tactics were developed and refined aboard Ark Royal.

Ark Royal operated in some of the most active naval theatres of the Second World War. She was involved in the first aerial U-boat kills of the war, operations off Norway, the search for the German battleship Bismarck, and the Malta Convoys. Ark Royal survived several near misses and gained a reputation as a "lucky ship". She was torpedoed on 13 November 1941 by the German submarine U-81 and sank the following day. One of her 1,488 crew members was killed. Her sinking was the subject of several inquiries, with investigators keen to know how the carrier was lost in spite of efforts to save the ship and tow her to the naval base at Gibraltar. They found that several design flaws contributed to the loss, which were rectified in subsequent British carriers.

Her wreck was discovered in December 2002 by an American underwater survey company using sonar mounted on an autonomous underwater vehicle, under contract from the BBC for the filming of a documentary about the ship, at a depth around 3,300 feet (1,000 m) and about 30 nautical miles (56 km; 35 mi) from Gibraltar.

== Design ==
In 1923, the Admiralty prepared a 10-year building programme that included an aircraft carrier and 300 aircraft for the Fleet Air Arm. The economic downturn following the First World War caused it to be postponed. In 1930, the Director of Naval Construction, Sir Arthur Johns, began to update the plans for the carrier by incorporating recently developed technology. His aim was to increase the number of aircraft carried by shortening the landing and take-off distances of aircraft using arrestor gear and compressed-steam catapults, respectively, which would make more deck space available for storage and aircraft preparation. Along with the inclusion of two hangar decks, this allowed Ark Royal to carry up to 72 aircraft, although the development of larger and heavier aircraft during the carrier's construction meant that the actual number carried was between 50 and 60. Ark Royal featured an enclosed hangar design (Note: Norman Friedman: When the flight deck becomes the strength deck, the aircraft hangars are then enclosed within the hull structure. The terms, "enclosed" and "open" hangars, strictly speaking, do not refer to a hangar that is closed or open on the sides, but rather to whether the hangar is, respectively, below or above the strength deck) where the flight deck was the "strength deck" (Note: Friedman: The flight deck was designed with 0.75 in of Ducol steel. The enclosed hangar design required a deck around this thickness to ensure adequate hull integrity, so the limited armour protection was a by-product of the enclosed hangar design. The strength deck is designed to carry structural loading in combination with the hull girder and side and bottom plating. Ship's structure above the strength deck is termed superstructure. Ducol steel was an advanced type of high-tensile steel, which had great strength and was often used to provide armour for splinter protection.) and was strongly built with 0.75-inch-thick (19 mm) Ducol steel plating. The two hangar decks were thus enclosed within the hull girder, which also gave splinter protection to the hangars. The machinery spaces were protected by 4.5-inch (11.4 cm) belt armour. Three lifts (elevators) moved aircraft between the hangars and the flight deck.

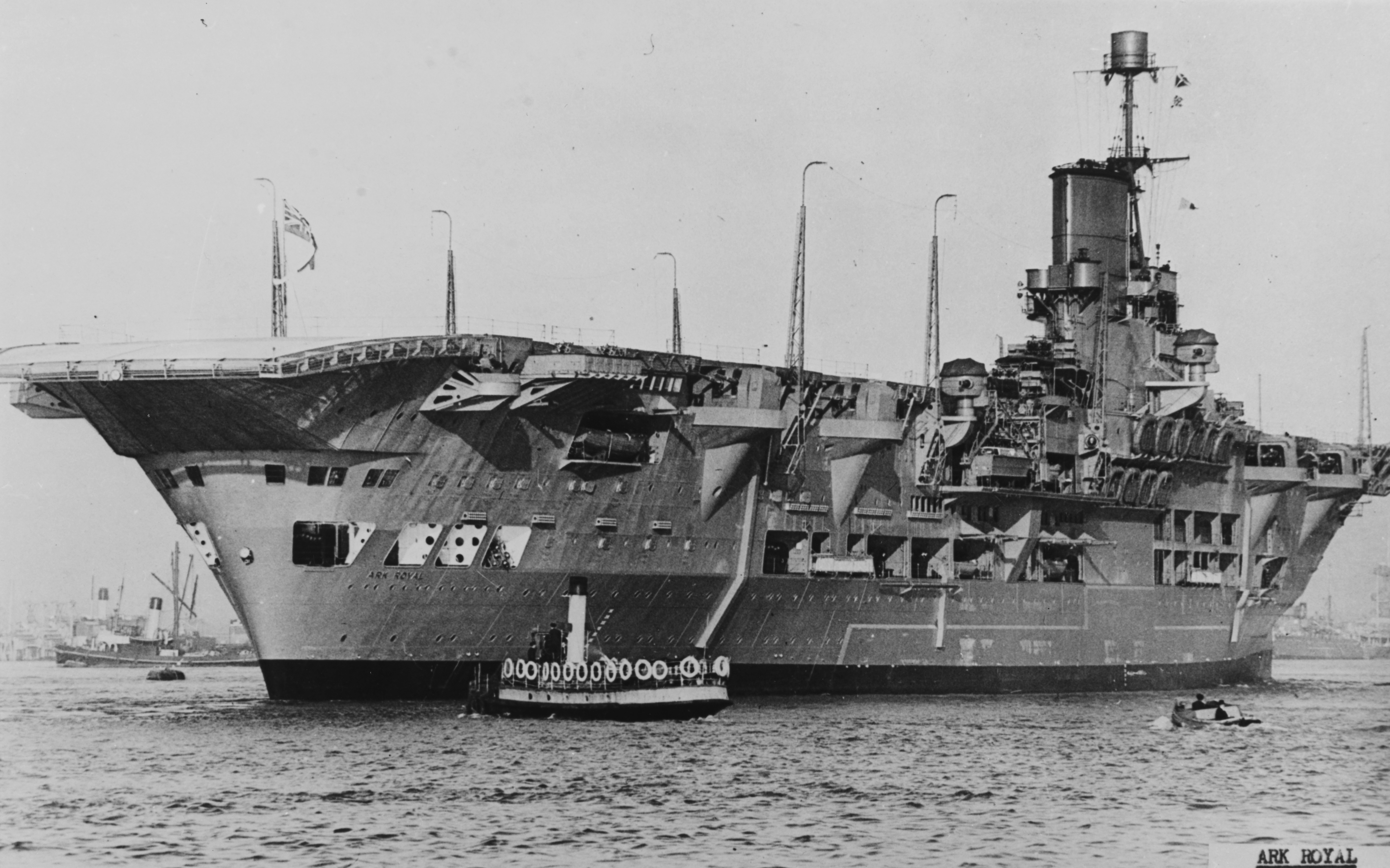
Ark Royal's flight deck overhung the stern. Her unusual height above the waterline is visible in comparison with the tugboat.

Another feature was the length and height of the flight deck. At 800 feet (240 m), the flight deck was 118 feet (36 m) longer than the keel; the latter was dictated by the length of Royal Navy (RN) drydocks in Gibraltar and Malta. Due to the twin hangar decks, the flight deck rose to 66 feet (20 m) above the waterline.

The Washington and London Naval Treaties had restricted warship displacement for a number of nations after the end of the Great War, and both were to expire by the end of 1936. (Note: The Washington Naval Treaty (signed in February 1922) imposed a limit of 135,000 tons on total British aircraft carrier displacement, with no one ship allowed to exceed 33,000 tons, and only two to exceed 27,000 tons. The London Naval Treaty (signed in April 1930) prevented signatories from constructing new capital ships, or converting existing capital ships into aircraft carriers, until 1937.) With a potential naval arms race developing between Britain, Japan, and Italy, the British government sought a second treaty, which included limiting the maximum displacement of an aircraft carrier to 23,000 long tons (23,000 t). Ark Royal would have to fit this anticipated limit; to conserve weight, armour plating was limited to the belt, engine rooms, and magazines, while welding instead of rivetting 65% of the hull saved 500 long tons (510 t). Installation of an armoured flight deck was not possible, as the weight would have placed Ark Royal above the proposed limit, while reducing her endurance and stability. The ship was designed with a three-layer side protection system based upon a void-liquid-void scheme very similar to that used on the King George V-class battleships, and was designed to protect against torpedoes with up to a 750-pound (340 kg) warhead.

The ship was fitted with six boilers, which powered three Parsons geared turbines. The turbines were connected by three driveshafts to three propellers 16 feet (4.9 m) in diameter, to produce a maximum theoretical speed of 30 knots (56 km/h; 35 mph). Speed was important, as with catapults and arrestor gear, Ark Royal would have to turn into the wind to launch and recover aircraft. To avoid endangering other ships with the frequent course changes associated with flight operations, Ark Royal would have to break away from accompanying ships and catch up on completion. Additionally, as the carrier was not armed for ship-to-ship combat, speed was her main protection against enemy warships.

== Construction ==
The deteriorating international situation by 1933, typified by Germany's rearmament and the expansion of Japan and Italy, convinced the British to announce funds for the carrier's construction in the 1934 budget proposals. The plans were finished by November 1934 and were tendered in February 1935 to Cammell Laird and Company, Ltd, which calculated the cost of the hull at £1,496,250 (equivalent to £119 million in 2024) and the main machinery at about £500,000 (equivalent to £40 million in 2024). The overall cost was estimated to be over £3 million (equivalent to £240 million in 2024), making Ark Royal the most expensive ship other than battleships ordered by the RN. Construction began on Job No. 1012 when Ark Royal's keel was laid down on 16 September 1935.

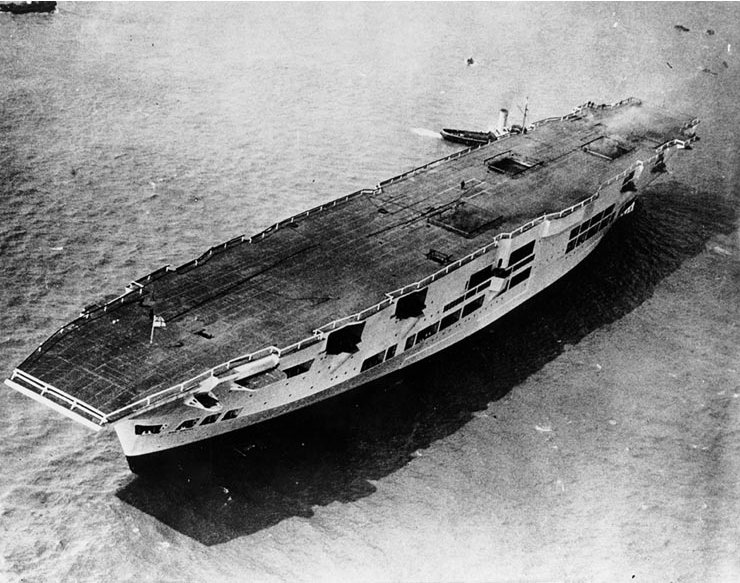
Ark Royal immediately after launching. The lifts on the flight deck and the anti-aircraft positions on the hull are visible.

Ark Royal spent nearly two years in the builder's yard before being launched on 13 April 1937 by Lady Maud Hoare, wife of Sir Samuel Hoare, then First Lord of the Admiralty. The bottle of champagne thrown against Ark Royal's bows did not smash until the fourth attempt. The carrier spent a year fitting out, was handed over to her first commander, Captain Arthur Power, on 16 November 1938, and was commissioned on 16 December. Although intended for the Far East, events in Europe during the carrier's construction, including the Italian invasion of Abyssinia in 1935 and the Spanish Civil War in 1936, caused the Admiralty to mark her for deployment with the Home and Mediterranean Fleets. After her crew joined at the end of 1938, Ark Royal underwent sea trials to prepare for service, during which the carrier proved capable of sailing above her theoretical speed, reaching over 31 knots (57.4 km/h; 35.6 mph), and in trials during May 1938, Ark Royal achieved 31.2 knots (57.8 km/h; 35.9 mph) with 103,012 shaft horsepower (76,816 kW) at a deep displacement of 27,525 long tons (27,967 t).

== Armament and aircraft ==
Ark Royal's armament was designed with antiaircraft warfare in mind, as aircraft were expected to be the main threat; ships and submarines could be outrun or dealt with by escorts. Her main armament was 16 quick-firing 4.5-inch (113 mm) dual-purpose guns in eight twin turrets, four on each side of the hull, controlled by four directors using the High Angle Control System. The original design placed the turrets low on the hull, but was later altered to locate them just below the flight deck, which increased each turret's field of fire. Six eight-barrelled 40-millimetre (1.57 in) QF 2-pounder "pom-pom" gun mounts were located on the flight deck, in front of and behind the superstructure island, while eight four-barrelled .50-inch (12.7 mm) Vickers machine guns were installed on small projecting platforms to the front and rear of the flight deck.

Sixteen Fleet Air Arm squadrons were posted aboard Ark Royal during her career, with an average of five squadrons at any time. On entering service, most of Ark Royal's squadrons were equipped with either Blackburn Skuas—used as fighters and dive bombers—or Fairey Swordfish for reconnaissance and torpedo bombing. From April 1940, squadrons equipped with Skuas were upgraded to Fairey Fulmars; like their predecessors, these were used as fighters and bombers. On occasion, the carrier operated Blackburn Roc fighter-bombers (from April 1939 – October 1940) and Fairey Albacore torpedo bombers (during October 1941); these were replacement aircraft used to boost squadron numbers. In June 1940, Ark Royal was host to 701 Naval Air Squadron, a training squadron that operated Supermarine Walrus reconnaissance amphibious aircraft.

Squadrons embarked aboard Ark Royal
Squadron	Aircraft operated	Embarked (from – to)	Notes
800	Blackburn Skua Mk. II	January 1939 – April 1941	Transferred to Victorious
810	Fairey Swordfish Mk. I	January 1939 – September 1941	
820	Fairey Swordfish Mk. I	January 1939 – June 1941	–
821	Fairey Swordfish Mk. I	January 1939 – April 1940	Removed from operational service following losses against Scharnhorst
803	Blackburn Skua Mk. II; Blackburn Roc Mk. I	April 1939 – October 1940	–
818	Fairey Swordfish Mk. I	August–October 1939; June–July 1940	Operated from Furious and land bases between October 1939 and June 1940
801	Blackburn Skua Mk. II	April–May 1940	Transferred to Furious
807	Fairey Fulmar Mk. II	April–November 1941	Embarked at sinking
701	Supermarine Walrus Mk. I	June 1940	Training squadron
808	Fairey Fulmar Mk. II	September 1940 – November 1941	Embarked at sinking
821X	Fairey Swordfish Mk. I	December 1940 – January 1941	Flight assembled from 821 Squadron survivors, later absorbed into 815 Squadron
800Y	Fairey Fulmar Mk. I	June 1941	Flight from 800 Squadron
825	Fairey Swordfish Mk. I	June–November 1941	Embarked at sinking
816	Fairey Swordfish Mk. I	July–November 1941	Embarked at sinking
812	Fairey Swordfish Mk. I	September–November 1941	Embarked at sinking
828	Fairey Swordfish Mk. I Fairey Albacore Mk. I	October 1941	Redeployed to Malta

== Service history ==
=== With the hunter-killer groups ===
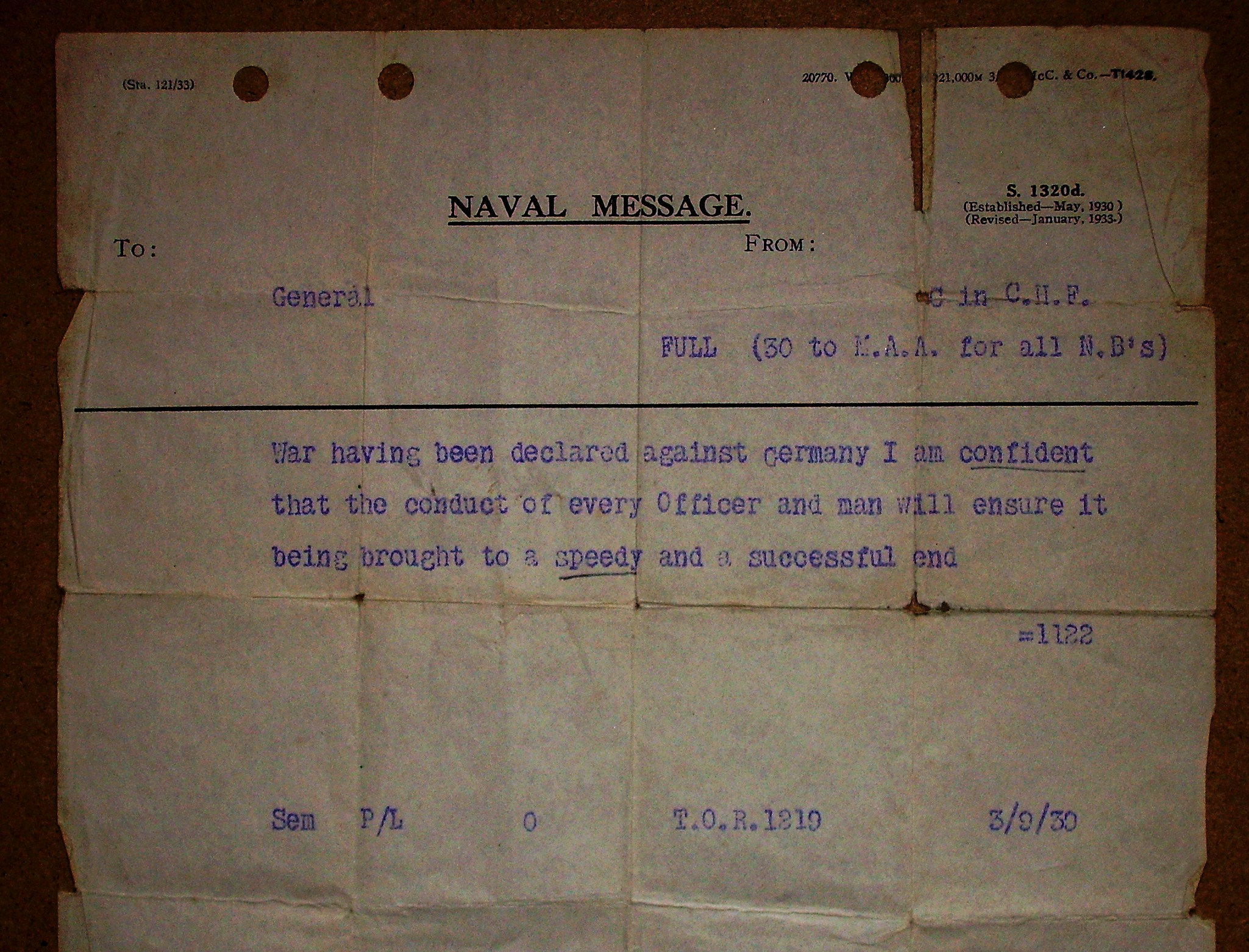
The message sent to the ship informing her of the commencing of hostilities on 3 September 1939

The outbreak of the Second World War on 1 September 1939 had been presaged by Germany's U-boat fleet taking up positions off the British coast, where they could intercept British shipping. Within hours of Britain and France declaring war on Germany, the passenger ship SS Athenia was torpedoed by U-30, the first of over 65,000 tons of shipping sunk by U-boats during the first week of the war. Ark Royal was deployed with the Home Fleet in the North Western Approaches as part of a "hunter-killer" group, consisting of a flotilla of destroyers and other antisubmarine vessels grouped around an aircraft carrier, either Courageous, Hermes or Ark Royal. Carrier-borne aircraft could increase the area searched for U-boats, but made the carriers tempting targets.

On 14 September, Ark Royal received a distress call from SS Fanad Head, which was 200 nautical miles (230 mi; 370 km) away under pursuit from the surfaced U-30. Ark Royal launched aircraft to aid the merchant ship, but was spotted by U-39, which launched two torpedoes. Lookouts spotted the torpedo tracks and Ark Royal turned towards the attack, reducing her cross-section and causing the torpedoes to miss and explode harmlessly astern. Three F-class destroyers escorting the carrier began a depth-charge attack of U-39 and forced her to the surface. The German crew abandoned ship before U-39 sank—the first U-boat lost during the war. Ark Royal's aircraft reached Fanad Head, which was in the hands of a German boarding party. The Skuas unsuccessfully attacked U-30; two crashed when caught by the blast of their own bombs. The U-boat escaped after rescuing the boarding party and the pilots of the downed aircraft (both observers had drowned), and torpedoing the Fanad Head.

Ark Royal returned to base in Loch Ewe, where her crew and she were inspected by Winston Churchill. The sinking of U-39 was hailed as important to morale. However, the failed attack on Ark Royal, and the successful attack on Courageous on 17 September, convinced the Admiralty that risking aircraft carriers in this way was too dangerous and carrier-centred hunter-killer groups were abandoned.

=== Another near miss ===
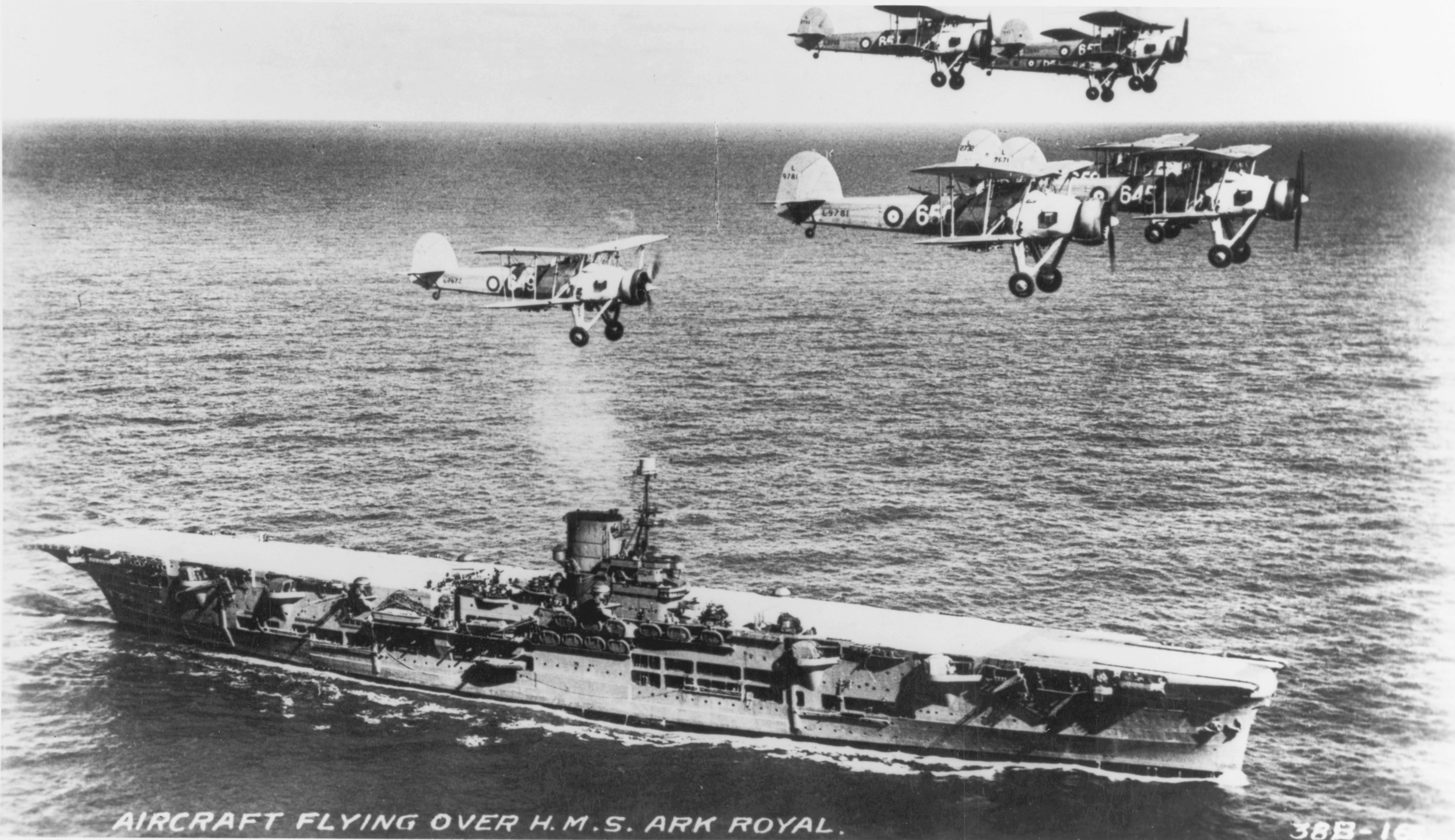
HMS Ark Royal in 1939, with Swordfish of 820 Naval Air Squadron passing overhead

On 25 September 1939, Ark Royal helped rescue the submarine Spearfish, which had been damaged by German warships off Horn Reefs, in the Kattegat. While returning to port with Spearfish and the battleships Nelson and Rodney on 26 September, the ships were located by three Luftwaffe Dornier Do 18 seaplanes. Ark Royal launched three Blackburn Skuas to disperse them; one Dornier was shot down in an event propagandised as first British aerial kill of the war (later it was learned that the pilot of a Fairey Battle achieved the first kill).

The air commander aboard Ark Royal—aware that the surviving Dorniers would report the location of the British ships—ordered the aircraft to be secured and the antiaircraft weapons readied. Four Junkers Ju 88 bombers of the Luftwaffe bomber wing KG 30 soon appeared; three were driven away by antiaircraft fire, but the fourth launched a 2,200-pound (1,000 kg) bomb at the carrier. Ark Royal turned hard to starboard, heeling over and avoiding the bomb, which landed in the ocean 100 feet (30 m) off her starboard bow and sent a spout of water over the ship. The German pilots did not see if the carrier had been hit, and a reconnaissance flight later located the two battleships, but not Ark Royal. Based on this information, the Germans incorrectly claimed that Ark Royal had sunk. To prove the German propaganda false before it had a negative effect on Britain's allies, Winston Churchill reassured U.S. President Franklin Delano Roosevelt that the carrier was undamaged and invited the U.S. naval attaché to view Ark Royal in dock. The British naval attaché in Rome was instructed to assure Italian Prime Minister Benito Mussolini that the ship was still in service. This was an embarrassment for Goebbels and Nazi propaganda.

=== Hunting the Graf Spee ===
In October 1939, Ark Royal was redeployed to Freetown to operate off the African coast in the hunt for the German commerce raider Admiral Graf Spee. The carrier was assigned to Force K and sailed with the battlecruiser Renown to the South Atlantic. On 9 October, aircraft from Ark Royal spotted the German tanker Altmark, which supplied Graf Spee. The tanker was disguised as the U.S. vessel Delmar, which fooled the British into passing her by. On 5 November, Ark Royal captured the German merchant SS Uhenfels, which was attempting to reach Germany. The ship was later taken into British service as a cargo ship and renamed Empire Ability. Several neutral merchant ships were also spotted by the carrier's aircraft, twice causing crews to believe they were under attack and abandon ship. A note explaining the situation was dropped in a bag to a Norwegian vessel's crew, and they reboarded; an attempt to repeat this exercise with a Belgian crew failed when the bag was dropped down the ship's funnel.

On 14 December 1939, Graf Spee had put into Montevideo to repair damage received during the Battle of the River Plate. Two RN cruisers followed the raider, and patrolled the harbour entrance while reporting Graf Spee's position to the fleet. Ark Royal and Renown were dispatched to join the British ships outside the harbour, but as they were 36 hours away, the British naval attaché came up with a plan to make the Germans believe that the two capital ships had already arrived. An order for fuel for Ark Royal was placed at Buenos Aires, 140 miles (230 km) west of Montevideo. This was leaked to the press, passed on to the German embassy in Montevideo, and given to Graf Spee's captain, Hans Langsdorff. This contributed to Langsdorff's decision to scuttle his ship.

=== Return to the fleet ===
With Graf Spee sunk, Ark Royal remained in the Atlantic for a short time before escorting the damaged heavy cruiser Exeter back to Devonport Dockyard, where they arrived in February. Following this, Ark Royal proceeded to Portsmouth to take on supplies and personnel, before sailing to Scapa Flow. On arrival, she transferred her Blackburn Skuas to Naval Air Station Hatston to strengthen the anchorage's defences. Ark Royal was then assigned to the Mediterranean Fleet for exercises, departing Scapa Flow on 22 March 1940 and heading for Alexandria with the aircraft carrier Glorious. The carriers arrived in the Eastern Mediterranean on 8 April, but the exercises were cancelled a day later. The ships sailed to Gibraltar to await orders.

German forces had invaded Norway as part of Operation Weserübung on 9 April and had secured sections of the coast. Attempts by the RN to operate in support of British troops failed; air attacks had overwhelmed the ships, sinking Gurkha and nearly sinking Suffolk. Realising that the British ships required air cover, but aware that the Norwegian coast was outside the range of British land-based aircraft, the Admiralty recalled Ark Royal and Glorious from the Mediterranean on 16 April.

=== Norwegian campaign ===
Ark Royal and Glorious arrived at Scapa Flow on 23 April 1940 and were immediately redeployed as part of Operation DX, sailing to Norway with the cruisers Curlew and Berwick and screened by the destroyers Hyperion, Hereward, Hasty, Fearless, Fury and Juno. This was the first time the RN had deployed carriers with the primary purpose of providing fighter protection for other warships. The ships took up position on 25 April off the coast; Ark Royal was positioned 120 nautical miles (220 km; 140 mi) offshore to reduce the chance of air attacks. The carrier's aircraft conducted antisubmarine patrols, provided fighter support for other ships, and carried out strikes against shipping and shore targets. Ark Royal returned to Scapa Flow on 27 April to refuel and replace lost and damaged aircraft, before heading back on the same day with the battleship Valiant as escort. During the return, Ark Royal came under air attack from German Junkers Ju 88 and Heinkel He 111 bombers operating from Norway. The carrier was undamaged and resumed position on 29 April.

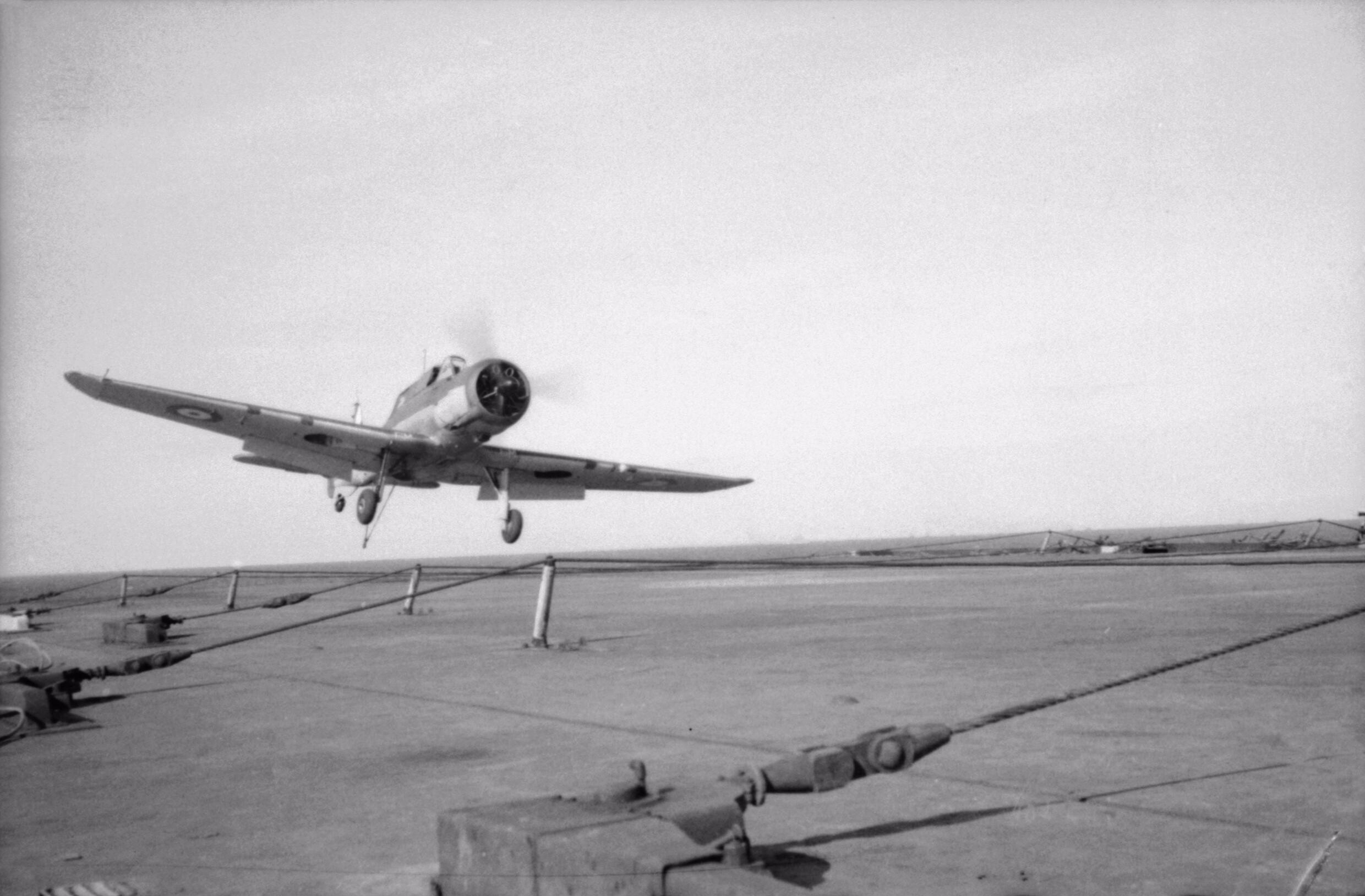
A Blackburn Skua landing on Ark Royal: The Skuas were the mainstay of the Fleet Air Arm during the early Second World War. Also visible are the arrestor wires strung across the flight deck.

By this point, the British high command had realised that they could not hold the Germans in southern Norway. The evacuation of Allied troops from Molde and Åndalsnes began, with Ark Royal providing air cover from 30 April. On 1 May, the Germans tried to sink the carrier, with numerous air attacks through the day. Ark Royal's fighters and a heavy antiaircraft barrage drove off the enemy, and although several bombs were dropped at the carrier, none hit. The evacuations of Molde and Andalsnes were completed on 3 May, and the carrier was recalled to Scapa Flow to refuel and rearm. While in port, Captain Arthur Power left the ship for a promotion to the Admiralty, and was replaced by Captain Cedric Holland. On return to Norway, Ark Royal was told to provide air cover for operations around Narvik, including the landing of French troops on 13 May. She was joined on 18 May by the carriers Glorious and Furious.

Despite these efforts, by the end of May, French forces clearly were on the verge of collapse and Norway was a sideshow compared to the German advance to the English Channel. Operation Alphabet was instigated to move Allied troops from Narvik to Britain. Ark Royal and Glorious—screened by the destroyers Highlander, Diana, Acasta, Ardent, and Acheron—sailed from Scapa Flow on 1 June to cover the evacuation, which commenced the next day. Ark Royal carried out air patrols and bombing raids from 3–6 June, before redeploying to Narvik on 7 June. The next day, Glorious, Acasta, and Ardent were sunk by the German battleships Scharnhorst and Gneisenau while heading back to Britain. Ark Royal's aircraft failed to locate the German ships, which had returned to Trondheim.

The last evacuation convoy left Narvik on 9 June. Before the British ships could withdraw, a raid on Trondheim located Scharnhorst. An attack by Ark Royal's Skuas took place at midnight on 13 June. The attack was a disaster; the escort destroyers Antelope and Electra collided while Ark Royal was launching aircraft in fog and returned to England for repairs, eight of the 15 attacking Skuas were shot down, while Scharnhorst escaped damage. Ark Royal returned to Scapa Flow the following day and was reassigned to the Mediterranean Fleet.

=== Mediterranean deployment ===
Ark Royal left Scapa Flow with the battlecruiser Hood and three destroyers, arriving at Gibraltar on 23 June 1940. Here, she joined Force H, under Sir James Somerville. After the capitulation of France concern arose that a French fleet at Mers-el-Kébir might fall under Axis control and tip the balance of power in the Mediterranean. Ark Royal's captain, Cedric Holland, who had been the British naval attaché in Paris, was sent to negotiate the surrender or scuttling of the French fleet. Force H was deployed outside the harbour, and when the French admirals refused to agree to the offered terms, opened fire on the French ships. During the attack on Mers-el-Kébir, Ark Royal's aircraft provided targeting information for the British ships. The French battleship Strasbourg escaped, despite attacks by Swordfish from Ark Royal. Two days after the attack, aircraft from Ark Royal incapacitated the French battleship Dunkerque, which had been beached in the initial attack.

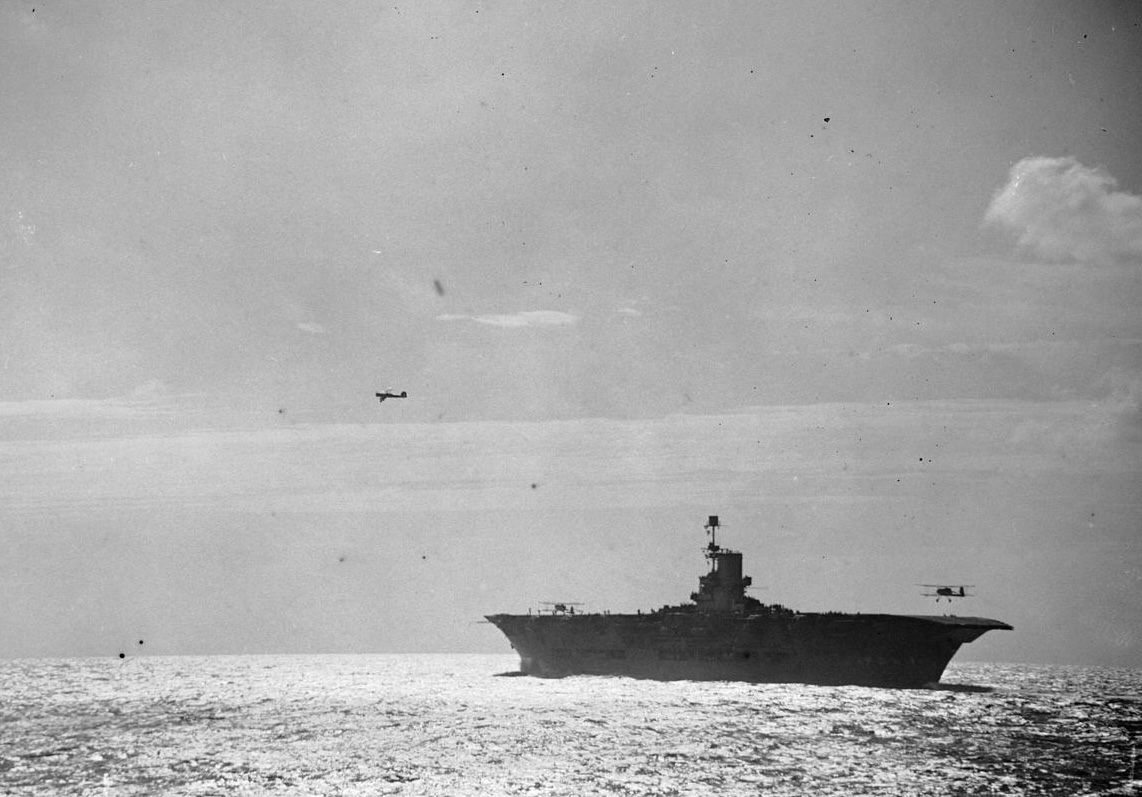
A Fairey Swordfish aircraft lands on Ark Royal's flight deck, whilst a Blackburn Skua circles overhead. Photograph taken from Kelvin after the attacks on the Italian Fleet off Sardinia.

Having reduced the possibility of a French challenge in the Mediterranean, Force H prepared for attacks on Italian targets and sailed from Gibraltar on 8 July. The force was attacked by Italian bombers within eight hours of departing, and although Force H escaped damage, Somerville cancelled the raids and ordered the fleet to Gibraltar. During July, the British colony of Malta came under attack from the Italian air force, with Force H ordered to deliver Hawker Hurricanes to reinforce the island's air defences. Force H was deployed from 31 July – 4 August, with the carrier Argus used to deliver the aircraft, while Ark Royal provided air cover for the fleet. On 2 August, Ark Royal launched a successful air attack against the Italian air base at Cagliari.

Force H remained at Gibraltar until August, when it escorted reinforcements for Admiral Andrew Cunningham's fleet at Alexandria. En route, diversionary attacks were planned on Italian air bases at Elmas and Cagliari to divert attention from both the reinforcement operation and a supply convoy sailing to Malta. The successful attacks were carried out on 1 September. Force H then turned back west once the reinforcements had met with Cunningham's fleet in the central Mediterranean, without attracting significant attention from the Italian air force. After returning to Gibraltar, Ark Royal was detached on 6 September and sent to West Africa to support British attempts to encourage Vichy French colonies to switch allegiance to the Free French, being a part of Force M (Operation Menace). On 14 September Ark Royal joined British cruisers near Dakar in a failed attempt of intercepting French cruisers, and her aircraft carried out a reconnaissance of the harbour on a following day. On 23 September the allied fleet approached Dakar. During negotiations, two Free French aircraft C.272 Luciole flew from Ark Royal, but their aircrews were arrested at Dakar. Negotiations failed, but only on 24 September bombers from Ark Royal were directed against military installations during the unsuccessful British attempt to take Dakar by force. In a morning attack, six Skuas were sent against the battleship Richelieu, but only one near miss was achieved. Further torpedo attacks of Swordfishes against the Richelieu and French cruisers were unsuccessful, and at least eight Ark Royal aircraft were lost that day due to anti-aircaft fire and French fighters. On 25 September the British fleet withdrew to Freetown.Ark Royal then returned to Britain for refit, docking in Liverpool on 8 October after being escorted by Fortune, Forester, and Greyhound. The refit—which lasted until 3 November—included repairs to her machinery and the installation of a new flight-deck barrier.

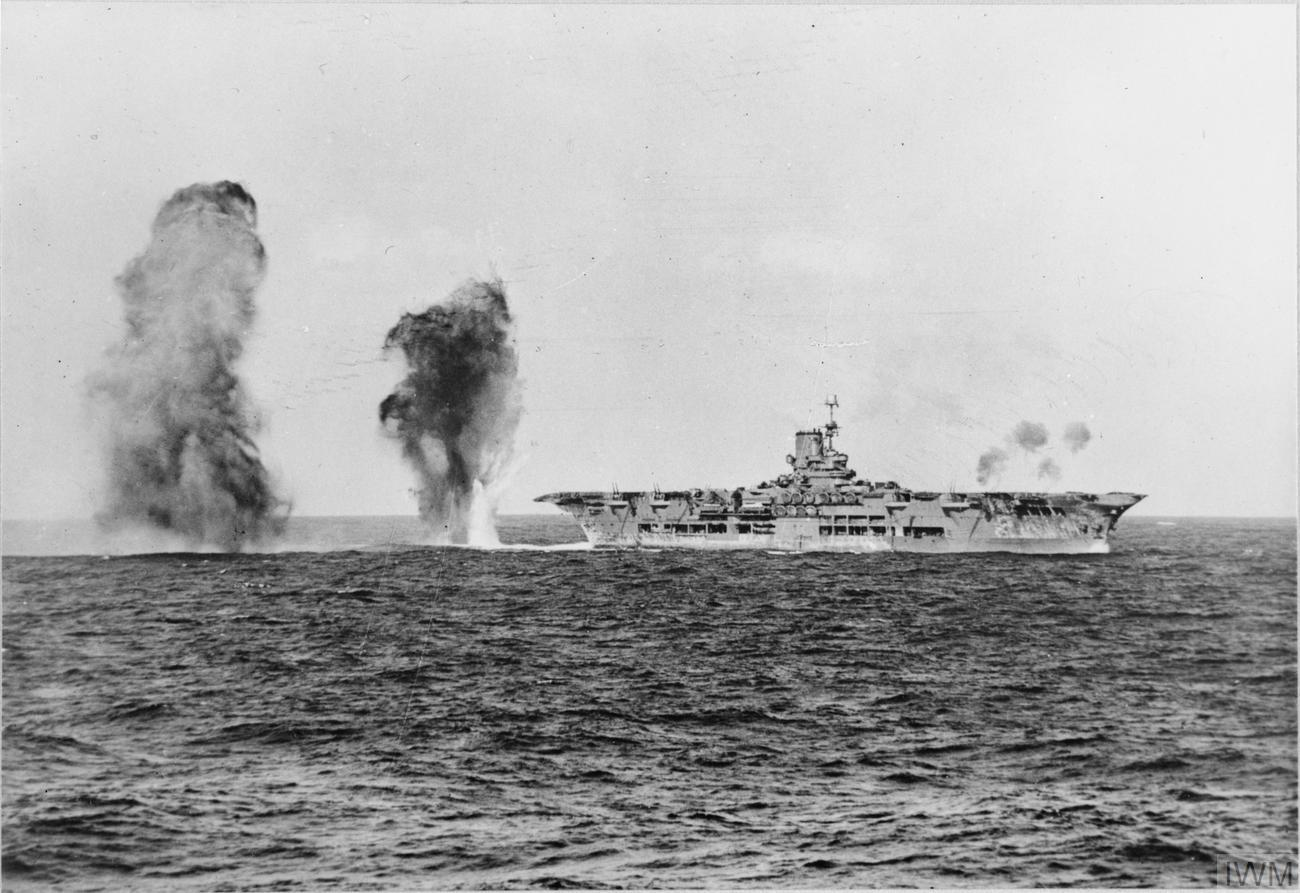
Bombs falling astern of Ark Royal during an attack by Italian aircraft during the Battle of Cape Spartivento, photograph taken from the cruiser Sheffield

Next, Ark Royal—accompanied by Barham, Berwick, and Glasgow—sailed for Gibraltar, arriving on 6 November. They were deployed with the rest of Force H to escort convoys from Gibraltar to Alexandria and Malta, performing several runs before being assigned to Operation Collar, one of 35 convoys to support Malta between 1940 and 1942, on 25 November. An Italian fleet—led by the battleships Giulio Cesare and Vittorio Veneto—was dispatched to intercept the convoy. The Italian fleet was detected by a reconnaissance aircraft from Ark Royal, and the carrier launched Swordfish torpedo bombers while the capital ships of Force H turned to meet the enemy. During the engagement, the Battle of Cape Spartivento, the Italian destroyer Lanciere was damaged, although whether torpedoes from the bombers or British gunfire were responsible is uncertain. The British mistook Lanciere for a cruiser, while the Italian commanders received incorrect reports that the cruiser Bolzano had been hit. British attacks failed to damage any other Italian ships or sink the disabled destroyer, and a retaliatory attack by the Italian air force had Ark Royal as the subject of multiple bombing runs, none of which hit. The battle had no clear result, although the British convoy reached its destination unscathed.

On 14 December 1940, Ark Royal and Force H were redeployed from Gibraltar to the Atlantic to search the Azores for commerce raiders. Ark Royal returned to the Mediterranean on 20 December and escorted the battleship Malaya and merchant ships from Malta until 27 December. Force H then became involved in Operation Excess, a plan to move convoys through the Mediterranean to support the Western Desert Force, which was trying to push Italian land forces from Egypt into Libya. Over the next month, British control of the Mediterranean theatre was weakened, particularly by the entry of the Luftwaffe and the near-loss of the aircraft carrier Illustrious. The Mediterranean Fleet was under pressure from Axis forces in the Eastern Mediterranean, while the British port at Gibraltar was likely to be lost if the Spanish chose to ally with the Germans instead of remaining neutral. To relieve the Mediterranean Fleet, while demonstrating British strength to the Spanish, the Admiralty and Admiral Cunningham planned to use Ark Royal's Swordfish bombers in raids against Italian targets, supported by bombardment from heavy fleet units. The first bombing, on 2 January against the Tirso Dam in Sardinia, was unsuccessful, but Ark Royal's Swordfish bombers were more successful on 6 January, when they bombed the port city of Genoa. The carrier's aircraft also covered the battlecruiser Renown and battleship Malaya while they shelled the port in Operation Grog. On 9 January, Ark Royal launched aircraft to bomb an oil refinery at La Spezia and to lay mines in the harbour. Both operations were successful.

=== Searching for Scharnhorst and Gneisenau ===
In early February 1941, the battleships Scharnhorst and Gneisenau headed into the Atlantic during Operation Berlin on the orders of Grand Admiral Erich Raeder, commander of the German Navy. They were to disrupt Allied shipping and draw capital ships from other areas. On 8 March, Force H and Ark Royal were ordered to the Canary Islands to search for the battleships and to cover convoys crossing from the United States. Ark Royal used her aircraft to search for captured ships returning to Germany under the control of prize crews. Three ships were located on 19 March; two scuttled themselves, while the third—SS Polykarp— reached France.

On the evening of 21 March 1941, a Fairey Fulmar from Ark Royal stumbled across Scharnhorst and Gneisenau at sea. Because of a radio malfunction, the crew had to return to Ark Royal to report, by which time the German ships had escaped under fog. The next day, Ark Royal re-established air patrols in the hope of relocating the raiders. During the day, a catapult malfunction destroyed a Fairey Swordfish, flinging the fuselage into the sea ahead of the carrier. Unable to stop, Ark Royal ran over the Swordfish and was overhead when the aircraft's depth charges detonated. Scharnhorst and Gneisenau reached Brest without British harassment, while Ark Royal returned to Gibraltar for repairs, arriving on 24 March.

=== Malta convoys and Operation Tiger ===
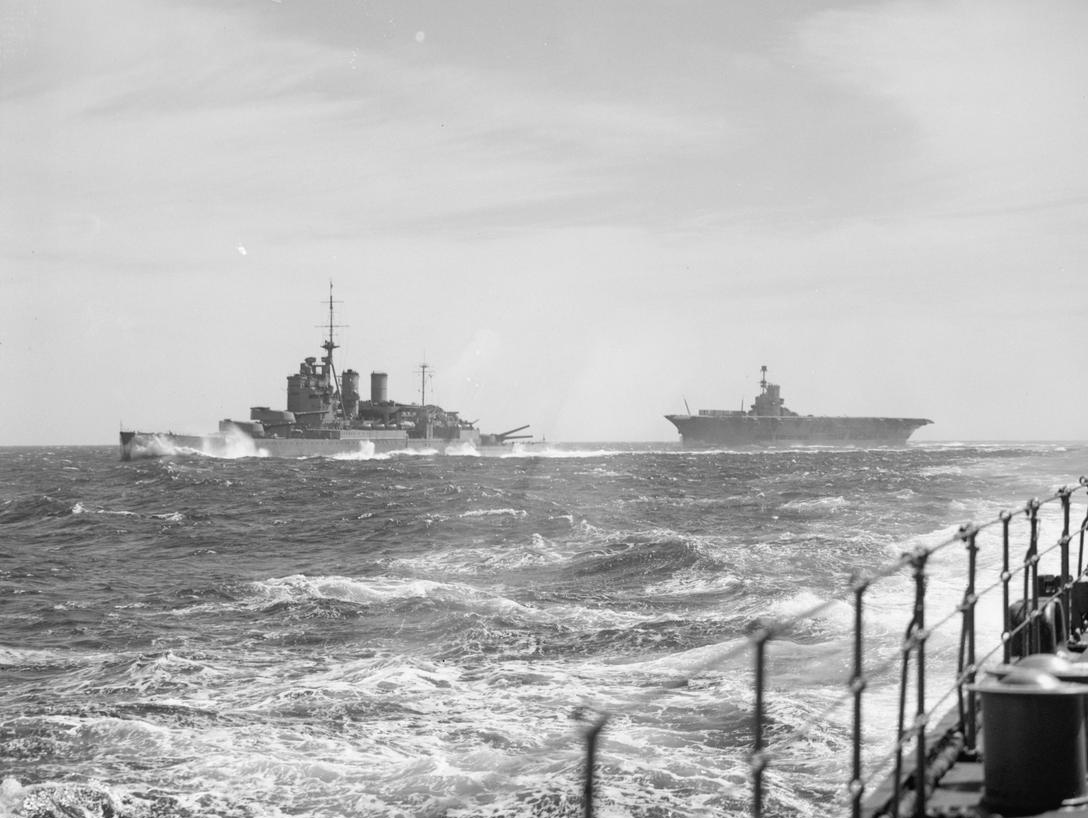
Ark Royal at sea with the battlecruiser Renown

Ark Royal spent April alternating between covering convoys and delivering aircraft to Malta and forays into the Atlantic to hunt commerce raiders. By May 1941, Erwin Rommel's Afrika Korps were driving through North Africa towards the Suez Canal, pushing the Western Desert Force before them. With British forces close to collapse and strategic locations threatened, the British High Command risked sending a reinforcement convoy across the Mediterranean to Alexandria. The convoy consisted of five large transport ships, escorted by Ark Royal, the battlecruiser Renown, the battleship Queen Elizabeth, the cruisers Sheffield, Naiad, Fiji, and Gloucester, and screened by destroyers of the 5th Destroyer Flotilla. Prior to Ark Royal's departure, Captain Holland left to recuperate from stress and poor health and was replaced by Captain Loben Maund. The convoy left Gibraltar on 6 May and was detected by Italian aircraft. The convoy—limited to 14 knots (26 km/h; 16 mph) and escorted by so many capital ships—was such a tempting target that Italian and German aircraft were mobilised.

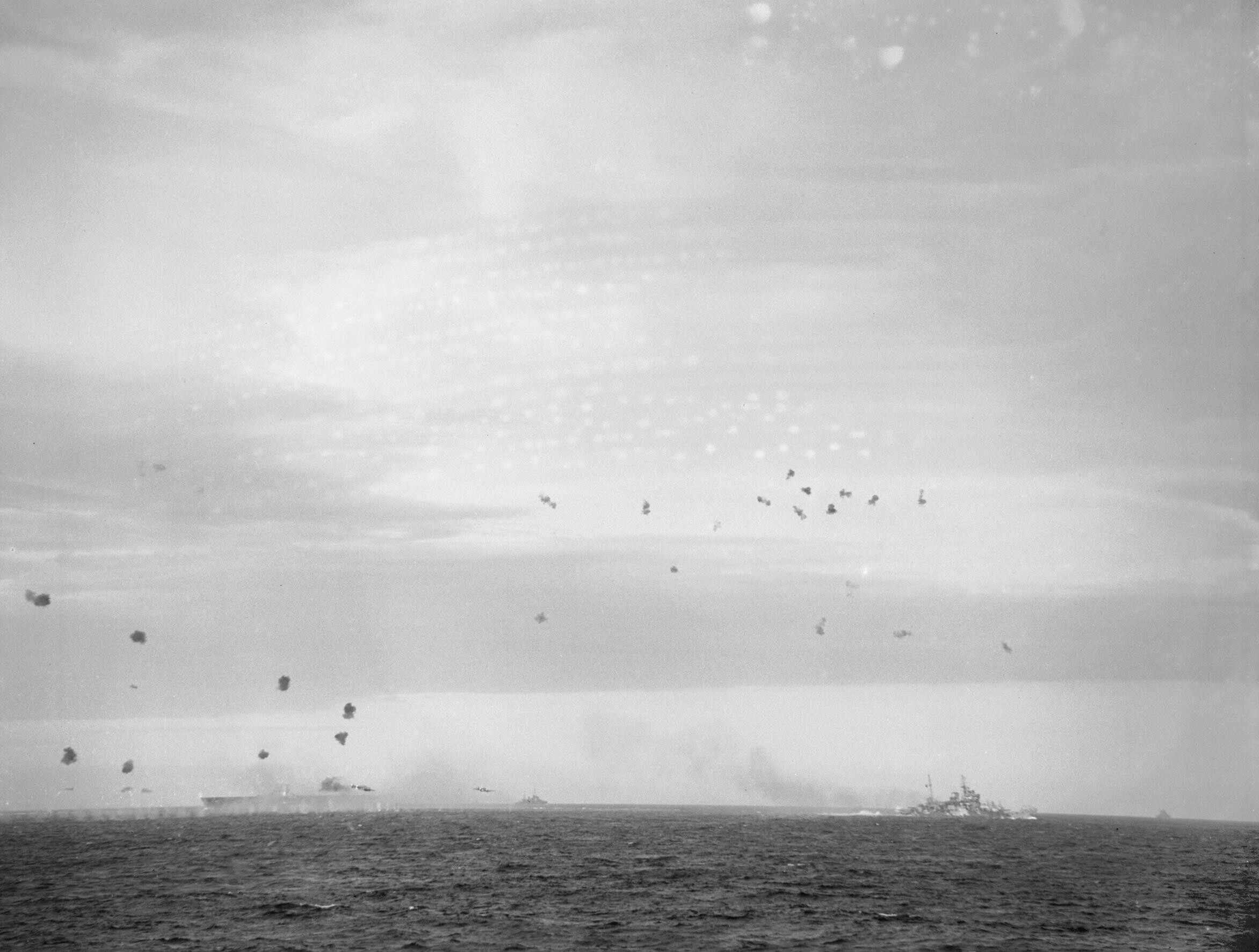
An intense antiaircraft barrage is visible during an attack by Italian torpedo bombers on Force H. Ark Royal is on the left, with an Italian aircraft over her bow, and HMS Renown is to the right.

The British convoy came under air attack on 8 May, first by the Italian air force, then the German Luftwaffe. Over the day, 12 of Ark Royal's Fairey Fulmars (the maximum number available) drove off over 50 aircraft, with the assistance of targeting information from Sheffield's radar and antiaircraft fire from the escorts. During the initial waves, one Fulmar was lost, killing Flight Lieutenant Rupert Tillard and Lieutenant Mark Somerville; another was destroyed with the aircrew recovered, while several others were damaged. Consequently, only seven were able to face the main Luftwaffe force of 34 aircraft, while an attack just before dark was driven off by two aircraft and heavy fire from the ships. The convoy survived without serious damage; the only casualties were to mines, with the Empire Song sunk and New Zealand Star damaged but able to reach port. Ark Royal underwent another aerial attack on 12 May during her return to Gibraltar. Later that month, fellow aircraft carrier Furious and she delivered Hawker Hurricanes to support Malta.

=== Hunting the Bismarck ===
On 18 May 1941, German battleship Bismarck and heavy cruiser Prinz Eugen began Operation Rheinübung by breaking into the Atlantic to raid shipping. After sinking the battlecruiser Hood and damaging the battleship Prince of Wales during the Battle of the Denmark Strait, Bismarck shook off her pursuers and headed for the French Atlantic coast. Ark Royal, Renown, and Sheffield—accompanied by destroyers Faulknor, Foresight, Forester, Fortune, Foxhound, and Fury—were dispatched to the Atlantic on 23 May to search for the battleship. On 26 May, a Swordfish from Ark Royal located Bismarck and began to shadow her, while the Home Fleet was mobilised to pursue.

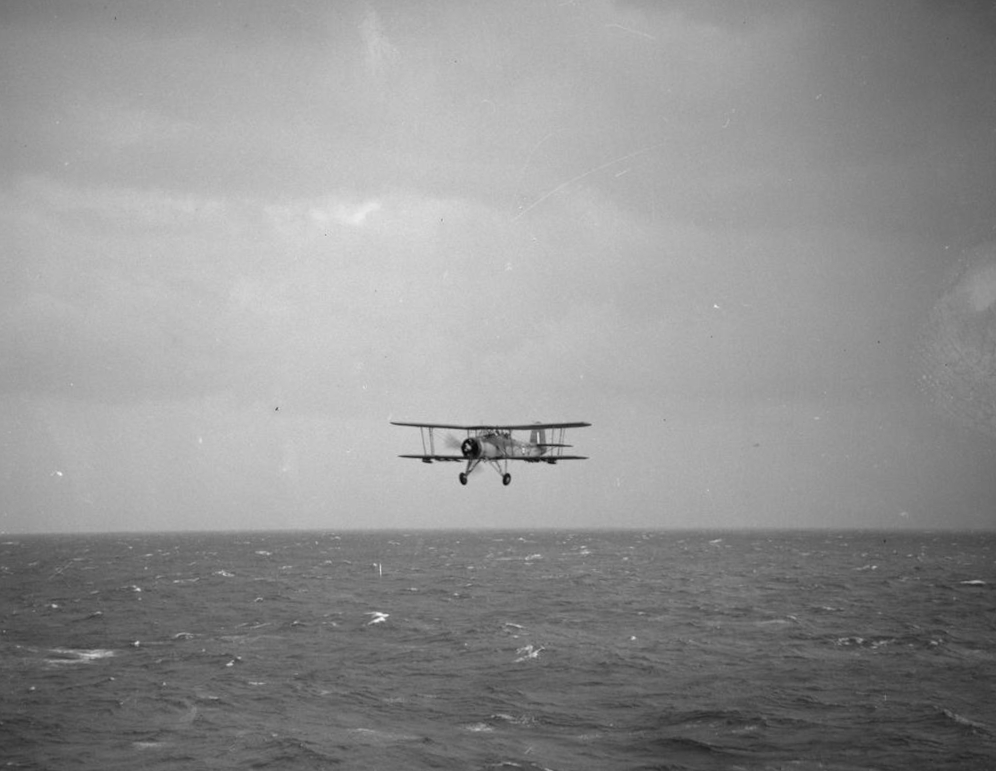
One of Ark Royal's Fairey Swordfish returns at low level over the sea after making a torpedo attack on Bismarck.

At the time of detection, the British ships were 130 nmi (240 km; 150 mi) away and would not catch Bismarck before she reached Saint-Nazaire, putting her safely under the air cover of the Luftwaffe once in range and while being repaired at the Normandie drydock. Fifteen Swordfish bombers were armed with torpedoes and sent to delay the ship. Sheffield, also shadowing Bismarck, was between Ark Royal and Bismarck. The aircraft mistook the British cruiser for their target and fired torpedoes. The torpedoes were fitted with unreliable magnetic detonators, which caused most to explode on contact with the water, while Sheffield evaded the rest. After realising his mistake, one of the pilots signalled 'Sorry for the kipper' to Sheffield.

On return to the carrier, the Swordfish were rearmed with contact-detonator warhead torpedoes, and launched at 19:15 for a second attack, locating and attacking Bismarck just before sunset. Three torpedoes hit the battleship; two detonated forward of the engine rooms, while the third struck the starboard steering compartment and jammed her rudder in a 15° port turn. Bismarck was forced to sail in circles until a combination of alternating propeller speeds was found that would keep her on a reasonably steady course, which in the prevailing force 8 wind and sea state, forced her to sail towards the British warships with almost no manoeuvring capability. The German battleship was harassed by British destroyers during the night of 26–27 May and suffered heavy attack the next morning, finally sinking at 10:39 on 27 May.

=== Escorting the Malta convoys ===
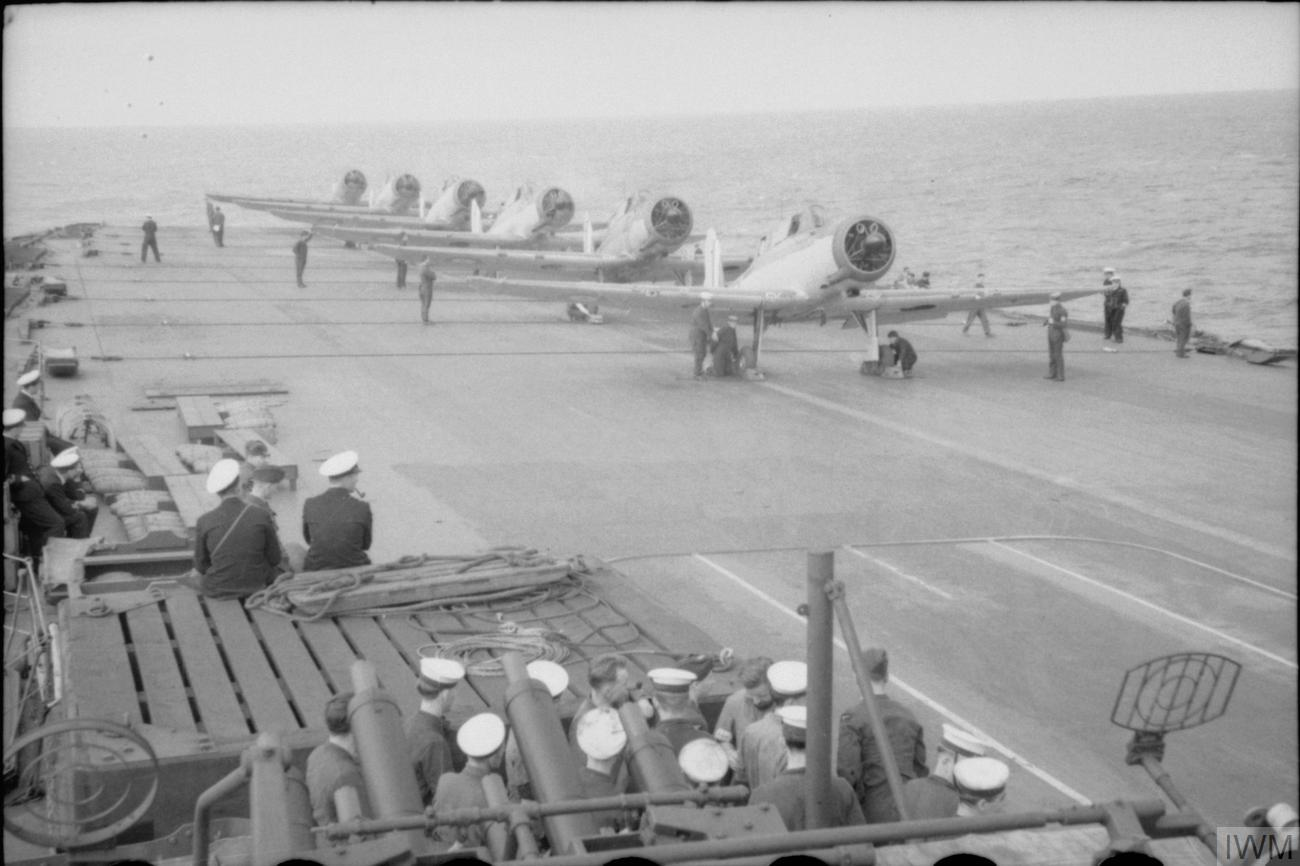
Six Blackburn Skuas of No. 800 Squadron Fleet Air Arm lined up on deck before taking off

Ark Royal and the ships of Force H returned to Gibraltar on 29 May 1941. Despite the boost in Allied morale from the sinking of the battleship Bismarck, the war in the Mediterranean was going against the Allies. Greece and Crete had fallen to the Axis Powers, and the Afrika Korps were preparing to launch a final push into Egypt. Malta remained an important stronghold in the Mediterranean, but was coming under increased pressure from Italian and German air attacks and could not be supplied from the east since the Battle of Crete.

Ark Royal was pressed into service, delivering aircraft to Malta during several supply runs throughout June and July, escorting the convoys of Operation Substance in July and Operation Halberd in September. Despite some losses, the convoys kept Malta supplied and fighting. The Allied presence in Malta was a considerable problem for Rommel in Africa, who was losing as much as 1/3 of his supplies from Italy to submarines and bombers based there. Adolf Hitler decided to send a flotilla of U-boats into the Mediterranean to attack Allied shipping, against the advice of Großadmiral (Grand Admiral) Raeder.

== Final voyage and sinking ==
On 10 November 1941, Ark Royal ferried more aircraft to Malta before returning to Gibraltar. Admiral Somerville had been warned of U-boats off the Spanish coast, so he reminded Force H to be vigilant. Also at sea was Friedrich Guggenberger's U-81, which had received a report that Force H was returning to Gibraltar.

On 13 November, at 15:40, the sonar operator aboard the destroyer Legion detected an unidentified sound, but assumed it was the propellers of a nearby destroyer. One minute later, Ark Royal was struck amidships by a torpedo, between the fuel bunkers and bomb store, and directly below the bridge island. The explosion caused Ark Royal to shake, hurled loaded torpedo-bombers into the air, and killed 44-year-old Able Seaman Edward Mitchell, the only man to die in the sinking. The torpedo punched a 130 ft × 30 ft (40 m × 9 m) hole in the ship's bottom and starboard side below the water line after running deep and hitting the bilge keel, inboard of the side protection system. The hit caused flooding of the starboard boiler room, main switchboard, oil tanks, and over 106 feet (32 m) of the ship's starboard bilge. The explosion knocked out all internal communications and the starboard power train, causing the rear half of the ship to lose power.

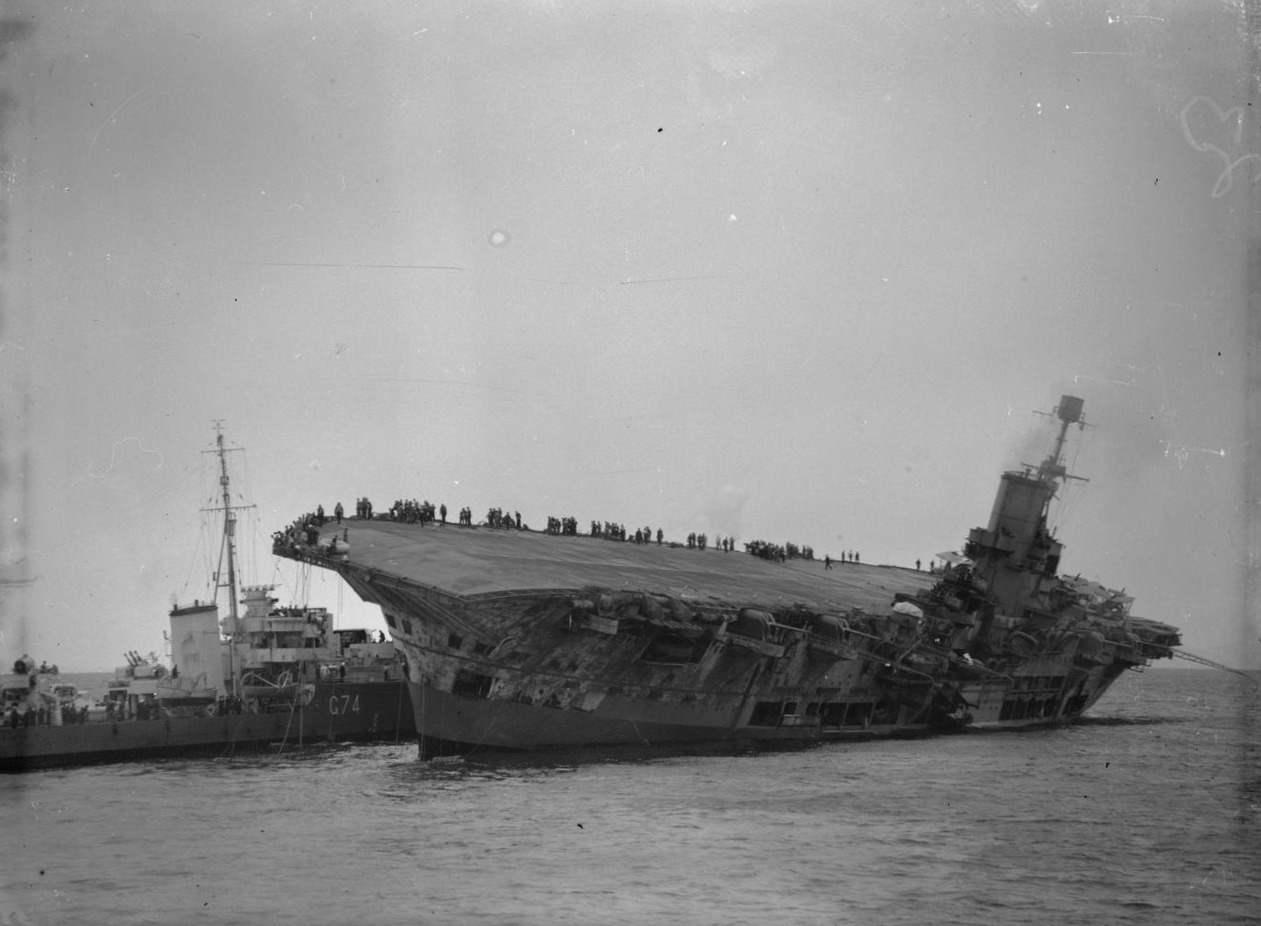
Legion moving alongside the damaged and listing Ark Royal to take off survivors

Immediately after the torpedo strike, Captain Maund ordered the engines to full stop, but with the communications knocked out, had to send a runner to the engine room. The ship's continued motion enlarged the hole in the hull, and by the time Ark Royal stopped, she had taken on a great deal of water and begun to list to starboard, reaching 18° from centre within 20 minutes. Considering the list of Ark Royal, and the fact that other carriers, including Courageous and Glorious, had sunk rapidly with heavy loss of life, Maund gave the order to abandon ship. The crew were assembled on the flight deck to determine who would remain on board to try to save the ship, while Legion came alongside to take off the rest. As a result, comprehensive damage-control measures were not initiated until 49 minutes after the attack. The flooding spread unchecked, exacerbated by covers and hatches left open during evacuation of the lower decks.

Water spread to the centreline boiler room, which started to flood from below, and power was lost shipwide when the boiler uptakes became choked; Ark Royal had no backup diesel generators. About half an hour after the explosion, the carrier appeared to stabilise. Admiral Somerville, determined to save Ark Royal, ordered damage-control parties back to the carrier before taking the battleship Malaya to Gibraltar to organise salvage efforts. The damage control parties relit a boiler, restoring power to the bilge pumps. The destroyer Laforey came alongside to provide power and additional pumps, while Swordfish aircraft from Gibraltar flew overhead to supplement antisubmarine patrols. The tug Thames arrived from Gibraltar at 20:00 and attached a tow line to Ark Royal, but the flooding had caused the ship to list more severely. Rising water reached the boiler room fan flat, an uninterrupted compartment running the width of the ship. This forced the shutdown of the restored boiler.

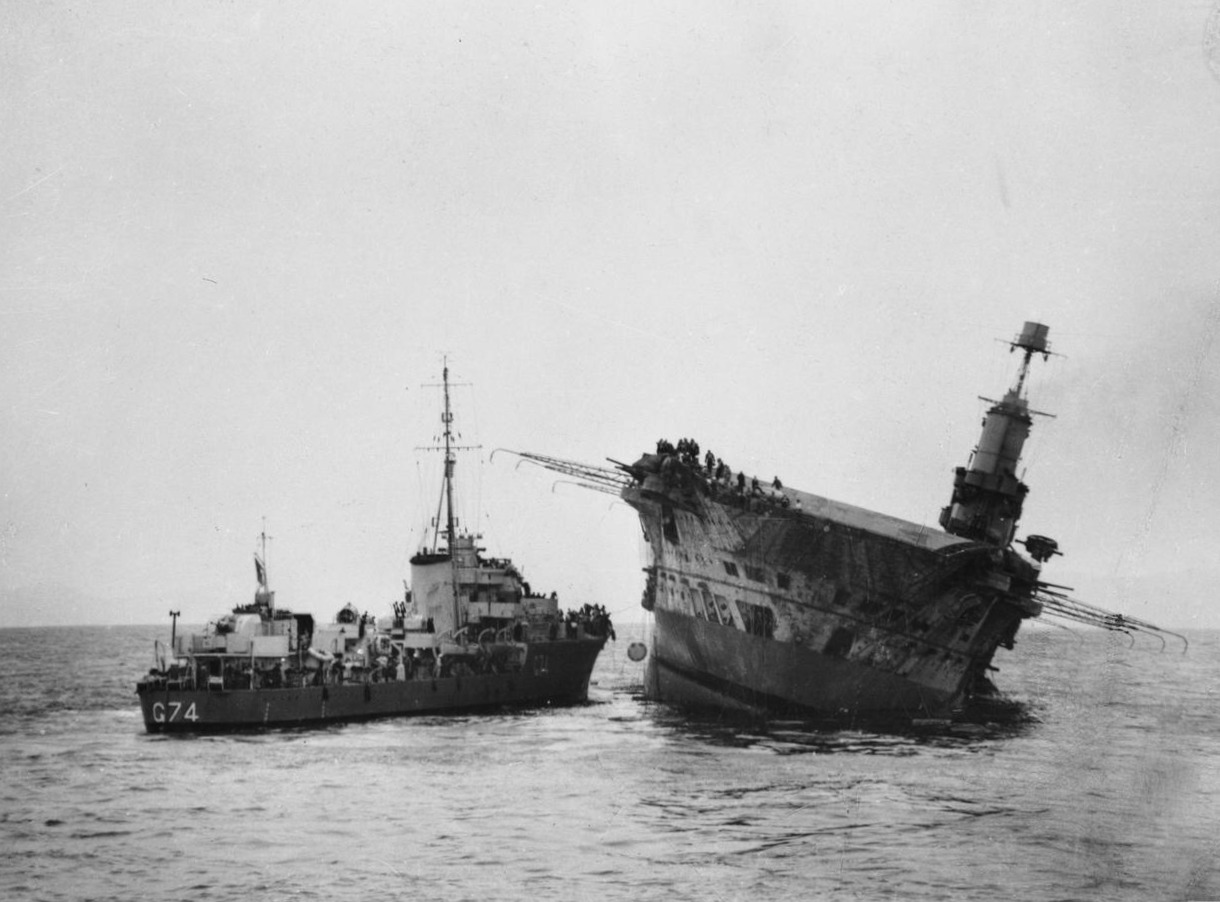
Another photograph showing the degree of the list

The list reached 20° between 02:05 and 02:30, and when "abandon ship" was declared again at 04:00, had reached 27°. Ark Royal's complement had been evacuated to Legion by 04:30; with the exception of Mitchell, no fatalities occurred. The 1,487 officers and crew were transported to Gibraltar. The list reached 45° before Ark Royal capsized and sank at 06:19 on 14 November. Witnesses reported the carrier rolling to 90°, where she remained for three minutes before inverting. Ark Royal then broke in two, the aft sinking within a few minutes, followed by the bow. This was the final or only ship sinking that Unsinkable Sam survived.

=== Investigation ===
A board of inquiry was established to investigate the loss. Based on its findings, Captain Loben Maund was court-martialled in February 1942. He was found guilty on two counts of negligence, one of failing to ensure that properly constituted damage-control parties had remained on board after the general evacuation and one of failing to ensure the ship was in a sufficient state of readiness to deal with possible damage. The board tempered their judgement with an acknowledgement that a high standard was being expected of Maund, and that he was primarily concerned with the welfare of his crew.

The Bucknill Committee, which had been set up to investigate the loss of major warships, also produced a report. It said that the lack of backup power sources was a major design failure, which contributed to the loss: Ark Royal depended on electricity for much of her operation, and once the boilers and steam-driven dynamos were knocked out, the loss of power made damage control difficult. The committee recommended the design of the bulkheads and boiler intakes be improved to decrease the risk of widespread flooding in boiler rooms and machine spaces, while the uninterrupted boiler-room flat was criticised. The design flaws were rectified in the Illustrious- and Implacable-class aircraft carriers, under construction at the time.

The board of inquiry closed its report with the observation that Ark Royal had sunk 22 nautical miles (25 mi; 41 km) east of Europa Point, the southernmost tip of Gibraltar. This was accepted as the wreck location for 60 years.

== Rediscovery ==
The location of the wreck was undetermined until mid-December 2002, when the wreck was discovered by an underwater survey company, C & C Technologies, Inc, using a sonar-equipped autonomous underwater vehicle, 30 nautical miles (35 mi; 56 km) from Gibraltar, around 3,300 feet (1,000 m) deep. The company had been contracted by the BBC as part of a documentary on maritime archaeology related to major battles of the RN. The Ark Royal wreck lies in two main pieces with the stern section sitting upright and the bow section upside down. 66 feet (20 m) of the bow is separated from the rest of the ship's hull. A large debris field, which includes the funnel and bridge island, parts of the ship that came loose as the carrier sank, and aircraft from the hangars, lies between the two hull sections. Analysis revealed that the port side of the ship hit the seabed first.

The wreck was found further east than expected. Researchers originally thought the wreck had been carried by currents farther into the Mediterranean as she sank—that the ship had travelled eastwards underwater before reaching the seabed. The presence near the hull pieces of other debris, including a Swordfish bomber that was tipped off the flight deck before the ship rolled, proved this false. If the current had pushed the hull pieces any significant distance sideways as they sank, debris would have been spread over a much wider area. Eastward currents seem to have affected her progress towards Gibraltar during the time she was under tow.

Study of the wreck also showed that restarting the engines to provide power increased the stresses placed on the hull, adding to the flooding. Once power was then lost, preventing the ship from sinking became impossible; her fate was more the result of design flaws than of the actions of her captain.
