= Winifred Spink =

UK woman MI6 officer in Russia in World War One

Winifred Spink was a MI6 officer. She was the first female officer sent to Russia, serving from 1916 to 1917, and subsequently assigned to Italy until the end of the First World War.

== Family and education ==
Winifred 'Winnie' Verena Spink was born 6 December 1885 in Sevenoaks, UK. Her father, Samuel Spink, was from the wealthy family that owned Spink & Son and a member of the Plymouth Brethren. Her Swiss-born mother, Elise (née Höfer) died in 1899 and her father swiftly remarried the family's young nursemaid. He sent Winifred and her four siblings to live in Bromley, away from his second family. Winifred was later sent to a finishing school in Zurich, Switzerland, supervised by her mother's family. She refused to follow her father's idea of immediate marriage and adopted the views of the suffragette movement. She initially studied French at University of Lausanne and then from 1911 - 1913 at the Sorbonne University in France, where she met up with Emmeline and Christabel Pankhurst who were there on holiday. She also met with fr:Georges Pancol, a poet, and they became engaged. Spink returned to the UK in January 1913. She attended several suffragette events and also trained at the Pitman's Secretarial School in English, French and German. From August 1914 she worked as a secretary, as well as studying economics at the London School of Economics and training as a car mechanic.

== Career in MI6 ==
In June 1916, aged 31, Spink was recruited to MI6, recommended to its head Mansfield Smith-Cumming by Colonel Walter Bersey for whom she was working. At the time it was known as MI1(c), part of the War Office. In July she was sent to Petrograd with Sir Samuel and Lady Maud Hoare to be the only woman working at the British intelligence mission. Samuel Hoare was the new head of mission, liaising with the Russian secret service. Spink worked as a clerk on reports and card indexes of travellers between the UK and Russia, also learning Russian and volunteering in the Anglo-Russian Hospital. She kept a diary during her time in Russia. In late 1915 she received news that her fiancé had been killed in action. During 1916 she became romantically involved with several men, including Lionel Reid, the Mission's office manager.

In March 1917 Spink was moved to Moscow, and while she was there the February Revolution started in Petrograd, then spread to Moscow. She and Reid, who had become engaged while in Moscow, left by train back to Petrograd on 15 March. She continued to work at the British mission, aware of the difficulty with violence and food shortages in the city but still able to visit the cinema, opera, ballet and dine out with friends. She saw Vladimir Lenin speaking to the public from the balcony of the headquarters of the Bolshevik Party. In June, the British ambassador George Buchanan was replaced by Arthur Henderson and Spink was seconded as his private secretary and attended many meetings that he held where she probably also acted as translator. Suffragettes Emmeline Pankhurst and Jessie Kenney arrived in June. Spink was invited to a reception Pankhurst held. Henderson returned to the UK in July, with Buchanan returning as ambassador and Spink returned to intelligence work. As she and her fiancé returned to the British Intelligence Mission from a concert later that month past crowds listening to public speakers, they narrowly avoided being caught up in a serious attack by soldiers on these crowds. Food was now rationed and she became ill. She returned to the UK in August 1917.

After recovering her health she went to work for Hoare in Rome, where he represented MI5 and MI6. Her fiancé Reid remained in Russia but returned to London in June 1918, while she was in Rome. He returned to Russia and in February 1919 she heard that he had married. Spink was awarded a medal for her intelligence work in Petrograd and Rome. She returned to intelligence work briefly in 1939.

== Later life ==
She worked as a secretary for Maurice Baring and Hilaire Belloc in the 1920s. In 1926 she married William G. Ramplee-Smith of the Royal Naval Reserve. They had a son together, before Ramplee-Smith died in 1935 while at sea, and Spink returned to work to support herself and their son as private secretary to Lady Hoare until 1939. Spink later moved to San Francisco in the USA. She died in Reading, UK in July 1973 aged 87.
