= Samuel Hoare, 1st Viscount Templewood =

British politician (1880–1959)

The Right Honourable The Viscount Templewood GCSI GBE CMG PC JP
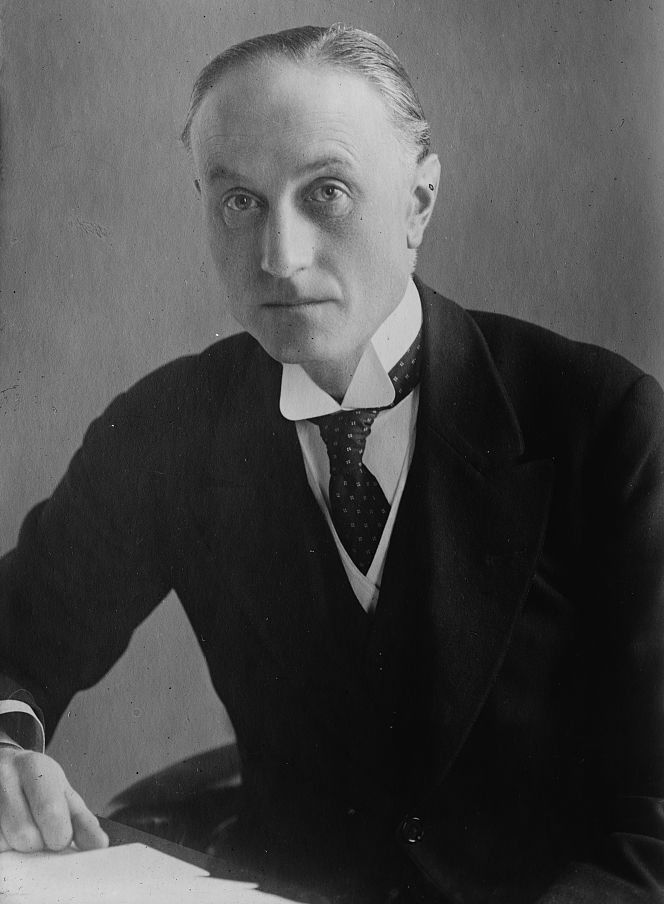

Secretary of State for Air
- In office 3 April 1940 – 10 May 1940
- Prime Minister: Neville Chamberlain
- Preceded by: Kingsley Wood
- Succeeded by: Archibald Sinclair
- In office 6 December 1924 – 4 June 1929
- Prime Minister: Stanley Baldwin
- Preceded by: The Lord Thomson
- Succeeded by: The Lord Thomson
- In office 31 October 1922 – 22 January 1924
- Prime Minister: Stanley Baldwin
- Preceded by: Frederick Guest
- Succeeded by: The Lord Thomson

First Lord of the Admiralty
- In office June 1936 – 28 October 1937
- Prime Minister: Stanley Baldwin; Neville Chamberlain
- Preceded by: The Viscount Monsell
- Succeeded by: Duff Cooper

Lord Privy Seal
- In office 3 September 1939 – 3 April 1940
- Prime Minister: Neville Chamberlain
- Preceded by: Sir John Anderson
- Succeeded by: Kingsley Wood

Home Secretary
- In office 28 May 1937 – 3 September 1939
- Prime Minister: Stanley Baldwin; Neville Chamberlain
- Preceded by: Sir John Simon
- Succeeded by: Sir John Anderson

Foreign Secretary
- In office 7 June 1935 – 18 December 1935
- Prime Minister: Stanley Baldwin
- Preceded by: Sir John Simon
- Succeeded by: Anthony Eden

Secretary of State for India
- In office 25 August 1931 – 7 June 1935
- Prime Minister: Ramsay MacDonald
- Preceded by: The Viscount Peel
- Succeeded by: The Marquess of Zetland

Member of the House of Lords
- Lord Temporal
- Hereditary peerage 14 July 1944 – 7 May 1959

Member of Parliament for Chelsea
- In office 15 January 1910 – 14 July 1944
- Preceded by: Emslie Horniman
- Succeeded by: William Sidney

Personal details
- Born: Samuel John Gurney Hoare; 24 February 1880 London, England
- Died: 7 May 1959 (aged 79) London, England
- Party: Conservative
- Spouse: Lady Maud Lygon
- Parent: Sir Samuel Hoare, 1st Baronet (father)
- Education: New College, Oxford

Military service
- Allegiance: United Kingdom
- Branch/service: British Army
- Years of service: 1916–1918
- Rank: Lieutenant-Colonel
- Unit: Norfolk Yeomanry; Royal Army Service Corps
- Battles/wars: World War I

Samuel John Gurney Hoare, 1st Viscount Templewood (24 February 1880 – 7 May 1959), more commonly known as Sir Samuel Hoare, was a senior British Conservative politician who served in various Cabinet posts in the Conservative and National governments of the 1920s and 1930s. He was ambitious and his expedience and flexibility gave him a reputation for being unprincipled and two-faced, being nicknamed "Slippery Sam" or "Soapy Sam".

Hoare was Secretary of State for Air during most of the 1920s. As Secretary of State for India in the early 1930s, he authored the Government of India Act 1935, which granted self-government at a provincial level to India. He was most famous for serving as Foreign Secretary in 1935, when he authored the Hoare–Laval Pact with French Prime Minister Pierre Laval. This partially recognised the Italian conquest of Abyssinia (modern Ethiopia) and Hoare was forced to resign by the ensuing public outcry. In 1936 he returned to the Cabinet as First Lord of the Admiralty, then served as Home Secretary from 1937 to 1939 and was again briefly Secretary of State for Air in 1940. He was seen as a leading "appeaser" and his removal from office (along with that of Sir John Simon and of Neville Chamberlain as Prime Minister) was a condition of Labour's agreement to serve in a coalition government in May 1940.

Hoare also served as British ambassador to Spain from 1940 to 1944.

== Youth ==
Hoare was born in London on 24 February 1880, the eldest son of Sir Samuel Hoare, 1st Baronet, who was a Conservative MP from a by-election in 1886 until 1906, and to whose baronetcy he succeeded in 1915. His family were the Anglo-Irish branch of an old Quaker family, with a long history of involvement in banking. He was a descendant of Samuel Hoare, but the family had abandoned Quakerism in the mid-18th century and Hoare was brought up an Anglo-Catholic.

Hoare was educated at Harrow School, where he was a classical scholar, and New College, Oxford. As an undergraduate he was awarded a blue in racquets and was a member of the Gridiron and Bullingdon Clubs. Initially he studied classics, taking a first in Mods in 1901, before switching to Modern History, graduating with a first class B.A. in 1903. He was awarded his M.A. in 1910. He later became an Honorary Fellow of New College.

Michael Bloch comments that Hoare was "indubitably homosexual", but being highly ambitious and discreet (his nickname amongst colleagues was 'Slippery Sam'), may not have acted much upon it. On 17 October 1909, he married Lady Maud Lygon (1882–1962), youngest daughter of The 6th Earl Beauchamp. Their marriage was childless. It was, in the words of R. J. Q. Adams, "not at first a love match" but in time became "a devoted partnership". His biographer has stated, "it would probably be more appropriate to describe it as a mariage de convenance". Hoare inherited Sidestrand Hall in 1915. His London home was 18 Cadogan Gardens.

Hoare was short, slightly built and a dapper dresser. As a youth he took up games to bolster his physique, including figure skating. He became a tournament-level shot and tennis player. He was a poor speaker but a good writer. He was hard-working but cold.

== Early political career ==
In 1905, Hoare's father arranged for him to be secretary to the Colonial Secretary Alfred Lyttelton to gain political experience. Hoare stood unsuccessfully in the 1906 General Election for Parliament at Ipswich, but became a justice of the peace for the county of Norfolk that year.

Hoare entered local politics in March 1907, when he was elected to the London County Council as a member of the Municipal Reform Party, the local government wing of the Conservative Party, representing Brixton. He served as Chairman of the London Fire Brigade Committee. He served on the LCC until 1910.

Hoare was elected to the House of Commons at the January 1910 general election as Member of Parliament (MP) for Chelsea. In the early years, he was a member of the Anti-Socialist Union.

During the Conservative Party leadership contest of November 1911, Hoare wrote pledging support to both leading candidates, Austen Chamberlain and Walter Long. There is no evidence that he made such an offer to Bonar Law, who became leader after the two front-runners withdrew to avoid a potential party split. Hoare showed little interest in the two largest issues of the day: House of Lords reform and Irish Home Rule. He supported tariff reform, female suffrage and public education. He opposed Welsh disestablishment quite strongly. He encouraged colleagues to call him "Sam" at the time to soften his hard and detached image.

Hoare was on the left wing of the Conservative party and once described himself as "a liberal amongst conservatives and a conservative amongst liberals". He joined the Unionist Social Reform Committee. Hoare held markedly "progressive" views, outside the mainstream of the Conservative Party, on issues such as education and penal reform. He was almost alone amongst the Conservatives in advocating the abolition of the death penalty.

== First World War ==
Aged 34 at the time, Hoare joined the Army soon after the outbreak of the First World War. He was commissioned into the Norfolk Yeomanry as a temporary lieutenant on 17 October 1914. To his disappointment, he was initially only a recruiting officer and illness prevented him from serving at the front. He was promoted to temporary captain on 24 April 1915.

While acting as a recruiting officer, he learnt Russian. In 1916, he was recruited by Mansfield Cumming to be the future MI6's liaison officer with the Russian Intelligence service in Petrograd (now Saint Petersburg). He soon became head of the British Intelligence Mission to the Russian General Staff with the temporary rank of lieutenant-colonel. He was accompanied by Lady Maud and Winifred Spink. In his post, he reported to the British government the death of Rasputin and apologised, because of the sensational nature of the event, for having written it in the style of the Daily Mail.

In March 1917 he was posted to Rome, where he remained until the end of the war. His duties included helping to dissuade Italy from dropping out of the war. In Italy, he administered the subsidisation of the former socialist leader Benito Mussolini's interventionist newspaper, Il Popolo d'Italia, with a wage of £100 per week (equivalent to £5998 in 2026).

For his services in the war, Hoare was twice mentioned in despatches, appointed Commander of the Order of St Michael and St George (CMG) in 1917, and awarded the Orders of St Anne and St Stanislas of Russia, and of St Maurice and St Lazarus of Italy.

== Interwar period ==
=== Secretary of State for Air ===
Hoare was re-elected to Parliament in 1918 as a Conservative; his party were then in Coalition with the Lloyd George Liberals. During the Russian Civil War, he strongly supported the call by the War Secretary Winston Churchill (by all accounts the most anti-Communist member of Lloyd George's cabinet) for British intervention in the Russian Civil War on the side of Whites. On 31 May 1919, he wrote to Churchill to say: "For the last six months, I have been convinced that the whole future of Europe and indeed of the whole world depends upon the Russian settlement and the destruction of Bolshevism". In late 1921-early 1922, Hoare served as the deputy League of Nations commissioner for Russian refugees in Asia Minor, and was charged with finding a country willing to accept them. By October 1922, he had become disillusioned with David Lloyd George after the honours scandal and the Chanak Crisis. He helped organise the backbench revolt at the Carlton Club meeting (19 October 1922), which brought down the Lloyd George Coalition. In Bonar Law's new Conservative government he was made a Privy Councillor and Secretary of State for Air, but he was not made a member of the Cabinet until Stanley Baldwin succeeded Law as Prime Minister in May 1923.

In 1923, Hoare presided over the merger (with £1 million state subsidy) of the four principal private air carriers to form Imperial Airways, an ancestor of today's British Airways. The Conservatives fell from power in January 1924, but Hoare was once again Secretary of State for Air in Baldwin's Second Government (1924-1929). As Secretary of State for Air he sided with Lord Trenchard on the importance of the Royal Air Force remaining an independent service. Hoare often quarrelled with the First Sea Lord, Admiral Earl Beatty, over where to allocate defence expenditure, leading Beatty to label Hoare "an intriguing little brute" who was intent upon starving the Royal Navy of funds in order to build up the Royal Air Force. He established air squadrons at Oxford University and Cambridge University to train students as potential RAF officers and re-established a permanent air cadet college at Cranwell.

Lady Maud was awarded the DBE in February 1927, and Hoare was awarded the Knight Grand Cross of the British Empire (GBE) in June 1927. Hoare and Lady Maud travelled by air whenever possible, including the first civilian flight to India in 1927. In 1927 he published a book, India by Air. By 1929 there were regular scheduled routes to India and Cape Town.

Hoare continued his interest in aviation affairs as Honorary Air Commodore of No 601 (County of London) (1930–32) and No 604 (County of Middlesex) (1932–57) Bomber Squadrons of the Auxiliary Air Force.

=== In opposition ===
Hoare was treasurer of the Conservative Party in opposition in 1929–1931.

In 1930, he published The Fourth Seal on World War I Russia.

Hoare was a delegate to the First Round Table Conference on India's constitutional future in 1930–1931. He also helped to mediate between Baldwin and the press barons Lords Rothermere and Beaverbrook, who were intriguing for his removal as Conservative leader.

=== Secretary of State for India ===
Hoare was one of the Conservative negotiators in talks with Ramsay MacDonald in August 1931 over the formation of the National Government. On 26 August 1931 Hoare was appointed Secretary of State for India.

At the Second Round Table Conference, Hoare enjoyed good relations with Mahatma Gandhi. As India Secretary, Hoare was mostly concerned with the Indian Communist Party, which led him to favour the Congress Party as the best alternative. He committed Britain to eventual self-government for India, but that was not enough for Gandhi, who wanted full independence. Lord Lothian's report on the extension of the Indian franchise was considered. A major issue that derailed the Round Table talks was the demand that the Indian Muslims along with the Dalits (untouchable caste) be awarded separate electorates, a demand that Gandhi rejected. When Gandhi told Hoare in September 1932 that he would "fast unto death" rather than accept a separate electorate for the untouchable caste, Hoare replied: "The dogs bark, the caravan moves on". A White Paper containing the government's legislative proposals for India's constitution was drawn up in March 1933. A Select Committee of Both Houses began to meet for over a year and half in April 1933 to consider the government's plans. In January 1934, Hoare was appointed Knight Grand Commander of the Star of India (GCSI) in the New Year Honours. At his meeting with Ivan Maisky, the new Soviet ambassador, in 1932, Hoare told him: "It would be extremely difficult to persuade the Conservatives in this country [to adopt] a pro-Russian policy if the Soviet government failed to eliminate the source of the trouble which has often poisoned relations in the past", by which he meant the Comintern support for the British Communist Party.

Hoare's Indian policy faced much opposition from the "die hard" right-wing of the Conservative Party, with whom Winston Churchill allied himself. Ill feeling between Hoare and Churchill reached its peak in April 1934. The British government proposed for the Indian government to retain the power to impose tariffs on British textiles. The Manchester Chamber of Commerce, representing the Lancashire cotton trade, initially opposed that since it wanted Lancashire goods to be exported freely to India. Churchill accused Hoare of having, with the aid of the Earl of Derby, breached parliamentary privilege by improperly influencing the Manchester Chamber of Commerce to drop its opposition. Churchill was refused the right to question some witnesses, some documents which he requested were not produced and some of his written evidence was suppressed as contrary to the public interest. It was ruled that Churchill was correct that Hoare and Derby had pressured the Manchester Chamber of Commerce to withdraw their paper objecting to the White Paper, but as the Joint Select Committee was not a judicial committee it was not a breach of privilege to pressure witnesses. Hoare complained that “I do not know which is the more offensive or mischievous, Winston or his son (Randolph Churchill, who was then a journalist)." After Hoare's exoneration by the Committee on Privileges, Churchill gave a powerful speech in the Commons Chamber that attacked the committee's findings. On 13 June 1934, Leo Amery spoke, arguing that Churchill's true aim was to bring down the government under the cover of the doctrine fiat justicia ruat caelum ("may justice be done, though the heavens fall"). Churchill, who was neither a lawyer nor a classicist, growled "translate it!" Amery replied that it meant "If I can trip up Sam, the Government's bust". The ensuing laughter made Churchill look ridiculous.

The Select Committee of Both Houses finished its deliberations in November 1934. The result was one of the most complicated pieces of legislation in British parliamentary history, a bill that spent the first half of 1935 passing through Parliament before becoming the Government of India Act 1935. The Bill contained 473 clauses and 16 schedules, and the debates took up 4,000 pages of Hansard. Hoare had to answer 15,000 questions and make 600 speeches and completely dominated the committee stage of the bill, just as he had during the Round Table Conferences, by his mastery of detail and his skill at dealing tactfully with deputations. Alec Douglas-Home, later to be Prime Minister, commented in his autobiography, "The most noteworthy performance of that Parliament was without question the piloting of the India Independence Bill through the House of Commons by the Secretary of State, Sir Samuel Hoare, ably assisted by Mr. R. A. Butler (later Lord Butler)". Butler, who, as Under-Secretary, had helped to steer the bill through the Commons, later wrote of Hoare that he saw life as "a chapter in a great Napoleonic biography" and added "I was amazed by his ambition; I admired his imagination; I shared his ideals; I stood in awe of his intellectual capacity. But I was never touched by his humanity. He was the coldest fish with whom I ever had to deal".

Hoare was widely praised for his conduct as India Secretary but was close to exhaustion after the difficult passage of the Bill and opposition by Churchill and by many rank-and-file Conservatives. The Act became law in August 1935, when Hoare had moved on to his next position.

Although provincial governments were elected in 1937, the planned federation of Indian States was never set up; the Act was never fully implemented because of the outbreak of the Second World War in 1939.

=== Foreign Secretary ===
In June 1935, Baldwin became prime minister for the third time. He offered Hoare a choice of the job of Viceroy of India or Foreign Secretary. Hoare, who was ambitious to become Prime Minister, chose the latter to enable him to remain active in domestic politics. The position would later make him notorious. Hoare's exhausting time as India Secretary had given him little chance to study foreign affairs, and as Foreign Secretary he tended to follow the advice given to him by Robert Vansittart, the Permanent Undersecretary at the Foreign Office who saw Italy as a potential ally against Germany. Vansittart argued to Hoare that Italy could threaten British control of the Mediterranean Sea and hence the sea-lanes running through the Mediterranean to the Suez Canal, Egypt and the Red Sea to the Indian Ocean that linked Britain to its colonies in Asia. Although the bombast of the Italian dictator Benito Mussolini was not taken very seriously in Britain, Italy, which also controlled Libya, straddled Britain's sea route across the Mediterranean. In particular, Vansittart stressed that deployment of naval forces to deter Japan (the Singapore strategy) depended upon a friendly Italy not challenging Britain in the Mediterranean. Finally, Vansittart argued that Italy was the chief supporter of Austria against German ambitions for an Anschluss (e.g. in 1934 when Italy had deployed troops to the Brenner Pass to deter Germany) and that a friendly Italy would allow France to concentrate its forces on the Rhineland. For all reasons, Vansittart argued that Ethiopia would have to be sacrificed to win the friendship of Italy. The historian John Charmley argued it was no accident that Hoare along with other "appeasers" such as Lord Halifax and Sir John Simon had devoted significant parts of their careers to India, which he stated influenced their conduct of foreign affairs, writing: "In both case, nationalists were to be negotiated with until their lowest demands could be discovered and provided they were low enough granted. Nehru, Gandhi, and Hitler, however much the contemporary mind rejects the equation, had much in common to British ministers between the wars".

Hoare took office against a backdrop of what R.J.Q. Adams described as "much idle talk" of "mutual security". In March 1935, MacDonald's White Paper had committed Britain to limited rearmament. Hoare expressed much distrust of the Soviet Foreign Commissar Maxim Litvinov, who under the guise of collective security via the League of Nations, had been attempting to build up a bloc against aggression. Hoare believed that Litvinov was engaged in an "intrigue" intended to wreck the possibility of Anglo-German understanding and an arms control pact as he felt that the real aim behind Litvinov's foreign policy was to manipulate the Western nations into going to war with each other to allow the Soviet Union to dominate Europe.

In April 1935, the then Prime Minister Ramsay MacDonald and Foreign Secretary Sir John Simon had signed the Stresa Front on 14 April 1935, an alliance with France and Italy (which had joined the Allies in World War One). However, the Stresa Front did not last. It came to nothing after Britain, without consulting the other members, signed the Anglo-German Naval Agreement. That dismayed France, which soon signed a Franco-Soviet Treaty of Mutual Assistance. On 19 June 1935, Hoare suggested to the cabinet in a prototype of the Hoare-Laval pact that the Ethiopian emperor Haile Selassie be offered the port city of Zeila in the colony of British Somaliland (modern northern Somalia) in exchange for him ceding most of his empire to Italy. At this state, Hoare told the cabinet that he wanted a resolution to the crisis that "would not destroy Abyssinian independence but gave Italy some satisfaction". Besides the gathering Abyssinia crisis, Hoare was concerned with pushing through over the opposition of some of his civil servants a loan to China, arguing that building up China's strength was crucial to restraining Japan, which had been aggressive in trying to claim all of Asia as being in the Japanese sphere of influence. Hoare was also well aware that the Soviet Union tended despite the Chinese Civil War to support the Kuomintang government in Nanking against the Japanese claims, and he had been arguing since 1932 that Britain needed to do more to support China in order to prevent China from falling into an alliance with Moscow.

By mid-1935, Mussolini was clearly preparing to attack Abyssinia. For purely self-interested reasons, Baldwin-a prime minister not noted for his interest in foreign affairs-decided to make support for the League of Nations and its policy of collective security the centrepiece of the coming general election. The Labour Party had a platform that somewhat contradictorily called for both disarmament and support for collective security, and Baldwin intended to win the general election by quite ruthlessly exposing that contradiction. Hence as the Abyssinia crisis gathered steam, both Baldwin and Hoare gave speeches stressing that Britain was committed to a policy of collective security via the League of Nations up to and including war. On 12 September 1935 Hoare gave what Adams calls "the greatest speech of his career" to the League of Nations General Assembly at Geneva. He declared: "The League stands and my country stands with it, for the collective maintenance of the Covenant in its entirety and particularly for steady and collective resistance to all acts of unprovoked aggression". His speech was very well received and promoted much cheering from those who heard it. Hoare did not believe in the contents of his speech, saying afterwards in private that the Baldwin government would take a different position on the Abyssinia crisis after the general election was won. In a dispatch to Sir George Clerk, the ambassador in Paris, Hoare stated: "It is essential that we should play out the League hand in September. If it is then found that there is no collective basis for sanctions, that is to say in particular that the French are not prepared to give their full co-operation...the world will have to face the fact that sanctions are impracticable...it must be the League not the British government that declares that sanctions are impracticable and the British government must on no account lay itself open to the charge we have not done our utmost to make them practical". His speech was widely praised in the world press but did not deter the full-scale Italian invasion of Abyssinia on 3 October. The League Council (the executive body of the League that played a role analogous to the United Nations Security Council) ruled that Italy had committed aggression against a fellow member of the League and that sanctions were to be imposed on Italy. Limited sanctions were imposed on Italy but excluded oil. A general election on 14 November 1935 had over 90% of the candidates support the League of Nations, and there was much support for sanctions against Italy although they were not necessarily in Britain's interests.

With the election out of the way, the government, with the agreement of the League Council, authorised Hoare to find a solution. The French premier Pierre Laval was not keen on sanctions on Italy while Hoare used the threat of Britain's veto power as a permanent member of the League Council to prevent oil from being added to the sanctions list. Laval's instincts were to stick with the alliance he had struck with Mussolini earlier that year, but General Maurice Gamelin advised him that an alliance with Italy would be "valuable" to France, but the help of Britain would be "essential", as France very badly needed the "continental commitment" (i.e. Britain to send a large expeditionary force to France) to win another war against Germany. As such, Gamelin argued that the Abyssinia crisis should be settled in a manner that did not estrange Britain. Under pressure from Gamelin, Laval attempted to "square the circle" by working out a deal that would allow France to be on good terms with both Britain and Italy. Hoare sent Sir Maurice Peterson, the head of the Foreign Office Abyssinia Department, to Paris to negotiate a compromise offer to Mussolini. An agreement was reached by the end of November: Italy was to gain territory in the north, with the rump of Abyssinia to be an Italian client state and its army under Italian control. Abyssinia had not been consulted. By December 1935, Hoare was still in poor health and suffering from fainting spells since the stressful period of passing the Government of India Act. Suffering from a serious infection, he stopped off in Paris on his way to a skating holiday in Switzerland. On the guise of stopping off for rest, Hoare secretly met with Laval to finish off the talks. His orders from the cabinet written in the third person were that it was hoped that "the Foreign Secretary would take a generous view of the Italian attitude". Hoare recalled that he was enchanted with Laval's "cunning peasant mind", saying that Laval very much lived up to his "horse trader" image, of a "fixer" who knew how to get what he wanted and to drive a hard bargain. Hoare was gratified that Laval was not committed to an all-out anti-German foreign policy, and he wanted an alliance with Italy to improve France's bargaining power in his talks with Adolf Hitler for a Franco-German settlement. The only issue Hoare had with Laval was that he reminded him very much of Lloyd George "with his incessant desire to deal behind everyone's back". The ensuing Hoare–Laval Pact with French Prime Minister Pierre Laval was unanimously approved by the Cabinet on 9–10 December.

It was leaked to the French and then to the British press, causing a public outcry, not least because of memories of Hoare's recent Geneva speech. Hoare, who had been injured in a skating accident, returned to Britain on 16 December. In the House of Commons, Hugh Dalton, the Labour shadow foreign secretary, called the Hoare-Laval Pact an attempt to "reward the declared aggressor at the expense of the victim, destroy collective security and conflict with the expressed will of the country and the Covenant". Faced with massive criticism both outside Parliament and from within as a group of Conservative backbenchers led by Austen Chamberlain denounced the Hoare-Laval Pact, Baldwin decided to sacrifice Hoare. The Cabinet met on the morning of 18 December. Lord Halifax, who was due to make a statement in the Lords that afternoon, insisted that Hoare resign to save the government's position, causing J. H. Thomas, William Ormsby-Gore and Walter Elliott to come out for Hoare's resignation as well. Privately, however, Halifax was puzzled by the moral outrage as the Hoare-Laval Pact was little different from proposals that had been put forward by the League Committee of Five.

Hoare resigned on 18 December. His successor was Anthony Eden. When Eden had his first audience with King George V, the King is said to have remarked humorously, "No more coals to Newcastle, no more Hoares to Paris." The Chancellor of the Exchequer, Neville Chamberlain, wrote to Lady Hoare to assure her that her husband would soon back into the cabinet and "in a short time his reputation will begin to rise again".

In his memoirs, Hoare admitted that his negotiations in Paris with Laval had caught him at a disadvantage. He noted that in the absence of the Hoare–Laval Pact, the Italians seized all of Abyssinia and drew closer to Germany, which eventually led to the destabilisation of Austria and the indefensibility of Czechoslovakia. The British historian David Dutton wrote that Hoare's reputation has never recovered from the Hoare-Laval Pact, which left him to this day with the image of an abject appeaser whose actions belied his noble words in support of collective security. Dutton argued some of the abuse directed against Hoare was unfair as Winston Churchill also supported sacrificing Ethiopia to win an alliance with Italy, and Churchill only criticised Hoare for the pact with Laval because of their prior disputes over the Government of India Act. Dutton noted that the Hoare-Laval Pact is something of a misnomer as the official who pushed it most strongly on the British side was Vansittart, a man generally considered to be an anti-appeaser whose main objective with the pact was to secure Italy as an ally against Germany. Likewise, Dutton noted that Eden as Foreign Secretary was willing to accept the German remilitarisation of the Rhineland in March 1936, which was of far greater importance than the Abyssinia crisis, but because Eden resigned as Foreign Secretary in 1938 and later served as Churchill's Foreign Secretary, he has a largely undeserved reputation as an anti-appeaser. Dutton wrote that much of the anger and abuse directed at Hoare was because of the contrast between a Foreign Secretary who promised to stop aggression in his speech in September 1935 versus the plan he devised with Laval in December 1935.

=== First Lord of the Admiralty ===
It was widely recognised that Hoare had been a scapegoat for Cabinet policy. His return to Baldwin's Cabinet as First Lord of the Admiralty in June 1936 was widely praised in the press. It was too quick for Halifax. Eden later wrote in his memoirs that Halifax "criticised Baldwin sharply for yielding to Hoare's importunity". Hoare vigorously endorsed Britain's naval rearmament, including ordering the first three King George V-class battleships, and worked to reverse the subordination of the British naval aviation to the Royal Air Force. As First Lord of the Admiralty, Hoare frequently fought with Eden over the policy to pursue towards the Spanish Civil War. Hoare still subscribed to the viewpoint that Italy was worth having as an ally and favoured paying lip service to the principle of non-intervention in Spain. Eden by contrast was more concerned about the prospect of Germany and/or Italy having bases in Spain, and he favoured a more vigorous approach to enforcing non-intervention. As Italy was the nation that intervened in Spain on the largest scale, Eden suggested several times imposing a blockade to prevent the Italians from landing more troops in Spain, a proposal that Hoare stoutly resisted. Mussolini sent 80,000 troops to Spain, by far the largest contingent of any power that intervened there; Germany by contrast only sent 19,000 troops to Spain. As First Lord of the Admiralty, Hoare was greatly influenced by the First Sea Lord, Admiral Ernle Chatfield, whose sympathies were with the Spanish Nationalists.

Hoare tended to share Chatfield's dislike of the Spanish Republic, writing: "For the present it seems clear that we should continue our existing policy of neutrality-When I speak of 'neutrality' I mean strict neutrality, that is to say a situation in which the Russians neither officially nor unofficially give help to the Communists. On no account must we do anything to bolster up Communism in Spain, particularly when it is remembered that Communism in Portugal, to which it would probably spread and particularly to Lisbon, would be a great danger to the British Empire". In contrast to Léon Blum in France, British leaders such as Hoare felt that the power to impose a naval blockade on Spain (a nation whose population exceeded its agricultural capacity, making Spain very dependent on food imported from abroad) would deter Franco from going too far with his alliance with Axis powers. Furthermore, the civil war devastated Spain and as Britain had the world's third largest economy at the time, it was felt that the appeal of the pound sterling would counter any pro-Axis tendencies in Nationalist Spain as it was believed Franco would not want to be too dependent economically on Germany and Italy for post-war reconstruction. Blum and other French leaders tended to feel that the prospect of a pro-Axis Spain as a neighbour would be a threat to France and were especially worried about the prospect of German and/or Italian bases in Spain as over one-third of the French Army was recruited in France's North African colonies, making control of the western Mediterranean Sea a crucial concern for France.

Much like Chatfield, Hoare saw the defence of Britain's Asian colonies as second only to the defence of the United Kingdom itself and he was a strong supporter of the Singapore Strategy. He believed that the loss of a colony such as Hong Kong would have such a disastrous effect on British prestige that it would lead to the rapid dissolution of the British empire. At the Imperial Conference in London in May–June 1937 held to honour the coronation of King George VI that was attended by all the Dominion prime ministers, Hoare starkly warned the Australian and New Zealand delegations if the Singapore strategy failed, it was guaranteed that both Australia and New Zealand would be conquered by Japan and turned into Japanese colonies. Hoare engaged in a thought experiment, asking what would happen if Japan went to war and there was no British fleet in Singapore, leading him to answer his question that the result would be a Japanese invasion of Australia backed by the "full strength of her naval and her naval air forces", Hoare went on to say: "I am convinced that, if this act of aggression took place, no Army and no Air Force which the Commonwealth of Australia could conceivably maintain could save her from invasion and defeat at the hands of the Japanese. The Dominion of New Zealand would be exposed to exactly the same danger and every word I have said about Australia is applicable to New Zealand". Hoare also told the South African and Canadian delegations that if Australia and New Zealand were conquered, they would be next as Hoare stated if Australia was turned into a Japanese colony, the Japanese would dominate the Indian Ocean and would then invade South Africa. Likewise, Hoare stated if the Japan dominated the Pacific Ocean, it would invade Canada. He concluded that the Singapore strategy was the key to maintaining the Commonwealth and that without it, all of the Dominions would be added to the Japanese empire.

=== Home Secretary ===
On Baldwin's retirement, the new Prime Minister, Neville Chamberlain, offered Hoare any office that he liked except the Exchequer, which Hoare would have liked but had been promised to Sir John Simon. Hoare chose the Home Office (28 May 1937). Hoare was still seen as a possible successor to Chamberlain. The French ambassador Charles Corbin stated in his reports to Paris that British politics in the late 1930s were dominated by a "big four" that consisted of Chamberlain, Lord Halifax, Sir John Simon and Hoare, whom he described as being the most powerful men in the cabinet and all of whom he clearly disliked. Hoare was widely viewed as being too ambitious to be prime minister one day and as a sycophant to Chamberlain. The future prime minister Harold Macmillan, then a rebellious backbencher, called Hoare "one of the worst and most sycophantic of Neville Chamberlain's advisers". Despite his position as Home Secretary, Chamberlain used Hoare as a minister for "general policy" as he served as of Chamberlain's most closest and trusted advisers. Much of Chamberlain's "personal diplomacy" towards Adolf Hitler was due to advice from Hoare that the Foreign Office was too "anti-German" to properly execute the prime minister's policies, and that Chamberlain should by-pass the Foreign Office as much as possible. Hoare later stated about Chamberlain's leadership: "If nines times out of ten he had his way, it was because it also the Cabinet's way". The "big four" of the Chamberlain cabinet were a part of a wider "inner group" in the Chamberlain government that also included Sir Horace Wilson, the Chief Industrial Adviser to the government and one of Chamberlain's closest friends; Rab Butler, the Parliamentary Under Secretary for Foreign Affairs; Sir Joseph Ball who ran the prime minister's press office; and Sir Warren Fisher, the Permanent Undersecretary of the Treasury.

Hoare had a long family interest in judicial and penal reform. The Quaker prison reformer Elizabeth Fry was his great-great aunt. RJQ Adams wrote highly of his time as Home Secretary, Roy Jenkins that Hoare was the most liberal Home Secretary between H. H. Asquith (1892–1895) and Rab Butler (1957–1962).

In 1938, Hoare was instrumental in obtaining approval for the British rescue effort on behalf of endangered Jewish children in Europe, which was known as the Kindertransport.

In September 1938, Hoare was part of the informal inner Cabinet, along with Simon and Halifax, and was one of the few consulted by Chamberlain about "Plan Z" to fly to meet Hitler for a summit meeting about Czechoslovakia, a decision that was then popular. Plan Z was a bold bid to solve the Sudetenland crisis under which Chamberlain was to fly to Germany for a summit intended to resolve the crisis once and for all, through Hoare did warn Chamberlain that "Plan Z" carried "great political risk". Hoare along with Simon, Halifax, Wilson and Alexander Cadogan were the only ones aware of "Plan Z" and the rest of the cabinet was not informed in advance nor were the French and Czechoslovak governments. Hoare's later account of the Munich Agreement was anguished. Hoare had close links to the Czechoslovak government. In retirement, he stood strongly by Chamberlain's essential judgements but regretted Chamberlain's lack of sensitivity in foreign affairs and his tendency for personal intervention that led to his failure to retain Eden and to override his Foreign Office advisers. However, Hoare repeatedly pointed out that public opinion was vociferously pacifist and that Chamberlain's actions were widely endorsed at the time, not least by US President Franklin Roosevelt. Also, the Labour opposition strongly opposed rearmament and the introduction of conscription, even after Munich.

In late October 1938, Hoare made an extended trip to the English countryside with Herbert von Dirksen, the German ambassador, for informal talks about an Anglo-German settlement. Hoare told Dirksen that he wanted an end to the arms race between Germany and Britain; another treaty to "humanise" aerial war that would ban the bombing of cities and the use of chemical weapons; a deal under which Britain would return the former German colonies in Africa in exchanges for promises of no war in Europe; and a British "guarantee" to protect Germany from the Soviet Union. The British historian D.C. Watt wrote: "This last is often cited by Soviet historians as proof of their thesis that the Cabinet was obsessed with the urge to provoke a German-Soviet war. Taken in its proper context, Hoare's ill-chosen remarks make it clear that the offer of a guarantee was intended to disarm any German arguments that Soviet strength in the air necessitated the maintenance of a large German Luftwaffe". The fact that Hoare's offer to Dirksen made no impression in Germany was to disillusion him, and led to Hoare taking a stronger line against Germany in 1939. In January 1939, Hoare urged an increase in defence spending and during the "Dutch War Scare" (a rumoured German attack on the Netherlands, possibly concocted by anti-Nazi elements in German intelligence) that same month advocated closer ties to France.

In spring 1939, Hoare aligned himself very firmly with Chamberlain's upbeat belief that war was now unlikely, rather than with Halifax's increasing focus on shoring up alliances and rearming for a conflict that to seemed imminent to Halifax.

These five men, working together in Europe and blessed in their efforts by the President of the United States of America, might make themselves eternal benefactors of the human race.

Samuel Hoare speaking of a possible future disarmament conference between Hitler, Mussolini, Edouard Daladier, Joseph Stalin and Chamberlain, March 1939

In a speech given on 10 March 1939 to his local Conservative constituency association in his seat in Chelsea, Hoare predicted a coming "golden age" as he foresaw a bright future full of peace and prosperity for all about to dawn. In the speech Hoare denounced those who called for greater rearmament as “jitterbugs”, commenting that “these timid panic-mongers are doing the greatest harm”. Just days after the "golden age" speech, Germany violated the Munich Agreement on 15 March 1939 by occupying the Czech half of Czecho-Slovakia, which became the Protectorate of Bohemia-Moravia. Hoare's "golden age" speech gave him the reputation as a someone with a blindly, almost Panglossian naïve faith in an optimistic future, and Dutton noted that next to Chamberlain's "peace in our time" speech of 1938, the "golden age" speech is one of the most mocked speeches in British history. Hoare had not actually wanted to deliver the "golden age" speech, which had been imposed on him by Chamberlain who complained that several of his ministers seemed reluctant to talk about foreign affairs.

In 1939, Hoare almost carried the most comprehensive Criminal Justice Reform Bill in British history: he had intended to abolish corporal punishment in prisons and had been keen to work towards the abolition of the death penalty of whose risks he was very aware. The Bill was cancelled because of the outbreak of war. Most of its provisions were successfully reintroduced by James Chuter Ede as Home Secretary in 1948, with support from Hoare, who by then was in the House of Lords.

During the Danzig crisis, Hoare spoke several times in the cabinet about the advantages of having the Soviet Union join a "peace front" meant to deter Germany from invading Poland. In cabinet debates Hoare along with Halifax, Chatfield (now serving as minister for the co-ordination of defence) and the War Secretary Leslie Hore-Belisha favoured broadening the "peace front" to include the Soviet Union as all expressed serious doubts about the ability of Poland to stand alone against Germany in opposition to Chamberlain and Simon. His change in stance from being opposed to any sort of co-operation with the Soviet Union to being an advocate of an alliance with the Soviet Union surprised many. Hoare's change in views was dictated by strategical considerations as the Chiefs of Staff stated that the Soviet Union was the only nation that could send forces directly to Romania and Poland (the two nations in Eastern Europe that most concerned British decision-makers in the Danzig crisis) and supply them with arms. In addition, the Chiefs of Staff stated that the submarines of the Soviet Baltic Fleet could cut the shipping lanes that linked Sweden to Germany and in this way supplied the Reich with the high-grade iron used to make steel in the blast furnaces of the Ruhr. The Chiefs of Staff argued that having the Soviet Union as an ally would deny Germany the use of its immense natural resources as the Soviet Union was self-sufficient in virtually all of the raw materials needed to sustain a modern industrial economy. Finally, the Chiefs of Staff predicted that the Soviet Union as an ally might deter Japan from aggression. The Chiefs of Staff predicted if war broke out in Europe, it was almost certain that Japan would try to take advantage of the conflict to seize Britain's Asian colonies and the Japanese would almost certainly invade Australia if they took Singapore. The Chiefs of Staff stated that Hong Kong was too exposed and was certain to be taken by the Japanese in the event of war, and furthermore predicted the Singapore strategy might be rendered inoperative by the Japanese capturing Singapore first before the British fleet could arrive. For all these reasons, the Chiefs of Staff argued that the Soviet Union would be an "invaluable" ally in helping to achieve the aims of British deterrence diplomacy in both Europe and Asia. Hoare seems to have been impressed by this argument that the Soviet Union would be a most helpful ally in both Europe and Asia, which inspired his volte-face. In March 1939, Hoare told the cabinet that he "held no predilections" in favour of the Soviet Union, but he argued that argued that the current policy of reaching out to the Soviets in a half-hearted manner was self-defeating as it was bound to excite the suspicions of Joseph Stalin. He stated on the basis of information from the British embassy in Moscow that Stalin was moody, sullen and paranoid and was bound to see British policy in the worse possible light. He argued that the main concern at present should be to prevent "Stalin from throwing the weight of Russian power onto the enemy's side". Hoare pumped energy into the Air Raid Precautions Department and the Women's Voluntary Service Organisation.

== Second World War ==
On the outbreak of war, Hoare became Lord Privy Seal in the nine-man War Cabinet (3 September 1939), with a wide-ranging brief. On 5 April 1940, Hoare briefly returned to the Air Ministry, swapping places with Sir Kingsley Wood, and later that month came under fire during the Norway Debate which brought down the Chamberlain government. Then, the resignations of himself, Chamberlain and Sir John Simon were essential preconditions for Labour to join a coalition government. Hoare was one of the foremost Chamberlain loyalists and was shocked at the apparent disloyalty of others, such as Halifax.

Following Winston Churchill's appointment as Prime Minister on 10 May 1940, Hoare was dropped from the government altogether unlike Chamberlain, Halifax and even Simon. He still hoped in vain to be Viceroy of India. Of the "big four" of the Chamberlain government, Hoare was the only one excluded from the government that Churchill formed on 10 May 1940 as Chamberlain became the Lord President of the Council, Halifax continued as Foreign Secretary and Simon became the Lord Chancellor.

Alexander Cadogan saw Hoare as a potential quisling in 1940, but Leo Amery and Lord Beaverbrook thought highly of him. Another Foreign Office mandarin, Robert Vansittart, thought him prim and precise but not a resilient figure in political struggle. Hoare was named as one of the fifteen "Guilty Men" in the influential July 1940 book of the same name. Guilty Men inflicted another blow on Hoare's reputation, which still lasts to this day.

After a brief period of unemployment Hoare was sent as Ambassador to Spain, with his wife, Lady Maud Hoare. In that demanding and critical role he helped to arrange the return of thousands of Allied prisoners from Spanish gaols and successfully helped to dissuade Francisco Franco from formally joining the Axis. The decision to appoint Hoare as ambassador to Spain was widely seen as an insult, likened by Dutton to being "made a manager of a Siberian power station" (the demeaning job given to former Soviet leader Georgy Malenkov in the late 1950s). Cadogan thought that instead of being made ambassador to Spain Hoare should have been sent to a penal settlement.

Hoare disliked Franco and found him an inconsistent and unresponsive negotiator. (Hoare found Franco's Portuguese counterpart, António de Oliveira Salazar, much more productive to deal with.) His memoir of the period, Ambassador on Special Mission, is an insight into the day-to-day life of a demanding diplomatic job, his primary challenges being to dissuade Franco from his preferred alignment to the Axis powers and to prevent the Allies from reacting with in haste to repeated Spanish provocations. Hoare's memoir is not fully transparent about his deployment of an array of bluff, leaks, bribery and subterfuge to disrupt unfriendly elements in Franco's regime and the operations of the German embassy, but those methods were noted by his staff.

In June 1941, Spain, ostensibly remaining non-belligerent, was preparing to send a division of volunteers to fight on the side of Germany against the Soviet Union, the so-called "División Azul" Blue Division. On 24 June, a big demonstration of students was organised by the regime in support of the expedition. The demonstration ended in front of the Falange Party's headquarters, where Ramón Serrano Suñer was present and gave a speech. There was much anti-British sentiment in Spain, and some students went to the nearby British embassy and started throwing stones and to attack the embassy building. Hoare called Serrano Suñer on the telephone, and they had a heated exchange. Serrano Suñer asked him if he wanted him to send more police to protect the embassy to which Hoare famously responded, "Don't send more police, just send fewer students".

Hoare also helped to prevent Spanish interference with Operation Torch in November 1942.

On 14 July 1944, he was created Viscount Templewood (the name was that of Templewood, a country house at Sidestrand) of Chelsea in the County of Middlesex. With the issue of Spanish neutrality no longer in doubt, his ambassadorship ended in December 1944, and he returned to Britain.

== Later life ==
In the House of Lords, Viscount Templewood served on the Political Honours Scrutiny Committee from 1950 and chaired it from 1954. He gave energetic support to penal reform, the Criminal Justice Act 1948 and the abolition of capital punishment. Templewood was the only Conservative peer who advocated the abolition of the death penalty in the 1950s. He took up many company directorships. In 1948, volume one of Churchill's memoirs/History of World War Two, The Gathering Storm, was published. In The Gathering Storm, Churchill finished off the assault on Templewood's reputation that Guilty Men had begun, by portraying the interwar period as a struggle between good vs. evil, and the "appeasers" were portrayed as almost as malevolent as Adolf Hitler. Churchill made the claim that Second World War was the "unnecessary war" that would have been avoided if only he had been prime minister in the 1930s. Churchill indicted the appeasers such as Templewood on two counts. The first count was a moral one, namely that Hitler was a deeply "wicked" man and the appeasers were variously cowardly and/or stupid not to have realised this. The second count was a practical one that they failed to prepare the country for the coming war by not spending money on defence and making the necessary alliances. Churchill's immense popularity made The Gathering Storm a bestseller in 1948, and the indictment that Churchill presented is still widely accepted today.

Hoare was President of the Lawn Tennis Association (1932–56), an elder brother of Trinity House (1936–1950), Chancellor of the University of Reading (1937 until his death in 1959), Chairman of the Council of the Howard League for Penal Reform (1947–59), President of the Magistrates' Association (1947–52), President of the Air League of the British Empire (1953-1956), and President of the National Skating Association (1945–57).

Templewood published a number of books after the war, including Ambassador on Special Mission (1946) about his time in Spain, The Unbroken Thread (1949), a family memoir, The Shadow of the Gallows (1951) on capital punishment, and Nine Troubled Years (1954), a memoir of the 1930s. Dutton described Nine Troubled Years as a "reasonable apologia for Chamberlain and appeasement", through he noted Templewood had to work within the highly restrictive rules imposed by Maurice Hankey about what he could and could not write about concerning cabinet debates, which gave a highly misleading picture of what actually happened. Furthermore, Dutton noted that Templewood displayed much loyalty to the memory of Chamberlain even when he was allowed to mention debates in the cabinet. For example, Templewood was completely silent in Nine Troubled Years about his disagreements with Chamberlain about his preference in 1939 for having the Soviet Union serve as the eastern pivot of the proposed "peace front" instead of Poland as Chamberlain wanted. Dutton noted that had he mentioned this it might had done something to dispel his image as Chamberlain's "yes man". Instead, Templewood just made a reference to an assessment by the Chiefs of Staff in 1939 that calculated the Polish Army was superior to the Red Army by a factor of three to one, which gave the impression that Chamberlain was quite rational in choosing Poland instead of the Soviet Union as the eastern pivot of the "peace front".

In addition to those awarded for his services in the First World War, he held the following foreign honours:

- Grand Cross of the Order of the White Lion of Czechoslovakia.
- Grand Cross of the Order of the Polar Star of Sweden.
- Grand Cross of the Order of the Dannebrog of Denmark.
- Grand Cross of the Order of Orange-Nassau of the Netherlands.

He died aged 79 of a heart attack, at his home, 12a Eaton Mansions, Chelsea, London, on 7 May 1959. He was buried at Sidestrand parish churchyard in Norfolk. As his marriage was childless, and his brother had pre-deceased him, the baronetcy and peerage became extinct upon his death.

Templewood's estate was valued for probate at £186,944 3s 6d (just over £4.5m at 2016 prices). His residence, Templewood House, in Frogshall, Northrepps, Norfolk, was inherited by his nephew, the architect Paul Edward Paget.

Hoare's widow Viscountess Templewood died in 1962.

== Arms ==
Coat of arms of Samuel Hoare, 1st Viscount Templewood
Crest In front of a stag's head erased Argent three crosses couped fesswise Sable. Escutcheon Sable an eagle displayed with two heads between three crosses couped within a bordure indented all Argent. Supporters (After viscountcy) On either side a stag Or charged on the neck with a cross couped Sable. Motto Venit Hora

== In media ==
In the 1981 TV serial Winston Churchill: The Wilderness Years, Hoare is portrayed by Edward Woodward.

Hoare, in his later role as Ambassador to Spain, appears in C.J. Sansom's WWII spy thriller Winter in Madrid.

The Apple TV streaming miniseries The New Look also depicts Hoare's time in Spain, featuring him meeting Coco Chanel during the latter's attempt to serve as an intermediary between Germany and the United Kingdom.

== Bibliography ==
- Adams, R. J. Q. (1993). British Politics and Foreign Policy in the Age of Appeasement, 1935–1939. Stanford University Press. ISBN 978-0-8047-2101-1.
- Alexander, Martin S. (1992). The Republic in Danger: General Maurice Gamelin and the Politics of French Defence, 1933–1940. New York: Cambridge University Press. ISBN 0-521-37234-8.
- Blake, Robert (1985). The Conservative Party From Peel To Thatcher. HarperCollins. ISBN 0-0068-6003-6.
- Braddick, H. B. (1962) "The Hoare-Laval Plan: A Study in International Politics" Review of Politics 24#3 (1962), pp. 342–364. in JSTOR
- Burdick, Charles B. (1968). Germany's Military strategy and Spain in World War II. Syracuse Univ. Press. ISBN 978-0-608-18105-9.
- Charmley, John (2011). "Neville Chamberlain and the Consequences of the Churchillian Hegemony". In Frank McDonough (ed.). Origins of the Second World War An International Perspective. London: Continuum. pp. 168–185.
- Coutts, Matthew Dean. (2011). "The Political Career of Sir Samuel Hoare during the National Government 1931–40" (PhD dissertation University of Leicester, 2011). online bibliography on pp 271–92.
- Cross, J. A. (1977). Sir Samuel Hoare: A Political Biography. London: Jonathan Cape. ISBN 0-224-01350-5.
- Dutton, David (2011). "Guilty Men? Three British Foreign Secretaries of the 1930s". In Frank McDonough (ed.). Origins of the Second World War An International Perspective. London: Continuum. pp. 144–167.
- Duroselle, Jean-Baptiste (2004). France and the Nazi threat : the collapse of French diplomacy 1932-1939. New York: Enigma Books. ISBN 1-929631-15-4. OCLC 55589798.
- Edwards, Jill (1979). The British Government and the Spanish Civil War, 1936–1939. London: Palgrave Macmillan. ISBN 9781349040032.
- Henig, Ruth (2011). "The League Of Nations: An Idea Before It's Time?". In Frank McDonough (ed.). Origins of the Second World War An International Perspective. London: Continuum. pp. 34–49.
- Holt, Andrew. "'No more Hoares to Paris': British foreign policymaking and the Abyssinian Crisis, 1935." Review of International Studies 37.3 (2011): 1383–1401.
- Ireland, Josh (2021). Churchill & Son. John Murray. ISBN 978-1529337754.
- Jago, Michael Rab Butler: The Best Prime Minister We Never Had?, Biteback Publishing 2015 ISBN 978-1849549202
- Jenkins, Roy (1999). The Chancellors. London: Papermac. ISBN 0333730585. (essay on Simon, pp365–92)
- Leitz, Cristian (1995). Economic Relations between Nazi Germany and Franco's Spain, 1936 – 1945. Oxford: Oxford Historical Monographs, Clarendon Press. ISBN 0-19-820645-3.
- Louis, William Roger (1983). "The Road To Singapore: British Imperialism in the Far East, 1932-1942". In Wolfgang Mommsen & Lothar Kettenacker (ed.). The Fascist Challenge and the Policy of Appleasement. London: George Unwin. pp. 352–389.
- McDonough, Frank (2011). "When Instinct Clouds Judgement: Neville Chamberlain and the Pursuit of Appeasement with Nazi Germany, 1937-1939". In Frank McDonough (ed.). Origins of the Second World War An International Perspective. London: Continuum. pp. 205–222.
- Matthew, Colin (2004). Dictionary of National Biography. Vol. 27. Oxford: Oxford University Press. ISBN 978-0198614111. (pp. 364–8), essay on Hoare written by R. J. Q. Adams.
- Moradiellos, Enrique (2011). "The International Dimensions of the Spanish Civil War". In Frank McDonough (ed.). Origins of the Second World War An International Perspective. London: Continuum. pp. 311–326.
- Neilson, Keith (2005). Britain, Soviet Russia and the Collapse of the Versailles Order, 1919–1939. Cambridge: Cambridge University Press. ISBN 9781139448864.
- Olson, Lynn (2007). Troublesome Young Men: The Rebels Who Brought Churchill to Power and Helped Save England. Farrar Straus & Giroux. ISBN 9780374179540.
- Roberts, Andrew, The Holy Fox The Life of Lord Halifax. London, 1991.
- Robertson, J. C. (1975) "The Hoare-Laval Plan", Journal of Contemporary History 10#3 (1975), pp. 433–464. in JSTOR
- Shaw, Louise (2013). The British Political Elite and the Soviet Union. London: Taylor & Francis. ISBN 9781135761264.
- Young, Robert (2011). "A Very English Channel: Britain and French Appeasement". In Frank McDonough (ed.). Origins of the Second World War An International Perspective. London: Continuum. pp. 238–261.
- Watt, D.C. (1989). How War Came. New York: Pantheon. ISBN 9780394579160.
- Wolpert, Stanley (2007). Shameful Flight The Last Years of the British Empire in India. Oxford: Oxford University Press. ISBN 9780199745043.

=== Primary sources ===
- Hoare, Sir Samuel (1925). A Flying Visit to the Middle East. Cambridge University Press.
- Hayes, Carlton J. H. (1945). Wartime Mission in Spain, 1942–1945. London: Macmillan. ISBN 9781121497245.
- Hoare, Viscount Templewood, Sir Samuel (1947). Complacent Dictator. A.A. Knopf. ASIN B0007F2ZVU.
- Hoare, Viscount Templewood, Sir Samuel (1954). Nine Troubled Years. London: Collins.
- Hoare, Viscount Templewood, Sir Samuel (1977) [1946]. Sedmay (ed.). Ambassador on Special Mission. Madrid: Collins.
- Butler, Rab (1971). The Art of the Possible. London: Hamish Hamilton. ISBN 978-0241020074.
- Lord Home (1976). The Way the Wind Blows: An Autobiography. Collins. ISBN 0 00 211997-8.

Parliament of the United Kingdom
Preceded by Emslie John Horniman	Member of Parliament for Chelsea; 1910–1944	Succeeded by William Sidney
Political offices
Preceded by Frederick Guest	Secretary of State for Air; 1922–1924	Succeeded by The Lord Thomson
Preceded by The Lord Thomson	Secretary of State for Air; 1924–1929	Succeeded by The Lord Thomson
Preceded by William Wedgwood Benn	Secretary of State for India; 1931–1935	Succeeded by The Marquess of Zetland
Preceded by Sir John Simon	Foreign Secretary; 1935	Succeeded by Anthony Eden
Preceded by The Viscount Monsell	First Lord of the Admiralty; 1936–1937	Succeeded by Duff Cooper
Preceded by Sir John Simon	Home Secretary; 1937–1939	Succeeded by Sir John Anderson
Preceded by Sir John Anderson	Lord Privy Seal; 1939–1940	Succeeded by Sir Kingsley Wood
Preceded by Sir Kingsley Wood	Secretary of State for Air; 1940	Succeeded by Sir Archibald Sinclair
Diplomatic posts
Preceded by Sir Henry Chilton	British ambassador to Spain; 1940–1944	Succeeded by Sir Victor Mallet
Baronetage of the United Kingdom
Preceded by Samuel Hoare	Baronet (of Sidestrand Hall); 1915–1959	Extinct
Peerage of the United Kingdom
New creation	Viscount Templewood; 1944–1959	Extinct
Academic offices
Preceded by Sir Austen Chamberlain	Chancellor of the University of Reading; 1937–1959	Succeeded by Lord Bridges
