= R. J. Q. Adams =

American historian and academic (born 1943)

Ralph James Quincy Adams
- Born: September 22, 1943 (age 82); Hammond, Indiana, U.S.
- Occupation: Historian
- Years active: 1972–present

Ralph James Quincy Adams (born September 22, 1943) is an American author and historian. He is professor of European and British history at Texas A&M University.

== Bibliography ==
- Arms and the Wizard: Lloyd George and the Ministry of Munitions, 1915–1916 (1978)
- The Conscription Controversy in Great Britain, 1900-18 (1987)
- Edwardian Conservatism (1988)
- The Great War, 1914-18: Essays on the Military, Political and Social History of the First World War (1990)
- British Politics and Foreign Policy in the Age of Appeasement, 1935-39 (1993)
- British Appeasement and the Origins of World War II (1994)
- Bonar Law (1999)
- Europe, Crisis and Conflict: 1890–1945 (2003)
- Balfour: The Last Grandee (2007)
- "Britain Responds: The Demise of 'Business as Usual'" in Relevance: The Quarterly Journal of the Great War Society (Autumn 1999)
- "Andrew Bonar Law and the Fall of the Asquith Coalition: The December 1916 Cabinet Crisis" in The Canadian Journal of History (September 1997)
- "Asquith's Choice: Herbert Henry Asquith, the May Coalition and the Conscription Crisis, 1915–1916" in Journal of British Studies, Vol. 25, No. 3 (July 1986), pp. 243–263.
