= Maud Hoare, Viscountess Templewood =

British noble (1882–1962)

Maud Hoare, Viscountess Templewood, DBE (née Lady Maud Lygon; 5 July 1882 – 27 December 1962), known as Lady Maud Hoare from 1909 to 1944, daughter of the 6th Earl Beauchamp, was the wife of Sir Samuel Hoare, and a DBE in her own right. She was a half-sister of the 7th Earl Beauchamp, a homosexual who became an exile having been denounced by his brother-in-law the Duke of Westminster.

She married the then Samuel Hoare on 17 October 1909, four years before he succeeded to his father's baronetcy. Their marriage was childless. The following is from Time dated 28 February 1927: "Sir Samuel Hoare, British Air Minister, and Lady Maud returned to London, last week, from a 12,000-mile round trip flight inaugurating the London-Cairo-Delhi air service (TIME, Jan. 10). For this feat she was appointed Dame Commander of the Order of the British Empire (DBE). She is the first woman ever to fly so many miles. There had been snow, rain, fog, sandstorms, but not a spare part was needed for the ship."

Lady Maud Hoare formally opened the newly expanded and improved London Croydon Airport on 2 May 1928, Britain's main international airport at the time. She also laid the foundation stone of the new RAF College at Cranwell in 1929.

== Death ==
Viscountess Templewood, as she became known after the creation of her husband's peerage in 1944, was widowed in 1959 and died in 1962 aged 80.
