= Anglo-German Naval Agreement =

Inter-war arms limitation agreement between the United Kingdom and Germany

Notes between His Majesty's Government in the United Kingdom and the German Government regarding the Limitation of Naval Armaments
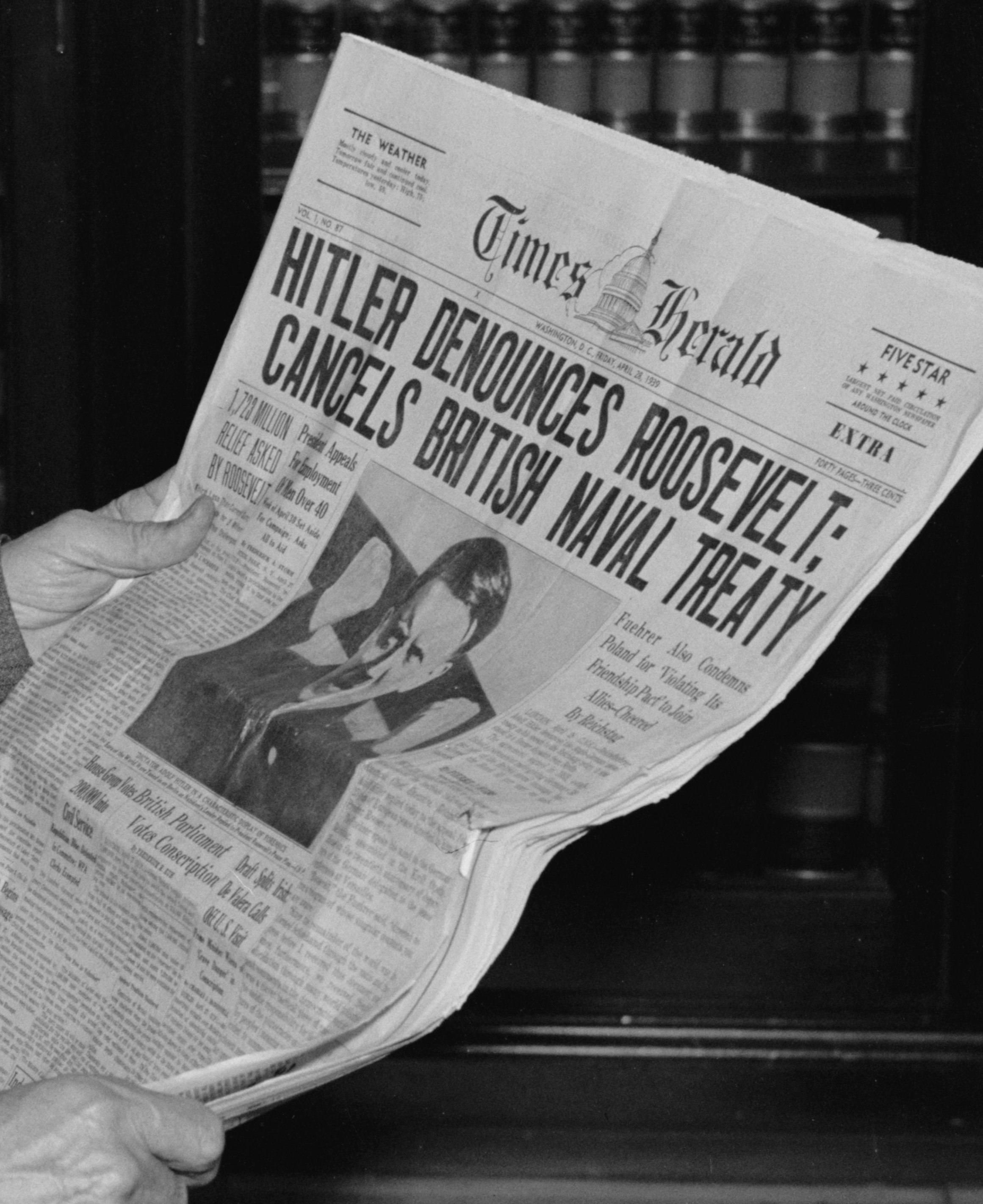
- Type: Naval limitation agreement
- Signed: 18 June 1935
- Location: London, United Kingdom
- Condition: Ratification by the Parliament of the United Kingdom and the German Reichstag.
- Parties: United Kingdom; Germany

The Anglo-German Naval Agreement (AGNA) of 18 June 1935 was a naval agreement between the United Kingdom and Germany that regulated the size of the Kriegsmarine in relation to the Royal Navy.

The Anglo-German Naval Agreement fixed a ratio whereby the total tonnage of the Kriegsmarine was to be 35% of the total tonnage of the Royal Navy on a permanent basis. It was registered in League of Nations Treaty Series on 12 July 1935. The agreement was abrogated by Adolf Hitler on 28 April 1939.

The Anglo-German Naval Agreement was an ambitious attempt on the part of both the British and the Germans to reach better relations, but it ultimately foundered because of conflicting expectations between the two countries. For Germany, the Anglo-German Naval Agreement was intended to mark the beginning of an Anglo-German alliance against France and the Soviet Union, whereas for Britain, the Anglo-German Naval Agreement was to be the beginning of a series of arms limitation agreements that were made to limit German expansionism. The Anglo-German Naval Agreement had been controversial ever since because the 35:100 tonnage ratio allowed Germany the right to build a navy beyond the limits set by the Treaty of Versailles and because London had made the agreement without consulting the French or Italian governments.

== Background ==
Part V of the 1919 Treaty of Versailles had imposed severe restrictions on the size and capacities of Germany's armed forces. Germany was allowed no submarines, no naval aviation, and only six obsolete pre-dreadnought battleships; the total naval forces allowed to the Germans were six armoured vessels of no more than 10,000 tons displacement, six light cruisers of no more than 6,000 tons displacement, twelve destroyers of no more than 800 tonnes displacement, and twelve torpedo boats.

Through the interwar years German opinion had protested these restrictions as harsh and unjust, and demanded that either all the other states of Europe disarm to German levels, or Germany be allowed to rearm to the level of all the other European states. In Britain, where after 1919 guilt was felt over what was seen as the excessively harsh terms of Versailles, the German claim to "equality" in armaments often met with considerable sympathy. More importantly, every German government of the Weimar Republic was implacably opposed to the terms of Versailles, and given that Germany was potentially Europe's strongest power, from the British perspective it made sense to revise Versailles in Germany's favour as the best way of preserving the peace; moreover, by allowing Germany some rearmament, Britain might win it to a position favorable to British interests, and, by offering a position better than Versailles but short of free rearmament, temper German militarism. The British attitude was well summarised in a Foreign Office memo from 1935 that stated "... from the earliest years following the war it was our policy to eliminate those parts of the Peace Settlement which, as practical people, we knew to be unstable and indefensible".

The change of regime in Germany in 1933 caused alarm in London, but there was considerable uncertainty regarding Hitler's long-term intentions. The Secretary to the Committee of Imperial Defence (CID), Sir Maurice Hankey, visited Germany in August 1933, and wrote a report of his impressions of the "New Germany" that October. His report concluded with the words:

"Are we still dealing with the Hitler of Mein Kampf, lulling his opponents to sleep with fair words to gain time to arm his people, and looking always to the day when he can throw off the mask and attack Poland? Or is it a new Hitler, who discovered the burden of responsible office, and wants to extricate himself, like many an earlier tyrant from the commitments of his irresponsible days? That is the riddle that has to be solved".

That uncertainty over Hitler's ultimate intentions in foreign policy was to colour much of the British policy towards Germany until the outbreak of World War II definitively resolved the question in favor of the former in 1939.

== London Naval Conference ==
Equally important as one of the origins of the agreement were the deep cuts made to the Royal Navy after the Washington Naval Conference of 1921–1922 and the London Naval Conference of 1930. The cuts imposed by the two conferences, combined with the effects of the Great Depression, caused the collapse of much of the British shipbuilding industry in the early 1930s. That seriously hindered efforts at British naval rearmament later in the decade, leading the British Admiralty to value treaties with quantitative and qualitative limitations on potential enemies as the best way of ensuring the Royal Navy's sea supremacy. Maiolo argues that it was actually of little importance whether potential enemies placed voluntary limitations on the size and the scale of their navies. In particular, Admiral Sir Ernle Chatfield, the First Sea Lord between 1933 and 1938, came to argue in favour of such treaties. They promised a standardised classification of different warships and discouraged technical innovations, which under existing conditions the Royal Navy could not always hope to match. Chatfield especially wished for the Germans to do away with their Deutschland-class Panzerschiffe (known in the London press as "pocket battleships"), as such ships, embracing the characteristics of both battleships and cruisers, were dangerous to his vision of a world of regulated warship types and designs. As part of the effort to do away with the Panzerschiffe, the British Admiralty stated in March 1932 and again in the spring of 1933 that Germany was entitled to "a moral right to some relaxation of the treaty [of Versailles]".

== World Disarmament Conference ==
In February 1932, the World Disarmament Conference opened in Geneva. Among the most hotly-debated issues at the conference was the German demand for Gleichberechtigung ("equality of armaments", that is, abolishing Part V of Versailles) as opposed to the French demand for sécurité ("security"), maintaining Part V as it was. The British attempted to play the "honest broker" and sought to seek a compromise between the French claim to sécurité and the German claim to Gleichberechtigung, which in practice meant backing the German claim to rearm beyond Part V, but not to a level that would allow it to present a real threat to France. Several of the British compromise proposals along those lines were rejected by both the French and the German delegations as unacceptable.

In September 1932, Germany walked out of the conference and claimed it was impossible to achieve Gleichberechtigung. By then, the electoral success of the Nazis had alarmed London, and it was felt unless the Weimar Republic could achieve some dramatic foreign policy success, Hitler might come to power. To lure the Germans back to Geneva, after several months of strong diplomatic pressure by London on Paris, all of the other delegations voted for a British-sponsored resolution in December 1932 that would allow for the "theoretical equality of rights in a system which would provide security for all nations". Germany agreed to return to the conference. Thus, before Hitler had become chancellor, it had been accepted that Germany could rearm beyond the limits set by Versailles, but the precise extent of German rearmament was still open to negotiation.

== Adolf Hitler ==
During the 1920s, Hitler's thinking on foreign policy went through a dramatic change. At the beginning of his political career, Hitler was hostile to Britain and considered it an enemy of the Reich. However, after the British opposed the French occupation of the Ruhr in 1923, he came to rank Britain as a potential ally. In Mein Kampf and even more in its sequel, Zweites Buch, Hitler strongly criticised the pre-1914 German government for embarking on a naval and colonial challenge to the British Empire and in Hitler's view, needlessly antagonising Britain. In Hitler's view, Britain was a fellow "Aryan" power, whose friendship could be won by a German "renunciation" of naval and colonial ambitions against Britain. In return for such a "renunciation", Hitler expected an Anglo-German alliance against France (Britain's centuries-old rival, but recent ally) and the Soviet Union and concomitant British support for the German efforts to acquire Lebensraum in Eastern Europe. As the first step towards the Anglo-German alliance, Hitler had written in Mein Kampf of his intention to seek a "sea pact", by which Germany would "renounce" any naval challenge against Britain.

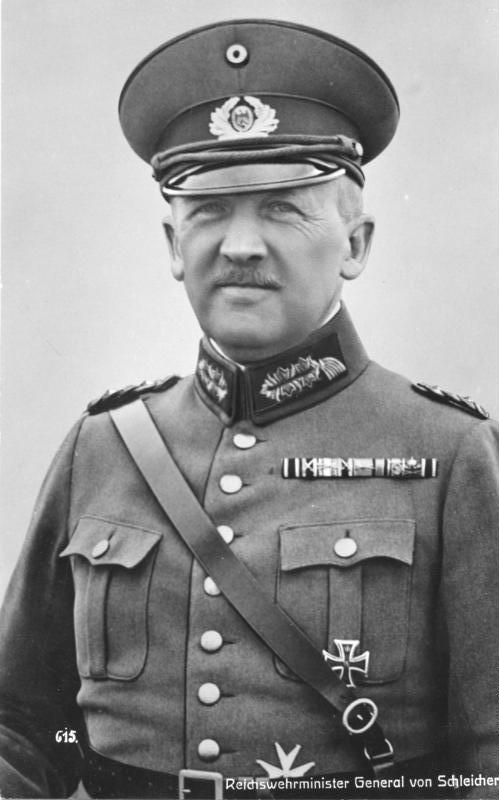
Kurt von Schleicher in uniform, 1932

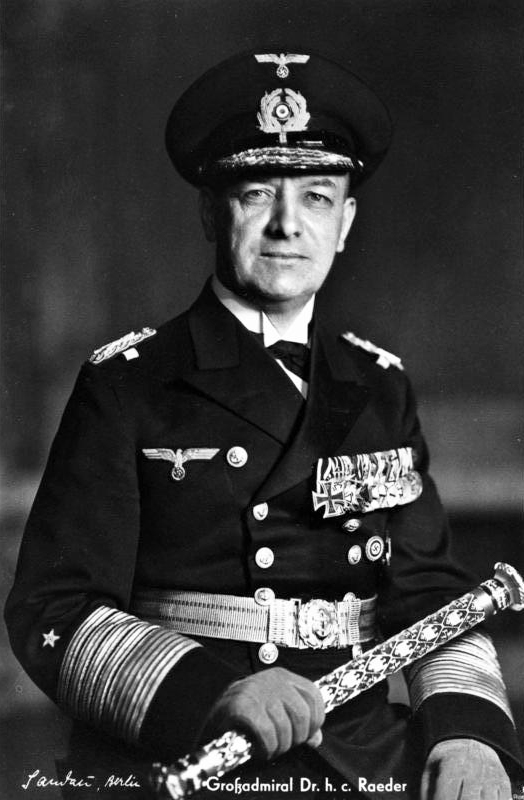
Erich Raeder in naval uniform, 1939

In January 1933, Hitler became German chancellor. He had inherited a relatively strong negotiating position at Geneva from Schleicher's government. The German strategy was to make idealistic offers of limited rearmament out of the expectation that all such offers would be rejected by the French, which would allow Germany to go on ultimately with the maximum rearmament, regardless of Paris' thoughts. The ultranationalism of the Nazi regime had alarmed the French, who put the most minimal possible construction on German demands for "theoretical equality" in armaments and thereby played into the German strategy. In October 1933, the Germans again walked out of the conference and stated that everyone else should either disarm to the Versailles level or allow Germany to rearm beyond Versailles.

Though the Germans never had any serious interest in accepting any of the various compromise proposals of the British, in London, the German walk-out was widely, if erroneously, blamed on French "intransigence". The British government was left with the conviction that opportunities for arms limitation talks with the Germans should no longer be lost because of French "intransigence". Subsequent offers by the British to arrange for the German return to the World Disarmament Conference were sabotaged by the Germans, who put forward proposals that were meant to appeal to the British but to be unacceptable to the French. On 17 April 1934, the last such effort ended with French Foreign Minister Louis Barthou's rejection of the latest German offer as unacceptable in the so-called "Barthou note," which ended French participation in the Conference while declaring that France would look after its own security in whatever way was necessary. Meanwhile, Admiral Erich Raeder of the Reichsmarine persuaded Hitler of the advantages of ordering two more Panzerschiffe, and in 1933 advised the Chancellor that Germany would be best off by 1948 with a fleet of three aircraft carriers, 18 cruisers, eight Panzerschiffe, 48 destroyers and 74 U-boats. Raeder argued to Hitler that Germany needed naval parity with France as a prime goal, but Hitler from April 1933 onwards expressed a desire for a Reichsmarine of one-third of the total tonnage of the Royal Navy.

In November 1934, the Germans formally informed the British of their wish to reach a treaty under which the Reichsmarine would be allowed to grow until the size of 35% of the Royal Navy. The figure was raised because the phrase of a German goal of "one third of the Royal Navy except in cruisers, destroyers, and submarines" was rhetorically awkward. Raeder felt that the 35:100 ratio was too low, but was overruled by Hitler. Aware of the German desire to expand the Reichsmarine beyond Versailles, Admiral Ernle Chatfield repeatedly advised it would be best to reach a naval treaty with Germany so as to regulate the future size and scale of the German navy. The Admiralty described the idea of a 35:100 tonnage ratio between London and Berlin as "the highest that we could accept for any European power", but it advised the government that the earliest that Germany could build a navy to that size was 1942 and the Admiralty would prefer a smaller tonnage ratio than 35:100, but it was still acceptable. In December 1934, a study done by Captain Edward King, Director of the Royal Navy's Plans Division, suggested that the most dangerous form a future German Navy might take, from the British perspective, would be a Kreuzerkrieg (Cruiser war) fleet. Captain King argued that guerre-de-course German fleet of Panzerschiffe, cruisers, and U-boats operating in task forces would be dangerous for the Royal Navy, and that a German "balanced fleet" that would be a mirror image of the Royal Navy would be the least dangerous form the German Navy could take. A German "balanced fleet" would have proportionally the same number of battleships, cruisers, destroyers, etc. that the British fleet possessed, and from the British point of view, that would be in the event of war, the easiest German fleet to defeat.

== U-boat construction ==
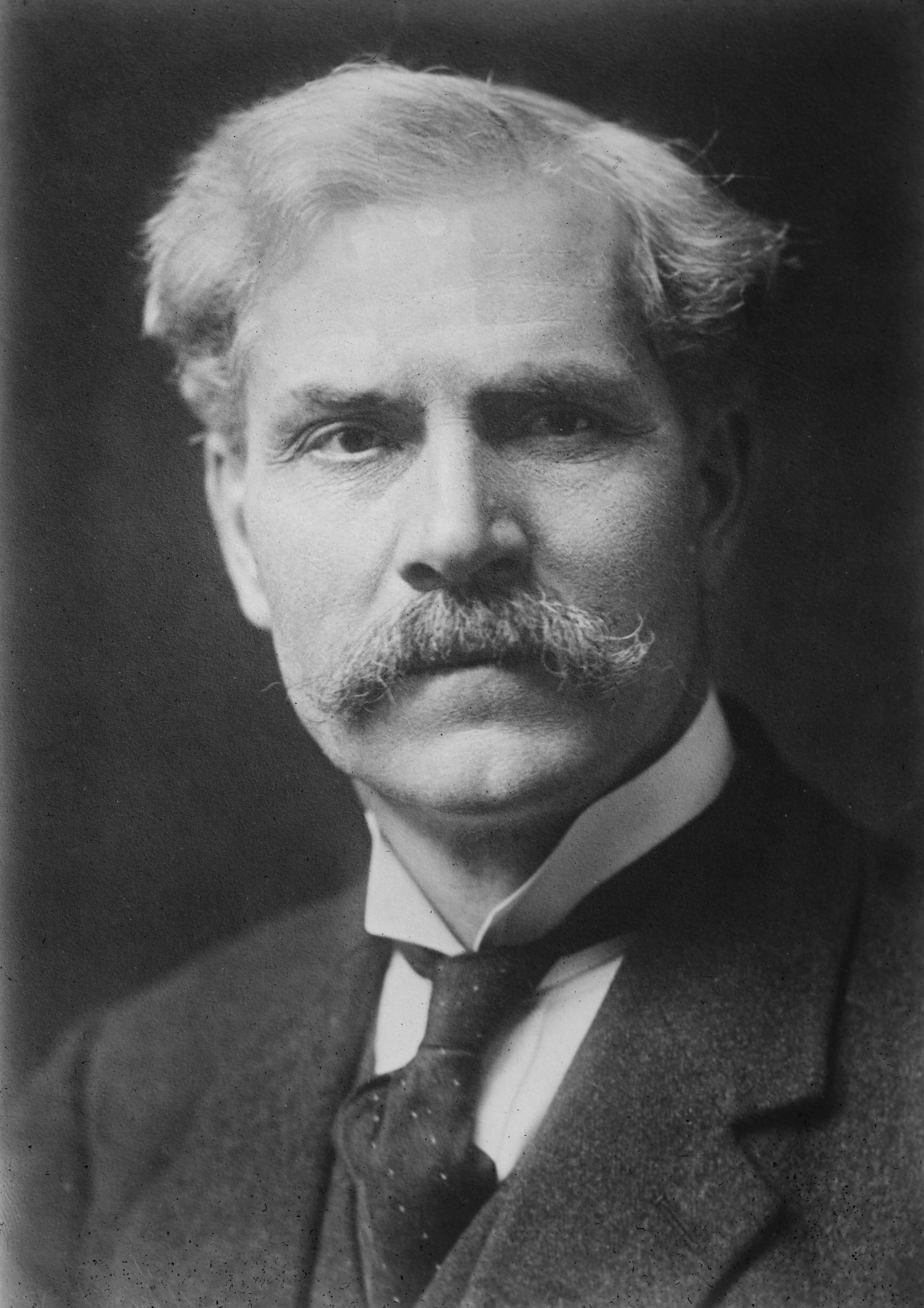
Ramsay MacDonald, Prime Minister of the United Kingdom 1924, 1929–1931 and 1931–1935.

Every Weimar cabinet had violated Part V of Versailles to some degree, but from 1933, the Nazi government began to do so more openly and vigorously. That year, the Germans started to build their first U-boats since World War I; they were launched in April 1935. On 25 April 1935, the British naval attaché to Germany, Captain Gerard Muirhead-Gould, was officially informed by Captain Leopold Bürkner of the Reichsmarine that Germany had laid down twelve 250 ton U-boats at Kiel. On 29 April 1935, British Foreign Secretary Sir John Simon informed the British House of Commons that Germany was now building U-boats. On 2 May 1935, Prime Minister Ramsay MacDonald told the House of Commons of his government's intention to reach a naval pact to regulate the future growth of the German Navy.

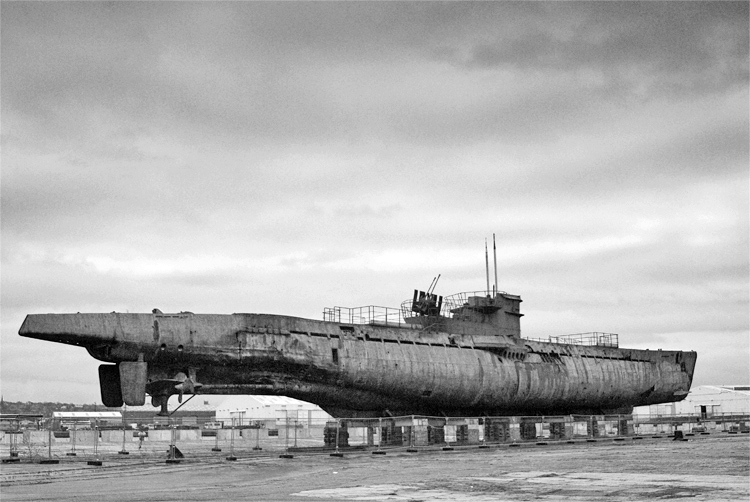
U-534, Birkenhead Docks, Merseyside, England

In a more general sense, because of Britain's support of German "theoretical equality" at the World Disarmament Conference, London was in a weak position to oppose Germany. The German response to British complaints about violations of Part V were that they were merely unilaterally exercising rights that the British delegation at Geneva had been prepared to concede to the Reich. In March 1934, a British Foreign Office memo stated, "Part V of the Treaty of Versailles... is, for practical purposes, dead, and it would become a putrefying corpse which, if left unburied, would soon poison the political atmosphere of Europe. Moreover, if there is to be a funeral, it is clearly better to arrange it while Hitler is still in a mood to pay the undertakers for their services".

In December 1934, a secret Cabinet committee met to discuss the situation caused by German rearmament. British Foreign Secretary Sir John Simon stated at one of the committee's meetings, "If the alternative to legalizing German rearmament was to prevent it, there would be everything to be said, for not legalizing it". However, since London had already rejected the idea of a war to end German rearmament, the British government chose a diplomatic strategy that would allow abolition of Part V in exchange for German return to both the League of Nations and the World Disarmament Conference. At the same meeting, Simon stated, "Germany would prefer, it appears, to be 'made an honest woman'; but if she is left too long to indulge in illegitimate practices and to find by experience that she does not suffer for it, this laudable ambition may wear off". In January 1935, Simon wrote to George V, "The practical choice is between a Germany which continues to rearm without any regulation or agreement and a Germany which, through getting a recognition of its rights and some modifications of the Peace Treaties enters into the comity of nations and contributes in this or other ways to European stability. As between these two courses, there can be no doubt which is the wiser". In February 1935, a summit in London between French Premier Pierre Laval and British Prime Minister Ramsay MacDonald led to an Anglo-French communiqué issued in London that proposed talks with the Germans on arms limitation, an air pact and security pacts for Eastern Europe and the nations along the Danube.

== Talks ==
In early March 1935, talks intended to discuss the scale and extent of German rearmament in Berlin between Hitler and Simon were postponed when Hitler took offence at a British government White Paper that justified a higher defence budget under the grounds that Germany was violating the Versailles Treaty, and Hitler claimed to have contracted a "cold". In the interval between his "recovering" and Simon's visit, the German government took the chance of formally rejecting all the clauses of Versailles relating to land and air disarmament. In the 1930s, the British government was obsessed with the idea of a German bombing attack destroying London and so placed a great deal of value on reaching an air pact outlawing bombing. The idea of a naval agreement was felt to be a useful stepping stone to an air pact. On 26 March 1935, during one of his meetings with Simon and his deputy, Anthony Eden, Hitler stated his intention to reject the naval disarmament section of Versailles but was prepared to discuss a treaty regulating the scale of German naval rearmament. On 21 May 1935, Hitler, in a speech in Berlin, formally offered to discuss a treaty offering a German Navy that was to operate forever on a 35:100 naval ratio. During his "peace speech" of 21 May, Hitler disavowed any intention of engaging in a pre-1914 style naval race with Britain, and he stated: "The German Reich government recognises of itself the overwhelming importance for existence and thereby the justification of dominance at sea to protect the British Empire, just as, on the other hand, we are determined to do everything necessary in protection of our own continental existence and freedom". For Hitler, his speech illustrated the quid pro quo of an Anglo-German alliance, the British acceptance of German mastery of Continental Europe in exchange for German acceptance of Britain's mastery over the seas.

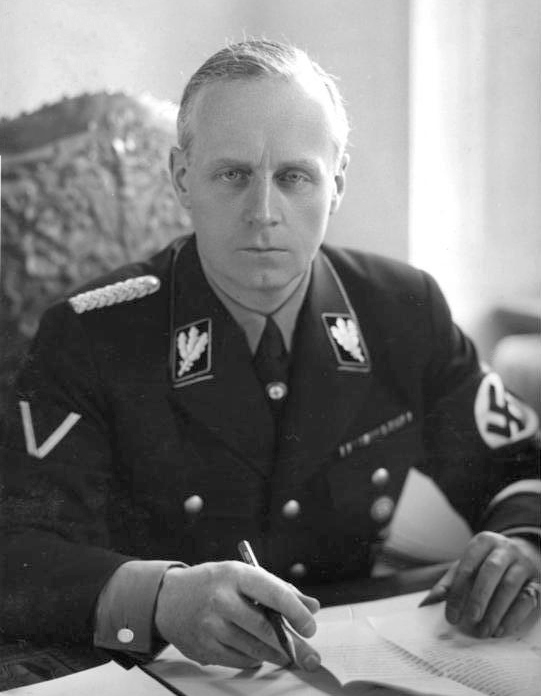
Joachim von Ribbentrop, the head of the German delegation sent to London to negotiate the Anglo-German Naval Agreement.

On 22 May 1935, the British Cabinet voted for formally taking up Hitler's offers of 21 May as soon as possible. Sir Eric Phipps, the British ambassador in Berlin, advised London that no chance at a naval agreement with Germany should be lost "owing to French shortsightedness". Chatfield informed the Cabinet that it was most unwise to "oppose [Hitler's] offer, but what the reactions of the French will be to it are more uncertain and its reaction on our own battleship replacement still more so".

On 27 March 1935, Hitler had appointed Joachim von Ribbentrop to head the German delegation to negotiate any naval treaty. Ribbentrop served as both Hitler's Extraordinary Ambassador–Plenipotentiary at Large (making part of the Auswärtiges Amt, the German Foreign Office) and as the chief of a Nazi Party organization, the Dienststelle Ribbentrop, which competed with the Auswärtiges Amt. German Foreign Minister Baron Konstantin von Neurath was at first opposed to the arrangement but changed his mind when he decided that the British would never accept the 35:100 ratio and so having Ribbentrop head the mission was the best way to discredit his rival.

On 2 June 1935, Ribbentrop arrived in London. The talks began on Tuesday, 4 June 1935, at the Admiralty office, with Ribbentrop heading the German delegation and Simon the British delegation. Ribbentrop, who was determined to succeed at his mission at any cost, began his talks by stating the British could accept the 35:100 ratio as "fixed and unalterable" by the weekend, or the German delegation would go home in which case the Germans would build their navy up to any size that they wished. Simon was visibly angry with Ribbentrop's behaviour: "It is not usual to make such conditions at the beginning of negotiations". Simon walked out of the talks.

On 5 June 1935, a change of opinion came over the British delegation. In a report to the British Cabinet, it was "definitely of the opinion that, in our own interest, we should accept this offer of Herr Hitler's while it is still open.... If we now refuse to accept the offer for the purposes of these discussions, Herr Hitler will withdraw the offer and Germany will seek to build to a higher level than 35 per cent.... Having regard to past history and to Germany's known capacity to become a serious naval rival of this country, we may have cause to regret it if we fail to take this chance...". Also, on 5 June, during talks between Sir Robert Craigie, the British Foreign Office's naval expert and chief of the Foreign Office's American Department, and Ribbentrop's deputy, Admiral Karlgeorg Schuster, the Germans conceded that the 35:100 ratio would be expressed in ship tonnage, the Germans building their tonnage up to whatever the British tonnage was in various warship categories. In the afternoon of that same day, the British Cabinet voted to accept the 35:100 ratio, and Ribbentrop was informed of the Cabinet's acceptance in the evening.

During the next two weeks, talks continued in London on various technical issues, mostly relating to how the tonnage ratios would be calculated in the various warship categories. For example, when it came to submarines, the Kriegsmarine was allowed to have 45% as many submarines as the Royal Navy. However, under certain circumstances this could be increased to 100%. Ribbentrop was desperate for success and so agreed to almost all of the British demands. On 18 June 1935, the agreement was signed in London by Ribbentrop, and the new British Foreign Secretary, Sir Samuel Hoare. Hitler called 18 June 1935, the day of the signing, "the happiest day of his life", as he believed that it marked the beginning of an Anglo-German alliance.

== French reaction ==
The Naval Pact was signed in London on 18 June 1935 without the British government consulting with France and Italy or later informing them of the secret agreements, which stipulated that the Germans could build in certain categories more powerful warships than any of the three other major Western European nations then possessed. The French government regarded that as treachery and saw it as a further appeasement of Hitler, whose appetite grew on concessions. Also, it resented that the British agreement had for private gain further weakened the peace treaty, which added to Germany's growing overall military power. France contended that the British had no legal right to absolve Germany from respecting the naval clauses of the Versailles Treaty.

As an additional insult for France, the Naval Pact was signed on the 120th anniversary of the Battle of Waterloo, in which Prussian and British-led troops defeated the French under Napoleon.

== Impact ==
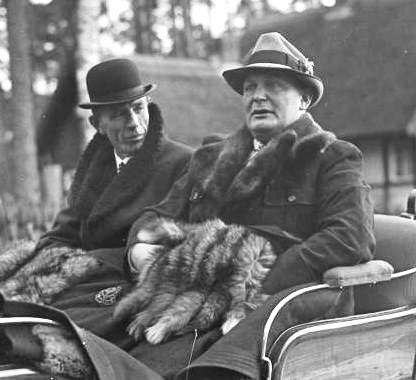
Lord Halifax with Hermann Göring at Schorfheide, Germany, 20 November 1937.

Because of the lengthy period needed to construct warships and the short duration of the agreement, its impact was limited. It was estimated by both German and British naval experts that the earliest year that Germany could reach the 35% limit was 1942. In practice, the lack of shipbuilding space, design problems, shortages of skilled workers and the scarcity of foreign exchange to purchase necessary raw materials slowed the rebuilding of the German Navy. A lack of steel and non-ferrous metals caused by the Kriegsmarine being third in terms of German rearmament priorities, behind the Heer and the Luftwaffe, led to the Kriegsmarine (as the German Navy had been renamed in 1935) being still far from the 35% limit when Hitler denounced the agreement in 1939.

The requirement for the Kriegsmarine to divide its 35% tonnage ratio by warship categories had the effect of forcing the Germans to build a symmetrical "balanced fleet" shipbuilding program that reflected the British priorities. Since the Royal Navy's leadership thought that the "balanced fleet" would be the easiest German fleet to defeat and a German guerre-de-course fleet the most dangerous, the agreement brought the British considerable strategic benefits. Above all, since the Royal Navy did not build "pocket battleships", Chatfield valued the end of the Panzerschiff building.

When the Kriegsmarine began planning for a war against Britain in May 1938, the Kriegsmarine's senior operations officer, Commander Hellmuth Heye, concluded the best strategy for the Kriegsmarine was a Kreuzerkrieg fleet of U-boats, light cruisers and Panzerschiff operating in tandem. He was critical of the existing building priorities dictated by the agreement since there was no realistic possibility of a German "balanced fleet" defeating the Royal Navy. In response, senior German naval officers started to advocate a switch to a Kreuzerkrieg type fleet, which would pursue a guerre-de-course strategy of attacking the British Merchant Marine, but they were overruled by Hitler, who insisted on the prestige of Germany building a "balanced fleet". Such a fleet would attempt a Mahanian strategy of winning maritime supremacy by a decisive battle with the Royal Navy in the North Sea. Historians such as Joseph Maiolo, Geoffrey Till and the authors of the Kriegsmarine Official History have agreed with Chatfield's contention that a Kreuzerkrieg fleet offered Germany the best chance for damaging Britain's power and that the British benefited strategically by ensuring that such a fleet was not built in the 1930s.

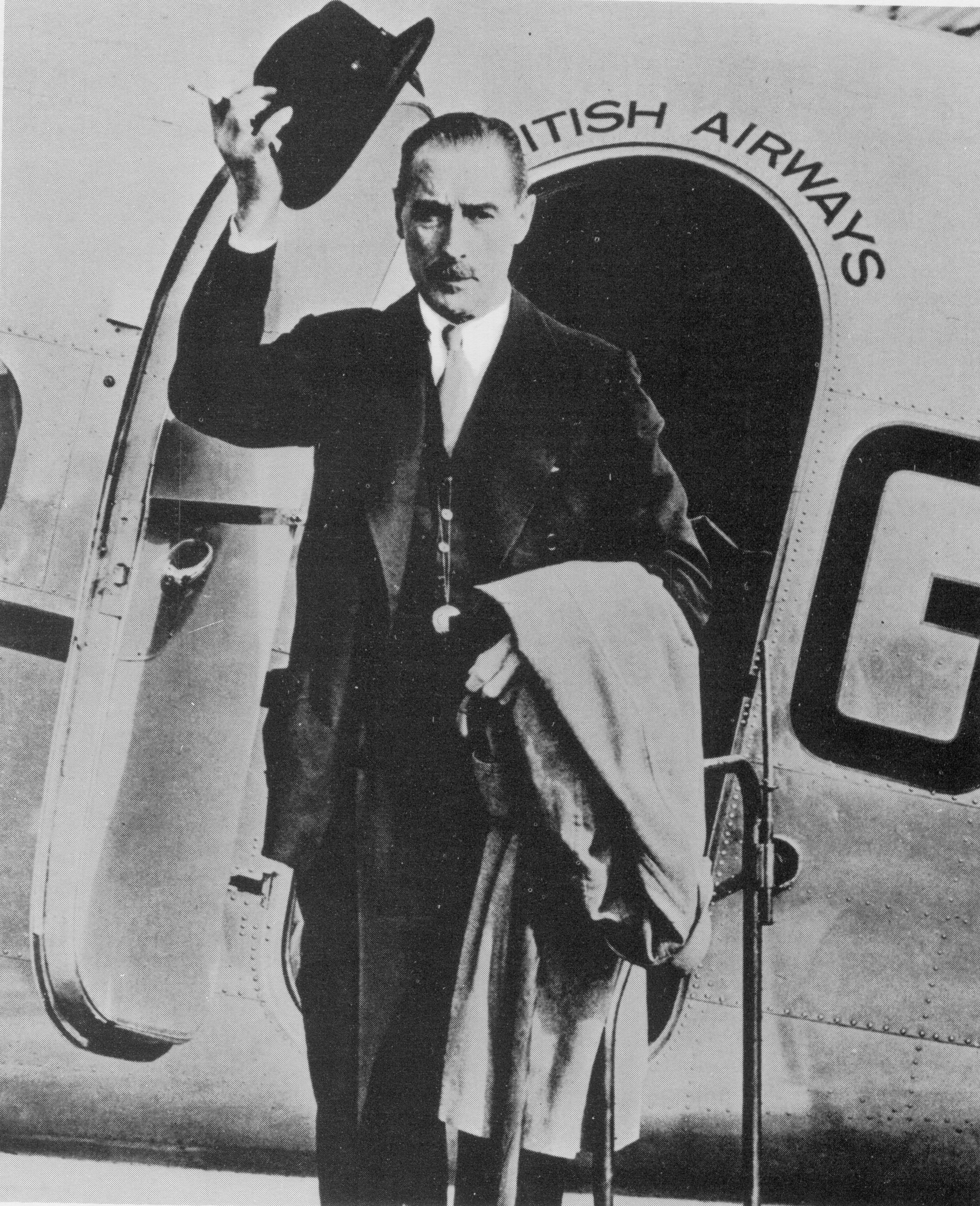
Nevile Henderson leaves for Berlin, Croydon Airport, August 1939

In the field of Anglo-German relations, the agreement had considerable importance. The British expressed hope, as Craigie informed Ribbentrop, that it "was designed to facilitate further agreements within a wider framework and there was no further thought behind it". In addition, the British viewed it as a "yardstick" for measuring German intentions towards them. Hitler regarded it as marking the beginning of an Anglo-German alliance and was much annoyed when that did not result.

By 1937, Hitler started to increase both the sums of Reichsmark and raw materials to the Kriegsmarine and reflected the increasing conviction that if war came, the British would be an enemy, not an ally, of Germany. In December 1937, Hitler ordered the Kriegsmarine to start laying down six 16-inch gun battleships. At his meeting with British Foreign Secretary Lord Halifax in November 1937, Hitler stated that the agreement was the only item in the field of Anglo-German relations that had not been "wrecked".

By 1938, the only use the Germans had for the agreement was to threaten to renounce it as a way of pressuring London to accept Continental Europe as Germany's rightful sphere of influence. At a meeting on 16 April 1938 between Sir Nevile Henderson, the British ambassador to Germany, and Hermann Göring, the latter stated it had never been valued in England and that he bitterly regretted that Herr Hitler had ever consented to it at the time without getting anything in exchange. The agreement had been a mistake, but Germany was nevertheless not going to remain in a state of inferiority in this respect vis-à-vis a hostile Britain and would build up to a 100% basis.

In response to Göring's statement, a joint Admiralty-Foreign Office note was sent to Henderson to inform him that he should inform the Germans:

"Field Marshal Göring's threat that in certain circumstances Germany might, presumably after denouncing the Anglo-German Naval Agreement of 1935, proceed to build up to 100% of the British fleet is clearly bluff [emphasis in the original]. In view of the great existing disparities in the size of the two navies this threat could only be executed if British construction were to remain stationary over a considerable period of years whilst German tonnage was built up to it. This would not occur. Although Germany is doubtless capable of realizing the 35% figure by 1942 if she so desires, or even appreciably earlier, it seems unlikely (considering her difficulties in connection with raw material, foreign exchange and the necessity of giving priority to her vast rearmament on land and in the air, and considering our own big programme) that she would appreciably exceed that figure during the next few years. This is not to say we have not every interest in avoiding a denunciation of the Anglo-German Agreement of 1935, which would create a present state of uncertainty as to Germany's intentions and the ultimate threat of an attempt at parity with our Navy, which must be regarded as potentially dangerous given that Germany has been credited with a capacity for naval construction little inferior to our own. Indeed, so important is the Naval Agreement to His Majesty's Government that it is difficult to conceive that any general understanding between Great Britain and Germany, such as General Göring is believed to desire, would any longer be possible were the German Government to denounce the Naval Agreement. In fact, a reaffirmation of the latter in all probability have to figure as part of such a general understanding.

The German Navy was for Germany mainly an instrument for putting political pressure on Britain. Before the war, Germany would have been willing to cease or moderate its naval competition with Britain but only in return for a promise of its neutrality in any European conflict. Hitler attempted the same thing by different methods, but like other German politicians, he saw only one side of the picture. It is clear from his writings that he was enormously impressed with the part played by the prewar naval rivalry in creating bad relations between the two countries. Thus, he argued that the removal of that rivalry was all that was necessary to obtain good relations. By making a free gift of an absence of naval competition, he hoped that relations between the two countries would be so improved that Britain should not, in fact, find it necessary to interfere with Germany's continental policy.

He overlooked, like other German politicians, that Britain was bound to react not only against danger from any purely-naval rival but also against dominance of Europe by any aggressive military power, particularly if that power is in a position to threaten the Low Countries and the Channel Ports. British complaisance could never be purchased by trading one of the factors against the other, and any country that attempted so would be bound to create disappointment and disillusion, as Germany did.

== Munich Agreement and denunciation ==
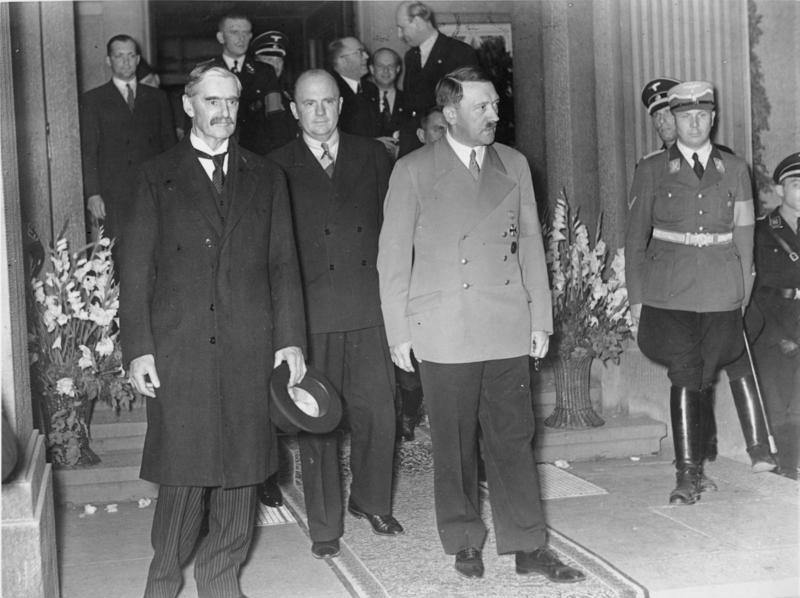
Chamberlain (left) and Hitler leave the Bad Godesberg meeting, 23 September 1938.

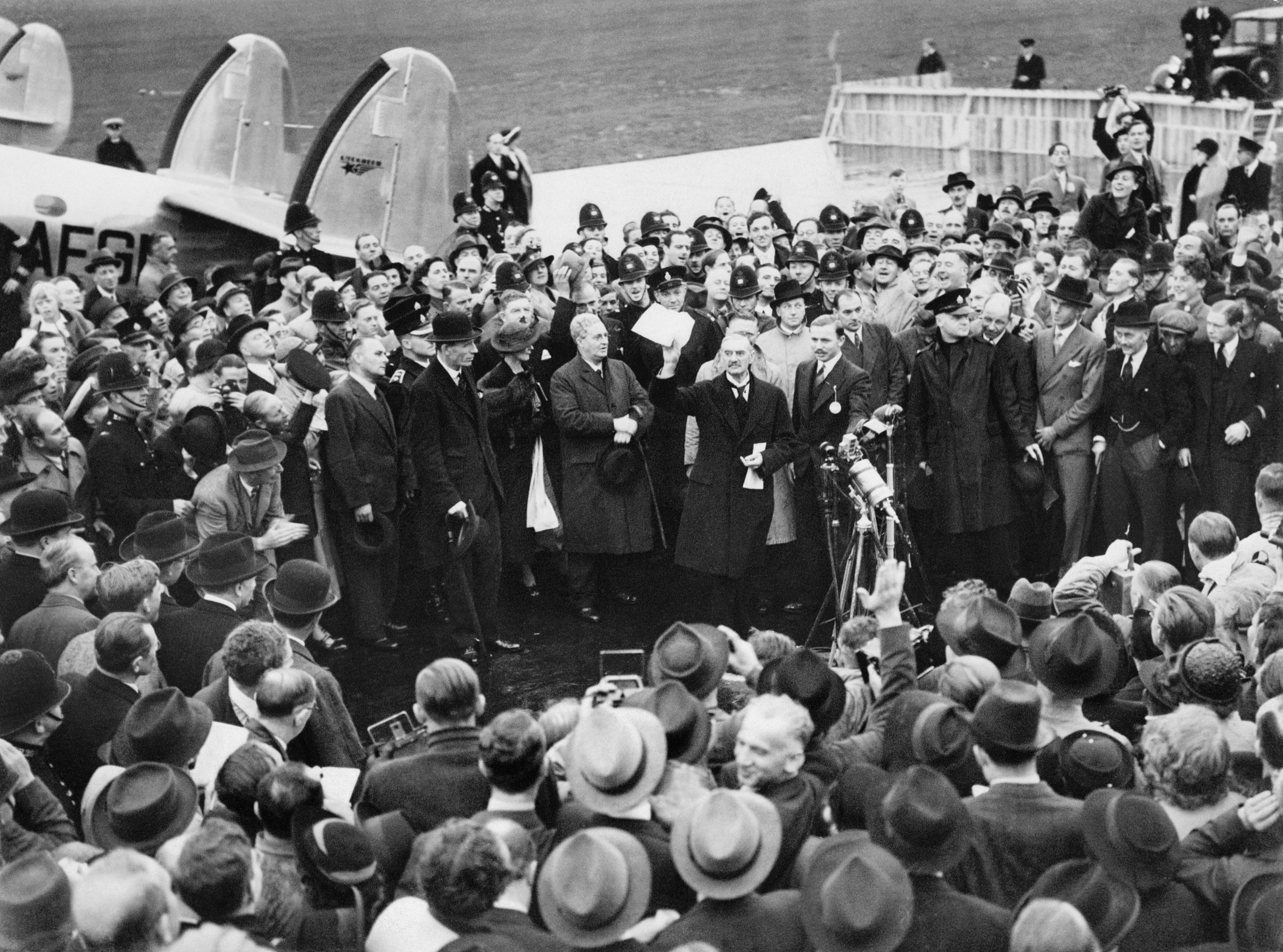
After the summit, British Prime Minister Neville Chamberlain returned home and declared that the Munich Agreement meant "peace for our time"

At the conference in Munich that led to the Munich Agreement in September 1938, Hitler informed Neville Chamberlain that if the British policy was "to make it clear in certain circumstances" that Britain might be intervening in a mainland European war, the political preconditions for the agreement no longer existed, and Germany should denounce it. That led to Chamberlain including mention of it in the Anglo-German Declaration of 30 September 1938.

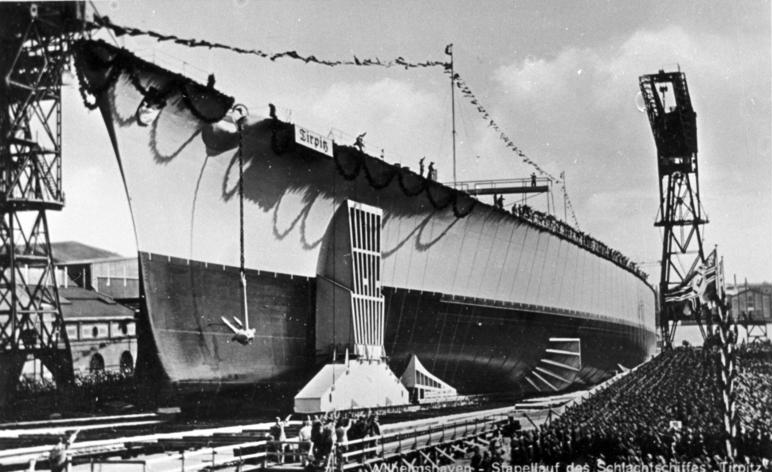
The battleship Tirpitz sliding down the slipway at her launch

By the late 1930s, Hitler's disillusionment with Britain led to German foreign policy taking an increasing-anti-British course. An important sign of Hitler's changed perceptions about Britain was his decision in January 1939 to give first priority to the Kriegsmarine in allocations of money, skilled workers and raw materials and to launch Plan Z to build a colossal Kriegsmarine of 10 battleships, 16 "pocket battleships", 8 aircraft carriers, 5 heavy cruisers, 36 light cruisers and 249 U-boats by 1944, which were purposed to crush the Royal Navy. Since the fleet envisioned in the Z Plan was considerably larger than allowed by the 35:100 ratio in the agreement, it was inevitable that Germany would renounce it. Over the winter of 1938–1939, it became clearer to London that the Germans no longer intended to abide by the agreement, which played a role in straining Anglo-German relations. Reports received in October 1938 that the Germans were considering denouncing the agreement were used by Halifax in Cabinet discussions for the need for a tougher policy with the Reich. The German statement of 9 December 1938 of intending to build to 100% ratio allowed in submarines by the agreement and to the limits in heavy cruisers led to a speech by Chamberlain before the correspondents of the German News Agency in London that warned of the "futility of ambition, if ambition leads to the desire for domination".

At the same time, Halifax informed Herbert von Dirksen, the German ambassador to Britain, that his government viewed the talks to discuss the details of the German building escalation as a test case for German sincerity. When the talks began in Berlin on 30 December 1938, the Germans took an obdurate approach, which led London to conclude that the Germans did not wish for the talks to succeed.

In response to the British "guarantee" of Poland of 31 March 1939, Hitler, enraged by the British move, proclaimed, "I shall brew them a devil's drink". In a speech in Wilhelmshaven for the launch of the battleship Tirpitz, Hitler threatened to denounce the agreement if Britain persisted with its "encirclement" policy, as was represented by the "guarantee" of Polish independence. On 28 April 1939, Hitler denounced the agreement. To provide an excuse for its denunciation of and to prevent the emergence of a new naval treaty, the Germans began refusing to share information about their shipbuilding, which left Britain with the choice of either accepting the unilateral German move or rejecting it and providing the Germans with the excuse to denounce it.

At a Cabinet meeting on 3 May 1939, the First Lord of the Admiralty, Lord Stanhope, stated that "at the present time Germany was building ships as fast as she could but that she would not be able to exceed the 35 per cent ratio before 1942 or 1943". Chatfield, now the Minister for Co-ordination of Defence, commented that Hitler had "persuaded himself" that the British had provided the Reich with a "free hand" in Eastern Europe in exchange for the agreement. Chamberlain stated that the British had never given such an understanding to Germany, and he commented that he first learned of Hitler's belief in such an implied bargain during his meeting with the Führer at the Berchtesgaden summit in September 1938. In a later paper to the Cabinet, Chatfield stated "that we might say that we now understood Herr Hitler had in 1935 thought that we had given him a free hand in Eastern and Central Europe in return for his acceptance of the 100:35 ratio, but that as we could not accept the correctness of this view it might be better that the 1935 arrangements should be abrogated".

In the end, the British reply to the German move was a diplomatic note strongly disputing the German claim that the British were attempting to "encircle" Germany with hostile alliances. The German denunciation and reports of increased German shipbuilding in June 1939 caused by the Z Plan played a significant part in persuading the Chamberlain government of the need to "contain" Germany by building a "Peace Front" of states in both Western and Eastern Europe and raised the perception in the Chamberlain government in 1939 that German policies were a threat to Britain.

== See also ==
- Appeasement
- Stresa front
- Events preceding World War II in Europe
- Plan Z
