= Chamberlain war ministry =

Government of the United Kingdom September 1939 – May 1940

- 1939–1940
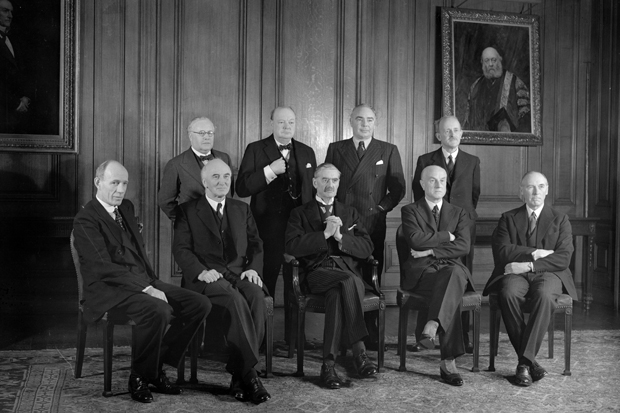
- Chamberlain's War Cabinet in September 1939.
- Date formed: 3 September 1939
- Date dissolved: 10 May 1940

People and organisations
- Monarch: George VI
- Prime Minister: Neville Chamberlain
- Prime Minister's history: 1937–1940
- Total no. of members: 98 appointments
- Member parties: Conservative Party; Liberal National Party; National Labour
- Status in legislature: Majority (coalition)
- Opposition party: Labour Party
- Opposition leader: Clement Attlee

History
- Legislature terms: 37th UK Parliament
- Outgoing formation: Norway Debate
- Predecessor: Fourth National Government
- Successor: Churchill war ministry

Neville Chamberlain formed the Chamberlain war ministry in 1939 after declaring war on Germany. Chamberlain led the country for the first eight months of the Second World War, until the Norway Debate in Parliament led Chamberlain to resign and Winston Churchill to form a new ministry.

== History ==
On 3 September 1939, Neville Chamberlain, Prime Minister of the United Kingdom, reconstructed his existing government so as to be suited for the Second World War. The most dramatic change to the ministerial line-up saw the return of Winston Churchill as First Lord of the Admiralty. Other changes included Lord Caldecote replacing Lord Maugham as Lord Chancellor, Sir John Anderson replacing Sir Samuel Hoare as Home Secretary (Hoare became Lord Privy Seal with a wide-ranging brief) and the return of Anthony Eden to the government as Secretary of State for Dominion Affairs. However, the administration was not a true national unity government as it was made up primarily of Conservatives with support from some National Labour and National Liberal members. There were no representatives from the Labour Party or Liberal Party.

The government was notable for having a small war cabinet consisting of only the principal and service ministers, with most other government positions serving outside the Cabinet. The War Cabinet included Chamberlain, Hoare, Chancellor of the Exchequer Sir John Simon, Foreign Secretary Lord Halifax, Churchill, Secretary of State for Air Sir Kingsley Wood, Minister for Coordination of Defence Lord Chatfield, Lord Hankey (as Minister without Portfolio), and Secretary of State for War Leslie Hore-Belisha. Oliver Stanley replaced Hore-Belisha in January 1940 while Chatfield left the war cabinet in April 1940.

The government ended on 10 May 1940 when Chamberlain resigned and was succeeded by Churchill who formed the War Coalition.

== Cabinet ==
=== War Cabinet, September 1939 – May 1940 ===
Upon the outbreak of the war, Chamberlain carried out a full-scale reconstruction of the government and introduced a small War Cabinet who were as follows:

- Neville Chamberlain – Prime Minister and Leader of the House of Commons
- Sir Samuel Hoare – Lord Privy Seal
- Sir John Simon – Chancellor of the Exchequer
- Lord Halifax – Secretary of State for Foreign Affairs
- Leslie Hore-Belisha – Secretary of State for War
- Sir Kingsley Wood – Secretary of State for Air
- Winston Churchill – First Lord of the Admiralty
- Lord Chatfield – Minister for Coordination of Defence
- Lord Hankey – Minister without Portfolio

==== Changes ====
- January 1940 – Oliver Stanley succeeds Leslie Hore-Belisha as Secretary of State for War.
- April 1940 – Hoare swaps Lord Privy Seal with Wood for Secretary of State for Air. Lord Chatfield leaves the government and the office of Minister for Coordination of Defence is abolished.

=== Key office holders not in the War Cabinet ===
- Thomas Inskip, 1st Viscount Caldecote – Lord Chancellor
- James Stanhope, 7th Earl Stanhope – Lord President of the Council and Leader of the House of Lords
- Sir John Anderson – Secretary of State for the Home Department
- Malcolm MacDonald – Secretary of State for the Colonies
- Anthony Eden – Secretary of State for Dominion Affairs
- Lawrence Dundas, 2nd Marquess of Zetland – Secretary of State for India and Burma
- John Colville – Secretary of State for Scotland
- Oliver Stanley – President of the Board of Trade
- Herbrand Sackville, 9th Earl De La Warr – President of the Board of Education
- Sir Reginald Dorman-Smith – Minister of Agriculture
- Ernest Brown – Minister of Labour and National Service
- Walter Elliot – Minister of Health
- Euan Wallace – Minister of Transport
- Leslie Burgin – Minister of Supply
- William Shepherd Morrison – Minister of Food and Chancellor of the Duchy of Lancaster
- Herwald Ramsbotham – First Commissioner of Works
- Hugh Macmillan, Baron Macmillan – Minister of Information
- Ronald Cross – Minister of Economic Warfare
- Sir Walter Womersley – Minister of Pensions
- George Tryon – Postmaster General
- Edward Turnour, 6th Earl Winterton – Paymaster General
- Sir Donald Somervell – Attorney General
- Sir Terence O'Connor – Solicitor General
- David Margesson – Chief Whip

==== Changes ====
- October 1939 – The position of Minister of Shipping is created, with Sir John Gilmour the first holder.
- November 1939 – Lord Winterton resigns as Paymaster General and no successor is appointed.
- January 1940 – Oliver Stanley becomes Secretary of State for War and a member of the War Cabinet in succession to Leslie Hore-Belisha (resigned) (see above) and is succeeded as President of the Board of Trade by Andrew Duncan. Lord Macmillan resigns as Minister of Information and is succeeded by Sir John Reith.
- April 1940 – Robert Hudson succeeds Sir John Gilmour (deceased) as Minister of Shipping. Lord De La Warr exchanges President of the Board of Education with Herwald Ramsbotham for First Commissioner of Works. William Shepherd Morrison swaps the Chancellor of the Duchy of Lancaster for the Postmaster General with George Tryon and is succeeded as Minister of Food by Lord Woolton.
- May 1940 – Sir Terence O'Connor dies and no new Solicitor General is appointed before the government falls.

== List of ministers ==
Members of the Cabinet are in bold face.

Office	Name	Party	Dates	Notes
Prime Minister; First Lord of the Treasury; Leader of the House of Commons	**Neville Chamberlain**	Conservative	3 September 1939 – 10 May 1940	Member of the War Cabinet
Lord Chancellor	**Thomas Inskip, 1st Viscount Caldecote**	Conservative	3 September 1939	
Lord President of the Council; Leader of the House of Lords	**James Stanhope, 7th Earl Stanhope**	Conservative	3 September 1939	
Lord Privy Seal	**Sir Samuel Hoare, 2nd Baronet**	Conservative	3 September 1939	Member of the War Cabinet
Lord Privy Seal	**Sir Kingsley Wood**	Conservative	3 April 1940	
Chancellor of the Exchequer	**Sir John Simon**	Liberal National	September 1939	Member of the War Cabinet
Parliamentary Secretary to the Treasury	David Margesson	Conservative	September 1939	
Financial Secretary to the Treasury	Harry Crookshank	Conservative	September 1939	
Lords of the Treasury	James Stuart	Conservative	September 1939 – 10 May 1940	
Lords of the Treasury	Thomas Dugdale	Conservative	September 1939 – 12 February 1940	
Lords of the Treasury	Patrick Munro	Conservative	September 1939 – 10 May 1940	
Lords of the Treasury	Stephen Furness	Liberal National	September 1939 – 10 May 1940	
Lords of the Treasury	Sir James Edmondson	Conservative	September 1939 – 13 November 1939	
Lords of the Treasury	Patrick Buchan-Hepburn	Conservative	13 November 1939 – 10 May 1940	
Lords of the Treasury	William Boulton	Conservative	12 February 1940 – 10 May 1940	
Secretary of State for Foreign Affairs	**Edward Wood, 1st Viscount Halifax**	Conservative	September 1939	Member of the War Cabinet
Parliamentary Under-Secretary of State for Foreign Affairs	R. A. Butler	Conservative	September 1939 – 10 May 1940	
Secretary of State for the Home Department	**Sir John Anderson**	National	3 September 1939	
Under-Secretary of State for the Home Department	Osbert Peake	Conservative	September 1939	
Parliamentary Secretary to the Ministry of Home Security	Alan Lennox-Boyd	Conservative	6 September 1939	
Parliamentary Secretary to the Ministry of Home Security	William Mabane	Liberal National	24 October 1939	
First Lord of the Admiralty	**Winston Churchill**	Conservative	3 September 1939	Member of the War Cabinet
Parliamentary and Financial Secretary to the Admiralty	Geoffrey Shakespeare	Liberal National	September 1939	
Parliamentary and Financial Secretary to the Admiralty	Sir Victor Warrender, 8th Baronet	Conservative	3 April 1940	
Civil Lord of the Admiralty	Sir Austin Hudson, 1st Baronet	Conservative	September 1939	
Minister of Agriculture and Fisheries	**Sir Reginald Dorman-Smith**	Conservative	September 1939	
Parliamentary Secretary to the Ministry of Agriculture and Fisheries	George Bowyer, 1st Baron Denham	Conservative	19 September 1939	
Secretary of State for Air	**Sir Kingsley Wood**	Conservative	September 1939	Member of the War Cabinet
Secretary of State for Air	**Sir Samuel Hoare, 2nd Baronet**	Conservative	3 April 1940	Member of the War Cabinet
Under-Secretary of State for Air	Harold Balfour	Conservative	September 1939	
Secretary of State for the Colonies	**Malcolm MacDonald**	National Labour	September 1939	
Under-Secretary of State for the Colonies	Basil Hamilton-Temple-Blackwood, 4th Marquess of Dufferin and Ava	Conservative	September 1939	
Minister for Coordination of Defence	**Ernle Chatfield, 1st Baron Chatfield**	Independent	September 1939	Member of the War Cabinet until 3 April 1940; Office abolished 3 April 1940
Secretary of State for Dominion Affairs	**Anthony Eden**	Conservative	3 September 1939	
Under-Secretary of State for Dominion Affairs	Edward Cavendish, 10th Duke of Devonshire	Conservative	September 1939	
Minister for Economic Warfare	Ronald Cross	Conservative	3 September 1939	
President of the Board of Education	**Herbrand Sackville, 9th Earl De La Warr**	National Labour	September 1939	
President of the Board of Education	**Herwald Ramsbotham**	Conservative	3 April 1940	
Parliamentary Secretary to the Board of Education	Kenneth Lindsay	National Labour	September 1939	
Minister of Food	**William Morrison**	Conservative	4 September 1939	Combined with the Duchy of Lancaster
Minister of Food	**Frederick Marquis, 1st Baron Woolton**	Conservative	3 April 1940	
Parliamentary Secretary to the Ministry of Food	Alan Lennox-Boyd	Conservative	11 October 1939	
Minister of Health	**Walter Elliot**	Conservative	September 1939	
Parliamentary Secretary to the Ministry of Health	Florence Horsbrugh	Conservative	September 1939	
Secretary of State for India and Burma	**Lawrence Dundas, 2nd Marquess of Zetland**	Conservative	September 1939	
Under-Secretary of State for India and Burma	Sir Hugh O'Neill	Ulster Unionist	11 September 1939	
Minister of Information	**Hugh Macmillan, Baron Macmillan**	Conservative Party	4 September 1939	
Minister of Information	**Sir John Reith**	National	5 January 1940	
Parliamentary Secretary to the Ministry of Information	Sir Edward Grigg	Conservative Party	19 September 1939	Office vacant 3 April 1940
Minister of Labour and National Service	**Ernest Brown**	Liberal National	3 September 1939	
Parliamentary Secretary to the Ministry of Labour and National Service	Ralph Assheton	Conservative Party	6 September 1939	
Chancellor of the Duchy of Lancaster	**William Morrison**	Conservative Party	September 1939	From 4 September 1939 – 3 April 1940 combined with Minister for Food
Chancellor of the Duchy of Lancaster	George Tryon	Conservative Party	3 April 1940	Lord Tryon
Paymaster General	Edward Turnour, 6th Earl Winterton	Conservative Party	September 1939	
Paymaster General	Vacant		November 1939	
Minister of Pensions	Sir Walter Womersley	Conservative Party	September 1939	
Minister without Portfolio	**Maurice Hankey, 1st Baron Hankey**	Independent	3 September 1939 – 10 May 1940	Member of the War Cabinet
Postmaster-General	George Tryon	Conservative Party	September 1939	
Postmaster-General	William Morrison	Conservative Party	3 April 1940	
Assistant Postmaster-General	William Mabane	Liberal National	September 1939	
Assistant Postmaster-General	Charles Waterhouse	Conservative Party	24 October 1939	
Secretary of State for Scotland	**John Colville**	Conservative Party	September 1939	
Under-Secretary of State for Scotland	John McEwen	Conservative Party	6 September 1939	
Minister of Shipping	**Sir John Gilmour, 2nd Baronet**	Conservative Party	13 October 1939	
Minister of Shipping	**Robert Hudson**	Conservative Party	3 April 1940	
Parliamentary Secretary to the Ministry of Shipping	Sir Arthur Salter	Conservative Party	13 November 1939	
Minister of Supply	**Leslie Burgin**	Liberal National	September 1939	
Parliamentary Secretary to the Ministry of Supply	John Llewellin	Conservative Party	September 1939	
President of the Board of Trade	**Oliver Stanley**	Conservative Party	September 1939	
President of the Board of Trade	**Sir Andrew Duncan**	National	5 January 1940	
Parliamentary Secretary to the Board of Trade	Gwilym Lloyd George	Independent Liberal	6 September 1939	
Secretary for Overseas Trade	Robert Hudson	Conservative Party	September 1939	
Secretary for Overseas Trade	Geoffrey Shakespeare	Liberal National	3 April 1940	
Secretary for Mines	Geoffrey Lloyd	Conservative Party	September 1939	
Minister of Transport	**Euan Wallace**	Conservative Party	September 1939	
Parliamentary Secretary to the Ministry of Transport	Robert Bernays	Liberal National	September 1939	
Secretary of State for War	**Leslie Hore-Belisha**	Liberal National	September 1939	Member of the War Cabinet
Secretary of State for War	**Oliver Stanley**	Conservative Party	5 January 1940	Member of the War Cabinet
Under-Secretary of State for War	John Lyttelton, 9th Viscount Cobham	Conservative	19 September 1939	
Financial Secretary to the War Office	Sir Victor Warrender, 8th Baronet	Conservative	September 1939	
Financial Secretary to the War Office	Sir Edward Grigg	Conservative	3 April 1940	
First Commissioner of Works	Herwald Ramsbotham	Conservative	September 1939	
First Commissioner of Works	Herbrand Sackville, 9th Earl De La Warr	National Labour	3 April 1940	
Attorney General	Sir Donald Somervell	Conservative	September 1939	
Solicitor General	Sir Terence O'Connor	Conservative	September 1939	
Lord Advocate	Thomas Cooper	Conservative	September 1939	
Solicitor General for Scotland	James Reid	Conservative	September 1939	
Treasurer of the Household	Charles Waterhouse	Conservative	September 1939	
Treasurer of the Household	Robert Grimston	Conservative	12 November 1939	
Comptroller of the Household	Charles Kerr	Liberal National	September 1939	
Vice-Chamberlain of the Household	Robert Grimston	Conservative	September 1939	
Vice-Chamberlain of the Household	Sir James Edmondson	Conservative	12 November 1939	
Captain of the Gentlemen-at-Arms	George Bingham, 5th Earl of Lucan	Conservative	September 1939	
Captain of the Yeomen of the Guard	Arthur Chichester, 4th Baron Templemore	Conservative	September 1939	
Lords-in-Waiting	Hugh Fortescue, 5th Earl Fortescue	Conservative	September 1939 – 10 May 1940	
Lords-in-Waiting	Frederick Smith, 2nd Earl of Birkenhead	Conservative	September 1939 – 10 May 1940	
Lords-in-Waiting	Rowland Hood, 3rd Viscount Bridport	Conservative	September 1939 – 10 May 1940	
Lords-in-Waiting	Robert Grosvenor, 5th Baron Ebury	Conservative	September 1939 – 10 May 1940	

== Source ==
- D. Butler and G. Butler, Twentieth Century British Political Facts 1900–2000.

Preceded by Fourth National Government	Government of the United Kingdom; 1939–1940	Succeeded by Churchill war ministry
