= Baron Chatfield =

Title in the Peerage of the United Kingdom

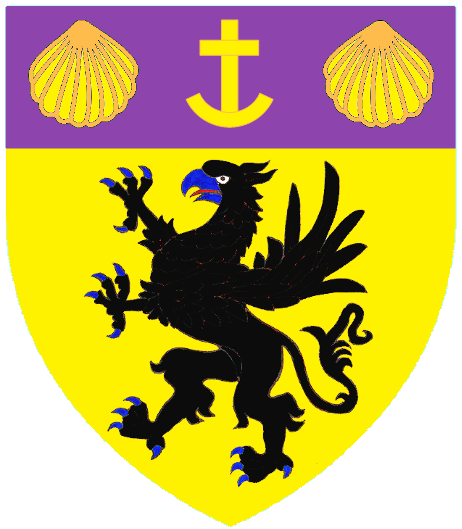
- Baron Chatfield Coat of Arms
- Creation date: 11 June 1937
- Created by: George VI
- Peerage: Peerage of the United Kingdom
- First holder: Ernle Chatfield, 1st Baron
- Last holder: Ernle David Lewis Chatfield, 2nd Baron
- Status: Extinct
- Extinction date: 30 September 2007
- Motto: Pro aris et focis, For hearth and home
- Arms: Or a griffin segreant Sable on a chief Purpure an anchor between escallops of the first.
- Crest: An heraldic antelope’s head erased Argent gorged with a naval crown Or.
- Supporters: On the dexter side an Admiralty Messenger holding in the exterior hand his staff and on the sinister side a gunner of the Royal Navy resting the exterior hand on a shell all Proper.

Baron Chatfield, of Ditchling in the County of Sussex, was a title in the Peerage of the United Kingdom. It was created in 1937 for the naval commander Sir Ernle Chatfield. The title became extinct on the death of his son, the second Baron, in 2007 in Victoria, British Columbia, Canada.

== Barons Chatfield (1937) ==
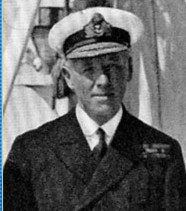
Lord Chatfield in 1938

- (Alfred) Ernle (Montacute) Chatfield, 1st Baron Chatfield (1873–1967)
- Ernle David Lewis Chatfield, 2nd Baron Chatfield (1917–2007)
