= Minister for Co-ordination of Defence =

British Government position (1936–40)

- Royal Arms of His Majesty's Government
- Cabinet Secretariat
- Type: Minister of the Crown
- Status: Abolished
- Member of: War Cabinet
- Reports to: Prime Minister
- Appointer: The Monarch on the advice of the Prime Minister
- Term length: At His Majesty's pleasure
- Formation: 13 March 1936
- First holder: Sir Thomas Inskip
- Final holder: Lord Chatfield
- Abolished: April 1940

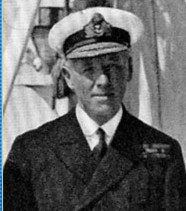
Lord Chatfield served as the second and final Minister for Co-ordination of Defence.

The Minister for Co-ordination of Defence was a British Cabinet-level position established in 1936 to oversee and co-ordinate the rearmament of Britain's defences. It was abolished in 1940.

== History ==
The position was established by Prime Minister Stanley Baldwin in response to criticism that Britain's armed forces were understrength compared to Nazi Germany. This campaign had been led by Winston Churchill, and many expected him to be appointed as the new minister, though nearly every other senior figure in the National Government was also speculated upon by politicians and commentators. Despite this, Baldwin's choice of the Attorney General Sir Thomas Inskip provoked widespread astonishment. A famous remark was "This is the most cynical appointment since Caligula made his horse a consul". The appointment is now regarded as a sign of caution by Baldwin, who did not wish to appoint someone like Churchill who would have been interpreted by foreign powers as a sign of the United Kingdom preparing for war, as well as a desire to avoid taking on board a controversial and radical minister.

In 1939 Inskip was succeeded by First Sea Lord Lord Chatfield. When the Second World War broke out, the new prime minister Neville Chamberlain formed a small War Cabinet, and it was expected that Chatfield would serve as a spokesperson for the three service ministers, the Secretary of State for War, the First Lord of the Admiralty and the Secretary of State for Air; however political considerations resulted in all three posts being included in the Cabinet, and Chatfield's role proved increasingly redundant. In April 1940 the position was formally wound up and the functions transferred to other Ministers.

The following month Chamberlain was succeeded as prime minister by Churchill, who took the additional title of "Minister of Defence"; this was, however, a separate office from Minister for Coordination of Defence, though the two titles were frequently used interchangeably.

Principal political leaders of the English/British Armed Forces:
	Royal Navy	British Army	Royal Air Force	Co-ordination
1628	First Lord of the Admiralty (1628–1964)			
1794	First Lord of the Admiralty (1628–1964)	Secretary of State for War (1794–1801)		
1801	First Lord of the Admiralty (1628–1964)	Secretary of State for War and the Colonies (1801–1854)		
1854	First Lord of the Admiralty (1628–1964)	Secretary of State for War (1854–1964)		
1919	First Lord of the Admiralty (1628–1964)	Secretary of State for War (1854–1964)	Secretary of State for Air (1919–1964)	
1936	First Lord of the Admiralty (1628–1964)	Secretary of State for War (1854–1964)	Secretary of State for Air (1919–1964)	Minister for Co-ordination of Defence (1936–1940)
1940	First Lord of the Admiralty (1628–1964)	Secretary of State for War (1854–1964)	Secretary of State for Air (1919–1964)	Minister of Defence (1940–1964)
1964	Secretary of State for Defence (1964–present)			

== Ministers for Co-ordination of Defence ==
Minister	Term of office		Party	Ministry
Thomas Inskip; MP for Fareham (1876–1947)	13 March 1936	29 January 1939	Conservative	Baldwin III
Thomas Inskip; MP for Fareham (1876–1947)	13 March 1936	29 January 1939	Conservative	Chamberlain I
Ernle Chatfield; 1st Baron Chatfield (1873–1967)	29 January 1939	3 April 1940	Independent (National)	Chamberlain I
Ernle Chatfield; 1st Baron Chatfield (1873–1967)	29 January 1939	3 April 1940	Independent (National)	Chamberlain War
