= Ernle Chatfield, 1st Baron Chatfield =

Royal Navy Admiral of the Fleet (1873–1967)

Admiral of the Fleet The Right Honourable The Lord Chatfield GCB OM KCMG CVO PC DL
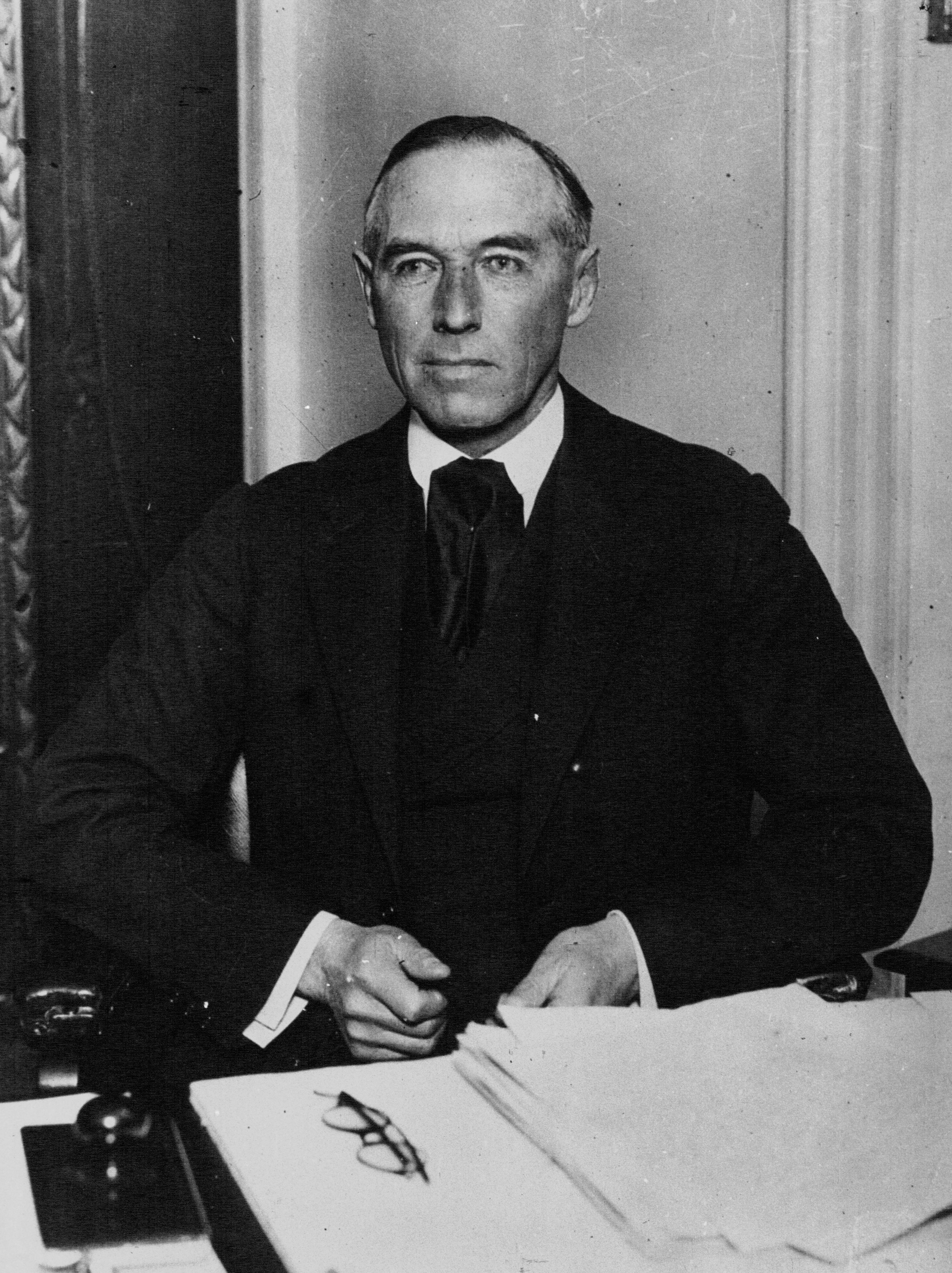
- Chatfield in 1933

Minister for Coordination of Defence
- In office 29 January 1939 – 10 May 1940
- Prime Minister: Neville Chamberlain
- Preceded by: Sir Thomas Inskip
- Succeeded by: Winston Churchill as Minister of Defence

Personal details
- Born: 27 September 1873 Southsea, Hampshire
- Died: 15 November 1967 (aged 94) Farnham Common, Buckinghamshire

Military service
- Allegiance: United Kingdom
- Branch/service: Royal Navy
- Years of service: 1886–1938
- Rank: Admiral of the Fleet
- Commands: First Sea Lord; Mediterranean Fleet; Atlantic Fleet; 3rd Light Cruiser Squadron; HMS Queen Elizabeth; HMS Iron Duke; HMS Lion; HMS Southampton; HMS Aboukir; RMS Medina; HMS London; HMS Albemarle
- Battles/wars: First World War
- Awards: Knight Grand Cross of the Order of the Bath; Member of the Order of Merit; Knight Commander of the Order of St Michael and St George; Commander of the Royal Victorian Order

Admiral of the Fleet Alfred Ernle Montacute Chatfield, 1st Baron Chatfield, GCB, OM, KCMG, CVO, PC, DL (27 September 1873 – 15 November 1967) was a Royal Navy officer. During the First World War he was present as Sir David Beatty's Flag-Captain at the Battle of Heligoland Bight in August 1914, at the Battle of Dogger Bank in January 1915 and at the Battle of Jutland in May 1916. After the war he became Commander-in-Chief, Atlantic Fleet and then Commander-in-Chief, Mediterranean Fleet before serving as First Sea Lord in the mid-1930s in which role he won arguments that the Royal Navy should have 70 cruisers rather than the 50 cruisers that had been agreed at the Naval Conference of 1930, that the battleship still had an important role to play despite the development of the bomber and that the Fleet Air Arm should be part of the Royal Navy rather than the Royal Air Force. He subsequently served as Minister for Coordination of Defence in the early years of the Second World War.

== Early naval career ==
Born the only son of Admiral Alfred John Chatfield and Louisa Chatfield (née Faulconer), Chatfield was educated at St Andrew's School in Tenby before he entered the Royal Navy as a cadet in the training ship HMS Britannia in 1886. He went to sea as a midshipman in the corvette HMS Cleopatra in November 1888 before transferring to the cruiser HMS Warspite, flagship of the Pacific Station, in 1890. Promoted to sub-lieutenant on 27 September 1892 and to lieutenant on 27 March 1894, he joined the battleship HMS Royal Sovereign, flagship of the Channel Fleet in May 1894. He attended the gunnery school HMS Excellent in 1895 and then joined the staff at the gunnery school HMS Cambridge at Devonport in August 1897. Chatfield became gunnery officer in the battleship HMS Caesar in the Mediterranean Fleet in January 1899 and then joined the staff of the gunnery school HMS Wildfire at Sheerness in January 1900 before becoming 1st lieutenant and gunnery officer in the cruiser HMS Good Hope in the Atlantic Fleet in November 1902. Promoted to commander on 1 January 1904, he transferred to the battleship HMS Venerable in the Mediterranean Fleet in January 1904.

He returned to HMS Excellent in March 1906 and, having been promoted to captain on 30 June 1909, he became Flag Captain of the battleship HMS Albemarle, flagship of Rear-Admiral Sir Colin Keppel, second-in-command of the Atlantic Fleet, in September 1909 and then Flag Captain of the battleship HMS London, Keppel's new flagship in the same role, in February 1910. After attending the War course at the Royal Naval War College at Portsmouth, he served as Captain of the converted liner RMS Medina for the Royal Tour of India in 1911 and was appointed to the Royal Victorian Order as a Commander in February 1912. He was then given command first of HMS Aboukir in the Reserve Fleet in Summer 1912, then of the cruiser HMS Southampton in September 1912 and subsequently of the battlecruiser HMS Lion, flagship of Rear-Admiral David Beatty's First Battlecruiser Squadron, in March 1913.

== First World War ==
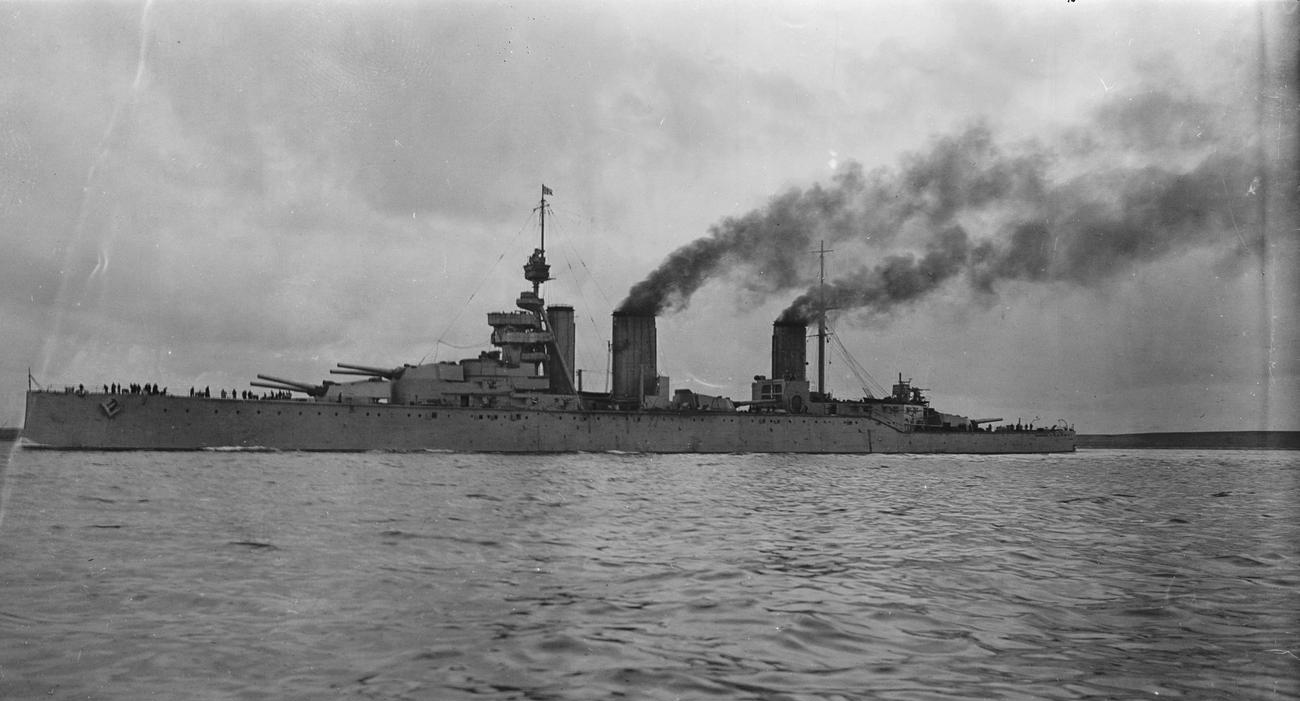
The battle cruiser HMS Lion, which Chatfield commanded at the Battle of Jutland

During the First World War Chatfield was present as Beatty's Flag-Captain in the Lion at the Battle of Heligoland Bight in August 1914, at the Battle of Dogger Bank in January 1915 and at the Battle of Jutland in May 1916. It was at Jutland, after two British battlecruisers had blown up, that Beatty made his famous remark, "There seems to be something wrong with our bloody ships today". Appointed to the Order of St Michael and St George as a Companion on 31 May 1916 and to the Order of the Bath as a Companion in the 1916 Birthday Honours, Chatfield went on to command the battleship HMS Iron Duke, Beatty's flagship as Commander-in-Chief of the Grand Fleet, in November 1916 and then the battleship HMS Queen Elizabeth, Beatty's new flagship in the same role, in February 1917. He was advanced to Knight Commander of the Order of St Michael and St George on 5 April 1919.

== Interwar ==
After the war Chatfield served as Fourth Sea Lord from July 1919 and, having been appointed Naval Aide-de-Camp to the King on 26 January 1920 and promoted to rear-admiral on 31 July 1920, he became Assistant Chief of the Naval Staff in February 1920. Chatfield attended the Washington naval conference in 1921-1922 that ended for the moment the mounting Anglo-American-Japanese naval arms race in the Asia-Pacific region. In private, Chatfield felt that the Foreign Secretary Arthur Balfour had given away too much in his talks with the Americans and the Japanese, but also felt the British "might well have done worse...We had successfully resisted efforts to limit our cruiser and destroyer numbers." Chatfield also noted that the Geddes Committee had already ruled in its report on 11 February 1922 that the Royal Navy was too expensive. The committee declared that some 35, 000 sailors were redundant and the naval budget should be cut by £21 million, which meant the Royal Navy was going to be reduced in size regardless of what the Washington conference had decided.

Advanced to Knight Commander of the Order of the Bath in the 1922 Birthday Honours, he was appointed Commander of the 3rd Light Cruiser Squadron in September 1922 and Third Sea Lord and Controller of the Navy in April 1925. As Third Sea Lord, Chatfield became keenly concerned about the British shipbuilding industry, which went into contraction as the Anglo-German naval arms race had ended and the Washington treaty imposed limits on shipbuilding. Equally worrisome to him was the increasing cost of warships owing to technological innovation, which led him to express concerns that the necessary political will to spend millions of pounds upon the Navy was being eroded.

Promoted to vice-admiral on 1 March 1926, he went on to be Commander-in-Chief, Atlantic Fleet, with his flag in the battleship HMS Nelson, in March 1929 and, having been promoted to full admiral on 1 April 1930, he became Commander-in-Chief, Mediterranean Fleet, with his flag in the battleship HMS Queen Elizabeth, in May 1930.

== First Sea Lord ==
Chatfield became First Sea Lord in January 1933 and was advanced to Knight Grand Cross of the Order of the Bath in the 1934 New Year Honours. As First Sea Lord he won arguments that the Royal Navy should have 70 cruisers rather than the 50 cruisers that had been agreed at the London Naval Conference 1930, that the battleship still had an important role to play despite the development of the bomber and that the Fleet Air Arm should be part of the Royal Navy rather than the Royal Air Force. Chatfield played a key role in fashioning tactics that favoured night fighting and less centralised manoeuvres as the basis of tactics for future fleet battles. The American historians Williamson Murray and Alan Millet wrote that the Royal Navy in the interwar period did a superb job in training admirals and captains in the style of the 18th and early 19th centuries, so that "...in the future there would be few of the egregious errors that marked the Battle of Jutland". Rear-Admiral (S) Sir Rowland Jerram who served under Chatfield for 20 years as his private secretary described him as: "an officer of the old school in upbringing, but certainly not lacking in imagination and breath of view; of the highest ability as a seaman, a leader and in the higher ranks, a debater, sure of himself and 100% trusted by the Navy". The British historian Andrew Gordon described Chatfield as a man of the "upmost integrity, humourless, very just, very aloof, very charming, very tactful, supremely efficient and an intellectual" and "quite possibly the best peacetime First Sea Lord the Admiralty ever had". Chatfield's principal concern upon becoming First Sea Lord was ensuring that the British shipbuilding industry, which had been hard hit by the Great Depression, received enough orders for warships to keep the industry going.

When Chatfield became the First Sea Lord, the Admiralty was in a weak position with regards to the Treasury. The Prime Minister, Ramsay MacDonald, was generally supportive of the Admiralty, but had been weakened by the split in the Labour Party in 1931 with McDonald leading a rump National Labour Party (which was the smallest of the parties that made up the governing coalition) in opposition to the Labour Party. The Foreign Secretary, Sir John Simon, was considered to be highly intelligent, but seemingly incapable of making a decision as Simon would lay out the options in foreign policy and then find himself unable to choose which option to pursue. The dominant personality in the cabinet was the Chancellor of the Exchequer, Neville Chamberlain, who was considered to be the most able minister in the National Government and already widely viewed as a future prime minister. With a weak foreign secretary and a prime minister leading a rump party in the coalition National government, the influence of the Treasury, which considered naval spending wasteful, was in the ascendency. The so-called "ten year rule" introduced in 1919 under which the service chiefs were to base their defence estimates on the assumption that there would be no major war in the next years had abandoned in early 1932 in response to Japan's aggression in China, but it was still unclear just how far the cabinet would go with rearmament. In response to Chamberlain vetoing a request from the Admiralty requesting more stockpiling of fuel, more reservists for the Royal Navy, and more aeroplanes for the Fleet Air Arm, Chatfield together with the other three sea lords wrote to the cabinet on 16 January 1933 that they could only accept the Treasury viewpoint on naval spending "if the cabinet is aware of and prepared to take responsibility for the continuance of these serious deficiencies". It was in part to resolve the dispute about what form British rearmament should go and in part how much to spend on rearmament that the Defence Requirements Committee was formed in November 1933. Chatfield found himself at odds with Chamberlain and the Treasury who favoured a return to the Anglo-Japanese alliance that had ended in 1922. The call from Chamberlain to a return to the Anglo-Japanese alliance prompted a strong reaction from the diplomats with Charles Orde, Robert Craigie, and Laurence Collier all writing that Japan was dead-set on an anti-Western course, and there was no hope of lasting understanding with Japan.

In debates with Sir Warren Fisher, the Permanent Undersecretary at the Treasury, who favored reaching an understanding with Japan, Chatfield spoke in favour of reaching an understanding with the United States. Chatfield argued that the Imperial Japanese Navy was the powerful naval force in Asia; that Japan was becoming increasingly unfriendly towards Great Britain; that Hong Kong was dangerously exposed and the Singapore naval base was far from being completed despite having work having been started in 1919; and that for all these reasons that having the United States Navy as an ally in the Asia-Pacific region would be of immense strategic benefit. Chatfield's arguments tended to win out over those of Fisher, who usually had nothing more than his visceral anti-Americanism to base his arguments on. For his first two years as First Sea Lord, Chatfield was hamstrung by awaiting the result of the 1935 Naval Disarmament conference as he could not place any orders for warships until he knew what the results of the conference would be. As First Sea Lord, Chatfield had a marked tendency to play up the threat from Japan when addressing the Defence Requirements Committee in 1933–1934, which had the task of planning British rearmament for the next five years. The Defence Requirements Sub-Committee was chaired by Maurice Hankey and consisted of Chatfield plus the other two service chiefs, namely Air Chief Marshal Edward Ellington and Field Marshal Archibald Montgomery-Massingberd along with Sir Robert Vansittart of the Foreign Office and Sir Warren Fisher of the Treasury.

For Chatfield, a war with Japan offered up the prospect of fleet battles in Asian waters, which in turn would require more funding for the Royal Navy to build the necessary warships to confront the Japanese Navy along with building and maintaining the bases to properly supply the fleet if the Singapore strategy were activated. During the meetings of the Defence sub-committee, Chatfield stated the first concern should be Japan and he favoured having the Singapore base finished along with building defences to defend Singapore. Chatfield argued that the Singapore strategy was not only the best way to deter Japan, but also offered up the prospect of an alliance with the United States. He pointed out that the United States Navy was building a new naval base in Hawaii at Pearl Harbor, which took as a sign that the United States was also concerned about Japan, and he argued that joint Anglo-American fears of Japanese expansionism could serve as the basis of an Anglo-American alliance. Besides bases, Chatfield wanted to modernise the battle fleet; buy more cruisers and aircraft; equip all warships with ASDIC; and stockpile fuel and ammunition at the various Royal Navy bases. The estimates for the naval budget came in by a third of the original defence budget, which weakened his case. During the discussions of the DRC, Chatfield tended to put an emphasis on the defence of the British Empire and the threat from Japan while Ellington called for an RAF equal to any European air force and Montgomery-Massingberd called for the British Army to have at least five divisions available to serve as an expeditionary force to France. Vansittart agreed with Chatfield that Japan was a danger, but argued that Japan would only attack if Britain were involved in a war with another European power, which Vansittart stated could only be Germany. Chatfield's efforts for a larger naval budget were undercut by a series of highly alarmist stories in the British newspapers about the power of strategic bombing to inflict a "knock-out blow" within a matter of days by razing entire cities, along with the claim that the Luftwaffe possessed such a bomber force. The hysterical claims about the Luftwaffe, which vastly exaggerated the war-winning capacity of strategic bombing, which were shared by the Lord Privy Seal, Stanley Baldwin, ensured that the Royal Air Force received the lion's share of the rearmament budget. The report of the Defence Requirements Commitment submitted to the cabinet in February 1934 called Germany "the ultimate potential enemy" against which British rearmament was to be directed against. However, in terms of recommendations the report in many ways favoured Chatfield such as in its call to finally finish the Singapore base and to strengthen British bases in Asia in general.

The Chancellor of the Exchequer, Neville Chamberlain, protested that the costs of a naval arms race with Japan; sending another large expeditionary force to aid France; and building up a strong RAF would be too much of a financial strain and that choices had to be made. Chamberlain argued that since Germany was by far the most powerful of Britain's potential enemies, the conclusion that Germany was "the ultimate potential enemy" should be strictly adhered to with regard to defence spending. As such, Chamberlain ruled that of the £76.8 million committed for defence spending in the coming fiscal year, £50.3 million was to go to the Royal Air Force. Chamberlain downplayed Chatfield's thesis of a Japanese threat on the grounds that Japan could threaten Australia, New Zealand and the British colonies in Asia while Germany could threaten the United Kingdom itself. Chamberlain concluded in a paper to the cabinet: "Our best defence would be the existence of a deterrent force so powerful as to render success in attack too doubtful to be worthwhile. I submit that this is most likely to be attained by the establishment of an air force based in this country of a size and efficiency calculated to inspire respect in the mind of a possible enemy". As part of an effort to sabotage Chatfield's case, Chamberlain ruled that no new warships were to be ordered until the 1935 naval conference was held, and in the defence estimates submitted to the House of Commons in 1934, the Army's budget was cut in half, the RAF's budget was raised and the Royal Navy's budget stayed about the same. The defence policy adopted in 1934 came to be known as "limited liability" with the thesis that Britain was an island that ruled a global empire and as such spending on air power and sea power was emphasised. Through Chatfield would have preferred greater naval spending, he did not oppose the basic assumptions of the limited liability doctrine, and he tended to favour the defence of the British empire and the Commonwealth over the defence of other states that might be threatened with aggression. Chatfield's hope in an American alliance were dashed when Lord Lothian, the former private secretary to Lloyd George and a Scottish aristocrat with excellent connections with the American elite visited Washington in September 1934 as an unofficial diplomat to sound out President Franklin D. Roosevelt. Roosevelt told Lothian that he was concerned about the Japanese claims that all of the Asia-Pacific region should be in the Japanese sphere of influence, but the strength of American isolationism was such that an Anglo-American alliance against Japan was impossible at present. The American decision to promise independence to the Philippines within the next 10 years indicated the United States would be pulling back from the Asia-Pacific region. The fact that the U.S. government had decided to grant independence to the Philippines largely for domestic reasons, namely as long as the Philippines were an American colony Filipinos could move to the United States, showed that domestic considerations took precedence over maintaining influence in Asia. As long as the United States had bases in the Philippines, it was well placed to dominate the South China Sea, a position of strength that Congress was determined to disregard as the best way to end Filipino immigration to the United States. Chatfield was forced to concede that at present there was little hope of an American alliance.

The Treaty of Versailles had ended any potential German naval threat by banning the Reich from having submarines and warships over 10,000 tons. In 1929, the German fleet consisted of six old battleships, none of which were over 10,000 tons; six light cruisers; 12 destroyers and 12 torpedo boats, which was a force that was far too small to pose any danger to British command of the sea. In December 1932, at the World Disarmament Conference in Geneva, the negotiators conceded Germany's right "in principle" to have "equality in status" in regards to arms, meaning that Germany would have the weapons forbidden by the Treaty of Versailles. Chatfield was in favour of accepting Adolf Hitler's offer on 21 May 1935 of a German fleet that would be 35% of the tonnage of the Royal Navy under the grounds that Germany was going to violate the Treaty of Versailles anyway and acceptance of this offer would push German naval-building in the direction that would be least dangerous to the Royal Navy. Chatfield did not want the Germans to embrace upon a guerre de course strategy of having dozens of the Deutschland-class "pocket battleships" operating in tandem with groups of U-boats to attack British shipping around the globe, and much preferred that the Germans build a battlefleet that mirrored British priorities as that would be the easier fleet for the Royal Navy to defeat. Owing to the lengthy period of time it took to construct warships, Royal Navy planners predicated that the Kriegsmarine would not be a threat in the 1930s and the earliest the German fleet could pose a danger would be sometime in the 1940s. Chatfield supported the Anglo-German Naval Agreement of 1935, which he argued secured British security by limiting the Kriegsmarine to 35% of the Royal Navy. Chatfield noted in the Anglo-German Naval Agreement the 35% principle applied to tonnage categories of warships instead of the complete fleet, meaning that Germany would build battleships up to 35% of the tonnage of British battleships, 35% of the tonnage of British cruisers and so on, which favored British interests.

In 1935, Italy made open preparations to invade Ethiopia, which was a member of the League of Nations. As Baldwin had made a point of running on a platform on emphasising support for the League of Nations and collective security in the general election of that year, it was expected that Britain would have to take some sort of action if Italy invaded. Chatfield reported that if the League of Nations imposed oil sanctions on Italy, it would cause an Italian economic collapse as Italy had no oil of its own, and would probably provoke Benito Mussolini into a desperate "mad dog" attack on Britain. However Chatfield reported it might be worth going to war with Italy because it offered a chance to "reassert our dominance over an inferior race". During the Abyssinia crisis, Chatfield was regarded as the senior service chief whose advice Baldwin (who knew nothing of military affairs) generally followed The First Lord of the Admiralty, Sir Bolton Eyres-Monsell, tended to follow Chatfield's advice, being more a representative of the Admiralty in the cabinet rather than its master. Chatfield was personally hostile towards the League of Nations, arguing that the principle of collective security could embroil Britain in wars where no British "vital interests" were at stake. Chatfield defined "vital interests" as the defence of the British Empire and the Commonwealth. Chatfield argued that for the Singapore strategy to work required use of the Mediterranean rather than sending the fleet the long way around Africa, and he preferred a friendly Italy to an unfriendly Italy, saying he saw no reason to antagonise Mussolini for a "moral motive".

Chatfield reported to the cabinet that 76% of all imports to Italy came via the sea with 62% of all Italian imports coming from the Atlantic Ocean via the Strait of Gibraltar, 3% of Italian imports via the Suez canal, and the other 11% coming from other Mediterranean nations or from nations bordering the Black Sea. Chatfield in a memo to the cabinet on 3 September 1935 wrote: "With our forces based in Gibraltar and in Egypt, her main communications can be cut with comparatively little effort to ourselves, whereas to take any steps (excepting by submarine) to counter our action she would have to send her forces far from their bases where they would be brought to action. This strategical advantage is so great that it is highly unlikely that Italy could make any serious effort with naval forces to interfere with our control of the two exits to the Mediterranean except by action of her submarines, which could not prove to be decisive. Further, Italy's objective is the prosecution of her Abyssinian war, and the mere closing of the [Suez] canal to her by the presence of our naval forces (whether the closing is done in the canal itself or by action outside of it) might be decisive within a measurable period". Chatfield admitted that if Britain did go to war with Italy, it might led to the Regina Marina temporarily taking control of the central Mediterranean, which in effect would be the same thing as severing the Suez canal, but he did not expect this advantage to last as he had a low opinion of the Italian admirals, whom he noted were promoted on the basis of loyalty to the House of Savoy rather than merit, which was the case with the Royal Navy.

Despite his bluster, Chatfield advised caution as the Royal Navy had only 15 capital ships in 1935 (a fraction of the number available in the First World War), and even the loss of a few capital ships could be devastating as a single battleship cost millions of pounds to build and took several years to complete. In a memo to the Foreign Secretary Sir Samuel Hoare, Chatfield wrote: "we must never forgot that we have no naval margin at all, and the loss of one or two ships would be a serious matter for us". Chatfield stressed at present the battleships of the Royal Navy were in a process of being modernised by rotation. A number of warships were in the docks being equipped with radar, asdic and other aspects of modern technology. As such he had only 7 battleships available for operations at present. In a memo to Fisher on 25 August 1935, Chatfield wrote: "...that a hostile Italy is a real menace to our Imperial communications and defence system. We have relied on practically abandoning the Mediterranean if we send our fleet east. For that reason, I do not want to go to extreme measures and hope the Geneva pacifists will fail to get unanimity and the League will break up". Chatfield stated that a war with Italy would likely lead to several British warships being sunk, which would take several years to replace, which would undermine the Singapore strategy. Though Chatfield expressed much confidence that the Royal Navy's Mediterranean fleet was capable of defeating the Regia Marina, in a memo to Vansittart, he wrote: "I was surprised to find how unready the other two services were and how long it would take before they could give effective resistance to Italian action by land or air. The naval situation is bad enough....it would be a serious business if the great League of Nations, having at last agreed to act together, was able to be flouted by the nation it was trying to coerce". Chatfield advised against imposing oil sanctions on Italy, saying that a war with Italy was not worth the cost. Chatfield stressed that there was a danger that Japan might take advantage of an Anglo-Italian war, and predicated in the event of a war with Japan that Hong Kong would probably be lost as Hong Kong could not withstand a "determined attack" and that Singapore was "dangerously weak".

In particular, Chatfield stated it was unclear if France would also join in a war against Italy, saying the support of France would be essential. Chatfield stated that the main British base in the Mediterranean in Malta was too exposed to Italian air and naval attacks, and could not be used. As for the other British bases in the Mediterranean, there were no docks for capital ships at Gibraltar and at the base in Alexandria the docks were only big enough for light cruisers and destroyers. For this reason, Chatfield stated it was imperative that the Royal Navy's Mediterranean fleet have permission to use the docks for capital ships at the French Mediterranean fleet's bases at Toulon and Bizerta, and as such it was crucial that Britain have the support of France in confronting Italy. The French Premier, Pierre Laval, was committed to achieving a Franco-Italian alliance, and though he pleaded support to the League of Nations, he did so in a manner that suggested grudging, half-hearted support. On 30 October 1935 in a meeting in London, Rear Admiral Jean Decoux of the French Naval General Staff promised Chatfield that France would also go to war if Britain went to war against Italy, though Decoux admitted that it would take several weeks before the Marine would be able to commence operations against the Regia Marina. Decoux sheepishly admitted to Chatfield that the level of competence in the French Navy was so low that it would take at least three or four weeks after war was declared before the French Mediterranean fleet would be ready for operations. Chatfield was less interested in having the Marine join the proposed war than the offer that the British Mediterranean fleet could use the bases at Toulon and Bizerta for docking and repairs. The Chatfield-Decoux talks ended with the agreement that in the event of war, the French Mediterranean fleet would patrol the western Mediterranean while the British Mediterranean fleet would patrol the eastern Mediterranean. Ultimately, Baldwin and his cabinet chose not to go to war for the sake of Ethiopia as the cabinet wished to prevent a break-up of the Stresa Front and because no-one in the cabinet really cared about Ethiopia. One of the lasting effects of the Abyssinia crisis was that Chatfield was able to obtain cabinet approval of upgrading the facilities at Alexandria and Gibraltar.

In the middle of the Abyssinia crisis, on 7 March 1936, Germany violated the Treaty of Versailles and the Treaty of Locarno by remilitarising the Rhineland. Under the terms of the Treaty of Versailles, the Rhineland had been declared a permanent demilitarised zone, an obligation Germany had voluntarily accepted under the terms of the Treaty of Locarno. In the latter treaty, Britain and Italy had "guaranteed" the current Franco-German and German-Belgian borders established by the Treaty of Versailles along with the demilitarised Rhineland. Chatfield advised the government not to go to war against Germany, arguing with much of the British fleet stationed in the Mediterranean Sea for a potential war with Italy, it would be too dangerous to go to war against the Reich. He argued that though the German fleet was very "small" at present, the Kriegsmarine was a highly professional force and with so much of the British fleet in the Mediterranean, British trade routes were wide open to German attacks and he could not guarantee that coastal cites and towns along the North Sea coast would not be bombarded by German warships. He stressed that the two fast-moving German "pocket battleships", the Deutschland and the Admiral Graf von Spee could only be hunted down by the equally fast moving battlecruisers HMS Hood and HMS Renown that had equally big guns, both of which were currently in the Mediterranean. Given the Abyssinia crisis, Chatfield did not want to return the Hood and Renown to home waters, and argued that the government had to choose between focusing on the Abyssinia crisis or the Rhineland crisis as he did not feel that Britain could take on Germany and Italy at the same time. Chatfield's assessment of Britain's options had much influence on decision-making, especially on Anthony Eden who replaced Hoare as Foreign Secretary following the latter's resignation in December 1935.

Chatfield did not see U-boats as a serious threat, partly because of ASDIC and partly because the Germans built very few 700-ton ocean-going U-boats with the majority of the U-boats constructed being 500 ton sea-going or 200 ton coastal U-boats. Moreover, it was known that Admiral Erich Raeder, the commander-in-chief of the Kriegsmarine favoured a traditional battleship-centric fleet designed to win a decisive battle of annihilation and did not care much for the guerre de course strategy. Reports from the British naval attaché in Berlin indicated that Admiral Karl Dönitz, the commander of the U-boat arm and the foremost advocate of a guerre de course strategy of using submarines to attack shipping, was an outsider in the Kriegsmarine with most German admirals favouring a revival of the High Seas Fleet. All intelligence at the time indicated that the Kriegsmarine was focused on building the cheaper and simpler 500 ton Type VII sea-going U-boats (which were the main U-boat type in World War Two) at the expense of the superior ocean-going Type IX U-boats. The decision to focus on building the inferior Type VII submarines instead of the Type IX was understood as a sign that Raeder was planning to use the U-boats as an ancillary to the main German battle fleet, instead of a war-winning weapon in and of itself. Raeder had in fact planned to defeat Great Britain via the gigantic fleet envisioned in the famous Z plan of January 1939, and had embraced a guerre de course strategy via the U-boats in September 1939 by default as construction of the Z plan fleet had barely started. Raeder wrote glumly in the Kriegsmarine war diary on 3 September 1939 that the war had come five years too early and that all the Kriegsmarine could do now was "die gallantly".

The American historian Joseph Maiolo wrote that the U-boats were a menace in the first years of the Second World War primarily because of a change in tactics with Dönitz championing the "wolf pack" tactic of having groups of U-boats attack convoys together rather than because of any technological advantage. Along with the change in tactics was the advantage that the Kriegsmarine gained upon taking control of the French Atlantic ports in June 1940, which gave the Germans direct access to the North Atlantic, most notably the Western Approaches, and it was only in the summer of 1940 that the U-boats started to sink significant numbers of ships. The limited range of the Type VII U-boats along with the need to travel from and to Germany via the North Sea imposed limitations on the ability of the U-boats to sink shipping in the North Atlantic, and prior to gaining the use of the French Atlantic ports, the U-boats were a "nuisance" rather than a threat. Chatfield predicated that the earliest that the Kriegsmarine could build up to the 35% tonnage ratio allowed by the Anglo-German Naval Agreement would be 1942, and that if Hitler decided to go beyond the limits allowed by the AGNA, it would be sometime after 1942. Much like Raeder, Chatfield envisioned a repeat of the First World War where the Grand Fleet based in Scapa Flow faced off against the High Seas Fleet based in Wilhelmshaven and Kiel. Until the Z plan was launched, Hitler had consistently placed the Kriegsmarine third in defence spending behind the Army and the Luftwaffe, which was known to British intelligence, and led Chatfield to predicate it would be some time before Germany could construct a fleet that would be dangerous for British interests. Chatfield for a time favoured encouraged German expansionism into Eastern Europe as a way to encourage Hitler to spend more Reichsmarks on the Wehrmacht at the expense of the Kriegsmarine as he believed a German conquest of Eastern Europe would impose "liabilities" on the Reich. Chatfield did not understand the military weaknesses of most of the Eastern European states, and that allowing Germany to conquer Eastern Europe would undercut a British blockade as all of the natural resources needed to sustain a modern industrial economy were to be found in Eastern Europe.

He was promoted to Admiral of the Fleet on 3 May 1935. Having taken part in the funeral of King George V in January 1936 and the coronation of George VI in May 1937, he was raised to the peerage as Baron Chatfield of Ditchling in the County of Sussex on 11 June 1937.

Baldwin had little interest in foreign policy, and during his last government left foreign policy to be managed by the Foreign Secretary Anthony Eden along with Chatfield, who largely determined British policy with regard to the Spanish Civil War. Chatfield had a marked pro-Nationalist bias, once writing that the Spanish Nationalist cause was "a much nobler cause than the Reds". On 5 August 1936, Admiral François Darlan arrived in London to see Chatfield to discuss the Spanish Civil War. Darlan expressed much concern about the Italian and German intervention in Spain on the Nationalist side and was especially worried about the prospect of Italy obtaining naval and air bases in the Balearic Islands. Likewise, Darlan was concerned about the prospect of German air and naval bases in the Canary Islands. Darlan suggested that Britain and France take action to stop Italy and Germany from obtaining any bases in either archipelago which might change the naval balance of power in the western Mediterranean and/or the eastern Atlantic. Chatfield was surprised that Darlan had come all the way from Paris to see him about the Spanish Civil War instead of having Charles Corbin, the French ambassador to the court of St. James, discuss the matter with him. The idea of sending Darlan to London had originated with a Labour MP Philip Noel-Baker who was a close friend of the French socialist leader Léon Blum who had just become the premier of France. Noel-Baker had suggested to Blum that it would be best to send an admiral to London to win Chatfield over to opposing Axis intervention in Spain, which in turn might win Baldwin over as Chatfield had much influence with Baldwin on defence and foreign policies. Noel-Baker's suggestion inspired Blum to dispatch Darlan on his mission. Darlan reported to Blum that Chatfield was blasé about the prospect of a Nationalist victory, saying that he disliked the Republican government and viewed General Francisco Franco as a "Spanish patriot" who would never grant bases to either Germany or Italy. The British historian Jill Edwards wrote that Chatfield's sympathies with the Spanish Civil were "more White than Red", but he did not hesitate to use the war in Spain as a "stick with which to beat the Government". Eden came to hold views very similar to the French position on Spain, arguing that the prospect of Italian and/or German bases in Spain was too dangerous for Britain, through he never expressed any affection for the Spanish republic. Eden and Chatfield constantly fought over the issue of Spain with Eden arguing that the Royal Navy should do more to end the Italian submarine attacks on ships going to Spain.

On 12 December 1937, Chatfield's vision of Anglo-American co-operation was brought much closer to fruition after the Japanese aircraft sank an American gunboat, USS Panay in the Yangtze river despite the Panay clearly flying an American flag and Japanese artillery damaged a British gunboat, HMS Ladybird when the Ladybird tried to pick up survivors from the Panay. In response to the unprovoked Japanese attacks on Anglo-American gunboats in the Yangtze, President Franklin D. Roosevelt had spoken vaguely to Sir Ronald Lindsay, the British Ambassador in Washington, about his wish for a joint Anglo-American blockade of Japan, saying that the Japanese were completely out of control and something would have to be done. In January 1938, Roosevelt dispatched Captain Royal E. Ingersoll of the United States Navy to London to hold secret talks with Chatfield about plans for a war with Japan. The talks were hampered by the fact that both Chamberlain who was now prime minister and Roosevelt had imposed the condition that the purpose of the talks was merely to gather information about the other side's war plans, but Chatfield insisted that the United States and the United Kingdom should co-ordinate their policies in Asia as much as possible as he stated that the two English-speaking nations had common concerns.

Chatfield stated he resisted Chamberlain's attempts to move piecemeal Royal Navy ships to Singapore and wanted the Singapore strategy activated first, before any steps were taken that might risk a war with Japan. Chatfield further told Ingersoll that there should be unity of command with Anglo-American forces in the Asia-Pacific region, but "that as a principle he believed that since the two fleets would probably be separated at first and probably for some time, there could not be unity in command in a tactical or strategical and that strategical co-operation would be all that was possible". Chatfield suggested that there be close intelligence-sharing between the British and American navies along with a common means of communication such as a joint cipher. Chatfield soon discovered during the talks that Ingersoll had no real power to negotiate anything, the purpose of his visit was more for information-gathering, and that Roosevelt had wanted the British to take the lead in confronting Japan as the president did not feel that Congress would grant him the necessary authority to go to war. Ingersoll noted that a blockade was an act of war under international law, and Roosevelt would need permission from Congress to impose a blockade of Japan. Despite these caveats, Chatfield and Ingersoll agreed to a record of conversation that committed both sides to intelligence sharing, a joint cipher, a discussion of war plans, and permission to use each other's waters in Asia-Pacific region (though Chatfield was unable to make any promises on behalf of Australia and New Zealand). The Chatfield-Ingersoll talks did not lead to any action against Japan in 1938 as Roosevelt chose to accept the Japanese claim that the sinking of the Panay was a "mistake", but it marked the beginning of secret Anglo-American naval talks that help draw the United States out of isolationism. In April 1938, Chatfield did not oppose the Anglo-Irish treaty that turned over the Royal Navy's bases in Ireland to the Eire government, which in turn affected the Royal Navy's ability to defend the Western Approaches. He defended the decision to hand over the Irish treaty ports under the grounds that Germany would need to have control of the French Atlantic ports to pose a serious threat to the Western Approaches, writing in his 1947 memoirs: "With a French ally with an efficient navy, and a neutral, but friendly Norway, the Admiralty believed they could hold the position. Actually, their judgement in the envisioned circumstances proved right; the situation was held satisfactorily until the fall of Norway and the collapse of France". He retired from the Royal Navy in August 1938.

In late 1938 Chatfield chaired the Expert Committee on the Defence of India which, using the work of the 1938 Auchinleck Committee, recommended that the arena of India's defence should be re-focussed more on her sea communications and less on her North-Western Land Frontier as well as the modernisation of the British Indian Army, the re-equipment of the RAF squadrons and the re-stocking of war stores.

== Minister for Coordination of Defence ==
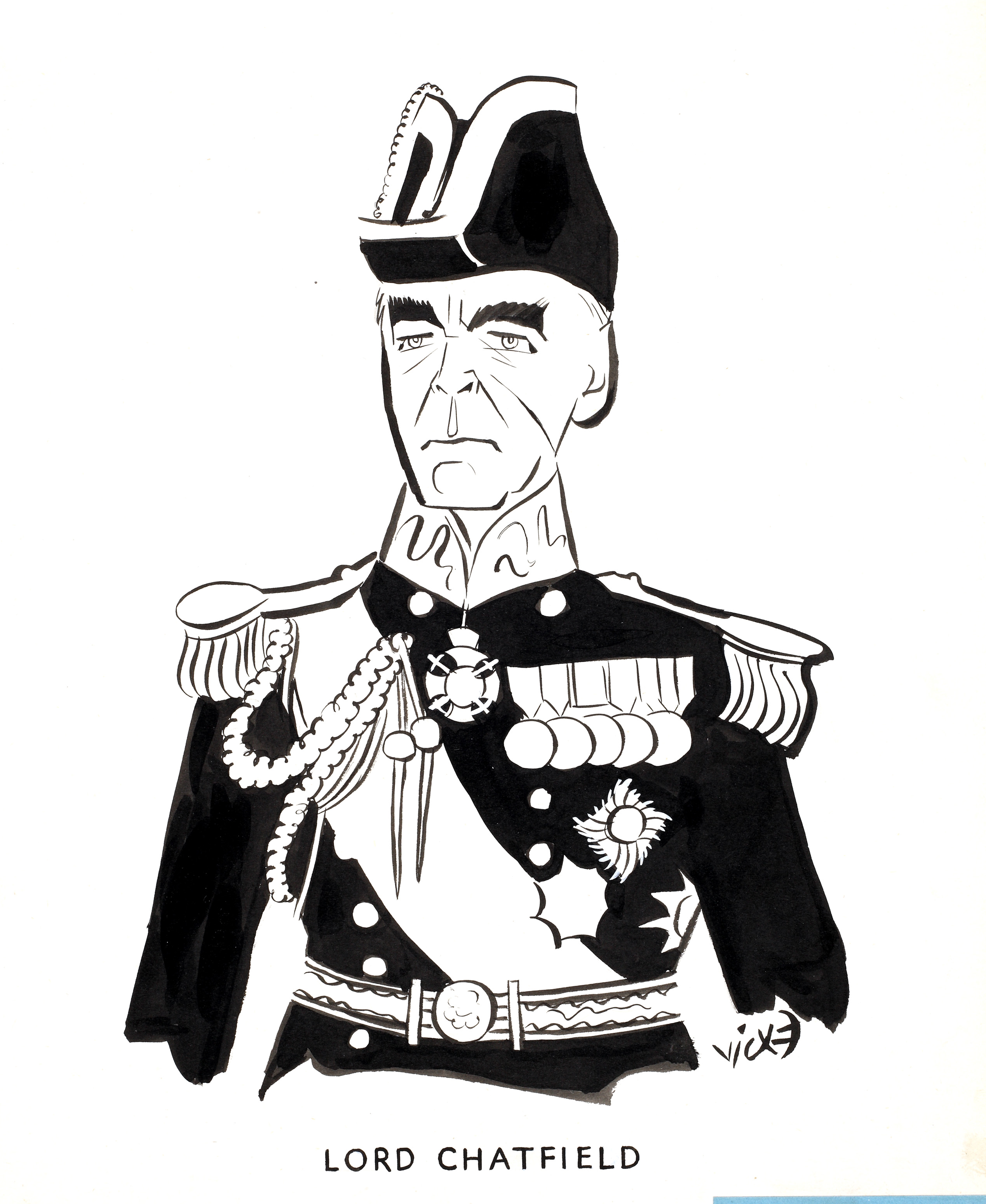
Victor Weisz's caricature of Chatfield

Having been appointed to the Order of Merit in the 1939 New Year Honours, in February Chatfield succeeded Sir Thomas Inskip as Minister for Coordination of Defence in the government of Neville Chamberlain, despite having a non-political background. He was sworn of the Privy Council at the same time.

In the "European Appreciation for the years 1939 and 1940" issued by the chiefs of staff in February 1939, it was starkly warned that Britain could not win a war against an alliance of Germany, Italy and Japan, stating if war broke out against the Axis states, the Royal Navy would have to sacrifice either the Mediterranean Sea or the South China Sea as there was no way to break up the fleet to deal with all three potential enemies at once. The possibility of the loss of naval dominance in the Mediterranean was understood as leading to the loss of the Middle East to Italy while the possibility of reneging on the Singapore Strategy and leaving Australia and New Zealand to face Japan by themselves was considered equally unappealing. The "European Appreciation" set off a bitter bureaucratic row between Chatfield who argued for sticking to the Singapore strategy as for him the loss of the British colonies in Asia along with Australia and New Zealand to the Japanese was unthinkable vs. the First Sea Lord, Roger Backhouse, who argued for a Mediterranean strategy. Backhouse along with his principal adviser, Admiral Reginald Drax, won the debate against Chatfield with the decision by the cabinet that in the event of war that Royal Navy would focus on winning command of the sea in the Mediterranean first; only after the defeat of Italy would the Singapore strategy be activated and until Italy was defeated, Australia and New Zealand would have to face Japan on their own. Adding to the bitterness of the debate was the sudden decision on the part of the Chamberlain cabinet to abandon its long-standing "limited liability" defence doctrine and make the "continental commitment". Leslie Hore-Belisha, the War Secretary, argued very strongly that Britain would have to send a large expeditionary force to France in the event of a war, arguing that if France were defeated, the limited liability doctrine would be useless as Germany would be able to spend more reichmarks on the Luftwaffe and the Kriegsmarine. The decision to expand the British Army to make the "continental commitment" led to a fierce debate about how many pounds to devote to the new, expanded Army.

In March 1939 Chatfield urged an increase in munition production: "Would it not be possible to put industry on a war production basis immediately, not necessarily at the expense of our export trade but by curtailing internal consumption?" However the President of the Board of Trade, Oliver Stanley, objected: "Such a step would be almost revolutionary, and must be proved absolutely essential before introduction". In March 1939 during the Danzig crisis, Chatfield supported the Foreign Secretary, Lord Halifax, in his call for a declaration calling an alliance of the Soviet Union, France and Britain to defend Poland and Romania. However, Chamberlain expressed much doubt about the military effectiveness of the Red Army; noted that the Soviet Union had no frontier with Germany; and expressed "the most profound distrust of Russia" as he put on 26 March 1939. In addition, Chamberlain was always keen to keep British foreign policy coordinated with the Commonwealth, and the governments of Australia, Canada and South Africa all expressed strong opposition to an Anglo-Soviet alliance. As such, Chamberlain declared that the eastern pivot of the "peace front" to deter Germany from war would be Poland rather than the Soviet Union. In cabinet debates Chatfield along with Halifax, Hore-Belisha, and the Home Secretary Samuel Hoare tended to favour broadening the "peace front" to include the Soviet Union as all had doubts about the ability of Poland to stand alone against Germany. Against them were ranged were Chamberlain and the Chancellor of the Exchequer, Sir John Simon, who kept citing evaluations by the British Army calling the Red Army "of little use". During the Danzig crisis, Winston Churchill-a former First Lord of the Admiralty-wrote to Chatfield calling for a Royal Navy "deterrent" squadron to be sent into the Baltic Sea. The purpose of the "deterrent" squadron was to both threaten to cut the Reich off from supplies of high-grade Swedish iron ore (Germany had no high-grade iron ore of its own) and to distract the Wehrmacht by posing the threat of amphibious landings in northern Germany. Expecting the Soviet Union to join the "peace front", Churchill suggested that the Baltic squadron use Kronstadt, the main base for the Soviet Baltic fleet, as its base. Chatfield wrote back on 29 March 1939, saying that Churchill's plan was "quite possible" provided that neither Italy and/or Japan entered the war.

On 11 April 1939 the Foreign Policy Committee decided that the question of Russia's potential as an ally should be referred to the Chiefs of Staff. Chatfield said that it was clear the political arguments against a Russian alliance outweighed any possible military benefits and that the Chiefs of Staff should only report on Russia's military capability. On 24 April 1939 the Chiefs of Staff submitted their report and rated Russia's military effectiveness low. The next day Chatfield gave the Cabinet Committee on Foreign Policy a summary of this report: "Russia, although a great Power for other purposes, was only a Power of medium rank for military purposes...Her assistance would be of considerable, though not of great, military value". On 16 May 1939 Lord Halifax said that the political reasons for not allying with Russia were stronger than the strategic reasons for such an alliance. Chatfield responded: "...if for fear of making an alliance with Russia we drove that country into the German camp we should have made a mistake of vital and far-reaching importance". By 1939, Chatfield did a volte-face on the importance of Eastern Europe, now arguing in contradiction to his previous views, that to allow the Reich to conquer Eastern Europe or otherwise bring it into the German sphere of influence, was too dangerous for British interests as it would make Germany immune to a British sea blockade.

In May 1939, Sir Roger Backhouse, the First Sea Lord, changed the Singapore strategy from sending all of the capital ships to Singapore to only sending 4 capital ships to Singapore in the event of trouble from Japan. Chatfield greatly disapproved of Backhouse's alternations to the Singapore strategy and attempted unsuccessfully to change the strategy back to how he had drafted it. On the debates in the House of Commons on 18–19 May 1939, Chamberlain was hammered by Churchill on the issue of an alliance with the Soviet Union. Well briefed by Ivan Maisky, the Soviet ambassador in London, Churchill argued that there was no realistic way for British troops to reach Poland in the event of war; that the purpose of the "peace front" was to deter Germany from invading Poland; and that Chamberlain's offer that Britain would sign an alliance with the Soviet Union if Germany invaded Poland defeated the whole purpose of the "peace front". In the cabinet, Chatfield made similar arguments that Churchill made in the House of Commons. In June 1939, General Petar Pešić of the Yugoslav General Staff visited London to meet Chamberlain, Halifax, and Chatfield to discuss what Yugoslavia would do if the Danzig crisis turned to war. Pešić argued that Yugoslavia's sympathies were with the Allies, but Yugoslavia would declare neutrality in the event of war, which he argued would be of advantage to the Allies. Pešić assured Chatfield and the other British ministers that when the Allies had command of the sea in both the Mediterranean and Adriatic seas, Yugoslavia would enter the war on the Allied side. Pešić admitted that Yugoslavia was too backward and poor to have any hope of victory against the Reich, but argued that neutrality could be of advantage to the Allies because if Yugoslavia was defeated, Germany would have access to all of Yugoslavia's vast natural resources, but if Yugoslavia entered the war with Allied support, the said natural resources could be denied to Germany. During the Tientsin incident, Chatfield called very strongly for the Singapore strategy to be activated by sending 7 of the Royal Navy's 11 capital ships available (the other 4 were being refitted) to Singapore. The Imperial Japanese Navy had 9 capital ships, but Chatfield stated that because of the "Oriental inferiority" in seamanship that 7 British capital ships would be sufficient to win a war against Japan. At the same time, tensions were escalating in the Free City of Danzig (modern Gdańsk), and it was felt that Germany could attack Poland at any moment as almost every day there were incidents between the Poles and the Germans in the Free City. At the key meeting of the Foreign Policy Committee of the Cabinet on 26 June 1939, Chatfield pressed for the Singapore strategy to resolve the Tientsin crisis if necessary by force, but Lord Halifax stated that Britain could only run the risk of war with Japan in the event of French and American support, neither of which was likely. The French Premier, Édouard Daladier, had stated that given the crisis in Danzig, there was no possibility of France risking a war with Japan while the administration of Franklin D. Roosevelt made it clear that the United States would not risk a war with Japan for the sake of a British concession in China. As such, the committee chose not to activate the Singapore strategy in order to focus on the Danzig crisis, and chose to settle the Tientsin crisis via diplomacy, much to Chatfield's disappointment.

At about 10: 30 am on 1 September 1939, Count Edward Bernard Raczyński, the Polish ambassador to the Court of St. James, telephoned Halifax to tell him that Poland had been invaded earlier that morning, and as such he expected Britain to honor the "guarantee" of Poland by declaring war on the Reich. At an emergency cabinet meeting called at 11: 30, Chatfield stated he wanted the time limit on any British ultimatum to Germany to be as short as possible, and that an ultimatum should be sent "without any more delay". At another cabinet meeting on 2 September 1939, Chatfield again spoke for sending an ultimatum to Berlin "without delay", arguing the delay in declaring war on Germany was damaging British national honor. At an emergency session of the House of Lords on the same day, Chatfield in a speech called for an ultimatum to be sent no later than midnight. At a meeting on the evening of 2 September 1939 with Chamberlain at 10 Downing Street, Chatfield argued for an ultimatum to be delivered at 2:00 am Berlin time with an expiry of 6:00 am, saying there was no time to waste.

The plans for a British naval expedition into the Baltic were a fixture with Churchill who upon being appointed First Lord of the Admiralty again on 3 September 1939 pressed for the operation to be launched under the codename Catherine. However, objections that the threat of Luftwaffe attacks on any British warships operating in the Baltic, the lack of any port as Kronstadt was unavailable following the Molotov-Ribbentrop pact, and the threat that Germany would seize Denmark and with it the Danish Straits that link the Baltic Sea to the North Sea all solved to abort Operation Catherine. Churchill who served alongside Chatfield in the Chamberlain cabinet between September 1939-April 1940 was not impressed with him, and chose not to include him in his war cabinet.

== Retirement ==
Chatfield resigned as Minister for Coordination of Defence in April 1940 and subsequently chaired a committee on the evacuation of London's hospitals. In June 1941, Chatfield submitted the first draft of his memoirs to the Cabinet Secretary, Edward Bridges. Bridges wanted to extensively censor the third part of Chatfield's memoirs entitled "The Naval and Political Story of Our Lack of Preparation for War". Bridges argued that Chatfield revealed far too much about decision-making in the MacDonald, Baldwin and Chamberlain governments and would "give rise to controversy and weaken our war effort". Chatfield appealed to Churchill who partially sided with him. Churchill disliked Chatfield whom he described "as a sailor who prolonged his official life after he left the Navy by building up credit with advocates of appeasement". However, Churchill ruled that Chatfield could not publish his memoirs as written in wartime, but after the war he could publish his memoirs uncensored as "there are only a few things which should never be mentioned". Churchill seemed to be angling to establish a precedent to allow him to publish an uncensored war memoir after the war. On 24 November 1941, Churchill told the cabinet that Chatfield would have to submit to Bridges's censorship if he wanted to publish his memoirs in wartime, but after the war he would be free to publish an unexpurgated version. Chatfield retired to his home at Farnham Common in Buckinghamshire and became Deputy Lieutenant of that county on 15 June 1951. He died at his home there on 15 November 1967.

== Family ==
In July 1909 he married Lillian Emma Matthews (d.1977); they had two daughters and a son. Their son, Ernle, succeeded his father as Baron Chatfield. He followed him into the Royal Navy, serving as Aide-de-Camp to the Governor General of Canada between 1940 and 1945. The 2nd Baron settled in Victoria, British Columbia. Their elder daughter, Angela (Lady Donner) married Sir Patrick Donner MP. Their younger daughter, Katharine, married Henry Duckworth, son of Sir George Duckworth.

== Arms ==
Coat of arms of Ernle Chatfield, 1st Baron Chatfield
Crest An heraldic antelope’s head erased Argent gorged with a naval crown Or. Escutcheon Or a griffin segreant Sable on a chief Purpure an anchor between escallops of the first. Supporters On the dexter side an Admiralty Messenger holding in the exterior hand his staff and on the sinister side a gunner of the Royal Navy resting the exterior hand on a shell all Proper. Motto Pro Aris Et Focis

== Sources ==
- Barnett, Correlli (2002). The Collapse of British Power. Pan. ISBN 978-0571281695.
- Birn, Donald (July 1970). "Open Diplomacy at the Washington Conference of 1921-2: The British and French Experience". Comparative Studies in Society and History. 12 (3): 297–319. doi:10.1017/S0010417500005879.
- Buchanan, Thomas (1997). Britain and the Spanish Civil War. Cambridge: Cambridge University Press. ISBN 9780521455695.
- Colton, Joel (1966). Leon Blum: Humanist in Politics. Knopf Doubleday Publishing Group. ISBN 978-0-307-83089-0. LCCN 65-18768. OCLC 265833.
- Edwards, Jill (1979). The British Government and the Spanish Civil War, 1936–1939. London: Palgrave Macmillan. ISBN 9781349040032.
- Emmerson, J.T. (1977). The Rhineland Crisis 7 March 1936 A Study in Multilateral Diplomacy. Ames: Iowa State University Press.
- Duroselle, Jean-Baptiste (2004). France and the Nazi Threat The Collapse of French Diplomacy 1932-1939. New York: Enigma Books. ISBN 9781929631155.
- Heathcote, Tony (2002). The British Admirals of the Fleet 1734 – 1995. Pen & Sword Ltd. ISBN 0-85052-835-6.
- Gordon, Andrew (1988). British Seapower and Procurement Between the Wars A Reappraisal of Rearmament. London: Macmillan. ISBN 9781349089581.
- Gordon, Andrew (1996). The Rules of the Game Jutland and British Naval Command. Annapolis: Naval Institute Press. ISBN 9781612512327.
- Kavic, Lorne (1967). India's Quest for Security: Defence Policies, 1947–1965. California University Press. ASIN B0000CNPVE.
- Kennedy, Greg (2009). "Symbol of Imperial Defence: The Role of Singapore in British and American Far Eastern Strategic Relations, 1933-1941". In Brian Ferrel (ed.). A Great Betrayal The Fall of Singapore Revisited. London: Marshall Cavendish. pp. 32–52. ISBN 9789814435468.
- Johnsen, William T. (2016). The Origins of the Grand Alliance Anglo-American Military Collaboration from the Panay Incident to Pearl Harbor. Lexington: University Press of Kentucky. ISBN 9780813168357.
- Kennedy, Greg (2013). Anglo-American Strategic Relations and the Far East, 1933-1939 Imperial Crossroads. London: Taylor & Francis. ISBN 9781136340086.
- Kennedy, Greg (October 2017). "Filling the Void?: Anglo-American Strategic Relations, Philippine Independence, and the Containment of Japan, 1932–1937". The International History Review. 39 (5): 836–859. doi:10.1080/07075332.2017.1283639.
- Lambert, Andrew (2013). "The Only British Advantage: Seapower and Strategy, September 1939-June 1940". In Marcus Faulkner & Michael H. Clemmesen (ed.). Northern European Overture to War, 1939-1941 From Memel to Barbarossa. Paderborn: Verlag Ferdinand Schöningh. pp. 45–74. ISBN 9789004249097.
- Marder, Arthur (1974). From the Dardanelles to Oran Studies of the Royal Navy in War and Peace, 1915–1940. Annapolis: Naval Institute Press. ISBN 9781612519944.
- Maiolo, Joseph (1998). The Royal Navy and Nazi Germany, 1933-1939 A Study in Appeasement and the Origins of the Second World War. London: Macmillan Press. ISBN 0-312-21456-1.
- Maiolo, Joseph (2010). Cry Havoc How the Arms Race Drove the World to War, 1931-1941. New York: Basic Books. ISBN 9780465022670.
- Morewood, Sean (2016). ""This silly African business": the military dimension to Britain's response to the Abyssinian crisis". In G.Bruce Strang (ed.). Collision of Empires Italy's Invasion of Ethiopia and Its International Impact. London: Taylor & Francis. pp. 73–108. ISBN 9781317164173.
- Mordal, Jacques (1974). 25 Centuries of Sea Warfare. Futura. ISBN 978-1299679412.
- Neilson, Keith (June 2003). "The Defence Requirements Sub-Committee, British Strategic Foreign Policy, Neville Chamberlain and the Path to Appeasement". The English Historical Review. 118 (477): 651–684. doi:10.1093/ehr/118.477.651.
- Peden, G. C. (2022). Churchill, Chamberlain and Appeasement. Cambridge: Cambridge University Press. ISBN 9781009201988.
- Reynolds, David (2004). In Command of History Churchill Fighting and Writing the Second World War. New York: Random House Publishing Group. ISBN 9780307824806.
- Sloan, Geoffrey (Fall 2019). "The Royal Navy and Organisational Learning: The Western Approaches Tactical Unit and the Battle of the Atlantic". Naval War College Review. 4 (72): 124–149.
- Stedman, Andrew (2009). ""Then What could Chamberlain do other than what Chamberlain?": the enduring need for a more nuanced understanding of British policy and alternatives to appeasement". In Gaynor Johnson (ed.). The International Context of the Spanish Civil War. Cambridge: Cambridge Scholars Publisher. pp. 87–116. ISBN 9781443809436.
- Murray, Williamson; Millett, Allan Reed (2000). A War to Be Won: Fighting the Second World War. Cambridge: Harvard University Press. ISBN 978-0-674-00680-5.
- Watt, D.C. (1989). How War Came. New York: Pantheon. ISBN 9780394579160.
- Wragg, David (2006). Royal Navy Handbook 1914–1918. Sutton. ISBN 978-0750942034.

Military offices
Preceded by Sir Hugh Tothill	Fourth Sea Lord; 1919–1920	Succeeded by Sir Algernon Boyle
Preceded by Sir Cyril Fuller	Third Sea Lord and Controller of the Navy; 1925–1928	Succeeded by Sir Roger Backhouse
Preceded by Sir Hubert Brand	Commander-in-Chief, Atlantic Fleet; 1929–1930	Succeeded by Sir Michael Hodges
Preceded by Sir Frederick Field	Commander-in-Chief, Mediterranean Fleet; 1930–1932	Succeeded by Sir William Fisher
Preceded by Sir Frederick Field	First Sea Lord; 1933–1938	Succeeded by Sir Roger Backhouse
Political offices
Preceded by Sir Thomas Inskip	Minister for Coordination of Defence; 1939–1940	Office abolished
Peerage of the United Kingdom
New creation	Baron Chatfield; 1937–1967	Succeeded by Ernle David Lewis Chatfield
