= Addison (surname) =

- Pronunciation: AD-ih-sun

Origin
- Region of origin: Scotland

Addison is a Scottish patronymic surname meaning "son of Addie", a Scottish Lowlands nickname for Adam.

Notable people with the surname include:

== A ==
- Aaron Addison (born 1995), Australian tennis player
- Adele Addison (born 1925), American soprano
- Agnes Addison (1842–1903), New Zealand draper
- Albert Christopher Addison (1862–1935), English writer
- Alexander Addison (disambiguation), multiple people
- Alwin Addison (1887–1971), Australian cricketer
- Angela Addison (born 1999), English footballer
- Anita W. Addison (1952–2004), American film director
- Arthur Addison (1842–1915), Australian politician

== B ==
- Ben Addison (born 1985), Scottish rugby player
- Benjamin N. O. Addison, Ghanaian politician
- Berkeley Addison (d.1882), British clergyman
- Bernard Addison (1905–1990), American guitarist
- Bishara Addison, American politician
- Bob Addison (1908–1988), Australian footballer
- Bralon Addison (born 1993), American football player

== C ==
- Calen Addison (born 2000), Canadian ice hockey player
- Carlotta Addison (1849–1914), English actress
- Charles G. Addison (1812–1866), English barrister
- Chris Addison (born 1971), English comedian
- Christopher Addison, 1st Viscount Addison (1869–1951), British politician
- Christopher Addison, 2nd Viscount Addison (1904–1976), British politician
- Cliff Addison (1913–1994), British chemist
- Colin Addison (1940–2025), English football player and manager
- Corban Addison, American author
- Corran Addison (born 1969), South African canoeist

== D ==
- Daniel Dulany Addison (1863–1936), American clergyman and writer
- Derek Addison (born 1955), Scottish footballer
- Dylan Addison (born 1987), Australian football player

== E ==
- Edward Addison (1898–1987), English Air Force commander
- Ernest Addison (born 1963), Ghanaian economist

== F ==
- Fanny Addison (1844–1937), English actress

== G ==
- George Addison (disambiguation), multiple people
- Gulston Addison (1673–1709), British politician

== H ==
- Harry W. Addison (1920–2003), American author and humorist
- Henry Addison (disambiguation), multiple people

== J ==
- Jackie Addison (born 1962), American politician
- James Thayer Addison (1887–1953), American priest
- Jane Addison (1771–1851), English social figure
- Jim Addison (1884–1957), Australian footballer
- John Addison (disambiguation), multiple people
- Jonathan Addison (born 1965), English cricketer
- Jordan Addison (born 2002), American football player
- Joseph Addison (disambiguation), multiple people
- Juliana Addison (born 1974), Australian politician

== K ==
- Karen Addison (born 1970), Scottish curler
- Kodwo Addison (1927–1985), Ghanaian politician

== L ==
- Lancelot Addison (1632–1703), English priest
- Lancelot Addison (Archdeacon of Dorset) (??–1955), English priest
- Laura Addison (1822–1852), English actress
- Leonard Addison (1902–1975), British diplomat
- Linda Addison (disambiguation), multiple people
- Lily Addison (1885–1982), Australian tennis player
- Lily Isabel Maude Addison (1885–1968), Australian architect
- Lucy Addison (1861–1937), American teacher

== M ==
- Margaret Addison (1868–1940), Canadian educator
- Mario Addison (born 1987), American football player
- Michael Addison (disambiguation), multiple people
- Miles Addison (born 1989), English football player

== N ==
- Nancy Addison (1946–2002), American actress

== P ==
- Paul Addison (1943–2020), British author and historian
- Percy Addison (1875–1952), English admiral

== R ==
- Rafael Addison (born 1964), American basketball player
- Rex Addison, Australian architect
- Robert Addison (missionary) (1754–1829), English missionary
- Robert Brydges Addison (1854–1920), English composer
- Robyn Addison (born 1984), British actress
- Roger Addison (1945–2010), Welsh rugby player
- Roy Addison (1939–2021), British boxer

== S ==
- Shari Addison (born 1962), American musician
- Susan Addison (born 1955), English trombonist

== T ==
- Terry Addison (born 1946), Australian tennis player
- Thomas Addison (1793–1860), English doctor
- Tom Addison (1936–2011), American football player
- Tom Addison (baseball), American baseball player
- Tavar Addison (Born 2008) American football player

== W ==
- Walter Addison (disambiguation), multiple people
- Will Addison (born 1992), English rugby player
- William Addison (disambiguation), multiple people

== See also ==
- Addison (disambiguation)
- Addison (given name)
- Viscount Addison (disambiguation)
