= Addison =

Addison may refer to:

== Places ==
=== Canada ===
- Addison, Ontario, a community

=== United Kingdom ===
- Addison (ward), a ward in London

=== United States ===
- Addison, Alabama, a town
- Addison, Illinois, a village
- Addison Junction, Michigan, an unincorporated community
- Addison, Kentucky, an unincorporated community
- Addison, Maine, a town
- Addison, Michigan, a village
- Addison, New York, a town
  - Addison (village), New York
- Addison, Ohio
- Addison, Pennsylvania, a borough
- Addison, Tennessee, an unincorporated community in McMinn County
- Addison, Texas, a town
- Addison, Vermont, a town
- Addison, West Virginia, the official name of the town commonly called Webster Springs
- Addison, Wisconsin, a town
  - Addison (community), Wisconsin, an unincorporated community
- Addison County, Vermont
- Addison Township (disambiguation), several places

== Transportation ==
- Addison Avenue, a street in Notting Hill, London
- Addison Road (disambiguation)
- Addison Street, Chicago, Illinois, which runs by Wrigley Field
- Addison Railroad (disambiguation)
- Addison station (disambiguation)
- Addison Motor Company, an early 20th century British car and motorcycle manufacturer

== Other uses ==
- Addison (given name), a list of people and fictional characters
- Addison (surname)
- Addison (album), a 2025 album by Addison Rae
- Addison (restaurant), a Michelin-starred restaurant in San Diego
- Addison's disease, endocrine disorder
- Addison, a Beanie Baby baseball-themed teddy bear made by Ty, Inc.

== See also ==
- Addison Lee, British private hire taxi company based in London
- Edison (disambiguation)
