= Mary Stuart (Haynes play) =

1840 play

- Original language: English
- Written by: James Haynes
- Genre: Tragedy
- Setting: Scotland, 16th century

Premiere
- Date: 22 January 1840
- Place: Theatre Royal, Drury Lane, London

Mary Stuart is an 1840 historical tragedy by the Irish writer James Haynes. It is based on the assassination of David Rizzio, a courtier to Mary, Queen of Scots. The play was staged as part of an ambitious plan to relaunch the reputation of London's Theatre Royal, Drury Lane by the new manager William John Hammond, but faced issues of censorship from Charles Kemble and the Lord Chamberlain's office.

It premiered at the Theatre Royal, Drury Lane on 22 January 1840. The original cast featured Mary Warner as Mary Stuart, William Macready as Earl of Ruthven, Samuel Phelps as Earl of Darnley, Henry Howe as George Douglas, Edward William Elton as Rizzio, George Yarnold as Earl of Bothwell, Sarah West as Countess of Argyle and Fanny Cooper as Celine. Haynes dedicated the work to Macready.

== Bibliography ==
- Nicoll, Allardyce. A History of Early Nineteenth Century Drama 1800-1850. Cambridge University Press, 1930.
- Stephens, Russell. The Censorship of English Drama 1824-1901. Cambridge University Press, 2010.
