= John Addison (disambiguation) =

John Addison (1920–1998) was a British composer, especially of film scores.

John Addison may also refer to:

- John Addison (divine) (fl. 1538), English divine
- John Addison (1765–1844), British composer and double-bass player
- John Hollings Addison (1929–2010), Canadian politician and businessman
- John Addison (MP) (1838–1907), British judge and Conservative politician
- John Addison (engineer), Scottish structural engineer

== See also ==
- Addison (surname)
