= Adisson =

Adisson is a surname. Notable people with the surname include:

- Frank Adisson (born 1969), French slalom canoeist
- Gaelle Adisson (born 1974), American musician

== See also ==
- Addison (name)
- Alisson
