= Sadler's Wells Theatre =

Theatre in London, England

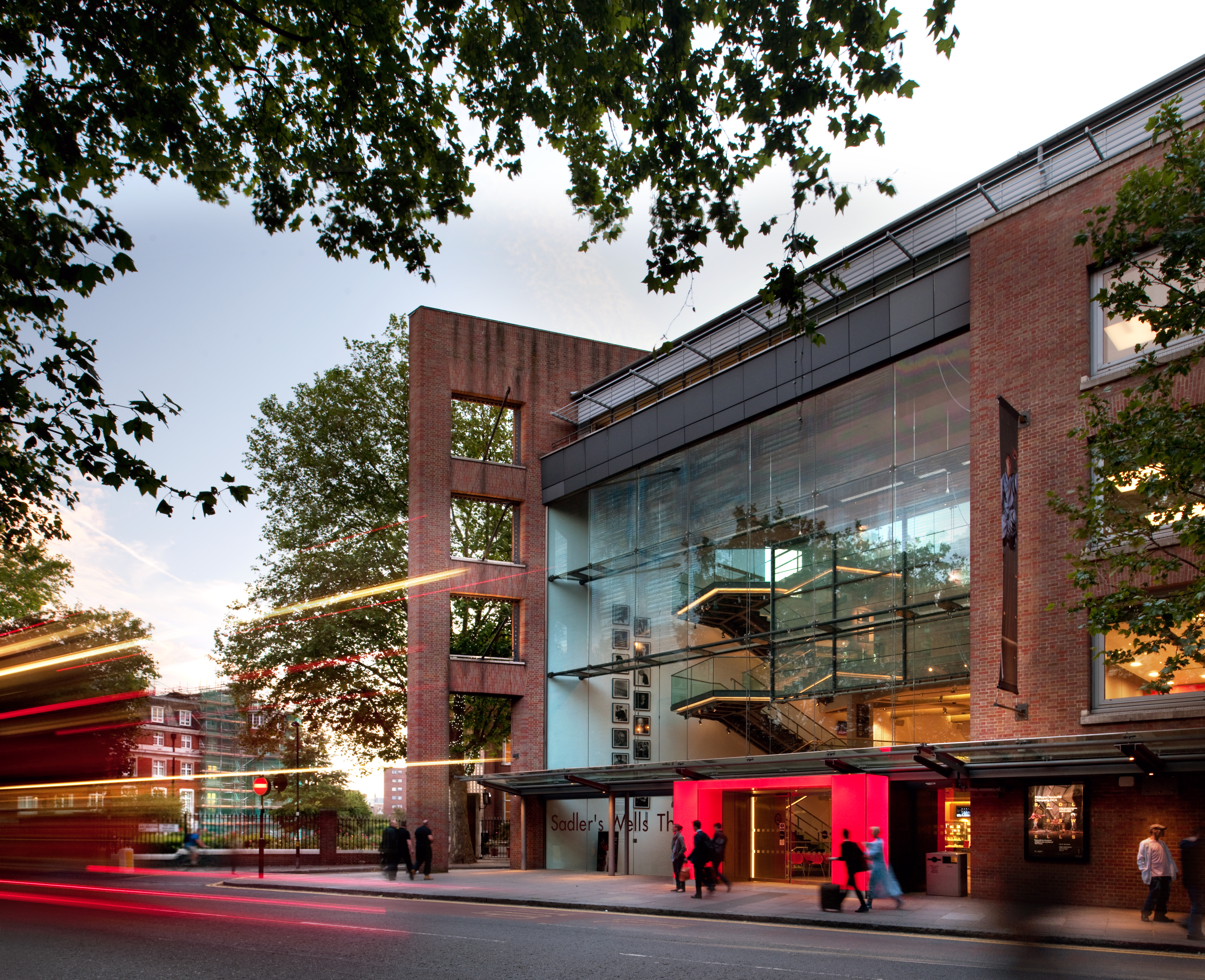
- Sadler's Wells in 2015
- Interactive map of Sadler's Wells Theatre
- Address: Rosebery Avenue; London, EC1; England
- Coordinates: 51°31′46″N 0°06′22″W
- Owner: Sadler’s Wells Trust
- Capacity: 1,500 on three levels 200 Lilian Baylis Studio
- Type: Dance, production and receiving house
- Designation: Grade II listed

Construction
- Opened: c. 1683

Website
- www.sadlerswells.com

Sadler's Wells Theatre is a performing arts venue in London, located in Rosebery Avenue, Islington. The present-day theatre is the sixth on the site. Sadler's Wells grew out of a late 17th-century pleasure garden and was opened as a theatre building in the 1680s.

Lacking the requisite licence to perform straight drama, the house became known for dancing, performing animals, pantomime, and spectacular entertainments such as sea battles in a huge water tank on the stage. In the mid-19th century, when the law was changed to remove restrictions on staging drama, Sadler's Wells became celebrated for the seasons of plays by Shakespeare and others presented by Samuel Phelps between 1844 and 1862. From then until the early 20th century the theatre had mixed fortunes, eventually becoming abandoned and derelict.

The philanthropist and theatre owner Lilian Baylis bought and rebuilt the theatre in 1926. Together with Baylis's Old Vic, Sadler's Wells became home to dance, drama and opera companies that developed into the Royal Ballet, the National Theatre and English National Opera. From the 1930s to the 1980s the theatre was home to 21 London seasons by the D'Oyly Carte Opera Company; from the 1950s to the 1970s the English Opera Group, founded by Benjamin Britten, had its London base at Sadler's Wells; and between the 1950s and 1980s the Handel Opera Society staged productions there. Visiting dance troupes included the Alvin Ailey and Merce Cunningham companies, the Dance Theatre of Harlem, London Contemporary Dance Theatre and the Ballet Rambert.

The current theatre dates from 1998. It consists of two performance spaces: a 1,500-seat main auditorium and the Lilian Baylis Studio, with extensive rehearsal rooms and technical facilities also housed within the site. Sadler's Wells is now chiefly known as a dance venue. As well as hosting visiting companies, the theatre is also a producing house, with associated artists and companies who create original works for the theatre. Sadler's Wells maintains an additional base at the Peacock Theatre in the West End as well as opening a new theatre, Sadler's Wells East Theatre, in Stratford, London in 2025.

== History ==
=== First theatre: c. 1683–1765 ===
Details of the origins of Sadler's Wells are disputed. According to Dennis Arundell in his history of the theatre, its founder was called Dick Sadler. Many other sources, from the 18th century onwards, say the same, (Note: Other sources give Sadler the full forename Richard.) but others give Sadler the forename Thomas, and according to the Survey of London he was Edward. It is also uncertain when Sadler established his auditorium: many sources give the year as 1683; others give it as 1684 or 1685. According to Arundell, Sadler had already opened his "Musick-House" at an unspecified date before 1683; a history of the house published in 1847 confines itself to saying that the house was built at some time after the creation of the adjoining New River in 1614.

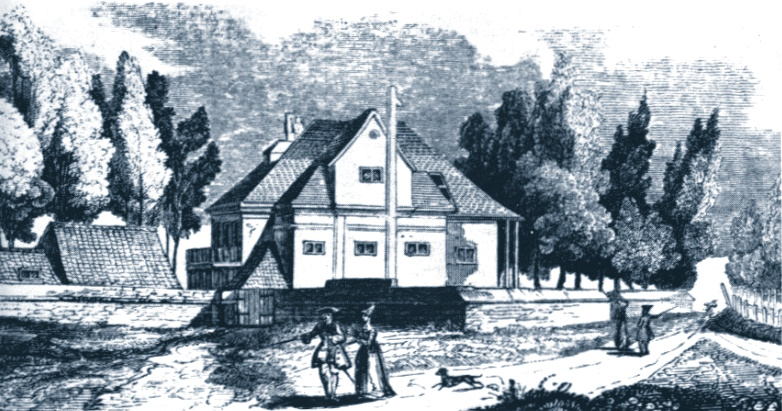
The first, wooden, Sadler's Wells "Musick-House"

A well with water from a mineral spring was discovered on Sadler's land in Islington, near the boundary with Clerkenwell. After an eminent physician tested the water and praised its supposed health-giving properties, Sadler found two more wells nearby. Taking the waters was fashionable at the time – there were popular spas at Bath, Tunbridge and Epsom – and Sadler started marketing the water from his wells. Visitors to the Musick-House began to drink it, and many London physicians recommended their patients to do so. By the end of the summer of 1685 five or six hundred people frequented the Musick-House every morning for the water. Sadler laid out ornamental gardens and engaged entertainers to amuse his patrons: there were tumblers, rope-dancers and musicians. Sadler took as his business partner a violinist, Francis Forcer, who was both dancing-master and composer.

The initial popularity of Sadler's spa did not last long, and by 1691 it had ceased to be a fashionable resort. He sold two of his wells, and the original one dried up for a time; his entertainments became the main draw for those of the public still interested. There is no documentary proof, but Arundell conjectures that by 1697 Sadler had either died or retired; Forcer went into partnership with a glover, James Miles, and the wooden auditorium was renamed "Miles's Musick-House". Under their management the public could hear ballad singers and see jugglers, wrestlers, fighters, dancing dogs and, according to the theatre's 21st-century historian, "even a singing duck".

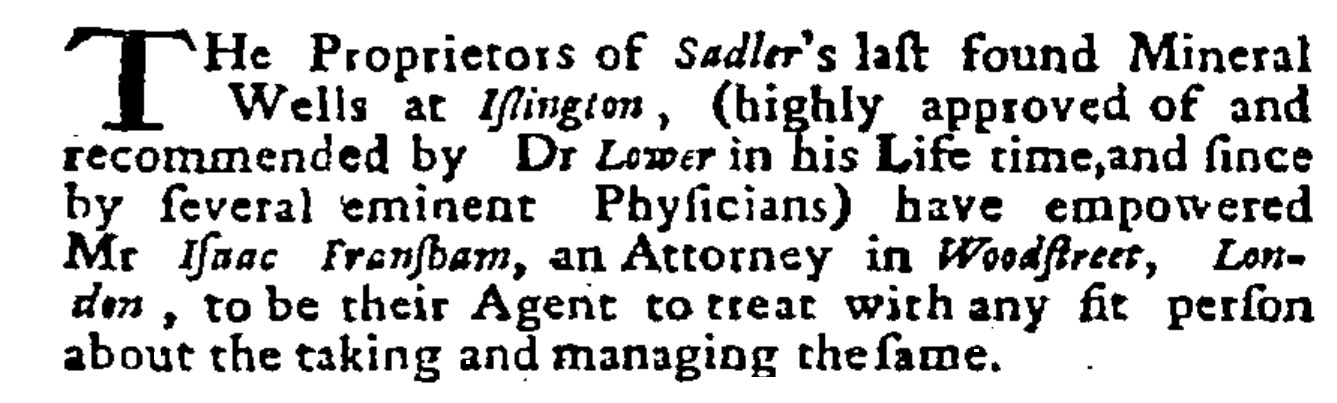
1700 newspaper advertisement

In the early years of the 18th century the reputation of the spa declined. By the time Hogarth produced his Four Times of the Day series in 1736, the theatre had lost any vestiges of fashionability and was satirised as having an audience consisting of tradesmen and their pretentious wives. Ned Ward described the clientele in 1699 as:

Butchers and bailiffs, and such sort of fellows,

Mixed with a vermin train'd up for the gallows,
As Bullocks and files, housebreakers and padders,
With prize-fighters, sweetners, and such sort of traders,
Informers, thief-takers, deer stealers, and bullies.

The proprietors advertised for a new manager in 1700, but the decline continued. In 1711, after its fashionable clients had taken their trade elsewhere, Sadler's Wells was described in The Inquisitor as "a nursery of debauchery", and the place was frequented by many "unaccountable and disorderly" people. In 1712 a man called French was sentenced to death at the Old Bailey for killing a Mr Thwaits at Sadler's Wells.

Miles died in 1724, and under Forcer's son the auditorium was "entirely new modelled and made every way more commodious than heretofore for the better reception of company". Forcer junior sought to improve standards – according to one historian he "succeeded, to a great degree," in driving away "the mass of incomprehensible vagabonds" – but after his death in 1743 John Warren took over, and standards fell again, to the extent that the authorities closed the place. The lease was acquired by Thomas Rosoman and Peter Hough, who reopened Sadler's Wells in April 1746. According to Arundell they "thereby started twenty years' prosperity for the old wooden theatre". Rosoman substantially reconstructed the wooden building in 1748–49.

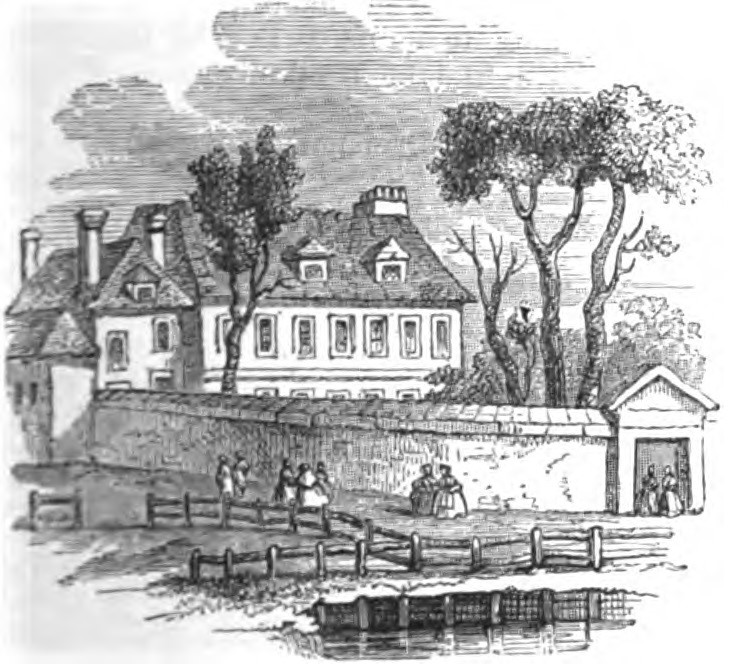
Sadler's Wells in 1745

Rosoman engaged a regular resident company of actors, and the old Musick-House became a theatre. Rosoman introduced burlettas, at that time a genre new to England. According to the current laws, only the two patent companies were permitted to present non-musical dramas. Sadler's Wells and other theatres were obliged by the Minor Theatres Act (1751) to avoid spoken dialogue. To circumvent this rule, theatre managers had their actors speaking against a continuous background of instrumental music, so that it was passed off as a musical entertainment. In general the authorities did not enforce the letter of the law with particular rigour. The Tempest was performed there in 1764, but Arundell suggests it was not Shakespeare's original, but "Garrick's version of the Dryden-Shakespeare-Purcell work castrated into an opera".

In 1763 Rosoman engaged the dancers from the Theatre Royal, Drury Lane. This suited both theatres, as at that time Sadler's Wells customarily opened from late spring to early autumn and the patent theatres were open for the other half of the year. Arundell comments that this engagement added to the prestige of Sadler's Wells "and ultimately benefited the place enormously, for the new Ballet Master was Giuseppe Grimaldi". (Grimaldi's son, Joseph, later became one of Sadler's Wells's star attractions.) Rosoman prospered and in the summer of 1764 he announced that Sadler's Wells would be pulled down at the end of the season and rebuilt "in a most elegant manner".

=== Second theatre: 1765–1802 ===
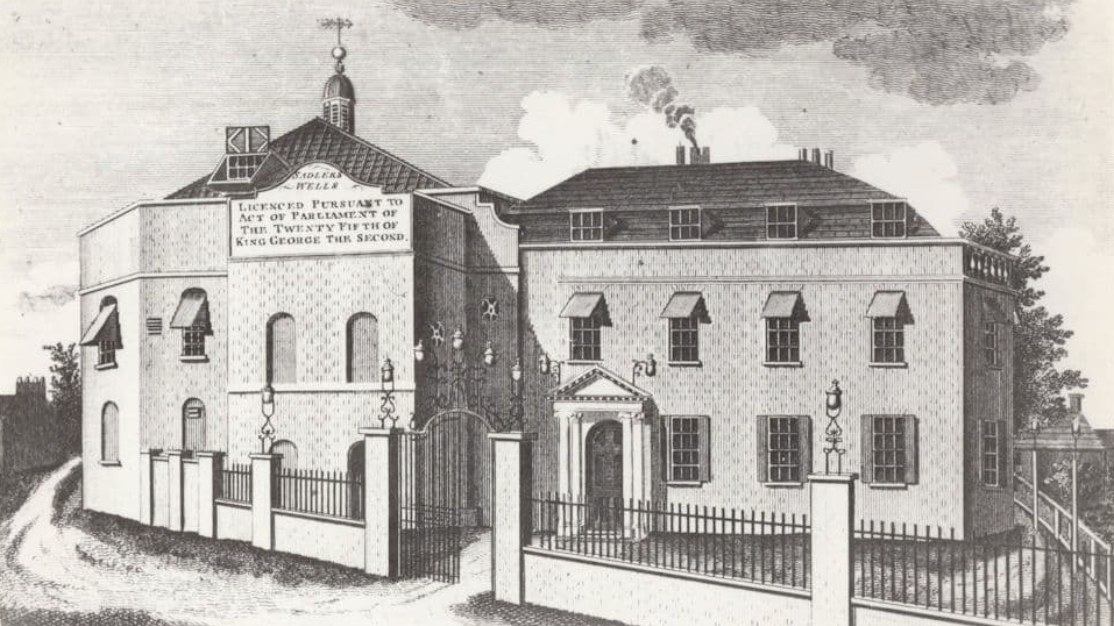
Rosoman's theatre

Rosoman was a builder by trade, and he had the wooden theatre replaced with a brick structure. The new building was completed in seven weeks, and cost £4,225; it opened in April 1765. The new house was well received: a London newspaper reported, "Sadler's Wells is now rebuilt and considerably enlarged; each of the entrances is decorated with an elegant iron gate and pallisades [with] a degree of splendor and magnificence ... that do equal honour to the taste and liberality of the Proprietor".

In 1771 Rosoman retired. He sold his three-quarter share in the theatre to Thomas King, a friend and Drury Lane colleague of Garrick. (Note: The other quarter was held by a goldsmith called Arnold, who appears to have taken no direct part in the running of the theatre.) King took over the management from December 1771, and continued to offer entertainments of the traditional variety – tumblers, singers, acrobats and "Several surprising and pleasing Performances by Messrs Sigels, lately arrived from Paris". Although his own tastes favoured the dramatic, King catered for the tastes of his audiences, and in particular featured pantomimes, establishing the theatre as a rival to the Theatre Royal, Haymarket in that genre. His shows, with music by Charles Dibdin, included such pieces as Vineyard Revels, or, The Harlequin Bacchanal, and The Whim-Wham, or, Harlequin Captive. In 1781 Joseph Grimaldi made his debut, aged two, dancing with his sister.

In the 1790s Dibdin was stage manager as well as composer, (Note: Before the 20th century, the term "stage-manager" covered the artistic functions now ascribed to directors as well as the purely technical aspects of staging to which "stage-manager" has subsequently come to be restricted.) with Grimaldi as comic star. The theatre was by now in need of renovation, not least because of concerns about safety. The proprietors, led by William Siddons, husband of Sarah Siddons, proposed "an Entire new inside" so that "the Building will be a stable one for fifty years to come".

=== Third theatre: 1802–1879 ===
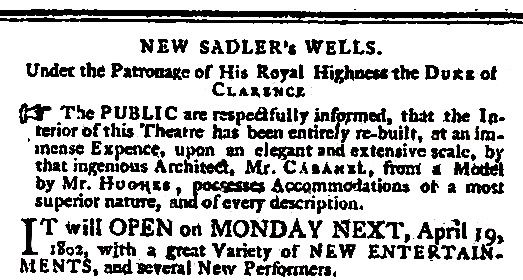
Press advertisement, 1802 – The patron, the Duke of Clarence, is the future King William IV

Sadler's Wells reopened in 1802 with an interior "entirely re-built at an immense Expence". In 1804 it acquired a new attraction, dubbed the Aqua-show. A huge water tank (Note: The tank was 90 feet long, 25 feet wide, and 5 feet deep (approximately 27.5 x 7.5 x 1.5 metres).) was installed under the stage for the production of aquatic spectacles. This tank and a second, above the stage to provide waterfall effects, were supplied with water from the New River alongside the theatre. The historian Shirley S. Allen writes that such was the remarkable realism in the performance of sea stories that Sadler's Wells became for thirty years the home of the "nautical drama". Grimaldi, by the early 19th century established as "the unchallenged king of clowns", continued as the theatre's principal clown until 1820, while pursuing a parallel career at Drury Lane.

The law restricting non-musical drama to the two patent theatres was repealed by the Theatres Act 1843, and the following year serious drama came to Sadler's Wells. From 1844 to 1862 the actor Samuel Phelps managed and starred at the theatre. He intended to bring Shakespeare to the masses. Sadler's Wells at this stage had a largely local Islington audience, working class and relatively uneducated; economically the theatre had its advantages: a large capacity (2,500) and a low rent.

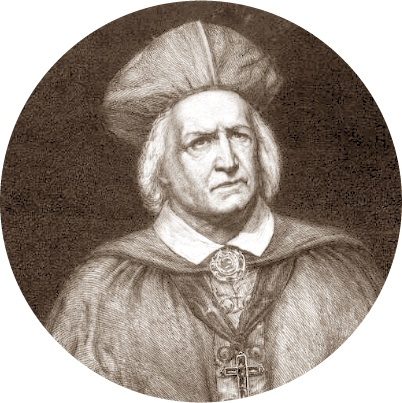
Samuel Phelps as Wolsey in Henry VIII

Phelps believed that the theatre should be a "place for justly representing the works of our great dramatic poets", particularly since the leading London theatres were not presenting "the real drama of England". His biographer J. P. Wearing writes:

So began one of the most glorious reigns of any London theatre, during which Phelps produced more than 1,600 performances of thirty-one of Shakespeare's plays (the exceptions were Henry VI, Titus Andronicus, Richard II, and Troilus and Cressida), together with numerous works from the Renaissance to the mid-nineteenth century.

Among the leading players in Phelps's company were Laura Addison, George Bennett, Fanny Cooper and Isabella Glyn; Phelps starred in roles from Hamlet to Falstaff. His productions purged Shakespeare's texts of 18th-century alterations and additions, and he presented the plays with attention to period detail and dramatic veracity. The theatre began to attract audiences from beyond Islington, including literary figures such as Charles Dickens and John Forster.

After Phelps's withdrawal in 1862 the theatre presented a variety of shows, but despite appearances by stars such as J. L. Toole, Hermann Vezin and the young Nellie Farren, they made little impact. A succession of managements tried unsuccessfully to make the theatre pay; in 1874 it closed, and there were plans to turn it into baths and washhouses. The building, by that time in a perilous state of repair, was used as a roller-skating rink and for lectures, boxing and wrestling, until in August 1878 Sidney Bateman, who had been running the Lyceum Theatre in the West End, bought the unexpired thirty-three year term of the lease of Sadler's Wells.

=== Fourth theatre: 1879–1915 ===
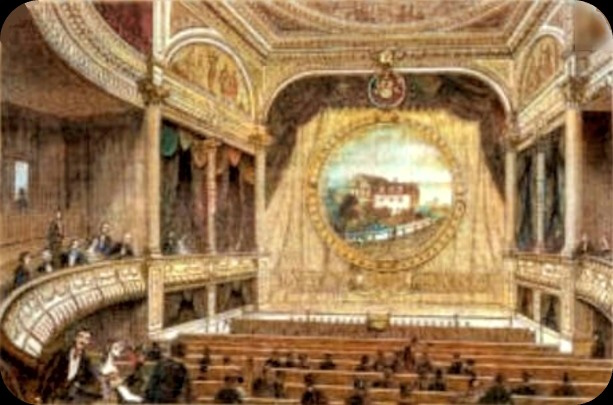
Interior of C. J. Phipps's theatre, 1879

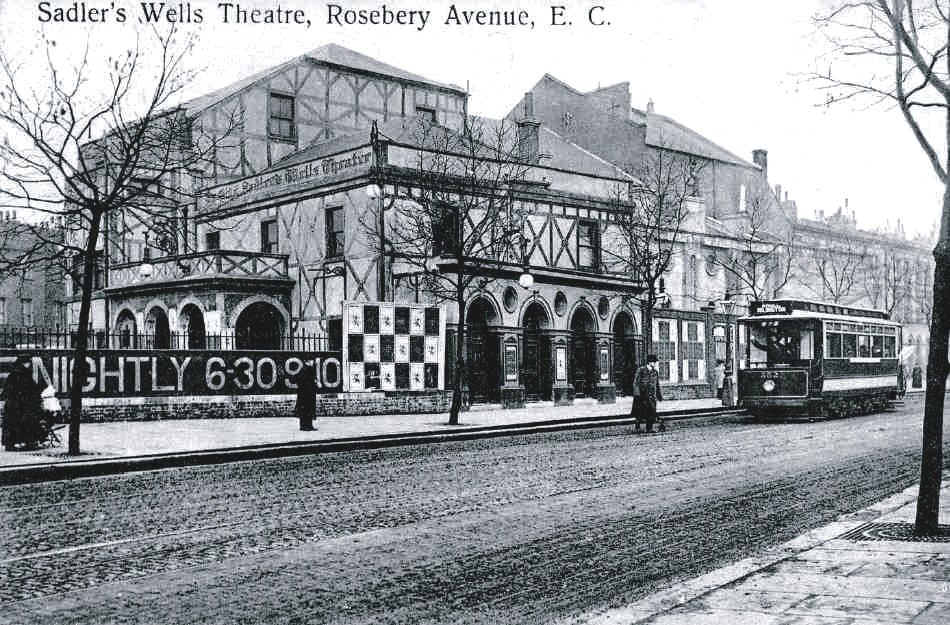
1910 photograph, showing Bertie Crewe's portico added in 1894

Bateman commissioned C. J. Phipps to design a new interior for the theatre, which reopened in October 1879. Phipps remodelled the auditorium, with a stronger horseshoe profile for the front of the dress circle and the gallery above. These extended further toward the stage than the previous circle and gallery, increasing the theatre's capacity. The theatrical newspaper The Era reported, "The changes made are so remarkable that Sadler's Wells may now claim to be one of the largest and most conveniently-constructed London Theatres". By this time Islington was no longer an isolated village but an inner suburb of the capital, and The Era remarked, "no part of London can be reached with greater facility, as omnibuses, trams, &c, from various directions pass the Angel, not two hundred yards from Sadler's Wells."

Bateman hoped to restore the theatre's reputation as a classical playhouse, as in Phelps's time, but she died in 1881. The historian Philip Temple quotes an earlier writer's comment that despite Bateman's improvements, "in the 1880s the Saturday night gallery contained the most villainous, desperate, hatchet-faced assembly of ruffians to be found in all London". There were several attempts to convert the theatre into a music hall, but the authorities refused to license it.

The only major changes to Phipps's building was the addition by the architect Bertie Crewe of a new portico in 1894, aligned to the newly completed Rosebery Avenue. In the early years of the 20th century the theatre doubled as a cinema, showing films on Sundays, with live shows – described as "cowboy melodramas" – during the week, but it did not prosper. The drama critic of The Daily Chronicle wrote in February 1914, "Poor wounded old playhouse! Here it stands even now, shabby and disconsolate, its once familiar frontage half hidden with glaring posters".

With the support of leading theatre figures including Bernard Shaw, Arthur Wing Pinero and Seymour Hicks, a plan was put forward in 1914 for saving the building and turning it into "a people's theatre". The outbreak of the First World War led to the abandonment of the plan, and Sadler's Wells declined into dereliction. It closed in 1915 and did not reopen after the war.

=== Fifth theatre: 1931–1998 ===
Lilian Baylis, 1924

Since 1914 the theatre proprietor and philanthropist Lilian Baylis had run drama and opera companies at her south London theatre, the Old Vic, with cheap prices aimed at attracting a local, working-class audience. In 1925 she began a campaign to reopen the derelict Sadler's Wells on a similar basis. She raised the necessary funds and the new theatre was designed by F. G. M. Chancellor, who had succeeded Frank Matcham as senior partner of Matcham and Co..

The new theatre opened with a gala performance on 6 January 1931 of Shakespeare's Twelfth Night starring John Gielgud as Malvolio and Ralph Richardson as Toby Belch. Acquiring Sadler's Wells enabled Baylis to set up a dance company, something she had wished to do since 1926 when she engaged Ninette de Valois to improve the standard of dancing in operas and plays at the Old Vic. The three companies Baylis founded developed over the next three decades to become the Royal Ballet, the National Theatre and English National Opera.

For the first few years the opera, drama and ballet companies, known as the "Vic-Wells" companies, moved between the Old Vic and Sadler's Wells but by 1935 the established pattern was drama at the former and opera and ballet at the latter. In 1935 both the opera and ballet companies went on summer tours for the first time. In their absence the D'Oyly Carte Opera Company took the theatre for a season of Gilbert and Sullivan, the first of 21 such London seasons at Sadler's Wells, returning in every decade until the 1980s. (Note: Sadler's Wells had the advantage over the Savoy Theatre, D'Oyly Carte's traditional London home, of a substantially larger seating capacity: 1,639 as against 1,138. The company gave sixteen seasons at the Savoy and other London theatres between 1938 and its closing in 1982, but it gave most of its London seasons at Sadler's Wells from 1935 onwards.)

After Baylis died in 1937 the Vic-Wells Ballet was led by de Valois and the opera company was under the direction of Tyrone Guthrie. In the Second World War the government requisitioned Sadler's Wells as a refuge for those made homeless by air-raids. The two companies toured for the duration of the war. When the theatre reopened in 1945 the companies were briefly reunited there, but de Valois objected to Guthrie's treatment of her company as the junior partner, more valued for financial than for artistic reasons. She accepted an invitation from David Webster to base her main ballet company at the reopened Covent Garden, opening there in 1946, leaving Sadler's Wells with a small company known as the Sadler's Wells Theatre Ballet. (Note: The main company became the Royal Ballet in 1956. In 1957 the Sadler's Wells company was renamed the Royal Ballet Touring Company, and in 1976 it became Sadler's Wells Royal Ballet. In 1990 the company left Sadler's Wells and moved to Birmingham as the Birmingham Royal Ballet, but has continued to present London seasons at Sadler's Wells.) The previous year the theatre had hosted the world premiere of Benjamin Britten's Peter Grimes and over the next twenty years the opera company gave British premieres of works by Verdi, Janáček, Stravinsky, Weill and others. Britten's ensemble the English Opera Group had London seasons at Sadler's Wells between 1954 and 1975. From 1959 to 1985 the theatre was the main venue for the annual seasons of the Handel Opera Society.

In the 1960s there were plans for a new opera house on the South Bank; Norman Tucker and his successor, Stephen Arlen, the directors of Sadler's Wells Opera, hoped to relocate the company there. The plans fell through when the government declined to contribute to the capital cost of the proposed building, but Arlen remained convinced that Sadler's Wells was too small for productions of large-scale works such as Wagner's Ring cycle, and in 1968 the company left Sadler's Wells and moved to the London Coliseum. (Note: The Coliseum's seating capacity (2,500) was more than 40 per cent greater than that of Sadler's Wells, and the proscenium opening of 55 feet (16.7 metres) – compared with Sadler's Wells's 30 feet (9.1 m) – was the largest in London.) Sadler's Wells turned to dance as its main focus. By the 1970s, the historian Sarah Crompton records, the dance programme of Sadler's Wells had diversified considerably. Among the companies appearing there were the Ballet Rambert and London Contemporary Dance Theatre, who both held residencies there, and visiting ensembles including those of Alvin Ailey and Merce Cunningham, Nederlands Dans Theater and the Dance Theatre of Harlem.

After the opera company moved out, Sadler's Wells hosted operatic productions by, among others, Cologne Opera (1969) and the Camden Festival (1972). In 1983 a new opera company was established, with its base at Sadler's Wells. With a four-year sponsorship from the National Westminster Bank, the New Sadler's Wells Opera company focused on operetta, sung in English, in London and on tour. The first season opened with Lehar's The Count of Luxembourg, followed by Gilbert and Sullivan's The Mikado and Kálmán's Countess Maritza. Later productions included Gilbert and Sullivan's H.M.S. Pinafore, Ruddigore and The Gondoliers, Offenbach's La belle Hélène, Lehár's The Merry Widow and Noël Coward's Bitter Sweet. Most of these productions were commercially recorded and released on LP and CD. After the sponsorship ended, costs outstripped income, and the opera company – though not the theatre – went into liquidation with heavy debts in 1989.

In 1994 a new chief executive, Ian Albery, led a campaign to transform Sadler's Wells into a purpose-built dance theatre. During the two-year rebuilding, Sadler's Wells moved temporarily to the Peacock Theatre in the West End, where it has maintained a presence ever since.

=== Sixth theatre: 1998– ===
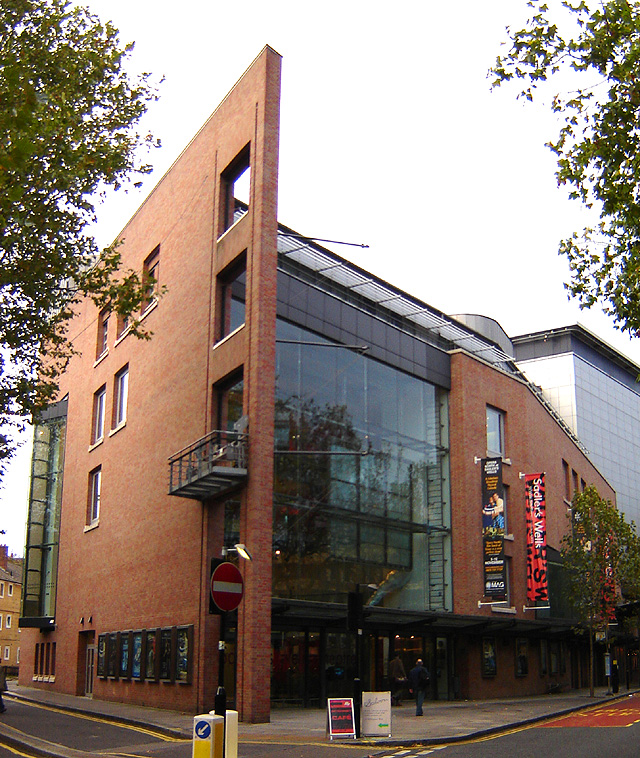
Sixth theatre, seen from the south-west, 2005

The new theatre was designed by the Arts Team division of the architects RHWL. It opened in October 1998 with a design that incorporates the skeleton of the 1931 Chancellor theatre (which itself contained bricks from the Victorian structure). It has an expanded 15 m^{2} sprung stage, a 1,500-seat auditorium, three rehearsal studios and the smaller 200-seat Lilian Baylis studio theatre for the development and presentation of small-scale work. The current building retains the Grade II listing applied to the Matcham theatre in 1950.

The opening season included performances by Pina Bausch's Tanztheater Wuppertal, William Forsythe's Ballett Frankfurt, and Rambert Dance. Operatic productions at the new house have included seasons by the Royal Opera (1999), Welsh National Opera (1999 and 2001), Polish National Opera (2004), Glyndebourne Touring Opera (2007) and English Touring Opera (2010).

In 2004 a new director, Alistair Spalding, concluded that Sadler's Wells "had been at its best when it had had resident companies and new works being created within its walls". He announced:

You've got the National Theatre for drama, English National Opera for opera and I want Sadler's Wells to perform the same function for contemporary dance.

In accordance with this policy Sadler's Wells has appointed an increasing number of choreographers and other associate artists and has commissioned and produced new work. In 2004 Breakin' Convention joined Sadler's Wells, "representing the origins and evolution of hip hop culture through performance and education." The theatre now claims to create and share more new work than any other dance organisation in the world. In the 2020s the theatre has been criticised for its sponsorship by Barclays Bank, which some campaigners associate with investment damaging to the environment.

== Sadler's Wells East ==
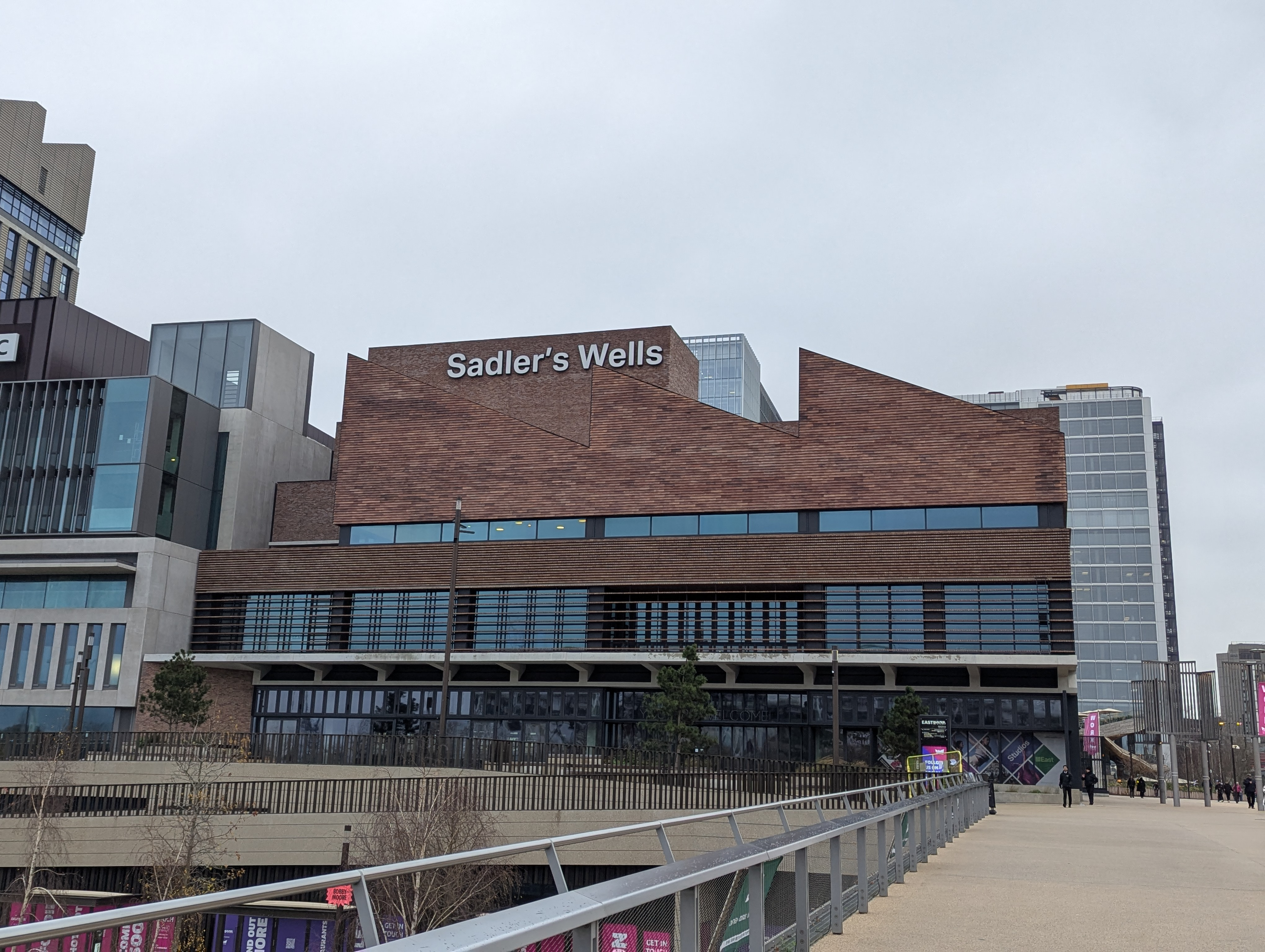
Sadler's Wells East, 2024

In June 2018 Sadiq Khan, the Mayor of London, announced an additional venue Sadler's Wells East Theatre as part of the East Bank project in the Queen Elizabeth Olympic Park Stratford, London and to open in February 2025. The architects were from O'Donnell & Tuomey.

Located in Queen Elizabeth Olympic Park, its focus is on dance. The venue opened on 16 January 2025 and first production was ‘Our Mighty Groove’ by choreographer Vicki Igbokwe-Ozoagu on 6 February 2025. The formal opening was on 6 February 2025.

== In popular culture ==
- Lorna Hill wrote a series of children's fiction in the 1950s and '60s, starting with 'A Dream of Sadlers Wells' (1950), which featured teenage girls learning ballet at Sadler's Wells.
- The play Trelawny of the "Wells" (1898) is set at a theatre named Barridge Wells, based on Sadler's Wells. Two of the characters in the play are modelled on the actress Alice Marriott, co-manager of Sadler's Wells in the 1860s.

== Notes, references and sources ==
=== Sources ===
- Addison, William (1951). English Spas. London: B. T. Batsford. OCLC 422941.
- Allen, Shirley S. (1971). Samuel Phelps and Sadler's Wells Theatre. Middletown: Wesleyan University Press. OCLC 1036847847.
- Arundell, Dennis (1978). The Story of Sadler's Wells, 1683–1977. Newton Abbot: David & Charles. ISBN 978-0-71-537620-1.
- Carey, Hugh (1979). Duet for Two Voices: An Informal Biography of Edward Dent. Cambridge: Cambridge University Press. ISBN 978-0-52-122312-6.
- Craine, Debra; Judith Mackrell (2010). The Oxford Dictionary of Dance (second ed.). Oxford: Oxford University Press. ISBN 978-0-19-956344-9.
- Gaye, Freda, ed. (1967). Who's Who in the Theatre (fourteenth ed.). London: Sir Isaac Pitman and Sons. OCLC 5997224.
- Gilbert, Susie (2009). Opera for Everybody: The Story of English National Opera. London: Faber and Faber. ISBN 978-0-571-22493-7.
- Haltrecht, Montague (1975). The Quiet Showman: Sir David Webster and the Royal Opera House. London: Collins. ISBN 978-0-00-211163-8.
- Hembry, Phyllis (1990). The English Spa, 1560–1815: A Social History. London: London University Press. ISBN 978-0-48-511374-7.
- Highfill, Philip; Kalman Burnim; Edward Langhans (1973). A Biographical Dictionary of Actors, Actresses, Musicians, Dancers, Managers & Other Stage Personnel in London, 1660–1800. Vol. 5. Carbondale: Southern Illinois University Press. OCLC 1000937503.
- Holden, Amanda, ed. (1997). The Penguin Opera Guide. London: Penguin. ISBN 978-0-14-051385-1.
- Jarman, Richard (1974). A History of Sadler's Wells Opera. London: English National Opera. ISBN 978-0-95-036810-8.
- Law, Jonathan (2013). The Methuen Drama Dictionary of the Theatre. London: Methuen Drama. ISBN 978-1-40-813147-3.
- Lay, M. G (1999). Ways of the World: A History of the World's Roads. Brunswick: Rutgers University Press. ISBN 978-0-81-351758-2.
- Parker, John, ed. (1939). Who's Who in the Theatre (ninth ed.). London: Sir Isaac Pitman and Sons. OCLC 473894893.
- Pinks, William John; Edward J. Wood (1881). The History of Clerkenwell (second ed.). London: Herbert. OCLC 1107606811.
- Rendell, Mike (2022). Georgian Harlots and Whores: Fame, Fashion & Fortune. Barnsley: Pen and Sword. ISBN 978-1-52-679102-3.
- Rice, Paul (2010). British Music and the French Revolution. Newcastle: Cambridge Scholars. ISBN 978-1-44-382110-0.
- Rollins, Cyril; R. John Witts (1962). The D'Oyly Carte Opera Company in Gilbert and Sullivan Operas: A Record of Productions, 1875–1961. London: Michael Joseph. With four supplements, published 1966–1983. OCLC 504581419
- Sappa, Cristiana; Enrico Bonadio (2022). The Subjects of Literary and Artistic Copyright. Northampton, Massachusetts: Edward Elgar Publishing. ISBN 978-1-80-088176-1.
- Schafer, Elizabeth (2007). Lilian Baylis: A Biography. Hatfield: University of Hertfordshire Press. ISBN 978-1-90-280664-8.
- Temple, Philip. Survey of London: Volume XLVII: Northern Clerkenwell and Pentonville. New Haven and London: Yale University Press and English Heritage. ISBN 978-0-30-013937-2.
- Thomson, Peter (2006). The Cambridge Introduction to English Theatre, 1660–1900. Cambridge and New York: Cambridge University Press. ISBN 978-0-52-183925-9.
- Urban, Silvanus (1784). Gentleman's Magazine and Historical Chronicle 1784, part 2. London: D. Henry. OCLC 7607917.
