= Samuel Phelps =

British actor (1804–1878)

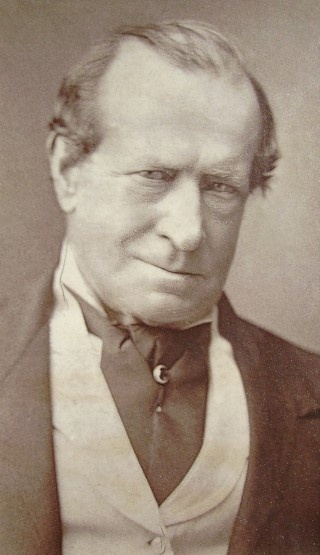
Phelps, 1870s

Samuel Phelps (13 February 1804 – 6 November 1878) was an English actor-manager. He is known for reviving the fortunes of the neglected Sadler's Wells Theatre and for his productions of Shakespeare's plays which were presented with attention to period detail and dramatic veracity, and used texts purged of 18th-century alterations and additions.

Stage-struck from an early age, Phelps performed as an amateur before becoming a professional actor in 1826. Working his way up in provincial companies he graduated from small supporting parts to leading roles, making his London début as Shylock in The Merchant of Venice in 1839. From 1844 to 1862 he ran Sadler's Wells, presenting all but four of Shakespeare's plays as well as those of dramatists from the Renaissance to the current period.

As an actor, Phelps was widely seen as a good, but not a great, tragedian; his performances in comic roles including Falstaff in Henry IV, Part 1 and Part 2 and The Merry Wives of Windsor, and Bottom in A Midsummer Night's Dream received widespread praise.

== Life and career ==
=== Early years ===
Samuel Phelps was the seventh child and second son of Robert Phelps and his wife Ann, daughter of Captain Mark Turner. Phelps was born on 13 February 1804, in what is now called Devonport, but was then known as Plymouth Dock. He was educated at a local school and then at a classical school at Saltash, Cornwall. Unlike his younger brother Robert – a fine mathematician who became master of Sidney Sussex College, Cambridge – Phelps was not academically inclined and he developed a strong desire to go on the stage. The family was well connected and prosperous, and Phelps's father provided him with opportunities to visit London, where a cousin who was a dramatic critic frequently took him to the theatre. During the season of 1814–15 the family spent several months in London, and Phelps saw celebrated actors including John Philip Kemble, Charles Kemble, Charles Young and Edmund Kean.

Orphaned at the age of sixteen, Phelps became a junior proofreader on a local newspaper, and acted in amateur productions in the evenings. A year later he moved to London, hoping to find work in a theatre. Failing to do so, he worked as a proofreader for The Globe, and then The Sun. With Douglas Jerrold and W. E. Love, two colleagues from the papers, he formed an amateur theatrical group, performing at a small theatre in Islington, giving up to three performances a week.

=== Professional actor ===
As Hamlet, late 1830s

Phelps turned professional in 1826, in which year he married the sixteen-year-old Sarah Cooper. It was a happy, lifelong marriage; they had three sons and three daughters. From 1826 to 1837 Phelps built up a career in the provinces, beginning with small, meagrely-paid parts and gradually moving up to leading roles. (Note: According to the theatre historian Shirley Allen, Phelps's first professional engagement was reportedly at Pontefract, appearing in Macbeth as six different characters: the Third Witch, Duncan, the First Murderer, Ross, one of the apparitions, and the servant whom Macbeth addresses as "thou cream-fac'd loon".) His biographer J. P. Wearing comments, "his early career was a catalogue of numerous towns and of roles growing gradually in importance". Among the towns where Phelps played, Wearing lists Hull, Sheffield, Leeds, Preston, Perth, Dundee, Aberdeen, Inverness and Belfast, and his roles as Malcolm (Macbeth), Benvolio (Romeo and Juliet), the Ghost (Hamlet), Macduff (Macbeth), Claudius (Hamlet), and the title role in Julius Caesar. From these, he moved up to the leading roles in King Lear, Macbeth, Othello and The Merchant of Venice, playing in theatres in southern England. In 1836 a London critic wrote:

Among the favourites at the Provincial Theatres there is none, perhaps, spoken more highly of than Mr Phelps, who is now playing a series of tragic parts at Exeter. The Exeter Flying Post, in speaking of that gentleman, states "that he is beyond all question superior to any one who has formed part of the company since the late Edmund Kean"; and in alluding to his personation of Brutus, the writer remarks, that "a more chastened and masterly piece of acting could not often have been seen".

In 1837 Phelps received offers of West End engagements from two rival actor-managers: Benjamin Webster at the Theatre Royal Haymarket and William Macready at the Theatre Royal, Covent Garden. The Western Times reported:

Mr Phelps – This gifted actor played Sir Edward Mortimer, (Note: In The Iron Chest by George Colman the Younger.) at Southampton, on Monday, with the highest success. Mr Macready was in the house, and after witnessing the performance, tendered Mr Phelps an engagement for Covent Garden. Mr Macready, with the generosity of a high-minded man, was not slow to recognize the merits of his brother tragedian, and expressed himself in a manner totally free from anything like professional jealousy, and highly honourable to him as a man.

This turned out to be an overestimate of Macready's magnanimity. After Phelps made a successful London début, starring as Shylock in Webster's production of The Merchant of Venice, and then playing Hamlet, Othello and Richard III at the Haymarket, he moved to Covent Garden, where he remained from 1837 to 1839. Macready, finding himself equalled and even outshone by Phelps, soon restricted him to secondary supporting roles such as Antonio in The Tempest, and the Constable of France in Henry V. (Note: Macready recorded in his diary for 29 August 1837: "Sent for the Morning Herald and read the account of Mr Phelps' appearance, which seems to me a decided success. It depressed my spirits, though perhaps it should not do so. If he is greatly successful, I shall reap the profits; if moderately, he will strengthen my company. But an actor's fame and his dependent income is so precarious, that we start at every shadow of an actor. It is an unhappy life!". Phelps later said that if his and Macready's places had been reversed, he would probably have behaved as Macready did.) After his contract with Macready expired, Phelps played at the Haymarket and the Theatre Royal, Drury Lane between 1840 and 1843.

=== Sadler's Wells ===
In 1843 a change in English law relaxed the restrictions on London theatres that had been in force since the Restoration. Before the Theatres Act 1843, only the officially licensed Patent Theatre companies were allowed to stage serious, spoken drama. Other theatre companies were restricted to opera, comedy, pantomime and melodrama.

Phelps became the first to take advantage of the change in the law. Thomas Greenwood, the lessee of Sadler's Wells Theatre in Islington, approached him with a proposal to run the theatre, staging serious drama. Together with a leading actress, Mary Warner, Phelps took on the management of the house. According to a historian writing forty years later, Sadler's Wells was then "dilapidated and almost forgotten". It had the advantages of a large capacity (2,500) and a low rent, and the disadvantages of a location far away from the West End, and a local Islington audience, largely working class and poorly educated. Phelps's biographer Joseph Knight writes, "while the poetical drama was at its lowest ebb in the theatres of the west end [Phelps] succeeded in ... 'making Shakespeare pay' for nearly twenty years". Knight adds that Phelps was an intelligent and spirited manager, and that Sadler's Wells became "a recognised home of the higher drama, and, to some extent, a training school for actors". Among the players in Phelps's company were Laura Addison, George Bennett, Fanny Cooper and Isabella Glyn.

As Macbeth, 1850

The new management opened on 27 May 1844, with a production of Macbeth, with Phelps in the title role and Warner as Lady Macbeth. In the programme for the opening night, Phelps wrote:

Mrs Warner and Mr Phelps embarked in the management and performances of Sadler’s Wells Theatre, in the hope of eventually rendering it what a theatre ought to be – a place for justly representing the works of our great dramatic poets. [...] Each separate division of an immense metropolis, with its 2,000,000 inhabitants can have its own well-conducted theatre within a reasonable distance of the home of its patrons. For the North of London, they offer an entertainment selected from the first stock drama in the world, reinforced by such novelties as can be produced by diligence and liberality ... and a Company of acknowledged talent. These attractions are placed in a theatre where all can see and hear, and at a price fairly within the habitual means of all.

During his eighteen years in charge of Sadler's Wells – fifteen in sole charge, after Warner left at the end of the third season – Phelps produced more than 1,600 performances of thirty-one of Shakespeare's plays, as well as many plays dating from the Renaissance to the mid-nineteenth century. (Note: Phelps did not present Henry VI, Titus Andronicus, Richard II, or Troilus and Cressida.) By the standards of the time, Phelps was rigorous in his approach to Shakespeare's texts. He cut all the textual accretions, by Colly Cibber and others, to which the theatregoing public had been accustomed for more than a century. Although, as was then customary – and has to some extent remained so (Note: An uncut performance of Hamlet plays for nearly five hours and is infrequently attempted. The first such performance is believed to have been as late as 1899. According to the director Michael Blakemore his uncut production of the play in the 1970s was the first such in London since the 1930s.) – he cut many of Shakespeare's lines, he cut those of his own characters as readily as he cut those of others', and unlike other actor-managers (then and later) he did not build up the star parts at the expense of the supporting ones. Care was taken to ensure that scenery and costuming were historically accurate and enhanced the play rather than being merely spectacular.

After he played Bottom in A Midsummer Night's Dream, The Athenaeum said of him, "We have been sometimes tempted to think that if Mr Phelps had early taken to comedy, and particularly to what are technically termed character parts, he would have accomplished a more profitable reputation than that he now enjoys as a tragedian." And of his performance in Twelfth Night the same journal said, "The Malvolio of Mr Phelps is a part by which he will be remembered. The making up is so complete that the actor's person cannot be identified until he speaks. The execution of the part is equally complete; elaborately finished – thoroughly carried out to the minutest particular."

In the spring of 1859 Phelps and his Sadler's Wells company played a series of engagements in Berlin, Leipzig, and Hamburg. This was the first English touring company to appear in Germany since the seventeenth century. British critics had long observed that one of the characteristics of Phelps's acting style – contrasting with those of Kean and Macready – was his ability to express intensity and depth of emotion without resorting to unnatural vehemence and overt theatricality. The German critics were similarly impressed – one praised his "psychological truthfulness" as Macbeth – but they were at least as impressed by Phelps as a director and the unobtrusive naturalness of his productions.

Greenwood retired as the company's business manager in 1861; Phelps found the strain of running the theatre single-handed, at a time when his wife was gravely ill, too much, and in March 1862 he resigned.

=== Last years ===
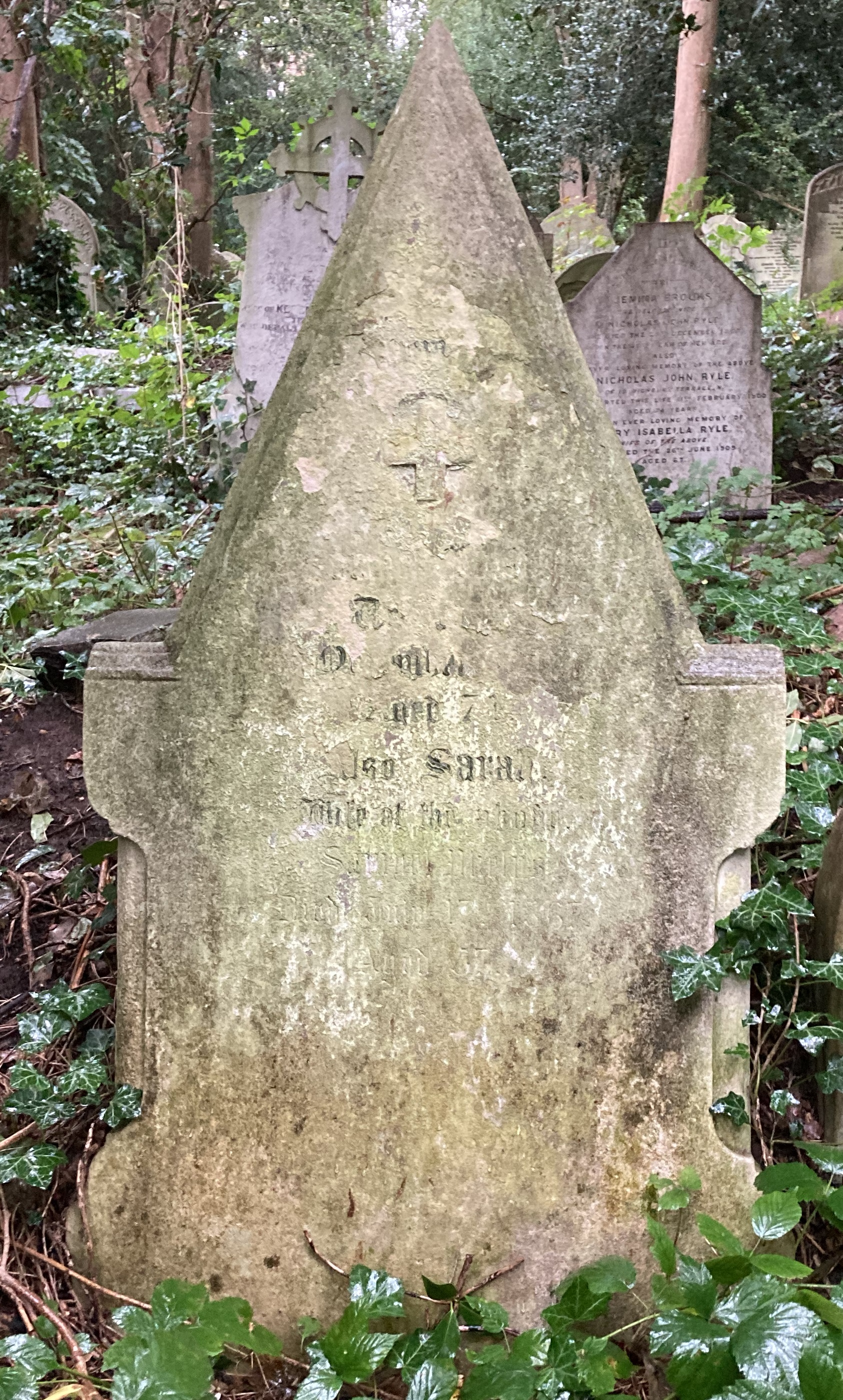
Phelps's grave in Highgate Cemetery

Phelps accepted an offer from Charles Fechter to join the latter's company at the Lyceum Theatre, but the collaboration was an unhappy one, and in 1863 he joined F. B. Chatterton and Edmund Falconer at Drury Lane, where he remained for seven years, successfully reprising many of his old parts and adding the title role in Byron's Manfred (1863), Mephistopheles in Faust (1866), and the Doge in Bayle Bernard's The Doge of Venice (1867).

Phelps's wife and eldest son both died in 1867, and his actor son, Edmund, died in 1870 at the age of thirty-two. Phelps continued to act, touring in the provinces and playing in the West End. In 1874 the impresario John Hollingshead invited Phelps to play Falstaff in a rare revival of The Merry Wives of Windsor at the Gaiety Theatre, London, heading a starry cast that included Rose Leclercq and Mrs John Wood as the merry wives, Teresa Furtado as Anne, Hermann Vezin as Ford and Arthur Cecil as Dr Caius. The notices were excellent; The Illustrated London News commented, "His Falstaff is a thoroughly original performance, possessed of life and individuality, and presenting throughout an exhibition of dry humour that irresistibly excites the risible faculties of the audience. The identity of the actor is entirely lost in the impersonation, and we have before us the real living Falstaff as Shakspeare [sic] drew him, and not merely an ingenious counterfeit in the person of a well-known popular comedian".

A succession of colds weakened Phelps and he died at a sanatorium near Epping on 6 November 1878, aged 74. He was buried, alongside his wife, at Highgate Cemetery on 13 November 1878.

== Notes, references and sources ==
=== Sources ===
- Allen, Shirley (1971). Samuel Phelps and Sadler's Wells Theatre. Middletown: Wesleyan University Press. ISBN 978-0-8195-4029-4. OCLC 1036847847.
- Blakemore, Michael (2013). Stage Blood. London: Faber and Faber. ISBN 978-0-571-24137-8. OCLC 1280720825.
- Coleman, John (1886). Memoirs of Samuel Phelps. London: Remington. OCLC 5636523.
- Engle, Ronald G; Daniel J. Watermeier (October 1972). "Phelps and His German Critics". Educational Theatre Journal. 24 (3): 237–247. doi:10.2307/3205893. JSTOR 3205893. (subscription required)
- Levin, Bernard (1985) [1983]. Enthusiasms. London: Coronet. ISBN 0-340-36927-2.
- May Phelps, William; John Forbes-Robertson (1886). The Life and Life-work of Samuel Phelps. London: Sampson Low, Marston, Searle & Rivington. OCLC 2280361.
- Pascoe, Charles Eyre (1879). The Dramatic List. London: Hardwicke and Bogue. OCLC 4283917.
- Sappa, Cristiana; Enrico Bonadio (2022). The Subjects of Literary and Artistic Copyright. Northampton, Massachusetts: Elgar. ISBN 978-1-80-088176-1.
