= Western Times =

Western Times may refer to:

- Western Times (Exeter), a newspaper published in Exeter, Devon, England from 1829 to 1952
- The Bathurst Free Press and Mining Journal, published in Bathurst, New South Wales, Australia, as the Western Times between 1936 and 1963
