= The Patrician's Daughter =

1842 play

- Original language: English
- Written by: John Westland Marston
- Genre: Tragedy
- Setting: England, present day

Premiere
- Date: 10 December 1842
- Place: Theatre Royal, Drury Lane, London

The Patrician's Daughter is an 1842 tragedy by the British writer John Westland Marston. It premiered at the Theatre Royal, Drury Lane on 10 December 1842. The original cast included William Macready as Mordaunt, Samuel Phelps as the Earl of Lynterne, Edward William Elton as Heartwell, George John Bennett as Lister, Charles Selby as Lord Chatterly, Morris Barnett as Sir Archer Taunton, John Ryder as Physician, George Yarnold as Solicitor, Mary Warner as Lady Lydia Lynterne and Helena Faucit as Lady Mabel Lynterne.

== Bibliography ==
- Downer, Alan Seymour. The Eminent Tragedian William Charles Macready. Harvard University Press, 1966.
- Nicoll, Allardyce. A History of Early Nineteenth Century Drama 1800-1850. Cambridge University Press, 1930.
