= Addison (given name) =

- Gender: Unisex
- Language: English, Scottish

Origin
- Word/name: Scotland
- Meaning: son of Adam

Other names
- Nicknames: Addie, Addy, Add

Addison is a unisex given name derived from the surname Addison. It has increased in use in the Anglosphere in recent years, perhaps due to its similarity to the fashionable name Madison. The name was also used for characters such as Addison Montgomery on the popular American television series Grey’s Anatomy.

== People ==
=== A ===
- Addison Alves (born 1981), Brazilian footballer

=== B ===
- Addison Bain (1935–2025), American NASA scientist
- Addison Baker (1907–1943), American pilot
- Addison Barger (born 1999), American baseball player
- Addison Brown (1830–1913), American judge
- Addison Burkhardt (1879–1937), American lyricist

=== C ===
- Addison Caldwell (1856–1910), American teacher
- Addison Clark (1842–1911), American academic administrator
- Addison B. Colvin (1858–1939), American businessman
- Addison Cresswell (disambiguation), multiple people

=== D ===
- Addison Dale (born 1942), Zimbabwean weightlifter

=== F ===
- Addison Farmer (1928–1963), American musician
- Addison Fatta (born 2004), American artistic gymnast
- Addison Fischer, American businessman
- Addison G. Foster (1837–1917), American politician

=== G ===
- Addison Gardiner (1797–1883), American lawyer and politician
- Addison Garnett (born 1996), English footballer
- Addison Gayle (1932–1991), American professor
- Addison Grace (born 2001), American singer-songwriter
- Addison Groove (born 1942), English musical artist

=== H ===
- Addison C. Harris (1840–1916), American lawyer
- Addison Hehr (1909–1971), American art director
- Addison Hewlett (1912–1989), American politician
- Addison J. Hodges (1842–1933), American soldier
- Addison Holley (born 2000), Canadian actress
- Addison Hosea (1914–1985), American prelate
- Addison Hutton (1834–1916), American architect

=== J ===
- Addison James (1849–1910), American politician
- Addison P. Jones (1822–1910), American politician

=== K ===
- Addison Kelly (1875–1942), American football player
- Addison Kimball, American architect

=== L ===
- Addison H. Laflin (1823–1878), American politician
- Addison Lockley (born 1991), English rugby union footballer

=== M ===
- Addison S. McClure (1839–1903), American lawyer and politician
- Addison W. Merrill (1842–1920), American politician
- Addison Mizner (1872–1933), American architect
- Addison Webster Moore (1866–1930), American philosopher
- Addison Mitchell McConnell (born 1942), American lawyer and politician
- Adison Mwalili (born 2008), Kenyan

=== N ===
- Addison Niles (1832–1890), American judge
- Addison H. Nordyke, American industrialist

=== O ===
- Addison O'Dea (born 1979), American filmmaker

=== P ===
- Addison Powell (1921–2010), American actor
- Addison Pratt (1802–1872), American missionary
- Addison G. Pulsifer (1874–??), American architect

=== R ===
- Addison Rae (born 2000), American social media personality, singer and actress
- Addison Reed (born 1988), American baseball player
- Addison Rerecich (1999–2019), American social figure
- Addison Richards (1902–1964), American actor
- Addison Richards (Canadian football) (born 1993), Canadian football player
- Addison Roache (1817–1906), American judge
- Addison Russell (born 1994), American baseball player
- Addison Peale Russell (1826–1912), American author

=== S ===
- Addison N. Scurlock (1883–1964), American photographer
- Addison T. Smith (1862–1956), American politician
- Addison E. Southard (1884–1970), American diplomat
- Addison Spruill (born 1993), American basketball player
- Addison Langhorne Steavenson (1836–1913), English engineer
- Addison Steiner (born 1994), American soccer player

=== T ===
- Addison Teague, American sound editor
- Addison Timlin (born 1991), American actress

=== V ===
- Addison Van Name (1835–1922), American librarian
- Addison Emery Verrill (1839–1926), American zoologist

=== W ===
- Addison West (born 2000), American football player
- Addison White (1824–1909), American politician
- Addison Wiggin, American publisher
- Addison Wilson, Canadian Lawyer

== Fictional characters ==
- Addison Montgomery, on the television series Grey's Anatomy
- Addison Wells, main character in the Zombies franchise

== See also ==
- Addison (disambiguation)
- Addison (surname)
