= Thomas Latimer =

Thomas Latimer may refer to:

- Thomas Latimer, 1st Baron Latimer (died 1334), English noble
- Thomas Latimer (journalist) (1803-1888), English journalist in Exeter
- Thomas E. Latimer (1879–1937), American politician and lawyer from Minneapolis
- Thom Latimer (born 1986), English professional wrestler and actor
