= PS Pegasus =

Former paddle steamer of the United Kingdom

Coordinates: 55.654°N 1.719°W

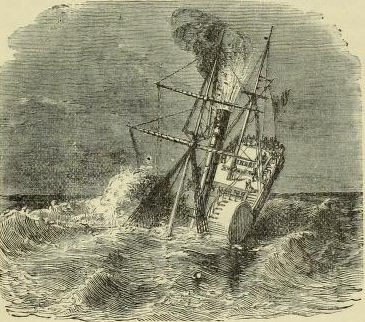
- Pegasus sinking

History

United Kingdom
- Name: PS Pegasus
- Operator: Hull and Leith Steam Packet Company
- Builder: Robert Barclay & Co
- Launched: 5 December 1835
- Fate: Wrecked, 20 July 1843

General characteristics
- Length: 132 feet 4 inches (40.34 m)
- Beam: 39 feet (12 m)

PS Pegasus, was a sea-going paddle steamer launched in Glasgow, Scotland, in December 1836. The ship was owned by the Hull & Leith Steam Packet Company, working a route between the two ports of Hull and Leith on a weekly basis. She sank after striking a rock on 20 July, close to the Farne Islands.

== History ==
Pegasus was launched in December 1835 at the yard of Robert Barclay and Co. in Stobcross, Glasgow. She was registered on the last day of 1835, and became part of the Hull & Leith Shipping Company, later the Hull & Leith Steam Packet Company. After sea trials, her first trip was to get to her new home port of Leith from the Glasgow area. Some smaller ships could use the Forth and Clyde Canal, whilst larger vessels could use the Caledonian Canal. However, Pegasus was too large for either of these waterways, and she had to sail right around the coast of Scotland to get to Leith. She arrived at Leith on 6 February 1836, and the company made great use of her sailing through difficult waters announcing:

The passage round the north... served one purpose effectively – the proving of her capabilities as a seaboat in the hardest weather that blows. So stormy a period as that which she has just weathered is of rare occurrence, and her speed and power have been most satisfactorily demonstrated.

Her first trip between the Leith and Hull was in February 1836, and she continued to ply this route right up until her sinking. Her regular sequence was to call in at ports on the way (such as Whitby and Scarborough), with the journey taking around 24 hours. She would sail from Leith on a Saturday, and return from Hull on a Wednesday, but exact timings were dependent on the tides. Much was made in the press about her ability to cover the distance between the two ports in such a short space of time. One report, which mentions the various ports that she also called in at, labelled her 24-hour journey as an "unprecedented" time.

Thereafter, she suffered from several accidents; in August 1836, on one sailing from Leith to Hull, she struck a rock "..nearly opposite Bamborough Castle[sic]". She left the Port of Hull on 7 September 1838, at the same time as the Forfarshire, and another steam ship Innisfail, at 6:20 pm. The Forfarshire pulled ahead after leaving port, being a more powerful ship, which left at least one passenger on Pegasus wishing he was on the other ship instead. However, after Spurn Point, they lost sight of each other, and during the passage through the Farne Islands, the Forfarshire sunk, resulting in the loss of 43 lives, and bringing attention to the heroics of Grace and William Darling. Those on board the Pegasus were unaware of the Forfarshire's fate until they arrived in Leith at 02:00 am, with Innisfail arriving three hours later. In December 1838, Pegasus became stuck on Salt scar Rocks, off the coast of Redcar. She was able to float off at high tide and put into Hartlepool for repairs.

On 1 May 1839, the ship was lost in fog as she approached the Firth of Forth on a sailing north from Hull, and even though the captain slowed to half-speed, and took depth soundings, she was still adrift of her intended location when she struck a rock off the Fife coast. However, she was able to be beached and alternative arrangements were made to transport her passengers and goods to Leith.

== Loss ==
On 19 July 1843, the Pegasus left the Port of Leith bound for the Port of Hull. Sources are conflicted on her time of departure, which was sometime between 5:40 pm and 6:30 pm. Also in conflict is the number of people on board; most agree on 57, but the composition of crew, passengers, and class of passenger, have had differing reports. She had between 14 and 16 crew, 20 cabin passengers, and the rest were steerage, including some members of the 96th Foot. Between 12:20 and 12:30 am on the morning of 20 July, the ship struck Goldstone Rock, some 70 miles (110 km) south of Leith, as she was passing between the Farne Islands and the mainland.

After striking the rock, the captain ordered the engines into reverse, with the hope of making to the shore before she sank. However, the ship was quickly inundated with water and it sank in 10 fathoms (60 ft; 18 m) of water, about 3 miles (4.8 km) away from the mainland. The two lifeboats were lowered during the confusion of the sinking, but both were swamped with water. The first mate had talked with the captain at this time, and the captain was upset at the launching of the lifeboats without his knowledge or guidance. The mate stated that the captain's last words were "Alas, alas, we are all going to the bottom." At 5:00 am of 20 July, the paddle steamer Martello arrived at the scene of the sinking and picked up some survivors as well as at least six bodies. After staying at the scene for several hours, the Martello sailed to Leith and took the bodies with her, as well as the survivors, two of whom, Bailey (or Baillie) and Hildyard, were passengers. The other four survivors were from her crew; the mate, the engineer, the carpenter and one seaman. One of those who drowned, was the renowned 19th-century actor Edward William Elton. After his death was announced, several appeals to raise money for his family were launched, which had Charles Dickens in an overseer role.

== Aftermath ==
Questions were later asked why a ship, on a clear night sailing through the Inner Passage of the Farne Islands, could strike a rock given that she had plied that route almost weekly for the last seven years. A coroners' inquest was held in August 1843 at Leith, which apportioned compensation to families of those who died, and a lesser payment for those who lost freight cargo. In November 1843, a bottle was washed ashore in the Netherlands which contained the following message:

Pegasus steamer, to Fern Islands, (Note: The Farne Islands were listed in newspapers reports of the day as either the Fern or Ferne Islands.) night of Wednesday, July 19th, 1843. In great distress; struck upon hidden rock. On board fifty-five persons, vessel must go down, and no Grace Darling.

PS Martello, the sister ship of Pegasus that rescued some of the survivors, was herself wrecked on rocks 14 years later. She was lost on Carr Rocks in the Firth of Forth on 28 November 1857 due to "inaccurate steering in heavy weather".
