= Mary Warner =

English actress and theatre manager

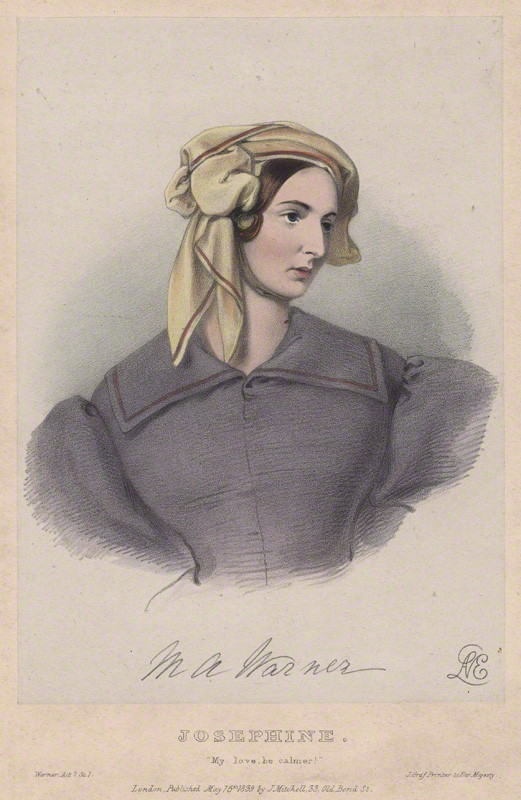
Mary Amelia Warner, in character as Josephine in Werner

Mary Amelia Warner (née Huddart; 1804–1854), best known by her stage name Mrs Warner, was an English actress and theatre manager.

== Life ==
Warner was born in Manchester in 1804 to Thomas Huddart, a chemist from Dublin, and his wife, Ann née Gough of Limerick. Her father had acted at the Crow Street Theatre in Dublin.

After playing at Greenwich for her father's benefit, Mary Huddart became at the reputed age of fifteen a member of Brunton's company at Plymouth, Exeter, Bristol, and Birmingham. In 1829 she was acting in Dublin.

== On the London stage ==
On 22 November 1830, as Miss Huddart from Dublin, she appeared at Drury Lane Theatre, playing Belvidera in Venice Preserved to the Pierre of William Macready, to whose recommendation she owed her engagement by the managers Polhill and Lee. She had previously been seen in London at the Surrey and Tottenham Street theatres. She then returned to Dublin, and played leading business under Calcraft.

In 1836, under Alfred Bunn's management, Mary Huddart was again at Drury Lane, where she supported Edwin Forrest as Lady Macbeth, Emilia, and other characters, and was the original Marian in Sheridan Knowles's The Wrecker's Daughter: her success in it led to her engagement at the Haymarket for the first production in London of The Bridal, an adaptation by Knowles of The Maid's Tragedy. In this she played on 26 June 1837 Evadne, opposite Macready as Melantius. She also played Portia to Samuel Phelps's Shylock, and Helen McGregor to his Rob Roy. At about this period she married.

In the autumn of 1837 Mrs. Warner joined Macready at Covent Garden Theatre, where she stayed two years, supporting him in many Shakespearean parts and building a reputation. She was the original Joan of Arc in Thomas James Serle's play of the name. She had been prevented by illness from playing at Covent Garden the heroine of Thomas Noon Talfourd's The Athenian Captive, but took the part at the Haymarket on 4 August 1838.

Warner accompanied Macready to Drury Lane, and was on 29 April 1842 the Queen in Hamlet, and on 10 December the original Lady Lydia Lynterne in Westland Marston's The Patrician's Daughter. In 1843 she acted with Samuel Phelps in Bath, and on 27 May 1844, with him and T. L. Greenwood, began the management of Sadler's Wells, opening as Lady Macbeth, and speaking an address by Serle.

Warner then retired from the management of Sadler's Wells, and took on that of the Marylebone Theatre, which opened on 30 September 1847 with The Winter's Tale. She took on parts such as Julia in The Hunchback (Knowles), Lady Teazle, and Lady Townley in The Provoked Husband (John Vanburgh and Colley Cibber) for which her years began to disqualify her. She revived in November The Scornful Lady, adapted by Serle, playing in it the Lady; and in April 1848 The Double Marriage, again in Serle's adaptation.

== Emigration ==
Retiring with a financial loss, Warner supported Macready at the Haymarket during his farewell performances. On 28 July 1851 Sadler's Wells was opened for a few nights before the beginning of the regular season, to give her an opportunity of playing her best known characters before starting for America. What proved to be her last appearance in England was made in August as Mrs. Oakley in The Jealous Wife. She met with great success in America.

Signs of cancer showing themselves, Warner came to England, underwent an operation, and revisited New York. Unable to fulfil her engagements, she returned to London an invalid.

== Last years ==
On 10 December 1853, in part through her husband's fault, Warner went through the insolvency court. A fund, to which the Queen and Angela Burdett-Coutts contributed, was raised, and a benefit was run at Sadler's Wells. Charge of her children, a boy and a girl, was taken respectively by Macready and Burdett-Coutts.

After enduring a prolonged agony, Warner died on 24 September 1854 at 16 Euston Place, Euston Square and was buried on the western side of Highgate Cemetery in a grave (no.6111) which no longer has a readable inscription.

In public esteem as an actress she was surpassed in her time only by Helen Faucit and Mrs. Charles Kean.

== Family ==
Around 1837 Mary Huddart married Robert William Warner, the landlord of the Wrekin Tavern, Broad Court, Bow Street, frequented by actors and literary men.

== Notes ==
Attribution

This article incorporates text from a publication now in the public domain: Lee, Sidney, ed. (1899). "Warner, Mary Amelia". Dictionary of National Biography. Vol. 59. London: Smith, Elder & Co.
