= The Bridal =

1837 play

- Original language: English
- Written by: James Sheridan Knowles
- Genre: Tragedy

Premiere
- Date: 26 June 1837
- Place: Haymarket Theatre, London

The Bridal is an 1837 tragedy by the Irish writer James Sheridan Knowles. It premiered at the Theatre Royal, Haymarket in London's West End on 26 June 1837 with a cast that included William Macready as Melantius, Edward William Elton as Amintor, Charles Selby as Calianaz and Mary Huddart as Evadne. It is inspired by the Jacobean play The Maid's Tragedy by Francis Beaumont and John Fletcher. In 1843 it appeared at the Park Theatre in New York with Macready reprising his role.

== Bibliography ==
- Burwick, Frederck Goslee, Nancy Moore & Hoeveler Diane Long . The Encyclopaedia of Romantic Literature. John Wiley & Sons, 2012.
- Nicoll, Allardyce. A History of Early Nineteenth Century Drama 1800-1850. Cambridge University Press, 1930.
