= Thomas Latimer (journalist) =

British journalist (1803–1888)

Thomas Latimer JP
- Born: 9 August 1803; Bristol, England
- Died: 5 January 1888 (aged 84)
- Occupation: Journalist

Thomas Latimer JP (9 August 1803 – 5 January 1888) was a British journalist and campaigner.

== Life and career ==
Born in Bristol but raised mostly in London, Latimer left London for Exeter in 1827. The same year he took up his first job as a reporter for the Devonshire Chronicle and Exeter News. Within a few years, he became editor of the Western Times, which he strengthened into a force against corruption and injustice. Under his leadership, the paper gained a reputation for 'championing the yeoman and working man'.

While serving as editor of the Exeter and Plymouth Gazette, Latimer formed a lifelong friendship with Charles Dickens.

Latimer became known nationally for his political struggle with the Bishop of Exeter, Henry Phillpotts. When the Bishop charged Latimer with criminal libel, Alexander Cockburn QC defended him without a fee on the basis that what Latimer had said in his criticisms of the Bishop had been true; Latimer was acquitted.

In addition to his career as a journalist, Latimer became an Exeter councillor, an overseer of the poor and an improvement commissioner. In 1851, he was appointed a Justice of the Peace.

Latimer was a well-known walker, once walking the 170 miles from London to Exeter in three days.
