= William Addison =

William Addison may refer to:

- William Addison (physician) (1803–1881), British physician
- William Addison (VC) (1883–1962), holder of the Victoria Cross
- William Addison, 4th Viscount Addison (born 1945), British Conservative peer
- William Addison (chess player) (1933–2008), American chess master
- William Fountaine Addison (1817–1893), clergyman, Canon of Gibraltar, father of Robert Brydges Addison
- William Grylls Addison (1853–1904), English landscape painter, brother of Robert Brydges Addison
- William Wilkinson Addison (1905–1992), English historian and jurist
- Will Addison (born 1992), English-born Irish rugby union player
