= Alexander Addison =

Alexander Addison may refer to:

- Alexander Addison (cricketer) (1877–1935), Australian cricketer
- Alexander Addison (judge) (1758–1807), American judge in Pennsylvania
