= Addison Road =

Addison Road may refer to:

== Places ==
- Addison Road, London, a road in London, England
  - Addison Road railway station (England), an Underground and Overground station more commonly called Kensington (Olympia) station
- Addison Road, Marrickville, a road in the inner-western Sydney suburb of Marrickville, Australia
- Addison Road station, a Washington Metro station in Prince George's County, Maryland

== Other uses ==
- Addison Road (band), an American Christian alternative pop/rock band
  - Addison Road (album)

== See also ==
- Addison station (disambiguation)

== See also ==
- Addiston Road, former grounds of Harchester United F.C.
