= Walter Addison =

Walter Addison may refer to:

- Walter Dulany Addison (1769–1848), Episcopal clergyman and Chaplain of the United States Senate
- Walter E. Addison (1863–1925), American lawyer and politician
