= Henry Addison =

Henry Addison may refer to:

- Henry Addison (VC) (1821–1887), English soldier and recipient of the Victoria Cross
- Henry Addison (mayor) (1798–1870), American politician and merchant
- Henry Robert Addison (1805–1876), English writer
