= Agnes Addison =

New Zealand draper (1842–1903)

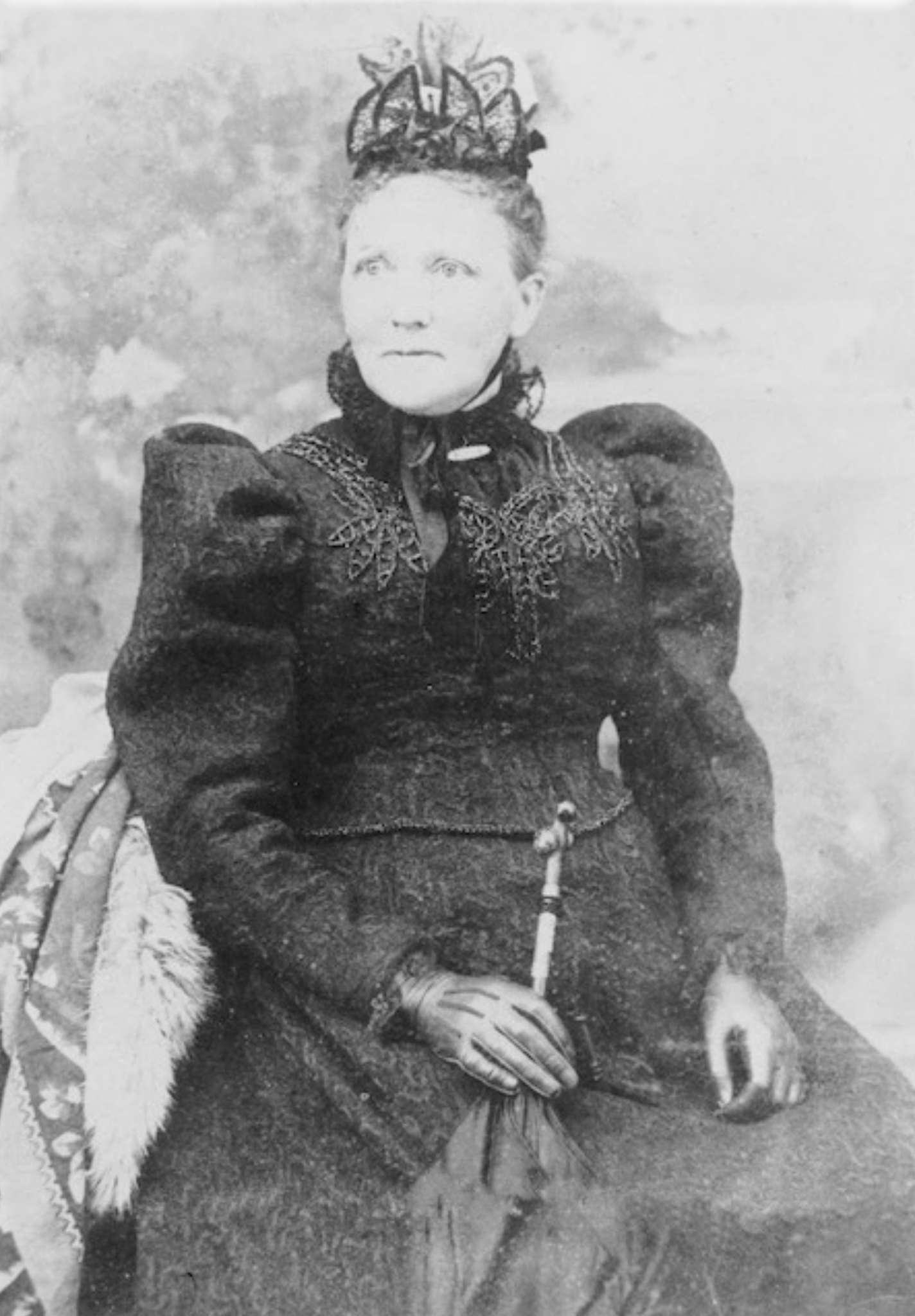
- Born: c. 1842; Edinburgh, Midlothian, Scotland
- Died: 28 January 1903 (aged 61); Hokitika, New Zealand
- Spouse: Robert Addison

Agnes Addison (née Broomfield; c. 1842 – 28 January 1903) was a New Zealand draper.

== Biography ==
Addison was born Agnes Broomfield in Edinburgh, Midlothian, Scotland, in about 1842, to Margaret Fairbairn and her husband, Joseph Broomfield. She married New Zealander Robert Addison in Edinburgh on 19 August 1874, and the couple soon moved to the goldfields town of Hokitika in New Zealand's South Island, where Robert had a picture framer and carpenter's business in Revell Street. They arrived in the country in January 1875 aboard the Michael Angelo. They were Presbyterian.

Agnes and Robert Addison had four daughters: Margaret (born mid 1875), Alice, Jemima (Jessie), and Agnes. When Robert died in late 1885, Agnes Addison was left with the task of bringing up the four young daughters and also became the sole owner of the Addisons' two stores, in Revell Street and Hamilton Street. The following year she began selling millinery goods such as thread and cloth. By 1890, the business was well-established as a drapery and millinery products store, and expanded in the following years.

== Death and legacy ==
Addison died at home in Hokitika on 28 January 1903, and she was buried in Hokitika Cemetery. She had become one of the town's most prominent businesswomen, and the business she established continued to thrive long after the West Coast goldfields were played out. Three of her daughters, Agnes, Jessie and Alice, continued to run the business after her death. It has survived into the 21st century as Addisons Clothing, which still operates on the original Revell Street site.
