= Rex Addison =

Australian architect

- Born: Brisbane, Australia
- Occupation: Architect
- Buildings: 1974–75 Addison house, Brisbane; PNG Coffee Industry Board office and Warehouse, Papua New Guinea 1972–82; Bingham hall

Rex Addison is an Australian architect. He is one of a number of Queensland architects to have benefited from the wide publication of his work, in relation to the exploration of a local regional style of architecture. He accumulated an extensive amount of architectural practice experience in a relatively short time, Addison acknowledges that his ideas and intentions originate from his experience of culture of Queensland architecture and its subtropical environment. His work is considered an exemplar of a particular contemporary South-East Queensland "style".

== Early years and education ==
Born in Brisbane, Australia, Rex Addison was growing up in a family of tradesmen working in a building industry. He was then aroused the passion of designing and building. He was resonance with the rich mix of friendly materials created by Frank Lloyd Wright when he started his architecture studies. He started his architecture studies at the University of Queensland in 1965 and has a graduate diploma from the Architectural Association in London.

== Working life ==
Following four years of practice as an architect in Papua New Guinea, from 1978 to 1982, Addison established his own Brisbane based practice. The work of this practice has been widely published and has received awards in Queensland, the ACT and Papua New Guinea. He has delivered many public lectures on his work and has taught in architecture faculties as a number of universities. He is currently Adjunct Associate Professor of Architecture at the University of Queensland. His house and studio, two of the three buildings at the centre of this discussion, won the Robin Dods Award in the RAIA’s 2000 program. The Speculative House, the third in the ‘3 in the Pocket’ was published in Architecture Australia in May/June 2005. Addison’s work has been described in Architecture Australia as "a thoughtful linkage from the public heritage of formal architectural ideas through local building traditions to his own history."

== Notable projects ==
- Addison house, Brisbane - It is located in the inner-Western suburb of Taringa It was constructed between 1971 and 1973.
- PNG Coffee Industry Board office and Warehouse, Papua New Guinea 1972-82 - As coffee became the second largest income earning industry after mining in Papua New Guinea in the late 1970s, the Coffee Industry Board wanted to enlarge their company image by building new facilities. The new facilities were expected to advertise international sales of the crop; also to guarantee continuity of supply by regulating the sales and storing the beans for years. It was satisfied by giving over most of the site to a long term storage warehouse right behind the office headquarters. The Goroka air strip is located to the west of the site. The office is enveloped in large timber sunbreaks on the ground floor and timber slat and signwritten canvas blinds on the first floor. The timber post and beam, which were left-over cores at the mill, was transferred from circular to the rectangular geometry by pairs of cast iron brackets on each pole column. There are a small tiered amphitheatre for film shows and coffee auctions nestles at the corner of the ground floor which with a courtyard within it. The outside walls cladding is formed in river rock. The coffee beans should be storage in a standard temperature. In order to minimal temperature variation through the day/night cycle, concrete block is used for the warehouse walls. Slow down of heat gain in the day and heat loss at night also achieved by the high mass wall.

Examples of his works, including Taringa House (1999) and Studio (1997), have been exhibited at the Queensland Art Gallery.
