= Linda Addison =

Linda Addison may refer to:

- Linda Addison (lawyer) (born 1951), American lawyer, business executive and author
- Linda Addison (poet) (born 1952), American poet and writer of horror, fantasy, and science fiction
