= Margaret Addison =

Canadian educator & Victoria College graduate (1868–1940)

Margaret E. T. Addison CBE
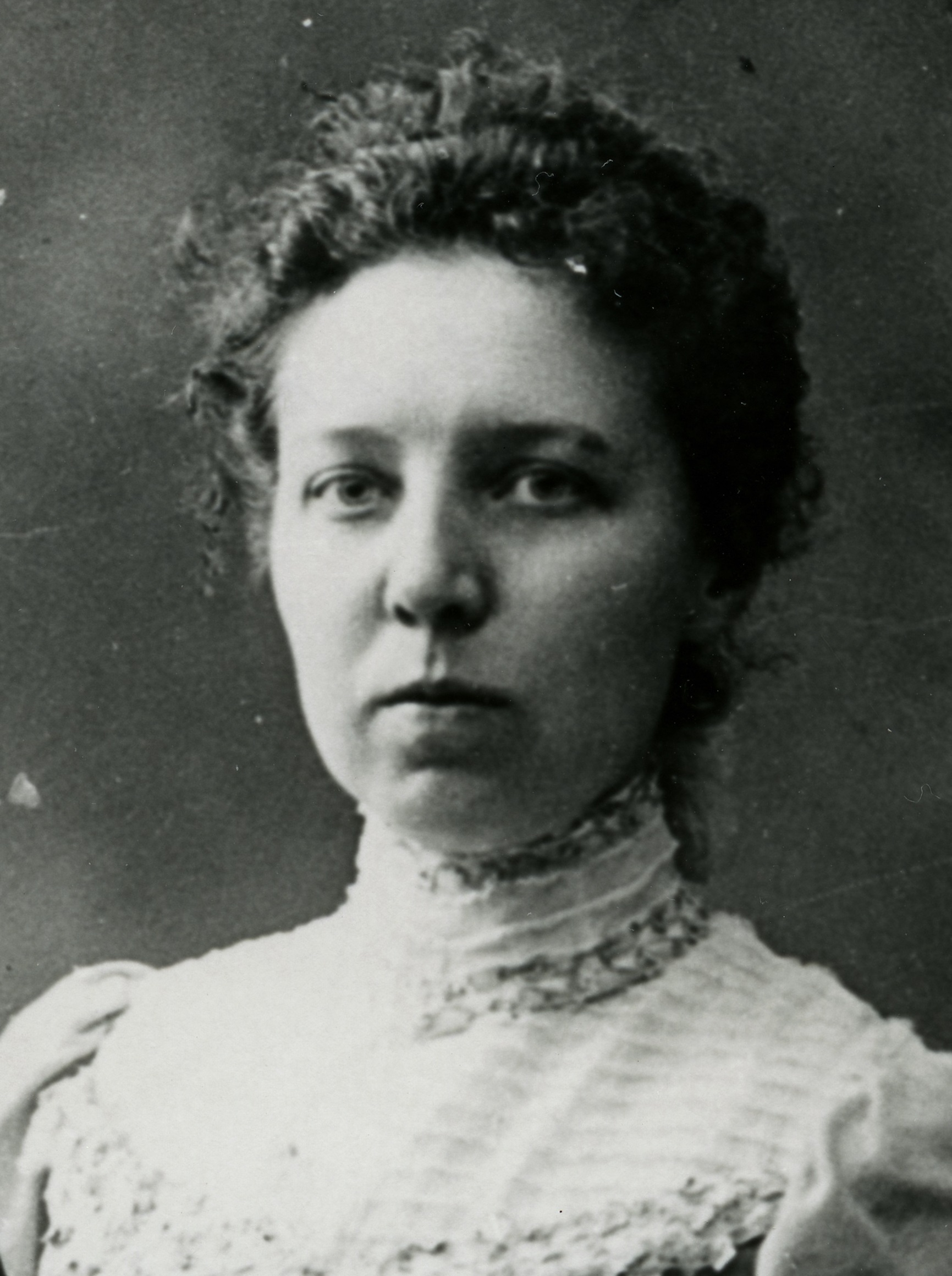
- Born: 21 October 1868; Horning’s Mills Ontario, Canada
- Died: 18 December 1940 (aged 72); Toronto, Ontario, Canada
- Education: Victoria College

Margaret Eleanor Theodora Addison CBE (October 21, 1868 – December 18, 1940) was a Canadian educator and the sixth woman to graduate from Victoria College, then located in Cobourg, Ontario. She was the first dean of women at Victoria College.

== Biography ==
Addison was born in Horning's Mills, Ontario, Canada, into a strong Methodist family. She was the first of five children born to a preacher, Peter, and Mary, who was a Sunday school teacher. She is described by Chambers as "a stalwart, intelligent figure who trained as a teacher and worked steadfastly to achieve good teaching positions first in Stratford and later in Lindsay, Ontario."

She attended Victoria College, and was the sixth woman to graduate from that program. Addison earned a BA in modern languages in 1889.

Addison taught mathematics and chemistry at the Ontario Ladies’ College in Whitby (1889–1891) before becoming a specialist in French and German at Stratford Collegiate Institute (1892–1900) and Lindsay Collegiate Institute (1901–1903).

She gained an early interest in advancing educational opportunities for women. While traveling on a 1900 trip to England with her sister in 1900, "she visited St Anne's College, Oxford and Newnham and Girton Colleges, Cambridge, the women's university residences. She returned to Canada with many progressive ideas for the initiation of such a residence here." She began by raising funds to build Annesley Hall which would become the first university residence for women in Canada. In 1898, the job of fundraising was adopted by the Victoria College Alumnae Association, of which Addison was president. On completion of the building in 1903, the college asked her to become the first dean of women. Although it promised a cut in salary, she accepted the position and remained there for 28 years until 1931. During that time, she "tenaciously advocated for more and better housing, and educational options for female students."

House rules for women were strict. "Meals were formal, with prayers after breakfast and dinner, and lights had to be out by 11:00 p.m. The purity of the young charges was strictly guarded. The main doors were locked after dinner; one could leave for the evening only if granted permission, which depended on such matters as destinations and suitable chaperones. Gentlemen were allowed to step inside on the second and fourth Friday evenings of the month, or on Sundays after church."

Margaret Addison died unmarried in Toronto on December 18, 1940, at 72.

== Legacy ==
- Awarded an honorary doctorate by the University of Toronto in 1932.
- Appointed a CBE (Canadian Commanders of the Order of the British Empire) in 1934.
- The Margaret Addison Scholarship for women pursuing postgraduate studies outside Canada was created to recognize her contributions to women in higher education.
