= Statutory Repairs, Edinburgh =

The statutory notice system in Edinburgh, Scotland, was instituted after a series of incidents in the 1990s culminating in a serious accident in 1999 in which a person was killed. Statutory notices require homeowners to carry out repairs using council-approved builders to protect the architecture of a World Heritage city. This system is unique to Edinburgh.

The value of statutory notices issued by Edinburgh Council surveyors had increased from £9.2m in 2005 to more than £30m in 2010. The statutory notice means the council can commission repair work to be carried out on buildings in the city in order to stop them deteriorating, and then charges the owners for the work. The council keeps 15% of the costs.

A BBC Scotland Investigates programme, Scotland's Property Scandal, commissioned a quantity surveyor, Gordon Murdie, and a structural engineer, John Addison, to examine repairs carried out under the statutory notice system. Their view was that residents had been overcharged. The BBC alleged the work had been given to contractors who had not been approved.

Edinburgh Council suspended several employees from the property conservation department following the BBC programme's broadcast on 20 September 2011, and instituted an independent investigation. Lothian and Borders Police are also carried out a fraud enquiry. The Police Scotland fraud probe no criminality, but the giving of gifts and hospitality in the department was said to have been widespread.

By January 2012 at least 650 complaints had been received by the council. A working estimate suggests that the total amount of overcharging (based on a figure of ten per cent of the value of building repairs contracts since 2005) may exceed £13.5M.

In April 2013 the Statutory Notice system was scrapped for all but emergency work.

An Internal Auditor report indicated that there had been 986 complaints about statutory repairs worth £30bn. The Property Conservation closure cost the council at least £8.3m in consultancy costs since 2011 with, at its height, a team of 42 seconded staff and consultants from Thomson Bethune and Deloitte working on the wind down.
