= Benjamin N. O. Addison =

Ghanaian politician

Benjamin N. O. Addison was a Ghanaian politician and mayor of Accra Metropolitan Assembly during the Kwame Nkrumah administration from 1963 to 1966.
