= Gollan Addison =

Australian cricketer (1877–1935)

Personal information
- Full name: Alexander Gollan Addison
- Born: 29 September 1877; Adelaide, Australia
- Died: 12 October 1935 (aged 58); Double Bay, Australia

Domestic team information
- Years: Team
- 1903: Tasmania
- Source: Cricinfo, 17 January 2016

Alexander Gollan Addison (29 September 1877 – 12 October 1935) was an Australian cricketer. He played one first-class match for Tasmania in 1903.

== Early life ==
Addison was born in Adelaide at the end of September 1877 to parents John Gollan Addison and Marion (nee Johnston). He was educated at Glenelg Grammar School and Prince Alfred College.

== Move to Tasmania ==
Addison moved to Tasmania at the start of the 20th century in time to participate in the 1901–02 season and began his local cricket career with Derwent Cricket Club. He soon displayed his all-round batting and pace bowling skills by scoring 62 and taking three wickets for 53 runs. After just a few weeks in Hobart, Addison moved to northern Tasmania and joined the Launceston Cricket Club.

Strong performances in the northern grade competition quickly led to Addison being selected to represent the North in the regular intrastate matches against the South. He did not disappoint the selectors, scoring 59 runs in the second innings and taking five wickets for 58 runs. In the 1902–03 representative match, Addison again performed well for the North, playing another significant knock in the second innings and taking three wickets for 29 runs.

== First-class match ==
Addison was chosen in January 1904 to play at Launceston for Tasmania against the visiting Marylebone Cricket Club team. In the only first-class match of his career Addison was quite unsuccessful. He was bowled for zero by Ted Arnold, and his ten overs were expensive, costing 64 runs. He did take the wicket of Albert Knight and was the fielder involved in the run out of Wilfred Rhodes.

== Personal and working life ==
Addison married Marie Sybil Murphy at Westbury in October 1904. They were divorced in mid-1923. He married his second wife Mary Eveleyn Roberts in 1925.

Addison spent much of his adult life as an official of the National Bank of Australasia, moving between a number of various branches around the country. Addison died in October 1935 in Double Bay, Sydney, still on staff at the bank.

== See also ==
- List of Tasmanian representative cricketers
