= Addison Township =

Addison Township may refer to the following places in the United States:

- Addison Township, DuPage County, Illinois
- Addison Township, Shelby County, Indiana
- Addison Township, Michigan
- Addison Township, Knox County, Nebraska
- Addison Township, North Dakota
- Addison Township, Ohio
- Addison Township, Pennsylvania
