= John Addison (divine) =

John Addison D.D. (fl. 1538), was an English divine. A native of the diocese of York, he was admitted to a fellowship at Pembroke Hall, Cambridge University in 1505, and graduated B.D. in 1519, and D.D. in 1523. He became chaplain to John Fisher, bishop of Rochester, and in the twenty-fifth year of the reign of Henry VIII he was attainted by parliament of misprision of treason for concealment of the pretended revelations of Elizabeth Barton, the "Holy Maid of Kent", and it was enacted that he should lose his spiritual promotions from 20 March 1533–4.

Dr Addison superintended the publication of Bishop Fisher's Assertionis Lutheranæ Confutatio, 1523, and had a grant from the king of the sole printing of it for three years. In about 1538 he wrote a book in support of the pope's supremacy over all bishops, to which a reply was made by Cuthbert Tunstal, bishop of Durham, and John Stokesly, bishop of London.
