= Laura Addison =

English stage actress

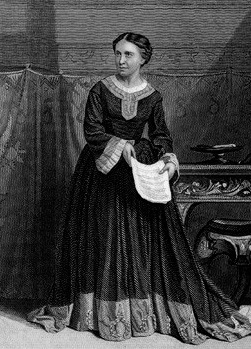
- Born: Laura Wilmshurst; November 15, 1822; Colchester
- Died: September 3, 1852 (aged 29); American coastal waters
- Occupation: actor

Laura Addison (15 November 1822– 3 September 1852) was an English stage actress.

== Biography ==
Addison was born on the 15 November 1822 in Colchester. She was the daughter of a grocer named Thomas Wilmshurst.

She made her first appearance as "Miss Addison" on the stage in November 1843, at the Worcester Theatre, as Lady Townley in The Provoked Husband. Her family had opposed her desire to become an actress; she had no introduction and was self-instructed. She was favourably received by the public. She went to Glasgow, playing Desdemona to the Othello of Macready, secured the good opinion of that tragedian. At his instance, after she had played with success at Dublin and Edinburgh, she was engaged by Mr. Phelps, and made her first appearance at Sadler's Wells, then under his management, in August 1846, as Lady Mabel in The Patrician's Daughter of Westland Marston. She remained at Sadler's Wells for several seasons where she overshadowed Fanny Cooper so much that she left. Addison played Juliet, Portia, Isabella in Measure for Measure, Imogen, Miranda, and Lady Macbeth; she appeared as Panthea upon the revival of Beaumont and Fletcher's comedy of A King and no King; and she was the first representative of Margaret Randolph and Lilian Saville in the poetic tragedies of Feudal Times and John Saville of Haysted by James White.

In 1849 she was playing at the Haymarket with Mr. and Mrs. Charles Kean, and in 1850 she accepted an engagement at Drury Lane under Mr. Anderson's management, representing the characters of Mrs. Haller in the Stranger, Mrs. Beverley in the Gamester, Bianca in Fazio, and Leonora in an English version of Schiller's Fiesco. In 1851 she left England for America, and died on 3 September 1852 on the steamer Oregon travelling from Albany to New York City and was buried there. Under her real name, Laura Wilmshurst, she is in Vault 91 of the New York Marble Cemetery on Second Avenue.

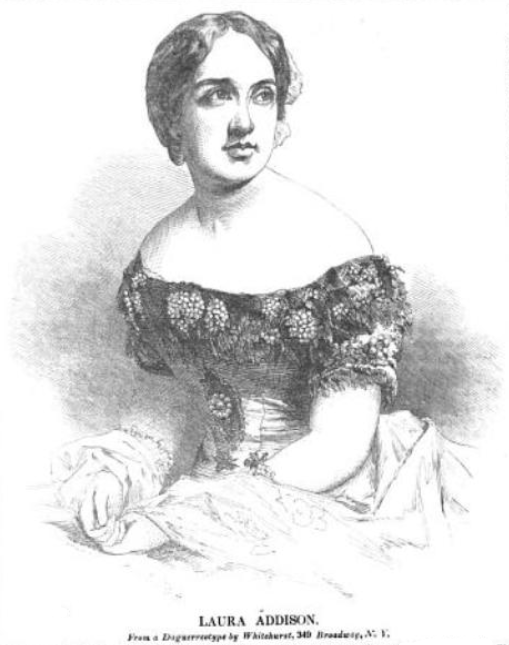
