= Handel Opera Society =

London-based opera society

The Handel Opera Society (renamed "Handel Opera" in 1980) gave performances of operas by George Frideric Handel in London from 1955 to 1985. It was founded by conductor Charles Farncombe, who directed it from its founding until its dissolution. The Society was founded with the idea of reviving interest in Handel's music.
