= Jonathan Addison =

English cricketer

Cricket information
- Batting: Right-handed
- Bowling: Slow left arm orthodox

Career statistics
| Competition | First-class | List A |
|---|---|---|
| Matches | 1 | 7 |
| Runs scored | 67 | 36 |
| Batting average | 33.50 | 7.20 |
| 100s/50s | 0/1 | 0/0 |
| Top score | 51 | 11 |
| Balls bowled | – | 18 |
| Wickets | – | 0 |
| Bowling average | – | – |
| 5 wickets in innings | – | – |
| 10 wickets in match | – | – |
| Best bowling | – | – |
| Catches/stumpings | 0/– | 0/– |
- Source: CricketArchive, 30 December 2021

Jonathan Paul Addison (born 14 November 1965) is an English former cricketer who played first-class cricket for Leicestershire in 1983. He was a right-handed batsman and a slow left-arm orthodox spin bowler who played his only game of first-class cricket for the team in 1983 against the touring New Zealanders. He was born in Leek, Staffordshire.

Addison also played List A cricket for the county between 1983 and 1985, for Staffordshire between 1987 and 1991, and for the Minor Counties in 1988. Addison played in two Youth Tests against the West Indies Young Cricketers and two Youth One-Day Internationals against the same team in January and February 1985.

He scored a first-class fifty, 51, in his only match for Leicestershire against the touring New Zealanders. But he failed to impress with the bat in his three one-day games for the county.
