= George Addison =

George Addison may refer to:

- George Augustus Addison (1792–1814), author
- George Henry Male Addison (1857–1922), Australian architect
- George William Addison (1849–1937), English soldier and footballer
