= Addison Railroad =

Addison Railroad may refer to:

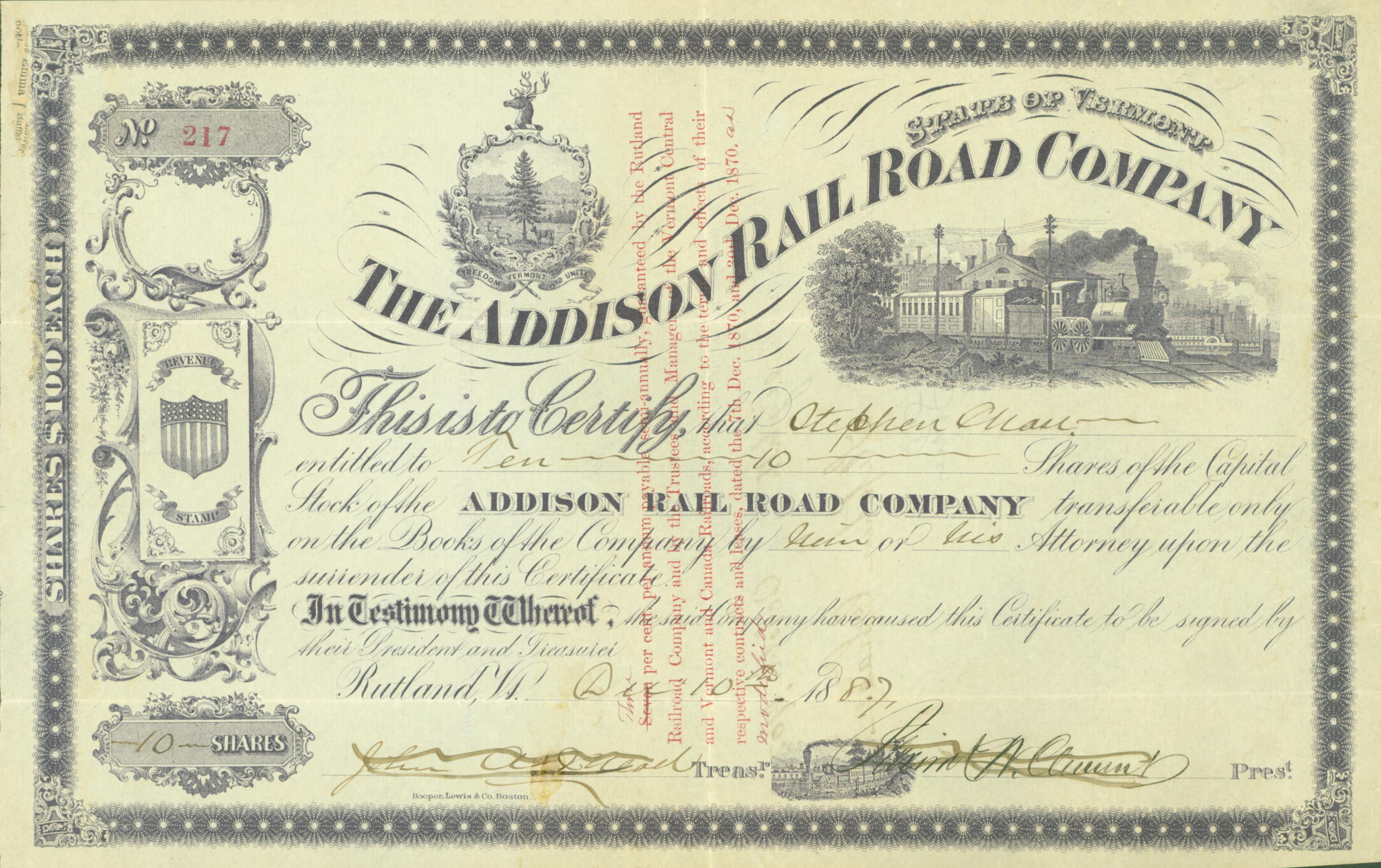
Share of the Vermont Addison Rail Road Company, issued 10 December 1887

- Addison Railroad (Vermont), a predecessor of the Rutland Railroad
- Addison Railroad (Illinois) (1890-1892), a predecessor of the Illinois Central Railroad
