= Tom Addison (baseball) =

American baseball player

- Shortstop

Negro league baseball debut
- 1910, for the Philadelphia Giants

Last appearance
- 1911, for the Philadelphia Giants

Teams
- Philadelphia Giants (1910–1911)

Thomas Addison was an American Negro league shortstop in the 1910s.

Addison played for the Philadelphia Giants in 1910 and 1911. In 20 recorded games, he posted 11 hits in 72 plate appearances.
