= Addison Cresswell (disambiguation) =

Addison Cresswell may refer to:

- Addison Cresswell (politician) (Addison John Baker Cresswell; 1788–1879), Member of Parliament
- Joe Baker-Cresswell (Addison Joe Baker-Cresswell; 1901–1997), Royal Navy officer
- Addison Cresswell (Addison Lee Cresswell; 1960–2013), talent agent
