= Harry W. Addison =

American writer

Harry Wayne Addison (September 8, 1920 – August 24, 2003) was a writer from the American south and a humorist whose works painted vivid portraits of his experiences growing up as a poor boy in Depression-era rural Louisiana. While he never received much recognition on a national level, Addison enjoyed modest success, not only from his writings, but also his frequent public speaking appearances throughout Louisiana and much of the South. He was a favorite orator at college and high school graduations, as well as meetings of regional civic organizations. A veteran of World War II, Addison received the Bronze Star for bravery in combat while serving on Iwo Jima. He moved to Rayville, Louisiana in 1945, where he resided until 1957. He was a longtime resident of Monroe, Louisiana. His works include Write That Down For Me Daddy (1974) ISBN 0-88289-116-2, RFD #3 (1977) ISBN 1-56554-114-6, and Mama Was a Con Man, Papa Was a Christian (1989) ISBN 1-56554-547-8.
