= Michael Addison =

Michael Addison may refer to:

- Michael Addison, 3rd Viscount Addison (1914–1992), British civil servant and academic
- Michael K. Addison (born 1980), American convicted murderer
