= Edward William Elton =

English actor (1794–1843)

- Born: August 1794; London
- Died: 20 July 1843 (aged 48) off Lindisfarne
- Occupation: Actor

Edward William Elton (August 1794 – 20 July 1843) was an English actor.

== Biography ==
Elton was born in London, in the parish of Lambeth, in August 1794, and was trained for the law in the office of a solicitor named Springhall in Verulam Buildings, Gray's Inn. His father, whose name was Elt, was a schoolmaster in the neighbourhood of Tottenham Court Road, and got up plays among his scholars. In these, at the Sans Souci Theatre in Leicester Place, and subsequently at Pym's private theatre, Wilson Street, Gray's Inn Lane, Elton acted, as a youth.

After joining a strolling company, he appeared, in 1823, as utility actor at the Olympic, playing in A Fish out of Water, where he made the acquaintance of Tyrone Power. At Christmas he went to the Liverpool Amphitheatre, where the following year, after a summer engagement at Birmingham, under Alfred Bunn, he played Napoleon in the spectacle of the Battle of Waterloo. He then, at the Theatre Royal, Liverpool, played Cominius in Coriolanus. After starring in Chester, Worcester, Shrewsbury, and elsewhere, he attracted in Manchester the favourable notice of Charles Young, with whom he appeared in Norwich and Cambridge.

His efforts in Shakespearean parts were not very successful. With a fair country reputation, however, he came in 1831 to the Garrick Theatre in Whitechapel, opening under Conquest and Wynn in Richard III. Great popularity attended him at the East End.

In October 1832 he was at the Strand Theatre, whence he went to the Surrey. An unsuccessful engagement at the Haymarket, under Morris, in 1833 came to a speedy termination. He then returned to the minor theatres, was in the spring of 1836 at the Adelphi, and 10 January 1837 at Covent Garden, under David Osbaldiston's management, made a success as the eponymous Walter Tyrrell.

On the production, 26 June 1837, at the Haymarket of The Bridal adapted by Sheridan Knowles from the Maid's Tragedy of Beaumont and Fletcher, he gained much credit as Amintor. He was then engaged for Covent Garden, at which house he was the original Beauséant in The Lady of Lyons. At Drury Lane, 1839–40, he played Romeo and Rolls, and was the original Rizzio in Haynes's Mary Stuart. He then retired to the minor theatres, and in 1841-2 returned with Macready to Drury Lane. The theatre closed 14 June 1843. Before the termination of the season he accepted an engagement of a month from William H. Murray of the Theatre Royal, Edinburgh.

In addition to the characters mentioned above, Elton was good as Edgar in King Lear. He was the original Eugene Aram, Thierry, and Waller in The Love Chase of Sheridan Knowles.

Elton contributed to periodical literature, and gave lectures on drama at the National Hall, Holborn. He was one of the original promoters of the General Theatrical Fund Association.

In 1843, at the end of his month's engagement in Edinburgh, he boarded the Pegasus for London and was drowned when the ship struck rocks near Holy Island and went down. A strong sensation was caused by his death, and benefits for his children, to which liberal subscriptions were sent, took place at many theatres. The chair at a preliminary meeting in London for the purpose was taken by Charles Dickens.

== Family ==
Elton was unfortunate in marriage, having been separated from his first wife, and the second wife, a Miss Pratt, the mother of five of his seven children, going mad.
