= Alwin Addison =

Australian cricketer

Personal information
- Full name: Alwin Hogarth Addison
- Born: 27 October 1887; Orroroo, South Australia
- Died: 31 July 1971 (aged 83); Armidale, New South Wales
- Batting: Left-handed
- Bowling: Left-arm medium-pace

Domestic team information
- Years: Team
- 1909–10: Canterbury

Career statistics
Competition	First class
Matches	2
Runs scored	15
Batting average	3.75
100s/50s	0/0
Top score	10
Balls bowled	64
Wickets	2
Bowling average	13
5 wickets in innings	0
10 wickets in match	0
Best bowling	2/11
Catches/stumpings	1/0
- Source: Cricinfo, 14 October 2016

Alwin Addison (27 October 1887 – 31 July 1971) was an Australian-born cricketer who played two matches of first-class cricket for Canterbury in 1910.

He spent his working life with the Union Bank of Australia, first in Australia, then in New Zealand from 1909 to 1918, then in Australia again, until he retired in 1950.
