= Sports Beanie Babies =

Sports-related Beanie Babies

Of the many themes and involvements of Beanie Babies produced by Ty, Inc., one of them has been professional sports. Beanies have been used both to represent and promote various sports.

== Automobile racing ==
In mid-2007, 22 NASCAR-themed beanies were introduced. Some are now retired. These included Racing Gold (in varying colors) and:

- Mark Martin
- Kurt Busch#2
- Kyle Busch#5
- Clint Bowyer#07
- Kasey Kahne#9
- Denny Hamlin#11
- Ryan Newman#12
- Greg Biffle#16
- Matt Kenseth#17
- J. J. Yeley#18
- Elliott Sadler#19
- Tony Stewart#20
- Jeff Gordon#24
- Casey Mears#25
- Kevin Harvick#29
- Jeff Burton#31
- Jimmie Johnson#48
- Carl Edwards#99

== Baseball ==
=== Giveaways ===
At some Major League Baseball games, various beanies have been given away to some of the fans. At games that had Beanie Baby giveaways, attendance greatly increased.

HERE IS A LIST OF BEANIE BABIES GIVEN AWAY (SGA) AT BASEBALL GAMES:

5/18/97 Chicago Cubs Cubbie the Bear

9/06/97 Chicago Cubs Cubbie the Bear

9/18/97 Chicago Cubs Cubbie the Bear

3/10/98 New York Yankees Bones the Dog

5/03/98 Chicago Cubs Daisy the Cow (Harry Caray)

5/17/98 New York Yankees Valentino the Bear

5/22/98 St. Louis Cardinals Stretch the Ostrich

5/31/98 Detroit Tigers Stripes the Tiger

5/31/98 Milwaukee Brewers Batty the Bat

5/31/98 Kansas City Royals Roary the Lion

6/14/98 Arizona Diamondbacks Hissy the Snake

7/07/98 Colorado Rockies Glory the Bear

7/12/98 Chicago White Sox Blizzard the Tiger

7/12/98 New York Mets Batty the Bat

7/26/98 Tampa Bay Devil Rays Weenie the Dachshund

7/31/98 Minnesota Twins Lucky the Ladybug

8/04/98 Texas Rangers Pugsly the Pug

8/09/98 New York Yankees Stretch the Ostrich

8/14/98 St. Louis Cardinals Mac the Cardinal

8/14/98 San Diego Padres Waves the Whale

8/16/98 Houston Astros Derby the Horse

8/16/98 Cincinnati Reds Rover the Dog

8/19/98 Atlanta Braves Chip the Cat

8/22/98 New York Mets Curly the Bear

8/23/98 Tampa Bay Devil Rays Pinky the Flamingo

8/30/98 San Francisco Giants Tuffy the Dog

9/02/98 Atlanta Braves Pugsly the Pug

9/05/98 Seattle Mariners Chocolate the Moose

9/06/98 Oakland Athletics Peanut the Elephant

9/06/98 Anaheim Angels Mel the Koala

9/06/98 Toronto Blue Jays Rocket the Bluejay

9/08/98 Chicago Cubs Blackie the Bear

9/13/98 Chicago Cubs Gracie the Swan

9/14/98 St. Louis Cardinals Smoochy the Frog

4/11/99 San Francisco Giants Slippery the Seal

4/25/99 Chicago Cubs Sammy the Bear

5/30/99 New York Mets Valentina the Bear

6/12/99 Milwaukee Brewers Early the Robin

6/18/99 Minnesota Twins Hippie the Bunny

6/19/99 Cincinnati Reds Scorch the Dragon

7/03/99 Houston Astros Goatee the Goat

7/11/99 Detroit Tigers Kuku the Cockatoo

7/18/99 Houston Astros Tiny the Chihuahua

8/05/99 Chicago Cubs Erin the Bear

8/15/99 New York Yankees Millennium the Bear

9/01/99 Oakland Athletics Peace the Bear

9/05/99 Texas Rangers Luke the Dog

9/06/99 Kansas City Royals Fortune the Panda

9/26/99 Chicago Cubs Millennium the Bear

9/10/00 Chicago Cubs Aurora the Polar Bear

5/20/01 Chicago Cubs Addison the Bear

5/04/03 Chicago Cubs Dusty the Bear

=== Beanies representing baseball players ===
- Mac the cardinal, in honor of Mark McGwire, introduced in 1999. A Beanie Buddy version was later made and simply called "Cardinal."
- Rocket the blue jay, in honor of Roger Clemens, introduced in 1998. A Teenie Beanie version was #5 in the 1999 series.
- Sammy the bear, in honor of Sammy Sosa, introduced in 1999. A Pillow Pal called "Sherbert" was introduced later the same year that was similar in style.

=== Addison ===
Addison the bear was first introduced at a Cubs game on May 20, 2001, a game at which the Cubs beat the Diamondbacks 6-5. A total of 10,000 were given away to children 13 and under. It was not until after this game that addison was introduced to retailers.

== Soccer ==
=== Kicks ===
Kicks the bear, introduced early in 1999, was the first beanie to represent a sport. A Beanie Buddy version of Kicks was made in 2000.

=== Champion ===
Champion was a bear made in 2002 in 32 versions, representing 32 countries in the World Cup. The version for any particular country was retired on the day that country was eliminated from the World Cup tournament. The hand tag of each Champion bear provided information on that country's team. All versions were introduced on April 4, 2002. None have birthdays.

Country	Date Retired
Argentina	6/7/02
Belgium	6/17/02
Brazil	6/30/02
Cameroon	6/11/02
China	6/4/02
Costa Rica	6/13/02
Croatia	6/03/02
Denmark	6/15/02
Ecuador	6/03/02
England	6/21/02
France	5/31/02
Germany	6/30/02
Ireland	6/16/02
Italy	6/08/02
Japan	6/18/02
Korea	6/25/02
Mexico	6/17/02
Nigeria	6/02/02
Paraguay	6/07/02
Poland	6/04/02
Portugal	6/05/02
Russia	6/09/02
Saudi Arabia	6/01/02
Senegal	6/22/02
Slovenia	6/02/02
South Africa	6/12/02
Spain	6/22/02
Sweden	6/16/02
Tunisia	6/05/02
Turkey	6/03/02
United States	6/14/02
Uruguay	6/01/02
