= Joseph Addison (disambiguation) =

Joseph Addison (1672–1719) was an English politician and writer.

Joseph Addison may also refer to:

- Joseph Addison (diplomat) (1879–1953), British ambassador
- Joseph Edward Addison (1821–1890), British army officer
