= Addison Rerecich =

American double-lung transplant recipient

- Born: October 1, 1999; Marana, Arizona, United States
- Died: December 30, 2019 (aged 20); Marana, Arizona, United States

Addison Rerecich (October 1, 1999 – December 30, 2019) was an American double-lung transplant recipient who spent the longest documented duration of time using extracorporeal membrane oxygenation (ECMO) therapy at 93 days. She underwent the transplant at age 11 in 2011 and was the subject of a 2013 episode of Frontline on PBS. She suffered from Methicillin-resistant Staphylococcus aureus (MRSA), a difficult-to-treat staph infection.

== Infection ==
In May 2011, Rerecich began showing a variety of symptoms including fatigue, hip pain, and a high fever. Her mother Tonya, a registered nurse, gave Addison ibuprofen to treat the symptoms and eventually took her to a local hospital. Doctors there suspected a virus, but the pain and fever continued to get worse over the following few days. Eventually, Tonya took her daughter to the Diamond Children's Medical Center, a part of the University of Arizona Medical Center.

The day she arrived at the hospital, Addison went into septic shock and was soon placed on ECMO therapy to sustain life. Doctors eventually discovered that she had contracted an antibiotic-resistant strain of MRSA (probably from a scrape or scab). Other complications she encountered during her five-month hospital stay included Stenotrophomonas maltophilia, e. coli, a drug-resistant form of pneumonia, a pulmonary embolism, and a stroke. She also underwent several surgeries.

=== Double-lung transplant ===
In September 2011, Rerecich underwent a successful double-lung transplant surgery. She returned home in November 2011. The total medical cost of her hospital stay reached $6 million. Rerecich continued to engage in physical therapy and took dozens of medications daily to limit the chance of infection.

== Death ==
Rerecich's body began to reject her lungs in early 2019. She refused to have another transplant. Rerecich died in her home on December 30, 2019, surrounded by friends and family at the age of 20.
