= Lily Isabel Maude Addison =

Australian architect

Lily Addison
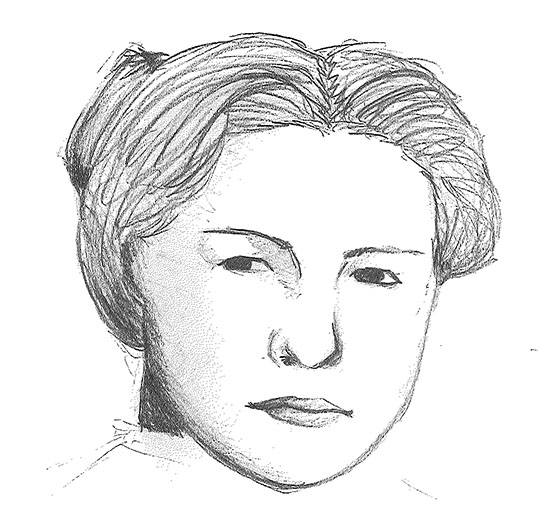
- Artistic rendering of a photograph of Lily Addison c. 1904
- Born: Lily Isabel Maude Addison; 3 December 1885; St Kilda, Victoria, Australia
- Died: 1968
- Occupation: Architect
- Practice: G.H.M. Addison & Son.
- Design: Contribution to woman architects in the industry

Lily Isabel Maude Addison (1885–1968) was a female architect who practised in Queensland, Australia. She practiced at a time when very few women worked as architects.

== Personal ==
Lily Isabel Maude Addison was born on 12 March 1885 at St Kilda, Melbourne, Victoria. Lily's last name Maud was documented through the Australian Electoral Rolls (with an "e" added to "Maud). There was possibly a transcription error in the birth record as one of her mother's name being; Emily Alice Maude Addison, was Maude with an "e." According to the Victorian pioneers index 1837-1888 on microfiche, her name verifies that it was recorded as "Maud" although this is also up to speculation as this could have been an inscription error.

Lily lived with her family at Enoggera Terrace, Red Hill, Brisbane, Queensland and was documented being a draftswoman from 1908 to 1921 as well as an architect in 1922, and was also recorded being an architect in the years 1925.

There is no documentation for the years 1923 and 1924 which confirm her profession still being an architect within these two years. In 1921 and 1925 the name "Yeovil" was added to the Enoggera Terrace address where she lived.

Lily moved to Sydney in 1928. Lily and her sister, Edith May, were living at 1 George Street, Dulwich (from 1954 Marrickville), and their occupations were listed as home duties. Lily was still listed at this address on the 1968 roll but Edith was not.

Lily died in 1968.

== Family ==
The Addison family was large, all being Anglican except for Lily Addison's grandfather. Lily Addison's siblings included; Edward James Addison who became ill in health upon the return on the missioning he had done in West Africa around the time George Henry Male Addison (his son) was an infant. Shortly after this, his mother had also died leaving George an orphan who lived with his grandfather in Somersetshire. Lily also had a sibling named George Frederick and Edith May.

At fourteen his love for architecture informed his decision to pursue a career in Architecture, however given the patrimony and his three guardians, he was advised against his ambition to work in an office because of the poor money by one of the three guardians and instead worked in a bank for three years. It wasn't until later that he then pursued his love for architecture in an office for Hubbard a well known Rutherham architect. He finished his time and made for Liverpool for a year where he acclaimed credibility as a draftsman until moving to Melbourne and working for a firm; Terry and Oakden which later became Oakden, Addison and Kemp.

In 1889, George Henry Male Addison went to Brisbane and formed a partnership with Lily Addison's brother named George Frederick Addison., This partnership named G.H.M. Addison & Son allowed Lily Addison to participate in an array of works as an assistant architect alongside his brother and father.

The degree of contribution she made is not clear. Her work and contribution was never documented or recognized at this time. A lot of the works built from this partnership could give credibility to her contribution from the period of 1919 when G.H.M. Addison & Son was first established until 1928 when Lily Addison retired as well as her contribution to the entry of woman into the industry of Architecture and working in the office. Lily Addison's father G. H. M. Addison died in the Mater Misericordiae Hospital, Brisbane Hospital.

== Significance ==
Lily Addison was the daughter of a well known architect George Henry Male Addison (1857-1922) whose work was well known and now heritage listed.

Lily Addison was the first documented and known woman to have participated and worked in an architects office alongside Beatrice Hutton, who was the first woman to be admitted to an architectural institute when she was accepted in 1916 into the associate of the Queensland Institute of Architects.

Lily Addison's work in the office was predominantly based on the assistant role of her father in the year 1906 who established an architecture firm named G.H.M. Addison & Son. She contributed to the 2.7% of woman architects in Australia throughout the 1950s.

== Education ==
Lily Addison studied Building Construction and History of Architecture at the Brisbane Central Technical College in 1914.

== Notable projects ==
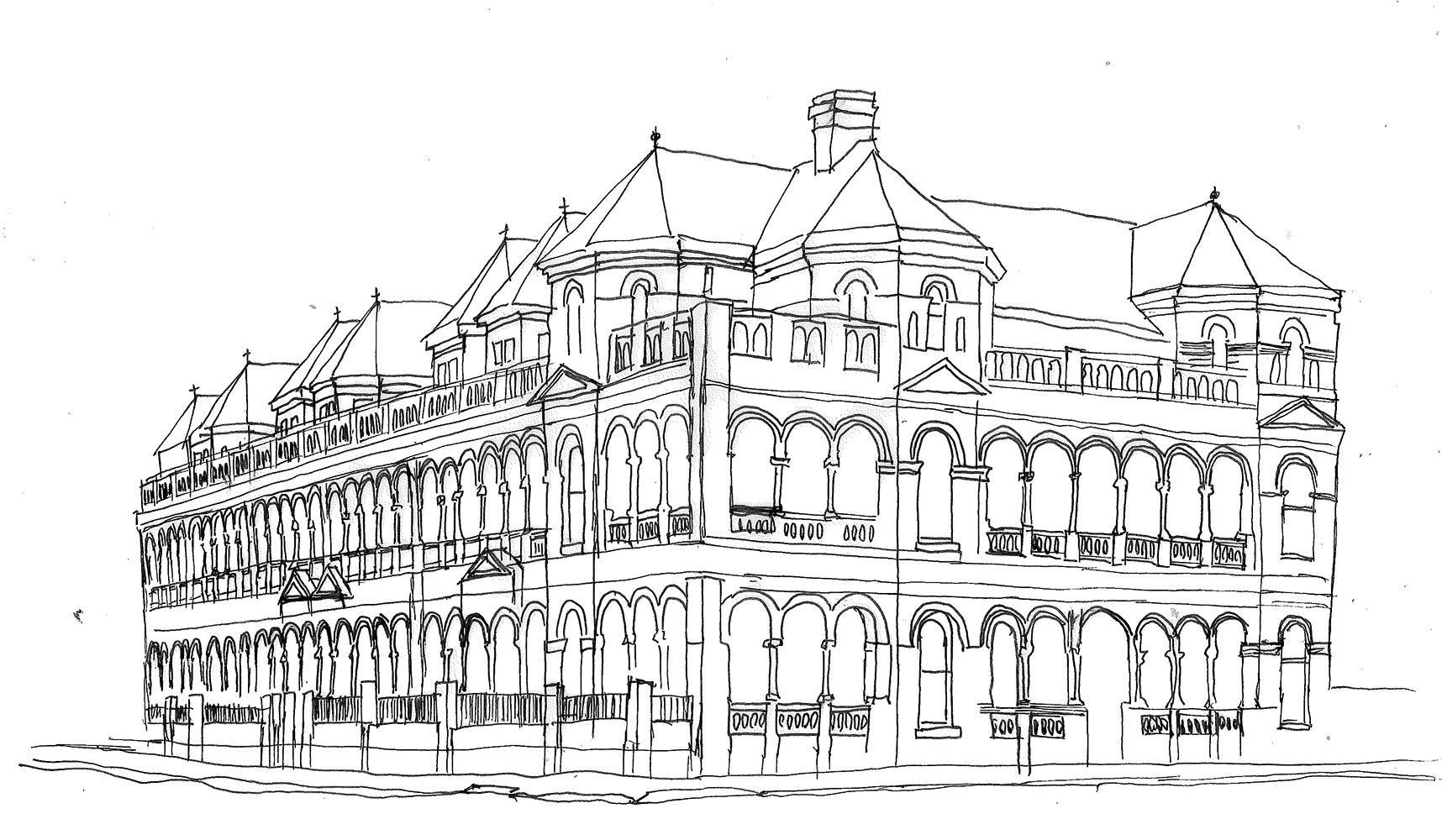
The Mansions were designed by G.H.M Addison, and constructed by RE Burton in 1889

Lily Addison's contribution in the field of architecture remains unclear, her role as an assistant architect in her father's firm G.H.M never acclaimed the contribution she made and no designs have been attributed to her name and documented to this day due to the predominance of male contribution in the field., With Lily Addison being the first known woman to work in this field of Architecture, there was little work to be acclaimed to her name with gender inequality being a major influence in this.

Lily's father George Henry Male Addison did however make significant contributions to architecture. The contribution of Lily if it all is unknown still. With works including the Albert Street Uniting Church, the ANZ Bank building at 43 Queen Street and the Cliveden Mansions in 1889 alongside many other buildings.

However, Lily Addison, as a practicing woman architect, did contribute to the entry of women in architecture which followed. Willis and Hanna state in "Women architects in Australia 1900–1950." Red Hill, A.C.T. : Royal Australian Institute of Architects "that Lily did not join the local institute of architects.

Lily Addison's contribution to women in the architecture industry lasted for over 20 years to 1928. To which after this point she moved to Sydney and focused on religion as a means of seclusion.
