= Robert Brydges Addison =

English composer and teacher (1854–1920)

Robert Brydges Addison (16 August 1854 – 8 July 1920) was an English composer, choirmaster and teacher.

Born in Dorchester on Thames, Oxfordshire, Addison was the son of clergyman William Fountaine Addison (1817-1893) - who had been Canon of Gibraltar Cathedral. He trained at the Royal Academy of Music where he studied with George Alexander Macfarren. Following four years as sub-professor to Macfarren Addison was appointed professor of harmony and composition at the academy, a position he held between 1882 and 1892. From 1892 he taught at Trinity College London.

His compositions include a Concert Allegro in G, the cantata A Vision (1880), the motet Save Me, O Lord, the anthem They that sow in tears, a Piano Sonata in A minor, and the Andante and Variations for piano. There are also many songs, including Rise! For the Day is Passing, which was performed at the BBC Proms in 1914, and several albums for children. While at the academy he composed a Symphony in G minor, of which two movements were performed on 15 December 1881.

Addison never married, and in 1891 was still living with his father in Ossett, Yorkshire. From 1910 until his death his address was 11 Sheriff Road, West Hampstead in London, though he died, aged 65, in Cranbrook, leaving a fortune of £11,150. His brother was the Oxfordshire painter William Grylls Addison (1853-1904).

== List of works ==
Orchestral

- Symphony in G minor (1881)
- Concert allegro in G major, for orchestra

Instrumental

- Piano Sonata in A minor
- Andante and Variations for piano

Choral

- A Vision, cantata for choir and orchestra (1880)
- Quiet Hours. Trio for female voices (1886)
- They that sow in tears, Psalm 126 (1889)
- Save me O Lord, motet

Songs

- Under the sea (1876)
- Weariness (1876)
- The days are cold, lullaby (1879)
- Always (1880)
- Wandering wishes (1881)
- Two doves (1882, pub. Stanley Lucas Weber & Co), dedicated to 'Miss Minna Vivian'
- A dream of long ago (1883)
- Children's Voices, album for children (1884)
- Love in a boat (1886)
- The early bird (1886)
- While we dream (1886)
- Under the snow, with cello accompaniment (1885-1887)
- Please Sing me a Song, album for children (1887)
- Do I love thee? O rushing wind (1887)
- Resemblance (1887)
- Thy roses (1887)
- Violets (1887)
- The sweetest hour (1887)
- First come... (The early bird) (1887)
- Brightness (1888)
- The dew is sweet to the lily (1888)
- A winter song (1888)
- In quiet sleep (1889)
- My heart's desire (1889)
- From a child's hand (1890)
- My love for thee (1891)
- O rushing wind (1891)
- Don't cry (1892)
- A summer morn (1893)
- Rise! for the day is passing (1901)
- When summer comes again (1906)
- Bright be the place of thy soul
