= Addison station =

Addison station may refer to:

- Addison station (CTA Blue Line), a rapid transit station in Chicago, Illinois
- Addison station (CTA Brown Line), an "L" station in Chicago, Illinois
- Addison station (CTA Red Line), an "L" station in Chicago, Illinois
- Addison station (DART), a commuter rail station in Addison, Texas
- Addison Road station, a Washington Metro station in Prince George's County, Maryland
- Addison Road railway station (England), now Kensington (Olympia) station, an Underground and Overground station in London, England
