= Fanny Cooper =

English actress (1814-1872)

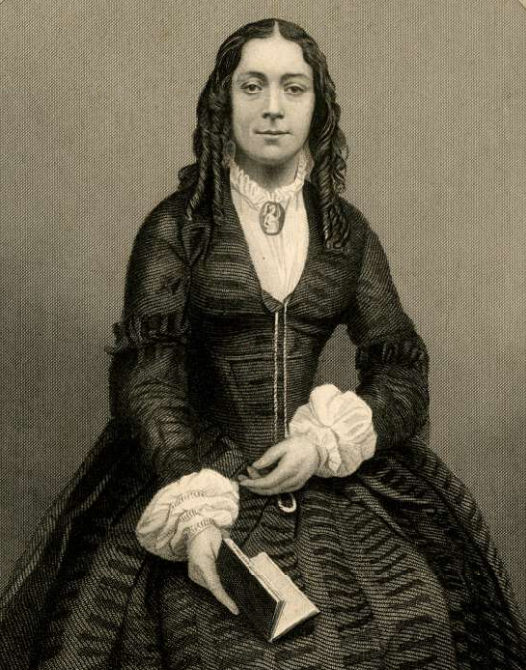
- in 1850 from John Tallis's magazine
- Born: Frances Charlotte Dalton; 1814; Greenwich
- Died: 21 April 1872 (aged 57–58)
- Occupation: Actor
- Spouse: Thomas Hailes Lacy
- Children: A son

Fanny Cooper has the stage name of Frances Charlotte Dalton married name Frances Dalton Lacy (1814 – 21 April 1872) was an English actress.

== Life ==
Cooper was born in Greenwich. Her mother was Miss Walton from Dublin and her father Mr Dalton was an actor. Her father died in 1825 and her mother remarried and became Mrs Cooper. She was acting when a young teenager and found work but little opportunity on the York circuit. She came to notice on the Lincoln circuit where she took the lead in 1837 in Mrs Thomas Robertson's company. The following year she made her first appearance in London at The Haymarket where she played Lydia in The Love Chase on 16 April 1838. The Times was impressed and gave her a glowing review. She went on to take leading parts at Covent Garden and the Haymarket.

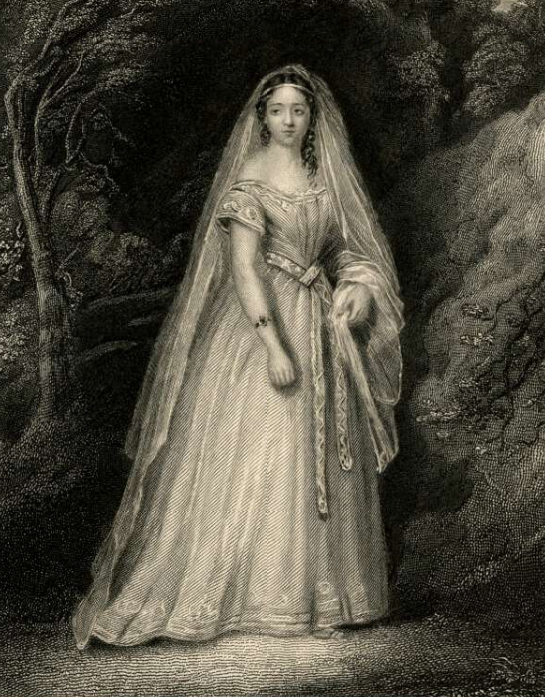
Fanny Cooper as Helena in Midsummer Nights Dream - Published by John Tallis in 1851

On 25 January 1842, Lacy married Thomas Hailes Lacy who was an actor who at that time managed The Theatre in Sheffield. The marriage probably took place at St Paul's church in Covent Garden, but maybe in Sheffield. They toured England together. Her husband's roles included Jacques (As You Like It) and Banquo (Macbeth). He would appear with her when she played Countess Wintersen in The Stranger, Nerissa in The Merchant of Venice, and Virginia in James Sheridan Knowles's Virginius.

In 1844 her husband seems to have had disagreements in London. She left Sadler's Wells to be replaced by Jane Mordaunt. In December they were both employed in Manchester at the Theatre Royal. On 9 December she opened as Marianna in "The Wife; A Tale of Mantua " again by Knowles with her husband as Leonardo Gonzago.

She died in 1872. She had a son but he was mentally ill and died in 1895. Thomas Hailes Lacy died at 1 August 1873 in Sutton, Surrey.
