= Western Times (Exeter) =

Defunct newspaper from Devon, England

The Western Times was a newspaper published in Exeter, Devon, England, from 1827 to 1952.
