= Thurtle =

Thurtle is a surname. Notable people with the surname include:

- Dorothy Thurtle (1890–1973), British women's right activist
- Ernest Thurtle (1884–1954), British Labour politician
