= Leah L'Estrange Malone =

British politician

Leah L'Estrange Malone (née Klingenstein; 1886 – 4 September 1951) was a British politician.

== Biography ==
She was born in London as Leah Klingenstein, to Arthur Klingenstein and Regina Klingenstein (née Schubach): her family changed their surname to "Kay" while she was still a child. She had an older brother, Sidney, an older sister, Noëmi, and a younger brother Gilbert who died in childhood. She completed a degree in modern history in 1904 at Somerville College, Oxford, before becoming an inspector with the Ministry of Health, then in 1917 became the secretary to Henry Cavendish-Bentinck, Member of Parliament for Nottingham South. While working for Cavendish-Bentinck, she met Cecil Malone, Member of Parliament for Leyton East and the Communist Party of Great Britain's first MP. She and Malone married in 1921.

The L'Estrange Malones soon left the Communist Party and joined the Labour Party. In 1923, Leah became the first female chair of Poale Zion in the UK. In 1924, along with Frida Laski, Dora Russell and Dorothy Jewson she cofounded the Workers' Birth Control Group, which provided advice on birth control to working-class women. She worked with Dora Russell to successfully persuade the party to adopt a policy of making access to birth control easier. In 1934, she was elected to the London County Council, representing West Fulham, and in 1937 she was made an alderman. During her time on the council she served on various committees, including a period chairing the public assistance committee.

L'Estrange Malone died in 1951, while on holiday in Italy. She is buried at the Cimitero Monumentale di Staglieno in Genoa.
