= Summersby =

Summersby is a surname. Notable people with the surname include:

- Charles Summersby (1882–1961), British draper and Liberal National politician
- Kay Summersby (1908–1975), personal secretary to Dwight D. Eisenhower
- Roy Summersby (1935–2016), English footballer

== See also ==
- Sommersby
