= Hele's School, Exeter =

Location
- Hele Road (1850 to 1959); Quarry Lane (1959 to 1983); Quarry Lane (as St Peters 1983-); Exeter, Devon, EX2 5AP; England; 50.728°N 3.538°W

Information
- Type: Grammar School Comprehensive School
- Motto: Tentando Superabimus ("By braving, we shall overcome")
- Established: 1850
- Founder: From a bequest of Elize Hele
- Local authority: Exeter City Council to 1973; Devon County Council from 1973
- Gender: Boys
- Age: 11 to 18 (until 1973) 16 (from 1973)
- Houses: Pendennis, Powderham, Rougemont & Tintagel

Hele's School was a boys' grammar school, and latterly a comprehensive school, in the city of Exeter, Devon, England.

== Elize Hele’s bequest ==
Elize Hele was born in 1560 at Winston Manor near Plympton, Devon. He was a lawyer of the Inner Temple in London, had been treasurer to James I and was a major property owner in South and West Devon. Following the death of his only child, Walter, at the age of 11, Hele decided to bequeath a number of his estates for "some godly purposes and charitable uses". He died in 1635 and was buried in Exeter Cathedral.

In 1656 his trustees, Sir John Maynard and Elize Stert apportioned money for the foundation of the Blue Maid's Hospital (later renamed The Maynard School) and, in 1658 for the establishment of Hele's School in Plympton.

For nearly 200 years, the immediate descendants of Sir J. Maynard received the remaining income from the bequest and distributed it to private charities as they thought fit. Legal proceedings resulted in depriving the descendant of Sir J. Maynard (the surviving trustee) of all control over the funds, which were thereupon vested in the Crown.

== The first school ==
The Government made to the inhabitants of Exeter a grant of £1500 for the building of a boys' school, with a further £300 a year for its continual maintenance.

Hele's Endowed School opened on 15 January 1850 in Hele Road, St David's Exeter with a capacity for 88 boys who received instruction in reading, writing, arithmetic, mathematics, English grammar and history. Those under 10 years old paid 21s, and those over paid 42s per year.

The school buildings were extended in 1909 and in 1921 it came under the control of Exeter City Council. In 1931, further new buildings were added, designed by the City Architect. In 1938 plans were mooted to relocate the school to Quarry Lane in Heavitree, but these were put in abeyance due to the Second World War.

On 1 November 1938 the first School Squadron of the Air Cadet Defence Corps in Great Britain was founded at Hele's School as No.13 Squadron of the Air League. The squadron evolved into the school's combined cadet force.

In 1959, the school moved to a new site at Southam Farm, next to Quarry Lane, and the Hele Road site was taken over by Exeter College. During the summer of 2005, many of the old Hele's Buildings at Exeter College were demolished to make way for new facilities, although some of the Gothic Revival buildings from the 1850s remain.

== The second school ==
Work commenced on a new school building, designed by William (Bill) Chapple under the direction of Vinton Hall the city architect, in Quarry Lane in 1958 and the new school opened its doors on 1 September 1959. The school also took over the old army camp site used by Exeter Technical School on the other side of the Exeter by-pass. This became known as "The Annex" – a concrete footbridge over the by-pass (still standing) connected the two sites. The school was now Exeter's boys’ grammar school, entrance to which was by the Eleven plus exam. Bishop Blackall School was Exeter's girls’ grammar school.

The school war memorial, 13 feet wide and made of English oak designed by Harry Hems & Co., was relocated to the entrance of the main school hall.

=== Comprehensive ===
In 1973 control of the school passed from Exeter City Council to Devon County Council under local government reorganisation and Hele's School lost its status as a grammar school becoming a Comprehensive. The school's sixth form was also abolished, with pupils moving to Exeter College on completion of GCE O Levels.

=== Merger ===
In 1983 Hele's was merged with Bishop Blackall school on the Quarry Lane site and was renamed St Peter's (called St Peter's Church of England Aided School). Considerable remodelling of the school building took place and the Annex was abandoned and later demolished to make way for a housing development.

The main school buildings were demolished in 2005 to make way for a brand new St Peter's School building. The War Memorial was relocated to the balcony of the new school hall, along with a series of portraits of previous headmasters.

As a result of the rebuilding five oval solid oak library tables, which were made by the Harry Hems company in 1930 and presented to Hele's School in memory of its late Headmaster Mr F G Snowball, and funded by private subscription, were removed to Exeter School in 2006.

== Notable former pupils ==
- Michael Addison, 3rd Viscount Addison
- Donald Barber (1936-2000) – Astronomer
- Prof Anthony Barrett, FRS, FMedSci
- Sir Anthony Battishill, chairman of the Inland Revenue from 1986 to 1997, and of the Student Loans Company from 1998 to 2001
- Sir Edwin Chapman-Andrews CMG OBE, Ambassador to Sudan from 1956 to 1961 and to Lebanon from 1952 to 1956
- Frank Horne CBE, president from 1957 to 1958 of the British Grassland Society
- Prof W. G. Hoskins CBE (1908–92), president from 1972 to 1974 of the British Agricultural History Society
- Prof John Ingram, Professor of Dermatology from 1958 to 1963 at the University of Durham, president from 1947 to 1948 of the British Association of Dermatologists
- Sir Derek Jakeway CMG OBE, Governor of Fiji from 1964 to 1968
- Rev Cecil Northcott, editor from 1945 to 1970 of The Christian Century
- Louis Osman, architect, artist, goldsmith. Designer of the crown for the investiture of Charles, Prince of Wales
- William Palfrey CBE, Chief Constable of Lancashire Constabulary from 1969 to 1972
- Prof John Raymont OBE, Professor of Zoology from 1946 to 1978 at the University of Southampton
- Lieutenant General Sir Andrew Ridgway (1950- ), Lieutenant Governor of Jersey 2006-2011
- Air Vice-Marshal Harold Satterley CB CBE
- John Scott, England rugby international 1978-84
- Brian Sedgemore, Labour MP for Hackney South and Shoreditch from 1983 to 2005
- Sir Robert Taylor CBE, chairman of Thomas Tilling from 1976 to 1983
- Sir Hugh Tett (1907–2001) – chairman of Esso Petroleum from 1959 to 1967
- Derek Thomas CBE, chief executive of Surrey County Council from 1988 to 1995
- Prof Andrew Williams, D.Phil. MA MRSC (1937–2007) – University of Kent

== Old Heleans' Society ==
The Old Heleans' Society was founded in 1896 in London. It presently has a membership of over 500 and holds an annual dinner in Exeter in May and in London in October. An annual magazine is published in April, containing news, views, events etc.
