= Victor Collins =

Victor Collins may refer to:

- Victor Collins, Baron Stonham (1903–1971), British politician
- Victor Collins (General Hospital), a fictional character in the U.S. TV soap opera General Hospital
