= Ronald Brown (English politician) =

British politician

Member of Parliament for Hackney South and Shoreditch
- In office 10 October 1974 – 9 June 1983
- Preceded by: Constituency Established
- Succeeded by: Brian Sedgemore

Member of Parliament for Shoreditch and Finsbury
- In office 15 October 1964 – 28 February 1974
- Preceded by: Michael Cliffe
- Succeeded by: Constituency Abolished

Personal details
- Born: Ronald William Brown; 7 September 1921
- Died: 27 July 2002 (aged 80)
- Party: Labour Party (–1981); Social Democratic Party (1981–)
- Education: Borough Polytechnic

Ronald William Brown (7 September 1921 – 27 July 2002) was a British Labour Party politician. He was the younger brother of George Brown, interim Leader of the Labour Party in 1963.

Brown was educated in South London and at Borough Polytechnic. He served as a councillor on Camberwell Borough Council and was leader of the council. He was the first leader of the London Borough of Southwark from 1964, on which he served as an alderman.

Brown was first elected as Member of Parliament (MP) for Shoreditch and Finsbury at the 1964 general election. In 1966 he was challenged for his seat by the fascist Oswald Mosley (standing under the Union Movement), who had been interned without trial during the Second World War. Following boundary changes for the February 1974 election, Brown was elected for Hackney South and Shoreditch. After 1979 he was sometimes confused with the new Scottish Labour MP Ron Brown.

In 1981, Brown was among a number of Labour MPs who defected to the Social Democratic Party (his brother also indicated his support and later joined). He lost his seat at the 1983 general election, polling 18% of the vote behind the Labour candidate Brian Sedgemore (who defected to the Liberal Democrats himself in 2005). Brown died in 2002 aged 80.

Parliament of the United Kingdom
Preceded by Michael Cliffe	Member of Parliament for Shoreditch and Finsbury; 1964–February 1974	Constituency abolished
New constituency	Member of Parliament for Hackney South and Shoreditch; February 1974–1983	Succeeded by Brian Sedgemore
