= Viscount Addison =

Title in the Peerage of the United Kingdom

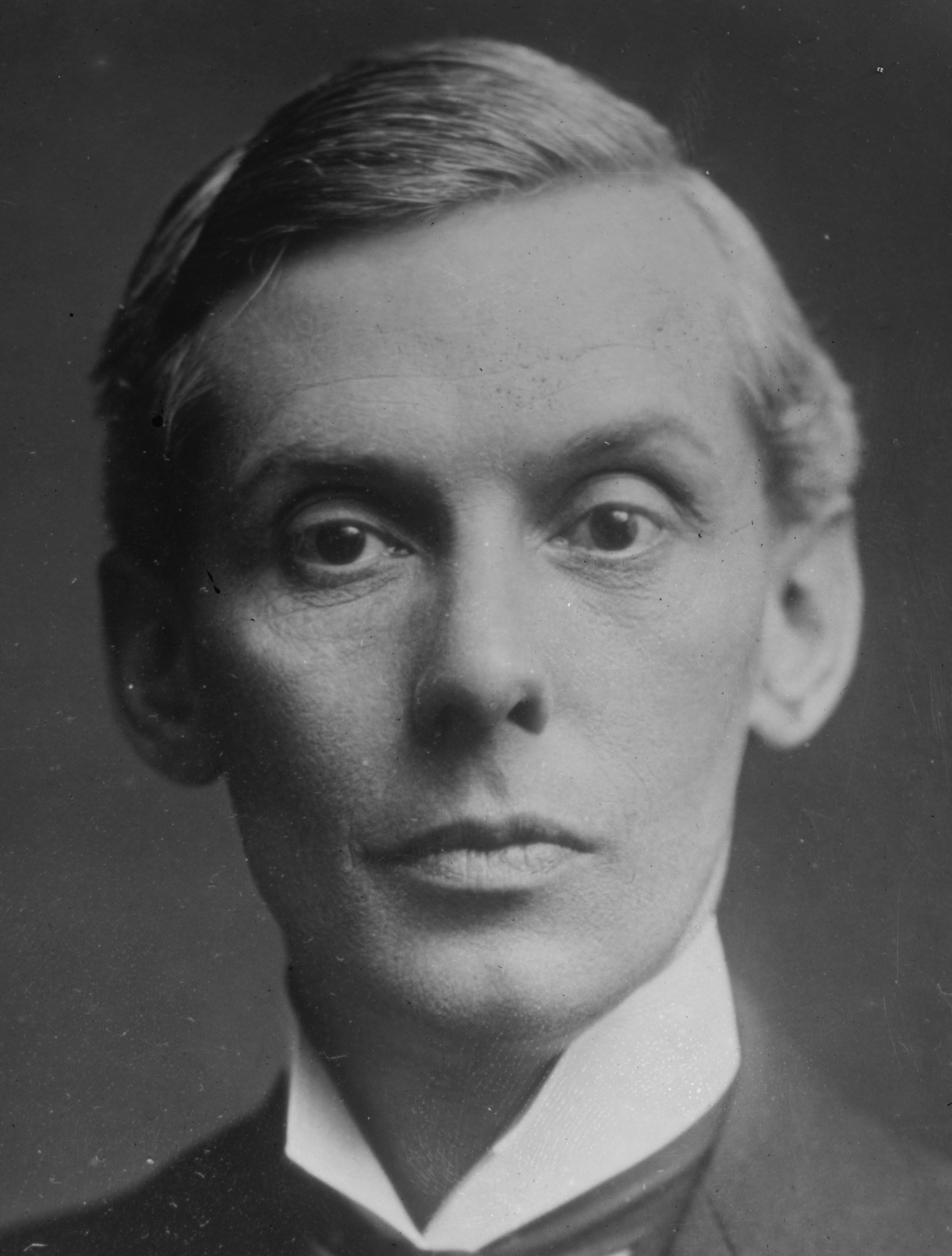
Christopher Addison, 1st Viscount Addison

Viscount Addison, of Stallingborough in the County of Lincoln, is a title in the Peerage of the United Kingdom. It was created on 6 July 1945 for the physician and politician Christopher Addison, 1st Baron Addison. He had already been created Baron Addison, of Stallingborough in the County of Lincoln, on 22 May 1937, also in the Peerage of the United Kingdom. As of 2017 the titles are held by his grandson, the fourth Viscount, who succeeded his father in 1992 (who in his turn had succeeded his elder brother in 1976).

The family seat is Churn Barn, near Oundle, Northamptonshire.

== Viscounts Addison (1945) ==
- Christopher Addison, 1st Viscount Addison (1869–1951)
- Christopher Addison, 2nd Viscount Addison (1904–1976)
- Michael Addison, 3rd Viscount Addison (1914–1992)
- William Matthew Wand Addison, 4th Viscount Addison (b. 1945)

The heir apparent and last in line to the peerage is the present holder's son the Hon. Paul Wand Addison (b. 1973).

== Arms ==
Coat of arms of Viscount Addison
Crest In front of two keys in saltire wards upwards a sword point downwards Or. Escutcheon Per chevron Vert and Or in chief a snake embowed head debruised between two garbs of the last and in base an anchor Sable. Supporters On either side a Lincolnshire red bull Proper the headstall also Proper charged with a sun in splendour Or. Motto Servire Est Vivere (To Serve Is To Live)
