= Frida Laski =

British activist (1884–1977)

Frida Kerry Laski (6 August 1884 – 31 July 1977) was a British suffragist, birth control advocate and eugenicist.

Born in Suffolk, England, Winifred Mary (Frida) Kerry, the daughter of Francis John Kerry of Acton Hall, Suffolk, a member of the British gentry, met the future Labour Party chairman and political science professor Harold Laski in Halesowen, where she was working as a physiotherapist and masseuse and he was recovering from surgery. After a brief courtship, Frida Kerry and Harold Laski, who was Jewish, ignored their family's objections and eloped to Scotland in 1911. She was eight years older than he was.

It was apparently a happy marriage, partly because the couple's shared beliefs in eugenics (the theory that the human race can be improved by improving its genetic quality by consciously-selective reproduction) and socialism. Both were also political activists, with Frida Laski especially active in feminist causes including suffrage and birth control. In 1920, she also converted to Judaism to please her husband's family, but she remained an atheist throughout her life. They collaborated on several projects including the English translation of Léon Duguit's Law in the Modern State (1919).

After a stint at Oxford, where Harold Laski got his degree, the couple moved to Montreal, where he had a lectureship at McGill University. They had one child, a daughter, Diana (1916-1969). In 1917, the family moved to Cambridge, Massachusetts, where Harold taught at Harvard. In 1920, the Laskis moved back to London, where Harold taught at the London School of Economics and Frida became active in birth control work. She helped form the Workers' Birth Control Group (WBCG) with Dora Russell, Stella Browne and Dorothy Thurtle in 1924. In 1932, she became active in the Birth Control International Information Centre as a member of its London Council. In 1934, she threw herself into politics, working in Fulham for the Labour Party, and agitating for the adoption of birth control into the party platforms. In 1936, she became one of the founders of the Abortion Law Reform Association.

After spending the autumn of 1938 to the summer of 1939 in the United States, as Harold Laski took a temporary post at the University of Washington, the couple returned to Cambridge, England, to where the London School of Economics was evacuated during World War II.

After Harold Laski died in 1950, Frida Laski devoted herself to Third World issues and focused particularly on hunger. She died in London on 31 July 1977, at age 93.

== Sources ==
- Frida K. Laski Oral History Interview - JFK #1, 8/5/1966, John F. Kennedy Presidential Library and Museum
- Banks, Olive. The Biographical Dictionary of British Feminists. Volume Two: A supplement, 1900-1945 (New York, 1990)
- Lamb, Peter.Harold Laski: Problems of Democracy, The Sovereign State, and International Society (New York, 2004)
- Laski, Frida. 'Rewarding Experiment,' The Times (London, England), Aug 06, 1958; pg. 9.
- Martin, Kingsley. Harold Laski (1893-1950: A Biographical Memoir (New York, 1953)
- Newman, Michael. 'Laski, Harold Joseph (1893–1950)’, Oxford Dictionary of National Biography, Oxford University Press, 2004; online edn, Jan 2011 , <accessed May 3, 2013>)
- Obituary. The Times (London, England), Aug 10, 1977; pg. 16.
- Papers of Harold and Frida Laski, 1910-1969, Hull History Centre (Hull University Archives)
- Harold Laski to Roscoe Pound, Dec. 28, 1920, Correspondence 1920, Roscoe Pound Papers, Manuscript Division, Harvard University
- Rubinstein, David. Frida Laski 1884-1977: feminism, socialism and the developing world (London, 2003).
- John Saville. "Mrs Frida Laski." Times [London, England] 10 Aug. 1977; pg. 16.
