= Christopher Addison, 1st Viscount Addison =

British politician (1869–1951)

The Right Honourable The Viscount Addison KG PC FRCS
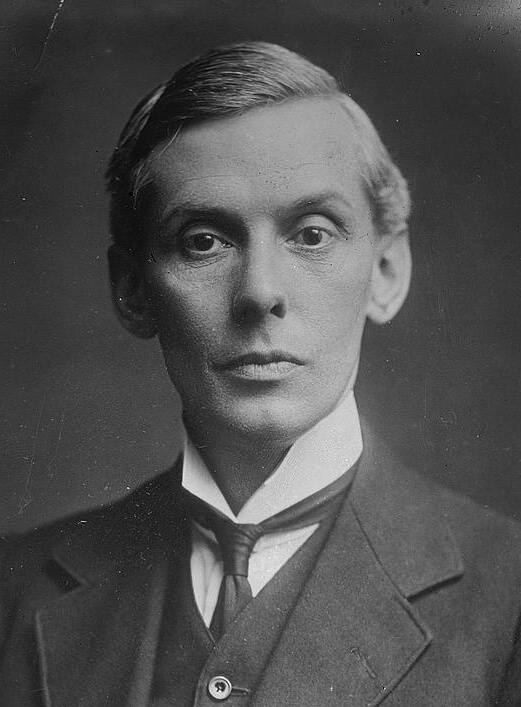
- Addison, c. 1915–1920

Leader of the House of Lords
- In office 3 August 1945 – 26 October 1951
- Monarch: George VI
- Prime Minister: Clement Attlee
- Preceded by: Viscount Cranborne
- Succeeded by: The Marquess of Salisbury

Lord President of the Council
- In office 9 March 1951 – 26 October 1951
- Monarch: George VI
- Prime Minister: Clement Attlee
- Preceded by: Herbert Morrison
- Succeeded by: The Lord Woolton

Lord Keeper of the Privy Seal
- In office 7 October 1947 – 9 March 1951
- Monarch: George VI
- Prime Minister: Clement Attlee
- Preceded by: The Lord Inman
- Succeeded by: Ernest Bevin

Paymaster General
- In office 2 July 1948 – 1 April 1949
- Monarch: George VI
- Prime Minister: Clement Attlee
- Preceded by: Hilary Marquand
- Succeeded by: Gordon Macdonald

Secretary of State for Commonwealth Relations
- In office 7 July 1947 – 7 October 1947
- Monarch: George VI
- Prime Minister: Clement Attlee
- Preceded by: Himself (as Secretary of State for Dominion Affairs)
- Succeeded by: Philip Noel-Baker

Secretary of State for Dominion Affairs
- In office 3 August 1945 – 7 July 1947
- Monarch: George VI
- Prime Minister: Clement Attlee
- Preceded by: Viscount Cranborne
- Succeeded by: Himself (as Secretary of State for Commonwealth Relations)

Minister of Agriculture
- In office 5 June 1930 – 24 August 1931
- Monarch: George V
- Prime Minister: Ramsay MacDonald
- Preceded by: Noel Buxton
- Succeeded by: Sir John Gilmour

Parliamentary Secretary to the Ministry of Agriculture and Fisheries
- In office 4 June 1929 – 5 June 1930
- Monarch: George V
- Prime Minister: Ramsay MacDonald
- Preceded by: George Rous
- Succeeded by: Herbrand Sackville

Minister without portfolio
- In office 1 April 1921 – 14 July 1921
- Monarch: George V
- Prime Minister: David Lloyd George
- Preceded by: Laming Worthington-Evans
- Succeeded by: Anthony Eden

Minister of Health
- In office 24 June 1919 – 1 April 1921
- Monarch: George V
- Prime Minister: David Lloyd George
- Preceded by: office established Himself (as President of the Local Government Board)
- Succeeded by: Alfred Mond

President of the Local Government Board
- In office 10 January 1919 – 24 June 1919
- Monarch: George V
- Prime Minister: David Lloyd George
- Preceded by: Auckland Geddes
- Succeeded by: office abolished Himself (as Minister of Health)

Minister of Reconstruction
- In office 17 July 1917 – 10 January 1919
- Monarch: George V
- Prime Minister: David Lloyd George
- Preceded by: office established
- Succeeded by: Auckland Geddes

Minister of Munitions
- In office 10 December 1916 – 17 July 1917
- Monarch: George V
- Prime Minister: David Lloyd George
- Preceded by: Edwin Montagu
- Succeeded by: Winston Churchill

Member of the House of Lords Lord Temporal
- In office 22 May 1937 – 11 December 1951 as a hereditary peer
- Preceded by: Peerage created
- Succeeded by: The 2nd Viscount Addison

Member of Parliament for Swindon
- In office 25 October 1934 – 14 November 1935
- Preceded by: Reginald Mitchell Banks
- Succeeded by: Wavell Wakefield
- In office 30 May 1929 – 27 October 1931
- Preceded by: Reginald Mitchell Banks
- Succeeded by: Reginald Mitchell Banks

Member of Parliament for Shoreditch Hoxton (1910–1918)
- In office 10 January 1910 – 15 November 1922
- Preceded by: Claude Hay
- Succeeded by: Ernest Griffith Price

Personal details
- Born: 19 June 1869 Hogsthorpe, Lincolnshire
- Died: 11 December 1951 (aged 82)
- Party: Labour (after 1922); Liberal (until 1922)
- Spouses: Isobel Gray (m. 1902; died 1934) Beatrice Low (m. 1937)
- Education: University of London
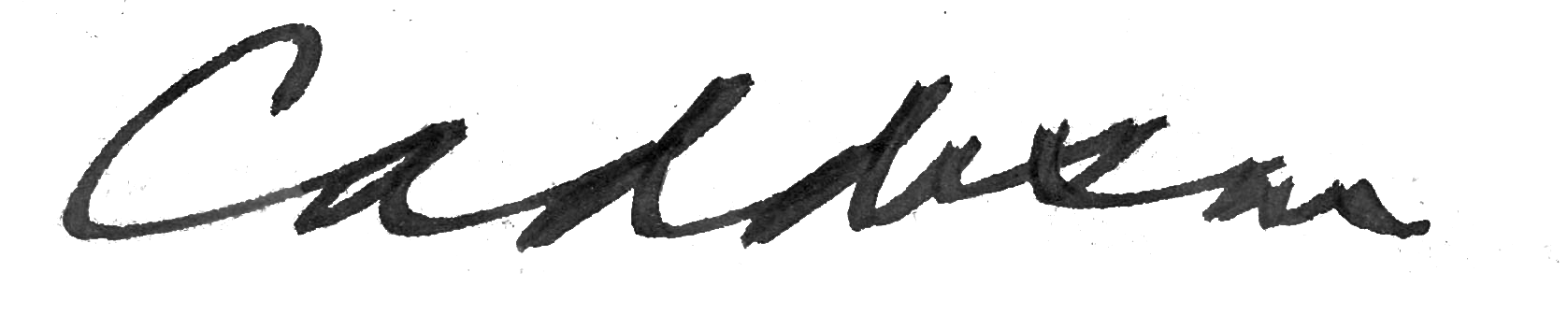
- Signature

Christopher Addison, 1st Viscount Addison (19 June 1869 – 11 December 1951), was a British medical doctor and politician. A member of the Liberal and Labour parties, he served as Minister of Munitions during the First World War and was later Minister of Health under David Lloyd George and Leader of the House of Lords under Clement Attlee.

He was a prominent anatomist and perhaps the most eminent doctor ever to enter the Commons. He was a leader in issues of health, wartime munitions, housing and agriculture. Although not highly visible, he played a major role in the post war governments after both world wars. Addison worked hard to promote the National Insurance Act 1911. Lloyd George made him the first Minister of Health when the ministry was created in 1919, and Addison oversaw an expansion of council housing after the Great War with an increase in public funding to local authority housing schemes with the Housing, Town Planning, &c. Act 1919. He later joined the Labour Party.

== Background and education ==
Addison was born in the rural parish of Hogsthorpe in Lincolnshire, the son of Robert Addison and Susan, daughter of Charles Fanthorpe. His family had owned and run a farm for several generations and he maintained a strong interest in agriculture and rural matters throughout his life. He attended Trinity College, Harrogate, from the age of thirteen. He trained in medicine at Sheffield School of Medicine and St Bartholomew's Hospital in London. His education was expensive for his family, and he insisted on re-paying his parents once he had begun his career.

In 1892, Addison graduated from the University of London as a Bachelor of Medicine and Science with honours in forensic medicine. A year later he qualified as a Medical Doctor and two years after that he was elected a Fellow of the Royal College of Surgeons. He combined private practice with academic research, and taught anatomy at Sheffield School of Medicine. In 1896 he became professor of anatomy at the newly formed University College of Sheffield, and edited the Quarterly Medical Journal from 1898 to 1901. In 1901, he moved to London again, teaching at Charing Cross Hospital. He published his research on anatomy and became Hunterian professor with the Royal College of Surgeons.

Addison's principal contributions to anatomy were in his writings in three volumes of the Journal of Anatomy, 1899–1901, "On the topographical anatomy of the abdominal viscera in man". Subsequently, he contributed to the three-dimensional mapping of the abdomen, which was based on numerous bodily measurements, "some 10,000 measurements made on forty bodies". He linked his measurements to an imaginary plane of section, known as "Addison's transpyloric plane".

== Political career ==
=== 1907–1914 ===
Motivated by concern for the treatment of the poor, and that the effects of poverty on health could be fought only by governments, not by doctors, Addison entered politics. He was adopted as Liberal candidate for Hoxton, Shoreditch, in 1907, and was duly elected in the January 1910 general election.

The Chancellor of the Exchequer, David Lloyd George, noted Addison's medical background and asked him to speak in support of the 1911 National Insurance Bill, both in Parliament and with the British Medical Association. In August 1914, he was appointed Parliamentary Secretary to the Board of Education, under Jack Pease. His work here was largely concerned with improving the health and welfare of children, but was cut short following the outbreak of the First World War.

=== World War ===
Addison became Parliamentary Secretary to the Ministry of Munitions in May 1915.

Addison introduced a degree of intervention in the free market known as "War Socialism" to prompt faster munitions production. Private enterprise in key sectors was brought under the control of government, which erected its own factories, and great care was taken to improve the welfare of the munitions workers, both male and female. Ammunition supply-lines dictated the tempo of the war, especially in the first year of fighting, so stability and productivity within this industry were of the utmost importance. The government subsidised housing estates, such as Vickerstown on Walney Island (now in Cumbria), with integral religious, social and recreational amenities, to enable pools of munitions workers and their families to move next to expanded armament factories. Raymond Unwin, an influential civil servant from this time injected some of the late Victorian/utopian/Fabian philosophy of garden suburbs and ideals from the cheap cottages movement launched in 1905.

With hindsight, this may be seen as something of a prototype of the municipal housing that followed in the post-war period and the beginnings of town planning as an accepted concern of the state. Fellow idealists might well have regretted the design, layout and landscaping compromises inevitably struck in the pursuit of rapid construction to support homeland defence as an over-riding priority. Improved dimensions of kitchens, bathrooms and gardens for working-class houses might also be seen as a response to a more equal valuation of women as competent industrial workers and a political force.

The Ministry of Munitions was a new Ministry, created and headed by David Lloyd George to rapidly improve and increase production of munitions. Working conditions were improved in the new, state-owned industry, and Addison created and implemented schemes that greatly increased the efficiency of production. He became a Privy Counsellor and was promoted to Minister of Munitions when Lloyd George became Minister of War in July 1916. He supported Lloyd George against the Prime Minister, H. H. Asquith, at the end of 1916, and continued into the new coalition cabinet.

=== Postwar planning ===
In July 1917, he became a Minister Without Portfolio with responsibility for analysing the problems that Britain would face after the war and preparing plans for reconstruction. He worked with Arthur Greenwood to develop programmes for sweeping social reforms. Perhaps Addison's greatest achievement was the establishment of a costing system which by the end of the war had saved an estimated £440 million. Addison's Hoxton constituency was abolished for the 1918 general election, when he was elected for the new Shoreditch constituency.

Although Lloyd George was increasingly influenced by the Conservative members of his coalition government, Addison's plans formed the basis of much post-war legislation. Addison became President of the Local Government Board in January 1919, with the goal of transforming it into a Ministry of Health. He became the first Minister of Health in June following the passing of the Ministry of Health Act 1919. He was responsible for a great deal of public health improvements and social legislation. He ensured the extension of health and hospital services: increasing the treatment provision for communicable diseases such as venereal diseases and tuberculosis; increasing provision for maternal health and infant welfare as well as home nursing.

He introduced the Nurse Registration Act 1919, establishing for the first time a register of nurses under the auspices of the General Nursing Council. He introduced the Housing, Town Planning, &c. Act 1919, under which the state built homes for low rents (council houses) for the working-class. Addison also reviewed and increased the provisions of the National Insurance system, and introduced programmes to improve healthcare and training. He presided over large increases in public spending and this raised the ire of Conservatives in the government. He was moved from the Ministry of Health in April 1921, becoming Minister Without Portfolio. Addison resigned in July 1921 when a Cabinet committee decided to halt the housing construction scheme; he became a strong critic of the government.

=== 1922–1937 ===
Addison lost his seat in the 1922 general election. Since the end of the war, he had found himself increasingly detached from both factions of the Liberal Party. His belief in social reform and progressive policies brought him close to the socialism of the Labour Party, and he campaigned for Labour candidates at the 1923 general election.

During this time he returned to his family farm and published a number of books, including The Betrayal of the Slums, on the link between poor housing and poor health, and Practical Socialism. He stood unsuccessfully as Labour's candidate in the constituency of Hammersmith South for the 1924 general election, before winning the Swindon constituency in Wiltshire, at the 1929 general election. Ramsay MacDonald appointed Addison as Parliamentary Secretary to the Ministry of Agriculture in 1929. He served under Noel Buxton, and succeeded him as Minister of Agriculture in June 1930. He worked with Clement Attlee, the future Leader of the Labour party, with whom he formed a close relationship and was an active member of the Socialist Medical Association.

Facing economic crisis in 1931, the Chancellor of the Exchequer, Philip Snowden, proposed swingeing cuts to public spending, particularly to unemployment benefit. Addison voted against these cuts in cabinet and went into Opposition when MacDonald formed a National Government with the Conservatives and Liberals. Addison lost his seat at the 1931 general election. In 1934 he regained his Swindon seat in a by-election, but lost it a second time at the 1935 general election. During the Spanish Civil War he helped organise medical aid to Spain, as president of the Spanish Medical Aid Committee.

=== 1937–1951 ===
In May 1937, Addison joined the Labour party's meagre caucus in the House of Lords, being raised to the peerage as Baron Addison, of Stallingborough in the County of Lincoln. He was Chairman of the Buckinghamshire War Agricultural Committee during the Second World War, co-ordinating agricultural production and supply in that county. Attlee appointed Addison to be Labour's leader in the Lords in 1940, after Lord Snell stepped down for health reasons. Addison retained this position until his death, serving as Leader of the House of Lords following Labour's victory in the 1945 general election. He was created Viscount Addison, of Stallingborough in the County of Lincoln, in July 1945.

As Leader of the House of Lords, Addison had the key responsibility of steering government legislation through the upper chamber. He formed a good relationship with the leader of the Conservative opposition in the Lords, the Marquess of Salisbury. Through general consultation, Addison developed new guidelines for peers, particularly with regard to declaration of interests. He was also Secretary of State for Dominion Affairs in Attlee's first cabinet, directing the transformation of the Dominion Affairs Office into the Office of Commonwealth Relations and playing an instrumental role in Labour's early anti-imperialist policies and the strengthening of the British Commonwealth. In 1946, he became the first Labour politician to be made a Knight of the Garter. As his health began to deteriorate he withdrew from foreign affairs in 1947, subsequently holding a number of sinecure positions in combination with his leadership of the Lords, until Labour lost office in October 1951. As a result of Addison's success in steering legislation through the House of Lords, the Attlee ministry issued few major reforms to the institution beyond limiting its delaying power to one year during its time in power.

== Family ==
Lord Addison married first Isobel Mackinnon Gray in 1902. Isobel, the daughter of a wealthy Scottish businessman and shipping agent, Archibald Gray, supported her husband morally and financially when he embarked upon a career in politics and was involved in charitable causes in Shoreditch and Swindon. They had two daughters and three sons:

- Hon. Elizabeth Kate (21 December 1902 – 8 July 1967), married in 1935 Edward Worsley Ashcroft, brother of actress Dame Peggy Ashcroft
- Christopher Addison, 2nd Viscount Addison (1904–1976), succeeded his father in his titles
- Hon. Isobel Gray (20 January 1907 – 5 April 1989), married in 1932 Nicholas Cheshire, son of Francis Augustus Cheshire
- Paul Fanthorpe (7 September 1909 – 11 April 1912), died in childhood
- Michael Addison, 3rd Viscount Addison (1914–1992), succeeded his brother

After Isobel's death in 1934, Addison married secondly Dorothy, daughter of Frederick Percy Low, in 1937. Lord Addison died in December 1951, aged 82, only two months after the end of his political career. He was succeeded in his titles by his eldest son, Christopher. Lady Addison died in September 1982.

== Selected publications ==
Addison wrote an important paper, "On the Topographical Anatomy of the Abdominal Viscera in Man, especially the Gastro-Intestinal Canal", that was published in four parts in the Journal of Anatomy and Physiology between 1899 and 1901:

- Part I. July 1899, Vol. 33 (Part 4), 565.5.
- Part II. July 1900, Vol. 34 (Part 4), 427–450.9.
- Part III. January 1901, Vol. 35 (Part 2), 166–204.11.
- Part IV. April 1901, Vol. 35 (Part 3), 277–304.9.

== Commemoration ==
Addison cut the first sod for Bristol City Council's new Sea Mills estate on 4 June 1919. An oak tree was planted by city's lady mayoress as part of the same event, it survives and is known as the Addison Tree. Over 90 streets are named after Addison across Britain, all in areas of social housing.

== Arms ==
Coat of arms of Christopher Addison, 1st Viscount Addison
Crest In front of two keys in saltire wards upwards a sword point downwards Or. Escutcheon Per chevron Vert and Or in chief a snake embowed head debruised between two garbs of the last and in base an anchor Sable. Supporters On either side a Lincolnshire red bull Proper the headstall also Proper charged with a sun in splendour Or. Motto Servire Est Vivere (To Serve Is To Live)

== See also ==
- People's Union for Economy

Parliament of the United Kingdom
Preceded by Claude Hay	Member of Parliament for Hoxton; January 1910 – 1918	Constituency abolished
New constituency	Member of Parliament for Shoreditch; 1918–1922	Succeeded by Ernest Griffith Price
Preceded by Reginald Mitchell Banks	Member of Parliament for Swindon; 1929–1931	Succeeded by Reginald Mitchell Banks
Preceded by Reginald Mitchell Banks	Member of Parliament for Swindon; 1934–1935	Succeeded by Wavell Wakefield
Political offices
Preceded by Charles Trevelyan	Parliamentary Secretary to the Board of Education; 1914–1915	Succeeded by Herbert Lewis
New office	Parliamentary Secretary to the Ministry of Munitions; 1915–1916	Succeeded by Arthur Lee
Preceded by Edwin Montagu	Minister of Munitions; 1916–1917	Succeeded by Winston Churchill
New office	Minister of Reconstruction; 1917–1919	Succeeded by Auckland Geddes
Preceded by Auckland Geddes	President of the Local Government Board; 1919	Office abolished
New office	Minister of Health; 1919–1921	Succeeded by Sir Alfred Mond
Vacant	Minister without Portfolio; 1921	Vacant
Preceded by The Earl of Stradbroke	Parliamentary Secretary to the Ministry of Agriculture and Fisheries; 1929–1930	Succeeded by The Earl De La Warr
Preceded by Noel Buxton	Minister of Agriculture; 1930–1931	Succeeded by Sir John Gilmour
Preceded by Viscount Cranborne	Secretary of State for Dominion Affairs; 1945–1947	Succeeded by Philip Noel-Baker
Preceded by Viscount Cranborne	Leader of the House of Lords; 1945–1951	Succeeded by The Marquess of Salisbury
Preceded by The Lord Inman	Lord Privy Seal; 1947–1951	Succeeded by Ernest Bevin
Preceded by Hilary Marquand	Paymaster General; 1948–1949	Succeeded by The Lord Macdonald of Gwaenysgor
Preceded by Herbert Morrison	Lord President of the Council; 1951	Succeeded by The Lord Woolton
Party political offices
Preceded by Clement Attlee	Chairman of the New Fabian Research Bureau; 1934–1937	Succeeded by G. D. H. Cole
Preceded by The Lord Snell	Leader of the Labour Party in the House of Lords; 1940–1951	Succeeded by The Earl Jowitt
Peerage of the United Kingdom
New creation	Viscount Addison; 1945–1951	Succeeded by Christopher Addison
New creation	Baron Addison; 1937–1951; Member of the House of Lords (1937–1951)	Succeeded by Christopher Addison
