= Shoreditch (UK Parliament constituency) =

Parliamentary constituency in the United Kingdom, 1918–1950

- Former borough constituency for the House of Commons
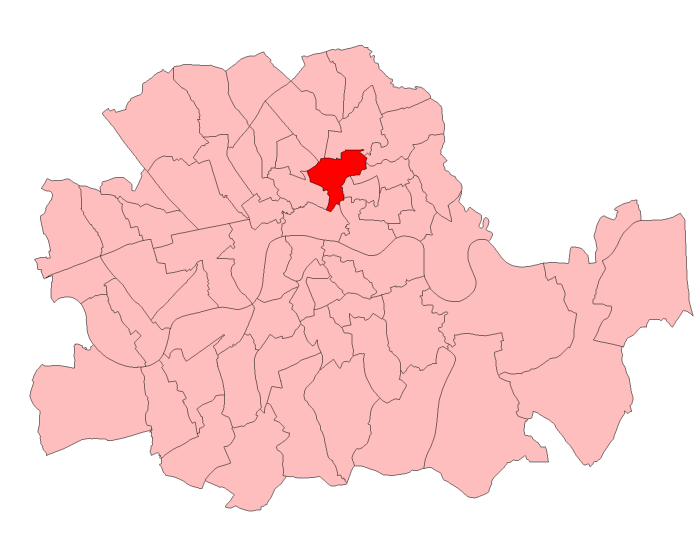
- Shoreditch in London
- County: London

1918–1950
- Seats: One
- Created from: Haggerston and Hoxton
- Replaced by: Shoreditch & Finsbury

Shoreditch was a parliamentary constituency centred on the Shoreditch district of the East End of London. It returned one Member of Parliament (MP) to the House of Commons of the Parliament of the United Kingdom, elected by the first-past-the-post voting system.

The constituency was created for the 1918 general election, and abolished for the 1950 general election, when it was partly replaced by the new Shoreditch and Finsbury constituency.

== Boundaries ==
Throughout its existence, the constituency's boundaries were contiguous with those of the Metropolitan Borough of Shoreditch.

== Members of Parliament ==
Year	Member	Whip
1918	Christopher Addison	Coalition Liberal
Jan 1922	Christopher Addison	National Liberal
Jul 1922	Christopher Addison	Liberal
1922	Ernest Griffith Price	National Liberal
Nov 1923	Ernest Griffith Price	Liberal
Dec 1923	Ernest Thurtle	Labour
1931	Charles Summersby	Liberal National
1935	Ernest Thurtle	Labour
1950	constituency abolished	

== Election results ==
=== Election in the 1910s ===
Chancellor

General election 1918: Shoreditch
Party		Candidate	Votes	%
C	National Liberal	Christopher Addison	9,532	55.9
	Unionist	Robert Sievier	3,414	20.0
	National Amalgamated Coal Workers' Union (Labour)	Alfred Walton	2,072	12.2
	Liberal	Henry Chancellor	1,524	8.9
	National	Thomas Warwick	504	3.0
Majority			6,118	35.9
Turnout			17,046	37.3
	National Liberal win (new seat)			
C indicates candidate endorsed by the coalition government.

=== Election in the 1920s ===
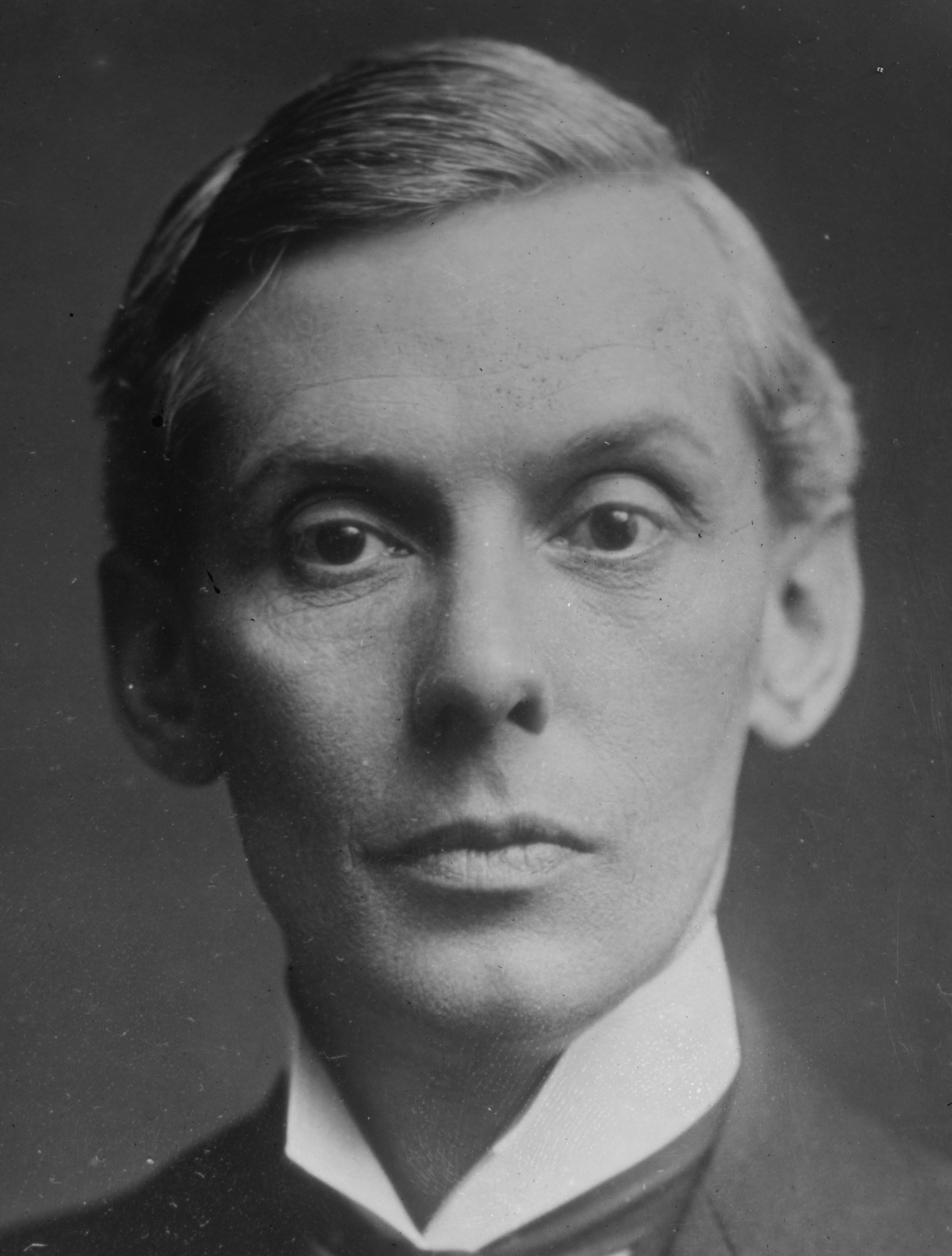
Addison

General election 1922: Shoreditch
Party	Candidate	Votes	%	±%
National Liberal	Ernest Griffith Price	9,084	37.6	–18.3
Labour	Ernest Thurtle	8,834	36.5	+24.3
Liberal	Christopher Addison	6,273	25.9	+17.0
Majority		250	1.1	−34.8
Turnout		24,191	47.4	+10.1
National Liberal hold		Swing		

General election 1923: Shoreditch
Party	Candidate	Votes	%	±%
Labour	Ernest Thurtle	13,874	56.6	+20.1
Liberal	Ernest Griffith Price	10,658	43.4	+17.5
Majority		3,216	13.2	N/A
Turnout		24,532	47.4	0.0
Labour gain from National Liberal		Swing	+1.3	

General election 1924: Shoreditch
Party	Candidate	Votes	%	±%
Labour	Ernest Thurtle	16,608	53.0	−3.6
Liberal	Harold Reckitt	14,748	47.0	+3.6
Majority		1,860	6.0	−7.2
Turnout		31,356	59.5	+12.1
Labour hold		Swing	−3.6	

General election 1929: Shoreditch
Party	Candidate	Votes	%	±%
Labour	Ernest Thurtle	20,552	51.5	−1.5
Liberal	Harold Reckitt	12,981	32.6	−13.6
Unionist	Antony Bulwer-Lytton	6,334	15.9	New
Majority		7,571	18.9	+12.9
Turnout		39,867	64.3	+4.8
Labour hold		Swing	+6.4	

=== Election in the 1930s ===
General election 1931: Shoreditch
Party	Candidate	Votes	%	±%
National Liberal	Charles Summersby	19,596	56.7	+40.8
Labour	Ernest Thurtle	14,988	43.3	−8.2
Majority		4,608	13.4	N/A
Turnout		34,584	55.9	−8.6
National Liberal gain from Labour		Swing		

General election 1935: Shoreditch
Party	Candidate	Votes	%	±%
Labour	Ernest Thurtle	18,602	61.4	+18.1
National Liberal	Somerset Stopford Brooke	11,673	38.6	−18.1
Majority		6,929	22.8	N/A
Turnout		30,275	51.9	−4.0
Labour gain from National Liberal		Swing	+18.1	

=== Election in the 1940s ===
General Election 1939–40

Another General Election was required to take place before the end of 1940. The political parties had been making preparations for an election to take place and by the Autumn of 1939, the following candidates had been selected;

- Labour: Ernest Thurtle
- Liberal National: James Houseman
- British Union: Michael Goulding

General election 1945: Shoreditch
Party	Candidate	Votes	%	±%
Labour	Ernest Thurtle	11,592	74.0	+12.6
National Liberal	Frederick L Boult	4,081	26.0	−12.6
Majority		7,511	48.0	+25.2
Turnout		15,673	57.6	+2.7
Labour hold		Swing	+6.3	
