= Shoreditch and Finsbury =

Parliamentary constituency in the United Kingdom, 1950–1974

- Former borough constituency for the House of Commons
- County: Greater London

1950–1974
- Seats: One
- Created from: Shoreditch; Finsbury
- Replaced by: Islington South & Finsbury; Hackney South & Shoreditch

Shoreditch and Finsbury was a parliamentary constituency centred on the Shoreditch district of the East End of London and the adjacent Finsbury area. It returned one Member of Parliament (MP) to the House of Commons of the Parliament of the United Kingdom, using the first-past-the-post system of voting.

The constituency was created for the 1950 general election, partially replacing the previous Shoreditch and Finsbury constituencies, which had seen a significant fall in population.

Shoreditch and Finsbury was itself abolished for the February 1974 general election, when its territory was divided between two new constituencies: Islington South & Finsbury and Hackney South & Shoreditch.

== Boundaries ==
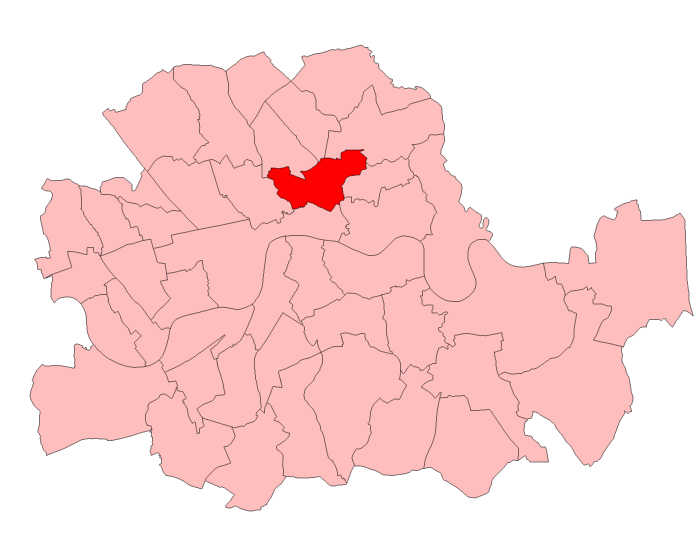
Shoreditch and Finsbury in London 1950-74

The constituency consisted of the Metropolitan Borough of Shoreditch and the Metropolitan Borough of Finsbury. In 1965, Shoreditch was absorbed into the London Borough of Hackney and Finsbury into the London Borough of Islington; however the constituency boundaries remained unchanged until the seat disappeared in 1974.

== Members of Parliament ==
Election	Member	Party	Notes
1950	Ernest Thurtle	Labour	Died in office August 1954
1954 by-election	Victor Collins	Labour	Resigned August 1958 on being raised to the peerage
1958 by-election	Michael Cliffe	Labour	
1964	Ronald Brown	Labour	
Feb 1974	constituency abolished		

== Election results ==
=== Elections in the 1950s ===
General election 1950: Shoreditch and Finsbury
Party	Candidate	Votes	%	±%
Labour	Ernest Thurtle	22,150	53.2	
Conservative	Geoffrey Rippon	7,879	18.6	
Labour Independent Group	John Platts-Mills	7,602	18.0	
Liberal	George Hensher	4,297	10.4	
Majority		14,631	34.6	
Turnout		41,928	73.4	
Labour win (new seat)				

General election 1951: Shoreditch and Finsbury
Party	Candidate	Votes	%	±%
Labour	Ernest Thurtle	30,162	72.6	+19.4
Conservative	Geoffrey Rippon	11,399	27.4	+8.8
Majority		18,763	45.2	+10.6
Turnout		41,561	73.2	−0.2
Labour hold		Swing		

1954 Shoreditch and Finsbury by-election
Party	Candidate	Votes	%	±%
Labour	Victor Collins	18,082	78.19	+5.6
Conservative	Malcolm Agnew	5,043	21.81	−5.6
Majority		13,039	56.38	+11.2
Turnout		23,125		
Labour hold		Swing		

General election 1955: Shoreditch and Finsbury
Party	Candidate	Votes	%	±%
Labour	Victor Collins	25,500	73.4	+0.8
Conservative	Malcolm Agnew	9,216	26.5	−0.9
Majority		16,284	46.9	+1.7
Turnout		34,716	77.4	+4.2
Labour hold		Swing		

1958 Shoreditch and Finsbury by-election
Party	Candidate	Votes	%	±%
Labour	Michael Cliffe	10,215	76.04	+2.59
Conservative	Thomas Whipham	3,219	23.96	−2.59
Majority		6996	52.08	+5.18
Turnout		13,434		
Labour hold		Swing		

General election 1959: Shoreditch and Finsbury
Party	Candidate	Votes	%	±%
Labour	Michael Cliffe	22,744	67.0	−6.4
Conservative	Thomas Whipham	11,178	33.0	+6.5
Majority		11,566	34.0	−12.9
Turnout		33,922	34.1	−43.3
Labour hold		Swing		

=== Elections in the 1960s ===
General election 1964: Shoreditch and Finsbury
Party	Candidate	Votes	%	±%
Labour	Ronald Brown	18,207	68.4	+1.4
Conservative	Roger J L Bramble	8,412	31.6	−1.4
Majority		9,795	36.8	+2.8
Turnout		26,619	55.7	+21.6
Labour hold		Swing		

General election 1966: Shoreditch and Finsbury
Party	Candidate	Votes	%	±%
Labour	Ronald Brown	17,456	71.1	+2.7
Conservative	Roger Sims	5,957	24.3	−7.3
Union Movement	Oswald Mosley	1,126	4.6	New
Majority		11,499	46.9	+10.1
Turnout		24,519	53.5	−2.2
Labour hold		Swing	+5.0	

=== Elections in the 1970s ===
General election 1970: Shoreditch and Finsbury
Party	Candidate	Votes	%	±%
Labour	Ronald Brown	14,474	66.9	−4.2
Conservative	Roger Sims	7,166	33.1	+8.8
Majority		7,308	33.8	−13.1
Turnout		21,640	48.7	−4.8
Labour hold		Swing		
