= Michael Cliffe =

British clothing industry worker and politician

Member of Parliament for Shoreditch and Finsbury
- In office 27 November 1958 – 9 August 1964
- Preceded by: Victor Collins
- Succeeded by: Ronald Brown

Personal details
- Born: Myer Cliffe; 6 March 1903 Sheffield, West Riding of Yorkshire, England
- Died: 9 August 1964 (aged 61) Smithfield, City of London, England
- Party: Labour

Michael Cliffe (6 March 1903 – 9 August 1964) was a British clothing industry worker and politician, who was a Member of Parliament in inner London for six years.

== Working life ==
Cliffe was born in Sheffield and went to Holliscroft School, leaving to go into the clothing industry as a tailor's presser. He was active in the National Union of Tailors and Garment Workers and was elected to the Union's National Executive. He moved to London to live in Finsbury where he became active in local politics as a member of the Labour Party; in 1949 he was elected to Finsbury Borough Council from West Finsbury ward, at the top of the poll in a six-member ward. On the last day of 1952 he formally adopted the first name 'Michael' by deed poll.

== Municipal experience ==
After local ward boundary changes, Cliffe was elected in Central ward from 1953, but then was elected an Alderman (his wife Sophia, née Whitesman, followed him onto the council); he remained an Alderman until his death. He was chairman of the Housing Committee, and when the building work was completed he was allocated a flat in the Golden Lane Estate. He was chosen as Mayor of Finsbury for the year 1956-1957 and was then Chairman of the Policy and Resources Committee (the unofficial Leader of the Council).

== Byelection ==
As Chairman of Shoreditch and Finsbury Constituency Labour Party when the local Member of Parliament Victor Collins took a life peerage in the first appointments in 1958, Cliffe was selected as his successor as Labour candidate for the constituency of Shoreditch and Finsbury. Despite a rumbustious campaign in which the police had to be called to one of his meetings and arrested four men, Cliffe comfortably retained the seat on a low turnout in the byelection.

== Parliamentary life ==
A quiet and rare speaker in the House of Commons, Cliffe was active in supporting his constituents. He joined a delegation to the Home Secretary from the Street Bookmakers' Federation in 1960, saying he wanted to be better informed of their views in advance of the debate on a Gambling Bill. He was Chairman of the Warsaw Ghetto Uprising Memorial Committee and in 1961 called attention to increasing votes for fascist candidates, declaring "anything that spells Fascism must be rooted out and destroyed".

When tension grew over the Berlin Wall in 1961, Cliffe was one of four Labour MPs who demanded the recall of Parliament, and later wrote a letter to President Kennedy and Nikita Khrushchev urging hasty negotiations and a moratorium on nuclear testing. He had been intending to continue his Parliamentary career, but was taken ill and died in St Bartholomew's Hospital in August 1964, aged 61. A 25-storey block of flats on the Finsbury Estate was named Michael Cliffe House in his memory by the Finsbury Metropolitan Borough Council.

Parliament of the United Kingdom
Preceded by Victor Collins	Member of Parliament for Shoreditch and Finsbury; 1958–1964	Succeeded by Ronald Brown
