= Russell Shaw Higgs =

Russell Shaw Higgs (born 12 May 1960) is a British artist and political activist.

== Biography ==
=== Childhood ===
Higgs was born in Oswestry 1960.

As a small child at Rokesly Infant School in North London, he wrote and narrated the early years school play. He later performed on stage for the first time in his infant school nativity play as the Angel Gabriel. From 1967-71 he attended Crouch End Primary School in North London, followed by 5 years at the Duke Of York's Royal Military School in Dover from 1971–76.

=== Adulthood ===
Higgs returned to live in London aged 16, in 1977. Attending Phildene Drama School in Turnham Green for one term. In 1982 Higgs formed the avant-garde dub rock band Wicked Kitchen Staff, releasing the album Debbie Grills Pulls Her Socks Up on Shout Records in 1983.

Higgs was a front line civil disobedience activist in ACT-UP London (1989–92), and he chaired the inaugural meetings of queer activist group Outrage (1990). In 1993 Higgs performed with the contemporary dance group 2Men at the Institute of Contemporary Arts, and with ManAct at London's Place Theatre. And in 1996 he had a brief role in the movie Boyfriends, playing the deceased boyfriend Mark.

On 15 July 2000, Higgs joined The Freedom To Be Yourself in a Naked Protest outside New Scotland Yard. Following a number of subsequent Public Nudity protests and arrests, he was remanded in a prison segregation cell for one month, whilst continuously unclothed, in Brixton Prison in December 2000, on non-imprisonable charges. After being released in January 2001, and winning a number of subsequent court trials, including appearing unclothed in Southwark Crown Court, Higgs featured in the Naked Protest documentary Being Human by Lisa Seidenberg.

In 2010 his short video "999 Days" was shortlisted for "Play" curated by the Guggenheim Museum and YouTube. In the spring of 2015, Higgs stood as an independent parliamentary candidate in the UK General Election for the constituency of Hackney South and Shoreditch. Higgs is an active supporter of an Unconditional Basic Income and photographs of his Basic Income street art posters can be found in numerous international online articles on the topic.
