= Workers' Birth Control Group =

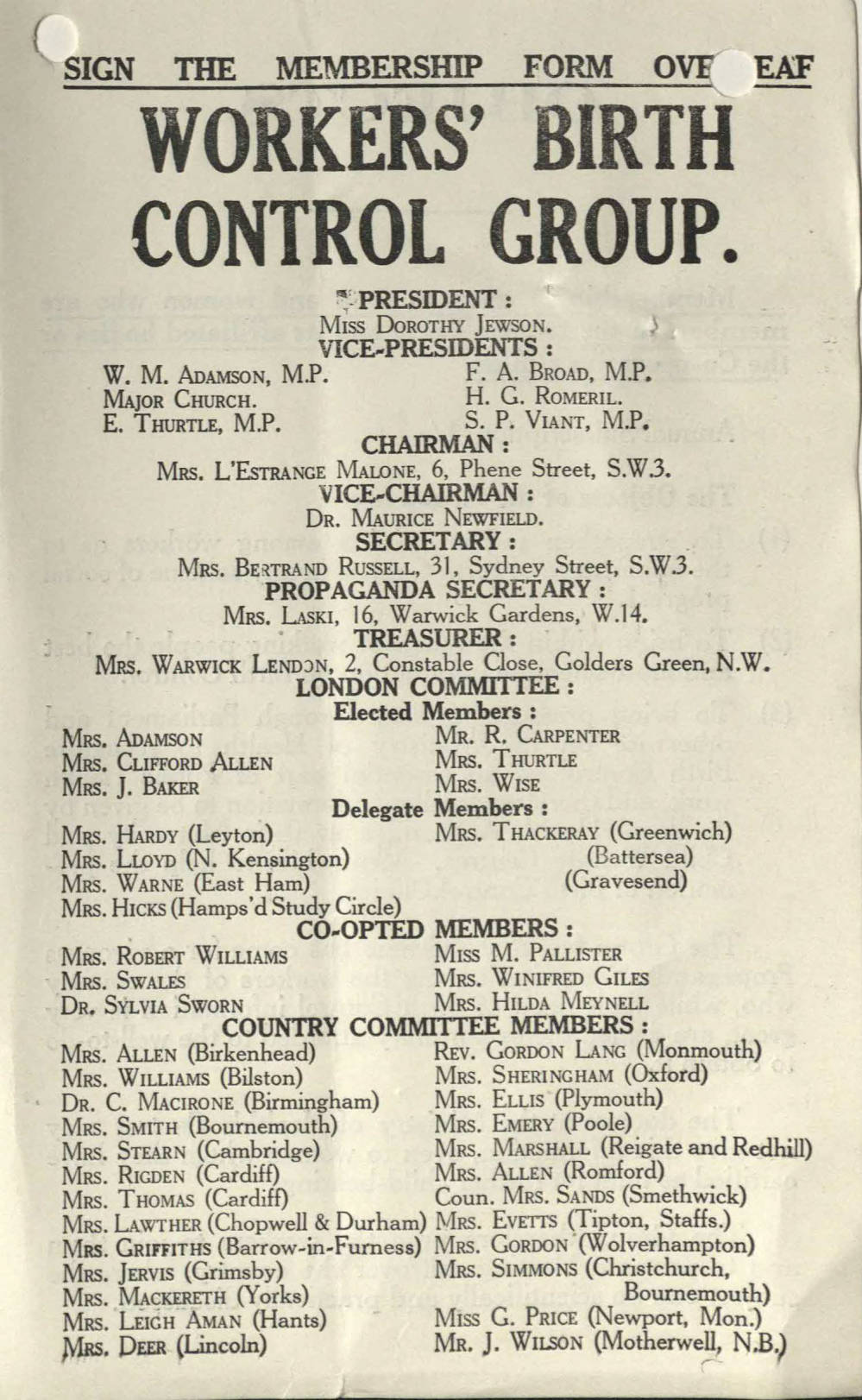
- Formation: 1924
- Founder: Dora Russell, Frida Laski, Leah L'Estrange Malone, Dorothy Thurtle, Ernest Thurtle
- Purpose: To bring pressure to bear through Parliament and otherwise on the Ministry of Health to recognise Birth Control as an essential part of Public Health work, and therefore to allow information to be given by the Local Health Authorities at their Maternity and Child Welfare Centres. Meanwhile to help the promotion of Birth Control Clinics.
- Location: United Kingdom
- President: Dorothy Jewson
- Chairman: Leah L'Estrange Malone
- Vice-chairman: Dr. Maurice Newfield
- Secretary: Dora Russell

Workers' Birth Control Group was a British organisation which sought to enable working class women to access birth control information and treatment, safely and free of charge. It was founded in 1924, in the wake of the women's conference of the Labour Party, by a group which included Dora Russell, Frida Laski, and Dorothy Jewson. The group deliberately distanced itself from other existing birth control organisations, which were typically middle class and inspired by ideas of eugenics.

== Origins ==
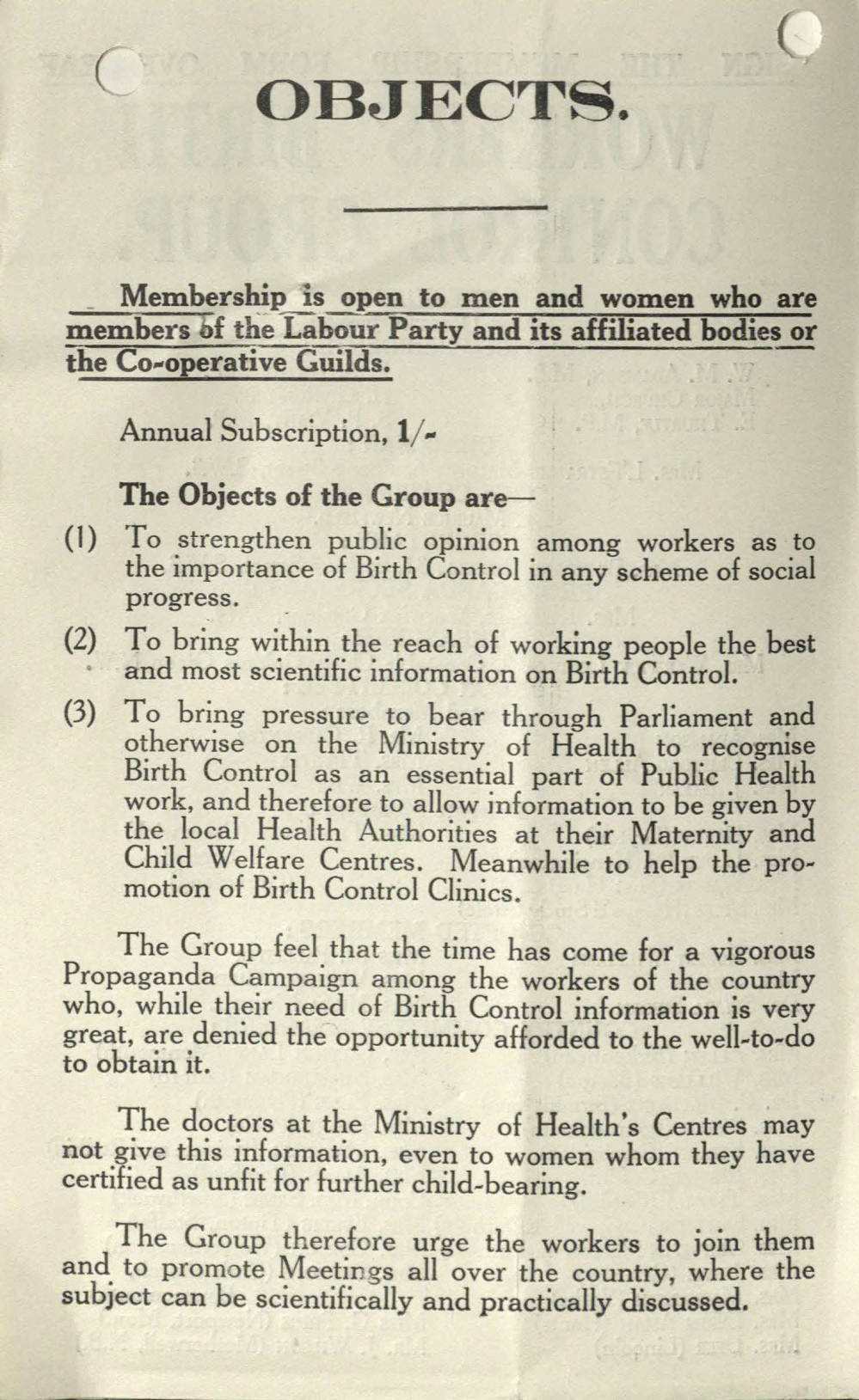
Objects of the Workers' Birth Control Group

During the 1920s, a number of prominent women's groups began to speak out in favour of access to, and information about, birth control. At the beginning of the decade, government restrictions were in place to prevent physicians at public health clinics from providing information on birth control, even to married women. In 1922, a Miss E. S. Daniels had been dismissed from her post in a public health department for refusal to comply with these regulations. In 1923, at the annual conference of the Women's Cooperative Guild, a resolution was passed in favour of calling for the alteration of these restrictions: making the WCG the first women's organisation to take up the issue of birth control. Although a similar resolution was proposed by the women's conference of the Labour Party in the same year, it came late in proceedings, and it was decided that there was too little time to discuss it effectively.

Dora Russell and Leah L'Estrange Malone, seeking to emphasise the health costs to mothers without access to birth control advice and drawing on statistics concerning maternal deaths, coined the slogan: 'It is four times as dangerous to bear a child as to work in a mine, and mining is men's most dangerous trade.' A deputation to the Minister of Health, John Wheatley, in 1924 included Dorothy Jewson, H.G. Wells, and Dr Frances Huxley, a gynaecologist and birth control supporter. Calling for birth control advice to be given to those who requested it, and for physicians to be allowed to give such advice when medically advisable, their requests were rejected by Wheatley, a Catholic.

At the 1924 Labour Party women's conference, a resolution on birth control was successfully passed, and shortly afterwards the Workers' Birth Control Group was formed. Key figures in the emergent organisation were prominent humanist activists Dora Russell, Frida Laski, and Ernest and Dorothy Thurtle, as well as Katharine Glasier, Susan Lawrence, Margaret Bondfield, and Dorothy Jewson. They used, as Jane Lewis has written, 'no justification other than the claim of all women as mothers to knowledge of matters concerning their health'. The Workers' Birth Control Group set themselves deliberately apart from Malthusian and eugenicist birth control groups, who they viewed as seeing the poor as inferior. H.G. Wells and Julian Huxley used their own public profiles to gain publicity for the campaign.

Many of the group's founders and members had already been active in the promotion of access to birth control prior to the group's formation, including Dora Russell - who, with John Maynard Keynes, had in 1923 paid the legal costs of Guy Aldred and Rose Witcop after they were found guilty of selling pamphlets on contraception. Witcop, along with Russell, Laski, Marjory Allen, Joan Malleson, and Leah L'Estrange Malone were signatories on the 1924 petition circulated by women members of the Labour Party and the Independent Labour Party outlining 'the large and growing demand among working mothers that information as to the methods of birth control be frankly, and decently given by public authority'. In addition to campaigning for increased access to contraception information from public health providers, members of the Workers' Birth Control Group lectured throughout the country on the subject of birth control.

== Campaigning ==
As Pamela M. Graves has written:

The WBCG had a single goal — to make it possible for working-class women to get birth control information and treatment, safely and without charge through the local state-supported maternity clinics. For six years from 1924 to 1930, the group kept in close touch with the women’s sections around the country, encouraging them to set up local birth control groups. They sent out speakers, distributed letters and pamphlets, organized public meetings and lobbied Labour members of Parliament.

Between 1924 and 1927, a number of regional Labour women's groups formed their own branches of the Workers' Birth Control Group. Despite repeated efforts, however, the Labour Party's executive council refused to adopt support for birth control as part of their platform, stating that: 'the subject of birth control is in its nature not one which should be made a political Party issue, but should remain a matter upon which members of the Party should be free to hold and promote their individual convictions.' As well as focus by male members of the Labour Party on other issues, the threat of losing the Catholic vote has been cited as a significant reason for the overall avoidance of adopting birth control promotion as part of official party policy. As well as a significant number of Catholics in major trade union groups, the Catholic John Wheatley was an influential figure in the party's leadership.

In 1926, Ernest Thurtle in the House of Commons and Lord Buckmaster in the House of Lords introduced bills in favour of birth control access. Thurtle's was defeated, but Buckmaster's passed. However, the Labour Party refused at their conference in four consecutive years to adopt a birth control resolution onto their platform. In 1928, speaking at the Women's Conference of the Labour Party, Arthur Henderson sought to explain this unwillingness to ‘legislate in advance of public opinion... on this question which touches the deep religious convictions of large numbers of people’, and to restore good feeling between the men and women of the party on the issue.

== Influence ==
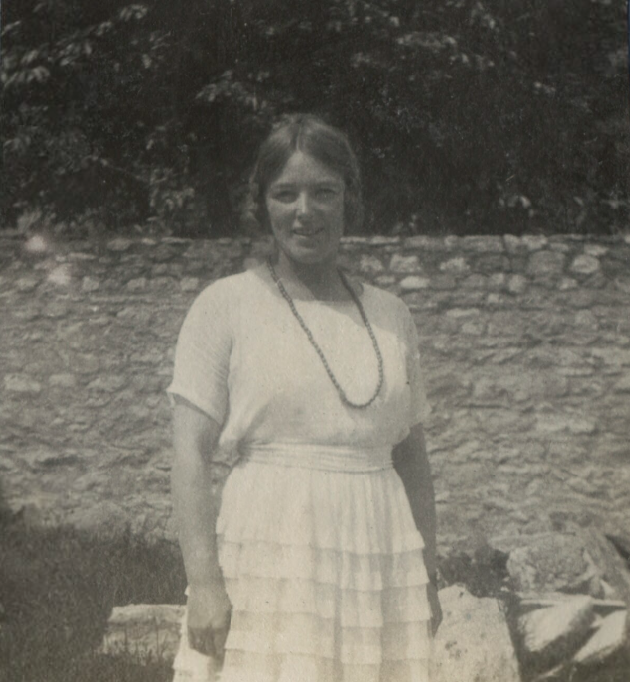
Dora Russell, 1922

Although the Workers' Birth Control Group were unsuccessful in convincing the Labour Party's executive to adopt an official stance on birth control, in 1930 Labour's Minister of Health circulated a memorandum to all local health authorities, stating that ‘in cases of medical necessity’ maternal and child welfare clinics could provide birth control information to women. This concession could at least in part be attributed to regional efforts by branches of the WBCG, who put pressure on local authorities. Many of these activists continued to campaign on a local level throughout the 1930s.

In her autobiography, The Tamarisk Tree, Dora Russell recalled the impact of the Workers' Birth Control Group on public opinion, and on the willingness to discuss a previously taboo issue:

The nationwide furore of comment and controversy, questions and debate in Parliament, debates in great numbers of local councils, innumerable meetings, are evidence of how large a contribution we all made to the enlightenment and liberation of women - and men too, on a subject hitherto shrouded in shame and secrecy. Marie Stopes' libel action at this date stirred immense public interest, but our work went down to the grass roots and made ordinary people begin to see that here was a pressing social and political problem. These women pioneers were a lively and intrepid group with whom I spent many rewarding hours. We were all sorts, intellectuals, middle and working class.

== Members and supporters ==
The Committee of the Workers' Birth Control Group included:

- Dora Russell
- Dorothy Jewson (President)
- W. M. Adamson
- Archibald Church
- Ernest Thurtle
- F.A. Broad
- H.G. Romeril
- S.P. Viant
- Frida Laski
- Joan Allen
- Dorothy Thurtle
- Leah L'Estrange Malone
- Alice Hicks
- Margaret Lloyd

Other active supporters were Jennie Adamson, Stella Browne and Janet Chance. The suffragette, Jessie Stephen, was also connected with the Workers' Birth Control Group.
