= Edward Wickham =

British politician (1890–1957)

Lieutenant-Colonel Edward Wickham MVO
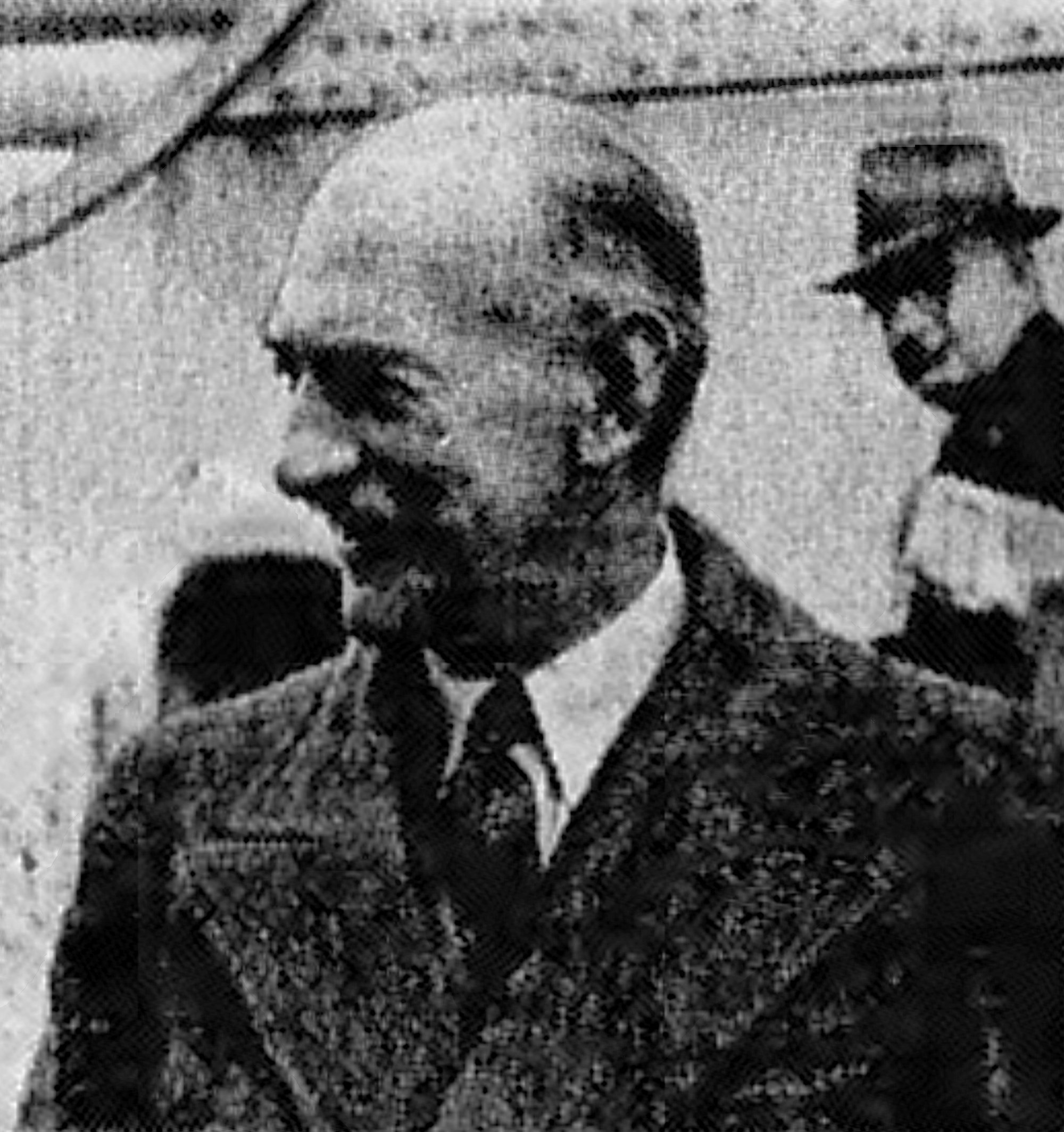
- Wickham in Australia, 1944

Member of Parliament for Taunton
- In office 1935–1945
- Preceded by: Hamilton Gault
- Succeeded by: Victor Collins

Personal details
- Born: 4 May 1890
- Died: 25 August 1957 (aged 67)
- Party: Conservative

Military service
- Allegiance: United Kingdom
- Branch/service: British Army
- Years of service: 1910–1935
- Rank: Lieutenant colonel
- Unit: Central India Horse
- Battles/wars: World War I

Lieutenant-Colonel Edward Thomas Ruscombe Wickham MVO (4 May 1890 – 25 August 1957) was a Conservative Party politician who served as the Member of Parliament (MP) for Taunton from 1935 until 1945. He had previously served in India from 1910 until 1935, first as an officer in the British Indian Army, and later a member of the Indian Political Department. From 1919 to 1921, he acted as officer in attendance for the European tour of the Shah of Persia, who awarded him the Order of the Lion and the Sun, 3rd Class. He fulfilled the same duties in 1928 for the King of Afghanistan. During his time as an MP, he served as a Parliamentary Private Secretary to two Secretaries of State for War, led a delegation to Australia and New Zealand in 1944, and visited a concentration camp soon after the Second World War.

== Life and career ==
=== Military career ===
Edward Thomas Ruscombe Wickham was born on 4 May 1890, to William James Richard Wickham, an officer in the British Indian Army, and his wife Mary Rose. He received his early education at The Oratory School in Birmingham. In 1910, he graduated from the Royal Military College, Sandhurst and was assigned to the Indian Army as a second lieutenant. Two years later, serving in the 39th King George's Own Central India Horse Regiment, he was promoted to lieutenant. During the First World War, he was made a temporary captain, and then later a full captain, from September 1915, although it was not until the following September that he received the pay and allowances of the rank.

After the First World War, he joined the Indian Political Department, and was temporarily granted the rank of lieutenant colonel "while specially employed" as the officer in attendance for the Shah of Persia during his tour of Europe between August and November 1919, and then again from December 1919 to May 1921. In 1920, he was awarded the Order of the Lion and the Sun, 3rd Class by the Shah of Persia. In March 1928, ranking a major, he was appointed a Member of the Royal Victorian Order (MVO). He served as the officer in attendance for the King of Afghanistan, Amānullāh Khān, in 1928. He then served in a variety of overseas roles: as an assistant financial adviser to the government of Persia, a counsellor at the British embassy in Kabul, Afghanistan, a secretary to the Baluchistan chief commissioner, and later became the Deputy Foreign Secretary to the Government of India, his final role in India. He retired from the Army in January 1935, at which point he was promoted to lieutenant colonel.

=== Member of Parliament ===
Hamilton Gault, the standing member of parliament (MP) for Taunton announced that he would not seek re-election in the 1935 general election, having served as the constituency's MP for the previous ten years. The Taunton branch of the Conservative Party invited Wickham, who was living in London at the time, to contest the election for them. Despite his residence, Wickham was described as coming from an "old Somerset family", and he confirmed that if he was elected, he would move to Taunton. The Labour Party was the only other party to contest the election, putting forward James Lunnon, who had previously acted as an organising secretary for the Agricultural Workers Union. The main topics during the election were agriculture and armament. The election was held on Thursday 14 November, and Wickham was returned with a majority of 8,224, holding the seat for the Conservative Party.

During his time in office, Wickham first addressed the House of Commons in March 1937, to speak about foreign policy. He spoke at length on the subject again the following year. He was appointed as a Parliamentary Private Secretary to Florence Horsbrugh in the Ministry of Health in July 1939, and in November 1939 switched to the same role under the Secretary of State for War, Leslie Hore-Belisha. When Hore-Belisha resigned from his post six weeks later, Wickham also left his position in the War Office. He was appointed to another Parliamentary Private Secretary role in June 1940, assisting Victor Warrender, the Financial Secretary to the Admiralty. Eight months later, he took on the role under the Secretary of State for War, this time David Margesson. In 1944 he led a parliamentary delegation to Australia and New Zealand, and the following year visited the Buchenwald concentration camp.

General elections had been suspended during the Second World War, and after Wickham's election in 1935, another one was not held until 1945. He again stood for the Conservative Party, with Victor Collins contesting the seat for Labour. During the election on 5 July, which was a landslide victory for the Labour Party, the Conservatives lost 182 seats, including that of Taunton. Wickham was defeated by a majority of 2,118 votes. His last address to the House of Commons had been in May 1945, on the subject of air services to Australia and India. The following year, he announced that he would not contest the Taunton seat at the next election.

=== Later life ===
Wickham later acted as the vice-chairman of the British Van Heusen Company, and the director of its subsidiary, J. & J. Ashton Ltd. He died in Liss, Hampshire, at the age of 67 on 25 August 1957.

Parliament of the United Kingdom
Preceded by Hamilton Gault	Member of Parliament for Taunton; 1935–1945	Succeeded by Victor Collins
