= Hogsthorpe =

Village in Lincolnshire, England

Coordinates: 53.224188°N 0.301317°E

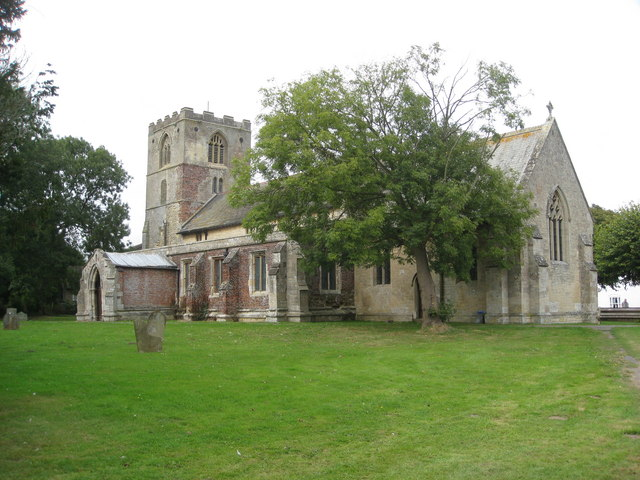
- Saint Mary's Church, Hogsthorpe

- Location within Lincolnshire
- Population: 908 (2011)
- OS grid reference: TF537721
  - London: 120 mi (190 km) SSE
- District: East Lindsey
- Shire county: Lincolnshire
- Region: East Midlands
- Country: England
- Sovereign state: United Kingdom
- Post town: Skegness
- Postcode district: PE24
- Police: Lincolnshire
- Fire: Lincolnshire
- Ambulance: East Midlands
- UK Parliament: Boston and Skegness

Hogsthorpe is a small village in the East Lindsey district of Lincolnshire, England. It is situated approximately 2 miles (3 km) from the North Sea and Chapel St Leonards, and about 7 miles (11 km) north from Skegness. The A52 road runs through Hogsthorpe, connecting the village to the nearby resorts of Skegness, Mablethorpe and Ingoldmells.

The parish includes the hamlets of Slackholme and Authorpe Row.

Hogsthorpe contains a church, a restaurant, two public houses, a small primary school and a village hall.

== History ==
Hogsthorpe's church, dedicated to Saint Mary, is built in Early English style of limestone and greenstone, and is a Grade I Listed Building. It dates from the 12th century, and has a 12th-century tower, a 15th-century font and a pulpit from 1730. The chancel was rebuilt in 1870, and the church was restored in 1853 and 1910.

Hogsthorpe Village

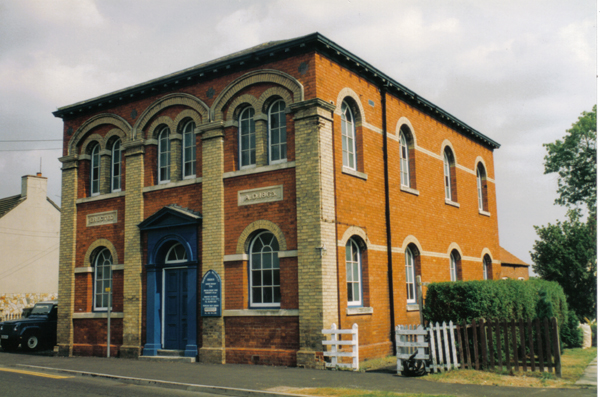
Wesleyan Chapel

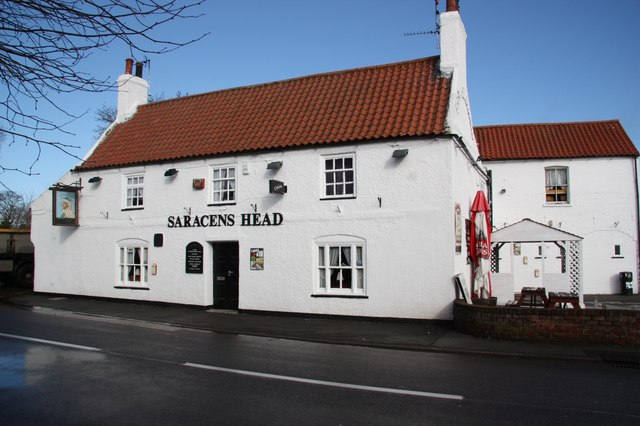
Saracen's Head

In 1885 Kelly's reported a Wesleyan and a Primitive Methodist chapel, corn mills and brickfields. Chief landowners included Baroness Willoughby de Eresby and Lord of the manor Lieutenant Colonel Sir Nelson Rycroft bart of Kempshott Park. The parish had an area of 2,870 acres (11.6 km^{2}) supporting the production of wheat, beans and oats, and an 1881 population of 719.

The Wesleyan chapel was built in 1863, but closed in 1994 and was converted into flats in 1997.

The Saracens Head is a Grade II listed early 18th-century public house.

Built as a National School in 1857, Hogsthorpe school was the Hogsthorpe County Primary School between 1947 and 1999, and is now the Hogsthorpe Community Primary School.

The village was the birthplace of politician Christopher Addison, 1st Viscount Addison.

== Population ==
Population of Hogsthorpe Civil Parish
Year	1801	1811	1821	1831	1841	1851	1881	1891	1901	1911	1921	1931	1951	1961	2001	2011
Population	451	515	591	698	790	832	719	684	610	590	511	531	599	494	873	908
