= St Peter's Church of England Aided School =

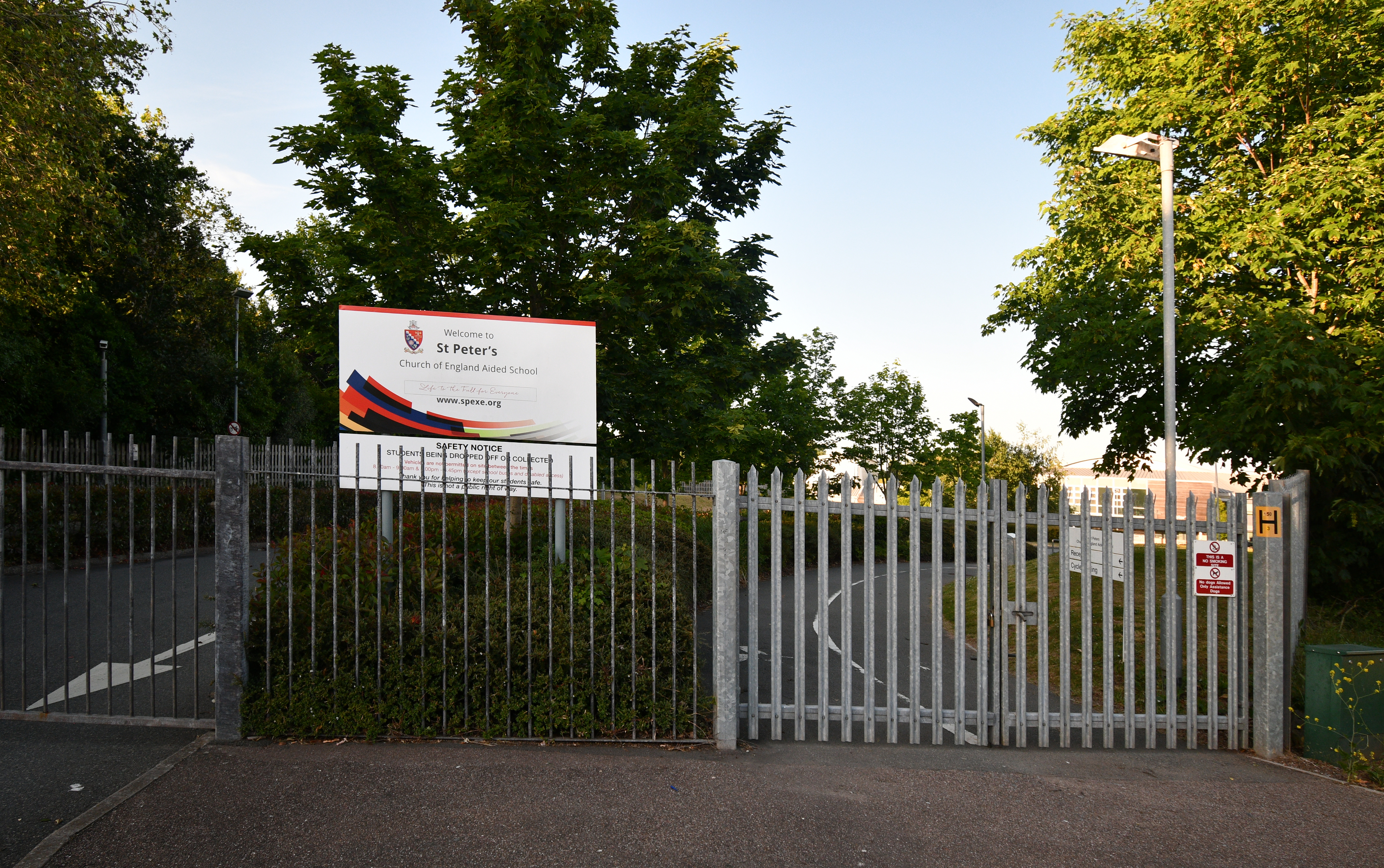
- Signpost of St. Peter's Church of England Aided School

Location
- Quarry Lane; Heavitree; Exeter, Devon, EX2 5AP; England
- Coordinates: 50.71866°N 3.4833°W

Information
- Type: Voluntary aided school
- Religious affiliation: Church of England
- Local authority: Devon
- Department for Education URN: 113553 Tables
- Ofsted: Reports
- Head teacher: Phil Randall
- Gender: Coeducational
- Age: 11 to 16
- Enrolment: 2000+
- Colours: Navy Blue and Red
- Vision statement: "Life to the full for everyone."

St Peter's Church of England Aided School is one of Exeter's five state sector high schools.

The school was awarded language college status in 2002. The current headteacher of the school is Phil Randall.

The old school building was knocked down (September 2006). Since then, a new building managed by Carillion has been in use. Carillion was then taken over by Sodexo in 2015 for a 5-year contract. Since the Sodexo contract ended in 2020, Fusion School Services has managed the building

The school was formed by the amalgamation of Hele's School and Bishop Blackall School in 1983.

== Notable former pupils ==
- Ben Aldridge (born 1985) - actor
- Matt Grimes (born 1995) - footballer
- Joe Talbot (born 1984) - lead singer of Idles [since 2009]
