= 1954 Shoreditch and Finsbury by-election =

UK Parliamentary by-election

The 1954 Shoreditch and Finsbury by-election was held on 21 October 1954 after the death of the incumbent Labour MP, Ernest Thurtle. It was retained by the Labour candidate, Victor Collins.

Shoreditch and Finsbury by-election, 1954
Party	Candidate	Votes	%	±%
Labour	Victor Collins	18,082	78.19	+5.6
Conservative	Malcolm Bowden Agnew	5,043	21.81	−5.6
Majority		13,039	56.38	+11.3
Turnout		23,125		
Labour hold		Swing		
