= Christopher Addison, 2nd Viscount Addison =

The Right Honourable The Viscount Addison
- Viscount Addison in 1953.

Member of the House of Lords Lord Temporal
- In office 12 December 1951 – 18 November 1976 as a hereditary peer
- Preceded by: The 1st Viscount Addison
- Succeeded by: The 3rd Viscount Addison

Personal details
- Born: 8 December 1904
- Died: 18 November 1976 (aged 71)
- Spouse: Brigit Helen Christine Williams

Christopher Addison, 2nd Viscount Addison (8 December 1904 – 18 November 1976), was a British peer. The son of Christopher Addison, 1st Viscount Addison, he succeeded the viscountcy on the death of his father in 1951.

Lord Addison married Brigit Helen Christine Williams (d. 1980), on 10 September 1928, with whom he had the following children:

- Hon. Jacqueline Faith Addison (b. 2 March 1944)
- Hon. Christine Gray Addison (b. 3 September 1946)

As he left no male heir, he was succeeded by his brother Michael.

== Arms ==
Coat of arms of Christopher Addison, 2nd Viscount Addison

Crest
In front of two keys in saltire wards upwards a sword point downwards Or.
Escutcheon
Per chevron Vert and Or in chief a snake embowed head debruised between two garbs of the last and in base an anchor Sable.
Supporters
On either side a Lincolnshire red bull Proper the headstall also Proper charged with a sun in splendour Or.
Motto
Servire Est Vivere (To Serve Is To Live)

Peerage of the United Kingdom
Preceded by Christopher Addison	Viscount Addison; 1951–1976; Member of the House of Lords (1951–1976)	Succeeded by Michael Addison
