= 1958 Shoreditch and Finsbury by-election =

UK parliamentary by-election

The 1958 Shoreditch and Finsbury by-election was a UK parliamentary by-election for the Shoreditch and Finsbury constituency held on 27 November 1958.

The by-election was held following the conferment of a life peerage for Victor Collins.

It was a Labour hold. Until the 1999 Leeds Central by-election, the turnout was the lowest in post-war history.

== Result ==
Shoreditch and Finsbury by-election, 1958
Party	Candidate	Votes	%	±%
Labour	Michael Cliffe	10,215	76.04	+2.59
Conservative	Thomas Henry Martin Whipham	3,219	23.96	−2.59
Majority		6,996	52.08	+5.18
Turnout		13,434		
Labour hold		Swing		

== Previous result ==
General election 1955: Shoreditch and Finsbury
Party	Candidate	Votes	%	±%
Labour	Victor Collins	25,500	73.45	+0.8
Conservative	M Agnew	9,216	26.55	−0.9
Majority		16,284	46.90	+1.7
Turnout		34,716	77.4	+4.2
Labour hold		Swing		
