= William Addison, 4th Viscount Addison =

British peer

The Right Honourable The Viscount Addison

Member of the House of Lords Lord Temporal
- In office 23 March 1992 – 11 November 1999 as a hereditary peer
- Preceded by: The 3rd Viscount Addison
- Succeeded by: Seat abolished

Personal details
- Born: 12 June 1945 (age 81)
- Party: Conservative
- Spouse(s): Joanna Mary Dickinson; Lesley Ann Mawer
- Education: Westminster School; King's School, Bruton

William Matthew Wand Addison, 4th Viscount Addison (born 13 June 1945) is a British peer. The son of Michael Addison, 3rd Viscount Addison, he succeeded the Viscountcy on the death of his father in 1992.

He was educated at Westminster School and King's School, Bruton.

In the House of Lords, Viscount Addison had sat as a Conservative peer until the House of Lords Act 1999 removed his automatic right to sit in the House. He stood for election as an elected hereditary peer (and therefore possessing the right to continue to sit). However, he finished 47th amongst the Conservative peers (a total of 42 Conservative peers were elected). He stood in subsequent by-elections for election to the House, but was unsuccessful.

On 10 October 1970, he married Joanna Mary Dickinson, with whom he had the following children:

- Hon. Sarah Louise Addison (b. 1971)
- Hon. Paul Wand Addison (b. 1973)
- Hon. Caroline Amy Addison (b. 1979)

In 1991, he married Lesley Ann Mawer.

== Arms ==
Coat of arms of William Addison, 4th Viscount Addison

Crest
In front of two keys in saltire wards upwards a sword point downwards Or.
Escutcheon
Per chevron Vert and Or in chief a snake embowed head debruised between two garbs of the last and in base an anchor Sable.
Supporters
On either side a Lincolnshire red bull Proper the headstall also Proper charged with a sun in splendour Or.
Motto
Servire Est Vivere (To Serve Is To Live)

Peerage of the United Kingdom
| Preceded by Michael Addison | Viscount Addison; 1992–present Member of the House of Lords (1992–1999) | Incumbent; Heir apparent: Hon. Paul Addison |
