= Ernest Griffith Price =

British politician

Ernest Griffith Price (13 May 1870 – 5 January 1962) was a British National Liberal, later Liberal politician and wharfinger.

== Family and education ==
Price was the son of John T Griffith Price of Ilford in Essex. He was educated at Ilford College. In 1900 he married Maude Ethel Marshall, the daughter of an army Major and justice of the peace from Johannesburg, South Africa.

== Business career ==
Price went into business as a contractor. He became a director of various companies, most importantly of Bridge Wharves Co. Ltd and Shepwood Partition Brick Co. Ltd. He was also a director of B.Goodman & Co., demolition contractors. Price was sometime President of his Trade Association and Past Master of the Worshipful Company of Paviors in the City of London.

== Politics ==
One source indicates that Price was a Conservative in politics but at the 1922 general election he was elected member of parliament for Shoreditch as a National Liberal, that is a supporter of the former prime minister David Lloyd George. At the election his Liberal opponent was Dr Christopher Addison once a strong supporter of Lloyd George himself. Addison polled over 6,000 votes but finished bottom of the poll. However, Price could not aggregate the former Liberal and National Liberal at the 1923 and he lost the seat to Labour even though he had no Conservative opponent.

Price was also a member of the Board of Management of the Reedham Orphanage in Purley.

== Death ==
He died aged 91 on 5 January 1962.

Parliament of the United Kingdom
Preceded by Christopher Addison	Member of Parliament for Shoreditch; 1922 – 1923	Succeeded by Ernest Thurtle
