= Michael Addison, 3rd Viscount Addison =

British civil servant

The Right Honourable The Viscount Addison

Member of the House of Lords Lord Temporal
- In office 19 November 1976 – 23 March 1992 as a hereditary peer
- Preceded by: The 2nd Viscount Addison
- Succeeded by: The 4th Viscount Addison

Personal details
- Born: 12 April 1914
- Died: 23 March 1992 (aged 77)
- Spouse: Kathleen Wand
- Education: Hele's School, Exeter; Balliol College, Oxford

Michael Addison, 3rd Viscount Addison (12 April 1914 – 23 March 1992), was a British civil servant and academic.

Addison was the second son of Christopher Addison, 1st Viscount Addison, and his first wife, Isobel Mackinnon Gray. His father, a physician and politician, was created a viscount in 1945. He was educated at Hele's School, Exeter, and Balliol College, Oxford.

He was in the Civil Service between 1936 and 1965. He served as an intelligence officer in the Second World War between 1941 and 1945 as a Flying Officer with the Royal Air Force Volunteer Reserve. He was a senior lecturer between 1965 and 1976 in the Polytechnic of Central London, School of Management Studies, London. He succeeded in the viscountcy on the death of his brother, who died with no male heir in 1976.

Lord Addison married Kathleen Wand, daughter of the Right Reverend Sir William Wand, on 22 August 1936, with whom he had the following children:

- Hon. Eleanor Brigit Addison (b. 11 June 1938)
- Hon. Caroline Ruth Addison (b. 30 July 1942)
- William Matthew Wand Addison, 4th Viscount Addison (b. 13 June 1945)

He died in 1992 and was succeeded by his only son.

== Arms ==
Coat of arms of Michael Addison, 3rd Viscount Addison

Crest
In front of two keys in saltire wards upwards a sword point downwards Or.
Escutcheon
Per chevron Vert and Or in chief a snake embowed head debruised between two garbs of the last and in base an anchor Sable.
Supporters
On either side a Lincolnshire red bull Proper the headstall also Proper charged with a sun in splendour Or.
Motto
Servire Est Vivere (To Serve Is To Live)

Peerage of the United Kingdom
Preceded by Christopher Addison	Viscount Addison; 1976–1992; Member of the House of Lords (1976–1992)	Succeeded by William Addison
