= Boyfriends (film) =

- Directed by: Tom Hunsinger; Neil Hunter
- Written by: Tom Hunsinger; Neil Hunter
- Produced by: Tom Hunsinger; Neil Hunter
- Starring: James Dreyfus
- Cinematography: Richard Tisdall
- Edited by: John Trumper
- Distributed by: First Run Features
- Release date: 1996
- Running time: 81 minutes
- Country: United Kingdom
- Language: English

Boyfriends is a 1996 British independent film. Three gay couples, all of whom are suffering relationship problems, spend a weekend at the seaside and learn how to deal with their issues from each other. The film was written and directed by Tom Hunsinger and Neil Hunter. The film was James Dreyfus' last role as an unknown before taking the part of Constable Goody in The Thin Blue Line. The film also starred Mark Sands, Michael Urwin, Andrew Ableson, David Coffey, Darren Petrucci and Michael McGrath.

== Plot ==
Paul, Matt and Will, three best friends decide to go on holiday together. Paul (James Dreyfus) brings his lover Ben, but their five-year relationship is unstable owing to Paul's continued moodiness over the death of his brother Mark; Matt brings Owen, with whom he wants a lifelong relationship but whose boisterous personality doesn't suit him; and Will brings Adam, a 20-year-old one-night stand. Mark's lover also comes along for some sense of closure.

== Cast ==
Only the seven main characters and Mark appear throughout the entire film.

- James Dreyfus as Paul
- Mark Sands as Ben
- Michael Urwin as Matt
- Andrew Ableson as Owen
- David Coffey as Will
- Darren Petrucci as Adam
- Michael McGrath as James
- Russell Higgs as Mark

== Soundtrack ==
The film's closing music is Dinah Washington's I Wish I Knew the Name (Of the Boy in My Dreams).

== Critical reception ==
Boyfriends won the 1996 Best Featured Film Award at the Torino International Gay & Lesbian Film Festival. General critical reviews were mixed, with one describing the film as "a biting, shrewd and scathingly funny dissection of gay relationships". Another critic, however, wrote "Boyfriends suffers from too many soap-opera-like subplots that seem set up to create tension".
