= Charles Summersby =

British draper and politician

Charles Harold Summersby (1882 – 13 August 1961) was a British draper and Liberal National politician.

== Family and education ==
Summersby was the son of the Reverend B J Summersby, a Congregational minister from Oxfordshire. He was educated locally until the age of fourteen when he left school and moved to London to serve a four-year apprenticeship in the drapery business. He and his wife had two sons and a daughter.

== Career ==
After his apprenticeship Summersby became a buyer for the Derry & Toms department store in Kensington and in 1912 started his own business. By 1931 he was the owner of large shop in Muswell Hill.

== Politics ==
=== Local politics ===
Summersby was elected to Hornsey Borough Council in 1921 and was Mayor of Hornsey from 1930 to 1931 He was also later a member of Middlesex County Council for Harringay. He won a by-election there on 28 January 1936 standing as a Municipal Reform Party candidate by 485 votes to the 327 gained by his Labour opponent Samuel Campbell. There was only a small turnout because the date coincided with the funeral of King George V who had died on 20 January. Summersby also served as justice of the peace.

=== Parliament ===
Summersby was selected to fight Shoreditch at the 1931 general election as a Liberal National and defeated the sitting Labour MP, Ernest Thurtle. While in the House of Commons Summersby served as a member of the Parliamentary Air Committee. He did not seek re-election at the 1935 general election and was replaced as National Liberal candidate by Mr Somerset Stopford Brooke, a stock broker, and former Liberal candidate for Guildford in 1929, who was the son of the Liberal MP for Bow and Bromley from 1906 to 1910. Summersby must have known that without the effect of the crisis of 1931 which had helped propel him into Parliament, his seat would be highly vulnerable to Labour and Stopford Brooke, could not hold the seat against Ernest Thurtle's renewed challenge.

Parliament of the United Kingdom
Preceded by Ernest Thurtle	Member of Parliament for Shoreditch; 1931 – 1935	Succeeded by Ernest Thurtle
