= Ernest Thurtle =

British politician (1884–1954)

Ernest Thurtle MP
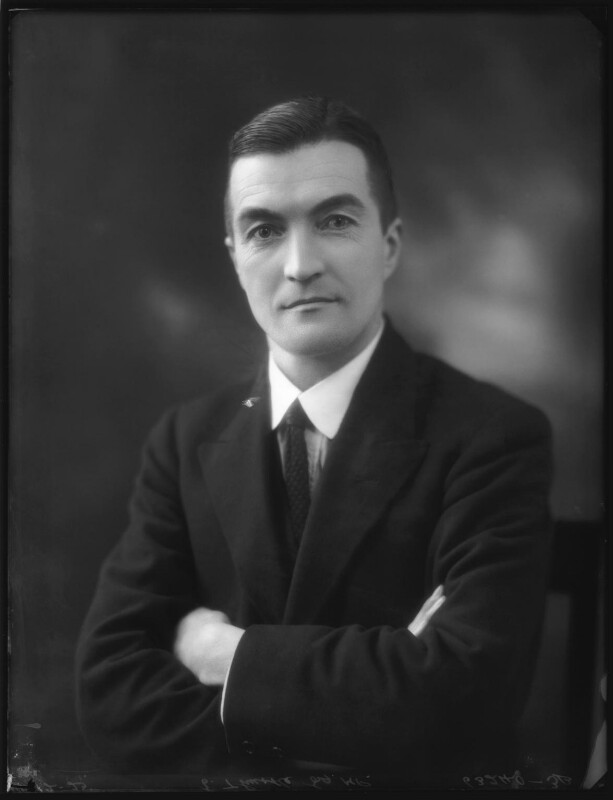

Member of Parliament for Shoreditch and Finsbury
- In office 23 February 1950 – 22 August 1954
- Preceded by: Constituency created
- Succeeded by: Victor Collins

Member of Parliament for Shoreditch
- In office 14 November 1935 – 23 February 1950
- Preceded by: Charles Harold Summersby
- Succeeded by: Constituency abolished
- In office 6 December 1923 – 27 October 1931
- Preceded by: Ernest Griffith Price
- Succeeded by: Charles Harold Summersby

Personal details
- Born: 11 November 1884 Port Jervis, New York, U.S.
- Died: 22 August 1954 (aged 69) Epsom, Surrey, England
- Party: Labour
- Spouse: Dorothy Lansbury (m. 1912)
- Children: 2

Ernest Thurtle (11 November 1884 – 22 August 1954) was a British Labour politician and social reformer.

== Early years ==
Ernest Thurtle was born at Port Jervis, New York state, USA, on 11 November 1884, the second son of British parents, Philip Thurtle (d. 1890), a trainer of sporting dogs, and his wife, Emma, née Robinson (d. 1912). When Ernest was two, the family moved to Alfrick, Worcestershire. When his father died, his mother moved to Griffithstown, near Pontypool, Monmouthshire, supporting the family by running a general store and taking in sewing.

After elementary schooling at Alfrick and in Pontypool, Ernest found work in the weighing machine office of the steelworks of Alfred Baldwin Ltd., near Pontypool. Thurtle was ‘a Conservative by heredity’ and a member of the Church of England until his teenage years, but he then became involved in Labour politics, joining the Independent Labour Party (ILP) in about 1907.

After moving to London, Thurtle became chairman of the London district council of the National Union of Clerks, and was employed as a salesman for an asphalt company. Through the NUC, he met Dorothy Lansbury, the daughter of Labour MP George Lansbury, and they married in 1912. In 1913, Ernest and Dorothy jointly authored a pamphlet, Comradeship for Clerks: An Appeal for Organisation. Dorothy Thurtle became a borough councillor and then the Mayor of Shoreditch Borough Council, and a leading campaigner for women's reproductive rights.

During World War I Thurtle enlisted in the London Regiment, served on the western front, was commissioned in 1917, and was seriously wounded at the Battle of Cambrai. When he returned to civilian life, Thurtle joined the National Federation of Discharged Sailors and Soldiers (NFDDSS). He stood as a parliamentary candidate for South West Bethnal Green at the general election of 1918, when he was ‘one of the few left-wing Federation candidates'.

Thurtle worked for the United Services Fund, which provided aid to ex-servicemen. In 1921 he resigned from the National Executive Committee of the NFDDSS because he disagreed with 'the forthcoming amalgamation with reactionary organisations like the Comrades of the Great War and the Officers' Association'.

In the 1922 general election, Thurtle was the Labour candidate for Shoreditch but was defeated by a narrow margin of only 250 votes. He was then elected the MP for Shoreditch from 1923. He lost his seat in the National Government's landslide of 1931, and worked as a brewers' representative. He then represented Shoreditch from 1935 to 1950, and Shoreditch and Finsbury from 1950 until his death.

He served as parliamentary private secretary to the minister of pensions in the first Labour government of1924. He took the same role supporting his father-in-law George Lansbury as commissioner of works in 1929-30. He then held the unpaid posts of Junior Lord of the Treasury and government whip simultaneously in 1930-31.

== Campaigns and achievements ==
In the early 1920s, Thurtle was strongly anti-militarist, criticising the armistice day remembrance ceremonials and opposing armed forces recruitment. In March 1924, Thurtle seconded an amendment to the Army Estimates to maintain land forces of 161,600, to reduce the number by 150,000. This was ‘meant as a deliberate challenge to the general acceptance of the use of force’. The amendment was defeated by 347-13. THurtle was a supporter of the League Against Imperialism, and he visited India in 1928 and met Gandhi.

Thurtle's greatest achievement in Parliament was to bring about the abolition of the death penalty for cowardice or desertion in the British Army. With over 300 British soldiers shot by firing squad after brief trials during World War I, Thurtle published two pamphlets on the issue, Military discipline and democracy in 1920, and Shootings at dawn: The Army death penalty at work in 1924. Thurtle first introduced the measure for abolition in 1924. It became Labour Party policy in 1925 and was eventually approved by the House of Commons in 1930, during the Second Labour government (1929–31). Supporters of the measure included T. E. Lawrence, also known as Lawrence of Arabia, but the abolition was first rejected by the House of Lords, which was encouraged in their resistance by various retired generals, including Lord Allenby. The House of Commons insisted, and the measure was enacted.

The argument that it would reduce the determination of the soldiers was countered by the fact that Australia had always made it clear when it joined the war effort that none of its men would be executed for these crimes. No Australians were shot for cowardice or desertion, but it was clear that their troops had been as effective as any others in the war. Thurtle continued to be involved in ex-servicemen's associations.

At the Labour Party conference in 1923, Thurtle supported two republican motions. The first stated "that the Royal Family is no longer a necessary party of the British constitution" and the second was "that the hereditary principle in the British Constitution be abolished".

Thurtle was a Rationalist and strongly opposed organised religion. In this he differed from his father-in-law George Lansbury who was very much a Christian socialist. Thurtle was General Secretary of the Rationalist Press Association 1932-40 and, in 1941, its Chairman.

Ernest and Dorothy were leading members of the Workers' Birth Control Group, established in 1924, which sought to persuade the Labour Party to commit itself formally to the extension of working women's access to birth control information. Thurtle ‘relentlessly questioned successive Ministers of Health on the subject of birth control for more than a decade’, and on 9 February 1926 he moved a Ten Minute Rule bill to authorise local authorities to convey knowledge of birth control methods to married women who so desired. His bill was merely permissive. It enabled local authorities to act, but did not compel them to do so.

Thurtle was an early advocate of the proposal for a Channel Tunnel, raising the idea in 1930 and again in 1947.

== Later years ==
Thurtle took increasingly conservative and right-wing positions in later years.

In December 1929, he resigned from the left-wing ILP because its MPs believed they were ‘entitled to defy a majority decision of the Parliamentary Labour Party'.

Thurtle defended Neville Chamberlain’s policy at Munich. In 1939 he told the House of Commons, ‘At the time of the crisis last September… I thought there was every justification, in all the circumstances, for his [Chamberlain] doing what he did at Munich’; and in relation the situation in March 1939, ‘I think, in view of his world reputation as a man for peace, he is probably the best man for the job’. In his 1945 memoir Time's winged chariot: memories and comments, Thurtle added that Chamberlain’s actions at Munich had been motivated by‘high moral purpose’.

In November 1939, Thurtle called for the dismissal of civil servants in fighting services departments who were conscientious objectors; with the ILP’s John McGovern replying that Thurtle ‘seems to be developing a Hitler mentality’. Thurtle’s evident ambition for a government post led Aneurin Bevan to describe him in the House of Commons in 1940 as a ‘pimp of the Government’.

Thurtle served under Brendan Bracken as parliamentary secretary of the Ministry of Information from 1941 until 1945. Reviewing Thurtle’s 1945 memoir, the Sunday Mirror wrote that ‘the author is known in the Labour Party as one of the “good boys who was a supporter of Mr. Chamberlain and who worked his way into becoming Parliamentary secretary of the Ministry of Information at £1,500 a year”’.

Thurtle's memoir included extravagant praise of Chamberlain and Churchill, whereas ‘British Communists and the more Left-wing sections of the Labour Party are the main targets for Thurtle’s criticism'.

At a time when mainstream politicians were cautiously considering exposing the BBC to commercial competition, in his memoir Thurtle advocated turning broadcasting over to competitive commercial enterprises alone.

Thurtle was not appointed to any further ministerial or party positions after the war, and he remained a backbench MP. He died at the Horton Hospital, Epsom, Surrey, on 22 August 1954, at the age of 69.

Parliament of the United Kingdom
Preceded by Ernest Griffith Price	Member of Parliament for Shoreditch; 1923–1931	Succeeded by Charles Harold Summersby
Preceded by Charles Harold Summersby	Member of Parliament for Shoreditch; 1935–1950	Constituency abolished
New constituency	Member of Parliament for Shoreditch and Finsbury; 1950–1954	Succeeded by Victor Collins
