= Victor Collins, Baron Stonham =

Anglo-Irish peer and British politician and academic

The Right Honourable The Lord Stonham OBE PC
- The Lord Stonham

Minister of State for Home Affairs
- In office 29 August 1967 – 13 October 1969
- Monarch: Elizabeth II
- Prime Minister: Harold Wilson
- Preceded by: Alice Bacon
- Succeeded by: Shirley Williams

Parliamentary Under-Secretary of State for Home Affairs
- In office 20 October 1964 – 29 August 1967
- Monarch: Elizabeth II
- Prime Minister: Harold Wilson
- Preceded by: Mervyn Pike
- Succeeded by: Elystan Morgan

Member of the House of Lords Lord Temporal
- In office 5 August 1958 – 22 December 1971; Life Peerage

Member of Parliament for Shoreditch and Finsbury
- In office 21 October 1954 – 2 August 1958
- Preceded by: Ernest Thurtle
- Succeeded by: Michael Cliffe

Member of Parliament for Taunton
- In office 5 July 1945 – 23 February 1950
- Preceded by: Edward Wickham
- Succeeded by: Henry Hopkinson

Personal details
- Born: 1 July 1903 Whitechapel, London, England
- Died: 22 December 1971 (aged 68)
- Party: Labour

Victor John Collins, Baron Stonham OBE PC (1 July 1903 – 22 December 1971) was a British Labour Party politician.

Born in Whitechapel, London, he was the son of Victor and Eliza Sarah (Williams) Collins. Despite living in the East End he managed to get to Regent Street Polytechnic (now Westminster University), and University of London. After graduating he joined the family firm J.Collins & Sons, a furniture and basket-making firm, started by his grandfather, John Collins. He was still aged 20. The firm acquired a 70-acre farm at Earl Stonham, where he grew willows for the industry. He held the chairs on a number of industry-based organizations, including president of the National Basket and Willow Trades Advisory Committee.

On 30 April 1929, he married Violet Mary, daughter of T E Savage of Crouch End.

During wartime, the Ministry of Supply recruited his assistance to buy and sell and distribute willows. At the height of the conflict Collins decided to join the Labour Party; part of which was actually in opposition to Churchill's National Coalition. Collins chose to contest a westcountry seat, and much to his surprise elected at the 1945 general election as Member of Parliament for Taunton, in Somerset. He lost the seat at the 1950, to the Conservative Henry Hopkinson. Collins has been the only Labour Member of Parliament for the Taunton constituency. He was appointed an OBE in 1946 for services to wartime industries.

Collins returned to the House of Commons at a by-election in 1954, when he was elected as MP for the inner London constituency of Shoreditch and Finsbury, following the death of the Labour MP Ernest Thurtle.

He left the Commons and was created a life peer as Baron Stonham, of Earl Stonham in the County of Suffolk on 5 August 1958. His maiden speech on 19 November, was on racial prejudice and street violence. Stonham wished to include the trade unions in managing both immigration and the handling of black people.

During Harold Wilson's first spell as Prime Minister, Lord Stonham served as a junior minister at the Home Office from 1964 to 1967, and was then promoted to Minister of State at the Home Office until 1969. As Minister of State with responsibility for Northern Ireland, he made a three-day visit to the province starting on 4 June 1968. He contributed to a number of reforms of penal servitude policy, by including a more complex parole system contained in the Criminal Justice Act 1967. Stonham believed that streamlined industries could provide a modern solution to prisoner rehabilitation, where unskilled and semi-skilled workers could be granted a better opportunity to stay out of prison.

Stonham was appointed as a Privy Counsellor in 1969. He died in Enfield aged 68.

Parliament of the United Kingdom
Preceded by Edward Wickham	Member of Parliament for Taunton; 1945–1950	Succeeded by Henry Hopkinson
Preceded by Ernest Thurtle	Member of Parliament for Shoreditch and Finsbury; 1954–1958	Succeeded by Michael Cliffe
