= Hackney South and Shoreditch =

UK Parliament constituency (since 1974)

Coordinates: 51.54°N 0.06°W

- Borough constituency for the House of Commons
- Interactive map of boundaries from 2024
- Boundary of Hackney South and Shoreditch in Greater London
- County: Greater London
- Electorate: 75,197 (March 2020)

Current constituency
- Created: 1974
- Member of Parliament: Meg Hillier (Labour Co-op)
- Seats: One
- Created from: Shoreditch and Finsbury

Hackney South and Shoreditch is a constituency (Note: A borough constituency (for the purposes of election expenses and type of returning officer)) represented in the House of Commons of the UK Parliament since 2005 by Meg Hillier of Labour Co-op. (Note: As with all constituencies, the constituency elects one Member of Parliament (MP) by the first past the post system of election at least every five years.)

== Constituency profile ==
Hackney South and Shoreditch is an urban constituency located in the Borough of Hackney close to the centre of London. It contains the neighbourhoods of Hackney, Shoreditch, Hoxton and Dalston. In the 1980s, Hackney was described as "Britain's Poorest Borough", including by the council itself in official materials. Since then, the area has experienced gentrification with many new housing developments. The constituency continues to have high levels of deprivation, particularly in its east, whilst Dalston and Shoreditch are comparatively wealthier. Shoreditch is known for being a fashionable part of the city associated with the creative industries. The average house price across the constituency is higher than the rest of London and more than double the national average.

In general, residents of the constituency are young, well-educated and have very low rates of homeownership. They have average levels of professional employment and household income is lower than the rest of London but higher than the national average. Half of residents were White at the 2021 census, around two-fifths of whom were of non-British origin. Black people were the largest ethnic minority group at 24% and Asians were 11%. There are also large Turkish and Kurdish communities in the area. The vast majority of seats in the constituency at the local borough council are represented by the Labour Party, with some Green Party representation in Dalston. Voters in the constituency overwhelmingly supported remaining in the European Union in the 2016 referendum; an estimated 79% voted to remain, the sixth-highest rate out of 650 constituencies nationwide.

== History ==
The seat was created in February 1974 from the former seat of Shoreditch and Finsbury.

Ronald Brown was elected in 1974 as a representative of the Labour Party but defected from the Opposition to join the fledgling Social Democratic Party (SDP) in 1981, at a time when Labour wished for Common Market withdrawal and the removal of keeping a nuclear deterrent during the Cold War. Brown held the seat as an SDP member until 1983, when he was defeated by Labour Party candidate Brian Sedgemore. Sedgemore announced his retirement from parliament at the 2005 election; but on 26 April 2005, after Parliament had been dissolved and he was no longer the sitting MP, defected to the Liberal Democrats, the successors to the SDP, shortly before the week of the election. The Liberal Democrats were unable to capitalise on the defection, their candidate only gaining the second largest gain in votes of the candidates competing.

In the 2016 referendum to leave the European Union, the constituency voted remain by 77.9%. This was the ninth highest support for remain for a constituency.

Election Record

All elections since the seat's creation have been won by the Labour candidate, including the incumbent, Meg Hillier, with substantial majorities, making it a Labour stronghold. The 2015 result ranked the seat the 16th safest of the party's 232 seats (by majority percentage) and fifth safest in the capital.

== Boundaries ==
=== Historic ===
1974–1983: The London Borough of Hackney wards of Dalston, De Beauvoir, Haggerston, Moorfields, Queensbridge, Victoria, and Wenlock.

Map of boundaries 2010–2024

1983–2010: The London Borough of Hackney wards of Chatham, Dalston, De Beauvoir, Haggerston, Homerton, King's Park, Moorfields, Queensbridge, Victoria, Wenlock, Westdown, and Wick.

2010–2014: The London Borough of Hackney wards of Chatham, De Beauvoir, Hackney Central, Haggerston, Hoxton, King's Park, Queensbridge, Victoria, and Wick.

2014–2024: Following a review of ward boundaries which did not effect the parliamentary boundaries, from May 2014 the constituency comprised the following wards:

- De Beauvoir, Hackney Central, Hackney Wick, Haggerston, Homerton, Hoxton East & Shoreditch, Hoxton West, King's Park, Lea Bridge (small part), London Fields (most), and Victoria.

=== Current ===
Further to the 2023 review of Westminster constituencies, which came into effect for the 2024 general election, the constituency is composed of:

- The London Borough of Hackney wards of Dalston, Hackney Central, Hackney Wick, Haggerston, Homerton, Hoxton East & Shoreditch, Hoxton West, London Fields, and Victoria.

De Beauvoir ward was transferred out to Islington South and Finsbury, and King's Park ward to Hackney North and Stoke Newington, in exchange for Dalston ward.

The constituency covers the southern part of the London Borough of Hackney.

The constituency shares a boundary with eight others: Walthamstow, Leyton and Wanstead, Stratford and Bow, Bethnal Green and Stepney, Cities of London and Westminster, Islington South and Finsbury, Islington North, and its borough partner Hackney North and Stoke Newington.

== Members of Parliament ==
Election	Member	Party
Feb 1974	Ronald Brown	Labour
1981	Ronald Brown	SDP
1983	Brian Sedgemore	Labour
2005	Meg Hillier	Labour Co-operative

== Election results ==
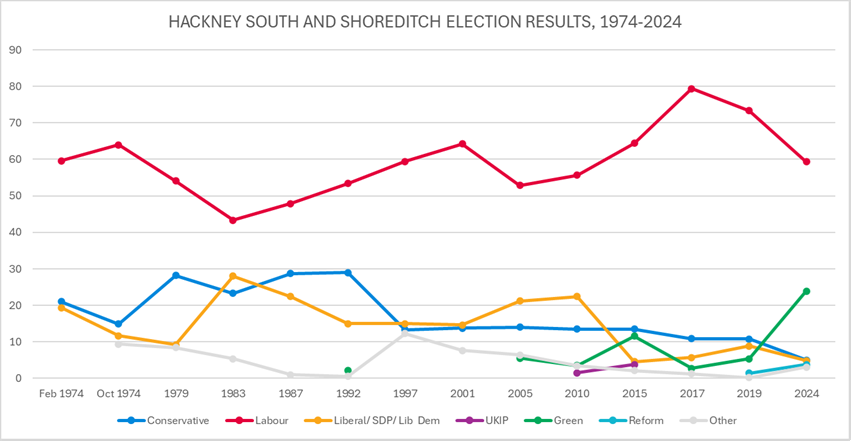
Election results 1974–2024

=== Elections in the 2020s ===
General election 2024: Hackney South and Shoreditch
Party	Candidate	Votes	%	±%
Labour Co-op	Meg Hillier	24,724	59.3	−14.1
Green	Laura-Louise Fairley	9,987	23.9	+17.5
Conservative	Joanna Reeves	2,076	5.0	−5.4
Liberal Democrats	Theo Roos	1,996	4.8	−3.4
Reform	Anil Bhatti	1,601	3.8	+2.4
Workers Party	Shahed Hussain	1,007	2.4	New
Workers Revolutionary	Carol Small	310	0.7	+0.5
Majority		14,737	35.4	−27.6
Turnout		41,701	53.3	−10.3
Registered electors		78,262		
Labour Co-op hold		Swing	−15.8	

=== Elections in the 2010s ===
2019 notional result
Party	Vote	%
Labour	35,109	73.4
Conservative	4,968	10.4
Liberal Democrats	3,900	8.2
Green	3,081	6.4
Brexit Party	648	1.4
Others	111	0.2
Turnout	47,817	63.6
Electorate	75,197	

General election 2019: Hackney South and Shoreditch
Party	Candidate	Votes	%	±%
Labour Co-op	Meg Hillier	39,884	73.3	−6.1
Conservative	Mark Beckett	5,899	10.8	−0.1
Liberal Democrats	Dave Raval	4,853	8.9	+3.2
Green	Tyrone Scott	2,948	5.4	+2.7
Brexit Party	Robert Lloyd	744	1.4	New
Workers Revolutionary	Jonty Leff	111	0.2	0.0
Majority		33,985	62.5	−6.0
Turnout		54,439	60.9	−5.7
Registered electors		89,380		
Labour Co-op hold		Swing	−3.1	

General election 2017: Hackney South and Shoreditch
Party	Candidate	Votes	%	±%
Labour Co-op	Meg Hillier	43,974	79.4	+15.0
Conservative	Luke Parker	6,043	10.9	−2.6
Liberal Democrats	Dave Raval	3,168	5.7	+1.1
Green	Rebecca Johnson	1,522	2.7	−8.9
Animal Welfare	Vanessa Hudson	226	0.4	New
Independent	Russell Higgs	143	0.3	+0.1
CPA	Angel Watt	113	0.2	−0.3
Workers Revolutionary	Jonty Leff	86	0.2	0.0
Independent	Hugo Sugg	50	0.1	New
Independent	Dale Kalamazad	29	0.1	New
Majority		37,931	68.5	+17.6
Turnout		55,354	66.6	+10.6
Registered electors		83,099		
Labour Co-op hold		Swing	+8.8	

General election 2015: Hackney South and Shoreditch
Party	Candidate	Votes	%	±%
Labour Co-op	Meg Hillier	30,633	64.4	+8.7
Conservative	Jack Tinley	6,420	13.5	0.0
Green	Charlotte George	5,519	11.6	+8.1
Liberal Democrats	Ben Mathis	2,186	4.6	−17.8
UKIP	Angus Small	1,818	3.8	+2.3
TUSC	Brian Debus	302	0.6	New
CISTA	Paul Birch	297	0.6	New
CPA	Taiwo Adewuyi	236	0.5	New
Independent	Russell Higgs	78	0.2	New
Workers Revolutionary	Bill Rogers	63	0.1	New
Campaign	Gordon Shrigley	28	0.1	New
Majority		24,213	50.9	+17.6
Turnout		47,580	56.0	−2.9
Registered electors		84,971		
Labour Co-op hold		Swing	+4.4	

General election 2010: Hackney South and Shoreditch
Party	Candidate	Votes	%	±%
Labour Co-op	Meg Hillier	23,888	55.7	+1.9
Liberal Democrats	Dave Raval	9,600	22.4	+1.6
Conservative	Simon Nayyar	5,800	13.5	+0.1
Green	Polly Lane	1,493	3.5	−2.0
UKIP	Michael King	651	1.5	New
Liberal	Ben Rae	539	1.3	New
Christian	John Williams	434	1.0	New
Direct Democracy (Communist)	Nusret Sen	202	0.5	New
Communist League	Paul Davies	110	0.3	New
Independent	Denny de la Haye	95	0.2	New
Independent	Jane Tuckett	26	0.1	New
Independent	Michael Spinks	20	0.0	New
Majority		14,288	33.3	+0.3
Turnout		42,858	58.9	+7.5
Registered electors		64,826		
Labour Co-op hold		Swing	+0.1	

=== Elections in the 2000s ===
General election 2005: Hackney South and Shoreditch
Party	Candidate	Votes	%	±%
Labour Co-op	Meg Hillier	17,048	52.9	−11.3
Liberal Democrats	Hugh G. Bayliss	6,844	21.2	+6.6
Conservative	John Moss	4,524	14.0	+0.2
Green	Ipemndoh dan Iyan	1,779	5.5	New
Respect	Dean Ryan	1,437	4.5	New
Liberal	Benjamin Rae	313	1.0	New
Communist	Monty Goldman	200	0.6	−0.3
Workers Revolutionary	Jonty Leff	92	0.3	−0.2
Majority		10,204	31.7	−17.9
Turnout		32,237	49.7	+2.3
Registered electors		72,841		
Labour Co-op hold		Swing	−9.0	

General election 2001: Hackney South and Shoreditch
Party	Candidate	Votes	%	±%
Labour	Brian Sedgemore	19,471	64.2	+4.8
Liberal Democrats	Anthony Vickers	4,422	14.6	−0.4
Conservative	Paul White	4,180	13.8	+0.5
Socialist Alliance	Cecilia Prosper	1,401	4.6	New
Reform 2000	Saim Koksal	471	1.6	New
Communist	Ivan Beavis	259	0.9	0.0
Workers Revolutionary	William Rogers	143	0.5	+0.1
Majority		15,049	49.6	+5.2
Turnout		30,347	47.4	−7.1
Registered electors		63,990		
Labour hold		Swing	+2.6	

=== Elections in the 1990s ===
General election 1997: Hackney South and Shoreditch
Party	Candidate	Votes	%	±%
Labour	Brian Sedgemore	20,048	59.4	+6.0
Liberal Democrats	Martin J. Pantling	5,058	15.0	+0.1
Conservative	Christopher P. O'Leary	4,494	13.3	−15.7
Independent	Terry V. Betts	2,436	7.2	New
Referendum	Richard Franklin	613	1.8	New
BNP	Gordon T. Callow	531	1.6	New
Communist	Monty Goldman	298	0.9	New
Natural Law	Michelle L. Goldberg	145	0.4	−0.2
Workers Revolutionary	William Rogers	139	0.4	New
Majority		14,990	44.4	+20.0
Turnout		33,762	54.5	−9.3
Registered electors		62,000		
Labour hold		Swing	+3.00	

General election 1992: Hackney South and Shoreditch
Party	Candidate	Votes	%	±%
Labour	Brian Sedgemore	19,730	53.4	+5.5
Conservative	Andrew Turner	10,714	29.0	+0.3
Liberal Democrats	George Wintle	5,533	15.0	−7.4
Green	Len Lucas	772	2.1	New
Natural Law	Geraldine Norman	226	0.6	New
Majority		9,016	24.4	+5.2
Turnout		36,975	63.8	+8.4
Registered electors		57,935		
Labour hold		Swing		

=== Elections in the 1980s ===
General election 1987: Hackney South and Shoreditch
Party	Candidate	Votes	%	±%
Labour	Brian Sedgemore	18,799	47.9	+4.6
Conservative	Michael Northcroft-Brown	11,277	28.7	+5.4
Liberal	Jeffrey Roberts	8,812	22.4	+12.7
Communist	David Green	403	1.0	+0.4
Majority		7,522	19.2	−0.8
Turnout		32,291	55.4	+1.6
Registered electors		70,873		
Labour hold		Swing		

General election 1983: Hackney South and Shoreditch
Party	Candidate	Votes	%	±%
Labour	Brian Sedgemore	16,621	43.3	−12.5
Conservative	Peter J.P. Croft	8,930	23.3	−5.2
SDP	Ronald Brown	7,025	18.3	New
Liberal	Jeffrey Roberts	3,724	9.7	+0.5
Independent Labour	Steven J. Quilty	704	1.8	New
National Front	Ralph Ashton	593	1.6	−6.0
BNP	Valerie D. Tyndall	374	1.0	New
Communist	David Green	246	0.6	New
Workers Revolutionary	R.D. Goldstein	141	0.4	−0.4
Majority		7,691	20.0	−5.9
Turnout		38,358	53.8	−6.3
Registered electors		71,304		
Labour hold		Swing		

- Both Brown and Roberts were official candidates of their respective local parties and both supported the Alliance between the Liberals and the SDP; however, Brown was given endorsement by both national parties.

=== Elections in the 1970s ===
General election 1979: Hackney South and Shoreditch
Party	Candidate	Votes	%	±%
Labour	Ronald Brown	14,016	54.1	−9.9
Conservative	David Evennett	7,312	28.2	+13.3
Liberal	Jeffrey David Roberts	2,387	9.2	−2.5
National Front	John Tyndall	1,958	7.6	−1.8
Workers Revolutionary	Peter Curtis	215	0.8	New
Majority		6,704	25.9	−23.2
Turnout		25,888	60.1	+5.4
Registered electors		43,090		
Labour hold		Swing		

General election October 1974: Hackney South and Shoreditch
Party	Candidate	Votes	%	±%
Labour	Ronald Brown	17,333	64.0	+4.4
Conservative	Harvey Proctor	4,038	14.9	−6.1
Liberal	C. Bone	3,173	11.7	−7.7
National Front	Ronald May	2,544	9.4	New
Majority		13,295	49.1	+10.5
Turnout		27,088	54.7	−8.7
Registered electors		49,540		
Labour hold		Swing		

General election February 1974: Hackney South and Shoreditch
Party	Candidate	Votes	%	±%
Labour	Ronald Brown	18,580	59.6	
Conservative	Harvey Proctor	6,562	21.0	
Liberal	C. Bone	6,053	19.4	
Majority		12,018	38.6	
Turnout		31,195	63.4	
Registered electors		49,204		
Labour win (new seat)				

== See also ==
- List of parliamentary constituencies in Hackney
- Parliamentary constituencies in London

== Sources ==
- Election result, 2005 (BBC)
- Election results, 1997 – 2001 (BBC)
- Election results, 1997 – 2001 (Election Demon)
- Election results, 1983 – 1992 (Election Demon)
- Election results, 1992 – 2005 (Guardian)
- Election results, 1974 – 1979 (Keele University)
