= Dorothy Thurtle =

British women's right activist and politician

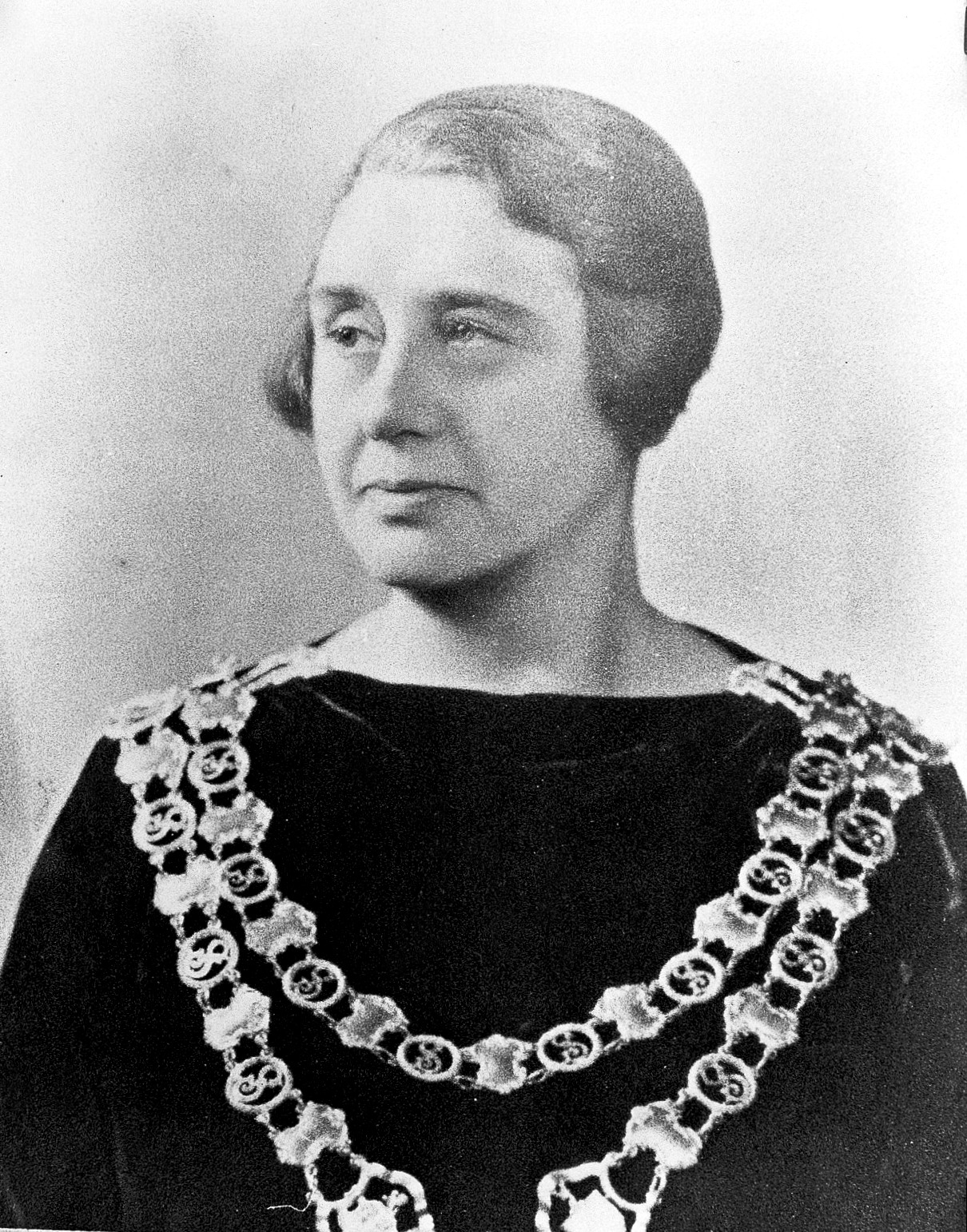
- Official portrait as Mayor of Shoreditch
- Born: Dorothy Lansbury; 15 November 1890; Bow, East London, England
- Died: 28 February 1973 (aged 82); St Albans, Hertfordshire, England
- Occupations: Politician, social activist
- Notable work: Abortion: right or wrong? (1940)

Dorothy Thurtle (née Lansbury; 15 November 1890 – 28 February 1973) was a British women's right activist, a campaigner for contraceptive and abortion rights, and a Labour Party politician.

== Early life ==
She was the sixth child of the eight daughters and four sons of George Lansbury, politician and social reformer, and Labour Party leader from 1932 to 1935, and his wife Elizabeth Jane Lansbury (née Brine).

== Career ==
She was 16 when she became a member of the Independent Labour Party (ILP). She started work as a clerk and accountant, and very soon joined the National Union of Clerks. She joined the Women's Freedom League and the Women's Labour League, but was unhappy with the militant tactics employed by the suffragette movement, and this led to tensions in the family, especially with more militant members including her brother William Lansbury who went to prison in 1913 for breaking windows in support of the Women's Social and Political Union.

In 1924, Thurtle and her husband Ernest Thurtle founded the Workers' Birth Control Group.

Thurtle was the general secretary of Shoreditch Trades Council and Labour Party, and in 1925, was elected to Shoreditch Borough Council, later becoming mayor in 1936. From 1946, she served a term as a member of the London County Council, representing Shoreditch.

Throughout her career, Thurtle was a tireless advocate for working-class women having free access to information on abortion, pressing the Labour Party on this, saying it made nonsense of their supposed commitment to sexual equality.

In 1936, Thurtle became one of the earliest members of the Abortion Law Reform Association (ALRA), and served as a vice-president until her retirement in 1962.

=== Birkett Committee dissenting report ===
Thurtle's most significant contribution to the cause of abortion rights reform was as a member of the Birkett Committee, an interdepartmental committee on abortion and maternal mortality which sat from 1937 to 1939 under the chairmanship of Sir Norman Birkett. Thurtle was the only member of the committee openly supportive of abortion law reform. The report acknowledged that abortion law was frequently and "freely disregarded" for valid reasons, and that backstreet abortions were extremely common, noting that "between 110,000 and 150,000 abortions were carried out annually, 40% of these were criminally induced". The committee majority treated abortion as a medical and legal problem and overlooked the underlying cause, fertility control. It opposed the legalisation of abortion on the grounds that it posed "danger to life and health" and risked being a "temptation to loose and immoral conduct", proposing adjustments to the law to ensure that medical partitioners were acting legally when they undertook an abortion following a medical consultation which determined that the woman's life was in danger, but recommending greater restrictions on abortifacients to prevent self-medication.

Thurtle publicly dissented the committee's conclusions and issued an influential minority report which approached the issue from a fertility standpoint. Thurtle stated that the primary cause of abortion was a "high degree of fertility", a "stark reality" facing all fertile women, and argued that because many married women would face pregnancy every one or two years until their menopause, withholding access to fertility advice and birth control was "a form of class discrimination and penalisation", particularly as maternal death rates rose rapidly after the fifth child. Thurtle's report asserted that abortion was not riskier than childbirth or amateur operations, a view the British Medical Association agreed with – evidence from 95 practitioners provided to the committee by Arthur Leyland Robinson concluded that "setting aside all sentimental and ethical objections, legalised abortion ... would not produce any ... disadvantages and dangers inseparable from operations for the interruption of pregnancy". Based on this, the minority report proposed the creation of local authority birth control clinics and the legalisation of abortion in various circumstances where the woman's life was not in immediate danger: for women who had already had four pregnancies, on eugenical grounds, and in cases of sexual crime, such as rape.

Thurtle's report was praised by the National Council for Equal Citizenship and the ARLA, but otherwise her proposals for "voluntary abortion" (under restrictive criteria, such as four prior pregnancies) received little contemporary support. The limited recommendations of the committee majority were also not implemented, ostensibly due to the outbreak of the Second World War, although the classification of both reports as "non-parliamentary" likely indicated that the government had never intended to enact legislation.

== Personal life ==
In 1912, she married Ernest Thurtle (later MP for Shoreditch). They had two children, a son, Peter, and a daughter, Helen.

== Legacy ==
London's Shoreditch Park contains a memorial garden in her name, laid out in about 1970, and close to the Pitfield Street/Mintern Street entrance.
