= Parliamentary constituencies in Wiltshire =

The location of Wiltshire in England

The English ceremonial county of Wiltshire, which includes the Borough of Swindon, is divided into eight Parliamentary constituencies: one borough constituency and seven county constituencies, including one which spans the county boundary with Gloucestershire. (Note: South Cotswolds is a cross-county boundary constituency between Wiltshire and Gloucestershire.)

== Constituencies ==
† Conservative ‡ Labour ¤ Liberal Democrat ~ Reform UK

Constituency	Electorate	Majority	Member of Parliament	Nearest opposition	Map
Chippenham CC	72,492	8,138	Sarah Gibson¤	Nic Puntis†	
East Wiltshire CC	72,409	4,716	Danny Kruger~ (Note: Kruger defected from the Conservative Party in September 2025.)	Rob Newman‡	
Melksham and Devizes CC	71,999	2,401	Brian Mathew¤	Michelle Donelan†	
Salisbury CC	70,281	3,807	John Glen†	Matt Aldridge‡	
South Cotswolds CC (part)	71,490	4,973	Roz Savage¤	James Gray†	
South West Wiltshire CC	71,574	3,243	Andrew Murrison†	Evelyn Akoto†	
Swindon North CC	73,238	4,103	Will Stone‡	Justin Tomlinson†	
Swindon South BC	72,596	9,606	Heidi Alexander‡	Robert Buckland†	

== Boundary changes ==
=== 2024 ===
See 2023 review of Westminster constituencies for further details.

Former name
1. Chippenham CC
2. Devizes CC
3. North Swindon CC
4. North Wiltshire CC
5. Salisbury CC
6. South Swindon CC
7. South West Wiltshire CC
Boundaries 2010–2024

2010–2024 boundaries

Current name
1. Chippenham CC
2. East Wiltshire CC
3. Melksham and Devizes CC
4. Salisbury CC
5. South Cotswolds CC
6. South West Wiltshire CC
7. Swindon North CC
8. Swindon South BC
Boundaries 2024–present

Post-2024 boundaries

For the 2023 review of Westminster constituencies, which redrew the constituency map ahead of the 2024 general election, the Boundary Commission for England opted to combine Wiltshire with Gloucestershire as a sub-region of the South West Region, with the creation of the cross-county boundary constituency of South Cotswolds, resulting in a major reconfiguration of Chippenham. Devizes and North Wiltshire were abolished and new constituencies, named East Wiltshire, and Melksham and Devizes, created.

The following seats were proposed:

Containing electoral wards in the Borough of Swindon

- East Wiltshire (part)
- Swindon North
- Swindon South

Containing electoral wards in the Wiltshire unitary authority district

- Chippenham
- East Wiltshire (part)
- Melksham and Devizes
- Salisbury
- South Cotswolds (parts also in the Districts of Cotswold and Stroud in Gloucestershire)
- South West Wiltshire

=== 2010 ===
Under the fifth periodic review of Westminster constituencies, the Boundary Commission for England decided to increase the number of seats in Wiltshire from 6 to 7, with the re-establishment of Chippenham, which affected neighbouring constituencies. An adjusted Westbury constituency was renamed South West Wiltshire.

Former name
1. Devizes CC
2. North Swindon CC
3. North Wiltshire CC
4. Salisbury CC
5. South Swindon CC
6. Westbury CC
Boundaries 1997–2010

Parliamentary constituencies in Wiltshire

Current name
1. Chippenham CC
2. Devizes CC
3. North Swindon CC
4. North Wiltshire CC
5. Salisbury CC
6. South Swindon CC
7. South West Wiltshire CC
Boundaries 2010–2024

Proposed Revision

== Results history ==
Primary data source: House of Commons research briefing – General election results from 1918 to 2019

=== 2024 ===
The number of votes cast for each political party who fielded candidates in constituencies comprising Wiltshire in the 2024 general election were as follows: (Note: It should be acknowledged that South Cotswolds is a cross-county constituency between Wiltshire and Gloucestershire. As the results of UK general elections are not disclosed on a sub-constituency level, the following vote shares contain parts of the electorate in the Cotswold and Stroud districts.)

Party	Votes	%	Change from 2019	Seats	Change from 2019
Conservative	125,505	32.6%	▼25.2%	3	▼4
Liberal Democrats	96,677	25.1%	▲6.5%	3	▲3
Labour	89,880	23.3%	▲3.2%	2	▲2
Reform	52,755	13.7%	New	0	New
Greens	16,864	4.4%	▲1.1%	0	0
Others	3,849	1.0%	▲0.4%	0	0
Total	385,530	100.0		8	

=== 2019 ===
The number of votes cast for each political party who fielded candidates in constituencies comprising Wiltshire in the 2019 general election were as follows:

Party	Votes	%	Change from 2017	Seats	Change from 2017
Conservative	217,955	57.8%	▲1.0%	7	0
Labour	77,343	20.1%	▼6.9%	0	0
Liberal Democrats	69,876	18.6%	▲6.7%	0	0
Greens	11,378	3.3%	▲1.2%	0	0
Others	745	0.6%	▼2.0%	0	0
Total	377,297	100.0		7	

=== Percentage votes ===
Election year	1918	1922	1923	1924	1929	1931	1935	1945	1950	1951	1955	1959	1964	1966	1970	1974 (Feb)	1974 (Oct)	1979	1983	1987	1992	1997	2001	2005	2010	2015	2017	2019	2024
Conservative	52.8	50.0	45.7	53.9	43.2	60.7	56.2	41.6	41.0	50.1	49.6	49.3	43.2	43.8	51.0	41.9	40.3	47.4	50.3	51.9	50.9	40.2	42.1	44.3	47.7	52.4	56.8	57.8	32.6
Liberal Democrat^{1}	30.1	34.6	42.9	30.4	34.8	19.1	19.8	18.4	19.6	3.7	8.7	10.7	18.9	15.2	11.7	29.8	30.2	27.5	34.2	31.2	28.7	26.2	25.0	26.9	30.4	11.8	11.8	18.5	25.1
Labour	17.1	15.4	11.4	15.7	21.9	20.2	24.0	39.9	39.2	46.2	41.7	38.7	37.5	40.6	37.2	28.1	29.3	22.8	14.9	16.7	18.3	28.0	29.0	24.3	15.3	17.3	27.4	20.5	23.3
Reform	–	–	–	–	–	–	–	–	–	–	–	–	–	–	–	–	–	–	–	–	–	–	–	–	–	–	–	–	13.7
Green Party	–	–	–	–	–	–	–	–	–	–	–	–	–	–	–	–	–	–	–	*	*	*	*	*	1.0	4.7	1.8	3.0	4.4
UKIP	–	–	–	–	–	–	–	–	–	–	–	–	–	–	–	–	–	–	–	–	–	*	*	*	4.0	13.5	1.8	*	–
Other	–	–	–	–	–	–	–	–	0.1	–	–	1.3	0.4	0.4	0.2	0.3	0.2	2.2	0.7	0.1	2.2	5.6	3.9	4.5	1.6	0.4	0.4	0.2	1.0

^{1}pre-1979 – Liberal Party; 1983 & 1987 – SDP–Liberal Alliance

* Included in Other

=== Seats ===
Election year	1950	1951	1955	1959	1964	1966	1970	1974 (Feb)	1974 (Oct)	1979	1983	1987	1992	1997	2001	2005	2010	2015	2017	2019	2024
Conservative	4	4	4	4	4	4	4	4	4	4	5	5	5	4	4	4	6	7	7	7	3
Liberal Democrat^{1}	0	0	0	0	0	0	0	0	0	0	0	0	0	0	0	0	1	0	0	0	3
Labour	1	1	1	1	1	1	1	1	1	1	0	0	0	2	2	2	0	0	0	0	2
Total	5	5	5	5	5	5	5	5	5	5	5	5	5	6	6	6	7	7	7	7	8

^{1}1974 & 1979 – Liberal Party; 1983 & 1987 – SDP–Liberal Alliance

=== Maps ===
==== 1885–1910 ====
1885

1886

1892

1895

1900

1906

Jan 1910

Dec 1910

==== 1918–1945 ====
1918

1922

1923

1924

1929

1931

1935

1945

==== 1950–1979 ====
1950

1951

1955

1959

1964

1966

1970

1974 Feb

1974 Oct

1979

==== 1983–2019 ====
1983

1987

1992

1997

2001

2005

2010

2015

2017

2019

==== 2024–present ====
2024

== Historical representation by party ==
A cell marked → (with a different colour background to the preceding cell) indicates that the previous MP continued to sit under a new party name.

=== 1885 to 1918 (6 seats) ===
Conservative Liberal Liberal Unionist

Constituency	1885	1886	1892	1895	97	98	00	1900	05	1906	Jan 1910	Dec 1910	11	18
Cricklade	Maskelyne	→	Husband	Hopkinson		FitzMaurice				Massie	Calley	Lambert		
Chippenham	Fletcher	Bruce	Dickson-Poynder						→		Terrell			
Devizes	Long		Hobhouse	Goulding						Rogers	Peto			
Salisbury	Grenfell	Hulse			Allhusen			Palmer		Tennant	Locker-Lampson			
Westbury	Fuller			Chaloner				Fuller					Howard	
Wilton	Grove	→	Pleydell-Bouverie				J. Morrison			Morse	Bathurst			H. Morrison

=== 1918 to 1974 (5 seats) ===
Conservative Labour Liberal

Constituency	1918	1922	1923	1924	27	1929	31	1931	34	1935	42	43	1945	1950	1951	1955	1959	62	64	1964	65	1966	69	1970
Chippenham	Terrell	Bonwick		Cazalet								Eccles						Awdry						
Westbury	Palmer	Darbishire		Shaw	Long			Grimston												Walters				
Devizes	Bell		Macfadyen	Hurd									Hollis			Pott			C. Morrison					
Salisbury	H. Morrison		Moulton	H. Morrison			Despencer-Robertson				J. Morrison										Hamilton			
Swindon	Young	Banks				Addison		Banks	Addison	Wakefield			Reid			Noel-Baker							Ward	Stoddart

=== 1974 to 2010 (5, then 6 seats) ===
Conservative Labour Liberal Democrats

Constituency	Feb 1974	Oct 1974	1979	1983	1987	1992	1997	2001	2005
Chippenham / N Wiltshire (1983)	Awdry		Needham				Gray		
Devizes	Morrison					Ancram			
Salisbury	Hamilton			Key					
Westbury	Walters					Faber		Murrison	
Swindon / South Swindon (1997)	Stoddart			Coombs			Drown		Snelgrove
North Swindon							Wills		

=== 2010 to present (7, then 7.5 seats) ===
Conservative Labour Liberal Democrats Reform UK

Constituency	2010	2015	2017	2019	2024	25
Chippenham	Hames	Donelan			Gibson	
Devizes / East Wiltshire (2024)	Perry			Kruger		→
North Wiltshire / Melksham and Devizes (2024)	Gray				Mathew	
Salisbury	Glen					
South West Wiltshire	Murrison					
Swindon North	Tomlinson				Stone	
Swindon South	Buckland				Alexander	

From 2024, part of northern Wiltshire was included in the South Cotswolds constituency, slightly more than half of which lies in Gloucestershire. Its representation is covered at List of parliamentary constituencies in Gloucestershire.

== See also ==
- Parliamentary constituencies in South West England
