= Derek Scott (political adviser) =

British political adviser (1947–2012)

Prime Minister's Economic Adviser, Number 10 Policy Unit
- In office 1997–2003
- Prime Minister: Tony Blair
- Succeeded by: Arnab Banerji

Personal details
- Born: 17 January 1947 Bromsgrove, England
- Died: 1 August 2012 (aged 65) London, England
- Party: Labour (until 1981; 1988–2012); SDP (1981–88)
- Spouses: Elinor Goodman (m. 1985; div. 2007); Gisela Stuart (m. 2010)
- Education: Liverpool University; London School of Economics; Birkbeck, University of London

Derek John Scott (17 January 1947 – 1 August 2012) was a British economist and political adviser. On the right wing of the Labour Party, he advised both James Callaghan and Tony Blair on economic matters, spending six years as a key member of the latter's office following Labour's return to Government in 1997. A Eurosceptic, Scott spoke out vigorously against the campaign for Britain to join the eurozone during the early 2000s, which amongst other things led him to become an increasingly isolated figure within 10 Downing Street.

== Background ==
The son of a jeweller, Scott grew up in Bromsgrove, Worcestershire. He left Bromsgrove School without any A-levels at the age of 16, preferring to work alongside his father in the jewellery trade. But, realising he had "made a mistake," he was later admitted as a mature student to Liverpool University, where he graduated with a B.A. (Hons.) in history. Scott then went on, as a postgraduate, to study industrial relations and personnel management at the London School of Economics and economics at Birkbeck College, London.

== Early career, 1972–1997 ==
Upon completing his graduate studies, Scott was employed as head of research for the Electrical Power Engineers' Association, a white-collar trade union led at that time by figures associated with the market-friendly Labour right, most notably its new general secretary, John Lyons. To his surprise, Scott was then invited by Denis Healey, the Chancellor of the Exchequer in the 1974–79 Labour Government, to become one of his special advisers. This was, as one of Scott's colleagues noted, a good match, for he was "more Denis Healey than Denis Healey... Like Healey, he had extraordinarily strong views and a low opinion of people who didn't share those views." Those "strong views" included a commitment to stout defence policies and the nuclear deterrent, a dislike of command-and-control economic policy, and a suspicion of European integration. Scott admired Healey for his "self-confidence" and "big intellect" while Healey valued Scott's ability to "hold his own with Treasury officials."

After Labour was voted out of office in 1979 Scott left Healey to become an economic adviser to the departing Prime Minister, James Callaghan, who remained the leader of the party for a further year. In 1981, however, he defected to the Social Democratic Party (SDP), a breakaway from Labour's right wing. Although uneasy about leaving Labour, he tried unsuccessfully to persuade his friend Peter Mandelson to depart with him. Scott advised the SDP leader David Owen on economic policy and was a Parliamentary candidate, but otherwise kept a low profile within the new party. When the majority of the SDP's members chose to merge with the Liberal Party to form the Liberal Democrats in 1988, Scott remained aloof; but he refused to align with Owen's rump 'continuing' SDP either, instead becoming one of the first SDP defectors to rejoin the Labour Party.

When Scott joined the SDP he lost much of his influence at Westminster, leading him to focus on developing a career in international finance, firstly as a policy adviser to Shell International and then as Director of European Economics at the merchant bank Barclays de Zoete Wedd (BZW). However, after Tony Blair succeeded John Smith as the Labour Party's leader in 1994, he returned to front-line politics, becoming Blair's part-time economic adviser on the recommendation of Mandelson, now a Labour MP and Opposition whip. Although not Blair's first choice (he wanted Gavyn Davies, then a senior economist at Goldman Sachs), Scott was in tune with the new leadership's agenda, as demonstrated by the content of Blair's 1995 Mais Lecture on the Economic Framework for New Labour. This lecture, which Scott had assisted in drafting, emphasised many of the policy objectives that he diagnosed as crucial to Britain's future economic success, namely keeping inflation low, sustaining long-term macroeconomic stability to encourage further investment, and supporting the merits of the financial sector in London over those of German-influenced stakeholder capitalism.

== Adviser in government, 1997–2003 ==
Following Labour's election victory in 1997, Scott left BZW to take up a full-time role as the new Prime Minister's economic adviser at the Number 10 Policy Unit. However, he considered his influence to have been circumscribed by what he claimed was Blair's willingness to cede virtually all control over economic policy to the Chancellor, Gordon Brown. Although Scott agreed with Brown on many aspects of policy, he was damaged by the Chancellor's refusal to engage with the Prime Minister's Office at anything beyond a perfunctory level. The Times reported in 1999 that Ed Balls and Charlie Whelan, Brown's special advisers, had kept Scott "away from all major decisions on the economy and Gordon Brown's budgets," thus leaving him out of the loop and with no outlet to critique Treasury decisions such as the "stealth tax" on private pension funds (when Brown denied Scott access to Treasury and Inland Revenue data). This was, in Scott's view, a "pretty extraordinary way to treat the Prime Minister's Office."

Scott also suffered from the fact that he was neither clubbable nor emollient, with an outsized contrary streak – he once wrote that "if all the most eminent of any profession... are lined up behind a proposition, it sets alarm bells ringing in my mind." Nor did he seek to become a senior member of the inner circle at 10 Downing Street: although identifying strongly with the Blairite tendency he could be as critical of Blair as he was of Brown, disparaging the Prime Minister for his scant knowledge of economics and hesitancy in challenging Brown on policy matters. Blair himself seems to have viewed Scott as a peripheral figure, rarely mentioning him in his autobiography; when he did so it was usually with an air of wary affection, acknowledging Scott's "freethinking" capabilities but viewing him as "uncontrollable" and liable to "go off faster than the average firecracker." Other colleagues dismissed Scott as a Cassandra-like voice who was unlikely to sway opinion.

However, the issue that led to a permanent cleavage between Scott and the Government was Europe. Scott – whose hostility towards the single European currency was heavily influenced by the economist Bernard Connolly, author of The Rotten Heart of Europe (Note: Connolly thanks Scott in the preface of his book. See Bernard Connolly, The Rotten Heart of Europe: the Dirty War for Europe's Money (London: Faber and Faber, 1996), p. xiii. ISBN 057117521X) – perceived Blair as a 'true believer' who was determined to take Britain into monetary union with Europe regardless of the prevailing economic arguments. He argued that Blair caricatured the position of those who thought differently to him on the matter and made assertions in support of monetary union as if they were self-evident truths. Scott's fear that Blair wished to hold a "euro referendum" to help secure his legacy was not alleviated by the Treasury's introduction of 'the five economic tests' for membership, which Scott believed "only addressed second-order questions" and were designed on the basis that joining the eurozone was still fundamentally a desirable objective to be achieved in the near-future when conditions were right. For a pro-European Prime Minister to be guided by such a convinced Eurosceptic was clearly a paradox, and with further conflict over the European Constitution looming on the horizon and no likelihood of a thaw in relations with the Treasury, Scott eventually chose to resign from the Prime Minister's Office in 2003.

== After government, 2003–2012 ==
Scott's resignation prompted a return to the financial sector, and he became an economic consultant to KPMG in 2004 and an adviser to Europe Economics the following year. However, his main preoccupation at this time was campaigning against the prospect of Britain adopting the euro. He joined the centre-left anti-euro advocacy group New Europe, led by Lord Owen, and through its association with the similarly Eurosceptic Business for Sterling eventually became a deputy chairman of Open Europe, a think-tank which had been formed in 2005 to oppose the Lisbon Treaty. He was also involved in the pressure group I Want A Referendum, which campaigned for a vote on the European Constitution and was accused by the Labour MP Andy Slaughter of being a "dishonest" Conservative Party front aimed at destabilising the Labour Party, something which Scott denied. In April 2012, shortly before his death, Scott chaired the inaugural Wolfson Economics Prize, which offered £250,000 to the team that could come up with the most satisfactory plan for dismantling the euro.

In 2004, Scott published Off Whitehall, a memoir recounting his experiences as a political adviser, which was depicted in much of the press as an inflammatory account of the goings-on behind closed doors at Number 10. Sir Andrew Turnbull, the Cabinet Secretary, pressed Scott to remove sections of the book prior to publication, citing government confidentiality rules, while broadsheet newspapers reported Brown's fury at what was portrayed therein (which he seemingly regarded as evidence of a Blairite campaign against him). When the book was eventually serialised in The Sunday Times, attention fell on Scott's evocation of 'the Blair-Brown split' in Government, in particular his revelation that Brown had continually withheld information from Blair, leaving the latter unaware of the Treasury's intentions on many issues. Discussing his book with David Frost on the BBC television programme Breakfast with Frost, Scott retold the most eye-catching story:

… there was one incident and we didn't know too much of what was in the budget, the Chancellor and his advisors were summoned, came in and he gave a rather long discussion and Tony after a while said 'well what about the budget Gordon?' and Gordon grabbed his papers and said 'I haven't made my mind up yet,' and Tony then said 'well can you give us a hint,' and the meeting then broke up.

The Observer columnist William Keegan noted that, beyond colourful details such as these, Scott's book was not intended to be salacious. "The 'fiery' bits", Keegan remarked, "are few and far between. It is a serious book about the economics of the eurozone." Indeed, the book's final chapters were given over to Scott's one-man campaign to dissuade Blair from placing so much of his faith in Europe, and also to a series of prognostications about the future of the European Union (EU) – especially in relation to the Lisbon Treaty and economic and monetary union, which he predicted would eventually spell danger for the EU's more fragile economies, such as Greece, Spain and Portugal.

== Parliamentary ambitions ==
Scott's first foray into electoral politics came in 1973, when he stood for Labour in Kensington at that year's Greater London Council election and was narrowly beaten by his Conservative opponent. The following year, he was elected to represent Kelfield ward on Kensington and Chelsea Council, serving a four-year term. Upon joining the SDP, he contested Swindon in his new party colours at the 1983 and 1987 general elections. Failing to win in either instance, his vote was nevertheless high enough in 1983 to ensure the defeat of the sitting Labour MP, David Stoddart – thus earning the latter's undying enmity, even though both men were later to become allies in resisting imposition of the single European currency.

After returning to Labour in 1988 Scott sought a winnable constituency to fight, but his reputation as someone who had abandoned the party and then 're-ratted' left him unable to find a constituency Labour party (CLP) prepared to select him. At the 1993 Newbury by-election, local party activists recalled his previous association with the SDP in Swindon and declined to choose him as their candidate, a situation that repeated itself at the 1997 general election when Lord Stoddart ambushed Scott's chances with the CLP in Worcester by reminding "senior Labour people" of his erstwhile SDP loyalties. Perhaps Scott's greatest opportunity came at that same election, when he sought the party nomination at Pontefract and Castleford, a predominantly industrial seat in Yorkshire with a Labour majority of over 23,000. Again, however, his political 'baggage' hurt his prospects – but this time it was due to his depiction in the press as 'Blair's candidate', which was rumoured to be the reason why he lost the ensuing selection battle to Yvette Cooper, then still in her twenties. This somewhat bruising experience was said to have left Scott resentful of the stigma attached to being seen as one of Blair's scions.

== Personal life ==
Scott's first wife was the Channel 4 News reporter Elinor Goodman, whom he married in 1985. After their divorce in 2007 he married again, this time to the Labour MP Gisela Stuart (née Gschaider), who had beaten him in the race to become the party's candidate for Worcestershire and South Warwickshire at the 1994 European Parliament election.

Scott was a supporter of Aston Villa Football Club. He died of stomach cancer on 1 August 2012, and was survived by his wife.

== Publications ==
- Scott, Derek, Off Whitehall: A View from Downing Street by Tony Blair's Adviser (London: I.B. Tauris, 2004). ISBN 9781850436775
