= 1934 Swindon by-election =

UK Parliamentary by-election

The 1934 Swindon by-election was held on 25 October 1934. The by-election was held due to the appointment as county court judge of the incumbent Conservative MP, Reginald Mitchell Banks. It was won by the Labour candidate Christopher Addison.

Swindon by-election 1934
Party	Candidate	Votes	%	±%
Labour	Christopher Addison	20,902	53.4	+8.3
Conservative	Wavell Wakefield	18,253	46.6	−8.3
Majority		2,649	6.8	N/A
Turnout		39,155	81.8	−3.7
Labour gain from Conservative		Swing		
