= Causes of the eurozone crisis =

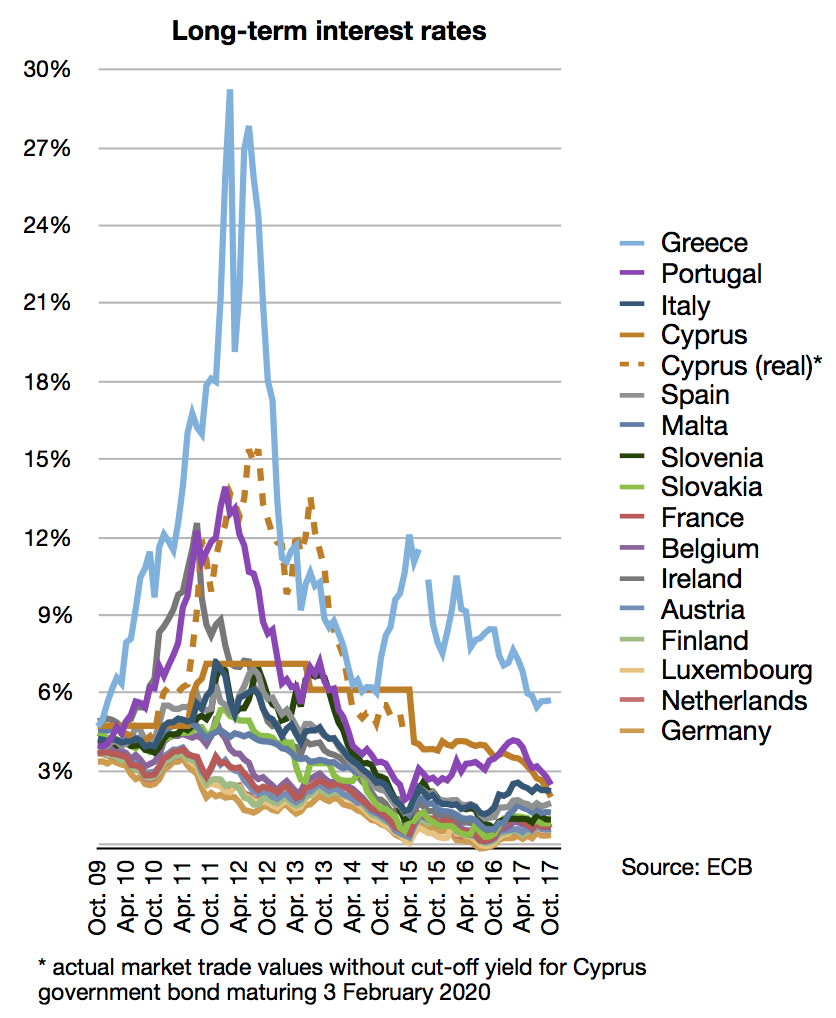

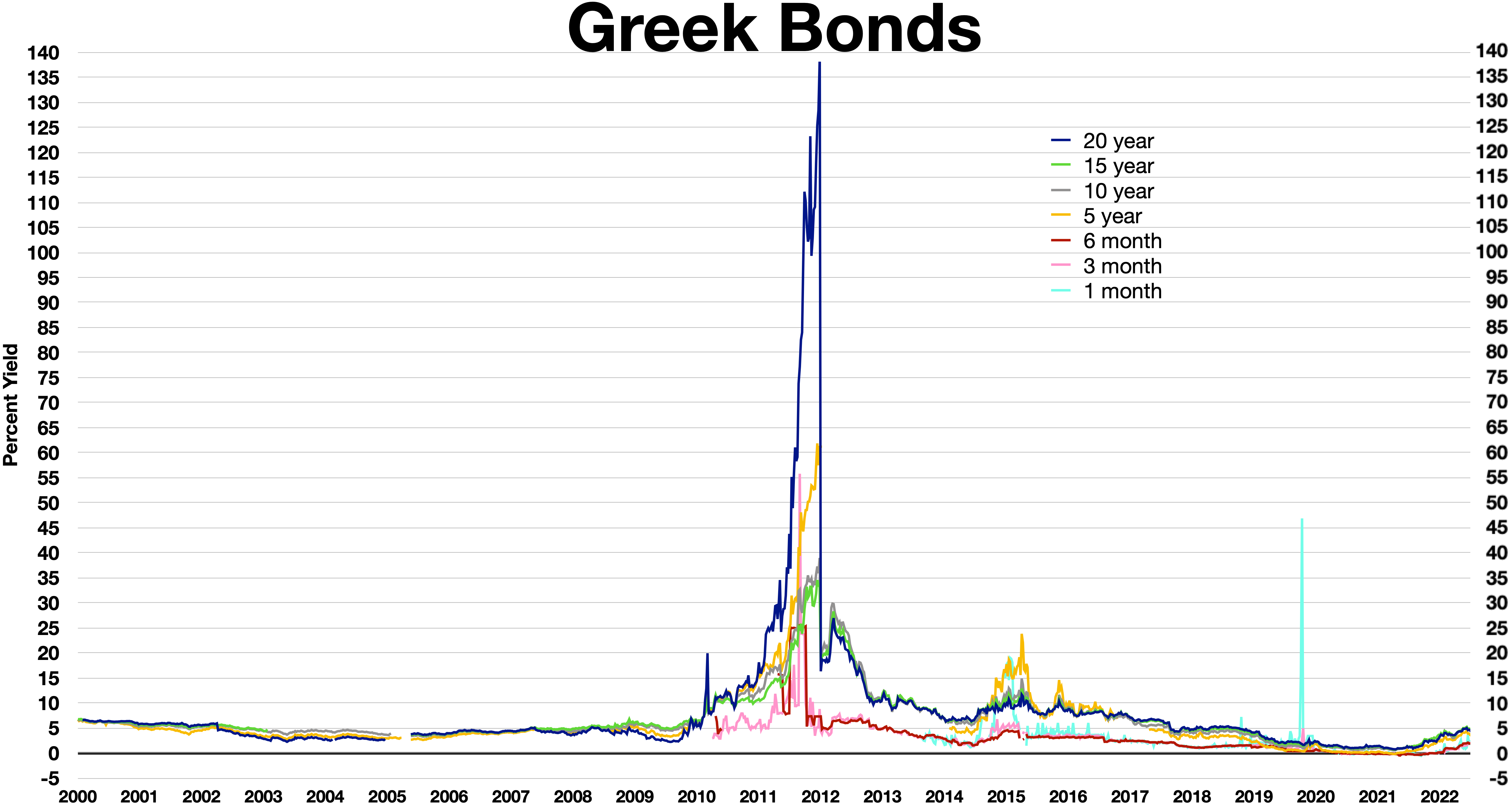
Greek bonds 20 year 15 year 10 year 5 year 1 year 3 month 1 month

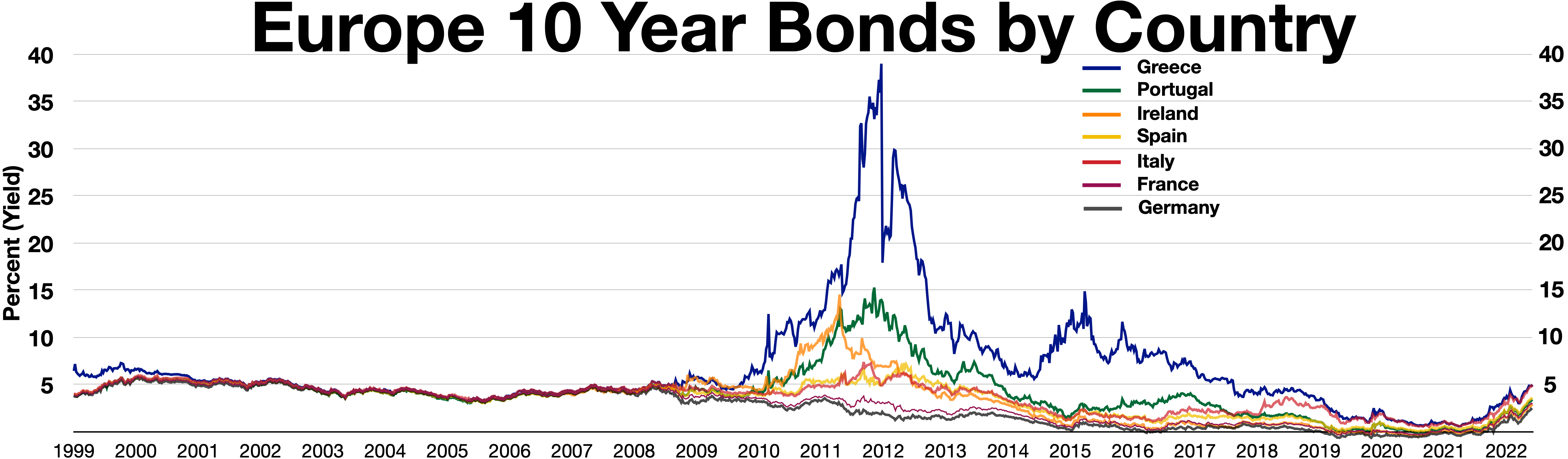
European 10 year bonds, before the Great Recession in Europe bonds floated together in parity Greece 10 year bond Portugal 10 year bond Ireland 10 year bond Spain 10 year bond Italy 10 year bond France 10 year bond Germany 10 year bond

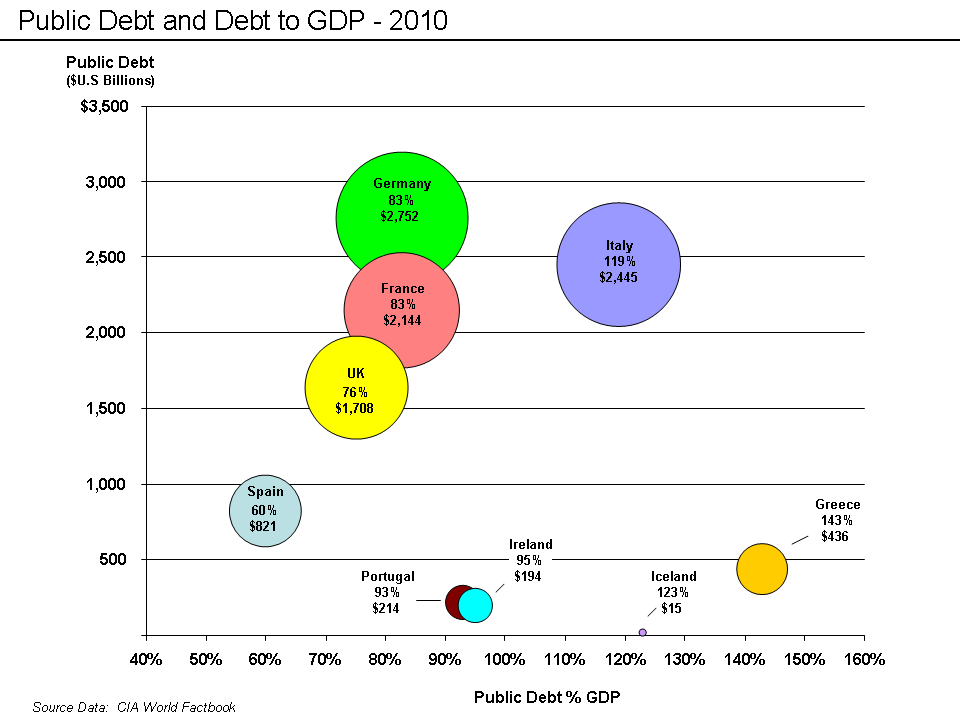
Public debt $ and %GDP (2010) for selected European countries

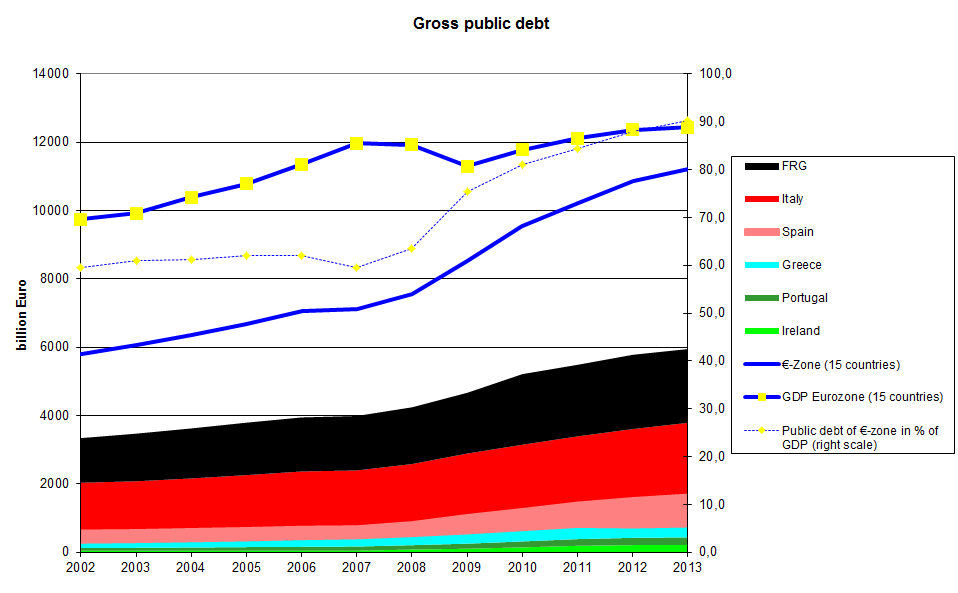
Government debt of Eurozone, Germany and crisis countries compared to Eurozone GDP

The European debt crisis, often also referred to as the eurozone crisis or the European sovereign debt crisis, was a multi-year debt crisis that took place in the European Union (EU) from 2009 until the mid to late 2010s that made it difficult or impossible for some countries in the euro area to repay or refinance their government debt without the assistance of third parties.

The European sovereign debt crisis resulted from the structural problem of the eurozone and a combination of complex factors, including the globalisation of finance; easy credit conditions during the 2002–2008 period that encouraged high-risk lending and borrowing practices; the 2008 financial crisis; international trade imbalances; real-estate bubbles that have since burst; the Great Recession; fiscal policy choices related to government revenues and expenses; and approaches used by nations to bail out troubled banking industries and private bondholders, assuming private debt burdens or socialising losses.

One narrative describing the causes of the crisis begins with the significant increase in savings available for investment during the 2000–2007 period when the global pool of fixed-income securities increased from approximately $36 trillion in 2000 to $70 trillion by 2007. This "Giant Pool of Money" increased as savings from high-growth developing nations entered global capital markets. Investors searching for higher yields than those offered by U.S. Treasury bonds sought alternatives globally.

The temptation offered by such readily available savings overwhelmed the policy and regulatory control mechanisms in country after country, as lenders and borrowers put these savings to use, generating bubble after bubble across the globe. While these bubbles have burst, causing asset prices (e.g., housing and commercial property) to decline, the liabilities owed to global investors remain at full price, generating questions regarding the solvency of governments and their banking systems.

How each European country involved in this crisis borrowed and invested the money varies. For example, Ireland's banks lent the money to property developers, generating a massive property bubble. When the bubble burst, Ireland's government and taxpayers assumed private debts. In Greece, the government increased its commitments to public workers in the form of extremely generous wage and pension benefits, with the former doubling in real terms over 10 years. Iceland's banking system grew enormously, creating debts to global investors (external debts) several times GDP.

The interconnection in the global financial system means that if one nation defaults on its sovereign debt or enters into recession putting some of the external private debt at risk, the banking systems of creditor nations face losses. For example, in October 2011, Italian borrowers owed French banks $366 billion (net). Should Italy be unable to finance itself, the French banking system and economy could come under significant pressure, which in turn would affect France's creditors and so on. This is referred to as financial contagion. Another factor contributing to interconnection is the concept of debt protection. Institutions entered into contracts called credit default swaps (CDS) that result in payment should default occur on a particular debt instrument (including government issued bonds). But, since multiple CDSs can be purchased on the same security, it is unclear what exposure each country's banking system now has to CDS.

Greece, Italy and other countries tried to artificially reduce their budget deficits deceiving EU officials with the help of derivatives designed by major banks. Although some financial institutions clearly profited in the short run, there was a long lead-up to the crisis.

== Rising household and government debt levels ==
Public debt as a per cent of GDP (2010)

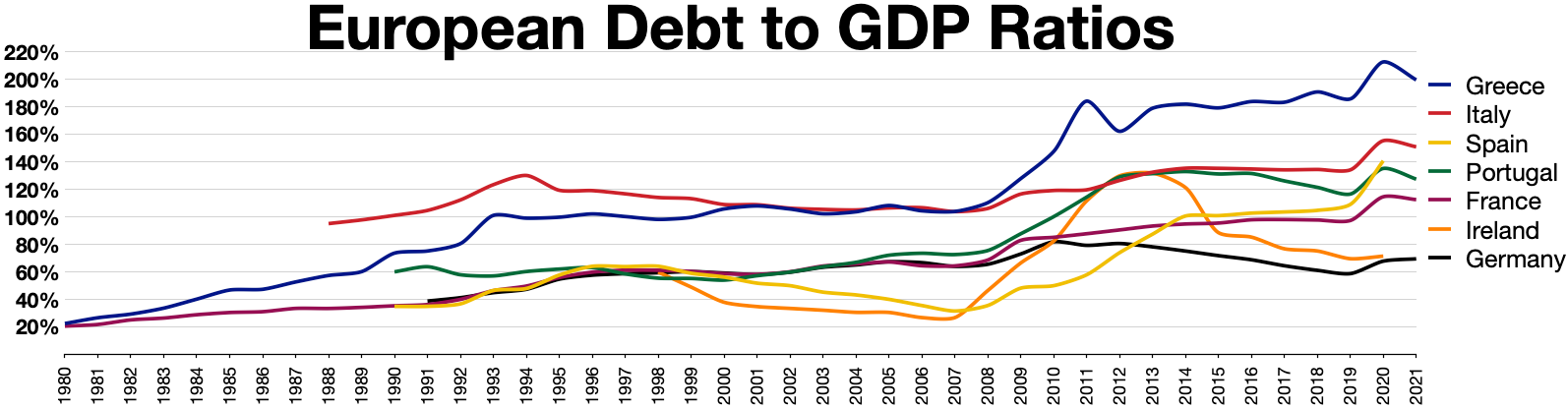
European debt to GDP ratios Greece Italy Spain Portugal France Ireland Germany

In 1992, members of the European Union signed the Maastricht Treaty, under which they pledged to limit their deficit spending and debt levels. However, a number of EU member states, including Greece and Italy, were able to circumvent these rules, failing to abide by their own internal guidelines, sidestepping best practice and ignoring internationally agreed standards. This allowed the sovereigns to mask their deficit and debt levels through a combination of techniques, including inconsistent accounting, off-balance-sheet transactions as well as the use of complex currency and credit derivatives structures. The complex structures were designed by prominent U.S. investment banks, who received substantial fees in return for their services.

The adoption of the euro led to many Eurozone countries of different credit worthiness receiving similar and very low interest rates for their bonds and private credits during years preceding the crisis, which author Michael Lewis referred to as "a sort of implicit Germany guarantee." As a result, creditors in countries with originally weak currencies (and higher interest rates) suddenly enjoyed much more favorable credit terms, which spurred private and government spending and led to an economic boom. In some countries, such as Ireland and Spain, low interest rates also led to a housing bubble, which burst at the height of the financial crisis. Commentators such as Bernard Connolly highlighted this as the fundamental problem of the euro.

A number of economists have dismissed the popular belief that the debt crisis was caused by excessive social welfare spending. According to their analysis, increased debt levels were mostly due to the large bailout packages provided to the financial sector during the 2008 financial crisis, and the global economic slowdown thereafter. The average fiscal deficit in the euro area in 2007 was only 0.6% before it grew to 7% during the Great Recession. In the same period, the average government debt rose from 66% to 84% of GDP. The authors also stressed that fiscal deficits in the euro area were stable or even shrinking since the early 1990s. US economist Paul Krugman named Greece as the only country where fiscal irresponsibility is at the heart of the crisis. British economic historian Robert Skidelsky added that it was indeed excessive lending by banks, not deficit spending that created this crisis. Government's mounting debts are a response to the economic downturn as spending rises and tax revenues fall, not its cause.

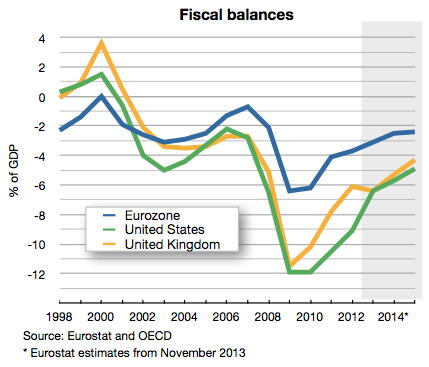
Government deficit of Eurozone compared to USA and UK

Either way, high debt levels alone may not explain the crisis. According to The Economist Intelligence Unit, the position of the euro area looked "no worse and in some respects, rather better than that of the US or the UK." The budget deficit for the euro area as a whole (see graph) is much lower and the euro area's government debt/GDP ratio of 86% in 2010 was about the same level as that of the US. Moreover, private-sector indebtedness across the euro area is markedly lower than in the highly leveraged Anglo-Saxon economies.

== Trade imbalances ==
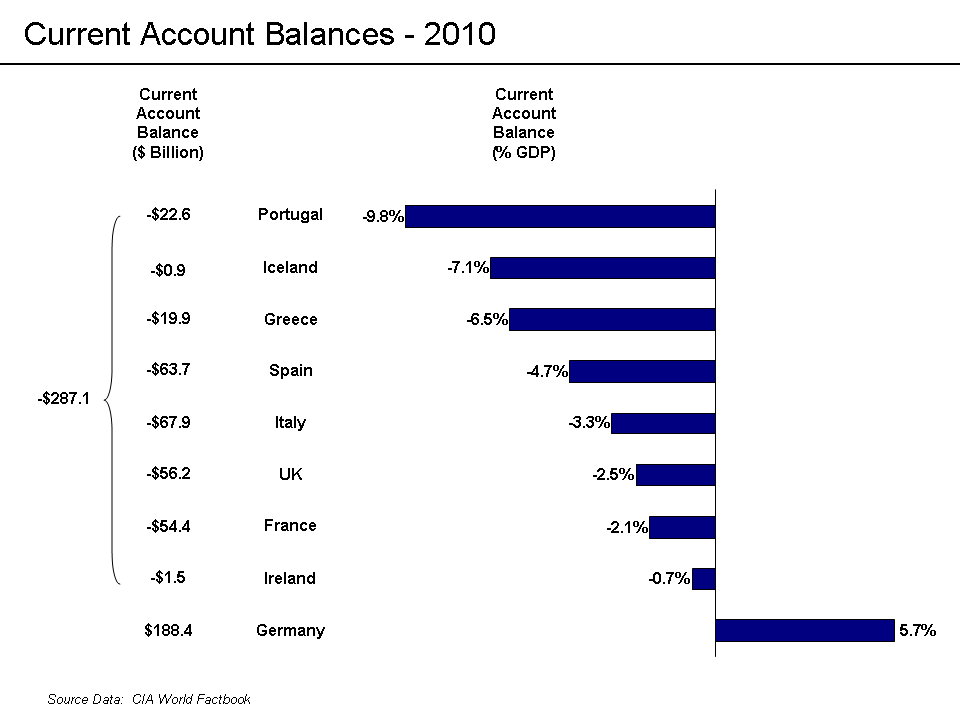
Current account balances relative to GDP (2010)

Commentator and Financial Times journalist Martin Wolf has asserted that the root of the crisis was growing trade imbalances. He notes in the run-up to the crisis, from 1999 to 2007, Germany had a considerably better public debt and fiscal deficit relative to GDP than the most affected eurozone members. In the same period, these countries (Portugal, Ireland, Italy and Spain) had far worse balance of payments positions. Whereas German trade surpluses increased as a percentage of GDP after 1999, the deficits of Italy, France and Spain all worsened.

Paul Krugman wrote in 2009 that a trade deficit by definition requires a corresponding inflow of capital to fund it, which can drive down interest rates and stimulate the creation of bubbles: "For a while, the inrush of capital created the illusion of wealth in these countries, just as it did for American homeowners: asset prices were rising, currencies were strong, and everything looked fine. But bubbles always burst sooner or later, and yesterday's miracle economies have become today's basket cases, nations whose assets have evaporated but whose debts remain all too real."

A trade deficit can also be affected by changes in relative labour costs, which made southern nations less competitive and increased trade imbalances. Since 2001, Italy's unit labour costs rose 32% relative to Germany's. Greek unit labour costs rose much faster than Germany's during the last decade. However, most EU nations had increases in labour costs greater than Germany's. Those nations that allowed "wages to grow faster than productivity" lost competitiveness. Germany's restrained labour costs, while a debatable factor in trade imbalances, are an important factor for its low unemployment rate. More recently, Greece's trading position has improved; in the period 2011 to 2012, imports dropped 20.9% while exports grew 16.9%, reducing the trade deficit by 42.8%.

Simon Johnson explains the hope for convergence in the Eurozone and what went wrong. The euro locks countries into an exchange rate amounting to "very big bet that their economies would converge in productivity". If not, workers would move to countries with greater productivity. Instead the opposite happened: the gap between German and Greek productivity increased, resulting in a large current account surplus financed by capital flows. The capital flows could have been invested to increase productivity in the peripheral nations. Instead capital flows were squandered in consumption and consumptive investments.

Further, Eurozone countries with sustained trade surpluses (i.e., Germany) do not see their currency appreciate relative to the other Eurozone nations due to a common currency, keeping their exports artificially cheap. Germany's trade surplus within the Eurozone declined in 2011 as its trading partners were less able to find financing necessary to fund their trade deficits, but Germany's trade surplus outside the Eurozone has soared as the euro declined in value relative to the dollar and other currencies.

Economic evidence indicates the crisis may have more to do with trade deficits (which require private borrowing to fund) than public debt levels. Economist Paul Krugman wrote in March 2013: "...the really strong relationship within the [eurozone countries] is between interest spreads and current account deficits, which is in line with the conclusion many of us have reached, that the euro area crisis is really a balance of payments crisis, not a debt crisis." A February 2013 paper from four economists concluded that, "Countries with debt above 80% of GDP and persistent current-account [trade] deficits are vulnerable to a rapid fiscal deterioration..."

== Structural problem of Eurozone system ==
One theory is that these problems are caused by a structural contradiction within the euro system, the theory is that there is a monetary union (common currency) without a fiscal union (e.g., common taxation, pension, and treasury functions). In the Eurozone system, the countries are required to follow a similar fiscal path, but they do not have common treasury to enforce it. That is, countries with the same monetary system have freedom in fiscal policies in taxation and expenditure. So, even though there are some agreements on monetary policy and through the European Central Bank, countries may not be able to or would simply choose not to follow it. This feature brought fiscal free riding of peripheral economies, especially represented by Greece, as it is hard to control and regulate national financial institutions. Furthermore, there is also a problem that the Eurozone system has a difficult structure for quick response. Eurozone, having 18 nations as its members, require unanimous agreement for a decision-making process. This would lead to failure in complete prevention of contagion of other areas, as it would be hard for the Eurozone to respond quickly to the problem.

In addition, as of June 2012 there was no "banking union" meaning that there was no Europe-wide approach to bank deposit insurance, bank oversight, or a joint means of recapitalisation or resolution (wind-down) of failing banks. Bank deposit insurance helps avoid bank runs. Recapitalisation refers to injecting money into banks so that they can meet their immediate obligations and resume lending, as was done in 2008 in the U.S. via the Troubled Asset Relief Programme.

Columnist Thomas L. Friedman wrote in June 2012: "In Europe, hyperconnectedness both exposed just how uncompetitive some of their economies were, but also how interdependent they had become. It was a deadly combination. When countries with such different cultures become this interconnected and interdependent – when they share the same currency but not the same work ethics, retirement ages or budget discipline – you end up with German savers seething at Greek workers, and vice versa."

== Monetary policy inflexibility ==
Membership in the Eurozone established a single monetary policy, preventing individual member states from acting independently. In particular they cannot create Euros in order to pay creditors and eliminate their risk of default. Since they share the same currency as their (eurozone) trading partners, they cannot devalue their currency to make their exports cheaper, which in principle would lead to an improved balance of trade, increased GDP and higher tax revenues in nominal terms.

In the reverse direction moreover, assets held in a currency which has devalued suffer losses on the part of those holding them. For example, by the end of 2011, following a 25% fall in the rate of exchange and 5% rise in inflation, eurozone investors in Pound sterling, locked into euro exchange rates, had suffered an approximate 30% cut in the repayment value of this debt.

== Loss of confidence ==
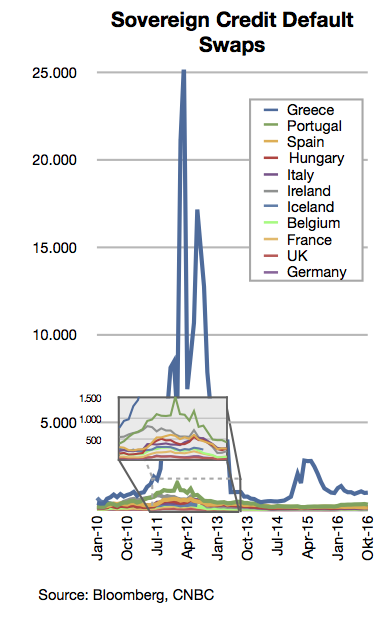
Sovereign CDS prices of selected European countries (2010–2015). The left axis is in basis points; a level of 1,000 means it costs $1 million to protect $10 million of debt for five years.

Prior to development of the crisis it was assumed by both regulators and banks that sovereign debt from the eurozone was safe. Banks had substantial holdings of bonds from weaker economies such as Greece which offered a small premium and seemingly were equally sound. As the crisis developed it became obvious that Greek, and possibly other countries', bonds offered substantially more risk. Contributing to lack of information about the risk of European sovereign debt was conflict of interest by banks that were earning substantial sums underwriting the bonds. The loss of confidence is marked by rising sovereign CDS prices, indicating market expectations about countries' creditworthiness (see graph).

Furthermore, investors have doubts about the possibilities of policy makers to quickly contain the crisis. Since countries that use the euro as their currency have fewer monetary policy choices (e.g., they cannot print money in their own currencies to pay debt holders), certain solutions require multi-national cooperation. Further, the European Central Bank has an inflation control mandate but not an employment mandate, as opposed to the U.S. Federal Reserve, which has a dual mandate.

According to The Economist, the crisis "is as much political as economic" and the result of the fact that the euro area is not supported by the institutional paraphernalia (and mutual bonds of solidarity) of a state. Heavy bank withdrawals have occurred in weaker Eurozone states such as Greece and Spain. Bank deposits in the Eurozone are insured, but by agencies of each member government. If banks fail, it is unlikely the government will be able to fully and promptly honour their commitment, at least not in euros, and there is the possibility that they might abandon the euro and revert to a national currency; thus, euro deposits are safer in Dutch, German, or Austrian banks than they are in Greece or Spain.

As of June 2012, many European banking systems were under significant stress, particularly Spain. A series of "capital calls" (notices that banks required capital) contributed to a freeze in funding markets and interbank lending, as investors worried that banks might be hiding losses or were losing trust in one another.

In June 2012, as the euro hit new lows, there were reports that the wealthy were moving assets out of the Eurozone, and within the Eurozone from the south to the north. Between June 2011 and June 2012 Spain and Italy alone lost 286 bn and 235 bn euros respectively. Altogether, Mediterranean countries have lost assets worth 10% of their GDP since capital flight started at the end of 2010. Mario Draghi, president of the European Central Bank, has called for an integrated European system of deposit insurance, which would require European political institutions to design effective solutions for problems beyond the limits of the power of the European Central Bank. As of 6 June 2012, closer integration of European banking appeared to be under consideration by political leaders.

=== Households' risk aversion ===
Portfolio data and repeated surveys of an Italian bank's clients have shown that investors' risk aversion substantially increased after the 2008 crisis. This encouraged individuals to divest more stock. From a macroeconomic perspective, risk aversion was an important mechanism underlying financial decisions, output, and real money balance dynamics during the European debt crisis.

=== Interest on long term sovereign debt ===
In June 2012, following negotiation of the Spanish bailout line of credit, interest rates on long-term Spanish and Italian debt continued to rise rapidly, casting doubt on the efficacy of bailout packages as anything more than a stopgap measure. The Spanish rate, over 6% before the line of credit was approved, approached 7%, a rough rule of thumb indicator of serious trouble.

=== Rating agency views ===
On 5 December 2011, S&P placed its long-term sovereign ratings on 15 members of the eurozone on "CreditWatch" with negative implications; S&P wrote that this was due to "systemic stresses from five interrelated factors:

1. Tightening credit conditions across the eurozone;
2. Markedly higher risk premiums on a growing number of eurozone sovereigns including some that are currently rated 'AAA';
3. Continuing disagreements among European policy makers on how to tackle the immediate market confidence crisis and, longer term, how to ensure greater economic, financial, and fiscal convergence among eurozone members;
4. High levels of government and household indebtedness across a large area of the eurozone; and
5. The rising risk of economic recession in the eurozone as a whole in 2012. Currently, we expect output to decline next year in countries such as Spain, Portugal and Greece, but we now assign a 40% probability of a fall in output for the eurozone as a whole."

== See also ==
- 2000s commodities boom
- 2008 financial crisis
- 2008–2011 Icelandic financial crisis
- Great Recession
- Crisis situations and unrest in Europe since 2000
- List of acronyms associated with the eurozone crisis
- List of people associated with the eurozone crisis
- Federal Reserve Economic Data
- Great Recession in Europe
- List of countries by credit rating
