= Walter James Young =

Australian businessman (1872–1940)

Sir Walter James Young
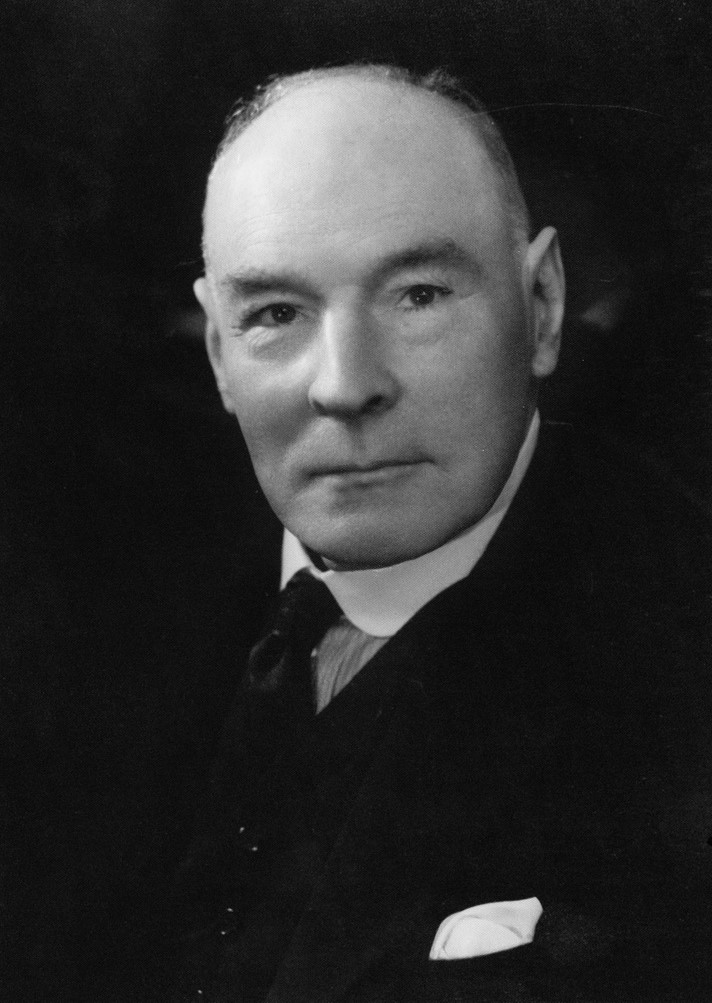
- Sir Walter James Young
- Born: April 2, 1872; Moonta, South Australia
- Died: January 5, 1940 (aged 67)
- Occupation: Businessman
- Employer(s): Elder Smith and Company
- Known for: Commonwealth shipping board, Australian wool and wheat negotiations
- Honors: CBE (1918), KBE (1932)

Sir Walter James Young KBE (2 April 1872 – 5 January 1940) was an Australian businessman.

== See also ==
- Frederick William Young
- Richard Layton Butler
- Lionel Laughton Hill
