= William Mitchell Banks =

Scottish surgeon

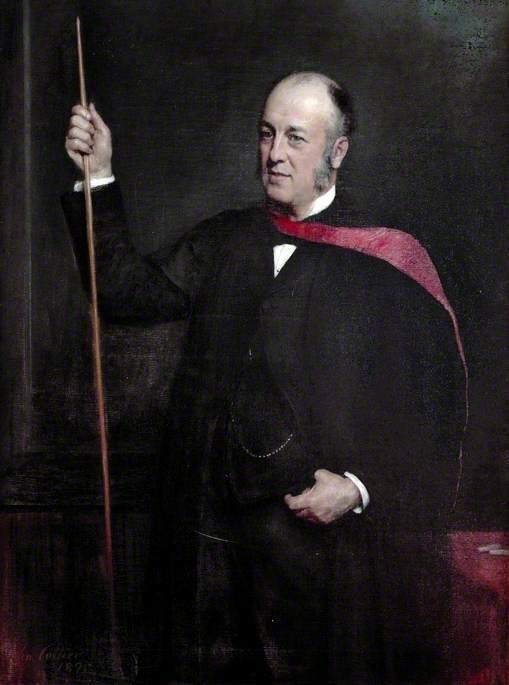
- Sir William Mitchell Banks
- Born: 1 November 1842; Edinburgh, Scotland
- Died: 9 August 1904 (aged 61); Karlsbad Hotel, Aachen, Germany
- Occupations: Medical doctor, surgeon

Sir William Mitchell Banks FRCS (1 November 1842 – 9 August 1904) was a Scottish surgeon. He was an early advocate of what is now called the modified radical mastectomy.

== Life ==
Banks was born in Edinburgh, the son of Ann Williamson and Peter Spalding Banks. He received his MD in 1864 at the University of Edinburgh. He took up a post at the Infirmary School of Medicine, Liverpool, and was surgeon of the Liverpool Royal Infirmary from 1877 to 1902, when he resigned and was appointed Consulting Surgeon. He died on 9 August 1904, while travelling, in Aix-la-Chapelle. He is buried in Toxteth Park Cemetery in Liverpool.

== Work ==
"Mitchell Banks deserves recognition both as a surgeon and as an organizer. The modern operation for removal of the cancerous breast is largely due to his practice and advocacy. He recommended, in the face of strenuous opposition, an extensive operation that should include removal of the axillary glands when most surgeons were contented with local amputation. He drew attention to his method in 1878 and made it the topic of the Lettsomian Lectures at the Medical Society of London in 1900."

Banks describes his operation in the following manner, "Now having cleared out the axilla forty-one times, I have naturally come to know something about the state of the glands; and the first point was recognized of the fact that, until we have these glands in our hand and have split them open with a knife, we cannot tell whether they are infected or not. The usual fumbling in the axilla which is practised by surgeons tells nothing. When the glands are a big as walnuts, any first year's student, can tell they are infected; but there is a stage -the earlier stage- when there are certainly affected, and yet to touch through layers of skin fat, nothing amiss, can be felt. As a result of this, I came to the conclusion, about three years ago, that in every case where the breast is removed, the axilla should be cleared out as a necessary accomplainment; and this I beg to urge upon the meeting, The one operation is useless without the other. As you cannot tell whether the glands are infected or not, remove them and dissipate the doubt."

== Family ==
He was the father of Conservative Member of Parliament and County Court judge Sir Reginald Mitchell Banks.
