= 1969 Swindon by-election =

UK Parliamentary by-election

The 1969 Swindon by-election of 30 October 1969 was held after Labour Member of Parliament (MP) Francis Noel-Baker resigned from the House of Commons. The seat was won by the Conservative Party in a defeat for Harold Wilson's government.

== Background ==
To defend the seat they had won with a majority of over 10,000 votes at the 1966 general election Labour chose David Stoddart, a member of Reading Borough Council since 1954 and leader of the Labour Party group on that council since 1962. He had previously stood as the Labour candidate for Newbury in the 1959 and 1964 general elections. The Conservatives, who had come second at the last election, chose Christopher Ward, a solicitor and member of Berkshire County Council.

== Result ==
Swindon by-election, 1969
| Party | Candidate | Votes | % | ±% |
|---|---|---|---|---|
| Conservative | Christopher Ward | 16,843 | 41.73 | +5.06 |
| Labour | David Stoddart | 16,365 | 40.54 | −20.81 |
| Liberal | Christopher Layton | 6,193 | 15.34 | New |
| Communist | Judith Gradwell | 518 | 1.28 | −0.70 |
| Young Socialist | Frank Willis | 446 | 1.10 | New |
| Majority | | 478 | 1.19 | N/A |
| Turnout | | 40,365 | | |
| Conservative gain from Labour | | Swing | +12.9 | |

== Previous result ==
General election 1966: Swindon
| Party | Candidate | Votes | % | ±% |
|---|---|---|---|---|
| Labour | Francis Noel-Baker | 25,966 | 61.35 | |
| Conservative | NG Reece | 15,523 | 36.67 | |
| Communist | I Gradwell | 838 | 1.98 | |
| Majority | | 10,443 | 24.68 | |
| Turnout | | 42,357 | 73.51 | |
| Labour hold | | Swing | | |

== Aftermath ==
This was one of five by-elections held on the same day where Labour were trying to retain a seat that they held. While they held the other four seats, with the exception of Glasgow Gorbals, none of them was a comfortable hold, with Labour's majorities being significantly reduced by the Conservatives. The swing to the Conservatives in Swindon was 12.9%, which was much more than the 4% swing the Conservatives required if they were to win the next general election. This was the 14th seat that Labour had lost in a by-election since the 1966 general election.

A report in the following day's The Glasgow Herald argued the Liberal Party's "big challenge" in Swindon "possibly contributed to Labour's defeat", but also blamed "the Government's neglect of the constituency, having left it vacant since February."

At the following year's general election, Stoddart stood again as Labour's candidate and this time defeated Ward with a majority of 5,576 votes.
