= Swindon (constituency) =

Former parliamentary constituency (1918-1997)

- Former borough constituency for the House of Commons
- County: Wiltshire

1918–1997
- Seats: One
- Created from: Cricklade
- Replaced by: Swindon South, Swindon North

Swindon was a parliamentary constituency in the town of Swindon in Wiltshire, England.

It returned one Member of Parliament (MP) to the House of Commons of the Parliament of the United Kingdom from the 1918 general election until it was abolished for the 1997 general election.

It was then replaced by the two new constituencies of North Swindon and Swindon South.

== History ==
Swindon was a predominantly Conservative seat in its early history, though Labour first won the seat in 1929 and gained the seat in a 1934 by-election before losing it to the Conservatives in the general election the following year.

From 1945 until 1983 however, Swindon became a increasingly safe seat for the Labour Party, one of the party's few electoral strongholds in Southern England, being one of the most important historic railway towns in the country regarding the production and manufacture related to the industry. In the 1840s a greenfield site near the market town was transformed by the Great Western Railway (GWR) with its large works factory. The scale of the GWR's influence on Swindon reached its peak in the second quarter of the 20th century, though production gradually wound down, the works closing in 1986.

Swindon diversified its local economy, known for being a regional centre for business, and home to many technological and pharmaceutical companies, becoming more reliant on the service sector, gradually swinging more towards the Conservative Party in the 1980s.

The Conservatives gained the seat in 1983 in their landslide victory, and held the seat until 1997 when Swindon was divided into two constituencies (Swindon North, Swindon South), which were both gained by Labour in the general election of that year.

== Boundaries ==
1918–1950: The Borough of Swindon, and the part of the Rural District of Highworth which was not included in the Devizes constituency.

1950–1983: The Borough of Swindon.

1983–1997: The Borough of Thamesdown wards of Central, Dorcan, Eastcott, Gorse Hill, Lawns, Moredon, Park, Toothill, Walcot, Western, and Whitworth.

== Members of Parliament ==
Election	Member	Party
1918	Sir Frederick William Young	Coalition Conservative
1922	Sir Reginald Mitchell Banks	Conservative
1929	Christopher Addison	Labour
1931	Sir Reginald Mitchell Banks	Conservative
1934 by-election	Christopher Addison	Labour
1935	Wavell Wakefield	Conservative
1945	Thomas Reid	Labour
1955	Francis Noel-Baker	Labour
1969 by-election	Christopher Ward	Conservative
1970	David Stoddart	Labour
1983	Simon Coombs	Conservative
1997	constituency abolished: see Swindon South and Swindon North	

== Elections ==
=== Election in the 1910s ===
General election 1918: Swindon
Party		Candidate	Votes	%	±%
C	Unionist	Frederick William Young	10,180	48.4	
	Labour	Joseph Compton	8,393	39.9	
	Liberal	Harry Walker	2,460	11.7	
Majority			1,787	8.5	
Turnout			21,033	67.0	
Registered electors			31,406		
	Unionist win (new seat)				
C indicates candidate endorsed by the coalition government.

=== Elections in the 1920s ===
General election 1922: Swindon
Party	Candidate	Votes	%	±%
Unionist	Reginald Mitchell Banks	14,886	56.4	+8.0
Labour	Joseph Compton	11,502	43.6	+3.7
Majority		3,384	12.8	+4.3
Turnout		26,388	80.0	+13.0
Registered electors		33,000		
Unionist hold		Swing	+2.2	

General election 1923: Swindon
Party	Candidate	Votes	%	±%
Unionist	Reginald Mitchell Banks	12,625	45.1	−11.3
Labour	Holford Knight	9,121	32.6	−11.0
Liberal	Walter Leslie Rocke	6,231	22.3	New
Majority		3,504	12.5	−0.3
Turnout		27,977	82.8	+0.8
Registered electors		33,787		
Unionist hold		Swing	−0.2	

General election 1924: Swindon
Party	Candidate	Votes	%	±%
Unionist	Reginald Mitchell Banks	15,602	55.1	+10.0
Labour	R. H. Tawney	12,698	44.9	+12.3
Majority		2,904	10.2	−2.3
Turnout		28,300	81.0	−1.8
Registered electors		34,938		
Unionist hold		Swing	−1.2	

General election 1929: Swindon
Party	Candidate	Votes	%	±%
Labour	Christopher Addison	16,885	43.6	−1.3
Unionist	Reginald Mitchell Banks	14,724	38.1	−17.0
Liberal	Frank Crane Thornborough	7,060	18.3	New
Majority		2,161	5.5	N/A
Turnout		38,669	85.5	+4.5
Registered electors		45,250		
Labour gain from Unionist		Swing	+7.9	

=== Elections in the 1930s ===
General election 1931: Swindon
Party	Candidate	Votes	%	±%
Conservative	Reginald Mitchell Banks	22,756	55.89	
Labour	Christopher Addison	17,962	44.11	
Majority		4,794	11.78	N/A
Turnout		40,718	85.53	
Conservative gain from Labour		Swing		

1934 Swindon by-election
Party	Candidate	Votes	%	±%
Labour	Christopher Addison	20,902	53.4	+8.3
Conservative	Wavell Wakefield	18,253	46.6	−8.3
Majority		2,649	6.8	N/A
Turnout		39,155	81.8	−3.7
Labour gain from Conservative		Swing		

General election 1935: Swindon
Party	Candidate	Votes	%	±%
Conservative	Wavell Wakefield	20,732	51.20	
Labour	Christopher Addison	19,757	48.80	
Majority		975	2.40	
Turnout		40,489	84.26	
Conservative hold		Swing		

=== Elections in the 1940s ===
General election 1945: Swindon
Party	Candidate	Votes	%	±%
Labour	Thomas Reid	27,545	62.34	
Conservative	AM Gibb	16,641	37.66	
Majority		10,904	24.68	N/A
Turnout		44,186	73.90	
Labour gain from Conservative		Swing		

=== Elections in the 1950s ===
General election 1950: Swindon
Party	Candidate	Votes	%	±%
Labour	Thomas Reid	21,976	51.47	
Conservative	Geoffrey Tritton	13,697	32.08	
Liberal	Doreen Gorsky	6,726	15.75	New
Communist	Irving Gradwell	295	0.69	New
Majority		8,279	19.39	
Turnout		42,694	87.19	
Labour hold		Swing		

General election 1951: Swindon
Party	Candidate	Votes	%	±%
Labour	Thomas Reid	23,980	57.02	
Conservative	Geoffrey Tritton	18,072	42.98	
Majority		5,908	14.04	
Turnout		42,052	89.00	
Labour hold		Swing		

General election 1955: Swindon
Party	Candidate	Votes	%	±%
Labour	Francis Noel-Baker	21,926	54.93	
Conservative	Patrick William Medd	17,987	45.07	
Majority		3,939	9.86	
Turnout		39,913	80.02	
Labour hold		Swing		

General election 1959: Swindon
Party	Candidate	Votes	%	±%
Labour	Francis Noel-Baker	24,087	54.42	
Conservative	Gordon L Pears	20,178	45.58	
Majority		3,909	8.84	
Turnout		44.265	79.99	
Labour hold		Swing		

=== Elections in the 1960s ===
General election 1964: Swindon
Party	Candidate	Votes	%	±%
Labour	Francis Noel-Baker	26,464	60.06	
Conservative	Norman George Reece	16,651	37.79	
Communist	Irving Gradwell	944	2.14	New
Majority		9,813	22.27	
Turnout		44,059	74.77	
Labour hold		Swing		

General election 1966: Swindon
Party	Candidate	Votes	%	±%
Labour	Francis Noel-Baker	25,966	61.35	
Conservative	Norman George Reece	15,523	36.67	
Communist	Irving Gradwell	838	1.98	
Majority		10,443	24.68	
Turnout		42,327	73.51	
Labour hold		Swing		

1969 Swindon by-election
Party	Candidate	Votes	%	±%
Conservative	Christopher Ward	16,843	41.73	+5.06
Labour	David Stoddart	16,365	40.54	−20.81
Liberal	Christopher Layton	6,193	15.34	New
Communist	Judith Gradwell	518	1.28	−0.70
Young Socialist	Frank Willis	446	1.10	New
Majority		478	1.19	N/A
Turnout		40,365		
Conservative gain from Labour		Swing	+12.9	

=== Elections in the 1970s ===
General election 1970: Swindon
Party	Candidate	Votes	%	±%
Labour	David Stoddart	25,731	55.52	−5.83
Conservative	Christopher Ward	20,155	43.49	+6.82
Communist	Judith Gradwell	456	0.98	−1.00
Majority		5,576	12.03	−12.64
Turnout		46,342	75.49	
Labour hold		Swing		

General election February 1974: Swindon
Party	Candidate	Votes	%	±%
Labour	David Stoddart	24,093	47.92	
Conservative	GCM Young	15,384	30.60	
Liberal	R Hubbard	10,564	21.01	New
Workers Revolutionary	K Blakeney	240	0.48	New
Majority		8,709	17.32	
Turnout		50,281	80.89	
Labour hold		Swing		

General election October 1974: Swindon
Party	Candidate	Votes	%	±%
Labour	David Stoddart	24,124	51.84	
Conservative	JN Gripper	13,854	29.77	
Liberal	R Hubbard	8,349	17.94	
Workers Revolutionary	K Blakeney	206	0.44	
Majority		10,270	22.07	
Turnout		46,533	73.98	
Labour hold		Swing		

General election 1979: Swindon
Party	Candidate	Votes	%	±%
Labour	David Stoddart	25,218	50.19	
Conservative	N Hammond	19,319	38.45	
Liberal	Gudrun Claire Ziegler Collis	5,709	11.36	
Majority		5,899	11.74	
Turnout		50,346	76.41	
Labour hold		Swing		

=== Elections in the 1980s ===
General election 1983: Swindon
Party	Candidate	Votes	%	±%
Conservative	Simon Coombs	22,310	39.16	
Labour	David Stoddart	20,915	36.71	
SDP	Derek J Scott	13,743	24.12	
Majority		1,395	2.45	N/A
Turnout		56,968	74.15	
Conservative gain from Labour		Swing		

General election 1987: Swindon
Party	Candidate	Votes	%	±%
Conservative	Simon Coombs	29,385	43.84	
Labour	Jean Gabrielle Johnston	24,528	36.59	
SDP	Derek John Scott	13,114	19.57	
Majority		4,857	7.25	
Turnout		67,027	77.80	
Conservative hold		Swing		

=== Elections in the 1990s ===
General election 1992: Swindon
Party	Candidate	Votes	%	±%
Conservative	Simon Coombs	31,749	43.3	−0.5
Labour	JP D’Avila	28,923	39.4	+2.8
Liberal Democrats	SR Cordon	11,737	16.0	−3.6
Green	JV Hughes	647	0.9	New
Raving Loony Green Giant	CR Gillard	236	0.3	New
Independent	VF Farrar	78	0.1	New
Majority		2,826	3.9	−3.3
Turnout		73,370	81.5	+3.7
Conservative hold		Swing	−1.7	

== See also ==
- List of parliamentary constituencies in Wiltshire
