= Frederick William Young =

Australian politician

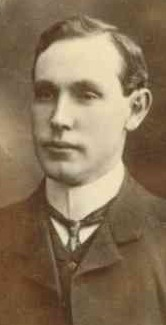
Photo taken 1902

Sir Frederick William Young (5 January 1876 – 26 August 1948) was an Australian agent-general, barrister, liberal/conservative politician and member of the South Australian House of Assembly.

Young was born in Blyth, South Australia and represented Stanley in the House of Assembly from 3 May 1902 to 26 May 1905. He later represented Wooroora from 13 February 1909 to 26 March 1915. From 17 February 1912 until 19 November 1914, Young was Commissioner of Crown Lands and Immigration for South Australia.

He married Florence, daughter of John Darling Jr. (1852–1914).

In 1918 he was elected Conservative Member of Parliament for Swindon in the United Kingdom Parliament. He stood down at the 1922 election. He was knighted in 1918.

Young died in Buckingham Gate, London, England.

== See also ==
- Walter James Young
- Randolph Isham Stow
- John Darling Sr.
- Archibald Peake

Parliament of the United Kingdom
New constituency	Member of Parliament for Swindon; 1918 – 1922	Succeeded by Reginald Mitchell Banks

Diplomatic posts
Preceded by Andrew Kirkpatrick	Agent-General for South Australia; 1915–1918	Succeeded by Edward Lucas
