= Michael Wills =

British Labour politician

The Right Honourable The Lord Wills PC
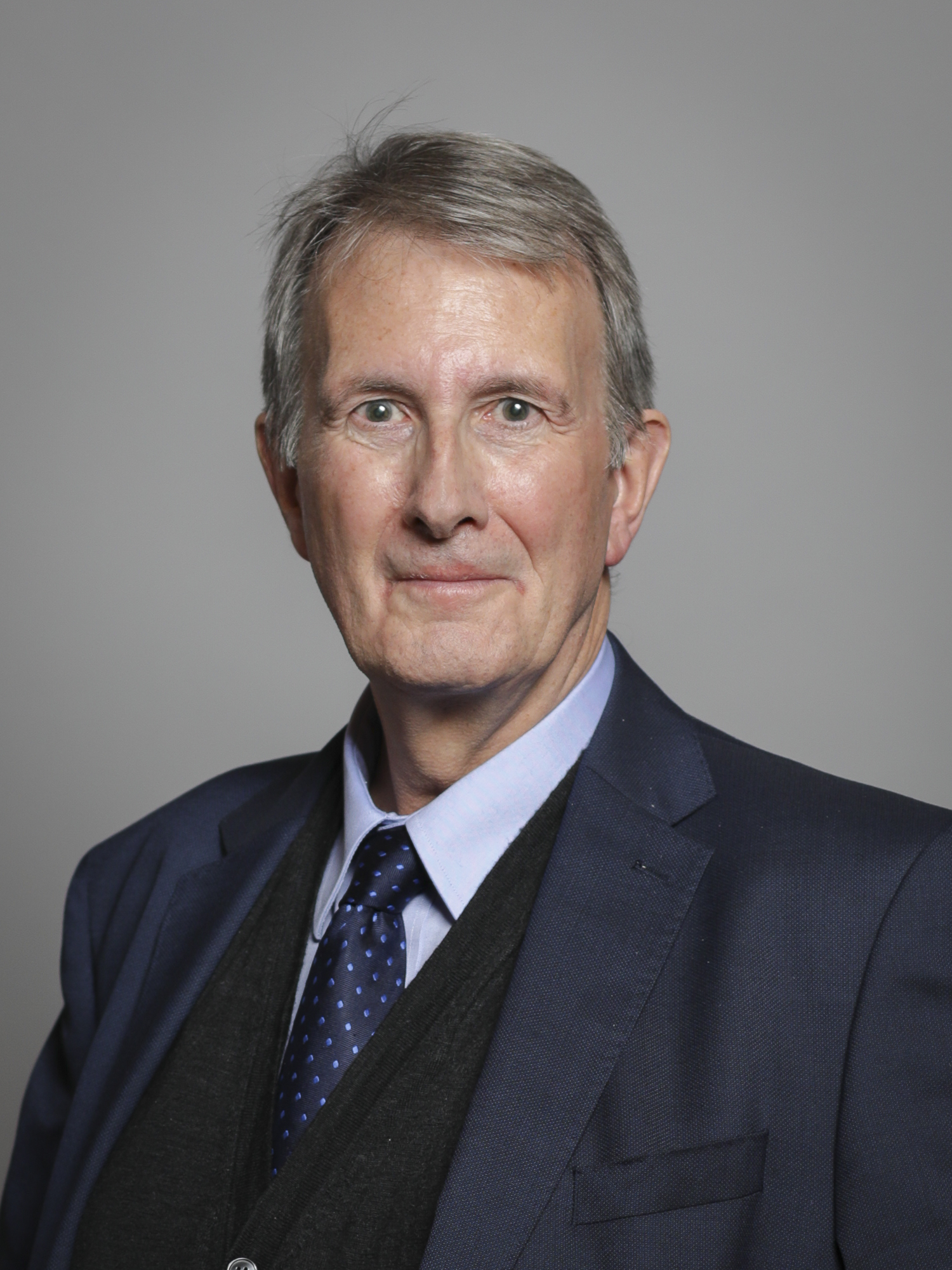
- Official portrait, 2019

Minister of State for Justice
- In office 29 June 2007 – 6 May 2010
- Prime Minister: Gordon Brown
- Preceded by: Harriet Harman
- Succeeded by: The Lord McNally

Parliamentary Under-Secretary to the Lord Chancellor's Department
- In office 11 June 2001 – 28 May 2002 Serving with Patricia Scotland and Rosie Winterton
- Prime Minister: Tony Blair
- Preceded by: Jane Kennedy
- Succeeded by: Yvette Cooper

Member of the House of Lords
- Lord Temporal
- Life peerage 10 July 2010

Member of Parliament for North Swindon
- In office 1 May 1997 – 12 April 2010
- Preceded by: Constituency established
- Succeeded by: Justin Tomlinson

Personal details
- Born: 20 May 1952 (age 74) London, England
- Party: Labour
- Spouse: Jill Freeman
- Education: Clare College, Cambridge

Michael David Wills, Baron Wills PC (born 20 May 1952) is a British politician and life peer who served as Minister of State for Justice from 2007 to 2010. A member of the Labour Party, he was Member of Parliament (MP) for Swindon North from 1997 to 2010.

== Early life ==
Wills was born in 1952 to Stephen Wills and his wife Elizabeth (née McKeowen). He has a younger sister. He went to the independent Haberdashers' Boys' School in Elstree, Hertfordshire and studied at Clare College, Cambridge, where he graduated with a double first in History (BA). Following that, he joined the diplomatic service, gaining the highest mark in the entrance exam.

He worked for HM Diplomatic Service from 1976 to 1980. He became a researcher for London Weekend Television from 1980 to 1984, being a colleague of Peter Mandelson. From 1984 to 1997, he was a Director of Juniper Productions.

== Political career ==
He was elected as the MP for Swindon North in 1997 and quickly joined the government, working in various capacities. He eventually left the government to campaign against the Common Agricultural Policy. This campaign appears to have subsided. He was re-elected as an MP in 2001 and 2005. He has worked as an advisor and speechwriter to Gordon Brown. It was announced he would be appointed to the Privy Council in October 2008.

On 14 September 2009, Wills announced his intention to stand down at the 2010 general election. In the 2010 Dissolution Honours, he was awarded a life peerage, which was created on 10 July 2010 with the title Baron Wills, of North Swindon, in the County of Wiltshire.

== Voting record ==
How Michael Wills voted on key issues since 2001:

- Voted for introducing a smoking ban.
- Voted for introducing ID cards.
- Voted for introducing foundation hospitals.
- Voted for introducing student top-up fees.
- Voted for Labour's anti-terrorism laws.
- Voted for the Iraq war.
- Voted against investigating the Iraq war.
- Voted for replacing Trident.
- Voted for the hunting ban.
- Voted for equal gay rights.

== Personal life ==
He married Jill Freeman on 19 January 1984 in Westminster. They have three sons and two daughters.

== Literary career ==
Michael Wills published two crime novels under the pen name David McKeowen (using his mother's birth name):

- Grip (2005) ISBN 0340752335 OCLC 439458105
- Trapped (2007) ISBN 0340835966 OCLC 271562089

Parliament of the United Kingdom
New constituency	Member of Parliament for Swindon North; 1997–2010	Succeeded by Justin Tomlinson
Orders of precedence in the United Kingdom
Preceded by The Lord Black of Brentwood	Gentlemen; Baron Wills	Followed by The Lord Popat
