= Christopher Ward (British politician) =

British politician (born 1942)

Christopher John Ferguson Ward (born 26 December 1942) is a British solicitor and Conservative Party politician, who served as a Member of Parliament (MP) for only seven months after winning a by-election. His attempts to be selected for a safe seat were thwarted, and when he found a winnable marginal seat, he found his vote split by an unofficial Conservative candidate.

== Education ==
Ward was educated at Magdalen College School in Oxford, and then at the Law Society School of Law; He was admitted to the roll of solicitors in January 1965, and employed as a solicitor in Reading.

== Political career ==
=== County councillor ===
Ward was already committed to the Conservative Party and was elected Chairman of the Young Conservatives in the Wessex area. In 1965 Ward began his political career when he was elected to Berkshire County Council. He became chairman of the Road Safety committee and in February 1969 he condemned the state of the A4 between Reading and Hungerford as a "killer road", after 38 people were killed on the road in the space of eighteen months.

=== By-election campaign ===
When Labour MP Francis Noel-Baker resigned from the House of Commons in 1969, Ward was selected as the Conservative candidate in the resulting by-election. Ward noted that the large number of candidates (the Liberal Party, Communist Party of Great Britain and a "Young Socialist" candidate stood) could help him win if disenchanted Labour voters stayed at home. After a recount, Ward won with a majority of 478, overturning Noel-Baker's majority of over 10,000 at the 1966 general election; his victory speech was received with hostility by a Labour-supporting crowd.

=== Parliament ===
Ward made his maiden speech in a debate on capital punishment in December 1969, declaring that he wanted to vote for abolition of the death penalty with a clear conscience but that there was inadequate evidence that it was safe to do so. In January 1970 he initiated a debate on housebuilding, insisting that half a million houses needed to be built every year in order to solve the housing problem; he called on the Labour government to apologise for failing to meet that target.

=== Defeat ===
At the general election in June 1970, Ward tried to attract attention by campaigning on a horse and cart. However, he could not prevent the Labour candidate David Stoddart retaking the seat with a majority of 5,576.

=== Selections ===
Ward began to look around for a winnable constituency to fight, and was considered for the Arundel and Shoreham constituency in a 1971 byelection. In 1972 he was shortlisted for Mid Oxon, losing out to Douglas Hurd, and for Kingston-upon-Thames, losing out to Norman Lamont; he was perceived as being on the left of the Conservative Party. He was also edged out at Christchurch and Lymington by Robert Adley, at Beaconsfield by Ronald Bell, and at Hove by Tim Sainsbury. Ward was ultimately not selected anywhere in the February and October 1974 general elections.

== Eton and Slough candidate ==
Ward had stood down from Berkshire County Council in 1970, but returned to it in 1974; he served as Deputy Leader and chair of the Finance sub-committee. He was also a member of the South East Regional Planning Council. He had better luck with Parliamentary selections in 1976 when he was chosen as Conservative candidate for Eton and Slough. At the 1976 Conservative Party conference, Ward opened the discussion on "People, Parliament and the Constitution", arguing that Britain was no longer a truly free society because the Labour government wanted a state-controlled society.

At the 1979 general election, Ward faced an additional challenge when a rebel local Conservative councillor who had recently served as Mayor was nominated as an unofficial candidate. Ward ended up losing the election by 1,340 votes, with the unofficial candidate taking 2,359 votes.

== Later career ==
Later in 1979, Ward became Leader of Berkshire County Council (Chairman of the Policy Committee); he served until 1981 when the Conservatives lost control. He was a Governor of Chiltern Nursery Training College from 1975 to 1997, serving as Chairman in 1988–91; he also served London Conservative clubland as honorary Secretary of the United and Cecil Club from 1982 to 1987, and became club Treasurer in 1993.

== See also ==
- List of United Kingdom MPs with the shortest service

Parliament of the United Kingdom
Preceded by Francis Noel-Baker	Member of Parliament for Swindon; 1969–1970	Succeeded by David Stoddart
