= Justin Tomlinson =

British politician (born 1976)

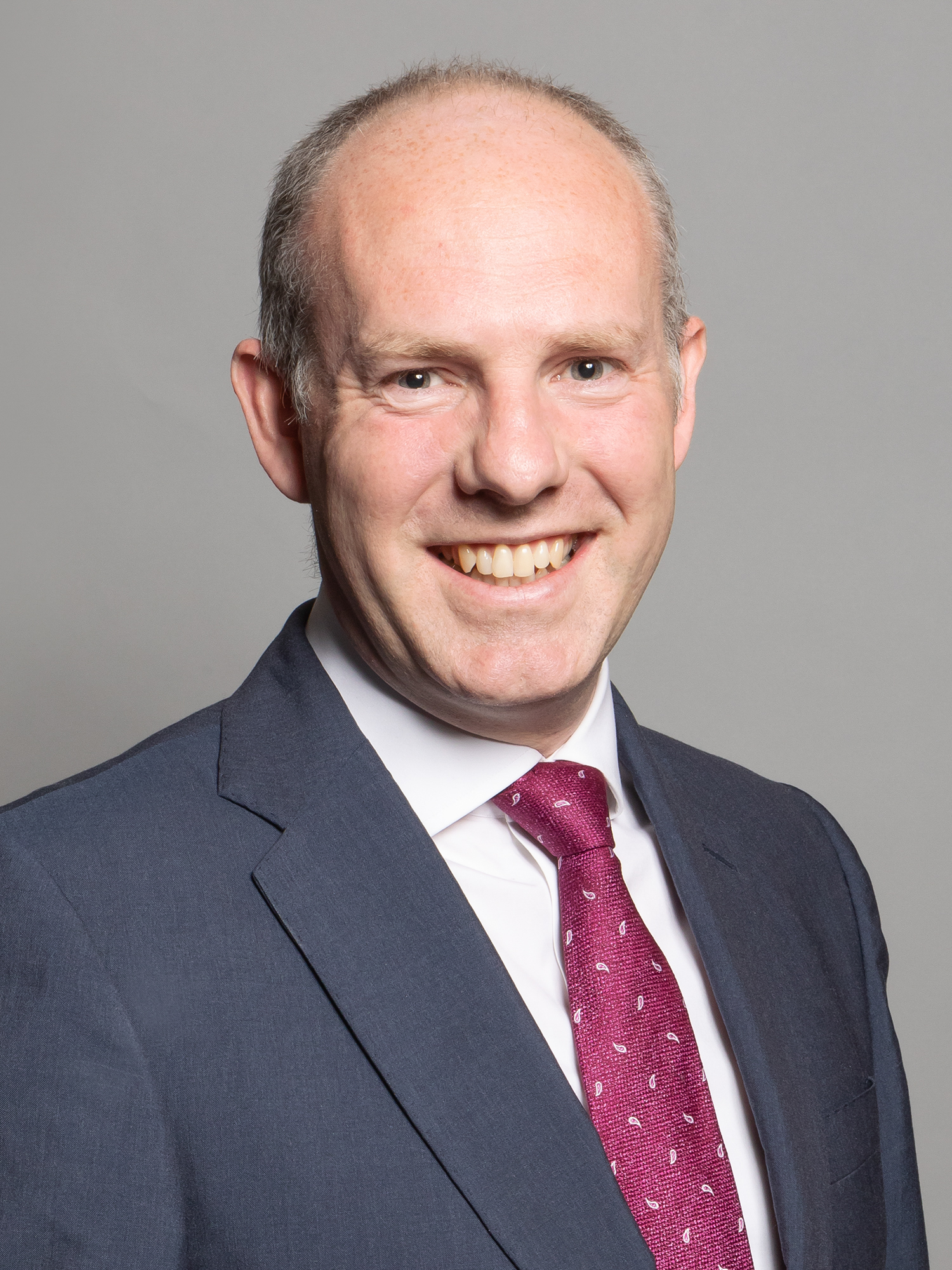
- Official portrait, 2020

Minister of State for Energy Security and Net Zero
- In office 12 April 2024 – 5 July 2024
- Prime Minister: Rishi Sunak
- Preceded by: Graham Stuart
- Succeeded by: The Lord Hunt of Kings Heath

Deputy Chairman of the Conservative Party
- In office 16 September 2021 – 9 July 2022
- Leader: Boris Johnson
- Preceded by: Lee Rowley
- Succeeded by: Matt Vickers

Minister of State for Disabled People, Work and Health (Note: Parliamentary Under-Secretary of State for Disabled People (2015–16))
- In office 4 April 2019 – 16 September 2021
- Prime Minister: Theresa May; Boris Johnson
- Preceded by: Sarah Newton
- Succeeded by: Chloe Smith
- In office 8 May 2015 – 15 July 2016
- Prime Minister: David Cameron
- Preceded by: Mark Harper
- Succeeded by: Penny Mordaunt

Parliamentary Under-Secretary of State for Family Support, Housing and Child Maintenance
- In office 9 July 2018 – 4 April 2019
- Prime Minister: Theresa May
- Preceded by: Kit Malthouse
- Succeeded by: Will Quince

Member of Parliament for North Swindon
- In office 6 May 2010 – 30 May 2024
- Preceded by: Michael Wills
- Succeeded by: Will Stone

Personal details
- Born: 5 November 1976 (age 49) Blackburn, England
- Party: Conservative
- Spouses: Joanne Wheeler (m. 2012; div. 2016) Kate Bennett (m. 2018)
- Children: 2
- Education: Oxford Brookes
- Website: www.justintomlinson.com

Justin Paul Tomlinson (born 5 November 1976) is a British politician and former marketing executive who served as Minister of State for Energy Security and Net Zero in 2024. A member of the Conservative Party, he was the Member of Parliament (MP) for North Swindon from 2010 to 2024.

A former councillor on Swindon Borough Council, Tomlinson previously served as Parliamentary Private Secretary to Ed Vaizey. He served in Prime Minister David Cameron's government as Parliamentary Under-Secretary of State for Disabled People from 2015 to 2016. He was a junior minister during the second May ministry at the Department for Work and Pensions, as Parliamentary Under-Secretary for Family Support, Housing and Child Maintenance from 2018 to 2019. He later served as Minister of State for Disabled People, Work and Health from 2019 to 2021.

== Early life and career ==
Justin Tomlinson was born in Blackburn on 5 November 1976. His mother Vera represented the St. Andrews ward on Swindon Borough Council. He studied at Harry Cheshire High School, a state comprehensive in Kidderminster, before going to Oxford Brookes University, where he was chairman of its Conservative Student Branch from 1995 to 1999. He was national chairman of Conservative Future, the youth-wing of the Conservative Party, between 2002 and 2003.

Tomlinson worked as the manager of a nightclub called Eros in Swindon, and later owned a marketing business.

Tomlinson was elected as the Conservative Party candidate for Abbey Meads ward of Swindon Borough Council in 2000, then re-elected for the same ward in 2002 and 2006.

== Parliamentary career ==
Tomlinson stood as the Conservative candidate in North Swindon at the 2005 general election, coming second with 38% of the vote behind the incumbent Labour MP Michael Wills.

At the 2010 general election, Tomlinson was elected to Parliament as MP for North Swindon with 44.6% of the vote and a majority of 7,060.

Along with fellow Conservative MP Chris Kelly, Tomlinson placed a bet while at university that he would be prime minister before the year 2038. He stands to win £500,000 should this happen.

In November 2014, he reported the Labour MP Sadiq Khan to the police after Khan was photographed apparently driving whilst using a mobile phone. Tomlinson said "those who make the laws should certainly not be above them". Khan was not prosecuted.

At the 2015 general election, Tomlinson was re-elected as MP for North Swindon with an increased vote share of 50.3% and an increased majority of 11,786.

He was appointed Parliamentary Under Secretary of State for Disabled People following the general election, serving until the new prime minister, Theresa May, reshuffled the government in 2016. It was reported by The Huffington Post that his appointment was controversial as he had previously voted against protecting the benefits of disabled children and those undergoing cancer treatment.

Tomlinson voted for the UK to leave the European Union in the 2016 referendum.

In September 2016, Tomlinson apologised for leaking a draft of a public accounts committee report on the credit industry to someone he knew who worked for payday lender Wonga. He was suspended from the House of Commons for two days for contempt of Parliament.

At the snap 2017 general election, Tomlinson was again re-elected, with an increased vote share of 53.6% and a decreased majority of 8,335.

On 9 July 2018, Tomlinson was appointed as a junior minister in the Department for Work and Pensions as Parliamentary Under-Secretary for Family Support, Housing and Child Maintenance.

In November 2018, Tomlinson was criticised by Labour MP Ruth George after appearing to suggest that families facing a cap under the Universal Credit scheme could take in a lodger. A Department for Work and Pensions spokesperson later said that Tomlinson was giving "illustrative examples of how some households subject to the cap may have supplemented income" and denied that Tomlinson said households under the cap could or should consider taking a lodger. Tomlinson was Parliamentary Under-Secretary (junior government minister) for Family Support, Housing and Child Maintenance within the Department for Work and Pensions (DWP).

At the 2019 general election, Tomlinson was again re-elected, with an increased vote share of 59.1% and an increased majority of 16,171.

Tomlinson left government during the cabinet reshuffle on 16 September 2021 and returned to the backbenches.

Tomlinson was appointed Deputy Chairman of the Conservative Party on 16 September 2021. He resigned from this position on 9 July 2022 in order to support Kemi Badenoch's campaign in the July 2022 Conservative Party leadership election.

In February 2022 Tomlinson was accused of bullying and sending inappropriate "unprofessional" and "belittling" messages to employees at Conservative Campaign Headquarters.

At the 2024 general election, Tomlinson was defeated by the Labour candidate Will Stone, attaining 13,827 votes or 31.3% of the vote.

== Post-parliamentary career ==
Following his defeat at the 2024 UK General Election, Tomlinson launched Conservative Print and Justin Tomlinson Ltd, which provides design, marketing and print services for Conservative MPs, candidates and councillors.

== Personal life ==
Tomlinson announced his engagement to Jo Wheeler in August 2011, having proposed on The Peak, the highest point on Hong Kong Island. The couple married at the House of Commons on 2 June 2012. In July 2016, Tomlinson confirmed that he had divorced his wife and was in a relationship with his office manager, Kate Bennett. They married in October 2018 and have one daughter, born in August 2019.

Tomlinson employs his partner as Office Manager on a salary up to £40,000. The practice of MPs employing family members, has been criticised by some sections of the media on the lines that it promotes nepotism. Although MPs who were first elected in 2017 have been banned from employing family members, the restriction is not retrospective – meaning that Tomlinson's employment of his partner is lawful.

== Notes ==
Parliament of the United Kingdom
Preceded by Michael Wills	Member of Parliament for North Swindon; 2010–2024	Succeeded by Will Stone
