= Simon Coombs =

British politician

Member of Parliament for Swindon
- In office 9 June 1983 – 1 May 1997
- Preceded by: David Stoddart
- Succeeded by: Constituency abolished

Personal details
- Born: 21 February 1947 (age 78)
- Party: Conservative

Simon Christopher Coombs (born 21 February 1947), is a former British Conservative politician.

Coombs was MP for Swindon from 1983 until 1997 when the seat was divided by boundary changes. Coombs stood in the new Swindon South seat but lost to Labour's Julia Drown. He stood again for the seat in 2001, but was unsuccessful.

== Early life ==
Coombs was educated at Wycliffe College in Gloucestershire and Reading University, where he graduated BA and MPhil. He then worked for British Telecom from 1970 to 1983, first as a marketing executive and then as a marketing manager for the company's Telex network. He was a Conservative member of Reading Borough Council from 1969 to 1984, becoming deputy leader of the Council in 1976 and chief whip of the Conservative group in 1983.

== Parliamentary career ==
Coombs was elected MP for Swindon in 1983, defeating the sitting Labour MP, David Stoddart, by 1,395 votes in what was then a key marginal. His Parliamentary term coincided with Swindon being the centre of a technology boom. Sir Tim Berners Lee developed the idea of the World Wide Web while at the Science and Engineering Research Council (SERC) in Swindon. Coombs served as Treasurer of PITCOM, the Parliamentary Information Technology Committee and as Parliamentary Private Secretary (PPS) to Rt. Hon Kenneth Baker, MP, Minister of Information Technology in the Department of Trade and Industry, and as PPS to Baker during his 1984–85 term as Minister for the Environment. He later served as PPS to Rt. Hon Ian Lang, MP during his terms as Secretary of State for Scotland (1992–95) and President of the Board of Trade (1995–97). Coombs also served as Parliamentary advisor to the UK Cable Television Association, representing at the time the constituency with the highest cable penetration in the country. He was also Chairman of the Conservative Backbench Tourism Committee and a member of the British Recording Industry Association's All-Party Parliamentary Group and the Select Committee on Employment.

== After the Commons ==
Since leaving Parliament, he has kept active in the music sphere as a trustee of the Ralph Vaughan Williams Society and organizer of the Vaughan Williams exhibition in the composer's home village of Down Ampney.

== Bibliography ==
- Times Guide to the House of Commons, Times Newspapers Limited, 1997

Parliament of the United Kingdom
Preceded by David Stoddart	Member of Parliament for Swindon; 1983–1997	Constituency abolished
