= Francis Noel-Baker =

British politician (1920–2009)

The Honourable Francis Noel-Baker MP
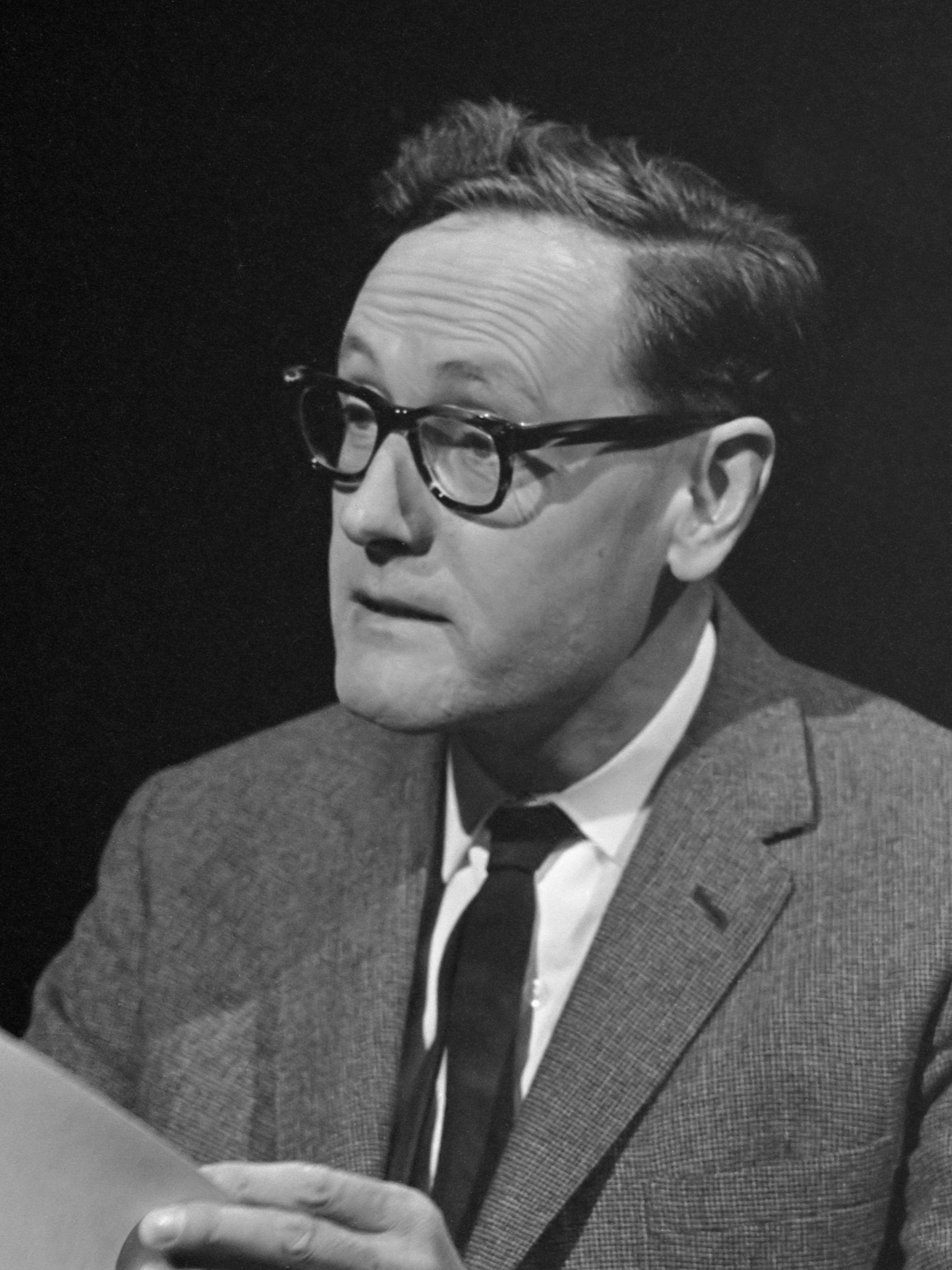

Member of Parliament for Swindon
- In office 26 May 1955 – 7 March 1969
- Preceded by: Thomas Reid
- Succeeded by: Christopher Ward

Member of Parliament for Brentford and Chiswick
- In office 5 July 1945 – 3 February 1950
- Preceded by: Sir Harold Mitchell
- Succeeded by: Percy Lucas

Personal details
- Born: Francis Edward Noel-Baker; 7 January 1920 London, England
- Died: 25 September 2009 (aged 89)
- Party: Labour (until 1971); SDP (1981–83); Conservative (from 1984)
- Spouses: Ann Saunders (m. 1947; div. 1955) Barbara Sonander (m. 1957; died 2004)
- Children: 6
- Parent(s): Philip Noel-Baker; Irene Noel
- Education: Westminster School
- Alma mater: King's College, Cambridge

Francis Edward Noel-Baker (7 January 1920 – 25 September 2009) was a British Labour Party MP. His father was Labour MP and Nobel Peace Prize-winner Philip Noel-Baker.

== Early life ==
Born in London, Noel-Baker was educated at Westminster School and King's College, Cambridge, where he won an exhibition to study history. He was the founding chairman of the Cambridge University Labour Club, which had broken away from the Cambridge University Socialist Club because of the latter's support for pacifism and the Soviet Union. Having spent time as a fighter for the Republican forces in the Spanish Civil War, he nevertheless managed a First in his Prelims, but his studies were interrupted by the outbreak of the Second World War and he never completed his degree.

During the war he served in the Intelligence Corps, and was mentioned in despatches while serving in the Middle East.

== Political career ==
Noel-Baker was first elected to the House of Commons in the Labour landslide at the 1945 general election as Member of Parliament for Brentford and Chiswick. When elected, he was the youngest Labour MP. During his first term in the House he was noted for his interest in international affairs, and in 1948 he acted covertly for the British Government inside Francoist Spain, observing the political conditions there and liaising with underground resistance activists. His report Spanish Summary, with a foreword written by Lady Megan Lloyd George, had a huge influence in shaming the British and other governments and worldwide organisations for allowing Francoist Spain to remain undefeated in Europe until the Spanish transition to democracy.

Though Noel-Baker duly lost his seat in the 1950 general election, he was reelected as MP for Swindon by a small majority at the 1955 election and increased it beyond the 10,000 mark over the two following elections. Vociferous in parliament, diligent in his constituency, and gradually taking charge at the family estate on the large Aegean island of Euboea, he managed – for a time at least – to reconcile socialism in Britain with feudalism, albeit enlightened and benign, in Greece. Fluent in modern Greek, in 1956 he played a semi-official part in the Tory government's dealings with the Greek Cypriot leader Archbishop Makarios and the Enosis independence movement in Cyprus.

While he was an MP Noel-Baker advocated reforms to moderate the influence of outside interests in Parliament. In 1961 he published an article in Parliamentary Affairs warning that "the door, in fact, is wide open for a new form of political corruption, and there is an uneasy feeling in Parliament and outside that its extent could be much greater than the known or published facts reveal".

In 1959 his father won a Nobel Peace Prize, and when Harold Wilson became Labour prime minister in 1964, both father and son were led to expect jobs in the new administration. However, the telephone calls never came. Noel-Baker was "bitterly disappointed at being overlooked."

In April 1967, the democratic west was shocked by a military coup in Greece. The regime established by "the colonels" was widely condemned, but not by Noel-Baker. Although he had supported the previous democratic government, he maintained that the colonels' rule represented reform from political corruption and a way forward for ordinary Greeks. His undisguised support of the new regime made his political life in Britain increasingly precarious, indeed untenable, and in time affected his health. In 1968 he announced his intention not to contest the 1970 election, and retired from parliament in March 1969, taking the Chiltern Hundreds. Two years later, he left the Labour Party in response to the party's opposition to British membership of the European Economic Community (although he was still permitted to take up the role of vice-chairman of the Labour Committee for Europe in 1976). He later joined the Social Democratic Party (SDP), before abandoning it for the Conservative Party in 1984.

== Later years ==
In the years following his retirement from the House, he spent an increasing proportion of his time in Greece, becoming active in a range of Cypriot, environmental and charitable activities. As a lordly host with his wife and family at his beloved Achmetaga, he displayed generosity, humour, and loyalty to friends in all walks of life. Nonetheless, his residence there was not without its dangers: having angered many locals by publicly supporting the military junta, numerous attempts were made throughout the 1970s by the post-dictatorship Greek government to seize his land and have him evicted. Only when Noel-Baker found the title deeds to his estate hidden in his father's air-raid shelter, with signatures supplied by both the Greek and Turkish authorities, did the harassment cease.

Before his death in 2009 Noel-Baker was one of the few surviving members of the 1945 Parliament, the others being Michael Foot and John Freeman. He married Ann Saunders in 1947 (dissolved 1955). In 1957 he married secondly Barbara (or Barbro) Sonander, who died of skin cancer in 2004. Four sons and a daughter from his two marriages survive him, and a son predeceased him.

== Bibliography ==
- Leigh Rayment's Peerage Pages
- "An Isle of Greece: The Noels in Euboea by Barbro Noel-Baker"

Parliament of the United Kingdom
Preceded by Harold Paton Mitchell	Member of Parliament for Brentford and Chiswick; 1945–1950	Succeeded by Percy Lucas
Preceded by Thomas Reid	Member of Parliament for Swindon; 1955–1969	Succeeded by Christopher Ward
