= Thomas Reid (British politician) =

British diplomat and politician

Thomas Reid, CMG (26 December 1881 – 28 January 1963), was a British diplomat and politician. He was Labour Member of Parliament (MP) for Swindon from 1945 to 1955.

== Life ==
Reid was born in Ireland, the son of John Reid of Mount View, County Carlow, and was educated at Queen's College, Cork, and the Royal University of Ireland, where he was a senior classical scholar and prizeman in ancient history.

Upon graduation, he took the entry exams for the Home, Indian and Eastern Civil Service, passing in 1905. He then entered the Ceylon Civil Service, spending the next 26 years there. He was mayor and chairman of the municipal council of Colombo from 1919 to 1924, and a member of the Ceylonese legislature from 1926 to 1931. On his retirement in December 1931 he had been working "on special duty in connection with [the] introduction of [the] new Ceylon Constitution." He was then appointed financial commissioner of the Seychelles in 1933 and chairman of the League of Nations Commission in 1938. In 1934, he published a novel, Where White and Brown Meet.

== Palestine ==
Reid was one of 4 members of the Woodhead Commission (officially the Palestine Partition Commission) of 1938. Reid was known in parliament for his strong views against the division of Palestine under the British Mandate for Palestine. In late 1947, a month after the publication of the United Nations Partition Plan for Palestine, he stated in a long speech to Parliament:

It is an iniquitous scheme, and the chief instigator is a country for whom I have the profoundest love and admiration, next after my own, namely America. I do not believe all the tales about America, about the almighty dollar, and the rest. Americans are a very noble people and have more idealism than most nations of the world. But I have a criticism to make of America on this occasion, or at least of the American delegates to U. N. O. What is the motive? Let us be frank about it. One of the chief motives is that the Jews have a controlling voice in the election for the President in the States of New York, Illinois, Ohio and elsewhere in America. I suggest that the chief reason for this evil proposal of U. N. O. is that the political parties in America, or their party machines, are partly at the electoral mercy of the Jews. That is public knowledge.

Parliament of the United Kingdom
Preceded by Wavell Wakefield	Member of Parliament for Swindon; 1945 – 1955	Succeeded by Francis Noel-Baker
