= Will Stone =

British politician

Will Stone MP
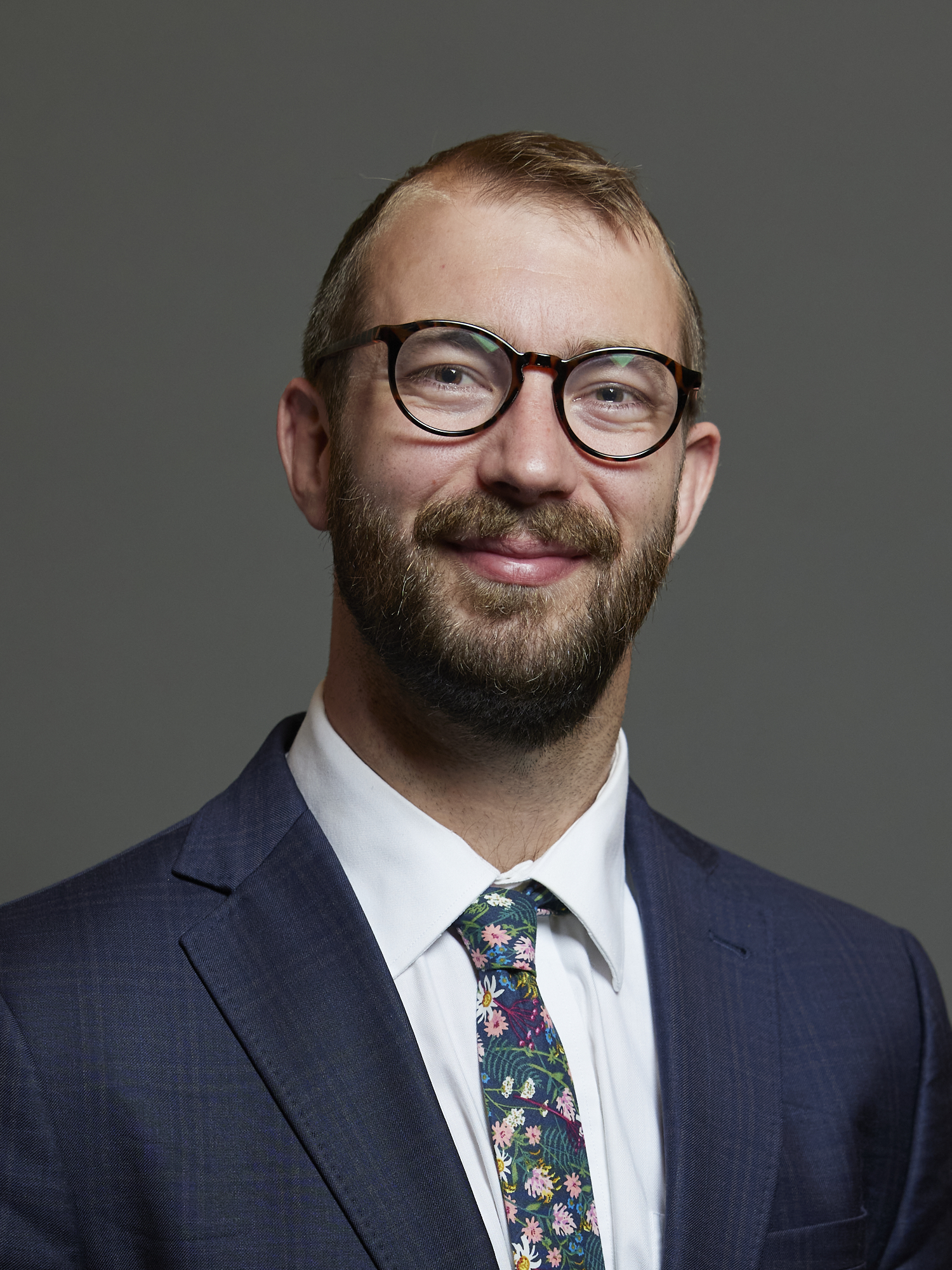
- Official portrait, 2024

Member of Parliament for Swindon North
- Incumbent
- Assumed office 4 July 2024
- Preceded by: Justin Tomlinson
- Majority: 4,103 (9.3%)

Personal details
- Born: 1980 or 1981 (age 45–46) Swindon, Wiltshire, England
- Party: Labour
- Website: https://willstone.org

Will Stone (born 1980 or 1981) is a British Labour Party politician who has been the Member of Parliament for Swindon North since 2024.

== Early life ==
Will Stone was born in Swindon, and grew up in Pinehurst. He attended the Headlands School, now Swindon Academy. He was an Army rifleman in the 1st Battalion, The Rifles.

== Election ==
Stone was elected as a councillor on Swindon Borough Council for the ward of Rodbourne Cheney in 2022. As a councillor, Stone called for more support for veterans.

He won in the Swindon North constituency as a member of the Labour Party at the 2024 general election, defeating the Conservative Party incumbent Justin Tomlinson by a margin of 4,103 votes (9.3%). Since his election as MP, he has raised vocal support for veterans, supporting the community through working alongside veterans charities like Head Up and urging the government to provide veterans with more opportunities.

== Parliamentary career ==
In early 2025, Stone was appointed as a 'business champion' of defence and green technology by the Labour Party.

He established and chairs the APPG on UK Defence Supply Chain

== Road safety ==
In February 2025, Stone introduced a Ten Minute Rule Bill to amend the Road Traffic Act 1988, which would make death caused by an unlicensed driver a careless driving offence under Section 3. Stone was motivated to introduce the bill in response to the death of 14-year-old teenager from Swindon, who was killed by an unlicensed driver in 2022. After the bill did not progress past its second reading due to debate time being used on the Terminally Ill (Adults) End of Life Bill, Stone put forward two amendments to the Police and Crime Bill, which would (1) make the maximum penalty for a driver convicted of driving without a licence who has never held one six months in prison or an unlimited fine or both. (2) make it possible to send someone who does not stop after an accident to prison for up to a year or to give them an unlimited fine. Following this the government confirmed it was considering addressing this issue in the Road Safety strategy.

The Government announced their Road Safety Strategy on 7 January 2026, announcing that Mr Stone's amendments to the Police and Crime Bill, addressing both a lack of license and insurance would be included in the Strategy's consultation.

== Positions ==
On 20 May 2025, Stone spoke out in favour of transgender rights in the United Kingdom saying "We should be doing our utmost to protect the trans community and ensure they have the same rights as everyone else and that they can live in dignity".

Stone has also urged for improvements by Thames Water for their repeated failings in Swindon, accusing them of "failing spectacularly" and urging they claw back the £2.5mn of bonuses paid to senior executives in April and scrap plans to pay the same package again in December and instead reinvest the money into water infrastructure.

During the 2025 Freedom Flotilla, Stone supported Swindon North resident Mohammed Ali, and alongside Home Office ministers secured his release from an Israeli jail.

== Personal life ==
Stone is a black belt in both Judo and Brazilian jiu-jitsu.

Parliament of the United Kingdom
Preceded by Justin Tomlinson	Member of Parliament for Swindon North; 2024–present	Incumbent
