= Elinor Goodman =

UK journalist (born 1946)

Elinor Mary Goodman (born 11 October 1946) is a UK journalist, best known as political editor of Channel 4 News from 1988 to 2005. She was educated at the Manor House School, an independent school in Surrey, England.

Goodman joined Channel 4 News as political correspondent in 1982. Prior to her employment at Channel 4, she worked for the Financial Times.

Goodman was appointed in 2005 to chair the Affordable Rural Housing Commission established by DEFRA.

Since her retirement from Channel 4 she has been a regular presenter of the BBC Radio 4 programme The Week in Westminster. She lives in Pewsey, Wiltshire.

On 20 July 2011 British prime minister David Cameron announced that Goodman would serve as one of six panel members of the public inquiry led by Lord Justice Leveson into the hacking of phones by News International.
