= David Stoddart, Baron Stoddart of Swindon =

British politician (1926–2020)

The Right Honourable The Lord Stoddart of Swindon
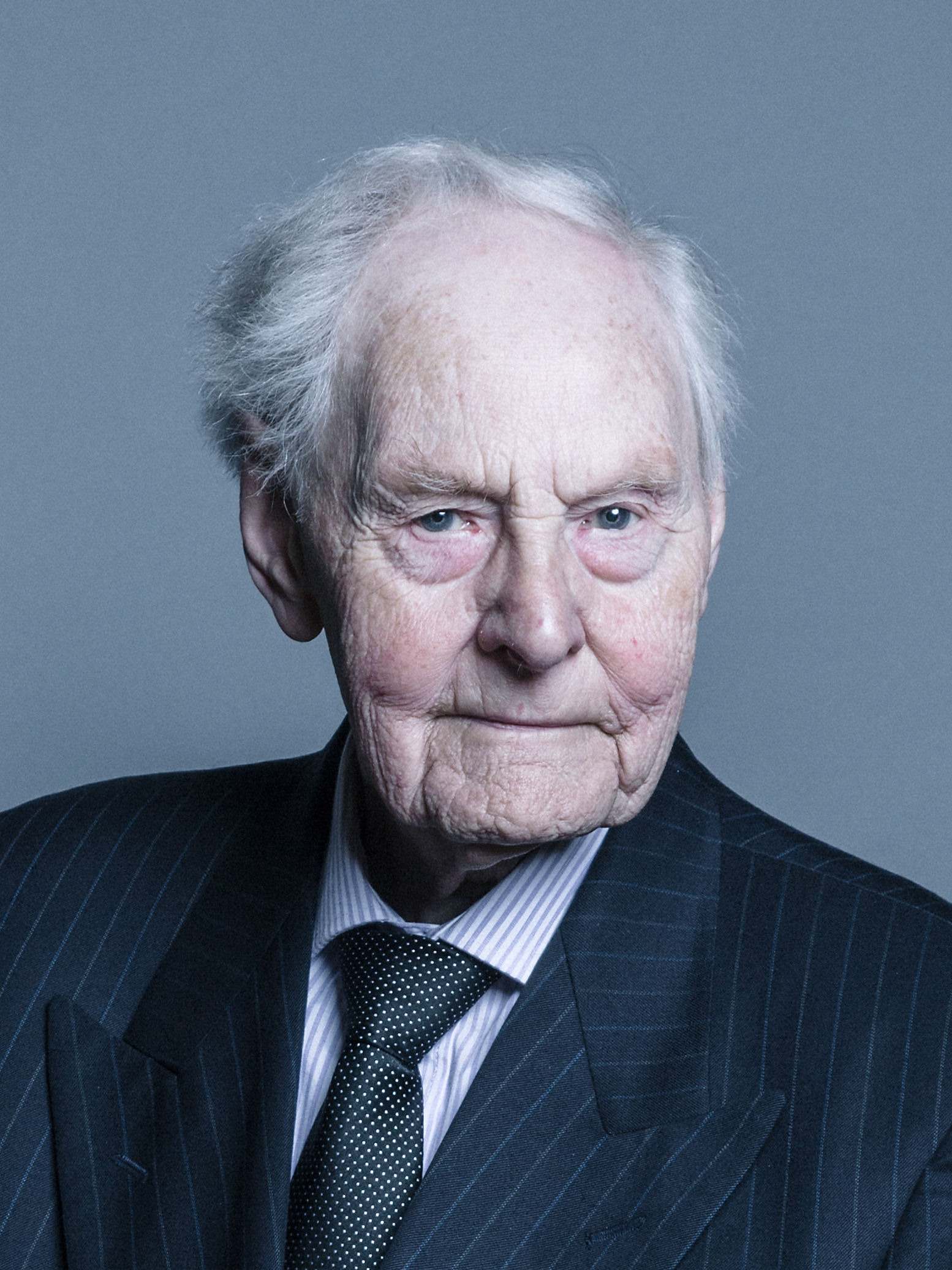
- Official portrait, 2017

Lord Commissioner of the Treasury Government Whip
- In office 4 April 1976 – 18 November 1977

Member of the House of Lords
- Lord Temporal
- Life peerage 14 September 1983 – 14 November 2020

Member of Parliament for Swindon
- In office 18 June 1970 – 13 May 1983
- Preceded by: Christopher Ward
- Succeeded by: Simon Coombs

Personal details
- Born: David Leonard Stoddart; 4 May 1926
- Died: 14 November 2020 (aged 94)
- Party: Independent Labour (2001–2020); Labour (1947–2001)
- Spouse: Jennifer Percival-Alwyn (m. 1961)
- Children: 3
- Education: St Clement Danes Holborn Estate Grammar School for Boys; Henley Grammar School

David Leonard Stoddart, Baron Stoddart of Swindon (4 May 1926 – 14 November 2020) was a British politician who served as Member of Parliament (MP) for Swindon from 1970 to 1983, and as a life peer in the House of Lords from 1983 to his death in 2020. He served as a Labour peer from 1983 to 2002, when he was expelled from the Labour benches, after which he sat as an Independent Labour peer until his death.

== Early life and career ==
David Leonard Stoddart was born on 4 May 1926 to Arthur and Queenie Stoddart. He was educated at St Clement Danes Holborn Estate Grammar School for Boys and Henley Grammar School. Upon leaving school he worked as a trainee for the GPO telephones division, as a manager at a grocery shop, as a clerk on the railways and in hospitals, and finally as a clerical worker for the Central Electricity Generating Board (CEGB) at the power station it operated in Earley, near Reading.

== Political career ==
Stoddart joined the Labour Party in 1947. He was a member of the County Borough Council of Reading from 1954 to 1972 and the leader of the council from 1967 to 1972.

Stoddart was the Labour candidate for Newbury in 1959 and 1964, and narrowly lost at Swindon in a by-election in 1969.

Stoddart became the Labour Member of Parliament for Swindon in 1970, but in 1983 he lost his seat to the Conservative Simon Coombs. Stoddart was a government whip from 1975 to 1978, Parliamentary Private Secretary to the Minister for Housing from 1974 to 1975 and opposition frontbench spokesman on trade and industry.

== House of Lords ==
Stoddart was raised to the peerage as a life peer on 14 September 1983 taking the title Baron Stoddart of Swindon, of Reading in the Royal County of Berkshire. He was Chief Front Bench spokesman on energy (1983–1988) and served as House of Lords Whip during the same period.

He was expelled from the Labour benches in the House of Lords in 2002 for backing a Socialist Alliance candidate at the 2001 general election, an action he took because he strongly opposed the "parachuting" of Shaun Woodward, a defector from the Conservative Party, into the safe Labour seat of St Helens South.

Stoddart was for many years the Chairman of the Campaign for an Independent Britain, which campaigned for the United Kingdom to end its membership of the European Union, a position he held from 1985 until May 2007.

== Personal life ==
Stoddart married Jennifer Percival-Alwyn in 1961, with whom he had two sons. He also had a daughter from a previous marriage.

== Death ==
Stoddart died on 14 November 2020, at the age of 94, following a short illness.

Parliament of the United Kingdom
Preceded by Christopher Ward	Member of Parliament for Swindon; 1970–1983	Succeeded by Simon Coombs
