= Bernard Connolly =

British economist

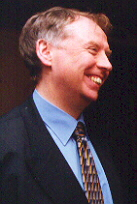
Bernard Connolly

Bernard Connolly is a British economist noted for his dislike of the euro. He is known for writing The Rotten Heart of Europe: The Dirty War for Europe's Money.

== Biography ==
Connolly worked in the Industrial Trends and Forecasting Unit of the Confederation of British Industry.

Before joining AIG Connolly had spent a number of years working with the European Commission in Brussels, where he was head of the unit responsible for the European Monetary System and monetary policies. While at the Commission Connolly was a Member of the Monetary Policy and Foreign Exchange Policy sub-committees of the Committee of Central Bank Governors and was on the OECD Group of High-Level Monetary Experts.

After writing The Rotten Heart of Europe: The Dirty War for Europe's Money, a negative treatment of the European Exchange Rate Mechanism, he was suspended in 1995 from his employment at the European Commission. An appeal of his suspension to the European Court of Justice was unsuccessful.

Prior to establishing CI, Connolly had spent 11 years as the global strategist for Banque AIG and AIG Trading.

As of 2011, Connolly, 61, was working as a financial consultant in New York City.

Connolly currently heads Connolly Insight LP and participates in Hamiltonian Associates.

He continues to have a negative view on the euro, and is a strong supporter of Brexit.

== Publications ==
The publication of The Rotten Heart of Europe led the Wall Street Journal Europe to name Connolly as one of its outstanding Europeans of the year in 1995 and in March 2001 he received the Frøde Jakobsen prize, awarded in Denmark for outstanding moral courage in public affairs. More recently, Bank of Canada Governor Mark Carney has identified Connolly as one of the very few economists who predicted the 2010 era global economic and financial crisis.

=== Books ===
- The Rotten Heart of Europe: The Dirty War for Europe's Money
- You Always Hurt the One You Love: Central Banks and the Murder of Capitalism

=== Reports ===
- Europe – Driver or Driven? EMU and the Lust for Crisis, ACI Congress, May 30, 2008

== Works ==
- The Rotten Heart of Europe: The Dirty War for Europe's Money, Faber & Faber (June 1996), hardcover, 427 pages, ISBN 0571175201, ISBN 978-0571175208; trade paperback, Faber & Faber (November 1, 1997), 432 pages, ISBN 057117521X, ISBN 978-0571175215
- AIG Trading Group and Banque AIG Past Research
