= Wavell Wakefield, 1st Baron Wakefield of Kendal =

England international rugby union player

The Lord Wakefield of Kendal
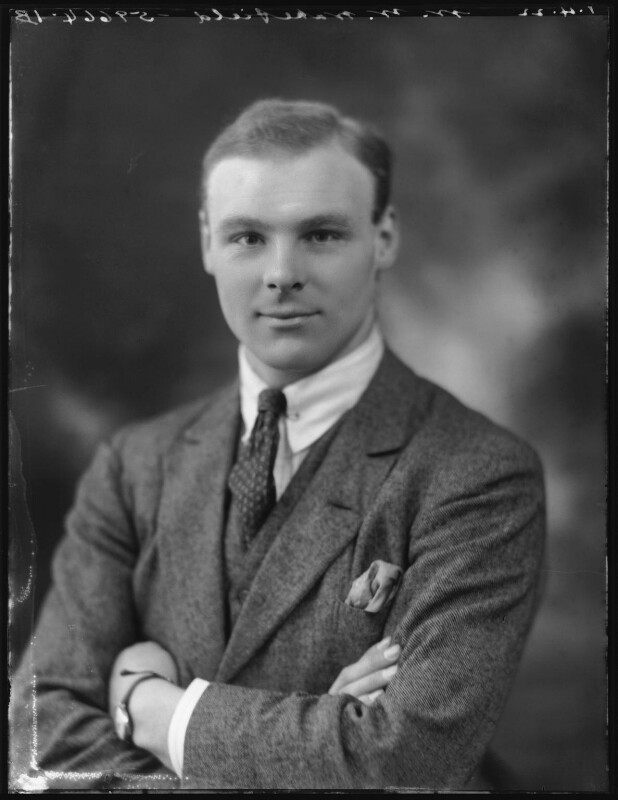
- Born: William Wavell Wakefield; 10 March 1898 Beckenham, Kent, England
- Died: 12 August 1983 (aged 85) Kendal, Cumbria, England
- School: Sedbergh School
- University: Pembroke College, Cambridge
- Occupation(s): RAF Officer, Entrepreneur, Rugby Administrator & Politician

Rugby union career
- Position: Flanker
Senior career
Years	Team	Apps	(Points)
1919-1923	Royal Air Force	22	(24)
1919-1930	Harlequins	136	(184)
1921-1922	Cambridge University	26	(22)
1921-1924	Leicester	29	(30)
1924-1929	Middlesex	23	(12)
1925-1929	Barbarians	3	(3)
1919-1930	Trial, Charity & Exhibition Games	22	(21)
International career
Years	Team	Apps	(Points)
1920-1927	England	31	(6)

William Wavell Wakefield, 1st Baron Wakefield of Kendal (10 March 1898 – 12 August 1983), known as Sir Wavell Wakefield between 1944 and 1963, was an English rugby union player and captain for Harlequins, Leicester Tigers, The RAF, Middlesex, The Barbarians and England. After retiring he went on to become the President of the Rugby Football Union and Conservative politician.

== Early life ==
Wakefield was born in Beckenham, Kent, the eldest son of Roger William Wakefield. He was the brother of Sir Edward Wakefield, 1st Baronet, also a Conservative politician. His youngest brother, Roger Cuthbert Wakefield, also an accomplished rugby player for Cambridge University, Harlequins and toured with the 1927 British Lions to Argentina.

He attended Sedbergh School, then in Yorkshire, now Cumbria, leaving during the First World War to join the Royal Naval Air Service Training Establishment Crystal Palace on January 21, 1917. He subsequently transferred to the Royal Air Force with the rank of Flight Officer and was sponsored to take a degree in mechanical sciences at Pembroke College, Cambridge by the Air Ministry, graduating in 1923.

== Rugby career ==
Wakefield won every major honor open to him in a glittering career. He was involved in three England grand slam winning sides, captaining two back to back in 1923 and 1924. He captained the RAF to an Inter-Service championship in 1923, Cambridge University to a Varsity win in 1922 and Middlesex to the County Championship in 1929. He also won three Middlesex Sevens tournaments.

In February 1919 Wakefield was ordered by the Air Ministry to report to London to join the RAF rugby side being formed for the Inter-Services League. He was made secretary, selector and captain at the same time with great encouragement from Marshal of the RAF Sir Hugh Trenchard and Air Marshal Sir John Salmond. They won the 1923 championship.

In October 1919 he debuted for Harlequins against Richmond and continued to play for the club for the next eleven years. He occasionally played for other teams during this time, but Harlequins was always his main club. 82 of his 136 games were as captain.

Wakefield played for Leicester Tigers between 1921 and 1924 playing 29 games and scoring 10 tries. He was captain in all but one game he played for the club.

In 1920, Wakefield made his England debut against Wales, appearing 31 times, 13 as captain. He led England to back-to-back Grand Slams. His final appearance for England was against France in April 1927.

His final rugby appearance came on January 25, 1930 for Harlequins against Cambridge University, a team he had captained to a Varsity win eight years earlier. He played 292 senior games, scoring 305 points. His influence on the game had been significant. As an excellent all-round athlete he revolutionized the role of the back row forward. Prior to Wakefield their role was mainly static—pushing in the set scrum and winning the ball in loose scrums. Wakefield's athleticism enabled a more dynamic role: pressuring the opposition half backs in defence and supporting the attacks of the three quarters. Rugby historian Barry Bowker described Wakefield thus; "A complete footballer, he had all the attributes – strength, weight and speed – of a great forward. He was a master of the art of dribbling with pace, was up with his backs to share in an attack and took and gave passes well".

== Rugby Sevens ==
Wakefield was a strong supporter of sevens rugby. This was especially the case with The Middlesex Sevens competition. He was a member of the Harlequins team that won the inaugural 1926 tournament and also in 1928 and 1929. He was not available in 1927, when Harlequins also won.

== Post rugby retirement ==
Wakefield remained involved in rugby as a speaker, organizer and official at charity and exhibition games. His involvement with such games began in 1923 when he played in a game to celebrate the centenary of Rugby Football with a special match played at "The Close" at Rugby School. An England/Wales XV beat a Scotland/Ireland XV 21-16.

He was President of the Rugby Football Union in 1950 and the International Board 1954-1961. From 1950 to 1980 he was president of Harlequins. An all-round sportsman, Wakefield also became the president of the Ski Club of Great Britain, the British Sub-Aqua Club and the British Water Ski Federation.

== Military service ==
Wakefield attended the Craig School at Windermere, then to Sedbergh School. He stated his lifelong interest in flying upon seeing his uncle Edward’s hydro-aero plane Waterbird be the first to successfully take off from Lake Windermere. This led to him to join the Royal Naval Air Service, subsequently being transferred to the Royal Air Force when it was established in 1918. Having completed his training he was an instructor at various locations, including Cranwell, where he also acted as duty night pilot against Zeppelins.

Subsequently Wakefield was heavily involved with trials of flights from ships. He was the first and only pilot to land on and several days later take off from HMS Vindictive, flying in a Sopwith Pup. He retired as a Flight Lieutenant in 1923 and transferred to the Reserve. He won the first air race for RAF Reserve Officers in 1924. In WWII he was Parliamentary Private Secretary to the Parliamentary Under-Secretary of State for Air between 1940 and ’42, the first director of the Air Training Corps from 1941.

== Business and political career ==
In 1931, Wakefield joined the Rediffusion radio company. He was involved in many businesses including British Relay Services and Park Royal Vehicles.

In 1935, he moved into politics, becoming Conservative Member of Parliament (MP) for Swindon. At the 1945 general election, he moved to St Marylebone. He was knighted in 1944 and in 1963, upon retiring from Parliament, was raised to the peerage as Baron Wakefield of Kendal, of Kendal in the County of Westmorland. For many years he was an active member of the Conservative Monday Club.

In August 1945 The Jewish Chronicle reported that "antisemitism on the part of [Conservative] party supporters had led many local political associations not to select Jewish candidates". During the election campaign of that year, Conservative candidate Wavell Wakefield said that Jewish refugees should be repatriated to solve London's housing crisis.

Apart from his sporting and political careers Wakefield was instrumental in the preservation of the Ullswater 'Steamers' and the Ravenglass & Eskdale Railway, through his Lake District Estates company. In 1954, Wakefield bought a controlling shareholding in Ullswater 'Steamers', saving the company from bankruptcy. In 1960, along with Midlands stockbroker Colin Gilbert, he purchased the Ravenglass & Eskdale Railway from the Keswick Granite Company in order to prevent its closure. After Colin Gilbert's death in 1968, he became the sole owner. Upon Wakefield's death, his daughter, the Hon. Joan Raynsford OBE, took over as the head director of the railway company. His other two daughters, Sheila Hensman OBE and Ruth Adorian OBE, also became active directors.

== Personal life ==
Lord Wakefield of Kendal died in August 1983, aged 85, when the barony became extinct. In 1999 Wakefield was inducted as the first English member of the International Rugby Hall of Fame.

Coat of arms of Wavell Wakefield, 1st Baron Wakefield of Kendal
Crest A bat displayed Proper charged on each wing with a crescent Argent. Escutcheon Argent two barrulets Sable between three owls Proper. Supporters Dexter a skier with skis and sticks Proper, sinister a figure representing a member of the England Rugby Football team with ball Proper. Motto Be Just And Fear Not

Parliament of the United Kingdom
Preceded by Christopher Addison	Member of Parliament for Swindon; 1935 – 1945	Succeeded by Thomas Reid
Preceded by Alec Cunningham-Reid	Member of Parliament for St Marylebone; 1945 – 1963	Succeeded by Quintin Hogg
Sporting positions
Preceded by Dave Davies	English National Rugby Union Captain; 1924–1926	Succeeded by Leonard Corbett
Peerage of the United Kingdom
New creation	Baron Wakefield of Kendal; 1963–1983	Extinct
