= Reginald Mitchell Banks =

British politician and judge

Sir Reginald Mitchell Banks, KC (26 August 1880 – 9 July 1940) was a British Conservative politician and County Court judge. He was Member of Parliament for Swindon between 1922–29 and 1931–34. He married Eva Epstein (born Ehrmann, widow of Edward Epstein, of Louisville, Kentucky) in 1926 and became the step-father of Edward Melcarth.

The son of surgeon Sir William Mitchell Banks, Banks was born in Liverpool. He was educated at Rugby and Christ Church, Oxford, where he was senior classical scholar. He was called to the bar by the Inner Temple in 1905. He took silk in 1923, was Recorder of Wigan from 1928 to 1934, and was elected a bencher of the Inner Temple in 1930.

During the First World War, he enlisted in the 1st/5th Battalion, The East Surrey Regiment, before being commissioned into the Indian Army Reserve and attached to the 1st/5th Gurkha Rifles. He served in India and Mesopotamia, before being appointed as a military censor in the Press Bureau in 1917.

He was elected Conservative Member of Parliament for Swindon in 1922, serving until being defeated by Christopher Addison in 1929. He was elected again for Swindon in 1931, but stepped down upon his appointment as a County Court judge in 1934, and held the office until his death in 1940. He was knighted in the 1928 Birthday Honours.
