= Willmot =

Willmot may refer to:

== Places ==
- Willmot, New South Wales, a suburb of Sydney

== People ==
- Eric Willmot (1936–2019), Australian scholar, educator, writer, and engineer
- Ernest Willmot Sloper (born Ernest Willmott; 1871–1916), British-born South African architect
- Donald G. Willmot (1916–1994), Canadian businessman and philanthropist
- George Willmot (1908–1977), British archaeologist and museum curator

== See also ==
- Wilmot (disambiguation)
- Wilmots, a surname
- Willmott, a surname
- Wilmotte, a surname
