= Wilmot =

Wilmot may refer to:

== Places ==
=== Australia ===
- Division of Wilmot, an abolished Australian Electoral Division in Tasmania
- Wilmot, Tasmania, a locality in the North-West Region

=== Canada ===
- Wilmot, Nova Scotia, an unincorporated rural community and former township
- Wilmot, Ontario, a township
- Wilmot, Prince Edward Island, a neighbourhood of Summerside
- Wilmot Islands, Nunavut
- Wilmot Parish, New Brunswick

=== New Zealand ===
- Wilmot Pass, a mountain pass
- Wilmot River
- Lake Wilmot, the mouth of the Wilmot River

=== United States ===
- Wilmot, Arkansas, a city
- Wilmot, Indiana, an unincorporated community
- Wilmot, Kansas, an unincorporated community
- Wilmot, an unincorporated community in Kingston Township, Michigan
- Wilmot, New Hampshire, a town
- Wilmot, North Carolina, an unincorporated community
- Wilmot, Ohio, a village
- Wilmot, South Dakota, a city
- Wilmot, Virginia, an unincorporated community
- Wilmot, Wisconsin, a census-designated place and unincorporated community

=== Other places ===
- Wilmot Township (disambiguation)

== People ==
- Wilmot (surname)
- Wilmot (given name)
- Baron Wilmot of Selmeston

== Titles ==
- Viscount Wilmot, a title held by two men in the 16th and 17th centuries
- Baron Wilmot, a title held by Henry Wilmot, 1st Earl of Rochester, in the 17th century
- Wilmot baronets, three titles, one still extant

== Other uses ==
- Wilmott (magazine)
- Wilmot (TV series), a children's sitcom
- USS R. W. Wilmot (SP-604), a 1918 United States Navy patrol vessel

== See also ==
- Wilmots, a surname
- Willmot, New South Wales, Australia, a suburb of Sydney
- Willmott, a surname
- Wilmotte, a surname
