= Sir Harold Mitchell, 1st Baronet =

British businessman and Conservative politician

Escutcheon of the Mitchell baronets of Tulliallan and Luscar

Sir Harold Paton Mitchell, 1st Baronet, JP, DL (21 May 1900 – 8 April 1983) was a British businessman and Conservative politician. He was born in Carnock, Fife, as the eldest son of Alexander Mitchell (1871–1934) and Meta Mary Graham Paton. Alexander Mitchell was a grandson of William Mitchell, a Scottish entrepreneur who co-founded the Alloa Coal Company.

== Political career ==
Mitchell represented Brentford and Chiswick in Parliament from 1931 to 1945. He was created a baronet, of Tulliallan in the County of Fife and of Luscar in the Province of Alberta in the Dominion of Canada, in September 1945, in recognition of his "political and public services".

He was vice-chairman of the Conservative Party under Winston Churchill. During the 1920s, he was a member of Clackmannan Union Agricultural Society (vice-president from 1927).

== Military service ==
When the Second World War broke out, Mitchell served as a Liaison Officer with the Polish Army, then commanded the Welfare Office for the Anti-Aircraft Command. He was Honorary Colonel of the Scottish-based 61 Signal Regiment TAVR in 1963.

== Business career ==
Mitchell was a director of a number of companies, including:

- London and North Eastern Railway Company,
- The New Zealand and Australian Land Company Ltd,
- The Ben Line Steamers (from 1925),
- The Alloa Glass Works Company (from 1928),
- The Stirling Brickworks (chairman),
- The New Main Brick Works Ltd (from 1938), and
- The Alloa Coal Company (from 1926).

In 1920, Mitchell invested in and turned around the failing Mountain Park Coal Company in Canada. This company formed the core of the later Mitchell-controlled company named Luscar. He was an investor in the Globe and Phoenix Gold Mining Company Ltd. in Southern Africa. He had extensive mining interests in Canada and the United States (Luscar). He left the United Kingdom after his mines and a railway he owned were nationalised after the Second World War (circa 1947), and he subsequently refused to keep any of his money there.

Mitchell purchased Tulliallan Castle in 1923 from the estate of Sir James Sivewright, and he sold it to the Scottish Home Department in 1950 for £9,100. He invested money in a game farm and afforestation projects on the estate. He also had a number of estates in Bermuda (his main residency during his later years), Jamaica, Honduras, Portugal, Fiji, Brazil and Guatemala.

== Personal life ==
Mitchell married Mary Pringle in 1947. They had one daughter, Mary-Jean Mitchell. He was an accomplished downhill skier (he published a book on the subject in 1931), one of his many leisure activities. He set up a pipe band competition in Alloa during the early 1930s. He became Joint Master of the Lauderdale Hunt in Roxburghshire, with his brother Alex, upon the death of their father in 1934. He maintained a stable of show horses before the Second World War.

In later life, he became a lecturer and author on Caribbean subjects and wrote several books, including two on Caribbean economics and politics in 1967. In 1974, Mitchell purchased the islands of Nananu-i-Cake and Mabua off the coast of Viti Levu, in Fiji.

Mitchell died in April 1983, aged 82, at which point his title became extinct. A foundation was set up with his money after his death. It has funded various projects, including the renovation of Tulliallan Graveyard in Fife (close to where he had once lived) and a donation to the University of St Andrews (where there is a building named the Sir Harold Mitchell Building, housing part of the School of Biology). Prospect College in St Mary, Jamaica, is also funded by the Mitchell Green Foundation, with awards named for Sir Harold, Lady Mitchell and Mary-Jean Mitchell.

Mitchell's daughter, Mary-Jean, married Manchester-born Peter Green in 1975. Two sons – Alexander and Andrew Green – were born to the couple. When Mary-Jean died of cancer in 1990, at the age of 38, Peter Green took over the family business. The godfather of Alexander Green (born 1980) was the late Canadian prime minister Pierre Trudeau, and the Green family remains friends with Canadian prime minister Justin Trudeau.

Parliament of the United Kingdom
Preceded by Walter Grant Morden	Member of Parliament for Brentford and Chiswick; 1931–1945	Succeeded by Francis Noel-Baker
Baronetage of the United Kingdom
New creation	Baronet (of Tulliallan and Luscar); 1945–1983	Extinct
