= Heatherden Hall =

Country house in Buckinghamshire, England

Coordinates: 51.546°N 0.534°W

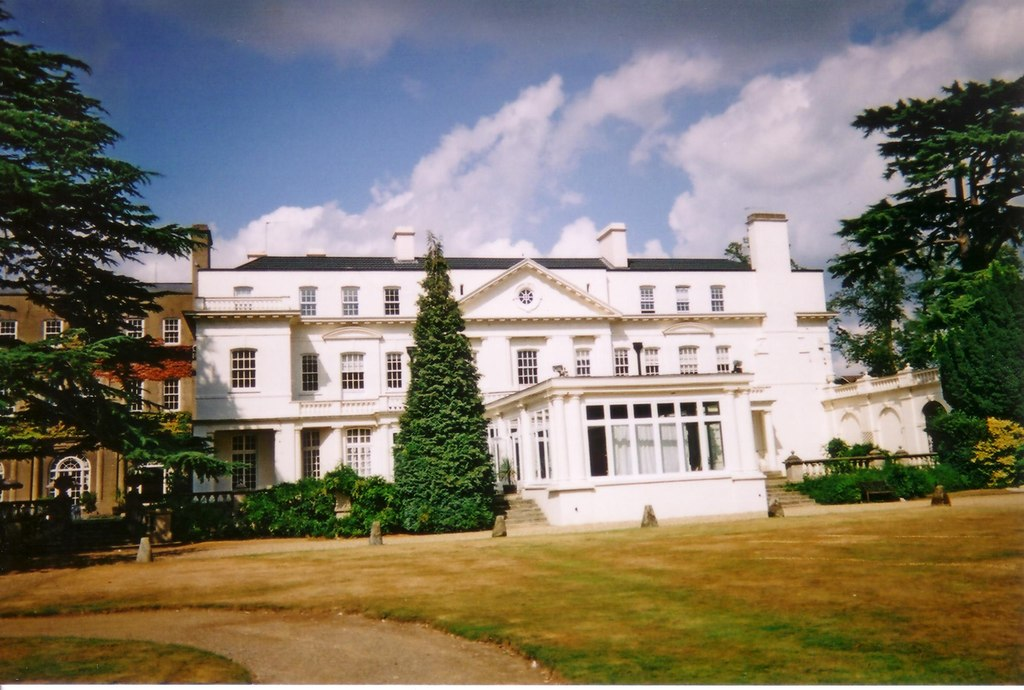
Heatherden Hall, 2011

Heatherden Hall is a Grade II-listed, Victorian country house located in Iver Heath, Buckinghamshire, England. It stands in the grounds of Pinewood Studios and is used as offices, film sets, and as a wedding venue.

It was purchased by Lieutenant-Colonel Walter Grant Morden, a Canadian financier and Member of Parliament, who transformed the mansion by adding a large ballroom and a Victorian Turkish bath. During the 1930s it became a retreat and private meeting place for politicians and diplomats.

== History ==
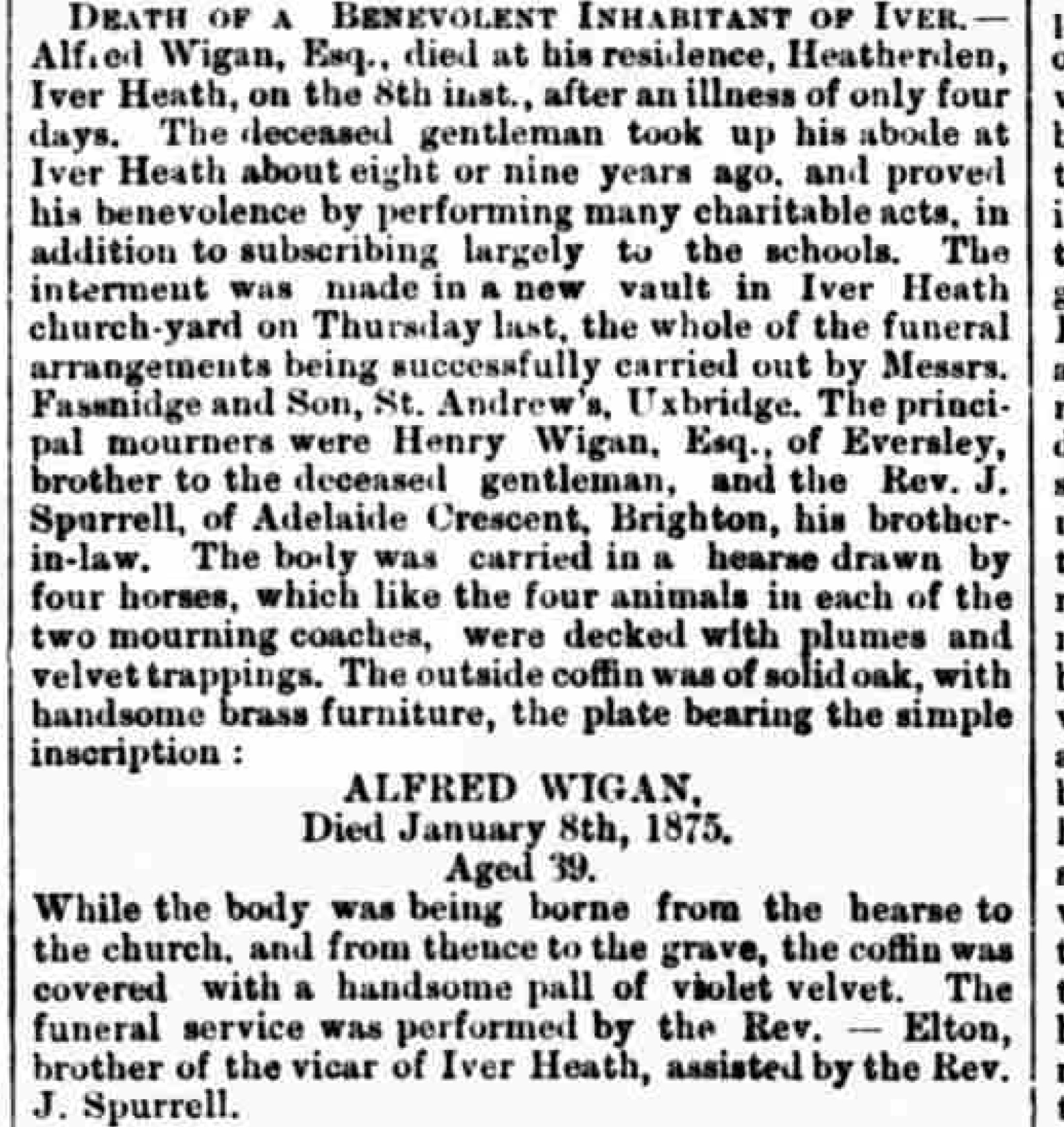
Obituary of Alfred Wigan 1875

Alfred Wigan (1835–1875) built Heatherden Hall in about 1865. He was described as “a gentleman” and appears to have had an independent income which he inherited from his father at an early age. He commissioned the architect Charles Frederick Reeks who had recently designed the nearby church of St Margarets to build his new house. At his stage it was a large villa called “Heatherden”. In 1861 he married Sophia Matilda Smith (1843–1891) The couple had no children. Alfred died after a very short illness in 1875 at the age of only 39 and was buried in St Margaret's Church mentioned above. He left his property to Sophia who continued to live at the house.

Three years later in 1878 she married Dr Michael Drury Lavin (1836–1902) and he moved into Heatherden. The 1881 census records the couple living at the house with a butler, a footman, a cook and two household servants. Michael who was a doctor was a keen huntsman and many meetings of the Queen’s Staghounds were held at Heatherden. He also owned the steam yacht “Ceylon” and sailed to distant places.

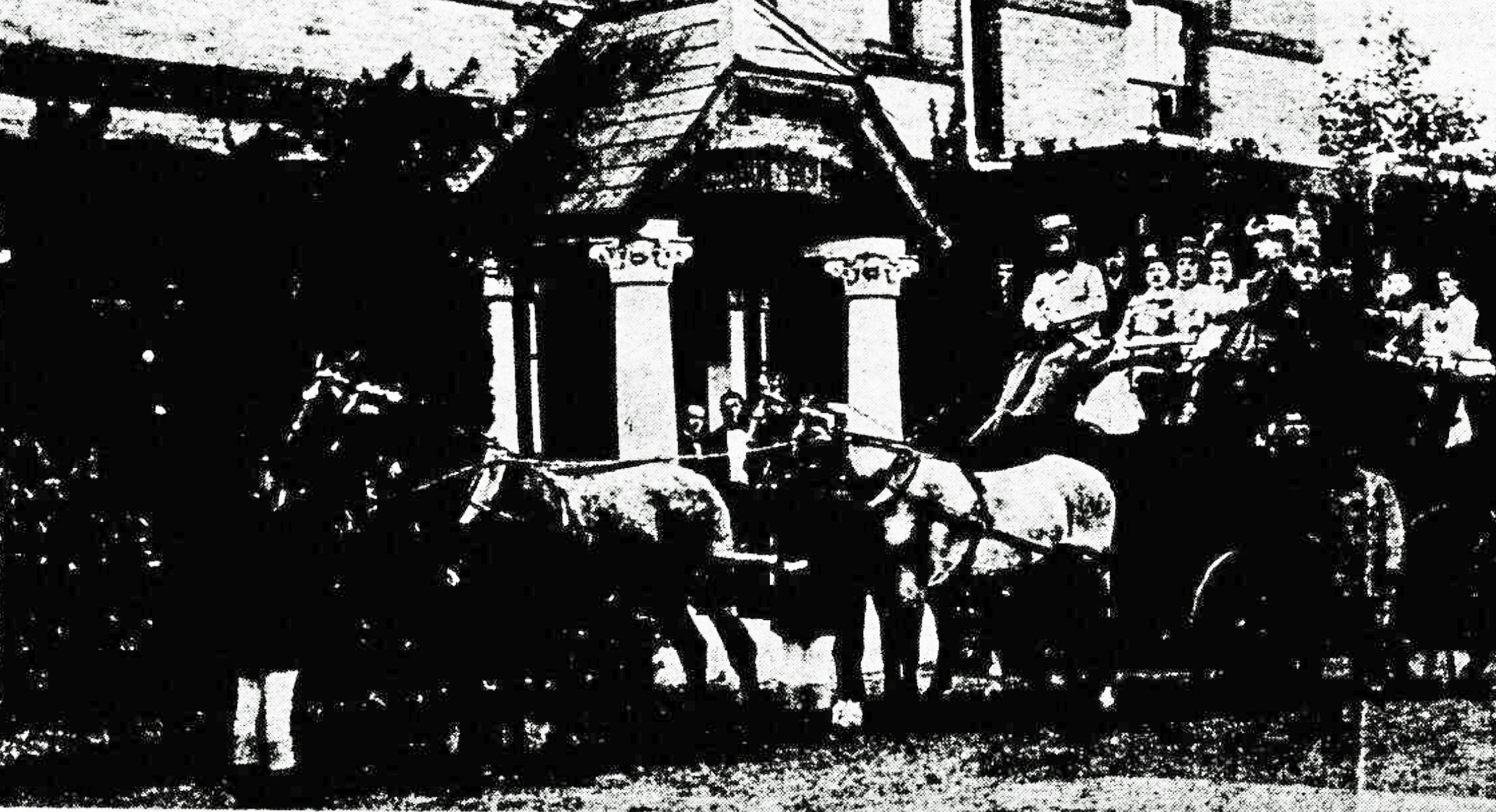
The Levin family at Heatherden Villa in about 1880

Sophia died in 1891 and in the following year Michael married Ada Brownrigg (1859–1931) who was the daughter of Sir Henry Moore Brownrigg, 3rd Baronet. The couple had one son. The Buckinghamshire Advertiser in 1987 obtained a picture from a man whose grandfather worked as a coachman for Lavin which was taken one hundred years before. It shows the Lavin family in a coach outside the Heatherden villa When Michael died in 1902 Ada inherited the house. She did not live there but instead rented it to wealthy tenants. The most notable was the famous cricketer Prince Ranjitsinhji who began his tenancy in 1907.

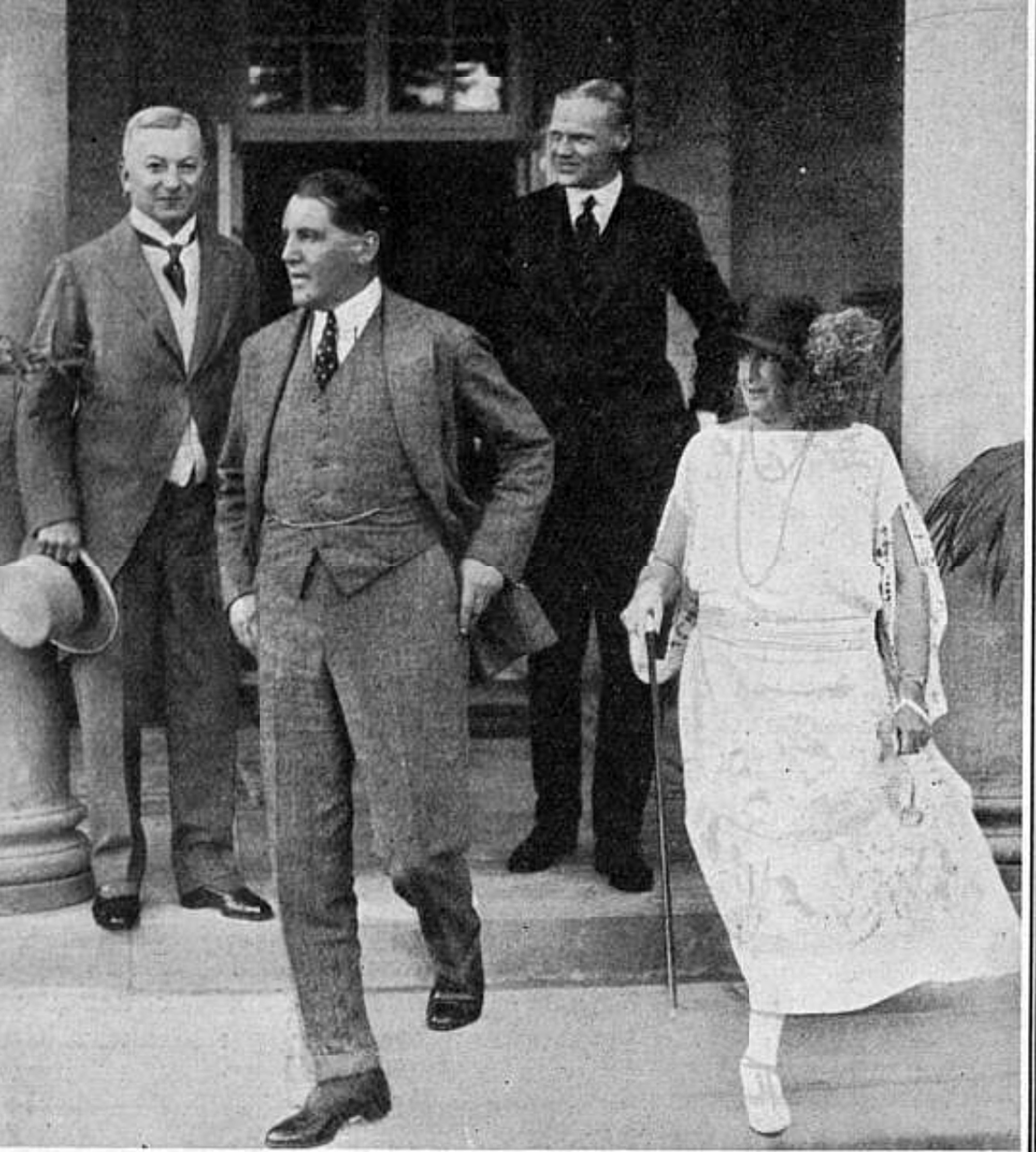
Garden party at Heatherden Hall in 1922. Left to right Walter Grant Morden, Lord Birkenhead, the Duke of Sutherland and Walter's wife Doris Morden.

In 1913 Ada sold the property to Lieutenant Colonel Walter Grant Morden (1880–1932). He was a Canadian with numerous business interests. He was the founder of the British Commonwealth Union and the Canada Steamship Lines. He was elected MP for Brentford and Chiswick in 1918 and remained in that position until 1931. In 1909 he married Doris Henshaw (1889–1974) who was the daughter of the writer and activist Julia Wilmotte Henshaw. The couple had one son and three daughters.

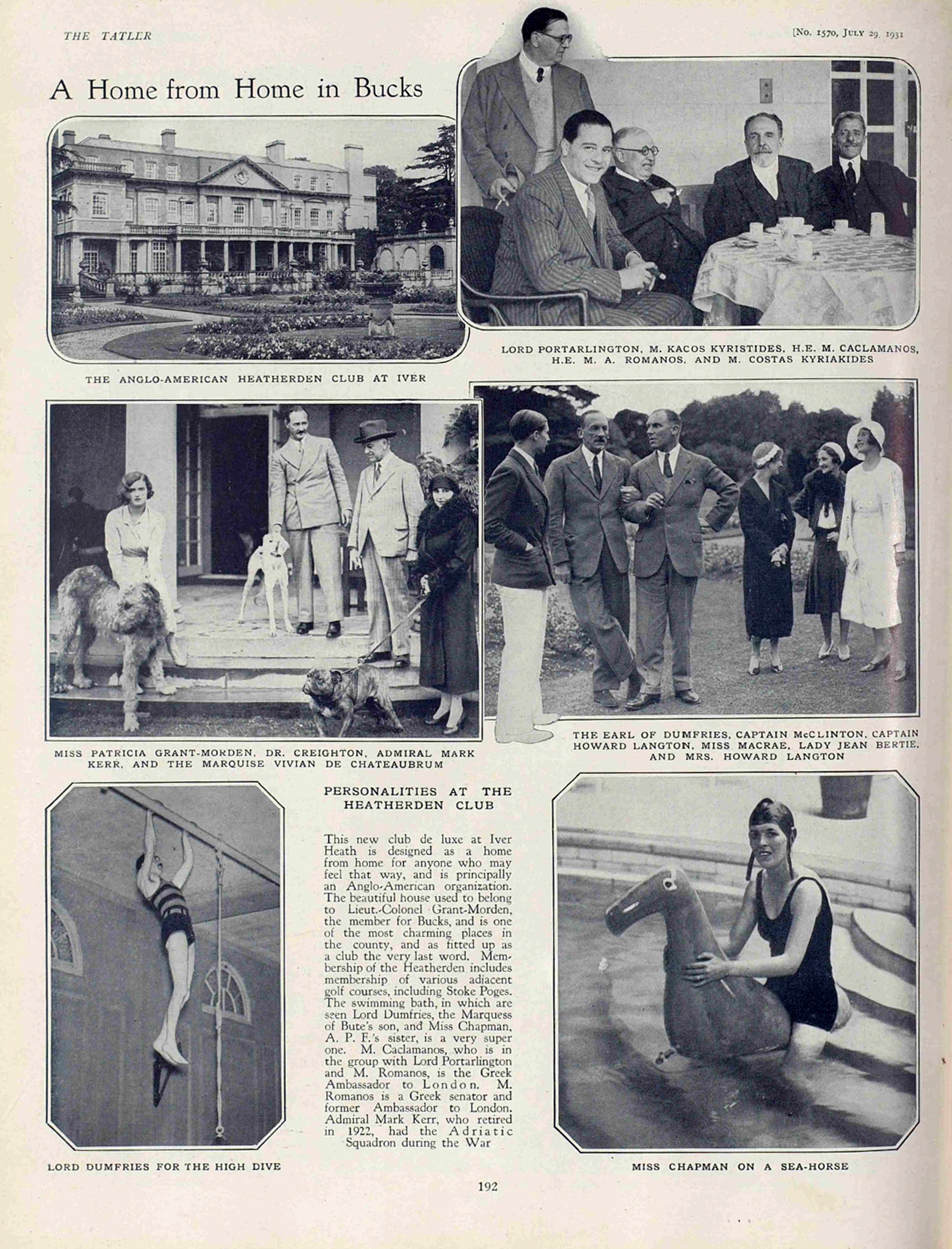
Club at Heatherden Hall 1931

In 1914 Walter commissioned the architect Charles Melville Seth-Ward to make extensive alterations and additions to the house which included a huge ballroom and a Turkish bath. The couple entertained notable people at the Hall for many years. The photo shown is a garden party at the house in 1922 with Lord Birkenhead (front) who had signed the famous Anglo-Irish Treaty with Morden at Heatherden Hall the year before. In 1930 the Mordens decided to turn the Hall into a county club. The magazine Tatler published a pictorial page on the new club, which is shown.

When Morden died in 1932, the estate was bought at auction by Charles Boot, who had recently inherited a large construction firm from his father, Henry Boot, who had died in 1931. Within a year Charles Boot had transformed Heatherden Hall into the office building for a new film studio complex that occupied the grounds.

The mansion has two main fronts: one formal three-storey entrance and another that is seen mostly in films. A conservatory was added to the front where the door was once situated, and became known as the Gatsby Suite; however, this was subsequently removed and now forms part of the enlarged outdoor terrace. The grand ballroom runs along the side. Heatherden Hall has extensive grounds with formal gardens and lakes, plants and features. The many trees surrounding the manor served as the inspiration for the name "Pinewood".

== Use in films ==
The house and gardens have been featured in many British films, including Doctor in the House, Twice Round the Daffodils, The Amazing Mr Blunden, Chitty Chitty Bang Bang, Bugsy Malone, The Prime of Miss Jean Brodie, From Russia with Love (as the SPECTRE headquarters) and the Carry On films. It has appeared in such television series as One Foot in the Grave and Midsomer Murders. The Great Celebrity Bake Off for SU2C and the Great American Baking Show are filmed on the grounds of Heatherden Hall.
