= Iver =

Civil parish in Buckinghamshire, England

Coordinates: 51.521°N 0.507°W

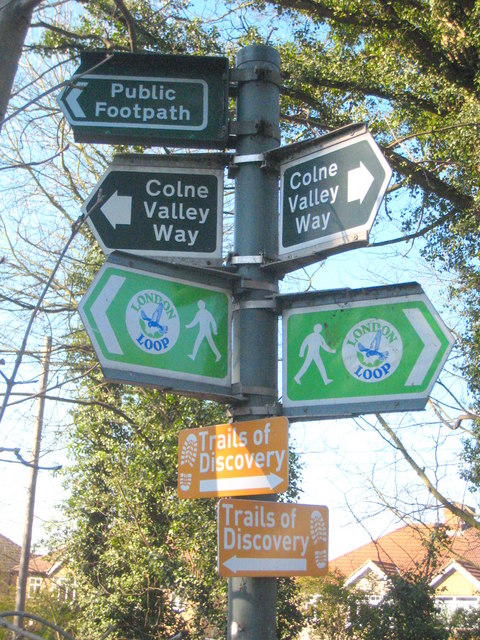
- Iver's three similar settlements form a jointly administered community. Footpaths run to the Colne Valley regional park, the train station and branch into the Chiltern Hills, London and the London Loop.

- Location within Buckinghamshire
- Area: 20.1 km^{2} (7.8 sq mi)
- Population: 11,119 (2011)
  - Density: 553/km^{2} (1,430/sq mi)
- OS grid reference: TQ0381
- Civil parish: Iver
- Unitary authority: Buckinghamshire
- Ceremonial county: Buckinghamshire
- Region: South East
- Country: England
- Sovereign state: United Kingdom
- Post town: Iver
- Postcode district: SL0
- Dialling code: 01753
- Police: Thames Valley
- Fire: Buckinghamshire
- Ambulance: South Central
- UK Parliament: Beaconsfield

Iver /ˈaɪ.vər/ is a civil parish in Buckinghamshire, England. In addition to the central clustered village, the parish includes the residential neighbourhoods Iver Heath and Richings Park and the hamlets Shreding Green and Thorney. In 2011 it had a population of 11,119.

== Geography, transport and economy ==
Part of the 43-square-mile Colne Valley regional park, with woods, lakes and land by the Grand Union Canal. Most of the open land is classified as Metropolitan Green Belt.

Surrounding the Ivers are the villages and towns Fulmer, Denham, Gerrards Cross and Wexham. Also nearby are Colnbrook, Langley, Uxbridge, Cowley, Yiewsley and West Drayton.

The Ivers have public transport and motorway links. The M25 motorway passes east of the main village, west of Iver Heath and east of Richings Park, but cannot be accessed directly from the Ivers. Instead, road links are provided to junction 5 of the M4 motorway for Langley, and to junction 1 of the M40 motorway for Denham. The junction of the M4 with the M25 is named Thorney Interchange, after the southernmost Iver neighbourhood.

Also situated on the Elizabeth line, Iver, Richings Park and Thorney are less than 0.5 miles (0.8 km) from Iver railway station, with Langley railway station and Uxbridge tube station nearby for other villages across the Ivers.

Significant employers in the parish include the businesses in Ridgeway trading and warehousing estate in Richings Park, and Pinewood Studios in Iver Heath.

== History ==
In the Domesday Book of 1086 the whole area was recorded as "Evreham" or "homestead by the brow of a hill" and it was in the possession of a man called Robert Doiley.

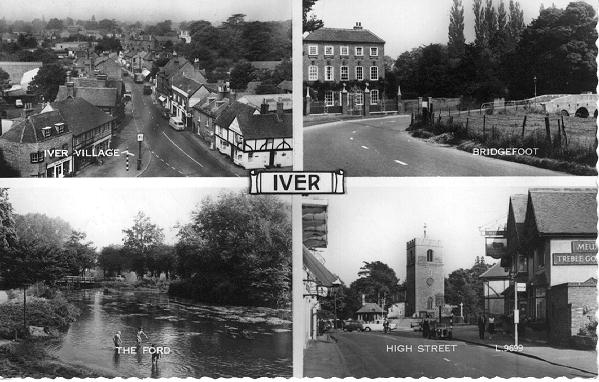
Postcard of Iver Village from the 1950s

In 1351 the area was granted a royal charter to hold a weekly market. This charter was confirmed 110 years later in 1461.

=== Iver ===
Iver village, on the Uxbridge to Langley road, has a pre-Domesday foundation and Neolithic pottery fragments and other artefacts have been discovered. The village church has shards of a Saxon window, and elements dating from the 15th century, 16th century and 17th century can be seen. The village has numerous houses from the 16th and 17th centuries.

=== Thorney ===
In the spring of 893 a Viking raiding army plundered through Kent and Sussex. After reaching Farnham in Surrey it was intercepted by Alfred the Great's son Edward with his West Saxon Fyrd. The Danes were routed, fleeing over the River Thames into Mercia with the West Saxon army in pursuit. Having reached the River Colne the Danes mounted a defence on what was known as Thorney Island, believed to be land between the Colne and an offshoot channel of the river between Thorney and Iver. Edward began a siege of the island and was joined by Æthelred of Mercia with soldiers from the Mercian garrison in London. After a prolonged stalemate an agreement was reached with the Danes that they would to leave the Angle and Saxon controlled lands peacefully and go directly to the lands in the east under Danish control which they duly did, without any of their plundered spoils.

=== Iver Heath ===
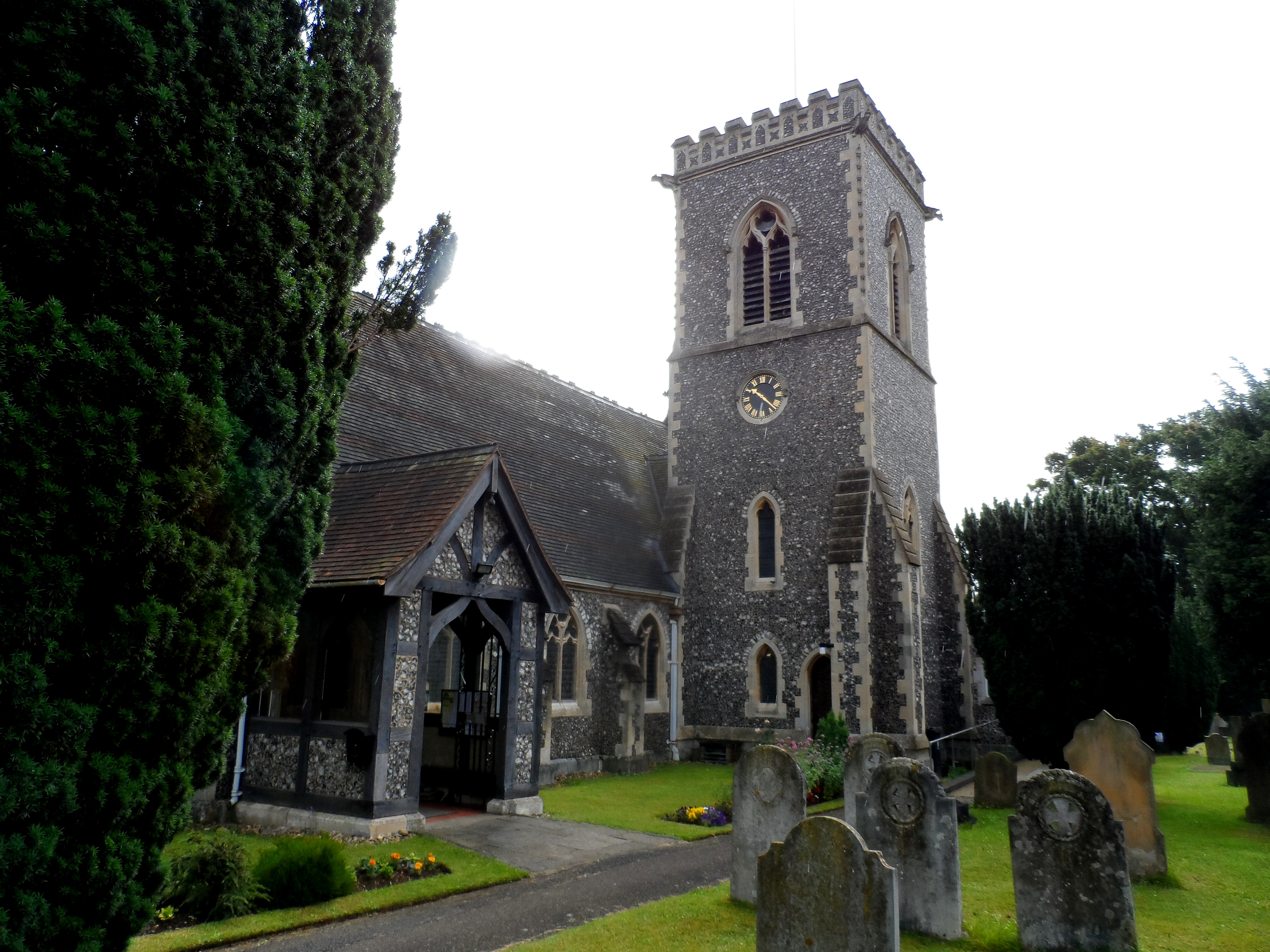
Church of Saint Margaret, Iver Heath

Iver Heath is the location of Heatherden Hall, a Victorian estate with spectacular grounds. It was purchased by Lt. Col. Grant Morden, a Canadian financier, who transformed the mansion by adding a huge ballroom and a Victorian-style Turkish bath. During the 1930s it became a retreat and private meeting place for politicians and diplomats. The agreement to form the Irish Free State was signed at Heatherden Hall. The Church of St Margaret was built in 1862. Iver Heath itself is centred on a triangle of roads. The village post office was on the Slough Road to the south, but closed in September 2020, while a parade of shops used to be found along Church Road to the north. Slough Road and Church Road are connected by Bangors Road North to the east.

=== Richings Park ===
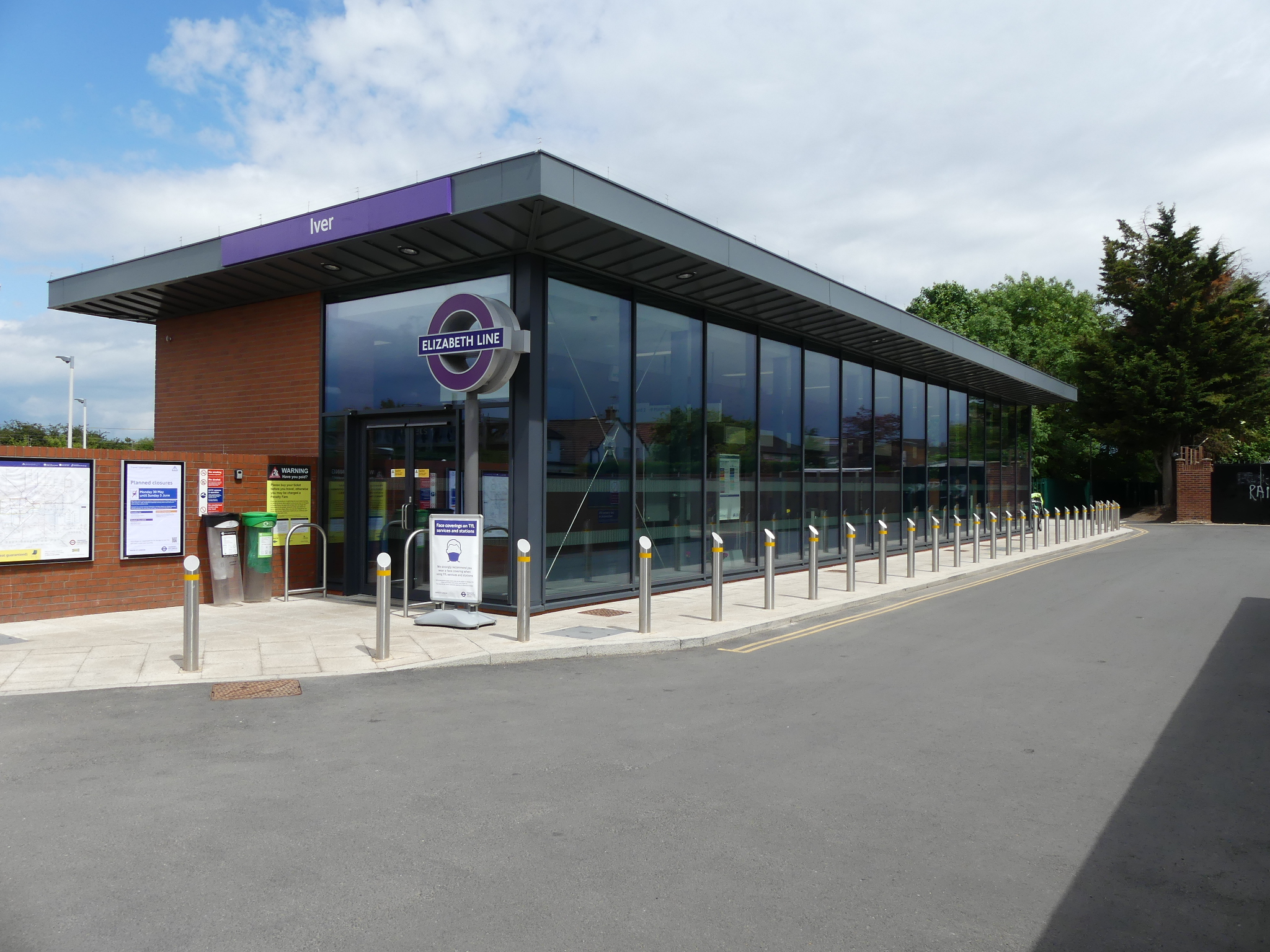
Iver railway station in Richings Park

Richings Park was once the estate of Lord Bathurst. In the 1630s, the Richings estate was owned by the Salter family, who in 1678 sold it to Sir Peter Apsley. His daughter Catherine married her cousin, Allen Bathurst, 1st Earl Bathurst. Around 1740, the estate was sold to the Earl of Hertford, and in 1776 to Sir John Coghill, 1st Baronet of Richings.

In the 1780s, the house was burned down and rebuilt. It was later the home of the Sullivan and Meeking families. Ironically, in 1924, Viola Meeking married into the Bathurst family who had held the Richings Park estate two centuries earlier.

The new Richings Park mansion, very briefly the home of RAF Bomber Command, was destroyed during World War II, and its site is now a residential area with its own shopping facilities. Local street names reflect the history of the estate. The cellars of the house are still visible in fields now overlooking the M4.

Richings Park is the location of Iver railway station on the Elizabeth line.

== Black Park Country Park and Langley Park Country Park ==
Black Park adjoins the Pinewood Studio complex. It has a lake that extends over 13 acres (5.3 ha). Due to its proximity to Pinewood Studios, Black Park was used for outdoor sequences in some of Hammer's Dracula films, a number of Carry On films, the Gerry Anderson Sci Fi series UFO and in the 1964 James Bond film Goldfinger.

To the south, Black Park is separated from Langley Park by the A412 / Uxbridge Road. Langley Park covers 130 acres (0.53 km^{2}) and is known for its rhododendron and azalea-filled Temple Gardens.

== Pinewood Studios ==
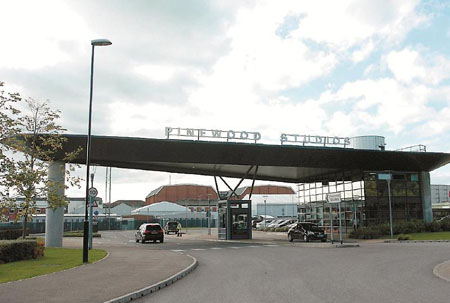
Entrance to Pinewood Studios

Pinewood Studios is a major British film studio to the immediate west of the developed land of Iver Heath, which is in all other respects residential. The studios have hosted many productions from blockbuster films to UK television shows, commercials and pop music promos. The Superman and James Bond film franchises have used the film studios which provides tours of its museum.

Pinewood was built on the estate of Heatherden Hall, a large, attractive Victorian house with spectacular grounds. The Pinewood estate had previously been purchased by Lt. Col. Grant Morden, a Canadian financier and MP for Brentford and Chiswick. He spent a fortune transforming the mansion into a showpiece home, adding refinements such as a huge ballroom, a Turkish bath and an indoor squash court. Due to its seclusion, the house was used as a discreet meeting place for high-ranking politicians and diplomats. Here the agreement for the Anglo-Irish Treaty was signed. When Grant Morden died in 1934 the estate was purchased at auction by Charles Boot, who had recently inherited a large construction firm from his father, Henry Boot, who died in 1931. Within twelve months Charles had formed a partnership with J. Arthur Rank, who transformed the mansion into the office building for a film studio complex. He based his new studios on the latest Hollywood designs of that era. Charles Boot named the complex Pinewood Film Studios, a reference to the many pine trees in the area. The entrance to the studio is on Pinewood Road.

== Activities and facilities ==
=== The Evreham Sports Centre ===
The Sports Centre is based in Iver, which is in the south of the District. The centre is run by Greenwich Leisure Limited. Facilities include a multi purpose sports hall, dance studio, lounge (with adjoining kitchen), sunbed, outdoor floodlit synthetic surface pitch, grass soccer pitches and a changing facility and fitness suite with equipment including a nautilus tread climber. The fitness suite contains pieces of equipment designed to be accessible to those persons with limited mobility.

=== Evreham Adult Learning Centre ===
Adjacent to the Sports Centre on the border of Iver Heath and Iver, this facility is a former secondary school which hosts independent and Council-run events and courses. These include Zumba, Slimming World, Pottery, Guitar and Woodwork. The venue also hosts the Tiny Toes Nursery and a Youth Centre.

=== Iver Heath Village Hall ===
Built in 1964, the New Village Hall is a registered charity which hosts an array of classes, clubs, private events and community events such as their annual Christmas fete. The hall is home to the Iver Heath Drama Club, itself founded in 1948, who perform a summer play and annual Pantomime on the hall's stage. The hall is also used for rehearsals and filming, including several scenes in the Netflix comedy "Too Much". The hall is on a site in the centre of Iver Heath which is also home to the Iver Heath Library, Iver Heath Scouts and Iver Heath Junior School.

== Demography ==
2011 Published Statistics: Population, home ownership and extracts from Physical Environment, surveyed in 2005
| Output area | Homes owned outright | Owned with a loan | Socially rented | Privately rented | Other | Usual residents | Area (km^{2}) |
|---|---|---|---|---|---|---|---|
| Civil parish | 1462 | 1720 | 569 | 377 | 43 | 11,119 | 20.09 |

== Notable people ==
- Prince Edward, Duke of Kent, member of the British royal family, lived at Coppins, Iver (1935–1972).
- Prince Michael of Kent, Edward's younger brother, was born in Iver.
- Princess Victoria (1868–1935), daughter of Edward VII, lived in Iver 1925–1935.
- Matty Cash, is an English football player who grew up in the village. He currently is playing football for Aston Villa and Poland.
- Linford Christie, is a British sprinter who lived in Iver.
- Charles Richard Fairey Founder of Fairey aviation, the Fairey factory based in West London creators of the Swordfish. The family lived at Woodlands aka Elk Meadows in Iver Heath.
- John Fairey (1935–2009), aviator son of Charles Fairey (founder of the Fairey Aviation Company), was born in Iver.
- Chris Finnegan (1944–2009) British professional boxer of Irish descent born in Iver.
- Kevin Finnegan (1948–2008) British professional boxer of Irish descent born in Iver.
- James Gambier (1756–1833), notorious admiral of the Royal Navy, lived in Iver, his gardener invented the modern day pansy
- Julian Haviland (1930-2023), former Political Editor of both ITN and The Times newspaper, was born in Iver Heath.
- Sid James (1913–1976) South African-born British actor and comedian. Lived at Delaford Park, Iver.
- Daniel Johnson (born 26 August 1957) is a British journalist who is the founding editor of Standpoint, lived in Iver.
- Luke Oliver Johnson (born 2 February 1962), is a British serial entrepreneur, best known for his involvement with Pizza Express. He is a former chairman of the Royal Society of Arts and Channel 4. Lived in Iver.
- Paul Bede Johnson (1928-2023) was an English journalist, historian, speechwriter and author. While associated with the political left in his early career, he became a conservative popular historian. Lived in Iver.
- Brian Muir, sculptor of Darth Vader's helmet and armour and the Stormtrooper armour in Star Wars, lives in Iver.
- John Nash (1893–1977), painter of landscape and still-life, grew up in Iver.
- Paul Nash, WW1 and WW2 war artist, older brother of John Nash, moved to Iver Heath aged 3 and is buried in Langley in family plot.
- David Seaman Former England goalkeeper lived in Iver.
- Martin Secker (1882–1978) London publisher who rose to prominence in the 1920s and 30s, lived at Bridgefoot House, Iver.
- Oli White (born 26 January 1995), is an English YouTuber, actor and author, born in Iver.

== See also ==
- List of civil parishes in England
