= Peter Willmott =

Peter Willmott may refer to:

- Peter Willmott (sociologist) (1923–2000), British sociologist
- Peter Willmott (businessman) (1937–2023), American businessman
