= SS Bennachie =

Bennachie was the name of two ships operated by the Ben Line (Ben Line Steamers Ltd):

- SS Bennachie (1944), sold to Liberia in 1964
- SS Bennachie (1949), scrapped in 1971
