= Roseofilum reptotaenium =

Scientific classification
- Domain: Bacteria
- Phylum: Cyanobacteria
- Class: Cyanophyceae
- Order: Oscillatoriales
- Family: Coleofasciculaceae
- Genus: Roseofilum
- Species: R. reptotaenium

Binomial name
- Roseofilum reptotaenium D. Casamatta, D. Stanic, M. Gantar, & L.L. Richardson, 2012

Species of bacterium

Roseofilum reptotaenium, also called coral killer, is a filamentous species of cyanobacteria. It is the pathogenic agent responsible for black band disease on Siderastrea siderea coral.

== Etymology ==
Genus name Roseofilum is derived from words Roseo, meaning red, and filum, meaning thread.

Species was named for the mode of growth on corals (Repto = ribbon; taenia = creeping; hence creeping ribbons).

== Description ==
Epizoic algae that is pathogen of some coral species, forming black band-shaped mats that migrate across coral tissue, actively lysing coral cells, up to several cm wide, up to 1 mm thick. Filaments typically with a single trichome. Sheath usually present, thin, colorless. Trichomes with gliding motility, slightly constricted at the crosswalls. Cells brownish red, more or less isodiametric or longer than wide, with radial thylakoids, 2.5–4.0 mm long. Trichomes with one rounded and one conical end cell.
