= SS Beaverburn (1944) =

Cargo ship

History
- Name: Empire Captain (1944-46); Beaverburn (1946-60); Bennachie (1960-64); Silvana (1964-71)
- Owner: Ministry of War Transport (1944-46); Canadian Pacific Railway (1946-60); Ben Line Steamers Ltd (1960-64); Atlantic Navigation Corporation Ltd (1964-71)
- Operator: T & J Harrison Ltd (1944-46); Canadian Pacific Steamship Co (1946-60); Ben Line Steamers Ltd (1960-64); W H Eddie Hsu (1964-71)
- Port of registry: (United Kingdom) Dundee (1944-46); (United Kingdom) London (1946-60); (United Kingdom) Leith (1960-64); (Liberia) Monrovia (1964-71)
- Builder: Caledon Shipbuilding & Engineering Co Ltd
- Yard number: 404
- Launched: 25 February 1944
- Completed: July 1944
- Identification: Code Letters BFKF (1944-60); United Kingdom Official Number 166217 (1944-64)
- Fate: Scrapped 1971.

General characteristics
- Tonnage: 9,875 GRT; 7,110 NRT; 11,975 DWT
- Length: 475 ft 8 in (144.98 m)
- Beam: 64 ft 4 in (19.61 m)
- Depth: 40 ft 0 in (12.19 m)
- Installed power: Two steam turbines
- Propulsion: Screw propeller
- Speed: 15 knots (28 km/h)

Beaverburn was a 9,875 GRT fast cargo liner which was built in 1944 for Britain's Ministry of War Transport (MoWT) as Empire Captain. In 1946 she was sold to Canada and renamed Beaverburn. In 1960, she was sold back to Britain and renamed Bennachie. In 1964, she was sold to Liberia and renamed Silvana. She served until 1971 when she was scrapped.

== Description ==
The ship was built under the Empire ships programme by Caledon Shipbuilding & Engineering Co Ltd, Dundee, as yard number 404. She was launched on 25 February 1944 and completed in July.

The ship was 475 feet 8 inches (144.98 m) long, with a beam of 64 feet 4 inches (19.61 m) and a depth of 40 feet 0 inches (12.19 m). Her GRT was 9,875, with a NRT of 7,110. Her DWT was 11,975. She was propelled two steam turbines, driving a single screw propeller via double reduction gearing. The turbines were built by Richardsons Westgarth & Co Ltd, Hartlepool and could propel her at 15 knots (28 km/h).

== History ==
Empire Captain was built for the MoWT. She was placed under the management of T & J Harrison Ltd. The Official Number 166217 and Code Letters BFKF were allocated; her port of registry was Dundee. She was a member of a number of convoys during the Second World War.

UC 50A

Convoy UC 50A departed Liverpool on 24 December 1944 bound for New York. Empire Captain was bound for Cape Town, South Africa.

UC 65A

Convoy UC 65 departed St Helens Roads on 23 April 1945 bound for New York. Empire Captain was bound for Cristóbal, Panama.

In 1946, Empire Captain was sold to the Canadian Pacific Railway and renamed Beaverburn, the second Canadian Pacific ship to bear this name. Her port of registry was changed to London. She was placed under the management of Canadian Pacific Steamship Co. In April 1947, Beaverburn was the first ship to reach Montreal once the port had opened after having been closed for the winter by ice. Her captain, John Bisset Smith, received the traditional gold-headed cane for this achievement.

In 1960, Beaverburn was sold to Ben Line Steamers Ltd of Scotland, and renamed SS Bennachie. Her port of registry was changed to Leith.

In 1964, Bennachie was sold to Atlantic Navigation Corporation, Liberia. She was placed under the management of W H Eddie Hsu, Formosa. Silvana served until 1971 when she was sold for scrap. She arrived for scrapping on 6 April 1971 at Kaohsiung, Taiwan.
