= John Ontario Miller =

British civil servant (1857–1943)

Sir John Ontario Miller KCSI (7 August 1857 – 19 January 1943) was a British civil servant in India.

== Early life ==
He was born in Toronto, Canada West, the eldest son of Robert Schaw Miller and his wife Eliza Mitchell, daughter of William Mitchell, founder of the Alloa Coal Company. His father, the son of John Miller of Alloa, emigrated to Canada in 1841, worked in commerce, and died in Montreal in 1862. Miller's younger brother Robert Schaw Miller was born on 3 March 1863. He died in 1928, having been a Writer to the Signet and director of the Alloa Coal Company. Carvel's 1944 book on the Company suggests that another brother, William M. Miller, became a mining engineer.

The Miller family moved to Scotland. Eliza Miller died in mid-1863. John Ontario Miller left notes of his youth, where he described how he associated with "other junior members of the Mitchell family circle". He was educated at the Gymnasium, Old Aberdeen, and King's College, University of Aberdeen.

== Career in India ==
In 1877, Miller qualified by examination for the Indian Civil Service. In 1879 he was posted at Lakhman in the North-Western Provinces. Most of his initial period in India was then spent in the North-Western Provinces.

Miller held various administrative positions from 1895 to 1907. He was Chief Secretary to the North West Provinces and Oudh Administration 1898 to 1902, and was appointed a Companion of the Order of the Star of India (CSI) for his services in the New Year's Honours List 1 January 1901. He served as a Secretary in the Government of India Revenue Department 1902 to 1903. He also was employed as private secretary by the Viceroy Lord Curzon, and acting Viceroy Lord Ampthill. He was then Chief Commissioner of Central Provinces and Berar from 1905 to 1907.

Miller was appointed a member of the Viceroy's Executive Council 1907, resigning in 1910. He was knighted as a Knight Commander of the Order of the Star of India (KCSI) in 1911.

== Later life in England, and family ==
On his final return to Britain, Miller served as a London County Council (Non-Member) representative on the Port of London Authority from 1917 to 1925. He also served as Assistant Secretary in the Ministry of Food, and is named in correspondence for the period 1916–1919. Miller's residences in England included Rowley Lodge, Arkley, 6 Sussex Place, London, and Robson's Orchard, Mid Lavant, Sussex. He died at Lavant.

== Works ==
Miller was interested in the quantity theory of money, and published two pamphlets on economics:

- High prices and the quantity theory of money (1920) Discussing the wartime price of food and the role of the Minister of Food Control in rationing, Miller wrote "Lord Rhondda boldly announced his intention of flouting the ordinary rules of economics, and the result justified his policy, which met with a success unattained in any other country."
- Politicians, Financiers and Currency (1931). "A critical examination of the working of the gold standard internationally and its influence on employment." It was reviewed by Edward Manico Gull.

== Family ==
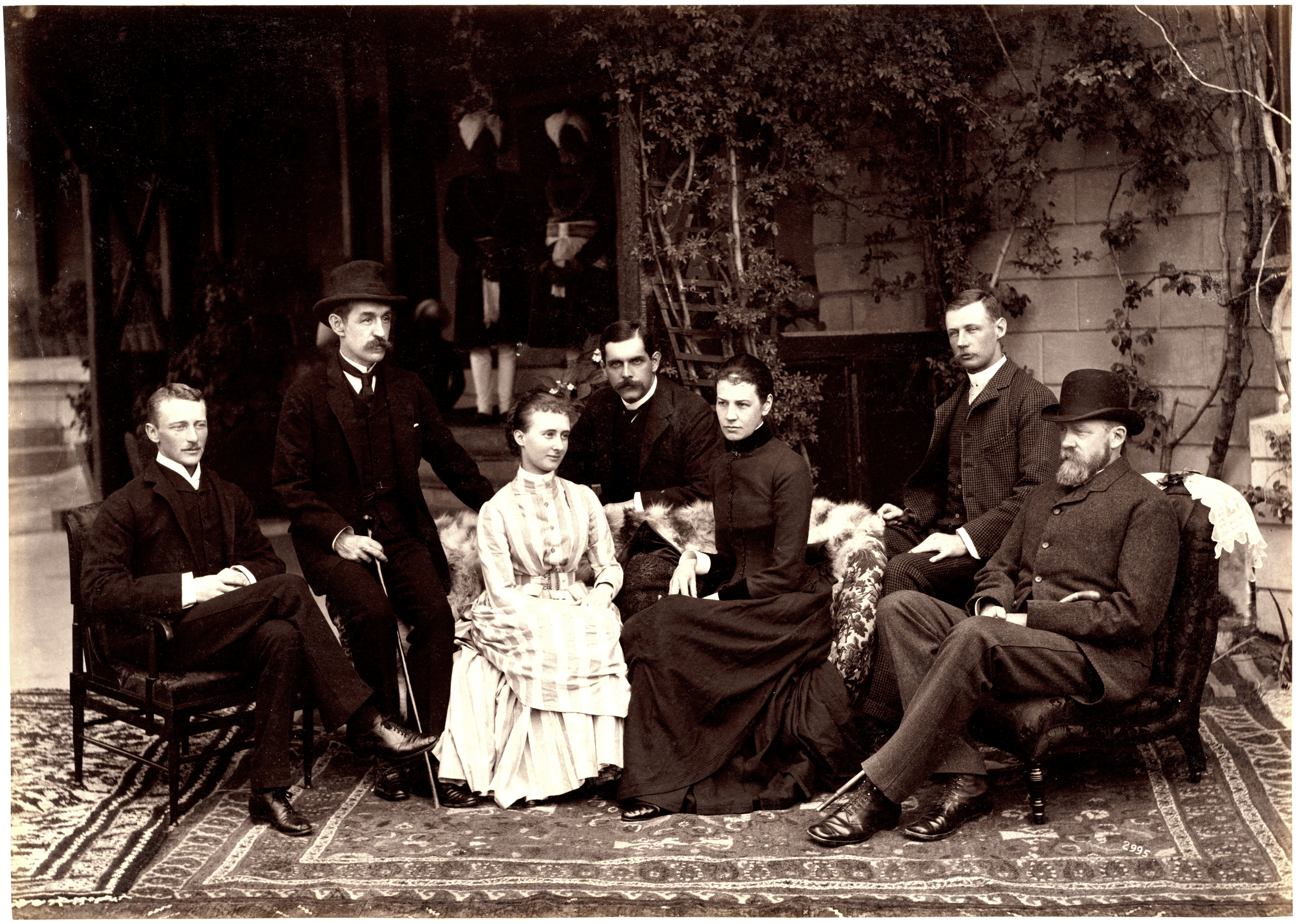
Lyall family group portrait in Shimla, 1887, with Mary Evelyn Lyall in the striped dress

Miller married Mary Evelyn Lyall, daughter of Alfred Comyn Lyall, in 1888. Of their children:

- Godfrey Lyall Miller (1893–1914) was killed at the beginning of World War I.
- Alexander Alfred Lyall RN (born 1894), married in 1918 Evelyn Mary More, daughter of W. H. More of Crown Lodge, Harlech.
- Evelina Catherine (born 1889), married in 1909 Col. Donald Elphinston Robertson, son of Donald Robertson.
- Margaret Magdalen (Peggy) (1897–1938), married the Rev. Leslie Hills, and was mother of Richard L. Hills.
