= Wilmotte =

Wilmotte is a surname. Notable people with the surname include:

- Annick Wilmotte, Belgian Antarctic researcher
- Jean-Michel Wilmotte (born 1948), French architect
- Julia Wilmotte Henshaw (1869–1937), Canadian botanist, geographer, writer, and political activist
