= Walter Grant Morden =

British politician

Member of Parliament for Brentford and Chiswick
- In office 14 December 1918 – 27 October 1931
- Preceded by: Constituency established
- Succeeded by: Sir Harold Mitchell, 1st Baronet

Personal details
- Born: July 20, 1880 Prince Edward County, Ontario
- Died: June 25, 1932 (aged 51)
- Party: Unionist party

Military service
- Allegiance: Canada
- Branch/service: Canadian Army
- Rank: Lieutenant Colonel
- Battles/wars: First World War

Lieutenant Colonel Walter Grant Morden (20 July 1880 – 25 June 1932) was a Canadian-born British Unionist party politician and businessman, who served as Member of Parliament for Brentford and Chiswick from 14 December 1918 - 27 October 1931.

== Early life ==
Morden was born on the 20 July 1880 in Prince Edward County, Ontario, the son of Capt W. H. Morden, of Great Lakes shipping, and Sarah Anne Morden. Morden was educated at Toronto Collegiate Institute and Upper Canada College, followed by the University of Toronto, Harvard University, and the University of Pennsylvania, where he studied law.

== Career ==
During the First World War, he served as a Lieutenant Colonel with the Canadian Expeditionary Force, serving on the Canadian Remount Committee, and as honorary colonel of the 6th Royal Canadian Hussars.

Morden's first business interest was a furniture factory in Farnham, Quebec. He later became involved with finance, moving to England to set up an office in London. Morden built up a large business empire, becoming involved with over 35 companies in the UK, and many others in Canada. Morden was director of the Richelieu and Ontario Navigation Company, the Mexican Mahogany and Rubber Corporation, the New Orleans and Grand Isle Railway Light and Power Co and Pacific Coast Coal Mines, and vice-president of Canada Securities Corporation, Montreal. He co-founded Canada Steamship Lines in 1913, through the merger of 11 smaller companies. He also co-founded the British Commonwealth Union in 1916. Together with Trevor Dawson, managing director of the armaments giant Vickers and a colleague involved with the British Commonwealth Union, Morden was criticised for speculating on the shares of British Celanese, seeking tax breaks and a monopoly over the manufacture of acetate, for the company using undue influence over Reginald McKenna, the Chancellor of the Exchequer and Sam Hughes, the Canadian Minister of Militia and Defence.

Morden was elected MP for Brentford and Chiswick in the 1918 General Election, and was re-elected four times. He stood down at the October 1931 General Election, having been declared bankrupt in April that year. His financial difficulties towards the end of his life were attributed to the decline in share prices during the Great Depression.

== Personal life ==
Morden married Doris Henshaw, the daughter of Julia Wilmotte Henshaw, in Vancouver in 1909, and they had one son and three daughters. The family lived in Heatherden Hall in Buckinghamshire. The negotiations for the ratification of the Anglo-Irish Treaty took place there while Morden was an MP.

Morden died of heart disease on 25 June 1932, aged 51. Heatherden Hall was purchased by Pinewood Studios shortly after his death.

Parliament of the United Kingdom
New constituency	Member of Parliament for Brentford and Chiswick; 1918-1931	Succeeded by Sir Harold Mitchell, 1st Baronet
