= Endstead =

Building in Johannesburg, South Africa

- Interactive map of the Endstead area

General information
- Location: Parktown, Johannesburg, South Africa
- Coordinates: 26°10′41″S 28°01′27″E
- Construction started: 1903; 123 years ago

Endstead is a historic house in Parktown, Johannesburg, South Africa built in 1903 by Ernest Willmot Sloper for his own use.

The original property has been sub-divided; the only major changes to the house have been the addition of a double garage by Tony Bentel, an enlarged kitchen 1920 by Solomon and Marshall, a garage by Marshall and Fleming that replaced the stables in 1923 and a swimming pool plus pool change rooms.

== Description ==
Enstead was built with local materials: koppie stone and timber shingles. The house has panoramic views across the ridge, and the property was integrated into the ridge landscape with a terraced garden showcasing indigenous shrubs and plants. The rooms are spacious and well lit by natural daylight.

Timber panelling, doors and fitted furniture inside the house have pegged joints. Many original features of the interior are intact and the terraced garden has been retained as an indigenous garden.

== Heritage status ==
Enstead was nominated as a Heritage site by the Johannesburg Heritage Foundation and was awarded heritage status by Provincial Heritage Resources Authority Gauteng in February 2016. Endstead is described as having:

- high aesthetic value
- high historical value
- high associative value, being associated with architect Ernest Sloper, and the architectural practice of Baker, Masey & Sloper
- high degree of intactness both to the exterior and interior, which is rare in houses over 100 years old
- fine example of an Arts & Crafts style house from the early 1900s
