= Annick Wilmotte =

Belgian microbiologist

Annick Willmotte
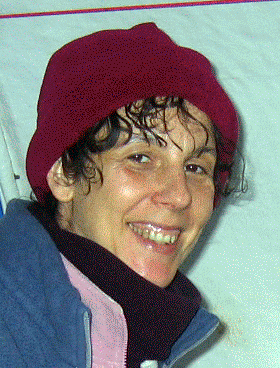
- Education: University of Liège
- Scientific career
- Fields: Polar microbiology
- Workplaces: University of Liège

Annick Wilmotte is a Belgian Antarctic researcher best known for her research on the diversity and ecology of Antarctic cyanobacterial microflora. A genus of Antarctic cyanobacteria called Wilmottia was named after her in recognition of her work in this field.

== Early life and education ==
Wilmotte completed her MSc in Botanical Sciences) at the University of Liège in 1982. Her thesis investigated the use of epiphytic marine cyanobacteria as indicators of pollution of Calvi Bay, Corsica, France. She subsequently completed her PhD in Botanical Sciences at the University of Liège. The title of her thesis was "Contribution to the taxonomic and ecological characterisation of marine epiphytic Oscillatoriaceae (Cyanophyceae) of the experimental cultivation and nucleic acid studies".

== Career and impact ==
Wilmotte, currently Research Associate at the FRS-FNRS, working at the University of Liège, has recognized research experience in the isolation, cultivation, and characterisation of cyanobacteria by phenotypic and genotypic methods, has contributed to the molecular taxonomy of cyanobacteria and has highlighted the importance of Antarctic microbial diversity. Her polar work concerns the microscopic and genotypic diversity of cyanobacteria in Antarctic microbial mats (MICROMAT, LAQUAN, AMBIO) and the use of fossil DNA for cyanobacterial paleodiversity reconstruction (HOLANT).

Willmotte is coordinating the BELSPO project CCAMBIO, using high-throughput methodologies to investigate the microbial biodiversity and biogeography in lacustrine benthic mats at the scale of the Antarctic continent. She also was involved in the study of the diversity of picoplanktonic cyanobacteria in the Southern Ocean and Arctic Sea.

Since 2011, she has been the promoter and curator of the BCCM/ULC public collection of cyanobacteria, a dedicated public collection, currently containing one of the largest collections of documented subpolar cyanobacteria worldwide. The collection accepts deposits of polar cyanobacteria and allows their distribution to scientists and industries, for further research.

Wilmotte has been the Belgian delegate to the Committee for Environmental Protection at the Consultative Meeting of the Antarctic Treaty since 2008. She is also Secretary of the Belgian National Committee on Antarctic Research of the Royal Academy of Belgium and a Belgian delegate to the Standing Scientific Group- Life Sciences of the Scientific Committee on Antarctic Research since 2012.

== Scientific outreach ==
Wilmotte is recognised for her work in scientific outreach on the Antarctic Treaty and also on the importance of Antarctic microorganisms.

== Awards and honours ==
A new cyanobacterial genus (Wilmottia) originally described from Antarctica was dedicated to her by colleagues. She was awarded the l'Adjudant Lefévre of the Sciences of the Royal Academy of Belgium in 1999.
