= Mitchell baronets =

Set index for Mitchell baronets

There have been two Baronetcies created for persons with the surname Mitchell, one in the Baronetage of Great Britain and one in the Baronetage of the United Kingdom. Both are extinct.

- Mitchell baronets of West Shore (1724)
- Mitchell baronets of Tulliallan and Luscar (1945): see Sir Harold Paton Mitchell, 1st Baronet (1900–1983)

== See also ==
- Cotts baronets, now Mitchell Cotts baronets
- Baron Selsdon, now subsuming Mitchell-Thomson baronets of Polmood (1900)
