= Wilmot Township =

Wilmot Township may refer to the following places:

== Australia ==
- Wilmot, Tasmania (a township)

== Canada ==
- Wilmot Township, Ontario
- Wilmot, Nova Scotia (formerly Wilmot Township, Nova Scotia)

== United States ==
- Wilmot Township, Ashley County, Arkansas
- Wilmot Township, Michigan
- Wilmot Township, Bradford County, Pennsylvania

== See also ==
- Wilmot (disambiguation)
- Wilmont Township, Nobles County, Minnesota
