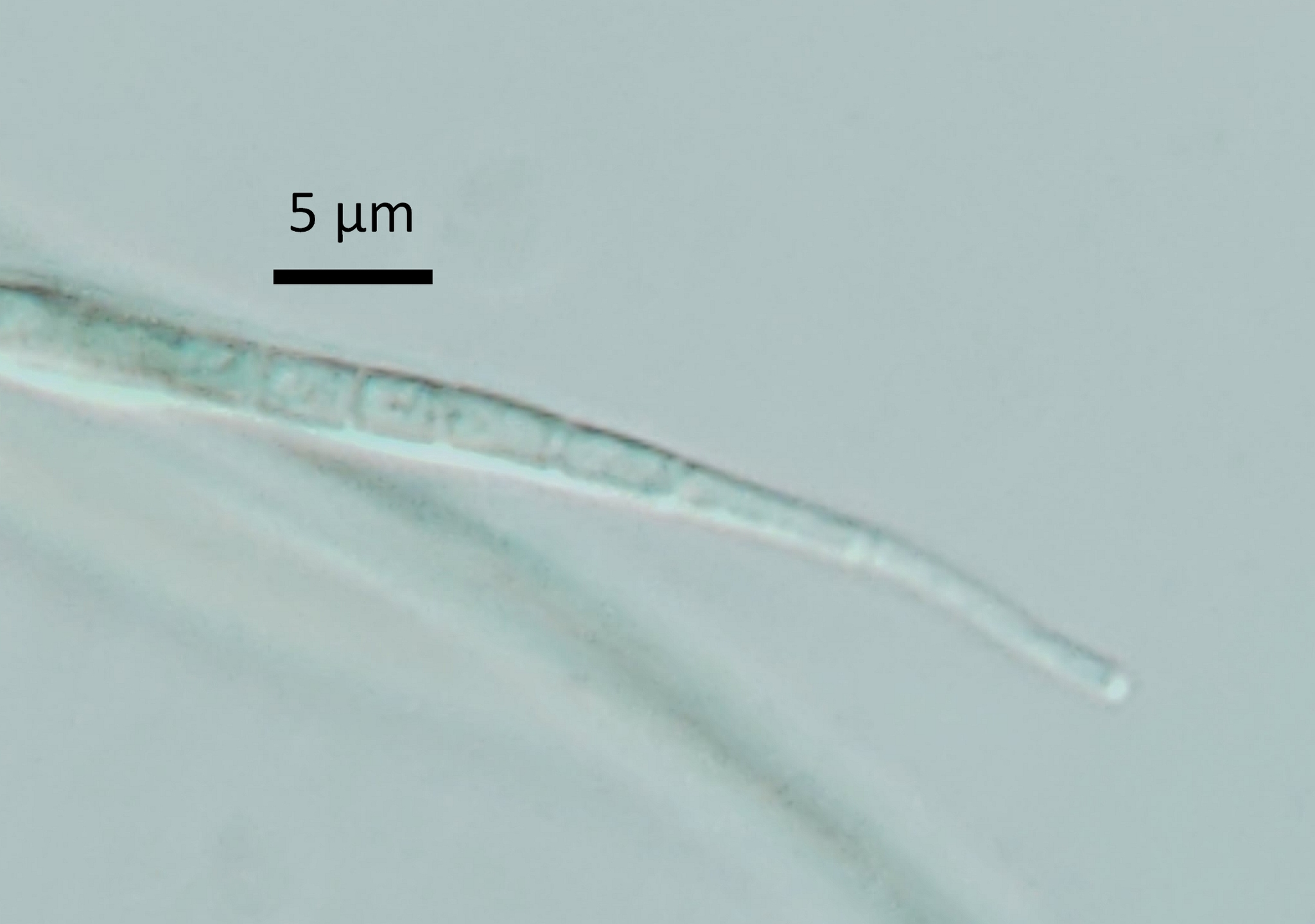
- Geitlerinema acutissimum

Scientific classification
- Domain: Bacteria
- Kingdom: Bacillati
- Phylum: Cyanobacteriota
- Class: Cyanophyceae
- Order: Oscillatoriales
- Family: Coleofasciculaceae
- Genus: Geitlerinema (Anagnostidis & Komárek) Anagnostidis

= Geitlerinema =

Genus of cyanobacteria

Geitlerinema is a genus of cyanobacteria belonging to the family Coleofasciculaceae.

The genus was first described by K. Anagnostidis in 1989. The genus name of Geitlerinema is in honour of Lothar Geitler (1899 – 1990), who was an Austrian botanist and cytologist.

The genus has cosmopolitan distribution.

Species:

- Geitlerinema amphibium
- Geitlerinema splendidum
