= Lothar Geitler =

Austrian botanist and cytologist

Lothar Geitler (18 May 1899 – 1 May 1990) was an Austrian botanist and cytologist. He was born in Vienna. His main research interests included blue-green algae (Cyanophyta), diatoms, lichen symbioses and chromosome structure.

The cyanobacteria genus Geitlerinema was named in his honour in 1989.
