= Willmott =

Willmott is a surname. It may refer to:

- The Willmott family of British Olympic swimmers, including:
  - Aimee Willmott (born 1993)
  - Carrie Willmott (born 1975)
  - Jacquelene Willmott (born 1965)
  - Stuart Willmott (born 1964)
- Chris Willmott (born 1977), English footballer
- Deidre Willmott (born ?), Australian lawyer and public servant
- Ellen Willmott (1858–1934), English horticulturist
- Ernest Willmot Sloper (born Ernest Willmott; 1871–1916), British-born South African architect
- Francis Willmott (1870–1941), British-born Australian politician and farmer
- Francis Drake Willmott (1904–2004), Australian politician and farmer
- Glenis Willmott (born 1951), English politician
- Harold Willmott (1899–1993), South African military commander
- Hugh Willmott (born 1950), British academic
- Hugh Willmott (archaeologist) (born 1972), British archaeologist and academic
- Kevin Willmott (born 1959), American film director, screenwriter, and professor
- Leonard Willmott (1921–1993), British soldier of World War II
- Maurice Willmott (1894–1977) British High Court judge
- Peter Willmott (businessman) (born ?), American business executive
- Peter Willmott (sociologist) (1923–2000), British sociologist
- Phil Willmott (born 1968), British director, playwright, arts journalist, and teacher
- Robbie Willmott (born 1990), English footballer
- Robert Aris Willmott (1809–1863), English cleric and author
- Tom Willmott (born 1960), American politician, attorney, and registered nurse
- Trevor Willmott (born 1950), British Anglican bishop
- William Willmott (1895–1947), Australian politician

== See also ==
- James Willmott-Brown, a fictional character in the soap opera EastEnders
- Wilmot (surname)
