= Michael Barnes (British politician) =

British Labour politician, marketing consultant and senior public official

Michael Cecil John Barnes CBE (22 September 1932 – 22 March 2018) was a British Labour Party politician, marketing consultant and senior public official.

Barnes was born in Painswick, Gloucestershire to Major Cecil Barnes and Katherine Barnes. He studied at Malvern School before completing national service as a second lieutenant in the Wiltshire Regiment. He then went on to university, where he read Classics at Corpus Christi College, Oxford and joined the Labour Party in his final year. After graduating, Barnes worked for advertising agencies for several years.

Barnes entered politics at the age of 32. Having unsuccessfully fought Wycombe in 1964, he was member of parliament for Brentford and Chiswick in 1966. As an MP, he argued in support for refugees from the Biafran Civil War and for Bangladesh in its fight for independence. Barnes also voted in favour of the UK joining the EEC, rebelling against a Labour three line whip.

Barnes remained an MP until 1974, when the Brentford and Chiswick seat was abolished in boundary changes. At the February 1974 general election, he stood in the new Brentford and Isleworth constituency against the Conservative MP Barney Hayhoe, whose own Heston and Isleworth constituency had also been abolished. Hayhoe won by 726 votes. Afterwards, Barnes became a founding member of the Social Democratic Party, before returning to the Labour Party two years later.

Between 1990 and 1996 Barnes served as Legal Services Ombudsman. Between 2002 and 2010, he served as the Independent Assessor of the Financial Ombudsman Service. He was appointed CBE in the 1998 New Year Honours. Barnes also worked part-time for the Gulbenkian Foundation.

Barnes died in March 2018 at the age of 85, survived by his wife Anne and two children, Hugh and Kate.

== Notes ==
Parliament of the United Kingdom
Preceded by Dudley Smith	Member of Parliament for Brentford and Chiswick; 1966–Feb 1974	Succeeded by (constituency abolished)
