= Ernest Willmot Sloper =

British architect (1871–1916)

Ernest Willmot Sloper (1871 – 12 June 1916) was an architect active in Johannesburg, South Africa and in the United Kingdom. He designed Bishopskop for Michael Furse, bishop of Pretoria. He also designed his own house in Parktown, Endstead.

== Early life ==
At birth, Sloper was named Ernest Willmott but changed his name to Ernest Sloper before he left Britain for in South Africa in 1902. He was born in Britain and received his schooling at Queen's College, Taunton, Somerset. He studied art part time at the Taunton Art School while working for an architect named Roberts in Taunton. At around about this time he worked on the Great Western Railway as a resident engineer responsible for the Kingsbridge branch line in Devon. While working in Devon he met with GF Bodley, an architect. Willmott then began working in the London offices of the architectural practice of Bodley & Garner. With Garner he designed the Empire Hotel, Buxton.

== South Africa ==
In 1902 Sloper moved to South Africa where he joined Herbert Baker's office in Cape Town. Later in 1902 Baker and Sloper relocated to Johannesburg. In 1903 Sloper joined the practice of Baker & Massey as a partner and the firm was named Baker, Masey & Sloper. Baker valued Sloper's contribution to the firm noting '[Sloper] showed great gifts in educating builders and craftsmen to better methods of building and the use of local materials. The excellence of the walling built of koppie stone was largely due to his perseverance and encouragement to the masons'.

Sloper paid great attention to the setting of the house in the garden; this is best seen in Howard Pim's house Timewell where terraces were created using koppie-stone retaining walls. These terraces were planted with indigenous shrubs. Joane Pim, the daughter of Howard Pim, who became a well-known gardener designer in Johannesburg, would have been influenced by growing up in the garden designed by Sloper.

Sloper was credited by Professor Geoffrey Eastcott Pearse with starting architectural education in the Transvaal. In 1903 Sloper began giving classes at the School of Mines and Technology in Johannesburg in architectural design. Pearse was one of the first six pupils in those classes.

== Works ==
=== Buildings ===
His works include:

- St George's Church, Parktown
- House at Kensington for J. Brown, Esq.
- House at Riviera for Douglas Pennant, Esq.
- Bishopskop for Michael Furse, the bishop of Pretoria
- House at Parktown for Richard Feetham, town clerk Johannesburg
- Timewell at Parktown for Howard Pim, deputy mayor of Johannesburg
- Government House, Pretoria
- Government Buildings, Bloemfontein
- Westminster Estate, Orange Free State for the Duke of Westminster
- St John The Divine Anglican Church, 5 Benson Street, West Porges, Randfontein.
- A church at Krugersdorp
- Houses at Pretoria for
  - Sir Arthur Weir Mason, Judge of the Transvaal Supreme Court
  - Sir William Henry Solomon, Judge of the Transvaal Supreme Court
  - Sir James Rose Innes, Judge of the Transvaal Supreme Court
  - G. F. C. Dent, Esq.
- Roedean School, Parktown
- House at Inanda for W. Wyberg, Esq.
- His own house, Endstead, at Parktown.

=== Books ===
- Willmott, Ernest (1911). English House Design, a Review: Being a Selection and Brief Analysis of Some of the Best Achievements in English Domestic Architecture from the 16th to the 20th Centuries, Together with Numerous Examples of Contemporary Design. B.T. Batsford.

== See also ==
- Moses Tladi
