= Wilmot (given name) =

Wilmot is a masculine and feminine given name. It may refer to:

- Wilmot Hyde Bradley (1899–1979), American geologist
- Wilmot Brookings (1830–1905), American pioneer, frontier judge, early South Dakotan politician and provisional governor of the Dakota Territory
- Wilmot Arthur de Silva (1869-1942), Sri Lankan Sinhala veterinary surgeon, politician, and philanthropist
- Wilmot Fawkes (1846–1926), Royal Navy admiral
- Wilmot Fleming (1916-1978), American politician
- Wilmot Hudson Fysh (1895–1974), Australian aviator and businessman, a co-founder of Australian airline Qantas
- Wilmot James (born 5 1953), South African academic-turned-politician
- Wilmot A. Perera (1905–1973), Sri Lankan politician and philanthropist
- Wilmot Perkins (1931–2012), Jamaican radio personality and talk show host
- Wilmot Redd (early 17th century-1692), one of the victims of the Salem witch trials
- Wilmot Moses Smith (1852–1906), American lawyer, jurist and songwriter
- Wilmot Vaughan, 3rd Viscount Lisburne (died 1766), Welsh landowner and Irish peer
- Wilmot Vaughan, 1st Earl of Lisburne (1728–1800), Welsh peer and politician, son of the above
- Wilmot Vaughan, 2nd Earl of Lisburne (1755–1820), Welsh landowner and Irish peer, son of the above
- Wilmot Vyvyan (1861–1937), Anglican Bishop of Zululand
