= Brentford and Chiswick (constituency) =

Former parliamentary constituency in the United Kingdom

- Former borough constituency for the House of Commons

1950–February 1974
- Seats: one
- Replaced by: Brentford and Isleworth (newly created seat) (to form eastern part of)

1918–1950
- Seats: one
- Type of constituency: County constituency
- Created from: Brentford
- Replaced by: Brentford and Chiswick borough constituency, above

Brentford and Chiswick was a constituency (Note: A borough constituency (for the purposes of election expenses and type of returning officer)) from 1918 to 1974 centred on the Brentford and Chiswick districts of Middlesex which became parts of west London in 1965. It returned one member (MP) to the House of Commons of the UK Parliament.

Its electoral outcomes were Conservative except for siding with the Labour Party's victories which returned the Attlee Ministry (in 1945) and Second Wilson Ministry (in 1966).

== Boundaries ==
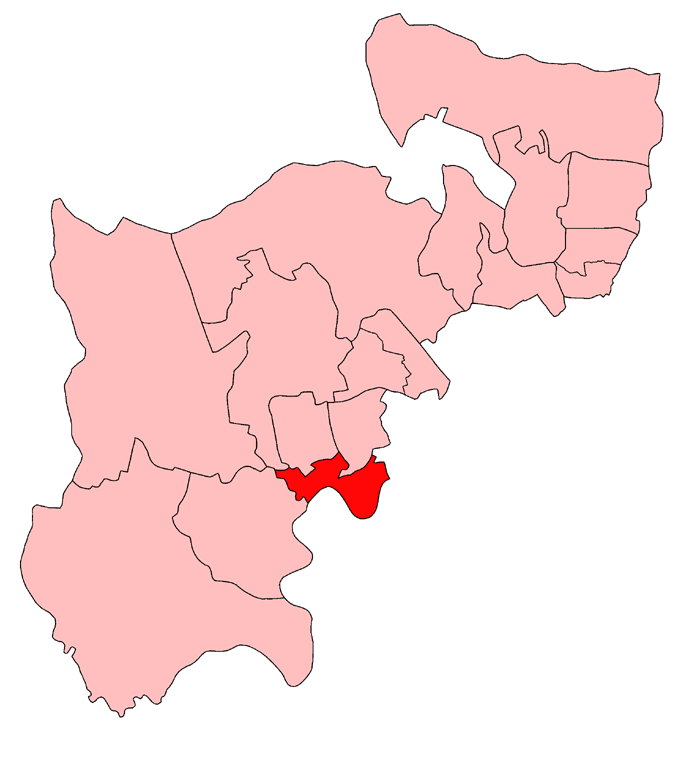
Brentford and Chiswick in Middlesex 1918–45

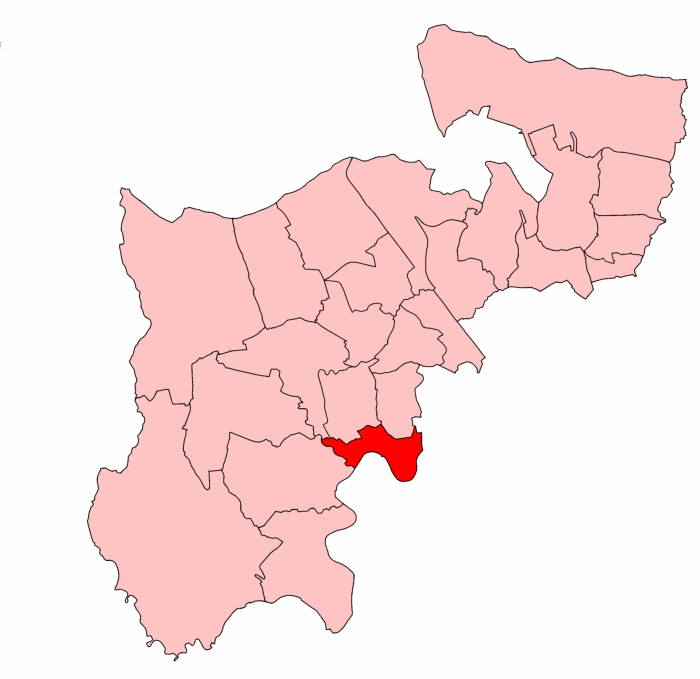
Brentford and Chiswick was almost unchanged in a more developed subdivided county from 1945 to 1950

Brentford and Chiswick in Middlesex 1950–74

This former constituency is toward the south-west of the historic county of Middlesex, in what is since 1965 west London. It was established as a division of the county of Middlesex, named after the towns of Brentford and Chiswick. In the 1885–1918 distribution of parliamentary seats it had been the eastern part of the Brentford division.

In 1918 the constituency comprised the Brentford and the Chiswick Urban Districts. In 1927 the two districts were combined to form a single Brentford and Chiswick Urban District, which in 1932 became the Municipal Borough of Brentford and Chiswick. In 1950 the boundaries of the seat were left unchanged, but it was reclassified as a borough constituency.

In 1965 Brentford and Chiswick became part of the London Borough of Hounslow and Greater London.

The seat rapidly became under-sized in electorate, see malapportionment – the area forming the seat was unusually declining in population, with in the 1918 to 1930 period the major loss of servants and lodgers among many of the larger houses particularly in Chiswick, and areas of reduction of overly dense housing in Brentford. Little space remained in the seat for new building compared with other seats to the west and north. The rest of the county saw major population growth. One key area of growth in this seat was instead in the number of commercial plants, yards and offices adjoining the 'Golden Mile', Brentford.

In the redistribution of parliamentary seats, which took effect at the February 1974 general election, this seat was replaced by Brentford and Isleworth which took in the eastern half of abolished Heston and Isleworth.

== Members of Parliament ==
Year	Member	Party
1918	Walter Morden	Coalition Conservative
1922	Walter Morden	Conservative
1931	Harold Mitchell	Conservative
1945	Francis Noel-Baker	Labour
1950	Percy Lucas	Conservative
1959	Dudley Smith	Conservative
1966	Michael Barnes	Labour
Feb 1974	constituency abolished: see Brentford & Isleworth	

== Election results ==
=== Elections in the 1910s ===
General election 1918: Brentford & Chiswick
Party		Candidate	Votes	%	±%
C	Unionist	Walter Grant Morden	9,077	70.04	
	Labour	William Haywood	2,620	20.22	
	Independent	Ray Strachey	1,263	9.75	
Majority			6,457	49.82	
Turnout			12,960		
	Unionist win (new seat)				
C indicates candidate endorsed by the coalition government.

=== Elections in the 1920s ===
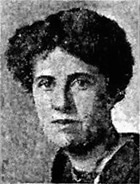
Strachey

General election 1922: Brentford & Chiswick
Party	Candidate	Votes	%	±%
Unionist	Walter Grant Morden	10,150	56.5	−13.5
Independent	Ray Strachey	7,804	43.5	+33.8
Majority		2,346	13.0	−36.8
Turnout		17,954	64.2	+14.2
Registered electors		27,960		
Unionist hold		Swing	−23.7	

General election 1923: Brentford & Chiswick
Party	Candidate	Votes	%	±%
Unionist	Walter Grant Morden	9,648	54.5	−2.0
Independent	Ray Strachey	4,828	27.3	−16.2
Labour	William Haywood	3,216	18.2	New
Majority		4,820	27.2	+14.2
Turnout		17,692	62.6	−1.6
Registered electors		28,245		
Unionist hold		Swing	+7.1	

General election 1924: Brentford & Chiswick
Party	Candidate	Votes	%	±%
Unionist	Walter Grant Morden	12,098	58.3	+3.8
Labour	William Haywood	6,114	29.5	+11.3
Liberal	J. C. Squire	2,540	12.2	New
Majority		5,984	28.8	+1.6
Turnout		20,752	72.5	+9.9
Registered electors		28,606		
Unionist hold		Swing	−3.8	

General election 1929: Brentford and Chiswick
Party	Candidate	Votes	%	±%
Unionist	Walter Grant Morden	14,025	48.4	−9.9
Labour	Stella Churchill	10,978	37.9	+8.4
Liberal	John Stevenson	3,957	13.7	+1.5
Majority		3,047	10.5	−18.3
Turnout		28,960	72.2	−0.3
Registered electors		40,088		
Unionist hold		Swing	−9.2	

=== Elections in the 1930s ===
General election 1931: Brentford and Chiswick
Party	Candidate	Votes	%	±%
Conservative	Harold Mitchell	22,667	74.96	+26.43
Labour	George Catlin	7,572	25.04	−12.74
Majority		15,095	49.92	+39.17
Turnout		30,239	71.82	
Conservative hold		Swing	+19.59	

General election 1935: Brentford and Chiswick
Party	Candidate	Votes	%	±%
Conservative	Harold Mitchell	17,568	65.40	−9.56
Labour	Frederick Wilson Temple	9,296	34.60	+9.56
Majority		8,272	30.80	−19.12
Turnout		26,864	64.19	
Conservative hold		Swing		

=== Elections in the 1940s ===
General election 1945: Brentford and Chiswick
Party	Candidate	Votes	%	±%
Labour	Francis Noel-Baker	17,693	57.63	+23.03
Conservative	Harold Mitchell	13,006	42.37	−23.03
Majority		4,687	15.26	N/A
Turnout		30,699	75.87	+11.68
Labour gain from Conservative		Swing	+23.03	

=== Elections in the 1950s ===
General election 1950: Brentford and Chiswick
Party	Candidate	Votes	%	±%
Conservative	Laddie Lucas	18,408	47.88	+5.51
Labour	Francis Noel-Baker	17,551	45.65	−11.98
Liberal	Denis Faulkner Horne	2,086	5.43	+5.43
Communist	J Parker	401	1.04	New
Majority		857	2.23	N/A
Turnout		38,446	87.67	+11.80
Conservative gain from Labour		Swing	+8.75	

General election 1951: Brentford and Chiswick
Party	Candidate	Votes	%	±%
Conservative	Laddie Lucas	19,612	52.00	+4.12
Labour	Leonard Lewis	18,102	48.00	+2.35
Majority		1,510	4.00	+1.77
Turnout		37,714	86.19	−1.48
Conservative hold		Swing	+0.89	

General election 1955: Brentford and Chiswick
Party	Candidate	Votes	%	±%
Conservative	Laddie Lucas	18,489	53.02	+1.02
Labour	Alexander Warnock Filson	16,384	46.98	−1.02
Majority		2,105	6.04	+2.04
Turnout		34,873	82.00	−4.19
Conservative hold		Swing	+1.02	

General election 1959: Brentford and Chiswick
Party	Candidate	Votes	%	±%
Conservative	Dudley Smith	17,869	54.45	+1.43
Labour	Hugh Bruce Oliphant Cardew	14,950	45.55	−1.43
Majority		2,919	8.90	+2.86
Turnout		32,819	82.29	+0.29
Conservative hold		Swing	+1.43	

=== Elections in the 1960s ===
General election 1964: Brentford and Chiswick
Party	Candidate	Votes	%	±%
Conservative	Dudley Smith	14,019	46.05	−8.40
Labour	David W. Chalkley	13,475	44.26	−1.29
Liberal	Meurig D Jones	2,951	9.69	New
Majority		544	1.79	−7.10
Turnout		30,445	79.15	−3.14
Conservative hold		Swing	+3.56	

General election 1966: Brentford and Chiswick
Party	Candidate	Votes	%	±%
Labour	Michael Barnes	14,638	47.63	+3.37
Conservative	Dudley Smith	14,031	45.66	−0.39
Liberal	Geoffrey Roy King	2,063	6.71	−2.98
Majority		607	1.97	N/A
Turnout		30,732	82.05	+2.9
Labour gain from Conservative		Swing	+1.88	

=== Elections in the 1970s ===
General election 1970: Brentford and Chiswick
Party	Candidate	Votes	%	±%
Labour	Michael Barnes	14,051	50.9	+3.3
Conservative	Oliver C Wright	13,538	49.1	+3.4
Majority		513	1.8	−0.2
Turnout		27,589	73.2	−8.8
Labour hold		Swing	−0.1	
