= William Mitchell (Scottish entrepreneur) =

British entrepreneur

William Mitchell (16 March 1781 – 17 February 1854) was a British entrepreneur. He was born in Alloa, Clackmannanshire, the second son of Alexander Mitchell and Janet Barrowman.

He was a co-founder of the Alloa Coal Company later run by his sons Andrew and Alexander. He was an important investor (along with other members of his family) in the Leith shipping line William Thomson and Co.; better known as the Ben Line. In the 1840s, the Ben Line was in the North Atlantic trade, taking Alloa coal to Canada and returning with timber.

Mitchell's more famous grandsons include the British civil servant in India John Ontario Miller (1857–1843), the founder of the Luscar Coal Company Colonel Alexander Mitchell (1871–1934), Sir Mitchell Mitchell-Thomson (1846–1918) a Lord Provost of Edinburgh, the Auditor-General of Tasmania Duncan Charles Mitchell (1859–1925) and the explorer and Humanities scholar William Mitchell Ramsay (1851–1939).
