= Moses Tladi =

South African artist

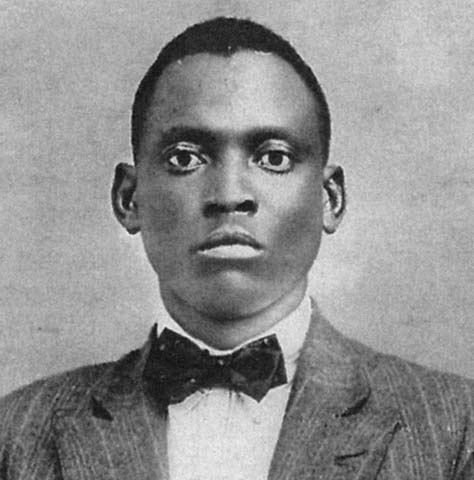
- Born: 1897; Lobethal, GaPhahla
- Died: 1959 (aged 56); Soweto, South Africa
- Known for: Landscape painting

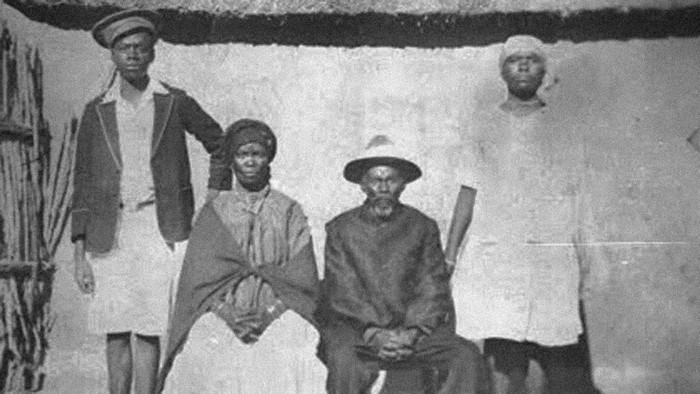
Parents of Moses Tladi

Moses Tladi (1897–1959) was a self-taught artist who was the first black painter to hold a formal exhibition in South Africa and the first black artist to exhibit at the South African National Gallery.

== Early life ==
Moses Tladi was born and brought up in 1903 Lobethal, GaPhahla, in the northern part of South Africa. He was the son of a traditional healer who made a living by working creatively in iron, and a mother who was a gifted potter. Tladi spent his early years herding cattle. His parents converted to Christianity under the influence of the Berlin Missionary Society, and he was educated at the Lobethal Mission in the now Limpopo Province. Tladi, like many young men of the time, went to Johannesburg in search of work. By the mid-1920s, he found employment as gardener at Lokshoek, the home of mining company employee, Herbert Read in the fashionable suburb of Parktown.

== Career as an artist ==
Tladi started painting with leftover commercial house paint and a stick. His talent for painting was noticed by his employer, Read who started providing him with artists' materials. Read also introduced Tladi to the collector and philanthropist Howard Pim, who was once a mayor of Johannesburg, and played a leading role in the establishment of the Johannesburg Art Gallery. Both Read and Pim promoted Tladi at public exhibitions from 1929 onwards. In 1931 Tladi became the first black artist to exhibit at the South African National Gallery. In 1939, he was the first Black African Artist to have his works exhibited at the National Gallery in Johannesburg, where his paintings received acclaim.

Tladi served his country during the Second World War, and continued to paint until 1956, when he was forced to move out of his own home in the Johannesburg suburb of Kensington B to Soweto as a result of the National Party's Apartheid policies, specifically the Group Areas Act. He died in 1959, at the age of 56.

== Moses Tladi Unearthed ==
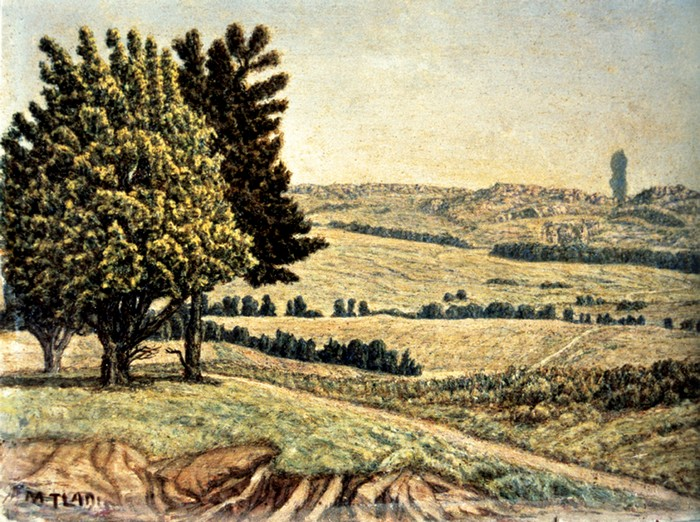
Moses Tladi Paintings- The House in Kensington B

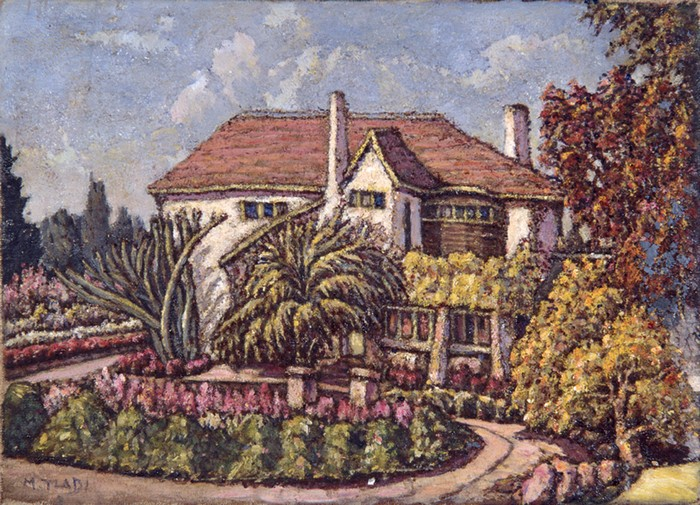
Moses Tladi Paintings - Lokshoek Johannesburg

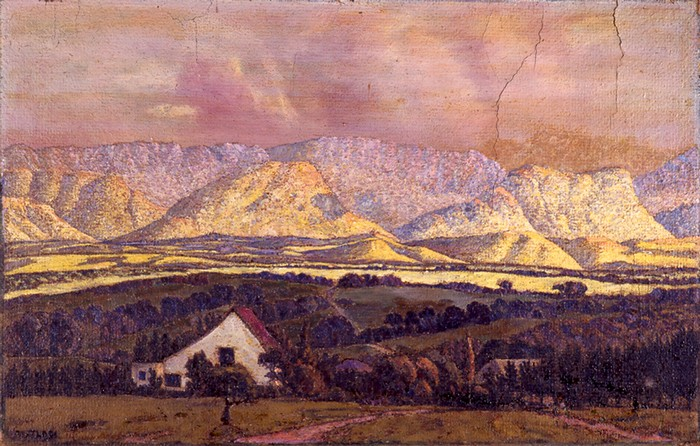
Moses Tladi Paintings - Morning at Magaliesberg Mountains

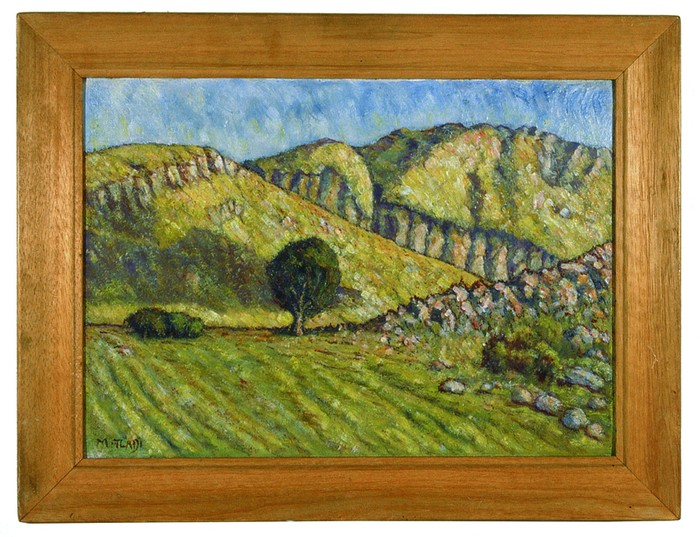
Moses Tladi Paintings - Manako Sekhukuniland

The first major South African exhibition of the work of artist, Moses Tladi, opened at the Iziko South African National Gallery in Cape Town on Heritage Day, 24 September 2015. The exhibition entitled Moses Tladi Unearthed, provided the visitor with an exceptional opportunity to view his work. Cited as the first black artist to have exhibited formally in South Africa, Moses Tladi (1903–1959) developed a reputation as a realist landscape painter.

During his lifetime, he was the first black artist to exhibit at the Iziko South African National Gallery, soon after the present building was opened, first in 1931 and then in 1933. More than half a century after his death in 1959, this exhibition brings back into public view the significance of his work. The exhibition was moved to Grahamstown in June 2016 to be part of the National Arts Festival. The exhibition features approximately 30 Tladi paintings, sourced from institutional and personal collections in South Africa and overseas. An “in context” approach showcasing other artists who worked in a similar vein, or at the same time, are also included.
