= Alloa Coal Company =

- Company type: Private partnership (1835–1898), Limited company (1898–1948)
- Industry: Mining
- Founded: 1835
- Founder: William Mitchell, John Moubray, John Craich, David Ramsay
- Defunct: 1948 (nationalized)
- Area served: Clackmannanshire, Stirlingshire, Fife, Perthshire
- Key people: Andrew Mitchell, Alexander Mitchell
- Products: Coal, Ironstone

The Alloa Coal Company was founded in 1835 as a partnership between William Mitchell, John Moubray, John Craich, and David Ramsay. The partners obtained a lease to mine coal and ironstone on the lands of the Earl of Mar in Clackmannanshire. In the 1840s, Alloa coal was exported to Canada by the Ben Line in which Mitchell was a partner; the ships returned with Canadian timber.

The partnership was later managed by William Mitchell's sons Andrew and Alexander and had pits in Clackmannanshire, Stirlingshire, Fife and Perthshire. The partnership became a limited company in 1898, and was nationalised by the British Government in 1948.

Mines and pits operated by the Alloa Coal Company Ltd. included Zetland and Craigrie Collieries near Clackmannan, Devon Colliery and Meta Colliery, near Fishcross, King o'Muirs Colliery near Tullibody, Tillicoultry Colliery. at Devonside, and Dollar Colliery (West Pitgober Mine) east of Dollar village. Dollar Mine, as it was known under National Coal Board management, was the last survivor, continuing to supply coal by rail to Kincardine Power Station until 1973.

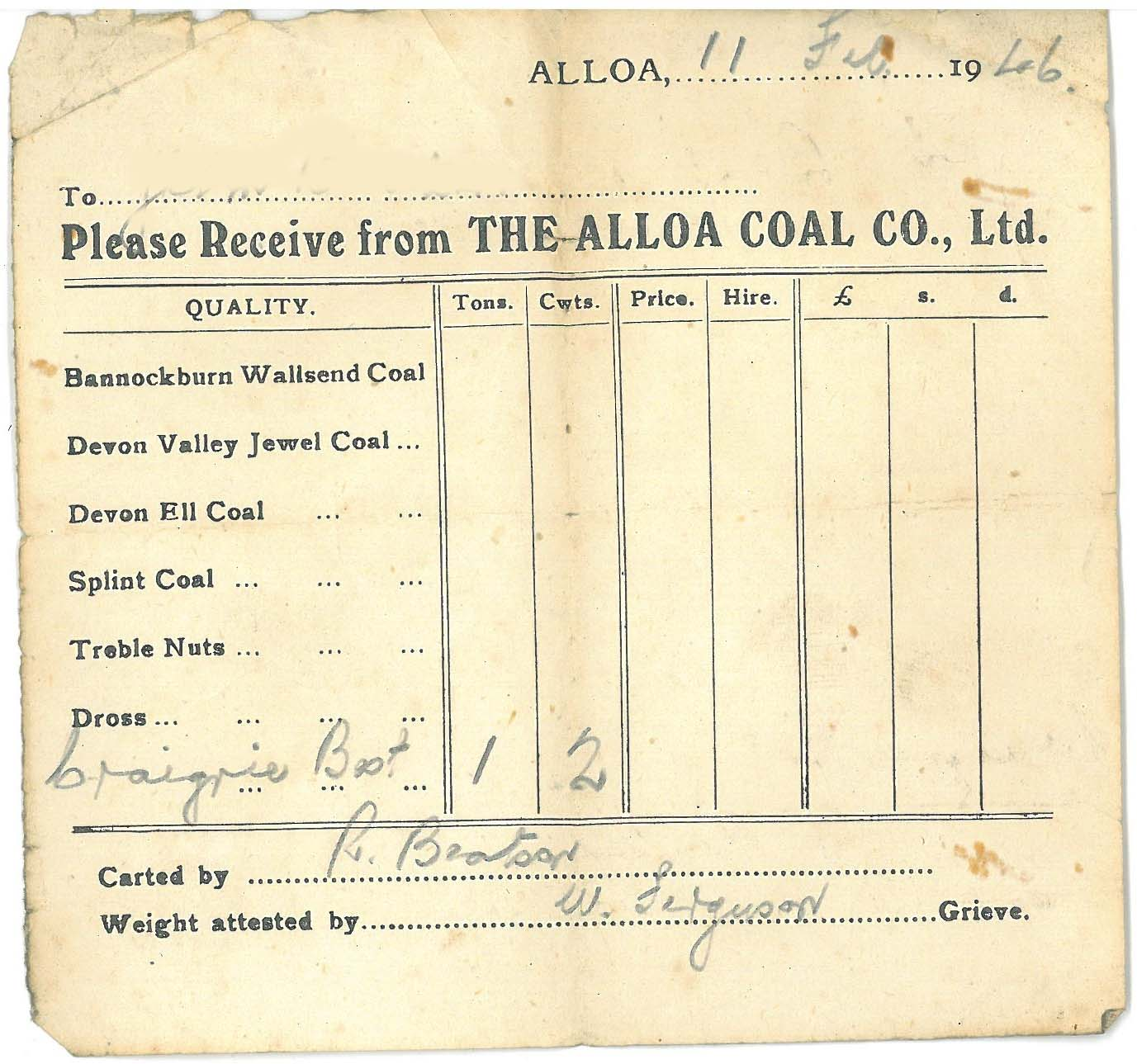
Delivery Note for Craigrie Best

Bannockburn Colliery at Cowie (Stirlingshire) lay outside the Company's Clackmannanshire roots, and was formerly owned by Carron Company (ironworkers), presumably for assuring a supply of coking coal for their cupolas at Carron Works near Falkirk, although the mine also produced house coal and steam coal. This colliery had a later lease of life as a drift mine between 1953 and 1964.

Before the advent of the railways, coal was transported from various of the Clackmannanshire mines to the Port and Glassworks in Alloa by the Wagon Way. Constructed by the Erskines of Mar in 1768, the Wagon Way was an early attempt at railway engineering using horse-drawn wagons running on wooden rails, later replaced by Swedish iron in 1785.
