= Peter Willmott (businessman) =

American businessman

Peter Willmott (June 1, 1937 – November 11, 2023) was an American businessman. He worked for several large American companies, including as an executive at Federal Express from 1974 to 1983, and as Chief Executive Officer and President of Carson Pirie Scott & Co. from 1996 to 1998.

== Early life and education ==
Willmott was born on June 1, 1937. Willmott graduated from Williams College in 1959 with a degree in economics. At Williams, he was, amongst various activities, captain of the basketball team. He went on to attend Harvard's Business School and graduated with a Masters of Business Administration in 1961.

== Career ==
After graduation, Willmott began working as a financial analyst for American Airlines, and then worked as a consultant for Booz, Allen & Hamilton. After that, he was an executive of Federal Express Corporation in different positions from 1974 to 1983, and then was Chief Executive Officer and President of Carson Pirie Scott & Co. until 1989. Afterwards, he was the Chief Executive Officer of Willmott Services, Inc. He was Chief Executive Officer and President of Zenith Electronics Corporation from 1996 to 1998. He was a Managing Partner at Berkshires Capital Investors.

While at Carson Pirie Scott & Co, the Chicago Tribune featured "A 12-hour Day In The Life Of Carsons' Willmott." Willmott appeared in newspapers again when in 2005, his former secretary was found guilty of stealing over $9.5 million from him over years of working for him.

== Personal life ==
Willmott, an avid horse breeder, lived with his wife in Chicago, Illinois; they also had a house in Williamstown, Massachusetts.

Willmott was on Williams' Board of Trustees from 1983 to 1998 and was Chair of the Board from 1988 to 1998. He previously was on the board of trustees of the Clark Art Institute, the Associated Colleges of Illinois, and the Children's Memorial Medical Center. He died on November 11, 2023.
