= Julia Wilmotte Henshaw =

Canadian botanist and writer

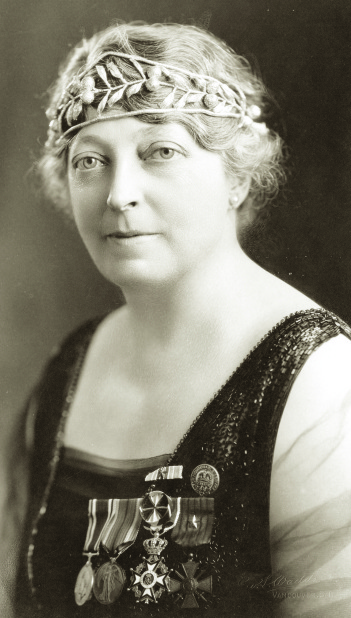
- Born: Julia Wilmotte Henderson; 8 August 1869; Durham, England
- Died: 19 November 1937 (aged 68); Vancouver, British Columbia, Canada
- Occupation: Botanist

Julia Wilmotte Henshaw (8 August 1869 – 19 November 1937) (Note: One source lists year of birth as 1868 and date of death as November 18, another as November 20.) was a Canadian botanist, geographer, writer, and political activist who also served with the Red Cross in World War I.

== Early life ==
Henshaw was born Julia Wilmotte Henderson (some sources spell it Willmothe) in 1869 in Durham, England. She was one of eight children. She studied in France and Germany before she moved to Canada in about 1890. She is sometimes erroneously credited with the discovery of the moccasin flower (also pink lady's slipper) (Cypripedium acaule), which had been known to science since 1789 and known from the Canadian Rocky Mountains since at least 1897, due to a misunderstanding of her statement "The Pink Lady's Slipper is so extremely rare in the Rocky Mountains that I regard my discovery of it in the year 1903 as the crowning triumph of my botanical work in that region." She married Charles Grant Henshaw (July 6, 1860, St. Hyacinthe, Quebec – circa 1927) in Montreal on June 15, 1887. Their only child, Doris, was born on September 20, 1889, and died circa 1974. They moved to British Columbia in 1890. She died from heart trouble. Doris married Grant Morden.

== World War I ==
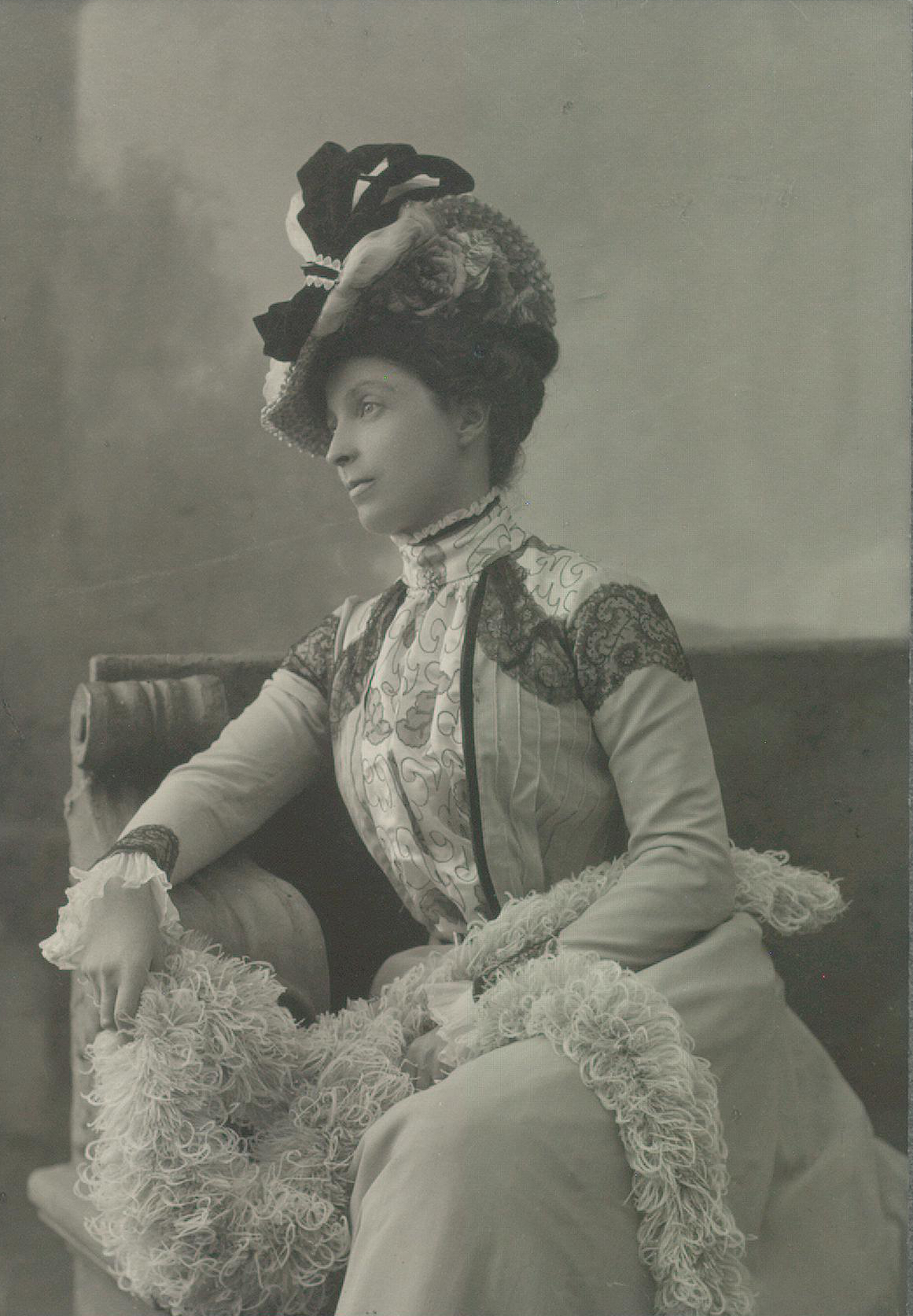
Portrait of Henshaw in her younger years

Henshaw travelled to France near the beginning of World War I, and returned to give speeches in favour of conscription and to raise money for ambulance services there. She particularly spoke to female audiences, some of whom had been granted the right to vote by the Wartime Elections Act of 1917, and hence to vote on the conscription question. Beginning in 1915, she served in the Royal Army Medical Corps as an ambulance driver as part of the British Red Cross Society. Due to her courage in evacuating soldiers and leadership, and despite having no medical training, she was promoted to the rank of captain. She was vice-president of the Canadian Imperial Order Daughters of the Empire. For her bravery she was awarded the Croix de Guerre with a Gold Star for "evacuating and recuperating inhabitants under shell fire and aerial bombarding with a devotion and courage worthy of the highest praise." Her husband was a military recruiter in Vancouver. During the war she made some trips back to Canada to make speeches supporting the war effort and conscription, including urging women who had the right to vote to support conscription, yet she also made speeches against granting women the right to vote. She was discharged by the Canadians but then served with the French Red Cross from March to November 1918.

== Other work ==
Henshaw mapped Vancouver Island's interior during 1910–1911. The Royal Geographical Society made her a Fellow in 1911. She also wrote for two newspapers in Vancouver. In 1914, she and her husband were the first people to drive a car across the Rocky Mountains.

== Books ==
Henshaw wrote these books:

- Hypnotized (1889), called Canadian "Book of the Year", using her nom de plume Julian Durham
- Why Not Sweetheart? (1901), using her nom de plume Julian Durham
- Mountain wild flowers of Canada; a simple and popular guide to the names and descriptions of the flowers that bloom above the clouds. Toronto: William Briggs. 1906.
- Mountain wild flowers of America; a simple and popular guide to the names and descriptions of the flowers that bloom above the clouds. Boston: Ginn & Company. 1906.
- Wild Flowers of the North American Mountains. New York: R.M. McBride. 1917.
