= British Commonwealth Union =

The British Commonwealth Union (BCU) was a protectionist organisation formed in the United Kingdom in 1916 to "found a solid business group in parliament" and to "press for the protective tariffs and restrictions on imports discussed at the Paris Economic Conference of 1916 and in the Balfour of Burleigh Committee on post-World War I commercial policy." Conservative Patrick Hannon was a key figure.

As well as being protectionist, the BCU was strongly opposed to trade unionism, and supported a number of anti-socialist and anti-labour activities.
