= Wilmots =

Wilmots is a surname. Notable people with the surname include:

- Marc Wilmots (born 1969), Belgian footballer and manager
- Marten Wilmots (born 1999), Belgian footballer
- Reno Wilmots (born 1997), Belgian footballer
