= Ben Line Agencies =

Scottish shipping company 1825 to 1991

Ben Line Agencies Ltd
- Type: Private
- Industry: Shipping Agents
- Founded: 1992 to present
- Headquarters: Singapore
- Area served: Asia
- Services: Liner Agency, Port Agency, Offshore Support, Project Logistics, Ship Broking
- Number of employees: 2,000
- Website: benlineagencies.com

Ben Line Steamers, Limited
- Type: Private
- Industry: Shipping
- Founded: 1825
- Defunct: c1991
- Headquarters: Leith, then Edinburgh, Scotland
- Area served: Italy, Canada, Asia, the Baltic

The Ben Line or Ben Line Steamers, Limited was a Scottish shipping company based in Leith, Scotland founded in 1825 which was primarily involved in the Far East to Europe trade. A private company, it was largely owned by members of the Thomson family from Leith and the Thomson and Mitchell family from Alloa.

In 1991 all its ships were sold and the company became Ben Line Agencies, a Singapore-based shipping agency, operating across Asia. As of 2013, the company had over 110 offices and 2,000 employees operating in four specific areas: port agency, liner agency, offshore support and project logistics services.

== History ==
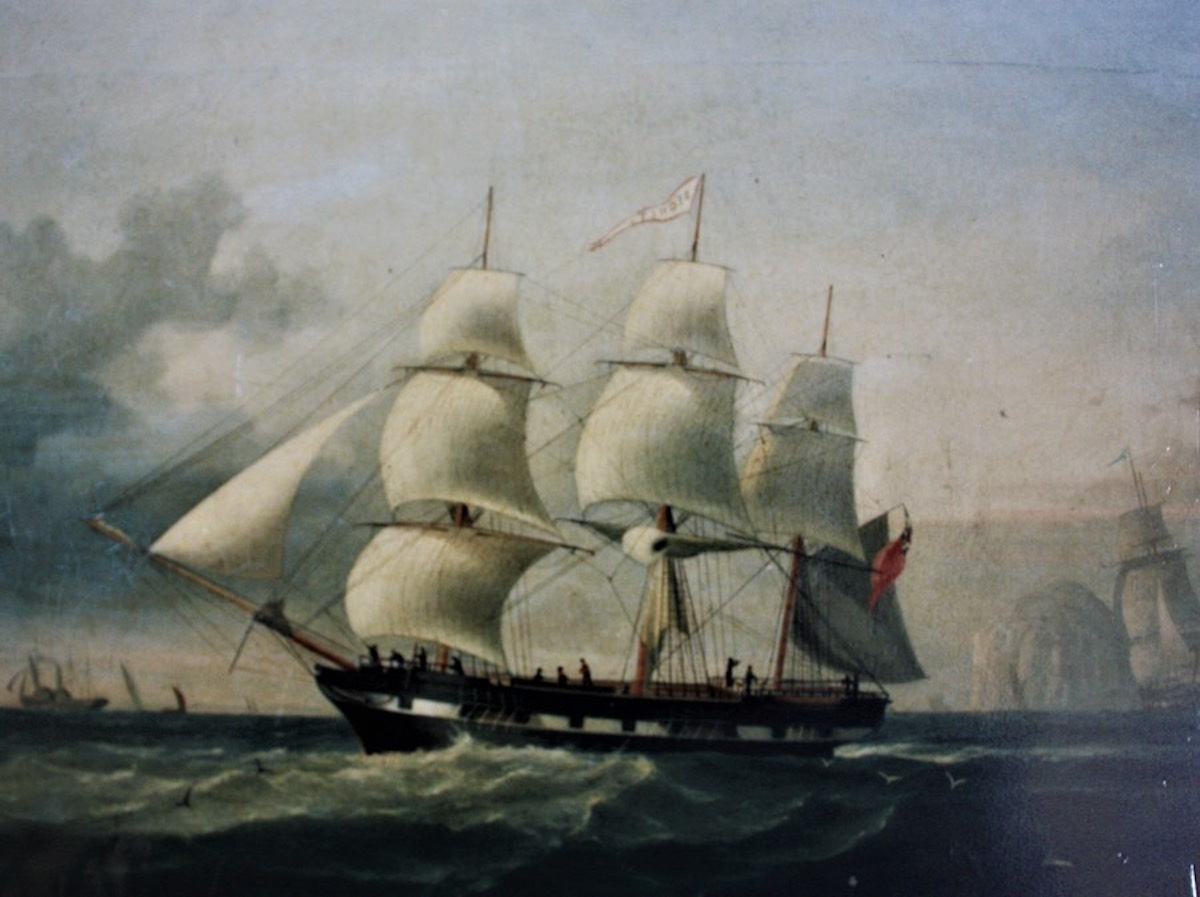
The Signet and The Ben Line ship Wanderer left Scotland in late 1852 for Australia, arriving in early 1853

The company was founded in 1825 as ship-brokers by two brothers, William Thomson (1806–1889) and Alexander Thomson (1795–1880). Their sister Jemima married Thomas Henderson, an older brother of Patrick Henderson. Originally the Thomson brothers were "merchants and marble-cutters" and were involved in importing Carrara marble from Leghorn, Italy, with help from Thomas Henderson. Their first ship in 1839 was the barque Carrara of 218 tons, built at Limekilns in Fife and used on the Leith–Leghorn run. The marble business declined in the 1830s, and with Alloa cousins Capt Watson Thomson with his nephew Andrew Thomson and William Mitchell, they acquired in 1840 for £3,500 the wooden ship Australia of 388 tons, built on the Tyne in 1825. She was used on the North Atlantic trade, carrying Alloa coal to Canada, and returning with timber to Leith, and was lost on Sable Island on the approaches to the St. Lawrence River in 1841. But the North Atlantic trade, carrying coal from William Mitchell’s Alloa Coal Company to Canada and returning with timber to Leith, was a Thomson staple business for years. Several sailing ships acquired in the 1840s were built in Canada. A ship purchased by the Edinburgh brothers and their cousins Captain Watson Thomson and Andrew Thomson in 1848 was the Signet which would in 1852/1853 venture to Australia.

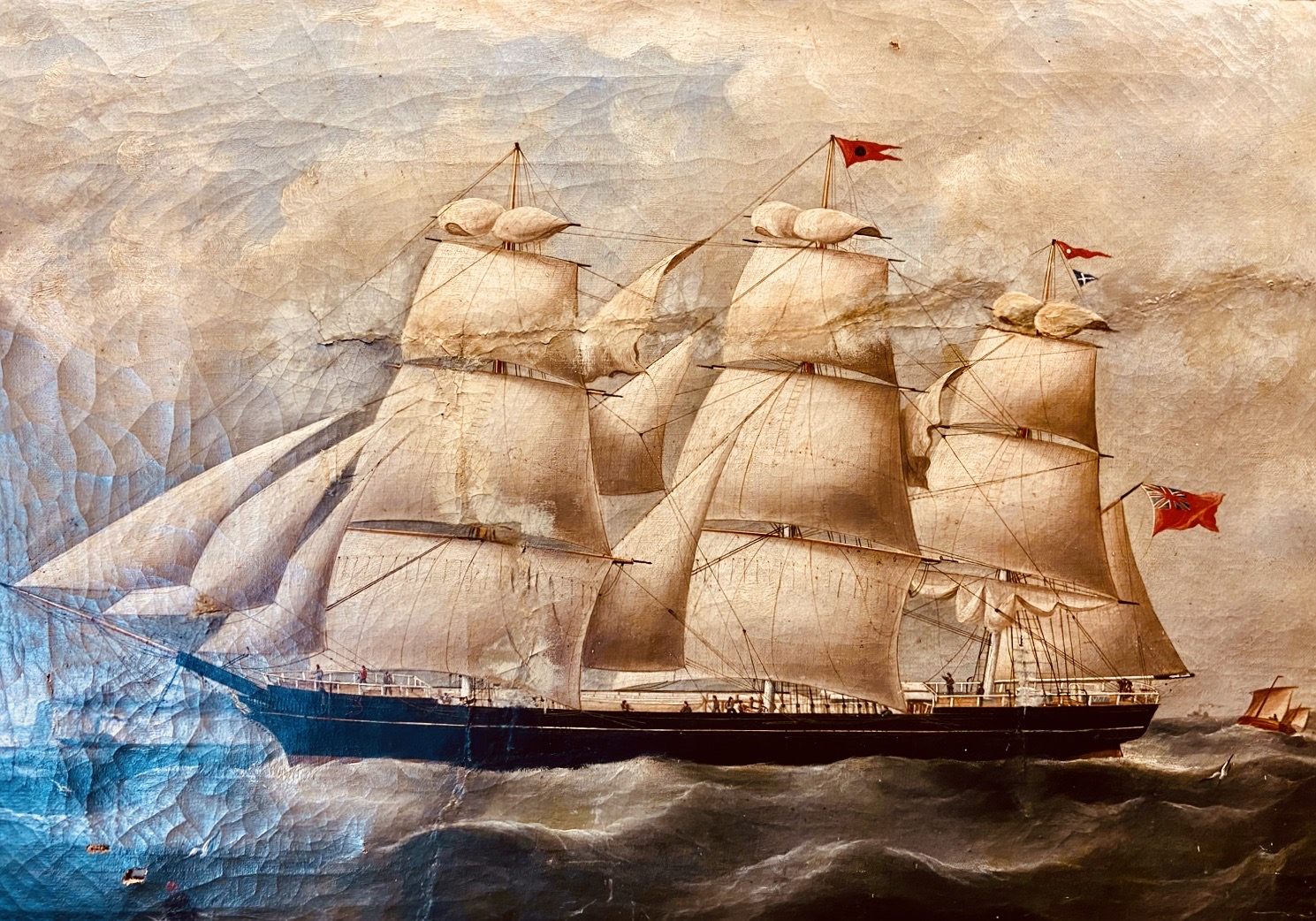
The Bencleuch launched in Alloa in April 1853

In the 1850s, the earliest ship to use the 'Ben' prefix (the Scottish word for mountain) was the Bencleuch, launched in 1853. The Thomsons and Mitchells moved into longer and more profitable routes to Australia (the Wanderer and Signet) and the Far East (initially the Araby Maid 1), purchasing nine larger sailing ships in the 1860s, including the iron ship James Wishart. The Far Eastern ships sailed to China and Japan via a base in Singapore, including the China tea trade. Their first (brig-rigged) steamship, Benledi of 1,557 tons gross was built in Glasgow at Barclay Curle Clydeholm shipyard. Two steamers, Petersburg and Stirling, were acquired in 1877 for the Baltic trade.

William Thomson appointed Killick Martin & Company agents for Ben Line Steamers in 1883, and within a few weeks loaded their first ship Benarty in Antwerp.

Between 1902 and 1914, Bartram & Sons of Sunderland built nine ships for Ben Line, whose captains nicknamed them "North Country kerosene cans".

=== 1914 to 1919 ===
By 1914 Ben Line had 14 ships with names starting with "Ben", plus five Baltic steamers of The St Petersburg Steamers, Ltd. Two Ben Line ships were sunk by enemy action and Benlarig disappeared in 1917.

In April 1919 The Ben Line Steamers, Ltd was formed as a private company. Previously each ship voyage was a separate actuarial entity, with shareholders holding large or small numbers of 1/64 shares. A new trade was the carriage of soya beans from the port of Vladivostok to European ports. New ships were built by Charles Connell and Company of Glasgow. No Ben Line ship was laid up during the depression.

=== World War II ===
During World War II, 14 Ben Line ships and four ships placed under Ben Line management by the Government were lost compared with only two in World War I. Ships managed by the Ben Line included two MAC or Merchant Aircraft Carrier ships, Empire MacAlpine and Empire MacKendrick. The MAC ships carried Fairey Swordfish biplanes as well as cargo. In 1943 the company headquarters was moved from Leith to Edinburgh.

=== 1950 to 1972 ===
Postwar the line concentrated on the Far East trade, with a base in Singapore from 1951. In 1953 an underwater formation in the coasts off North Borneo was named "Benrinnes Reef" after the ship that discovered it.

Between 1950 and 1972, Ben Line continued to develop its liner services between Europe and the Far East, operating fast, custom-built 'tween deck vessels. Ben Line pioneered a number of new trade routes, and became one of the leading liner companies in the trade.

From 1970 to 1982 the line came under the Chairmanship of Michael Strachan.

In 1972 Ben Line Ship Management Ltd was formed to offer a comprehensive range of ship management services to smaller owners, providing them with guidance from knowledge that Ben Line had gained over the years.

=== 1973 to 1974 ===
In 1973 The company's first three container ships, each with a capacity of 3,000 TEUs and a deadweight of 50,000 tons, were delivered. These ships operated within the 17 strong fleet of a three-nation consortium (the Trio Group) made up of Ben Line, Hapag-Lloyd, Mitsui O.S.K. Lines (MOL), Nippon Yusen Kaisha (NYK) and Overseas Containers Ltd (OCL) all engaged in the Far East trade. The company also entered the bulk trades by purchasing both dry bulk vessels and chemical tankers.

In 1974 The company diversified into offshore oil exploration by forming a partnership with an American firm, Ocean Drilling and Exploration Co (ODECO), an experienced operator. The joint company, which was called Ben Odeco, owned and operated semi-submersible rigs, jack-up rigs and drill ships.

=== 1977 to 1991 ===
By 1977 The Ben Line Group employed over 2,000 shore-based and sea-going staff, and owned a fleet of four container ships, 13 cargo liners, three chemical tankers, six bulk carriers, and five rigs and drill ships. In addition, three oil tankers and one container carrier were managed on behalf of other owners. Furthermore, through the purchase of another company, it owned seven other vessels and became Britain's biggest offshore drilling contractor.

Benreoch made history in 1984 as being the heaviest semi-submersible drilling rig (17,200 tons) to be transported on board a semi-submersible carrier, voyaging some 14,000 miles from New Zealand to Spain.

In 1987 a strategic decision to start actively seeking outside shipping agency principals to complement the in-house core business activity of container liner shipping – Ben Line Agencies was established.

In 1991 the remaining ships were sold, and the company combined with the East Asiatic Company of Copenhagen.

== Ben Line Agencies (1992 onward) ==
Following the sale of Ben Line's ships and rigs, emphasis was placed on the development of Ben Line Agencies, which is owned by its key stakeholders, many of whom are managers of the company. Descendants of the original shareholders also retained a substantial interest in the company.

During this period Ben Line Agencies operated from offices in Japan, Hong Kong, Singapore, Malaysia and Thailand. The main business activity was Liner Agency.

Over the next decade the company built a portfolio of shipping services including a liner agency, port agency, project logistics, offshore support, international freight forwarding, port representation, tank containers & leasing and P&I club representation and surveying.

In 2011 it opened its 100th office.

Ben Line Agencies have 130 offices with 2300 employees in 2023.

== Associated Companies ==
- William Thomson and Company
- Atlantis Air Ltd
- E.G. Thomson (Shipping) Ltd
- Elswick Steam Shipping Co. Ltd
- Salmonier Shipping Co. Ltd
- The Petrograd Steamers, Ltd (for Baltic trade, wound up in 1941).
- Ben Line Containers Ltd (1970)
- Ben Ocean & Ben Asia Container Service (1975)
- Ben Odeco (1974, offshore drilling partnership)
- Sheaf Steam Shipping of Newcastle (acquired 1976)
- Atlantic Drilling Company Ltd

== Bibliography ==
- Blake, George (1956). The Ben Line. London, Edinburgh: Thomas Nelson and Sons Ltd.
- MacGregor, David R (1986). The China bird: the history of Captain Killick, and the firm he founded, Killick Martin & Company (2nd rev. ed.). London: Conway Maritime Press. ISBN 0851773818. OCLC 15024735.
- Somner, Graeme H (2010). Ben Line. Ships in Focus Publications. ISBN 978-1-90170354-2.
- Thomson, Blair (2023). Sailing Upside Down Under. Amazon. ISBN 9798854256063. (The Alloa Thomsons' early role in The Ben Line and detail on the 1850s Australian venture).
- Putterman Dan (2025), THE PHOENIX OF THE SEAS The Two-Hundred-Year History of the Ben Line Berlinn Limited, ISBN 978-1-83983-096-9
