= Coleofasciculaceae =

Scientific classification
- Domain: Bacteria
- Phylum: Cyanobacteria
- Class: Cyanophyceae
- Order: Oscillatoriales
- Family: Coleofasciculaceae; Komárek et al. 2014

Genera
- Anagnostidinema Strunecký et al. 2015 provis.; Coleofasciculus Siegesmund et al. 2008; Desertifilum Dadheech et al. 2012; Geitlerinema Anagnostidis 1989; Kastovskya Mühlsteinová et al. 2014; Roseofilum Casamatta et al. 2012; Wilmottia Strunecký et al. 2011

Family of bacteria

The Coleofasciculaceae are a family of cyanobacteria.
