= Notional election results =

Election results after changes in a seat's population

The hypothetical results of the 2019 United Kingdom general election, if they had taken place under boundaries recommended by the Sixth Periodic Review.

Notional election results are calculations made, usually following boundary changes of electoral districts brought about by population shifts, to determine what election results would have been in previous elections had the newly created boundaries then been in place. Such calculations are used by psephologists and media for the purposes of detecting changing voting patterns and swings from one party to another from one election to the next, which is easier to calculate when no boundary changes have been implemented.

== Use in United Kingdom elections ==
Boundary reviews can favour a particular political party, as notional election calculations have found. In the case of the United Kingdom, the Conservative Party usually benefits slightly due to population shifts away from inner cities towards suburban areas, where the Conservative Party has a stronger vote base. Consequently, representation in inner city areas – usually areas where the Labour Party has its strongest voter base – declines as its population declines.

Notional election result calculations are of particular importance in the United Kingdom because the country is unusual in not releasing official breakdowns in voting data, which enables such data to be applied to electoral areas which are subject to boundary changes. Parliamentary constituencies are based on smaller local government wards, and it is the results from local government elections that are the primary source used to calculate notional results at a constituency level.

Professors Colin Rallings and Michael Thrasher of Plymouth University have been involved in calculating notional results for general elections since 1992 where periodic boundary changes have taken place. The data compiled from their work has been used by several prominent media companies including television channels for the purposes of comparing one general election result to the last.

Notional results have their limitations in that voting patterns may well have been different had new boundaries been in force at previous elections, because some voters who vote tactically may have chosen to vote differently under different boundaries, depending on which political parties or candidates were most competitive under old boundaries.

Other problems with making notional calculations is that people vote differently between national and local elections, particularly as many councilors enjoy a cross-party personal vote. Local factors can also have a great effect on voting patterns. In addition, a large number of wards are not contested by all the major political parties, some of them electing independent candidates or candidates from residents' associations. Sometimes wards themselves are subject to boundary changes.

On a national level, notional general election results by constituency have been calculated in the UK on numerous occasions in the past by academics and election experts such as Rallings and Thrasher, when boundary changes have been implemented.

In the February 1974 general election, notional results from the previous general election in 1970 were calculated on behalf of the BBC in constituencies where major boundary changes took effect. In 1983, extensive boundary changes led to notional general election results being jointly calculated by the BBC and ITN for the previous general election in 1979.

Further notional results were created for the 1997 general election (to compare with the 1992 general election), in 2005 (to take into account the reduction in the number of Scottish constituencies brought about by the establishment of the Scottish Parliament), in the 2010 general election (to compare with the 2005 general election), and in the 2024 general election (to compare with the 2019 general election).

== See also ==
- Notional results of the 2019 United Kingdom general election by 2024 constituency
