= 2023 review of Westminster constituencies =

Review of UK electoral boundaries

The 2023 review of Westminster constituencies was the most recent cycle of the process to redraw the constituency map for the House of Commons of the United Kingdom. The new constituency boundaries were approved by the Privy Council on 15 November 2023 and came into law on 29 November. It is the first review of Westminster boundaries to be successfully implemented since 2010. These constituencies were first contested at the 2024 general election.

== Legal basis ==
The process for periodic reviews of parliamentary constituencies in the United Kingdom is governed by the Parliamentary Constituencies Act 1986, as amended by the Parliamentary Voting System and Constituencies Act 2011 and subsequently by the Parliamentary Constituencies Act 2020.

== Individual registration ==
The 2023 review was the successor to the 2018 periodic review of Westminster constituencies, which was abandoned after it failed to pass into law. After abandonment of several previous reviews since 2015, the 2023 review was set to be the first review based on electoral registers drawn up using Individual Electoral Registration, which Parliament approved from 2014 to 2015. Because every routine canvass by local government reaches slightly fewer imminent attainers of the age of 18 than the previous system of household registration, the new system favours the Conservatives, according to a University of Manchester researcher in 2023. Local election offices are funded to implement mitigating measures to minimise any such disproportionate impacts. The Command Papers were sponsored and ordered by the Deputy Prime Minister of the Cameron-Clegg coalition, Nick Clegg, a Liberal Democrat.

== Process ==
Under current legislation, the four boundary commissions of the United Kingdom were required to report on their next review of the boundaries of parliamentary constituencies before 1 July 2023. In order to meet this deadline, the commissions began their work on 5 January 2021. Following three rounds of public consultation, all four commissions submitted their final proposals to the Speaker of the House of Commons on 27 June 2023. The Speaker immediately laid these before Parliament and the reports were published on the respective commissions' websites the following day. The new boundaries were formally introduced into UK law on 15 November 2023 through The Parliamentary Constituencies Order 2023. (The original deadline of the end of October was missed by the government, which, according to the Act, must only happen in exceptional circumstances).

A description of the review process is detailed in timeline of the 2023 periodic review of Westminster constituencies.

== Size of constituencies ==
The four boundary commissions launched their 2023 reviews on 5 January 2021, to coincide with the release by the Office for National Statistics (ONS) of electorate data from analysis of the electoral registers that had been published on 2 March 2020. The commissions jointly calculated the relevant electoral quota/range to be used for the 2023 review and the allocation of parliamentary constituencies between the four nations. The English commission further divided its allocation between the nine regions of England.

The electorate of the United Kingdom, comprising 650 constituencies, as determined by the ONS, was 47,558,398 on 2 March 2020. The electorate of the five protected constituencies – Isle of Wight (two seats), Na h-Eileanan an Iar, Orkney and Shetland, and Ynys Môn – amounted to 220,132, leaving 47,338,266 to be distributed between the remaining 645 constituencies, which gave an electoral quota of 73,393. Each non-protected constituency must have an electorate which is within 5% of this quota, which gave a permitted range of 69,724 to 77,062. In Northern Ireland the legislation allows for a wider range, in certain prescribed circumstances, from 68,313 to 77,062.

== Distribution of seats ==
=== United Kingdom ===
The 650 constituencies were allocated between the four nations of the UK in accordance with the Sainte-Laguë method as shown in the table below.

Nation	Pre-review seats (2010–2019)	Unprotected seats			Protected seats		Total		
Nation	Pre-review seats (2010–2019)	Electorate	Allocation	Average size	Electorate	Allocation	Electorate	Allocation	Change
England	533	39,748,705	541	73,473	111,716	2	39,860,421	543	+10
Northern Ireland	18	1,295,688	18	71,983	–	–	1,295,688	18	–
Scotland	59	4,023,611	55	73,157	56,001	2	4,079,612	57	−2
Wales	40	2,270,262	31	73,234	52,415	1	2,322,677	32	−8
Total	650	47,338,266	645	73,393	220,132	5	47,558,398	650	–

=== Regions of England ===
The Boundary Commission for England applied the same distribution formula to the English allocation, which results in the following redistribution of constituencies among the English regions:

Region	Pre-review seats (2010–2019)	Electorate	Allocation	Change	Average size
East Midlands	46	3,481,126	47	+1	74,067
Eastern	58	4,482,127	61	+3	73,477
London	73	5,550,454	75	+2	74,006
North East	29	1,952,999	27	−2	72,333
North West	75	5,381,549	73	−2	73,720
South East *	83	6,522,802	89	+6	73,290
South West	55	4,242,136	58	+3	73,140
West Midlands	59	4,169,012	57	−2	73,141
Yorkshire and the Humber	54	3,966,500	54	—	73,454
Unprotected seats	532	39,748,705	541	+9	73,428
Isle of Wight	1	111,716	2	+1	55,858
Total	533	39,860,421	543	+10	73,408

* Excluding Isle of Wight

== Final proposals ==
All four commissions submitted their Final Recommendations Reports to the speaker of the House of Commons on 27 June 2023. These were immediately laid before Parliament and the reports were published on the respective commissions' websites on 28 June 2023.

=== England ===
The final recommendations for England resulted in only 55 of the existing 533 constituencies remaining completely unchanged.

Regional summary
Region	Total proposed seats	Unchanged	Sub-regions
East Midlands	47 (+1)	7	Derbyshire; Leicestershire, Lincolnshire and Rutland (+1); Northamptonshire; Nottinghamshire
Eastern	61 (+3)	3	Bedfordshire and Hertfordshire (+1); Cambridgeshire (+1); Essex; Norfolk and Suffolk (+1)
London	75 (+2)	3	North East London; Newham and Tower Hamlets (+1); North Central London; North West London; South West London; South Central London (+1); South East London
North East	27 (−2)	2	North of Tyne (−1); North East (−1); Tees Valley
North West	73 (−2)	12	Cheshire and Merseyside; Cumbria and Lancashire (−2); Greater Manchester
South East	91 (+7)	14	Berkshire, Hampshire, and Surrey (+2); Buckinghamshire (+1); East Sussex and West Sussex (+1); Isle of Wight (+1); Kent (+1); Oxfordshire (+1)
South West	58 (+3)	2	Avon, Somerset, and Devon (+2); Cornwall; Dorset; Gloucestershire and Wiltshire (+1)
West Midlands	57 (−2)	8	Birmingham and Solihull; Coventry; Herefordshire; Shropshire; Staffordshire and the Black Country (−2); Warwickshire; Worcestershire
Yorkshire and the Humber	54 (–)	4	Humberside and South Yorkshire (−1); North Yorkshire and West Yorkshire (+1)
Total	543	55	

In Wales, 21 of the 32 seats were unaltered from the revised proposals; 10 had revised boundaries (of which five were renamed); and one had a name change only. In Scotland boundary changes affected 18 seats, of which 12 were renamed. Only name changes affected a further six, leaving 33 unaltered. In Northern Ireland, minor boundary changes affected five seats, with no changes to the proposed names.

=== Northern Ireland ===
As the number of constituencies in Northern Ireland remains the same, changes were only necessary to bring some of the electorates within the permitted range and align boundaries with those of revised local government wards. Belfast South was enlarged into the countryside and renamed Belfast South and Mid Down. East Antrim was extended further west, while Fermanagh and South Tyrone was extended further east into County Armagh.

==== Demographic changes from new boundaries ====
This table describes how the demographics of each constituency are different under the new boundaries compared to the old boundaries. The population disparity between constituencies exists because boundaries are drawn based on electorate size, not total population.

Constituency	Catholic		Protestant		No religion		Other religion		Total population	
Constituency	Old lines	New lines	Old lines	New lines	Old lines	New lines	Old lines	New lines	Old lines	New lines
Belfast East	10,679 (11.01%)	13,111 (12.82%)	51,872 (53.85%)	52,964 (51.79%)	31,792 (33.01%)	33,851 (33.10%)	1,981 (2.06%)	2,349 (2.30%)	96,324	102,275
Belfast North	46,485 (42.45%)	47,822 (44.91%)	37,090 (33.87%)	33,686 (31.63%)	23,615 (21.56%)	22,712 (21.33%)	2,317 (2.12%)	2,269 (2.13%)	109,507	106,489
Belfast South and Mid Down	44,768 (38.16%)	44,328 (37.08%)	32,208 (27.45%)	34,829 (29.13%)	34,845 (29.70%)	34,928 (29.22%)	5,499 (4.69%)	5,465 (4.57%)	117,320	119,950
Belfast West	69,641 (74.38%)	71,640 (69.43%)	11,738 (12.54%)	17,426 (16.89%)	10,606 (11.33%)	12,446 (12.06%)	1,642 (1.75%)	1,665 (1.61%)	93,627	103,177
East Antrim	15,709 (17.55%)	17,065 (17.60%)	48,378 (54.06%)	53,436 (55.11%)	24,428 (27.30%)	25,458 (26.26%)	977 (1.09%)	995 (1.03%)	89,492	96,954
East Londonderry	39,144 (39.26%)	41,106 (39.80%)	43,277 (43.40%)	44,461 (43.05%)	16,548 (16.42%)	16,962 (16.60%)	745 (0.75%)	756 (0.73%)	99,714	103,285
Fermanagh and South Tyrone	60,742 (55.62%)	64,271 (57.49%)	35,406 (32.42%)	34,501 (30.86%)	12,087 (11.07%)	12,021 (10.75%)	973 (0.89%)	997 (0.89%)	109,208	111,790
Foyle	72,966 (70.40%)	69,411 (71.33%)	18,332 (17.69%)	16,241 (16.69%)	11,279 (10.88%)	10,620 (10.91%)	1,075 (1.04%)	1,033 (1.06%)	103,652	97,305
Lagan Valley	22,185 (19.68%)	23,802 (21.25%)	60,598 (53.77%)	59,416 (53.05%)	28,239 (25.06%)	27,255 (24.33%)	1,685 (1.50%)	1,537 (1.37%)	112,707	112,010
Mid Ulster	69,196 (65.10%)	66,568 (63.26%)	27,466 (25.84%)	28,847 (27.41%)	9,063 (8.53%)	9,245 (8.79%)	560 (0.53%)	570 (0.54%)	106,285	105,230
Newry and Armagh	77,515 (62.99%)	71,766 (64.22%)	31,766 (25.81%)	27,189 (24.33%)	12,822 (10.42%)	11,881 (10.63%)	950 (0.77%)	911 (0.82%)	123,053	111,747
North Antrim	29,679 (26.44%)	28,245 (27.20%)	61,784 (55.04%)	56,171 (54.10%)	12,822 (17.86%)	11,881 (18.01%)	950 (0.67%)	911 (0.69%)	112,262	103,831
North Down	9,959 (10.69%)	10,352 (10.57%)	49,817 (55.04%)	52,671 (54.10%)	32,184 (17.86%)	33,627 (18.01%)	1,210 (0.67%)	1,248 (0.69%)	93,170	97,898
South Antrim	32,530 (30.58%)	31,490 (29.58%)	48,559 (45.64%)	49,475 (46.48%)	24,078 (22.63%)	24,286 (22.82%)	1,123 (1.12%)	1,190 (1.15%)	106,390	106,441
South Down	74,536 (65.22%)	68,036 (64.65%)	25,242 (22.09%)	24,284 (23.07%)	13,780 (12.06%)	12,249 (11.64%)	727 (0.64%)	672 (0.64%)	114,285	105,241
Strangford	14,195 (15.15%)	20,494 (20.88%)	52,951 (56.53%)	51,089 (52.05%)	25,555 (27.28%)	25,622 (26.10%)	967 (1.03%)	949 (0.97%)	93,668	98,154
Upper Bann	54,172 (41.82%)	50,007 (40.98%)	50,581 (39.05%)	48,722 (39.92%)	23,069 (17.81%)	21,686 (17.77%)	1,699 (1.31%)	1,624 (1.33%)	129,521	122,039
West Tyrone	61,050 (65.65%)	65,634 (65.80%)	23,929 (25.73%)	25,585 (25.65%)	7,470 (8.03%)	7,961 (7.98%)	541 (0.58%)	573 (0.57%)	92,990	99,753

=== Scotland ===
Map of Scotland (2024)

The following table details the proposed changes, based on the commission's final report.

Regional summary
Grouping of council areas	Number of constituencies	Number unchanged
Aberdeen City	2 (–)	0
Aberdeenshire, Argyll and Bute, Highland, and Moray	7 (−1)	1
Angus, Clackmannanshire, Dundee City, Falkirk, Fife, Perth and Kinross, Stirling, and West Lothian	13 (–)	0
Dumfries and Galloway, East Dunbartonshire, North Lanarkshire, Scottish Borders, South Lanarkshire, and West Dunbartonshire	12 (–)	1
City of Edinburgh, East Lothian, and Midlothian	7 (–)	1
East Ayrshire, North Ayrshire, and South Ayrshire	4 (–)	4
East Renfrewshire	1 (–)	1
Glasgow City, Inverclyde, and Renfrewshire	9 (−1)	0
Na h-Eileanan an Iar, Orkney Islands and Shetland Islands	2 (protected)	2

=== Wales ===
The final recommendations on the new constituencies in Wales were published on 28 June 2023 by the Boundary Commission for Wales. This followed years of proposals and consultations since 2021, with initial proposals published in 2021 and revised in 2022.

Legend – New constituency; expanded constituency; redefined constituency; revived constituency

Recommended constituency	Electoral wards from constituency	Status
Aberafan Maesteg	Bridgend (part), Ogmore (part), Aberavon (part), Neath (part)	New
Alyn and Deeside	Alyn and Deeside (all), Delyn (part)	Expanded
Bangor Aberconwy	Aberconwy (all), Clwyd West (part), Arfon (part)	New
Blaenau Gwent and Rhymney	Blaenau Gwent (all), Merthyr Tydfil and Rhymney (part), Islwyn (part), Caerphilly (part)	New
Brecon, Radnor and Cwm Tawe	Brecon and Radnorshire (all), Neath (part)	New
Bridgend	Bridgend (part), Ogmore (part)	Redefined
Caerfyrddin	Carmarthen East and Dinefwr (part), Carmarthen West and South Pembrokeshire (part)	Revived
Caerphilly	Caerphilly (part), Islwyn (part)	Redefined
Cardiff East	Cardiff Central (part), Cardiff South and Penarth (part)	Revived
Cardiff North	Cardiff North (all), Pontypridd (part)	Expanded
Cardiff South and Penarth	Cardiff South and Penarth (part), Cardiff Central (part), Vale of Glamorgan (part)	Redefined
Cardiff West	Cardiff West (all), Pontypridd (part)	Expanded
Ceredigion Preseli	Ceredigion (all), Preseli Pembrokeshire (part)	New
Clwyd East	Clwyd West (part), Clwyd South (part), Vale of Clwyd (part), Delyn (part)	New
Clwyd North	Clwyd West (part), Vale of Clwyd (part)	New
Dwyfor Meirionnydd	Clwyd South (part), Dwyfor Meirionnydd (all), Arfon (part)	Expanded
Gower	Gower (part), Swansea West (part)	Redefined
Llanelli	Llanelli (all), Carmarthen East and Dinefwr (part)	Expanded
Merthyr Tydfil and Aberdare	Merthyr Tydfil and Rhymney (part), Cynon Valley (part)	New
Mid and South Pembrokeshire	Preseli Pembrokeshire (part), Carmarthen West and South Pembrokeshire (part)	New
Monmouthshire	Monmouth (part), Newport East (part)	Revived
Montgomeryshire and Glyndŵr	Montgomeryshire (all), Clwyd South (part)	New
Neath and Swansea East	Aberavon (part), Neath (part), Gower (part), Swansea East (part)	New
Newport East	Newport East (part), Newport West (part)	Redefined
Newport West and Islwyn	Newport West (part), Islwyn (part)	New
Pontypridd	Cynon Valley (part), Ogmore (part), Pontypridd (part)	Redefined
Rhondda and Ogmore	Ogmore (part), Pontypridd (part), Rhondda (all)	New
Swansea West	Swansea East (part), Swansea West (part)	Redefined
Torfaen	Torfaen (all), Monmouth (part)	Expanded
Vale of Glamorgan	Vale of Glamorgan (part)	Redefined
Wrexham	Clwyd South (part), Wrexham (all)	Expanded
Ynys Môn	Ynys Môn (all)	Protected constituency

=== Political impact ===
According to analysis carried out by electoral modelling consultancy Electoral Calculus, a total of 24 constituencies would disappear (i.e. be broken up and not form the larger part of any proposed seats), offset by 24 wholly new constituencies (proposed seats which do not contain the larger part of any pre-existing seat). If the 2019 general election was re-run under the boundaries in the final proposals, it was estimated that a further 15 seats would change hands. The overall effect would be a net gain of 11 seats for the Conservatives, a net loss of 6 for Labour, a loss of 3 for the Liberal Democrats and 2 for Plaid Cymru. This was further analysed as follows:

Party	New seats	Abolished seats	Seats changing hands		Total
Party	New seats	Abolished seats	Gain	Loss	Total
Conservative	+19	−11	+8	−5	+11
Labour	+5	−10	+4	−5	−6
Liberal Democrat	–	–	–	−3	−3
Scottish National	–	−2	+3	−1	0
Plaid Cymru	–	−1	–	−1	−2
Total	+24	−24	+15	−15	–

In January 2024, professors Colin Rallings and Michael Thrasher published detailed estimates of what the result would have been had the new boundaries been in place at the previous general election. This analysis shows the Conservatives would have won seven additional seats in 2019, with Labour losing two, the Liberal Democrats three and Plaid Cymru two.

== New and abolished constituencies ==
In total, the review produced 211 newly named constituencies, with the same number of seat names no longer being used (comprising just under one third of the total of 650). These constituencies are listed alphabetically below. Note that a constituency name remaining the same or changing does not necessarily correlate with how much the seat's boundaries change, or whether the constituency would be seen as a "new constituency". For example, the pre-2023 Burton changes name to become the post-2023 Burton and Uttoxeter, but its boundaries remain identical; on the other hand, the constituency name Newcastle upon Tyne North remains the same after the review, but the majority of the post-review constituency covers different territory to the pre-review constituency, with only 43% of the pre-2023 Newcastle upon Tyne North remaining in the new seat after the review.

=== New constituency names ===
Following the publication of the final recommendations, the names of constituencies were introduced or re-introduced at the 2024 general election:

- Aberafan Maesteg
- Aberdeenshire North and Moray East
- Alloa and Grangemouth
- Angus and Perthshire Glens
- Arbroath and Broughty Ferry
- Argyll, Bute and South Lochaber
- Bangor Aberconwy
- Barnsley North
- Barnsley South
- Bathgate and Linlithgow
- Beckenham and Penge
- Belfast South and Mid Down
- Bethnal Green and Stepney
- Bicester and Woodstock
- Birmingham Hall Green and Moseley
- Birmingham Hodge Hill and Solihull North
- Blackley and Middleton South
- Blackpool North and Fleetwood
- Blaenau Gwent and Rhymney
- Blaydon and Consett
- Blyth and Ashington
- Bolton South and Walkden
- Brecon, Radnor and Cwm Tawe
- Brent East
- Brent West
- Bridgwater
- Bridlington and The Wolds
- Brigg and Immingham
- Brighton Kemptown and Peacehaven
- Bristol Central
- Bristol North East
- Broadland and Fakenham
- Bromley and Biggin Hill
- Buckingham and Bletchley
- Burton and Uttoxeter
- Bury St Edmunds and Stowmarket
- Caerfyrddin
- Cardiff East
- Ceredigion Preseli
- Chester North and Neston
- Chester South and Eddisbury
- Clapham and Brixton Hill
- Clwyd East
- Clwyd North
- Coatbridge and Bellshill
- Corby and East Northamptonshire
- Coventry East
- Cowdenbeath and Kirkcaldy
- Cramlington and Killingworth
- Croydon East
- Croydon West
- Cumbernauld and Kirkintilloch
- Dewsbury and Batley
- Didcot and Wantage
- Doncaster East and the Isle of Axholme
- Dorking and Horley
- Dover and Deal
- Droitwich and Evesham
- Dudley
- Dundee Central
- Dunfermline and Dollar
- Dunstable and Leighton Buzzard
- Earley and Woodley
- East Grinstead and Uckfield
- East Kilbride and Strathaven
- East Thanet
- East Wiltshire
- Edinburgh East and Musselburgh
- Edmonton and Winchmore Hill
- Ellesmere Port and Bromborough
- Eltham and Chislehurst
- Ely and East Cambridgeshire
- Exmouth and Exeter East
- Fareham and Waterlooville
- Farnham and Bordon
- Frome and East Somerset
- Gateshead Central and Whickham
- Glasgow West
- Glastonbury and Somerton
- Glenrothes and Mid Fife
- Godalming and Ash
- Goole and Pocklington
- Gordon and Buchan
- Gorton and Denton
- Grantham and Bourne
- Great Grimsby and Cleethorpes
- Halesowen
- Hamble Valley
- Hamilton and Clyde Valley
- Hammersmith and Chiswick
- Hampstead and Highgate
- Harborough, Oadby and Wigston
- Harpenden and Berkhamsted
- Henley and Thame
- Herne Bay and Sandwich
- Heywood and Middleton North
- Hinckley and Bosworth
- Hitchin
- Honiton and Sidmouth
- Hornsey and Friern Barnet
- Hove and Portslade
- Inverclyde and Renfrewshire West
- Inverness, Skye and West Ross-shire
- Isle of Wight East
- Isle of Wight West
- Jarrow and Gateshead East
- Keighley and Ilkley
- Kensington and Bayswater
- Kingston upon Hull North and Cottingham
- Kingston upon Hull West and Haltemprice
- Kingswinford and South Staffordshire
- Lancaster and Wyre
- Leeds Central and Headingley
- Leeds South
- Leeds South West and Morley
- Leeds West and Pudsey
- Leigh and Atherton
- Lewisham North
- Lewisham West and East Dulwich
- Liverpool Garston
- Lothian East
- Lowestoft
- Luton South and South Bedfordshire
- Maidstone and Malling
- Manchester Rusholme
- Melksham and Devizes
- Melton and Syston
- Meriden and Solihull East
- Merthyr Tydfil and Aberdare
- Mid and South Pembrokeshire
- Mid Buckinghamshire
- Mid Cheshire
- Mid Dunbartonshire
- Mid Leicestershire
- Middlesbrough and Thornaby East
- Milton Keynes Central
- Monmouthshire
- Montgomeryshire and Glyndŵr
- Moray West, Nairn and Strathspey
- Motherwell, Wishaw and Carluke
- Neath and Swansea East
- Newcastle upon Tyne Central and West
- Newcastle upon Tyne East and Wallsend
- Newport West and Islwyn
- Newton Aycliffe and Spennymoor
- Normanton and Hemsworth
- North Bedfordshire
- North Cotswolds
- North East Somerset and Hanham
- North Northumberland
- North Warwickshire and Bedworth
- North West Essex
- Nottingham North and Kimberley
- Oldham West, Chadderton and Royton
- Ossett and Denby Dale
- Peckham
- Pendle and Clitheroe
- Penrith and Solway
- Perth and Kinross-shire
- Pontefract, Castleford and Knottingley
- Queen's Park and Maida Vale
- Rawmarsh and Conisbrough
- Reading Central
- Reading West and Mid Berkshire
- Rhondda and Ogmore
- Richmond and Northallerton
- Runcorn and Helsby
- Rutherglen
- Rutland and Stamford
- Salford
- Selby
- Sherwood Forest
- Shrewsbury
- Smethwick
- Solihull West and Shirley
- South Cotswolds
- South Devon
- South Shropshire
- Southend East and Rochford
- Southend West and Leigh
- Southgate and Wood Green
- Spen Valley
- St Neots and Mid Cambridgeshire
- Stirling and Strathallan
- Stockton West
- Stone, Great Wyrley and Penkridge
- Stratford and Bow
- Streatham and Croydon North
- Sussex Weald
- Swindon North
- Swindon South
- Taunton and Wellington
- Tipton and Wednesbury
- Tiverton and Minehead
- Tonbridge
- Torridge and Tavistock
- Vauxhall and Camberwell Green
- Wakefield and Rothwell
- Walsall and Bloxwich
- Washington and Gateshead South
- Waveney Valley
- Weald of Kent
- Wetherby and Easingwold
- Wellingborough and Rushden
- Wells and Mendip Hills
- West Bromwich
- West Ham and Beckton
- Whitehaven and Workington
- Widnes and Halewood
- Wolverhampton West
- Worsley and Eccles

=== Abolished constituency names ===
The following constituency names disappeared at the 2024 general election:

- Aberavon
- Aberconwy
- Angus
- Arfon
- Argyll and Bute
- Banff and Buchan
- Barnsley Central
- Barnsley East
- Batley and Spen
- Beckenham
- Belfast South
- Berwick-upon-Tweed
- Bethnal Green and Bow
- Birmingham Hall Green
- Birmingham Hodge Hill
- Blackley and Broughton
- Blackpool North and Cleveleys
- Blaenau Gwent
- Blaydon
- Blyth Valley
- Bolton South East
- Bosworth
- Brecon and Radnorshire
- Brent Central
- Brent North
- Bridgwater and West Somerset
- Brigg and Goole
- Brighton Kemptown
- Bristol West
- Broadland
- Bromley and Chislehurst
- Buckingham
- Burton
- Bury St Edmunds
- Camberwell and Peckham
- Cardiff Central
- Carmarthen East and Dinefwr
- Carmarthen West and South Pembrokeshire
- Ceredigion
- Charnwood
- City of Chester
- Cleethorpes
- Clwyd South
- Clwyd West
- Coatbridge, Chryston and Bellshill
- Copeland
- Corby
- Coventry North East
- Croydon Central
- Croydon North
- Cumbernauld, Kilsyth and Kirkintilloch East
- Cynon Valley
- Delyn
- Denton and Reddish
- Devizes
- Dewsbury
- Don Valley
- Dover
- Dudley North
- Dudley South
- Dundee East
- Dundee West
- Dunfermline and West Fife
- East Devon
- East Dunbartonshire
- East Kilbride, Strathaven and Lesmahagow
- East Lothian
- East Yorkshire
- Eddisbury
- Edinburgh East
- Edmonton
- Ellesmere Port and Neston
- Elmet and Rothwell
- Eltham
- Enfield Southgate
- Fareham
- Garston and Halewood
- Gateshead
- Glasgow Central
- Glasgow North West
- Glenrothes
- Gordon
- Grantham and Stamford
- Great Grimsby
- Halesowen and Rowley Regis
- Haltemprice and Howden
- Halton
- Hammersmith
- Hampstead and Kilburn
- Harborough
- Hemsworth
- Henley
- Heywood and Middleton
- Hitchin and Harpenden
- Hornsey and Wood Green
- Hove
- Inverclyde
- Inverness, Nairn, Badenoch and Strathspey
- Isle of Wight
- Islwyn
- Jarrow
- Keighley
- Kensington
- Kingston upon Hull North
- Kingston upon Hull West and Hessle
- Kingswood
- Kirkcaldy and Cowdenbeath
- Lanark and Hamilton East
- Lancaster and Fleetwood
- Leeds Central
- Leeds West
- Leigh
- Lewisham Deptford
- Lewisham West and Penge
- Linlithgow and East Falkirk
- Ludlow
- Luton South
- Maidstone and The Weald
- Manchester Gorton
- Meon Valley
- Meriden
- Merthyr Tydfil and Rhymney
- Mid Worcestershire
- Middlesbrough
- Milton Keynes South
- Mole Valley
- Monmouth
- Montgomeryshire
- Moray
- Morley and Outwood
- Motherwell and Wishaw
- Neath
- Newcastle upon Tyne Central
- Newcastle upon Tyne East
- Newport West
- Normanton, Pontefract and Castleford
- North East Bedfordshire
- North East Somerset
- North Swindon
- North Thanet
- North Tyneside
- North Warwickshire
- North West Durham
- North Wiltshire
- Nottingham North
- Ochil and South Perthshire
- Ogmore
- Oldham West and Royton
- Pendle
- Penrith and The Border
- Perth and North Perthshire
- Preseli Pembrokeshire
- Pudsey
- Reading East
- Reading West
- Rhondda
- Richmond (Yorks)
- Rochford and Southend East
- Ross, Skye and Lochaber
- Rutherglen and Hamilton West
- Rutland and Melton
- Saffron Walden
- Salford and Eccles
- Sedgefield
- Selby and Ainsty
- Sherwood
- Shrewsbury and Atcham
- Solihull
- Somerton and Frome
- South East Cambridgeshire
- South Staffordshire
- South Swindon
- South Thanet
- South West Bedfordshire
- South West Surrey
- Southend West
- Stirling
- Stockton South
- Stone
- Streatham
- Swansea East
- Taunton Deane
- The Cotswolds
- Tiverton and Honiton
- Tonbridge and Malling
- Torridge and West Devon
- Totnes
- Vale of Clwyd
- Vauxhall
- Wakefield
- Walsall North
- Walsall South
- Wansbeck
- Wantage
- Warley
- Washington and Sunderland West
- Waveney
- Wealden
- Weaver Vale
- Wellingborough
- Wells
- Wentworth and Dearne
- West Bromwich East
- West Bromwich West
- West Ham
- Westminster North
- Wirral South
- Wolverhampton South West
- Workington
- Worsley and Eccles South
- Wyre and Preston North

=== Disappearing and newly created seats ===
Most of the new seats listed above are the result of name changes to existing constituencies following boundary changes of varying degrees, including five where the boundaries are unchanged. An existing seat where no part forms the largest part of any new seat is considered to be "disappearing". Conversely, any new seat which does not contain the largest part of any existing seat is considered to be genuinely "newly created".

The table below lists the disappearing and newly created constituencies.

Region/Nation	Net change	Disappearing	Newly created
East Midlands	+1		Melton and Syston
Eastern	+3		Harpenden and Berkhamsted; St Neots and Mid Cambridgeshire; Waveney Valley
London	+2		Stratford and Bow; Streatham and Croydon North
North East	−2	Blaydon; North Tyneside	
North West	−2	Denton and Reddish; Penrith and The Border; Wirral South; Wyre and Preston North	Manchester Rusholme; Mid Cheshire
South East	+7	Meon Valley	Bicester and Woodstock; Buckingham and Bletchley; Earley and Woodley; East Grinstead and Uckfield; Godalming and Ash; Hamble Valley; Isle of Wight West; Weald of Kent
South West	+3	Kingswood; North Wiltshire	Bristol North East; Frome and East Somerset; Melksham and Devizes; North Cotswolds; Tiverton and Minehead
West Midlands	−2	Dudley South; Stone; Walsall South	Stone, Great Wyrley and Penkridge
Yorkshire and the Humber	0	Brigg and Goole; Elmet and Rothwell; Leeds West	Leeds Central and Headingley; Wakefield and Rothwell; Wetherby and Easingwold
Scotland	−2	Glasgow Central; Ross, Skye and Lochaber	
Wales	−8	Arfon; Carmarthen West and South Pembrokeshire; Clwyd South; Cynon Valley; Newport West; Ogmore; Swansea East; Vale of Clwyd	

== Linked seats ==
An existing seat can be regarded as being linked to a newly named seat where part of the existing seat contributes the largest part of the newly named seat. There are a total of 187 linked constituencies, many of which involve significant changes resulting from the knock-on impact of new or abolished seats within review areas. However, some arise from the consultation process and involve only minor changes. The table below lists those constituencies with name changes, indicating the extent of the changes by reference to the proportion of the old constituency included in the new constituency, or the proportion of the new in the old, which ever is the lesser:

- None – name change only
- Minor – greater than 90%
- Moderate – between 75% and 90%
- Major – between 50% and 75%
- Wholesale – less than 50%

Region/nation	Abolished name	New name	Extent of change
East Midlands (9)	Bosworth	Hinckley and Bosworth	Moderate
East Midlands (9)	Charnwood	Mid Leicestershire	Major
East Midlands (9)	Corby	Corby and East Northamptonshire	Moderate
East Midlands (9)	Grantham and Stamford	Grantham and Bourne	Major
East Midlands (9)	Harborough	Harborough, Oadby and Wigston	Minor
East Midlands (9)	Nottingham North	Nottingham North and Kimberley	Major
East Midlands (9)	Rutland and Melton	Rutland and Stamford	Major
East Midlands (9)	Sherwood	Sherwood Forest	Minor
East Midlands (9)	Wellingborough	Wellingborough and Rushden	Moderate
Eastern (11)	Broadland	Broadland and Fakenham	Minor
Eastern (11)	Bury St Edmunds	Bury St Edmunds and Stowmarket	Moderate
Eastern (11)	Hitchin and Harpenden	Hitchin	Major
Eastern (11)	Luton South	Luton South and South Bedfordshire	Minor
Eastern (11)	North East Bedfordshire	North Bedfordshire	Moderate
Eastern (11)	Rochford and Southend East	Southend East and Rochford	Moderate
Eastern (11)	Saffron Walden	North West Essex	Moderate
Eastern (11)	South East Cambridgeshire	Ely and East Cambridgeshire	Major
Eastern (11)	South West Bedfordshire	Dunstable and Leighton Buzzard	Minor
Eastern (11)	Southend West	Southend West and Leigh	Moderate
Eastern (11)	Waveney	Lowestoft	Minor
London (21)	Beckenham	Beckenham and Penge	Major
London (21)	Bethnal Green and Bow	Bethnal Green and Stepney	Moderate
London (21)	Brent Central	Brent East	Major
London (21)	Brent North	Brent West	Moderate
London (21)	Bromley and Chislehurst	Bromley and Biggin Hill	Major
London (21)	Camberwell and Peckham	Peckham	Major
London (21)	Croydon Central	Croydon East	Moderate
London (21)	Croydon North	Croydon West	Major
London (21)	Edmonton	Edmonton and Winchmore Hill	Major
London (21)	Eltham	Eltham and Chislehurst	Major
London (21)	Enfield Southgate	Southgate and Wood Green	Major
London (21)	Hammersmith	Hammersmith and Chiswick	Major
London (21)	Hampstead and Kilburn	Hampstead and Highgate	Major
London (21)	Hornsey and Wood Green	Hornsey and Friern Barnet	Major
London (21)	Kensington	Kensington and Bayswater	Moderate
London (21)	Lewisham Deptford	Lewisham North	Moderate
London (21)	Lewisham West and Penge	Lewisham West and East Dulwich	Wholesale
London (21)	Streatham	Clapham and Brixton Hill	Major
London (21)	Vauxhall	Vauxhall and Camberwell Green	Major
London (21)	West Ham	West Ham and Beckton	Major
London (21)	Westminster North	Queen's Park and Maida Vale	Major
North East (12)	Berwick-upon-Tweed	North Northumberland	Moderate
North East (12)	Blyth Valley	Cramlington and Killingworth	Wholesale
North East (12)	Gateshead	Gateshead Central and Whickham	Major
North East (12)	Jarrow	Jarrow and Gateshead East	Moderate
North East (12)	Middlesbrough	Middlesbrough and Thornaby East	Moderate
North East (12)	Newcastle upon Tyne Central	Newcastle upon Tyne Central and West	Major
North East (12)	Newcastle upon Tyne East	Newcastle upon Tyne East and Wallsend	Major
North East (12)	North West Durham	Blaydon and Consett	Wholesale
North East (12)	Sedgefield	Newton Aycliffe and Spennymoor	Major
North East (12)	Stockton South	Stockton West	Moderate
North East (12)	Wansbeck	Blyth and Ashington	Major
North East (12)	Washington and Sunderland West	Washington and Gateshead South	Moderate
North West (19)	Blackley and Broughton	Blackley and Middleton South	Major
North West (19)	Blackpool North and Cleveleys	Blackpool North and Fleetwood	Major
North West (19)	Bolton South East	Bolton South and Walkden	Major
North West (19)	City of Chester	Chester North and Neston	Major
North West (19)	Copeland	Whitehaven and Workington	Major
North West (19)	Eddisbury	Chester South and Eddisbury	Major
North West (19)	Ellesmere Port and Neston	Ellesmere Port and Bromborough	Major
North West (19)	Garston and Halewood	Liverpool Garston	Moderate
North West (19)	Halton	Widnes and Halewood	Major
North West (19)	Heywood and Middleton	Heywood and Middleton North	Moderate
North West (19)	Lancaster and Fleetwood	Lancaster and Wyre	Major
North West (19)	Leigh	Leigh and Atherton	Moderate
North West (19)	Manchester Gorton	Gorton and Denton	Major
North West (19)	Oldham West and Royton	Oldham West, Chadderton and Royton	None
North West (19)	Pendle	Pendle and Clitheroe	Major
North West (19)	Salford and Eccles	Salford	Moderate
North West (19)	Weaver Vale	Runcorn and Helsby	Major
North West (19)	Workington	Penrith and Solway	Wholesale
North West (19)	Worsley and Eccles South	Worsley and Eccles	Major
South East (18)	Brighton Kemptown	Brighton Kemptown and Peacehaven	Minor
South East (18)	Buckingham	Mid Buckinghamshire	Wholesale
South East (18)	Dover	Dover and Deal	Minor
South East (18)	Fareham	Fareham and Waterlooville	Major
South East (18)	Henley	Henley and Thame	Minor
South East (18)	Hove	Hove and Portslade	None
South East (18)	Isle of Wight	Isle of Wight East	Major
South East (18)	Maidstone and The Weald	Maidstone and Malling	Major
South East (18)	Milton Keynes South	Milton Keynes Central	Wholesale
South East (18)	Mole Valley	Dorking and Horley	Major
South East (18)	North Thanet	Herne Bay and Sandwich	Moderate
South East (18)	Reading East	Reading Central	Major
South East (18)	Reading West	Reading West and Mid Berkshire	Major
South East (18)	South Thanet	East Thanet	Moderate
South East (18)	South West Surrey	Farnham and Bordon	Major
South East (18)	Tonbridge and Malling	Tonbridge	Moderate
South East (18)	Wantage	Didcot and Wantage	Moderate
South East (18)	Wealden	Sussex Weald	Major
South West (14)	Bridgwater and West Somerset	Bridgwater	Major
South West (14)	Bristol West	Bristol Central	Major
South West (14)	Devizes	East Wiltshire	Major
South West (14)	East Devon	Exmouth and Exeter East	Major
South West (14)	North East Somerset	North East Somerset and Hanham	Major
South West (14)	North Swindon	Swindon North	Moderate
South West (14)	South Swindon	Swindon South	Moderate
South West (14)	Somerton and Frome	Glastonbury and Somerton	Major
South West (14)	Taunton Deane	Taunton and Wellington	Moderate
South West (14)	The Cotswolds	South Cotswolds	Wholesale
South West (14)	Tiverton and Honiton	Honiton and Sidmouth	Major
South West (14)	Torridge and West Devon	Torridge and Tavistock	Minor
South West (14)	Totnes	South Devon	Minor
South West (14)	Wells	Wells and Mendip Hills	Major
West Midlands (18)	Birmingham Hall Green	Birmingham Hall Green and Moseley	Minor
West Midlands (18)	Birmingham Hodge Hill	Birmingham Hodge Hill and Solihull North	Major
West Midlands (18)	Burton	Burton and Uttoxeter	None
West Midlands (18)	Coventry North East	Coventry East	Moderate
West Midlands (18)	Dudley North	Dudley	Moderate
West Midlands (18)	Halesowen and Rowley Regis	Halesowen	Major
West Midlands (18)	Ludlow	South Shropshire	Minor
West Midlands (18)	Meriden	Meriden and Solihull East	Major
West Midlands (18)	Mid Worcestershire	Droitwich and Evesham	Minor
West Midlands (18)	North Warwickshire	North Warwickshire and Bedworth	None
West Midlands (18)	Shrewsbury and Atcham	Shrewsbury	Minor
West Midlands (18)	Solihull	Solihull West and Shirley	Moderate
West Midlands (18)	South Staffordshire	Kingswinford and South Staffordshire	Major
West Midlands (18)	Walsall North	Walsall and Bloxwich	Major
West Midlands (18)	Warley	Smethwick	Moderate
West Midlands (18)	West Bromwich East	West Bromwich	Major
West Midlands (18)	West Bromwich West	Tipton and Wednesbury	Major
West Midlands (18)	Wolverhampton South West	Wolverhampton West	Moderate
Yorkshire and the Humber (22)	Barnsley Central	Barnsley North	Moderate
Yorkshire and the Humber (22)	Barnsley East	Barnsley South	Major
Yorkshire and the Humber (22)	Batley and Spen	Spen Valley	Major
Yorkshire and the Humber (22)	Cleethorpes	Brigg and Immingham	Major
Yorkshire and the Humber (22)	Dewsbury	Dewsbury and Batley	Major
Yorkshire and the Humber (22)	Don Valley	Doncaster East and the Isle of Axholme	Major
Yorkshire and the Humber (22)	East Yorkshire	Bridlington and The Wolds	Moderate
Yorkshire and the Humber (22)	Elmet and Rothwell	Wetherby and Easingwold	Wholesale
Yorkshire and the Humber (22)	Great Grimsby	Great Grimsby and Cleethorpes	Major
Yorkshire and the Humber (22)	Haltemprice and Howden	Goole and Pocklington	Wholesale
Yorkshire and the Humber (22)	Hemsworth	Normanton and Hemsworth	Moderate
Yorkshire and the Humber (22)	Keighley	Keighley and Ilkley	None
Yorkshire and the Humber (22)	Kingston upon Hull North	Kingston upon Hull North and Cottingham	Major
Yorkshire and the Humber (22)	Kingston upon Hull West and Hessle	Kingston upon Hull West and Haltemprice	Major
Yorkshire and the Humber (22)	Leeds Central	Leeds South	Major
Yorkshire and the Humber (22)	Morley and Outwood	Leeds South West and Morley	Major
Yorkshire and the Humber (22)	Normanton, Pontefract and Castleford	Pontefract, Castleford and Knottingley	Moderate
Yorkshire and the Humber (22)	Pudsey	Leeds West and Pudsey	Wholesale
Yorkshire and the Humber (22)	Richmond (Yorks)	Richmond and Northallerton	Moderate
Yorkshire and the Humber (22)	Selby and Ainsty	Selby	Major
Yorkshire and the Humber (22)	Wakefield	Ossett and Denby Dale	Major
Yorkshire and the Humber (22)	Wentworth and Dearne	Rawmarsh and Conisbrough	Major
Northern Ireland (1)	Belfast South	Belfast South and Mid Down	Moderate
Scotland (26)	Angus	Angus and Perthshire Glens	Major
Scotland (26)	Argyll and Bute	Argyll, Bute and South Lochaber	Minor
Scotland (26)	Banff and Buchan	Aberdeenshire North and Moray East	Major
Scotland (26)	Coatbridge, Chryston and Bellshill	Coatbridge and Bellshill	Moderate
Scotland (26)	Cumbernauld, Kilsyth and Kirkintilloch East	Cumbernauld and Kirkintilloch	Moderate
Scotland (26)	Dundee East	Arbroath and Broughty Ferry	Major
Scotland (26)	Dundee West	Dundee Central	Moderate
Scotland (26)	East Dunbartonshire	Mid Dunbartonshire	Moderate
Scotland (26)	East Kilbride, Strathaven and Lesmahagow	East Kilbride and Strathaven	Minor
Scotland (26)	East Lothian	Lothian East	Moderate
Scotland (26)	Edinburgh East	Edinburgh East and Musselburgh	Moderate
Scotland (26)	Dunfermline and West Fife	Dunfermline and Dollar	Moderate
Scotland (26)	Glasgow North West	Glasgow West	Moderate
Scotland (26)	Glenrothes	Glenrothes and Mid Fife	Moderate
Scotland (26)	Gordon	Gordon and Buchan	Major
Scotland (26)	Inverclyde	Inverclyde and Renfrewshire West	Moderate
Scotland (26)	Inverness, Nairn, Badenoch and Strathspey	Inverness, Skye and West Ross-shire	Major
Scotland (26)	Kirkcaldy and Cowdenbeath	Cowdenbeath and Kirkcaldy	Moderate
Scotland (26)	Lanark and Hamilton East	Hamilton and Clyde Valley	Major
Scotland (26)	Linlithgow and East Falkirk	Bathgate and Linlithgow	Major
Scotland (26)	Moray	Moray West, Nairn and Strathspey	Major
Scotland (26)	Motherwell and Wishaw	Motherwell, Wishaw and Carluke	Moderate
Scotland (26)	Ochil and South Perthshire	Alloa and Grangemouth	Wholesale
Scotland (26)	Perth and North Perthshire	Perth and Kinross-shire	Major
Scotland (26)	Rutherglen and Hamilton West	Rutherglen	Major
Scotland (26)	Stirling	Stirling and Strathallan	Minor
Wales (16)	Aberavon	Aberafan Maesteg	Major
Wales (16)	Aberconwy	Bangor Aberconwy	Major
Wales (16)	Blaenau Gwent	Blaenau Gwent and Rhymney	Major
Wales (16)	Brecon and Radnorshire	Brecon, Radnor and Cwm Tawe	Moderate
Wales (16)	Cardiff Central	Cardiff East	Major
Wales (16)	Carmarthen East and Dinefwr	Caerfyrddin	Major
Wales (16)	Ceredigion	Ceredigion Preseli	Moderate
Wales (16)	Clwyd West	Clwyd North	Major
Wales (16)	Delyn	Clwyd East	Major
Wales (16)	Islwyn	Newport West and Islwyn	Major
Wales (16)	Merthyr Tydfil and Rhymney	Merthyr Tydfil and Aberdare	Major
Wales (16)	Monmouth	Monmouthshire	Moderate
Wales (16)	Montgomeryshire	Montgomeryshire and Glyndŵr	Major
Wales (16)	Neath	Neath and Swansea East	Major
Wales (16)	Preseli Pembrokeshire	Mid and South Pembrokeshire	Major
Wales (16)	Rhondda	Rhondda and Ogmore	Major

Sources:

- Electoral Calculus – New Constituency Boundaries for 2023
- House of Commons Library – Boundary review 2023: Which seats will change in the UK?

== Retained seats with major changes ==
The list below indicates those constituencies which have retained their names, but where boundary changes have resulted in major changes – where the proportion of the existing electorate included in the redefined constituency or vice versa, which ever is the lesser, is less than 75%.

- Aberdeen North
- Arundel and South Downs
- Ashford
- Ashton-under-Lyne
- Aylesbury
- Banbury
- Birmingham Ladywood
- Bishop Auckland
- Blackpool South
- Brentford and Isleworth
- Bridgend
- Bristol East
- Caithness, Sutherland and Easter Ross
- Cardiff South and Penarth
- Chippenham
- Dwyfor Meirionnydd
- East Hampshire
- Eastleigh
- Erith and Thamesmead
- Falkirk
- Glasgow East
- Glasgow North
- Glasgow North East
- Glasgow South West
- Gower
- Guildford
- Huntingdon
- Leeds North West
- Liverpool Riverside
- Liverpool Walton
- Liverpool Wavertree
- Liverpool West Derby
- Maidenhead
- Manchester Central
- Mid Sussex
- Milton Keynes North
- Morecambe and Lunesdale
- Newcastle upon Tyne North
- Newport East
- Northampton South
- Pontypridd
- Ribble Valley
- South Cambridgeshire
- South Norfolk
- South Northamptonshire
- South West Hertfordshire
- Stafford
- Stockport
- Stoke-on-Trent Central
- Stoke-on-Trent South
- Stourbridge
- Swansea West
- Westmorland and Lonsdale
- Windsor
- Wirral West
- Witney
- Wokingham
- Wolverhampton North East
- Wolverhampton South East
- Wrexham

== Notional 2019 general election results ==
The notional results of the 2019 election, if they had taken place under the post-2024 boundaries.

Researchers Michael Thrasher and Colin Rallings have calculated the notional results of the 2019 general election if it had taken place under the new constituency borders. In constituencies whose borders have changed, precise results under the new boundaries usually cannot be known as election results are not usually reported for subdivisions of constituencies. However, it is possible to estimate what the election results would have been by extrapolating from local election results for which more granular data is known.

Most news organisations, including the BBC, use these notional results for statistical purposes such as when calculating the swing from the 2019 general election to the 2024 general election by constituency.

The "Change" column is an index used by Thrasher and Rallings to refer to how radically the borders of the constituency in question changed in the boundary review. "None" is no change in the borders (therefore the notional results are identical to the actual results), a small number denotes little change, and a larger number denotes more change.

=== Great Britain ===
Constituency	Region	Country	Change	Party	Majority	Turnout	Votes								
Constituency	Region	Country	Change	Party	Majority	Turnout	Con	Lab	LD	Grn	Brx	SNP	PC	Other (Note: Includes all other parties, all independent candidates and the Speaker)	Total
Aldershot	SE	England	6.6	Con	17985	67.5	29453	11468	9068	1839	334	0	0	0	51828
Aldridge-Brownhills	WM	England	20.7	Con	22758	64.7	32941	10183	2654	873	334	0	0	336	47321
Altrincham and Sale West	NW	England	none	Con	6139	74.1	26311	20172	6036	1566	0	0	0	678	54763
Amber Valley	EM	England	0.1	Con	16891	64.6	29118	12227	2875	1389	0	0	0	0	45609
Arundel and South Downs	SE	England	57.8	Con	24105	75.5	35117	9108	11012	2312	0	0	0	556	58105
Ashfield	EM	England	18.0	Con	5303	61.5	16838	10986	890	563	2137	0	0	11535	42949
Ashford	SE	England	54.7	Con	17211	66.1	28759	11548	5176	2234	0	0	0	862	48579
Ashton-under-Lyne	NW	England	50.9	Lab	4689	57.2	14978	19667	1774	1440	3518	0	0	0	41377
Aylesbury	SE	England	54.3	Con	16640	76.5	29924	13284	12670	1701	309	0	0	0	57888
Banbury	SE	England	55.2	Con	13799	72.6	26397	12598	10335	1480	0	0	0	0	50810
Barking	GL	England	8.7	Lab	13993	57.1	11003	24996	1356	750	2914	0	0	0	41019
Barnsley North	YH	England	38.6	Lab	4002	57.9	10663	17141	1588	1051	13139	0	0	898	44480
Barnsley South	YH	England	61.4	Lab	4,720	49.4	8497	15684	1311	773	10964	0	0	279	37,508
Barrow and Furness	NW	England	11.5	Con	7436	65.3	26551	19115	2256	770	1355	0	0	0	50047
Basildon and Billericay	EE	England	9.7	Con	20749	60.9	30867	10118	3947	1395	0	0	0	526	46853
Basingstoke	SE	England	21.1	Con	12301	66.4	26966	14665	6797	2007	0	0	0	746	51181
Bassetlaw	EM	England	4.3	Con	12588	62.9	25941	13353	3210	0	5173	0	0	0	47677
Bath	SW	England	8.5	LD	12125	77.7	18251	7120	30376	146	642	0	0	341	56876
Battersea	GL	England	9.3	Lab	6026	76.3	19431	25457	8316	1364	350	0	0	0	54918
Beaconsfield	SE	England	7.9	Con	13772	72.8	29211	5211	0	1935	0	0	0	16276	52633
Beckenham and Penge	GL	England	84.0	Lab	631	78.5	23487	24118	9657	2416	464	0	0	0	60142
Bedford	EE	England	3.3	Lab	1113	66.5	19550	20663	4672	924	794	0	0	0	46603
Bermondsey and Old Southwark	GL	England	25.3	Lab	8515	65.0	7710	22776	14261	25	1113	0	0	0	45885
Bethnal Green and Stepney	GL	England	35.8	Lab	31655	64.9	5065	36720	4634	2101	992	0	0	439	49951
Beverley and Holderness	YH	England	10.6	Con	17976	69.6	30179	12203	4579	1234	0	0	0	1288	49483
Bexhill and Battle	SE	England	26.1	Con	20384	70.2	30716	10332	6658	2031	0	0	0	0	49737
Bexleyheath and Crayford	GL	England	33.1	Con	15038	67.6	28750	13712	2832	1070	416	0	0	520	47300
Bicester and Woodstock	SE	England	99.7	Con	14205	73.9	28030	8762	13825	1225	149	0	0	0	51991
Birkenhead	NW	England	18.7	Lab	22993	67.9	8063	31056	2062	1552	1744	0	0	7285	51762
Birmingham Edgbaston	WM	England	13.6	Lab	7691	63.9	16167	23858	3306	1172	1096	0	0	0	45599
Birmingham Erdington	WM	England	18.4	Lab	3305	54.0	17213	20518	1349	746	1673	0	0	0	41499
Birmingham Hall Green and Moseley	WM	England	15.8	Lab	26507	68.3	7772	34279	3703	869	997	0	0	4119	51739
Birmingham Hodge Hill and Solihull North	WM	England	73.6	Lab	12951	53.7	11793	24744	1788	1441	1271	0	0	257	41294
Birmingham Ladywood	WM	England	64.6	Lab	32583	58.2	4381	36964	1233	823	980	0	0	154	44535
Birmingham Northfield	WM	England	3.0	Con	1478	59.5	20135	18657	2013	972	1661	0	0	254	43692
Birmingham Perry Barr	WM	England	37.9	Lab	22325	63.4	9582	31907	3062	883	1333	0	0	148	46915
Birmingham Selly Oak	WM	England	5.8	Lab	11645	63.4	15291	26936	3018	1783	1319	0	0	0	48347
Birmingham Yardley	WM	England	32.0	Lab	13141	58.3	11208	24349	3743	503	2103	0	0	0	41906
Bishop Auckland	NE	England	52.9	Con	8113	69.9	26239	18126	1782	300	2739	0	0	325	49511
Blackburn	NW	England	3.1	Lab	18616	61.8	10182	28798	1058	698	2590	0	0	319	43645
Blackley and Middleton South	NW	England	75.7	Lab	11558	52.6	10599	22157	1130	764	2898	0	0	0	37548
Blackpool North and Fleetwood	NW	England	80.1	Con	10119	66.4	27946	17827	2020	954	858	0	0	443	50048
Blackpool South	NW	England	33.7	Con	3700	55.8	20715	17015	1497	810	2009	0	0	368	42414
Blaydon and Consett	NE	England	99.2	Lab	4285	66.9	16371	20656	2146	1421	4555	0	0	1816	46965
Blyth and Ashington	NE	England	72.1	Lab	6118	57.0	14382	20500	2761	1248	3921	0	0	178	42990
Bognor Regis and Littlehampton	SE	England	29.8	Con	22682	68.2	32645	9963	6978	1711	0	0	0	1213	52510
Bolsover	EM	England	0.8	Con	5273	61.2	21792	16519	1741	717	3920	0	0	987	45676
Bolton North East	NW	England	14.4	Con	1278	64.7	22436	21158	2188	803	3259	0	0	0	49844
Bolton South and Walkden	NW	England	66.5	Lab	10929	58.1	13961	24890	1695	1077	2361	0	0	0	43984
Bolton West	NW	England	28.6	Con	10619	69.1	28197	17578	2815	893	385	0	0	0	49868
Bootle	NW	England	none	Lab	34556	65.4	4510	39066	1822	1166	2610	0	0	0	49174
Boston and Skegness	EM	England	9.2	Con	27402	59.4	34406	7004	2180	0	0	0	0	1428	45018
Bournemouth East	SW	England	0.1	Con	8817	67.4	24957	16140	5418	2052	0	0	0	761	49328
Bournemouth West	SW	England	7.6	Con	9941	63.5	24512	14571	4603	2066	0	0	0	0	45752
Bracknell	SE	England	26.4	Con	14129	66.7	26022	11893	6555	1865	0	0	0	553	46888
Bradford East	YH	England	2.1	Lab	17761	59.6	9344	27105	3302	638	2647	0	0	0	43036
Bradford South	YH	England	2.3	Lab	2729	57.7	16381	19110	1519	1007	2872	0	0	0	40889
Bradford West	YH	England	none	Lab	27019	62.1	6717	33736	1349	813	1556	0	0	90	44261
Braintree	EE	England	18.2	Con	25466	68.3	34863	9397	5013	233	0	0	0	2169	51675
Brent East	GL	England	53.7	Lab	17756	58.0	10344	28100	3972	1426	175	0	0	0	44017
Brent West	GL	England	44.7	Lab	9431	63.3	16361	25792	4408	826	750	0	0	270	48407
Brentford and Isleworth	GL	England	44.6	Lab	11369	67.6	14609	25978	8425	1540	1063	0	0	0	51615
Brentwood and Ongar	EE	England	0.2	Con	28974	70.5	36202	7228	7179	1675	0	0	0	532	52816
Bridgwater	SW	England	60.5	Con	16724	63.0	26058	9334	7932	925	0	0	0	755	45004
Bridlington and The Wolds	YH	England	31.1	Con	21685	64.1	30916	9231	3479	1323	0	0	0	1491	46440
Brigg and Immingham	YH	England	65.8	Con	24444	66.0	33989	9545	2067	1315	329	0	0	0	47245
Brighton Kemptown and Peacehaven	SE	England	1.6	Lab	8280	70.8	17019	25299	2964	2813	1335	0	0	0	49430
Brighton Pavilion	SE	England	1.5	Green	19630	75.4	10129	12945	0	32575	762	0	0	690	57101
Bristol Central	SW	England	29.7	Lab	16696	73.2	7376	30077	0	13381	593	0	0	0	51427
Bristol East	SW	England	79.7	Lab	19393	72.8	12887	32280	3840	4664	1615	0	0	0	55286
Bristol North East	SW	England	116.4	Lab	5464	70.1	19134	24598	2494	1948	731	0	0	0	48905
Bristol North West	SW	England	23.7	Lab	7235	76.1	21312	28547	4735	3728	83	0	0	0	58405
Bristol South	SW	England	11.7	Lab	9077	64.6	15840	24917	3012	2445	2054	0	0	0	48268
Broadland and Fakenham	EE	England	6.7	Con	19825	72.4	31239	11414	8480	1318	0	0	0	363	52814
Bromley and Biggin Hill	GL	England	98.3	Con	14380	69.7	26710	12330	7838	1806	0	0	0	374	49058
Bromsgrove	WM	England	none	Con	23106	72.1	34408	11302	6779	1783	0	0	0	0	54272
Broxbourne	EE	England	15.3	Con	19192	63.2	30627	11435	4292	1321	0	0	0	0	47675
Broxtowe	EM	England	33.0	Con	3819	73.6	24083	20264	270	1606	364	0	0	6734	53321
Buckingham and Bletchley	SE	England	91.5	Con	13345	71.4	27912	14567	8118	629	508	0	0	875	52609
Burnley	NW	England	16.1	Con	127	62.4	19056	18929	3614	847	3362	0	0	1294	47102
Burton and Uttoxeter	WM	England	none	Con	14496	64.6	29560	15064	2681	1433	0	0	0	0	48738
Bury North	NW	England	12.6	Con	1282	69.4	25285	24003	1639	939	1446	0	0	158	53470
Bury South	NW	England	23.2	Con	935	66.5	21574	20639	3059	900	1847	0	0	1615	49634
Bury St Edmunds and Stowmarket	EE	England	33.2	Con	22085	69.4	33023	10938	565	6520	0	0	0	1435	52481
Calder Valley	YH	England	3.6	Con	5107	74.3	28991	23884	2858	0	0	0	0	721	56454
Camborne and Redruth	SW	England	19.6	Con	9848	70.1	27471	17623	4370	1441	0	0	0	676	51581
Cambridge	EE	England	7.6	Lab	8099	68.6	7344	23600	15501	2068	958	0	0	269	49740
Cannock Chase	WM	England	none	Con	19879	61.3	31636	11757	0	2920	0	0	0	0	46313
Canterbury	SE	England	5.7	Lab	2160	75.7	25622	27782	3257	0	0	0	0	505	57166
Carlisle	NW	England	36.7	Con	11290	67.5	28959	17669	2560	823	0	0	0	1229	51240
Carshalton and Wallington	GL	England	none	Con	629	67.5	20822	6081	20193	759	1043	0	0	200	49098
Castle Point	EE	England	2.3	Con	27009	63.8	34611	7602	3004	0	0	0	0	0	45217
Central Devon	SW	England	2.8	Con	17300	77.2	31366	14066	8503	2789	0	0	0	0	56724
Central Suffolk and North Ipswich	EE	England	27.8	Con	20,213	71.0	31222	11009	5365	2816	0	0	0	0	50,412
Chatham and Aylesford	SE	England	25.1	Con	18992	61.2	30183	11191	3085	1138	0	0	0	212	45809
Cheadle	NW	England	none	Con	2336	75.8	25694	6851	23358	0	0	0	0	0	55903
Chelmsford	EE	England	5.4	Con	15416	70.4	29447	9768	14031	0	0	0	0	580	53826
Chelsea and Fulham	GL	England	26.7	Con	8993	71.6	24909	15916	13053	228	175	0	0	500	54781
Cheltenham	SW	England	5.9	Con	1421	75.5	27563	2733	26142	0	0	0	0	445	56883
Chesham and Amersham	SE	England	36.0	Con	18216	72.4	30264	7473	12048	2600	0	0	0	1326	53711
Chester North and Neston	NW	England	48.7	Lab	6391	74.6	20746	27137	3337	1202	1502	0	0	0	53924
Chester South and Eddisbury	NW	England	83.6	Con	20826	76.7	32703	11877	8446	1163	569	0	0	451	55209
Chesterfield	EM	England	none	Lab	1451	63.9	16720	18171	3985	1148	4771	0	0	391	45186
Chichester	SE	England	38.2	Con	19622	66.5	29981	7850	10359	2499	0	0	0	333	51022
Chingford and Woodford Green	GL	England	22.3	Con	1604	72.2	26322	24718	3193	213	160	0	0	0	54606
Chippenham	SW	England	96.0	Con	13200	70.5	28485	5896	15285	853	0	0	0	0	50519
Chipping Barnet	GL	England	43.3	Con	4209	76.7	27777	23568	5745	1261	0	0	0	71	58422
Chorley	NW	England	4.4	Speaker	17392	53.5	0	0	0	3600	0	0	0	36270	39870
Christchurch	SW	England	3.0	Con	25034	72.5	34037	6676	9003	2174	0	0	0	0	51890
Cities of London and Westminster	GL	England	32.6	Con	5976	71.3	21020	15044	14713	1010	103	0	0	226	52116
City of Durham	NE	England	30.7	Lab	4657	70.4	16340	20997	8686	1688	3382	0	0	196	51289
Clacton	EE	England	7.9	Con	25717	60.1	32825	7108	2829	1341	0	0	0	1566	45669
Clapham and Brixton Hill	GL	England	91.6	Lab	17,291	64.4	9481	26924	9633	2045	549	0	0	0	48,632
Colchester	EE	England	8.8	Con	10940	63.9	25693	14753	7209	1436	0	0	0	0	49091
Colne Valley	YH	England	15.6	Con	7761	72.4	26517	18756	3630	893	1089	0	0	880	51765
Congleton	NW	England	14.1	Con	18203	71.3	30207	12004	5521	1423	0	0	0	658	49813
Corby and East Northamptonshire	EM	England	10.7	Con	8676	70.2	29443	20767	3680	0	0	0	0	0	53890
Coventry East	WM	England	34.5	Lab	7288	58.2	14950	22238	2307	995	2194	0	0	0	42684
Coventry North West	WM	England	none	Lab	208	65.0	20710	20918	2717	1443	1956	0	0	0	47744
Coventry South	WM	England	37.6	Lab	808	65.9	19912	20720	3152	1238	1348	0	0	435	46,805
Cramlington and Killingworth	NE	England	102.8	Lab	2157	65.6	19174	21331	2520	1192	3855	0	0	0	48072
Crawley	SE	England	none	Con	8360	67.0	27040	18680	2728	1451	0	0	0	0	49899
Crewe and Nantwich	NW	England	6.2	Con	5816	65.8	25511	19695	2573	951	1317	0	0	149	50196
Croydon East	GL	England	26.8	Lab	3413	67.2	20927	24340	3341	1177	837	0	0	0	50622
Croydon South	GL	England	27.2	Con	13408	71.1	27725	14317	6885	1466	59	0	0	442	50894
Croydon West	GL	England	62.6	Lab	20090	62.8	9561	29651	3097	1205	587	0	0	348	44449
Dagenham and Rainham	GL	England	23.0	Lab	706	59.7	18970	19676	1338	674	2913	0	0	421	43992
Darlington	NE	England	5.6	Con	4968	65.7	22994	18026	2139	1166	1684	0	0	292	46301
Dartford	SE	England	13.2	Con	14704	64.5	28413	13709	3251	1115	0	0	0	0	46488
Daventry	EM	England	17.4	Con	26612	74.4	36735	10123	7474	2624	0	0	0	0	56956
Derby North	EM	England	none	Con	2540	65.4	21259	18719	3450	1046	1908	0	0	635	47017
Derby South	EM	England	none	Lab	6019	58.9	15671	21690	2621	0	2480	0	0	0	42462
Derbyshire Dales	EM	England	19.1	Con	18797	75.5	31820	13023	6880	2207	0	0	0	0	53930
Dewsbury and Batley	YH	England	79.6	Lab	14009	65.6	13232	27241	1156	512	1565	0	0	2395	46101
Didcot and Wantage	SE	England	23.8	Con	10023	73.1	27045	8708	17022	370	0	0	0	1201	54346
Doncaster Central	YH	England	13.5	Lab	1271	61.4	16853	18124	1884	1038	7173	0	0	971	46043
Doncaster East and the Isle of Axholme	YH	England	65.2	Con	10085	61.4	22460	12375	1912	1015	4452	0	0	870	43084
Doncaster North	YH	England	8.9	Lab	2070	55.9	13286	15356	1446	18	8151	0	0	1813	40070
Dorking and Horley	SE	England	67.0	Con	10,381	77.5	27883	5415	17502	2302	0	0	0	1393	54,495
Dover and Deal	SE	England	0.8	Con	12421	67.5	29117	16696	2927	1404	0	0	0	1053	51197
Droitwich and Evesham	WM	England	5.6	Con	25631	70.9	34614	8983	6340	2114	0	0	0	638	52689
Dudley	WM	England	15.9	Con	13609	59.4	26668	13059	1600	897	0	0	0	0	42224
Dulwich and West Norwood	GL	England	24.6	Lab	24963	70.2	8686	33649	503	8475	566	0	0	315	52194
Dunstable and Leighton Buzzard	EE	England	7.4	Con	15386	65.2	28341	12955	5210	1764	0	0	0	0	48270
Ealing Central and Acton	GL	England	26.3	Lab	14133	70.3	13574	27707	9191	1793	720	0	0	0	52985
Ealing North	GL	England	1.9	Lab	11908	66.8	15555	27463	4311	1435	0	0	0	0	48764
Ealing Southall	GL	England	16.9	Lab	18266	67.9	12203	30469	4995	1928	946	0	0	457	50998
Earley and Woodley	SE	England	113.0	Con	11293	72.9	24922	13629	11147	1134	278	0	0	0	51110
Easington	NE	England	14.2	Lab	7852	56.9	10782	18634	1650	104	7230	0	0	1448	39848
East Grinstead and Uckfield	SE	England	124.4	Con	20291	79.1	33462	7768	13171	2830	0	0	0	0	57231
East Ham	GL	England	19.7	Lab	29863	66.6	6885	36748	1685	755	924	0	0	250	47247
East Hampshire	SE	England	58.9	Con	20200	77.4	31965	6662	11765	2971	0	0	0	812	54175
East Surrey	SE	England	31.3	Con	20565	70.4	31063	6787	10498	1534	0	0	0	1593	51475
East Thanet	SE	England	33.5	Con	7585	64.9	25616	18031	2486	1791	0	0	0	0	47924
East Wiltshire	SW	England	69.3	Con	24523	68.9	32301	7778	7100	1809	0	0	0	0	48988
East Worthing and Shoreham	SE	England	none	Con	7474	70.4	27107	19633	4127	2006	0	0	0	255	53128
Eastbourne	SE	England	8.0	Con	2168	69.9	24137	3560	21969	0	1408	0	0	185	51259
Eastleigh	SE	England	67.9	Con	8641	70.8	25711	5778	17070	1013	0	0	0	0	49572
Edmonton and Winchmore Hill	GL	England	49.0	Lab	13,067	64.2	15008	28075	3249	994	846	0	0	75	48,247
Ellesmere Port and Bromborough	NW	England	64.9	Lab	14577	63.7	12234	26811	3355	859	1957	0	0	0	45216
Eltham and Chislehurst	GL	England	43.9	Con	3444	68.9	23936	20492	3826	1516	1317	0	0	0	51087
Ely and East Cambridgeshire	EE	England	54.2	Con	13449	71.4	29385	7825	15936	310	0	0	0	1009	54465
Enfield North	GL	England	20.1	Lab	8853	66.1	18250	27103	3319	1228	908	0	0	0	50808
Epping Forest	EE	England	none	Con	22173	67.4	32364	10191	5387	1975	0	0	0	351	50268
Epsom and Ewell	SE	England	25.7	Con	16856	74.7	30752	9653	13896	1896	0	0	0	1200	57397
Erewash	EM	England	none	Con	10606	67.8	27560	16954	2487	1115	0	0	0	698	48814
Erith and Thamesmead	GL	England	47.5	Lab	12988	56.2	12153	25141	2119	1226	2174	0	0	272	43085
Esher and Walton	SE	England	22.0	Con	3015	76.7	27819	2698	24804	132	0	0	0	725	56178
Exeter	SW	England	13.0	Lab	10988	67.4	15512	26500	8	4516	1257	0	0	565	48358
Exmouth and Exeter East	SW	England	40.6	Con	8809	74.9	27828	5878	1691	970	171	0	0	19294	55832
Fareham and Waterlooville	SE	England	89.9	Con	21276	65.4	30819	7951	9543	2065	0	0	0	0	50378
Farnham and Bordon	SE	England	84.5	Con	13577	70.1	30376	3487	16799	479	0	0	0	0	51141
Faversham and Mid Kent	SE	England	21.4	Con	20618	67.2	30187	9569	6011	1974	0	0	0	474	48215
Feltham and Heston	GL	England	8.3	Lab	6993	58.3	15705	22698	2907	1049	1524	0	0	0	43883
Filton and Bradley Stoke	SW	England	34.8	Con	7,842	70.0	26263	18421	5153	1402	0	0	0	256	51,495
Finchley and Golders Green	GL	England	0.8	Con	6629	73.1	24267	13500	17638	7	0	0	0	0	55412
Folkestone and Hythe	SE	England	20.9	Con	13239	64.0	25227	11988	4481	2184	0	0	0	915	44795
Forest of Dean	SW	England	none	Con	15869	72.0	30680	14811	0	4681	0	0	0	1303	51475
Frome and East Somerset	SW	England	91.7	Con	12395	68.4	23646	10156	11251	2917	0	0	0	0	47970
Fylde	NW	England	25.4	Con	19254	69.2	32329	13075	3816	1800	0	0	0	927	51947
Gainsborough	EM	England	2.7	Con	22172	65.7	32568	10396	5088	0	0	0	0	1070	49122
Gateshead Central and Whickham	NE	England	50.6	Lab	5911	59.2	13876	19787	5138	1591	1629	0	0	0	42021
Gedling	EM	England	6.9	Con	2407	71.4	25537	23130	2429	1184	1820	0	0	0	54100
Gillingham and Rainham	SE	England	none	Con	15119	62.1	28173	13054	2503	1043	0	0	0	1185	45958
Glastonbury and Somerton	SW	England	71.7	Con	14183	76.0	30606	5095	16423	1070	0	0	0	0	53194
Gloucester	SW	England	5.9	Con	9880	66.6	27887	18007	3920	1279	0	0	0	0	51093
Godalming and Ash	SE	England	108.1	Con	10,720	78.0	29728	4964	19008	903	0	0	0	1071	55,674
Goole and Pocklington	YH	England	100.2	Con	22302	65.4	32492	10190	3882	1950	0	0	0	1387	49901
Gorton and Denton	NW	England	95.1	Lab	22175	61.7	8639	30814	2671	1155	2225	0	0	324	45828
Gosport	SE	England	none	Con	23278	65.7	32226	8948	5473	1806	0	0	0	0	48453
Grantham and Bourne	EM	England	60.6	Con	22393	67.8	32152	9759	4407	2108	0	0	0	426	48852
Gravesham	SE	England	none	Con	15581	65.3	29580	13999	2584	1397	0	0	0	0	47560
Great Grimsby and Cleethorpes	YH	England	55.8	Con	9759	54.1	23178	13419	2052	821	2049	0	0	156	41675
Great Yarmouth	EE	England	none	Con	17663	62.0	28593	10930	1661	1064	0	0	0	1214	43462
Greenwich and Woolwich	GL	England	12.6	Lab	15283	67.8	10760	26043	6902	2176	1089	0	0	370	47340
Guildford	SE	England	45.1	Con	3117	73.7	23708	4411	20591	197	0	0	0	3677	52584
Hackney North and Stoke Newington	GL	England	34.5	Lab	29,162	68.1	6694	35856	3973	4117	489	0	0	227	51,356
Hackney South and Shoreditch	GL	England	27.8	Lab	30141	63.6	4968	35109	3900	3081	648	0	0	111	47817
Halesowen	WM	England	55.7	Con	12082	62.5	26341	14259	1525	1066	0	0	0	533	43724
Halifax	YH	England	4.0	Lab	1902	64.1	19917	21819	2302	946	2813	0	0	0	47797
Hamble Valley	SE	England	105.4	Con	23488	74.2	35497	7739	12009	1796	0	0	0	0	57041
Hammersmith and Chiswick	GL	England	65.3	Lab	10823	71.3	16228	27051	7390	1632	976	0	0	0	53277
Hampstead and Highgate	GL	England	69.3	Lab	13400	77.3	13296	27338	13938	2096	719	0	0	0	57387
Harborough, Oadby and Wigston	EM	England	8.0	Con	15608	70.3	28636	13028	8911	1621	0	0	0	389	52585
Harlow	EE	England	7.7	Con	16694	64.5	30573	13879	2783	125	0	0	0	0	47360
Harpenden and Berkhamsted	EE	England	99.2	Con	15044	77.8	29136	5908	14092	907	0	0	0	5695	55738
Harrogate and Knaresborough	YH	England	6.2	Con	8787	73.3	28873	5349	20086	27	0	0	0	1208	55543
Harrow East	GL	England	23.8	Con	8987	68.5	28555	19568	3930	136	98	0	0	0	52287
Harrow West	GL	England	14.8	Lab	9098	67.2	17339	26437	4107	1028	882	0	0	0	49793
Hartlepool	NE	England	none	Lab	3595	57.6	11869	15464	1696	0	10603	0	0	1405	41037
Harwich and North Essex	EE	England	17.4	Con	17651	72.3	31668	14017	5801	1924	0	0	0	674	54084
Hastings and Rye	SE	England	7.7	Con	3532	69.5	25804	22272	3892	33	0	0	0	565	52566
Havant	SE	England	none	Con	21792	63.2	30051	8259	5708	1597	0	0	0	344	45959
Hayes and Harlington	GL	England	none	Lab	9261	60.4	15284	24545	1947	739	1292	0	0	187	43994
Hazel Grove	NW	England	16.7	Con	4219	69.2	22994	8208	18775	154	310	0	0	0	50441
Hemel Hempstead	EE	England	23.1	Con	13161	69.6	26963	13802	5569	1432	0	0	0	1299	49065
Hendon	GL	England	20.4	Con	3661	63.8	22299	18638	3909	747	0	0	0	0	45593
Henley and Thame	SE	England	8.5	Con	11901	76.2	29333	4809	17432	2268	0	0	0	0	53842
Hereford and South Herefordshire	WM	England	2.2	Con	19321	65.0	28539	9218	6154	2355	0	0	0	0	46266
Herne Bay and Sandwich	SE	England	38.6	Con	20372	67.0	32807	12435	3799	1921	0	0	0	0	50962
Hertford and Stortford	EE	England	8.3	Con	17806	73.8	30979	13173	7907	2587	0	0	0	989	55635
Hertsmere	EE	England	14.0	Con	22980	71.7	34083	11103	5713	1614	0	0	0	0	52513
Hexham	NE	England	18.5	Con	12186	74.2	29313	17127	5078	1954	473	0	0	0	53945
Heywood and Middleton North	NW	England	29.6	Lab	680	57.9	17601	18281	1787	1196	3581	0	0	0	42446
High Peak	EM	England	none	Con	590	73.2	24844	24254	2750	1148	1177	0	0	0	54173
Hinckley and Bosworth	EM	England	18.0	Con	22851	65.0	31800	6997	8949	1446	0	0	0	0	49192
Hitchin	EE	England	88.5	Con	11264	75.0	25419	14155	12798	818	0	0	0	871	54061
Holborn and St Pancras	GL	England	17.2	Lab	22766	59.1	6771	29537	5473	1790	836	0	0	175	44582
Honiton and Sidmouth	SW	England	65.7	Con	26229	76.4	34307	8078	5432	1174	0	0	0	7818	56809
Hornchurch and Upminster	GL	England	4.9	Con	21735	66.4	33404	11669	3634	1836	0	0	0	510	51053
Hornsey and Friern Barnet	GL	England	63.2	Lab	16607	74.4	6200	30077	13470	1983	494	0	0	311	52535
Horsham	SE	England	21.7	Con	17353	72.6	31155	8736	13802	1680	0	0	0	477	55850
Houghton and Sunderland South	NE	England	11.5	Lab	3271	57.0	14425	17696	2602	1183	6895	0	0	997	43798
Hove and Portslade	SE	England	none	Lab	17044	76.5	15832	32876	3731	2496	1111	0	0	345	56391
Huddersfield	YH	England	24.6	Lab	7441	64.9	17945	25386	2449	1884	1696	0	0	0	49360
Huntingdon	EE	England	65.5	Con	21,645	74.5	33352	11707	7899	1952	0	0	0	1407	56,317
Hyndburn	NW	England	none	Con	2951	59.6	20565	17614	1226	845	2156	0	0	0	42406
Ilford North	GL	England	46.0	Lab	9030	69.3	18994	28024	2056	709	968	0	0	1010	51761
Ilford South	GL	England	29.4	Lab	20409	62.6	9837	30246	1546	623	1034	0	0	3082	46368
Ipswich	EE	England	none	Con	5479	66.0	24952	19473	2439	1283	1432	0	0	0	49579
Isle of Wight East	SE	England	50.8	Con	12119	64.0	20866	8747	0	5093	0	0	0	1633	36339
Isle of Wight West	SE	England	49.2	Con	11618	69.4	20949	9331	0	6245	0	0	0	1578	38103
Islington North	GL	England	none	Lab	26188	72.7	5483	34603	8415	4326	742	0	0	236	53805
Islington South and Finsbury	GL	England	9.3	Lab	19458	68.7	8518	29728	10270	2252	1193	0	0	182	52143
Jarrow and Gateshead East	NE	England	30.2	Lab	10317	57.0	9600	19917	2649	1009	3843	0	0	3488	40506
Keighley and Ilkley	YH	England	none	Con	2218	72.1	25298	23080	2573	0	850	0	0	799	52600
Kenilworth and Southam	WM	England	16.9	Con	22303	78.1	32890	10587	9425	2334	86	0	0	457	55779
Kensington and Bayswater	GL	England	25.8	Lab	390	72.1	21004	21394	11048	769	453	0	0	145	54813
Kettering	EM	England	4.7	Con	17363	68.3	31369	14006	3477	1543	0	0	0	1642	52037
Kingston and Surbiton	GL	England	24.4	LD	11174	75.7	18884	5829	30058	900	649	0	0	775	57095
Kingston upon Hull East	YH	England	18.8	Lab	2495	46.8	11639	14134	1685	785	5710	0	0	0	33953
Kingston upon Hull North and Cottingham	YH	England	47.3	Lab	5922	59.1	15037	20959	2915	1173	4857	0	0	0	44941
Kingston upon Hull West and Haltemprice	YH	England	39.5	Con	3626	56.0	17686	14060	3837	442	5606	0	0	0	41631
Kingswinford and South Staffordshire	WM	England	84.5	Con	29355	71.0	37942	8587	2715	1803	0	0	0	0	51047
Knowsley	NW	England	21.8	Lab	32901	65.2	4060	36961	1165	915	2913	0	0	405	46419
Lancaster and Wyre	NW	England	73.9	Con	3012	65.8	23683	20671	1946	2192	890	0	0	0	49382
Leeds Central and Headingley	YH	England	112.8	Lab	19879	57.9	7817	27696	4884	1508	1757	0	0	0	43662
Leeds East	YH	England	37.7	Lab	2723	59.0	18156	20879	1626	946	2601	0	0	243	44451
Leeds North East	YH	England	0.0	Lab	17089	71.2	11935	29024	5665	1931	1769	0	0	176	50500
Leeds North West	YH	England	96.6	Con	2001	77.7	23311	21310	8212	1266	729	0	0	844	55672
Leeds South	YH	England	38.3	Lab	13886	57.9	11377	25263	1922	1635	2771	0	0	281	43249
Leeds South West and Morley	YH	England	55.5	Con	7114	61.1	23166	16052	1207	1440	780	0	0	957	43602
Leeds West and Pudsey	YH	England	95.9	Lab	2963	68.3	20257	23220	1747	687	1330	0	0	727	47968
Leicester East	EM	England	2.9	Lab	5999	63.1	18564	24563	2716	858	1210	0	0	329	48240
Leicester South	EM	England	13.7	Lab	22023	66.9	10373	32396	2054	1585	1100	0	0	0	47508
Leicester West	EM	England	12.8	Lab	4882	53.0	14145	19027	2592	1091	1740	0	0	0	38595
Leigh and Atherton	NW	England	29.7	Con	293	58.0	19410	19117	2031	154	2572	0	0	999	44283
Lewes	SE	England	27.6	Con	4126	74.0	26977	3930	22851	1587	122	0	0	113	55580
Lewisham East	GL	England	29.1	Lab	19979	65.3	9365	29344	4736	1653	1212	0	0	522	46832
Lewisham North	GL	England	31.0	Lab	28949	68.8	6175	35124	5620	2656	810	0	0	201	50586
Lewisham West and East Dulwich	GL	England	101.7	Lab	23823	66.1	6711	30534	4568	3368	832	0	0	213	46226
Leyton and Wanstead	GL	England	9.6	Lab	21121	68.5	9702	30823	5209	1868	836	0	0	427	48865
Lichfield	WM	England	3.5	Con	22609	71.0	33638	11029	5528	1702	0	0	0	568	52465
Lincoln	EM	England	none	Con	3514	68.3	24267	20753	2422	1195	1079	0	0	913	50629
Liverpool Garston	NW	England	35.9	Lab	28728	69.8	5729	34457	4854	1310	2402	0	0	344	49096
Liverpool Riverside	NW	England	61.6	Lab	32800	60.5	3297	36097	936	997	1089	0	0	0	42416
Liverpool Walton	NW	England	76.0	Lab	33729	65.4	4607	38336	1059	849	1040	0	0	660	46551
Liverpool Wavertree	NW	England	81.1	Lab	31926	72.4	4926	36852	4123	3167	1897	0	0	501	51466
Liverpool West Derby	NW	England	75.2	Lab	32321	66.0	4015	36336	1270	908	2293	0	0	1826	46648
Loughborough	EM	England	7.7	Con	6091	69.8	26088	19997	3935	1342	0	0	0	235	51597
Louth and Horncastle	EM	England	10.7	Con	27883	67.1	36903	9020	3966	0	0	0	0	1044	50933
Lowestoft	EE	England	8.8	Con	14850	61.4	27648	12798	2333	2362	0	0	0	245	45386
Luton North	EE	England	7.6	Lab	8740	60.9	15275	24015	2063	832	1319	0	0	1086	44590
Luton South and South Bedfordshire	EE	England	16.0	Lab	6066	64.2	15876	21942	225	1201	1497	0	0	4359	45100
Macclesfield	NW	England	none	Con	10711	71.0	28292	17581	5684	2310	0	0	0	0	53867
Maidenhead	SE	England	46.8	Con	17101	69.3	29223	7652	12122	1917	0	0	0	0	50914
Maidstone and Malling	SE	England	66.7	Con	19448	66.9	28562	8993	9114	1880	0	0	0	358	48907
Makerfield	NW	England	2.8	Lab	4955	59.0	15477	20432	2161	1166	5902	0	0	0	45138
Maldon	EE	England	6.0	Con	32001	69.9	38791	6790	6272	1851	0	0	0	0	53704
Manchester Central	NW	England	78.7	Lab	17970	53.8	8500	26470	2449	1159	1795	0	0	107	40480
Manchester Rusholme	NW	England	98.2	Lab	27901	56.8	3653	31554	1612	1709	1621	0	0	0	40149
Manchester Withington	NW	England	16.5	Lab	25297	69.5	5607	33100	7803	2015	1269	0	0	0	49794
Mansfield	EM	England	3.5	Con	16247	63.9	30718	14471	1571	0	0	0	0	985	47745
Melksham and Devizes	SW	England	99.4	Con	17028	77.6	32227	6686	15199	1652	0	0	0	0	55764
Melton and Syston	EM	England	91.5	Con	19,004	66.7	30232	11228	3685	2647	0	0	0	0	47,792
Meriden and Solihull East	WM	England	56.8	Con	20270	64.8	30438	10168	6613	1559	0	0	0	0	48778
Mid Bedfordshire	EE	England	19.3	Con	20509	71.5	31034	10525	6420	1998	0	0	0	1348	51325
Mid Buckinghamshire	SE	England	114.3	Con	22648	75.1	33321	8283	10673	1477	469	0	0	0	54223
Mid Cheshire	NW	England	116.0	Con	2494	67.2	22022	19528	3934	921	502	0	0	0	46907
Mid Derbyshire	EM	England	4.8	Con	16816	73.6	30724	13908	4960	1990	0	0	0	0	51582
Mid Dorset and North Poole	SW	England	13.6	Con	16570	73.9	32965	3982	16395	1565	0	0	0	0	54907
Mid Leicestershire	EM	England	60.2	Con	20188	72.5	34343	14155	4417	2278	0	0	0	0	55193
Mid Norfolk	EE	England	23.4	Con	20388	69.1	31639	11251	5127	154	0	0	0	939	49110
Mid Sussex	SE	England	45.4	Con	13665	73.3	27154	9530	13489	2179	0	0	0	597	52949
Middlesbrough and Thornaby East	NE	England	28.1	Lab	11141	52.4	9149	20290	991	553	2324	0	0	4282	37589
Middlesbrough South and East Cleveland	NE	England	14.1	Con	10299	64.3	26050	15751	1823	1005	128	0	0	266	45023
Milton Keynes Central	SE	England	92.3	Con	4952	68.6	25035	20083	5489	1297	0	0	0	746	52650
Milton Keynes North	SE	England	52.5	Con	6327	68.4	24933	18606	3246	1499	0	0	0	0	48284
Mitcham and Morden	GL	England	9.8	Lab	15879	67.2	13792	29671	5592	1160	1202	0	0	216	51633
Morecambe and Lunesdale	NW	England	42.3	Con	14188	73.2	29834	15646	8689	704	231	0	0	548	55652
New Forest East	SE	England	none	Con	25251	68.8	32769	7518	7390	2434	0	0	0	675	50786
New Forest West	SE	England	none	Con	24403	70.8	32113	6595	7710	3888	0	0	0	0	50306
Newark	EM	England	13.5	Con	21697	72.4	34935	13238	5298	1723	193	0	0	0	55387
Newbury	SE	England	14.4	Con	11460	71.2	28075	3929	16615	2027	0	0	0	325	50971
Newcastle upon Tyne Central and West	NE	England	74.7	Lab	15731	63.0	12789	28520	1430	1462	3934	0	0	0	48135
Newcastle upon Tyne East and Wallsend	NE	England	82.8	Lab	17793	65.0	11817	29610	4161	1923	2452	0	0	0	49963
Newcastle upon Tyne North	NE	England	125.2	Lab	6,823	70.8	17207	24030	7595	2193	3118	0	0	0	54,143
Newcastle-under-Lyme	WM	England	5.1	Con	8265	67.6	25008	16743	2670	1021	1921	0	0	0	47363
Newton Abbot	SW	England	0.2	Con	17456	71.8	29117	9287	11661	1505	0	0	0	840	52410
Newton Aycliffe and Spennymoor	NE	England	73.8	Con	3,408	60.8	20014	16606	2340	644	3374	0	0	394	43,372
Normanton and Hemsworth	YH	England	29.9	Lab	3520	57.5	13632	17152	1831	782	6609	0	0	3361	43367
North Bedfordshire	EE	England	28.2	Con	23,631	73.6	34360	10729	7403	1585	102	0	0	2023	56,202
North Cornwall	SW	England	6.7	Con	15783	72.1	31941	5201	16158	101	0	0	0	676	54077
North Cotswolds	SW	England	97.7	Con	20,997	71.6	30140	8391	9143	2944	175	0	0	0	50,793
North Devon	SW	England	none	Con	14813	72.7	31479	5097	16666	1759	0	0	0	580	55581
North Dorset	SW	England	9.6	Con	23195	74.1	34085	6379	10890	2110	0	0	0	0	53464
North Durham	NE	England	9.1	Lab	4424	65.4	16457	20881	3042	1249	5106	0	0	1063	47798
North East Cambridgeshire	EE	England	15.7	Con	25779	63.0	32934	7155	2992	1503	0	0	0	0	44584
North East Derbyshire	EM	England	0.9	Con	12902	68.4	28896	15994	3039	1319	231	0	0	0	49479
North East Hampshire	SE	England	21.9	Con	22433	77.4	35124	5808	12691	1700	0	0	0	1407	56730
North East Hertfordshire	EE	England	none	Con	18189	72.0	31293	13104	8563	2367	0	0	0	0	55327
North East Somerset and Hanham	SW	England	89.4	Con	16389	78.6	31435	15046	8625	1370	0	0	0	961	57437
North Herefordshire	WM	England	2.2	Con	25719	76.8	34009	8290	7329	4785	0	0	0	0	54413
North Norfolk	EE	England	1.5	Con	14492	72.9	30145	3980	15653	45	1739	0	0	0	51562
North Northumberland	NE	England	30.9	Con	17306	72.7	29497	12191	8484	1793	775	0	0	0	52740
North Shropshire	WM	England	7.8	Con	20543	67.8	32248	11705	5458	1719	0	0	0	1141	52271
North Somerset	SW	England	8.5	Con	16184	76.9	30411	14227	9425	2801	0	0	0	0	56864
North Warwickshire and Bedworth	WM	England	none	Con	17956	65.4	30249	12293	2069	1303	0	0	0	0	45914
North West Cambridgeshire	EE	England	25.1	Con	17032	63.9	28201	11169	5173	2464	25	0	0	0	47032
North West Essex	EE	England	11.9	Con	23227	72.5	34105	7616	10878	2678	0	0	0	0	55277
North West Hampshire	SE	England	30.7	Con	21507	68.0	31051	8730	9544	2362	0	0	0	0	51687
North West Leicestershire	EM	England	5.3	Con	18548	67.1	31402	12854	3465	2366	0	0	0	507	50594
North West Norfolk	EE	England	6.1	Con	21077	64.6	32075	10998	3779	1717	0	0	0	0	48569
Northampton North	EM	England	34.1	Con	3932	67.5	25427	21495	2906	1256	0	0	0	0	51084
Northampton South	EM	England	73.2	Con	13324	69.4	28652	15328	3931	1697	0	0	0	0	49608
Norwich North	EE	England	7.8	Con	6365	70.6	25997	19632	3141	1144	21	0	0	488	50423
Norwich South	EE	England	2.4	Lab	12583	70.0	14881	27464	4851	2477	1635	0	0	0	51308
Nottingham East	EM	England	13.7	Lab	18942	59.5	9336	28278	2824	1394	1527	0	0	1447	44806
Nottingham North and Kimberley	EM	England	47.1	Lab	2490	57.8	17309	19799	1615	1068	2424	0	0	822	43037
Nottingham South	EM	England	34.5	Lab	10041	59.3	14240	24281	3032	1483	2090	0	0	0	45126
Nuneaton	WM	England	none	Con	13144	64.2	27390	14246	1862	1692	0	0	0	0	45190
Old Bexley and Sidcup	GL	England	11.9	Con	20769	69.8	33158	12389	4303	1791	0	0	0	226	51867
Oldham East and Saddleworth	NW	England	none	Lab	1499	63.2	18589	20088	2423	778	2980	0	0	1306	46164
Oldham West, Chadderton and Royton	NW	England	none	Lab	11127	59.9	13452	24579	1484	681	3316	0	0	922	44434
Orpington	GL	England	31.2	Con	20627	68.4	30308	9681	7145	1824	0	0	0	0	48958
Ossett and Denby Dale	YH	England	92.5	Con	11027	67.9	26177	15150	2400	602	2484	0	0	1795	48608
Oxford East	SE	England	8.6	Lab	15959	63.0	9779	25738	6391	2143	1048	0	0	499	45598
Oxford West and Abingdon	SE	England	31.1	LD	9577	73.5	18039	6242	27616	249	769	0	0	0	52915
Peckham	GL	England	50.6	Lab	26553	62.6	4999	31552	4626	2232	1011	0	0	127	44547
Pendle and Clitheroe	NW	England	48.7	Con	11568	63.0	27619	16051	3562	1010	0	0	0	268	48510
Penistone and Stocksbridge	YH	England	none	Con	7210	69.4	23688	16478	5054	0	4300	0	0	0	49520
Penrith and Solway	NW	England	109.9	Con	13,760	72.7	30576	16816	4556	1733	1000	0	0	1097	55,778
Peterborough	EE	England	1.3	Con	2333	65.4	21955	19622	2316	713	2102	0	0	524	47232
Plymouth Moor View	SW	England	5.8	Con	13262	65.6	28810	15548	2430	1254	110	0	0	0	48152
Plymouth Sutton and Devonport	SW	England	5.2	Lab	5122	67.0	18725	23847	2416	1476	2799	0	0	0	49263
Pontefract, Castleford and Knottingley	YH	England	14.0	Lab	1082	56.7	14677	15759	2799	0	6518	0	0	1515	41268
Poole	SW	England	4.1	Con	18608	67.6	28695	10087	7490	1681	0	0	0	848	48801
Poplar and Limehouse	GL	England	18.4	Lab	22047	68.1	9129	31176	8009	1756	1219	0	0	376	51665
Portsmouth North	SE	England	none	Con	15780	63.9	28172	12392	3419	1304	0	0	0	623	45910
Portsmouth South	SE	England	none	Lab	5363	63.9	17705	23068	5418	0	994	0	0	240	47425
Preston	NW	England	25.1	Lab	11850	59.1	12847	24697	2913	862	1793	0	0	0	43112
Putney	GL	England	11.2	Lab	4416	76.0	20197	24613	9382	1298	36	0	0	0	55526
Queen's Park and Maida Vale	GL	England	89.3	Lab	18874	59.5	8865	27739	6230	1437	413	0	0	115	44799
Rawmarsh and Conisbrough	YH	England	67.0	Lab	1257	57.7	14992	16249	1500	194	6535	0	0	1074	40544
Rayleigh and Wickford	EE	England	3.5	Con	30348	69.3	38652	8304	4081	1960	0	0	0	0	52997
Reading Central	SE	England	58.3	Lab	8351	72.3	18756	27107	3288	1603	574	0	0	202	51530
Reading West and Mid Berkshire	SE	England	69.0	Con	16758	70.6	28078	11320	8356	1690	0	0	0	0	49444
Redcar	NE	England	7.4	Con	4878	62.7	21255	16377	2152	698	2915	0	0	1323	44720
Redditch	WM	England	6.7	Con	18423	67.9	30719	12296	3039	1447	0	0	0	0	47501
Reigate	SE	England	30.4	Con	19220	70.2	29846	9045	10626	3092	0	0	0	860	53469
Ribble Valley	NW	England	63.7	Con	16839	68.7	31261	14422	4179	1486	6	0	0	886	52240
Richmond and Northallerton	YH	England	12.6	Con	24331	71.3	32861	8530	6475	1976	0	0	0	2038	51880
Richmond Park	GL	England	8.2	LD	7725	78.7	23970	3109	31695	0	0	0	0	308	59082
Rochdale	NW	England	10.3	Lab	8109	58.7	13270	21379	3168	790	3451	0	0	0	42058
Rochester and Strood	SE	England	12.5	Con	13553	61.9	26098	12545	3170	1155	0	0	0	1667	44635
Romford	GL	England	2.0	Con	18536	65.6	31322	12786	2789	1462	0	0	0	0	48359
Romsey and Southampton North	SE	England	21.7	Con	16251	74.1	31647	6630	15396	391	0	0	0	640	54704
Rossendale and Darwen	NW	England	3.1	Con	9834	66.9	28124	18290	2083	1236	180	0	0	0	49913
Rother Valley	YH	England	8.6	Con	6135	64.8	20975	14840	2195	1124	5314	0	0	1040	45488
Rotherham	YH	England	22.9	Lab	3297	57.8	14402	17699	2717	50	7408	0	0	1245	43521
Rugby	WM	England	0.8	Con	13395	70.4	29308	15913	4236	1662	0	0	0	0	51119
Ruislip, Northwood and Pinner	GL	England	32.2	Con	15810	72.4	28916	13106	7920	1381	49	0	0	884	52256
Runcorn and Helsby	NW	England	94.5	Lab	5779	68.2	17838	23617	3247	1414	2302	0	0	0	48418
Runnymede and Weybridge	SE	England	38.4	Con	16072	71.4	28028	9347	11956	1415	0	0	0	1923	52669
Rushcliffe	EM	England	1.5	Con	7354	78.1	28168	20814	9496	0	0	0	0	1018	59496
Rutland and Stamford	EM	England	85.7	Con	25537	75.9	34052	7882	8515	1950	0	0	0	1375	53774
Salford	NW	England	32.8	Lab	14248	57.9	9729	23977	2571	1783	3703	0	0	0	41763
Salisbury	SW	England	29.4	Con	18848	75.1	29138	9884	10290	2685	0	0	0	745	52742
Scarborough and Whitby	YH	England	none	Con	10270	67.3	27593	17323	3038	0	0	0	0	1770	49724
Scunthorpe	YH	England	18.8	Con	10133	63.6	26616	16483	1249	866	2044	0	0	0	47258
Sefton Central	NW	England	22.5	Lab	10414	76.4	19600	30014	3789	1183	2081	0	0	422	57089
Selby	YH	England	48.2	Con	14838	70.6	30575	15737	3165	1602	0	0	0	1678	52757
Sevenoaks	SE	England	14.9	Con	21793	69.9	31780	6958	9987	1773	0	0	0	990	51488
Sheffield Brightside and Hillsborough	YH	England	1.4	Lab	12591	56.7	10247	22838	1570	1210	3916	0	0	585	40366
Sheffield Central	YH	England	21.1	Lab	20773	54.0	4722	25495	2070	4136	1170	0	0	474	38067
Sheffield Hallam	YH	England	5.7	Lab	1108	78.4	15435	21004	19896	1799	1641	0	0	291	60066
Sheffield Heeley	YH	England	33.1	Lab	12220	61.2	12399	24619	3070	1964	3643	0	0	0	45695
Sheffield South East	YH	England	10.9	Lab	5214	61.5	16709	21923	2186	80	5032	0	0	966	46896
Sherwood Forest	EM	England	13.6	Con	16290	68.1	31688	15398	2969	1354	0	0	0	700	52109
Shipley	YH	England	none	Con	6242	72.9	27437	21195	3188	1301	0	0	0	883	54004
Shrewsbury	WM	England	9.1	Con	7175	68.6	25454	18279	5574	1675	0	0	0	572	51554
Sittingbourne and Sheppey	SE	England	8.4	Con	21337	60.9	31106	9769	2962	1043	0	0	0	1883	46763
Skipton and Ripon	YH	England	5.8	Con	22517	74.0	33416	10899	8634	2693	0	0	0	1131	56773
Sleaford and North Hykeham	EM	England	21.3	Con	24680	70.2	34258	9578	4225	1246	0	0	0	2230	51537
Slough	SE	England	10.6	Lab	13347	60.5	13443	26790	3099	948	1280	0	0	0	45560
Smethwick	WM	England	13.6	Lab	10974	57.5	12365	23339	1841	956	2469	0	0	0	40970
Solihull West and Shirley	WM	England	38.6	Con	20798	71.1	30558	9760	7861	2000	0	0	0	0	50179
South Basildon and East Thurrock	EE	England	20.7	Con	18731	61.0	29271	10540	1836	68	0	0	0	3014	44729
South Cambridgeshire	EE	England	62.2	Con	1498	79.6	26153	9091	24655	96	83	0	0	0	60078
South Cotswolds	SW	England	90.4	Con	16092	73.0	30798	5669	14706	2016	0	0	0	0	53189
South Derbyshire	EM	England	11.6	Con	16483	66.3	29319	12836	3465	1579	0	0	0	0	47199
South Devon	SW	England	6.3	Con	13719	75.6	29027	9228	15308	82	0	0	0	544	54189
South Dorset	SW	England	8.5	Con	18147	68.8	31209	13062	5628	2335	0	0	0	485	52719
South East Cornwall	SW	England	0.7	Con	20225	72.8	30839	10614	8520	1405	0	0	0	869	52247
South Holland and the Deepings	EM	England	none	Con	30838	64.6	37338	6500	3225	1613	0	0	0	503	49179
South Leicestershire	EM	England	21.8	Con	25534	72.4	36452	10918	5243	2173	0	0	0	0	54786
South Norfolk	EE	England	50.4	Con	17175	74.3	29298	12123	8799	1637	0	0	0	0	51857
South Northamptonshire	EM	England	43.6	Con	23671	72.9	35270	11599	6205	2119	0	0	0	634	55827
South Ribble	NW	England	30.2	Con	8515	68.3	26348	17833	3812	1237	0	0	0	0	49230
South Shields	NE	England	11.0	Lab	8365	65.7	11827	20192	1625	1442	6725	0	0	3987	45798
South Shropshire	WM	England	10.8	Con	28636	74.9	37752	9116	8869	1999	0	0	0	0	57736
South Suffolk	EE	England	4.6	Con	21473	70.5	31094	9621	6360	3031	0	0	0	0	50106
South West Devon	SW	England	12.7	Con	23090	74.4	35102	12012	6807	2179	0	0	0	0	56100
South West Hertfordshire	EE	England	76.4	Con	17623	71.1	26548	8182	6460	763	0	0	0	8925	50878
South West Norfolk	EE	England	12.3	Con	24180	66.3	32988	8808	3965	1452	0	0	0	836	48049
South West Wiltshire	SW	England	18.6	Con	17378	66.0	27546	10168	7787	1736	0	0	0	0	47237
Southampton Itchen	SE	England	none	Con	4498	65.7	23952	19454	2503	1040	0	0	0	472	47421
Southampton Test	SE	England	none	Lab	6213	64.3	16043	22256	3449	1433	1591	0	0	222	44994
Southend East and Rochford	EE	England	14.3	Con	11942	61.6	25463	13521	2775	42	0	0	0	1356	43157
Southend West and Leigh	EE	England	11.7	Con	15454	66.9	30367	14913	5449	0	0	0	0	692	51421
Southgate and Wood Green	GL	England	86.2	Lab	15414	69.3	15051	30465	5242	1294	660	0	0	0	52712
Southport	NW	England	33.2	Con	6771	67.2	25092	18321	6217	178	0	0	0	0	49808
Spelthorne	SE	England	none	Con	18393	67.9	29141	10748	7499	2122	0	0	0	0	49510
Spen Valley	YH	England	56.7	Con	6064	65.4	21886	15822	2755	830	1627	0	0	4289	47209
St Albans	EE	England	4.3	LD	5905	78.0	21705	4878	27610	950	0	0	0	154	55297
St Austell and Newquay	SW	England	15.9	Con	15942	73.9	30620	14678	5964	1690	0	0	0	2146	55098
St Helens North	NW	England	none	Lab	12209	62.5	12661	24870	2668	1966	5396	0	0	0	47561
St Helens South and Whiston	NW	England	10.8	Lab	16720	64.0	9666	26386	2579	1944	4822	0	0	0	45397
St Ives	SW	England	3.8	Con	5227	76.9	26403	4893	21176	981	0	0	0	446	53899
St Neots and Mid Cambridgeshire	EE	England	111.1	Con	12250	67.0	25670	9414	13420	853	0	0	0	686	50043
Stafford	WM	England	55.2	Con	13720	72.7	29731	16011	3272	2297	0	0	0	0	51311
Staffordshire Moorlands	WM	England	19.9	Con	17659	67.3	30260	12601	2898	1450	0	0	0	0	47209
Stalybridge and Hyde	NW	England	none	Lab	2946	58.0	16079	19025	1827	1411	3591	0	0	435	42368
Stevenage	EE	England	none	Con	8562	67.8	25328	16766	4132	1457	0	0	0	0	47683
Stockport	NW	England	48.9	Lab	12012	61.5	12968	24980	3986	1635	2448	0	0	0	46017
Stockton North	NE	England	13.1	Lab	3972	61.8	16164	20136	1723	0	3896	0	0	1189	43108
Stockton West	NE	England	37.3	Con	11749	74.2	29397	17648	2316	262	2427	0	0	0	52050
Stoke-on-Trent Central	WM	England	42.6	Con	1715	57.6	19133	17418	1526	802	1731	0	0	0	40610
Stoke-on-Trent North	WM	England	15.5	Con	8077	59.9	22657	14580	1383	572	2334	0	0	322	41848
Stoke-on-Trent South	WM	England	57.6	Con	15393	67.0	29255	13862	2916	749	0	0	0	0	46782
Stone, Great Wyrley and Penkridge	WM	England	108.5	Con	21922	66.1	32010	10088	3046	1597	0	0	0	0	46741
Stourbridge	WM	England	58.0	Con	15133	66.3	28614	13481	2677	918	0	0	0	621	46311
Stratford and Bow	GL	England	84.1	Lab	26491	64.2	6877	33368	4265	1758	1107	0	0	0	47375
Stratford-on-Avon	WM	England	2.3	Con	19020	74.0	32236	6074	13216	2031	0	0	0	0	53557
Streatham and Croydon North	GL	England	96.4	Lab	20038	67.5	9666	29704	9002	2278	658	0	0	0	51308
Stretford and Urmston	NW	England	none	Lab	16417	68.4	13778	30195	2969	1357	1768	0	0	0	50067
Stroud	SW	England	22.4	Con	2467	79.6	27733	25266	1356	4857	909	0	0	567	60688
Suffolk Coastal	EE	England	9.7	Con	18355	72.1	29558	11203	7921	2308	0	0	0	1375	52365
Sunderland Central	NE	England	none	Lab	2964	59.8	15372	18336	3025	1212	5047	0	0	484	43476
Surrey Heath	SE	England	24.2	Con	15552	73.6	30161	4888	14609	1845	0	0	0	628	52131
Sussex Weald	SE	England	43.3	Con	23164	70.5	31486	7349	8322	2261	0	0	0	0	49418
Sutton and Cheam	GL	England	none	Con	8351	70.8	25235	7200	16884	1168	0	0	0	0	50487
Sutton Coldfield	WM	England	none	Con	19272	70.2	31604	12332	6358	2031	0	0	0	0	52325
Swindon North	SW	England	12.6	Con	13250	65.7	27719	14469	3744	1449	0	0	0	0	47381
Swindon South	SW	England	29.2	Con	5650	68.3	25564	19914	3788	261	0	0	0	0	49527
Tamworth	WM	England	3.8	Con	20663	64.6	31748	11085	2530	976	0	0	0	1245	47584
Tatton	NW	England	21.2	Con	19281	73.3	31732	12451	8966	2046	199	0	0	0	55394
Taunton and Wellington	SW	England	12.9	Con	8536	71.6	28298	4299	19762	0	0	0	0	2081	54440
Telford	WM	England	2.1	Con	10900	61.5	25842	14942	2714	27	0	0	0	0	43525
Tewkesbury	SW	England	36.3	Con	19443	74.4	31291	8448	11848	2271	0	0	0	0	53858
The Wrekin	WM	England	11.2	Con	21173	68.9	33929	12756	4212	1535	0	0	0	0	52432
Thirsk and Malton	YH	England	29.6	Con	23337	68.1	32624	9287	6502	2348	0	0	0	1437	52198
Thornbury and Yate	SW	England	10.9	Con	14538	74.8	32798	4899	18260	126	0	0	0	0	56083
Thurrock	EE	England	8.8	Con	11962	60.5	26580	14618	1390	739	0	0	0	1042	44369
Tipton and Wednesbury	WM	England	70.2	Con	4693	51.7	19371	14678	1195	722	2234	0	0	0	38200
Tiverton and Minehead	SW	England	109.5	Con	20665	69.8	30297	7070	9632	2103	0	0	0	309	49411
Tonbridge	SE	England	31.9	Con	27052	73.9	35262	8210	6690	4288	0	0	0	0	54450
Tooting	GL	England	none	Lab	14307	76.0	16504	30811	8305	2314	462	0	0	77	58473
Torbay	SW	England	1.6	Con	17751	67.3	30109	6620	12358	1236	0	0	0	648	50971
Torridge and Tavistock	SW	England	7.7	Con	22899	73.1	32708	9761	9809	1843	0	0	0	547	54668
Tottenham	GL	England	35.7	Lab	30488	60.2	5076	35564	2306	1965	588	0	0	221	45720
Truro and Falmouth	SW	England	22.0	Con	4459	75.3	25842	21383	5981	1522	0	0	0	450	55178
Tunbridge Wells	SE	England	none	Con	14645	72.7	30119	8098	15474	0	0	0	0	959	54650
Twickenham	GL	England	8.9	LD	13074	76.9	19742	5051	32816	0	743	0	0	0	58352
Tynemouth	NE	England	19.7	Lab	3512	73.9	21696	25208	3622	1318	2096	0	0	0	53940
Uxbridge and South Ruislip	GL	England	26.4	Con	7939	67.7	26712	18773	3371	1347	0	0	0	579	50782
Vauxhall and Camberwell Green	GL	England	64.3	Lab	19225	66.3	6746	28073	8848	1915	722	0	0	136	46440
Wakefield and Rothwell	YH	England	114.2	Con	2626	66.4	22022	19396	5361	490	1586	0	0	238	49093
Wallasey	NW	England	9.4	Lab	19422	70.5	13347	32769	2007	1219	2128	0	0	0	51470
Walsall and Bloxwich	WM	England	97.8	Con	2186	60.9	22453	20267	1338	696	588	0	0	288	45630
Walthamstow	GL	England	none	Lab	30862	68.2	5922	36784	2874	1733	768	0	0	254	48335
Warrington North	NW	England	0.2	Lab	1513	64.3	19054	20567	3055	1253	2617	0	0	0	46546
Warrington South	NW	England	11.7	Lab	65	70.6	24008	24073	4415	4	1461	0	0	168	54129
Warwick and Leamington	WM	England	12.3	Lab	1169	69.2	21444	22613	5693	1517	721	0	0	220	52208
Washington and Gateshead South	NE	England	32.1	Lab	3938	58.5	14152	18090	2067	1122	5784	0	0	739	41954
Watford	EE	England	29.3	Con	1300	68.4	20285	18985	8570	125	0	0	0	333	48298
Waveney Valley	EE	England	115.1	Con	22364	72.7	31898	9534	4696	4775	0	0	0	377	51280
Weald of Kent	SE	England	105.4	Con	28751	70.8	35730	6979	5018	1925	0	0	0	0	49652
Wellingborough and Rushden	EM	England	18.9	Con	16038	61.4	29333	13295	3140	1276	0	0	0	0	47044
Wells and Mendip Hills	SW	England	75.1	Con	14295	80.8	31678	6076	17383	661	0	0	0	643	56441
Welwyn Hatfield	EE	England	0.5	Con	10773	69.5	27188	16415	6583	1611	0	0	0	0	51797
West Bromwich	WM	England	73.2	Con	2150	57.3	19580	17430	1468	791	1563	0	0	545	41377
West Dorset	SW	England	9.0	Con	12388	76.7	31375	5414	18987	2037	0	0	0	0	57813
West Ham and Beckton	GL	England	63.5	Lab	21937	57.3	6648	28585	2450	1023	1118	0	0	606	40430
West Lancashire	NW	England	none	Lab	8336	71.5	19122	27458	2560	1248	2275	0	0	0	52663
West Suffolk	EE	England	17.1	Con	20797	64.7	31738	10941	4462	2199	0	0	0	0	49340
West Worcestershire	WM	England	none	Con	24499	75.1	34909	9496	10410	2715	0	0	0	0	57530
Westmorland and Lonsdale	NW	England	52.2	Con	5140	74.9	27188	3752	22048	287	601	0	0	324	54200
Weston-super-Mare	SW	England	15.2	Con	13310	64.9	26210	12900	5382	1380	0	0	0	0	45872
Wetherby and Easingwold	YH	England	109.9	Con	27164	76.1	37091	9927	4305	2137	0	0	0	937	54397
Whitehaven and Workington	NW	England	65.5	Con	2144	67.3	23904	21760	1953	609	749	0	0	394	49369
Widnes and Halewood	NW	England	65.1	Lab	21542	66.6	9829	31371	1312	1105	3592	0	0	0	47209
Wigan	NW	England	none	Lab	6728	59.6	14314	21042	2428	1299	5959	0	0	0	45042
Wimbledon	GL	England	29.6	Con	839	76.2	22617	11834	21778	138	139	0	0	366	56872
Winchester	SE	England	47.3	Con	9050	83.5	34522	3039	25472	586	0	0	0	292	63911
Windsor	SE	England	55.8	Con	18247	67.3	28036	9789	9441	1729	152	0	0	884	50031
Wirral West	NW	England	51.3	Lab	455	77.7	24863	25318	3204	1416	1245	0	0	0	56046
Witham	EE	England	11.8	Con	25669	69.4	34777	9108	5214	3006	0	0	0	0	52105
Witney	SE	England	59.0	Con	15674	69.7	28355	7520	12681	0	9	0	0	274	48839
Woking	SE	England	5.9	Con	8683	70.4	24358	8444	15675	1398	0	0	0	600	50475
Wokingham	SE	England	83.8	Con	12750	78.3	30524	5423	17774	1211	0	0	0	80	55012
Wolverhampton North East	WM	England	44.4	Con	7847	56.2	22034	14187	1412	725	1206	0	0	0	39564
Wolverhampton South East	WM	England	77.6	Lab	2373	50.5	15743	18116	1457	648	2263	0	0	0	38227
Wolverhampton West	WM	England	26.4	Con	934	67.4	24131	23197	2222	124	1264	0	0	0	50938
Worcester	WM	England	none	Con	6758	68.8	25856	19098	3666	1694	0	0	0	584	50898
Worsley and Eccles	NW	England	74.1	Lab	3961	64.4	19097	23058	2607	1260	3541	0	0	0	49563
Worthing West	SE	England	25.5	Con	13912	68.9	29433	15521	5213	1904	0	0	0	489	52560
Wycombe	SE	England	17.6	Con	1494	65.3	20213	18719	5310	1209	0	0	0	1441	46892
Wyre Forest	WM	England	none	Con	21413	65.7	32960	11547	4081	1973	0	0	0	0	50561
Wythenshawe and Sale East	NW	England	none	Lab	10396	58.2	13459	23855	3111	1559	2717	0	0	58	44759
Yeovil	SW	England	8.1	Con	14638	71.2	31477	3419	16839	1518	0	0	0	875	54128
York Central	YH	England	4.7	Lab	14342	66.9	13918	28260	3919	2098	1216	0	0	691	50102
York Outer	YH	England	4.7	Con	10782	75.3	27173	16391	10222	9	263	0	0	692	54750
Aberdeen North	SC	Scotland	61.3	SNP	14210	65.2	12306	6005	3875	612	813	26516	0	0	50127
Aberdeen South	SC	Scotland	21.1	SNP	5463	65.5	17220	4394	5358	268	195	22683	0	0	50118
Aberdeenshire North and Moray East	SC	Scotland	48.9	Con	2399	64.2	22174	1914	2028	0	0	19775	0	0	45891
Airdrie and Shotts	SC	Scotland	10.8	SNP	5324	65.8	8000	15343	1652	676	0	20667	0	0	46338
Alloa and Grangemouth	SC	Scotland	99.7	SNP	12727	63.2	11323	6622	2426	678	177	24050	0	382	45658
Angus and Perthshire Glens	SC	Scotland	91.6	SNP	6005	73.4	22504	2402	2803	0	329	28509	0	0	56547
Arbroath and Broughty Ferry	SC	Scotland	56.8	SNP	10777	67.9	15773	5321	4168	0	0	26550	0	312	52124
Argyll, Bute and South Lochaber	SC	Scotland	6.1	SNP	4897	70.7	17506	3592	7172	0	54	22403	0	0	50727
Ayr, Carrick and Cumnock	SC	Scotland	none	SNP	2329	64.7	17943	6219	2158	0	0	20272	0	0	46592
Bathgate and Linlithgow	SC	Scotland	37.3	SNP	8671	65.9	11635	8874	3881	1029	904	20306	0	588	47217
Berwickshire, Roxburgh and Selkirk	SC	Scotland	none	Con	5148	71.2	25747	2513	4287	0	0	20599	0	0	53146
Caithness, Sutherland and Easter Ross	SC	Scotland	60.2	SNP	2788	70.1	9139	2799	17710	336	1510	20498	0	728	52720
Central Ayrshire	SC	Scotland	none	SNP	5304	66.7	16182	6583	2283	0	0	21486	0	0	46534
Coatbridge and Bellshill	SC	Scotland	26.4	SNP	5084	63.3	5444	16646	1375	701	0	21730	0	0	45896
Cowdenbeath and Kirkcaldy	SC	Scotland	36.1	SNP	3220	67.0	10482	13902	3048	1655	939	17122	0	0	47148
Cumbernauld and Kirkintilloch	SC	Scotland	28.1	SNP	12005	68.3	7243	13079	2691	115	0	25084	0	0	48212
Dumfries and Galloway	SC	Scotland	5.3	Con	1556	68.3	22999	4923	3135	0	0	21443	0	0	52500
Dumfriesshire, Clydesdale and Tweeddale	SC	Scotland	10.7	Con	4338	72.0	23649	4223	3713	0	0	19311	0	0	50896
Dundee Central	SC	Scotland	27.7	SNP	15221	62.0	5161	11126	2586	0	1191	26347	0	240	46651
Dunfermline and Dollar	SC	Scotland	17.1	SNP	10073	68.7	10429	11463	4105	1085	1	21536	0	0	48619
East Kilbride and Strathaven	SC	Scotland	10.5	SNP	13169	68.8	11042	11142	3556	1074	0	24311	0	559	51684
East Renfrewshire	SC	Scotland	none	SNP	5426	75.9	19451	6855	4174	0	0	24877	0	0	55357
Edinburgh East and Musselburgh	SC	Scotland	22.7	SNP	11796	69.0	7354	13791	3642	1879	0	25587	0	0	52253
Edinburgh North and Leith	SC	Scotland	13.3	SNP	12983	76.7	10362	12790	7364	1920	508	25773	0	138	58855
Edinburgh South	SC	Scotland	6.7	Lab	10795	74.7	8922	24508	4344	1542	0	13713	0	0	53029
Edinburgh South West	SC	Scotland	none	SNP	11982	71.1	12848	7478	4971	1265	625	24830	0	114	52131
Edinburgh West	SC	Scotland	14.7	LD	2888	71.7	9922	4787	21037	1079	50	18149	0	0	55024
Falkirk	SC	Scotland	41.7	SNP	12578	64.9	12632	5880	3304	1511	176	25210	0	0	48713
Glasgow East	SC	Scotland	84.2	SNP	6276	59.0	5071	13779	1689	566	25	20055	0	0	41185
Glasgow North	SC	Scotland	77.0	SNP	5582	56.7	3658	14172	2156	1553	246	19754	0	0	41539
Glasgow North East	SC	Scotland	70.1	SNP	4277	56.7	4686	16098	1449	65	0	20375	0	0	42673
Glasgow South	SC	Scotland	19.6	SNP	9151	68.0	6161	14298	2922	1266	452	23449	0	0	48548
Glasgow South West	SC	Scotland	47.1	SNP	5533	61.1	5423	14561	1892	358	695	20094	0	0	43023
Glasgow West	SC	Scotland	25.4	SNP	9728	65.2	7254	13236	3554	180	74	22964	0	0	47262
Glenrothes and Mid Fife	SC	Scotland	39.1	SNP	9352	60.6	6482	11569	1876	146	1284	20921	0	0	42278
Gordon and Buchan	SC	Scotland	48.1	Con	3224	67.8	21874	1666	5401	0	0	18650	0	0	47591
Hamilton and Clyde Valley	SC	Scotland	77.9	SNP	7758	63.6	12076	12846	1816	79	0	20604	0	0	47421
Inverclyde and Renfrewshire West	SC	Scotland	15.3	SNP	8933	65.8	8284	13062	2982	0	0	21995	0	0	46323
Inverness, Skye and West Ross-shire	SC	Scotland	63.7	SNP	12865	66.0	11852	4771	7677	724	1042	24717	0	0	50783
Kilmarnock and Loudoun	SC	Scotland	none	SNP	12659	63.7	11557	9009	2444	0	0	24216	0	405	47631
Livingston	SC	Scotland	9.7	SNP	12424	65.3	10800	10851	3056	1272	0	23275	0	0	49254
Lothian East	SC	Scotland	13.6	SNP	2207	71.2	13956	15464	3193	0	0	17671	0	493	50777
Mid Dunbartonshire	SC	Scotland	11.3	SNP	1986	78.0	9118	5520	20193	916	0	22179	0	626	58552
Midlothian	SC	Scotland	none	SNP	5705	67.7	10467	14328	3393	0	0	20033	0	0	48221
Moray West, Nairn and Strathspey	SC	Scotland	58.5	SNP	2906	73.8	23035	2606	3307	649	321	25941	0	413	56272
Motherwell, Wishaw and Carluke	SC	Scotland	46.7	SNP	8294	62.1	9537	12344	1781	0	0	20638	0	619	44919
Na h-Eileanan an Iar	SC	Scotland	none	SNP	2438	68.4	3216	4093	637	0	0	6531	0	0	14477
North Ayrshire and Arran	SC	Scotland	none	SNP	8521	65.4	14855	6702	2107	1114	0	23376	0	0	48154
North East Fife	SC	Scotland	15.7	SNP	728	74.1	7126	2859	20643	0	184	21371	0	0	52183
Orkney and Shetland	SC	Scotland	none	LD	2507	66.5	2287	1550	10381	0	900	7874	0	168	23160
Paisley and Renfrewshire North	SC	Scotland	44.2	SNP	11753	66.9	9134	11103	3539	0	146	22856	0	0	46778
Paisley and Renfrewshire South	SC	Scotland	17.1	SNP	11023	66.0	8366	11910	2869	0	0	22933	0	0	46078
Perth and Kinross-shire	SC	Scotland	80.2	SNP	2364	74.0	23198	2818	4505	0	402	25562	0	0	56485
Rutherglen	SC	Scotland	39.1	SNP	5855	68.4	8462	15272	3526	0	0	21127	0	629	49016
Stirling and Strathallan	SC	Scotland	9.9	SNP	8556	75.1	20254	4424	3381	942	0	28810	0	0	57811
West Aberdeenshire and Kincardine	SC	Scotland	none	Con	843	72.4	22752	2431	6253	0	0	21909	0	0	53345
West Dunbartonshire	SC	Scotland	3.7	SNP	9841	66.3	6606	13322	1949	867	0	23163	0	708	46615
Aberafan Maesteg	WA	Wales	69.2	Lab	13457	63.6	10052	23509	1645	701	3794	0	3991	731	44423
Alyn and Deeside	WA	Wales	20.1	Lab	411	69.2	21963	22374	3095	0	3137	0	1781	0	52350
Bangor Aberconwy	WA	Wales	57.1	Con	749	68.7	19355	18606	2142	0	455	0	7849	0	48407
Blaenau Gwent and Rhymney	WA	Wales	39.6	Lab	12969	59.2	8246	21215	1576	418	7574	0	2687	378	42094
Brecon, Radnor and Cwm Tawe	WA	Wales	33.9	Con	9091	72.5	24368	9164	15277	221	964	0	1692	590	52276
Bridgend	WA	Wales	46.2	Con	2553	66.0	20531	17978	2453	868	2437	0	2441	0	46708
Caerfyrddin	WA	Wales	57.6	Con	4529	73.4	20891	13380	686	0	2023	0	16362	0	53342
Caerphilly	WA	Wales	30.8	Lab	6901	62.2	12882	19783	323	164	5287	0	6630	0	45069
Cardiff East	WA	Wales	63.9	Lab	17,079	64.6	10626	27705	5752	300	1617	0	294	487	46,781
Cardiff North	WA	Wales	4.3	Lab	7579	76.9	19551	27130	3582	820	1450	0	1888	288	54709
Cardiff South and Penarth	WA	Wales	57.4	Lab	11851	69.7	15179	27030	3528	1153	1389	0	2091	0	50370
Cardiff West	WA	Wales	8.9	Lab	10546	70.2	15505	26051	2749	1141	1917	0	4419	159	51941
Ceredigion Preseli	WA	Wales	31.9	PC	1443	69.8	14602	10733	7561	663	2063	0	16045	0	51667
Clwyd East	WA	Wales	85.9	Con	5284	69.1	25324	20040	2823	0	2173	0	2460	0	52820
Clwyd North	WA	Wales	92.2	Con	2834	67.4	23479	20645	2501	0	951	0	3713	0	51289
Dwyfor Meirionnydd	WA	Wales	62.7	PC	9880	69.6	13230	11541	79	0	2558	0	23110	0	50518
Gower	WA	Wales	50.4	Lab	3181	70.6	21631	24812	3182	2	1863	0	2741	0	54231
Llanelli	WA	Wales	15.0	Lab	3793	62.8	13463	17256	0	0	3893	0	9280	0	43892
Merthyr Tydfil and Aberdare	WA	Wales	72.9	Lab	13410	57.6	8882	22292	1434	0	4621	0	3513	2364	43106
Mid and South Pembrokeshire	WA	Wales	89.1	Con	8621	71.6	29072	20451	2531	0	0	0	2917	0	54971
Monmouthshire	WA	Wales	32.0	Con	10837	72.7	27568	16731	5071	1333	451	0	1283	435	52872
Montgomeryshire and Glyndŵr	WA	Wales	51.2	Con	14765	69.0	27466	12701	8595	0	700	0	1019	727	51208
Neath and Swansea East	WA	Wales	95.7	Lab	8,451	60.0	12651	21102	1849	776	3965	0	3820	661	44,824
Newport East	WA	Wales	75.0	Lab	5239	60.9	16799	22038	2651	871	2843	0	1203	0	46405
Newport West and Islwyn	WA	Wales	93.7	Lab	2001	63.7	18285	20286	2474	947	4301	0	2244	0	48537
Pontypridd	WA	Wales	80.2	Lab	8798	61.8	12456	21254	639	101	3855	0	4963	2311	45579
Rhondda and Ogmore	WA	Wales	46.3	Lab	17377	57.8	6572	23949	969	590	4902	0	5290	277	42549
Swansea West	WA	Wales	97.1	Lab	10037	59.2	12672	22709	2834	367	3022	0	2595	0	44199
Torfaen	WA	Wales	12.6	Lab	4110	61.7	14506	18616	2157	966	5742	0	1566	0	43553
Vale of Glamorgan	WA	Wales	8.3	Con	2566	71.0	24535	21969	0	2981	0	0	0	508	49993
Wrexham	WA	Wales	42.4	Con	3939	66.4	21933	17994	2013	445	1778	0	2960	0	47123
Ynys Môn	WA	Wales	none	Con	1968	69.7	12959	10991	0	0	2184	0	10418	0	36552

=== Northern Ireland ===
Constituency	Change	2019 winning party	Majority	Turnout	DUP	SF	APNI	SDLP	UUP	Aontú	PBP	Con	Grn	Other	Total	
Constituency	Change	2019 winning party	Majority	Turnout	Belfast East	14.8	DUP	2626	64.4	21616		18990	1939	2581		45126
Belfast North	14.4	SF	3739	67.4	19419	23158	5099	225	161	16	57	5			48140	
Belfast South and Mid Down	22.3	SDLP	13322	66.2	12087	247	7348	25409	1703	568	67	167	73		47669	
Belfast West	17.5	SF	12997	59.6	7789	20786	3060	3195	370	1599	6059	41			42899	
East Antrim	13.7	DUP	6395	57.4	16818	3120	10423	1432	6671			1007	685		40156	
East Londonderry	4.0	DUP	9707	56.9	16456	6343	5970	6749	3756	1776	51				41101	
Fermanagh and South Tyrone	10.5	SF	510	69.2	896	21968	2784	3717	21458	61				751	51635	
Foyle	6.5	SDLP	16413	63.4	3852	9372	1189	25785	878	1949	1251				44276	
Lagan Valley	18.8	DUP	7475	59.9	19840	1994	12365	1855	8460			878		315	45707	
Mid Ulster	9.3	SF	9806	63.5	10566	20372	3395	6194	3317					690	44534	
Newry and Armagh	13.0	SF	9673	62.4	9415	19088	3913	9019	3605	1531					46571	
North Antrim	11.4	DUP	13765	57.1	20650	4609	5811	2404	6885			17		246	40622	
North Down	4.7	All	2641	60.7	16541		19182		5075			1959			42757	
South Antrim	5.7	DUP	3036	59.6	15432	4858	7837	2113	12396	3	11	18			42668	
South Down	19.2	SF	1623	62.7	8162	13863	6212	12240	3460	1070					45007	
Strangford	21.8	DUP	5677	56.8	16128	3017	10451	4002	3677	193		1341	717	308	39834	
Upper Bann	16.4	DUP	7477	60.3	18931	11454	5880	4351	5788	38					46442	
West Tyrone	6.1	SF	8074	62.2	9530	17604	4206	8108	2882	1010	30		521		43891	

=== Precisely known results ===
Thanks to the City of Wolverhampton Council and Walsall Council deciding to publish results of the 2019 general election by ward, and the three new Wolverhampton constituencies not containing ward splits, the exact result of the election is known in those three seats. However, these results are not generally used by news organizations, which use Rallings and Thrasher's estimates nationwide.

Constituency	Party	Majority	Votes						
Constituency	Party	Majority	Con	Lab	LD	Grn	Brx	Other	Total
Wolverhampton North East	Con	8,259	22,787	14,528	1,211	673	1,150	0	40,349
Wolverhampton South East	Con	545	17,952	17,407	1,279	543	2,229	54	39,464
Wolverhampton West	Con	45	23,587	23,542	2,359	188	1,437	0	51,113

== See also ==
- Results of the 2019 United Kingdom general election
- List of United Kingdom Parliament constituencies (2024–present) by region
