= Local Government Chronicle =

British weekly magazine

- Cover of Local Government Chronicle, March 2023
- Editor: Sarah Calkin
- Categories: Government officers trade publication
- Frequency: Weekly
- Publisher: Metropolis International
- Founder: Charles Knight
- Founded: 1855 (171 years ago)
- Country: United Kingdom
- Based in: London, England
- Language: English
- Website: lgcplus.com
- OCLC: 64222139

The Local Government Chronicle (LGC) is a British weekly magazine for local government officers, and is published by Metropolis. The magazine was launched in 1855 by bookseller and publisher Charles Knight. It was then published by Emap, now Metropolis. It is politically independent.

== Coverage ==
Subjects LGC covers include finance, law, management, housing, planning, regeneration, the environment, education, big society, local elections, the third sector and social services. Sarah Calkin is its editor. It features contributions from analysts including Tony Travers from the London School of Economics, a weekly anonymous columnist ("LGC Insider") and various governmental figures.

=== Elections ===
It provides comprehensive local election coverage each year, in the form of rolling online results, expert analysis from Professors Colin Rallings and Michael Thrasher from Plymouth University, political reaction, and a council control map.

== Events ==
Among its other activities, LGC runs the first national awards to be launched for local government, the LGC Awards for Excellence. It also launched the Business Partnership Awards, which reward private contractors who work with local authorities in the UK to deliver services; and a large number of public sector conferences.

The LGC Council of the Year has been:

- 2019: Wigan Metropolitan Borough Council
- 2018: Barking and Dagenham London Borough Council
- 2017: Sevenoaks District Council

== See also ==
- List of magazines in the United Kingdom
