= Colin Rallings =

British academic

Colin Rallings is a British academic, Professor of Politics in the School of Sociology, Politics & Law at the University of Plymouth. Rallings’ first degree was in Politics and Modern History from the University of Manchester. Subsequently, he was awarded a master's degree in Politics by the University of Strathclyde and, in 1979, a Ph.D. by the University of Essex for a thesis on electoral behaviour. He joined the then Plymouth Polytechnic in 1976, being appointed Professor of Politics in 1997. He has held visiting appointments at the University of Leiden, the University of North Carolina at Chapel Hill, the University of Queensland, and the Australian National University, Canberra. He is a member of the Economic and Social Research Council's (ESRC) panel of assessors for Politics and International Relations, and of the Council's Research Resources Board.

With his colleague Michael Thrasher, Rallings has written extensively on electoral systems, results and British politics. He is Co-Director of the Local Government Chronicle Elections Centre. Rallings has also appeared on ITN's ITV News election coverage on numerous occasions since the start of the 21st century.

== Books ==
- C. Rallings & M. Thrasher (eds) Media Guide to the New Parliamentary Constituencies, (Plymouth: LGC Elections Centre, 2007) https://web.archive.org/web/20070206043126/http://www.research.plymouth.ac.uk/elections/elections/media_guide_to_the_new_parliamen.htm
- C. Rallings & M. Thrasher, The 2006 Local Elections Handbook, (Plymouth: LGC Elections Centre, 2006) ISBN 0-948858-41-9.
- C. Rallings & M. Thrasher, The 2005 Local Elections Handbook, (Plymouth: LGC Elections Centre, 2005)
- C. Rallings & M. Thrasher, The 2004 Local Elections Handbook, (Plymouth: LGC Elections Centre, 2004)
- C. Rallings, D. Denver & M. Thrasher, The Media Guide to the New Scottish Westminster Parliamentary Constituencies, (Plymouth: LGC Elections Centre, 2004)
- C. Rallings, M. Thrasher (& others), Public Opinion and the 2004 elections, (London: The Electoral Commission, 2003)
- C. Rallings, M. Thrasher, & G. Borisyuk, The cycle of local government elections in England, (London: The Electoral Commission, 2003)
- C. Rallings & M. Thrasher, Local Elections in Britain: A Statistical Digest, (Plymouth: LGC Elections Centre, 2003)
- C. Rallings, M. Thrasher, et al. One Vote, One Value. (Aldershot: Ashgate, 2002)
- Electoral Commission, Compiled by Colin Rallings & Michael Thrasher, Election 2001 - The Official Results, (London: Politicos, 2001)
- Rallings, C. and M. Thrasher. Patterns of Voting in Parliamentary Constituencies 1990-2000. (Plymouth: LGC Elections Centre, University of Plymouth, 2001)
- C. Rallings & M. Thrasher, Elections – the 21st century model: An evaluation of May 2000 local electoral pilots (London: Local Government Association, 2000)
- C. Rallings & M. Thrasher, British Electoral Facts: 1832-1999, (Aldershot: Ashgate, 2000)
- C. Rallings, M. Thrasher & G. Stoker, Proportional Representation in Local Government: Lessons from Europe, (Joseph Rowntree Foundation: York Publishing Services, 2000)
- C. Rallings & M. Thrasher, New Britain: New Elections, (London: Vacher Dod, 1999)
- C. Rallings & M. Thrasher, British Parliamentary Election Results 1983-1997, (Aldershot: Ashgate, 1999)
- C. Rallings & M. Thrasher, Britain Votes 6, (Aldershot: Ashgate 1998)
- C. Rallings & M. Thrasher, Local Elections in Britain, (London: Routledge, 1997)
- C. Rallings, M. Thrasher & J. Downe, Enhancing Local Electoral Turnout : A guide to current practice and future reform (York Publishing Service, 1996)
- C. Rallings & M. Thrasher, Local Voting and the New Parliamentary Constituencies, (Plymouth: LGC Elections Centre, 1996)
- C. Rallings & M. Thrasher, The Media Guide to the New Parliamentary Constituencies, (Plymouth: LGC Elections Centre, 1995)
