= Michael Thrasher =

British academic

Michael Thrasher is a British academic, Professor of Politics in the School of Sociology, Politics & Law at the University of Plymouth. He is also Sky News' election analyst.

Thrasher was born in Stoke-on-Trent, Staffordshire in 1953. he received his BA in politics from the University of Liverpool in 1974. He remained in Liverpool to study for his doctoral thesis, "The political theory of English local government, 1834-1972". He was awarded his Ph.D. in 1981. He began lecturing at Plymouth in 1977, becoming Professor of Politics in 1997. He is co-director of the Local Government Chronicle Elections Centre.

With his colleague Colin Rallings, Thrasher has written extensively on electoral systems, results and British politics. He is co-director of the Local Government Chronicle Elections Centre. Thrasher appeared on Sky News' 2017 election coverage, and has appeared on the channel's election night coverage as a psephologist for every election since 1992.

== Books ==
- C. Rallings & M. Thrasher, The 2005 Local Elections Handbook, (Plymouth: LGC Elections Centre, 2005)
- C. Rallings & M. Thrasher, The 2004 Local Elections Handbook, (Plymouth: LGC Elections Centre, 2004)
- C. Rallings, D. Denver & M. Thrasher, The Media Guide to the New Scottish Westminster Parliamentary Constituencies, (Plymouth: LGC Elections Centre, 2004)
- C. Rallings, M. Thrasher (& others), Public Opinion and the 2004 elections, (London: The Electoral Commission, 2003)
- C. Rallings, M. Thrasher, & G. Borisyuk, The cycle of local government elections in England, (London: The Electoral Commission, 2003)
- C. Rallings & M. Thrasher, Local Elections in Britain: A Statistical Digest, (Plymouth: LGC Elections Centre, 2003)
- C. Rallings, M. Thrasher, et al. One Vote, One Value. (Aldershot: Ashgate, 2002)
- Electoral Commission, Compiled by Colin Rallings & Michael Thrasher, Election 2001 - The Official Results, (London: Politicos, 2001)
- Rallings, C. and M. Thrasher. Patterns of Voting in Parliamentary Constituencies 1990-2000. (Plymouth: LGC Elections Centre, University of Plymouth, 2001)
- C. Rallings & M. Thrasher, Elections – the 21st century model: An evaluation of May 2000 local electoral pilots (London: Local Government Association, 2000)
- C. Rallings & M. Thrasher, British Electoral Facts: 1832-1999, (Aldershot: Ashgate, 2000)
- C. Rallings, M. Thrasher & G. Stoker, Proportional Representation in Local Government: Lessons from Europe, (Joseph Rowntree Foundation: York Publishing Services, 2000)
- C. Rallings & M. Thrasher, New Britain: New Elections, (London: Vacher Dod, 1999)
- C. Rallings & M. Thrasher, British Parliamentary Election Results 1983-1997, (Aldershot: Ashgate, 1999)
- C. Rallings & M. Thrasher, Britain Votes 6, (Aldershot: Ashgate 1998)
- C. Rallings & M. Thrasher, Local Elections in Britain, (London: Routledge, 1997)
- C. Rallings, M. Thrasher & J. Downe, Enhancing Local Electoral Turnout : A guide to current practice and future reform (York Publishing Service, 1996)
- C. Rallings & M. Thrasher, Local Voting and the New Parliamentary Constituencies, (Plymouth: LGC Elections Centre, 1996)
- C. Rallings & M. Thrasher, The Media Guide to the New Parliamentary Constituencies, (Plymouth: LGC Elections Centre, 1995)
