= Edward Baldwin, 4th Earl Baldwin of Bewdley =

British hereditary peer (1938–2021)

The Right Honourable The Earl Baldwin of Bewdley

Member of the House of Lords
- Lord Temporal
- Hereditary peerage 15 November 1977 – 11 November 1999
- Preceded by: The 3rd Earl Baldwin of Bewdley
- Succeeded by: Seat abolished
- Elected Hereditary Peer; 11 November 1999 – 9 May 2018
- Election: 1999
- Preceded by: Seat established
- Succeeded by: The 19th Earl of Devon

Personal details
- Born: 3 January 1938 Martley, Worcestershire, England
- Died: 16 June 2021 (aged 83)
- Party: Crossbench
- Spouses: Sarah James (m. 1970; died 2001) Lydia Segrave (m. 2015)
- Relations: Stanley Baldwin (grandfather); Charles Alexander Tomes (grandfather)
- Children: 3
- Education: Trinity College, Cambridge

Edward Alfred Alexander Baldwin, 4th Earl Baldwin of Bewdley (3 January 1938 – 16 June 2021) was a British educator, hereditary peer, and Crossbench member of the House of Lords.

== Early life and education ==
Baldwin was born on 3 January 1938. He was the only child of Arthur Baldwin, 3rd Earl Baldwin of Bewdley and the former Joan Elspeth Tomes (1901–1980). His paternal grandparents were Lucy Baldwin and Stanley Baldwin, 1st Earl Baldwin of Bewdley, three-time Prime Minister of the United Kingdom. His maternal grandparents were Harriot (née Hancock) Tomes and Charles Alexander Tomes, an American-born merchant in the Far East with Shewan, Tomes & Co.

Baldwin was educated at Eton College and Trinity College, Cambridge, where he studied modern languages and law.

== Career ==
Before entering Trinity College, Baldwin served from 1956 until 1958 as a second lieutenant in the Intelligence Corps. Between 1970 and 1987, he served in a variety of education positions, initially as a school teacher (teaching German and French) and latterly as Area Education Officer for Oxfordshire from 1980 to 1987.

In 1977, Baldwin became a member of the House of Lords and was one of the ninety elected hereditary peers who remained after the passing of the House of Lords Act 1999. From 1990 to 1998, he was Chairman of the British Acupuncture Accreditation Board.

While in the House of Lords, he was Joint Chairman of Parliamentary Group for Alternative and Complementary Medicine from 1992 to 2002. Baldwin was also a member of the Select Committee of Inquiry into Complementary and Alternative Medicine in 2000. From 2005 to 2010, he was Joint Chairman of the All Party Parliamentary Group Against Fluoridation. In addition, Baldwin was Secretary of the Associate Parliamentary Food and Health Forum.

Baldwin sat as a crossbencher until retiring under the House of Lords Reform Act 2014 in May 2018.

Baldwin spent much time trying to clear the name of his grandfather, Stanley Baldwin, whose character, motivation and actions as prime minister were questioned after the outbreak of World War II. He was particularly unhappy with the film The King's Speech due to its factual distortions and portrayal of his grandfather as a dithering fool who misunderstood Hitler's intentions.

== Personal life and death ==
In 1970, Baldwin married Sarah MacMurray, the eldest daughter of Evan James of Upwood Park in Abingdon, County of Berkshire. They lived at Manor Farm House in Upper Wolvercote, Oxford, and were the parents of three sons:

- Benedict Alexander Stanley Baldwin, 5th Earl Baldwin of Bewdley (born 28 December 1973)
- Hon. James Conrad Baldwin (born 13 March 1976)
- Hon. Mark Thomas Maitland Baldwin (born 24 July 1980)

Sarah died in 2001. In 2015, Baldwin married sculptor Lydia Segrave, the widow of economist Ian Little.

Baldwin was a member of the Marylebone Cricket Club. He lived in Cumnor Hill, near Oxford.

Lord Baldwin died on 16 June 2021, aged 83. He was succeeded in the earldom and viscountcy by his eldest son, Benedict.

== Works ==
- Philip Williamson; Edward Baldwin, eds. (2004). Baldwin Papers: A Conservative Statesman, 1908-1947. University of Durham. ISBN 978-0-521-58080-9.

== Arms ==
Coat of arms of Edward Baldwin, 4th Earl Baldwin of Bewdley
Coronet A Coronet of an Earl Crest A Cockatrice sejant wings addorsed Argent combed wattled and beaked Or gorged with a Crown Vallary lined and reflexed over the back Gold and charged on the shoulder with a Rose Gules barbed and seeded proper Escutcheon Argent on a Saltire Sable a Quatrefoil Or Supporters On either side a White Owl proper, that on the sinister holding in the beak a Sprig of Broom also proper Motto Per Deum Meum Transilio Murum (With the help of my God I leap over the wall)

Peerage of the United Kingdom
Preceded by Arthur Baldwin	Earl Baldwin of Bewdley; 1976–2021; Member of the House of Lords (1977–1999)	Succeeded by Benedict Baldwin
Parliament of the United Kingdom
New office created by the House of Lords Act 1999	Elected hereditary peer to the House of Lords under the House of Lords Act 1999; 1999–2018	Succeeded by The Earl of Devon
