= Governor Baldwin =

Governor Baldwin may refer to:

- Henry P. Baldwin (1814–1892), 15th Governor of Michigan
- Oliver Baldwin, 2nd Earl Baldwin of Bewdley (1899–1958), Governor of the Leeward Islands from 1948 to 1950
- Raymond E. Baldwin (1893–1986), 72nd and 74th Governor of Connecticut
- Roger Sherman Baldwin (1793–1863), 32nd Governor of Connecticut
- Simeon E. Baldwin (1840–1927), 65th Governor of Connecticut
