= Arthur Baldwin, 3rd Earl Baldwin of Bewdley =

British businessman, RAF officer, and author

The Right Honourable The Earl Baldwin of Bewdley

Member of the House of Lords Lord Temporal
- In office 10 August 1958 – 5 July 1976; Hereditary Peerage
- Preceded by: The 2nd Earl Baldwin of Bewdley
- Succeeded by: The 4th Earl Baldwin of Bewdley

Personal details
- Born: 22 March 1904 Kensington, London, England
- Died: 5 July 1976 (aged 72) Cheltenham, Gloucestershire, England
- Spouse: Joan Elspeth Tomes (m. 1936)
- Relations: Oliver Baldwin, 2nd Earl Baldwin of Bewdley (brother)
- Children: Edward Baldwin, 4th Earl Baldwin of Bewdley
- Parents: Stanley Baldwin (father); Lucy Ridsdale (mother)
- Education: Trinity College, Cambridge

Arthur Windham Baldwin, 3rd Earl Baldwin of Bewdley (22 March 1904 – 5 July 1976) was a British businessman, RAF officer, and author. His books included a combative defence of the posthumous reputation of his father, Stanley Baldwin, the former prime minister of the UK, in which he severely criticised several leading historians of the time.

== Early life ==
Baldwin was the younger son of Stanley Baldwin, later 1st Earl of Baldwin of Bewdley, and his wife, Lucy, née Ridsdale. He was known to his family and friends by the nickname "Bloggs".

He was educated at Eton College and Trinity College, Cambridge.

== Career ==
In the inter-war years Baldwin was a director of several companies, including the Round Oak Steel Works, Redpath, Brown, and the Great Western Railway, and between 1938 and 1974 he was a director of the Equitable Life Assurance Society. He served in the Royal Air Force during World War II. Despising patronage, he successfully set out to gain a commission through the ranks.

Baldwin published three books in the 1950s and 60s. The first was a biography of his father, written as a result of his strong feeling that the official biography by G. M. Young did not do Stanley Baldwin justice. (Note: Young's publisher, Rupert Hart-Davis, admitted privately that Young had not been diligent in his research and had to be bullied into completing the manuscript.) Baldwin strongly criticised not only Young, but other historians, including John Wheeler-Bennett, D. C. Somervell and Sir Lewis Namier for, in his view, misjudging the former prime minister. His second book, The Macdonald Sisters was a study of the four daughters of the Rev G. B. Macdonald: Alice married John Lockwood Kipling (Rudyard Kipling's parents); Georgiana married Edward Burne-Jones; Agnes married Edward Poynter; and Louisa married Alfred Baldwin (Stanley Baldwin's parents, thus Windham's grandparents). In 1967 he published a memoir of his wartime experiences. The reviewer in The Times, commented, "He tells it all with amusement and skill … the atmosphere of the RAF seeps unmistakably through."

=== Peerage ===
On 10 August 1958, on the death of the second earl, his elder brother, Oliver, Baldwin succeeded to the United Kingdom titles of Earl Baldwin of Bewdley and Viscount Corvedale. He spoke in the House of Lords from time to time, mostly on the subjects of transport and industry.

== Personal life ==
On 25 August 1936, Baldwin married Joan Elspeth Tomes, daughter of Charles Alexander Tomes, an American merchant in the Far East with Shewan, Tomes & Co. They had one child:

- Edward Alfred Alexander Baldwin, 4th Earl Baldwin of Bewdley, (3 January 1938 – 16 June 2021)

The 3rd Earl Baldwin of Bewdley died on 5 July 1976, aged 72. The Countess Baldwin of Bewdley died in 1980.

== Arms ==
Coat of arms of Arthur Baldwin, 3rd Earl Baldwin of Bewdley
Coronet A Coronet of an Earl Crest A Cockatrice sejant wings addorsed Argent combed wattled and beaked Or gorged with a Crown Vallary lined and reflexed over the back Gold and charged on the shoulder with a Rose Gules barbed and seeded proper Escutcheon Argent on a Saltire Sable a Quatrefoil Or Supporters On either side a White Owl proper, that on the sinister holding in the beak a Sprig of Broom also proper Motto Per Deum Meum Transilio Murum (With the help of my God I leap over the wall)

== Works ==
- My Father: The True Story. London: G Allen and Unwin. 1955. OCLC 458593350.
- The Macdonald Sisters. London: P Davies. 1960. OCLC 1667706.
- A Flying Start. London: P Davies. 1967. OCLC 5058823.

== Notes, references and sources ==
Notes

Sources

- Lyttelton, George; Rupert Hart-Davis (1978). Lyttelton/Hart-Davis Letters, Volume 1. London: John Murray. ISBN 978-0-7195-3478-2.
- Neville, Peter (2006). Hitler and appeasement : the British attempt to prevent the Second World War. London: Hambledon Continuum. ISBN 978-1-85285-369-3.

Peerage of the United Kingdom
Preceded by Oliver Baldwin	Earl Baldwin of Bewdley; 1958 – 1976	Succeeded by Edward Baldwin
