= Earl Baldwin of Bewdley =

British peerage title created in 1937 for Stanley Baldwin

Earldom Baldwin of Bewdley
- Arms of the Earl Baldwin of Bewdley
- Creation date: 8 June 1937
- Created by: King George VI
- Peerage: Peerage of the United Kingdom
- First holder: Stanley Baldwin
- Present holder: Benedict Baldwin, 5th Earl Baldwin of Bewdley
- Heir presumptive: James Conrad Baldwin
- Remainder to: 1st Earl's heirs male of the body lawfully begotten
- Subsidiary titles: Viscount Corvedale
- Seat: Manor Farm House
- Former seat: Astley Hall
- Motto: With the help of my God I leap over the wall

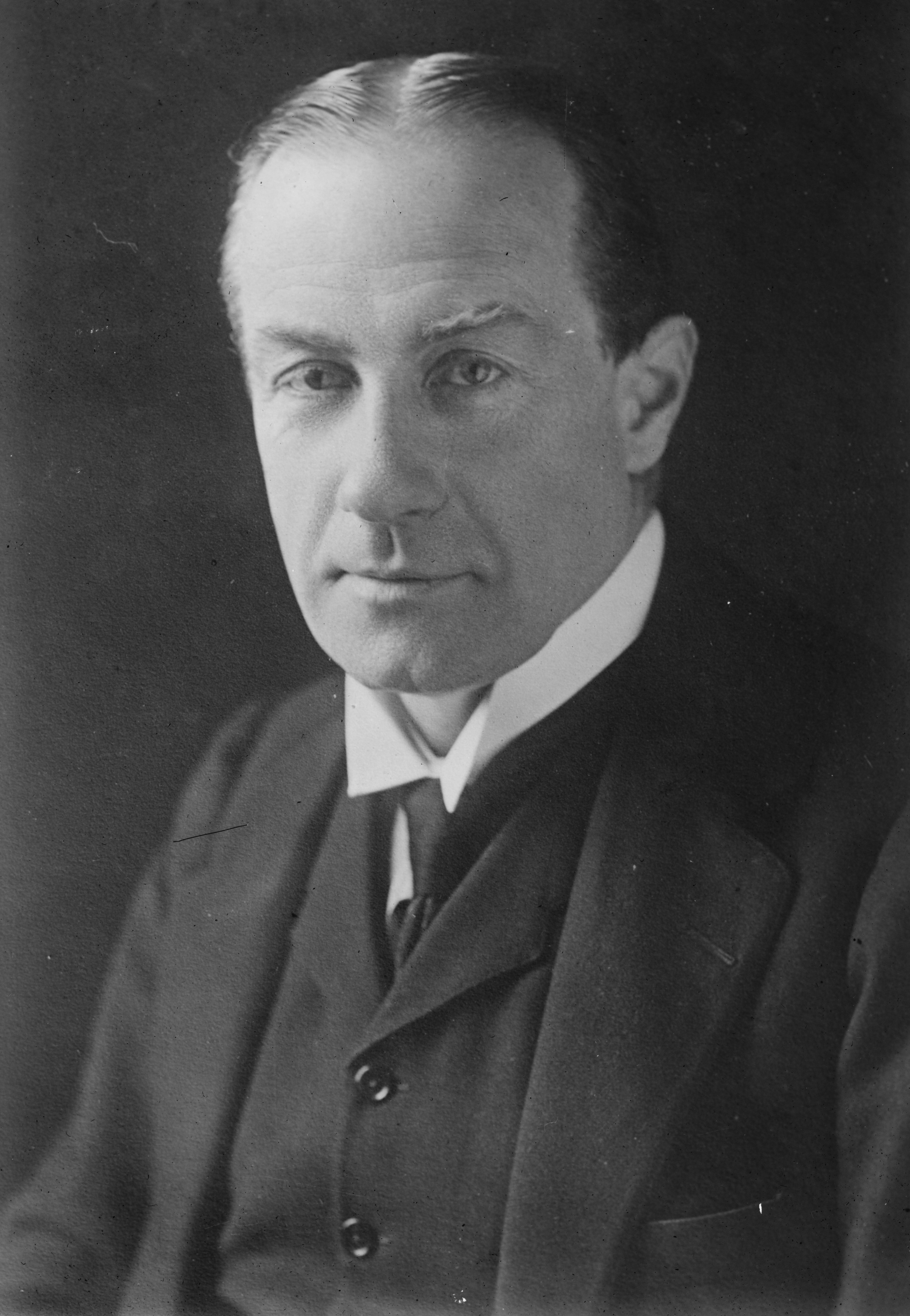
Stanley Baldwin, 1st Earl Baldwin of Bewdley

Earl Baldwin of Bewdley is a title in the Peerage of the United Kingdom. It was created in 1937 for the Conservative politician Stanley Baldwin, who had served as MP for Bewdley from 1908 to 1937 and was Prime Minister of the United Kingdom three times (from 1923 to 1924, from 1924 to 1929 and from 1935 to 1937). He was made Viscount Corvedale, of Corvedale in the County of Salop, at the same time he was given the earldom.

The first Earl Baldwin of Bewdley was succeeded by his eldest son, Oliver. A somewhat controversial figure, the second Earl was a Labour Party Member of Parliament and for a time sat opposite his father in the House of Commons. Oliver had no children, so on his death the title passed to his younger brother, Arthur, the third Earl.

The peerage was held by Arthur's son, Edward, the fourth Earl, who succeeded in 1976. He became one of the ninety elected hereditary peers that remain in the House of Lords after the passing of the House of Lords Act 1999, and sat as a cross-bencher until retiring under the House of Lords Reform Act 2014 in May 2018.

Alfred Baldwin, father of the first Earl, was also a politician.

The family seat was Astley Hall near Astley, Worcestershire, and is now Manor Farm House near Wolvercote, Oxfordshire.

== Earls Baldwin of Bewdley (1937) ==
- Stanley Baldwin, 1st Earl Baldwin of Bewdley (1867–1947) - formerly Prime Minister of the United Kingdom under Kings George V, Edward VIII, and George VI
- Oliver Ridsdale Baldwin, 2nd Earl Baldwin of Bewdley (1899–1958), first son of the 1st Earl
- Arthur Windham Baldwin, 3rd Earl Baldwin of Bewdley (1904–1976), second son of the 1st Earl
- Edward Alfred Alexander Baldwin, 4th Earl Baldwin of Bewdley (1938–2021), only son of the 3rd Earl
- Benedict Alexander Stanley Baldwin, 5th Earl Baldwin of Bewdley (b. 1973)

== Present peer ==
Benedict Alexander Stanley Baldwin, 5th Earl Baldwin of Bewdley (born 28 December 1973) is the eldest of the three sons of the 4th Earl and his wife Sarah MacMurray James. Styled formally as Viscount Corvedale from 1976, he was educated at Bryanston School and Newcastle University, where he graduated B.Mus.

On 16 June 2021, Corvedale succeeded his father as Earl Baldwin and Viscount Corvedale.

The heir presumptive is Earl Baldwin's brother, James Conrad Baldwin (born 1976).

== Arms ==
Coat of arms of Earl Baldwin of Bewdley
Coronet A Coronet of an Earl Crest A Cockatrice sejant wings addorsed Argent combed wattled and beaked Or gorged with a Crown Vallary lined and reflexed over the back Gold and charged on the shoulder with a Rose Gules barbed and seeded proper Escutcheon Argent on a Saltire Sable a Quatrefoil Or Supporters On either side a White Owl proper, that on the sinister holding in the beak a Sprig of Broom also proper Motto Per Deum Meum Transilio Murum (With the help of my God I leap over the wall)

== Line of succession ==
- Edward Alfred Alexander Baldwin, 4th Earl Baldwin of Bewdley (1938–2021) Rep. Peer 1999–2018, followed by The Earl of Devon
  - Benedict Alexander Stanley Baldwin, 5th Earl Baldwin of Bewdley (born 1973)
  - (1). Hon. James Conrad Baldwin (b. 1976)
  - (2). Hon. Mark Thomas Maitland Baldwin (b. 1980)
