= Lucy Baldwin =

English writer, activist, wife of PM Stanley Baldwin

The Right Honourable The Countess Baldwin of Bewdley GBE DStJ
- Lady Baldwin in 1935
- Born: Lucy Ridsdale; 19 June 1869; London, England
- Died: 17 June 1945 (aged 75); Astley Hall, Worcestershire, England
- Resting place: Worcester Cathedral
- Known for: Spouse of the prime minister of the United Kingdom (1923–24; 1924–29; 1935–37)
- Spouse: Stanley Baldwin (m. 1892)
- Children: 7, including Oliver Ridsdale and Arthur Windham

Lucy Baldwin, Countess Baldwin of Bewdley GBE, DStJ (née Ridsdale; 19 June 1869 – 17 June 1945) was an English writer and activist for maternal health. From 1892 until her death in 1945, she was the wife of Stanley Baldwin, three-time Prime Minister of the United Kingdom. She was invested as a Dame of Grace, Order of Saint John of Jerusalem and a Dame Grand Cross, Order of the British Empire, and styled as Countess Baldwin of Bewdley on 8 June 1937.

== Family ==
She was born Lucy Ridsdale in Bayswater, London, the oldest daughter of Edward Lucas Jenks and Esther Lucy Ridsdale (née Thacker). Known as "Cissie", she grew up with her sister and three brothers in the village of Rottingdean, on the Sussex coast. Her brother Aurelian became a Member of Parliament for Brighton.

She married Stanley Baldwin on 12 September 1892 in Rottingdean. Among the attendees were Stanley's aunt Alice and her son, Rudyard Kipling. The couple had seven children:

- Unnamed son (stillborn January 1894);
- Lady Diana Lucy (born 8 April 1895 – 1982), married Capt Sir Richard Gordon Munro (divorced 1934) and Capt George Durant Kemp-Welch;
- Lady Leonora Stanley (10 July 1896 – 1989), married Sir Arthur Howard;
- Lady Pamela Margaret (16 September 1897 – 14 August 1976), married Sir Herbert Huntington-Whiteley, 2nd Baronet;
- Major Oliver Ridsdale Baldwin, 2nd Earl Baldwin of Bewdley (1 March 1899 – 10 August 1958);
- Lady Esther Louisa Baldwin (16 March 1902 – 1981);
- Arthur Windham Baldwin, 3rd Earl Baldwin of Bewdley (22 March 1904 – 5 July 1976), married Sarah MacMurray James.

== Interests and activities ==
As a girl, she was a member of the White Heather Club, the first women's cricket club, founded in 1887 at Nun Appleton Hall near Appleton Roebuck, Yorkshire. Stanley Baldwin met her while staying with his cousins, who were her neighbours, at Rottingdean, and reportedly fell in love with her while watching her score a half-century in a cricket match. She scored her career-best average of 62 in the year leading up to their marriage. She was also a competent billiards player.

Apart from her home-making and raising of six children, she was active and sociable, quite different from her husband in nature. Unlike her husband, she preferred the city life of London to the country. Their daughter Margaret Huntington-Whiteley said, "two people could not have been more unlike", but that "should they ever differ, it was always done quietly and politely." They shared the same deep Christian faith and moral outlook, and she was very supportive and encouraging of her husband. She often travelled with her husband during his time as prime minister, and she was an excellent speaker who found her own voice in politics.

She was involved in the Young Women's Christian Association and other charitable bodies for women, especially those concerned to improve maternity care, after having herself suffered difficult pregnancies and the loss of her first child. In 1928, she became vice-chairman of the newly established National Birthday Trust Fund to address the high incidence of maternal mortality. Its original aims were to support maternity hospitals and contribute to the development of midwifery practice. In 1929, she helped found the Anæsthetics Appeal Fund with speeches, broadcasts and fund-raising. She was particularly concerned with reducing the pain of childbirth, and lobbied for new funds to make anaesthesia affordable for low-income women. Her work contributed to the passage of the Midwives Act 1936. (See Royal College of Midwives.)

== Death ==
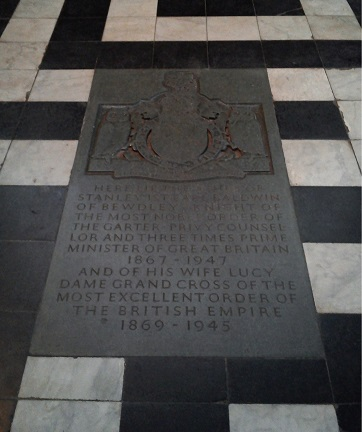
Worcester Cathedral, grave of the 1st Earl Baldwin of Bewdley and his wife Lucy, née Ridsdale

She died suddenly of a heart attack in 1945 at Astley Hall, their country home in Worcestershire. She was cremated and her ashes were interred, with those of her husband, after his death in 1947 in the nave of Worcester Cathedral.

== Legacy ==
In honour of her work for maternity care, philanthropist and cricket enthusiast Julien Cahn donated funds to build the Lucy Baldwin Maternity Hospital in Stourport-on-Severn, Worcestershire. It was commemorated by the prime minister on 16 April 1929, with a bronze dedication plaque over the main entrance reading "What she wanted most in the world. Presented to her by Julien Cahn Esq". It expanded beyond maternity and became known as the Lucy Baldwin Hospital until its closure in 2006.

In the 1960s, a new device that administered a combination of Nitrous oxide and oxygen for obstetrics, was named the Lucy Baldwin Apparatus For Obstetric Analgesia.

Baldwin also wrote valuable notes of two major events in politics, the fall of the Lloyd George ministry and the Abdication Crisis.
