= Oliver Baldwin, 2nd Earl Baldwin of Bewdley =

British politician (1899–1958)

The Right Honourable The Earl Baldwin of Bewdley

Member of the House of Lords Lord Temporal
- In office 14 December 1947 – 10 August 1958; Hereditary Peerage
- Preceded by: The 1st Earl Baldwin of Bewdley
- Succeeded by: The 3rd Earl Baldwin of Bewdley

Member of Parliament for Paisley
- In office 5 July 1945 – 14 December 1947
- Preceded by: Joseph Maclay
- Succeeded by: Douglas Johnston

Member of Parliament for Dudley
- In office 30 May 1929 – 7 October 1931
- Preceded by: Cyril Edward Lloyd
- Succeeded by: Dudley Jack Barnato Joel

Personal details
- Born: 1 March 1899 St Ermin's Mansions, London, England
- Died: 10 August 1958 (aged 59) Mile End, London, England
- Party: Labour
- Domestic partner: John Boyle
- Parents: Stanley Baldwin; Lucy Ridsdale

Oliver Ridsdale Baldwin, 2nd Earl Baldwin of Bewdley (1 March 1899 – 10 August 1958), known as Viscount Corvedale from 1937 to 1947, was a British socialist politician who had a career at political odds with his father, the Conservative prime minister Stanley Baldwin.

Educated at Eton, which he hated, Baldwin left as soon as he could. After serving in the army during the First World War he undertook various jobs, including a brief appointment as an officer in the Armenian army, and wrote journalism and books on a range of topics. He served two terms as a Labour Member of Parliament between 1929 and 1947.

Baldwin never achieved ministerial office in Britain. His last post was as Governor of the Leeward Islands, from 1948 to 1950.

== Early years ==
Baldwin was born at his parents' London home in St Ermin's Mansions, St James's Park, London, and spent his early childhood in Worcestershire, first at Dunley Hall, near Stourport, Worcestershire, and then at Astley Hall near Stourport, after the Baldwin family moved there in 1902. Baldwin was one of six surviving children, and the elder surviving son of the businessman Stanley Baldwin and his wife Lucy, née Ridsdale.

The family-unit was emotionally close, and Baldwin's parents loving and supportive, though his father was, like many parents of that class at that time, not closely involved in his children's lives. Baldwin senior was elected a Conservative MP in 1908, and rose within fifteen years to become prime minister. He sent his son to Eton College, where the boy failed to fit in. He hated what he saw as the school's snobbery and cruelty, and to his teachers he appeared to be "full of silliness, egotism, un-divine discontent, contempt for others (and of course for authority, discipline, tradition etc)".

His Who's Who entry states that he was educated "in football at Eton; in other things, beginning to learn". He was keen to leave school and join the army to fight in the First World War, and was commissioned from his officer cadet unit as a second lieutenant in the Special Reserve of the Irish Guards on 27 June 1917. He did not join the fighting in France until June 1918, but then distinguished himself by his bravery. He was promoted to lieutenant on 27 December 1918 and relinquished his commission on 1 April 1920. His war service strengthened his idealism and increasingly socialist views.

== Career ==
=== Post-war and 1920s ===
After the war Baldwin served briefly as British Vice-Consul in Boulogne, and then travelled in north Africa. He refused to be supported by his father, and earned a living as a journalist and travel writer. A chance meeting in Alexandria led to an appointment as an infantry instructor in the newly independent Armenia, but soon after he took up the post in 1920 the democratic government collapsed and Baldwin was imprisoned by Bolshevik-backed revolutionaries. He was freed two months later when democracy was restored, but en route back to Britain he was arrested by the Turkish authorities, accused of spying for Soviet Russia. He was held for five months, in grim conditions, with execution a constant threat. He later wrote a book about his experiences, called Six Prisons and Two Revolutions. After his release Baldwin returned to Britain.

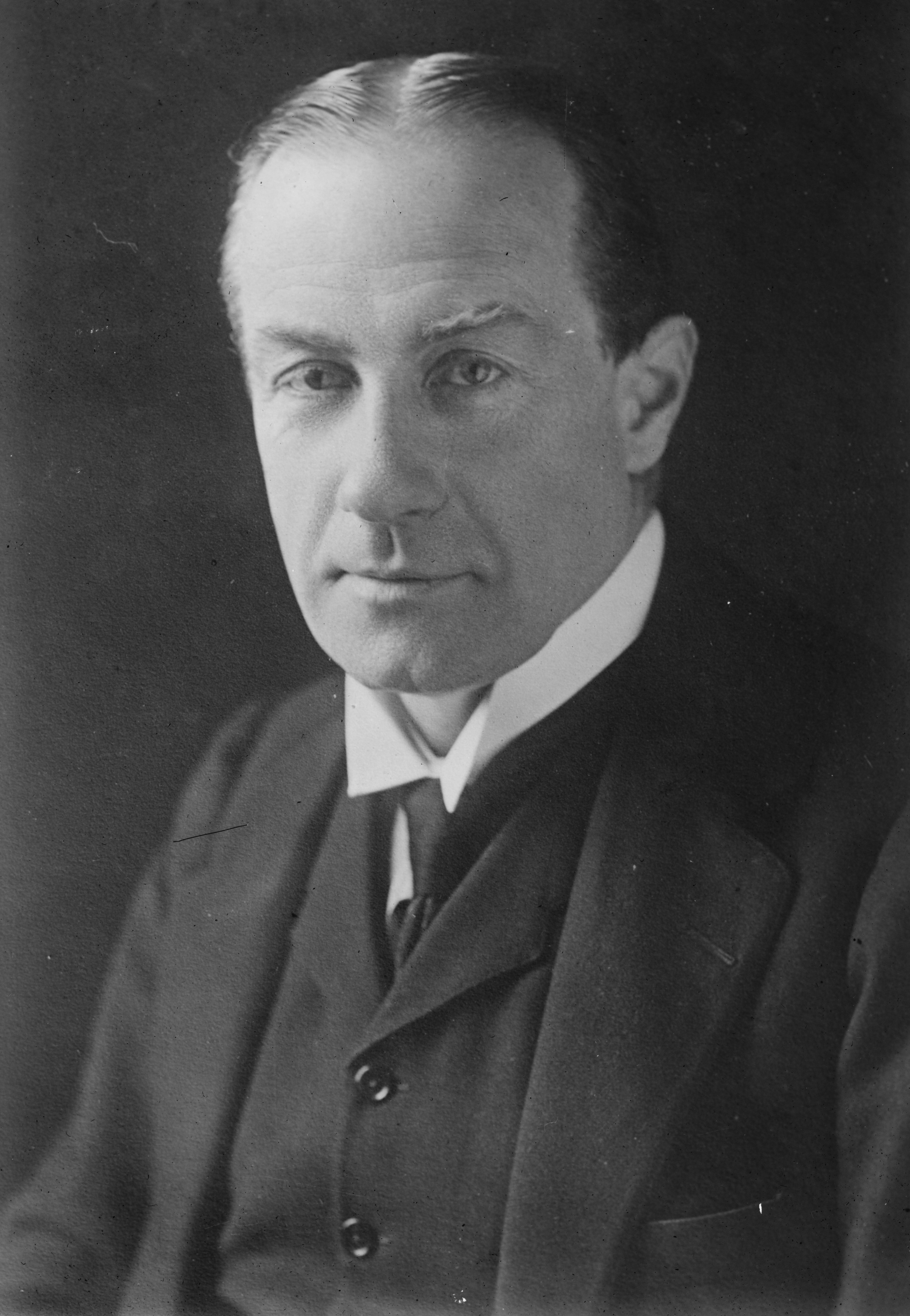
Baldwin's father, Stanley in the 1920s

In 1923, around this time, the leader of the Conservative Party and prime minister Bonar Law retired due to ill health. Baldwin's father, Stanley, already Chancellor of the Exchequer, became prime minister in Law's place. The younger Baldwin by now considered himself a committed socialist, and shortly after his father's elevation, he publicly declared his political beliefs, and broke off contact with his parents, much to their distress. At the 1924 general election Baldwin contested the seat of Dudley for the Labour Party, attracting press comment. He was unsuccessful; but Baldwin Snr, who had been out of power since the 1923 general election, returned to power for a second term as prime minister. Shortly afterwards, the breach between parents and son was patched up. Father and son remained on the warmest personal terms, assisted by agreement to avoid political discussions, and in politics Baldwin refrained from personally attacking his father.

At the 1929 election Baldwin won Dudley, and served as a backbench supporter of Ramsay MacDonald's Labour government. His father had lost the election, but remained an MP, and became Leader of the Opposition in the House of Commons; unusually, father and son now sat facing each other across the House of Commons. Baldwin Snr initially found it difficult to bear, telling one of his daughters that he ‘nearly died’ when he first saw Oliver sitting on the opposite benches to himself in the House of Commons, but matters were smoothed over by a letter Baldwin wrote to console his father: "Wherever I have gone on my political rounds during the past six years I have never heard any of our supporters speak other than in a kindly way of your personal self… To you, who have generally been victorious, the results may disappoint you, but take it from one who, until the other day, has always been on the losing side, always in the minority and generally alone, that victory or defeat are both flatterers and as such are of no serious consequence."

Like other young left-wing Labour MPs, Baldwin was critical of MacDonald's insistence on strict financial management and refusal to launch large Keynesian public works programmes. Early in 1931 Baldwin resigned from the Labour Party and was briefly associated with Oswald Mosley's New Party, but soon repudiated Mosley and rejoined Labour. When MacDonald formed the National Government, Stanley Baldwin and the Conservatives joined it; most Labour members, including Oliver Baldwin, did not. The 1931 general election resulted in a landslide win for the National Government and a disaster for Labour. Baldwin was among the casualties, defeated by a Conservative candidate, Sir Park Goff, who won by 19,991 votes to Baldwin's 10,837 at Chatham. Baldwin returned to journalism. In Walker's view, he was better known as a journalist than as a politician, writing anti-fascist articles in the usually pro-appeasement Rothermere press during the 1930s. He was for a time the BBC's film critic. He also wrote what the reviewer Andrew Lycett calls "a curious novel called The Coming of Aissa, which emphasised the socialistic leanings of Jesus within an agnostic, Asian, neoplatonic context."

=== Later years ===
Baldwin fought Paisley at the 1935 election, failing to be elected by 389 votes behind the Liberal candidate. In 1937 Stanley Baldwin retired from politics and was created Earl Baldwin of Bewdley. As a result, Oliver Baldwin acquired the courtesy title Viscount Corvedale, which did not entail membership of the House of Lords. In 1939, he rejoined the army, becoming a major in the Intelligence Corps and serving in the Near East and north Africa.

At the 1945 general election, when Labour returned to power under Clement Attlee, Corvedale was elected for Paisley with a majority of 10,330. The Attlee government lacked representation in the House of Lords, which was dominated by Conservative peers. In 1947, Corvedale accepted the prime minister's offer of a peerage, but before he could take his seat his father died and Corvedale was automatically elevated as the second Earl Baldwin. Lycett comments that had it not been for the first earl's death Baldwin father and son would, uniquely, have sat opposite each other in both houses of parliament.

==== Governor of the Leeward Islands 1948–1950 ====
In February 1948, Baldwin was appointed Governor and Commander in Chief of the Leeward Islands, a British colonial territory in the Caribbean, arriving there a month later.

His male life partner, Boyle, accompanied him, to the disapproval of some of the British establishment in Antigua. There were rumours of "strange and unnatural happenings at Government House" that were reinforced by complaints from naval captains whose crews had been commandeered by the governor for nude bathing sessions.

Partly for this reason, and partly because Baldwin made no secret of his continuing socialist views or his desire for multiracial inclusiveness, he was recalled in 1950.

== Personal life ==
In 1922, he was briefly engaged to Dorothea ("Doreen") Arbuthnot, the daughter of a political ally of his father. Coming to terms with the fact that he was homosexual, Baldwin broke off the engagement, and began a relationship with John "Johnnie" Parke Boyle (30 July 1893 – 24 February 1969), son of Major Charles Boyle, of Great Milton, Oxfordshire.

Described in The New Statesman as "a charming ne'er-do-well", Boyle, who was six years older than Baldwin, became his lifelong partner. Boyle and Baldwin set up home together in a farm in Oxfordshire owned by Boyle's brother in law, Lord Macclesfield, and living in what the biographer Christopher J Walker describes as "gentle, amicable, animal-loving, primitive, homosexual socialism". Though the two had to be careful and corresponded in code, they employed good-looking male staff and held weekend parties attended by vetted friends such as Harold Nicolson and Beverley Nichols.

Baldwin's family appears to have been accepting of the situation, apart from his father's first cousin, Rudyard Kipling, with whom Baldwin had been close, but who broke all contact on hearing of Baldwin's "beastliness". Baldwin Snr, though perhaps not Mrs Baldwin, probably recognised Baldwin and Boyle were a couple. Unusually for the period, both parents accepted Boyle's place in Baldwin's life. The elder Baldwin's letters to Boyle are addressed to "My Dear Johnny", a mark of favour, while Boyle won Mrs Baldwin over by showing her "in effect, the attentions of a dutiful son-in-law." During Baldwin Snr's time in office, the two elders would occasionally travel from the prime ministerial country retreat of Chequers to visit their son and his partner at their Oxfordshire farmhouse.

== Death ==
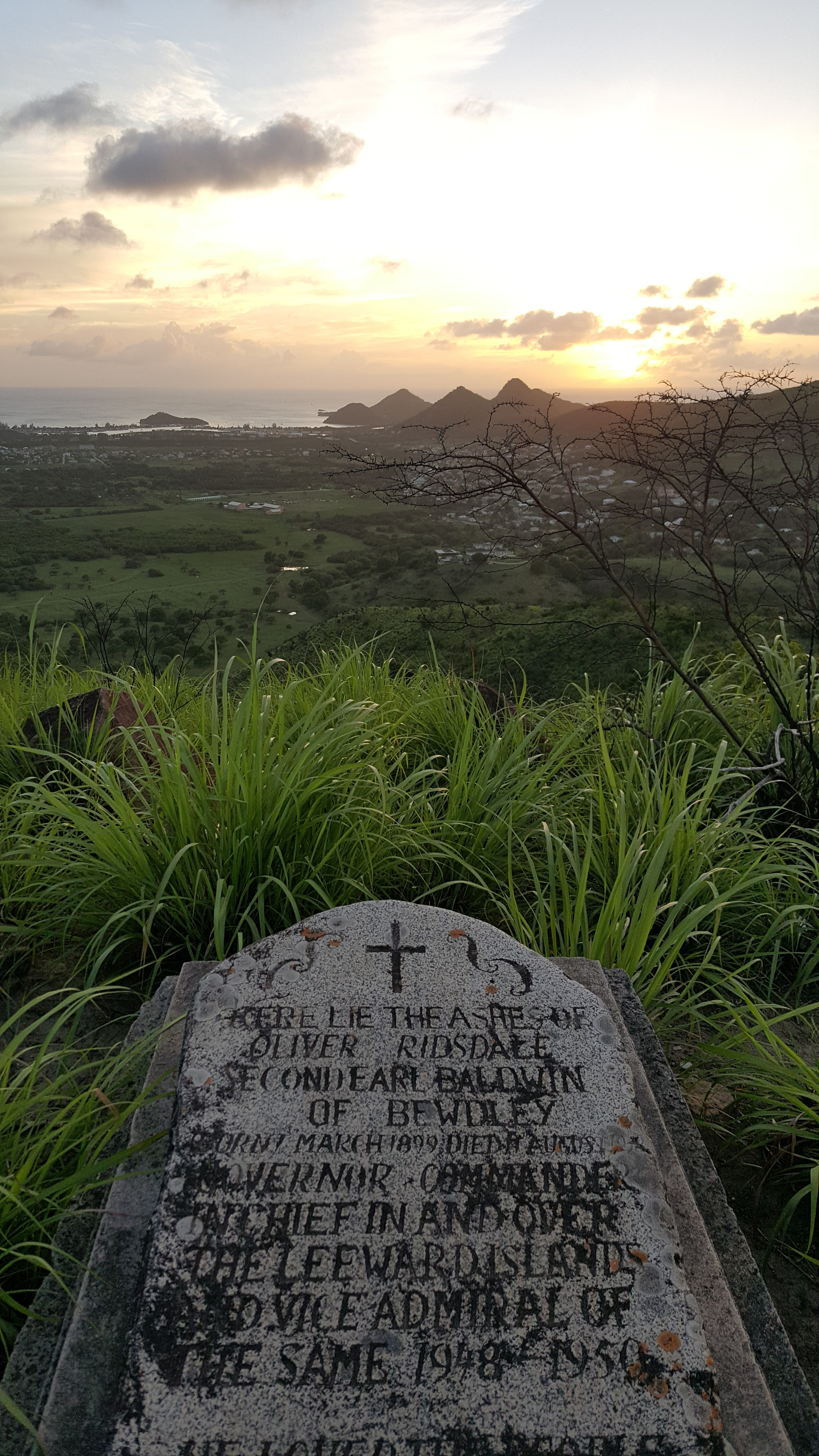
Baldwin's tombstone on a hilltop on the island of Antigua.

Baldwin died in Mile End Hospital, London, in 1958. Being childless, he was succeeded in the earldom and viscountcy by his younger brother Arthur. His ashes are interred on a hilltop on the island of Antigua. The stone inscription reads, Here lie the ashes of Oliver Ridsdale Second Earl Baldwin of Bewdley, Born March 1899 Died August 1958. Governor, Commander in Chief in and over the Leeward Islands and Vice Admiral of the same 1948 – 1950. He loved the people of these islands. RIP.

== Books ==
- Konyetz: novel published under the pen name Martin Hussingtree, 1924
- Six Prisons and Two Revolutions: memoirs, 1924
- Socialism and the Bible (English translation of Les Principes du catholicisme social en face de l'Ecriture sainte by Jean-Samuel Ouvret), 1928
- Conservatism and Wealth: A Radical Indictment (with Roger Chance), 1929
- The Questing Beast: An Autobiography, 1932
- Unborn Son: political commentary, 1933
- The Coming of Aïssa: being the life of Aïssa ben Yusuf of El Naseerta, otherwise known as Jesus of Nazareth, 1935
- Oasis: political and social comment, 1936

Source: Who Was Who.

== Arms ==
Coat of arms of Oliver Baldwin, 2nd Earl Baldwin of Bewdley
Coronet A Coronet of an Earl Crest A Cockatrice sejant wings addorsed Argent combed wattled and beaked Or gorged with a Crown Vallary lined and reflexed over the back Gold and charged on the shoulder with a Rose Gules barbed and seeded proper Escutcheon Argent on a Saltire Sable a Quatrefoil Or Supporters On either side a White Owl proper, that on the sinister holding in the beak a Sprig of Broom also proper Motto Per Deum Meum Transilio Murum (With the help of my God I leap over the wall)

== Sources ==
- Lyttleton, George; Rupert Hart-Davis (1981). Lyttelton/Hart-Davis Letters, Volume 3. London: John Murray. ISBN 978-0-7195-3770-7.
- Walker, Christopher J (2003). Oliver Baldwin: A Life of Dissent. London: Arcadia. ISBN 978-1-900850-86-5.

Government offices
Preceded by W. R. Macnie (acting)	Governor of the Leeward Islands; 1948–1950	Succeeded by Sir Kenneth Blackburne
Parliament of the United Kingdom
Preceded by Cyril Lloyd	Member of Parliament for Dudley; 1929 – 1931	Succeeded by Dudley Joel
Preceded by Joseph Maclay	Member of Parliament for Paisley; 1945–1947	Succeeded by Douglas Johnston
Peerage of the United Kingdom
Preceded by Stanley Baldwin	Earl Baldwin of Bewdley; 1947–1958; Member of the House of Lords (1947)	Succeeded by Arthur Baldwin
