= Stanley Baldwin =

British statesman (1867–1947)

The Right Honourable The Earl Baldwin of Bewdley KG PC PC (Can) JP FRS
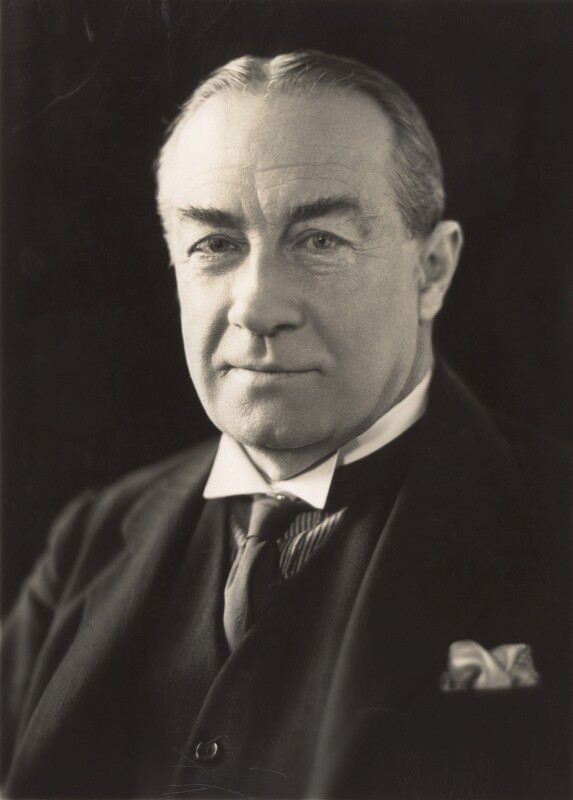
- Baldwin in 1932

Prime Minister of the United Kingdom
- In office 7 June 1935 – 28 May 1937
- Monarchs: George V; Edward VIII; George VI
- Preceded by: Ramsay MacDonald
- Succeeded by: Neville Chamberlain
- In office 4 November 1924 – 4 June 1929
- Monarch: George V
- Preceded by: Ramsay MacDonald
- Succeeded by: Ramsay MacDonald
- In office 22 May 1923 – 22 January 1924
- Monarch: George V
- Preceded by: Bonar Law
- Succeeded by: Ramsay MacDonald
Senior positions
Leader of the Opposition
In office 5 June 1929 – 24 August 1931
Prime Minister	Ramsay MacDonald
Preceded by	Ramsay MacDonald
Succeeded by	Arthur Henderson
In office 22 January 1924 – 4 November 1924
Prime Minister	Ramsay MacDonald
Preceded by	Ramsay MacDonald
Succeeded by	Ramsay MacDonald
Leader of the Conservative Party
In office 22 May 1923 – 28 May 1937
Preceded by	Bonar Law
Succeeded by	Neville Chamberlain
Ministerial offices
Lord President of the Council
In office 24 August 1931 – 7 June 1935
Prime Minister	Ramsay MacDonald
Preceded by	The Lord Parmoor
Succeeded by	Ramsay MacDonald
Chancellor of the Exchequer
In office 27 October 1922 – 27 August 1923
Prime Minister	Bonar Law; Himself
Preceded by	Robert Horne
Succeeded by	Neville Chamberlain
President of the Board of Trade
In office 1 April 1921 – 19 October 1922
Prime Minister	David Lloyd George
Preceded by	Robert Horne
Succeeded by	Philip Lloyd-Greame
Financial Secretary to the Treasury
In office 18 June 1917 – 1 April 1921 Serving with Hardman Lever (1917–1919)
Prime Minister	David Lloyd George
Preceded by	Hardman Lever
Succeeded by	Hilton Young

Member of the House of Lords
- Lord Temporal
- Hereditary peerage 8 July 1937 – 14 December 1947
- Preceded by: Peerage created
- Succeeded by: The 2nd Earl Baldwin of Bewdley

Member of Parliament for Bewdley
- In office 29 February 1908 – 8 June 1937
- Preceded by: Alfred Baldwin
- Succeeded by: Roger Conant

Personal details
- Born: Stanley Baldwin; 3 August 1867 Bewdley, Worcestershire, England
- Died: 14 December 1947 (aged 80) Stourport-on-Severn, Worcestershire, England
- Resting place: Worcester Cathedral
- Party: Conservative
- Spouse: Lucy Ridsdale (m. 1892; died 1945)
- Children: 7, including Oliver and Arthur
- Parents: Alfred Baldwin; Louisa MacDonald
- Education: Trinity College, Cambridge
- Occupation: Business magnate; politician
- Stanley Baldwin's voice Baldwin's last speech as Prime Minister; Recorded 27 May 1937

Stanley Baldwin, 1st Earl Baldwin of Bewdley (3 August 1867 – 14 December 1947), was a British statesman and Conservative politician who was prominent in the political leadership of the United Kingdom between the world wars. He was prime minister on three occasions, from May 1923 to January 1924, from November 1924 to June 1929 and from June 1935 to May 1937.

Born to a prosperous family in Bewdley, Worcestershire, Baldwin was educated at Harrow School and Trinity College, Cambridge. He joined the family iron- and steel-making business and entered the House of Commons in 1908 as the member for Bewdley, succeeding his father Alfred. He was Financial Secretary to the Treasury (1917–1921) and President of the Board of Trade (1921–1922) in the coalition ministry of David Lloyd George and then rose rapidly. In 1922, Baldwin was one of the prime movers in the withdrawal of Conservative support from Lloyd George; he subsequently became Chancellor of the Exchequer in Bonar Law's Conservative ministry. Upon Law's resignation for health reasons in May 1923, Baldwin became prime minister and leader of the Conservative Party. He called an election in December 1923 on the issue of tariffs and lost the Conservatives' parliamentary majority, after which Ramsay MacDonald formed a minority Labour government.

After winning the 1924 general election, Baldwin formed his second government, which saw important tenures of office by Austen Chamberlain (Foreign Secretary), Winston Churchill (at the Exchequer) and Neville Chamberlain (Health). The latter two ministers strengthened Conservative appeal by reforms in areas formerly associated with the Liberal Party. They included industrial conciliation, unemployment insurance, a more extensive old-age pension system, slum clearance, more private housing and expansion of maternal care and childcare. However, continuing sluggish economic growth and declines in mining and heavy industry weakened Baldwin's base of support. His government also saw the General Strike in 1926 and introduced the Trade Disputes and Trade Unions Act 1927 to curb the powers of trade unions.

Baldwin narrowly lost the 1929 general election and his continued leadership of the party was subject to extensive criticism by press barons Lord Rothermere and Lord Beaverbrook. In 1931, with the onset of the Great Depression, Labour Prime Minister Ramsay MacDonald formed a National Government, most of whose ministers were Conservatives, which won an enormous majority at the 1931 general election. As Lord President of the Council and one of four Conservatives among the small ten-member Cabinet, Baldwin took over many of the Prime Minister's duties when MacDonald's health deteriorated. This government saw an Act delivering increased self-government for India, a measure opposed by Churchill and by many rank-and-file Conservatives. The Statute of Westminster 1931 gave Dominion status to Canada, Australia, Newfoundland, New Zealand, and South Africa, while taking the first step towards the Commonwealth of Nations. As party leader, Baldwin made many striking innovations, such as clever use of radio and film, that made him highly visible to the public and strengthened Conservative appeal.

In 1935, Baldwin replaced MacDonald as prime minister and won the 1935 general election with another large majority. During this time, he oversaw the beginning of British rearmament and the abdication of King Edward VIII. Baldwin's third government saw a number of crises in foreign affairs, including the public uproar over the Hoare–Laval Pact, the remilitarisation of the Rhineland, and the outbreak of the Spanish Civil War. Baldwin stepped down on 28 May 1937 and was succeeded by Neville Chamberlain.

Historical retrospection and analysis of Baldwin's political career have been complex. During his tenure, Baldwin was regarded as a popular and successful prime minister, but for the final decade of his life and for many years afterwards he was vilified for having presided over high unemployment in the 1930s and as one of those who appeased Adolf Hitler and – supposedly – failed to rearm sufficiently to prepare for the Second World War. Baldwin has been widely praised for forcing and expediting the abdication of Edward VIII. Today, modern scholars generally rank him in the upper half of British prime ministers.

== Early life: family, education and marriage ==
Stanley Baldwin was born on 3 August 1867 at Lower Park House (Lower Park, Bewdley) in Worcestershire, England. He was the first and only son of Alfred and Louisa (MacDonald) Baldwin. Through his mother, he was a first cousin of, and had a lifelong friendship with, the writer and poet Rudyard Kipling. A summer spent with Kipling and his sister with the freedom of farm and forest at Loughton, Essex, in 1877 was seminal to the development of both boys.

The family was prosperous and owned the eponymous iron- and steel-making business that in later years became part of Richard Thomas and Baldwins. His ancestors had been involved in the iron industry since the days of the Industrial Revolution. On his father's side, Baldwin was English, while on his mother's side he was of Scottish and Welsh descent.

Baldwin was the first in his family to receive an upper-class education. He attended St Michael's School, at the time located in Slough, Buckinghamshire (now Berkshire), followed by Harrow School. He later wrote that "all the king's horses and all the king's men would have failed to have drawn me into the company of schoolmasters, and in relation to them I once had every qualification as a passive resister." Baldwin was academically gifted, winning prizes in history, classics and mathematics. He was a keen squash player and cricketer. While at Harrow, he was punished by the headmaster, Henry Montagu Butler, for writing a piece of schoolboy smut.

Baldwin then went on to the University of Cambridge, where he studied history at Trinity College. His time at university was blighted by the presence of Butler, his former headmaster at Harrow, as Master of Trinity. He was asked to resign from the Magpie & Stump (the Trinity College debating society) for never speaking. After receiving a third-class degree in history, he went into the family business of iron manufacturing. His father sent him to Mason College for one session of technical training in metallurgy as preparation. As a young man he served briefly as a second lieutenant in the Artillery Volunteers at Malvern, and in 1897 became a JP for the county of Worcestershire.

Baldwin married Lucy Ridsdale on 12 September 1892. Following the birth of a stillborn son in January 1894, the couple had six surviving children:

- Lady Diana Lucy Baldwin (8 April 1895 – 21 May 1982)
- Lady Leonora Stanley Baldwin (10 July 1896 – 23 June 1989)
- Lady Pamela Margaret Baldwin (16 September 1897 – 14 August 1976)
- Major Oliver Ridsdale Baldwin, 2nd Earl Baldwin of Bewdley (1 March 1899 – 10 August 1958)
- Lady Esther Louisa (Betty) Baldwin (16 March 1902 – 22 June 1981)
- Arthur Windham Baldwin, 3rd Earl Baldwin of Bewdley (22 March 1904 – 5 July 1976)

Baldwin's youngest daughter, Lady Betty, was severely injured by shrapnel in March 1941 as a result of a bombing raid which destroyed the Café de Paris nightclub she was attending. She required facial reconstruction surgery from the pioneering surgeon Archibald MacIndoe. Baldwin himself was visiting the cafe with her but also survived the bombing.

== Business career ==
Baldwin joined the ironmaster's trade out of duty and in line with family tradition rather than interest. He proved to be an adept businessman, and acquired a reputation as a modernising industrialist. He inherited £200,000, equivalent to £20,801,772 in 2025, and a directorship of the Great Western Railway on the death of his father in 1908.

== Early political career ==
=== Member of Parliament ===
In the 1906 general election he contested Kidderminster but lost amidst the Conservative landslide defeat after the party split on the issue of free trade. In a by-election in 1908 he was elected Member of Parliament (MP) for Bewdley, in which role he succeeded his father, who had died earlier that year. During the First World War he became Parliamentary Private Secretary to the party leader Bonar Law. In 1917 he was appointed to the junior ministerial post of Financial Secretary to the Treasury, where he sought to encourage voluntary donations by the rich to repay the United Kingdom's war debt, writing letters to The Times under the pseudonym 'FST', many of which were published. He relinquished to the Treasury one fifth of his own fortune (its total estimated at own account as £580,000) held in the form of War Loan stock worth £120,000.

=== Treasury and President of the Board of Trade ===
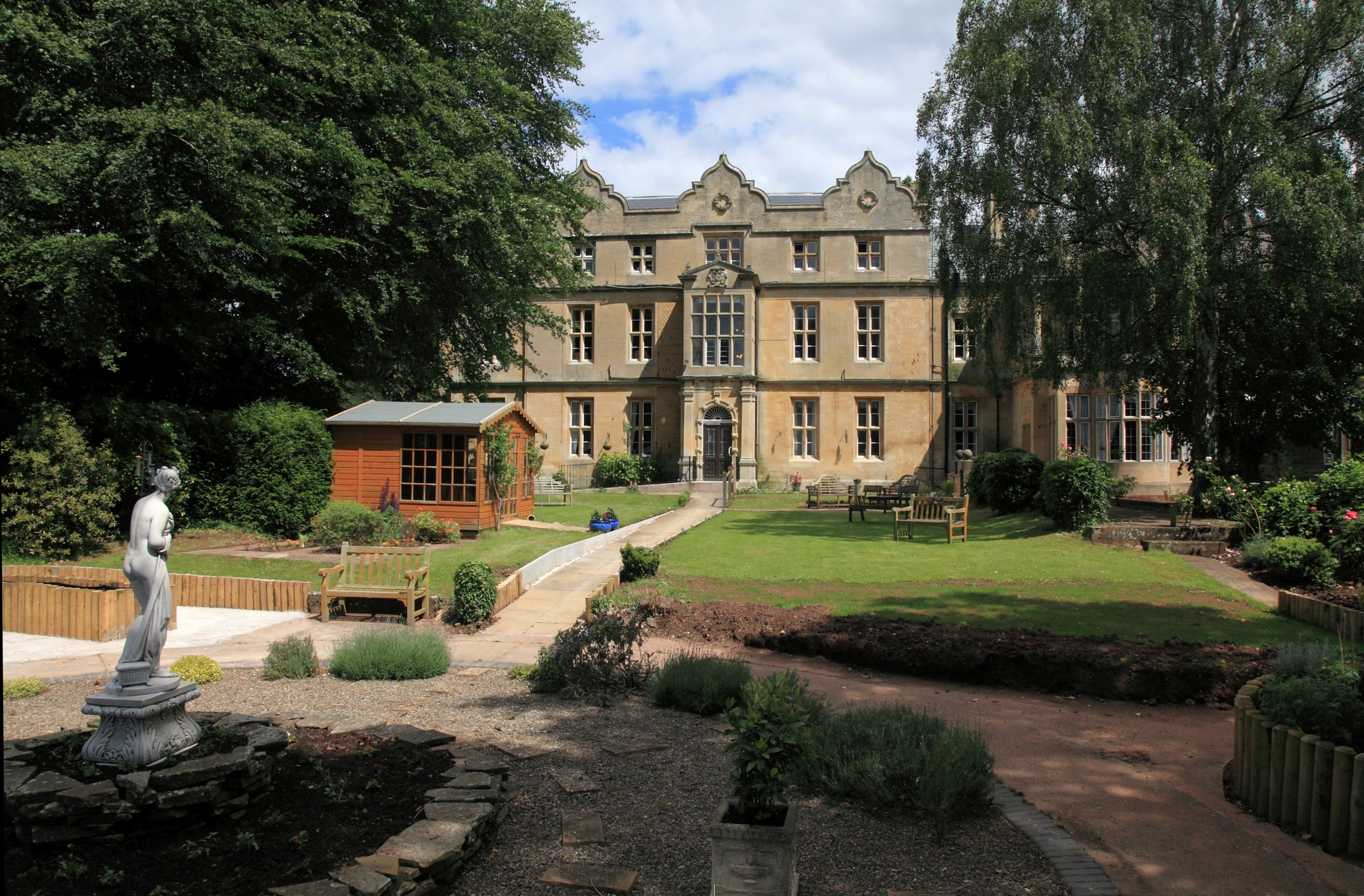
Astley Hall near Stourport On Severn, Baldwin's home between 1902 and 1947

Although he entered politics at a relatively late age, his rise to the top leadership was very rapid. In the Treasury he served jointly with Hardman Lever, who had been appointed in 1916, but after 1919 Baldwin carried out the duties largely alone. He was appointed to the Privy Council in the 1920 Birthday Honours. In 1921 he was promoted to the Cabinet as President of the Board of Trade.

=== Chancellor of the Exchequer ===
In late 1922 dissatisfaction was steadily growing within the Conservative Party over its coalition with the Liberal David Lloyd George. At a meeting of Conservative MPs at the Carlton Club in October, Baldwin announced that he would no longer support the coalition, and famously condemned Lloyd George for being a "dynamic force" that was bringing destruction across politics. The meeting chose to leave the coalition, against the wishes of most of the party leadership. As a direct result Bonar Law was forced to search for new ministers for a Cabinet which he would lead, and so promoted Baldwin to the position of Chancellor of the Exchequer. In the 15 November 1922 general election the Conservatives were returned with a majority in their own right.

== First premiership (1923–1924) ==
=== Appointment ===
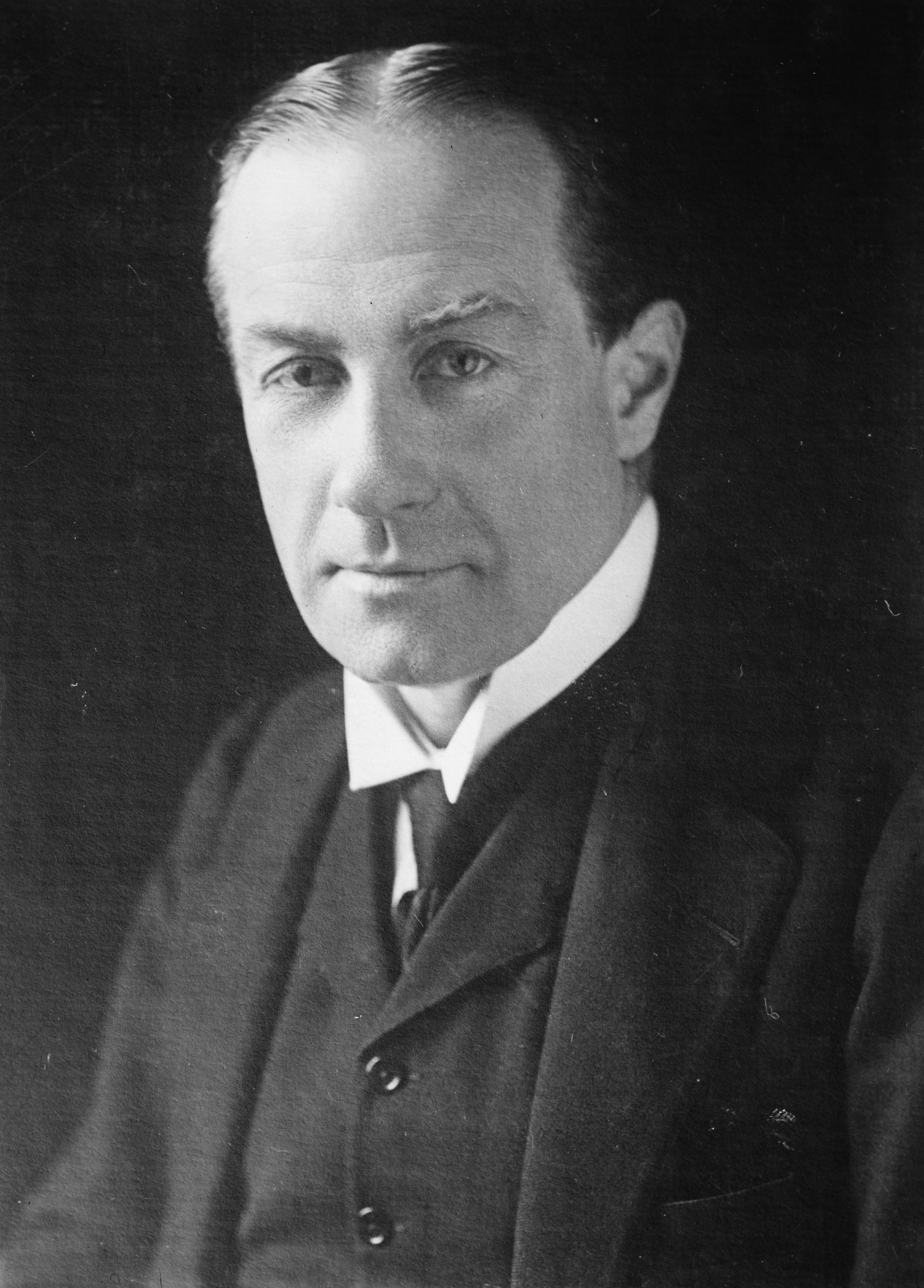
Baldwin, 1920s

In May 1923 Bonar Law was diagnosed with terminal cancer and retired immediately; he died five months later. With many of the party's senior leading figures standing aloof and outside of the government, there were only two candidates to succeed him: Lord Curzon, the foreign secretary, and Baldwin. The choice formally fell to King George V acting on the advice of senior ministers and officials.

It is not entirely clear what factors proved most crucial, but some Conservative politicians felt that Curzon was unsuitable for the role of prime minister because he was a member of the House of Lords. Curzon was intelligent and experienced in international affairs, but his dislike of domestic affairs and his many directorships, at a time when the Conservative Party was seeking to shed its patrician image, were impediments. Much weight at the time was given to the intervention of Arthur Balfour.

The King turned to Baldwin to become prime minister. Initially Baldwin was also Chancellor of the Exchequer whilst he sought to recruit the former Liberal Chancellor Reginald McKenna to join the government. When this failed he appointed Neville Chamberlain to that position.

=== 1923 general election ===
The Conservatives now had a clear majority in the House of Commons and could govern for five years before holding a general election, but Baldwin felt bound by Bonar Law's pledge at the previous election that there would be no introduction of tariffs without a further election. Thus Baldwin turned towards a degree of protectionism which would remain a key party message during his lifetime. With the country facing growing unemployment in the wake of free trade imports driving down prices and profits, Baldwin decided to call an early general election in December 1923 to seek a mandate to introduce protectionist tariffs which, he hoped, would drive down unemployment and spur an economic recovery. He expected to unite his party but he divided it, for protectionism proved a divisive issue. The election was inconclusive: the Conservatives had 258 MPs, Labour 191 and the reunited Liberals 159. Whilst the Conservatives retained a plurality in the House of Commons, they had been clearly defeated on the central issue: tariffs. Baldwin remained prime minister until the opening of the new Parliament in January 1924, when his administration was defeated in a vote on its legislative programme set out in the King's Speech. He offered his resignation to George V immediately.

== Leader of the Opposition (1924) ==
Baldwin successfully held on to the party leadership amid some colleagues' calls for his resignation. For the next ten months, an unstable minority Labour government under Prime Minister Ramsay MacDonald held office. On 13 March 1924, the Labour government was defeated for the first time in the Commons, although the Conservatives decided to vote with Labour later that day against the Liberals.

During a debate on the naval estimates the Conservatives opposed Labour but supported them on 18 March in a vote on cutting expenditure on the Singapore Naval Base. Baldwin also cooperated with MacDonald over Irish policy to stop it becoming a party-political issue.

The Labour government was negotiating with the Soviet government over intended commercial treaties – 'the Russian Treaties' – to provide most favoured nation privileges and diplomatic status for the UK trade delegation; and a treaty that would settle the claims of pre-revolutionary British bondholders and holders of confiscated property, after which the British government would guarantee a loan to the Soviet Union. Baldwin decided to vote against the government over the Russian Treaties, which brought the government down on 8 October.

=== 1924 re-election ===
The general election held in October 1924 brought a landslide majority of 223 for the Conservative party, primarily at the expense of an unpopular Liberal Party. Baldwin campaigned on the "impracticability" of socialism, the Campbell Case, the Zinoviev letter (which Baldwin thought was genuine, and the Conservatives leaked to the Daily Mail at a most damaging time to the Labour campaign; the letter is now widely believed to have been a forgery) and the Russian Treaties. In a speech during the campaign Baldwin said:

It makes my blood boil to read of the way which Mr. Zinoviev is speaking of the Prime Minister today. Though one time there went up a cry, "Hands off Russia", I think it's time somebody said to Russia, "Hands off England".

== Second premiership (1924–1929) ==
=== Cabinet ===
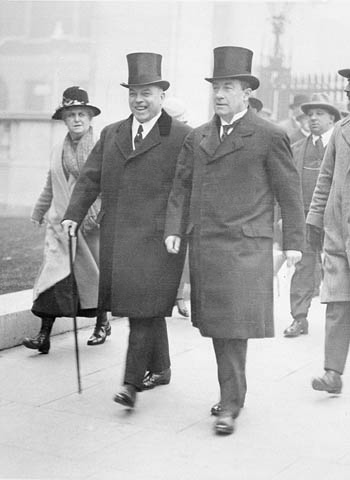
W. L. Mackenzie King, Prime Minister of Canada (left) and Baldwin at the Imperial Conference, October 1926

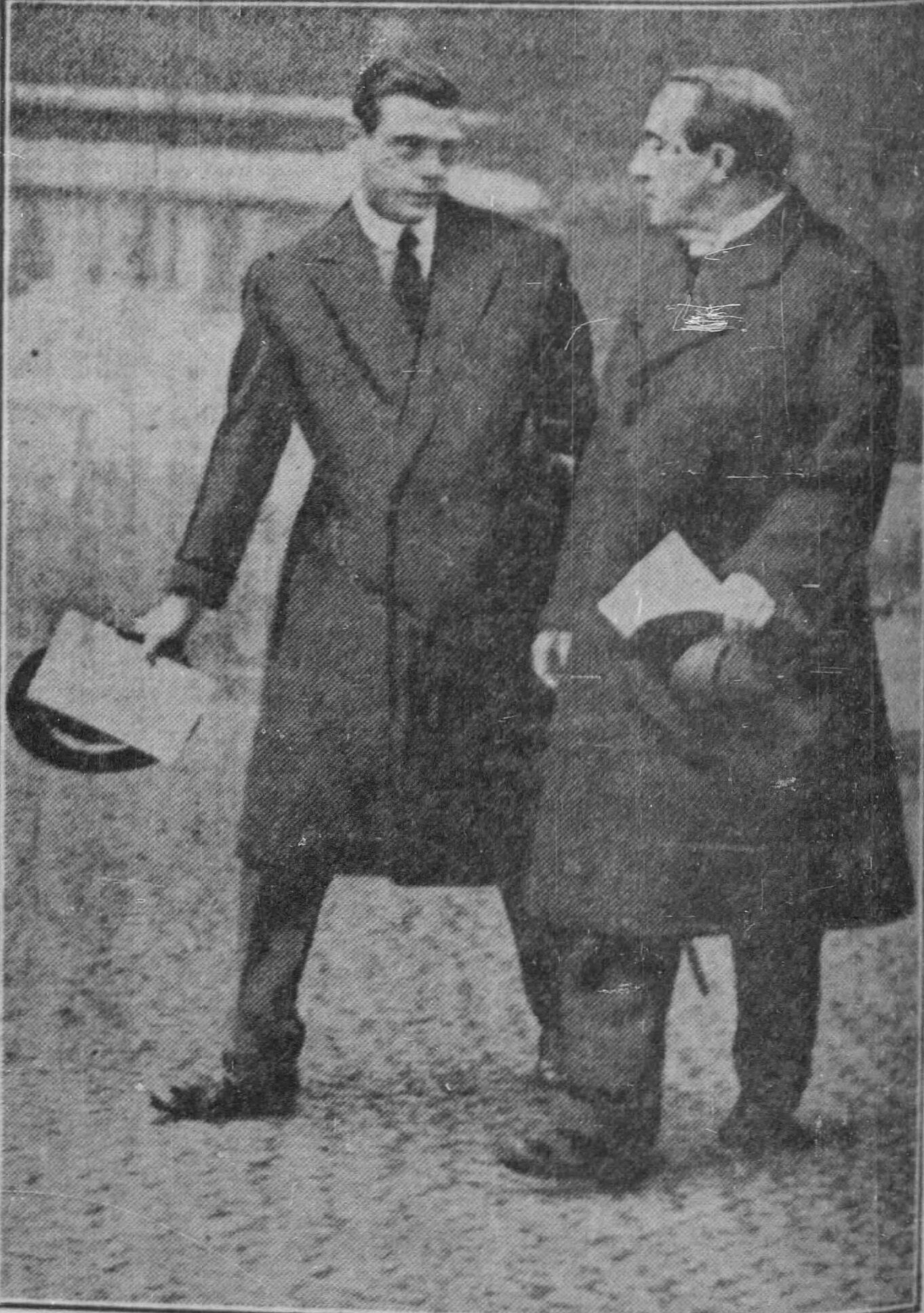
Baldwin (right) talks with Edward, Prince of Wales (the future King Edward VIII) in October 1926

Baldwin's new Cabinet now included many former political associates of Lloyd George: former Coalition Conservatives: Austen Chamberlain (as foreign secretary), Lord Birkenhead (secretary for India) and Arthur Balfour (lord president after 1925), and the former Liberal Winston Churchill as chancellor of the exchequer. Baldwin created the Organisation for the Maintenance of Supplies, a volunteer body of those opposed to the strike which was intended to complete essential work.

In 1927, he was made a Fellow of the Royal Society and a member of the King's Privy Council for Canada.

=== Domestic affairs ===
==== Trade unions strike ====
A defining feature of Baldwin's Second term was the 1926 General Strike, Baldwin handled the strike by using powers awarded to him in the Emergency Powers Act 1920. He deployed the military and volunteers to keep essential services running. The strike ended when it was found to not be protected by the Trade Disputes Act 1906, leading to the strike being called off on 12 May lasting just 9 days. Baldwin's government was widely credited for such an effective response to the strike.

At Baldwin's instigation Lord Weir headed a committee to "review the national problem of electrical energy". It published its report on 14 May 1925 and in it Weir recommended the setting up of a Central Electricity Board, a state monopoly half-financed by the Government and half by local undertakings. Baldwin accepted Weir's recommendations and they became law by the end of 1926.

The Board was a success. By 1939 electrical output was up fourfold and generating costs had fallen. Consumers of electricity rose from three-quarters of a million in 1920 to nine million in 1938, with annual growth of 700,000 to 800,000 a year (the fastest rate of growth in the world).

==== Social reforms ====
One of his legislative reforms was a paradigm shift in his party. This was the Widows', Orphans' and Old Age Contributory Pensions Act 1925 (15 & 16 Geo. 5. c. 70), which provided a pension of 10 shillings a week for widows with extra for children, and 10 shillings a week for insured workers and their wives at 65. This transformed Toryism, away from its historic reliance on community (particularly religious) charities, and towards acceptance of a humanitarian welfare state which would guarantee a minimum living standard for those unable to work or who took out national insurance.

In addition, the Local Government Act 1929 (19 & 20 Geo. 5. c. 17) abolished the workhouse test and replaced the Poor Law with public bodies known as public assistance committees for the relief of the poor and destitute.

Finally, the Representation of the People (Equal Franchise) Act 1928 lowered the minimum voting age for women from 30 to 21, on a par with men.

== Leader of the Opposition (1929–1931) ==
In 1929 Labour returned to office as the largest party in the House of Commons (although without an overall majority) despite obtaining fewer votes than the Conservatives. In opposition, Baldwin was almost ousted as party leader by the press barons Lords Rothermere and Beaverbrook, whom he accused of enjoying "power without responsibility, the prerogative of the harlot throughout the ages".

Ramsden argues that Baldwin made dramatic permanent improvements to the organisation and effectiveness of the Conservative Party. He enlarged the headquarters with professionals, professionalised the party agents, raised ample funds, and was an innovative user of the new mass media of radio and film.

== Lord President of the Council (1931–1935) ==
By 1931, as the economy headed towards crisis, both in Britain and around the world, with the onset of the Great Depression, Baldwin and the Conservatives entered into a coalition with Labour Prime Minister Ramsay MacDonald. This decision led to MacDonald's expulsion from his own party, and Baldwin, as Lord President of the Council, became de facto prime minister, deputising for MacDonald (whose health was steadily deteriorating) until he once again officially became prime minister in 1935.

One central and vitally important agreement was the Statute of Westminster 1931, which conferred full self-government upon the Dominions Canada, South Africa, Australia, the Irish Free State and New Zealand, while preparing the first steps towards the eventual Commonwealth of Nations, and away from the designation British Empire. In 1930, the first British Empire Games sports competition (now the Commonwealth Games) was held successfully among Empire nations in Hamilton, Ontario, Canada.

His government then secured with great difficulty the passage of the landmark Government of India Act 1935, in the teeth of opposition from Winston Churchill, spokesman for the die-hard imperialists who filled the Conservative ranks.

=== Disarmament ===
Baldwin did not advocate total disarmament, but believed that, as Lord Grey of Falloden had stated in 1925, "great armaments lead inevitably to war". However, he came to believe that, as he put it on 10 November 1932: "the time has now come to an end when Great Britain can proceed with unilateral disarmament". On 10 November 1932 he said:

I think it is well also for the man in the street to realise that there is no power on earth that can protect him from being bombed. Whatever people may tell him, the bomber will always get through, The only defence is in offence, which means that you have to kill more women and children more quickly than the enemy if you want to save yourselves...If the conscience of the young men should ever come to feel, with regard to this one instrument [bombing] that it is evil and should go, the thing will be done; but if they do not feel like that – well, as I say, the future is in their hands. But when the next war comes, and European civilisation is wiped out, as it will be, and by no force more than that force, then do not let them lay blame on the old men. Let them remember that they, principally, or they alone, are responsible for the terrors that have fallen upon the earth.

This speech was often used against Baldwin as allegedly demonstrating the futility of rearmament or disarmament, depending on the critic.

With the second part of the Disarmament Conference starting in January 1933, Baldwin attempted to see through his hope of air disarmament. However, he became alarmed at Britain's lack of defence against air raids and German rearmament, saying it "would be a terrible thing, in fact, the beginning of the end". In April 1933 the Cabinet agreed to follow through with the construction of the Singapore military base.

On 15 September 1933, the German delegate at the Disarmament Conference refused to return to the Conference, and Germany left altogether in October. Baldwin, in a speech on 6 October to the Conservative Party Conference in Birmingham, pleaded for a Disarmament Convention, and then said:

when I speak of a Disarmament Convention I do not mean disarmament on the part of this country and not on the part of any other. I mean the limitation of armaments as a real limitation...and if we find ourselves on some lower rating and that some other country has higher figures, that country has to come down and we have to go up until we meet.

Germany left the League of Nations on 14 October. The Cabinet decided on 23 October that Britain should still attempt to cooperate with other states, including Germany, in international disarmament. However between mid-September 1933 and the beginning of 1934 Baldwin's mind changed from hoping for disarmament to favouring rearmament, including parity in aircraft. In late 1933 and early 1934 he rejected an invitation from Hitler to meet him, believing that visits to foreign capitals were the job of Foreign Secretaries. On 8 March 1934, Baldwin defended the creation of four new squadrons for the Royal Air Force against Labour criticisms, and said of international disarmament:

If all our efforts for an agreement fail, and if it is not possible to obtain this equality in such matters as I have indicated, then any Government of this country—a National Government more than any, and this Government—will see to it that in air strength and air power this country shall no longer be in a position inferior to any country within striking distance of our shores.

On 29 March 1934 Germany published its defence estimates, which showed a total increase of one-third and an increase of 250% in its air force.

A series of by-elections in late 1933 and early 1934 with massive swings against government candidates—most famous was Fulham East with a 26.5% swing— convinced Baldwin that the British public was profoundly pacifist. Baldwin also rejected the "belligerent" views of those like Churchill and Robert Vansittart because he believed that the Nazis were rational men who would appreciate the logic of mutual and equal deterrence. He also believed war to be "the most fearful terror and prostitution of man's knowledge that ever was known".

== Third premiership (1935–1937) ==
=== National Government and appointment ===
With MacDonald's health in decline, he and Baldwin changed places in June 1935: Baldwin was now prime minister, MacDonald Lord President of the council. In October that year, Baldwin called a general election. Neville Chamberlain advised Baldwin to make rearmament the leading issue in the election campaign against Labour and said that if a rearmament programme was not announced until after the election, his government would be seen as having deceived the people. However, Baldwin did not make rearmament the central issue in the election. He said that he would support the League of Nations, modernise Britain's defences and remedy deficiencies, but he also said: "I give you my word that there will be no great armaments". The main issues in the election were housing, unemployment and the special areas of economic depression. The election gave 430 seats to National Government supporters (386 of these Conservative) and 154 seats to Labour.

=== Rearmament ===
Baldwin's younger son A. Windham Baldwin, writing in 1955, argued that his father, Stanley, had planned a rearmament programme as early as 1934 but had to do so quietly to avoid antagonising the public, whose pacifism was revealed by the Peace Ballot of 1934–1935 and endorsed by both the Labour and the Liberal oppositions. His thorough presentation of the case for rearmament in 1935, his son argued, defeated pacifism and secured a victory that allowed rearmament to move ahead.

On 31 July 1934, the Cabinet approved a report that called for expansion of the Royal Air Force to the 1923 standard by creating 40 new squadrons over the next five years. On 26 November 1934, six days after receiving the news that the German air force (Luftwaffe) would be as large as the RAF within one year, the Cabinet decided to speed up air rearmament from four years to two. On 28 November 1934, Churchill moved an amendment to the vote of thanks for the King's Speech: "the strength of our national defences, and especially our air defences, is no longer adequate". His motion was known eight days before it was moved, and a special Cabinet meeting decided how to deal with the motion, which dominated two other Cabinet meetings. Churchill said Nazi Germany was rearming and requested that the money spent on air armaments be doubled or tripled to deter an attack and that the Luftwaffe was nearing equality with the RAF. Baldwin responded by denying that the Luftwaffe was approaching equality and said it was "not 50 per cent" of the RAF. He added that by the end of 1935 the RAF would still have "a margin of nearly 50 per cent" in Europe. After Baldwin said that the government would ensure the RAF had parity with the future German air force, Churchill withdrew his amendment. In April 1935, the Air Secretary reported that although Britain's strength in the air would be ahead of Germany's for at least three years, air rearmament needed to be increased; so the Cabinet agreed to the creation of an extra 39 squadrons for home defence by 1937. However, on 8 May 1935, the Cabinet heard that it was estimated that the RAF was inferior to the Luftwaffe by 370 aircraft and that to reach parity, the RAF must have 3,800 aircraft by April 1937, an extra 1,400 above the existing air programme. It was learnt that Nazi Germany was easily able to outbuild that revised programme as well. On 21 May 1935, the Cabinet agreed to expand the home defence force of the RAF to 1,512 aircraft (840 bombers and 420 fighters). (see also German rearmament) On 22 May 1935 Baldwin confessed in the House of Commons, "I was wrong in my estimate of the future. There I was completely wrong."

On 25 February 1936, the Cabinet approved a report calling for expansion of the Royal Navy and the re-equipment of the British Army (though not its expansion), along with the creation of "shadow factories" built by public money and managed by industrial companies. The factories came into operation in 1937. In February 1937, the Chiefs of Staff reported that by May 1937, the Luftwaffe would have 800 bombers, compared to the RAF's 48.

In the debate in the Commons on 12 November 1936, Churchill attacked the government on rearmament as being "decided only to be undecided, resolved to be irresolute, adamant for drift, solid for fluidity, all-powerful to be impotent. So we go on, preparing more months and years – precious, perhaps vital, to the greatness of Britain – for the locusts to eat". Baldwin replied:

I put before the whole House my own views with an appalling frankness. From 1933, I and my friends were all very worried about what was happening in Europe. You will remember at that time the Disarmament Conference was sitting in Geneva. You will remember at that time there was probably a stronger pacifist feeling running through the country than at any time since the War. I am speaking of 1933 and 1934. You will remember the election at Fulham in the autumn of 1933 ... That was the feeling of the country in 1933. My position as a leader of a great party was not altogether a comfortable one. I asked myself what chance was there ... within the next year or two of that feeling being so changed that the country would give a mandate for rearmament? Supposing I had gone to the country and said that Germany was rearming and we must rearm, does anybody think that this pacific democracy would have rallied to that cry at that moment! I cannot think of anything that would have made the loss of the election from my point of view more certain ... We got from the country – with a large majority – a mandate for doing a thing that no one, twelve months before, would have believed possible.

Churchill wrote to a friend: "I have never heard such a squalid confession from a public man as Baldwin offered us yesterday". In 1935 Baldwin wrote to J. C. C. Davidson in a letter now lost that said of Churchill: "If there is going to be a war – and no one can say that there is not – we must keep him fresh to be our war Prime Minister". Thomas Dugdale also claimed Baldwin said to him: "If we do have a war, Winston must be Prime Minister. If he is in [the Cabinet] now we shan't be able to engage in that war as a united nation". The General Secretary of the Trades Union Congress, Walter Citrine, recalled a conversation he had had with Baldwin on 5 April 1943: "Baldwin thought his [Churchill's] political recovery was marvellous. He, personally, had always thought that if war came Winston would be the right man for the job".

The Labour Party strongly opposed the rearmament programme. Clement Attlee said on 21 December 1933: "For our part, we are unalterably opposed to anything in the nature of rearmament". On 8 March 1934, Attlee said, after Baldwin defended the Air Estimates, "we on our side are out for total disarmament". On 30 July 1934, Labour moved a motion of censure against the government because of its planned expansion of the RAF. Attlee spoke for it: "We deny the need for increased air arms ... and we reject the claim of parity altogether". Stafford Cripps also said on that occasion that it was fallacy that Britain could achieve security through increasing air armaments. On 22 May 1935, the day after Hitler had made a Reichstag speech claiming that German rearmament offered no threat to peace, Attlee asserted that Hitler's speech gave "a chance to call a halt in the armaments race". Attlee also denounced the Defence White Paper of 1937: "I do not believe the Government are going to get any safety through these armaments".

=== Abdication of Edward VIII ===
The accession of King Edward VIII, and the ensuing abdication crisis, brought Baldwin's last major test in office. The new monarch was "an ardent exponent of the cause of Anglo-German understanding" and had "strong views on his right to intervene in affairs of state," but the "Government's main fears... were of indiscretion." The King proposed to marry Wallis Simpson, an American woman who was twice divorced. The high-minded Baldwin felt that he could tolerate her as "a respectable whore" as long as she stayed behind the throne but not as "Queen Wally".

Mrs. Simpson was also distrusted by the government for her known pro-German sympathies and was believed to be in "close contact with German monarchist circles".

During October and November 1936, Baldwin joined the royal family in trying to dissuade the King from that marriage, arguing that the idea of having a twice-divorced woman as the Queen would be rejected by the government, by the country and by the Empire and that "the voice of the people must be heard." As the public standing of the King would be gravely compromised, the Prime Minister gave him time to reconsider the notion of this marriage. According to the historian Philip Williamson, "The offence lay in the implications of [the King's] attachment to Mrs. Simpson for the broader public morality and the constitutional integrity which were now perceived—especially by Baldwin—as underpinning the nation's unity and strength."

News of the affair was broken in the newspapers on 2 December. There was some support for the wishes of the King, especially in and around London. The romantic royalists Churchill, Mosley, and the press barons, Lord Beaverbrook of the Daily Express and Lord Rothermere of the Daily Mail, all declared that the king had a right to marry whichever woman he wished. The crisis assumed a political dimension when Beaverbrook and Churchill tried to rally support for the marriage in Parliament. However, the King's party could muster only 40 Members of Parliament in support, and the majority opinion sided with Baldwin and his Conservative government. The Labour leader, Clement Attlee, told Baldwin "that while Labour people had no objection to an American becoming Queen, [he] was certain they would not approve of Mrs. Simpson for that position", especially in the provinces and in the Commonwealth countries. The Archbishop of Canterbury, Cosmo Lang, held that the King, as the head of the Church of England, should not marry a divorcée. The Times argued that the monarchy's prestige would be destroyed if "private inclination were to come into open conflict with public duty and be allowed to prevail".

While some recent critics have complained that "Baldwin refused the reasonable request for time to reflect, preferring to keep the pressure on the King – once again suggesting that his own agenda was to force the crisis to a head" and that he "never mentioned that the alternative [to the marriage] was abdication", the House of Commons immediately and overwhelmingly came out against the marriage. The Labour and Liberal parties, the Trades Union Congress, and the dominions of Australia and Canada, all joined the British cabinet in rejecting the King's compromise, initially supported and perhaps conceived by Churchill, for a morganatic marriage that had originally been made on 16 November. The crisis threatened the unity of the British Empire, since the King's personal relationship with the Dominions was their "only remaining constitutional link".

Baldwin still hoped that the King would choose the throne over Mrs. Simpson. For the King to act against the wishes of the cabinet would have precipitated a constitutional crisis. Baldwin would have had to resign, and no other party leader would have served as the prime minister under the King, with the Labour Party having already indicated that it would not form a ministry to uphold impropriety. Baldwin told the Cabinet, one Labour MP had asked, "Are we going to have a fascist monarchy?" When the Cabinet refused the morganatic marriage, Edward decided to abdicate.

The King's final plea, on 4 December, to broadcast an appeal to the nation was rejected by the Prime Minister as too divisive. Nevertheless, at his final audience with King Edward on 7 December, Baldwin offered to strive all night with the King's conscience, but he found Edward to be determined to go. Baldwin announced the King's abdication in the Commons on 10 December. Harold Nicolson, an MP who witnessed Baldwin's speech, wrote in his diary:

There is no moment when he overstates emotion or indulges in oratory. There is intense silence broken only by the reporters in the gallery scuttling away to telephone the speech.... When it was over... [we] file out broken in body and soul, conscious that we have heard the best speech that we shall ever hear in our lives. There was no question of applause. It was the silence of Gettysburg...No man has ever dominated the House as he dominated it tonight, and he knows it.

After the speech, the House adjourned and as he was leaving, Nicolson bumped into Baldwin, who asked him what he thought of the speech. Nicolson said it was superb to which Baldwin replied: "Yes ... it was a success. I know it. It was almost wholly unprepared. I had a success, my dear Nicolson, at the moment I most needed it. Now is the time to go".

The King abdicated on 11 December and was succeeded by his brother, George VI. Edward VIII was assigned the title of the Duke of Windsor by his brother and then married Mrs. Simpson in France in June 1937 after her divorce from Ernest Simpson had become final.

Baldwin had defused a political crisis by turning it into a constitutional question. His discreet resolution met with general approval and restored his popularity. He was praised on all sides for his tact and patience and was not in the least put out by the protestors' cries of "God save the King—from Baldwin!" "Flog Baldwin! Flog him!! We—want—Edward."

John Charmley argued in his history of the Conservative Party that Baldwin was pushing for more democracy and less of an old aristocratic upper-class tone. Monarchy was to be a national foundation by which the head of the Church, the State, and the Empire would draw upon 1000 years of tradition and could unify the nation. George V was an ideal fit: "an ordinary little man with the philistine tastes of most of his subjects, he could be presented as the archetypical English paterfamilias getting on with his duties without fuss." Charmley finds that George V and Baldwin, "made a formidable conservative team, with their ordinary, honest, English decency proving the first (and most effective) bulwark against revolution". Edward VIII, flaunting his upper-class playboy style, suffered from an unstable neurotic character and needed a strong stabilising partner, a role that Mrs. Simpson was unable to provide. Baldwin's final achievement was to smooth the way for Edward to abdicate in favour of his younger brother, who became George VI. Both father and son demonstrated the value of a democratic king during the severe physical and psychological hardships of the world wars, and the tradition was carried on by Elizabeth II.

== Retirement ==
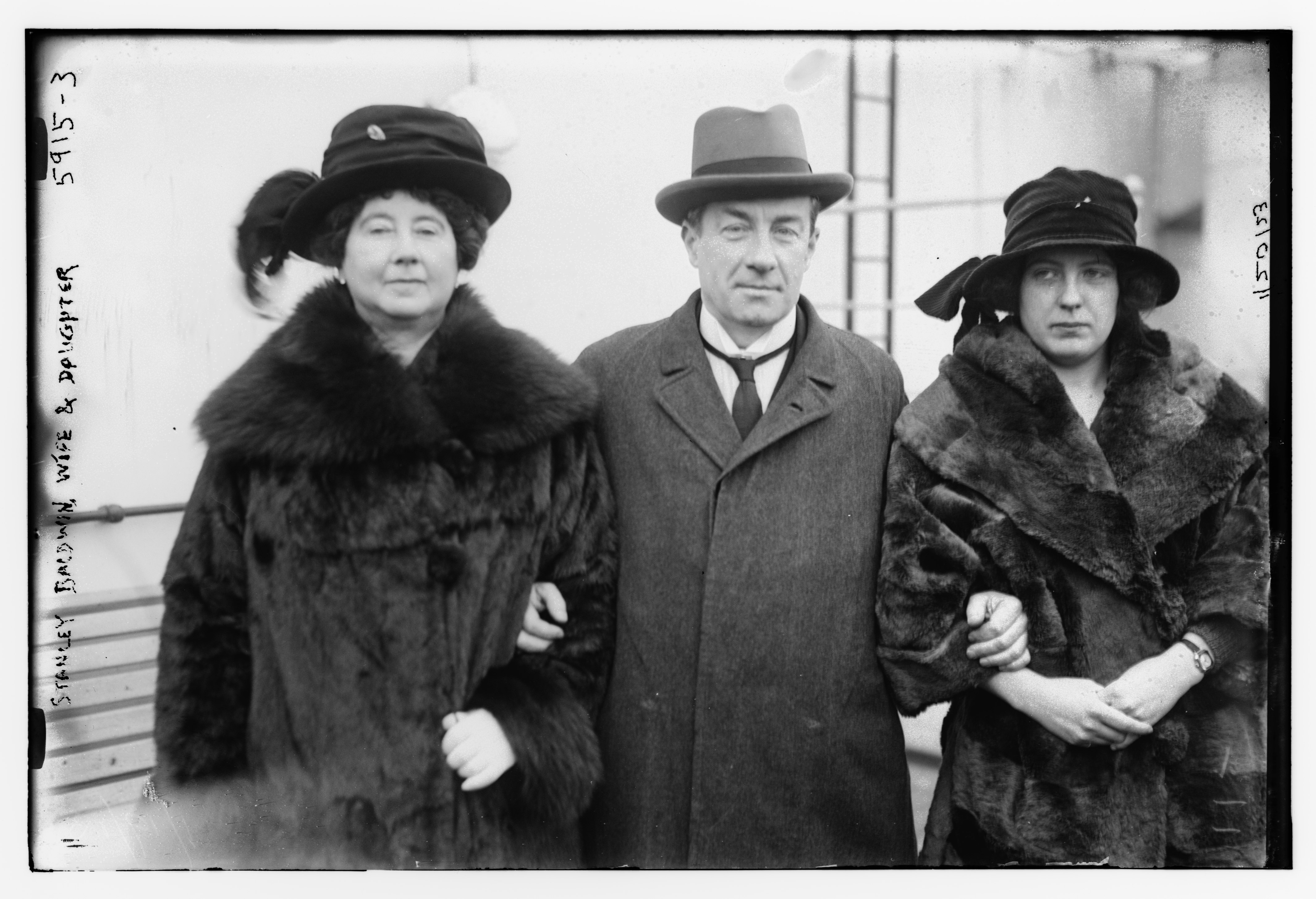
Baldwin photographed by the American press on board a ship, with his wife and daughter

=== Leaving office and peerage ===
Following the coronation of George VI, Baldwin announced on 27 May 1937 that he would resign the premiership the next day. His last act as prime minister was to raise the salaries of MPs from £400 a year to £600 and to give the leader of the Opposition a salary. That was the first rise in MPs' wages since their introduction in 1911, and it particularly benefited Labour MPs. Harold Nicolson wrote in his diary that it "was done with Baldwin's usual consummate taste. No man has ever left in such a blaze of affection". Baldwin was appointed a Knight Companion of the Garter (KG) on 28 May and ennobled as Earl Baldwin of Bewdley and Viscount Corvedale, of Corvedale in the County of Salop on 8 June. In a BBC radio broadcast transmitted on 8 December 1938, Baldwin made a nationwide appeal for funds to help Jewish and other refugees fleeing persecution in Nazi Germany. For this, Baldwin was dubbed a "guttersnipe" by a Berlin newspaper. The "Lord Baldwin Fund for Refugees", helping the kindertransport and other relief schemes, raised over £500,000, equivalent to £36,000,000 in 2022.

=== Attitude to appeasement ===
Baldwin supported the Munich Agreement and said to Chamberlain on 26 September 1938: "If you can secure peace, you may be cursed by a lot of hotheads but my word you will be blessed in Europe and by future generations". Baldwin made a rare speech in the House of Lords on 4 October and said that he could not have gone to Munich but praised Chamberlain's courage. He also said the responsibility of a prime minister was not to commit a country to war until he was sure that it was ready to fight. If there was a 95% chance of war in the future, he would still choose peace. He also said he would put industry on a war footing the next day, as the opposition to such a move had disappeared. Churchill said in a speech: "He says he would mobilise tomorrow. I think it would have been much better if Earl Baldwin had said that two and a half years ago when everyone demanded a Ministry of Supply".

Two weeks after Munich, Baldwin said prophetically in a conversation with Lord Hinchingbrooke: "Can't we turn Hitler East? Napoleon broke himself against the Russians. Hitler might do the same".

Baldwin's years in retirement were quiet. After Chamberlain's death in 1940, Baldwin's perceived part in prewar appeasement made him an unpopular figure during and after World War II. With a succession of British military failures in 1940, Baldwin started to receive critical letters: "insidious to begin with, then increasingly violent and abusive; then the newspapers; finally the polemicists who, with time and wit at their disposal, could debate at leisure how to wound the deepest". He did not have a secretary and so was not shielded from the often-unpleasant letters that were sent to him. After a bitterly critical letter was sent to him by a member of the public, Baldwin wrote: "I can understand his bitterness. He wants a scapegoat and the men provided him with one". His biographers Middlemas and Barnes claim that "the men" almost certainly meant the authors of Guilty Men.

=== Letter to Lord Halifax ===
After Lord Halifax made a speech on the strength of prayer as the instrument that could be invoked by the humblest to use in their country's service, Baldwin wrote to him on 23 July 1940:

With millions of others I had prayed hard at the time of Dunkirk and never did prayer seem to be more speedily answered to the full. And we prayed for France and the next day she surrendered. I thought much, and when I went to bed I lay for a long time vividly awake. And I went over in my mind what had happened, concentrating on the thoughts that you had dwelt on, that prayer to be effective must be in accordance with God's will, and that by far the hardest thing to say from the heart and indeed the last lesson we learn (if we ever do) is to say and mean it, 'Thy will be done.' And I thought what mites we all are and how we can never see God's plan, a plan on such a scale that it must be incomprehensible. And suddenly for what must have been a couple of minutes I seemed to see with extraordinary and vivid clarity and to hear someone speaking to me. The words at the time were clear, but the recollection of them had passed when I seemed to come to, as it were, but the sense remained, and the sense was this. 'You cannot see the plan'; then 'Have you not thought there is a purpose in stripping you one by one of all the human props on which you depend, that you are being left alone in the world? You have now one upon whom to lean and I have chosen you as my instrument to work with my will. Why then are you afraid?' And to prove ourselves worthy of that tremendous task is our job.

=== Iron gates criticism ===
In September 1941, Baldwin's old enemy, Lord Beaverbrook, asked all local authorities to survey their area's iron and steel railings and gates that could be used for the war effort. Owners of such materials could appeal for an exemption on grounds of artistic or historic merit, which would be decided by a panel set up by local authorities. Baldwin applied for exemption for the iron gates of his country home on artistic grounds and his local council sent an architect to assess them. In December, the architect advised for them to be exempt, but in February 1942, the Ministry of Supply overruled that and said all his gates must go except the ones at the main entrance. A newspaper campaign hounded him for not donating the gates to war production. The Daily Mirror columnist Cassandra denounced Baldwin:

Here was the country in deadly peril with half the Empire swinging in the wind like a busted barn door hanging on one hinge. Here was Old England half smothered in a shroud crying for steel to cut her way out, and right in the heart of beautiful Worcestershire was a one-time Prime Minister, refusing to give up the gates of his estate to make guns for our defence – and his. Here was an old stupid politician who had tricked the nation into complacency about rearmament for fear of losing an election.... Here is the very shrine of stupidity.... This National Park of Failure....

There were fears that if the gates were not taken by the proper authorities, "others without authority might". Thus, months before any other collections were made, Baldwin's gates were removed except for those at the main entrance. Two of Beaverbrook's friends after the war claimed that it was Beaverbrook's decision despite Churchill saying, "Lay off Baldwin's gates". At Question Time in the House of Commons, Conservative MP Captain Alan Graham said: "Is the honourable Member aware that it is very necessary to leave Lord Baldwin his gates in order to protect him from the just indignation of the mob?"

=== Comments on politics ===
During the war, Churchill consulted him only once, in February 1943, on the advisability of speaking out strongly against the continued neutrality of Éamon de Valera's Ireland. Baldwin saw the draft of Churchill's speech and advised against it, advice Churchill followed. A few months after this visit to Churchill, Baldwin told Harold Nicolson, "I went out into Downing Street a happy man. Of course it was partly because an old buffer like me enjoys feeling that he is still not quite out of things. But it was also pure patriotic joy that my country at such a time should have found such a leader. The furnace of the war has smelted out all base metals from him." To D. H. Barber, Baldwin wrote of Churchill: "You can take it from me he is a really big man, the War has brought out the best that was in him. His head isn't turned the least little bit by the great position he occupies in the eyes of the world. I pray he is spared to see us through".

In private, Baldwin defended his conduct in the 1930s:

the critics have no historical sense. I have no Cabinet papers by me and do not want to trust my memory. But recall the Fulham election, the peace ballot, Singapore, sanctions, Malta. The English will only learn by example. When I first heard of Hitler, when Ribbentrop came to see me, I thought they were all crazy. I think I brought Ramsay and Simon to meet Ribbentrop. Remember that Ramsay's health was breaking up in the last two years. He had lost his nerve in the House in the last year. I had to take all the important speeches. The moment he went, I prepared for a general election and got a bigger majority for rearmament. No power on earth could have got rearmament without a general election except by a big split. Simon was inefficient. I had to lead the House, keep the machine together with those Labour fellows.

In December 1944, strongly advised by friends, Baldwin decided to respond to criticisms of him through a biographer. He asked G. M. Young, who accepted, and asked Churchill to grant permission to Young to see Cabinet papers. Baldwin wrote:

I am the last person to complain of fair criticism, but when one book after another appears and I am compared, for example, to Laval, my gorge rises; but I am crippled and cannot go and examine the files of the Cabinet Office. Could G. M. Young go on my behalf?

== Last years and death ==
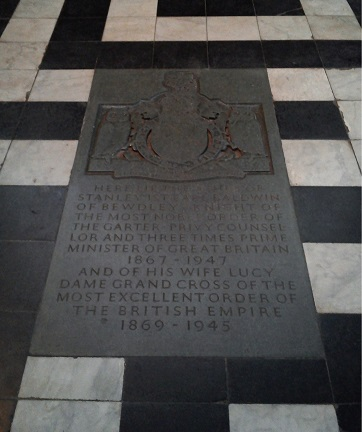
Worcester Cathedral, grave of the 1st Earl Baldwin of Bewdley and his wife Lucy, née Ridsdale

In June 1945, Baldwin's wife, Lucy, died. Baldwin himself now suffered from arthritis and needed a cane to walk. When he made his final public appearance in London in October 1947 at the unveiling of a statue of George V, a crowd of people recognised and cheered him, but he had become deaf and so asked: "Are they booing me?" Having been made Chancellor of the University of Cambridge in 1930, he continued in that capacity until his death in his sleep at Astley Hall, near Stourport-on-Severn, Worcestershire, on 14 December 1947. He was cremated in Birmingham, and his ashes were buried in Worcester Cathedral. No cause of death was announced, but his death certificate states that it was coronary thrombosis.

A memorial service was held at Wilden Church, near Stourport, Worcestershire.

Baldwin was a member of the Oddfellows and Foresters Friendly Society.

== Legacy ==
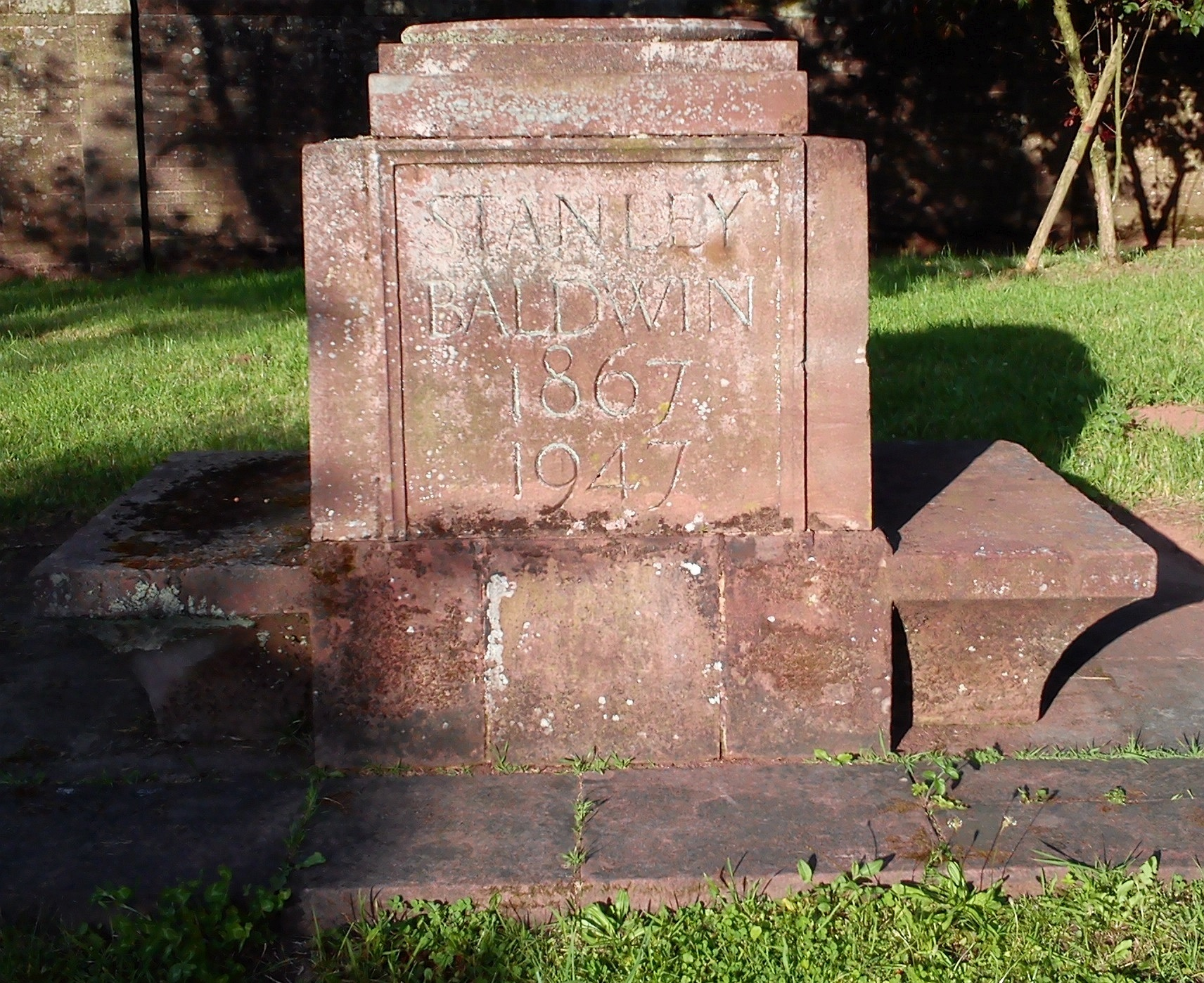
Memorial to the 1st Earl Baldwin of Bewdley near his home, Astley Hall

Upon his retirement in 1937, he had received a great deal of praise, but the onset of World War II would change his public image for the worse. Baldwin, Chamberlain and MacDonald were held responsible for Great Britain's military unpreparedness on the eve of war in 1939. Peter Howard, writing in the Sunday Express (3 September 1939), accused Baldwin of deceiving the country of the dangers that faced it in order not to rearm and so win the 1935 general election. During the ill-fated Battle of France in May 1940, Lloyd George in conversation with Churchill and General Ironside railed against Baldwin and said that "he ought to be hanged".

In July 1940, a bestseller Guilty Men appeared, which blamed Baldwin for failing to rearm enough. In May 1941, Hamilton Fyfe wrote an article ("Leadership and Democracy") for Nineteenth Century and After, which also laid those charges against Baldwin. In 1941, A. L. Rowse criticised Baldwin for lulling the people into a false sense of security and as a practitioner in "the art of taking the people in":

what can this man think in the still watches of the night, when he contemplates the ordeal his country is going through as the result of the years, the locust years, in which he held power?

Churchill firmly believed that Baldwin's conciliatory stance toward Hitler gave the impression that in the case of an attack by the German dictator, Britain would not fight. Churchill was known for his magnanimity toward political rivals such as Chamberlain but had none to spare for Baldwin. "I wish Stanley Baldwin no ill," Churchill said in declining to send him 80th birthday greetings in 1947, "but it would have been much better had he never lived." Churchill also believed that Baldwin, rather than Chamberlain, would be most blamed by subsequent generations for the policies that led to "the most unnecessary war in history". An index entry in the first volume of Churchill's "History of the Second World War" (The Gathering Storm) records Baldwin "admitting to putting party before country" for his alleged admission that he would not have won the 1935 election if he had pursued a more aggressive policy of rearmament. Churchill selectively quoted a speech in the Commons by Baldwin that gave the false impression that Baldwin was speaking of the general election, instead of the Fulham by-election in 1933, and omitted Baldwin's actual comments about the 1935 election: "We got from the country, a mandate for doing a thing [a substantial rearmament programme] that no one, twelve months before, would have believed possible". In his speech on Baldwin's death, Churchill paid him a double-edged yet respectful tribute: "He was the most formidable politician I ever encountered in public life".

In 1948, Reginald Bassett published an essay disputing the claim that Baldwin "confessed" to putting party before country and claimed that Baldwin was referring to 1933 and 1934 when a general election on rearmament would have been lost.

In 1952, G. M. Young published an authorised biography of Baldwin that asserted that Baldwin united the nation and helped moderate the policies of the Labour Party. However, Young accepted the chief criticisms of Baldwin that he failed to rearm early enough and that he put party before country. Young contends that Baldwin should have retired in 1935. Churchill and Beaverbrook deemed several passages in the biography to be defamatory of their own actions and threatened to sue if they were not removed or altered. A settlement was reached to remove the offending sentences, and the publisher Rupert Hart-Davis had the "hideously expensive" job of removing and replacing seven leaves from 7,580 copies.

In response to Young's biography, D. C. Somervell published Stanley Baldwin: An examination of some features of Mr. G. M. Young's biography in 1953 with a foreword by Ernest Brown. This attempted to defend Baldwin against the charges made by Young. Both Young and Somervell were criticised by C. L. Mowat in 1955, who claimed that they both failed to rehabilitate Baldwin's reputation.

In 1956, Baldwin's son A. W. Baldwin published a biography entitled My Father: The True Story. It has been written that his son "evidently could not decide whether he was answering the charge of inanition and deceit which grew out of the war, or the radical 'dissenters' of the early 1930s who thought the Conservatives were warmongers and denounced them for rearming at all".

In an article written to commemorate the centenary of Baldwin's birth, in The Spectator ("Don't Let's Be Beastly to Baldwin", 14 July 1967), Rab Butler defended Baldwin's moderate policies and claimed that it helped heal social divisions. In 1969 the first major biography of Baldwin appeared, of over 1,000 pages, written by Keith Middlemas and John Barnes, both Conservatives who wished to defend Baldwin.

In 1998, historian Andrew Thorpe wrote that apart from the questions of war and peace, Baldwin had a mixed reputation. He was moved by social deprivation but not to the point of legislation and systematically avoided intervention in the economy and social system. He had a ruthless style that included insincerity. His advisors were second rank figures like J.C.C. Davidson and William Bridgeman. Thorpe wrote, "Essentially, Baldwin was a much more neurotic and insecure character than his public persona would have suggested", as shown by his nervous breakdown in 1936 that kept him out of action for three months. On the other hand, Thorpe says that Baldwin was a good co-ordinator of his coalition who did not block colleagues who proposed various small reforms.

Thorpe argued that Baldwin's handling of the 1926 general strike was "firm and uncompromising" but disliked the harsh Trade Disputes Act that followed because it was too far to the right of Baldwin's preferred moderation. Thorpe praised Baldwin's handling of the Abdication Crisis in 1936, which allowed Baldwin to leave office in a blaze of glory. Thorpe said that Baldwin often lacked drive and was too easily depressed, too pessimistic and too neglectful of foreign affairs. On the other hand, he achieved his primary goals of preserving capitalism, maintaining the parliamentary system and strengthening the Conservative Party as a leading opponent of socialism.

In 1999, Philip Williamson published a collection of essays on Baldwin that attempted to explain his beliefs and defended his policies as prime minister. Baldwin's defenders argued that with pacifist appeasement the dominant political view in Britain, France and the United States, he felt he could not start a programme of rearmament without a national consensus on the matter. Williamson argued that Baldwin had helped create "a moral basis for rearmament in the mid 1930s" that contributed greatly to "the national spirit of defiance after Munich".

Williamson admitted that there was a clear postwar consensus that repudiated and denigrated all interwar governments: Baldwin was targeted with the accusation that he had failed to rearm Britain in the 1930s, despite Hitler's threat. Williamson said that the negative reputation was chiefly the product of partisan politics, the bandwagon of praise for Churchill, selective recollections, and the need for scapegoats to blame for Britain's very close call in 1940. Only during the 1960s would political distance and then the opening of government records lead to more balanced historical assessments, but the myth had become so central to larger myths about the 1930s and 1940s that it persists as conventional wisdom about the period.

By 2004, Ball could report, "The pendulum has swung almost completely towards a positive view." Ball noted, "Baldwin is now seen as having done more than most and perhaps as much as was possible in the context, but the fact remains that it was not enough to deter the aggressors or ensure their defeat. Less equivocal was his rediscovery as a moderate and inclusive Conservative for the modern age, part of a 'one nation tradition'."

== Governments as prime minister ==
=== First government, May 1923 – January 1924 ===
- Stanley Baldwin – Prime Minister, Chancellor of the Exchequer and Leader of the House of Commons
- Lord Cave – Lord Chancellor
- Lord Salisbury – Lord President of the Council
- Lord Robert Cecil – Lord Privy Seal (Viscount Cecil of Chelwood from 28 December 1923)
- William Bridgeman – Home Secretary
- Lord Curzon of Kedleston – Secretary of State for Foreign Affairs and Leader of the House of Lords
- The Duke of Devonshire – Secretary of State for the Colonies
- Lord Derby – Secretary of State for War
- Lord Peel – Secretary of State for India
- Samuel Hoare – Secretary of State for Air
- Lord Novar – Secretary for Scotland
- Leo Amery – First Lord of the Admiralty
- Philip Lloyd-Greame – President of the Board of Trade
- Robert Sanders – Minister of Agriculture
- E. F. L. Wood – President of the Board of Education
- Anderson Montague-Barlow – Minister of Labour
- Neville Chamberlain – Minister of Health
- William Joynson-Hicks – Financial Secretary to the Treasury
- Laming Worthington-Evans – Postmaster-General

==== Changes ====
- August 1923 – Neville Chamberlain took over from Baldwin as Chancellor of the Exchequer. William Joynson-Hicks succeeded Chamberlain as Minister of Health. Joynson-Hicks' successor as Financial Secretary to the Treasury was not in the Cabinet.

=== Second cabinet, November 1924 – June 1929 ===
- Stanley Baldwin – Prime Minister and Leader of the House of Commons
- Lord Cave – Lord Chancellor
- Lord Curzon of Kedleston – Lord President of the Council and Leader of the House of Lords
- Lord Salisbury – Lord Privy Seal
- Winston Churchill – Chancellor of the Exchequer
- William Joynson-Hicks – Home Secretary
- Austen Chamberlain – Foreign Secretary and Deputy Leader of the House of Commons
- Leo Amery – Colonial Secretary
- Laming Worthington-Evans – Secretary of State for War
- Lord Birkenhead – Secretary of State for India
- Samuel Hoare – Secretary for Air
- John Gilmour – Secretary for Scotland
- William Bridgeman – First Lord of the Admiralty
- Lord Cecil of Chelwood – Chancellor of the Duchy of Lancaster
- Philip Cunliffe-Lister – President of the Board of Trade
- E. F. L. Wood – Minister of Agriculture
- Lord Eustace Percy – President of the Board of Education
- Lord Peel – First Commissioner of Works
- Arthur Steel-Maitland – Minister of Labour
- Neville Chamberlain – Minister of Health
- Douglas Hogg – Attorney-General

==== Changes ====
- April 1925 – On Curzon's death, Lord Balfour succeeded him as Lord President. Lord Salisbury became the new Leader of the House of Lords, remaining also Lord Privy Seal.
- June 1925 – The post of Secretary of State for Dominion Affairs was created, held by Leo Amery in tandem with Secretary of State for the Colonies.
- November 1925 – Walter Guinness succeeded E. F. L. Wood as Minister of Agriculture.
- July 1926 – The post of Secretary of Scotland was upgraded to Secretary of State for Scotland.
- October 1927 – Lord Cushendun succeeded Lord Cecil of Chelwood as Chancellor of the Duchy of Lancaster
- March 1928 – Lord Hailsham (former Douglas Hogg) succeeded Lord Cave as Lord Chancellor. Hailsham's successor as Attorney-General was not in the Cabinet.
- October 1928 – Lord Peel succeeded Lord Birkenhead as Secretary of State for India. Lord Londonderry succeeded Peel as First Commissioner of Public Works

=== Third cabinet, June 1935 – May 1937 ===
- Stanley Baldwin – Prime Minister and Leader of the House of Commons
- Lord Hailsham – Lord Chancellor
- Ramsay MacDonald – Lord President of the Council
- Lord Londonderry – Lord Privy Seal and Leader of the House of Lords
- Neville Chamberlain – Chancellor of the Exchequer
- John Simon – Home Secretary and Deputy Leader of the House of Commons
- Samuel Hoare – Foreign Secretary
- Malcolm MacDonald – Colonial Secretary
- J. H. Thomas – Dominions Secretary
- Lord Halifax – Secretary for War
- Lord Zetland – Secretary of State for India
- Lord Swinton – Secretary of State for Air
- Godfrey Collins – Secretary of State for Scotland
- Bolton Eyres-Monsell – First Lord of the Admiralty
- Walter Runciman – President of the Board of Trade
- Walter Elliot – Minister of Agriculture
- Oliver Stanley – President of the Board of Education
- Ernest Brown – Minister of Labour
- Kingsley Wood – Minister of Health
- William Ormsby-Gore – First Commissioner of Works
- Anthony Eden – Minister without Portfolio with responsibility for League of Nations Affairs
- Lord Eustace Percy – Minister without Portfolio with responsibility for government policy

==== Changes ====
- November 1935 – Malcolm MacDonald succeeded J. H. Thomas as Dominions Secretary. Thomas succeeded MacDonald as Colonial Secretary. Lord Halifax succeeded Lord Londonderry as Lord Privy Seal and Leader of the House of Lords. Duff Cooper succeeded Halifax as Secretary for War. Philip Cunliffe-Lister became Viscount Swinton and Bolton Eyres-Monsell became Viscount Monsell, both remaining in the Cabinet.
- December 1935 Anthony Eden succeeded Samuel Hoare as Foreign Secretary and was not replaced as Minister without Portfolio.
- March 1936 – Thomas Inskip entered the Cabinet as Minister for the Coordination of Defence. Lord Eustace Percy left the Cabinet.
- May 1936 – William Ormsby-Gore succeeded J. H. Thomas as Colonial Secretary. Lord Stanhope succeeded Ormsby-Gore as First Commissioner of Works.
- June 1936 – Samuel Hoare succeeded Lord Monsell as First Lord of the Admiralty.
- October 1936 – Walter Elliot succeeded Collins as Scottish Secretary. William Morrison succeeded Elliot as Minister of Agriculture. Leslie Hore-Belisha entered the Cabinet as Minister of Transport.

== Bibliography ==
- Baldwin, Stanley. Service of Our Lives: Last Speeches as Prime Minister (London: National Book Association, Hutchinson & Co., 1937). viii, 167 pp. speeches from between 12 December 1935 to 18 May 1937.

== See also ==
- Interwar Britain
- List of covers of Time magazine (1920s)

== Sources ==
- Baldwin, Arthur Windham (1955). My Father: A True Story. George Allen & Unwin Lmtd.
- Hyde, H. Montgomery (1973). Baldwin: The Unexpected Prime Minister. Hart-Davis, MacGibbon. ISBN 978-0246640932.
- Jenkins, Roy (2 March 1987). Baldwin. Harper Collins Publishers Ltd. ISBN 9780002150934.
- Larson, Eugene S. (2023). "Stanley Baldwin". EBSCO. Archived from the original on 16 August 2025.
- Laybourn, Keith (1990). Britain on the Breadline : A Social and Political History of Britain between the Wars. Alan Sutton. ISBN 978-0-86299-490-7.
- Middlemas, Keith; Barnes, John (1969). Baldwin: A Biography. Weidenfeld & Nicolson. ISBN 978-0-297-17859-0.
- Perkins, Anne (2006). "Baldwin". The 20 Prime Ministers of the 20th Century. ISBN 978-1-904950-60-8.
- Taylor, A. J. P. (1970). English history, 1914-1945. Penguin Books. ISBN 978-0-14-021181-8.
- Watts, Duncan (1996). Stanley Baldwin and the Search for Consensus. Hodder & Stoughton. ISBN 978-0340658437.

Political offices
Preceded by Hardman Lever	Financial Secretary to the Treasury; 1917–1921; Served alongside: Hardman Lever	Succeeded by Edward Hilton Young
Preceded by Robert Horne	President of the Board of Trade; 1921–1922	Succeeded by Philip Lloyd-Greame
Preceded by Robert Horne	Chancellor of the Exchequer; 1922–1923	Succeeded by Neville Chamberlain
Preceded by Bonar Law	Prime Minister of the United Kingdom; 22 May 1923 – 22 January 1924	Succeeded by Ramsay MacDonald
Preceded by Bonar Law	Leader of the House of Commons; 1923–1924	Succeeded by Ramsay MacDonald
Preceded by Ramsay MacDonald	Leader of the Opposition; 1924	Succeeded by Ramsay MacDonald
Preceded by Ramsay MacDonald	Prime Minister of the United Kingdom; 4 November 1924 – 4 June 1929	Succeeded by Ramsay MacDonald
Preceded by Ramsay MacDonald	Leader of the House of Commons; 1924–1929	Succeeded by Ramsay MacDonald
Preceded by Ramsay MacDonald	Leader of the Opposition; 1929–1931	Succeeded by Arthur Henderson
Preceded by The Lord Parmoor	Lord President of the Council; 1931–1935	Succeeded by Ramsay MacDonald
Preceded by The Viscount Snowden	Lord Privy Seal; 1932–1934	Succeeded by Anthony Eden
Preceded by Ramsay MacDonald	Prime Minister of the United Kingdom; 7 June 1935 – 28 May 1937	Succeeded by Neville Chamberlain
Preceded by Ramsay MacDonald	Leader of the House of Commons; 1935–1937	Succeeded by Neville Chamberlain
Parliament of the United Kingdom
Preceded by Alfred Baldwin	Member of Parliament for Bewdley; 1908–1937	Succeeded by Roger Conant
Party political offices
Preceded by Bonar Law	Leader of the Conservative Party; 1923–1937	Succeeded by Neville Chamberlain
Academic offices
Preceded by David Lloyd George	Rector of the University of Edinburgh; 1923–1926	Succeeded by John Gilmour
Preceded by Austen Chamberlain	Rector of the University of Glasgow; 1928–1931	Succeeded by Compton Mackenzie
Preceded by The Viscount Haldane	Chancellor of the University of St Andrews; 1929–1947	Succeeded by The Duke of Hamilton
Preceded by The Earl of Balfour	Chancellor of the University of Cambridge; 1930–1947	Succeeded by Jan Smuts
Preceded by The Earl of Balfour	Visitor of Girton College, Cambridge; 1930–1947	Succeeded by Queen Elizabeth the Queen Mother
Peerage of the United Kingdom
New creation	Earl Baldwin of Bewdley; Viscount Corvedale; 1937–1947	Succeeded by Oliver Baldwin
