= European Scrutiny Committee =

UK Parliamentary Select Committee

The European Scrutiny Committee was a select committee of the House of Commons in the Parliament of the United Kingdom. Following Britain's withdrawal from the European Union in January 2020 and the end of the transition period on 31 December 2020 until the 2024 general election, the Committee continued to "monitor the legal and/or political importance of new EU legislation and policy and assess their potential implications for the UK. It was also able to scrutinise the implementation of the Withdrawal Agreement, the Protocol on Northern Ireland and the UK/EU Trade & Cooperation Agreement."

The committee was abolished after the 2024 general election.

== Chairs ==
Committee chairs include those listed below.

| Name | Start | End | Party | Constituency |
|---|---|---|---|---|
| Jimmy Hood | 17 November 1998 | 18 October 2006 | Labour | Clydesdale (1998–2005) |
| Jimmy Hood | 17 November 1998 | 18 October 2006 | Labour | Lanark and Hamilton East (2005–2006) |
| Michael Connarty | 18 October 2006 | 6 May 2010 | Labour | Linlithgow and East Falkirk |
| Bill Cash | 8 September 2010 | 30 May 2024 | Conservative | Stone |

== 2019–2024 Parliament ==
The membership in the 58th parliament was as follows:

| Member | Party | Constituency |
|---|---|---|
| Sir William Cash MP (Chair) | Conservative | Stone |
| Tahir Ali MP | Labour | Birmingham Hall Green |
| John Baron MP | Conservative | Basildon and Billericay |
| Jon Cruddas MP | Labour | Dagenham and Rainham |
| Geraint Davies MP | Labour and Co-op | Swansea West |
| Allan Dorans MP | SNP | Ayr, Carrick and Cumnock |
| Richard Drax MP | Conservative | South Dorset |
| Margaret Ferrier MP | Independent (Note: Suspended from Scottish National Party) | Rutherglen and Hamilton West |
| Marcus Fysh MP | Conservative | Yeovil |
| Dame Margaret Hodge MP | Labour | Barking |
| Adam Holloway MP | Conservative | Gravesham |
| David Jones MP | Conservative | Clwyd West |
| Stephen Kinnock MP | Labour | Aberavon |
| Craig Mackinlay MP | Conservative | South Thanet |
| Gavin Robinson MP | Democratic Unionist | Belfast East |
| Greg Smith MP | Conservative | Buckingham |
| Brendan Clarke-Smith MP | Conservative | Bassetlaw |

=== Changes 2019–present ===
Occasionally, the House of Commons orders changes to be made in terms of membership of select committees, as proposed by the Committee of Selection. Such changes from 2019 onwards are shown below.

| Date | Outgoing Member & Party | Constituency | → | New Member & Party | Constituency | Source |
|---|---|---|---|---|---|---|
| 9 March 2020 | New seat | | → | Margaret Ferrier MP (SNP) | Rutherglen and Hamilton West | Parliament |
| 2 November 2021 | Charlotte Nichols MP (Labour) | Warrington North | → | Dame Margaret Hodge MP (Labour) | Barking | Parliament |
| 27 June 2022 | David Lammy MP (Labour) | Tottenham | → | Geraint Davies MP (Labour and Co-op) | Swansea West | Parliament |
| 4 July 2022 | Andrea Jenkyns MP (Conservative) | Morley and Outwood | → | John Baron MP (Conservative) | Basildon and Billericay | Parliament |
| 4 July 2022 | Marco Longhi MP (Conservative) | Dudley North | → | Adam Holloway MP (Conservative) | Gravesham | Parliament |
| 4 July 2022 | Anne Marie Morris MP (Conservative) | Newton Abbot | → | Gavin Robinson MP (DUP) | Belfast East | Parliament |

== 2017–2019 Parliament ==
Members of the committee were announced on 30 October 2017.

| Member | Party | Constituency |
|---|---|---|
| Sir William Cash MP | Conservative | Stone |
| Douglas Chapman MP | SNP | Dunfermline and West Fife |
| Steve Double MP | Conservative | St Austell and Newquay |
| Richard Drax MP | Conservative | South Dorset |
| Marcus Fysh MP | Conservative | Yeovil |
| Kate Green MP | Labour | Stretford and Urmston |
| Kate Hoey MP | Labour | Vauxhall |
| Kelvin Hopkins MP | Labour | Luton North |
| Darren Jones MP | Labour | Bristol North West |
| David Jones MP | Conservative | Clwyd West |
| Stephen Kinnock MP | Labour | Aberavon |
| Andrew Lewer MP | Conservative | Northampton South |
| Michael Tomlinson MP | Conservative | Mid Dorset and North Poole |
| David Warburton MP | Conservative | Somerton and Frome |
| Dr Philippa Whitford MP | SNP | Central Ayrshire |

=== Changes 2017–2019 ===
| Date | Outgoing Member & Party | Constituency | → | New Member & Party | Constituency | Source |
|---|---|---|---|---|---|---|
| 6 November 2017 | Vacant | | → | Geraint Davies MP (Labour) | Swansea West | Parliament |
| 9 July 2018 | Douglas Chapman MP (Scottish National) | Dunfermline and West Fife | → | Martyn Day MP (Scottish National) | Linlithgow and East Falkirk | Parliament |
| 21 October 2019 | Kate Green MP (Labour) | Stretford and Urmston | → | Vacant | | Parliament |

== 2015–2017 Parliament ==
Members of the committee were announced on 15 July 2015.

| Member | Party | Constituency |
|---|---|---|
| Sir William Cash MP | Conservative | Stone |
| Geraint Davies MP | Labour | Swansea West |
| Richard Drax MP | Conservative | South Dorset |
| Peter Grant MP | SNP | Glenrothes |
| Damian Green MP | Conservative | Ashford |
| Nia Griffith MP | Labour | Llanelli |
| Kate Hoey MP | Labour | Vauxhall |
| Kelvin Hopkins MP | Labour | Luton North |
| Calum Kerr MP | SNP | Berwickshire, Roxburgh and Selkirk |
| Craig Mackinlay MP | Conservative | South Thanet |
| Jacob Rees-Mogg MP | Conservative | North East Somerset |
| Alec Shelbrooke MP | Conservative | Elmet and Rothwell |
| Kelly Tolhurst MP | Conservative | Rochester and Strood |
| Andrew Turner MP | Conservative | Isle of Wight |
| Heather Wheeler MP | Conservative | South Derbyshire |

=== Changes 2015–2017 ===
| Date | Outgoing Member & Party | Constituency | → | New Member & Party | Constituency | Source |
|---|---|---|---|---|---|---|
| 9 November 2015 | Nia Griffith MP (Labour) | Llanelli | → | The Hon. Stephen Kinnock MP (Labour) | Aberavon | Parliament |
| 18 July 2016 | Kelvin Hopkins MP (Labour) | Luton North | → | Kate Green OBE MP (Labour) | Stretford and Urmston | Parliament |
| 7 November 2016 | The Rt Hon Damian Green MP (Conservative) | Ashford | → | Steve Double MP (Conservative) | St Austell and Newquay | Parliament |
| 7 November 2016 | Alec Shelbrooke MP (Conservative) | Elmet and Rothwell | → | Michael Tomlinson MP (Conservative) | Mid Dorset and North Poole | Parliament |
| 7 November 2016 | Kelly Tolhurst MP (Conservative) | Rochester and Strood | → | David Warburton FRSA MP (Conservative) | Somerton and Frome | Parliament |
| 7 November 2016 | Heather Wheeler MP (Conservative) | South Derbyshire | → | Mike Wood MP (Conservative) | Dudley South | Parliament |
| 28 November 2016 | Peter Grant MP (Scottish National) | Glenrothes | → | Alan Brown MP (Scottish National) | Kilmarnock and Loudoun | Parliament |
| 28 November 2016 | Calum Kerr MP (Scottish National) | Berwickshire, Roxburgh and Selkirk | → | Dr Paul Monaghan MP (Scottish National) | Caithness, Sutherland and Easter Ross | Parliament |
| 6 February 2017 | Dr Paul Monaghan MP (Scottish National) | Caithness, Sutherland and Easter Ross | → | Chris Stephens MP (Scottish National) | Glasgow South West | Parliament |

== 2010–2015 Parliament ==
Members of the committee were announced on 26 July 2010.

| Member | Party | Constituency |
|---|---|---|
| Sir William Cash MP | Conservative | Stone |
| James Clappison MP | Conservative | Hertsmere |
| Michael Connarty MP | Labour | Linlithgow and East Falkirk |
| Jim Dobbin MP | Labour Co-Op | Heywood and Middleton |
| Julie Elliott MP | Labour | Sunderland Central |
| Tim Farron MP | Liberal Democrats | Westmorland and Lonsdale |
| Nia Griffith MP | Labour | Llanelli |
| Chris Heaton-Harris MP | Conservative | Daventry |
| Kelvin Hopkins MP | Labour | Luton North |
| Chris Kelly MP | Conservative | Dudley South |
| Tony Lloyd MP | Labour | Stretford |
| Penny Mordaunt MP | Conservative | Portsmouth North |
| Stephen Phillips MP | Conservative | Sleaford and North Hykeham |
| Jacob Rees-Mogg MP | Conservative | North East Somerset |
| Henry Smith MP | Conservative | Crawley |
| Ian Swales MP | Liberal Democrats | Redcar |

=== Changes 2010–2015 ===
| Date | Outgoing Member & Party | Constituency | → | New Member & Party | Constituency | Source |
|---|---|---|---|---|---|---|
| 28 November 2011 | Tony Lloyd MP (Labour) | Manchester Central | → | Sandra Osborne MP (Labour) | Ayr, Carrick and Cumnock | Hansard |
| 4 March 2013 | Sandra Osborne MP (Labour) | Ayr, Carrick and Cumnock | → | Linda Riordan MP (Labour/Co-op) | Halifax | Hansard |
| 17 June 2013 | Jim Dobbin KSG KMCO MP (Labour/Co-op) | Heywood and Middleton | → | Joe Benton MP (Labour) | Bootle | Parliament |
| 5 July 2013 | Joe Benton MP (Labour) | Bootle | → | Geraint Davies MP (Labour/Co-op) | Swansea West | Parliament |
| 15 July 2013 | Penny Mordaunt MP (Conservative) | Portsmouth North | → | Andrew Bingham MP (Conservative) | High Peak | Hansard |
| 25 November 2013 | Tim Farron MP (Liberal Democrats) | Westmorland and Lonsdale | → | Stephen Gilbert MP (Liberal Democrats) | St Austell and Newquay | Parliament |
| 25 November 2013 | Ian Swales MP (Liberal Democrats) | Redcar | → | Mike Thornton MP (Liberal Democrats) | Eastleigh | Parliament |

== See also ==
- Parliamentary committees of the United Kingdom
- European Affairs Committee (French Assembly)
