= Dudley North (constituency) =

UK Parliament constituency (1997–2024)

- Former borough constituency for the House of Commons
- 2010–2024 boundary of Dudley North in the West Midlands

- Location of the West Midlands within England
- County: West Midlands
- Electorate: 61,714 (December 2010)
- Major settlements: Dudley

1997–2024
- Seats: One
- Created from: Dudley East; Dudley West
- Replaced by: Dudley

Dudley North was a United Kingdom House of Commons constituency (Note: A borough constituency (for the purposes of election expenses and type of returning officer)) from 1997 until 2024. (Note: As with all constituencies, the constituency elects one Member of Parliament (MP) by the first past the post system of election at least every five years.)

Campaigns in the seat have resulted in a minimum of 30% of votes at each election consistently for the same two parties' choice for candidate, and the next highest-placed share having fluctuated between 5.5% and 24% of the vote since its creation: for differing parties, the highest placed of these having been the UK Independence Party. The seat attracted seven candidates in 1997 and 2015 and four in 2001.

By the decision of the 2023 Periodic Review of Westminster constituencies, the seat was abolished and replaced by the new Dudley constituency, retaining current boundaries but expanded to include the Dudley Borough ward of Brockmoor and Pensnett from Dudley South.

== Constituency profile ==
Dudley North is one of four constituencies presently covering the Metropolitan Borough of Dudley, encompassing the northern part of the borough, including the town centre. The constituency voted strongly for Brexit and it is slightly poorer than the UK as a whole.

== Boundaries ==
Map of boundaries 2010-2024

1997–2010: The Metropolitan Borough of Dudley wards of Castle and Priory, Coseley East, Coseley West, Gornal, St James's, St Thomas's, and Sedgley.

2010–2024: The Metropolitan Borough of Dudley wards of Castle and Priory, Gornal, St James's, St Thomas's, Sedgley, and Upper Gornal and Woodsetton.

== History ==
Before the 1997 election, Dudley was divided into East and West constituencies, rather than the current North and Dudley South. Dudley North covers much of the area previously covered by Dudley East, which included Netherton but excluded the western part of Sedgley, which was part of Dudley West.

The earlier Dudley constituency, consisting of central Dudley, Netherton, and Stourbridge, was more prominent before 1974. Colonel George Wigg (later Lord Wigg), Prime Minister Harold Wilson's adviser on security matters and later a Minister of State, held the seat for many years until elevated to the peerage in 1968. At the Dudley by-election in March of that year, Donald Williams, the Conservative candidate, gained the seat with a swing of 20%. In 1970, however, the seat was regained by Labour with the election of Dr John Gilbert, who subsequently represented Dudley East from February 1974 until its abolition at the 1997 general election. Gilbert served as a Minister of State under both James Callaghan and (as a peer) Tony Blair. Dudley West meanwhile was represented, until his death in 1994, by Conservative MP Dr John Blackburn. At the subsequent Dudley West by election the seat was a Labour gain with Ian Pearson elected. After boundary changes, Pearson became the MP for the newly created Dudley South seat at the 1997 election

Ross Cranston (Labour) was the first MP for the new Dudley North seat after winning it at the 1997 election; he remained the constituencies MP until the 2005 general election, when it was retained by his successor Ian Austin.

In 2010, Austin held onto his seat with 38.7% of the vote, a narrow 1.7% ahead of Conservative candidate Graeme Brown, at the first general election in 36 years which resulted in a hung parliament. Despite increasing his majority to 11% at the 2015 election (4,181 votes), in 2017 – after two recounts – it was reduced to a mere 22 votes, the fourth smallest majority at that election, and was the Labour seat that was closest to being taken by the Conservatives that election. (Walsall North, a closely neighbouring constituency was indeed gained by the Conservatives.) In 2019, the Conservatives gained the seat for the first time, with their candidate Marco Longhi winning a majority of more than 11,000 votes. The Conservative vote share increased by 16.6% in the seat, which was the party's fifth-largest increase at the election.

== Members of Parliament ==
Election	Member	Party
1997	Ross Cranston	Labour
2005	Ian Austin	Labour
February 2019	Ian Austin	Independent
2019	Marco Longhi	Conservative
2024	Constituency abolished	

== Election results 1997–2024 ==
=== Elections in the 1990s ===
General election 1997: Dudley North
Party	Candidate	Votes	%	±%
Labour	Ross Cranston	24,471	51.2	
Conservative	Charles MacNamara	15,014	31.4	
Liberal Democrats	Gerry Lewis	3,939	8.2	
Socialist Labour	Mark Atherton	2,155	4.5	
Referendum	Stuart Bavester	1,201	2.5	
National Front	George Cartwright	559	1.2	
National Democrats	Simon Darby	469	1.0	
Majority		9,457	19.8	
Turnout		47,808	69.5	
Labour win (new seat)				

=== Elections in the 2000s ===
General election 2001: Dudley North
Party	Candidate	Votes	%	±%
Labour	Ross Cranston	20,095	52.1	▲0.9
Conservative	Andrew Griffiths	13,295	34.5	▲3.1
Liberal Democrats	Richard Burt	3,352	8.7	▲0.5
BNP	Simon Darby	1,822	4.7	New
Majority		6,800	17.6	▼2.2
Turnout		38,564	55.9	▼13.6
Labour hold		Swing	▼1.1	

General election 2005: Dudley North
Party	Candidate	Votes	%	±%
Labour	Ian Austin	18,306	44.2	▼7.9
Conservative	Ian Hillas	12,874	31.1	▼3.4
Liberal Democrats	Gerry Lewis	4,257	10.3	▲1.6
BNP	Simon Darby	4,022	9.7	▲5.0
UKIP	Malcolm Davis	1,949	4.7	New
Majority		5,432	13.1	▼4.5
Turnout		41,408	60.2	▲4.3
Labour hold		Swing	▼2.3	

=== Elections in the 2010s ===
General election 2010: Dudley North
Party	Candidate	Votes	%	±%
Labour	Ian Austin	14,923	38.7	▼3.9
Conservative	Graeme Brown	14,274	37.0	▲5.6
Liberal Democrats	Mike Beckett	4,066	10.5	▲0.2
UKIP	Malcolm Davies	3,267	8.5	▲3.9
BNP	Ken Griffiths	1,899	4.9	▼4.8
National Front	Kevin Inman	173	0.4	New
Majority		649	1.7	▼9.5
Turnout		38,602	63.5	▲2.2
Labour hold		Swing	▼4.7	

General election 2015: Dudley North
Party	Candidate	Votes	%	±%
Labour	Ian Austin	15,885	41.8	▲3.1
Conservative	Les Jones	11,704	30.8	▼6.2
UKIP	Bill Etheridge	9,113	24.0	▲15.5
Green	Will Duckworth	517	1.4	New
Liberal Democrats	Mike Collins	478	1.3	▼9.2
Apni	Rehan Afzal	156	0.4	New
TUSC	David Pitt	139	0.4	New
Majority		4,181	11.0	▲9.3
Turnout		37,992	62.6	▼0.9
Labour hold		Swing	▲4.7	

The original Conservative candidate for the 2015 election Afzal Amin was suspended after allegations he persuaded the English Defence League to announce a march against a mosque in the constituency

General election 2017: Dudley North
Party	Candidate	Votes	%	±%
Labour	Ian Austin	18,090	46.49	▲4.7
Conservative	Les Jones	18,068	46.43	▲15.6
UKIP	Bill Etheridge	2,144	5.5	▼18.5
Liberal Democrats	Ben France	368	0.9	▼0.4
Green	Andrew Nixon	240	0.6	▼0.8
Majority		22	0.06	▼10.9
Turnout		38,910	62.7	▲0.1
Labour hold		Swing	▼5.5	

General election 2019: Dudley North
Party	Candidate	Votes	%	±%
Conservative	Marco Longhi	23,134	63.1	▲16.6
Labour	Melanie Dudley	11,601	31.6	▼14.9
Liberal Democrats	Ian Flynn	1,210	3.3	▲2.4
Green	Mike Harrison	739	2.0	▲1.4
Majority		11,533	31.5	N/A
Turnout		36,684	59.2	▼3.5
Registered electors		61,936		
Conservative gain from Labour		Swing	▲15.8	

== See also ==
- List of parliamentary constituencies in the West Midlands (county)
- List of parliamentary constituencies in Dudley
