= 2018 Walsall Metropolitan Borough Council election =

2018 UK local government election

Walsall Metropolitan Borough Council, 2018
← 2016	3 May 2018	2019 →

21 of 60 seats 31 seats needed for a majority

	First party	Second party	Third party
Party	Conservative	Labour	Liberal Democrats
Last election	25 seats,	28 seats,	2 seats,
Seats won	30	26	2
Seat change	▲5	▼2	Steady
Popular vote	29,237	25,671	2,456
- 2018 local election results in Walsall.
Council control before election
Labour
Council control after election
Conservative

The 2018 Walsall Council election took place on 3 May 2018, to elect members of Walsall Council in England. This was on the same day as other local elections.

== Results summary ==
Walsall Metropolitan Borough Council election result, 2018
Party	Candidates						Votes		
Party	Stood	Elected	Gained	Unseated	Net	% of total	%	No.	Net %
Conservative		30	▲5	Steady	▲5	50.0	48.07	29,237	
Labour		26	Steady	▼2	▼2		42.20	25,671	
Liberal Democrats		2	Steady	Steady	Steady		4.04	2,456	
Independent		2	Steady	Steady	Steady		2.93	1,782	
UKIP		0	Steady	▼3	▼3		2.39	1,452	
Green		0	Steady	Steady	Steady		0.37	227	
Totals		60					29%		

== Ward results ==
=== Aldridge Central and South ===
Aldridge Central and South
Party	Candidate	Votes	%	±%
Conservative	John Murray	2,638	72.8	
Labour	Mish Rahman	683	18.8	
Liberal Democrats	Roy Sheward	303	8.4	
Turnout				
Conservative hold		Swing		

=== Alridge North and Walsall Wood ===
Alridge North and Walsall Wood
Party	Candidate	Votes	%	±%
Conservative	Anthony Harris	1,769	68.7	
Labour	Bob Grainger	806	31.3	
Turnout				
Conservative hold		Swing		

=== Bentley and Darlaston North ===
Bentley and Darlaston North
Party	Candidate	Votes	%	±%
Labour	Rose Burley	1,782	73.2	
Conservative	Colleen Jones	654	26.8	
Turnout				
Labour hold		Swing		

=== Birchills-Leamore ===
Birchills-Leamore
Party	Candidate	Votes	%	±%
Labour	Lee Jeavons	1,296	50.8	
Conservative	Gaz Ali	1,254	49.2	
Turnout				
Labour hold		Swing		

=== Blakenall ===
Blakenall
Party	Candidate	Votes	%	±%
Labour	Ian Robertson	964	47.7	
Independent	Pete Smith	654	32.4	
Conservative	Ross Lee	364	18.0	
Green	Shaun McKenzie	38	1.9	
Turnout				
Labour hold		Swing		

=== Bloxwich East ===
Bloxwich East
Party	Candidate	Votes	%	±%
Conservative	Mark Statham	1,150	50.5	
Labour	Kath Phillips	1,127	49.5	
Turnout				
Conservative gain from Labour		Swing		

=== Bloxwich West ===
Bloxwich West
Party	Candidate	Votes	%	±%
Conservative	Louise Harrison	1,642	60.0	
Labour	Natalie Latham	1,096	40.0	
Turnout				
Conservative hold		Swing		

=== Brownhills ===
Brownhills
Party	Candidate	Votes	%	±%
Conservative	Stephen Craddock	1,414	53.6	
Labour	Patti Lane	958	36.3	
UKIP	Derek Bennett	170	6.4	
Green	Timothy Martin	98	3.7	
Turnout				
Conservative gain from UKIP		Swing		

=== Darlaston South ===
Darlaston South
Party	Candidate	Votes	%	±%
Independent	Paul Bott	999	42.5	
Labour	Deb Madeley	974	41.4	
Conservative	Hilda Derry	321	13.6	
Liberal Democrats	Karen Jukes	59	2.5	
Turnout				
Independent hold		Swing		

=== Paddock ===
Paddock (2)
Party	Candidate	Votes	%	±%
Conservative	Sohal Singh	2,496	57.2	
Conservative	Waheed Rasab	2,299	52.7	
Labour	Haj Bashir	1,463	33.5	
Labour	Andrea Bradley	1,408	32.3	
Liberal Democrats	Jennifer Gray	316	7.2	
UKIP	Peter Faultless	219	5.0	
Turnout				
Conservative hold		Swing		
Conservative hold		Swing		

=== Palfrey ===
Palfrey
Party	Candidate	Votes	%	±%
Labour	Mohammad Nazir	2,675	68.8	
Conservative	Mozamil Khan	1,211	31.2	
Turnout				
Labour hold		Swing		

=== Pelsall ===
Pelsall
Party	Candidate	Votes	%	±%
Conservative	Sally Neville	1,733	63.8	
Labour	Jon Maltman	607	22.4	
UKIP	Graham Eardley	264	9.7	
Liberal Democrats	Steijn Van	111	4.1	
Turnout				
Conservative hold		Swing		

=== Pheasey Park Farm ===
Pheasey Park Farm
Party	Candidate	Votes	%	±%
Conservative	Christopher Towe	1,707	62.2	
Labour	Shamim Ahmed	730	26.6	
UKIP	Steven Grey	177	6.4	
Liberal Democrats	Glyn Fletcher	131	4.8	
Turnout				
Conservative hold		Swing		

=== Pleck ===
Pleck
Party	Candidate	Votes	%	±%
Labour	Harbans Sarohi	2,453	80.1	
Conservative	Jitu Miah	609	19.9	
Turnout				
Labour hold		Swing		

=== Rushall-Shelfield ===
Rushall-Shelfield
Party	Candidate	Votes	%	±%
Conservative	Vera Waters	1,369	53.0	
Labour	Sue Laws	1,030	39.9	
Liberal Democrats	Sam Cooke	92	3.6	
Green	Liam Allen	91	3.5	
Turnout				
Conservative gain from Labour		Swing		

=== Short Heath ===
Short Heath
Party	Candidate	Votes	%	±%
Conservative	Bal Chatta	962	40.3	
Labour	Carl Brown	635	26.6	
Liberal Democrats	Benjamin Hodges	593	24.8	
UKIP	Darren Hazell	198	8.3	
Turnout				
Conservative gain from UKIP		Swing		

=== St Matthews ===
St Matthews
Party	Candidate	Votes	%	±%
Labour	Aftab Nawaz	2,071	51.6	
Conservative	Arfan Matloob	1,415	35.3	
Green	Susan Webster	399	9.9	
Independent	Shaheen Choudhury	129	3.2	
Turnout				
Labour hold		Swing		

=== Streetly ===
Streetly
Party	Candidate	Votes	%	±%
Conservative	Suky Samra	2,184	70.2	
Labour	David Morgan	638	20.5	
Liberal Democrats	Katar Uppal	291	9.3	
Turnout				
Conservative hold		Swing		

=== Willenhall North ===
Willenhall North
Party	Candidate	Votes	%	±%
Conservative	Oliver Butler	1,063	41.7	
Labour	Bob Thomas	694	27.2	
Liberal Democrats	Carol Fletcher	560	22.0	
UKIP	Liz Hazell	233	9.1	
Turnout				
Conservative gain from UKIP		Swing		

=== Willenhall South ===
Willenhall South
Party	Candidate	Votes	%	±%
Labour	Diane Coughlan	1,581	57.4	
Conservative	Nirmal Singh	983	35.7	
UKIP	Bruce Bennett	191	6.9	
Turnout				
Labour hold		Swing		
