= Dudley West =

UK Parliament constituency (1974–1997)

- Former borough constituency for the House of Commons
- County: West Midlands

February 1974–1997
- Seats: One
- Created from: Brierley Hill; Dudley
- Replaced by: Dudley North; Dudley South; Stourbridge

Dudley West was a parliamentary constituency, centred on the town of Dudley in the West Midlands. It existed from 1974 to 1997, returning one Member of Parliament (MP) to the House of Commons of the Parliament of the United Kingdom by the first past the post system.

== History ==
The constituency was created for the February 1974 general election, from the old Dudley constituency (which was created following the Reform Act in 1832) along with the Brierley Hill constituency, and abolished for the 1997 general election. It was a 'bellwether' constituency where the winner of each general election throughout its existence matched the party which won the election.

== Boundaries ==
1974–1983: The County Borough of Dudley wards of Brierley Hill, Brockmoor and Pensnett, Gornal, Kingswinford and Wall Heath, Quarry Bank, Sedgley, and Wordsley.

1983–1997: The Metropolitan Borough of Dudley wards of Amblecote, Brierley Hill, Brockmoor and Pensnett, Gornal, Kingswinford North and Wall Heath, Kingswinford South, Sedgley, and Wordsley.

Dudley West was one of three constituencies covering the Metropolitan Borough of Dudley, encompassing the western half of the town of Dudley. The constituency included Brierley Hill, Kingswinford, and parts of Sedgley. At abolition in 1997, both Dudley West and Dudley East were replaced by two new constituencies: Dudley North and Dudley South, with some constituents being transferred to the re-formed Stourbridge constituency.

== Members of Parliament ==
Election	Member	Party	Notes
Feb 1974	Dr. Colin Phipps	Labour	
1979	Dr. John Blackburn	Conservative	Died in office 12 October 1994
1994 by-election	Dr. Ian Pearson	Labour	Elected on 15 December 1994 by-election
1997	constituency abolished: see Dudley South, Dudley North and Stourbridge		

== Elections ==
=== Elections in the 1970s ===
1970 notional result
Party	Vote	%
Conservative	26,800	51.1
Labour	25,600	48.9
Turnout	52,400	72.0
Electorate	72,778	

General election February 1974: Dudley West
Party	Candidate	Votes	%	±%
Labour	Colin Phipps	29,143	48.9	+0.1
Conservative	Fergus Montgomery	24,474	41.1	–10.1
Independent Liberal	M Thirlby	5,971	10.0	New
Majority		4,669	7.8	N/a
Turnout		59,588	80.3	+8.3
Registered electors		74,219		
Labour gain from Conservative		Swing	+5.1	

General election October 1974: Dudley West
Party	Candidate	Votes	%	±%
Labour	Colin Phipps	28,740	51.1	+2.2
Conservative	LE Smith	20,215	36.0	–5.1
Liberal	A Martin	7,259	12.9	New
Majority		8,525	15.2	+7.3
Turnout		56,214	75.2	–5.1
Registered electors		74,746		
Labour hold		Swing	+3.7	

General election 1979: Dudley West
Party	Candidate	Votes	%	±%
Conservative	John Blackburn	30,158	51.0	+15.0
Labour	MJ Hartley-Brewer	29,019	49.0	–2.1
Majority		1,139	1.9	N/A
Turnout		59,177	76.3	+1.1
Registered electors		77,525		
Conservative gain from Labour		Swing	+8.5	

1979 notional result
Party	Vote	%
Conservative	29,385	51.9
Labour	27,207	48.0
Others	45	0.1
Turnout	56,637	
Electorate		

=== Elections in the 1980s ===
General election 1983: Dudley West
Party	Candidate	Votes	%	±%
Conservative	John Blackburn	27,250	46.2	–5.7
Labour	William Price	18,527	31.4	–16.7
Liberal	Gerald P.T. Lewis	13,251	22.5	New
Majority		8,723	14.8	+10.9
Turnout		59,028	75.9	
Registered electors		77,795		
Conservative hold		Swing	+5.5	

General election 1987: Dudley West
Party	Candidate	Votes	%	±%
Conservative	John Blackburn	32,224	49.8	+3.7
Labour	Gary Titley	21,980	34.0	+2.6
Liberal	Gerald P.T. Lewis	10,477	16.2	–6.3
Majority		10,244	15.8	+3.2
Turnout		64,681	79.1	+1.1
Registered electors		81,789		
Conservative hold		Swing	+0.5	

=== Elections in the 1990s ===
General election 1992: Dudley West
Party	Candidate	Votes	%	±%
Conservative	John Blackburn	34,729	48.8	−1.0
Labour	KJ Lomax	28,940	40.7	+6.7
Liberal Democrats	Gerald P.T. Lewis	7,446	10.5	−5.7
Majority		5,789	8.1	−7.7
Turnout		71,115	82.1	+3.0
Registered electors		86,632		
Conservative hold		Swing	−3.8	

1994 by-election: Dudley West
Party	Candidate	Votes	%	±%
Labour	Ian Pearson	28,400	68.8	+28.1
Conservative	Graham Postles	7,706	18.7	−30.1
Liberal Democrats	Mike Hadley	3,154	7.6	−2.8
UKIP	Malcolm Floyd	590	1.4	New
National Front	Andy Carmichael	561	1.4	New
Liberal	Mike Hyde	548	1.3	New
New Britain	Mike Nattrass	146	0.3	New
FOREST - Freedom of Choice for Smokers	Marjorie Nicholson	77	0.2	New
Natural Law	John Oldbury	70	0.2	N/A
21st Century Conservatives Party	Colin Palmer	55	0.1	New
Majority		20,694	50.1	N/A
Turnout		41,307	47.0	–35.1
Registered electors		87,972		
Labour gain from Conservative		Swing	+29.1	

== See also ==
- List of parliamentary constituencies in Dudley
