= Chris Kelly (British politician) =

British politician (born 1978)

Member of Parliament for Dudley South
- In office 6 May 2010 – 30 March 2015
- Preceded by: Ian Pearson
- Succeeded by: Mike Wood

Personal details
- Born: Christopher Dimitri Kelly; June 1978 (age 48) Wolverhampton, West Midlands, England
- Party: Conservative
- Education: Oxford Brookes University, Imperial College Business School

Christopher Dimitri Kelly (born 1978) is a British Conservative Party politician. He was elected as the Member of Parliament (MP) for the Dudley South constituency in England's West Midlands at the 2010 general election. Kelly stood down at the 2015 general election after having served a single term.

== Education ==
Kelly was born in 1978 and educated at Wolverhampton Grammar School in the Black Country, West Midlands 1989–96, followed by Oxford Brookes University, where he was a History and Politics student 1996–1999, and Imperial College Business School in 2002/3 where he gained an MBA.

Kelly and his friend Justin Tomlinson placed a bet while at university that either would be Prime Minister of the United Kingdom before the year 2038, at the odds of 10,000 to 1. They stand to win £500,000 should this happen. Tomlinson and Kelly were both subsequently elected as members of parliament for the Conservative Party.

== Career ==
After business school, Kelly worked as research assistant for Michael Howard in 2004/5 whilst the latter served as Leader of the Conservative Party.

Kelly was employed by his family's business, Keltruck Ltd – a Scania truck dealership based in West Bromwich – serving as marketing director from 2006 to 2010, and was subsequently a paid non-executive director of his father's company.

Kelly was selected as the Conservative candidate for Dudley South in September 2007. He was elected to Parliament at the 2010 general election in the constituency represented for the previous 16 years by Labour's Ian Pearson.

In Parliament he was a member of the European Scrutiny Committee, and founder chairman of both the All-Party Parliamentary Group for Family Business and the All-Party Parliamentary Group on Combating Metal Theft.

In 2010 Kelly attracted criticism for emailing all his fellow Conservative MPs from his Parliamentary email account urging them to give his sister a secretarial or managerial job.

In August 2014 Kelly announced his intention to stand down at the 2015 general election. Kelly said that he would "...like to thank all those who have supported me since I was selected for Dudley South in September 2007...I would especially like to thank all those who voted for me at the general election in May 2010 and all of the friends and supporters who helped me for that election, as well as those who have supported my efforts since."

The Dudley South seat was subsequently retained by the Conservatives, with Mike Wood succeeding Kelly as the area's elected representative at the 2015 election.

Parliament of the United Kingdom
Preceded by Ian Pearson	Member of Parliament for Dudley South; 2010–2015	Succeeded by Mike Wood
