= Ian Austin =

British politician (born 1965)

The Right Honourable The Lord Austin of Dudley
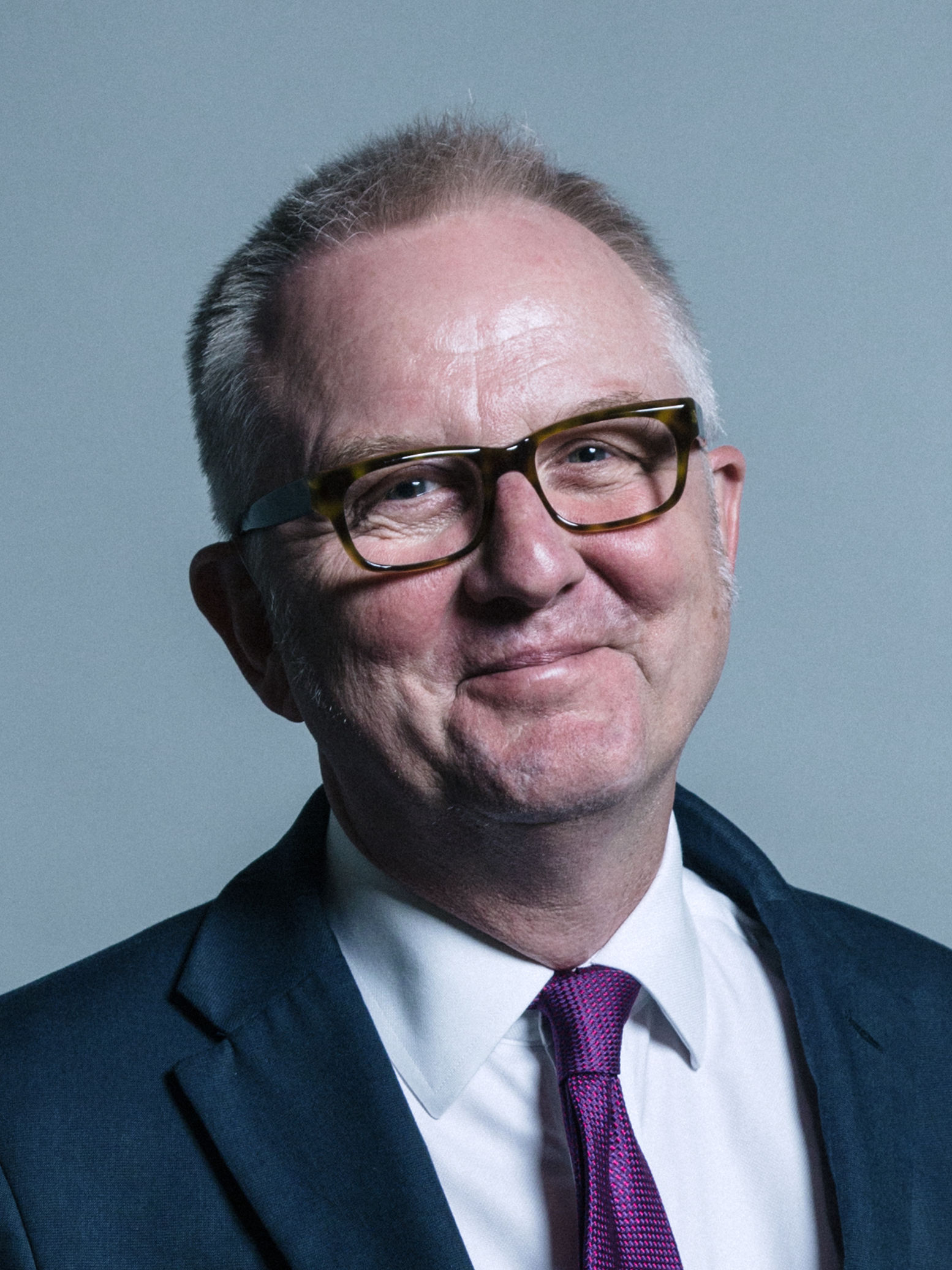
- Official portrait, 2017

Parliamentary Under-Secretary of State for Communities and Local Government
- In office 9 June 2009 – 11 May 2010
- Prime Minister: Gordon Brown
- Preceded by: Iain Wright
- Succeeded by: Bob Neill

Minister for the West Midlands
- In office 6 October 2008 – 11 May 2010
- Prime Minister: Gordon Brown
- Preceded by: Liam Byrne
- Succeeded by: Position abolished

Assistant Government Whip
- In office 5 October 2008 – 9 June 2009
- Prime Minister: Gordon Brown
- Chief Whip: Nick Brown

Parliamentary Private Secretary to the Prime Minister
- In office 27 June 2007 – 4 October 2008 Serving with Angela Smith
- Prime Minister: Gordon Brown
- Preceded by: Keith Hill
- Succeeded by: Jon Trickett

Member of the House of Lords
- Lord Temporal
- Life peerage 2 September 2020

Member of Parliament for Dudley North
- In office 5 May 2005 – 6 November 2019
- Preceded by: Ross Cranston
- Succeeded by: Marco Longhi

Personal details
- Born: Ian Christopher Austin; 6 March 1965 (age 61) Bury St Edmunds, Suffolk, England
- Party: Non-affiliated (since 2019)
- Other political affiliations: Labour (1983–2019)
- Education: University of Essex
- Website: parliament..ian-austin

Ian Christopher Austin, Baron Austin of Dudley (born 6 March 1965) is a British politician who sits as a life peer in the House of Lords. He was the Member of Parliament (MP) for Dudley North from the 2005 general election until the 2019 general election when he stood down. Formerly a member of the Labour Party, he resigned from the party on 22 February 2019 to sit as an independent, and was ennobled in the 2019 Dissolution Honours. He served as Parliamentary Under-Secretary of State at the Department for Communities and Local Government from 2009 to 2010.

== Early life ==
Austin was born on 6 March 1965 and was adopted as a baby by Dudley school teachers Fred and Margaret Austin. His adoptive father, Fred (a Czech Jew who was himself adopted by an English family on the Nazi invasion of Czechoslovakia), was head of The Dudley School from its formation in 1975 until his retirement in 1985. Fred Austin, born Fredi Stiller, was awarded the MBE in the New Year's Honours List for 2006 in recognition of his service to the communities of Dudley. Fred Austin died in March 2019 at the age of 90, four months after the death of his wife Margaret. Ian Austin's adoptive siblings are David Austin, the chief executive of the British Board of Film Classification, Helen, who is a nutritionist and former teacher, and Rebecca, who is one of Britain's leading midwives.

Having failed the eleven-plus to attend King Edward's School, Birmingham, Austin was educated at The Dudley School from 1977 to 1983. He studied government and politics at the University of Essex.

== Journalism career ==
Austin was keen to obtain a National Union of Journalists card and took a job with Black Country Publishing in Netherton where his personal interest in sport, especially cycling (he was chair of the All-Party Parliamentary Cycling Group) and football, led him to work as a journalist on Midland Sport Magazine.

== Political career ==
=== Dudley Metropolitan Borough Council ===
Austin was elected as a councillor in the Metropolitan Borough of Dudley in 1991, and served until 1995.

=== West Midlands Labour Party ===
In 1995 Austin then moved to become press officer for the West Midlands Labour Party until 1998.

=== Scottish Labour Party ===
In 1998, Austin spent a year as deputy director of communications for the Scottish Labour Party.

=== Office of the Chancellor of the Exchequer ===
Austin was appointed a political advisor to the Chancellor of the Exchequer (later Prime Minister), Gordon Brown, in 1999. He held the position until his election in 2005, and was known as one of Brown's closest lieutenants.

=== House of Commons ===
Austin was selected as the Labour candidate for Dudley North following the retirement of Ross Cranston, and was elected at the 2005 general election with a majority of 5,432.

In June 2007, Austin was appointed Parliamentary Private Secretary to the Prime Minister to Gordon Brown, with a special provision to attend cabinet meetings. He was moved to a new position in the 2008 reshuffle, becoming an Assistant Whip for the Government. In the June 2009 reshuffle, he became Parliamentary Under Secretary of State at the Department for Communities and Local Government and Minister for the West Midlands. Under Ed Miliband, Austin served as Shadow Minister for Culture, Media and Sport between 2010 and 2011 and Shadow Minister for Work and Pensions between 2011 and 2013.

In the 2015 Parliament, Austin joined the Education Select Committee, and was appointed as chair of the Labour Party's education committee.

==== Behaviour ====
Austin was reprimanded by the Speaker of the House of Commons for heckling during Prime Minister's Questions on 18 October 2006, and he was subsequently described by David Cameron as one of Gordon Brown's "boot boys". The following week he was rebuked again by the Speaker for comments made towards the Conservative benches.

On 1 June 2012, Austin apologised after falsely claiming a Palestinian human rights group, Friends of Al-Aqsa, had denied the Holocaust happened in an article he wrote on the Labour Uncut website in 2011. He accepted the material of which he complained had been produced by an unconnected individual.

In June 2014, Deputy Speaker Dawn Primarolo told Austin to apologise after he referred to Conservative MP Tobias Ellwood as an "idiot".

In July 2016, Austin was reprimanded by the Speaker of the House of Commons for heckling Labour leader Jeremy Corbyn by shouting "sit down and shut up" and "you're a disgrace", as Corbyn criticised the 2003 invasion of Iraq in his response to the publication of the Chilcot Inquiry.

In July 2018, Austin was put under investigation by the Labour Party for allegedly using abusive language towards the Party Chairman, Ian Lavery. General Secretary Jennie Formby dropped the inquiry in November, although Austin did receive a reprimand from the Chief Whip.

On 17 March 2022, Austin and The Daily Telegraph apologised to former Jeremy Corbyn staffer, Laura Murray, and agreed to pay her "substantial damages" (£40,000) for suggesting she was an "anti-Jewish racist" and part of the "vile anti-Semitism of Corbyn's Labour". They accepted there was no basis to the claims and that Ms Murray had in fact "devoted significant time and energy to confronting and challenging antisemitism within the Labour Party".

==== Expenses ====
In May 2009, The Daily Telegraph reported that Austin had attempted to split a claim for stamp duty on buying his second home in London into two payments and tried to claim the cost back over two financial years. This allowed him to claim the majority of the money (£21,559, just £75 short of the maximum) under his second-home allowance in the 2005/06 financial year. He then claimed for the remaining £1,344 stamp duty cost in 2006–2007, together with his legal fees. In all, he went on to claim £22,076 (£34 short of the maximum) in the next financial year.

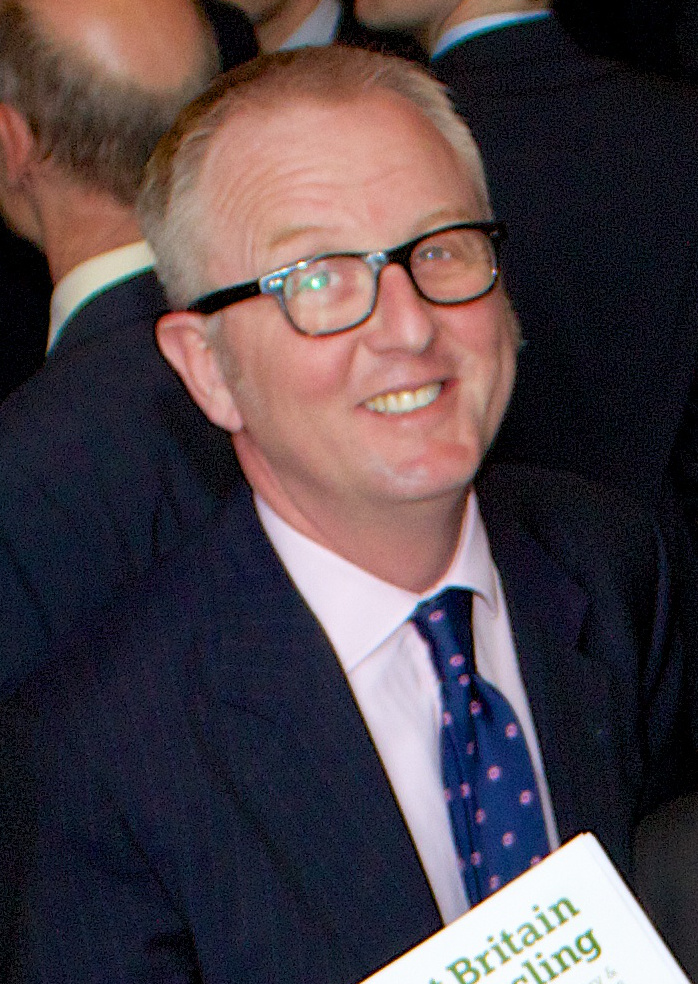
Austin in 2013

It also reported that Austin "flipped" his second-home designation weeks before buying a £270,000 London flat, and had claimed £467 for a stereo system for his constituency home, shortly before he changed his second-home designation to London. He then spent a further £2,800 furnishing the new London flat.

Austin denied any wrongdoing, and defended his actions in an interview with local newspaper Dudley News.

==== Resignation from the Labour Party ====
On 22 February 2019, Austin resigned from the Labour Party over what he said was its 'culture of extremism, anti-Semitism and intolerance' and became an independent MP. His resignation was in the same week as The Independent Group had been formed, but Austin did not join, as he disagreed with their desire for another referendum on Brexit.

On 19 March, MPs passed a motion put forward by Labour to remove Austin, as well as Independent Group MP Mike Gapes, from their seats on the Foreign Affairs Select Committee, which they occupied as part of the Labour Party's allocation. Austin said Jeremy Corbyn wanted "to boot me off this committee because I stood up against racism", while Labour said it was right the party filled its allocation of seats on the committees.

In July 2019, Austin was appointed Prime Ministerial Trade Envoy to Israel by Theresa May. It was an unpaid and voluntary cross-party network, supporting UK trade and investment in global markets.

In September 2019, Austin used his speech in the emergency debate relating to a No-deal Brexit proposed by Jeremy Corbyn to criticise him. Labour MP Liz McInnes, who was sitting on a backbench behind him, told him to "go sit somewhere else" in anger at his comments. Later in the month he attended the Labour Party conference with a large mobile billboard stating Corbyn was unfit to lead the party or country.

Later that month, outside the Labour Party conference Austin launched the pressure group Mainstream UK, in front of a banner reading "Jeremy Corbyn: Unfit to Lead the Labour Party, Unfit to Lead the Country". The group described itself as "a new campaign designed to encourage a return to respectable and responsible politics, and to banish extremism from British politics once and for all". During the 2019 general election, Mainstream purchased targeted advertisements attacking Labour's taxation, spending, and nationalisation policies.

In November 2019, Austin announced he would not stand in the December general election, and advised his constituents to vote for the Conservative Party in order to stop Jeremy Corbyn becoming prime minister. In December 2019, ten days before the general election, Labour supporters and members received a promotion on behalf of the Conservative and Unionist Party through the Royal Mail which was a letter from their formerly Labour MP. In the letter, Austin urged Labour voters to vote Conservative. The letter claimed the addresses had been obtained from the Register of Electors.

Austin's successor, Conservative Marco Longhi, won the seat with a majority of 11,533, defeating the Labour candidate Melanie Dudley. This marked the first time a Labour candidate had lost an election in Dudley North since the seat's creation in 1997.

=== House of Lords ===
Austin was nominated for a life peerage in Boris Johnson's Dissolution Honours list in 2020, along with other prominent Corbyn critics Frank Field and John Woodcock, as well as Labour Leave-associated figures Kate Hoey and Gisela Stuart. He was created Baron Austin of Dudley, of Dudley in the County of West Midlands in the afternoon of 2 September 2020 and now sits as a non-affiliated life peer.

== Political positions ==
In the Labour leadership election of 2010, Austin nominated Ed Balls, who came third.

In 2013, Austin proposed the government share costs with parents in areas of poor educational attainment who wished to send their children to private schools.

In October 2014, and again in December 2016, Austin called for greater action to limit immigration, and proposed a range of measures to achieve this, including tighter border controls, fingerprinting immigrants, deporting foreign criminals, reducing benefits entitlement, charging foreigners for NHS care, allowing only those who have lived or worked locally for two years on the housing list and measures to discourage the employment of immigrants rather than British citizens.

In March 2018, Austin described Russia as "a fascist, homophobic dictatorship" and suggested the England team boycott the 2018 FIFA World Cup.

Austin was a member of Labour Friends of Israel. Jonathan Goldstein of the Jewish Leadership Council has called him a friend and ally.

=== Brexit ===
In 2013, Austin became one of the first Labour MPs to call for an in/out referendum on the UK's membership of the EU. He supported the UK remaining in the EU in the 2016 membership referendum, but was opposed to a second referendum. On 15 January 2019, Austin was one of only three Labour MPs to vote for Theresa May's Brexit deal in the Meaningful vote (along with Kevin Barron and John Mann). In the same series of votes, Austin was one of 14 Labour MPs who voted against his colleague Yvette Cooper's amendment, which was designed to prevent a no-deal Brexit by extending the article 50 negotiating period.

=== Midland Heart suspension ===
In February 2024, Austin was suspended as chairman by Midland Heart, a social landlord, for a tweet in which he said "Everyone, better safe than sorry: before you go to bed, nip down and check you haven’t inadvertently got a death cult of Islamist murderers and rapists running their operations downstairs. It’s easily done.". Lord Austin said that the tweet (which was later deleted) referred to Hamas.

Parliament of the United Kingdom
Preceded by Ross Cranston	Member of Parliament for Dudley North; 2005–2019	Succeeded by Marco Longhi
Orders of precedence in the United Kingdom
Preceded by The Lord Wharton of Yarm	Gentlemen; Baron Austin of Dudley	Followed by The Lord Walney
