= List of parliamentary constituencies in Dudley =

The town of Dudley, in the West Midlands of England, has been represented in the House of Commons of the Parliament of the United Kingdom through several parliamentary constituencies:

	1832–1974	1974–1997	1997–present
Dudley	1832–Feb 1974		
Dudley East		Feb 1974–1997	
Dudley West		Feb 1974–1997	
Dudley North			1997–present
Dudley South			1997–present

== See also ==
- List of parliamentary constituencies in the West Midlands (county)
