= Ross Cranston =

British politician (born 1948)

Sir Ross Cranston KC
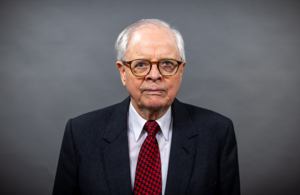

Justice of the High Court
- In office 2007–2017

Solicitor General for England and Wales
- In office 28 July 1998 – 11 June 2001
- Prime Minister: Tony Blair
- Preceded by: The Lord Falconer of Thoroton
- Succeeded by: Harriet Harman

Member of Parliament for Dudley North
- In office 1 May 1997 – 11 April 2005
- Preceded by: Constituency Established
- Succeeded by: Ian Austin

Personal details
- Born: 23 July 1948 (age 78) Brisbane, Australia
- Party: Labour
- Education: University of Queensland, Harvard Law School, University of Oxford

Sir Ross Frederick Cranston KC (born 23 July 1948) is a professor of law at London School of Economics and a retired High Court judge. He is also a former British Labour Party politician, and served as the Member of Parliament for Dudley North between 1997 and 2005.

== Early life ==
Cranston was born in Australia, and attended Wavell State High School in Brisbane, Queensland. He was later a student at the University of Queensland where he was awarded a BA in 1969 and LLB in 1970. From Harvard Law School, he gained LLM in 1973. From Oxford University, he was awarded DPhil in 1976 and DCL in 1998. He became a barrister of Gray's Inn in 1976.

Cranston was a professor at London School of Economics from 1992 to 1997 and the holder of the Cassell chair in commercial law from 1993 to 1997. Before that he held academic posts in the UK and Australia, including being a lecturer in the mid-1970s at the University of Warwick and as a professor of Law at Queen Mary and Westfield College from 1986 to 1991, where he held the Sir John Lubbock chair in banking law. He was made a Queen's Counsel in 1998.

== Parliamentary career ==
After contesting Richmond in North Yorkshire in 1992, William Hague's seat, coming third, Cranston was elected as the Member of Parliament for Dudley North at the next general election in 1997 with more than half of the votes cast. He served as Solicitor General from 1998 to 2001, when he returned to the back benches. After speculation amongst colleagues, he announced in 2005 that he would not stand for Parliament again in the 2005 general election. He was succeeded by Ian Austin.

== Legal career ==
Cranston was the Centennial Professor of Law at the LSE from 2005 to 2007, and returned as a professor of law from 2017.

Appointed as a High Court judge in October 2007, he was assigned to the Queen's Bench Division. Marcel Berlins wrote in The Guardian at the time that Cranston's appointment was unusual among judicial appointments in recent years, given that it occurred so soon after the end of his political career. Cranston retired with effect from 16 March 2017. On 4th September 2023 the Department for Business and Trade appointed Sir Ross Cranston to the position of Independent Reviewer for the Group Litigation Order Compensation Scheme.The Government announced the ex-gratia Group Litigation Order Compensation Scheme on 22nd March 2022 with the objective of ensuring postmasters who were part of the GLO and not eligible to seek compensation from the Post Office had access to fair compensation for their Horizon-related losses. The Scheme is run and delivered by the Department for Business and Trade. Final appeals are heard by the independent reviewer. Sir Alan Bates has said he was given a final “take it or leave it” offer, which amounted to 49.2% of his original claim after appealing and being referred to the scheme’s independent reviewer, Sir Ross Cranston.

Parliament of the United Kingdom
New constituency	Member of Parliament for Dudley North; 1997–2005	Succeeded by Ian Austin
Legal offices
Preceded by Lord Falconer of Thoroton	Solicitor General for England and Wales; 1998–2001	Succeeded by Harriet Harman
