= 2019 Walsall Metropolitan Borough Council election =

2019 UK local government election

- 2 May 2019

20 of 60 seats on Walsall Council 31 seats needed for a majority

| | First party | Second party | Third party |
|---|---|---|---|
| Party | Conservative | Labour | Liberal Democrats |
- 2019 local election results in Walsall.
Council control after election
TBD

The 2019 Walsall Metropolitan Borough Council election took place on 2 May 2019, to elect members of the Walsall Metropolitan Borough Council in England. It was held on the same day as other local elections. The Conservatives took control of the council

== Results by Ward ==
=== Aldridge Central and South ===
Aldridge Central and South
| Party | Candidate | Votes | % | ±% |
|---|---|---|---|---|
| Conservative | Pardeep Kaur | 1,678 | 47.6 | ▼5.2 |
| UKIP | Barbara Dickens | 774 | 21.9 | New |
| Labour | Misbhaur Rahman | 594 | 16.8 | ▼2.0 |
| Liberal Democrats | Paul Bramwell | 349 | 9.9 | ▲1.5 |
| Green | Guan Chan | 132 | 3.7 | New |
| Majority | | 904 | 25.7 | |
| Conservative hold | | Swing | | |

=== Aldridge North and Walsall Wood ===
Aldridge North and Walsall Wood
| Party | Candidate | Votes | % | ±% |
|---|---|---|---|---|
| Conservative | Arthur Clarke | 1,327 | 52.4 | ▼16.3 |
| Labour | Amy Wolfs | 658 | 26.0 | ▼5.3 |
| UKIP | Anthony Williams-Rabone | 547 | 21.6 | New |
| Majority | | | | |
| Conservative hold | | Swing | | |

=== Bentley and Darlaston North ===
Bentley and Darlaston North
| Party | Candidate | Votes | % | ±% |
|---|---|---|---|---|
| Labour | Saiqa Nasreen | 1,189 | 51.5 | ▼21.7 |
| UKIP | Bruce Bennett | 463 | 20.1 | New |
| Conservative | Andrew Forrester | 354 | 15.3 | ▼11.5 |
| Independent | Stuart Chapman | 301 | 13.0 | N/A |
| Majority | | | | |
| Labour hold | | Swing | | |

=== Birchills-Leamore ===
Birchills-Leamore
| Party | Candidate | Votes | % | ±% |
|---|---|---|---|---|
| Conservative | Gazanfer Ali | 1,286 | 51.6 | ▲2.4 |
| Labour | Christopher Jones | 1,208 | 48.4 | ▼2.4 |
| Majority | | | | |
| Conservative gain from Labour | | Swing | | |

=== Blakenall ===
Blakenall
| Party | Candidate | Votes | % | ±% |
|---|---|---|---|---|
| Labour | Patricia Young | 1,098 | 51.4 | ▲3.7 |
| Independent | Peter Smith | 725 | 33.9 | ▲1.5 |
| Conservative | Parbinder Kang | 230 | 10.8 | ▼7.2 |
| Green | Shaun McKenzie | 83 | 3.9 | ▼2.0 |
| Majority | | | | |
| Labour hold | | Swing | | |

=== Bloxwich East ===
Bloxwich East
| Party | Candidate | Votes | % | ±% |
|---|---|---|---|---|
| Conservative | Corin Statham | 1,102 | 53.1 | ▲2.6 |
| Labour | Shaun Fitzpatrick | 975 | 46.9 | ▼2.6 |
| Majority | | | | |
| Conservative gain from Labour | | Swing | | |

=== Bloxwich West ===
Bloxwich West
| Party | Candidate | Votes | % | ±% |
|---|---|---|---|---|
| Conservative | Matthew Follows | 1,522 | 64.2 | ▲4.2 |
| Labour | Patricia Lane | 850 | 35.8 | ▼4.2 |
| Majority | | | | |
| Conservative hold | | Swing | | |

=== Brownhills ===
Brownhills
| Party | Candidate | Votes | % | ±% |
|---|---|---|---|---|
| Conservative | Kenneth Ferguson | 1,054 | 36.6 | ▼17.0 |
| Independent | Ian Neville | 759 | 26.4 | N/A |
| Labour | David Morgan | 624 | 21.7 | ▼14.6 |
| UKIP | Derek Bennett | 440 | 15.3 | ▲8.9 |
| Majority | | | | |
| Conservative hold | | Swing | | |

=== Darlaston South ===
Darlaston South
| Party | Candidate | Votes | % | ±% |
|---|---|---|---|---|
| Labour | Douglas James | 1,042 | 45.5 | ▲4.1 |
| UKIP | Peter Burton | 948 | 41.4 | New |
| Conservative | Sukhdeep Nijjar | 300 | 13.1 | ▼0.5 |
| Majority | | | | |
| Labour hold | | Swing | | |

=== Paddock ===
Paddock
| Party | Candidate | Votes | % | ±% |
|---|---|---|---|---|
| Conservative | Waheed Rasab | 1,986 | 51.3 | ▼1.4 |
| Labour | Nicholas Dodds | 1,392 | 35.9 | ▲2.4 |
| UKIP | Peter Faultless | 288 | 7.4 | ▲2.4 |
| Liberal Democrats | Roger Watts | 208 | 5.4 | ▼1.8 |
| Majority | | | | |
| Conservative hold | | Swing | | |

=== Palfrey ===
Palfrey
| Party | Candidate | Votes | % | ±% |
|---|---|---|---|---|
| Labour | Hajran Bashir | 2,426 | 62.9 | ▼5.9 |
| Conservative | Mohammed Yaqoob | 1,105 | 28.7 | ▼2.5 |
| Liberal Democrats | Mohammad Roshid | 323 | 8.4 | New |
| Majority | | | | |
| Labour hold | | Swing | | |

=== Pelsall ===
Pelsall
| Party | Candidate | Votes | % | ±% |
|---|---|---|---|---|
| Conservative | Marco Longhi | 1,449 | 56.0 | ▼7.8 |
| UKIP | Graham Eardley | 649 | 25.1 | ▲15.4 |
| Labour | Jonathan Maltman | 489 | 18.9 | ▼3.5 |
| Majority | | | | |
| Conservative hold | | Swing | | |

=== Pheasey Park Farm ===
Pheasey Park Farm
| Party | Candidate | Votes | % | ±% |
|---|---|---|---|---|
| Conservative | Michael Bird | 1,343 | 54.1 | ▼8.1 |
| Labour | Andrea Bradley | 602 | 24.3 | ▼2.3 |
| UKIP | Steven Gray | 536 | 21.6 | ▲15.2 |
| Majority | | | | |
| Conservative hold | | Swing | | |

=== Pleck ===
Pleck
| Party | Candidate | Votes | % | ±% |
|---|---|---|---|---|
| Labour | Khizar Hussain | 2,123 | 78.5 | ▼1.6 |
| Conservative | Jasbant Singh | 582 | 21.5 | ▲1.6 |
| Majority | | | | |
| Labour hold | | Swing | | |

=== Rushall-Shelfield ===
Rushall-Shelfield
| Party | Candidate | Votes | % | ±% |
|---|---|---|---|---|
| Conservative | Lorna Rattigan | 1,110 | 41.5 | ▼11.5 |
| Labour | Kathryn Smith | 804 | 30.1 | ▼9.8 |
| UKIP | Mark Dickens | 569 | 21.3 | New |
| Green | Liam Allen | 192 | 7.2 | ▲3.7 |
| Majority | | | | |
| Conservative hold | | Swing | | |

=== St Matthew's ===
St Matthew's
| Party | Candidate | Votes | % | ±% |
|---|---|---|---|---|
| Labour | Farhana Mazhar | 1,800 | 47.9 | ▼3.7 |
| Conservative | Mohammed Matloob | 1,349 | 35.9 | ▲0.6 |
| Green | Susan Webster | 358 | 9.5 | ▼0.4 |
| Liberal Democrats | Jonathan Bates | 252 | 6.7 | New |
| Majority | | | | |
| Labour hold | | Swing | | |

=== Short Heath ===
Short Heath
| Party | Candidate | Votes | % | ±% |
|---|---|---|---|---|
| Conservative | Sarah-Jane Cooper | 1,025 | 46.4 | ▲6.1 |
| Labour | Carl Brown | 653 | 29.6 | ▲3.0 |
| Liberal Democrats | Mohammad Yaqub | 529 | 24.0 | ▼0.8 |
| Majority | | | | |
| Conservative hold | | Swing | | |

=== Streetly ===
Streetly
| Party | Candidate | Votes | % | ±% |
|---|---|---|---|---|
| Conservative | Satvinder Johal | 1,675 | 51.3 | ▼18.9 |
| Liberal Democrats | Jennifer Gray | 679 | 20.8 | ▲11.5 |
| UKIP | Kay Davies-Tinsley | 562 | 17.2 | New |
| Labour | Shahin Akhtar | 348 | 10.7 | ▼9.8 |
| Majority | | | | |
| Conservative hold | | Swing | | |

=== Willenhall North ===
Willenhall North
| Party | Candidate | Votes | % | ±% |
|---|---|---|---|---|
| Conservative | Adam Hicken | 1,072 | 45.1 | ▲3.4 |
| Liberal Democrats | Stuart Hodges | 794 | 33.4 | ▲11.4 |
| Labour | Mehreen Afzal | 512 | 21.5 | ▼5.7 |
| Majority | | | | |
| Conservative hold | | Swing | | |

=== Willenhall South ===
Willenhall South
| Party | Candidate | Votes | % | ±% |
|---|---|---|---|---|
| Labour | Carl Creaney | 1,445 | 61.9 | ▲4.5 |
| Conservative | Amandeep Garcha | 928 | 39.1 | ▲3.4 |
| Majority | | | | |
| Labour hold | | Swing | | |
