= Kingswinford and South Staffordshire =

UK Parliament constituency (since 2024)

Coordinates: 52.54°N 2.21°W

- County constituency for the House of Commons
- Interactive map of boundaries since 2024
- Boundary within the West Midlands region
- County: Staffordshire
- Electorate: 71,896 (2023)
- Major settlements: Kingswinford, Wombourne, Codsall, Perton

Current constituency
- Created: 2024
- Member of Parliament: Michael Wood (Conservative)
- Seats: One
- Created from: South Staffordshire; Dudley South

Kingswinford and South Staffordshire is a constituency of the House of Commons in the UK Parliament, represented since its establishment for the 2024 general election by Michael Wood of the Conservative Party. The constituency is one of multiple constituencies created by 2023 review of Westminster constituencies which span multiple counties. The constituency name refers to town of Kingswinford and the South Staffordshire District.

== Constituency profile ==
Kingswinford and South Staffordshire is a constituency located in the West Midlands region. It covers the villages of Wombourne, Perton, Codsall, Bilbrook and Kinver within Staffordshire and the town of Kingswinford in the Metropolitan Borough of Dudley. The constituency is largely rural and its towns and villages house many retirees and commuters to the nearby cities of Wolverhampton and Birmingham. The constituency is generally affluent with low levels of deprivation. The average house price is below the national average but higher than the rest of the West Midlands.

In general, residents of the constituency are older and more religious compared to the rest of the country. They have average levels of education and high rates of income, homeownership and professional employment. A high proportion of residents work in manufacturing and education. White people made up 94% of the population at the 2021 census. At the local council level, most of the constituency is represented by Conservatives with some Reform UK councillors elected in Perton and Liberal Democrats elected in Kinver. Voters strongly supported leaving the European Union in the 2016 referendum; an estimated 64% voted in favour of Brexit compared to the nationwide figure of 52%.

== Boundaries ==
The constituency is composed of the following as they existed on 1 December 2020:

- The Metropolitan Borough of Dudley wards of Kingswinford North and Wall Heath, Kingswinford South, and Wordsley^{1}.
- The District of South Staffordshire wards of Bilbrook, Codsall, Himley & Swindon, Kinver & Enville, Pattingham, Trysull, Bobbington & Lower Penn, Perton East, Perton Lakeside, Perton Wrottesley, Wombourne North, and Wombourne South.

^{1} Renamed Wordsley North following a local government boundary review in Dudley which became effective from May 2024.

The seat was created from the following areas:

- The majority of the former South Staffordshire constituency, including the communities of Codsall, Perton and Wombourne
- Kingswinford and Wordsley from the abolished Dudley South constituency

== Members of Parliament ==
South Staffordshire and Dudley South prior to 2024

Election	Member	Party
2024	Michael Wood	Conservative

== Elections ==
=== Elections in the 2020s ===
General election 2024: Kingswinford and South Staffordshire
Party	Candidate	Votes	%	±%
Conservative	Mike Wood	18,199	40.3	−34.0
Labour	Sally Benton	11,896	26.3	+9.5
Reform	Gary Dale	9,928	22.0	N/A
Liberal Democrats	Gully Bansal	2,080	4.6	−0.7
Green	Claire McIlvenna	2,077	4.6	+1.1
Independent	Shaz Saleem	1,000	2.2	N/A
Majority		6,303	14.0	−43.5
Turnout		45,180	63.0	−8.0
Registered electors		71,662		
Conservative hold		Swing	−21.8	

Changes are from the notional results of the 2019 election on the new boundaries.

=== Elections in the 2010s ===
2019 notional result
Party	Vote	%
Conservative	37,942	74.3
Labour	8,587	16.8
Liberal Democrats	2,715	5.3
Green	1,803	3.5
Turnout	51,047	71.0
Electorate	71,896	

== See also ==
- parliamentary constituencies in Staffordshire
- List of parliamentary constituencies in West Midlands (region)
