= Colin Phipps =

Welsh politician, petroleum geologist and journalist

Dr Colin Phipps MP

Member of Parliament for Dudley West
- In office 28 February 1974 – 7 April 1979
- Preceded by: Constituency established
- Succeeded by: John Blackburn

Personal details
- Born: Colin Barry Phipps; 2 July 1934 Swansea, Wales
- Died: 10 January 2009 (aged 74) Birmingham, England
- Party: Labour (until 1981); SDP (1981–88) 'Continuing' SDP (1988–90)
- Spouse: Marion Lawrey (m. 1956)
- Children: 4
- Education: University College London; University of Birmingham

Colin Barry Phipps (23 July 1934 – 10 January 2009) was a British petroleum geologist and chairman of several petroleum companies. From 1974 to 1979 he was a Labour Party Member of Parliament, but in the 1980s he joined the Social Democratic Party (SDP).

== Early life and studies ==
Colin Barry Phipps was born in Swansea on 23 July 1934. He attended Townfield Elementary School in Hayes, Middlesex, then Acton County Grammar School and the Bishop Gore School, Swansea. From University College London he gained a BSc in Geology in 1955; and a PhD in Geology from the University of Birmingham in 1957.

== Career ==
=== Parliament ===
Phipps first stood as a Labour parliamentary candidate in the Walthamstow East by-election in March 1969, where he lost decisively.

He served as Member of Parliament for Dudley West from February 1974 to 1979, when he stood down. His successes in the oil industry made him one of the more wealthy Labour MPs, as demonstrated by the fact that during parliamentary elections he was often seen campaigning in a Rolls-Royce limousine. Firmly on the right of the party, Phipps was a supporter of the EEC but opposed to Scottish and Welsh devolution, while his business background left him with a liberal attitude to economics and taxation that was arguably closer to Thatcherism than to mainstream social democracy. Following his departure from the House of Commons, Phipps was (along with Michael Barnes and Dick Taverne) one of the early "outriders" agitating for a split in the Labour Party, forming the Association of Democratic Groups in the West Midlands as a platform for his political ambitions.

A signatory to the Limehouse Declaration, Phipps eagerly joined the Social Democratic Party (SDP) when it was established by the Gang of Four in 1981, unsuccessfully standing for the party in Worcester at the 1983 general election and Stafford in 1987. A member of the party's national committee, he chose not to support the merger with the Liberals in 1988, instead following David Owen into the 'continuing' SDP. Although by now a convinced populist free-marketeer, after the dissolution of the Owenite SDP in 1990 Phipps nevertheless cautiously embraced Labour once again as the "only hope" for social democracy, while maintaining that it must first "untie its links with the unions and rid itself of the class-struggle left".

=== Geology ===
After receiving his doctorate in 1957 Phipps worked with Shell in Venezuela, the Netherlands and the United States. In 1964, well before North Sea oil was known about, he left Shell and became an independent geology consultant and in 1973 founded Clyde Petroleum, which had many involvements in North Sea oil. While working with this company he was also an MP from 1974 to 1979. He became the company's chief executive from 1979 to 1983 and its chairman from 1983 to 1995.

From 1989 to 2002 Phipps was chairman of Greenwich Resources, a gold mining company. He was chairman of the English String Orchestra (and was also involved with the English Symphony Orchestra) and Falklands Conservation from 1990 to 1992.

In 1996 he founded Desire Petroleum, remaining chairman until his death in 2009. Although Phipps had visited the Falkland Islands in 1975, he did not become hopeful about oil prospects in the area until 2004, when a seismic survey of the geology showed considerable quantities of oil.

== Personal life ==
In 1956 he married Marion Lawrey, and they had two sons and two daughters.

Phipps died on 10 January 2009, in a Birmingham hospital.

He owned a 195-acre (0.79 km^{2}) farm in Worcestershire.

== See also ==
- Vince Cable

== Sources ==
- Times Guide to the House of Commons October 1974
- Leigh Rayment's Peerage Pages

Parliament of the United Kingdom
New constituency	Member of Parliament for Dudley West; Feb. 1974–1979	Succeeded by John Blackburn
