= Afzal Amin =

British Army Officer and politician

Afzal Raja Amin is a British former Conservative Party aspirant politician and former prospective parliamentary candidate for Dudley North constituency for the 2015 general election until his resignation over claims of conspiring with the involvement of Tommy Robinson's English Defence League. He served as an officer in the British Army for eleven years.

== Personal life ==
Afzal Amin grew up in the Black Country and went to schools in Smethwick and Oldbury, before going to Sandwell College. His parents migrated to Britain from Pakistan. Amin studied Arabic and studied in Mauritania and then went on to gain a degree from SOAS.

He has been married to his wife Michelle for twenty years and they have two adult children together.

== Military career ==
Amin's grandfather was a military policeman in the British Indian Army and served several tours in Europe during World War II. He then joined the Royal Engineers as a Territorial Army soldier in Oldbury. He was commissioned second lieutenant on the General List in August 1999.

Amin resigned his TA commission in January 2002 to attend the Royal Military Academy Sandhurst and was commissioned into the Educational and Training Services Branch of the Adjutant General's Corps (Regular Army) in April 2003. He was promoted lieutenant.

He saw operational service in Iraq and three times in Afghanistan. He was chairman of the Armed Forces Muslim Association. His last posting was at the Army’s Counterinsurgency and Stabilisation Centre. Additionally, he was employed as a visiting researcher and lecturer for the UK Defence Academy's Research and Assessment Branch. He claims to have served as education officer to both Prince William and Prince Harry. He was promoted captain in October 2005 and retired from the Army in April 2013.

== Political career ==
Amin was selected as the Conservative Prospective Parliamentary Candidate for the marginal seat of Dudley North in February 2013.

However, in March 2015, Amin was suspended from the Conservative Party for allegedly collaborating with the English Defence League in an attempt to win votes. He claimed he was the victim of a sting. Amin was secretly recorded plotting by Tommy Robinson, formerly of the EDL. Amin promised to be an “unshakeable ally” for the EDL in parliament and to help bring their views to the mainstream. Amin denied any wrongdoing but resigned as the Conservative election candidate on 23 March 2015.

On 26 March, Amin was replaced by new Conservative Parliamentary Candidate Les Jones.
