= John Blackburn (politician) =

British politician

Member of Parliament for Dudley West
- In office 3 May 1979 – 12 October 1994
- Preceded by: Colin Phipps
- Succeeded by: Ian Pearson

Personal details
- Born: John Graham Blackburn; 2 September 1933 Eccles, England
- Died: 12 October 1994 (aged 61) London, England
- Party: Conservative
- Spouse: Marjorie Thompson (m. 1958)
- Children: 2
- Profession: Police officer; businessman

John Graham Blackburn (2 September 1933 – 12 October 1994) was a Conservative member of parliament in the United Kingdom. He represented the constituency of Dudley West from 1979 until his death in 1994.

== Early years ==
Blackburn was born in Eccles, the son of Charles and Grace Blackburn. He attended Liverpool Collegiate School, and studied at the University of Liverpool and Free University, Berlin, where he completed a PhD. From 1953 to 1965 he served as a police officer in Liverpool, which (together with his hardline views on law and order) earned him the moniker "PC Plod" whilst in parliament. He married Marjorie Thompson in 1958, and they had two children.

Rising to the position of detective sergeant, Blackburn left Liverpool City Police to join Solway Engineering Co. Ltd., where he became a sales director. He later served as a councillor in Wolverhampton, representing Merry Hill ward on the city council until 1980.

== Political career ==
Blackburn was elected to the House of Commons at the 1979 general election with a majority of 1,139, gaining the seat from Labour. He subsequently held the seat at the 1983, 1987 and 1992 elections. A right-winger, he supported the reintroduction of capital and corporal punishment, was a fervent Zionist, and opposed abortion, the EEC and the African National Congress, which he considered to be a terrorist organisation. In 1982, he unsuccessfully argued in parliament for the retention of the Round Oak Steelworks in Brierley Hill, which closed in December of that year with the loss of nearly 1,300 jobs, and which was later redeveloped as the Waterfront leisure and commercial complex.

== Death ==
Shortly before midnight on 11 October 1994, Blackburn had a heart attack while leaving the House of Commons. He was taken to St Thomas' Hospital, where he died early the following morning, at the age of 61. A by-election was held for his seat, which was won by Labour's Ian Pearson on the biggest swing since the Second World War, winning nearly 70% of the vote. Following boundary changes, Pearson then became Labour MP for the new Dudley South constituency after the 1997 election.

== Sources ==
- Times Guide to the House of Commons, 1992 and 1997 editions

Parliament of the United Kingdom
Preceded by Colin Phipps	Member of Parliament for Dudley West; 1979–1994	Succeeded by Ian Pearson
