= Mike Wood (Conservative politician) =

British politician (born 1976)

Mike Wood MP
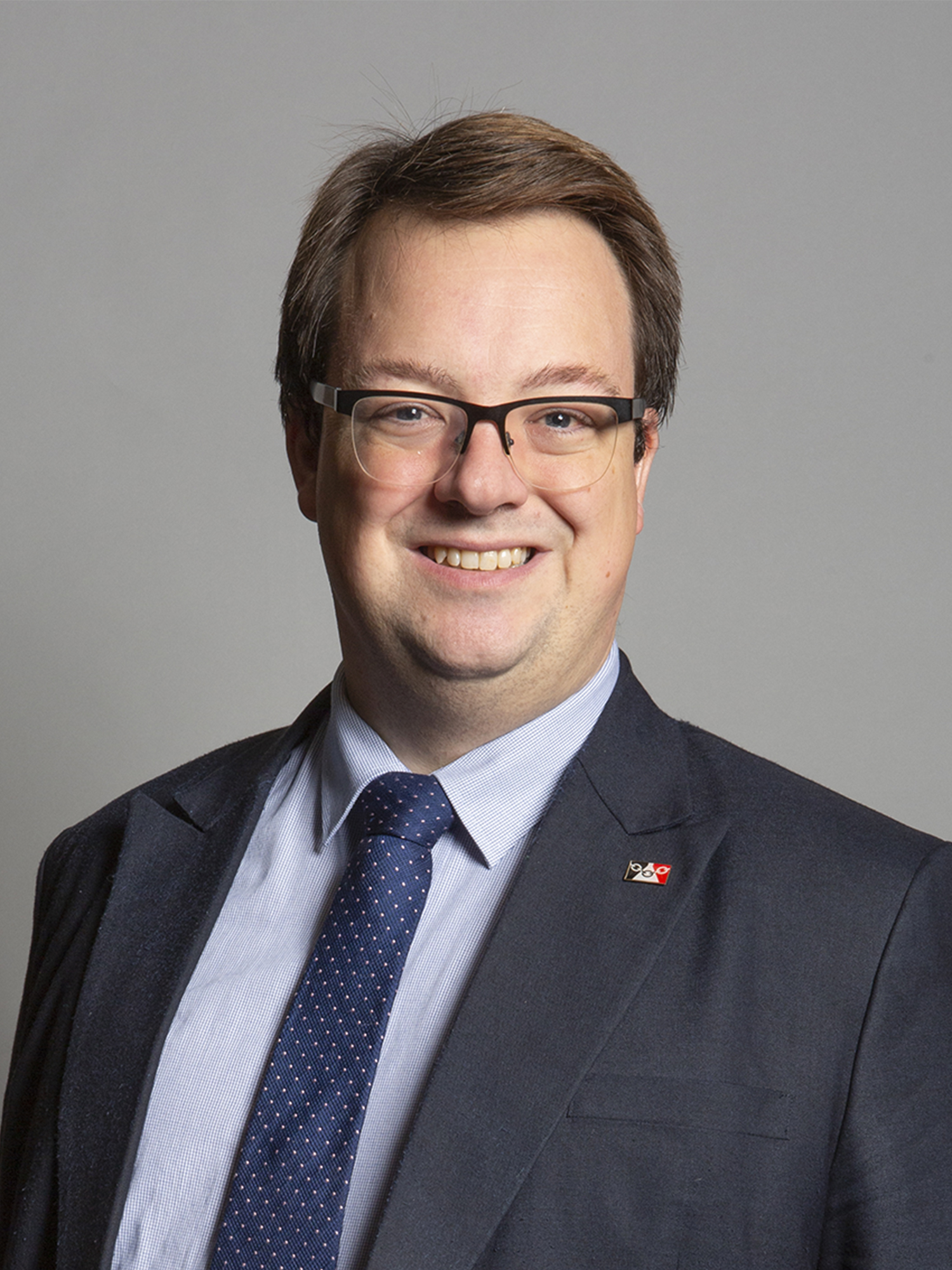
- Official portrait, 2019

Shadow Minister for the Cabinet Office
- Incumbent
- Assumed office 6 November 2024
- Leader: Kemi Badenoch
- Preceded by: The Baroness Neville-Rolfe

Lord Commissioner of the Treasury
- In office 14 November 2023 – 5 July 2024
- Prime Minister: Rishi Sunak

Assistant Government Whip
- In office 27 October 2022 – 14 November 2023
- Prime Minister: Rishi Sunak

Member of Parliament for Kingswinford and South Staffordshire Dudley South (2015–2024)
- Incumbent
- Assumed office 7 May 2015
- Preceded by: Christopher Kelly
- Majority: 6,303 (14.0%)

Personal details
- Born: 17 March 1976 (age 50)
- Party: Conservative
- Education: Aberystwyth University; Cardiff University
- Website: Campaign website

Michael Jon Wood (born 17 March 1976) is a British Conservative Party politician. He has been the Member of Parliament (MP) for Kingswinford and South Staffordshire since July 2024. Prior to this he served as MP for Dudley South from May 2015 until the constituency's dissolution. He has been Shadow Minister for the Cabinet Office since November 2024.

== Early life and career ==
Wood was born on 17 March 1976. He attended Old Swinford Hospital – a state-run boarding school in Oldswinford, before studying Economics & Law at Aberystwyth University. He completed a Bar Vocational Course at Cardiff University in 1999. After graduating from university, Wood went to work for Alexander Macmillan, 2nd Earl of Stockton, Conservative MEP for South West England. Following this, he worked for four years as a policy advisor in the European Parliament, before returning to the UK to work for the Conservative MPs Andrew Griffiths and James Morris.

== Political career ==
Shortly after completing his undergraduate degree, Wood first stood for office as a Conservative Party candidate in 1998 when he competed in the Quarry Bank & Cradley ward on Dudley Metropolitan Borough Council. He was unsuccessful, gaining less than half of the votes of his Labour Party rival. He stood in the same ward in May 1999, again losing by a similar margin. He stood in the Quarry Bank & Dudley Wood ward in 2008, 2010 and 2011 and was defeated by the Labour candidate on all three occasions. In May 2012, Wood again stood unsuccessfully, but in the Halesowen North ward. However, he was elected as one of three councillors representing the ward of Pedmore and Stourbridge East in May 2014.

The following year, Wood was elected as MP for Dudley South and made his maiden speech in the House of Commons on 1 June 2015.

He was successful in the ballot held on 4 June 2015 to obtain the right to introduce a Private Members' Bill. The first reading of the bill entitled Riot Compensation was held on 24 June 2015. The Bill aimed to repeal the Riot (Damages) Act 1886 and make various changes to the procedures of obtaining compensation for property damaged in riots. The Bill passed through all the stages of debate and scrutiny in the UK Parliament and received royal assent on 23 March 2016. It became an Act of Parliament on 24 March 2016.

In May 2016, it was reported that Wood was one of a number of Conservative MPs being investigated by police in the 2015 general election party spending investigation, for allegedly spending more than the legal limit on constituency election campaign expenses. In May 2017, the Crown Prosecution Service said that while there was evidence of inaccurate spending returns, it did not "meet the test" for further action.

In the House of Commons he sat on the European Scrutiny Committee between November 2016 and May 2017. He was supportive of Brexit prior to the 2016 referendum.

Wood has served as Parliamentary private secretary (PPS) to Secretary of State for International Trade Liam Fox and Home Secretary Priti Patel. In the 2021 cabinet reshuffle he was appointed PPS to Deputy Prime Minister Dominic Raab.

He also served on the Parliamentary Assembly Council of Europe from November 2015 until September 2017, during which time Wood contracted sepsis.

Wood served as a full member of the Organization for Security and Co-operation in Europe delegation from the UK Parliament. On 12 January 2022 Prime Minister Boris Johnson announced Wood had been replaced in this role by Mark Pritchard.

In the November 2023 British cabinet reshuffle, Wood was appointed a Lord Commissioner of the Treasury.

Wood's constituency of Dudley South was abolished following the calling of the 2024 general election, as the 2023 review of Westminster constituencies had decided to replace it with the new constituency of Kingswinford and South Staffordshire. Wood wrote an editorial for a local paper on 29 May 2024 in which he announced his candidacy for the new Kingswinford seat. On 5 July Wood was duly elected as MP for the new constituency with 18,199 votes, beating rival candidate Sally Benton.

Parliament of the United Kingdom
Preceded by Chris Kelly	Member of Parliament for Dudley South; 2015–2024	Constituency abolished
New constituency	Member of Parliament for Kingswinford and South Staffordshire; 2024–present	Incumbent
