= Ian Pearson =

British Labour Party politician

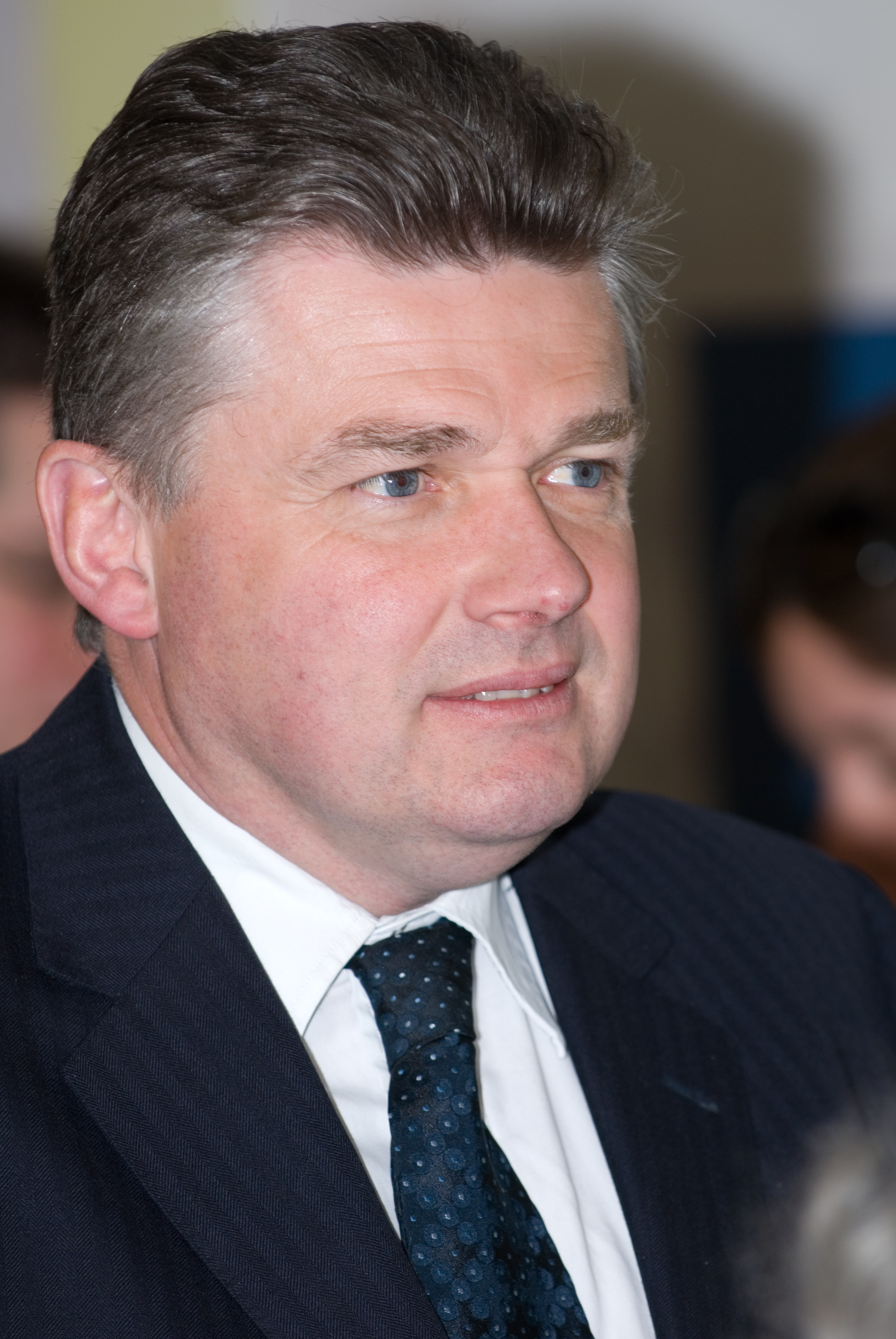
- Pearson in 2007

Economic Secretary to the Treasury
- In office 5 October 2008 – 11 May 2010
- Prime Minister: Gordon Brown
- Preceded by: Kitty Ussher
- Succeeded by: Justine Greening

Parliamentary Under-Secretary of State for Economics and Business
- In office 5 October 2008 – 9 June 2009
- Prime Minister: Gordon Brown
- Preceded by: Gareth Thomas
- Succeeded by: The Baroness Vadera

Minister of State for Science and Innovation
- In office 28 June 2007 – 5 October 2008
- Prime Minister: Gordon Brown
- Preceded by: Malcolm Wicks
- Succeeded by: The Lord Drayson

Minister of State for Climate Change and the Environment
- In office 8 May 2006 – 28 June 2007
- Prime Minister: Tony Blair
- Preceded by: Elliot Morley
- Succeeded by: Phil Woolas

Minister of State for Trade
- In office 11 May 2005 – 8 May 2006
- Prime Minister: Tony Blair
- Preceded by: Douglas Alexander
- Succeeded by: Ian McCartney

Lord Commissioner of the Treasury
- In office 29 May 2002 – 13 June 2003
- Prime Minister: Tony Blair
- Preceded by: David Clelland (2001)
- Succeeded by: Jim Murphy

Member of Parliament for Dudley South Dudley West (1994–1997)
- In office 15 December 1994 – 12 April 2010
- Preceded by: John Blackburn
- Succeeded by: Chris Kelly

Personal details
- Born: Ian Phares Pearson; 5 April 1959 (age 67) Dudley, Worcestershire, England
- Party: Labour
- Education: University of Warwick, Balliol College, Oxford

Ian Phares Pearson (born 5 April 1959) is a British politician and former Member of Parliament from 1994 until 2010, representing Dudley West from 1994 to 1997 and then Dudley South from 1997 until 2010. He served as Economic Secretary to the Treasury from 2008 to 2010. Pearson is the chairman of EQTEC and a non-executive board member of Thames Water.

== Early life ==
Pearson was educated at Brierley Hill Grammar School and Balliol College, Oxford (BA Philosophy, Politics, and Economics) and the University of Warwick (MA, PhD).

== Career ==
=== Politics ===
Having unsuccessfully contested Bexhill and Battle in the 1983 general election, Pearson entered parliament for Dudley West in a by-election in December 1994, winning a Conservative seat left vacant by the death of John Blackburn in October of that year. He won the seat with nearly 70% of the votes, with the Conservative candidate receiving less than 20%.

Boundary changes created the new constituency of Dudley South in 1997 which he then represented.

Pearson was Parliamentary private secretary to the Paymaster General Geoffrey Robinson from 1997 until Robinson resigned in 1998. In 2001 he returned to the government as a whip. In 2002 he moved to the Northern Ireland Office as a Parliamentary Under-Secretary of State. After the 2005 general election he was promoted to Minister of State for Trade in the Foreign and Commonwealth Office.

In the PM's 2006 reshuffle, he was appointed as Minister of State for Climate Change and Environment at the Department for Environment, Food and Rural Affairs.

In an interview with The Guardian published on 5 January 2007, Pearson courted considerable controversy by publicly criticising several airlines, particularly Ryanair, for failing to pull their weight in lowering UK carbon emissions. He described Ryanair as "the irresponsible face of capitalism". In response, Michael O'Leary, the CEO of Ryanair, claimed Ryanair had made a considerable investment in environmentally friendly planes and technologies and had the lowest fuel use per passenger figures of any British airline. O'Leary described Pearson as "silly", adding that Pearson "hadn't a clue what he [was] talking about".

On 29 June 2007, Pearson was moved in Gordon Brown's first reshuffle to become a Minister of State in the newly created Department for Innovation, Universities and Skills under Secretary of State John Denham. Whilst there he was criticised for not doing anything to avert a funding crisis at the Science and Technology Facilities Council hitting UK Astronomy and particle physics. In Gordon Brown's next reshuffle of 3 October 2008, Pearson was moved to the Treasury as Economic Secretary, also becoming Parliamentary Under-Secretary of State for Economics and Business. In the June 2009 reshuffle Pearson retained his role at the Treasury but lost his business role as the department was merged to create the Department for Business, Innovation and Skills.

On 21 January 2010, Pearson announced that he would not contest the next general election.

=== Business ===
Pearson has been a non-executive director of Thames Water, a British water utility company, since 2014. He is a non-executive chairman of EQTEC PLC, an Irish multinational gasification company. He is also a non-executive chairman of the quantum technology company Quantum Exponential.

Parliament of the United Kingdom
Preceded by John Blackburn	Member of Parliament for Dudley West; 1994–1997	Constituency abolished
New constituency	Member of Parliament for Dudley South; 1997 – 2010	Succeeded by Chris Kelly
Political offices
Preceded by Malcolm Wicks	Minister of State for Science and Innovation; 2007–2008	Succeeded by The Lord Drayson
Preceded by Gareth Thomas (Promoted to Minister at the DBERR)	Parliamentary Under-Secretary of State for Economics and Business; 2008 – 2009	Position abolished
Preceded by Kitty Ussher	Economic Secretary to the Treasury; 2008–2010	Succeeded by Justine Greening
