= Marco Longhi =

British politician (born 1967)

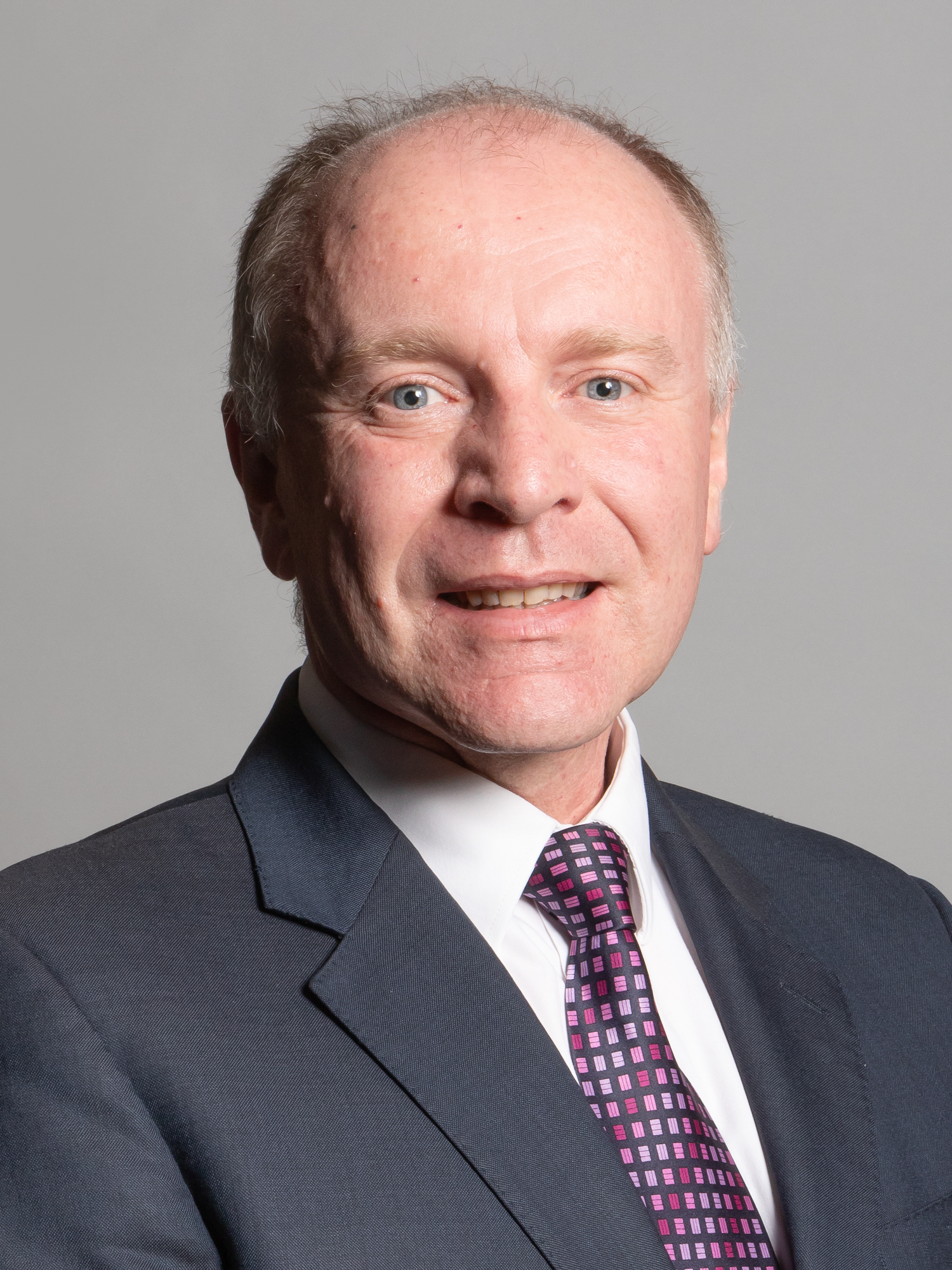
- Official portrait, 2020

President of Turning Point UK
- Incumbent
- Assumed office 2022

Member of Parliament for Dudley North
- In office 12 December 2019 – 30 May 2024
- Preceded by: Ian Austin
- Succeeded by: Constituency abolished

Personal details
- Born: Marco Andrea Longhi; 22 April 1967 (age 59) Walsall, Staffordshire, England
- Party: Reform UK (from 2025)
- Other political affiliations: Conservative (1999–2025); Turning Point UK (Since 2022)
- Spouse: Andrea Longhi
- Children: 2
- Education: University of Manchester (BEng); University of Warwick (MBA)
- Profession: Politician
- Website: marcolonghi.org.uk

Marco Andrea Longhi (born 22 April 1967) is a British politician who served as the Conservative Member of Parliament (MP) for Dudley North from 2019 to 2024. In January 2025, he defected to Reform UK. Since 2022, Longhi has served as President of Turning Point UK.

== Early life and career ==
Marco Longhi was born on 22 April 1967 in Walsall, England and grew up in Rome, Italy, the son of an Italian airline worker, Antonio Longhi, and a British mother, Josephine Clarke. He trained as a pilot and later studied at the University of Manchester, following this by working for a time in civil engineering. He then worked in the oil and gas industry, which included five years in South America.

== Parliamentary career ==
Longhi joined the Conservative Party in 1999. That same year, he was elected as a Conservative councillor in Walsall (where his grandfather Wilfred Clarke had been Mayor in 1978), and became Mayor in 2017 and again in 2018.

At the 2005 general election Longhi unsuccessfully stood for election in Dudley South, finishing second with 34.5% of the vote behind the incumbent Labour Party MP Ian Pearson.

Longhi was elected as MP for Dudley North at the 2019 general election, winning with 63.1% of the vote and a majority of 11,533 votes.

Following an interim report on the connections between colonialism and properties in the care of the National Trust, including links with historic slavery, Longhi was among the signatories of a letter to The Daily Telegraph in November 2020 from the "Common Sense Group" of Conservative parliamentarians. The letter accused the National Trust of being "coloured by cultural Marxist dogma, colloquially known as the 'woke agenda'".

Despite his anti-woke views, as part of the official International Day against Homophobia, Biphobia and Transphobia, Longhi hosted the Dudley commemoration, adding that "… being different can be a force for good; and being different can make the world a lot more interesting. Most prejudices are products of fear, and fears arise from a lack of understanding and knowledge. This is why I like to talk about difference in a positive way rather simply being against something, in this case homophobia, biphobia and transphobia."

On 23 August 2021, Prime Minister Boris Johnson appointed Longhi as the UK's trade envoy to Brazil.

In May 2022, Longhi called for the "Stop Brexit Man" Steve Bray to be "locked up in the Tower with a loudspeaker playing 'Land of Hope and Glory' on repeat at maximum volume" because of the disruption he causes. He added that Bray was "griping for any little bit of press coverage" and claimed that staff in his Westminster office could not hear "distressed constituents on the phone" because of the loud music that Bray played.

In June 2022, Longhi, in a private message directed to the Archbishop of Canterbury Justin Welby, about the government's Rwanda asylum plan, said, "Archbishop, as you appear to feel so strongly about this, will you give up two of your palaces for illegal migrants and pay for their accommodation?"

Longhi endorsed Kemi Badenoch during the July 2022 Conservative Party leadership election. After Badenoch was eliminated, he backed Liz Truss.

In October 2022, following the resignation of Liz Truss as Prime Minister, Longhi announced that he would be supporting the previous Prime Minister Boris Johnson in the subsequent leadership election.

Longhi was made honorary president of the conservative pressure group Turning Point UK in November 2022.

In February 2024, Longhi, who is a landlord owning ten properties, opposed the government's Renter's Reform bill, which would increase the rights of tenants in rental properties and included a manifesto pledge to ban no-fault evictions.

At the 2024 United Kingdom general election, Longhi was accused of "dog-whistle" tactics against his Labour opponent Sonia Kumar. His campaign sent leaflets to British Pakistani and Kashmiri Muslims drawing attention to Kumar's Hindu surname (writing it in capital letters and underlined), arguing that she would not support Kashmir while in Parliament. Longhi lost his seat to Kumar at the general election.

== Business career ==
Longhi was the director of property management company Justmove (Lettings) Limited, and owns ten houses in Walsall.

Parliament of the United Kingdom
Preceded by Ian Austin	Member of Parliament for Dudley North; 2019–2024	Constituency abolished
