= Dudley South =

UK Parliament constituency (1997–2024)

- Former borough constituency for the House of Commons
- 2010–2024 boundary of Dudley South in West Midlands

- Location of West Midlands within England
- County: West Midlands
- Electorate: 61,308 (December 2010)
- Major settlements: Dudley

1997–2024
- Seats: One
- Created from: Dudley West
- Replaced by: Kingswinford and South Staffordshire; Stourbridge; Dudley (part)

Dudley South was a United Kingdom House of Commons constituency (Note: A borough constituency (for the purposes of election expenses and type of returning officer)) from 1997 until 2024. (Note: As with all constituencies, the constituency elects one Member of Parliament (MP) by the first past the post system of election at least every five years.)

By the decision of the 2023 Periodic Review of Westminster constituencies, the seat was abolished and replaced primarily by the new Kingswinford and South Staffordshire and reconfigured Stourbridge constituencies, with a small part (Note: Brockmoor and Pensnett ward, Metropolitan Borough of Dudley) transferred to Dudley.

== Constituency profile ==
Dudley South is one of four constituencies covering the Metropolitan Borough of Dudley, and covers the central part of the borough to the south of the town centre. The constituency voted strongly for Brexit, and residents' wealth is around average for the UK.

== Boundaries ==
Map of boundaries 2010-2024

1997–2010: The Metropolitan Borough of Dudley wards of Brierley Hill, Brockmoor and Pensnett, Kingswinford North and Wall Heath, Kingswinford South, Netherton and Woodside, St Andrews, and Wordsley.

2010–2024: The Metropolitan Borough of Dudley wards of Brierley Hill, Brockmoor and Pensnett, Kingswinford North and Wall Heath, Kingswinford South, Netherton, Woodside and St Andrews, and Wordsley.

== History ==
Before the 1997 election, Dudley was divided into East and West constituencies, rather than North and South. Dudley South covers most of the area previously covered by Dudley West, which included Sedgley but excluded Netherton.

Dudley West was the scene of a by-election in 1994, held after the death of the Conservative John Blackburn who had represented the constituency since 1979. The by-election was won by Labour's Ian Pearson, who stood for Dudley South in 1997 and held the seat, winning by a comfortable margin each time, until he stood down in 2010.

The Conservative candidate, Chris Kelly, gained the seat in the subsequent general election. However, he decided to stand down in 2015.

Mike Wood retained the seat for the Conservatives in both the 2015 and 2017 general elections, in both cases achieving a swing towards his party and thus bucking the national trend.

== Abolition ==
Further to the completion of the 2023 Periodic Review of Westminster constituencies, the seat was abolished for the 2024 general election, with its contents distributed three ways:

Parts	New constituency	Part of Dudley South, %
Kingswinford, Wall Heath and Wordsley	Kingswinford and South Staffordshire	45.2
Brierley Hill and Netherton	Stourbridge	37.9
The Brockmoor and Pensnett ward	Dudley	16.9

== Members of Parliament ==
Election	Member	Party
1997	Ian Pearson	Labour
2010	Chris Kelly	Conservative
2015	Mike Wood	Conservative
2024	Constituency abolished	

== Election results 1997-2024 ==
=== Elections in the 1990s ===
General election 1997: Dudley South
Party	Candidate	Votes	%	±%
Labour	Ian Pearson	27,124	56.6	
Conservative	Mark Simpson	14,097	29.4	
Liberal Democrats	Richard Burt	5,214	10.9	
Referendum	Connor Birch	1,467	3.1	
Majority		13,027	27.2	
Turnout		47,902	71.8	
Labour win (new seat)				

=== Elections in the 2000s ===
General election 2001: Dudley South
Party	Candidate	Votes	%	±%
Labour	Ian Pearson	18,109	49.8	▼6.8
Conservative	Jason Sugarman	11,292	31.1	▲1.7
Liberal Democrats	Lorely Burt	5,421	14.9	▲4.0
UKIP	John Westwood	859	2.4	New
Socialist Alliance	Angela Thompson	663	1.8	New
Majority		6,817	18.7	▼8.5
Turnout		36,344	55.4	▼16.4
Labour hold		Swing	▼4.2	

General election 2005: Dudley South
Party	Candidate	Votes	%	±%
Labour	Ian Pearson	17,800	45.3	▼4.5
Conservative	Marco Longhi	13,556	34.5	▲3.4
Liberal Democrats	Jonathan Bramall	4,808	12.2	▼2.7
BNP	John Salvage	1,841	4.7	New
UKIP	Andrew Benion	1,271	3.2	▲0.8
Majority		4,244	10.8	▼7.9
Turnout		39,276	60.2	▲4.8
Labour hold		Swing	▼3.9	

=== Elections in the 2010s ===
General election 2010: Dudley South
Party	Candidate	Votes	%	±%
Conservative	Chris Kelly	16,450	43.1	▲8.1
Labour	Rachel Harris	12,594	33.0	▼11.0
Liberal Democrats	Jonathan Bramall	5,989	15.7	▲3.0
UKIP	Philip Rowe	3,132	8.2	▲5.0
Majority		3,856	10.1	▼0.7
Turnout		38,165	63.0	▲2.8
Conservative gain from Labour		Swing	▲9.5	

General election 2015: Dudley South
Party	Candidate	Votes	%	±%
Conservative	Mike Wood	16,723	43.8	▲0.7
Labour	Natasha Millward	12,453	32.6	▼0.4
UKIP	Paul Brothwood	7,236	18.9	▲10.7
Green	Vicky Duckworth	970	2.5	New
Liberal Democrats	Martin Turner	828	2.2	▼13.5
Majority		4,270	11.2	▲1.1
Turnout		38,210	63.3	▲0.3
Conservative hold		Swing	▲0.54	

General election 2017: Dudley South
Party	Candidate	Votes	%	±%
Conservative	Mike Wood	21,588	56.4	▲12.6
Labour	Natasha Millward	13,858	36.2	▲3.6
UKIP	Mitchell Bolton	1,791	4.7	▼14.2
Liberal Democrats	Jonathan Bramall	625	1.6	▼0.6
Green	Jenny Maxwell	382	1.0	▼1.5
Majority		7,730	20.2	▲9.0
Turnout		38,244	62.4	▼0.9
Conservative hold		Swing	▲4.55	

General election 2019: Dudley South
Party	Candidate	Votes	%	±%
Conservative	Mike Wood	24,835	67.9	▲11.5
Labour	Lucy Caldicott	9,270	25.3	▼10.9
Liberal Democrats	Jonathan Bramall	1,608	4.4	▲2.8
Green	Cate Mohr	863	2.4	▲1.4
Majority		15,565	42.6	▲22.4
Turnout		36,576	60.2	▼2.2
Conservative hold		Swing	▲11.2	

== See also ==
- List of parliamentary constituencies in the West Midlands (county)
- List of parliamentary constituencies in Dudley
