= Forgent =

Irish bioscience energy company

Forgent plc
- Type: Public
- Traded as: AIM: EQT
- ISIN: IE00BH3XCL94
- Industry: Energy
- Founded: Cork, Ireland (2005)
- Headquarters: Cork, Ireland
- Key people: David Palumbo CEO

Forgent plc, formerly known as REACT Energy plc, EQTEC plc, and Kedco plc, is a bioscience energy company operating in the United Kingdom and Ireland which was established in 2005.

== Stock market listing ==
Kedco floated on the Alternative Investment Market (AIM) of the London Stock Exchange on Monday 20 October 2008. Kedco was admitted to the AIM at 17.5c per share giving the company a market capitalisation of €35 million. Share price since launch spiked at over 30 cent a share before falling over the following months and as of early May 2010 stands at 7 cent a share. The company has made significant losses since its foundation in 2005, however losses have fallen along with revenue since an investment by FBD and entry into the LSE. On 17 February 2010 the company announced that it had "been unable to secure financing on suitable terms" for a development in Newry and that it may have to "pursue alternative means of maintaining adequate cash reserves including management of its working capital position". On 10 May 2010 the company admitted that it had still not been successful in finding alternative funding and announced the appointment of external advisers to assist in this aim. The company was subsequently able to source adequate funding to meet its day to day obligations, however February 2011 saw renewed fears being expressed that the company was about to delist from the AIM. Subsequently the Chief Executive Officer resigned on 31 March 2011.

=== React Energy plc ===
At the company's AGM in November 2013 it was decided to change the company's name from Kedco PLC to REACT Energy PLC to reflect the company's changed business focus. The share price of the company has remained volatile since renaming and trading in the company's shares was briefly suspended in December 2014 amid concerns about the future viability of the company.

In 2016, Farmer Business Development plc invested in REACT to keep the project afloat.

=== EQTEC ===
In February 2017, the company was once again renamed, this time to EQTEC PLC.

== Kedco ==
Kedco operated 2 distinct divisions targeting both Residential and Industrial client bases.

The Power division specialises in power generation from sustainable fuel sources with Kedco providing bio-science solutions to industrial clients by converting waste into an energy resource.

The Energy division supplied renewable energy heating products within Ireland, primarily to residential customers. Kedco registered with the Sustainable Energy Authority of Ireland as Wood Pellet Ireland.

Both divisions remained in operation for a period of time, however the company stated in a press release in late 2008 that "Kedco Power constitutes the main part of the company going forward". The company subsequently decided to cease supplying products to the domestic market and since 2012 it has focused exclusively on industrial energy solutions.

== See also ==
- Bioethanol
- Anaerobic digestion
- Wood pellets
