= 1994 Dudley West by-election =

UK House of Commons election

- 15 December 1994

Dudley West constituency
- Turnout: 47.0% (▼35.1 pp)
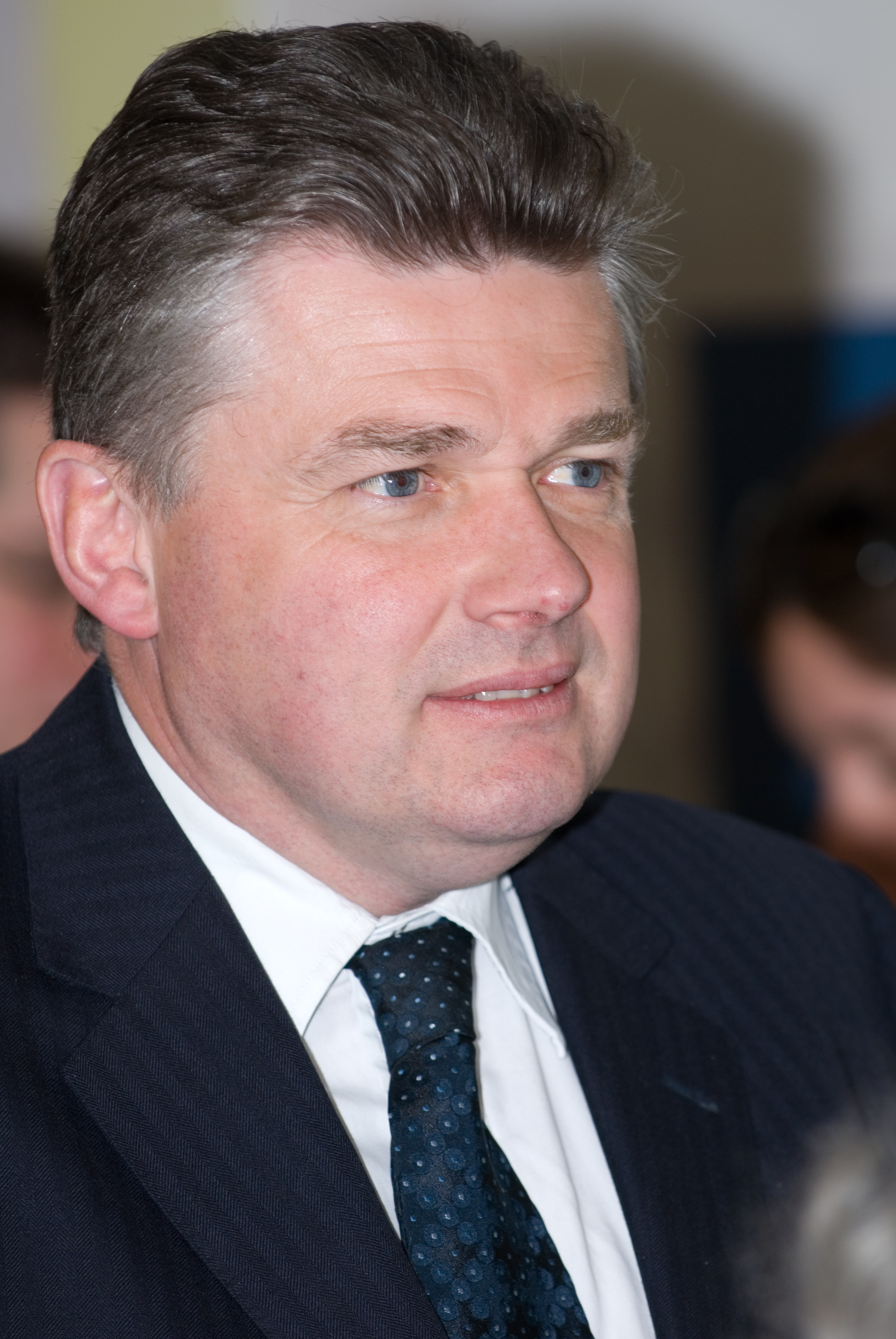
	First party	Second party	Third party
		Con	Lib
Candidate	Ian Pearson	Graham Postles	Mike Hadley
Party	Labour	Conservative	Liberal Democrats
Popular vote	28,400	7,706	3,154
Percentage	68.8%	18.7%	7.6%
Swing	▲28.0 pp	▼30.2 pp	▼2.8 pp
MP before election
John Blackburn
Conservative
Subsequent MP
Ian Pearson
Labour

A by-election was held for the UK House of Commons constituency of Dudley West on 15 December 1994 following the death of the sitting Conservative Member of Parliament (MP) John Blackburn.

The result was a Labour gain from the Conservatives, on one of the largest swings since the Second World War. This was the first significant sign of the changed political climate following the election of Tony Blair as Labour leader, which would eventually lead to Labour's landslide victory in the 1997 general election. Labour gained nearly 70% of the votes, whereas the Conservative candidate attracted fewer than 20% of the votes.

== Result ==
Dudley West by-election, 1994
Party	Candidate	Votes	%	±%
Labour	Ian Pearson	28,400	68.8	+28.0
Conservative	Graham Postles	7,706	18.7	−30.2
Liberal Democrats	Mike Hadley	3,154	7.6	−2.8
UKIP	Malcolm Floyd	590	1.4	New
National Front	Andy Carmichael	561	1.4	New
Liberal	Mike Hyde	548	1.3	New
New Britain	Mike Nattrass	146	0.3	New
FOREST - Freedom of Choice for Smokers	Marjorie Nicholson	77	0.2	New
Natural Law	John Oldbury	70	0.2	New
21st Century Conservatives Party	Colin Palmer	55	0.1	New
Majority		20,694	50.1	N/A
Turnout		41,307	47.0	−35.1
Labour gain from Conservative		Swing	+29.1	

== Previous result ==
General election 1992: Dudley West
Party	Candidate	Votes	%	±%
Conservative	John Blackburn	34,729	48.8	−1.0
Labour	KJ Lomax	28,940	40.7	+6.7
Liberal Democrats	GPT Lewis	7,446	10.5	−5.7
Majority		5,789	8.1	−7.7
Turnout		71,115	82.1	+3.0
Conservative hold		Swing	−3.8	

== See also ==
- Lists of United Kingdom by-elections
