= 1834 Dudley by-election =

UK parliamentary by-election

- 27 February 1834

Constituency of Dudley
- Registered: 670
- Turnout: 81.6%
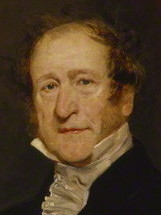
	First party	Second party
	Con
Candidate	Thomas Hawkes	Sir John Campbell
Party	Conservative	Whig
Popular vote	322	254
Percentage	55.9%	44.1%
MP before election
Sir John Campbell
Whig
Elected MP
Thomas Hawkes
Conservative

The 1834 Dudley by-election was fought on 27 February 1834 after the sitting MP, Sir John Campbell, was appointed as Attorney General, triggering a by-election. Campbell's opponent was Thomas Hawkes, a local industrialist who owned a glass factory. The two men had previously contested the constituency of Stafford in 1830 and 1831.

The writ for the election arrived at Dudley on Sunday, 23 February and on the following day, the Returning Officer, Mr. Jenkins, announced that nominations would take place on Thursday 27 February. On the Monday and Wednesday before the election, disorder broke out in the town, with injuries inflicted and windows broken. At the hustings on election day, the candidacy of Campbell was proposed by Mr J. Twamley and seconded by James Foster. Hawkes was proposed and seconded respectively by Mr C. Cartwight and Mr. W. Fellows. After election addresses, the Returning Officer asked for a show of hands in support of the rival candidates and Campbell was adjudged to have won this. The Hawkes' camp then requested a poll and at about 3pm voting ended and the result revealed that Thomas Hawkes had won the Dudley seat with a majority of 68. The result provoked considerable further disorder in the town resulting in a request for the military to intervene. Two troops of the 3rd Dragoon Guards arrived from Birmingham to clear the streets of rioters.

By-election, 27 February 1834: Dudley
Party	Candidate	Votes	%	±%
Conservative	Thomas Hawkes (MP)	322	55.9	+14.0
Whig	Sir John Campbell	254	44.1	−14.0
Majority		68	11.8	N/A
Turnout		576	80.6	−1.0
Registered electors		715		
Conservative gain from Whig		Swing	+14.0	
