= Alfred Paget (disambiguation) =

Alfred Paget was an actor.

Alfred Paget may also refer to:

- Lord Alfred Paget (1816–1888), British soldier and courtier
- Alfred Paget (Royal Navy officer) (1852–1918), British admiral

== See also ==
- Alfred Paget Hedges, MP for Tunbridge
