= 1921 Dudley by-election =

UK Parliamentary by-election

← 1918	3 March 1921	1922 →
Candidate	Wilson	Griffith-Boscawen
Party	Labour	Unionist
Popular vote	10,244	9,968
Percentage	50.7%	49.3%
MP before election
Griffith-Boscawen
Unionist
Subsequent MP
Lloyd
Unionist

The 1921 Dudley by-election was held on 3 March 1921. The by-election was held due to the appointment of the incumbent Coalition Conservative MP, Arthur Griffith-Boscawen, as Minister of Agriculture and Fisheries. It was won by the Labour candidate James Wilson. It was one of only eight ministerial by-elections in the UK to not be retained by the incumbent.

Dudley by-election, 1921
Party		Candidate	Votes	%	±%
	Labour	James Wilson	10,244	50.7	+10.9
C	Unionist	Arthur Griffith-Boscawen	9,968	49.3	−10.9
Majority			276	1.4	N/A
Turnout			20,212	79.9	+19.5
	Labour gain from Unionist		Swing	+10.9	
C indicates candidate endorsed by the coalition government.
