= Sonia Kumar =

British politician

Sonia Kumar MP
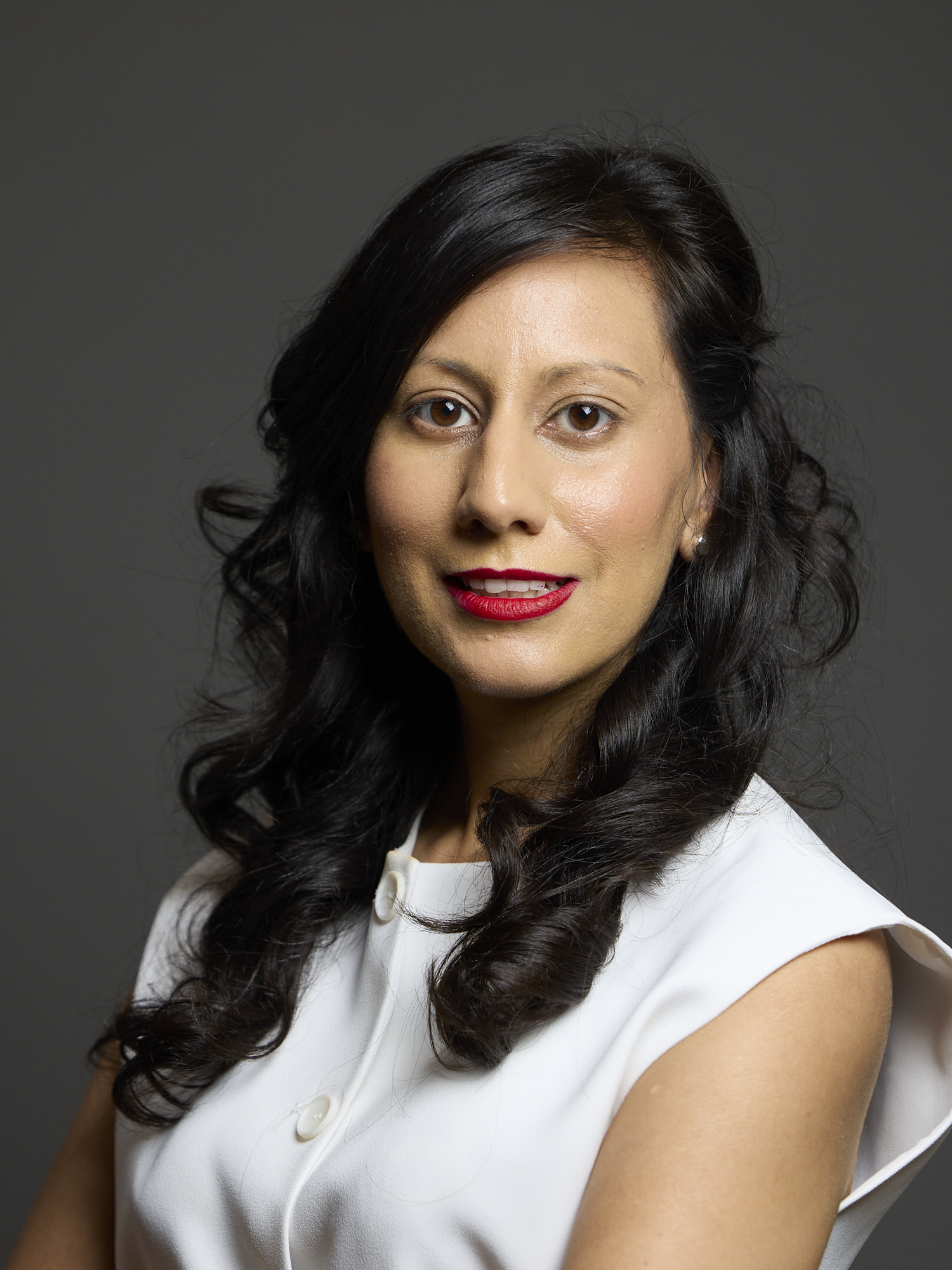
- Official portrait, 2024

Member of Parliament for Dudley
- Incumbent
- Assumed office 4 July 2024
- Preceded by: Marco Longhi
- Majority: 1,900 (5.3%)

Personal details
- Party: Labour
- Education: Aston University

Sonia Kumar is a British Labour Party politician who has served as the Member of Parliament (MP) for Dudley since 2024. Previously she worked as a physiotherapist.

== Early life ==
Kumar grew up in the West Midlands in a family that operated a greengrocery business. She has described herself as a "true West Midlands woman" and has spoken about the influence of her family business on her views about small and medium-sized businesses.

Kumar was educated at Cadbury College in Birmingham. She was an NHS physiotherapist and worked at the Royal Orthopaedic Hospital before becoming an MP.

== Parliamentary career ==
In the 2024 general election, Kumar's opponent Marco Longhi, the Conservative MP for Dudley, was accused of "dog-whistle" tactics against Kumar. His campaign sent leaflets to British Pakistani and Kashmiri Muslims drawing attention to Kumar's Hindu surname (writing it in capital letters and underlined), arguing that she would not support Kashmir while in Parliament. She was later elected MP for Dudley with 12,215 votes (34%). She said that trust played a crucial role in her victory. She is the first MP for the newly-formed constituency. Kumar graduated from Aston University with a masters degree in business and management, two weeks after the election.

In June 2025 she chaired a backbench business committee debate to highlight pelvic issues. In March 2026 Sonia was appointed Cabinet Parliamentary Private Secretary to Darren Jones, Chancellor of the Duchy of Lancaster and Chief Secretary to the Prime Minister.
