= Tunbridge (constituency) =

Parliamentary constituency in Kent

- Former county constituency for the House of Commons

1885–1918
- Seats: one
- Created from: Mid Kent
- Replaced by: Tonbridge

Tunbridge was a parliamentary constituency in Kent, centred on the town of Tonbridge. It returned one Member of Parliament (MP) to the House of Commons of the Parliament of the United Kingdom.

It was created for the 1885 general election, and abolished for the 1918 general election, when it was replaced by the new Tonbridge constituency.

== Boundaries ==
The Sessional Divisions of Tunbridge and Tunbridge Wells, and part of the Sessional Division of Malling.

== Members of Parliament ==
| Election | Member | Party |
|---|---|---|
| 1885 | Robert Norton | Conservative |
| 1892 | Arthur Griffith-Boscawen | Conservative |
| 1906 | Alfred Paget Hedges | Liberal |
| 1910 | Herbert Spender-Clay | Conservative |
| 1918 | constituency abolished: see Tonbridge | |

== Elections ==
=== Elections in the 1880s ===
Verney

General election 1885: Tunbridge
| Party | Candidate | Votes | % | ±% |
|---|---|---|---|---|
| Conservative | Robert Norton | 4,533 | 51.8 | |
| Liberal | Frederick Verney | 4,210 | 48.2 | |
| Majority | | 323 | 3.6 | |
| Turnout | | 8,743 | 81.7 | |
| Registered electors | | 10,703 | | |
| Conservative win (new seat) | | | | |

General election 1886: Tunbridge
| Party | Candidate | Votes | % | ±% |
|---|---|---|---|---|
| Conservative | Robert Norton | Unopposed | | |
| Conservative hold | | | | |

=== Elections in the 1890s ===
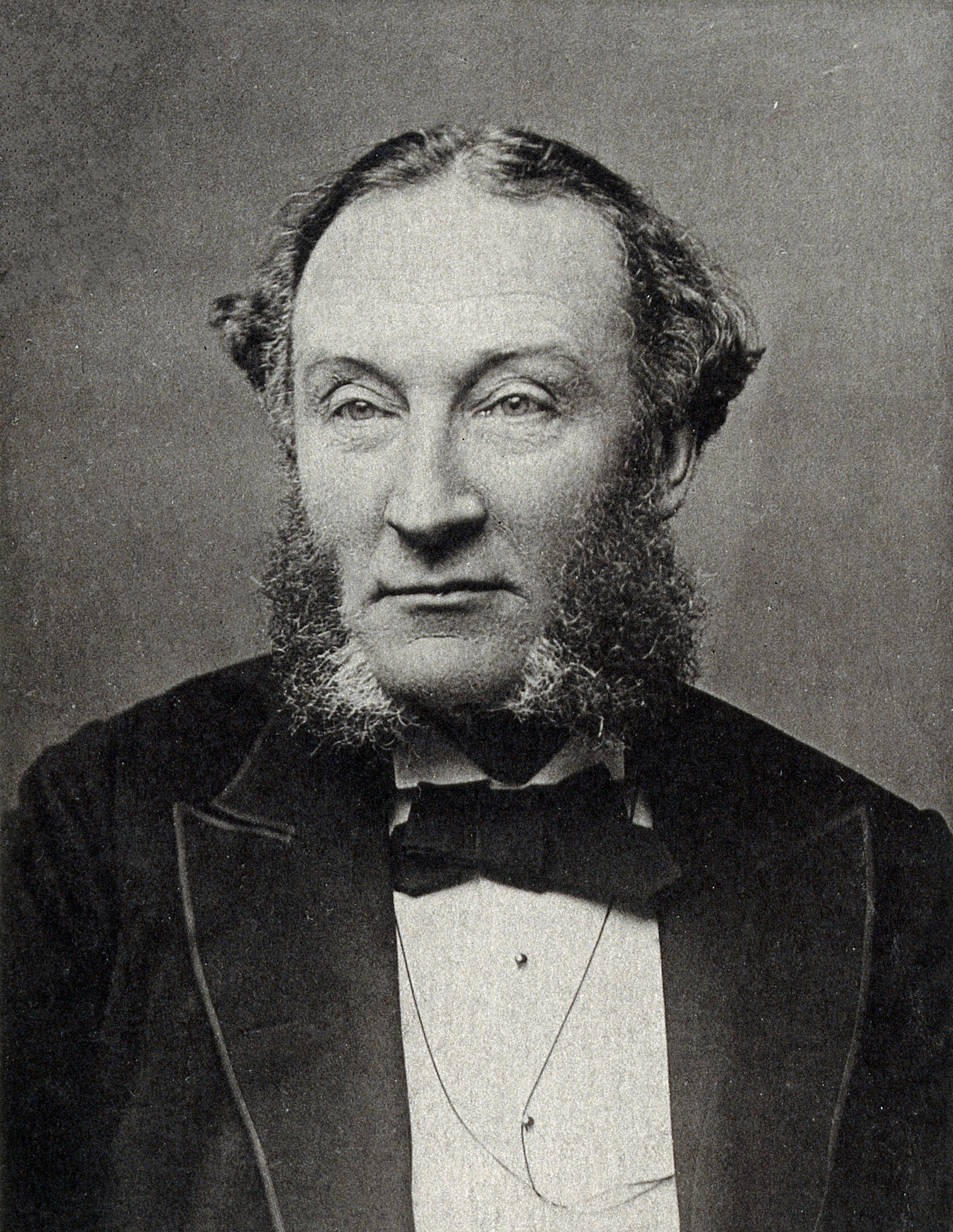
Frederick Pavy

General election 1892: Tunbridge
| Party | Candidate | Votes | % | ±% |
|---|---|---|---|---|
| Conservative | Arthur Griffith-Boscawen | 4,821 | 55.4 | N/A |
| Liberal | Frederick William Pavy | 3,888 | 44.6 | New |
| Majority | | 933 | 10.8 | N/A |
| Turnout | | 8,709 | 69.7 | N/A |
| Registered electors | | 12,494 | | |
| Conservative hold | | Swing | N/A | |

General election 1895: Tunbridge
| Party | Candidate | Votes | % | ±% |
|---|---|---|---|---|
| Conservative | Arthur Griffith-Boscawen | Unopposed | | |
| Conservative hold | | | | |

=== Elections in the 1900s ===
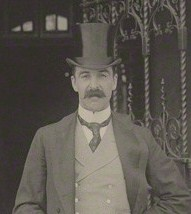
Griffith-Boscawen

General election 1900: Tunbridge
| Party | Candidate | Votes | % | ±% |
|---|---|---|---|---|
| Conservative | Arthur Griffith-Boscawen | 5,576 | 61.5 | N/A |
| Liberal | C Cory | 3,494 | 38.5 | New |
| Majority | | 2,082 | 23.0 | N/A |
| Turnout | | 9,070 | 67.1 | N/A |
| Registered electors | | 13,519 | | |
| Conservative hold | | Swing | N/A | |

Alfred Hedges

General election 1906: Tunbridge
| Party | Candidate | Votes | % | ±% |
|---|---|---|---|---|
| Liberal | Alfred Paget Hedges | 7,170 | 54.9 | +16.4 |
| Conservative | Arthur Griffith-Boscawen | 5,887 | 45.1 | −16.4 |
| Majority | | 1,283 | 9.8 | N/A |
| Turnout | | 13,057 | 84.2 | +17.1 |
| Registered electors | | 15,500 | | |
| Liberal gain from Conservative | | Swing | +16.4 | |

=== Elections in the 1910s ===
General election January 1910: Tunbridge
| Party | Candidate | Votes | % | ±% |
|---|---|---|---|---|
| Conservative | Herbert Spender-Clay | 9,240 | 60.5 | +15.4 |
| Liberal | Alfred Paget Hedges | 6,030 | 39.5 | −15.4 |
| Majority | | 3,210 | 21.0 | N/A |
| Turnout | | 15,270 | 89.2 | +5.0 |
| Conservative gain from Liberal | | Swing | +15.4 | |

General election December 1910: Tunbridge
| Party | Candidate | Votes | % | ±% |
|---|---|---|---|---|
| Conservative | Herbert Spender-Clay | 8,286 | 57.4 | −3.1 |
| Liberal | Alfred Paget Hedges | 6,159 | 42.6 | +3.1 |
| Majority | | 2,127 | 14.8 | −6.2 |
| Turnout | | 14,445 | 84.4 | −4.8 |
| Conservative hold | | Swing | | |

General Election 1914–15:

Another General Election was required to take place before the end of 1915. The political parties had been making preparations for an election to take place and by July 1914, the following candidates had been selected;

- Unionist: Herbert Spender-Clay
- Liberal:
