= John Benbow (MP) =

John Benbow (1768–24 February 1855) was a Conservative politician who represented Dudley in the UK Parliament in the nineteenth century. He won his seat in 1844 and served until his death in 1855.

== Biography ==
John Benbow was born in 1768. In 1805 it was recorded that he was a solicitor practising at Lincoln's Inn, London. In 1833, Benbow was appointed as joint executor and trustee of the estates of the late John Ward, 1st Earl of Dudley. The estates included Himley Hall and the ruins of Dudley Castle as well as land and industries in the Dudley area. When Lord Ward came into his inheritance in 1845, Benbow was appointed sole manager and auditor.

== In politics ==
In 1837, Benbow stood unsuccessfully as member of parliament for Wolverhampton. Subsequently, when the sitting MP for Dudley, Thomas Hawkes resigned his seat in 1844, John Benbow, then a solicitor with the London firm, Messrs Benbow and Tucker, stood and won the election as a Conservative candidate. The defeated candidate was the anti-corn law candidate, William Rawson. Benbow was subsequently re-elected in 1847 (unopposed) and 1852. According to Hansard, he never spoke in Parliament during the time he was MP for Dudley.

Local chronicler C. F. G. Clarke wrote:

Mr. Benbow was a decided Tory in politics, and a churchman in religion; his school of thought was narrow and contracted, and he looked upon all reforms and progressions with alarm and distrust.

and

[...] he secured and maintained his seat as M.P. for Dudley entirely on the sufferance of the Castle power and influence.

== Death ==
John Benbow died on 24 February 1855, at Hastings, whilst still MP for Dudley, triggering a by-election that was won by Sir Stafford Northcote.

== Family ==
Benbow married Elizabeth, the daughter of Charles Bradley, and together they had two sons and three daughters. Elizabeth died in 1825.

Parliament of the United Kingdom
Preceded by Thomas Hawkes	Member of Parliament for Dudley; 1844–1855	Succeeded by Sir Stafford Northcote
