= Dudley (constituency) =

UK Parliament constituency (1832–1974, 2024 onwards)

Coordinates: 52.52°N 2.11°W

- Borough constituency for the House of Commons
- Interactive map of boundaries from 2024
- Boundary of Dudley in West Midlands region
- County: West Midlands
- Electorate: 71,083 (2023)
- Major settlements: Dudley, Sedgley, Dixon's Green

Current constituency
- Created: 2024
- Member of Parliament: Sonia Kumar (Labour)
- Seats: One
- Created from: Dudley North; Dudley South (minor part)

1832–1974
- Seats: One
- Created from: Worcestershire
- Replaced by: Dudley East; Dudley West

Dudley is a constituency centred on the town of Dudley in the West Midlands, represented in the House of Commons of the UK Parliament since 2024 by Sonia Kumar, a member of the Labour Party. (Note: As with all constituencies, the constituency elects one Member of Parliament (MP) by the first past the post system of election at least every five years.) It returns one Member of Parliament (MP) to the House of Commons of the Parliament of the United Kingdom, elected by the first past the post system.

The constituency existed between 1832 and 1974 and was re-established by the 2023 Periodic Review of Westminster constituencies for the 2024 general election, It is based on the abolished Dudley North, with the addition of one ward from the also abolished Dudley South constituency.

== Constituency profile ==
Dudley is an urban and suburban constituency centred on the town of Dudley, part of the Black Country area of the West Midlands. Neighbourhoods outside the town centre covered by the constituency include Brockmoor, Pensnett, Gornal and Sedgley. Dudley grew rapidly during the Industrial Revolution as a centre for ironworking and coal mining. The constituency has high levels of deprivation, with Dudley town centre and the suburbs to its south-west falling within the 10% most-deprived areas in England, whilst Gornal and Sedgley are comparatively wealthier. House prices in the constituency are generally low.

Compared to the rest of the country, residents of the constituency have low levels of education, income and professional employment. White people made up 80% of the population at the 2021 census, with Asians (primarily Pakistanis) forming the largest ethnic minority group at 11%. At the local council, most of the constituency is represented by the Labour Party, although Conservatives were elected in the wealthier outer suburbs. Voters in the constituency overwhelmingly supported leaving the European Union in the 2016 referendum; an estimated 71% voted in favour of Brexit, the 11th-highest rate out of 650 constituencies nationwide according to Electoral Calculus.

== Boundaries ==
1918–1950: The County Borough of Dudley, and the parish of Dudley Castle Hill.

1950–1974: The County Borough of Dudley, and the Borough of Stourbridge.

2024–present: The Metropolitan Borough of Dudley wards of Brockmoor and Pensnett, Castle and Priory, Gornal, St James's, St Thomas's, Sedgley, and Upper Gornal and Woodsetton (as they existed on 1 December 2020).

The re-established seat comprises the whole of the previous Dudley North constituency with the addition of the Brockmoor and Pensnett ward from Dudley South (abolished), thus bringing the electorate within the permitted range.

== History ==
The borough of Dudley returned two members to Parliament in 1295, Benedict Andrew and Ralph Clerk de Duddlegh, but not to any subsequent one.

The constituency was created by the Reform Act 1832 for the 1832 general election. It was abolished for the February 1974 general election, when it was replaced by the new Dudley East and Dudley West constituencies, which expanded beyond the town's historic boundaries to include Coseley and part of Sedgley in Dudley East (previously in the old Bilston constituency), as well as Kingswinford, Brierley Hill, and the remainder of Sedgley in Dudley West. All of these areas had been incorporated into the Dudley borough in 1966.

In the 2023 Periodic Review of Westminster constituencies, it was recommended that Dudley should return as a constituency, replacing Dudley North.

== Members of Parliament ==
=== MPs 1832–1974 ===
Election	Member	Party
1832	Sir John Campbell	Whig
Feb. 1834	Thomas Hawkes	Tory
Dec. 1834	Thomas Hawkes	Conservative
1844	John Benbow	Conservative
1855	Sir Stafford Northcote	Conservative
1857	Henry Brinsley Sheridan	Independent
1859	Henry Brinsley Sheridan	Liberal
1886	Brooke Robinson	Conservative
1906	Arthur George Hooper	Liberal
1910	Sir Arthur Griffith-Boscawen	Conservative
1921	James Wilson	Labour
1922	Cyril Lloyd	Unionist
1929	Oliver Baldwin	Labour
1931	Dudley Joel	Conservative
1941	Cyril Lloyd	Conservative
1945	George Wigg	Labour
1968	Donald Williams	Conservative
1970	John Gilbert	Labour
Feb 1974	Constituency abolished	

=== MPs since 2024 ===
Dudley North prior to 2024

Election	Member	Party
2024	Sonia Kumar	Labour

== Elections ==
=== Elections in the 2020s ===
General election 2024: Dudley
Party	Candidate	Votes	%	±%
Labour	Sonia Kumar	12,215	34.1	+3.2
Conservative	Marco Longhi	10,315	28.8	−34.3
Reform UK	Andrew Southall	9,442	26.4	N/A
Green	Zia Qari	1,154	3.2	+1.1
Liberal Democrats	Ian Flynn	1,056	3.0	−0.8
Independent	Shakeela Bibi	857	2.4	N/A
Workers Party	Aftab Hussain	621	1.7	N/A
Independent	Dharmanand Mortha	136	0.4	N/A
Majority		1,900	5.3	N/A
Turnout		35,796	51.0	N/A
Registered electors		70,151		
Labour win (new seat)				

- This is a new seat. Marco Longhi (Conservative) was the incumbent MP for Dudley North before the seat's abolition as part of the 2023 boundary review.

=== Elections in the 1970s ===
General election 1970: Dudley
Party	Candidate	Votes	%	±%
Labour	John Gilbert	29,499	50.29	
Conservative	Donald Williams	29,163	49.71	
Majority		336	0.58	
Turnout		58,662	71.92	
Labour hold		Swing		

=== Elections in the 1960s ===
General election 1964: Dudley
Party	Candidate	Votes	%	±%
Labour	George Wigg	30,250	53.20	
Conservative	David Howell	19,980	35.02	
Liberal	Robert CS Fowler	6,829	11.97	New
Majority		10,270	18.18	
Turnout		56,879	76.53	
Labour hold		Swing		

General election 1966: Dudley
Party	Candidate	Votes	%	±%
Labour	George Wigg	32,693	59.1	+5.9
Conservative	Donald Williams	22,671	40.9	+5.9
Majority		10,022	18.2	0.0
Turnout		55,364	73.9	−2.6
Labour hold		Swing		

1968 Dudley by-election
Party	Candidate	Votes	%	±%
Conservative	Donald Williams	28,016	58.1	+17.2
Labour	John Gilbert	16,360	34.0	−25.1
Liberal	Derek Bird	3,809	7.9	New
Majority		11,656	24.1	N/A
Turnout		48,185	63.5	−10.4
Conservative gain from Labour		Swing	+21.2	

=== Elections in the 1950s ===
General election 1950: Dudley
Party	Candidate	Votes	%	±%
Labour	George Wigg	32,856	54.62	
Conservative	Roy Farran	19,825	32.96	
Liberal	Bertram Samuel White	7,470	12.42	New
Majority		13,031	21.66	
Turnout		60,151	86.83	
Labour hold		Swing		

General election 1951: Dudley
Party	Candidate	Votes	%	±%
Labour	George Wigg	34,376	58.36	
Conservative	Harold Soref	24,525	41.64	
Majority		9,851	16.72	
Turnout		58,901	83.65	
Labour hold		Swing		

General election 1955: Dudley
Party	Candidate	Votes	%	±%
Labour	George Wigg	31,384	54.87	
Conservative	Sir Thomas Douglas Wilson, 4th Baronet	20,333	35.55	
Liberal	Wallace Lawler	5,479	9.58	New
Majority		11,051	19.32	
Turnout		57,196	79.83	
Labour hold		Swing		

General election 1959: Dudley
Party	Candidate	Votes	%	±%
Labour	George Wigg	31,826	54.94	
Conservative	Frank E. Spiller	26,101	45.06	
Majority		5,725	9.88	
Turnout		57,927	79.54	
Labour hold		Swing		

=== Elections in the 1940s ===
General Election 1939–40

Another General Election was required to take place before the end of 1940. The political parties had been making preparations for an election to take place and by the Autumn of 1939, the following candidates had been selected;

- Conservative: Dudley Joel
- Labour: Leonard Freedman

1941 Dudley by-election
Party	Candidate	Votes	%	±%
Conservative	Cyril Lloyd	6,234	56.1	+1.3
Independent	Noel Pemberton Billing	4,869	43.9	New
Majority		1,365	12.2	+2.6
Turnout		11,103	34.7	−40.6
Conservative hold		Swing	N/A	

General election 1945: Dudley
Party	Candidate	Votes	%	±%
Labour	George Wigg	15,439	62.77	
Conservative	Tatton Brinton	9,156	37.23	
Majority		6,283	25.54	N/A
Turnout		24,595	73.81	
Labour gain from Conservative		Swing		

=== Elections in the 1930s ===
General election 1931: Dudley
Party	Candidate	Votes	%	±%
Conservative	Dudley Joel	16,009	56.94	
Labour	W Hodgkiss	12,105	43.06	
Majority		3,904	13.88	N/A
Turnout		28,114	80.75	
Conservative gain from Labour		Swing		

General election 1935: Dudley
Party	Candidate	Votes	%	±%
Conservative	Dudley Joel	13,958	54.81	
Labour	William Wedgwood Benn	11,509	45.19	
Majority		2,449	9.62	
Turnout		25,467	75.29	
Conservative hold		Swing		

=== Elections in the 1920s ===
1921 Dudley by-election
Party		Candidate	Votes	%	±%
	Labour	James Wilson	10,244	50.7	+10.9
C	Unionist	Arthur Griffith-Boscawen	9,968	49.3	−10.9
Majority			276	1.4	N/A
Turnout			20,212	79.9	+19.5
Registered electors			25,305		
	Labour gain from Unionist		Swing	+10.9	
C indicates candidate endorsed by the coalition government.

General election 1922: Dudley
Party	Candidate	Votes	%	±%
Unionist	Cyril Lloyd	12,876	60.2	0.0
Labour	James Wilson	8,522	39.8	0.0
Majority		4,354	20.4	0.0
Turnout		21,398	82.5	+22.1
Registered electors		25,923		
Unionist hold		Swing	0.0	

General election 1923: Dudley
Party	Candidate	Votes	%	±%
Unionist	Cyril Lloyd	10,227	49.4	−10.8
Liberal	Francis James Ballard	8,510	41.1	New
Labour	Richard Fowler Smith	1,958	9.5	−30.3
Majority		1,717	8.3	−12.1
Turnout		20,696	78.9	−3.6
Registered electors		26,257		
Unionist hold		Swing	+9.8	

General election 1924: Dudley
Party	Candidate	Votes	%	±%
Unionist	Cyril Lloyd	11,199	52.1	+2.7
Labour	Oliver Baldwin	10,314	47.9	+38.4
Majority		885	4.2	−4.1
Turnout		21,513	80.2	+1.3
Registered electors		26,826		
Unionist hold		Swing	−17.9	

General election 1929: Dudley
Party	Candidate	Votes	%	±%
Labour	Oliver Baldwin	13,551	47.6	−0.3
Unionist	Cyril Lloyd	10,508	36.9	−15.2
Liberal	Thomas Illingworth Clough	4,399	15.5	New
Majority		3,043	10.7	N/A
Turnout		28,458	81.6	+1.4
Registered electors		34,883		
Labour gain from Unionist		Swing	+7.6	

=== Elections in the 1910s ===
General election January 1910: Dudley
Party	Candidate	Votes	%	±%
Liberal	Arthur George Hooper	8,342	50.6	−1.8
Conservative	Arthur Griffith-Boscawen	8,155	49.4	+1.8
Majority		187	1.2	−3.6
Turnout		16,497	94.4	+4.2
Liberal hold		Swing		

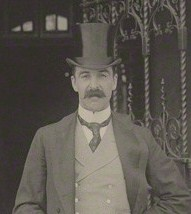
Griffith-Boscawen

General election December 1910: Dudley
Party	Candidate	Votes	%	±%
Conservative	Arthur Griffith-Boscawen	8,260	51.1	+1.7
Liberal	Arthur George Hooper	7,900	48.9	−1.7
Majority		360	2.2	N/A
Turnout		16,160	92.4	−2.0
Conservative gain from Liberal		Swing	+1.7	

General Election 1914–15:

Another General Election was required to take place before the end of 1915. The political parties had been making preparations for an election to take place and by July 1914, the following candidates had been selected;

- Unionist: Arthur Griffith-Boscawen
- Liberal: Gilbert Beyfus

General election 1918: Dudley
Party		Candidate	Votes	%	±%
C	Unionist	Arthur Griffith-Boscawen	9,126	60.2	+9.1
	Labour	William Bridgland Steer	6,046	39.8	New
Majority			3,080	20.4	+18.2
Turnout			15,174	60.4	−32.0
Registered electors			25,103		
	Unionist hold		Swing	+9.1	
C indicates candidate endorsed by the coalition government.

=== Elections in the 1900s ===
Belcher

General election 1900: Dudley
Party	Candidate	Votes	%	±%
Conservative	Brooke Robinson	6,461	52.4	−0.6
Lib-Lab	William Belcher	5,876	47.6	+0.6
Majority		585	4.8	−1.2
Turnout		12,337	77.8	−5.3
Registered electors		15,859		
Conservative hold		Swing	−0.6	

A.G. Hooper

General election 1906: Dudley
Party	Candidate	Votes	%	±%
Liberal	Arthur George Hooper	8,296	52.4	+4.8
Conservative	Gilbert Claughton	7,542	47.6	−4.8
Majority		754	4.8	N/A
Turnout		15,838	90.2	+12.4
Registered electors		17,564		
Liberal gain from Conservative		Swing	+4.8	

=== Elections in the 1890s ===
General election 1892: Dudley
Party	Candidate	Votes	%	±%
Conservative	Brooke Robinson	6,668	54.3	−4.5
Liberal	Howard Spensley	5,619	45.7	+4.5
Majority		1,049	8.6	−9.0
Turnout		12,287	80.3	+6.4
Registered electors		15,303		
Conservative hold		Swing	−4.5	

General election 1895: Dudley
Party	Candidate	Votes	%	±%
Conservative	Brooke Robinson	6,536	53.0	−1.3
Liberal	Charles James Fleming	5,795	47.0	+1.3
Majority		741	6.0	−2.6
Turnout		12,331	83.1	+2.8
Registered electors		14,831		
Conservative hold		Swing	-1.3	

=== Elections in the 1880s ===
General election 1880: Dudley
Party	Candidate	Votes	%	±%
Liberal	Henry Brinsley Sheridan	6,948	62.5	+7.3
Conservative	Alfred Waterman	4,163	37.5	−7.3
Majority		2,785	25.0	+14.6
Turnout		11,111	74.1	+10.2
Registered electors		15,000		
Liberal hold		Swing	+7.3	

General election 1885: Dudley
Party	Candidate	Votes	%	±%
Liberal	Henry Brinsley Sheridan	6,377	55.0	−7.5
Conservative	Brooke Robinson	5,211	45.0	+7.5
Majority		1,166	10.0	−15.0
Turnout		11,588	77.7	+3.6
Registered electors		14,918		
Liberal hold		Swing	−7.5	

General election 1886: Dudley
Party	Candidate	Votes	%	±%
Conservative	Brooke Robinson	6,475	58.8	+13.8
Liberal	Henry Brinsley Sheridan	4,545	41.2	−13.8
Majority		1,930	17.6	N/A
Turnout		11,020	73.9	−3.8
Registered electors		14,918		
Conservative gain from Liberal		Swing	+13.8	

=== Elections in the 1870s ===
General election 1874: Dudley
Party	Candidate	Votes	%	±%
Liberal	Henry Brinsley Sheridan	5,149	55.2	N/A
Conservative	Frederick Smith-Shenstone	4,181	44.8	New
Majority		968	10.4	N/A
Turnout		9,330	63.9	N/A
Registered electors		14,593		
Liberal hold		Swing	N/A	

The election was declared void on petition, causing a by-election.

By-election, 21 May 1874: Dudley
Party	Candidate	Votes	%	±%
Liberal	Henry Brinsley Sheridan	5,607	53.4	−1.8
Conservative	Noah Hingley	4,889	46.6	+1.8
Majority		718	6.8	−3.6
Turnout		10,496	71.9	+8.0
Registered electors		14,593		
Liberal hold		Swing	−1.8	

=== Elections in the 1860s ===
General election 1865: Dudley
Party	Candidate	Votes	%	±%
Liberal	Henry Brinsley Sheridan	526	65.7	+11.2
Conservative	Francis Wyatt Truscott	275	34.3	−11.2
Majority		251	31.4	+22.4
Turnout		801	59.0	−20.9
Registered electors		1,358		
Liberal hold		Swing	+11.2	

General election 1868: Dudley
Party	Candidate	Votes	%	±%
Liberal	Henry Brinsley Sheridan	Unopposed		
Registered electors		11,847		
Liberal hold				

=== Elections in the 1850s ===
General election 1852: Dudley
Party	Candidate	Votes	%	±%
Conservative	John Benbow	400	63.4	N/A
Radical	James Baldwin	231	36.6	New
Majority		169	26.8	N/A
Turnout		631	69.2	N/A
Registered electors		912		
Conservative hold		Swing	N/A	

Benbow's death caused a by-election.

By-election, 8 March 1855: Dudley
Party	Candidate	Votes	%	±%
Conservative	Stafford Northcote	346	99.1	+35.7
Radical	James Baldwin	3	0.9	−35.7
Majority		343	98.2	+71.4
Turnout		349	38.5	−30.7
Registered electors		907		
Conservative hold		Swing	+35.7	

General election 1857: Dudley
Party	Candidate	Votes	%	±%
Independent	Henry Brinsley Sheridan	Unopposed		
Registered electors		884		
Independent gain from Conservative				

General election 1859: Dudley
Party	Candidate	Votes	%	±%
Liberal	Henry Brinsley Sheridan	432	54.5	New
Conservative	Charles Monck	361	45.5	New
Majority		71	9.0	N/A
Turnout		793	79.9	N/A
Registered electors		992		
Liberal gain from Independent		Swing	N/A	

=== Elections in the 1840s ===
General election 1841: Dudley
Party	Candidate	Votes	%	±%
Conservative	Thomas Hawkes	436	69.8	+12.7
Whig	William Adams Smith	189	30.2	−12.7
Majority		247	39.6	+25.4
Turnout		625	64.4	−15.5
Registered electors		971		
Conservative hold		Swing	+12.7	

Hawkes resigned by accepting the office of Steward of the Chiltern Hundreds, causing a by-election.

By-election, 8 August 1844: Dudley
Party	Candidate	Votes	%	±%
Conservative	John Benbow	388	68.9	−0.9
Radical	William Rawson	175	31.1	+0.9
Majority		213	37.8	−1.8
Turnout		563	61.8	−2.6
Registered electors		911		
Conservative hold		Swing	−0.9	

General election 1847: Dudley
Party	Candidate	Votes	%	±%
Conservative	John Benbow	Unopposed		
Registered electors		791		
Conservative hold				

=== Elections in the 1830s ===
General election 1832: Dudley
Party	Candidate	Votes	%
Whig	John Campbell	318	58.1
Tory	Horace St Paul	229	41.9
Majority		89	16.2
Turnout		547	81.6
Registered electors		670	
Whig win (new seat)			

Campbell was appointed as Attorney General for England and Wales, requiring a by-election.

By-election, 28 February 1834: Dudley
Party	Candidate	Votes	%	±%
Tory	Thomas Hawkes	322	55.9	+14.0
Whig	John Campbell	254	44.1	−14.0
Majority		68	11.8	N/A
Turnout		576	80.6	−1.0
Registered electors		715		
Tory gain from Whig		Swing	+14.0	

General election 1835: Dudley
Party	Candidate	Votes	%	±%
Conservative	Thomas Hawkes	360	56.3	+14.4
Whig	John Forbes	279	43.7	−14.4
Majority		81	12.6	N/A
Turnout		639	87.9	+6.3
Registered electors		727		
Conservative gain from Whig		Swing	+14.4	

General election 1837: Dudley
Party	Candidate	Votes	%	±%
Conservative	Thomas Hawkes	385	57.1	+0.8
Whig	William Merryweather Turner	289	42.9	−0.8
Majority		96	14.2	+1.6
Turnout		674	79.9	−8.0
Registered electors		844		
Conservative hold		Swing	+0.8	

== See also ==
- List of parliamentary constituencies in Dudley
- List of parliamentary constituencies in West Midlands (region)
