= John Gilbert, Baron Gilbert =

British politician (1927–2013)

The Right Honourable The Lord Gilbert PC
- In the House of Lords three weeks before his death.

Minister of State for Defence Procurement
- In office 1 May 1997 – 17 May 1999
- Prime Minister: Tony Blair
- Preceded by: James Arbuthnot
- Succeeded by: The Baroness Symons of Vernham Dean
Ministerial offices 1974-9
Minister of State for Defence
In office 10 September 1976 – 4 May 1979
Prime Minister	James Callaghan
Preceded by	William Rodgers
Succeeded by	Euan Howard
Minister of State for Transport
In office 12 June 1975 – 10 September 1976
Prime Minister	Harold Wilson; James Callaghan
Preceded by	Fred Mulley
Succeeded by	William Rodgers (Secretary of State)
Financial Secretary to the Treasury
In office 8 March 1974 – 12 June 1975
Prime Minister	Harold Wilson
Preceded by	Terence Higgins
Succeeded by	Robert Sheldon

Member of the House of Lords
- Lord Temporal
- Life peerage 16 May 1997 – 2 June 2013

Member of Parliament for Dudley East Dudley (1970–1974)
- In office 18 June 1970 – 8 April 1997
- Preceded by: Donald Williams
- Succeeded by: Constituency abolished

Personal details
- Born: 5 April 1927
- Died: 2 June 2013 (aged 86)
- Party: Labour
- Education: St John's College, Oxford; New York University

John William Gilbert, Baron Gilbert, PC (5 April 1927 – 2 June 2013) was a British Labour Party politician.

== Early life ==
Gilbert's father was a civil servant. Baron Gilbert was educated at Merchant Taylors' School, Northwood, St John's College, Oxford, where he studied philosophy, politics and economics, and New York University, where he gained a PhD in international economics. He then worked as a chartered accountant in Canada.

== Parliamentary career ==
He contested the Parliamentary seat of Ludlow in 1966 and a by-election in Dudley in 1968 before being elected for Dudley in 1970 and (after boundary changes) Dudley East in 1974, which he represented until 1997, when it became part of the new Dudley North constituency (which was held by a new Labour MP) and Gilbert retired from the House of Commons.

In the Labour governments of Harold Wilson and James Callaghan he was Financial Secretary to the Treasury (1974–1975), Minister for Transport (1975–1976), and Minister of State for Defence (1976–1979). As Minister for Transport he approved the London M25 orbital motorway project and introduced the Bill to make the wearing of seat belts compulsory. He also served on the House of Commons Defence Committee (1979–1987) and the Trade and Industry Committee (1987–1992).

== House of Lords ==
After his retirement from the House of Commons, he was created a Life Peer as Baron Gilbert, of Dudley in the County of West Midlands on 16 May 1997 and from 1997 to 1999 he was the Minister of State for Defence Procurement in Tony Blair's first government. Always a staunch proponent of Britain's independent nuclear deterrent, he caused controversy when he proposed neutron bombing the Afghanistan-Pakistan border to "prevent people from infiltrating from one side to the other." In October 2012 he said in the House of Lords "The A400M [the RAF's new transport aircraft] is a complete, absolute wanking disaster, and we should be ashamed of ourselves. I have never seen such a waste of public funds in the defence field since I have been involved in it these past 40 years."

== Personal life ==
Gilbert was married twice, firstly in 1950, to Hillary, daughter of Lord Strabolgi. They had two daughters, before divorcing in 1954.

Gilbert later married Jean Ross-Skinner in 1963.

He died in 2013 at the age of 86.

Parliament of the United Kingdom
Preceded by Donald Williams	Member of Parliament for Dudley; 1970 – 1974	Constituency abolished
New constituency	Member of Parliament for Dudley East; 1974–1997	Constituency abolished
Political offices
Preceded by Terence Higgins	Financial Secretary to the Treasury; 1974–1975	Succeeded by Robert Sheldon
Preceded by Fred Mulley	Minister of State for Transport; 1975–1976	Succeeded by William Rodgers as Secretary of State for Transport
