= Robert Norton (British politician) =

Robert Norton (11 October 1838 – 7 June 1926) was an English Conservative politician who sat in the House of Commons from 1885 to 1892.

Norton was the son of William Norton of Burcott House, Northamptonshire. He was educated privately and was called to the bar at Middle Temple in 1865. He was a Clerk in the War Office.

Norton was elected Member of Parliament for Tunbridge in 1885. He held the seat until he stood down in 1892

Norton lived at Downs House, Yalding, Maidstone and died at the age of 87

Norton married Amelia Harriet Duncombe Shafto (daughter of John Duncombe Shafto) on 28 Dec 1867 at St. Leonard, St.Leonards-on-Sea, Sussex. She died 26 Jan 1900.

Parliament of the United Kingdom
| Preceded by See; Mid Kent constituency | Member of Parliament for Tunbridge; New constituency 1885 – 1892 | Succeeded by Arthur Griffith-Boscawen |
