= Dudley Joel =

British politician

Member of Parliament for Dudley
- In office 27 October 1931 – 28 May 1941
- Preceded by: The Earl Baldwin of Bewdley
- Succeeded by: Cyril Lloyd

Personal details
- Born: Dudley Jack Barnato Joel; 26 April 1904 London, England
- Died: 28 May 1941 (aged 37) HMS Registan, Atlantic Ocean
- Resting place: Willesden Jewish Cemetery
- Party: Conservative
- Spouse: Esme Oldham (m. 1936)
- Parent(s): Solomon Joel; Ellen Ridle
- Education: King's College, Cambridge
- Military career
- Allegiance: United Kingdom
- Branch: Royal Navy
- Service years: 1939–1941
- Rank: Lieutenant
- Unit: Royal Naval Volunteer Reserve

Dudley Jack Barnato Joel (26 April 1904 – 28 May 1941) was a British businessman and Conservative Party politician.

Part of the wealthy and prominent Joel family, he was the son of businessman Solomon Barnato Joel and his wife Ellen (Nellie) Ridle. He was educated at Repton School and King's College, Cambridge. In 1936 he married Esme Oldham.

Heavily involved in Thoroughbred horse racing, in 1922, his father purchased Moulton Paddocks in Newmarket from the estate of Sir Ernest Cassel. On his father's death in 1931, Dudley Joel inherited the property.

In the 1931 general election, Dudley Joel was elected as the member of parliament (MP) for Dudley. He was re-elected to Parliament in 1935. With the outbreak of the Second World War, he joined the Royal Naval Volunteer Reserve and was killed in action on 28 May 1941 when the steam merchant HMS Registan was bombed by German aircraft off Cape Cornwall.

Joel is buried in the family plot at the Willesden Jewish Cemetery in London.

Parliament of the United Kingdom
Preceded by Oliver Baldwin	Member of Parliament for Dudley; 1931–1941	Succeeded by Cyril Lloyd
