= James Wilson (Labour politician) =

British Labour Party politician (1879–1943)

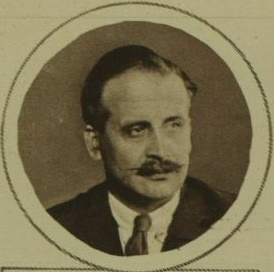
Wilson in 1921

James Wilson (24 August 1879 – 15 August 1943) was a Labour Party politician in the United Kingdom. He was member of parliament (MP) for Dudley from 1921 to 1922, and for Oldham from 1929 to 1931.

Parliament of the United Kingdom
Preceded by Sir Arthur Griffith-Boscawen	Member of Parliament for Dudley; 1921–1922	Succeeded by Cyril Lloyd
Preceded by William Wiggins and Duff Cooper	Member of Parliament for Oldham; 1929–1931; With: Rev. Gordon Lang	Succeeded by Hamilton Kerr and Anthony Crossley
