= Herbert Spender-Clay =

English soldier and Conservative Party politician (1875–1937)

The Right Honourable Herbert Spender-Clay CMG JP DL
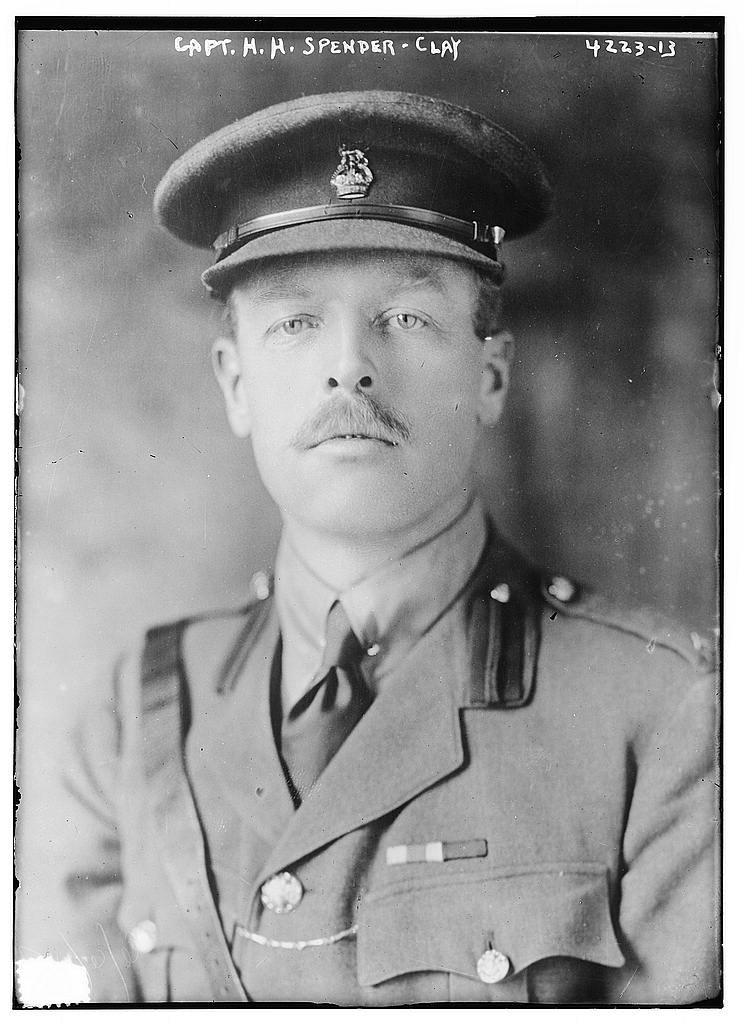
- Spender-Clay in 1917

Member of Parliament
- In office 1910 – 15 February 1937
- Preceded by: Alfred Paget Hedges
- Succeeded by: Adrian Baillie
- Constituency: Tunbridge (1910–1918); Tonbridge (1918–1937)

Personal details
- Born: Herbert Henry Spender-Clay; 4 June 1875
- Died: 15 February 1937 (aged 61) London, England
- Party: Conservative
- Spouse: Pauline Astor (m. 1904)
- Relations: Simon Bowes-Lyon (grandson)
- Children: 3
- Education: Eton College; Royal Military Academy Sandhurst

Herbert Henry Spender-Clay, CMG, PC, JP, DL (4 June 1875 – 15 February 1937), was an English soldier and Conservative Party politician. He sat in the House of Commons from 1910 to 1937.

== Early life ==
Herbert Henry Spender-Clay was born on 4 June 1875, the only son of the former Sydney Garrett and Joseph Spender-Clay, one of the largest shareholders in the Bass Brewing Company. He was a godson of Rev. John Harden Clay, the son of Herbert's great-uncle Rev. John Clay.

Spender-Clay was educated at Eton and Royal Military Academy Sandhurst.

== Career ==
On 10 June 1896 was commissioned as a second lieutenant in the 2nd Life Guards. He was promoted to lieutenant on 20 April 1898, and served in the Second Boer War, during which he was further promoted to captain on 25 September 1901. Following his return from South Africa, he resigned his commission in early September 1902 to take up farming on his father's estate in Surrey, which he inherited. He was appointed a captain in the Reserve of Officers on 24 January 1903.

He was elected at January 1910 general election as the Member of Parliament for the Tunbridge division of Kent. He was re-elected in December 1910, and when the division was abolished in boundary changes for the 1918 general election he was returned as a Coalition Conservative for the new Tonbridge division. He held that seat through a further six general elections until his death.

In April–May 1917 he was a member of the Balfour Mission, intended to promote cooperation between the United States and the UK during World War I. Herbert was Deputy Lieutenant and J.P. for Surrey, and a Charity Commissioner. He was appointed to the Privy Council in 1929, and made CMG.

== Personal life ==
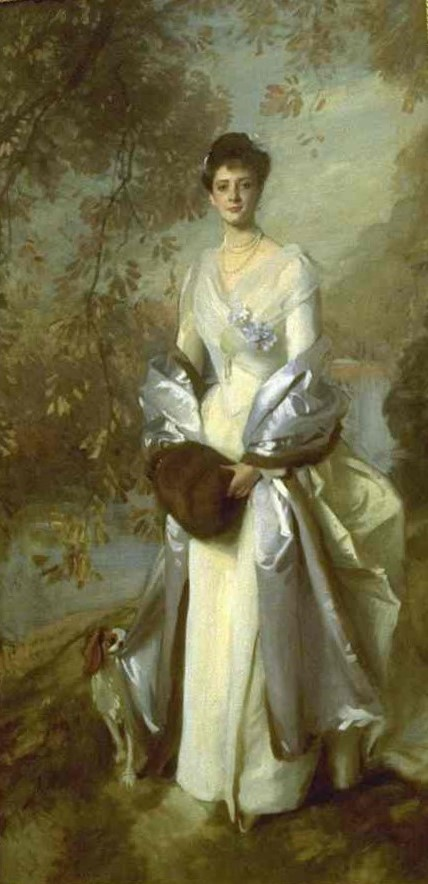
Portrait of his eventual wife, Pauline Astor, by John Singer Sargent, c. 1898

In 1897, when Spender-Clay was just 21 years old, he was tricked into signing promissory notes worth a lot of money by his friend Lord William Beauchamp Nevill. Following two court actions called the Hidden Signature Cases, Spender-Clay was absolved from having to pay for this, and Lord William was convicted of fraud and imprisoned. On 29 October 1904, at the age of 29, Spender-Clay married Pauline Astor, who was then 24, at St Margaret's Church, Westminster with Claude de Crespigny as his best man. She was the elder daughter of William Waldorf Astor, 1st Viscount Astor and Mary Dahlgren Paul. They lived at Ford Manor, Lingfield, Surrey and also had a London house at 21 Hill Street. Herbert and Pauline had three daughters:

- Phyllis Mary Spender-Clay (1905–1972), who married Sir Philip Bouverie Bowyer Nichols, a younger son of Bowyer Nichols of Lawford Hall, in 1932.
- Rachel Pauline Spender-Clay (1907–1996), who married the Hon. Sir David Bowes-Lyon, the youngest son of the 14th Earl of Strathmore, and brother of the Queen Mother, at St James Piccadilly in 1929.
- Sybil Gwendoline Spender-Clay (1910–1912), who died young.

He died on 15 February 1937 aged 61 at his London home at 2 Hyde Park Street, from pneumonia following influenza, and was buried at Dormansland, Surrey.

=== Descendants ===
Through his eldest daughter, he was a grandfather of two grandsons and two granddaughters.

Through his second daughter, he was a grandfather of two: Davina Katherine Bowes-Lyon (1930–2017), who married John Dalrymple, 13th Earl of Stair, and Simon Alexander Bowes-Lyon (b. 1932), who married Caroline Mary Victoria Pike.

Parliament of the United Kingdom
Preceded by Alfred Paget Hedges	Member of Parliament for Tunbridge; January 1910 – 1918	Constituency abolished
New constituency	Member of Parliament for Tonbridge; 1918–1937	Succeeded by Sir Adrian Baillie
