= 1968 Dudley by-election =

UK parliamentary by-election

The 1968 Dudley by-election was a by-election held for the British House of Commons constituency of Dudley in Worcestershire on 28 March 1968. It was won by the Conservative Party candidate Donald Williams.

== Vacancy ==
The seat had become vacant when the Labour Member of Parliament (MP), George Wigg had been appointed Chairman of the Horserace Betting Levy Board on 16 November 1967. He had held the seat since the 1945 general election and had served as Paymaster General in the Government of Harold Wilson. He was also elevated to the House of Lords as Baron Wigg, of the Borough of Dudley.

== Result ==
The result was a clear victory for Williams in what had been a Labour safe seat. It was one of the three Conservative by-election gains from Labour on the same day, the others being at Acton and Meriden.

Williams held the seat until the 1970 general election, when he lost the seat back to the Labour candidate, John Gilbert.

== Votes ==
Dudley by-election, 1968
Party	Candidate	Votes	%	±%
Conservative	Donald Williams	28,016	58.1	+17.2
Labour	John Gilbert	16,360	34.0	−25.1
Liberal	Derek Bird	3,809	7.9	New
Majority		11,656	24.1	N/A
Turnout		48,185	63.5	−10.4
Conservative gain from Labour		Swing	+21.2	

== Previous election ==
General election 1966: Dudley.
Party	Candidate	Votes	%	±%
Labour	George Wigg	32,693	59.1	+5.9
Conservative	Donald Williams	22,671	40.9	+5.9
Majority		10,022	18.2	0.0
Turnout		55,364	73.9	−2.6
Labour hold		Swing		
