= Arthur Griffith-Boscawen =

British politician (1865–1946)

Lieutenant-Colonel The Right Honourable Sir Arthur Griffith-Boscawen
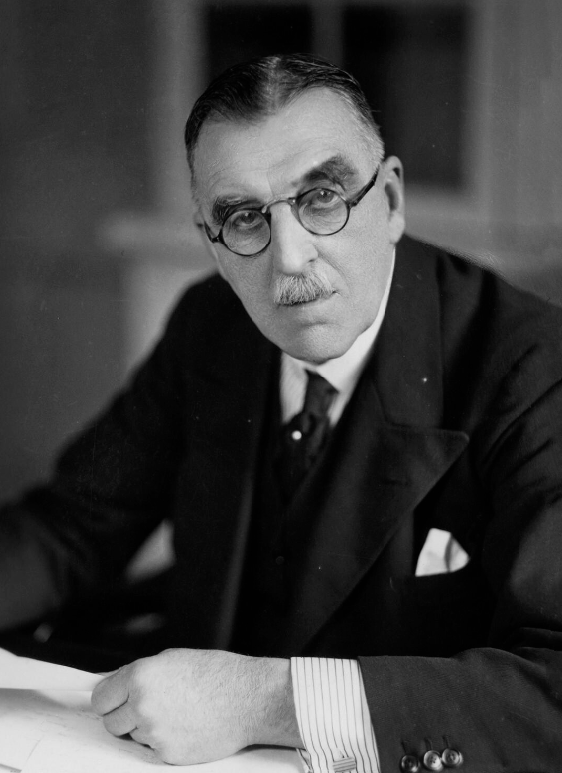
- Griffith-Boscawen in 1946

Minister of Agriculture
- In office 1921–1922
- Preceded by: The Lord Lee of Fareham
- Succeeded by: Sir Robert Sanders

Minister of Health
- In office 19 October 1922 – 7 March 1923
- Preceded by: Alfred Mond
- Succeeded by: Neville Chamberlain

Personal details
- Born: Arthur Sackville Trevor Griffith; 18 October 1865 Trefalyn, Denbighshire, Wales
- Died: 1 June 1946 (aged 80) London, England

Sir Arthur Sackville Trevor Griffith-Boscawen PC (18 October 1865 – 1 June 1946) was a British politician in the Conservative Party whose career was cut short by losing a string of Parliamentary elections.

== Biography ==
Sir Arthur was born at Trevalyn Hall, Denbighshire, into a distinguished family of Welsh, Cornish, and Scottish lineage. He had an elder brother, Boscawen Trevor, and two sisters, Helen Evelyn Trevor (who married Brig.-Gen. Hugh Archdale) and Alice Catherine Trevor. His mother, Helen Sophia Duff (1834–1930), was the eldest daughter of Admiral Norwich Duff. Her grandfather George Duff was killed at the Battle of Trafalgar. His father, Captain Boscawen Trevor Griffith, served with the 23rd Welsh Fusiliers and saw action during the Crimean War; he was also chairman of the Denbighshire Court of Quarter Sessions for many years. The captain was the only son of Thomas Griffith and his second wife, Elizabeth Mary Boscawen, the daughter of Lt.-Gen. Hon. George Boscawen, who was the fourth son of Viscount Falmouth. In 1875, the family assumed the additional surname of Boscawen when Elizabeth died.

Sir Arthur was educated at Rugby School and Queen's College, Oxford.

In 1892, he was elected Member of Parliament for Tonbridge in Kent, a county for which he became JP in 1896. Salisbury, whom he accused of ignoring 90% of MPs, appointed him private secretary to Chancellor of the Exchequer Michael Hicks-Beach in 1895, a job he held before becoming Parliamentary Charity Commissioner in 1900, serving until 1905. Griffith-Boscawen may have been influential in helping to choose Alfred Milner as the new Governor of Cape Colony. The aged Lord Rosmead was retiring, leaving the government, and Chamberlain in particular desperate to find a replacement. The choice of Milner, a brilliant Oxford scholar, was universally acclaimed in parliament as a shrewd option; the candidate was warmly praised for his courage in coming forward during the Jameson Raid crisis.

Griffith-Boscawen lost his Tonbridge seat in the 1906 general election. He unsuccessfully contested East Denbighshire at a by-election in August that year, and Dudley, Worcestershire at the first general election held in 1910, before being returned for the latter seat later that year. He also sat as a member of the London County Council from 1910 to 1913; he was knighted in 1911.

Griffith-Boscawen had a special interest in working class housing throughout his career. He was a Tariff Reformer who admired Joseph Chamberlain because he became a very influential Conservative even though he was not from an aristocratic background. He carved out a niche for himself as a parliamentary Churchman and strongly opposed moves to disestablish the Welsh Church; following its disestablishment and the end of his parliamentary career, he chaired the Welsh Church Commissioners from 1923 to 1945.

Griffith-Boscawen was commissioned into the part-time 3rd (West Kent Militia) Battalion, Queen's Own (Royal West Kent Regiment), with which he saw embodied service in Malta during the time of the Second Boer War in 1899–1900. The battalion later became the 3rd (Reserve) Battalion, Queen's Own (Royal West Kent Regiment) in the Special Reserve, and he commanded it as Lieutenant-Colonel from 1910. He was mobilised with the battalion at the outbreak of World War I, later commanding a garrison battalion of the Hampshire Regiment at Saint-Omer in France from 1914 to 1916, for which he was mentioned in dispatches.

He was recalled to become Parliamentary Secretary at the Ministry of Pensions in December 1916, then served as Parliamentary Under Secretary of the Board of Agriculture from 1918 to 1921. He was appointed to the Privy Council in the 1920 New Year Honours, entitling him to the style "The Right Honourable".

In 1921, he was appointed to the Lloyd George Coalition Government as Minister of Agriculture but under the law at the time he was required to automatically stand for re-election to the House of Commons. Griffith-Boscawen lost the ensuing by-election, in part because of Lord Beaverbrook's Canadian Cattle campaign, but another seat was found for him at a by-election in Taunton and he continued his career in government. Five years later the law on ministerial appointments would be amended to end the requirement for such by-elections.

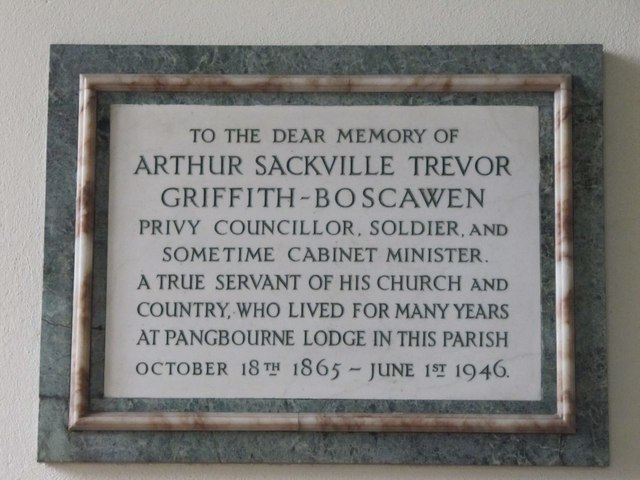
Memorial in St James the Less, Pangbourne

When Lloyd George's government fell in October 1922, Griffith-Boscawen was one of only a few members of the outgoing Cabinet who agreed to serve under the new Prime Minister, Bonar Law, who promoted him to Minister of Health. The following month a general election was held and Griffith-Boscawen once more lost his Taunton seat. He remained in government and set about producing a bill on local government rating which provoked fierce controversy in the country at large. In March 1923 he sought to re-enter the House of Commons in a by-election at Mitcham, but was defeated by the future Labour Cabinet Minister, James Chuter Ede. Griffith-Boscawen was forced to retire from politics as a result. The resulting vacancy in the Cabinet was filled by Neville Chamberlain.

Griffith-Boscawen wrote Fourteen Years in Parliament in 1907 and his Memoirs in 1925. In later life he resided at Pangbourne, Berkshire, and died in London in June 1946 aged 80.

== Sources ==
- "Sir Arthur Griffith-Boscawen", Oxford Dictionary of National Biography, Oxford
- Andrew Roberts (1999). Salisbury: Victorian Titan. London.

Parliament of the United Kingdom
Preceded by Robert Norton	Member of Parliament for Tunbridge; 1892–1906	Succeeded by Alfred Paget Hedges
Preceded by Arthur George Hooper	Member of Parliament for Dudley; Dec. 1910–1921	Succeeded by James Wilson
Preceded by Dennis Boles	Member of Parliament for Taunton; 1921–1922	Succeeded by John Hope Simpson
Political offices
Preceded by The Lord Lee of Fareham	Minister of Agriculture; 1921–1922	Succeeded by Sir Robert Sanders
Preceded by Alfred Mond	Minister of Health; 1922–1923	Succeeded by Neville Chamberlain
