= Dudley East =

UK Parliament constituency (1974–1997)

- Former borough constituency for the House of Commons
- County: West Midlands

February 1974–1997
- Seats: One
- Created from: Brierley Hill; Dudley
- Replaced by: Dudley North; Dudley South; Stourbridge

Dudley East was a parliamentary constituency, centred on the town of Dudley in the West Midlands. It returned one Member of Parliament (MP) to the House of Commons of the Parliament of the United Kingdom by the first-past-the-post system.

The constituency was created for the February 1974 general election, and abolished for the 1997 general election.

== History ==
Throughout its history, it was served by one member: John Gilbert of the Labour Party.

== Boundaries ==
1974–1983: The County Borough of Dudley wards of Castle, Coseley East, Coseley West, Netherton and Woodside, Priory, St Andrew's, St James's, and St Thomas's.

1983–1997: The Metropolitan Borough of Dudley wards of Castle and Priory, Coseley East, Coseley West, Netherton and Woodside, Quarry Bank and Cradley, St Andrew's, St James's, and St Thomas's.

Dudley East was one of three constituencies in the Metropolitan Borough of Dudley, covering as its name suggested the eastern part of the town of Dudley, including the town centre, along with Coseley and parts of Sedgley. At abolition in 1997, both Dudley East and Dudley West were replaced by two new constituencies: Dudley North and Dudley South, with some constituents being transferred to the re-created Stourbridge constituency.

== Members of Parliament ==
Election	Member	Party
Feb 1974	John Gilbert	Labour
1997	constituency abolished: see Dudley North, Dudley South and Stourbridge	

== Elections ==
=== Elections in the 1970s ===
1970 notional result
Party	Vote	%
Labour	22,800	52.1
Conservative	21,000	47.9
Turnout	43,800	72.4
Electorate	60,498	

General election February 1974: Dudley East
Party	Candidate	Votes	%	±%
Labour	John Gilbert	27,417	63.4	+11.4
Conservative	John Taylor	15,795	36.6	−11.4
Majority		11,622	26.9	+22.8
Turnout		43,212	72.1	−0.3
Registered electors		59,897		
Labour hold		Swing	+11.4	

General election October 1974: Dudley East
Party	Candidate	Votes	%	±%
Labour	John Gilbert	23,621	57.3	−6.1
Conservative	John Taylor	11,430	27.7	−8.8
Liberal	Owen Hopkins	5,003	12.1	New
National Front	Charles Knott	1,171	2.8	New
Majority		12,191	29.6	+2.7
Turnout		41,225	68.3	−3.9
Registered electors		60,381		
Labour hold		Swing	+1.3	

General election 1979: Dudley East
Party	Candidate	Votes	%	±%
Labour	John Gilbert	22,521	53.8	−3.5
Conservative	Donald Williams	14,834	35.5	+7.7
Liberal	Gerald Lewis	3,639	8.7	−3.4
National Front	Albert Baker	844	2.0	−0.8
Majority		7,687	18.4	−11.2
Turnout		41,838	70.1	+1.9
Registered electors		59,661		
Labour hold		Swing	−5.6	

1979 notional result
Party	Vote	%
Labour	27,322	53.7
Conservative	17,862	35.1
Liberal	4,815	9.5
Others	896	1.8
Turnout	50,895	
Electorate		

=== Elections in the 1980s ===
General election 1983: Dudley East
Party	Candidate	Votes	%	±%
Labour	John Gilbert	24,441	45.8	−7.9
Conservative	Susan Gillies	18,625	34.9	−0.2
SDP	Dominic Simon	10,272	19.3	+9.8
Majority		5,816	10.9	−7.7
Turnout		53,338	71.3	
Registered electors		74,765		
Labour hold		Swing	−3.8	

General election 1987: Dudley East
Party	Candidate	Votes	%	±%
Labour	John Gilbert	24,942	45.9	±0.0
Conservative	Elisabeth Jones	21,469	39.5	+4.6
SDP	Kevin Monks	7,965	14.6	−4.6
Majority		3,473	6.4	−4.5
Turnout		54,376	72.3	+1.0
Registered electors		75,206		
Labour hold		Swing	−2.3	

=== Elections in the 1990s ===
General election 1992: Dudley East
Party	Candidate	Votes	%	±%
Labour	John Gilbert	29,806	52.8	+6.9
Conservative	CJ Holland	20,606	36.5	−3.0
Liberal Democrats	IC Jenkins	5,400	9.6	−5.1
National Front	GE Cartwright	675	1.2	New
Majority		9,200	16.3	+9.9
Turnout		56,487	75.0	+2.7
Registered electors		75,355		
Labour hold		Swing	+5.0	

== See also ==
- List of parliamentary constituencies in Dudley
