= Stafford Harry Northcote, Viscount Saint Cyres =

English diplomat and historian

Stafford Harry Northcote, Viscount Saint Cyres KStJ (29 August 1869 – 2 February 1926) was an English diplomat and historian.

The only son of Walter Stafford Northcote, 2nd Earl of Iddesleigh and Elizabeth Lucy Meysey-Thompson, he was styled as Viscount Saint Cyres from 1887 until his death. He was educated at Eton and Merton College, Oxford, where he graduated BA with a First in modern history and later MA. He was Secretary and Counsellor in Her Majesty's Diplomatic Service and was also active as a historian. In 1914 he was awarded the honorary degree of Doctor of Literature. He was appointed a Knight of Justice of the Order of St John of Jerusalem and was a Justice of the Peace. In 1922 he was living at 84, Eaton Square, Belgravia.

On 9 July 1912, Northcote married Dorothy Morrison (born c. 1872), a daughter of Alfred Morrison. They had no children and he died on 2 February 1926 aged 56. His widow survived until 1936.

== Selected publications ==
- François de Fénelon (London: Methuen, 1901)
- The Gallican Church, The Cambridge Modern History Vol. V (Cambridge University Press, 1908)
- Pascal (London: Smith, Elder & Company, 1909; New York: E. P. Dutton)
- "The Sorrows of Mrs. Charlotte Smith", Cornhill Magazine, vol. 15 (1903), pp. 686–96

== In popular culture ==
Northcote is quoted in The Dictionary of Modern Proverbs (Yale, 2012): “We do not care for things once they are ours; what we enjoy is running after them.”
