= George Wigg =

British Labour Party politician

The Right Honourable The Lord Wigg PC

Paymaster General
- In office 19 October 1964 – 12 November 1967
- Prime Minister: Harold Wilson
- Preceded by: John Boyd-Carpenter
- Succeeded by: Judith Hart

Member of Parliament for Dudley
- In office 5 July 1945 – 30 November 1967
- Preceded by: Cyril Lloyd
- Succeeded by: Donald Williams

Personal details
- Born: George Edward Cecil Wigg; 28 November 1900 West Ham, Essex, England
- Died: 11 August 1983 (aged 82) Lambeth, South London, England
- Party: Labour
- Spouse: Florence Veal (m. 1930)
- Children: 3
- Education: Queen Mary's School for Boys, Basingstoke
- Military career
- Allegiance: United Kingdom
- Branch: British Army
- Service years: 1918–1945
- Rank: Colonel
- Units: Army Educational Corps (after 1937); Royal Tank Corps (until 1937)

George Edward Cecil Wigg, Baron Wigg, PC (28 November 1900 – 11 August 1983) was a British Labour Party politician who only served in relatively junior offices but had a great deal of influence behind the scenes, especially with Harold Wilson.

== Background and early career ==
Wigg was the eldest of six children of Edward William Wigg (1870–1934), of Uxbridge Road, Ealing, manager of a dairy business, and his wife Cecilia (née Comber). Whilst Wigg's mother was extremely industrious, delivering milk alongside doing all the household work, his father was "indolent, disgruntled and lacking ambition" despite his wife's encouragement. On the failure of his own dairy business, Edward Wigg worked for that of his elder brother; George Wigg worked there alongside his father from the age of ten. After years of poor fortunes and having suffered from alcoholism, Edward was found dead in Ewhurst Lake in 1934, near to his birthplace; his son observed: "Why he was at the lake and how he got into it remains a mystery. The coroner recorded a verdict of death by misadventure." Cecilia Wigg subsequently remarried to a soldier.

George Wigg was educated at Fairfields Council School and at Queen Mary's Grammar School, both in Basingstoke. Wigg served in the British Army as a regular soldier for almost all his career (from 1918 to 1937) up to his election as the Member of Parliament (MP) for Dudley in 1945. He served in the Royal Tank Corps from 1919 to 1937 and returned to service in the Second World War, being commissioned into the Army Educational Corps in 1940 and serving until 1946 and reaching the rank of colonel. He was Parliamentary Private Secretary to Emanuel Shinwell during the Attlee government.

According to Press Association reporter Chris Moncrieff, Wigg was unpopular with Labour MPs, but managed to use procedure to place the Profumo affair on the record in Parliament, leading to the pursuit of Profumo which ultimately resulted in the latter's resignation. Wigg also played an important part in the aftermath of the failed prosecution of suspected serial killer John Bodkin Adams by questioning in Parliament the unusual conduct of the Prosecution led by Attorney-General, Reginald Manningham-Buller.

In January 1964, Wigg won a High Court action for libel against Angus Maude, a Conservative member. He was represented in court by Alan Orr QC, and substantial damages were awarded.

== Paymaster-General; Peerage ==
Wigg was already known for passing on gossip to Harold Wilson (who had become Labour leader in 1963 on the death of Hugh Gaitskell). When Labour narrowly won the 1964 election Wilson appointed Wigg to the office of Paymaster General. Wigg's responsibilities were many and varied: among them, he was Wilson's link to the Security Service and the Secret Intelligence Service. In November 1967, he was appointed Chairman of the Horserace Betting Levy Board (Wigg loved horse racing) and left Parliament. He was created a life peer on 27 November 1967 taking the title Baron Wigg, of the Borough of Dudley. His resignation from parliament resulted in a by-election in the Dudley seat in early 1968, with the Conservatives gaining the seat before Labour reclaimed it at the general election two years later.

Wigg had been made a Privy Councillor in 1964.

== Personal life ==
In 1930, Wigg married Florence, daughter of William Veal. They had three daughters.

Parliament of the United Kingdom
Preceded by Cyril Lloyd	Member of Parliament for Dudley; 1945–1967	Succeeded by Donald Williams
Political offices
Preceded by John Boyd-Carpenter	Paymaster General; 1964–1967	Vacant Title next held by Lord Shackleton
