= Stafford Northcote, 1st Earl of Iddesleigh =

British politician (1818–1887)

The Right Honourable The Earl of Iddesleigh GCB PC FRS
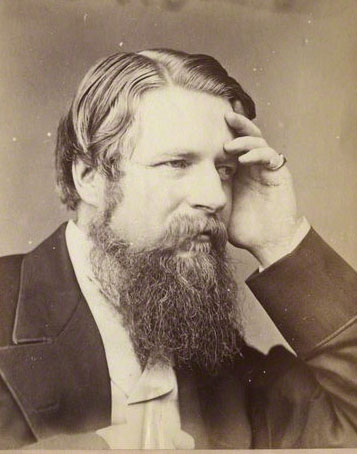
- Iddesleigh in 1870s

First Lord of the Treasury
- In office 29 June 1885 – 1 February 1886
- Monarch: Victoria
- Prime Minister: The Marquess of Salisbury
- Preceded by: William Ewart Gladstone
- Succeeded by: William Ewart Gladstone

Chancellor of the Exchequer
- In office 21 February 1874 – 21 April 1880
- Monarch: Victoria
- Prime Minister: Benjamin Disraeli
- Preceded by: William Ewart Gladstone
- Succeeded by: William Ewart Gladstone

Secretary of State for Foreign Affairs
- In office 3 August 1886 – 12 January 1887
- Monarch: Victoria
- Prime Minister: The Marquess of Salisbury
- Preceded by: The Earl of Rosebery
- Succeeded by: The Marquess of Salisbury

President of the Board of Trade
- In office 6 July 1866 – 8 March 1867
- Monarch: Victoria
- Prime Minister: The Earl of Derby
- Preceded by: Thomas Milner Gibson
- Succeeded by: The Duke of Richmond

Personal details
- Born: 27 October 1818 London, England
- Died: 12 January 1887 (aged 68) London, England
- Party: Conservative
- Spouse: Cecilia Frances Farrer (died 1910)
- Children: 10, including Walter, Henry, and Amyas
- Education: Balliol College, Oxford

Stafford Henry Northcote, 1st Earl of Iddesleigh GCB PC FRS (/ˈnɔːrθkət/ NORTH-kət, 27 October 1818 – 12 January 1887), known as Sir Stafford Northcote, 8th Baronet, from 1851 to 1885, was a British Conservative politician. He was Chancellor of the Exchequer between 1874 and 1880, First Lord of the Treasury between 1885 and 1886 and as Foreign Secretary between 1886 and 1887.

According to Nigel Keohane, historians have portrayed him "as a man who fell short of the ultimate achievement of being prime minister largely because of personal weakness, and lack of political virility and drive."

== Background and education ==
Northcote was born at Portland Place, Marylebone, London, on 27 October 1818. He was the eldest son of Henry Stafford Northcote (1792–1850), eldest son of Sir Stafford Henry Northcote, 7th Baronet and Jacquetta Baring, a member of the Baring family. His mother was Agnes Mary (died 1840), daughter of Thomas Cockburn of the famed Cockburn of Henderland family and Henrietta Colebrooke, natural daughter of Robert Colebrooke, MP. His paternal Northcote ancestors had long been settled in Devon, tracing their descent from Galfridas de Nordcote who settled there in 1103. The family home was situated at Pynes House northwest of Exeter. Northcote was educated at Eton and Balliol College, Oxford and was called to the bar, Inner Temple, in 1847.

== Early political career ==
In 1843 Northcote became private secretary to William Ewart Gladstone at the Board of Trade. Northcote was afterwards legal secretary to the board and, after acting as one of the secretaries to the Great Exhibition of 1851, co-operated with Sir Charles Trevelyan in framing the Northcote–Trevelyan Report, which revolutionized the conditions of appointment to the Civil Service. He succeeded his grandfather, Sir Stafford Henry Northcote (1762–1851), as 8th baronet in 1851. He entered Parliament in 1855 as Conservative Member of Parliament for Dudley with the support of the influential local landowner Lord Ward. However, tensions between Northcote and Lord Ward soon arose, in particular over a vote over conflict with China in which the two men supported opposite sides in the vote. Northcote subsequently decided not to contest Dudley again and stood unsuccessfully for North Devon in 1857. He returned to Parliament the following year, when he was elected for Stamford in 1858, a seat that he exchanged in 1866 for North Devon. He was briefly Financial Secretary to the Treasury under the Earl of Derby from January to July 1859.

== Later political career ==
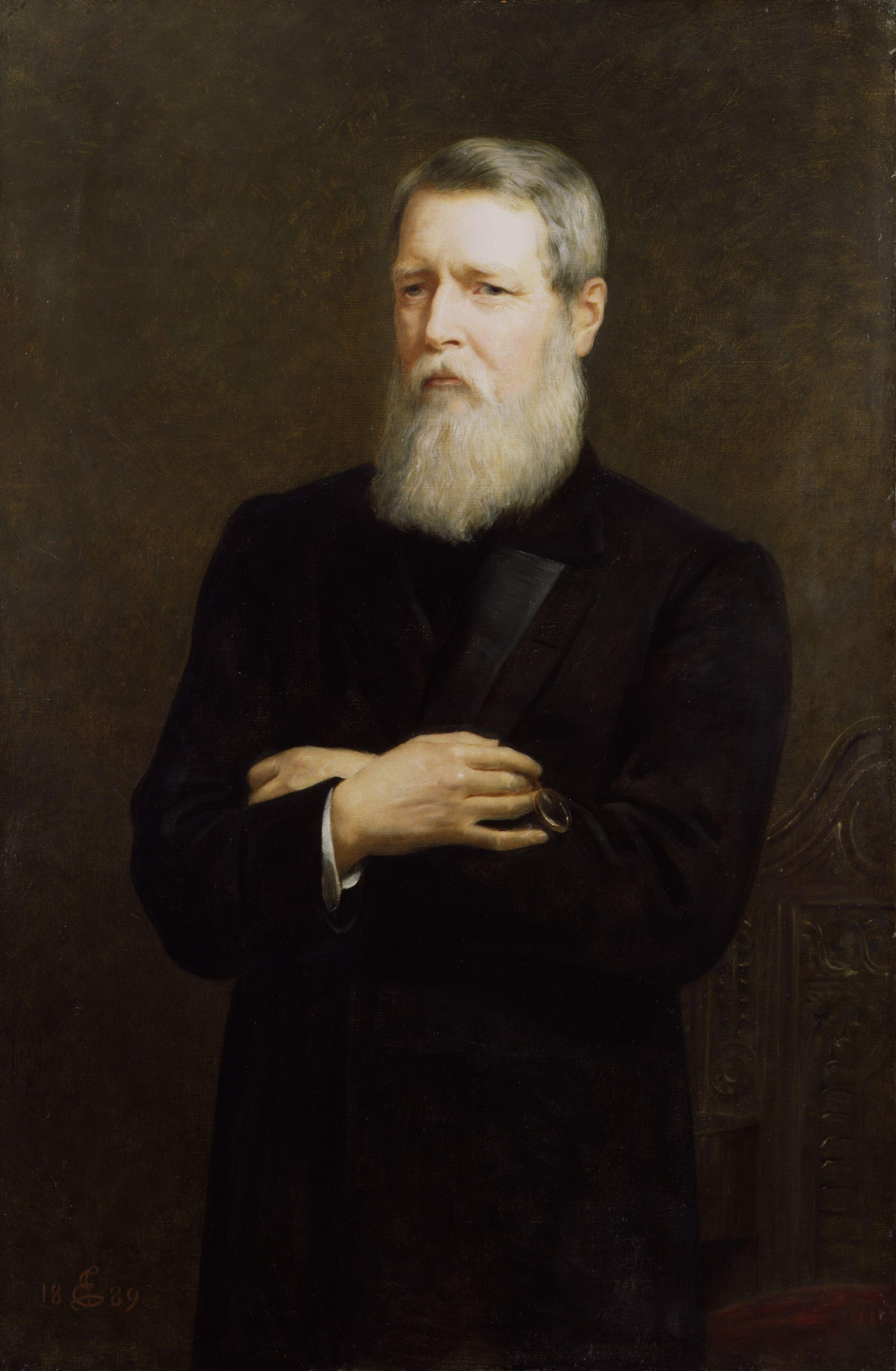
The Earl of Iddesleigh by Edwin Long.

Steadily supporting his party, he became President of the Board of Trade in 1866, Secretary of State for India in 1867 and Chancellor of the Exchequer in 1874. In 1870, during the interval between the last two appointments, he was the Governor of the Hudson's Bay Company, North America's oldest company (established by an English royal charter in 1670), when it sold the Northwest Territories to Canada. Northcote was one of the commissioners for the settlement of the Alabama Claims with the United States, culminating with the Treaty of Washington in 1871.

On Benjamin Disraeli's elevation to the House of Lords as Earl of Beaconsfield in 1876, Northcote became Leader of the Conservatives in the Commons. As a finance minister, he largely continued the lines of policy laid down by Gladstone. However, he distinguished himself by his dealings with the debt, especially his introduction of the new sinking fund in 1876 by which he fixed the annual charge for the debt in such a way as to provide for a regular series of payments off the capital.

His temper as leader was, however, too gentle to satisfy the more ardent spirits among his own followers. Party cabals (in which Lord Randolph Churchill took a leading part) led to Northcote's elevation to the Lords in 1885, when Lord Salisbury became prime minister. Taking the titles of Earl of Iddesleigh and Viscount St Cyres, he was included in the cabinet as First Lord of the Treasury. In Lord Salisbury's 1886 ministry he became Foreign Secretary, but the arrangement was not a comfortable one, and his resignation had just been decided upon when on 12 January 1887, he died very suddenly at the First Lord of the Treasury's official residence, 10 Downing Street.

== Other public positions ==
Northcote was elected a Fellow of the Royal Society in 1875 and Lord Rector of Edinburgh University in 1883, in which capacity he addressed the students on the subject of "Desultory Reading". From 1886 to 1887 he was also Lord Lieutenant of Devon. He was not a prolific or notable writer, but amongst his works were Twenty Years of Financial Policy (1862), a valuable study of Gladstonian finance, and Lectures and Essays (1887). His Life by Andrew Lang appeared in 1890. Northcote was appointed a CB in 1851 and a GCB in 1880 and was sworn of the Privy Council in 1866. He was one of only two people to hold the office of First Lord of the Treasury without ever being Prime Minister.

== Family and personal life ==
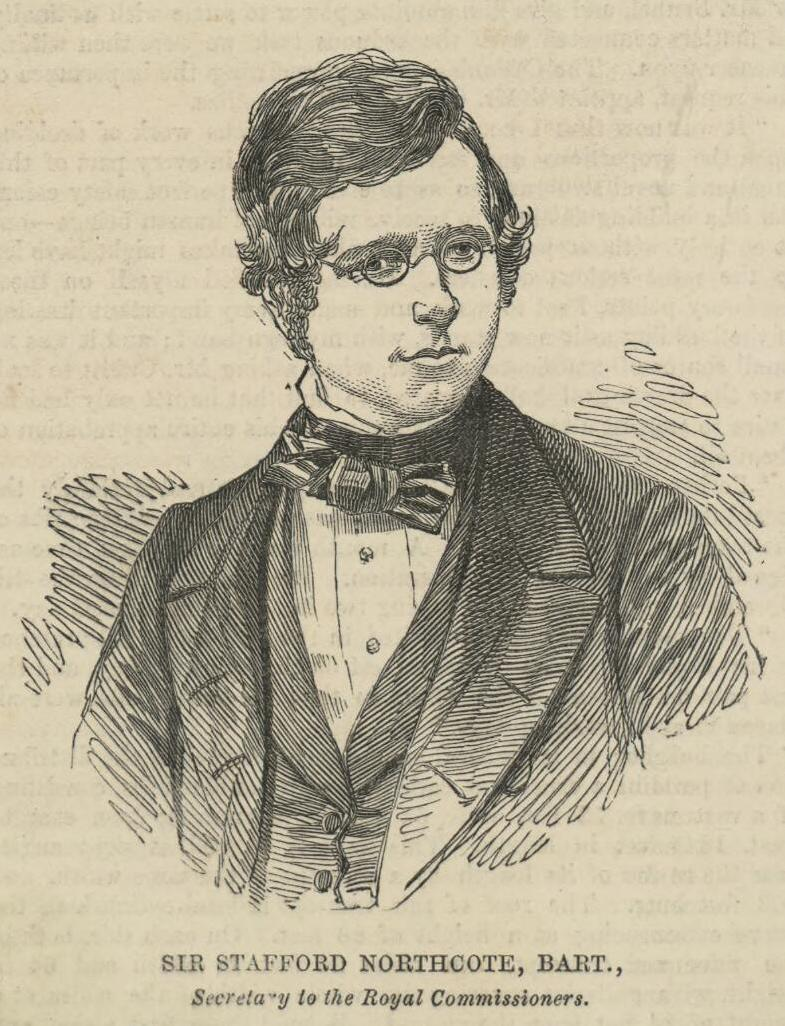
Portrait of Sir Stafford Northcote, c.1850s

Northcote married Cecilia Frances Farrer (died 1910), daughter of Thomas Farrer and sister of Thomas Farrer, 1st Baron Farrer, in 1843. They had seven sons and three daughters. His eldest son, Walter, 2nd Earl of Iddesleigh, was a member of the House of Lords. His second son, Henry, 1st Baron Northcote, was Governor-General of Australia. Another son, Amyas, later became known as a writer of ghost stories.

In the aftermath of the British Expedition to Abyssinia, Northcote built up a small but prestigious collection of Ethiopian artefacts that is now in the British Museum.

The 1881 Census shows him living next door to Lord Randolph Churchill MP and family, at 30 St James Place, Westminster.

== Legacy ==
The New Zealand suburbs of Northcote in Auckland, and Northcote in Christchurch are named after Northcote. As is the administrative headquarters of Exeter University, Northcote House. The unincorporated community of Northcote, Minnesota was named for him. Northcote Road in Battersea, London also seems to have been named after him.

Parliament of the United Kingdom
Preceded by John Benbow	Member of Parliament for Dudley; 1855–1857	Succeeded by Henry Brinsley Sheridan
Preceded by Lord Robert Cecil; John Inglis	Member of Parliament for Stamford; 1858–1866; With: Lord Robert Cecil (Viscount Cranborne from 1865)	Succeeded by Viscount Cranborne; Sir John Dalrymple-Hay, Bt
Preceded by Charles Hepburn-Stuart-Forbes-Trefusis; Sir Thomas Dyke Acland, Bt	Member of Parliament for Devonshire North; 1866–1885; With: Sir Thomas Dyke Acland, Bt	Succeeded by Sir Thomas Dyke Acland, Bt; John Moore-Stevens
Political offices
Preceded by George Alexander Hamilton	Financial Secretary to the Treasury; 1859	Succeeded by Samuel Laing
Preceded by Thomas Milner Gibson	President of the Board of Trade; 1866–1867	Succeeded by The Duke of Richmond
Preceded by The Marquess of Salisbury	Secretary of State for India; 1867–1868	Succeeded by The Duke of Argyll
Preceded by William Ewart Gladstone	Chancellor of the Exchequer; 1874–1880	Succeeded by William Ewart Gladstone
Preceded by Benjamin Disraeli	Leader of the House of Commons; 1876–1880	Succeeded by William Ewart Gladstone
Preceded by William Ewart Gladstone	First Lord of the Treasury; 1885–1886	Succeeded by William Ewart Gladstone
Preceded by The Earl of Rosebery	Foreign Secretary; 1886–1887	Succeeded by The Marquess of Salisbury
Party political offices
Preceded by Benjamin Disraeli	Conservative Leader of the Commons; 1876–1885	Succeeded by Sir Michael Hicks Beach, Bt
Academic offices
Preceded by Earl of Rosebery	Rector of the University of Edinburgh; 1883–1887	Succeeded by The Marquess of Lothian
Honorary titles
Preceded by The Duke of Somerset	Lord Lieutenant of Devon; 1886–1887	Succeeded by The Lord Clinton
Baronetage of England
Preceded by Stafford Henry Northcote	Baronet (of Hayne); 1851–1887	Succeeded by Walter Stafford Northcote
Peerage of the United Kingdom
New creation	Earl of Iddesleigh; 1885–1887	Succeeded by Walter Stafford Northcote
