= Amyas Northcote =

British writer (1864–1923)

Amyas Stafford Northcote (1864–1923) was a British writer from an aristocratic family.

== Family ==
Northcote was the youngest child and seventh son of Sir Stafford Northcote, 1st Earl of Iddesleigh (the Chancellor of the Exchequer under Disraeli) and his wife Cecilia Frances Farrer, sister of Thomas Farrer, 1st Baron Farrer.

He married Helen May Dudley on 14 May 1890. The couple had two children, a daughter Cecilia and a son the Rev. Dudley Northcote, both of whom died unmarried.

== Career ==
Northcote spent some time in Chicago, running a small business there.

He wrote ghost stories in the line of those of M. R. James, which were compiled in his only book, In Ghostly Company.

He was for several years a Justice of the Peace in Buckinghamshire.
