= 1941 Dudley by-election =

UK Parliamentary by-election

The 1941 Dudley by-election was held on 23 July 1941. The by-election was held due to the death of the incumbent Conservative MP, Dudley Joel. It was won by the Conservative candidate Cyril Lloyd.

Dudley by-election, 1941
Party	Candidate	Votes	%	±%
Conservative	Cyril Lloyd	6,234	56.1	+1.3
National	Noel Pemberton Billing	4,869	43.9	New
Majority		1,365	12.2	+2.6
Turnout		11,103	34.7	−40.6
Conservative hold		Swing	N/A	
