= Donald Williams (politician) =

British chartered accountant and politician

(William) Donald Williams (17 October 1919 – 5 January 1990) was a British chartered accountant and Conservative Party politician.

Williams went to the Royal Grammar School in Worcester. Before he could go out to work, the outbreak of the Second World War led him to join the Worcester Regiment. He was taken prisoner at Dunkirk and spent four and a half years in German prisoner-of-war camps, but escaped in January 1945 and went through Russia to get back to Britain in March 1945.

After the war he qualified as a Chartered Accountant in 1949, and in April 1950 became a Partner in Kendall, Wadley and Company, based in Malvern, Worcestershire. At the 1966 general election, he was the Conservative Party candidate in Dudley against George Wigg.

When Wigg resigned, Williams was selected to fight the seat in the ensuing byelection. This came at a time when Harold Wilson's Labour government was very unpopular and Williams achieved a large swing to win the seat in March 1968. In Parliament, Williams was friendly with neighbouring MP Enoch Powell and allied with the right, voting against the Race Relations Bill in 1968 and opposing House of Lords reform.

Williams lost his seat at the 1970 general election, with Labour regaining it, although the Conservatives ousted Labour from government at that election. Three years later he was elected to Hereford and Worcester County Council. He was an unsuccessful Conservative candidate for Dudley East at the 1979 general election. He had left his previous accountancy firms, and became a company director of a food company and an electronic engineering company.

Parliament of the United Kingdom
Preceded by George Wigg	Member of Parliament for Dudley; 1968–1970	Succeeded by John Gilbert
