= Walter Northcote, 2nd Earl of Iddesleigh =

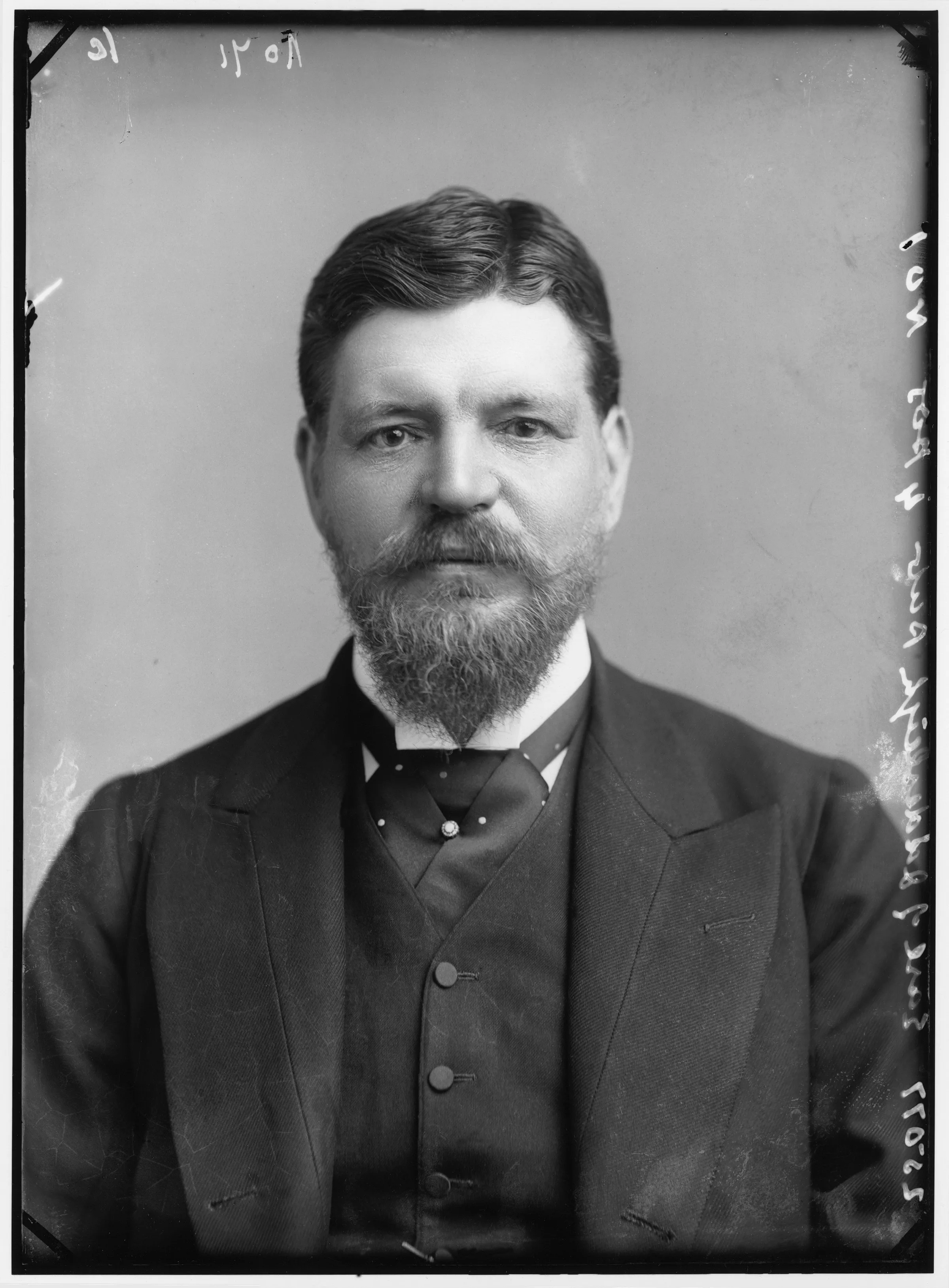
Portrait by Alexander Bassano, 1895

Walter Stafford Northcote, 2nd Earl of Iddesleigh CB (7 August 1845 – 26 May 1927) was an English landowner, peer, civil servant, and author, a member of the House of Lords from 1887 until his death.

== Life and career ==
The son of Stafford Henry Northcote, 1st Earl of Iddesleigh and Cecilia Frances Farrer, Northcote was Commissioner, deputy-chairman, and chairman of the Board of Inland Revenue between 1877 and 1892. In 1887 he succeeded his father in the recently created peerages of Viscount Saint Cyres and Earl of Iddesleigh. In his youth his was educated at Eton College and Balliol College, Oxford.

Walter worked and promoted from commissioner in 1877 to become department chairman of the Inland Revenue in 1886, then chairman from 1892. He was also a Justice of the Peace for Devon and in 1887 was appointed as a Companion of the Order of the Bath.

Iddesleigh, Alberta, was named in his honour.

== Family ==
On 23 September 1868 Northcote married Elizabeth Lucy Meysey-Thompson, a daughter of Sir Harry Stephen Meysey-Thompson, 1st Baronet, and Elizabeth Anne Croft. They had a son and three daughters:

- Stafford Harry Northcote, Viscount Saint Cyres (29 August 1869 – 2 February 1926)
- Lady Katharine Cecilia Rachel Northcote (Died 21 October 1893)
- Lady Rosalind Lucy Northcote (1873-31 December 1950)
- Lady Elizabeth Mabel Northcote (8 March 1876- 27 September 1915) married 13th Lieutenant Governor of British Columbia Robert Randolph Bruce.

The second Earl of Iddesleigh died on 26 May 1927, at the age of 81. As his only son had died childless the year before, he was succeeded by a nephew, Henry Stafford Northcote, 3rd Earl of Iddesleigh (1901–1970).
