= Thomas Hawkes (MP) =

English industrialist and politician

Thomas Hawkes (1778-1858) was an English industrialist and politician. He inherited a glass-making business from his father. He was elected as MP for Dudley in 1834, defeating the sitting candidate, Sir John Campbell. He thus became the second person to represent Dudley at the UK Parliament. He retained his Parliamentary seat in three subsequent elections, stepping down in 1844 after having financial problems. He served as Sheriff of Worcestershire in 1811 and he was appointed as captain of the Himley Troop of the Staffordshire Yeomanry in 1819, in which he served for more than twenty years. One of his daughters married the brother of Baron Ward, the Lord of Dudley Castle. He was declared bankrupt shortly before his death in 1858.

== Biography ==
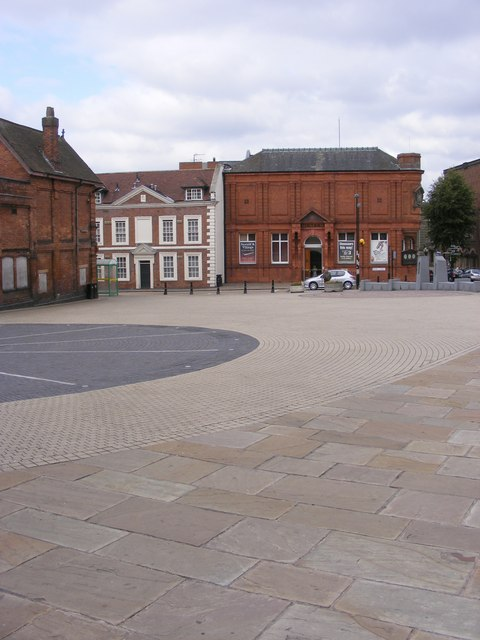
Stone Street Square, Dudley: the site of the glassworks built by Abiathar Hawkes and later owned and operated by Thomas Hawkes

Thomas Hawkes was born in 1778, the son of Abiathar and Mary Hawkes. His father was involved in the glass industry and had founded the Dudley Flint Glassworks situated in King Street, Dudley. Abiathar Hawkes built a new glassworks on the corner of Stone Street and Priory Street in the early 1780s. A price list issued in 1794 indicates that Thomas was already active in his father's firm at this date. Abiathar Hawkes died on 17 January 1800, leaving his glass business to two of his sons, Thomas and George Wright. Thomas Hawkes became a large scale glass manufacturer in his own right in the town of Dudley trading as Thomas Hawkes and Co.

On 26 February 1810, Hawkes was promoted from major to lieutenant-colonel in the Dudley Volunteer Infantry. In 1811, Hawkes served as Sheriff of Worcestershire.

On 2 April 1812, Hawkes convened a public meeting in the town of Dudley in order to petition parliament requesting free trade with the East Indies.

In 1814 he married Alice Anna Blackburne, daughter of John Blackburne of Hawford House, Worcester and of Wavertree Hall, Lancashire. John Blackburne had been Mayor of Liverpool in 1788 and owned land and had mining interests and a saltworks in Lancashire. As Alice was his only daughter, most of this property was inherited by Mr and Mrs Hawkes on Blackburne's death in 1826. The couple went on to have a large family including at least five daughters.

On 25 October 1816, Thomas and George Wright presented a "beautiful glass vase" on the occasion of laying the foundation stone of St Thomas' Church, Dudley. Inside the vase were placed "several medals commemorative of remarkable recent public events" and the vase itself placed in a recess in a stone block and incorporated in the wall of the church.

In 1816, Hawkes was listed as a magistrate for Staffordshire, residing at Himley.

In a commercial directory published in 1818, Thomas Hawkes & Co. is listed as a cut-glass manufacturer based at Stone Street, Dudley. In the same year, Thomas Hawkes was listed as residing at Himley in Staffordshire.

On 29 December 1819, Thomas Hawkes became a captain in the Himley Troop of the Queen's Own Royal Regiment of Staffordshire Yeomanry. In 1821, he attended the festivities at Dudley to celebrate the coronation of King George IV, when "Captain Hawkes, with the Himley and Enville Troop of Yeomanry, was met with a brass band of music by the principal gentlemen and escorted to the Town Hall." Hawkes served as captain of this Troop until at least 1840, although in 1843 his position was taken by the Hon. Dudley Ward.

George Wright Hawkes, Thomas's brother and business partner died in 1821 at Dudley, aged 40. By this time, a younger brother, Roger Wright Hawkes, had joined the business.

In July 1826, the Himley Troop of the Staffordshire Yeomanry were called out when disturbances were expected due to the wages of Dudley and Tipton colliers being reduced. According to the records of the Staffordshire Yeomanry: "it was thought necessary to read the riot act, which was done amidst the shouts of the colliers, followed by a shower of stones, by one of which Captain Hawkes was struck on the face, and several of the Yeomen were also wounded".

In the general elections of 1830 and 1831, Hawkes stood for Parliament for the constituency of Stafford, losing both times. after the 1830 election, Hawkes was given a dinner at the George Inn in Stafford with the mayor presiding to thank him for his gentlemanly conduct during the election period. He was presented with an inscribed tureen at the occasion.

Thomas Hawkes was listed as being a magistrate of "Stourbridge and its vicinity" in 1830.

In 1834, Hawkes helped establish the Dudley and West Bromwich Banking Company and became the Chairman of the company.

In 1834 he challenged Sir John Campbell (one of his opponents at the Stafford elections of 1830 and 1831) at a by-election to become MP for Dudley. Campbell had succeeded in becoming the first member of parliament for Dudley in modern history when he won the seat at the general election in 1832. However, when subsequently appointed as Attorney General, a by-election was called (as was the practice then), which took place on 27 February 1834. Thomas Hawkes won the seat with a majority of 68. The result provoked considerable disorder in the town. According to a local chronicler: "towards the close of the poll, (4 o’clock) when it became evident that Sir John was beaten, a serious riot arose in the town and it was deemed expedient by the Justices to read the Riot Act, and send off to Birmingham for military assistance; the Dragoons arrived in hot haste, but not before much mischief and violence had been done to both property and persons". C.F.G Clarke quotes a rhyme by Dudley poet Ben Boucher on the subject of the election:

Hawkes to Cape—ll gave a note,
And for five pounds bought his vote;
He therefore thus did change his coat
And to the Tories gave his vote.

Thomas Hawkes subsequently stood and won the seat in 1835, 1837 and 1841. He represented the Conservative Party. In 1837, it was reported that he commanded a troop of yeomanry. In 1844, he left Parliament by accepting the Chiltern Hundreds.

In 1835 a trade directory listed his glass business as being based in Stone Street, Dudley and at Queen Street, London.

Thomas Hawkes entered into a copartnership with another glass-maker, William Greathead, in 1836. The agreement was for a term of 7 years with management in the hands of William Greathead. Trading was to be under the name Hawkes and Co.

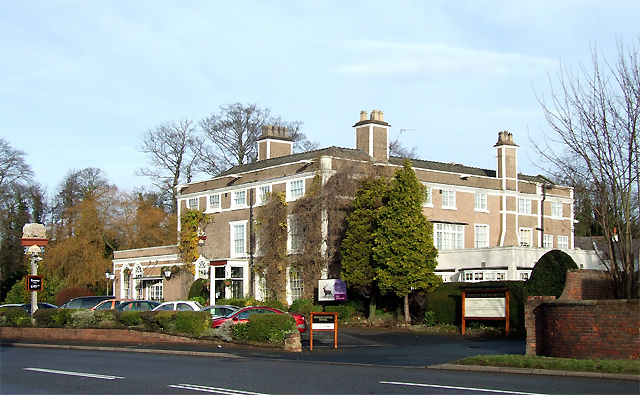
Now a hotel, Himley House was once the residence of Thomas Hawkes

In 1838, Hawkes was stated to be living at Himley House, Himley.

In 1841, in addition to his glass business, he was said to be "extensively engaged in mercantile and mining pursuits in Worcestershire and Lancashire" as well as being an honorary director of the Scottish Union Fire and Life Insurance Company and a director of the General Life and Invalid Assurance Association. He was also at this time a magistrate in Worcestershire and Staffordshire. On 24 June 1841 his eldest daughter, Mary, married Robert Rising of Worcester.

In April 1842, it was announced that the workers at the Dudley glassmaking business had been given a month's notice to leave and that the Dudley premises would close. In May 1842, the partnership between Thomas Hawkes and William Greathead, which ran the glass business in Dudley, was dissolved. On 6 June 1842, an auction was held at Dudley of the stock and equipment of Messrs. Hawkes and Co. The announcement of the auction stated that Mr. Hawkes was retiring from the glass business.

In May 1843, it was reported that it was expected that Hawkes would give up his parliamentary seat. Hawkes was stated to be residing in Nice at this time. In the same month he sold Wavertree Hall to the Liverpool Corporation for a sum of £10,000.

On 17 October 1843, Thomas's third daughter, Eleanor-Lucy, married the Hon. Humble-Dudley Ward, the younger brother of the Earl of Dudley. The marriage took place at the residence of the British Ambassador in Florence and Thomas Hawkes was stated to have given an elegant dejeuner on the occasion.

In 1844 he gave up his business activities after a creditor sued him successfully for a sum of £10,934. On 2 August of the same year, Hawkes gave up his parliamentary seat by accepting the Chiltern Hundreds. According to an article in the Daily News of 1 December 1849, "the pressure of pecuniary embarrassments obliged him, in 1844, to go abroad, with a view to repair his fortunes".

Thomas's second daughter, Alice Anna Catherine, married Octavius Warre Malet on 24 June 1852 at the British Consulate, Cologne.

Thomas's wife, Alice Anna, died at Trouville Sur Mer in France on 7 October 1853.

On the marriage of his fourth daughter, Maria Elizabeth, to John Pollard Willoughby in 1854, Thomas Hawkes was stated to be residing at Barnes in Surrey. Hawkes's fifth daughter, Henrietta Dorothy, married Henry Blundell Leigh in 1855.

In 1857, Hawkes was arrested over the £10,000 unpaid debt and held in the Queen's Prison. Here he applied for an adjudication of bankruptcy against himself and on 23 June 1857, Thomas Hawkes was declared bankrupt.

Thomas Hawkes died on 3 December 1858 at the age of 80 at Brighton and was buried at Himley On Wednesday 8 December 1858 shortly before the burial, the Mayor of Dudley, Mr E.Hollier, issued the following proclamation to the townspeople:

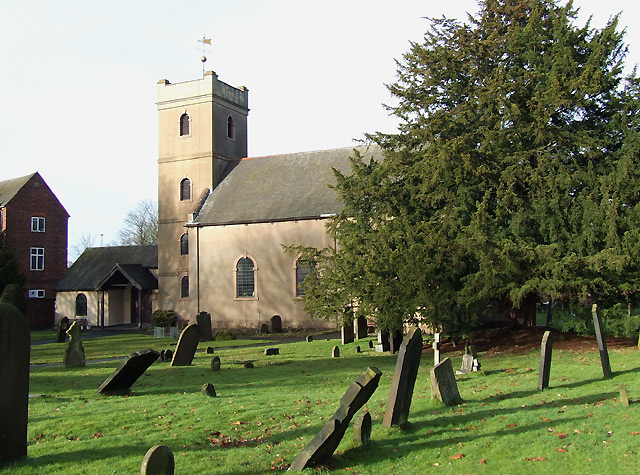
Thomas Hawkes was buried at St Michael's Church, Himley

THE MAYOR begs to apprize his fellow-townsmen that the remains of their formerly much respected Member, THOMAS HAWKES, Esq., will be conveyed through the Town for INTERMENT AT HIMLEY, on FRIDAY Morning next, and, as he thinks it may be desirable that some mark of respect should be shewn towards his memory by the PARTIAL CLOSING of their respective Establishments on the Morning of that day, he will be happy to meet those who accord with this desire at the OLD TOWN HALL, on THURSDAY Evening next, at SEVEN o’clock, to arrange accordingly.

The Stone Street glassworks had not operated since the early 1840s but the buildings remained until demolition in 1886. An archeological excavation of the site was carried out in 2003.

Parliament of the United Kingdom
Preceded by John Campbell	Member of Parliament for Dudley; 1834–1844	Succeeded by John Benbow
Honorary titles
Preceded by Joseph Smith	High Sheriff of Worcestershire; 1811	Succeeded by John Baker
