= Cyril Lloyd =

English businessman and parliamentarian

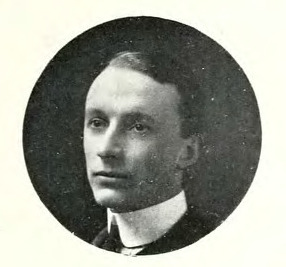

Member of Parliament for Dudley
- In office 15 November 1922 – 10 May 1929
- Preceded by: James Wilson
- Succeeded by: The Earl Baldwin of Bewdley
- In office 23 July 1941 – 15 June 1945
- Preceded by: Dudley Joel
- Succeeded by: The Lord Wigg

Personal details
- Born: Cyril Edward Lloyd; 1876 Moseley, Worcestershire, England
- Died: 19 February 1963 (aged 86–87) Stourbridge, Worcestershire, England
- Party: Conservative
- Spouse: Phyllis Gretchen Waterlow (m. 1909)
- Children: 1
- Education: Uppingham School; Mason Science College

Cyril Edward Lloyd (1876 –19 February 1963) was an English businessman and Conservative Member of Parliament between 1922 and 1929, and again from 1941 to 1945. He was a member of the Lloyds banking family, but made his career in engineering, serving as chairman of N. Hingley & Sons Ltd for more than forty years.

== Life and career ==
Lloyd was the son of Howard Lloyd of Grafton Manor, Bromsgrove, Worcestershire, a member of the Lloyds banking family. He was educated at Uppingham School, after which, in 1894, he attended the Mason Science College in Birmingham, and for a time undertook private study in Vienna. From 1897 to 1899 he was apprenticed as a pattern-maker in Rugby with the engineering firm Willans and Robinson. In 1899 he joined the office of F. H. Medhurst, an electrical engineer, and in 1901 he became a member of the Institution of Civil Engineers.

Lloyd became a director of the steel producers F. H. Lloyd and Co, owned by relations, but his principal business post was as chairman of N. Hingley & Sons Ltd, manufacturer of ship's cables, anchors and other equipment; he held the position from 1918, becoming the company's president in 1961. He was also a director of Lloyds Bank, the National Bank of Scotland and the Great Western Railway. In 1909 he married Phyllis Gretchen, daughter of the painter Sir Ernest Waterlow; they had one daughter.

A Conservative, Lloyd served two terms as Member of Parliament for Dudley. He was first elected at the general election of 1922, and won again, with a much-reduced majority in 1923 and 1924. He lost the seat in 1929. His second term was from July 1941, when he held the seat for the Conservatives after the sitting member, Dudley Joel, was killed on active service. Lloyd retired in 1945 and did not contest the seat in that year's general election. In the House of Commons he concentrated on industry, Midlands affairs, and the welfare of personnel in the armed forces.

Away from parliament, Lloyd became President of the National Federation of Iron and Steel Manufacturers in 1925 and High Sheriff of Worcestershire in 1935. He was a member of the United Kingdom Sugar Industry Inquiry Committee from 1934–35, and submitted a minority report, dissenting from his colleagues' recommendation that public subsidy of sugar beet production should be discontinued. In 1959, when he was eighty-two, he received the Freedom of the County Borough of Dudley.

Lloyd died at his home near Stourbridge at the age of eighty-six.

== Notes ==
Parliament of the United Kingdom
Preceded by James Wilson	Member of Parliament for Dudley; 1922 – 1929	Succeeded by Oliver Baldwin
Preceded by Dudley Joel	Member of Parliament for Dudley; 1941 – 1945	Succeeded by George Wigg
Honorary titles
Preceded by William Harcourt Webb	High Sheriff of Worcestershire; 1935 – 1936	Succeeded by Reginald Seymour Brinton
