= Alfred Paget Hedges =

British Liberal Party politician and cigarette manufacturer

Member of Parliament for Tunbridge
- In office 12 January 1906 – 15 January 1910
- Preceded by: Arthur Griffith-Boscawen
- Succeeded by: Herbert Spender-Clay

Personal details
- Born: 30 December 1867
- Died: 17 April 1929 (aged 61)
- Party: Liberal

Alfred Paget Hedges (30 December 1867 – 17 April 1929), was a British Liberal Party politician and cigarette manufacturer.

== Background ==
He was the second son of William Hedges of Ealing, the co-founder of Benson & Hedges Ltd. He was educated at Milton, Kent. He married Florence Hicks of Gerrans, Cornwall. They had three sons. He was an ardent Methodist.

== Business career ==
He succeeded his father in his tobacco business in 1885 and immediately became the sole proprietor. He had business connections in London, New York and Montreal.

== Political career ==
He was Liberal MP for the Tunbridge Division of Kent from 1906 to 1910. He was elected at the first attempt, gaining the seat from the Conservatives at the 1906 General Election. On 18 February 1908, he instituted a debate on local taxation, and after extensive lobbying for the readjustment of taxes in the winter of 1908–9, he still voted against the government over rating reform in February 1909. He was defeated by the Conservatives at the following general election in January 1910;

General election January 1910 Electorate 17,116
Party	Candidate	Votes	%	±%
Conservative	Herbert Henry Spender-Clay	9,240	60.5	+15.4
Liberal	Alfred Paget Hedges	6,030	39.5	−15.4
Majority		3,210	21.0	30.8
Turnout			89.2	+5.0
Conservative gain from Liberal		Swing	+15.4	

He served as a Justice of the Peace in Kent.

== Sources ==
- Who Was Who
- British parliamentary election results 1885–1918, Craig, F. W. S.

Parliament of the United Kingdom
Preceded by Arthur Griffith-Boscawen	Member of Parliament for Tunbridge; 1906 – January 1910	Succeeded by Herbert Spender-Clay
