= Philip Nichols (diplomat) =

English diplomat

Sir Philip Nichols KCMG MC
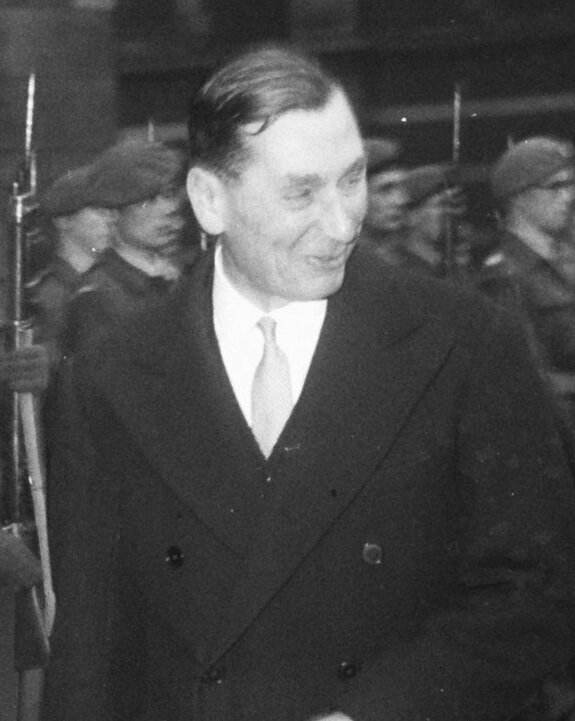
- Philip Nichols in December 1951

UK Ambassador to the Netherlands
- In office 1948–1952
- Monarch: George VI
- Preceded by: Sir Nevile Bland
- Succeeded by: Sir Nevile Butler

UK Ambassador to Czechoslovakia
- In office 1941–1947
- Preceded by: Frank Roberts (as chargé d'affaires)
- Succeeded by: Sir Pierson Dixon

Personal details
- Born: Philip Bouverie Bowyer Nichols; 7 September 1894
- Died: 6 December 1962 (aged 68) London, England
- Spouse: Phyllis Mary Spender-Clay (m. 1932)
- Children: 4
- Parent(s): Bowyer Nichols; Catherine Bouverie-Pusey
- Education: Winchester College
- Alma mater: Balliol College, Oxford

Sir Philip Bouverie Bowyer Nichols KCMG MC (7 September 1894 – 6 December 1962) was an English diplomat who served as Ambassador to Czechoslovakia and the Netherlands

== Early life ==
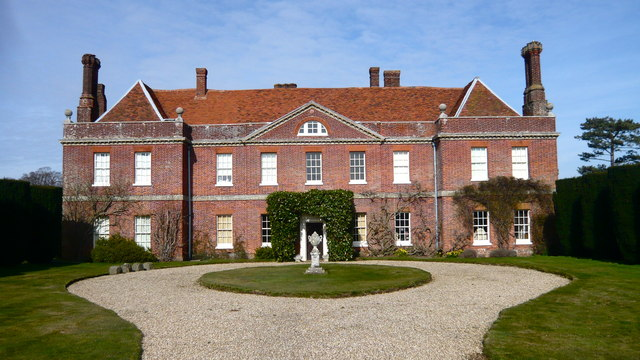
Lawford Hall

Nichols was born on 7 September 1894. He was the younger son of Catherine Louisa Bouverie-Pusey and the poet and artist John Bowyer Buchanan Nichols of Lawford Hall, Essex. Among his siblings was Robert Nichols, poet and dramatist and sisters, Irene, who married Sir George Gater, and Anne, who married Henry Strauss, 1st Baron Conesford.

His paternal grandfather was the editor and writer Francis Morgan Nichols, and was paternally descended from the printer and writer John Bowyer Nichols, author of Literary Anecdotes of the Eighteenth Century. His maternal grandparents were Capt. Edward Bouverie-Pusey (a grandson of Hon. Philip Bouverie-Pusey) and Esther Elliot Hales (a daughter of Rev. Richard Hales).

Nichols was educated at Eton and Balliol College, Oxford.

== Career ==
Nichols "served for two years in New Zealand giving advice and helping train a diplomatic service there. He was ambassador to the Czechoslovak government-in-exile" in London during World War II, and went to Prague in 1945 to "continue his duties." In 1948, he was appointed Ambassador to the Netherlands, serving until his retirement late in 1951.

== Personal life ==
On 6 February 1932, at the age of 38, was married to Phyllis Mary Spender-Clay (1905–1972) in Dormansland. Phyllis was the eldest daughter of Herbert Spender-Clay, MP and the former Pauline Astor. Through her mother, she was a granddaughter of William Waldorf Astor, 1st Viscount Astor. Her younger sister Rachel married Sir David Bowes-Lyon, brother of Queen Elizabeth the Queen Mother. They lived at Lawford Hall, Manningtree, Essex and he was interested in "forestry, farming, opera and ballet." Together, they were the parents of two daughters and two sons, including:

- Anne Nichols, who married William Charlton, a son of Lancelot Charlton of London and a grandson of Mrs. Percy Byron of New York and Darien in 1959.

Sir Philip died on 6 December 1962 in London at the age of 68 and he was buried at St Mary's, Lawford. His widow died in London on 5 January 1972.

Diplomatic posts
Preceded by Sir Nevile Bland	Ambassador Extraordinary and Plenipotentiary to Her Majesty the Queen of the Netherlands; 1948–1952	Succeeded by Sir Nevile Butler
Preceded by Frank Roberts (as chargé d'affaires)	Ambassador Extraordinary and Plenipotentiary to Czechoslovakia; 1941–1947	Succeeded by Sir Pierson Dixon
