= David Williams (philosopher) =

Welsh philosopher and theologian (1738–1816)

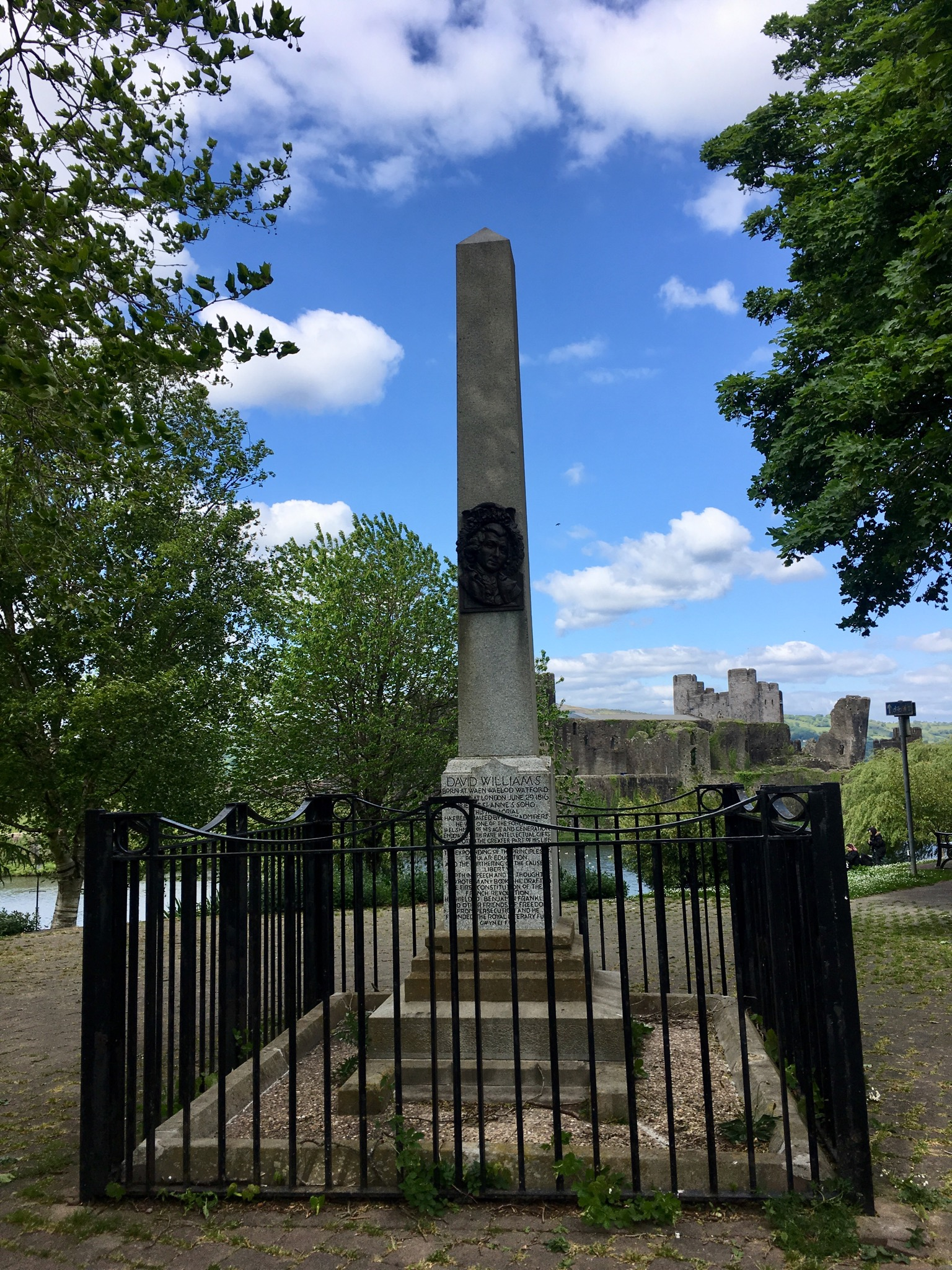
The memorial to David Williams in Caerphilly

David Williams (1738 – 29 June 1816) was a Welsh philosopher of the Enlightenment period. He was an ordained minister, theologian and political polemicist, and was the founder in 1788 of the Royal Literary Fund, of which he had been a proponent since 1773.

== Upbringing ==
Williams was born in a house called Waun Waelod in Watford near Caerphilly. His early education was partly under John Smith, vicar of Eglwysilan, and he went on to a local school run by his namesake, David Williams. His father, William David, was converted to Methodism by Howell Harris; it was at his request that David Williams entered the ministry. Rev. David, an unfortunate speculator in mines and miners' tools, died in 1752; the family consisted of one surviving son and two daughters.

His father on his deathbed made David promise to enter Carmarthen Academy to qualify as a dissenting minister. He studied there, with an exhibition from the London presbyterian board (1753 to Christmas 1757), under Evan Davies, a pupil of John Eames. The academy, hitherto Calvinist, had begun to acquire a heterodox repute. From February 1755 the London congregational board sent no students, owing to the alleged Arianism of Davies's assistant, Samuel Thomas. Davies himself resigned his chair in 1759 under suspicion of Arminianism. Williams' views were unconventional, largely thanks to his four years study at Carmarthen Academy, and he was regarded as a Deist.

== Ordination ==
Williams was ordained in 1758 to the charge of the dissenting congregation at Frome, Somerset, on a stipend of £45. This was the congregation from which Thomas Morgan, the deist, had been dismissed in 1720. Williams's theological views did not prove satisfactory. In 1761 he moved to the Mint meeting, Exeter, founded by James Peirce. Here he was reordained. He prepared A Liturgy on the Principles of the Christian Religion, which is said to have been adopted by his congregation. He soon quarrelled with 'elder members' who objected to his opinions. He retorted by finding fault with their morals. By way of an 'accommodation' he left Exeter about 1769 to take charge of a waning congregation in Southwood Lane, Highgate. To this congregation the father of John Wilkes used to drive in a coach-and-six. In this charge he appears to have remained till 1773. His withdrawal was ascribed by himself to 'the intrigues of a lady', and to no rejection of revelation, 'which he had taken for granted'. His successor, in 1774, was Joseph Towers. His first publication, The Philosopher, in Three Conversations, 1771, (dedicated to Lord Mansfield and Bishop Warburton), containing a project of church reform, drew the attention of John Jebb. With the co-operation of John Lee, a proposal was set on foot for opening a chapel in London with an expurgated prayer-book. Williams was to draw attention to the plan through the public papers. His communications to the Public Advertiser republished as Essays on Public Worship, Patriotism, and Projects of Reformation, 1773, were so deistic in tone as to put an end to the scheme.

== Letter to David Garrick ==
A taste for the drama led to his acquaintance with David Garrick whom he met at the house of a hostess of 'the wits of the time.' With this lady he visited Henry Mossop, the actor, who attributed his misfortunes to Garrick's neglect. Williams wrote to the papers embodying Mossop's view, but the communication was not printed. Three months later he published his keen but truculent Letter to David Garrick, 1772. According to a note by John Philip Kemble in the British Museum copy there was a second edition; Williams, in an advertisement at the end of his Lectures, 1779, vol. i., claims the authorship of the Letter, and affirms that there was 'a surreptitious edition'. Morris, who reprints the Letter with a wrong date (1770), says it was withdrawn from sale. In the Private Correspondence of David Garrick, 1831, is a letter (2 October 1772), signed D. Ws hinting that the published 'Letter' was by 'a young man who is making himself known us a first-rate genius.... His name is Williams. He is intimate at Captain Pye's. Goldsmith knows him, and I have seen him go into Johnson's'. James Boaden, the editor of the 'Correspondence' calls the writer (evidently Williams himself) an 'arrogant boy '. On Mossop's death (18 November 1773) Williams wrote to Garrick, and received a touching reply.

== School and churches ==
In 1773 Williams took a house in Lawrence Street, Chelsea, married Mary Emilia, a woman without a fortune, and set up a school. As the fruit of his ministry he published a volume of Sermons, chiefly upon Religious Hypocrisy (1774). His educational ideas, founded on those of John Amos Comenius, he embodied in his Treatise on Education (1774). Book-learning he subordinated to scientific training based on a first-hand knowledge of facts. He made a novel application of the drunken helot plan, obtaining from a workhouse a 'lying boy' as an object lesson. His school 'prospered beyond his expectations', but the death of his wife (in 1774) for a time unmanned him. He tore himself away, 'leaving his scholars to shift for themselves', and 'secluded himself in a distant country' for 'many months'. He went to Buxton, according to some accounts; he never returned to Chelsea.

In 1774 Benjamin Franklin 'took refuge from a political storm' in Williams's house, and became interested in his method of teaching arithmetic. Franklin joined a small club formed at Chelsea by Williams, the manufacturer Thomas Bentley (partner of Josiah Wedgwood), and James "Athenian" Stuart. At this club Williams broached the scheme of a society for relieving distressed authors, which Franklin did not encourage him to pursue. It was noted at the club that most of the members, though 'good men', yet 'never went to church'. Franklin regretted the want of 'a rational form of devotion'. To supply this, Williams, with aid from Franklin, drew up a form. It was printed six times before it satisfied its sponsors, and was eventually published as A Liturgy on the Universal Principles of Religion and Morality, 1776.

On 7 April 1776, Williams opened for morning service a vacant chapel near Cavendish Square (the building was replaced in 1858 by All Saints, Margaret Street), using his liturgy, and reading lectures, with texts usually from the Bible, sometimes from classic authors. He got 'about a score of auditors', who seem to have been persons of distinction. The opening lecture was published. Copies of the liturgy were sent to Frederick the Great and to Voltaire, who returned appreciative letters in bad French and good English respectively. International botanical travellers Sir Joseph Banks and Daniel Solander 'now and then peeped into the chapel, and got away as fast as they decently could'. Williams's Letter to the Body of Protestant Dissenters, 1777, is a plea for such breadth of toleration as would legally cover such services as his. All the expenses fell on Williams, who was saved from ruin only by the subscription to his Lectures on the Universal Principles and Duties of Religion and Morality 1779. These lectures (critical rather than constructive, and not eloquent, though well written) were read at the chapel in 1776–1777. The experiment is said to have lasted four years, but it is probable that after the second year the services were not held in Margaret Street; they were transferred, on the advice of Robert Melville, to a room in the British Coffee House, Cockspur Street, Melville giving a dinner in Brewer Street after service, 'with excellent Madeira'. The statement by Thomas Somerville that Melville took him, in the period 1779–1785, to the service in 'Portland' Square is no doubt due to a slip of memory. Somerville's further statement that the 'dispersion of his flock' was due to Williams's 'immorality' becoming 'notorious' seems a groundless slander. No hint of it is conveyed in the satiric lampoon Orpheus, Priest of Nature 1781, which affirms, on the contrary, that Williams's principles were too strict for his hearers. The appellation 'Priest of Nature' is said to have been first given him by Franklin; 'Orpheus' ascribes it to 'a Socratic woollen-draper of Covent Garden'. Gregoire affirms that he had it from Williams that a number of his followers passed from deism to atheism.

Williams now supported himself by taking private pupils. After the speech of Sir George Savile on 17 March 1779 in favour of an amendment of the Toleration Act, Williams published a letter on The Nature and Extent of Intellectual Liberty, 1779, claiming that religious toleration should be without restriction. It was answered by Manasseh Dawes. In the same year, and with the same object, he translated and published Voltaire's Treatise on Toleration, Ignorant Philosopher and Commentary on Beccaria. In 1780 he issued A Plan of Association on Constitutional Principles; and on the formation of county associations for parliamentary reform he published his Letters on Political Liberty (1782). This was translated into French the following year by Jacques Pierre Brissot, then in London conducting the Lyceum. Jean-Marie Roland, vicomte de la Platière, a friend of Brissot, visited London in 1784, when Williams made his acquaintance.

Williams's publications at this period include Letters concerning Education 1785; Royal Recollections on a Tour to Cheltenham (anon.), 1788; Lectures on Political Principles 1789; Lectures on Education, 1789; Lessons to a Young Prince (anon.), 1790.

== Literary fund ==
The idea of a "literary fund" to aid "distressed talents" was again suggested by Williams in a club of six persons, formed on the discontinuance of his Sunday lectures (1780), and meeting at the Prince of Wales's coffee-house, Conduit Street. Among its original members, besides Williams, were Captain Thomas Morris, John Gardner (vicar of Battersea), and perhaps the printer John Nichols. Fruitless applications were made after 1783 to William Pitt the Younger (who thought the matter very important), Charles James Fox, Edmund Burke, and Sir Joseph Banks. An advertisement was published (October 1786), 'with no material effect'. The death in a debtors' prison (1 April 1787) of Floyer Sydenham led Williams to press the matter. The club, not being unanimous, was dissolved, and another (of eight members) formed. At its first meeting (spring of 1788) the constitution of the Literary Fund, drawn up by Williams, was adopted, each member subscribing a guinea. An advertisement (10 May 1788) invited further subscriptions. The first general meeting to elect officers was held on Tuesday 18 May 1790 at the Prince of Wales's coffee-house. In the course of twelve years £1,738 was distributed among 105 persons. The society was incorporated 19 May 1818; in 1842 it became the Royal Literary Fund. By the close of the century it possessed an income exceeding £4,000, half from investments, and half from annual contributions.

== Later life ==
At the instance of Dr. Hooper of Pant-y-Goetre and Morgan of Tredegar, Williams undertook to write a history of Monmouthshire, and in 1792 visited the county to collect materials. Shortly afterwards Roland, during his second term of office as minister of the interior, invited Williams to Paris. He went over about August 1792, was made a French citizen, and remained till the execution (21 January 1793) of Louis XVI, a measure which he strongly deprecated. While in Paris he published Observations sur la derniere Constitution de la France, 1793. He brought with him, on his return, a letter to William Grenville, 1st Baron Grenville, from Lebrun, minister of war, who wished to make Williams a medium of communication between the two governments; but no notice was taken of it. An engagement previously entered into for completing the continuation of David Hume's History of England was cancelled, owing to the political odium incurred by his visit to France. His History of Monmouthshire, 1796, with illustrations drawn and partly engraved by his friend Gardner, and a very modest introduction, was considered a standard work on the subject; unfortunately it has no index.

After the peace of Amiens (1802) he again visited France. It was surmised that he had been entrusted with some confidential mission by the English government. Before leaving he had published Claims of Literature, 1802, an authorised account of the Literary Fund. On his return he issued one or two anonymous political tracts, showing, it is said, a diminished confidence in revolutionary methods. His authorship of some anonymous publications is doubtful. On internal evidence he is credited with Egeria, 1803, intended as a first volume of a periodical devoted to political economy. His pecuniary resources failed him.

He had suffered from paralytic attacks, and had a severe stroke in 1811, from which time his faculties declined. He was invited to take up his abode in the house of the Literary Fund, 36 Gerrard Street, Soho, and there he remained till his death, regularly attending the society's meetings. At a special meeting of the general committee, held without Williams's knowledge on 25 July 1815, it was resolved to offer him £50 every six months, as evidence of the committee's 'attachment to the first principles of their society'. Only one instalment was paid before his death on 29 June 1816. A second instalment was handed to his niece and housekeeper, Mary Watkins. On 6 July he was buried in St Anne's Church, Soho, where there is a brief inscription to his memory.

His will, dated 16 July 1814, left his papers to his executors, Richard Yates and Thomas Wittingham; his other property went to his niece and housekeeper, Mary Watkins (died 5 February 1845), who moved from Gerrard Street to Lower Sloane Street, and afterwards to King's Road, Chelsea.

A memorial to Williams was erected in 1911 in the park adjoining Caerphilly Castle, now named David Williams Park. It was listed Grade II in 1999.

== Works ==
- Treatise on Education (1774)
- A Liturgy on the Universal Principles of Religion and Morality (1776)
- Letters on Political Liberty (1782)
- History of Monmouthshire (1796)
