= Richard Yates =

Richard Yates may refer to:

== People ==
- Richard Yates (actor) (1706–1796), English comic actor
- Richard Yates (antiquary) (1769–1834), English cleric
- Richard Yates Sr. (1815–1873), 13th governor of Illinois (1861–1865), U.S. Senator from Illinois (1865–1871), U.S. Congressman from Illinois (1851–1855), member of Illinois House of Representatives (1842–1845, 1848–1849)
  - Richard Yates Jr. (1860–1936), son of above, 22nd governor of Illinois (1901–1905), U.S. Congressman from Illinois (1919–1933)
- Dick Yates (1921–1976), Welsh footballer
- Richard Yates (novelist) (1926–1992), American novelist and short-story writer
- Richard Yates (athlete) (born 1986), English athlete

== Novels ==
- Richard Yates (novel), 2010 novel by Tao Lin
