= Bowyer Nichols =

English poet and artist

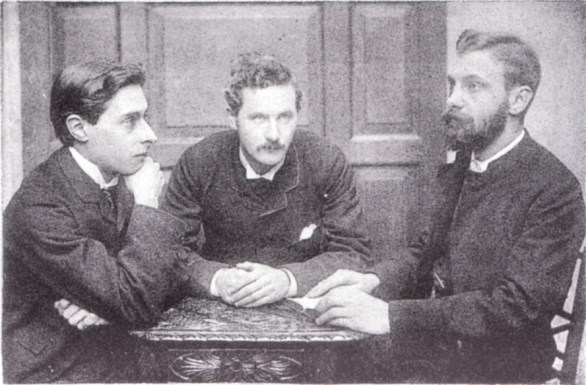
Bowyer Nichols, J. W. Mackail, and H. C. Beeching, by Frederick Hollyer, c. 1882.

John Bowyer Buchanan Nichols (13 November 1859 – 2 June 1939), known as Bowyer Nichols, was an English poet and artist.

== Early life ==
Nichols was the son of Francis Morgan Nichols, an editor and writer, and was paternally descended from the printer and writer John Bowyer Nichols, author of Literary Anecdotes of the Eighteenth Century.

He was educated at Winchester and Balliol College, Oxford.

== Career ==
Nichols, a poet and artist, became a trustee of the Wallace Collection.

== Personal life ==
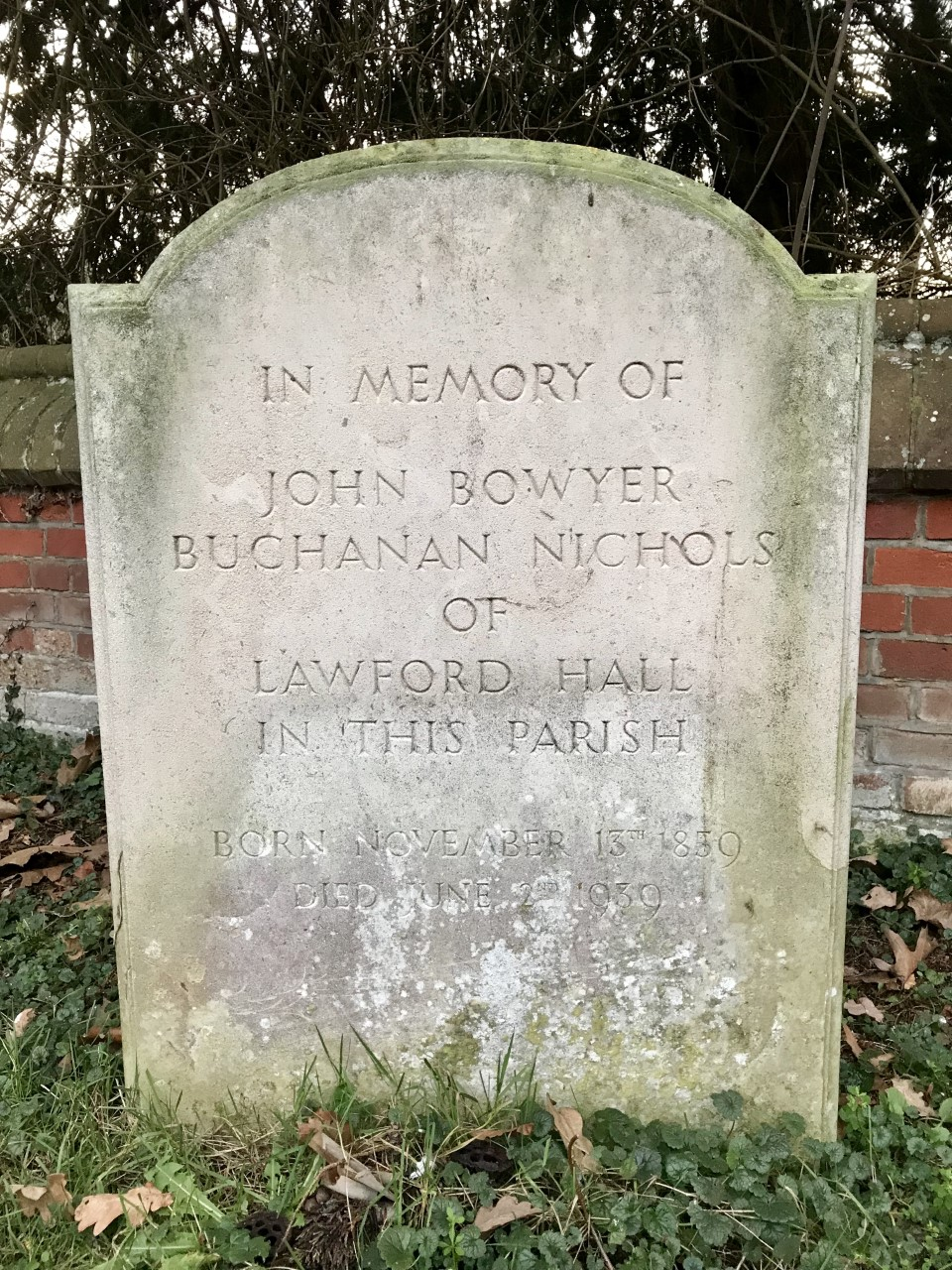
The gravestone of John Bowyer Buchanan Nichols in the churchyard of St Mary's Church, Lawford

On 4 August 1892, Nichols married Catherine Louisa Bouverie-Pusey, a daughter of Captain Edward Bouverie-Pusey (grandson of Hon. Philip Bouverie-Pusey and Lady Lucy Sherard) and Esther Elliot Hales (a daughter of Rev. Richard Cox Hales). Nichols had two sons and two daughters:

- Robert Malise Bowyer Nichols (1893–1944), Great War poet and dramatist who married Norah Denny in 1922.
- Philip Bouverie Bowyer Nichols (1894–1962), a civil servant who married Phyllis Mary Spender-Clay, eldest daughter of Herbert Spender-Clay, MP and the former Pauline Astor (daughter of William Waldorf Astor, 1st Viscount Astor). Phyllis' younger sister, Rachel, married Sir David Bowes-Lyon, brother of Queen Elizabeth the Queen Mother.
- Irene Nichols, who married Sir George Gater in 1926.
- Anne Sadelbia Mary Nichols, who married Henry Strauss, 1st Baron Conesford, in 1927.

Nichols died at Lawford Hall, Manningtree, Essex, aged 79, and is buried in the churchyard of St Mary's Church, Lawford.

== Works ==
- Love in Idleness: A Volume of Poems (1883), with H. C. Beeching and J. W. Mackail
- Love's Looking Glass (1892), with Beeching and Mackail
