= Balliol =

Balliol may refer to:

- House of Balliol, Lords of Baliol and their fief
- Balliol College, Oxford
  - Balliol rhyme, a doggerel verse form with a distinctive meter, associated with Balliol College
- John Balliol (King John of Scotland) (1249–1314)
  - John I de Balliol (1210–1269), his father
  - Edward Balliol (c. 1283–1364), his son, King of Scots
- Roussel de Bailleul (died 1077), Norman adventurer
- Boulton Paul Balliol, a British two-seat training aircraft
