= Frederick Hollyer =

English photographer and engraver (1838–1933)

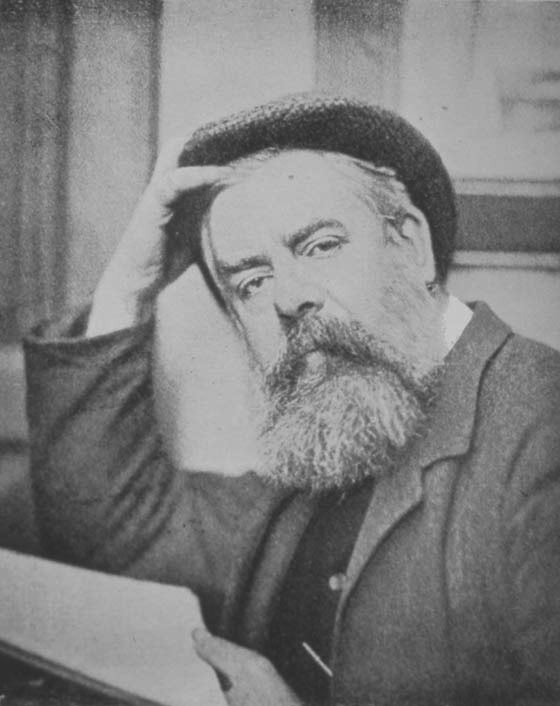
- Hollyer, platinotype self-portrait, c. 1890
- Born: 17 June 1838; Pentonville, England
- Died: 21 November 1933 (aged 95); Blewbury, England
- Known for: Photography

Frederick Hollyer (17 June 1838 – 21 November 1933) was an English photographer and engraver known for his photographic reproductions of paintings and drawings, particularly those of the Pre-Raphaelite Brotherhood, and for portraits of literary and artistic figures of late Victorian and Edwardian London.

== Family ==
Hollyer was the youngest son of Samuel Hollyer (1797–1883), a line engraver, fine art publisher, collector of watercolours, and Deputy Sealer at the Court of Chancery until 1853, when the post was abolished. His brothers Christopher Charles Hollyer (1836–1874), and Samuel Hollyer Jr. (1826–1919) also worked as engravers. Frederick Hollyer's first published works were mezzotint engravings of two paintings by Edwin Landseer published by J. McQueen in 1869.

== Photographic career ==
Hollyer became interested in photography about 1860. He made albumen and carbon prints, but his preferred medium was the platinotype or platinum print process, admired for its permanence and great tonal range. Under the patronage of Frederic Leighton, Hollyer began to photograph paintings and drawings in the 1870s. Artists whose work he published include Edward Burne-Jones, George Frederic Watts, Simeon Solomon, and Dante Gabriel Rossetti. Of his work with the Pre-Raphaelites, The Times noted that

[H]e may be said to have done as much for their popularity by reproducing their work as Ruskin did with the pen. His modest premises in Pembroke Square, Kensington, became a place of pilgrimage for everybody who was in the aesthetic movement. With Burne-Jones, whom he met in the early seventies, and Watts, his collaboration —for it amounted to that—was particularly close. He photographed their work at different stages—the prints often suggesting modifications to the artists—and his collection of negatives must contain some interesting records of early states. Rossetti, Albert Moore, and Sir W.B. Richmond were other artists whose work was made familiar to the public through Hollyer's reproductions. In workmanship he was extremely fastidious, giving personal attention to every stage of the process, so that the final result was not so much a photograph of a painting as a translation of its qualities into photographic terms.

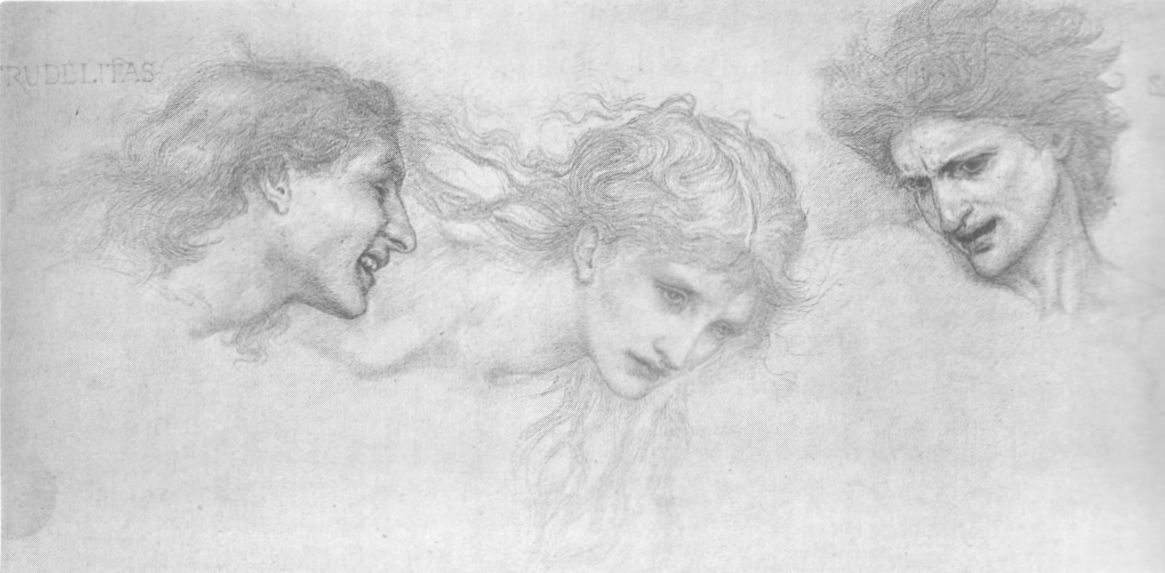
Heads of Despight, Cruelty, and Dame Amoret, Burnes-Jones's study for The Masque of Cupid, from a print by Hollyer.

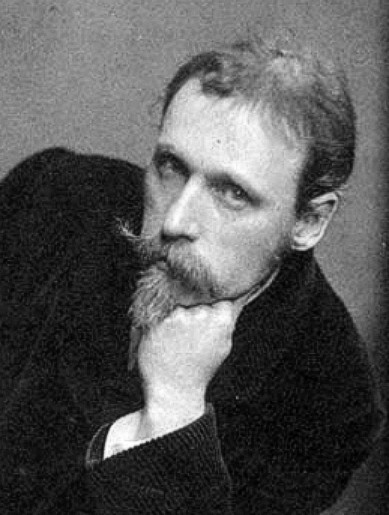
Walter Crane, 1886

Hollyer's photographs of drawings were particularly successful; printed on high-quality paper, they were often mistaken for originals. One of the most popular was a study of three heads by Burne-Jones for The Masque of Cupid.

Hollyer also took studio portraits and specialised in interior and exterior photos of houses. For 30 years, he reserved Mondays for portrait photography in his Pembroke Square studio. His sitters included the artists Walter Crane, William Morris, G. F. Watts, and Burne-Jones; the writers John Ruskin, H. G. Wells, and George Bernard Shaw; and the actresses Mrs Patrick Campbell and Ellen Terry. Hollyer eschewed the formal poses of most studio portraiture of his day; in an 1899 interview in The Photogram he said

The one thing needful for photographers, if they are ever to take a position as artists, is general culture, which includes the study of the work of artists of all other classes. If every photographer would make a real study, for two or three years, of the hands of his sitters, portraiture would take an immense step forward. But the photographer must cease attempting to pose hands and make them pose themselves by giving them some congenial occupation . . The photographer who has met a man half a dozen times should know with absolute certainty what is the most characteristic pose and lighting for his face . . . I think it would be a most useful thing, even from the business point of view, if every photographer would resolve that for every negative made for profit there should be another made for love. The greatest good of the Photographic Salon has been in showing that the best professional photographers could do some of the finest amateur work

Hollyer did much to establish photography as a fine art in England. His work was widely acclaimed in his own day; in 1897, a critic in The Studio lamented:

Mr. Hollyer, in sheer good nature, ought to exhibit a failure now and then, if only to encourage critics. As it is, year by year, they have to ring changes on the most eulogistic adjectives, and feel all the time that they are not doing more than scant justice to memorable work."

Hollyer joined the Royal Photographic Society 1865 and became a Fellow in 1895, but was also involved in The Linked Ring, a society formed in to support pictorialism in opposition to the Photographic Society. He was a member of the Solar Club and became one of the Founder Members of the Professional Photographers' Association in 1901.

== Later life ==
Frederick Hollyer married Mary Anne Armstrong (1838–1913). Their eldest son Frederick Thomas Hollyer (1870–1952) worked with his father and took over the studio when the elder Hollyer retired in 1913. Frederick Hollyer died 21 November 1933 at his eldest son's home in Blewbury (then part of Berkshire), aged 95.

Today, Hollyer is remembered chiefly for his photographs of Burne-Jones, William Morris, and their circle.

== Gallery ==
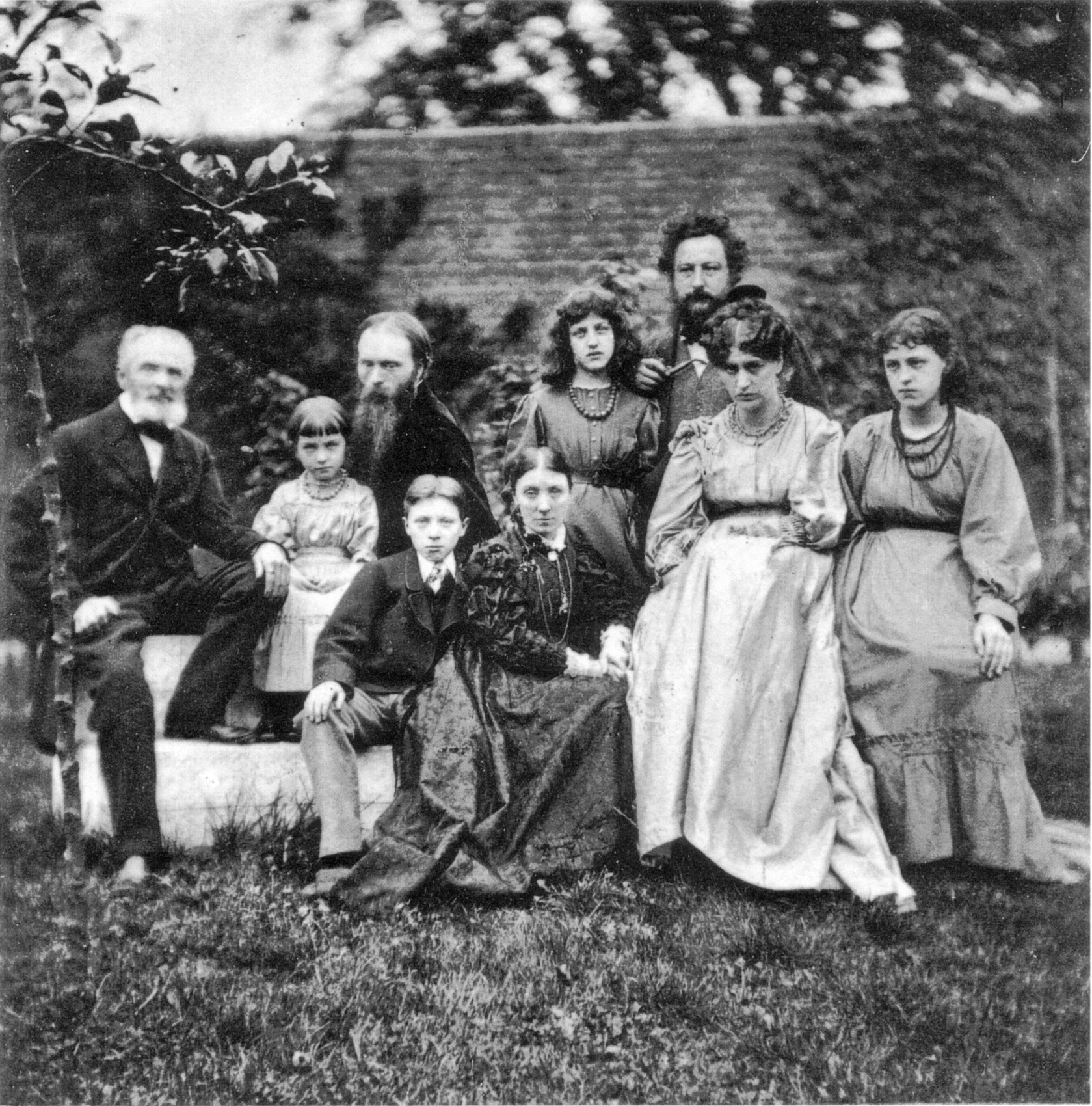
Burne-Jones and Morris families, 1874

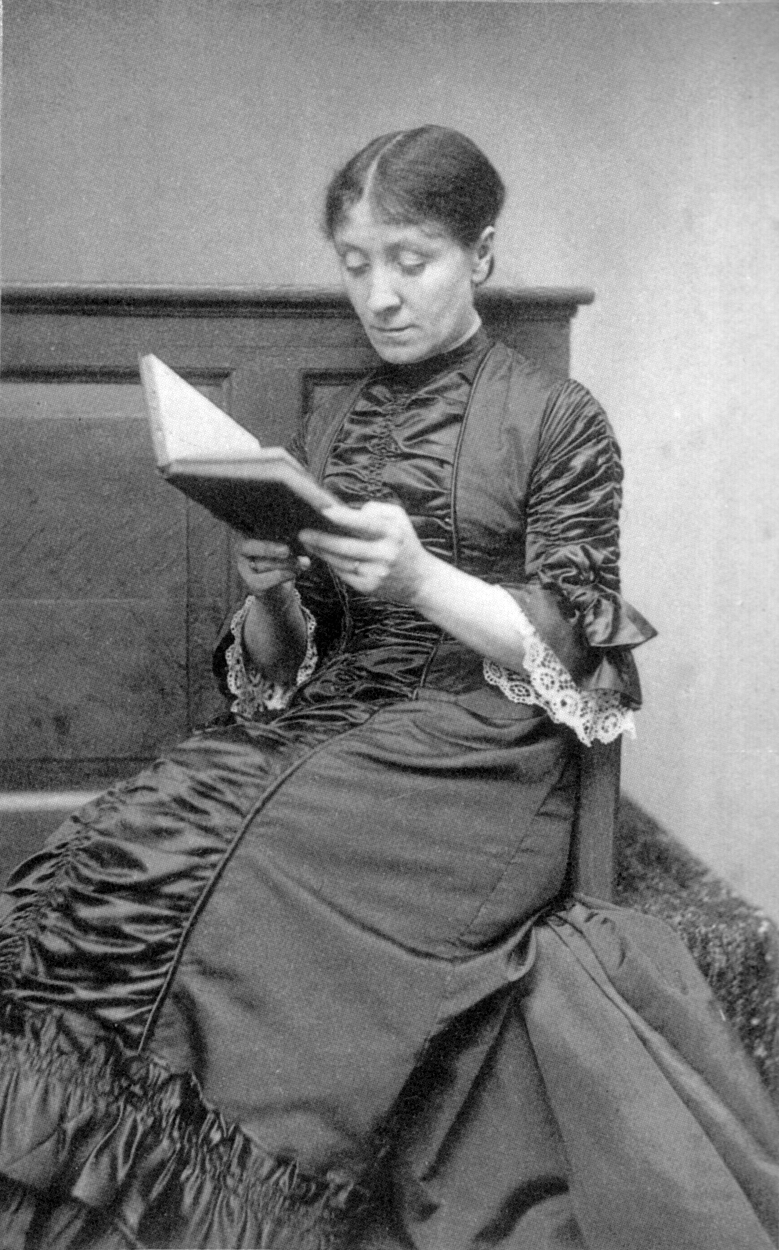
Georgiana Burne-Jones, c. 1882

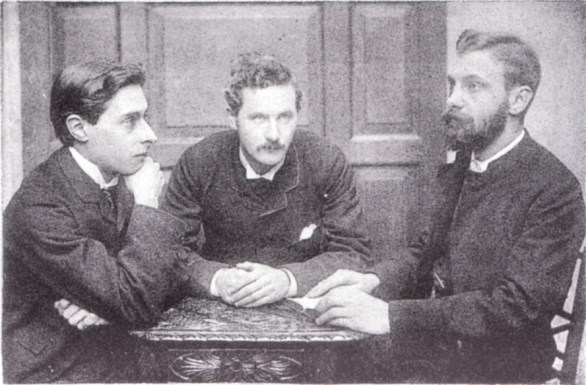
Bowyer Nichols, J. W. Mackail, and H. C. Beeching, c. 1882

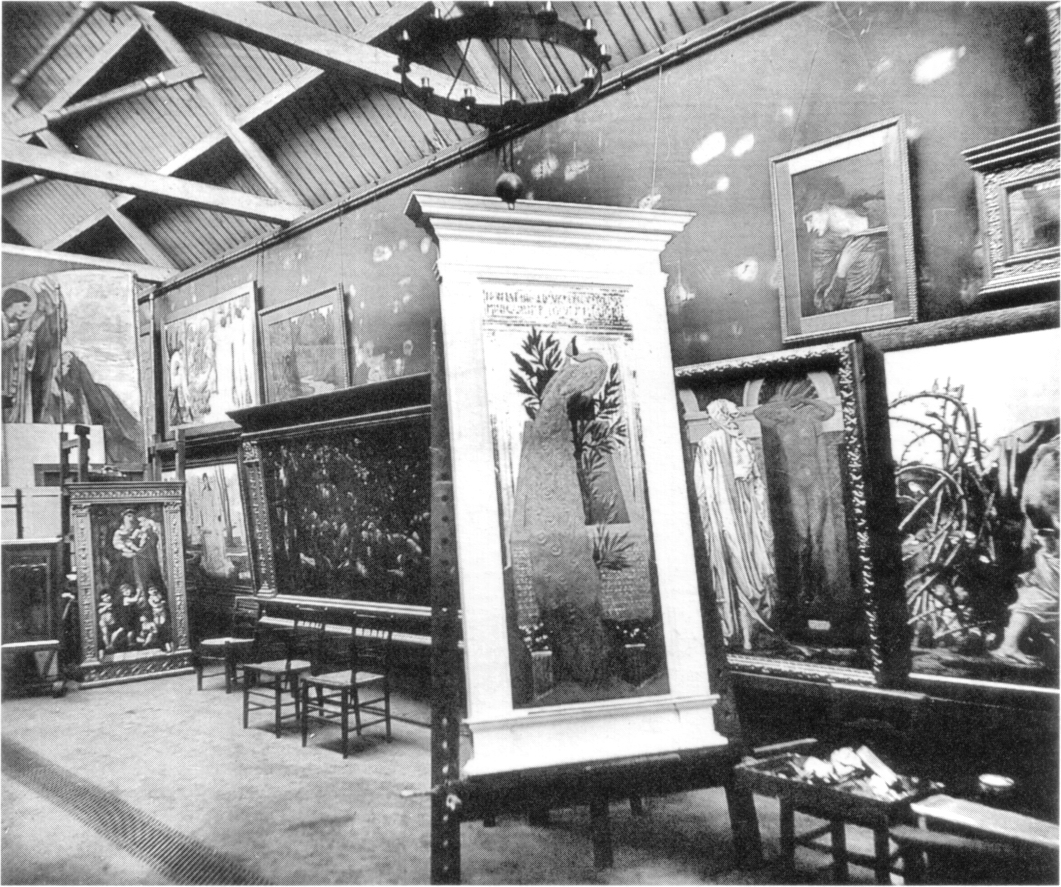
Burne-Jones's studio, 1887

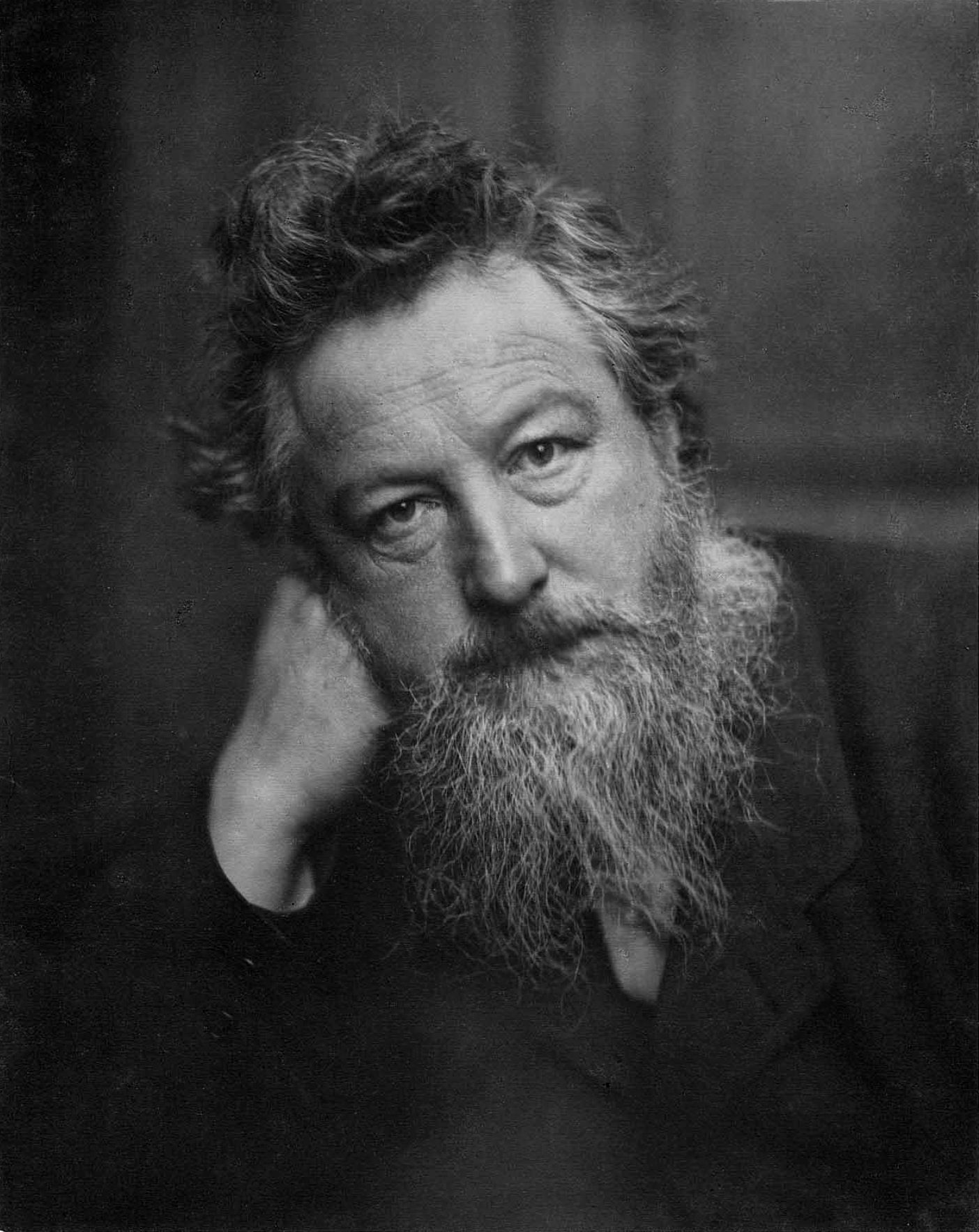
William Morris, c. 1887

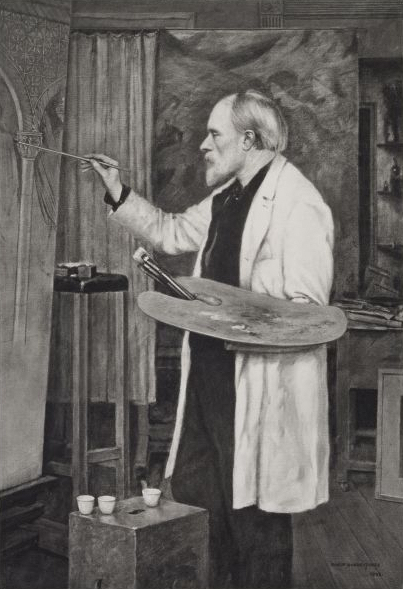
Photogravure of portrait of Burne-Jones by his son Philip

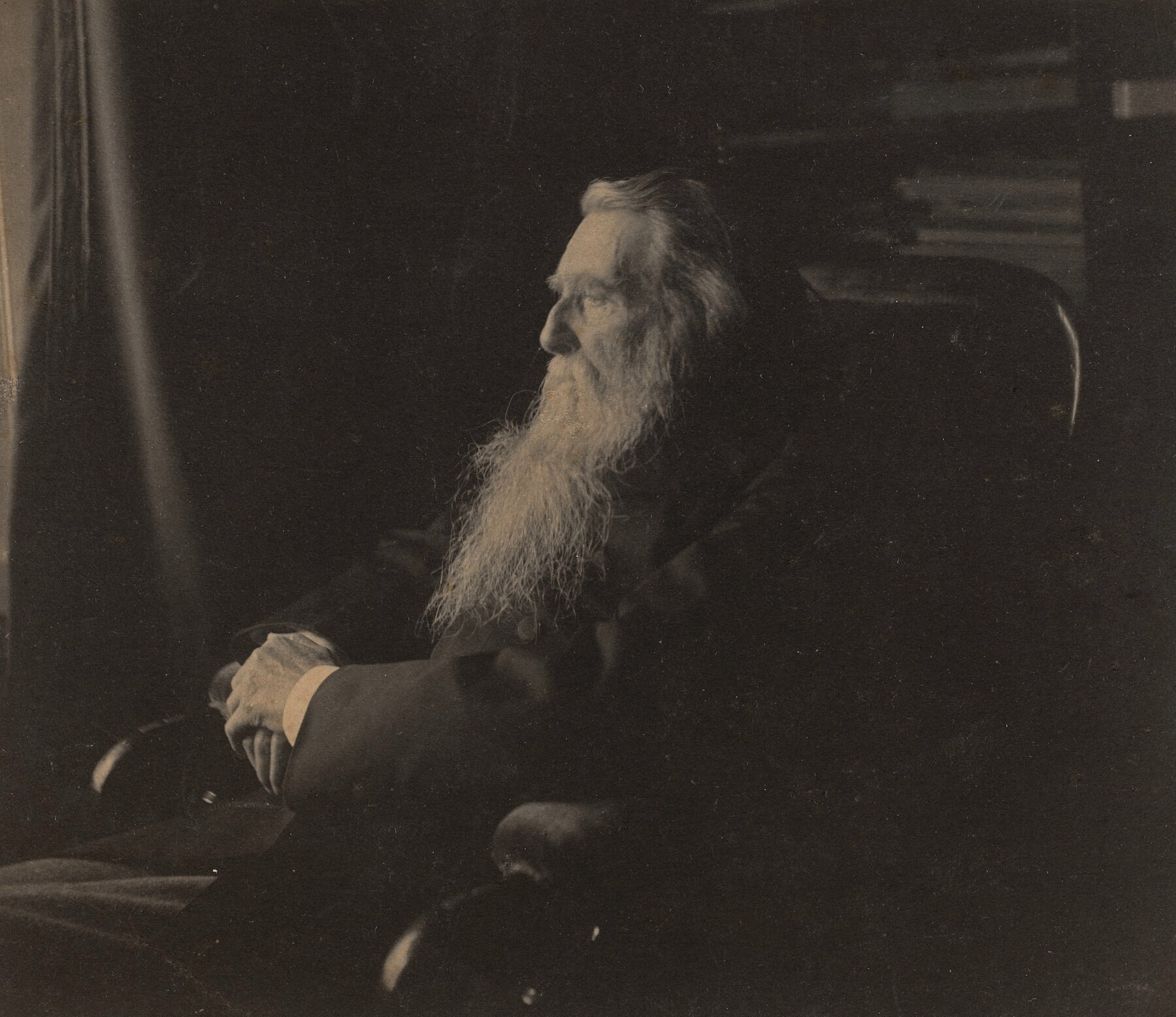
John Ruskin, 1894
