= John Robertson (Canadian politician) =

Canadian politician

The Honourable John Robertson
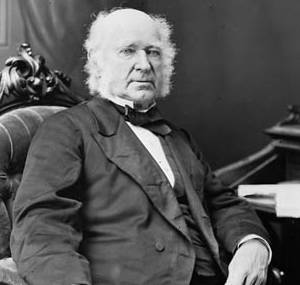

10th Mayor of Saint John, New Brunswick
- In office 1836–1837
- Preceded by: William H. Street
- Succeeded by: Robert F. Hazen

Personal details
- Born: 1799
- Died: August 3, 1876 (aged 76–77) Manningtree, Essex, England

John Robertson (1799 – August 3, 1876) was a Scottish-born businessman and political figure in New Brunswick. He served as a member of the Senate of Canada from 1867 to 1876.

He was born in Perthshire and married Sophia Dobie. In 1817, he came to New Brunswick where he worked first as a clerk for his uncle and then for Thomas Millidge. He later became a partner in the business after Millidge retired. He also owned a sawmill and was president of the Victoria Coal Mining Company. In 1836, he was elected mayor of Saint John. Robertson served as a member of the Legislative Council of New Brunswick from 1837 to 1867. He was also a magistrate and was a member of the Chamber of Commerce, serving as its president for several years. Robertson was a member of the local militia, becoming lieutenant-colonel. While still a member of the Senate, Robertson retired to England and died in office in Essex. He is buried in the churchyard of St Mary's Church, Lawford, Essex.

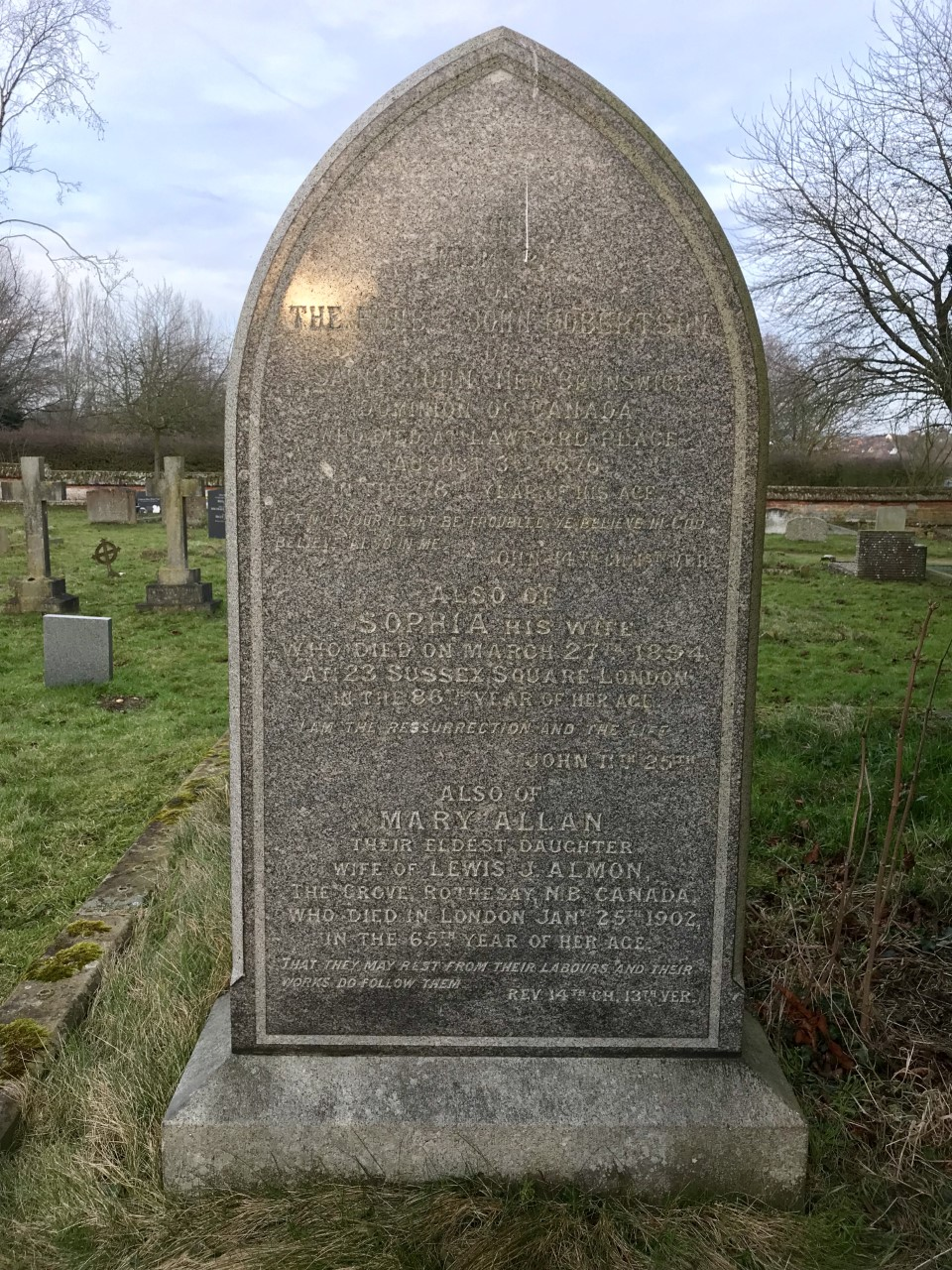
The grave of John Robertson in the churchyard of St Mary's Church, Lawford
