= St Mary's Church, Lawford =

Coordinates: 51.9434°N 1.0380°E

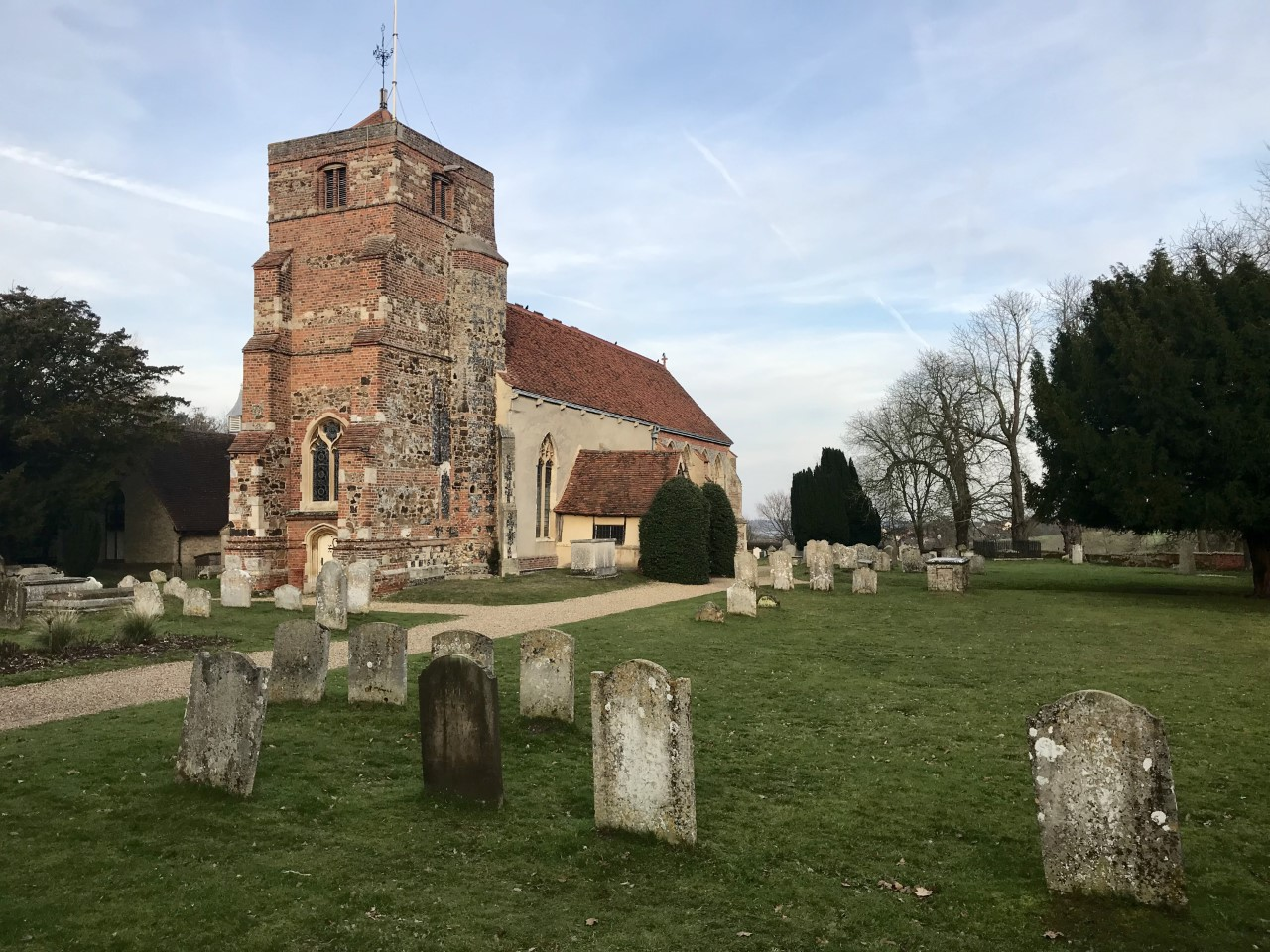
- St Mary's Church, Lawford, from the west

- Location in Essex
- OS grid reference: TM 089,316
- Location: Church Hill, Lawford, Essex
- Country: England
- Denomination: Anglican
- Website: St Mary, Lawford

History
- Status: Parish church
- Dedication: Saint Mary the Virgin

Architecture
- Functional status: Active
- Heritage designation: Grade I
- Designated: 17 November 1966
- Architectural type: Church
- Style: Gothic

Specifications
- Materials: Flint, septaria and brick, with limestone dressings Tiled roof

Administration
- Diocese: Chelmsford
- Archdeaconry: Colchester
- Deanery: Harwich
- Parish: Lawford

Clergy
- Priest(s): Revd Gill Moore, Revd Sally Morris

St Mary's Church stands on Church Hill, Lawford, Essex, England. It is an active Anglican parish church in the deanery of Harwich, the archdeaconry of Colchester, and the diocese of Chelmsford. The church is recorded in the National Heritage List for England as a designated Grade I listed building.

== History ==
The oldest fabric in the church is in the south wall of the nave, dating from 1200 or earlier. The chancel, the south porch and the first tower were built in 1340. The tower was rebuilt in the 16th century, and again in the following century. In 1826 the north wall of the nave and the north aisle were added. In 1853, when the rector was Revd Charles Merivale (later the Dean of Ely), the interior of the chancel was restored by the Lancaster architect E. G. Paley.^{[A]} The nave was restored in 1864, followed by the chancel walls in 1887. In 1944 the east window was damaged by a bomb. In 1991 an extension was made to the north of the church to house a vestry and meeting rooms, and in 2009 the roof and tower were repaired and parts of the interior of the church were modernised.

== Architecture ==
The church is constructed in flint, septaria and brick, with limestone dressings and a tiled roof. The plan consists of a three-bay nave with a south porch, a north aisle, a chancel, a north vestry, and a west tower with a stair turret on the southeast. In the chancel are a 14th-century piscina and a triple sedilia. The octagonal pulpit dates from about 1906. In 1906 a two-manual pipe organ made by Norman and Beard was installed. This was replaced by an electronic organ made by Copeman Hart in 2005. There is a ring of three bells, dated 1667, 1714, and 1907.

== External features ==
The churchyard contains the graves of the war poet Robert Nichols and his father John Bowyer Buchanan Nichols, also a poet. The grave of the Canadian politician John Robertson also lies in the churchyard, as do the war graves of a soldier and two airmen of the Second World War.

== See also ==
- List of works by Sharpe and Paley

== Notes ==
^{A} It was unusual for Paley to accept a commission so far from his office. Brandwood et al. consider that the introduction must have been made by Paley's previous partner in the practice, Edmund Sharpe, who had been an undergraduate at St John's College, Cambridge, at the same time as Merivale, and both men rowed for the college.
