= John William Mackail =

Scottish academic and reformer of the British education system

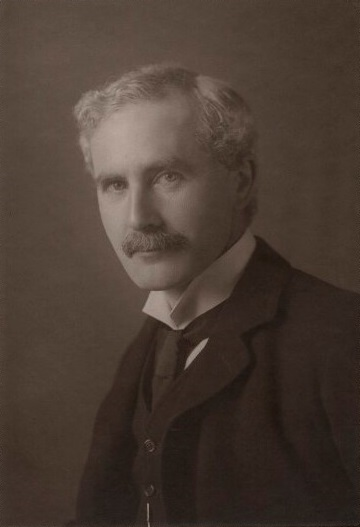
- Born: 26 August 1859; Ascog, Bute, Scotland
- Died: 13 December 1945 (aged 86); London, England
- Spouse: Margaret Burne-Jones
- Children: 3

Academic background
- Education: Ayr Academy
- Alma mater: Edinburgh University; Balliol College, Oxford

Academic work
- Discipline: Classics; Poetry

John William Mackail OM FBA (26 August 1859 – 13 December 1945) was a Scottish academic of the University of Oxford and reformer of the British education system.

He is most often remembered as a scholar of Virgil and as the official biographer of the socialist artist William Morris, of whom he was a friend.

Mackail was Oxford Professor of Poetry from 1906 to 1911, and president of the British Academy from 1932 to 1936.

== Life ==
Mackail was born in Ascog on Bute, the second child and only son of the Rev. John Mackail, of the Free Church, and Louisa Irving, who was the youngest daughter of Aglionby Ross Carson FRSE, who was the rector of Edinburgh High School.

=== Academic career ===
Mackail was educated at Ayr Academy; at Edinburgh University, from 1874 to 1877; and at Balliol College, Oxford, as Warner Exhibitioner, from 1877. At Oxford, he took first classes in classical moderations (1879) and literae humaniores ('Greats') in 1881, and he also obtained the Hertford (1880), Ireland (1880), Newdigate (1881), Craven (1882) and Derby (1884) Prizes. He was elected to a Balliol fellowship in 1882.

At Oxford Mackail contributed, alongside Cecil Spring Rice, to the composition of a famous sardonic doggerel about George Nathaniel Curzon, later Lord Curzon, their contemporary at Balliol, that was published in The Masque of Balliol.

In 1884, Mackail accepted a post in the Education Department of the Privy Council (later the Board of Education), of which he became Assistant Secretary in 1903. In this position, made an important contribution to the system of secondary education established by the 1902 Education Act, and to the organisation of a system of voluntary inspection for the public schools. He retired from office in 1919.

Mackail was the official biographer of the socialist artist William Morris, of whom he was a close friend. He also published works on Virgil; the Latin poets; the Icelandic sagas; Shakespeare; and Jesus.

Mackail was Oxford Professor of Poetry (1906–11), president of the British Academy (1932–36), and president of the Classical Association (1923–24). He was appointed to the Order of Merit in 1935.

=== Private life ===
Mackail married Margaret Burne-Jones (1866–1953), who was the only daughter of artist and designer Edward Burne-Jones. They lived in Kensington, and later in Holland Park. He died in London and was cremated at Golders Green Crematorium on 17 December 1945.

The couple's elder daughter, Angela Margaret, and their son, Denis George, are better known as the novelists Angela Thirkell and Denis Mackail. The couple also had a younger daughter, Clare Mackail, who was the subject of a 2020 biography Barely Clare: the Little-Known Life of Clare Mackail by Tim McGee.

== Collections ==
University College London Special Collections holds letters to Mackail about R.J. Cholmeley's translation of Theocritus' Idylls.

== Works ==
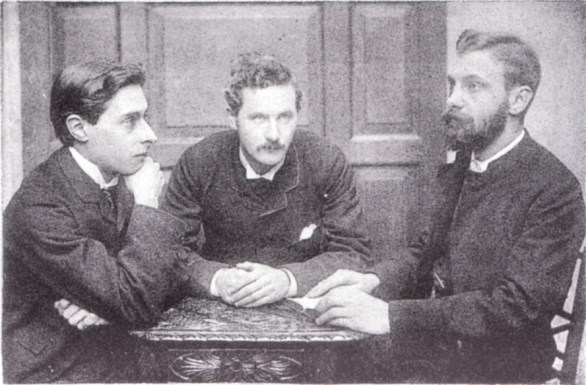
Bowyer Nichols, J. W. Mackail, and H. C. Beeching, by Frederick Hollyer, c. 1882.

- Love in Idleness: A Volume of Poems (1883) anonymous, with H. C. Beeching and J. B. B. Nichols
- The Aeneid of Virgil (1885) translator
- Virgil Eclogues and Georgics (1889)
- Select Epigrams From The Greek Anthology (1890)
- Love's Looking Glass (1892) with H. C. Beeching and J. B. B. Nichols
- Biblia Innocentium: Being the Story of God's Chosen People Before the Coming of Our Lord Jesus Christ Upon Earth, Written Anew for Children (Kelmscott Press, 1892)
- Latin Literature (1895); at least 40 editions
- The Georgics of Virgil (1899)
- The Life of William Morris, two volumes (1899); Vol. I Vol. II
- The Little Bible (1900)
- William Morris: An Address Delivered at Kelmscott House Hammersmith Socialist Society (1902)
- Addresses, four volumes (1902/5)
- The Parting of the Ways: An Address (1903) given in the William Morris Labour Church at Leek, 5 October 1902
- Socialism and Politics: An Address and a Programme (1903)
- Homer: An Address Delivered on Behalf of the Independent Labour Party (1905)
- The Sayings of the Lord Jesus Christ (1905)
- William Morris and His Circle (1907)
- The Hundred Best Poems in the Latin Language (1908)
- The Springs of Helicon: A Study of the Progress of English Poetry from Chaucer to Milton (1909)
- Swinburne (1909) University of Oxford lecture 30 April 1909.
- Lectures on Greek Poetry (1910)
- Pervigilium Veneris (1911) editor and translator
- Lectures on Poetry (1914)
- Russia's Gift to the World (1915)
- The Study of Poetry (1915) inauguration of the Rice Institute
- "Shakespeare after Three Hundred Years". Proceedings of the British Academy, 1915–1916. 7: 319–338. 1976. Annual Shakespeare Lecture of the British Academy (1916)
- Penelope in the Odyssey (1916)
- Pope (1919) Leslie Stephen Lecture, University of Cambridge 10 May 1919
- The Hundred Best Poems (lyrical) (1920)
- Virgil and His Meaning to the World of To-day (1922)
- Shakespeare (1923) Inaugural Address to the Australian English Association
- Bentley's Milton (1924) British Academy Warton Lecture
- The Pilgrim's Progress (1924) Royal Institution Lecture 14 March 1924
- Life and Letters of George Wyndham (2 vols.) (1924) with Guy Wyndham
- Classical Studies (1925)
- James Leigh Strachan-Davidson, Master of Balliol. A Memoir (Oxford: Clarendon Press, 1925)
- Studies of English Poets (1926)
- Largeness in Literature (1930)
- The Approach to Shakespeare (1930)
- Coleridge's Literary Criticism (1931)
- Virgil (1931) Henriette Hertz Trust Lecture of the British Academy.
- The Odyssey (1932)
- Virgil's Work: The Aeneid, Eclogues, Georgics (1934)
- Studies in Humanism (1938)
- Poems by Bowyer Nichols (1943)
- An Introduction to Virgil's Aeneid (1946)
- Selections from the Georgics of Virgil (1948)
- Latin Literature (1962) Harry C. Schnur editor
- The Holy Bible, containing the Old and New Testaments (1897)

== See also ==
- English translations of Homer: John William Mackail
