= Balliol rhyme =

Doggerel verse quatrain with two rhyming couplets

A Balliol rhyme is a doggerel verse form with a distinctive metre. It is a quatrain, having two rhyming couplets (rhyme scheme $\mathrm{AABB}$), each line having four beats. They are written in the voice of the named subject and elaborate on that person's character, exploits or predilections.

The form is associated with, and takes its name from, Balliol College, Oxford.

== Origins ==
In 1880, seven undergraduates of Balliol published 40 quatrains of doggerel lampooning various members of the college under the title The Masque of B–ll––l, now better known as The Balliol Masque, in a format that came to be called the "Balliol rhyme". The college authorities suppressed the publication fiercely. The verses were inspired by the conventions of traditional mummers' plays (at their peak of popularity in the late 19th century), in which the dialogue took the form of simple verses, and in which characters introduced themselves on first entrance with some such formula as: "Here comes I a Turkish Knight / Come from the Turkish land to fight".

== Examples ==
About Benjamin Jowett, Master of Balliol (from The Masque of B-ll--l):

First come I. My name is J–w–tt.
There's no knowledge but I know it.
I am Master of this College,
What I don't know isn't knowledge.

About George Nathaniel Curzon:

My name is George Nathaniel Curzon,
I am a most superior person.
My face is pink, my hair is sleek,
I dine at Blenheim once a week.

About John William Mackail:

I am tall and rather stately
And I care not very greatly
What you say, or what you do.
I'm Mackail – and who are you?

== See also ==
- Clerihew

== Bibliography ==
- Hiscock, Walter George, ed. (1939). The Balliol Rhymes. Oxford: Blackwell.
- Venn, J.A.; Bailey, Cyril (30 August 1954). "Balliol Rhymes [Letters to the Editor]". The Times. p. 7. (subscription required)
