= Henry Beeching =

English clergyman and writer (1859–1919)

The Very Reverend Henry Charles Beeching
- Dean of Norwich
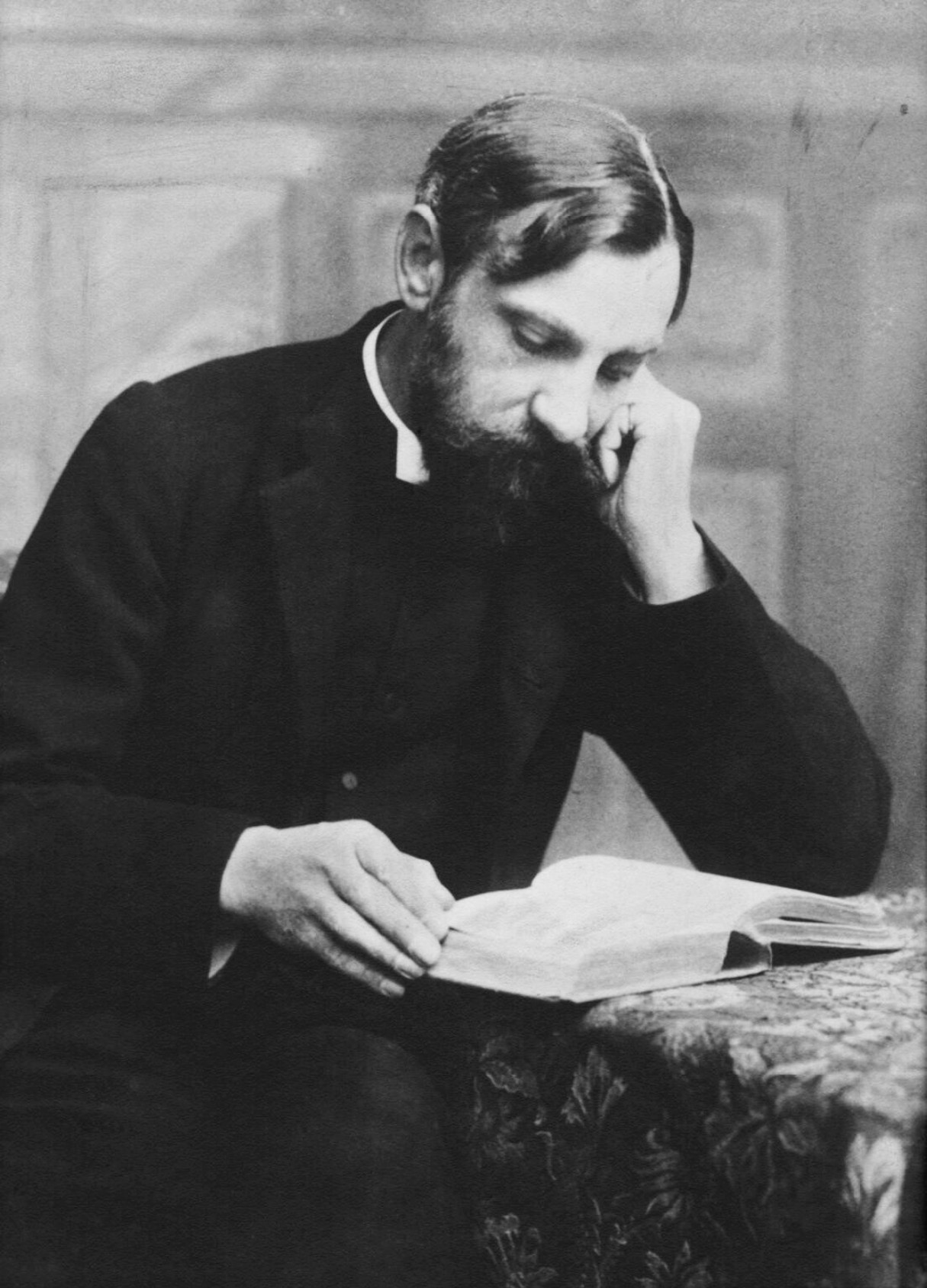
- Henry Charles Beeching, 1900s–1910s
- Province: Canterbury
- Diocese: Norwich

Personal details
- Born: 15 May 1859
- Died: 25 February 1919 (aged 59)
- Denomination: Anglican
- Education: Balliol College, Oxford

Henry Charles Beeching (15 May 1859 – 25 February 1919) was a British clergyman, writer and poet, who was Dean of Norwich from 1911 to 1919.

== Biography ==
H. C. Beeching was born on 15 May 1859 in Sussex, the son of J. P. G. Beeching of Bexhill. He was educated at the City of London School and at Balliol College, Oxford. He took holy orders in 1882, and began work in a Liverpool parish at Mossley Hill. He was Rector of Yattendon from 1885 to 1900; Clark Lecturer at Trinity College, Cambridge in 1900; professor of Pastoral Theology at King's College London from 1900 to 1903; Chaplain of Lincoln's Inn from 1900 to 1903; Canon of Westminster Abbey from October 1902 until 1911 and Dean of Norwich from 1911 until his death. He wrote a book on Francis Atterbury. To him is attributed the popular epigram on Benjamin Jowett:

First come I; my name is Jowett.
There's no knowledge but I know it.
I am master of this college:
What I don't know isn't knowledge.

This is the first verse of The Masque of B-ll—l (1880), a scurrilous undergraduate production in 40 verses satirising Balliol figures. It was suppressed at the time. Later research has given Beeching credit for 19 of the verses.

== Works ==
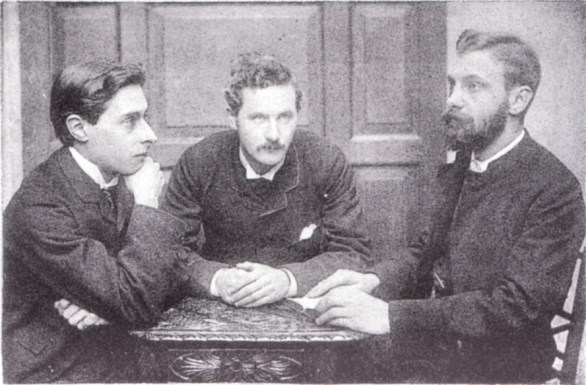
- Beeching (right) with Bowyer Nichols and J. W. Mackail, by Frederick Hollyer, c. 1882
  Love in Idleness: A Volume of Poems (1883) with J. W. Mackail and J. B. B. Nichols
- Love's Looking Glass (1892) with J. W. Mackail and J. B. B. Nichols
- A Paradise of English Poetry (1893), an anthology of English poets
- Pages from a Private Diary (1898), originally published anonymously
- "The Character of Shakespeare". Proceedings of the British Academy, 1917–1918. 8: 157–179.

== Bibliography ==
- "Beeching, Henry Charles (1859-1919)", Hugh Chisholm (ed.) Encyclopædia Britannica. 3 (11th ed.). Cambridge University Press, 1908.
- "Beeching, Henry Charles (1859-1919)", H. C. G. Matthew (ed.) Oxford Dictionary of National Biography. Oxford University Press, 2004.
