= John Bowyer Nichols =

English printer and antiquary

- Born: 15 July 1779; Fleet Street, London
- Died: 19 October 1863 (aged 84); Ealing, West London
- Occupations: Printer, antiquary
- Spouse: Eliza Baker (m. 1805; died 1846)

John Bowyer Nichols (15 July 1779 – 19 October 1863) was an English printer and antiquary.

== Life ==
Nichols was born at Red Lion Passage, Fleet Street, London, on 15 July 1779. He was the eldest son of John Nichols, by his second wife, Martha Green (1756–1788).

He spent his early years with his maternal grandfather at Hinckley, Leicestershire, and was educated at St Paul's School, London, which he left in September 1796 to enter his father's printing office.

== Career ==
He had a part in the editorship of the Gentleman's Magazine, and contributed under the initials J. B. N., or N. R. S. (the final letters of his name). He became the sole proprietor of the magazine in 1833, and in the following year transferred a share to William Pickering of Piccadilly. This share he subsequently repurchased, and in 1856 conveyed the whole property to John Henry Parker of Oxford.

The printing firm became J. Nichols, Son, & Bentley, with an office at the Cicero's Head, Red Lion Passage, Fleet Street, as well as at 25 Parliament Street, Westminster. Nichols had become one of the printers of the votes and proceedings of the Houses of Parliament, an appointment in which he followed his father and William Bowyer (1699–1777). For a short time he was printer to the corporation of the city of London. In 1821, after the resignation of his father, he became one of the three registrars of the Royal Literary Fund. He was master of the Stationers' Company in 1850, having served all the annual offices.

Towards the end of his life he became blind. He was a fellow of the Linnean Society (1812) and of the Society of Antiquaries of London (1818), and was appointed their printer in 1824; he was an original member of the Athenæum Club, the Royal Archaeological Institute, the Numismatic Society, and the Royal Society of Literature. He also filled various public offices in Westminster.

=== Works ===
He superintended the passing through the press of major county histories. These included George Ormerod's Cheshire, Robert Clutterbuck's Hertfordshire, Robert Surtees's Durham, James Raine's North Durham, Colt Hoare's Wiltshire, Joseph Hunter's South Yorkshire, George Baker's Northamptonshire, Thomas Dunham Whitaker's Whalley and Craven, and George Lipscomb's Buckinghamshire. He left large printed and manuscript collections on English topography. His last literary undertaking was the completion (vol. vii. in 1848 and vol. viii. in 1856) of his father's Illustrations of the Literary History of the Eighteenth Century, the sequel to the Literary Anecdotes. William Bray refers to the accuracy of Nichols in revising the proof-sheets of the second volume of his edition of Owen Manning's History of Surrey. Nichols circulated proposals in 1811 for printing the third and fourth volumes of John Hutchins's Dorset, of which the stock of the first three volumes had been lost in the fire on his father's premises in 1808. The fourth volume appeared in 1815, with his name on the title-page jointly with that of Richard Gough. In 1818 he published the autobiography of the bookseller John Dunton, which had furnished materials for the Literary Anecdotes of his father.

== Personal life ==
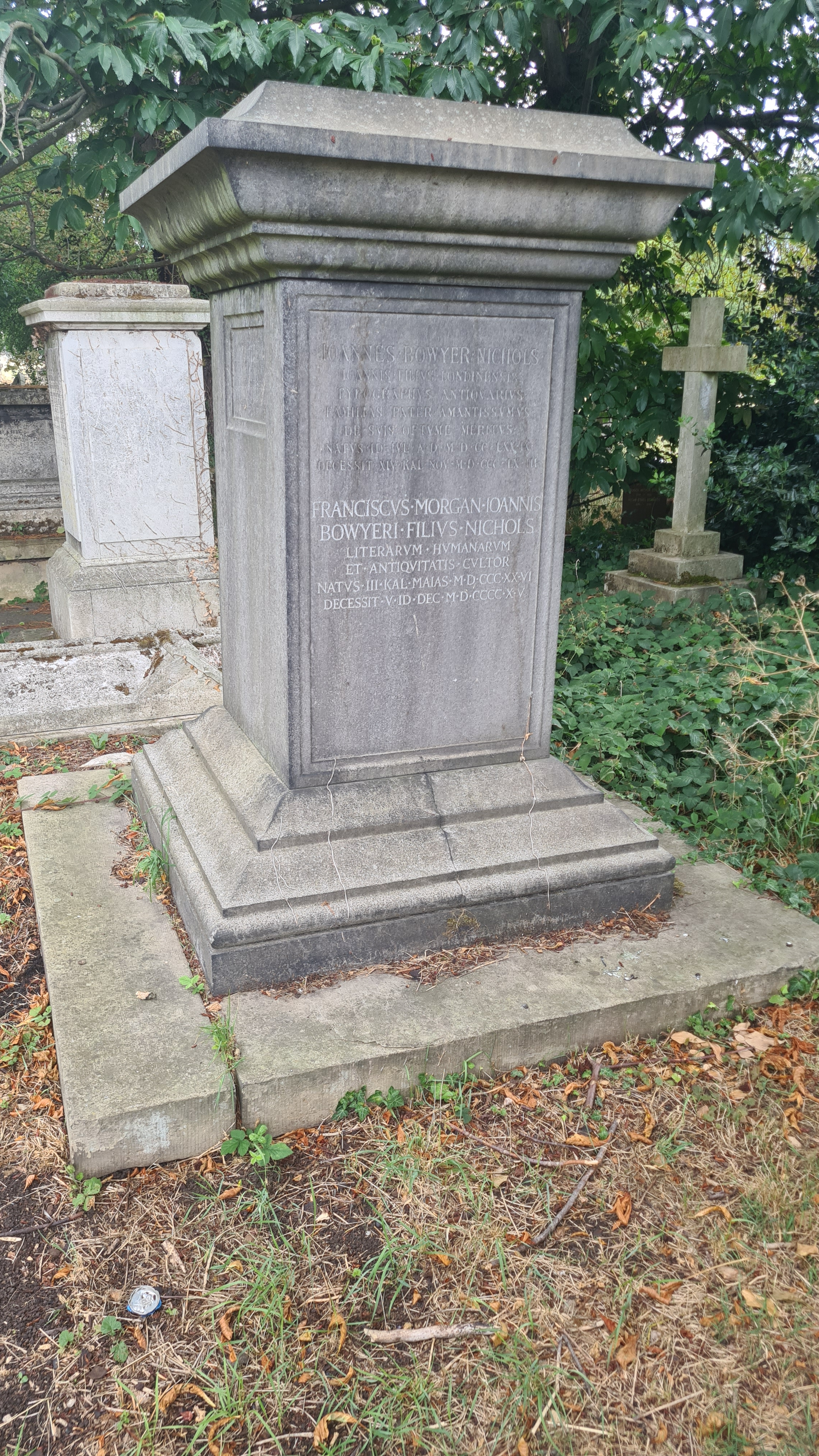
Nichols' tomb at Kensal Green Cemetery

He married, in 1805, Eliza Baker (d. 1846), by whom he had fourteen children; of these there survived three sons: John Gough Nichols, Robert Cradock Nichols (d. 1892), and Francis Morgan Nichols (b. 1826); and four daughters. The poet and artist Bowyer Nichols was his great-grandson.

He died at Ealing on 19 October 1863, aged 84, and was buried at Kensal Green cemetery.

=== Legacy ===
There are portraits of Nichols by J. Jackson, in watercolour, about 1818; by F. Hopwood, in pencil, 1821; by John Wood, in oil, 1836; and by Samuel Laurence, in chalks, 1850. The last was lithographed by J. H. Lynch. W. Behnes exhibited a bust of him at the Royal Academy in 1858.

== Other works ==
- A brief Account of the Guildhall of the City of London, London, 1819.
- Account of the Royal Hospital and Collegiate Church of St. Katharine, near the Tower, London, 1824,(based on the history of Andrew Ducarel, 1782, with additional plates).
- Historical Notices of Fonthill Abbey, Wiltshire, London, 1836, (based on the publications of J. Britton and J. Rutter, with plates from the work of Rutter).
- Catalogue of the Hoare Library at Stourhead, co. Wilts, with an Account of the Museum of British Antiquities, privately printed, London, 1840. "Notices of the Library at Stourhead" were contributed by Nichols to the Wiltshire and Natural History Magazine, 1855, vol. 2.

Nichols also edited:

- Joseph Cradock's Memoirs, vols. iii. and iv. 1828;
- Anecdotes of William Hogarth, 1833, with forty-eight plates, a compilation from his father's ‘Biographical Anecdotes of Mr. Hogarth’;
- John Thomas Smith, Cries of London, 1839; and
- History and Antiquities of the Abbey of St. Edmunds Bury by Richard Yates, second edition, London, 1843, 2 parts.
