= Robert Nichols (poet) =

English writer

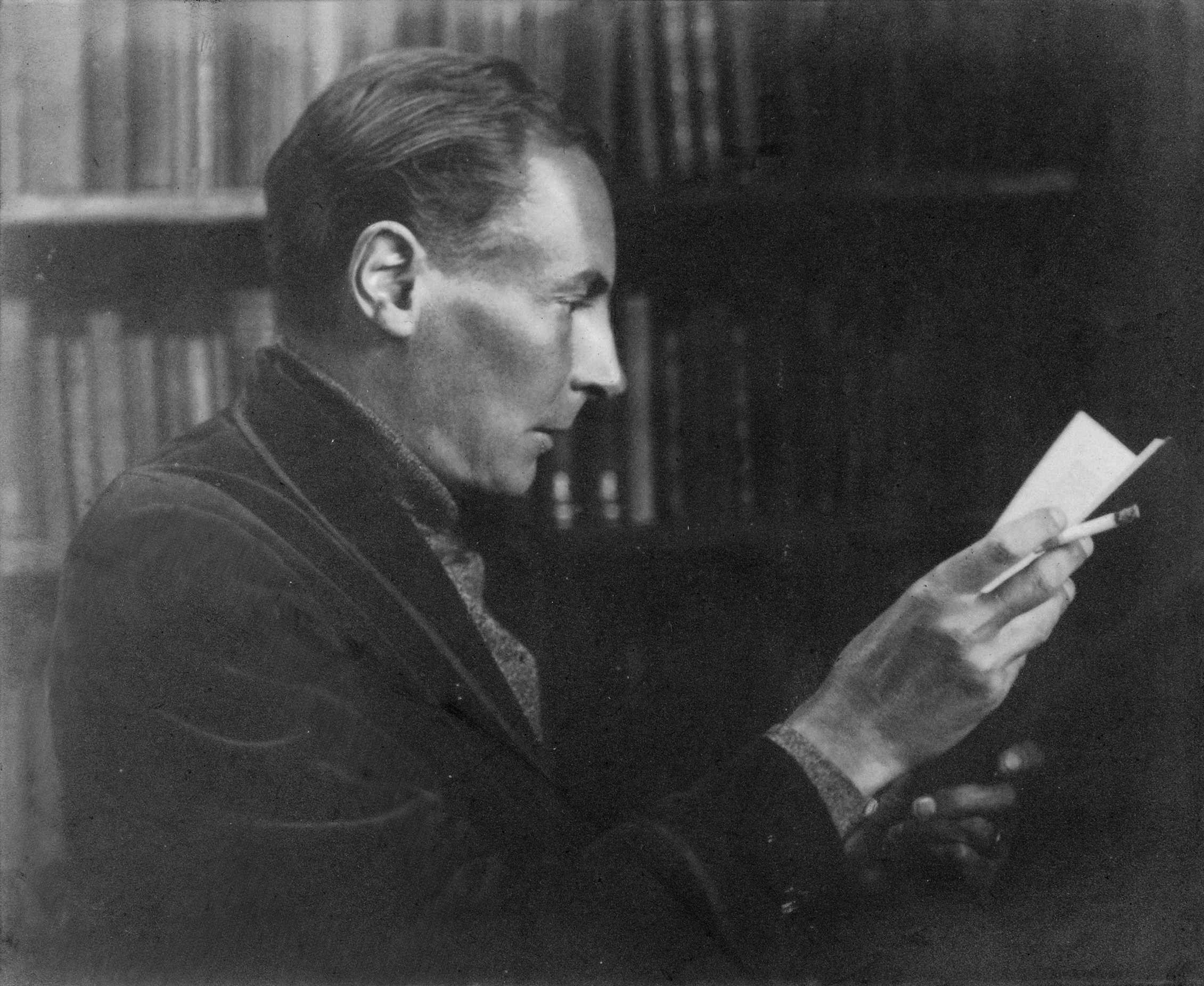
- Robert Nichols (Elliott & Fry, 1930)
- Born: 6 September 1893
- Died: 17 December 1944 (aged 51)
- Resting place: St Mary's Church, Lawford, Essex
- Education: Winchester College; Trinity College, Oxford
- Occupations: War poet, playwright
- Partner: Norah Denny (1922–?)
- Relatives: John Bowyer Buchanan Nichols (father)
- Writing career
- Period: First World War

Robert Malise Bowyer Nichols (6 September 1893 – 17 December 1944) was an English writer, known as a war poet of the First World War, and a playwright.

== Life and career ==
The son of the poet John Bowyer Buchanan Nichols, Robert Nichols was educated at Winchester College and Trinity College, Oxford. Commissioned into the Royal Field Artillery in 1914, Nichols served on the Western Front, including the Battle of Loos and the Battle of the Somme, until invalided home with shell shock in August 1916.

He began to give poetry readings, in 1917. In 1918 he was a member of an official British propaganda mission to the US, where he also gave readings. One of his best known poems of the conflict is The Assault, which "evokes the destructive havoc and the emotional turbulence of an attack in verse of unusual freedom and energy"

After the war he moved in social circles in London. He was a protege of Edith Sitwell, Aldous Huxley became a long-term friend and correspondent, and Nichols wooed Nancy Cunard with sonnets, but married Norah Denny in 1922 at St Martin-in-the-Fields. He was Professor of English Literature at the University of Tokyo from 1921 to 1924, and later worked in the theatre and cinema. The play Wings over Europe (1928), with Maurice Browne, was a Broadway hit. Nichols wrote several prose fictions, including The Smile of the Sphinx, a fantasy set in the Middle East and Golgotha & co., a satirical fantasy featuring the Wandering Jew, the return of Christ and a future war. These fictions were collected in Nichols' book Fantastica.

He lived in Germany and Austria in 1933–34. He then settled in the south of France, leaving in June 1940. He died at the age of 51, and is buried at St Mary's Church, Lawford, Essex, next to the family home, Lawford Hall.

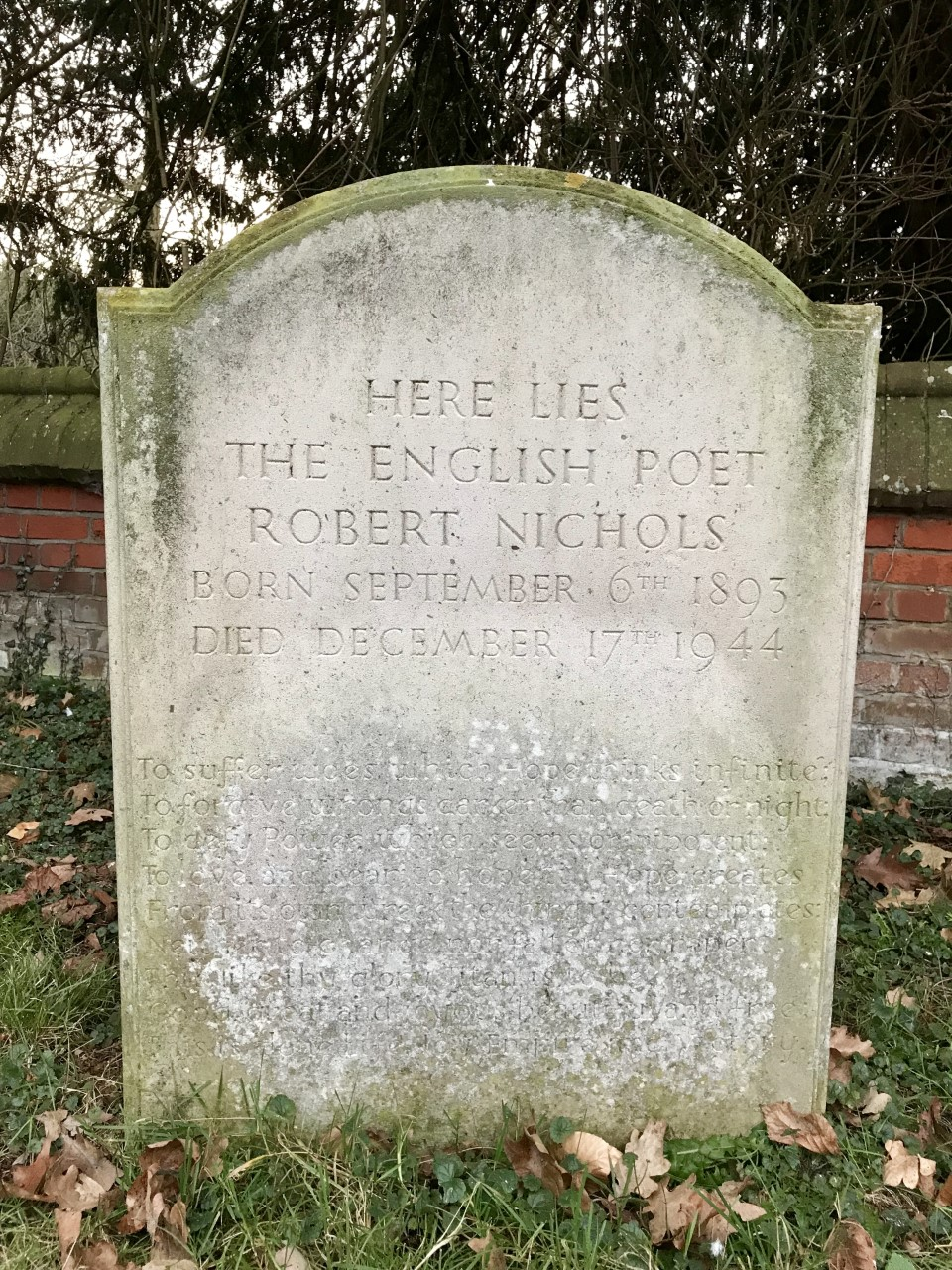
The grave of Robert Nichols in the churchyard of St Mary's Church, Lawford

On 11 November 1985, Nichols was among 16 Great War poets commemorated on a slate stone unveiled in Westminster Abbey's Poet's Corner. The inscription on the stone was taken from Wilfred Owen's "Preface" to his poems and reads: "My subject is War, and the pity of War. The Poetry is in the pity."

== Works ==
- Invocation (1915)
- Ardours and Endurances (1917)
- A Faun's Holiday & Poems & Phantasies (1917)
- Sonnets to Aurelia (1920), poems
- The Smile of the Sphinx (1920)
- Guilty Souls (1922), play
- Fantastica : being the smile of the Sphinx and other tales of imagination (1923)
- Twenty Below (1926) with Jim Tully
- Under the Yew; or, The Gambler Transformed (1928) novel
- Wings Over Europe (1928), play
- Fisbo, or the Looking Glass Loaned (1934) verse satire aimed at Osbert Lancaster
- A Spanish Triptych (1936) poems
- Such was My Singing (1942) selected verse (includes fragments of the unfinished play Don Juan Tenorio the Great).

== Musical settings of plays and poetry ==
In 1919, the English composer Kaikhosru Shapurji Sorabji wrote Music to "The Rider by Night" (not extant in full). Peter Warlock (a close friend) composed a choral setting of The Full Heart in 1916, and a song setting of The Water Lily in 1922, along with others, now lost. The Naiads' Music and The Pigeon Song were set by Arthur Bliss (also a friend) in his Pastoral: (Lie Strewn White Flocks) of 1928, and Bliss also used Dawn on the Somme in his choral symphony Morning Heroes of 1930. E. J. Moeran set Blue-eyed Spring for voice and piano in 1932 and used poetry from the unfinished play Don Juan Tenorio the Great for his Nocturne for baritone solo, chorus and orchestra of 1935. Christian Darnton set five poems by Nichols in his 1938 work Swansong, for soprano and orchestra.

== Sources ==
- Author and Book Info.com
- Putting Poetry First: A Life of Robert Nichols, 1893-1944 (2003) William and Anne Charlton
