= Manasseh Dawes =

English barrister

Manasseh Dawes (died 1829) was an English barrister and miscellaneous writer.

== Life ==
Dawes was a barrister of the Inner Temple. He left the bar and lived quietly at Clifford's Inn for the last thirty-six years of his life. He died 2 April 1829.

== Works ==
Dawes took the Whig side on the American War of Independence, and the law of libel; but defended William Blackstone against Jeremy Bentham, had doubts as to abolishing tests, and held that philosophical truth was beyond reach. His major works were:

- Letter to Lord Chatham on American Affairs, 1777 (on the title-page he describes himself as author of "several anonymous pieces").
- Essay on Intellectual Liberty, 1780; it criticised Jeremy Bentham's Fragment.
- Philosophical Considerations, 1780; on the controversy between Joseph Priestley and Richard Price.
- Nature and Extent of Supreme Power, 1783; on John Locke's Social Compact.
- "Remarks on the Preceding Dialogue ['The Principles of Government, in a Dialogue between a Gentleman and a Farmer' by William Jones], and the Case of the Dean of Asaph" in England's Alarm! On the Prevailing Doctrine of Libels, as Laid down by the Earl of Mansfield, 1785.
- Deformity of the Doctrine of Libels, 1785; this and the previous work refer to the Case of the Dean of St Asaph.
- Introduction to a Knowledge of the Law on Real Estates, 1814.
- Epitome of the Law of Landed Property, 1818.

Dawes also edited (1784) a posthumous poem by John Stuckey on The Vanity of all Human Knowledge, with a dedication to Priestley.
