= Richard Hales =

English cricketer and clergyman

Personal information
- Full name: Richard Cox Hales
- Born: 29 September 1817; Dinapore, Bengal Presidency, British India
- Died: 25 April 1906 (aged 88); Hove, Sussex, England

Domestic team information
- Years: Team
- 1840: Oxford University

Career statistics
Competition	First-class
Matches	1
Runs scored	1
Batting average	1.00
100s/50s	–/–
Top score	1*
Catches/stumpings	–/–
- Source: Cricinfo, 5 May 2020

Richard Cox Hales (29 September 1817; Dinapore – 25 April 1906; Hove) was an English first-class cricketer and clergyman.

The son of James Hales of the Bengal Army, he was born in British India at Dinapore in September 1817. He later studied in England as a scholar at Magdalene College at the University of Cambridge in 1838, before furthering his studies at Magdalen College at the University of Oxford. While studying at Oxford, he made a single appearance in first-class cricket for Oxford University against the Marylebone Cricket Club at Lord's in 1840. Batting twice in the match, he ended the Oxford first innings unbeaten on a single run, while in their second innings he was dismissed without scoring by Frederick Thackeray.

After graduating from Oxford, Hales took holy orders in the Church of England. His first ecclesiastical post was as rector of Carfax, Oxford from 1850, where he was also a lecturer at St. Martin's Carfax. He became the rector of Woodmancote, Sussex in 1860.
