= Richard Yates (antiquary) =

English cleric and antiquary

Richard Yates (1769–1834) was an English cleric and antiquary.

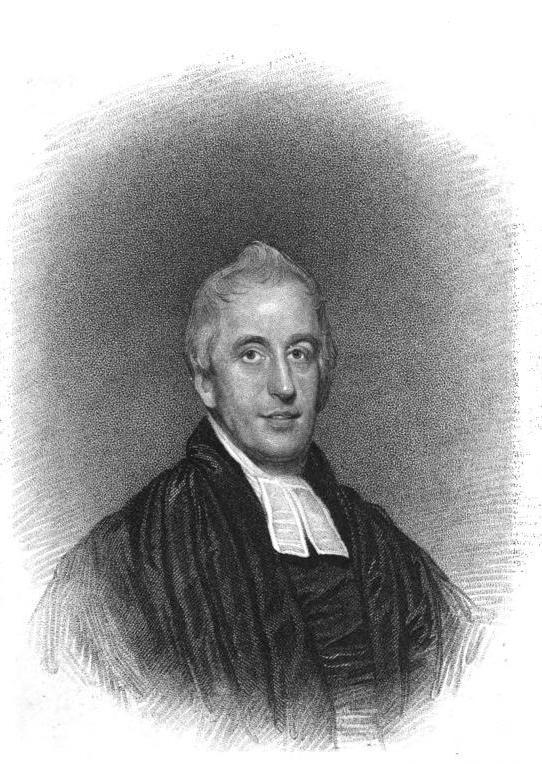
Richard Yates (1818), after Samuel Drummond

== Life ==
Born in July 1769 at Bury St. Edmunds, he was the son of Richard Yates (1741–1803). He was educated at Bury grammar school, but left it at the age of 15 to take a post as usher in a school at Linton, Cambridgeshire. In 1789 he was a teacher at Chelmsford grammar school, and in 1792 at a school in Hammersmith. In September 1796 he was ordained deacon, and preached his first sermon as curate of Chelsea Hospital on 2 October 1796. In January 1797 he was ordained priest, and in March 1798 he was appointed one of the chaplains of the hospital, with which he remained connected until his death. While at Chelsea Hospital he acquired a reputation as a popular preacher.

In 1793 Yates had matriculated at Jesus College, Cambridge. In May 1804 he was appointed to the rectory of Ashen, Essex. In 1805, as a ten-year man, he took the degree of B.D., and subsequently (1818) was D.D. at Cambridge.

Yates lived mainly in London, where he was in demand as a preacher at the fashionable chapels. He interested himself in the conduct and management of public charities, and acted as secretary of the asylum for the deaf and dumb. In 1805 he was elected one of the treasurers of the Literary Fund, a post which he continued to hold till his death nearly thirty years later.

Yates was a Fellow of the Society of Antiquaries of London. He declined offers of the livings of Blackburn in Lancashire, and of Hilgay in Norfolk. During the last five or six years of his life he was an invalid, and he died at Penshurst in Kent on 24 August 1834.

== Works ==
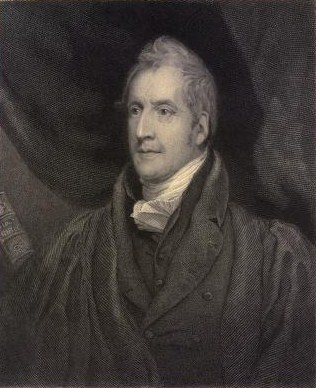
Richard Yates, portrait after James Tannock

On 28 April 1803 Richard Yates the elder died at Bury, having lived for 37 years within the walls of the abbey ruins, of which he was custodian. He had drawings and notes on the history of the abbey. The first part was published, edited by Richard Yates the younger, in 1805, as Monastic Remains of the Town and Abbey of St. Edmunds Bury. It gave a chronological history of the abbey. The first chapter of a second part, describing the western gate of the abbey, and plates, were published as specimens at the end of part i. with appendix of a number of Bury charters. The second part itself did not appear until 1843, published through the efforts of John Bowyer Nichols, a friend of Yates.

Yates published also sermons, and a pamphlet called The Church in Danger: a Statement of the Cause, and of the probable Means of averting that Danger, attempted in a Letter to the Earl of Liverpool (1815). This pamphlet, which pointed out the shortage of places of public worship for Anglicans, was commended by Nicholas Vansittart, the chancellor of the exchequer, who was advocating parliamentary grants for new churches and chapels, particularly in London.

== Family ==
Yates married in 1810 the only daughter of Patrick Telfer of Gower Street, giving him independent means. He left a family of three children.

== Notes ==
Attribution

This article incorporates text from a publication now in the public domain: Lee, Sidney, ed. (1900). "Yates, Richard (1769-1834)". Dictionary of National Biography. Vol. 63. London: Smith, Elder & Co.
