= United Kingdom by-election records =

Parliamentary by-elections in the United Kingdom occur when a Member of Parliament (MP) vacates a House of Commons seat (due to resignation, death, disqualification or expulsion) during the course of a parliament.

== Scope of these records ==
Although the history of Parliament is much older, most of these records concern only the period since 1945. Earlier exceptional results are listed separately.

Parliaments of England, Scotland, Ireland and the various unions of these Kingdoms had been assembled since the medieval period, though these bodies only gradually evolved to be democratically elected by the populace and records are incomplete. England and Wales had numerous "rotten boroughs" with tiny and tightly controlled electorates until the Reform Act 1832. The most recent significant expansions of the electoral franchise were the Representation of the People Act 1918 which allowed some women to vote for the first time and greatly expanded the franchise of men, overall more than doubling the size of the electorate, and the Representation of the People (Equal Franchise) Act 1928 which expanded the franchise of women to be equal to that of men.

Furthermore, there are various additional factors complicating comparisons between earlier results and modern cases. Among the most significant aspects of historical elections which are no longer present are:

- Frequent interventions and withdrawals of parties in different seats.
- Frequent coalitions between parties, splits within parties and floor-crossing by members.
- Uncontested elections and truces between parties, in particular during both World Wars.
- Generally more significant competition from independent candidates and minor parties.
- Multi-member seats and university seats (abolished 1950).
- Higher frequency of by-elections, partly due to the practice of often uncontested ministerial by-elections which ended in 1926.
- Generally higher turnouts, although several wartime elections exhibited the lowest recorded turnouts.
- Generally higher variation in size of constituency electorates.

Since 1945, the legal and general political situation regarding by-elections has been broadly stable, allowing for meaningful comparison of records.

These records include those from Northern Ireland. However, the politics of Northern Ireland is mostly separate from that of Great Britain so comparisons can be problematic.

== Glossary ==
For comparison purposes the following definitions have been adopted.

- Gain: victory by a party that was not victorious at the immediate previous election
- Loss: defeat of a party that was victorious at the immediate previous election
- Hold: victory by a party that was victorious at the immediate previous election
- Win: victory by a party. ambiguous term that could mean either a gain or a hold
- Incumbent: the party that held the seat at the immediately previous election, irrespective of any intervening change of candidate or candidate's change of party
- Third party: In England, since 1922, the "third party" has been the Liberal Party and its successor, the Liberal Democrats. Additionally, in Scotland and Wales the Scottish National Party (SNP) and Plaid Cymru are also considered to be third parties. Prior to 1922, the third party was the Labour Party.
- Minor party: parties smaller than the third party
- Uncontested: an election where only one candidate is put forward. No votes are actually cast and the candidate is by definition the victor.

== Numerical records ==
For more information about what is meant by the term "swing", see Swing (United Kingdom)

=== Largest swings in percentage share of votes ===
Election	Swing	From	To
1983 Bermondsey by-election	44.2	Labour	Liberal
2014 Clacton by-election	44.1 (Note: Seat was held by the incumbent MP.)	Conservative	UKIP
1973 Lincoln by-election	43.0	Labour	Democratic Labour
2024 Rochdale by-election	41.8 (Note: Labour candidate Azhar Ali was disendorsed by the party at the time of the election, due to alleged anti-Semitic comments)	Labour	Workers Party
1967 Hamilton by-election	37.9	Labour	SNP
2012 Bradford West by-election	36.6	Labour	Respect
1993 Christchurch by-election	35.4	Conservative	Liberal Democrats
2021 North Shropshire by-election	34.2	Conservative	Liberal Democrats
1988 Glasgow Govan by-election	33.1	Labour	SNP
1972 Sutton and Cheam by-election	32.6	Conservative	Liberal
1979 Liverpool Edge Hill by-election	30.2	Labour	Liberal
2022 Tiverton and Honiton by-election	29.9	Conservative	Liberal Democrats
1994 Dudley West by-election	29.2	Conservative	Labour
2023 Somerton and Frome by-election	29.0	Conservative	Liberal Democrats
2003 Brent East by-election	28.9	Labour	Liberal Democrats
2024 Wellingborough by-election	28.5	Conservative	Labour
1993 Newbury by-election	28.4	Conservative	Liberal Democrats
2014 Rochester and Strood by-election	28.3	Conservative	UKIP
2004 Birmingham Hodge Hill by-election	26.7 (Note: Seat was held by the incumbent party.)	Labour	Liberal Democrats
2026 Gorton and Denton by-election	26.4	Labour	Green
1962 Orpington by-election	26.3	Conservative	Liberal
2024 Blackpool South by-election	26.3	Conservative	Labour
1973 Ripon by-election	25.3	Conservative	Liberal
2021 Chesham and Amersham by-election	25.1	Conservative	Liberal Democrats
1991 Ribble Valley by-election	24.7	Conservative	Liberal Democrats
1981 Croydon North West by-election	24.2	Conservative	Liberal
2023 Tamworth by-election	23.9	Conservative	Labour
2023 Selby and Ainsty by-election	23.7	Conservative	Labour
1994 Dagenham by-election	23.1	Conservative	Labour
1999 Hamilton South by-election	22.6	Labour	SNP
1976 Walsall North by-election	22.5	Labour	Conservative
2008 Glasgow East by-election	22.5	Labour	SNP
1996 South East Staffordshire by-election	22.1	Conservative	Labour
1994 Barking by-election	22.0	Conservative	Labour
2016 Richmond Park by-election	21.7 (Note: Seat contested by the incumbent MP, who failed to gain re-election.)	Conservative	Liberal Democrats
2004 Leicester South by-election	21.5	Labour	Liberal Democrats
1990 Mid Staffordshire by-election	21.3	Conservative	Labour
1968 Dudley by-election	21.2	Labour	Conservative
1977 Ashfield by-election	20.9	Labour	Conservative
1976 Newcastle-upon-Tyne Central by-election	20.7	Labour	Liberal
1999 Leeds Central by-election	20.5	Labour	Liberal Democrats
2023 Mid Bedfordshire by-election	20.5	Conservative	Labour
2023 Rutherglen and Hamilton West by-election	20.4	SNP	Labour
1990 Eastbourne by-election	20.0	Conservative	Liberal Democrats

=== Largest swings to an incumbent governing party ===
It is rare to see any swing towards the governing party in by-elections. However, there are some examples of it happening.

Election	Swing	From	To
2021 Hartlepool by-election	16.0	Labour	Conservative
1945 Bournemouth by-election (Note: Despite the swing to the governing Labour Party, the opposition Conservative Party held the by-election.)	10.3	Conservative	Labour
1982 Mitcham and Morden by-election	10.2	Labour	Conservative
1878 Worcester by-election	9.9	Liberal	Conservative
2017 Copeland by-election	6.7	Labour	Conservative
1978 Hamilton by-election	4.5	SNP	Labour
2026 Makerfield by-election	3.5	Reform	Labour
1945 Smethwick by-election	2.9	Conservative	Labour
1997 Beckenham by-election	2.6	Conservative	Labour
1945 Edinburgh East by-election	2.0	Conservative	Labour
1978 Berwick and East Lothian by-election	0.8	Conservative	Labour

=== Largest fall in percentage share of vote ===
A party's share of the vote at a general election is not always matched at subsequent by-elections, but given the five-year maximum term of a Parliament, reductions of 20% or more are unusual. Those of 25% or more are listed below:

Election	Fall: %	Party	Result
1948 Glasgow Camlachie by-election	51.3	Ind. Labour Party	Unionist gain
2024 Rochdale by-election	43.9	Labour	Workers Party gain
2024 Wellingborough by-election	37.6	Conservative	Labour gain
1983 Bermondsey by-election	37.5	Labour	Liberal gain
1969 Birmingham Ladywood by-election	33.4	Labour	Liberal gain
1993 Christchurch by-election	32.5	Conservative	Liberal Democrats gain
2024 Blackpool South by-election	32.2	Conservative	Labour gain
1946 Glasgow Bridgeton by-election	32.1	Ind. Labour Party	Ind. Labour Party hold
1958 Rochdale by-election	31.7	Conservative	Labour gain
2021 North Shropshire by-election	31.1	Conservative	Liberal Democrats gain
1994 Dudley West by-election	30.2	Conservative	Labour gain
1995 North Down by-election	29.9	NI Conservatives	UK Unionist gain from Popular Unionist
1967 Hamilton by-election	29.7	Labour	SNP gain
2004 Birmingham Hodge Hill by-election	29.6	Labour	Labour hold
1961 Paisley by-election	29.5	Unionist	Labour hold
2003 Brent East by-election	29.4	Labour	Liberal Democrats gain
1993 Newbury by-election	29.0	Conservative	Liberal Democrats gain
1968 Caerphilly by-election	28.7	Labour	Labour hold
1999 Hamilton South by-election	28.7	Labour	Labour hold
2023 Mid Bedfordshire by-election	28.6	Conservative	Labour gain
2014 Clacton by-election	28.4	Conservative	UKIP gain
1962 West Lothian by-election	28.3	Unionist	Labour hold
1979 Liverpool Edge Hill by-election	28.1	Labour	Liberal gain
1958 Torrington by-election	27.7	Conservative	Liberal gain
1968 Oldham West by-election	27.6	Labour	Conservative gain
2009 Norwich North by-election	26.7	Labour	Conservative gain
1933 Fulham East by-election	26.6	Conservative	Labour gain
1972 Sutton and Cheam by-election	26.2	Conservative	Liberal gain
2023 Selby and Ainsty by-election	26.0	Conservative	Labour gain
2023 Tamworth by-election	25.7	Conservative	Labour gain
1948 Glasgow Gorbals by-election	25.5	Labour	Labour hold
2019 Peterborough by-election	25.5	Conservative	Labour hold
2026 Gorton and Denton by-election	25.4	Labour	Green gain
1962 West Derbyshire by-election	25.2	Conservative	Conservative hold
2004 Leicester South by-election	25.2	Labour	Liberal Democrats gain

In the 1934 Merthyr by-election the Independent Labour Party share dropped from 69.4% in the 1931 general election to 9.8% (a record 59.6% loss) losing the seat to the Labour Party. However, the 1931 election had no Labour Party candidate, and the MP, R. C. Wallhead, had previously been elected as a Labour candidate in prior elections, when the ILP was affiliated to Labour. Prior to his death, Wallhead joined the Labour Party, so this result could be classed as a Labour hold.

The 1919 East Antrim by-election saw the Irish Unionist party face its first Unionist opposition in the seat since 1906 (in the 1918 general election the heavily unionist area gave the Irish Unionist 94.6% of the vote in a contest with a Sinn Féin candidate). An Independent Unionist candidate won the seat, with the Irish Unionist share dropping by 52.8%

Worst results for other parties:

Election	Fall: %	Party	Result
2021 Hartlepool by-election (Note: Compared with the Brexit Party candidate at the general election.)	24.6	Reform	Conservative gain from Labour
1982 Belfast South by-election	22.4	UUP	UUP hold
2014 Heywood and Middleton by-election	17.6	Liberal Democrats	Labour hold
2023 Rutherglen and Hamilton West by-election	16.6	SNP	Labour gain
2009 Glasgow North East by-election	14.0	Socialist Labour	Labour gain from Speaker
2017 Copeland by-election	9.0	UKIP	Conservative gain from Labour
1986 Newry and Armagh by-election	7.7	Sinn Féin	SDLP gain from Ulster Unionist
1963 Swansea East by-election	5.3	Plaid Cymru	Labour hold

=== Largest increase in percentage share of vote ===
Election	Increase in Share	Party	Result
1986 East Londonderry by-election (Note: The by-election was boycotted by nationalist parties)	56.0	UUP	UUP hold
2012 Bradford West by-election	52.8	Respect	Respect gain
1983 Bermondsey by-election	50.9	Liberal	Liberal gain
1986 South Antrim by-election	48.4	UUP	UUP hold
1986 East Antrim by-election	47.5	UUP	UUP hold
1986 North Antrim by-election	43.2	DUP	DUP hold
2016 Batley and Spen by-election (Note: The by-election was not contested by any other major party)	42.6	Labour	Labour hold
1972 Sutton and Cheam by-election	39.0	Liberal	Liberal gain
1993 Christchurch by-election	38.6	Liberal Democrats	Liberal Democrats gain
1988 Glasgow Govan by-election	38.4	SNP	SNP gain
2022 Tiverton and Honiton by-election	38.1	Liberal Democrats	Liberal Democrats gain
2021 North Shropshire by-election	37.1	Liberal Democrats	Liberal Democrats gain
1979 Liverpool Edge Hill by-election	36.8	Liberal	Liberal gain
2014 Heywood and Middleton by-election	36.1	UKIP	Labour hold
1986 Belfast East by-election	35.7	DUP	DUP hold
1986 Belfast North by-election	35.3	UUP	UUP hold
1973 Glasgow Govan by-election	31.6	SNP	SNP gain
1986 Lagan Valley by-election	31.5	UUP	UUP hold
2021 Chesham and Amersham by-election	30.4	Liberal Democrats	Liberal Democrats gain
1973 Ripon by-election	30.4	Liberal	Liberal gain
2016 Richmond Park by-election	30.3	Liberal Democrats	Liberal Democrats gain
1981 Croydon North West by-election	29.5	Liberal	Liberal gain
1968 Caerphilly by-election	29.3	Plaid Cymru	Labour hold
2003 Brent East by-election	28.5	Liberal Democrats	Liberal Democrats gain
1994 Dudley West by-election	28.0	Labour	Labour gain
1987 Greenwich by-election	27.9	SDP	SDP gain
2026 Gorton and Denton by-election	27.4	Green	Green gain
1972 Merthyr Tydfil by-election	27.4	Plaid Cymru	Labour gain
1966 Carmarthen by-election	27.4	Plaid Cymru	Plaid Cymru gain
1991 Ribble Valley by-election	27.1	Liberal Democrats	Liberal Democrats gain
1994 Monklands East by-election	26.9	SNP	Labour hold
1931 Gateshead by-election	26.9	Conservative	Labour hold
2022 Southend West by-election	26.9	Conservative	Conservative hold
2004 Birmingham Hodge Hill by-election	26.1	Liberal Democrats	Labour hold
2008 Glasgow East by-election	26.1	SNP	SNP gain
2026 Aberdeen South by-election	25.1	Conservative	Conservative gain

=== Largest winning share of the vote ===
Winning shares of the vote above 90%, since 1918:

Candidate	Party	Election	Votes	% Share
Ernest Gates	Conservative	1940 Middleton and Prestwich by-election	32,036	98.7
Ian Paisley	DUP	1986 North Antrim by-election	33,937	97.4
John Craik-Henderson	Conservative	1940 Leeds North East by-election	23,882	97.1
Charles Key	Labour	1940 Bow and Bromley by-election	11,594	95.8
John Taylor	UUP	1986 Strangford by-election	32,627	94.2
Clifford Forsythe	UUP	1986 South Antrim by-election	30,087	94.1
William Ross	UUP	1986 East Londonderry by-election	30,922	93.9
Arthur Woodburn	Labour	1939 Clackmannanshire and East Stirlingshire by-election	15,645	93.7
Spencer Summers	Conservative	1940 Northampton by-election	16,587	93.4
Harry Thorneycroft	Labour	1942 Manchester Clayton by-election	8,892	93.3
James Hollins	Labour	1940 Silvertown by-election	14,343	92.8
Francis Douglas	Labour	1940 Battersea North by-election	9,947	92.6
Henry Willink	Conservative	1940 Croydon North by-election	14,163	90.7
James Henry Molyneaux	UUP	1986 Lagan Valley by-election	32,514	90.7

=== Largest numerical majority overturned ===
Majorities over 9,000 votes overturned:

Candidate	Party	Election	Previous party	Majority overturned	New majority
Alistair Strathern	Labour	2023 Mid Bedfordshire by-election	Conservative	24,664	1,192
Richard Foord	Liberal Democrats	2022 Tiverton and Honiton by-election	Conservative	24,239	6,144
Sarah Olney	Liberal Democrats	2016 Richmond Park by-election	Conservative (Note: The Conservative Party did not stand a candidate in the election, although the incumbent Conservative MP stood as an independent candidate.)	23,015	1,872
Diana Maddock	Liberal Democrats	1993 Christchurch by-election	Conservative	23,015	16,427
Helen Morgan	Liberal Democrats	2021 North Shropshire by-election	Conservative	22,949	5,925
Tim Smith	Conservative	1977 Ashfield by-election	Labour	22,915	264
Keir Mather	Labour	2023 Selby and Ainsty by-election	Conservative	20,137	4,161
Sarah Edwards	Labour	2023 Tamworth by-election	Conservative	19,634	1,316
Michael Carr	Liberal Democrats	1991 Ribble Valley by-election	Conservative	19,528	4,601
Jim Sillars	SNP	1988 Glasgow Govan by-election	Labour	19,509	3,554
Shirley Williams	SDP	1981 Crosby by-election	Conservative	19,272	5,289
Sarah Dyke	Liberal Democrats	2023 Somerton and Frome by-election	Conservative	19,213	11,008
Gen Kitchen	Labour	2024 Wellingborough by-election	Conservative	18,540	6,436
David Bellotti	Liberal Democrats	1990 Eastbourne by-election	Conservative	16,923	4,550
Winnie Ewing	SNP	1967 Hamilton by-election	Labour	16,576	1,799
Sarah Green	Liberal Democrats	2021 Chesham and Amersham by-election	Conservative	16,223	8,028
Robin Hodgson	Conservative	1976 Walsall North by-election	Labour	15,885	4,379
Eric Lubbock	Liberal	1962 Orpington by-election	Conservative	14,760	7,855
Sarah Pochin	Reform	2025 Runcorn and Helsby by-election	Labour	14,696	6
Sylvia Heal	Labour	1990 Mid Staffordshire by-election	Conservative	14,654	9,449
John Mason	SNP	2008 Glasgow East by-election	Labour	13,507	365
Hannah Spencer	Green	2026 Gorton and Denton by-election	Labour	13,413	4,402
Parmjit Singh Gill	Liberal Democrats	2004 Leicester South by-election	Labour	13,243	1,654
Sarah Teather	Liberal Democrats	2003 Brent East by-election	Labour	13,047	1,118
Graham Tope	Liberal	1972 Sutton and Cheam by-election	Conservative	12,696	7,417
David Rendel	Liberal Democrats	1993 Newbury by-election	Conservative	12,357	22,055
Douglas Carswell	UKIP	2014 Clacton by-election	Conservative (Note: The victorious candidate was the incumbent MP, having triggered the by-election after switching parties.)	12,068	12,404
David Austick	Liberal	1973 Ripon by-election	Conservative	12,064	946
Simon Hughes	Liberal	1983 Bermondsey by-election	Labour	11,756	9,319
Willie Rennie	Liberal Democrats	2006 Dunfermline and West Fife by-election	Labour	11,562	1,800
Damien Egan	Labour	2024 Kingswood by-election	Conservative	11,220	2,501
Donald Williams	Conservative	1968 Dudley by-election	Labour	10,022	11,656
Mark Reckless	UKIP	2014 Rochester and Strood by-election	Conservative	9,953	2,920
George Galloway	Workers Party	2024 Rochdale by-election	Labour	9,668	5,697

=== Lowest winning share of the vote ===
Winning shares of the vote below 35%, since 1918:

Candidate	Party	Election	Votes	% Share
Henry Strauss	Conservative	1946 Combined English Universities by-election	5,483	30.0
Lisa Forbes	Labour	2019 Peterborough by-election	10,484	30.9
Mike Thornton	Liberal Democrats	2013 Eastleigh by-election	13,342	32.1
Edward Campbell	Conservative	1930 Bromley by-election	12,782	32.4
George Machin	Labour	1973 Dundee East by-election	14,411	32.7
Roy Jenkins	SDP	1982 Glasgow Hillhead by-election	10,106	33.4
Guy Barnett	Labour	1962 South Dorset by-election	13,783	33.5
Alistair Strathern	Labour	2023 Mid Bedfordshire by-election	13,872	34.1
James Carmichael	Ind. Labour Party	1946 Glasgow Bridgeton by-election	6,351	34.3
Leah Manning	Labour	1931 Islington East by-election	10,591	34.7
Kenneth Lindsay	National Labour	1933 Kilmarnock by-election	12,577	34.8
Parmjit Singh Gill	Liberal Democrats	2004 Leicester South by-election	10,274	34.9

The 1920 Stockport by-election was held to elect two MPs. The winners' shares of the total vote were 25.6% and 25.1%. However, as each voter could cast two votes, the situation is not readily comparable to other by-elections in this period.

At the 1909 Sheffield Attercliffe by-election, the winning candidate took only 27.5% of the vote.

=== Lowest share of the vote ===
==== Major parties ====
Major parties winning 2% or less share of votes cast in a by-election, since 1918:

Candidate	Party	Election	Votes	% Share
Jake Austin	Liberal Democrats	2026 Makerfield by-election	163	0.4
Melvin Witherden	Plaid Cymru^{1}	1991 Monmouth by-election	227	0.6
Geoff Juby	Liberal Democrats	2014 Rochester and Strood by-election	349	0.9
Lee Dargue	Liberal Democrats	2022 Birmingham Erdington by-election	173	1.0
Stephen Arrundale	Liberal Democrats	2021 Airdrie and Shotts by-election	220	1.0
Andrew Hagon	Liberal Democrats	2021 Hartlepool by-election	349	1.2
Roger Goodfellow	Liberal	1948 Glasgow Camlachie by-election	312	1.2
James Scott Duckers	Liberal	1924 Westminster Abbey by-election	291	1.3
Andrew Graham	Liberal Democrats	2014 Clacton by-election	483	1.3
Hugh Annand	Liberal Democrats	2013 South Shields by-election	352	1.4
Robert McCreadie	Liberal Democrats	1989 Glasgow Central by-election	411	1.5
Sunny Virk	Liberal Democrats	2023 Tamworth by-election	417	1.6
Natasa Pantelic	Labour	2021 Chesham and Amersham by-election	622	1.6
Patrick Davies	Labour	1997 Winchester by-election	944	1.7
Blaise Baquiche	Liberal Democrats	2023 Uxbridge and South Ruislip by-election	526	1.7
Jackie Pearcey	Liberal Democrats	2026 Gorton and Denton by-election	653	1.8
Ian Miller	Liberal	1967 Glasgow Pollok by-election	735	1.9
Charlotte Cadden	Conservative	2026 Gorton and Denton by-election	706	1.9
Jamie Needle	Liberal Democrats	2022 Wakefield by-election	508	1.9
Steve Billcliffe	Labour	1993 Newbury by-election	1,151	2.0
Michael Winstanley	Conservative	2026 Makerfield by-election	997	2.0

The 'continuing' Social Democratic Party (SDP) took 0.4% of the vote at both the 1990 Upper Bann by-election and the Bootle by-election the following week.
^{1}Joint Plaid/Green Candidate.

==== Candidates winning fewer than ten votes ====
Since 1918: (Note: F. R. Lees, a Temperance Chartist, won no votes in the 1860 Ripon by-election, as his supporters mistakenly believed that he had withdrawn.)

Votes	Name	Affiliation/Label	Election
3	Yolande Kenward	No description	2021 North Shropshire by-election
5	Bill Boaks	Public Safety Democratic Monarchist White Resident	1982 Glasgow Hillhead by-election
5	Smiley Smilie	Independent	2016 Tooting by-election
5	Bobby Smith	No description	2019 Peterborough by-election
5	Kailash Trivedi	Independent Janata Party	1988 Kensington by-election
6	Gary Cooke	No description	2023 Rutherglen and Hamilton West by-election
7	John Connell	Peace - stop ITN manipulation	1984 Chesterfield by-election
7	Glenn Cummings	Independent	2026 Clacton by-election
7	Thomas Darwood	No description	2026 Holborn and St Pancras by-election
8	David Bishop	Church of the Militant Elvis Party	2022 Birmingham Erdington by-election
8	Esmond Bevan	Systems Designer (Note: Bevan put his occupation of "Systems Designer" in the description field of the nomination paper, which appeared on the ballot paper. He was an independent candidate.)	1983 Bermondsey by-election
8	Tony Farnon	Independent	2008 Haltemprice and Howden by-election
8	77 Joseph	Independent	2023 Uxbridge and South Ruislip by-election
8	Norman Scarth	Independent	2008 Haltemprice and Howden by-election
8	Paul Gould	Independent	2026 Makerfield by-election
8	Woke Trump Carrzee	Independent	2026 Clacton by-election
9	Bobby Smith	Bring Back Elmo	2016 Tooting by-election
9	Gerry Smith	Independent	2026 Clacton by-election
9	Jonathan Silberman	Communist League	2026 Holborn and St Pancras by-election

=== Smallest majorities ===
All majorities of less than 1,000 since the Second World War. Bold entries indicate a new record.

Votes	Election	Result
6	**2025 Runcorn and Helsby by-election**	Reform gain
57	**1973 Berwick-upon-Tweed by-election**	Liberal gain
62	**1967 Walthamstow West by-election**	Conservative gain
100	1986 West Derbyshire by-election	Conservative hold
205	**1965 Leyton by-election**	Conservative gain
219	**1958 Torrington by-election**	Liberal gain
220	1962 Central Norfolk by-election	Conservative hold
264	1977 Ashfield by-election	Conservative gain
289	1982 Birmingham Northfield by-election	Labour gain
293	**1950 Dunbartonshire West by-election**	Labour hold
323	2021 Batley and Spen by-election	Labour hold
359	**1946 Combined English Universities by-election**	Conservative gain
365	2008 Glasgow East by-election	SNP gain
395	1948 Glasgow Camlachie by-election	Unionist gain
430	1980 Southend East by-election	Conservative hold
437	1950 Brighouse and Spenborough by-election	Labour hold
452	**1946 Heywood and Radcliffe by-election**	Labour hold
460	2004 Birmingham Hodge Hill by-election	Labour hold
478	1969 Swindon by-election	Conservative gain
495	2023 Uxbridge and South Ruislip by-election	Conservative hold
517	1969 Paddington North by-election	Labour hold
520	1977 Grimsby by-election	Labour hold
552	1983 Penrith and The Border by-election	Conservative hold
556	1999 Hamilton South by-election	Labour hold
557	1967 Manchester Gorton by-election	Labour hold
559	1985 Brecon and Radnor by-election	Liberal gain
571	1973 Glasgow Govan by-election	SNP gain
617	2014 Heywood and Middleton by-election	Labour hold
633	2006 Bromley and Chislehurst by-election	Conservative hold
641	1960 Bolton East by-election	Conservative hold
657	1956 Taunton by-election	Conservative hold
666	1960 Brighouse and Spenborough by-election	Conservative gain
683	2019 Peterborough by-election	Labour hold
704	1962 South Dorset by-election	Labour gain
705	2000 Falkirk West by-election	Labour hold
740	1968 Bassetlaw by-election	Labour hold
799	1986 Newcastle-under-Lyme by-election	Labour hold
806	1955 Mid Ulster by-election	Sinn Féin hold
815	1988 Kensington by-election	Conservative hold
822	2000 South Antrim by-election	DUP gain
865	1955 South Norfolk by-election	Conservative hold
913	1950 Belfast West by-election	UUP hold
917	1962 South Northamptonshire by-election	Conservative hold
946	1973 Ripon by-election	Liberal gain
971	1963 Dumfriesshire by-election	Unionist hold
973	1962 Blackpool North by-election	Conservative hold

Other very small majorities have been recorded since 1918. The majority in the 1921 Penrith and Cockermouth by-election was only 31 votes, and in the 1924 Westminster Abbey by-election, it was 43 votes, while at the 1928 Carmarthen by-election it was 47 votes. At the 1892 Cirencester by-election, a majority of 3 for the Unionists was overturned on petition, where it was found that both candidates had an equal number of votes. A fresh by-election was called, which was won by the Liberals. The 1830 Liverpool by-election saw a majority of 29 votes.

=== Turnout ===
Turnout is the percentage of registered electors who voted.

==== Highest turnout ====
The highest turnouts since 1918.

By-election	Year	Turnout %
1969 Mid Ulster by-election	1969	91.5%
1955 Mid Ulster by-election	1955	89.7%
1928 Ashton-under-Lyne by-election	1928	89.1%
1981 (August) Fermanagh and South Tyrone by-election	1981	88.6%
1956 Mid Ulster by-election	1956	88.4%
1923 Tiverton by-election	1923	88.1%
1926 Darlington by-election	1926	87.6%
1957 Carmarthen by-election	1957	87.4%
1981 (April) Fermanagh and South Tyrone by-election	1981	86.9%
1925 Stockport by-election	1925	85.7%
1950 Brighouse and Spenborough by-election	1950	85.4%

==== Turnout increased from general election ====
It is highly unusual for a by-election to attract a higher turnout in a seat than the previous general election.

By-election	Turnout %	Turnout % at general election	Increase %
1936 Ross and Cromarty by-election	65.2	50.8	14.4
1958 Torrington by-election	80.6	69.2	11.4
1938 Bridgwater by-election	82.3	72.7	9.6
1938 Oxford by-election	76.3	67.3	9.0
1928 Carmarthen by-election	76.6	67.9	8.7
1928 St Ives by-election	77.4	69.1	8.3
1969 Mid Ulster by-election	91.5	83.9	7.6
2026 Makerfield by-election	58.7	52.5	6.3
1958 East Aberdeenshire by-election	65.9	59.8	6.1
1926 Kingston upon Hull Central by-election	82.8	77.1	5.7
1927 Bosworth by-election	84.6	80.8	3.8
1927 Leith by-election	73.9	70.5	3.4
1932 Cardiganshire by-election	70.4	67.5	2.9
1929 North Lanarkshire by-election	82.3	79.9	2.4
1957 Carmarthen by-election	87.4	85.1	2.3
1948 Paisley by-election	76.0	73.9	2.1
1967 Rhondda West by-election	82.2	80.3	1.9
1948 Croydon North by-election	74.8	73.2	1.6
1981 (August) Fermanagh and South Tyrone by-election	88.6	87.1	1.5
1926 Darlington by-election	87.6	86.1	1.5
1928 Linlithgowshire by-election	81.5	80.0	1.5
1973 Berwick-upon-Tweed by-election	75.0	73.7	1.3
1970 South Ayrshire by-election	76.3	75.1	1.2
1955 Mid Ulster by-election	89.7	88.6	1.1
1948 Wigan by-election	81.4	80.4	1.0
1986 Newry and Armagh by-election	76.9	76.0	0.9
1928 Ashton-under-Lyne by-election	89.1	88.3	0.8
1977 Great Grimsby by-election	70.2	69.4	0.8
1938 Ipswich by-election	82.8	82.1	0.7
1982 Glasgow Hillhead by-election	76.4	75.7	0.7
1938 Walsall by-election	75.9	75.2	0.7
1958 Argyll by-election	67.1	66.6	0.5
1987 Greenwich by-election	68.2	67.7	0.5
1926 Smethwick by-election	78.6	78.2	0.4
1967 Hamilton by-election	73.7	73.3	0.4
1971 Macclesfield by-election	76.6	76.4	0.2

==== Lowest turnout ====
During the Second World War the electoral register was not kept up to date despite significant population movements, especially in the London area (which contains all three constituencies in the first list below). Consequently, only those eligible to vote in the constituency at the outbreak of war were eligible to vote in the by-elections, and many of those were physically unable to vote, as they were located elsewhere; in addition the major parties did not compete against each other. The lowest turnout in peacetime since 1918 was 18.2% at the 2012 Manchester Central by-election. The lowest turnouts since 1918 have been:

- 1942 Poplar South by-election: 8.5%
- 1941 Harrow by-election: 10.7%
- 1944 Camberwell North by-election: 11.2%

Turnouts of less than 30% since 1945 (bold indicates a new post-war record)

By-election	Turnout %
**2012 Manchester Central by-election**	18.2%
**1999 Leeds Central by-election**	19.6%
2022 Southend West by-election	24.0%
**1958 Shoreditch and Finsbury by-election**	24.9%
1999 Wigan by-election	25.0%
2000 Tottenham by-election	25.4%
2012 Cardiff South and Penarth by-election	25.7%
2016 Batley and Spen by-election	25.8%
2022 Stretford and Urmston by-election	25.8%
1974 Newham South by-election	25.9%
2012 Middlesbrough by-election	26.0%
2012 Croydon North by-election	26.5%
2022 Birmingham Erdington by-election	27.0%
2000 West Bromwich West by-election	27.6%
2011 Feltham and Heston by-election	28.8%
2000 Preston by-election	29.6%
1999 Kensington and Chelsea by-election	29.7%

=== Most candidates ===
Under current UK electoral law there is no upper or lower limit for candidature numbers, with the only required stipulation being the valid nomination of ten electors from the constituency. By-elections often attract "fringe" or novelty candidates, single-issue candidates, or independents. As with nominations in a general election, candidates must pay a £500 deposit, which is only refunded if the candidate wins 5% of the votes cast.

All by-elections with more than ten candidates are listed. Elections are listed in alphabetical order. Those that created a new record number appear in bold.

The planned 2017 Manchester Gorton by-election had 11 candidates before it was cancelled due to the early 2017 United Kingdom general election.

Year	Number of candidates	Election	Ref
2026	34	**Clacton**	
2008	26	**Haltemprice and Howden**	
1993	19	**Newbury**	
1999	18	Kensington and Chelsea	
2023	17	Uxbridge and South Ruislip	
1984	17	**Chesterfield**	
2021	16	Batley and Spen	
1983	16	**Bermondsey**	
2003	16	Brent East	
2021	16	Hartlepool	
2026	15	Holborn and St Pancras	
1988	15	Kensington	
2019	15	Peterborough	
2025	15	Runcorn and Helsby	
2022	15	Wakefield	
1993	14	Christchurch	
2012	14	Corby	
2013	14	Eastleigh	
2004	14	Hartlepool	
2018	14	Lewisham East	
2026	14	Makerfield	
1990	14	Mid Staffordshire	
2021	14	North Shropshire	
2023	14	Rutherglen and Hamilton West	
2016	14	Tooting	
1989	14	Vauxhall	
2016	14	Witney	
2009	13	Glasgow North East	
2023	13	Mid Bedfordshire	
2014	13	Rochester and Strood	
2023	13	Selby and Ainsty	
1996	13	South East Staffordshire	
2022	12	Birmingham Erdington	
2012	12	Croydon North	
1981	12	**Croydon North West**	
2003	12	Ealing Southall	
1999	12	Hamilton South	
2008	12	Henley	
2012	12	Manchester Central	
2009	12	Norwich North	
1997	12	Wirral South	
2006	11	Bromley and Chislehurst	
1986	11	Fulham	
2026	11	Gorton and Denton	
1978	11	**Lambeth Central**	
2004	11	Leicester South	
2014	11	Newark	
2019	11	Newport West	
2021	11	Old Bexley and Sidcup	
2024	11	Rochdale	
2012	11	Rotherham	
2007	11	Sedgefield	
1990	11	Upper Bann	
1997	11	Uxbridge	
1989	11	Vale of Glamorgan	
1981	11	Warrington	
2024	11	Wellingborough	
2016	10	Batley and Spen	
1977	10	Birmingham Ladywood	
1990	10	Bradford North	
1977	10	**City of London and Westminster South**	
2008	10	Crewe and Nantwich	
1994	10	Dudley West	
1996	10	Hemsworth	
1995	10	Littleborough and Saddleworth	
2005	10	Livingston	
2002	10	Ogmore	
2010	10	Oldham East and Saddleworth	
2016	10	Sleaford and North Hykeham	
2017	10	Stoke-on-Trent Central	

=== Fewest candidates ===
Year	Number of candidates	Election
1954	1 (uncontested)	Armagh
1953	1 (uncontested)	North Down
1952	1 (uncontested)	North Antrim
1951	1 (uncontested)	Londonderry
1946	1 (uncontested)	Hemsworth^{1}
1986	2	Eight of the Northern Ireland by-elections^{2}
1981	2	Fermanagh and South Tyrone
1971	2	Widnes^{1}
1986	3	Ryedale

*^{1} The most recent mainland UK instance only is given.
*^{2} Four of these eight were between the Unionist incumbent and a "paper candidate" using the name "Peter Barry", the name of the Irish Minister of Foreign Affairs.

== Candidate records ==
=== Durable by-election candidates ===
==== Major parties ====
Former Labour cabinet minister Tony Benn contested no fewer than four by-elections during his career, topping the poll on each occasion: Bristol South East in 1950, 1961 and 1963, and Chesterfield in 1984. His first and last by-election victories were 33 years and 3 months apart.

Former cabinet minister and European Commissioner Roy Jenkins fought two different by-elections for the Social Democratic Party only eight months apart. He narrowly failed in the 1981 Warrington by-election before winning the 1982 Glasgow Hillhead by-election. He had been first elected as a Labour MP almost 34 years previously in the 1948 Southwark Central by-election.

Former Speaker of the House of Commons, Betty Boothroyd finally secured election at her third by-election attempt at the 1973 West Bromwich by-election. She had previously failed in the 1957 Leicester South East by-election and the 1968 Nelson and Colne by-election as well as the general elections of 1959 and 1970.

John Bickley of UKIP contested three by-elections (all in Greater Manchester) within two years - Wythenshawe and Sale East in February 2014, Heywood and Middleton in October 2014 and Oldham West and Royton in December 2015. He was defeated on each occasion, coming closest in Heywood and Middleton where he lost by less than 700 votes. Bickley also contested Heywood and Middleton at the 2015 general election, making a total of four parliamentary elections contested in fewer than 24 months.

==== Minor parties and independents ====
Perennial fringe candidates include such personalities as Bill Boaks, who ran in 19 by-elections. His highest vote was at the 1982 Beaconsfield by-election with 99 votes. Screaming Lord Sutch was for most of his career the leader of the Official Monster Raving Loony Party, and competed in 34 by-elections (1 for the National Teenage Party) between 1963 and 1997. His highest vote total was 1,114 at the 1994 Rotherham by-election. Lindi St Clair of the Corrective Party contested eleven by-elections without success, her highest total being 216 votes as 'Lady Whiplash' at the 1990 Eastbourne by-election. Sutch's successor as leader of the Official Monster Raving Loony Party, Alan "Howling Laud" Hope, has, as of the 2026 Makerfield by-election, contested twenty-six by-elections.

Under various ballot paper descriptions, David Bishop of the Church of the Militant Elvis label stood at seven by-elections, receiving 99 votes at the 2012 Corby by-election, an increase over his previous high of 93 at the 2011 Feltham and Heston by-election.

On 23 January 1986, Wesley Robert Williamson (who changed his name to Peter Barry) stood in four simultaneous by-elections in Northern Ireland.

==== Pre-1945 ====
Arthur Henderson was distinguished in being successful in no fewer than five by-elections in different seats, in Barnard Castle, Widnes, Newcastle upon Tyne East, Burnley, and Clay Cross.

Joseph Gibbins is the only person in modern times to gain the same seat twice in two different by-elections. He triumphed for Labour in the 1924 and 1935 Liverpool West Toxteth by-elections.

William O'Brien won four by-elections, in Mallow in 1883, North East Cork in 1887 and then Cork City in 1904 and 1914. On these last two occasions, he was re-elected having resigned the seat.

Prime Minister Winston Churchill contested five by-elections in his long career:

- 1899 Oldham by-election in which he was not elected
- 1908 Manchester North West by-election where he was defeated
- 1908 Dundee by-election where he was elected
- 1917 Dundee by-election where he was re-elected.
- 1924 Westminster Abbey by-election in which he was unsuccessful

John Wilkes won the 1757 Aylesbury by-election, and was then elected in the Middlesex by-elections of February, March and April 1769, on each occasion being subsequently expelled from the House of Commons.

Charles Bradlaugh was elected in the 1880 general election to Northampton and then won by-elections in 1881, 1882 and 1884 to the same seat, having been removed or resigned from the Commons in an argument over his atheism and refusal to take the Oath.

=== Former MPs making a comeback at a by-election ===
Election	MP	Party	notes
2026 Makerfield by-election	Andy Burnham	Labour	returns after a spell as the Mayor of Greater Manchester. He had previously been the MP for neighbouring Leigh from 2001 to 2017.
2024 Rochdale by-election^{1}	George Galloway	Workers Party	returns after losing Bradford West in the 2015 general election, and failing to win Manchester Gorton in 2017, West Bromwich East in 2019 and Batley and Spen in 2021
2012 Bradford West by-election^{1}	George Galloway	Respect	returns after failing to win a seat in the 2010 general election.
2000 South Antrim by-election^{1}	William McCrea	DUP	returns after losing his Mid Ulster seat in the 1997 general election.
1999 Kensington and Chelsea by-election	Michael Portillo	Conservative	returns after losing his Enfield Southgate seat at the 1997 general election.
1997 Beckenham by-election	Jacqui Lait	Conservative	returns after losing her Hastings and Rye seat at the 1997 general election.
1988 Epping Forest by-election	Steve Norris	Conservative	returns after losing his Oxford East seat at the 1987 general election.
1988 Glasgow Govan by-election^{1}	Jim Sillars	SNP	He had first sat as a Labour MP (later as Scottish Labour) for South Ayrshire between 1970 and 1979.
1984 Chesterfield by-election	Tony Benn	Labour	returns after losing his redrawn Bristol East seat at the 1983 general election.
1982 Beaconsfield by-election	Tim Smith	Conservative	returns after losing his Ashfield seat in the 1979 general election.
1982 Glasgow Hillhead by-election^{2}:	Roy Jenkins	SDP	returns after a spell as European Commissioner, then co-founding the Social Democratic Party (SDP). He had first sat as a Labour MP for Southwark Central from 1948 to 1950 and Birmingham Stechford from 1950 to 1977.
1981 Crosby by-election^{1}	Shirley Williams	SDP	returns as the first-elected SDP MP. She had first sat as a Labour MP for Hitchin 1964-74 and for Hertford and Stevenage 1974–79
1981 Warrington by-election	Douglas Hoyle	Labour	returns after losing his Nelson and Colne seat in the 1979 general election.
1980 Southend East by-election	Teddy Taylor	Conservative	returns after losing his Glasgow Cathcart seat at the 1979 general election
1979 South West Hertfordshire by-election	Richard Page	Conservative	returns after losing his Workington seat in the 1979 general election
1979 Knutsford by-election	Jock Bruce-Gardyne	Conservative	returns after losing his South Angus seat at the October 1974 general election.
1979 Clitheroe by-election	David Waddington	Conservative	returns after losing his Nelson and Colne seat at the October 1974 general election.
1978 Glasgow Garscadden by-election	Donald Dewar	Labour	returns after losing his Aberdeen South seat in the 1970 general election.
1977 Saffron Walden by-election	Alan Haselhurst	Conservative	returns after losing his Middleton and Prestwich seat in the February 1974 general election.
1974 Newham South by-election	Nigel Spearing	Labour	returns after losing his Acton seat in the February 1974 general election.
1972 Merthyr Tydfil by-election^{2}	Edward Rowlands	Labour	returns after losing his Cardiff North seat in the 1970 general election.
1971 Greenwich by-election	Guy Barnett	Labour	returns after losing his South Dorset seat in the 1964 general election.
1971 Southampton Itchen by-election	Bob Mitchell	Labour	returns after losing his Southampton Test seat in the 1970 general election.
1970 St Marylebone by-election	Kenneth Baker	Conservative	returns after losing his Acton seat in the 1970 general election.
1969 Chichester by-election	Christopher Chataway	Conservative	returns after losing his Lewisham North seat in the 1966 general election.
1969 Brighton Pavilion by-election	Julian Amery	Conservative	returns after losing his Preston North seat in the 1966 general election.
1968 New Forest by-election	Patrick McNair-Wilson	Conservative	returns after losing his Lewisham West seat in the 1966 general election.
1968 Warwick and Leamington by-election	Dudley Smith	Conservative	returns after losing his Brentford and Chiswick seat in the 1966 general election.
1967 West Derbyshire by-election	James Scott-Hopkins	Conservative	returns after losing his Cornwall North seat in the 1966 general election.
1967 Brierley Hill by-election	Fergus Montgomery	Conservative	returns after losing his Newcastle upon Tyne East seat in the 1964 general election.
1967 Honiton by-election	Peter Emery	Conservative	returns after losing his Reading seat in the 1966 general election.
1965 Saffron Walden by-election	Peter Kirk	Conservative	returns after losing his Gravesend seat in the 1964 general election.
1965 Salisbury by-election	Michael Hamilton	Conservative	returns after losing his Wellingborough seat in the 1964 general election.
1965 East Grinstead by-election	Geoffrey Johnson-Smith	Conservative	returns after losing his Holborn and St. Pancras South seat in the 1964 general election.
1965 Altrincham and Sale by-election	Anthony Barber	Conservative	returns after losing his Doncaster seat in the 1964 general election.
1963 St Marylebone by-election	Quintin Hogg	Conservative	returns after disclaiming his peerage. He had previously sat for Oxford 1938–1950.
1963 Kinross and Western Perthshire by-election	Sir Alec Douglas-Home	Unionist	returns after disclaiming his peerage. He had previously sat for Lanark 1931-45 and 1950–51.
1963 Bristol South East by-election	Tony Benn	Labour	returns after disclaiming his peerage. He had been disqualified after the death of his father in 1960, and his election in a 1961 by-election had been adjudged undue on petition.
1962 Middlesbrough East by-election	Arthur Bottomley	Labour	returns after losing his Rochester and Chatham seat in the 1959 general election.
1960 Ebbw Vale by-election	Michael Foot	Labour	returns after losing his Plymouth Devonport seat in the 1955 general election.
1956 Newport by-election	Frank Soskice	Labour	returns after his Sheffield Neepsend seat was abolished at the 1955 general election.
1950 Sheffield Neepsend by-election	Frank Soskice	Labour	returns after his Birkenhead East seat was abolished at the 1950 general election.
1933 Clay Cross by-election	Arthur Henderson	Labour	returns after losing his Burnley seat in the 1931 general election.
1924 Burnley by-election	Arthur Henderson	Labour	returns after losing his Newcastle-upon-Tyne East seat in the 1923 general election.
1923 Newcastle-upon-Tyne East by-election	Arthur Henderson	Labour	returns after losing his Widnes seat in the 1922 general election.
1919 Widnes by-election^{1}	Arthur Henderson	Labour	returns after losing his Barnard Castle seat in the 1918 general election.
1913 Houghton-le-Spring by-election^{1}	Thomas Edward Wing	Liberal	returns after losing his Grimsby seat at the December 1910 general election.
1911 Bootle by-election	Bonar Law	Conservative	returns after failing to win Manchester North-West in the December 1910 general election.
1908 Dundee by-election	Winston Churchill	Liberal	returns after losing his Manchester North West seat in a 1908 by-election, upon his appointment to the Board of Trade.
1906 Dulwich by-election	Bonar Law	Conservative	returns after losing his Glasgow Blackfriars and Hutchesontown seat in the 1906 general election.
February 1906 City of London by-election	Arthur Balfour	Conservative	returns after losing his Manchester East seat in the 1906 general election.

Notes:

^{1} by-election gain lost at the subsequent general election

^{2} by-election gain held at the subsequent general election

==== Former MPs failing in a by-election ====
Election	Ex-MP	Party	Notes	Result	Votes
2026 Holborn and St Pancras by-election	George Galloway	Workers Party	Former Labour (1987–2003), Independent (2003–2004) and Respect (2004–2005) MP for Glasgow Kelvin (previously Glasgow Hillhead), and Respect MP for Bethnal Green and Bow (2005–2010) and Bradford West (2012–2015), and Workers Party MP for Rochdale (2024).	7th of 15	314 (1.2%)
2026 Aberdeen South by-election	Richard Thomson	SNP	Former MP for Gordon (2019–2024).	2nd of 6	8,258 (28.6%)
2024 Rochdale by-election	Simon Danczuk	Reform	Former Labour (2010–2015) and Independent (2015–2017) MP for the seat.	6th of 11	1,968 (6.3%)
2022 Birmingham Erdington by-election	Dave Nellist	TUSC	Former Labour (1983–1991) and Independent (1991–1992) MP for Coventry South East.	3rd of 12	360 (2.1%)
2021 Batley and Spen by-election	George Galloway	Workers Party	Former Labour (1987–2003), Independent (2003–2004) and Respect (2004–2005) MP for Glasgow Kelvin (previously Glasgow Hillhead), and Respect MP for Bethnal Green and Bow (2005–2010) and Bradford West (2012–2015). Galloway later won the 2024 Rochdale by-election.	3rd of 16	8,264 (21.9%)
2021 Hartlepool by-election	Paul Williams	Labour	Former MP for Stockton South (2017–2019).	2nd of 16	8,589 (28.7%)
2021 Hartlepool by-election	Thelma Walker	Independent	Former Labour MP for Colne Valley (2017–2019).	8th of 16	250 (0.8%)
2021 Hartlepool by-election	Hilton Dawson	North East	Former Labour MP for Lancaster and Wyre (1997–2005).	10th of 16	163 (0.5%)
2019 Brecon and Radnorshire by-election	Chris Davies	Conservative	Outgoing MP (since 2015), having been removed by a recall petition.	2nd of 6	12,401 (39.0%)
2019 Newport West by-election	Neil Hamilton	UKIP	Former Conservative MP for Tatton (1983–1997).	3rd of 11	2,023 (8.6%)
2016 Richmond Park by-election	Zac Goldsmith	Independent	Outgoing Conservative MP (since 2010), having resigned in protest at Heathrow Airport expansion. Goldsmith re-gained the seat at the 2017 general election.	2nd of 8	18,638 (45.2%)
2008 Haltemprice and Howden by-election	Walter Sweeney	Independent	Former Conservative MP for Vale of Glamorgan (1992–1997).	8th of 26	238 (1.0%)
2005 Cheadle by-election	Stephen Day	Conservative	Former MP for the seat (1987–2001).	2nd of 5	15,936 (42.4%)
1997 Winchester by-election	Gerry Malone	Conservative	Former MP for the seat (1992–1997), and before that Aberdeen South (1983–1987). The previous election result, in which Malone lost the seat by 2 votes, had been voided, prompting the by-election.	2nd of 8	15,450 (28.4%)
1993 Christchurch by-election	Robert Hayward	Conservative	Former MP for Kingswood (1983–1992).	2nd of 14	16,737 (31.4%)
1990 Eastbourne by-election	Richard Hickmet	Conservative	Former MP for Glanford and Scunthorpe (1983–1987).	2nd of 8	18,865 (41.0%)
1989 Pontypridd by-election	Tom Ellis	SLD	Former Labour Party (1970–1981) and SDP (1981–83) MP for Wrexham.	4th of 7	1,500 (3.9%)
1986 Fermanagh and South Tyrone by-election	Owen Carron	Sinn Féin	Former MP for the seat (1981–1983).	2nd of 4	15,278 (27.2%)
1986 Newry and Armagh by-election	Jim Nicholson	UUP	Outgoing MP (since 1983), having resigned his seat (along with all other Unionist MPs) in protest at the Anglo-Irish Agreement.	2nd of 4	20,111 (40.3%)
1982 Peckham by-election	Dick Taverne	SDP	Former Labour (1951–1973) and Democratic Labour (1973–1974) MP for Lincoln.	2nd of 5	7,418 (32.9%)
1982 Gower by-election	Gwynoro Jones	SDP	Former Labour MP for Carmarthen (1970–1974).	2nd of 6	9,875 (25.1%)
1982 Beaconsfield by-election	Paul Tyler	Liberal	Former Labour MP for Bodmin (February–September 1974). Tyler was later MP for North Cornwall.	2nd of 6	9,996 (26.8%)
1981 Warrington by-election	Roy Jenkins	SDP	Former Labour MP for Southwark Central (1948–1950) and Birmingham Stechford (1950–1977). Jenkins was later MP for Glasgow Hillhead.	2nd of 11	12,521 (42.4%)
April 1981 Fermanagh and South Tyrone by-election	Harry West	UUP	Former MP for the seat (February–September 1974).	2nd of 2	29,046 (48.8%)
1978 Hamilton by-election	Margo MacDonald	SNP	Former MP for Glasgow Govan (1973–1974).	2nd of 4	12,388 (33.4%)
1978 Ilford North by-election	Tom Iremonger	Conservative Independent Democrat	Former Conservative MP for the seat (1954–1974).	5th of 8	671 (1.5%)
1977 Birmingham Stechford by-election	Terry Davis	Labour	Former MP for Bromsgrove (1971–1974). Davis would later be MP for Birmingham Stechford and successor seat Birmingham Hodge Hill.	2nd of 6	13,782 (38.0%)
1976 Walsall North by-election	David Winnick	Labour	Former MP for Croydon South (1966–1970). Winnick won the seat at the 1979 general election.	2nd of 9	11,833 (31.6%)
1971 Liverpool Scotland by-election	Peter Mahon	Labour and Anti-Abortion	Former Labour Party MP for Preston South (1964–1970).	3rd of 3	981 (10.3%)
1969 Brighton Pavilion by-election	Thomas Skeffington-Lodge	Labour	Former MP for Bedford (1945–1950).	2nd of 3	4,654 (18.6%)
1967 Nuneaton by-election	Don Bennett	National Party	Former Liberal Party MP for Middlesbrough West (May–July 1945). Bennett had previously stood unsuccessfully in the 1948 Croydon North by-election.	5th of 5	517 (1.2%)
1965 Salisbury by-election	Horace Trevor-Cox	Ind. Conservative	Former Conservative Party MP for Stalybridge and Hyde (1937–1945).	4th of 4	533 (1.5%)
1965 Leyton by-election	Patrick Gordon Walker	Labour	Former MP for Smethwick (1945–1964). Gordon Walker won the seat at the 1966 general election.	2nd of 5	16,339 (42.4%)
1962 South Dorset by-election	Angus Maude	Conservative	Former MP for Ealing South (1950–1958). Maude later won the 1963 Stratford by-election.	2nd of 7	13,079 (31.8%)
1960 Bolton East by-election	Frank Byers	Liberal	Former MP for North Dorset (1945–1950).	3rd of 4	10,173 (24.8%)
1956 Hereford by-election	Frank Owen	Liberal	Former MP for the seat (1929–1931).	2nd of 3	9,979 (36.4%)
1956 Mid Ulster by-election	Michael O'Neill	Anti-Partition	Former Independent Nationalist MP for the seat (1951–1955).	3rd of 3	6,421 (10.9%)
1948 Croydon North by-election	Harold Nicolson	Labour	Former National Labour MP for Leicester West (1935–1945).	2nd of 3	24,536 (36.6%)
1948 Croydon North by-election	Don Bennett	Liberal	Former MP for Middlesbrough West (May–July 1945). Bennett would later stand unsuccessfully in the 1967 Nuneaton by-election.	3rd of 3	6,321 (9.4%)
1941 Hampstead by-election	Noel Pemberton Billing	National	Former Independent MP for Hertford (1916–1921).	2nd of 4	2,734 (24.1%)
1941 The Wrekin by-election	Noel Pemberton Billing	National	Former Independent MP for Hertford (1916–1921).	2nd of 3	7,121 (38.1%)
1941 Dudley by-election	Noel Pemberton Billing	National	Former Independent MP for Hertford (1916–1921).	2nd of 2	4,869 (43.9%)
1941 Hornsey by-election	Noel Pemberton Billing	National	Former Independent MP for Hertford (1916–1921).	2nd of 2	4,146 (27.2%)
1924 Westminster Abbey by-election	Winston Churchill	Constitutionalist	Former Conservative (1900–1904) and Liberal (1904–1906) MP for Oldham, and Liberal MP for Manchester North West (1906–1908) and Dundee (1908–1922). Churchill would later become MP for Epping and eventually became Prime Minister of the United Kingdom.	2nd of 4	8,144 (35.8%)
1923 Anglesey by-election	Edward John	Labour	Former Liberal MP for East Denbighshire (1910–1918).	2nd of 3	6,368 (30.5%)
1921 Woolwich East by-election	Ramsay MacDonald	Labour	Former MP for Leicester (1906–1918). MacDonald would later become MP for Aberavon and eventually became Prime Minister of the United Kingdom.	2nd of 2	13,041 (48.7%)
1921 Westminster Abbey by-election	Arnold Lupton	Liberal	Former MP for Sleaford (1906–1910).	3rd of 3	3,053 (21.5%)
1921 Cardiganshire by-election	W. Llewelyn Williams	Liberal	Former MP for Carmarthen Boroughs (1906–1918).	2nd of 2	10,521 (42.7%)
1920 Dartford by-election	Thomas Wing	Liberal	Former MP for Grimsby (January–December 1910) and Houghton-le-Spring (1913–1918).	2nd of 5	4,562 (16.8%)

===== Re-election of ministers =====
Until the Re-election of Ministers Acts 1919 and 1926 there were many cases of members having to seek re-election on appointment to ministerial office. In eight instances since 1900 they were unsuccessful:

Election	Minister	Party	notes	Result	Votes
1922 Pontypridd by-election	Thomas Arthur Lewis	Liberal	MP since 1918, had been appointed a Junior Lord of the Treasury. Lewis later became MP for University of Wales.	2nd of 2	12,550 (43.0%)
1921 Dudley by-election	Arthur Griffith-Boscawen	Unionist	MP since 1910 (and previously MP for Tunbridge from 1892 to 1906), had been appointed Minister of Agriculture. Griffith-Boscawen won the 1921 Taunton by-election a month later.	2nd of 2	9,968 (49.3%)
1914 Ipswich by-election	Charles Masterman	Liberal	MP for Bethnal Green South West since 1911 (and previously MP for West Ham North from 1906 to 1910), had been appointed Chancellor of the Duchy of Lancaster. After losing in Bethnal Green, Masterman stood in the Ipswich election three months later before resigning after that defeat.	2nd of 3	5,874 (46.3%)
1914 Bethnal Green South West by-election	Charles Masterman	Liberal	MP for Bethnal Green South West since 1911 (and previously MP for West Ham North from 1906 to 1910), had been appointed Chancellor of the Duchy of Lancaster. After losing in Bethnal Green, Masterman stood in the Ipswich election three months later before resigning after that defeat.	2nd of 3	2,804 (47.1%)
1912 Manchester South by-election	Arthur Haworth	Liberal	MP since 1906, had been appointed a Junior Lord of the Treasury.	2nd of 2	6,472 (47.9%)
1911 North Ayrshire by-election	Andrew Anderson	Liberal	MP since 1910, had been appointed Solicitor General for Scotland.	2nd of 2	7,047 (49.1%)
1908 Manchester North West by-election	Winston Churchill	Liberal	MP since 1906 (and previously MP for Oldham from 1900 to 1906), had been appointed President of the Board of Trade. Churchill won the 1908 Dundee by-election two weeks later.	2nd of 3	4,988 (46.7%)
1905 Brighton by-election	Gerald Loder	Liberal	MP since 1889, had been appointed Lord Commissioner of the Treasury.	2nd of 2	7,392 (47.4%)

=== Shortest-serving by-election victors ===
Note this list covers completed service only; it excludes any current MPs.

==== Since 1945 ====
Member of Parliament	By-election	Party	Duration (days)
Bobby Sands	1981 (April) Fermanagh and South Tyrone by-election	Anti H-Block	25^{1}
Michael Carr	1990 (May) Bootle by-election	Labour	57^{1}
Oswald O'Brien	1983 Darlington by-election	Labour	77^{2}
George Galloway	2024 Rochdale by-election	Workers Party	92^{2b}
Margo MacDonald	1973 Glasgow Govan by-election	SNP	92^{2}
Jane Dodds	2019 Brecon and Radnorshire by-election	Liberal Democrats	97^{2}
Charles Beattie	1955 Mid Ulster by-election	UUP	123^{3}
Mark Reckless	2014 Rochester and Strood by-election	UKIP	130^{2b}
Lisa Forbes	2019 Peterborough by-election	Labour	153^{2}
Sarah Olney	2016 Richmond Park by-election	Liberal Democrats	153^{2a}
Nicol Stephen	1991 Kincardine and Deeside by-election	Liberal Democrats	154^{2}
Ashok Kumar	1991 Langbaurgh by-election	Labour	154^{2a}
Helen McElhone	1982 Glasgow Queen's Park by-election	Labour	189^{4}
David Austick	1973 Ripon by-election	Liberal	217^{2}
John Spellar	1982 Birmingham Northfield by-election	Labour	224^{2a}
Christopher Ward	1969 Swindon by-election	Conservative	231^{2}
William McCrea	2000 South Antrim by-election	DUP	259^{2ab}
Parmjit Singh Gill	2004 Leicester South by-election	Liberal Democrats	294^{2}
David Colville Anderson	1963 Dumfriesshire by-election	Unionist	309^{5}
Steve Tuckwell	2023 Uxbridge and South Ruislip by-election	Conservative	316^{2}
Huw Edwards	1991 Monmouth by-election	Labour	329^{2a}
Thomas Teevan	1950 Belfast West by-election	UUP	330^{2}
Wallace Lawler	1969 Birmingham Ladywood by-election	Liberal	357^{2}
George Machin	1973 Dundee East by-election	Labour	364^{2}

Notes

- ^{1} died
- ^{2} defeated at next general election
- ^{3} disqualified (Beattie was never elected. He was awarded the seat on the disqualification of his predecessor, only to be found to be disqualified himself)
- ^{4} retired at next general election (seat abolished by redistribution and failed to secure alternative seat)
- ^{5} retired at next general election due to personal difficulties
- ^{a} returned to Parliament at a subsequent election
- ^{b} had served previously as an MP

==== Pre-1945 ====
- Henry Francis Compton, Conservative 1905 New Forest by-election 46 days^{2}
- Ronald Bell, Conservative 1945 Newport by-election 70 days^{2a}
- Donald Bennett, Liberal 1945 Middlesbrough West by-election 73 days^{2}
- John Dumphreys, Conservative 1909 Bermondsey by-election 83 days^{2}
- Seaborne Davies, Liberal 1945 Caernarvon Boroughs by-election 91 days^{2}
- Ruth Dalton, Labour 1929 Bishop Auckland by-election 92 days^{3}
- Joseph Ormond Andrews, Liberal 1905 Barkston Ash by-election 97 days^{2}
- Dr Robert McIntyre, SNP 1945 Motherwell by-election 104 days^{2}
- George Knox Anderson, Conservative 1918 Canterbury by-election 113 days^{3}
- Herbert Evans, Labour 1931 Gateshead by-election 121 days^{1}
- Andrew Clarke, Labour 1929 Midlothian and Peebles Northern by-election 121 days^{2b}
- Sir Henry Wilson, Unionist February 1922 North Down by-election 121 days^{5}
- Joseph Henderson, Labour 1931 Manchester Ardwick by-election 135 days^{2a}
- Evan Cotton, Liberal 1918 Finsbury East by-election 151 days^{2}
- David Hardie, Labour 1931 Rutherglen by-election 159 days^{2}
- Lord Arthur Hill, Unionist 1907 West Down by-election 193 days^{7b}
- Oswald Cawley, Liberal January 1918 Prestwich by-election 202 days^{1}
- Francis Norie-Miller, Liberal National 1935 Perth by-election 212 days^{3}
- George Banton, Labour 1922 Leicester East by-election 230 days^{2a}
- William Henry Somervell, Liberal 1918 Keighley by-election 232 days^{2}
- Noel Edward Buxton, Liberal 1905 Whitby by-election 238 days^{2a}
- Leslie Orme Wilson, Conservative 1922 Portsmouth South by-election 243 days^{7b}
- Leah Manning, Labour 1931 Islington East by-election 250 days^{2a}
- Frederick William Gibbins, Liberal 1910 Mid Glamorgan by-election 253 days^{3}
- C. V. F. Palmer, Independent Conservative February 1920 The Wrekin by-election 261 days^{1}
- Maurice Healy, Ind. Nationalist 1909 Cork City by-election 262 days^{2ab}
- John Edward Sutton, Labour 1922 Manchester Clayton by-election 270 days^{2ab}
- James Chuter Ede, Labour 1923 Mitcham by-election 278 days^{2a}
- J. J. Cleary, Labour 1935 Liverpool Wavertree by-election 281 days^{2}
- Sir William Beveridge, Liberal 1944 Berwick-upon-Tweed by-election 282 days^{2}
- W. P. Sidney, Conservative 1944 Chelsea by-election 288 days^{4}
- Sir John Reith, National February 1940 Southampton by-election 293 days^{6}
- W. E. Gibbons, Conservative 1944 Bilston by-election 309 days^{2}
- Lord Charles Beresford, Conservative 1902 Woolwich by-election 320 days^{7ab}
- Arthur Henderson, Labour 1923 Newcastle-upon-Tyne East by-election 323 days^{2ab}
- James Henry Hall, Labour 1930 Whitechapel and St Georges by-election 328 days^{2a}
- Thomas Naylor, Labour 1921 Southwark South East by-election 336 days^{2a}

^{1} died
^{2} defeated at next general election
^{3} retired at next general election
^{4} retired at next general election, upon succession to a peerage
^{5} assassinated by IRA
^{6} elevated to the Peerage
^{7} resigned
^{a} returned to Parliament at a subsequent election
^{b} had served previously as an MP

=== Youngest by-election victors ===
- Esmond Harmsworth, elected on 15 November 1919 from Isle of Thanet aged 21 years 170 days.
- Youngest woman: Bernadette Devlin, elected on 17 April 1969 from Mid Ulster aged 21 years 359 days.

==== Babies of the House elected at by-elections ====
See Baby of the House of Commons

=== Oldest by-election victors ===
Debuts in Parliament:

- John Benbow was 75 or 76 when he held the 1844 Dudley by-election for the Conservatives.
- Hucks Gibbs was 71 when he held the April 1891 City of London by-election for the Conservatives.
- Philip Manfield was 71 or 72 when he held the 1891 Northampton by-election for the Liberals.
- Sir Robert Pullar was 79 (less 6 days) when he held the 1907 Perth by-election for the Liberals.
- David Cleghorn Hogg was 73 when he gained the 1913 Londonderry City by-election for the Liberals.
- Sir Swire Smith was 73 when he held the 1915 Keighley by-election for the Liberals.
- William Frederick Hicks Beach was 74 when he held the 1916 Tewkesbury by-election for the Conservatives.
- Sir George Reid was 70 when he held the 1916 St George's, Hanover Square by-election for the Conservatives. He was a former Prime Minister of Australia.
- Sir John Fleming was 69 or 70 when he held the 1917 Aberdeen South by-election for the Liberals.
- George Edwards was almost 70 when he gained the 1920 South Norfolk by-election for Labour. He was a former agricultural labourer.
- Henry Armstrong was almost 77 when he held the 1921 Mid Armagh by-election for the Ulster Unionists.
- William Nathaniel Jones was 70 when he held the 1928 Carmarthen by-election for the Liberals.
- Francis Norie-Miller was 76 when he gained the 1935 Perth by-election for the Liberal Nationals.
- James Little was 70 when he held the 1939 Down by-election for the Ulster Unionists.
- John Evans was 70 when he held the 1946 Ogmore by-election for Labour.

Comebacks to Parliament:

- John Blaquiere was 71 when he held the June 1803 Downton by-election for the Tories. He was previously MP for Rye in 1801–02.
- Bartholomew Bouverie was 73 when he held the 1826 Downton by-election for the Tories. He was previously MP for the same seat from 1819 until the general election earlier in 1826.
- Quintin Dick was 71 when he held the 1848 Aylesbury by-election for the Conservatives. He was previously MP for Maldon in 1830–47.
- James William Freshfield was 77 when he won the 1851 Boston by-election for the Conservatives. He was previously MP for Penryn and Falmouth in 1835–41.
- William Johnson Fox was 71 when he held the 1857 Oldham by-election for the Liberals. He was previously MP for the same seat from 1852 until the general election earlier in 1857.
- William Cubitt was 71 when he held the 1862 Andover by-election for the Conservatives. He was previously MP for the same seat in 1847–61.
- John Morgan Cobbett was 71 when he won the 1872 Oldham by-election for the Conservatives. He had been previously MP for the same seat as a Liberal in 1852–65.
- James Patrick Mahon was 79 when he held the 1879 County Clare by-election and 87 when he held the 1887 County Carlow by-election for the Irish Nationalists.
- Isaac Holden was 75 when he held the 1882 West Riding of Yorkshire by-election for the Liberals. He had previously been MP for Knaresborough in 1865–68.
- Sir Wilfrid Lawson was 74 when he held the 1903 Camborne by-election for the Liberals. He had previously been MP for Cockermouth in 1886–1900.
- John Frederick Cheetham was 70 when he won the 1905 Stalybridge by-election for the Liberals. He had served previously as MP for North Derbyshire 1880-85 prior to that seat's abolition.
- Sir Alfred Hopkinson was 74 when he won the 1926 Combined English Universities by-election for the Conservatives. He had previously been MP for Cricklade 1895–98 before resigning.
- Arthur Salter was 70 when he held the 1951 Ormskirk by-election for the Conservatives. He had served previously as MP for Oxford University 1937-50 prior to that seat's abolition.

In defence of a previously held seat:

- Enoch Powell was 73 when he successfully defended his seat at the 1986 South Down by-election for the Ulster Unionists, after a protest resignation against the Anglo-Irish Agreement, although he had been an MP almost continuously since 1950.

=== First women by-election victors ===
The first woman to be elected in a by-election was Nancy Astor, who succeeded her husband at the 1919 Plymouth Sutton by-election, becoming the first woman to take her seat in the House of Commons.

The first woman to gain a seat in a by-election was Susan Lawrence who won the 1926 East Ham North by-election, although she had previously sat for the same seat between 1923 and 1924.^{1}

The first woman to gain a seat ab initio in a by-election was Jennie Lee who won the 1929 North Lanarkshire by-election, at the same time becoming the first woman Baby of the House of Commons.

Note ^{1} Mabel Philipson succeeded her husband at the 1923 Berwick-upon-Tweed by-election. He had been elected as a National Liberal Party candidate. She won as a Conservative so this could arguably be classed as the first gain by a woman.

=== First ethnic minority by-election victors ===
Whilst the first ethnic minority Members of Parliament were elected at general elections as early as the 1890s, it would be almost 100 years before one was returned at a by-election.

The first ethnic minority candidate to be elected in a by-election was Ashok Kumar who gained the 1991 Langbaurgh by-election for Labour.

- David Lammy held the 2000 Tottenham by-election for Labour.
- Mark Hendrick held the 2000 Preston by-election for Labour.
- Parmjit Singh Gill gained the 2004 Leicester South by-election for the Liberal Democrats.
- Seema Malhotra held the 2011 Feltham and Heston by-election for Labour, the first woman to win it.

The first by-election in which all three major-party candidates were from the ethnic minorities was the 2007 Ealing Southall by-election, held by Labour.

=== First by-election victors from specific religions ===
When the UK Parliament was established in 1801, non-Anglicans were prevented from taking their seats as MPs under the Test Act 1672. However, Methodists took communion at Anglican churches until 1795, and some continued to do so, and many Presbyterians were prepared to accept Anglican communion, thus ensuring that members of these creeds were represented in the Parliament. Some Unitarians were also elected.

The first by-election victor (and first ever MP) to be an adherent of the Eastern Orthodox Church was The Honourable Frederick North who was elected in 1792 for Banbury (to succeed his brother who had entered the House of Lords), having converted to the faith the previous year.

The first Catholic by-election victor in the UK Parliament was Daniel O'Connell in the 1828 County Clare by-election. He was not permitted to take his seat. After the Roman Catholic Relief Act 1829 permitted Catholics to sit in parliament, he was elected unopposed at the 1829 County Clare by-election.

The first atheist by-election victor was Charles Bradlaugh, at the 1881 Northampton by-election. As an atheist, Bradlaugh was not allowed to swear the Oath of Allegiance, and the by-election was re-run in 1882 and 1884. Both were also won by Bradlaugh, who eventually was able to take his seat after the 1885 general election.

- David Salomons was the first Jewish by-election victor, at the 1851 Greenwich by-election.
- Terry Rooney was the first Mormon by-election victor, at the 1990 Bradford North by-election.
- Parmjit Singh Gill became the first Sikh by-election victor, at the 2004 Leicester South by-election.
- Virendra Sharma became the first Hindu by-election victor, at the 2007 Ealing Southall by-election.
- Rosena Allin-Khan was the first Muslim by-election victor, at the 2016 Tooting by-election.

=== Physically disabled by-election victors ===
Most physically disabled MPs in the history of the parliament entered in the intakes of general elections. Those known to have been disabled when entering parliament at by-elections are rarer and include:

- John Horne Tooke, who lost sight of an eye in a boyhood fight, won the 1801 Old Sarum by-election.
- Fulk Greville Howard, who lost sight of an eye in the Helder expedition in 1799, won the 1808 Castle Rising by-election.
- Sir William Carr Beresford, who lost sight of an eye in an accident on military service in 1786, won the 1811 County Waterford by-election.
- Samuel Shepherd, increasingly deaf from 1790, won the 1814 Dorchester by-election.
- Arthur MacMurrough Kavanagh, born without hands and feet, won the 1866 Wicklow County by-election.
- Michael Davitt, who lost his right arm in a factory accident in 1857, won the 1882 County Meath by-election, although he was disqualified from sitting because he was in prison.
- Aubrey Herbert, who was almost blind from childhood, won the 1911 South Somerset by-election.
- Mabel Philipson, who lost sight in one eye after a car crash in 1911, who won the 1923 Berwick-upon-Tweed by-election.
- John Dugdale, who was partly deaf from childhood, won the 1941 West Bromwich by-election.
- Violet Bathurst, Lady Apsley, who was left permanently disabled and unable to walk by a hunting accident in 1930, won the 1943 Bristol Central by-election,
- Cecil Manning, who lost his right arm in action in World War I, won the 1944 Camberwell North by-election.
- Hervey Rhodes, who walked with a limp since severe wounding in World War I, won the 1945 Ashton-under-Lyne by-election.
- William Rees-Davies, who lost his right arm in action in World War II, won the 1953 Isle of Thanet by-election.

=== By-elections losers awarded seats on disqualification of winner ===
- Malcolm St Clair, 1961 Bristol South East by-election (resigned in 1963 to enable another by-election)
- Charles Beattie, 1955 Mid Ulster by-election (he too was disqualified a few weeks later, causing another by-election)
- Pre-1945: Stephen Moore, March 1875 County Tipperary by-election (retired in 1880)

=== Two or more former MPs contest by-election ===
- 2024 Rochdale by-election
- 2021 Hartlepool by-election^{1} (three former MPs)
- 2008 Haltemprice and Howden by-election^{2}
- 1997 Winchester by-election
- 1986 Fermanagh and South Tyrone by-election
- 1982 Beaconsfield by-election
- 1981 Warrington by-election
- 1969 Brighton Pavilion by-election
- 1965 Salisbury by-election
- 1956 Mid Ulster by-election
- 1948 Croydon North by-election
- 1933 Altrincham by-election (three former MPs)
- 1930 Glasgow Shettleston by-election
- 1930 Nottingham Central by-election (three former MPs)
- 1928 Cheltenham by-election

^{1} Hilton Dawson, Thelma Walker, and Paul Williams
^{2} Conservative MPs David Davis and Walter Sweeney

=== Winner of previous election runs again ===
The usual causes of by-elections – death or resignation – mean that incumbent MPs are rarely candidates. Typically, this only occurs if an MP deliberately triggers a by-election to get a mandate for a party change, or to bring a particular issue to public attention. More rarely, it can occur if an election result is challenged in court or, since the Recall of MPs Act 2015, an MP chooses to run after a recall petition against them succeeds. Historically, such cases were more common due to ministerial by-elections (see #Re-election of ministers).

Examples since 1945 include:

- 2026 Clacton by-election – Nigel Farage resigned and re-contested the election amid parliamentary scrutiny of Farage's personal finances and allegations concerning undeclared gifts and support. Farage won.
- 2019 Brecon and Radnorshire by-election – Chris Davies ran again after a recall petition against him succeeded. Davies lost.
- 2016 Richmond Park by-election – Zac Goldsmith resigned and ran as an independent in protest of plans to expand Heathrow Airport. Goldsmith lost.
- 2014 Rochester and Strood by-election – Mark Reckless defected from the Conservatives to UKIP. Reckless won.
- 2014 Clacton by-election – Douglas Carswell defected from the Conservatives to UKIP. Carswell won.
- 2008 Haltemprice and Howden by-election – David Davis resigned to force a by-election in protest of government policy on civil liberties. Davis won.
- 1997 Winchester by-election – Mark Oaten ran again after his previous win at the 1997 general election was declared void. Oaten won.
- 1986 Northern Ireland by-elections – All unionist MPs in Northern Ireland resigned and ran again in protest of the Anglo-Irish Agreement. One, Jim Nicholson, lost.
- 1982 Mitcham and Morden by-election – Bruce Douglas-Mann defected from Labour to the SDP. Douglas-Mann lost.
- 1973 Lincoln by-election – Dick Taverne left Labour and founded Democratic Labour. Taverne won.
- 1961 Bristol South East by-election – Tony Benn was disqualified as an MP after inheriting a peerage, which made him ineligible to sit in Commons. Benn ran again in the following by-election and won, but was disqualified. He would go on to win the 1963 Bristol South East by-election.
- 1955 Mid Ulster by-election and 1956 Mid Ulster by-election. Tom Mitchell ran in both of these despite being disqualified from the House of Commons. He won in 1955, but was disqualified, and lost in 1956.

== Frequency and duration records ==
=== Longest period without a by-election ===
The years 1998 and 2020 stand as the two in modern British history without any Westminster election. 1992, 1998, 2010 and 2020 are the four full calendar years in history without a single by-election.

From	To	Period (days)
1 August 2019	6 May 2021	645
20 November 1997	10 June 1999	567
7 November 1991	6 May 1993	546
12 March 1987	14 July 1988	489
14 February 2002	18 June 2003	483
23 February 2017	3 May 2018	434
12 November 2009	13 January 2011	427
23 May 1974	26 June 1975	399
18 June 2003	15 July 2004	393
29 June 2006	19 July 2007	385

=== Longest period between a vacancy arising and a by-election writ being moved ===
- 1941 The Wrekin by-election: 357 days. James Baldwin-Webb was presumed killed as a result of enemy action when SS City of Benares was torpedoed on 17 September 1940; the writ was moved on 9 September 1941.
- 1941 King's Norton by-election: 327 days. Ronald Cartland was killed in action on 29–30 May 1940. Initially posted missing, his death was not presumed until January 1941. The writ was moved on 22 April 1941.
- 1941 Hitchin by-election: 272 days. Sir Arnold Wilson was presumed killed in action on 31 May 1940; the writ was moved on 27 February 1941.
- 1969 Newcastle-under-Lyme by-election: 236 days. Stephen Swingler died on 19 February 1969; the writ was moved on 13 October 1969.
- 1969 Swindon by-election: 220 days. Francis Noel-Baker resigned on 7 March 1969; the writ was moved on 13 October 1969.

=== Longest period without a seat changing hands ===
The longest period without a seat changing hands in a by-election was the five years between the Conservative victories in the 1948 Glasgow Camlachie by-election and the 1953 Sunderland South by-election.

During the short Parliaments of 1910, 1950-1 and 1974 no seats changed hands in a by-election.

=== Longest period between by-election gains for a party ===
The Liberal Party endured 29 years without a single by-election gain between the 1929 Holland with Boston by-election and the 1958 Torrington by-election. It did not win a single by-election in the thirteen years between holding the 1945 Middlesbrough West by-election and gaining Torrington.

Until the 2008 Crewe and Nantwich by-election, the opposition Conservative Party had not gained a seat in almost 26 years, the last being the 1982 Mitcham and Morden by-election, which occurred during the unique circumstances of the Falklands War and the sitting Labour MP defecting to the Social Democratic Party and seeking re-election under his new party label. The Conservatives' last gain while in Opposition was 30 years previously at the 1978 Ilford North by-election.

Labour's longest lean stretch was almost 18 years, between gaining the 1939 Brecon and Radnorshire by-election and the 1957 Lewisham North by-election.^{1}

As of 12 November 2026, the most recent gains for each currently active party were:

Party	Date	Time since	By-election	Result	
Conservative	18 June 2026	4 months and 25 days	Aberdeen South	Gain from	SNP
Green	26 February 2026	8 months and 17 days	Gorton and Denton	Gain from	Labour
Reform	1 May 2025	1 year, 6 months and 11 days	Runcorn and Helsby	Gain from	Labour
Labour	2 May 2024	2 years, 6 months and 10 days	Blackpool South	Gain from	Conservative
Workers Party	29 February 2024	2 years, 8 months and 14 days	Rochdale	Gain from	Labour
Liberal Democrats	20 July 2023	3 years, 3 months and 23 days	Somerton and Frome	Gain from	Conservative
UKIP	20 November 2014	11 years, 11 months and 23 days	Rochester and Strood^{2}	Gain from	Conservative
SNP	24 July 2008	18 years, 3 months and 19 days	Glasgow East	Gain from	Labour
DUP	27 April 2000	26 years, 6 months and 16 days	South Antrim	Gain from	UUP
SDLP	23 January 1986	40 years, 9 months and 20 days	Newry and Armagh	Gain from	UUP
Plaid Cymru	14 July 1966	60 years, 3 months and 29 days	Carmarthen	Gain from	Labour
UUP	6 June 1946	80 years, 5 months and 6 days	Down^{3}	Gain from	Ind. Unionist
Sinn Féin	20 June 1918	108 years, 4 months and 23 days	East Cavan^{4}	Gain from	Irish Parliamentary

Notes ^{1} The Labour Party were the official opposition in the Parliament elected in 1935, but after the major parties agreed an electoral truce on the outbreak of war in 1939, they did not contest any Conservative or Liberal seats for the remainder of the Parliament, a period of six years, and were members of the wartime coalition government between May 1940 and May 1945.
^{2} Notional gain: incumbent Conservative stood as UKIP. No UKIP candidate has ever defeated an incumbent of a different party
^{3} The UUP were also declared winners of the 1955 Mid Ulster by-election after the Sinn Féin candidate was disqualified, but the UUP candidate was also disqualified shortly after.
^{4} Sinn Féin have not gained a seat at a by-election since 1918. However, the Anti H-Block party, an Irish Republican group that merged into Sinn Féin, gained Fermanagh and South Tyrone in the April 1981 by-election (45 years, 7 months and 3 days ago).

=== Longest period between by-election holds for a party ===
The Conservatives did not successfully defend a single by-election in the eight years between their holds of the 1989 Richmond (Yorks) by-election and the 1997 Uxbridge by-election, losing a record 15 consecutive seats where they were the incumbents. By the time of the by-election in Uxbridge, the victor in Richmond, William Hague, had become leader of the Conservative Party.

Labour's worst run was 4 consecutive by-election losses, which has occurred three times since 1945:

- between holding the 1976 Newcastle-upon-Tyne Central by-election and the 1977 Grimsby by-election.
- between holding the 1967 Manchester Gorton by-election and the 1968 Sheffield Brightside by-election.
- between holding the 1967 Rhondda West by-election and the 1967 Manchester Gorton by-election.

=== Longest period between by-election losses for a party ===
Between the 1988 Glasgow Govan by-election and the 2003 Brent East by-election, Labour successfully defended every seat it held at by-elections, for a total of 30 holds (not counting Falkirk West and West Bromwich West, represented by a Labour MP turned independent and a Labour speaker respectively and both won by Labour). The span of 14 years, 10 months and 8 days is the longest period without a by-election defeat for either of the two main parties. The Conservatives did not lose a seat between the 2000 Romsey by-election and the 2012 Corby by-election, a span of 12 years, 6 months and 12 days. However, they only defended 3 seats in that time. In terms of total number, their longest run of by-election holds was 51, between the 1945 Chelmsford by-election and the 1957 Lewisham North by-election, a span of 11 years, 9 months and 21 days.

Since their formation, the Liberal Democrats have held every Lib Dem seat contested at a by-election, of which there have been 3. Including their predecessor parties, their most recent by-election loss was the 1982 Mitcham and Morden by-election, lost by the SDP 44 years, 5 months and 9 days ago. The SDP candidate had however defected from Labour – the last seat lost by either party that had been won at a previous election was the 1957 Carmarthen by-election, lost by the Liberals 69 years, 8 months and 15 days ago. Since 1982, the Liberal Democrats and predecessors together have defended 4; since 1957 they have defended 5 seats.

By-elections in seats held by minor and nationalist parties are rare, and so most have never lost a seat. The SNP lost their first seat at the 2023 Rutherglen and Hamilton West by-election. The DUP, Plaid Cymru, and Reform UK have defended but never lost a seat at a by-election, Sinn Féin have only lost seats by disqualification, and the UUP have never lost more than one seat in a row. No by-election has ever been called in an SDLP held seat.

=== Longest period without an opposition gain ===
For a period of 11 years, from the 1997 general election until the 2008 Crewe and Nantwich by-election, the principal opposition Conservative Party failed to register a by-election gain against the incumbent Labour Government. This is the longest period of such failure since records began, and more than twice the previous record of the five years it took the Labour opposition to gain the 1957 Lewisham North by-election. Labour did however lose three seats to the Liberal Democrats in that period, their first being the 2003 Brent East by-election.

The Labour Party, in its period in opposition starting in 2010, did not register a gain for over nine years, between the 2012 Corby by-election and the 2022 Wakefield by-election. In this period, the Conservative government lost three seats in by-elections where the former Conservative incumbent stood for a different party (2014 Clacton by-election and 2014 Rochester and Strood by-election, both lost to UKIP) or as an independent (2016 Richmond Park by-election, lost to the Liberal Democrats). Their first loss in a by-election without a sitting incumbent was to the Liberal Democrats at the 2019 Brecon and Radnorshire by-election.

Apart from the brief parliaments of 1910, 1950–1 and 1974, the parliaments of 1951–5 and 1997–2001 are the only occasions when the Government did not lose a by-election.

=== Most by-elections in one day ===
The largest number of by-elections held on a single day occurred on 23 January 1986 when 15 simultaneous contests were held in Northern Ireland. The elections had been engineered by the incumbent Unionist parties as a protest against the Anglo-Irish Agreement of 1985. They intended the results to be interpreted as a referendum on the treaty. The elections were boycotted by the main Nationalist parties except in four seats where they had a reasonable prospect of victory. In the event, the Social Democratic and Labour Party gained one seat, Newry and Armagh, from the Ulster Unionist Party.

Apart from the above example, it is common for UK mainland parties to schedule several by-elections on the same day. Motivations include attempting to divide opponents' resources and getting bad news (expected losses) out of the way. Since 1945, the largest number of simultaneous mainland by-elections has been six, held on 16 November 1960. On four occasions, five by-elections have been held on the same day, most recently on 9 June 1994. Groupings of two or three are very common.

Before November 2012, the last day on which three by-elections had been held was 23 November 2000. In November 2012 there were two such groupings of three (15 November and 29 November). The last time there were six by-elections in one calendar month was in June 1994.

=== Most by-election losses in one day ===
The largest number of by-elections lost on a single day is three, when the Labour party lost Acton, Dudley and Meriden on 28 March 1968, all to the Conservatives.

Occasions since 1945 when two seats have fallen are:

Date	By-election	Winning party	Losing party
15 February 2024	2024 Kingswood by-election	Labour	Conservative
15 February 2024	2024 Wellingborough by-election	Labour	Conservative
19 October 2023	2023 Tamworth by-election	Labour	Conservative
19 October 2023	2023 Mid Bedfordshire by-election	Labour	Conservative
20 July 2023	2023 Somerton and Frome by-election	Liberal Democrats	Conservative
20 July 2023	2023 Selby and Ainsty by-election	Labour	Conservative
23 June 2022	2022 Tiverton and Honiton by-election	Liberal Democrats	Conservative
23 June 2022	2022 Wakefield by-election	Labour	Conservative
7 November 1991	1991 Kincardine and Deeside by-election	Liberal Democrats	Conservative
7 November 1991	1991 Langbaurgh by-election	Labour	Conservative
4 November 1976	1976 Walsall North by-election	Conservative	Labour
4 November 1976	1976 Workington by-election	Conservative	Labour
8 November 1973	1973 Glasgow Govan by-election	SNP	Labour
8 November 1973	1973 Berwick-upon-Tweed by-election	Liberal	Conservative
26 July 1973	1973 Ripon by-election	Liberal	Conservative
26 July 1973	1973 Isle of Ely by-election	Liberal	Conservative
2 November 1967	1967 Hamilton by-election	SNP	Labour
2 November 1967	1967 Leicester South West by-election	Conservative	Labour
21 September 1967	1967 Walthamstow West by-election	Conservative	Labour
21 September 1967	1967 Cambridge by-election	Conservative	Labour
22 November 1962	1962 Glasgow Woodside by-election	Labour	Conservative
22 November 1962	1962 South Dorset by-election	Labour	Conservative

=== Seats with more than one by-election in a single Parliament ===
- Bootle: May and November 1990.
- Fermanagh and South Tyrone: April and August 1981.
- Bristol South East: 1961 and 1963.
- Mid Ulster: 1955 and 1956.
- Edinburgh East: 1945 and 1947.
- Middlesbrough West: 1940 and 1945.
- Combined Scottish Universities: 1936, 1938 and 1945.
- Berwick-upon-Tweed: 1941 and 1944.
- Clay Cross: 1936 and 1944.
- West Derbyshire: 1938 and 1944.
- Buckingham: 1937 and 1943.
- Manchester Gorton: 1937 and 1942.
- Dunbartonshire: 1936 and 1941.
- Greenock: 1936 and 1941.
- Doncaster: 1938 and 1941.
- Southampton: February and November 1940.
- Preston: 1936 and 1940.
- Wandsworth Central: 1937 and 1940.
- City of London: 1938 and 1940.
- Combined Scottish Universities: 1934 and 1935.
- Eastbourne: 1932 and 1935.
- Twickenham: 1932 and 1934.
- Portsmouth South: 1922 and 1923.
- North Down: 1921, February and July 1922.
- West Down: 1921 and 1922.
- South Londonderry: 1921 and 1922.
- Louth: 1920 and 1921.
- The Wrekin: February and November 1920.
- North Londonderry: 1919 and 1922.
- Prestwich: January and October 1918.
- Keighley: 1911, 1913, 1915 and 1918.
- Edinburgh and St Andrews Universities: 1916 and 1917.
- St George's Hanover Square: 1913, 1916 and 1918.
- City of London: February and June 1906.
- Oswestry: 1901 and 1904.
- Southport: 1898 and 1899.
- City of London: April and June 1891.
- Buckingham: 1889 and 1891.
- Ayr Burghs: 1888 and 1890.
- Northampton: 1881, 1882 and 1884.
- Preston: 1881 and February and November 1882.
- Bath: May, June and October 1873.
- South Shropshire: 1866 and 1867.
- East Gloucestershire: January and December 1854.
- Greenwich: 1851 and 1852.
- South Nottinghamshire: 1848 and 1852.
- Buckinghamshire: 1837 and 1839 and 1842 and 1845, within two successive parliaments.

==== Other seats with by-elections less than five years apart ====
- Batley and Spen: 2016 and 2021
- Hemsworth: 1991 and 1996.
- Upper Bann: 1986 and 1990.
- Belfast South: 1982 and 1986.
- Fermanagh and South Tyrone: August 1981 and 1986.
- Nuneaton: 1965 and 1967.
- Ormskirk: 1951 and 1953.
- Liverpool Wavertree: 1931 and 1935.
- Twickenham: 1929, 1932 and 1934.
- Westminster Abbey: 1921 and 1924.

=== By-election days ===
British Parliamentary elections are invariably held on a Thursday. The last by-election not held on a Thursday was the 1978 Hamilton by-election, held on Wednesday 31 May due to a World Cup opening match on the Thursday evening.

Due to an administrative oversight, the 1973 Manchester Exchange by-election was held on Wednesday 27 June 1973. Prior to that, the last by-elections not held on a Thursday were the 1965 Saffron Walden by-election held on Tuesday 23 March, and the 1965 Roxburgh, Selkirk and Peebles by-election held the following day.

Until the mid-1960s, it was common to hold by-elections on any day of the week (other than Sunday).

=== Countermanded poll ===
Very occasionally, a scheduled by-election may be overtaken by the calling of a general election and the dissolution of Parliament, in which case the poll is countermanded by the Returning Officer. There have been only three occasions since 1918: a by-election was scheduled to take place in Warwick and Leamington on 21 November 1923, but was cancelled by a dissolution of Parliament on 16 November. A by-election was scheduled to poll between 13 and 17 October 1924 in London University but was cancelled by a dissolution of Parliament on 9 October. In 2017 the Manchester Gorton by-election was cancelled by a Motion in the House of Commons following the calling of the 2017 United Kingdom general election.

=== Seats left vacant ===
Occasionally seats are left vacant for a substantial period.

No by-election writ was moved for any seat held by Sinn Féin after the 1918 general election. Four Sinn Féin candidates were elected in two different seats and would have had to decline one of them if they had wanted to take their seats. They were Éamon de Valera (East Clare and East Mayo), Arthur Griffith (East Cavan and North West Tyrone), Eoin MacNeill (Londonderry City and National University of Ireland) and Liam Mellowes (East Galway and North Meath).

By the end of the Parliament, the following Sinn Féin MPs had died without being replaced: Pierce McCan (East Tipperary) of influenza on 6 March 1919, Terence MacSwiney (Mid Cork) following a hunger strike in Brixton prison on 25 October 1920, Frank Lawless (North Dublin) as a result of a riding injury on 16 April 1922, Joseph McGuinness (Longford) on 31 May 1922, Cathal Brugha (Waterford) in action during the Irish Civil War on 7 July 1922, Harry Boland (South Roscommon) shot while being arrested on 2 August 1922, Arthur Griffith (East Cavan and North West Tyrone) on 12 August 1922, and Michael Collins (South Cork assassinated on 22 August 1922). In each case their seats were abolished in 1922 as a result of the establishment of the Irish Free State.

Other than these cases the longest time a seat has been left vacant with no by-election held is when Dennis Vosper was elevated to the Peerage on 20 April 1964, and no writ was moved by the time Parliament was dissolved on 25 September 1964.

== Causes of by-elections ==
=== By-elections prompted by assassination ===
Date of assassination	Member	Detail	By-election	By-election date	Defending party	Winning party
15 October 2021	Sir David Amess	Stabbed during a surgery by an Islamic extremist	2022 Southend West by-election	3 February 2022	Conservative	Conservative (Note: As a mark of respect for the murdered MP, none of the other major parties had a candidate to contest the by-election.)
16 June 2016	Jo Cox	Cox was killed by a white nationalist	2016 Batley and Spen by-election	20 October 2016	Labour	Labour
30 July 1990	Ian Gow	Killed by Provisional IRA bomb under his car	1990 Eastbourne by-election	18 October 1990	Conservative	Liberal Democrats
12 October 1984	Sir Anthony Berry	Killed by Provisional IRA bombing of Brighton	1984 Enfield Southgate by-election	13 December 1984	Conservative	Conservative
14 November 1981	Rev. Robert Bradford	Shot by Provisional IRA	1982 Belfast South by-election	4 March 1982	UUP	UUP
22 June 1922	Field Marshal Sir Henry Wilson, Bt.	Shot outside his home by IRA gunmen	July 1922 North Down by-election	21 July 1922	UUP	UUP

=== By-elections prompted by suicide ===
Member	By-election	By-election date	Defending Party	Winning Party
Gordon McMaster	1997 Paisley South by-election	6 November 1997	Labour	Labour
John Heddle	1990 Mid Staffordshire by-election	22 March 1990	Conservative	Labour
Jocelyn Cadbury	1982 Birmingham Northfield by-election	28 October 1982	Conservative	Labour
Bernard Floud	1968 Acton by-election	28 March 1968	Labour	Conservative
Sir Albert Braithwaite	1960 Harrow West by-election	17 March 1960	Conservative	Conservative
Thomas Stamford	1949 Leeds West by-election	21 July 1949	Labour	Labour
John Whittaker	1946 Heywood and Radcliffe by-election	21 February 1946	Labour	Labour
Sir Charles Cayzer	1940 City of Chester by-election	7 March 1940	Conservative	Conservative
Anthony Muirhead	1939 Wells by-election	13 December 1939	Conservative	Conservative
Edward Marjoribanks	1932 Eastbourne by-election	28 April 1932	Conservative	Conservative

Note

^{1}Death by hunger strike.

=== By-elections prompted by accidental death ===
Date of death	Member	Detail	By-election	By-election date	Defending party	Winning party
6 September 2014	Jim Dobbin	Died of alcohol poisoning	2014 Heywood and Middleton by-election	9 October 2014	Labour	Labour
24 February 2000	Michael Colvin	Killed by a house fire	2000 Romsey by-election	4 May 2000	Conservative	Liberal Democrats
7 February 1994	Stephen Milligan	Accidentally choked himself while attempting autoerotic asphyxia	1994 Eastleigh by-election	9 June 1994	Conservative	Liberal Democrats
12 April 1994	Bob Cryer	Killed in a car crash	1994 Bradford South by-election	9 June 1994	Labour	Labour
22 December 1986	David Penhaligon	Killed in a car crash	1987 Truro by-election	12 March 1987	Liberal	Liberal
30 April 1980	Thomas McMillan	Died from injuries received in falling from a bus	1980 Glasgow Central by-election	26 June 1980	Labour	Labour
31 October 1962	Jack Jones	Killed in a car crash	1963 Rotherham by-election	28 March 1963	Labour	Labour
9 December 1958	Sidney Dye	Killed in a car crash	1959 South West Norfolk by-election	25 March 1959	Labour	Labour
3 February 1958	Wilfred Fienburgh	Killed in a car crash	1958 Islington North by-election	15 May 1958	Labour	Labour
3 August 1957	Richard Stokes	Died from injuries received in a car crash	1957 Ipswich by-election	24 October 1957	Labour	Labour
31 January 1953	Sir Walter Smiles	Killed in the MV Princess Victoria disaster during the storm surge	1953 North Down by-election	15 April 1953	UUP	UUP
31 May 1952	Thomas Cook	Killed in a car crash	1952 Dundee East by-election	17 July 1952	Labour	Labour
3 September 1948	Evan Durbin	Drowned while swimming	1948 Edmonton by-election	13 November 1948	Labour	Labour
7 October 1947	Joseph Westwood	Killed in a car crash	1948 Stirling and Falkirk by-election	7 October 1948	Labour	Labour
20 December 1947	Sir William Allen	Died from injuries received in a road accident	1948 Armagh by-election	5 March 1948	UUP	UUP
3 June 1947	Dr Richard Clitherow	Died due to an overdose of barbiturates after he had been "run down and jaded".	1947 Liverpool Edge Hill by-election	11 September 1947	Labour	Labour
6 February 1947	Ellen Wilkinson	Killed by an accidental overdose of medication	1947 Jarrow by-election	7 May 1947	Labour	Labour
28 December 1945	Francis Beattie	Killed in a car crash	1946 Glasgow Cathcart by-election	12 February 1946	Unionist	Unionist
27 July 1945	Alfred Dobbs	Killed in a car crash	1945 Smethwick by-election	1 October 1945	Labour	Labour
5 January 1945	James Walker	Killed in a road accident	1945 Motherwell by-election	12 April 1945	Labour	SNP
16 January 1944	Lieut-Col. Frank Heilgers	Killed in the 1944 Ilford rail crash	1944 Bury St Edmunds by-election	29 February 1944	Conservative	Conservative
9 July 1942	John Jagger	Killed in a motorcycle accident	1942 Manchester Clayton by-election	17 October 1942	Labour	Labour
15 August 1939	Anthony Crossley	Killed in a plane crash	1939 Stretford by-election	8 December 1939	Conservative	Conservative
1 May 1933	Viscount Knebworth	Killed in a plane crash	1933 Hitchin by-election	8 June 1933	Conservative	Conservative

=== By-elections prompted by posthumous election of MP ===
- 1945 Bromley by-election: Sir Edward Taswell Campbell died before his election declaration at the 1945 general election.
- 1945 Monmouth by-election: Leslie Pym died before his election declaration at the 1945 general election.
- 1936 Combined Scottish Universities by-election: Noel Skelton died before his election declaration at the 1935 general election.
- 1906 North Galway by-election: Thomas Higgins died before his election declaration at the 1906 general election.

=== By-elections prompted by a successful recall petition ===
- 2024 Wellingborough by-election: Peter Bone was removed from office by recall petition following accusations of bullying and sexual misconduct.
- 2023 Rutherglen and Hamilton West by-election: the seat was declared vacant after Margaret Ferrier lost a recall petition. Ferrier was convicted at Glasgow Sheriff Court of breaching COVID-19 travel rules in 2020, and suspended from the House of Commons.
- 2019 Brecon and Radnorshire by-election: the seat was declared vacant after Chris Davies pleaded guilty to filing false expenses claims, and a recall petition was successful.
- 2019 Peterborough by-election: the seat was declared vacant after Fiona Onasanya was convicted of perverting the course of justice in relation to motoring penalty points issued in 2017. This was the first successful recall petition under the provisions of the Recall of MPs Act 2015.

=== By-elections prompted by scandal ===
- 2025 Runcorn and Helsby by-election: Mike Amesbury pleaded guilty to assaulting a constituent, the incident being recorded by CCTV camera. He was sentenced to 10 weeks imprisonment, the sentence later suspended on appeal. Amesbury spent three nights in jail. Amesbury's subsequent resignation as an MP prompted a by-election.
- 2024 Blackpool South by-election: Scott Benton – In April 2023 Benton had the whip removed after he had offered to reporters, posing as investors, that he would lobby ministers in return for payments. A parliamentary investigation concluded that he had breached lobbying rules and recommended a 35-day suspension from the House of Commons, triggering a recall petition. Benton's subsequent resignation as an MP prompted a by-election.
- 2023 Tamworth by-election: Chris Pincher resigned, after losing an appeal against suspension from the House of Commons, in the wake of allegations that he had drunkenly groped two men. The Committee for Standards concluded Pincher's "profoundly damaging" behaviour "represented an abuse of power", causing significant damage to Parliament's reputation. The scandal was also instrumental in the fall of Prime Minister Boris Johnson.
- 2023 Somerton and Frome by-election: David Warburton resigned in advance of results of investigation into alleged sexual harassment, and his admission to taking cocaine.
- 2023 Uxbridge and South Ruislip by-election: Former Prime Minister Boris Johnson resigned 'with immediate effect', in advance of findings of his repeated contempts, and that he deliberately misled Parliament over Partygate, warranting a 90-day suspension.
- 2022 City of Chester by-election: Chris Matheson resigned after being suspended for serious sexual misconduct.
- 2022 Tiverton and Honiton by-election: Neil Parish resigned after admitting watching pornography in the House of Commons.
- 2022 Wakefield by-election: Imran Ahmad Khan resigned after his conviction of sexual assault on a 15-year-old boy.
- 2021 North Shropshire by-election: Owen Paterson resigned amid controversy surrounding a report by the Parliamentary Commissioner for Standards which found that he had broken paid advocacy rules.
- 2021 Hartlepool by-election: Mike Hill resigned in advance of an employment tribunal verdict that he had assaulted, harassed and victimised a parliamentary worker.
- 2018 West Tyrone by-election: Barry McElduff resigned after becoming embroiled in a social media controversy.
- 2014 Newark by-election: Patrick Mercer resigned after being suspended from the House of Commons for six months by the Parliamentary Standards Committee for asking parliamentary questions in exchange for money.
- 2013 Eastleigh by-election: Chris Huhne resigned after pleading guilty to perverting the course of justice in relation to persuading his wife to accept motoring penalty points in 2003.
- 2012 Rotherham by-election: Denis MacShane resigned after House of Commons Standards and Privileges Committee recommended he be suspended from the service of the House for twelve months; their inquiry arose from the United Kingdom Parliamentary expenses scandal.
- 2011 Barnsley Central by-election: Eric Illsley resigned after pleading guilty to charges of false accounting arising from the United Kingdom Parliamentary expenses scandal.
- 2009 Glasgow North East by-election: Michael Martin resigned as Speaker rather than face a vote of no confidence, amid criticism of his actions arising from the United Kingdom Parliamentary expenses scandal.
- 2009 Norwich North by-election: Ian Gibson resigned after being debarred as a Labour candidate, due to allegations arising from the United Kingdom Parliamentary expenses scandal.
- 1997 Beckenham by-election: Piers Merchant resigned after a newspaper story revealed that his previous denials of an affair were lies.
- 1977 Bournemouth East by-election: John Cordle resigned after he was criticised by a Select Committee for business links to corrupt architect John Poulson.
- 1976 Walsall North by-election: John Stonehouse resigned after being convicted of insurance fraud.
- 1973 Berwick-upon-Tweed by-election: Antony Lambton resigned after his visits to prostitutes and use of cannabis were exposed by the News of the World.
- 1963 Stratford-upon-Avon by-election: John Profumo resigned after his denials of an affair with Christine Keeler were shown to be lies.
- 1959 Harrow East by-election: Ian Harvey resigned after conviction for gross indecency with a guardsman in Hyde Park.
- 1953 Paddington North by-election: Bill Field resigned after conviction for importuning for immoral purposes in a public lavatory.
- 1949 Sowerby by-election: John Belcher resigned after being found to have accepted gifts from businessmen for political favours.
- 1941 Scarborough and Whitby by-election: Sir Paul Latham resigned after he was arrested to be tried by court-martial on 13 charges of disgraceful conduct.
- 1936 Derby by-election: James Henry Thomas resigned after being found to have disclosed budget secrets.
- 1936 Balham and Tooting by-election: Sir Alfred Butt resigned after being found to have disclosed budget secrets.
- 1931 Pontypridd by-election: Thomas Mardy Jones resigned after being found to have abused a travel voucher.
- 1926 Buckrose by-election: Guy Gaunt resigned after being cited as co-respondent in a divorce case.

=== By-elections prompted to provide seat for seat-less personality ===
- 2026 Makerfield by-election: For Andy Burnham.
- 1965 Leyton by-election: For Patrick Gordon Walker (defeated).
- 1965 Nuneaton by-election: For Frank Cousins.
- 1950 Sheffield Neepsend by-election: For Frank Soskice.
- February 1940 Southampton by-election: For Sir John Reith.
- 1940 Wandsworth Central by-election: For Ernest Bevin.
- 1922 Portsmouth South by-election: For Leslie Orme Wilson.
- February 1906 City of London by-election: For Arthur Balfour.
- 1896 Montrose Burghs by-election: For John Morley.

=== By-elections prompted by party disputes and defections ===
By-elections are ostensibly to vote for a 'person', not a 'party', meaning that a member switching parties mid-term is not cause for a by-election. However, some members do seek re-election under their new party as a point of principle.

Member of Parliament	By-election	Former party	New party	Details
Stephen Phillips	2016 Sleaford and North Hykeham by-election	Conservative	Did not contest	Resigned, citing irreconcilable differences with his party owing to a "lurch to the right", he could no longer accept the appellation "Conservative" or continue to represent his constituents.
Mark Reckless	2014 Rochester and Strood by-election	Conservative	UKIP	Joined the UK Independence Party over policy on European Union membership referendum.
Douglas Carswell	2014 Clacton by-election	Conservative	UKIP	Joined the UK Independence Party over policy on European Union membership referendum.
Robert Mellish	1983 Bermondsey by-election	Labour	Did not contest	Disenchanted with left-wing takeover of his Constituency Labour Party (CLP), obtained a job with the London Docklands Development Corporation, left the Labour Party and resigned to force a by-election.
Bruce Douglas-Mann	1982 Mitcham and Morden by-election	Labour	SDP	Sought re-election having defected to newly formed SDP; defeated by Conservative candidate.
Dick Taverne	1973 Lincoln by-election	Labour	Democratic Labour	Sought re-election as an Independent 'Democratic Labour' candidate after being deselected by his CLP; he was successful.
Ray Gunter	1972 Southwark by-election	Labour	Did not contest	Resigned from the Labour Party in disagreement with its stance opposing European Economic Community entry.
Victor Raikes	1957 Liverpool Garston by-election	Conservative	Did not contest	Resigned the Conservative whip over the Suez crisis, and then resigned from Parliament on obtaining a business appointment in Southern Rhodesia.
Stanley Evans	1957 Wednesbury by-election	Labour	Did not contest	Supported the Conservative government's Suez policy, resigned after being asked to by his Constituency Labour Party.
Anthony Nutting	1956 Melton by-election	Conservative	Did not contest	Minister of State for Foreign Affairs, resigned in protest at Suez invasion policy.
William Allen Jowitt	1929 Preston by-election	Liberal	Labour	Sought re-election as Labour Party candidate having been offered role of Attorney General by Ramsay MacDonald.
Joseph Kenworthy	1926 Kingston upon Hull Central by-election	Liberal	Labour	Sought re-election as Labour Party candidate following disillusion with leadership of Lloyd George.
J. E. B. Seely	1904 Isle of Wight by-election	Conservative	Independent	Resigned seat in opposition to Conservative policy. Returned unopposed as an independent Conservative and subsequently re-elected in 1906 as a Liberal MP.
Cathcart Wason	1902 Orkney and Shetland by-election	Liberal	Independent	Resigned and successfully re-contested his seat

=== By-elections resulting from members resigning on principle ===
- 2026 Clacton by-election: Nigel Farage resigned to re-contest, describing the poll as a "People versus the Establishment by-election", amid allegations surrounding his finances and alleged press intrusion on his family. The three major parties immediately declined to contest the by-election.
- 2024 Kingswood by-election: Chris Skidmore resigned in opposition to a bill that allows the issuance of new oil and gas licences.
- 2016 Richmond Park by-election: Zac Goldsmith resigned to force a by-election on the issue of the expansion of Heathrow Airport, and contested as an independent. He was defeated by Sarah Olney of the Liberal Democrats. Goldsmith later regained his seat the following year at the 2017 general election.
- 2008 Haltemprice and Howden by-election: David Davis resigned to force a by-election on the issue of civil liberties. He was re-elected with neither of the other main parties contesting the seat.
- 1986 Northern Ireland by-elections: Fifteen Unionist MPs resigned and re-contested their seats in protest at the Anglo-Irish Agreement. All but one was re-elected.
- 1963 Bristol South East by-election: Malcolm St Clair honoured a pledge to stand down if law changed to allow Tony Benn to disclaim his peerage.
- 1938 Kinross-shire and Perthshire by-election: The Duchess of Atholl resigned in protest at Neville Chamberlain's appeasement policy and sought re-election. She was defeated.
- 1927 Southwark North by-election: Leslie Haden-Guest resigned from the Labour Party over its policy on China, and re-contested the seat as an independent Constitutionalist with Conservative support. He was defeated, finishing bottom of the poll. The Liberals gained the seat.
- 1927 Leith by-election: William Wedgwood Benn resigned following his resignation from the Liberal party and joining the Labour Party. He did not contest the by-election out of fairness to the existing Labour candidate. The seat was narrowly held by a new Liberal candidate.
- 1914 Cork City by-election: William O'Brien resigned to submit himself to the voters after the Irish Nationalists had made council gains in Cork. He was returned unopposed.
- 1912 Bow and Bromley by-election: George Lansbury resigned to contest his seat on the issue of Women's Suffrage, although he was disenchanted with a range of Labour party policies. He was defeated.
- 1909 Stratford-on-Avon by-election: Thomas Kincaid-Smith resigned from the Liberal Party on the issue of compulsory national service. He stood as an independent with National Service League support. He was defeated, finishing bottom of the poll.
- 1906 Mid Cork by-election: D. D. Sheehan resigned and re-contested his seat following his expulsion from the Irish Nationalist group for not signing the party pledge. Re-elected as an independent.

=== By-elections prompted by member's desire to contest another seat ===
- 1918 East Tyrone by-election: William Redmond resigned to defend his late father's seat at Waterford City. He was successful.
- 1914 East Worcestershire by-election: Austen Chamberlain resigned to defend his late father's seat at Birmingham West. He was successful.
- 1911 East Wicklow by-election: John Muldoon resigned to contest the East Cork by-election. He was successful, effectively swapping seats with Anthony Donelan.

=== By-elections caused by the previous result being declared void ===
- 2011 Oldham East and Saddleworth by-election: The result of the 2010 general election was declared void because the victor was found guilty of knowingly making false statements about a rival candidate.
- 1997 Winchester by-election: The result of the 1997 general election was declared void because ballot papers which had not received the official mark would have affected the result, if counted. Liberal Democrat Mark Oaten massively increased the minute majority he had achieved in the general election.
- 1924 Oxford by-election: The result of the 1923 general election was declared void because there were irregularities in the election expenses of the successful candidate.
- 1923 Berwick-upon-Tweed by-election: The result of the 1922 general election was declared void because there were irregularities in the election expenses of the successful candidate.
- 1911 North Louth by-election: The result of the December 1910 general election was declared void because of corrupt practices and bribery by the successful candidate.

=== By-elections prompted by disqualification of the sitting member ===
- 1961 Bristol South East by-election: Tony Benn had inherited a Peerage from his father. Although by-elections were routinely called where Members had succeeded to the Peerage, the seat was not considered vacated until the Member had received a Writ of Summons to the House of Lords, and Benn, who refused to accept the Peerage, did not apply for one. The seat was declared vacant by a resolution of the House of Commons.
- 1956 Mid Ulster by-election: Charles Beattie was found to be disqualified through membership of National Assistance panels. A bill indemnifying him from the consequences of acting as an MP while disqualified was passed by the House of Commons; Beattie did not stand in the by-election.
- 1955 Mid Ulster by-election: Tom Mitchell was disqualified as a felon (resolution of the House).
- 1950 Belfast West by-election: Rev James Godfrey MacManaway was found by the Judicial Committee of the Privy Council to be disqualified, as a minister of the Church of Ireland.
- 1925 Walsall by-election: William Preston was found to be disqualified owing to his holding government contracts. A bill indemnifying him was passed by the House of Commons and Preston was re-elected at the by-election.
- 1924 Dover by-election: John Astor was disqualified for voting before he took the oath. He was returned unopposed at the by-election.
- 1913 Whitechapel by-election: Sir Stuart Samuel was found to be disqualified owing to his holding government contracts. A bill indemnifying him was passed by the House of Commons and Samuel was narrowly re-elected at the by-election.
- 1904 City of London by-election: Alban Gibbs was found to be disqualified owing to his holding government contracts. Gibbs resigned and was re-elected unopposed at the by-election.
- 1904 St Albans by-election: Vicary Gibbs was found to be disqualified owing to his holding government contracts. Gibbs resigned and was narrowly defeated at the by-election.

=== By-elections prompted by expulsion from the House ===
- 1955 South Norfolk by-election: Peter Baker was expelled after being convicted of uttering forged documents.
- 1947 Gravesend by-election: Garry Allighan was expelled after being found to be in extreme contempt of the House by his peers after selling details of private parliamentary meetings to the Evening Standard.
- 1922 Hackney South by-election: Horatio Bottomley was expelled after being convicted of fraud, perjury and false accounting.
- 1903 Galway Borough by-election: the seat was declared vacant after Arthur Alfred Lynch was convicted of high treason after fighting on the Boer side in the Second Boer War.

=== By-elections prompted by lunacy ===
- 1916 Colne Valley by-election: Charles Leach was adjudged a lunatic and his seat declared vacant.

=== By-elections prompted by bankruptcy ===
- 1928 Ashton-under-Lyne by-election: Cornelius Homan lost his seat after being declared bankrupt.
- 1922 Camberwell North by-election: Henry Newton Knights lost his seat after being declared bankrupt.
- 1914 North Galway by-election: Richard Hazleton resigned before being declared bankrupt. He discharged his bankruptcy and was returned in the by-election.
- 1912 Hackney South by-election: Horatio Bottomley resigned after filing a bankruptcy petition.
- 1909 South Kilkenny by-election: Nicholas Joseph Murphy was declared bankrupt.

=== By-elections prompted for miscellaneous reasons ===
- 1916 Widnes by-election: William Hall Walker resigned to permit him to donate his thoroughbred racing stock to create a National Stud in an "arms-length" transaction. He was returned unopposed at the by-election.

=== By-elections prompted by death of member on wartime active service ===
==== Second World War ====
- 1945 Chelmsford by-election: John Macnamara was killed in action fighting in Italy.
- 1944 Berwick-upon-Tweed by-election: George Charles Grey was killed in action fighting in Normandy, France.
- 1944 Bury St Edmunds by-election: Frank Heilgers was killed in a train crash in Ilford.
- 1943 Acton by-election: Hubert Duggan died of tuberculosis contracted on active service.^{a}
- 1943 Darwen by-election: Stuart Russell died of fever on active service in Egypt.
- 1943 Chippenham by-election: Victor Cazalet was killed in a plane crash in Gibraltar while escorting General Sikorski.
- 1943 Birmingham Aston by-election: Edward Orlando Kellett was killed in action fighting in North Africa.
- 1943 Buckingham by-election: John Whiteley was killed in a plane crash in Gibraltar while escorting General Sikorski.
- 1943 Bristol Central by-election: Lord Apsley was killed in action in a plane crash in the Middle-East.
- 1943 King's Lynn by-election: Somerset Maxwell died of wounds received at the Battle of El Alamein.
- 1942 Salisbury by-election: James Despencer-Robertson died suddenly, apparently from overwork as military secretary at Southern Command Headquarters.^{b}
- 1942 Llandaff and Barry by-election: Patrick Munro died while taking part in an exercise for the Home Guard at Westminster.
- 1941 The Wrekin by-election: James Baldwin-Webb drowned when the SS City of Benares was torpedoed.
- 1941 Dudley by-election: Dudley Joel was killed in action while serving with the Royal Navy.
- 1941 Bodmin by-election: John Rathbone was killed in action on bombing operations over Germany.
- 1941 Hitchin by-election: Sir Arnold Wilson was killed in action over northern France while a gunner in Bomber Command
- 1941 King's Norton by-election: Ronald Cartland was killed in action during the retreat to Dunkirk.
- 1940 Manchester Exchange by-election: Peter Eckersley was killed in action in a plane crash while serving with the Fleet Air Arm.
- 1940 Heywood and Radcliffe by-election: Richard Porritt was killed in action fighting in Belgium.
- 1939 Wells by-election: Anthony Muirhead committed suicide owing to his fear that a leg-injury might prevent his service in the War.^{b}

Notes: The above list is of those members either mentioned as having died on War Service in a written Commons answer from Prime Minister Winston Churchill on 19 January 1945, or who appear in the House of Commons Book of Remembrance unveiled in 1949.

^{a} Mentioned in the written Commons answer, but does not appear in the House of Commons Book of Remembrance.
^{b} Not mentioned in the written Commons answer, but does appear in the House of Commons Book of Remembrance.

NB: The above list does not include the names of three members whose deaths on active service were overtaken by the 1945 general election. For a complete list see Records of members of parliament of the United Kingdom#Second World War

==== First World War ====
- October 1918 Prestwich by-election: Oswald Cawley had been killed in action in France.
- 1918 Bath by-election: Lord Alexander Thynne had been killed in action in France.
- 1918 Canterbury by-election: Francis Bennett-Goldney had been killed by an on-duty car accident in France.
- 1918 Ross by-election: Percy Clive had been killed in action in France.
- 1918 Manchester South by-election: Philip Glazebrook had been killed in action in Palestine.
- 1917 Wisbech by-election: The Hon Neil Primrose died of wounds received in Palestine.
- 1917 Spalding by-election: The Hon Francis McLaren had been killed in a flying accident serving with the Royal Flying Corps.
- 1917 East Clare by-election: Willie Redmond had been killed in action in Belgium.
- 1917 Henley by-election: Valentine Fleming had been killed by shell fire in France.
- 1916 North Ayrshire by-election: Duncan Frederick Campbell had died in England of wounds received from a landmine on the Western Front.
- 1916 Winchester by-election: The Hon Guy Baring had been killed in the Battle of the Somme in France.
- 1916 Tewkesbury by-election: Michael Hicks Beach, Viscount Quenington had died of wounds in Egypt.
- 1915 St Austell by-election: The Hon Thomas Agar-Robartes had died of wounds received in the Battle of Loos in France.
- 1915 Cardiff by-election: Lord Ninian Crichton-Stuart had been killed in action in France.
- 1915 Uxbridge by-election: The Hon Charles Thomas Mills had been killed in action in France.
- 1915 Heywood by-election: Harold Thomas Cawley had been killed in action in the Battle of Gallipoli.
- 1915 Kilmarnock Burghs by-election: William Glynne Charles Gladstone had been killed in action in France.
- 1915 Mid Antrim by-election: The Hon Arthur O'Neill had been killed in action in the Ypres Salient in Belgium.

== Miscellaneous records ==
=== Incumbents fall directly from first place to fourth place ===
- 2024 Rochdale by-election:^{1} Labour candidate, loss to Workers Party of Britain candidate.

=== Incumbents fall directly from first place to third place ===
- 2026 Gorton and Denton by-election Labour loss, gained by the Green Party
- 1995 Littleborough and Saddleworth by-election Conservative loss, gained by the Liberal Democrats
- 1995 Perth and Kinross by-election Conservative loss, gained by the SNP
- 1994 Eastleigh by-election Conservative loss, gained by the Liberal Democrats
- 1985 Brecon and Radnor by-election Conservative loss, gained by the Liberals
- 1982 Mitcham and Morden by-election^{2} Labour loss, gained by the Conservatives
- 1958 Rochdale by-election Conservative loss, gained by Labour
- 1934 Merthyr by-election ILP loss, gained by Labour
- 1929 Holland with Boston by-election Conservative loss, gained by the Liberals
- 1927 Bosworth by-election Conservative loss, gained by the Liberals
- 1926 Kingston upon Hull Central by-election^{3} Liberal loss, gained by Labour
- 1920 South Norfolk by-election Liberal loss, gained by Labour

^{1} Labour candidate Azhar Ali was suspended at the time of the election, due to allegedly anti-Semitic comments.

^{2} Bruce Douglas-Mann had been re-elected as Labour MP for the seat in the 1979 general election. In 1981, along with several other MPs, he defected to the newly formed Social Democratic Party. Against his new colleagues' advice, he honoured a pledge to face his electors under his new party colours and precipitated a by-election. He came second in the by-election which was won by the Conservatives. The new Labour candidate finished third.

^{3} the Liberal MP, Lt-Commander the Hon. Joseph Montague Kenworthy, defected to Labour and sought re-election under his new colours. He was successful, and the new Liberal candidate lost his deposit.

=== Incumbent government gains seats ===
These records show the rare occasions when the government won a seat they had not won at the previous general election.

Party	By-election	Losing party
Conservative	2021 Hartlepool by-election	Labour
Conservative	2017 Copeland by-election	Labour
Conservative	1982 Mitcham and Morden by-election	Labour
Conservative	1961 Bristol South-East by-election^{1}	Labour
Conservative	1960 Brighouse and Spenborough by-election	Labour
Conservative	1953 Sunderland South by-election	Labour
Conservative	1926 Combined English Universities by-election	Liberal
Conservative	1923 Berwick-upon-Tweed by-election^{3}	National Liberal
Conservative	1922 Hackney South by-election^{b}	Independent
Conservative	1921 Woolwich East by-election^{b}	Labour
Conservative	1920 Stockport by-election^{2b}	Coalition Labour
Labour^{a}	1929 Liverpool Scotland by-election^{4}	Irish Nationalist
Labour^{a}	1929 Preston by-election^{5}	Liberal
Labour^{a}	1924 Liverpool West Toxteth by-election	Conservative
Liberal	1913 Chesterfield by-election	Labour
Liberal	1913 Londonderry City by-election	Irish Unionist
Liberal	1912 Hanley by-election	Labour
Liberal	1912 Hackney South by-election	Independent

==== Notes ====
^{1} Seat awarded by Election Court to Conservative runner-up because Labour victor deemed ineligible.
^{2} An arguable gain; Stockport was a two-member seat; in the 1918 general election it was won by two supporters of the Coalition Government, one a Liberal and one a Labour member. After a death and a resignation, a by-election was held for both seats. The seats were again won by two Coalition Government supporters, but this time a Conservative and a Liberal, while a Labour candidate who did not support the government was unsuccessful.
^{3} National Liberal elected in 1922 election had his election declared void (electoral fraud). Resulting by-election was a gain for the Conservatives.
^{4} Uncontested gain from Irish Nationalist.
^{5} Liberal MP defected to Labour and was re-elected as Labour at a by-election the Liberals did not contest.
^{a}Labour won both the 2000 West Bromwich West by-election and 2009 Glasgow North East by-election, regarded as a gain from the contest at the United Kingdom general elections in 1997 and 2005 respectively as those seats had been contested by the Speakers of the House of Commons. Prior to assuming the Speakership they had both been elected as Labour MPs.
^{b}The Conservatives were in Coalition government, led by the Liberal Prime Minister, David Lloyd George.

=== Principal Opposition loses seats ===
These records show the rare occasions when the official Opposition failed to hold on to a seat they had won at the previous general election.

Lost by	Gained by	By-election
Conservative	Liberal Democrats	2000 Romsey by-election
Conservative	Unity	1969 Mid Ulster by-election (from Ulster Unionist)
Conservative	Liberal	1965 Roxburgh, Selkirk and Peebles by-election
Conservative	Empire Crusade	1930 Paddington South by-election^{1}
Conservative	Labour	1924 Liverpool West Toxteth by-election
Labour	Workers Party	2024 Rochdale by-election
Labour	Conservative	2021 Hartlepool by-election
Labour	Conservative	2017 Copeland by-election
Labour	Respect	2012 Bradford West by-election
Labour	SNP	1988 Glasgow Govan by-election
Labour	SDP	1987 Greenwich by-election
Labour	Liberal	1983 Bermondsey by-election
Labour	Conservative	1982 Mitcham and Morden by-election
Labour	SNP	1973 Glasgow Govan by-election
Labour	Democratic Labour	1973 Lincoln by-election
Labour	Liberal	1972 Rochdale by-election
Labour	Conservative	1961 Bristol South East by-election^{2}
Labour	Conservative	1960 Brighouse and Spenborough by-election
Labour	Conservative	1953 Sunderland South by-election
Labour	Liberal	1927 Southwark North by-election
Labour	Liberal	1923 Anglesey by-election^{3}
Labour	Unionist	1921 Woolwich East by-election^{4}

^{1}A confused situation, where the victorious Empire Free Trade Crusade candidate was effectively a right-wing unofficial Conservative, who subsequently took the whip and was re-elected as official Conservative candidate.
^{2}seat awarded by Election Court to Conservative runner-up because Labour victor Viscount Stansgate was deemed ineligible.
^{3}Sir Owen Thomas had been elected as Independent Labour, took the whip for a while, before reverting to Independent Labour.
^{4}Lost to Coalition Conservatives (see Coalition Coupon)

=== By-election holds overturned at next general election ===
On rare occasions a party has failed to overturn an incumbent in the by-election yet has gone on to gain the seat at the subsequent general election.

By-election	Held by	Gain by	General election
2023 Uxbridge and South Ruislip by-election	Conservative	Labour	2024
2022 Southend West by-election	Conservative	Labour^{1}	2024
2021 Airdrie and Shotts by-election	SNP	Labour	2024
2019 Peterborough by-election	Labour	Conservative	2019
2013 Eastleigh by-election	Liberal Democrats	Conservative	2015
2011 Inverclyde by-election	Labour	SNP	2015
2006 Blaenau Gwent by-election	Independent	Labour	2010
1986 South Down by-election	UUP	SDLP	1987
1983 Darlington by-election	Labour	Conservative	1983
1973 Dundee East by-election	Labour	SNP	February 1974
1960 Bolton East by-election	Conservative	Labour	1964
1928 Carmarthen by-election	Liberal	Labour	1929
1912 Hackney South by-election	Liberal	Independent^{2}	1918
1905 New Forest by-election	Conservative	Liberal	1906

^{1} Party did not contest the by-election.
^{2} The winner, Horatio Bottomley, was a former Liberal MP for the seat.

=== By-election gains overturned at next general election by another party ===
On rare occasions a party has gained a seat in the by-election yet has gone on to lose the seat at the subsequent general election to a party other than the previous incumbent.

By-election	Previously	Gain by	Lost to	General election
1995 Littleborough and Saddleworth by-election^{1}	Conservative	Liberal Democrats	Labour	1997
1920 South Norfolk by-election^{2}	National Liberal	Labour	Conservative	1922
1920 Dartford by-election	National Liberal	Labour	Constitutionalist	1922
1914 North East Derbyshire by-election	Labour	Conservative	Liberal	1918
1912 Hanley by-election	Labour	Liberal	National Democratic	1918

^{1} The seat was re-organised and renamed in 1997 as Oldham East and Saddleworth, which was still a notionally Conservative seat in 1992. The LibDem by-election victors lost instead to the Labour Party.
^{2} The Liberal Party did not contest the seat in 1922.

=== By-election victors had not contested previous general election ===
It is unusual for a political party which has not contested a seat at a general election to take it at a subsequent by-election. Independent candidates are not included.

By-election	Gain by	Majority percentage
2024 Rochdale by-election	Workers Party^{5}	18.4
2014 Rochester and Strood by-election	UKIP^{4}	7.3
2014 Clacton by-election	UKIP^{4}	35.1
2000 South Antrim by-election	DUP	2.7
1995 North Down by-election	UK Unionist	10.6
1982 Glasgow Hillhead by-election	SDP^{1}	6.8
1981 Crosby by-election	SDP^{1}	9.2
April 1981 Fermanagh and South Tyrone by-election	Anti H-Block	2.4
1973 Isle of Ely by-election	Liberal	3.3
1973 Lincoln by-election	Democratic Labour^{2}	35.0
1969 Mid Ulster by-election	Unity	6.6
1967 Hamilton by-election	SNP	4.5
1958 Torrington by-election	Liberal	0.6
1945 Chelmsford by-election	Common Wealth	15.0
1945 Motherwell by-election	SNP	2.8
1944 Skipton by-election	Common Wealth	12.4
1943 Eddisbury by-election	Common Wealth	2.7
1943 Belfast West by-election	NI Labour	12.8
1936 Ross and Cromarty by-election	National Labour	16.5
1936 Combined Scottish Universities by-election	National Labour	25.3
1934 Merthyr by-election	Labour	23.0
1930 Paddington South by-election	Empire Crusade	4.7
1929 Liverpool Scotland by-election	Labour	unopposed
1926 Kingston upon Hull Central by-election	Labour	15.3
1923 Mitcham by-election	Labour	3.9
1921 Kirkcaldy Burghs by-election	Labour	6.8
1921 Woolwich East by-election	Unionist^{3}	2.6

Notes:

^{1} Alliance partner the Liberal party had contested the seat.
^{2} The victor was the sitting MP, who had left the Labour party.
^{3} Candidate endorsed by the coalition government.
^{4} The victor was the sitting MP, who had left the Conservative party.
^{5} The candidate had previously served as an MP for both Labour and Respect parties

=== Additional victories by minor parties ===
In addition to the above section, other minor party successes include the following. For a complete list, see the list of minor party and independent MPs elected in the United Kingdom.

Candidate	Party	By-election	Votes	Percentage
Hannah Spencer	Green	2026 Gorton and Denton by-election	14,980	40.7
Sarah Pochin	Reform	2025 Runcorn and Helsby by-election	12,645	38.7
George Galloway	Workers Party	2024 Rochdale by-election	12,335	39.7
George Galloway	Respect	2012 Bradford West by-election	18,341	52.8
Dai Davies	Independent	2006 Blaenau Gwent by-election	12,543	46.7
James Kilfedder	UPUP	1986 North Down by-election	30,793	79.2
Owen Carron	Anti H-Block	1981 (August) Fermanagh and South Tyrone by-election	31,278	49.1
George Forrest	Ind. Unionist	1956 Mid Ulster by-election	28,605	48.4
James Carmichael	Ind. Labour Party	1946 Glasgow Bridgeton by-election	6,351	34.3

==== Minor parties' other strong performance ====
Minor parties without representation in the House of Commons which saved their deposit:

Party	By-election	Candidate	Votes	Percentage	Position	Notes
Alliance	1986 Belfast East by-election	Oliver Napier	5,917	17.4	2	Party historically represented at Westminster
Alliance	1986 Belfast North by-election	Paul Maguire	5,072	16.7	2	Party historically represented at Westminster
Alliance	1982 Belfast South by-election	David Cook	11,726	26.9	2	Party historically represented at Westminster
Alliance	1986 Belfast South by-election	David Cook	7,635	25.0	2	Party historically represented at Westminster
Alliance	1986 East Antrim by-election	Seán Neeson	5,405	15.1	2	Party historically represented at Westminster
Alliance	1986 North Down by-election	John Cushnahan	8,066	20.8	2	Party historically represented at Westminster
Alliance	1995 North Down by-election	Oliver Napier	6,970	25.4	3	Party historically represented at Westminster
Alliance	2000 South Antrim by-election	David Ford	2,031	6.6	5	Party represented in the Northern Ireland Assembly and historically at Westminster
All Party Alliance	1968 Oldham West by-election	John Creasey	3,389	13.2	3	
Brexit Party	2019 Peterborough by-election	Mike Greene	9,801	28.9	2	Party represented in the European Parliament and subsequently (as Reform UK) at Westminster
Brexit Party	2019 Brecon and Radnorshire by-election	Des Parkinson	3,331	10.5	3	Party represented in the European Parliament and subsequently (as Reform UK) at Westminster
BNP	1994 Dagenham by-election	John Tyndall	1,511	7.0	4	
BNP	2011 Barnsley Central by-election	Enis Dalton	1,463	6.0	4	Party represented in the European Parliament
BNP	2007 Sedgefield by-election	Andrew Spence	2,494	8.9	4	
BNP	2012 Rotherham by-election	Marlene Guest	1,804	8.5	3	Party represented in the European Parliament
Binface	2026 Clacton by-election	Count Binface	9,455	26.7	2	
English Democrat	2008 Haltemprice and Howden by-election	Joanne Robinson	1,714	7.2	3	
Green	2008 Haltemprice and Howden by-election	Shan Oakes	1,758	7.4	2	Party represented in the European Parliament and subsequently at Westminster
Green	2009 Norwich North by-election	Rupert Read	3,350	9.7	5	Party represented in the European Parliament and subsequently at Westminster
Green	1989 Vauxhall by-election	Henry Bewley	1,767	6.1	4	Party represented in the House of Lords
Independent	2013 Mid Ulster by-election	Nigel Lutton	12,781	34.4	2	DUP, UUP and TUV did not stand candidates and supported Lutton's candidacy
Independent	1946 Combined English Universities by-election	Mary Stocks	5,124	28.0	2	
Independent	1946 Combined English Universities by-election	Ernest Simon	4,028	22.0	3	
Independent	2024 Rochdale by-election	David Tully	6,638	21.34	2	
Independent	2021 Hartlepool by-election	Sam Lee	2,904	9.7	3	
Independent	2022 Wakefield by-election	Akef Akbar	2,090	7.7	3	
Independent	1986 East Londonderry by-election	Peter Barry	2,001	6.1	2	Fictitious paper candidate running as "For the Anglo-Irish Agreement"
Independent	2013 South Shields by-election	Ahmed Khan	1,331	5.4	4	
Independent	2011 Barnsley Central by-election	Tony Devoy	1,266	5.2	5	
Independent	1999 Hamilton South by-election	Stephen Mungall	1,075	5.5	5	
Independent	2007 Sedgefield by-election	Paul Gittins	1,885	6.7	5	
Independent	1986 South Antrim by-election	Peter Barry	1,870	5.9	2	Fictitious paper candidate running as "For the Anglo-Irish Agreement"
Independent	1986 Strangford by-election	Peter Barry	1,993	5.8	2	Fictitious paper candidate running as "For the Anglo-Irish Agreement"
Independent Labour	1946 Combined English Universities by-election	S. Wormald	3,414	18.7	4	
Independent Labour	1991 Liverpool Walton by-election	Lesley Mahmood	2,613	6.5	3	
Ind. Unionist	1946 Down by-election	J. Hastings-Little	16,895	17.1	3	
Ind. Unionist	1995 North Down by-election	Alan Chambers	2,170	7.9	4	
Anti-Partition	1948 Armagh by-election	James O'Reilly	16,284	40.3	2	
Irish Labour	1950 Belfast West by-election	Jack Beattie	30,833	49.2	2	Party previously and later represented at Westminster
Lincolnshire Independent	2016 Sleaford and North Hykeham by-election	Marianne Overton	2,892	8.8	5	
National Fellowship	1963 Bristol South East by-election	Edward Martell	4,834	19.0	2	
National Front	1973 West Bromwich by-election	Martin Webster	4,789	16.0	3	
NI Labour	1959 Belfast East by-election	James Gardner	14,264	42.2	2	Party represented in the Parliament of Northern Ireland and previously at Westminster
NI Labour	1952 Belfast South by-election	Samuel Napier	7,655	24.9	2	Party previously represented at Westminster
NI Labour	1963 Belfast South by-election	Norman Searight	7,209	25.8	2	Party represented in the Parliament of Northern Ireland and previously at Westminster
NI Labour	1946 Down by-election	Desmond Donnelly	28,846	29.3	2	Party represented in the Parliament of Northern Ireland and previously at Westminster
Peace	2012 Middlesbrough by-election	Imdad Hussain	1,060	6.3	5	
Plaid Cymru	1946 Aberdare by-election	Wynne Samuel	7,090	20.0	2	Party later represented at Westminster
Plaid Cymru	1954 Aberdare by-election	Gwynfor Evans	5,671	16.0	2	Party later represented at Westminster
Plaid Cymru	1972 Merthyr Tydfil by-election	Emrys Roberts	11,852	37.0	2	Party previously and later represented at Westminster
Plaid Cymru	1946 Ogmore by-election	T. R. Morgan	5,685	29.4	2	Party later represented at Westminster
People Before Profit	2011 Belfast West by-election	Gerry Carroll	1,751	7.6	3	Two members elected to the Dáil in 2011
Reform	2024 Wellingborough by-election	Ben Habib	3,919	13.0	3	Party later represented at Westminster
Reform	2024 Kingswood by-election	Rupert Lowe	2,578	10.4	3	Party later represented at Westminster
Reform	2024 Rochdale by-election	Simon Danczuk	1,968	6.3	6	Party later represented at Westminster
Reform	2021 Old Bexley and Sidcup by-election	Richard Tice	1,432	6.6	3	Party later represented at Westminster
Reform	2023 Tamworth by-election	Ian Cooper	1,373	5.4	3	Party later represented at Westminster
Respect	2004 Birmingham Hodge Hill by-election	John Rees	1,282	6.3	4	George Galloway MP was a party member, but was usually considered Independent Labour in Parliament at the time
Respect	2004 Leicester South by-election	Yvonne Ridley	3,724	12.7	4	George Galloway MP was a party member, but was usually considered Independent Labour in Parliament at the time
Restore	2026 Makerfield by-election	Rebecca Shepherd	3, 111	6.9	3	Party represented at Westminster through defection
SNP	1946 Glasgow Bridgeton by-election	Wendy Wood	2,575	13.9	4	Party previously and later represented at Westminster
SNP	1961 Glasgow Bridgeton by-election	Ian MacDonald	3,549	18.7	3	Party previously and later represented at Westminster
SNP	1967 Glasgow Pollok by-election	George Leslie	10,884	29.2	3	Party previously and later represented at Westminster
SNP	1970 South Ayrshire by-election	Sam Purdie	7,785	19.9	3	Party previously and later represented at Westminster
SNP	1962 West Lothian by-election	William Wolfe	9,750	23.3	2	Party previously and later represented at Westminster
Scottish Socialist	2000 Falkirk West by-election	Iain Hunter	989	5.1	4	Party represented in the Scottish Parliament
Scottish Socialist	2000 Glasgow Anniesland by-election	Charlie McCarthy	1,441	7.2	5	Party represented in the Scottish Parliament
Scottish Socialist	1999 Hamilton South by-election	Shareen Blackall	1,847	9.5	3	Party represented in the Scottish Parliament
SDP	1991 Neath by-election	John Warman	1,826	5.3	5	Party of same name which was dissolved in 1990 was represented in Parliament
Socialist Alliance	2000 Preston by-election	Terry Cartwright	1,210	5.7	4	
Socialist Alliance	2000 Tottenham by-election	Weyman Bennett	885	5.4	4	
Socialist Labour	1996 Barnsley East by-election	Ken Capstick	949	5.3	4	
Socialist Labour	1996 Hemsworth by-election	Brenda Nixon	1,193	5.4	4	
Socialist Labour	2002 Ogmore by-election	Christopher Herriot	1,152	6.3	5	
UKIP	2004 Hartlepool by-election	Stephen Allison	2,347	10.2	3	Party represented in the European Parliament
UKIP	2006 Bromley and Chislehurst by-election	Nigel Farage	2,347	8.1	3	Party represented in the European Parliament
UKIP	2009 Norwich North by-election	Glenn Tingle	4,068	11.8	4	Party represented in the European Parliament
UKIP	2011 Oldham East and Saddleworth by-election	Paul Nuttall	2,029	5.8	4	Party represented in the European Parliament
UKIP	2011 Barnsley Central by-election	Jane Collins	2,953	12.2	2	Party represented in the European Parliament
UKIP	2011 Feltham and Heston by-election	Andrew Charalambous	1,276	5.5	4	Party represented in the European Parliament
UKIP	2012 Cardiff South and Penarth by-election	Simon Zeigler	1,179	6.1	5	Party represented in the European Parliament
UKIP	2012 Corby by-election	Margot Parker	5,108	14.3	3	Party represented in the European Parliament
UKIP	2012 Rotherham by-election	Jane Collins	4,648	21.8	2	Party represented in the European Parliament
UKIP	2012 Middlesbrough by-election	Richard Elvin	1,990	11.8	2	Party represented in the European Parliament
UKIP	2012 Croydon North by-election	Winston McKenzie	1,400	5.7	3	Party represented in the European Parliament
UKIP	2013 Eastleigh by-election	Diane James	11,571	27.8	2	Party represented in the European Parliament
UKIP	2013 South Shields by-election	Richard Elvin	5,988	24.2	2	Party represented in the European Parliament
UKIP	2014 Wythenshawe and Sale East by-election	John Bickley	4,301	18.0	2	Party represented in the European Parliament
UKIP	2014 Newark by-election	Roger Helmer	10,028	25.9	2	Party represented in the European Parliament
UKIP	2014 Heywood and Middleton by-election	John Bickley	11,016	38.7	2	Party represented in the European Parliament, and also represented in the House of Commons following the Clacton by-election the same day.
Workers' Party	1986 Belfast North by-election	Seamus Lynch	3,563	11.8	3	
Workers' Party	1986 Lagan Valley by-election	John Lowry	3,328	9.3	2	
Workers' Party	1986 Upper Bann by-election	Tom French	6,978	19.2	2	
Workers Party	2021 Batley and Spen by-election	George Galloway	8,264	21.9	3	Party later represented at Westminster

=== Victory from third or lower place ===
- 2026 Aberdeen South by-election, gained by the Conservatives
- 2026 Gorton and Denton by-election, gained by the Greens
- 2022 Tiverton and Honiton by-election, gained by the Liberal Democrats
- 2021 North Shropshire by-election, gained by the Liberal Democrats
- 2012 Bradford West by-election, gained by Respect, from fifth place
- 2004 Leicester South by-election, gained by the Liberal Democrats
- 2003 Brent East by-election, gained by the Liberal Democrats
- 1988 Glasgow Govan by-election, gained by the SNP, from fourth place
- 1987 Greenwich by-election, gained by the SDP
- 1985 Brecon and Radnor by-election, gained by the Liberals
- 1983 Bermondsey by-election, gained by the Liberals
- 1981 Croydon North West by-election, gained by the Liberals
- 1973 Glasgow Govan by-election, gained by the SNP
- 1973 Berwick-upon-Tweed by-election, gained by the Liberals
- 1973 Ripon by-election, gained by the Liberals
- 1972 Sutton and Cheam by-election, gained by the Liberals
- 1966 Carmarthen by-election, gained by Plaid Cymru
- 1962 Orpington by-election, gained by the Liberals
- 1929 Holland with Boston by-election, gained by the Liberals

=== Incumbent party did not contest ===
- 2016 Richmond Park by-election (incumbent Conservative MP ran as an independent with party backing)
- 1995 North Down by-election (Ulster Popular Unionist Party disintegrated before by-election)
- 1976 Walsall North by-election (incumbent MP John Stonehouse had defected from Labour to the English National Party, who did not put up another candidate after he resigned)
- 1963 Bristol South East by-election (Conservative candidate awarded seat after 1961 by-election had agreed to stand aside, if law changed to permit disqualified Labour candidate to take his seat)
- 1942 Cardiff East by-election (Conservatives stood aside to allow election of National Government minister)
- 1940 City of London by-election (Conservatives stood aside to allow election of National Government minister)
- February 1940 Southampton by-election (National Liberals stood aside to allow election of National Government minister)
- 1938 Combined Scottish Universities by-election (National Labour stood aside to allow election of National Government minister)
- 1936 Ross and Cromarty by-election (National Liberals stood aside to allow election of National Government minister from National Labour)
- 1936 Combined Scottish Universities by-election (Conservatives stood aside to allow election of National Government minister from National Labour)
- 1935 Perth by-election (Conservatives stood aside to allow election of National Liberal)
- 1929 Liverpool Scotland by-election (lone mainland Irish Nationalist was essentially a Labour supporter)
- 1929 Preston by-election (Liberals acquiesced to William Jowitt becoming Labour's Attorney General)

=== Losers had been unopposed at previous election ===
- 1930 Paddington South by-election Conservative loss, gained by Empire Free Trade Crusade.
- 1929 Liverpool Scotland by-election Irish Nationalist loss, gained by Labour.^{1}
- 1928 Halifax by-election Speaker loss, gained by Labour.^{2}
- 1921 Kirkcaldy Burghs by-election Coalition Liberal loss, gained by Labour.
- 1921 Woolwich East by-election Labour loss, gained by Conservative.
- February 1920 The Wrekin by-election Coalition Liberal loss, gained by Independent.

Notes:

^{1} the Nationalists did not contest the by-election
^{2} the Speaker had originally been a Liberal MP.

=== Major party did not run ===
==== Great Britain ====
Labour, the Conservatives, the Liberal Democrats, and the Greens did not contest the 2026 Clacton by-election, with the Conservative leader calling the election "[Nigel] Farage's fake by-election".

Labour joined the Liberal Democrats, the Greens, and Reform UK in not contesting the 2022 Southend West by-election, out of respect following the murder of the previous MP, Sir David Amess.

The Conservatives declined to run a candidate in the 2016 Richmond Park by-election, instead backing Conservative incumbent Zac Goldsmith, who was designated as an independent.

The Conservatives, Liberal Democrats, UKIP, and Green Party declined to run candidates in the 2016 Batley and Spen by-election, due to the circumstances regarding the murder of the previous MP, Jo Cox.

Neither the Liberal Democrat nor the Labour Party stood candidates in the 2008 Haltemprice and Howden by-election. The by-election was a single-issue election in regards to government security policy, in which the Liberal Democrats supported the Conservative candidate.

The Conservative Party did not run a candidate in the 1963 Bristol South East by-election, the 1957 Carmarthen by-election, the 1948 Paisley by-election or the 1946 Ogmore by-election.

The Labour Party did not run in the 1945 City of London by-election, the 1945 Kensington South by-election or the 1946 Combined English Universities by-election.

Prior to 2008, the last by-election without an official Liberal Democrat, Liberal or SDP candidate had been the 1994 Newham North East by-election; the Lib Dems nominated a candidate, but he joined the Labour Party before the election. No official Liberal candidate was nominated for the 1980 Glasgow Central by-election, whilst no Liberal stood in either the 1973 Westhoughton by-election or the 1973 West Bromwich by-election, both held on 24 May 1973.

The last Scottish by-elections without official Scottish National Party candidates were the 1965 Roxburgh, Selkirk and Peebles by-election and the 1964 Rutherglen by-election.

Plaid Cymru did not stand a candidate for the 2019 Brecon and Radnorshire by-election, choosing instead to endorse the Liberal Democrat candidate in a "Stop Brexit" alliance. Prior to that, the last Welsh by-elections without official Welsh Nationalist candidates were the 1950 Abertillery by-election, the 1946 Pontypool by-election and the 1945 Monmouth by-election.

==== Northern Ireland ====
The more fluid nature of politics in Northern Ireland makes it harder to define all major parties. In addition many by-elections have not been contested by parties holding other seats in the House of Commons, whether due to agreements with other parties, poor organisation in the constituency or the particular circumstances on the by-election. However, for the period since 1981 (which saw the first by-elections in twelve years, during which time several major political realignments had occurred) the main parties are usually considered to be the Democratic Unionist Party, Sinn Féin, the Social Democratic and Labour Party (SDLP) and the Ulster Unionist Party.

At the 2013 Mid Ulster by-election. a single "unity" candidate was backed by the withdrawal of the Democratic Unionist Party, Ulster Conservatives and Unionists and Traditional Unionist Voice. Prior to Mid Ulster in 2013, the most recent examples of by-elections without official Democratic Unionist candidates were the 1995 North Down by-election and the 1990 Upper Bann by-election. They also did not stand in the twelve seats held by other Unionist parties in the 15 by-elections in 1986.

The last by-election without official candidates from either Sinn Féin or the SDLP was the 1995 North Down by-election. Both parties also declined to stand in the eleven Unionist majority seats in the 15 by-elections in 1986. The SDLP also did not contest either the April or August 1981 by-elections in Fermanagh and South Tyrone.

The last by-elections without official Ulster Unionist candidates prior to Mid Ulster in 2013 were North Antrim, East Belfast, Mid Ulster and North Down in the 15 by-elections in 1986.

The main British parties have generally not stood in seats in Northern Ireland. The by-election exceptions are the 1990 Upper Bann by-election (NI Conservatives and continuing SDP) and the 1995 North Down by-election (NI Conservatives). Prior to the 1970s the Ulster Unionists were effectively the local Conservatives, whilst the Liberals contested some but not all seats. The SDLP has traditionally seen itself as a "sister party" to the British Labour party, and its MPs usually accept the Labour whip in Parliament.

=== Miscellaneous notable results ===
It is unusual for one of the major parties to finish outside of the top three in England and Wales (or outside of the top four in Scotland). It is also unusual for the principal opposition party to suffer a significant reverse in its share of the vote or ranking.

Only three by-elections in Great Britain have seen all three major parties finish outside of the top two since 1945:

- The 1945 Combined Scottish Universities by-election, which had only two candidates: an independent, John Boyd Orr, won the election, and a candidate for the National Liberal Party (at that point, independent from both the Conservatives and Liberals) came second.
- The 2024 Rochdale by-election, with the Workers Party of Britain in first place and an independent in second. The incumbent Labour party fell from first to fourth place, with its largest-ever loss of vote share, after disowning their own candidate.
- The 2026 Gorton and Denton by-election, with the Green Party of England and Wales in first and Reform UK in second. Labour, the incumbents, fell to third, and both the Conservatives (fourth) and the Liberal Democrats (fifth) lost their deposits.

Other significant by-election results include:

- The 2021 Hartlepool by-election, with a 16% swing to the Conservatives, was the Labour Party's worst result in a Labour-held seat while the party was in Opposition, since the 1912 Hanley by-election.
- The 2019 Brecon and Radnorshire by-election saw Labour finish fourth behind the Liberal Democrats, Conservatives and Brexit Party. In addition, UKIP fell to last place, behind the Official Monster Raving Loony Party – a result compared to the continuing SDP's defeat in the 1990 Bootle by-election.
- The 2016 Richmond Park by-election was the first Liberal Democrat gain since 2010, showing tentative signs of recovery for the party. It also gave them a female MP for the first time in the 56th parliament. In addition it was the first occasion in more than a century of Labour losing their deposit in a London by-election.
- The 2014 Clacton by-election saw the election of the first UKIP MP on the largest swing ever against the Conservative Party. It was also the first time that a party had gained a seat not having contested the previous election since the 1973 Isle of Ely by-election. The Liberal Democrat's 1.4% of the vote was their worst result in an English seat since 1924.
- The 2013 Eastleigh by-election delivered several records. It was the first time in an English seat that both Labour and Conservative finished outside of the top two. For the first time, UKIP came close to winning a seat. It was the closest three-cornered English by-election since the 1921 Penistone by-election, and, aside from the 1946 Combined English Universities by-election, it was won with the lowest winning share of the vote since 1918. Aside from the contrived example of the 1989 Richmond (Yorks) by-election it was also the first time Labour had finished fourth in a by-election while in Opposition.
- At the 2012 Rotherham by-election, the Conservative party fell from second to fifth place (equalling its previous lowest position in a by-election in mainland Britain) while the Liberal Democrats fell from third place to eighth, the lowest ranking ever achieved by a major party in a by-election. This followed the 2011 Barnsley Central by-election, where the Liberal Democrats took sixth place, dropping from second at the 2010 general election. The Rotherham by-election was also the first recorded by-election result to have women in the top four places.
- In the 2009 Glasgow North East by-election and 1999 Hamilton South by-election the Liberal Democrats came sixth in both cases, equalling the worst ever placing by a major party in the UK. In 1999 the party had 634 votes while in Glasgow the party won 474 votes.
- At the 2008 Henley by-election the Labour Party finished in fifth place, the worst ranking for the party in its history, and a record low for any government in a UK mainland constituency. The lowest ever for an incumbent government was the 1990 Upper Bann by-election when the Conservatives came sixth, although they had not previously contested the seat.
- At the 2006 Blaenau Gwent by-election, held on the same day as Bromley and Chislehurst, the Conservative Party's fifth-place ranking equalled the worst-place achieved by a major party in England or Wales, a feat the Conservatives had first achieved in the same seat in the 2005 general election. The Blaenau victor, Dai Davies was the first independent to hold a seat previously occupied by an independent since Sir C.V.F. Townshend held The Wrekin in 1920.
- The drop in the Conservative share of the vote, 11.1%, at the 2006 Bromley and Chislehurst by-election was their worst result in a Conservative-held seat while in opposition since 1930^{1}. At the same by-election, the Labour Party's fall from second to fourth place was the first time the party had suffered such a reverse in an English seat.
- The Conservative Party fell from second to fourth place in the 2004 Hartlepool by-election and the 1983 Bermondsey by-election, and fell from third to fourth place in the 1991 Liverpool Walton by-election. At the time their worst ranking in an English by-election since at least 1945 was the drop from third place to fourth place in the 1974 Newham South by-election.
- The Labour party fell from second to fourth place in the 2000 Ceredigion by-election.
- At the Bootle by-election, 1990 the "continuing" SDP finished seventh out of eight candidates, behind the Monster Raving Loony Party, in a seat parts of which had once been in adjoining Crosby, scene of the party's greatest triumph only eight years previously.
- The Labour Party achieved fourth place in the 1989 Richmond (Yorks) by-election although this was contrived somewhat by the Social and Liberal Democrats and Social Democratic Party parties running separate candidates.
- At the 1976 Walsall North by-election, the Liberal Party could take only fifth place. Beaten by an independent and a minor party candidate, at the time, this was the worst placing for any major party in an English by-election since at least 1945.
- The last time the Liberals lost a by-election they were defending was at the 1957 Carmarthen by-election, defeated by the former Liberal MP turned Labour candidate, Lady Megan Lloyd George. The Liberal parliamentary contingent was thus reduced to five MPs, its lowest ever level.

Notes ^{1}Excluding the 1931 Westminster St George's by-election and the 1930 Paddington South by-election, which were essentially intra-Conservative contests, the previous worst result was, ironically, the 1930 Bromley by-election

== By-elections having national significance ==
- 2026 Makerfield by-election: Victory for Andy Burnham resulted in his return to Parliament, allowing him to challenge Keir Starmer in the 2026 Labour Party leadership crisis and causing Starmer's resignation. Burnham became prime minister one month later, winning the following leadership election as the only nominated candidate.
- 2026 Gorton and Denton by-election: The first ever Green gain in a by-election. Highlighted the widespread dissatisfaction of left wing voters, particularly young people, with the Labour party.
- 2024 Rochdale by-election: Victory for George Galloway and the Workers Party of Britain highlighted Labour's difficulties with Muslim voters due to its stance on the war in Gaza, presaging the success of several pro-Gaza independent candidates at the following general election.
- 2022 Tiverton and Honiton by-election and 2022 Wakefield by-election: A pair of by-election losses for the government on the same day – one in a rural area represented by the Conservatives since 1923 and one in a recently won "Red Wall" seat – triggered the resignation of Oliver Dowden as Chairman of the Conservative Party and contributed to the pressure on Prime Minister Boris Johnson that led to the collapse of his government two weeks later.
- 2017 Copeland by-election: A Conservative win in a previously safe Labour seat seemed to confirm the party's strong opinion poll lead and prompted an early election in which Labour ultimately achieved a net gain of 30 seats.
- 2016 Richmond Park by-election: After losing most of its seats in the 2015 general election, a Lib Dem gain on a large swing in a strongly Remain seat marked the beginning of a turnaround for the party and demonstrated the political effects of Brexit.
- 2014 Clacton by-election: The first by-election victory for the UK Independence Party
- 2008 Crewe and Nantwich by-election: A Conservative gain (from Labour in this case) at a by-election for the first time since 1982, and the first time as an opposition party since 1978, demonstrated the Conservatives were back in contention to possibly win the next general election.
- 2003 Brent East by-election: A Lib Dem gain of a Labour safe seat on a 29% swing demonstrated the political effect of public dissatisfaction with the Iraq War.
- 1997 Wirral South by-election: A Labour gain on a large swing just weeks before a general election confirmed the move in the party's favour was real and meant the Conservatives became a minority government.
- 1991 Liverpool Walton by-election: The Militant group, as Walton Real Labour, opposed a Labour candidate for the first time; their showing led to the decision to re-organise as Militant Labour without using entryist tactics.
- May 1990 Bootle by-election: The very poor showing of the 'continuing SDP' led to the party being wound up.
- 1987 Greenwich by-election: Defeat of a left-wing Labour candidate demonstrated the party's vulnerability.
- 1983 Darlington by-election: Labour's successful defence of a marginal seat stabilised the party, and secured the position of Leader Michael Foot.
- 1981 Crosby by-election: Victory of the Social Democratic Party in a rock-solid Conservative seat showed the national appeal of the party.
- April 1981 Fermanagh and South Tyrone by-election: Election of Maze prison hunger-striker Bobby Sands demonstrated that nationalist voters could support violent Republican candidates; taken by the Republican movement as a vindication of their stance, it led to the return of Sinn Féin as a major force in Northern Irish politics.
- 1977 Birmingham Stechford by-election: The loss of the seat to the Conservatives tipped Labour under James Callaghan into minority government status, necessitating the Lib–Lab pact.
- 1967 Hamilton by-election: Scottish National Party victory massively boosted the prospects of the party.
- 1966 Kingston upon Hull North by-election: Easy Labour victory in a marginal seat demonstrated to Prime Minister Harold Wilson that he would probably win a snap general election, and led to the construction of the Humber Bridge.
- 1965 Roxburgh, Selkirk and Peebles by-election: Rare Conservative loss in Opposition leads to resignation of leader Sir Alec Douglas-Home and election of Edward Heath as first democratically elected Conservative leader.
- 1965 Leyton by-election: Foreign Secretary Patrick Gordon-Walker, who was found the seat after losing Smethwick in 1964, is again defeated; he is forced to resign from the Government.
- 1963 Kinross and Western Perthshire by-election: Prime Minister Sir Alec Douglas-Home successfully returned to the House of Commons after disclaiming his peerage.
- 1962 Orpington by-election: A Liberal gain in a suburban seat led to a national revival for the party.
- 1961 Bristol South East by-election: Incumbent Labour MP Tony Benn re-elected after inheriting a peerage; the seat was awarded to the defeated Conservative, but the circumstances led to the Peerage Act 1963 allowing hereditary peerages to be disclaimed.
- 1938 Oxford by-election: After a campaign dominated by appeasement and the Munich agreement, the government candidate won.
- 1935 Liverpool Wavertree by-election: Intervention of Independent Conservative Randolph Churchill, on platform of rearmament and anti-Indian Home Rule, hands safe seat to Labour on largest ever swing (30%). Indication of hostility to National Government, and Prime Minister Ramsay MacDonald resigns within months.
- 1933 Fulham East by-election: Unexpected Labour gain in a previously safe Conservative constituency, ascribed to pacifism.
- 1922 Newport by-election: Election of an anti-Coalition Conservative in a tight three-way contest spurred on Conservative MPs to end their coalition with David Lloyd George.
- 1920 Dartford by-election: massive swing to Labour prefigures the party's eclipse of the Liberals.

== Firsts and lasts ==
- First (and currently only) by-election gain by Green Party of England and Wales: 2026 Gorton and Denton by-election
- First (and currently only) by-election gain by Reform UK: 2025 Runcorn and Helsby by-election
- First (and currently only) by-election gain by Workers Party of Britain: 2024 Rochdale by-election
- Most recent by-election to be called via the provisions of the Recall of MPs Act 2015: 2024 Wellingborough by-election
- First by-election to be called via the provisions of the Recall of MPs Act 2015: 2019 Peterborough by-election
- First by-election gain by the UK Independence Party: 2014 Clacton by-election
- Most recent by-election gain by an independent: 2006 Blaenau Gwent by-election
- Most recent by-election gain by a Northern Ireland party: 2000 South Antrim by-election (Democratic Unionist Party from Ulster Unionist Party)
- First by-election gain by a Northern Ireland party: 1943 Belfast West by-election (Northern Ireland Labour Party from Ulster Unionist Party)
- Last by-election gain by the Social Democratic Party (SDP): 1987 Greenwich by-election
- First by-election gain by the Social Democratic Party (SDP): 1981 Crosby by-election
- Last by-election gain by the Liberal Party: 1986 Ryedale by-election
- First by-election in which 18 year olds could vote, and party labels were included on the ballot: 1970 Bridgwater by-election
- First (and currently only) by-election gain by Plaid Cymru: 1966 Carmarthen by-election
- Most recent by-election result to be declared undue: 1961 Bristol South East by-election
- Last by-election in a university constituency: 1946 Combined Scottish Universities by-election
- Most recent unopposed by-election in England, Scotland or Wales: 1946 Hemsworth by-election
- Last by-election caused by appointment to ministerial office: 1926 East Renfrewshire by-election
- Last double member by-election: 1920 Stockport by-election
- Last by-election from what was to become the Irish Free State: 1919 Dublin University by-election
- Most recent by-election result to be declared void: 1892 Cirencester by-election
- First by-election subject to the Corrupt and Illegal Practices Prevention Act 1883: 1883 Limerick City by-election
- First by-election to be held using the secret ballot: 1872 Pontefract by-election

== See also ==
- Lists of United Kingdom by-elections
- United Kingdom European Parliament election records
- Swing (United Kingdom)
- Records of members of parliament of the United Kingdom
- United Kingdom general election records
