= List of MPs elected in the 1992 United Kingdom general election =

1992–1997 Parliament of the United Kingdom
←	1987–1992 Parliament	1997–2001 Parliament	→
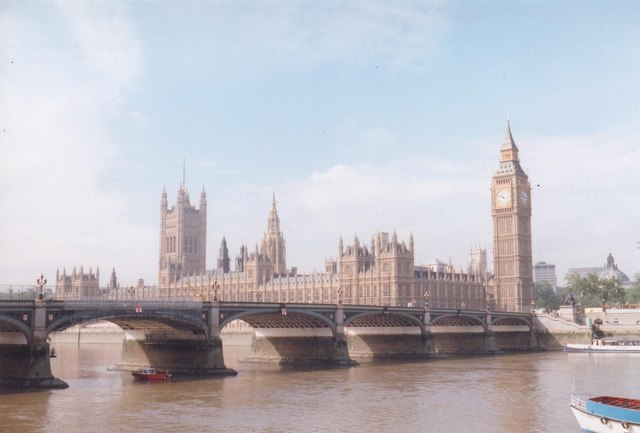
- Palace of Westminster in 1994

Overview
- Legislative body: Parliament of the United Kingdom
- Term: 9 April 1992 – 8 April 1997
- Election: 1992 United Kingdom general election
- Government: Second Major ministry

House of Commons
- Members: 651
- Speaker: Betty Boothroyd
- Leader: Tony Newton
- Prime Minister: John Major
- Leader of the Opposition: Neil Kinnock; John Smith; Margaret Beckett; Tony Blair
- Third-party leader: Paddy Ashdown

House of Lords
- Lord Chancellor: Baron Mackay of Clashfern

Crown-in-Parliament Elizabeth II

Sessions
- 1st: 27 April 1992 – 5 November 1993
- 2nd: 18 November 1993 – 3 November 1994
- 3rd: 16 November 1994 – 8 November 1995
- 4th: 15 November 1995 – 17 October 1996
- 5th: 23 October 1996 – 21 March 1997

This is a list of members of Parliament (MPs) elected in the 1992 general election, held on 9 April.

During the 1992–97 Parliament, Betty Boothroyd was the Speaker, John Major served as Prime Minister, and Neil Kinnock, John Smith, Margaret Beckett, and Tony Blair served as Leader of the Opposition. This Parliament was dissolved on 8 April 1997.

== By nation ==
- List of MPs for constituencies in Scotland (1992–1997)
- List of MPs for constituencies in Wales (1992–1997)

== Composition ==
These representative diagrams show the composition of the parties as it was directly after the 1992 general election and before the 1997 general election:

Note: The Scottish National Party and Plaid Cymru sit together as a party group. This is not the official seating plan of the House of Commons, which has five rows of benches on each side, with the government party to the right of the speaker and opposition parties to the left, but with room for only around two-thirds of MPs to sit at any one time.

Affiliation	Members
Conservative Party	336
Labour Party	271
Liberal Democrats	20
Ulster Unionist Party	9
Plaid Cymru	4
Social Democratic and Labour Party	4
Democratic Unionist Party	3
Scottish National Party	3
Ulster Popular Unionist Party	1
Total	651
Notional government majority	21
Effective government majority	46

Table of contents:

A B C D E F G H I J K L M N O P Q R S T U V W X Y Z By-elections

=== A ===
Constituency	MP	Party
Aberavon	John Morris	Labour
Aberdeen North	Robert Hughes	Labour
Aberdeen South	Raymond Robertson	Conservative
Aldershot	Sir Julian Critchley	Conservative
Aldridge-Brownhills	Richard Shepherd	Conservative
Altrincham and Sale	Sir Fergus Montgomery	Conservative
Alyn and Deeside	Barry Jones	Labour
Amber Valley	Phillip Oppenheim	Conservative
Angus East	Andrew Welsh	Scottish National Party
Antrim East	Roy Beggs	Ulster Unionist
Antrim North	Rev Ian Paisley	Democratic Unionist
Antrim South	Clifford Forsythe	Ulster Unionist
Argyll and Bute	Ray Michie	Liberal Democrat
Arundel	Sir Michael Marshall	Conservative
Ashfield	Geoff Hoon	Labour
Ashford	Keith Speed	Conservative
Ashton-under-Lyne	Robert Sheldon	Labour
Aylesbury	David Lidington	Conservative
Ayr	Phil Gallie	Conservative
=== B ===
Banbury	Tony Baldry	Conservative
Banff and Buchan	Alex Salmond	Scottish National Party
Barking	Jo Richardson	Labour
Barnsley Central	Eric Illsley	Labour
Barnsley East	Terry Patchett	Labour
Barnsley West and Penistone	Michael Clapham	Labour
Barrow and Furness	John Hutton	Labour
Basildon	David Amess	Conservative
Basingstoke	Andrew Hunter	Conservative
Bassetlaw	Joe Ashton	Labour
Bath	Don Foster	Liberal Democrat
Batley and Spen	Elizabeth Peacock	Conservative
Battersea	John Bowis	Conservative
Beaconsfield	Tim Smith	Conservative
Beckenham	Piers Merchant	Conservative
Bedfordshire Mid	Sir Nicholas Lyell	Conservative
Bedfordshire North	Sir Trevor Skeet	Conservative
Bedfordshire South West	Sir David Madel	Conservative
Belfast East	Peter Robinson	Democratic Unionist
Belfast North	Cecil Walker	Ulster Unionist
Belfast South	Martin Smyth	Ulster Unionist
Belfast West	Dr Joe Hendron	Social Democratic and Labour
Berkshire East	Andrew MacKay	Conservative
Berwick-upon-Tweed	Alan Beith	Liberal Democrat
Bethnal Green and Stepney	Peter Shore	Labour
Beverley	James Cran	Conservative
Bexhill and Battle	Charles Wardle	Conservative
Bexleyheath	Cyril Townsend	Conservative
Billericay	Teresa Gorman	Conservative
Birkenhead	Frank Field	Labour
Birmingham Edgbaston	Dame Jill Knight	Conservative
Birmingham Erdington	Robin Corbett	Labour
Birmingham Hall Green	Andrew Hargreaves	Conservative
Birmingham, Hodge Hill	Terry Davis	Labour
Birmingham Ladywood	Clare Short	Labour
Birmingham Northfield	Richard Burden	Labour
Birmingham Perry Barr	Jeff Rooker	Labour
Birmingham Selly Oak	Lynne Jones	Labour
Birmingham Small Heath	Roger Godsiff	Labour
Birmingham Sparkbrook	Roy Hattersley	Labour
Birmingham Yardley	Estelle Morris	Labour
Bishop Auckland	Derek Foster	Labour
Blaby	Andrew Robathan	Conservative
Blackburn	Jack Straw	Labour
Blackpool North	Harold Elletson	Conservative
Blackpool South	Nick Hawkins	Conservative
Blaenau Gwent	Llew Smith	Labour
Blaydon	John McWilliam	Labour
Blyth Valley	Ronnie Campbell	Labour
Bolsover	Dennis Skinner	Labour
Bolton North East	Peter Thurnham	Conservative
Bolton South East	David Young	Labour
Bolton West	Tom Sackville	Conservative
Boothferry	David Davis	Conservative
Bootle	Joe Benton	Labour
Bosworth	David Tredinnick	Conservative
Bournemouth East	David Atkinson	Conservative
Bournemouth West	John Butterfill	Conservative
Bow and Poplar	Mildred Gordon	Labour
Bradford North	Terry Rooney	Labour
Bradford South	Bob Cryer	Labour
Bradford West	Max Madden	Labour
Braintree	Tony Newton	Conservative
Brecon and Radnor	Jonathan Evans	Conservative
Brent East	Ken Livingstone	Labour
Brent North	Sir Rhodes Boyson	Conservative
Brent South	Paul Boateng	Labour
Brentford and Isleworth	Nirj Deva	Conservative
Brentwood and Ongar	Eric Pickles	Conservative
Bridgend	Win Griffiths	Labour
Bridgwater	Tom King	Conservative
Bridlington	John Townend	Conservative
Brigg and Cleethorpes	Michael Brown	Conservative
Brighton Kemptown	Andrew Bowden	Conservative
Brighton Pavilion	Sir Derek Spencer	Conservative
Bristol East	Jean Corston	Labour
Bristol North West	Michael Stern	Conservative
Bristol South	Dawn Primarolo	Labour
Bristol West	William Waldegrave, Baron Waldegrave of North Hill	Conservative
Bromsgrove	Roy Thomason	Conservative
Broxbourne	Marion Roe	Conservative
Broxtowe	Jim Lester	Conservative
Buckingham	George Walden	Conservative
Burnley	Peter Pike	Labour
Burton	Ivan Lawrence	Conservative
Bury North	Alistair Burt	Conservative
Bury South	David Sumberg	Conservative
Bury St Edmunds	Richard Spring	Conservative
=== C ===
Caernarfon	Dafydd Wigley	Plaid Cymru
Caerphilly	Ron Davies	Labour
Caithness and Sutherland	Robert Maclennan	Liberal Democrat
Calder Valley	Sir Donald Thompson	Conservative
Cambridge	Anne Campbell	Labour
Cambridgeshire North East	Malcolm Moss	Conservative
Cambridgeshire South East	James Paice	Conservative
Cambridgeshire South West	Sir Anthony Grant	Conservative
Cannock and Burntwood	Tony Wright	Labour
Canterbury	Julian Brazier	Conservative
Cardiff Central	Jon Owen Jones	Labour
Cardiff North	Gwilym Jones	Conservative
Cardiff South and Penarth	Alun Michael	Labour
Cardiff West	Rhodri Morgan	Labour
Carlisle	Eric Martlew	Labour
Carmarthen	Alan W. Williams	Labour
Carrick, Cumnock and Doon Valley	George Foulkes	Labour
Carshalton and Wallington	Nigel Forman	Conservative
Castle Point	Dr Bob Spink	Conservative
Ceredigion and Pembroke North	Cynog Dafis	Plaid Cymru/Green
Cheadle	Stephen Day	Conservative
Chelmsford	Simon Burns	Conservative
Chelsea	Sir Nicholas Scott	Conservative
Cheltenham	Nigel Jones	Liberal Democrat
Chertsey and Walton	Sir Geoffrey Pattie	Conservative
Chesham & Amersham	Cheryl Gillan	Conservative
Chester	Gyles Brandreth	Conservative
Chesterfield	Tony Benn	Labour
Chichester	Anthony Nelson	Conservative
Chingford	Iain Duncan Smith	Conservative
Chipping Barnet	Sydney Chapman	Conservative
Chislehurst	Roger Sims	Conservative
Chorley	Den Dover	Conservative
Christchurch	Robert Adley	Conservative
Cirencester and Tewkesbury	Geoffrey Clifton-Brown	Conservative
City of London and Westminster South	Peter Brooke, Baron Brooke of Sutton Mandeville	Conservative
Clackmannan	Martin O'Neill	Labour
Clwyd North West	Rod Richards	Conservative
Clwyd South West	Martyn Jones	Labour
Clydebank & Milngavie	Tony Worthington	Labour
Clydesdale	Jimmy Hood	Labour
Colchester North	Bernard Jenkin	Conservative
Colchester South and Maldon	John Whittingdale	Conservative
Colne Valley	Graham Riddick	Conservative
Congleton	Ann Winterton	Conservative
Conwy	Sir Wyn Roberts	Conservative
Copeland	Dr Jack Cunningham	Labour
Corby	William Powell	Conservative
Cornwall North	Paul Tyler	Liberal Democrat
Cornwall South East	Robert Hicks	Conservative
Coventry North East	Bob Ainsworth	Labour
Coventry North West	Geoffrey Robinson	Labour
Coventry South East	Jim Cunningham	Labour
Coventry South West	John Butcher	Conservative
Crawley	Nicholas Soames	Conservative
Crewe and Nantwich	Gwyneth Dunwoody	Labour
Crosby	Malcolm Thornton	Conservative
Croydon Central	Sir Paul Beresford	Conservative
Croydon North East	David Congdon	Conservative
Croydon North West	Malcolm Wicks	Labour
Croydon South	Richard Ottaway	Conservative
Cumbernauld & Kilsyth	Norman Hogg	Labour
Cunninghame North	Brian Wilson	Labour
Cunninghame South	Brian Donohoe	Labour
Cynon Valley	Ann Clwyd	Labour
=== D ===
Dagenham	Bryan Gould	Labour
Darlington	Alan Milburn	Labour
Dartford	Bob Dunn	Conservative
Daventry	Tim Boswell	Conservative
Davyhulme	Winston Churchill	Conservative
Delyn	David Hanson	Labour
Denton and Reddish	Andrew Bennett	Labour
Derby North	Greg Knight	Conservative
Derby South	Margaret Beckett	Labour
Derbyshire North East	Harry Barnes	Labour
Derbyshire South	Edwina Currie	Conservative
Derbyshire West	Patrick McLoughlin	Conservative
Devizes	Michael Ancram	Conservative
Devon North	Nick Harvey	Liberal Democrat
Dewsbury	Ann Taylor	Labour
Don Valley	Martin Redmond	Labour
Doncaster Central	Sir Harold Walker	Labour
Doncaster North	Kevin Hughes	Labour
Dorset North	Nicholas Baker	Conservative
Dorset South	Ian Bruce	Conservative
Dorset West	Sir James Spicer	Conservative
Dover	David Shaw	Conservative
Down North	Sir James Kilfedder	Ulster Popular Unionist
Down South	Eddie McGrady	Social Democratic and Labour
Dudley East	Dr John Gilbert	Labour
Dudley West	John Blackburn	Conservative
Dulwich	Tessa Jowell	Labour
Dumbarton	John McFall	Labour
Dumfries	Sir Hector Monro	Conservative
Dundee East	John McAllion	Labour
Dundee West	Ernie Ross	Labour
Dunfermline East	Gordon Brown	Labour
Dunfermline West	Rachel Squire	Labour
Durham, City of	Gerry Steinberg	Labour
Durham North	Giles Radice	Labour
Durham North West	Hilary Armstrong	Labour
=== E ===
Ealing Acton	Sir George Young	Conservative
Ealing North	Harry Greenway	Conservative
Ealing Southall	Piara Khabra	Labour
Easington	John Cummings	Labour
East Kilbride	Adam Ingram	Labour
East Lindsey	Sir Peter Tapsell	Conservative
East Lothian	John Home Robertson	Labour
Eastbourne	Nigel Waterson	Conservative
Eastleigh	Stephen Milligan	Conservative
Eastwood	Allan Stewart	Conservative
Eccles	Joan Lestor	Labour
Eddisbury	Alastair Goodlad	Conservative
Edinburgh Central	Alistair Darling	Labour
Edinburgh East	Gavin Strang	Labour
Edinburgh Leith	Malcolm Chisholm	Labour
Edinburgh Pentlands	Malcolm Rifkind	Conservative
Edinburgh South	Nigel Griffiths	Labour
Edinburgh West	Lord James Douglas-Hamilton	Conservative
Edmonton	Dr Ian Twinn	Conservative
Ellesmere Port and Neston	Andrew Miller	Labour
Elmet	Spencer Batiste	Conservative
Eltham	Peter Bottomley	Conservative
Enfield North	Timothy Eggar	Conservative
Enfield Southgate	Michael Portillo	Conservative
Epping Forest	Steven Norris	Conservative
Epsom & Ewell	Archie Hamilton	Conservative
Erewash	Angela Knight	Conservative
Erith and Crayford	David Evennett	Conservative
Esher	Ian Taylor	Conservative
Exeter	Sir John Hannam	Conservative
=== F ===
Falkirk East	Michael Connarty	Labour
Falkirk West	Dennis Canavan	Labour
Falmouth and Camborne	Sebastian Coe	Conservative
Fareham	Peter Lloyd	Conservative
Faversham	Sir Roger Moate	Conservative
Feltham and Heston	Alan Keen	Labour Co-operative
Fermanagh & South Tyrone	Ken Maginnis	Ulster Unionist
Fife Central	Henry McLeish	Labour
Fife North East	Menzies Campbell	Liberal Democrat
Finchley	Hartley Booth	Conservative
Folkestone and Hythe	Michael Howard	Conservative
Foyle	John Hume	Social Democratic and Labour
Fulham	Matthew Carrington	Conservative
Fylde	Michael Jack	Conservative
=== G ===
Gainsborough and Horncastle	Edward Leigh	Conservative
Galloway and Upper Nithsdale	Ian Lang	Conservative
Gateshead East	Joyce Quin	Labour
Gedling	Andrew Mitchell	Conservative
Gillingham	James Couchman	Conservative
Glanford and Scunthorpe	Elliot Morley	Labour
Glasgow Cathcart	John Maxton	Labour
Glasgow Central	Mike Watson	Labour
Glasgow Garscadden	Donald Dewar	Labour
Glasgow Govan	Ian Davidson	Labour
Glasgow Hillhead	George Galloway	Labour
Glasgow Maryhill	Maria Fyfe	Labour
Glasgow Pollok	Jimmy Dunnachie	Labour
Glasgow Provan	Jimmy Wray	Labour
Glasgow Rutherglen	Tommy McAvoy	Labour
Glasgow Shettleston	David Marshall	Labour
Glasgow Springburn	Michael Martin	Labour
Gloucester	Douglas French	Conservative
Gloucestershire West	Paul Marland	Conservative
Gordon	Malcolm Bruce	Liberal Democrat
Gosport	Peter Viggers	Conservative
Gower	Gareth Wardell	Labour
Grantham	Douglas Hogg, 3rd Viscount Hailsham	Conservative
Gravesham	Jacques Arnold	Conservative
Great Grimsby	Austin Mitchell	Labour
Great Yarmouth	Michael Carttiss	Conservative
Greenock and Port Glasgow	Norman Godman	Labour
Greenwich	Nick Raynsford	Labour
Guildford	David Howell	Conservative
=== H ===
Hackney North and Stoke Newington	Diane Abbott	Labour
Hackney South and Shoreditch	Brian Sedgemore	Labour
Halesowen and Stourbridge	Warren Hawksley	Conservative
Halifax	Alice Mahon	Labour
Halton	Gordon Oakes	Labour
Hamilton	George Robertson	Labour
Hammersmith	Clive Soley	Labour
Hampstead and Highgate	Glenda Jackson	Labour
Hampshire East	Michael Mates	Conservative
Hampshire North West	Sir David Mitchell	Conservative
Harborough	Edward Garnier	Conservative
Harlow	Jerry Hayes	Conservative
Harrogate	Robert Banks	Conservative
Harrow East	Hugh Dykes	Conservative
Harrow West	Robert Hughes	Conservative
Hartlepool	Peter Mandelson	Labour
Harwich	Iain Sproat	Conservative
Hastings and Rye	Jacqui Lait	Conservative
Havant	David Willetts	Conservative
Hayes and Harlington	Terry Dicks	Conservative
Hazel Grove	Sir Tom Arnold	Conservative
Hemsworth	Derek Enright	Labour
Hendon North	Sir John Gorst	Conservative
Hendon South	John Marshall	Conservative
Henley	Michael Heseltine	Conservative
Hereford	Colin Shepherd	Conservative
Hertford & Stortford	Sir Bowen Wells	Conservative
Hertfordshire North	Oliver Heald	Conservative
Hertfordshire South West	Richard Page	Conservative
Hertfordshire West	Robert Jones	Conservative
Hertsmere	James Clappison	Conservative
Hexham	Peter Atkinson	Conservative
Heywood and Middleton	James Callaghan	Labour
High Peak	Charles Hendry	Conservative
Holborn and St Pancras	Frank Dobson	Labour
Holland-with-Boston	Sir Richard Body	Conservative
Honiton	Sir Peter Emery	Conservative
Hornchurch	Robin Squire	Conservative
Hornsey and Wood Green	Barbara Roche	Labour
Horsham	Sir Peter Hordern	Conservative
Houghton and Washington	Roland Boyes	Labour
Hove	Sir Tim Sainsbury	Conservative
Huddersfield	Barry Sheerman	Labour
Huntingdon	John Major	Conservative
Hyndburn	Greg Pope	Labour
=== I ===
Ilford North	Vivian Bendall	Conservative
Ilford South	Mike Gapes	Labour Co-operative
Inverness, Nairn and Lochaber	Sir Russell Johnston	Liberal Democrat
Ipswich	Jamie Cann	Labour
Isle of Wight	Barry Field	Conservative
Islington North	Jeremy Corbyn	Labour
Islington South and Finsbury	Chris Smith	Labour
Islwyn	Neil Kinnock	Labour
=== J ===
Jarrow	Donald Dixon	Labour
=== K ===
Keighley	Gary Waller	Conservative
Kensington	Dudley Fishburn	Conservative
Kent Mid	Andrew Rowe	Conservative
Kettering	Roger Freeman	Conservative
Kilmarnock and Loudoun	William McKelvey	Labour
Kincardine and Deeside	George Kynoch	Conservative
Kingston upon Hull East	John Prescott	Labour
Kingston upon Hull North	Kevin McNamara	Labour
Kingston upon Hull West	Stuart Randall	Labour
Kingston-upon-Thames	Norman Lamont	Conservative
Kingswood	Roger Berry	Labour
Kirkcaldy	Lewis Moonie	Labour
Knowsley North	George Howarth	Labour
Knowsley South	Edward O'Hara	Labour
=== L ===
Lagan Valley	James Molyneaux	Ulster Unionist
Lancashire West	Colin Pickthall	Labour
Lancaster	Dame Elaine Kellett-Bowman	Conservative
Langbaurgh	Michael Bates	Conservative
Leeds Central	Derek Fatchett	Labour
Leeds East	George Mudie	Labour
Leeds North East	Timothy Kirkhope	Conservative
Leeds North West	Dr Keith Hampson	Conservative
Leeds West	John Battle	Labour
Leicester East	Keith Vaz	Labour
Leicester South	Jim Marshall	Labour
Leicester West	Greville Janner	Labour
Leicestershire North West	David Ashby	Conservative
Leigh	Lawrence Cunliffe	Labour
Leominster	Peter Temple-Morris	Conservative
Lewes	Tim Rathbone	Conservative
Lewisham Deptford	Joan Ruddock	Labour
Lewisham East	Bridget Prentice	Labour
Lewisham West	Jim Dowd	Labour
Leyton	Harry Cohen	Labour
Lincoln	Kenneth Carlisle	Conservative
Linlithgow	Tam Dalyell	Labour
Littleborough and Saddleworth	Geoffrey Dickens	Conservative
Liverpool Broadgreen	Jane Kennedy	Labour
Liverpool Garston	Edward Loyden	Labour
Liverpool Mossley Hill	David Alton	Liberal Democrat
Liverpool Riverside	Robert Parry	Labour
Liverpool Walton	Peter Kilfoyle	Labour
Liverpool West Derby	Bob Wareing	Labour
Livingston	Robin Cook	Labour
Llanelli	Denzil Davies	Labour
Londonderry East	William Ross	Ulster Unionist
Loughborough	Stephen Dorrell	Conservative
Ludlow	Christopher Gill	Conservative
Luton North	John Carlisle	Conservative
Luton South	Graham Bright	Conservative
=== M ===
Macclesfield	Nicholas Winterton	Conservative
Maidstone	Ann Widdecombe	Conservative
Makerfield	Ian McCartney	Labour
Manchester Blackley	Kenneth Eastham	Labour
Manchester Central	Bob Litherland	Labour
Manchester Gorton	Gerald Kaufman	Labour
Manchester Withington	Keith Bradley	Labour
Manchester Wythenshawe	Alfred Morris	Labour
Mansfield	Alan Meale	Labour
Medway	Dame Peggy Fenner	Conservative
Meirionnydd Nant Conwy	Elfyn Llwyd	Plaid Cymru
Meriden	Iain Mills	Conservative
Merthyr Tydfil and Rhymney	Ted Rowlands	Labour
Mid Ulster	William McCrea	Democratic Unionist
Middlesbrough	Stuart Bell	Labour
Midlothian	Eric Clarke	Labour
Milton Keynes South West	Barry Legg	Conservative
Milton Keynes North East	Peter Butler	Conservative
Mitcham and Morden	Dame Angela Rumbold	Conservative
Mole Valley	Kenneth Baker	Conservative
Monklands East	John Smith	Labour
Monklands West	Tom Clarke	Labour
Monmouth	Roger Evans	Conservative
Montgomeryshire	Alex Carlile	Liberal Democrat
Moray	Margaret Ewing	Scottish National Party
Morecambe and Lunesdale	Mark Lennox-Boyd	Conservative
Morley and Leeds South	John Gunnell	Labour
Motherwell North	John Reid	Labour
Motherwell South	Jeremy Bray	Labour
=== N ===
Neath	Peter Hain	Labour
New Forest	Patrick McNair-Wilson	Conservative
Newark	Richard Alexander	Conservative
Newbury	Judith Chaplin	Conservative
Newcastle-under-Lyme	Llin Golding	Labour
Newcastle upon Tyne Central	Jim Cousins	Labour
Newcastle upon Tyne East	Nick Brown	Labour
Newcastle upon Tyne North	Doug Henderson	Labour
Newham North East	Ron Leighton	Labour
Newham North West	Tony Banks	Labour
Newham South	Nigel Spearing	Labour
Newport East	Roy Hughes	Labour
Newport West	Paul Flynn	Labour
Newry & Armagh	Seamus Mallon	Social Democratic and Labour
Normanton	Bill O'Brien	Labour
Norfolk Mid	Richard Ryder	Conservative
Norfolk North	Ralph Howell	Conservative
Norfolk South	John MacGregor	Conservative
Norfolk South West	Gillian Shephard	Conservative
Norfolk North West	Henry Bellingham	Conservative
Northampton North	Antony Marlow	Conservative
Northampton South	Michael Morris	Conservative
Northavon	Sir John Cope	Conservative
Norwich North	Patrick Thompson	Conservative
Norwich South	John Garrett	Labour
Norwood	John Fraser	Labour
Nottingham East	John Heppell	Labour
Nottingham North	Graham Allen	Labour
Nottingham South	Alan Simpson	Labour
Nuneaton	Bill Olner	Labour
=== O ===
Ogmore	Ray Powell	Labour
Old Bexley and Sidcup	Sir Edward Heath	Conservative
Oldham Central and Royton	Bryan Davies	Labour
Oldham West	Michael Meacher	Labour
Orkney and Shetland	Jim Wallace	Liberal Democrat
Orpington	John Horam	Conservative
Oxford East	Andrew Smith	Labour
Oxford West and Abingdon	John Patten	Conservative
=== P ===
Paisley North	Irene Adams	Labour
Paisley South	Gordon McMaster	Labour
Peckham	Harriet Harman	Labour
Pembrokeshire	Nick Ainger	Labour
Pendle	Gordon Prentice	Labour
Penrith and the Border	David Maclean	Conservative
Perth and Kinross	Sir Nicholas Fairbairn	Conservative
Peterborough	Dr Brian Mawhinney	Conservative
Plymouth Devonport	David Jamieson	Labour
Plymouth Drake	Dame Janet Fookes	Conservative
Plymouth Sutton	Gary Streeter	Conservative
Pontefract and Castleford	Geoffrey Lofthouse	Labour
Pontypridd	Kim Howells	Labour
Poole	John Ward	Conservative
Portsmouth North	Peter Griffiths	Conservative
Portsmouth South	David Martin	Conservative
Preston	Audrey Wise	Labour
Pudsey	Sir Giles Shaw	Conservative
Putney	David Mellor	Conservative
=== R ===
Ravensbourne	Sir John Hunt	Conservative
Reading East	Sir Gerard Vaughan	Conservative
Reading West	Sir Tony Durant	Conservative
Redcar	Mo Mowlam	Labour
Reigate	Sir George Gardiner	Conservative
Renfrew West and Inverclyde	Tommy Graham	Labour
Rhondda	Allan Rogers	Labour
Ribble Valley	Nigel Evans	Conservative
Ribble South	Robert Atkins	Conservative
Richmond (Yorks)	William Hague	Conservative
Richmond and Barnes	Jeremy Hanley	Conservative
Rochdale	Liz Lynne	Liberal Democrat
Rochford	Dr Michael Clark	Conservative
Romford	Sir Michael Neubert	Conservative
Romsey and Waterside	Michael Colvin	Conservative
Ross, Cromarty and Skye	Charles Kennedy	Liberal Democrat
Rossendale and Darwen	Janet Anderson	Labour
Rother Valley	Kevin Barron	Labour
Rotherham	James Boyce	Labour
Roxburgh and Berwickshire	Archy Kirkwood	Liberal Democrat
Rugby and Kenilworth	Jim Pawsey	Conservative
Ruislip-Northwood	John Wilkinson	Conservative
Rushcliffe	Kenneth Clarke	Conservative
Rutland and Melton	Alan Duncan	Conservative
Ryedale	John Greenway	Conservative
=== S ===
Saffron Walden	Alan Haselhurst	Conservative
St Albans	Peter Lilley	Conservative
St Helens North	John Evans	Labour
St Helens South	Gerry Bermingham	Labour
St Ives	David Harris	Conservative
Salford East	Stanley Orme	Labour
Salisbury	Robert Key	Conservative
Scarborough	John Sykes	Conservative
Sedgefield	Tony Blair	Labour
Selby	Michael Alison	Conservative
Sevenoaks	Mark Wolfson	Conservative
Sheffield Attercliffe	Clive Betts	Labour
Sheffield Brightside	David Blunkett	Labour
Sheffield Central	Richard Caborn	Labour
Sheffield Hallam	Sir Irvine Patnick	Conservative
Sheffield Heeley	Bill Michie	Labour
Sheffield Hillsborough	Helen Jackson	Labour
Sherwood	Paddy Tipping	Labour
Shipley	Sir Marcus Fox	Conservative
Shoreham	Michael Stephen	Conservative
Shrewsbury and Atcham	Derek Conway	Conservative
Shropshire North	John Biffen	Conservative
Skipton and Ripon	David Curry	Conservative
Slough	John Watts	Conservative
Solihull	John M. Taylor	Conservative
Somerton and Frome	Mark Robinson	Conservative
South Hams	Anthony Steen	Conservative
South Shields	Dr David Clark	Labour
Southampton Itchen	John Denham	Labour
Southampton Test	Sir James Hill	Conservative
Southend East	Sir Teddy Taylor	Conservative
Southend West	Paul Channon	Conservative
Southport	Matthew Banks	Conservative
Southwark and Bermondsey	Simon Hughes	Liberal Democrat
Spelthorne	David Wilshire	Conservative
Stafford	Bill Cash	Conservative
Staffordshire Mid	Michael Fabricant	Conservative
Staffordshire Moorlands	Sir David Knox	Conservative
Staffordshire South	Patrick Cormack	Conservative
Staffordshire South East	David Lightbown	Conservative
Stalybridge and Hyde	Tom Pendry	Labour
Stamford and Spalding	Quentin Davies	Conservative
Stevenage	Timothy Wood	Conservative
Stirling	Michael Forsyth	Conservative
Stockport	Ann Coffey	Labour
Stockton North	Frank Cook	Labour
Stockton South	Tim Devlin	Conservative
Stoke-on-Trent Central	Mark Fisher	Labour
Stoke-on-Trent North	Joan Walley	Labour
Stoke-on-Trent South	George Stevenson	Labour
Strangford	John D. Taylor	Ulster Unionist
Stratford-on-Avon	Alan Howarth	Conservative
Strathkelvin and Bearsden	Dr Sam Galbraith	Labour
Streatham	Keith Hill	Labour
Stretford	Tony Lloyd	Labour
Stroud	Roger Knapman	Conservative
Suffolk Central	Michael Lord	Conservative
Suffolk Coastal	John Gummer	Conservative
Suffolk South	Tim Yeo	Conservative
Sunderland North	Bill Etherington	Labour
Sunderland South	Chris Mullin	Labour
Surbiton	Richard Tracey	Conservative
Surrey East	Peter Ainsworth	Conservative
Surrey North West	Sir Michael Grylls	Conservative
Surrey South West	Virginia Bottomley	Conservative
Sussex Mid	Tim Renton	Conservative
Sutton and Cheam	Lady Olga Maitland	Conservative
Sutton Coldfield	Sir Norman Fowler	Conservative
Swansea East	Donald Anderson	Labour
Swansea West	Alan J. Williams	Labour
Swindon	Simon Coombs	Conservative
=== T ===
Tatton	Neil Hamilton	Conservative
Taunton	David Nicholson	Conservative
Tayside North	Bill Walker	Conservative
Thanet North	Roger Gale	Conservative
Thanet South	Jonathan Aitken	Conservative
Teignbridge	Patrick Nicholls	Conservative
Thurrock	Andrew Mackinlay	Labour
Tiverton	Angela Browning	Conservative
Tonbridge and Malling	Sir John Stanley	Conservative
Tooting	Tom Cox	Labour
Torbay	Rupert Allason	Conservative
Torfaen	Paul Murphy	Labour
Torridge and West Devon	Emma Nicholson	Conservative
Tottenham	Bernie Grant	Labour
Truro	Matthew Taylor	Liberal Democrat
Tunbridge Wells	Sir Patrick Mayhew	Conservative
Tweeddale, Ettrick and Lauderdale	Sir David Steel	Liberal Democrat
Twickenham	Toby Jessel	Conservative
Tyne Bridge	David Clelland	Labour
Tynemouth	Neville Trotter	Conservative
=== U ===
Upminster	Sir Nicholas Bonsor	Conservative
Upper Bann	David Trimble	Ulster Unionist
Uxbridge	Michael Shersby	Conservative
=== V ===
Vale of Glamorgan	Walter Sweeney	Conservative
Vauxhall	Kate Hoey	Labour
=== W ===
Wakefield	David Hinchliffe	Labour
Wallasey	Angela Eagle	Labour
Wallsend	Stephen Byers	Labour
Walsall North	David Winnick	Labour
Walsall South	Bruce George	Labour
Walthamstow	Neil Gerrard	Labour
Wansbeck	Jack Thompson	Labour
Wansdyke	Jack Aspinwall	Conservative
Wanstead and Woodford	James Arbuthnot	Conservative
Wantage	Robert V. Jackson	Conservative
Warley East	Andrew Faulds	Labour
Warley West	John Spellar	Labour
Warrington North	Doug Hoyle	Labour
Warrington South	Mike Hall	Labour
Warwick and Leamington	Sir Dudley Smith	Conservative
Warwickshire North	Mike O'Brien	Labour
Watford	Tristan Garel-Jones	Conservative
Waveney	David Porter	Conservative
Wealden	Sir Geoffrey Johnson-Smith	Conservative
Wellingborough	Sir Peter Fry	Conservative
Wells	David Heathcoat-Amory	Conservative
Welwyn Hatfield	David Evans	Conservative
Wentworth	Peter Hardy	Labour
West Bromwich East	Peter Snape	Labour
West Bromwich West	Betty Boothroyd	Labour
Westbury	David Faber	Conservative
Western Isles	Calum MacDonald	Labour
Westminster North	Sir John Wheeler	Conservative
Westmorland and Lonsdale	Michael Jopling	Conservative
Weston-super-Mare	Sir Jerry Wiggin	Conservative
Wigan	Roger Stott	Labour
Wiltshire North	Richard Needham	Conservative
Wimbledon	Dr Charles Goodson-Wickes	Conservative
Winchester	Gerry Malone	Conservative
Windsor and Maidenhead	Michael Trend	Conservative
Wirral South	Barry Porter	Conservative
Wirral West	David Hunt	Conservative
Witney	Douglas Hurd	Conservative
Woking	Sir Cranley Onslow	Conservative
Wokingham	John Redwood	Conservative
Wolverhampton North East	Ken Purchase	Labour Co-operative
Wolverhampton South East	Dennis Turner	Labour Co-operative
Wolverhampton South West	Nicholas Budgen	Conservative
Woodspring	Dr Liam Fox	Conservative
Woolwich	John Austin-Walker	Labour
Worcester	Peter Luff	Conservative
Worcestershire Mid	Eric Forth	Conservative
Worcestershire South	Michael Spicer	Conservative
Workington	Dale Campbell-Savours	Labour
Worsley	Terence Lewis	Labour
Worthing	Sir Terence Higgins	Conservative
The Wrekin	Bruce Grocott	Labour
Wrexham	Dr John Marek	Labour
Wycombe	Ray Whitney	Conservative
Wyre	Keith Mans	Conservative
Wyre Forest	Anthony Coombs	Conservative
=== Y ===
Yeovil	Paddy Ashdown	Liberal Democrat
Ynys Môn	Ieuan Wyn Jones	Plaid Cymru
York	Hugh Bayley	Labour

== By-elections ==
See the list of United Kingdom by-elections.

Two seats were vacant when Parliament was dissolved preparatory to the 1997 general election:

- Meriden: Iain Mills (Con) died 13 January 1997
- Don Valley: Martin Redmond (Lab) died 16 January 1997

One further MP died prior to the 1997 general election (who was standing down due to health problems, incidentally) during the period in which parliament was dissolved:

- North Dorset: Nicholas Baker (Con) died 25 April 1997

== Defections ==
- 1995 Alan Howarth (Stratford-on-Avon) defects from Con to Lab.
- 1995 Emma Nicholson (Devon West and Torridge) defects from Con to Lib Dem.
- 1996 Peter Thurnham (Bolton North East) defects from Con to Lib Dem, with eight months as an independent.
- March 1997 George Gardiner (Reigate) defects from Con to Referendum Party.

== Progression of government majority and party totals ==
The government voting total is the total number of Conservative MPs, minus the two Conservative Deputy Speakers. The opposition voting total is the total number of other MPs, minus the Speaker and the Labour Deputy Speaker. The majority is the difference between the former and the latter. See also here.

Date	Event	Govt majority	Con	Labour	L Dem	UUP	Plaid	SDLP	DUP	SNP	UPUP	UKUP	Refer	Indep.	Spkr	Vacant
27 April 1992	Opening of Parliament	21	336	270	20	9	4	4	3	3	1	0	0	0	1	0
19 February 1993	Chaplin (Con, Newbury) dies	20	335	270	20	9	4	4	3	3	1	0	0	0	1	1
6 May 1993	Rendel wins Newbury by-election for L Dems	19	335	270	21	9	4	4	3	3	1	0	0	0	1	0
13 May 1993	Adley (Con, Christchurch) dies	18	334	270	21	9	4	4	3	3	1	0	0	0	1	1
23 July 1993	Allason suspended from Conservatives	16	333	270	21	9	4	4	3	3	1	0	0	1	1	1
29 July 1993	Maddock wins Christchurch by-election for L Dems	15	333	270	22	9	4	4	3	3	1	0	0	1	1	0
25 January 1994	Boyce (Lab, Rotherham) dies	16	333	269	22	9	4	4	3	3	1	0	0	1	1	1
1 February 1994	Richardson (Lab, Barking) dies	17	333	268	22	9	4	4	3	3	1	0	0	1	1	2
7 February 1994	Milligan (Con, Eastleigh) dies	16	332	268	22	9	4	4	3	3	1	0	0	1	1	3
28 February 1994	Leighton (Lab, Newham NE) dies	17	332	267	22	9	4	4	3	3	1	0	0	1	1	4
12 April 1994	Cryer (Lab, Bradford S) dies	18	332	266	22	9	4	4	3	3	1	0	0	1	1	5
5 May 1994	MacShane wins Rotherham by-election for Lab	17	332	267	22	9	4	4	3	3	1	0	0	1	1	4
12 May 1994	Smith (Lab, Monklands E) dies	18	332	266	22	9	4	4	3	3	1	0	0	1	1	5
May 1994	Gould (Lab, Dagenham) resigns seat	19	332	265	22	9	4	4	3	3	1	0	0	1	1	6
9 June 1994	5 by-elections – 4 won by Lab, 1 by Lib Dems	14	332	269	23	9	4	4	3	3	1	0	0	1	1	1
30 June 1994	Liddell wins Monklands E by-election for Lab	13	332	270	23	9	4	4	3	3	1	0	0	1	1	0
28 July 1994	Allason re-admitted to Conservatives	15	333	270	23	9	4	4	3	3	1	0	0	0	1	0
12 October 1994	Blackburn (Con, Dudley W) dies	14	332	270	23	9	4	4	3	3	1	0	0	0	1	1
29 November 1994	Maastricht Rebels suspended from Conservatives	-4	323	270	23	9	4	4	3	3	1	0	0	9	1	1
15 December 1994	Pearson wins Dudley W by-election for Lab	-5	323	271	23	9	4	4	3	3	1	0	0	9	1	0
January 1995	Kinnock (Lab, Islwyn) resigns seat	-4	323	270	23	9	4	4	3	3	1	0	0	9	1	1
16 February 1995	Touhig wins Islwyn by-election for Lab	-5	323	271	23	9	4	4	3	3	1	0	0	9	1	0
19 February 1995	Fairbairn (Con, Perth & Kinross) dies	-6	322	271	23	9	4	4	3	3	1	0	0	9	1	1
20 March 1995	Kilfedder (UPUP, N Down) dies	-5	322	271	23	9	4	4	3	3	0	0	0	9	1	2
24 April 1995	Maastricht Rebels readmitted to Conservatives	13	331	271	23	9	4	4	3	3	0	0	0	0	1	2
17 May 1995	Dickens (Con, Littleborough & Saddleworth) dies	12	330	271	23	9	4	4	3	3	0	0	0	0	1	3
25 May 1995	Cunningham wins Perth & Kinross by-el for SNP	11	330	271	23	9	4	4	3	4	0	0	0	0	1	2
15 June 1995	McCartney wins N Down by-election for UKUP	10	330	271	23	9	4	4	3	4	0	1	0	0	1	1
27 July 1995	Davies wins Littleborough by-election for L Dems	9	330	271	24	9	4	4	3	4	0	1	0	0	1	0
8 October 1995	Howarth defects from Con to Labour	7	329	272	24	9	4	4	3	4	0	1	0	0	1	0
31 October 1995	Enright (Lab, Hemsworth) dies	8	329	271	24	9	4	4	3	4	0	1	0	0	1	1
12 December 1995	Lightbown (Con, SE Staffordshire) dies	7	328	271	24	9	4	4	3	4	0	1	0	0	1	2
30 December 1995	Nicholson defects from Con to Lib Dems	5	327	271	25	9	4	4	3	4	0	1	0	0	1	2
1 February 1996	Trickett wins Hemsworth by-election for Lab	4	327	272	25	9	4	4	3	4	0	1	0	0	1	1
24 February 1996	Thurnham resigns from Conservatives	2	326	272	25	9	4	4	3	4	0	1	0	1	1	1
11 April 1996	Jenkins wins SE Staffs by-election for Lab	1	326	273	25	9	4	4	3	4	0	1	0	1	1	0
11 October 1996	Patchett (Lab, Barnsley E) dies	2	326	272	25	9	4	4	3	4	0	1	0	1	1	1
12 October 1996	Thurnham (Ind) joins Liberal Democrats	2	326	272	26	9	4	4	3	4	0	1	0	0	1	1
3 November 1996	Porter (Con, Wirral S) dies	1	325	272	26	9	4	4	3	4	0	1	0	0	1	2
12 December 1996	Ennis wins Barnsley E by-election for Lab	0	325	273	26	9	4	4	3	4	0	1	0	0	1	1
16 January 1997	Mills (Con) and Redmond (Lab) die	0	324	272	26	9	4	4	3	4	0	1	0	0	1	3
27 February 1997	Chapman wins Wirral S by-election for Lab	-1	324	273	26	9	4	4	3	4	0	1	0	0	1	2
8 March 1997	Gardiner defects from Con to Referendum	-3	323	273	26	9	4	4	3	4	0	1	1	0	1	2

== See also ==
- List of MPs for constituencies in Scotland (1992–1997)
