= List of MPs for constituencies in Scotland (1992–1997) =

- Colours on map indicate the party allegiance of each constituency's MP.

This is a list of the 72 Members of Parliament (MPs) elected to the House of Commons of the United Kingdom by Scottish constituencies for the Fifty-First Parliament of the United Kingdom (1992 to 1997) at the 1992 general election.

== Composition at election ==
Affiliation	Members
Labour Party	49
Liberal Democrats	9
Scottish National Party	3
Conservative Party	11
Total	72

== Composition at dissolution ==
Affiliation	Members
Labour Party	49
Scottish Liberal Democrats	9
Scottish National Party	4
Conservative Party	10
Total	72

== List ==
Constituency	MP	Party	Notes
Aberdeen North	Robert Hughes	Labour	
Aberdeen South	Raymond Robertson	Conservative	
Argyll and Bute	Ray Michie	Liberal Democrats	
Ayr	Phil Gallie	Conservative	
Banff and Buchan	Alex Salmond	SNP	
Caithness and Sutherland	Robert Maclennan	Liberal Democrats	
Carrick, Cumnock and Doon Valley	George Foulkes	Labour Co-operative	
Central Fife	Henry McLeish	Labour	
Clackmannan	Martin O'Neill	Labour	
Clydebank and Milngavie	Tony Worthington	Labour	
Clydesdale	Jimmy Hood	Labour	
Cumbernauld and Kilsyth	Norman Hogg	Labour	
Cunninghame North	Brian Wilson	Labour	
Cunninghame South	Brian Donohoe	Labour	
Dumbarton	John McFall	Labour Co-operative	
Dumfries	Hector Monro	Conservative	
Dundee East	John McAllion	Labour	
Dundee West	Ernie Ross	Labour	
Dunfermline East	Gordon Brown	Labour	
Dunfermline West	Rachel Squire	Labour	
East Angus	Andrew Welsh	SNP	
East Kilbride	Adam Ingram	Labour	
East Lothian	John Home Robertson	Labour	
Eastwood	Allan Stewart	Conservative	
Edinburgh Central	Alistair Darling	Labour	
Edinburgh East	Gavin Strang	Labour	
Edinburgh Leith	Malcolm Chisholm	Labour	
Edinburgh Pentlands	Malcolm Rifkind	Conservative	
Edinburgh South	Nigel Griffiths	Labour	
Edinburgh West	James Douglas-Hamilton	Conservative	
Falkirk East	Michael Connarty	Labour	
Falkirk West	Dennis Canavan	Labour	
Galloway and Upper Nithsdale	Ian Lang	Conservative	
Glasgow Cathcart	John Maxton	Labour	
Glasgow Central	Mike Watson	Labour	
Glasgow Garscadden	Donald Dewar	Labour	
Glasgow Govan	Ian Davidson	Labour	
Glasgow Hillhead	George Galloway	Labour	
Glasgow Maryhill	Maria Fyfe	Labour	
Glasgow Pollok	Jimmy Dunnachie	Labour	
Glasgow Provan	Jimmy Wray	Labour	
Glasgow Rutherglen	Thomas McAvoy	Labour Co-operative	
Glasgow Shettleston	David Marshall	Labour	
Glasgow, Springburn	Michael Martin	Labour	
Gordon	Malcolm Bruce	Liberal Democrat	
Greenock and Port Glasgow	Norman Godman	Labour	
Hamilton	George Robertson	Labour	
Inverness, Nairn and Lochaber	Russell Johnston	Liberal Democrat	
Kilmarnock and Loudoun	Willie McKelvey	Labour	
Kincardine and Deeside	George Kynoch	Conservative	
Kirkcaldy	Dr Lewis Moonie	Labour Co-operative	
Linlithgow	Sir Tam Dalyell	Labour	
Livingston	Robin Cook	Labour	
Midlothian	Eric Clarke	Labour	
Monklands East	John Smith	Labour	1994 By-election
Monklands West	Tom Clarke	Labour	
Moray	Margaret Ewing	SNP	
Motherwell North	John Reid	Labour	
Motherwell South	Jeremy Bray	Labour	
North East Fife	Sir Menzies Campbell	Liberal Democrat	
North Tayside	Bill Walker	Conservative	
Orkney and Shetland	Jim Wallace	Liberal Democrat	
Paisley North	Irene Adams	Labour	
Paisley South	Gordon McMaster	Labour	
Perth and Kinross	Nicholas Fairbairn	Conservative	1995 By-election
Renfrew West and Inverclyde	Tommy Graham	Labour	
Ross, Cromarty and Skye	Charles Kennedy	Liberal Democrat	
Roxburgh and Berwickshire	Archy Kirkwood	Liberal Democrat	
Stirling	Michael Forsyth	Conservative	Secretary of State for Scotland (1995–1997)
Strathkelvin and Bearsden	Sam Galbraith	Labour	
Tweeddale, Ettrick and Lauderdale	David Steel	Liberal Democrat	
Western Isles	Calum Macdonald	Labour	

== By-elections ==
- 1994 Monklands East by-election, Helen Liddell, Labour
- 1995 Perth and Kinross by-election, Roseanna Cunningham, SNP

== See also ==
- Lists of MPs for constituencies in Scotland
