= Bute and Northern Ayrshire =

Parliamentary constituency in the United Kingdom, 1918–1983

- Former county constituency for the House of Commons
- Subdivisions of Scotland: Buteshire, Ayrshire

1918–1983
- Seats: One
- Created from: Buteshire; North Ayrshire
- Replaced by: Argyll & Bute; Cunninghame North; Cunninghame South

Bute and Northern Ayrshire was a county constituency of the House of Commons of the Parliament of the United Kingdom from 1918 to 1983. It elected one Member of Parliament (MP) by the first past the post voting system.

== History ==
The constituency was formed by combining Buteshire (which historically included the islands of Arran, Great Cumbrae and Little Cumbrae) with part of North Ayrshire. The rest of Ayrshire North was merged into Kilmarnock.

In 1918 the constituency consisted of "The county of Bute, inclusive of all burghs, situated therein, and the county district of Northern Ayr, inclusive of all burghs situated therein except insofar as included in the Ayr District of Burghs".

In 1950 some of the constituency was transferred to the then new constituency of Central Ayrshire.

In 1983, Bute and Northern Ayrshire was divided between Argyll and Bute and Cunninghame North.

== Boundaries ==
1918–1950: The county of Bute, and the county district of Northern Ayr, inclusive of all burghs therein except in so far as included in the Ayr District of Burghs.

1950–1955: The county of Bute, the burghs of Ardrossan, Largs, and Saltcoats, and the district of Saltcoats.

1955–1983: The county of Bute, the burghs of Ardrossan, Largs, Saltcoats, and Stevenston, and the district of Saltcoats.

== Members of Parliament ==
Election	Member	Party
1918	Sir Aylmer Hunter-Weston	Unionist
1935	Sir Charles MacAndrew	Unionist
1959	Sir Fitzroy Maclean	Unionist
Feb 1974	John Corrie	Conservative
1983	constituency abolished: see Argyll and Bute & Cunninghame North	

== Election results ==
=== Elections in the 1910s ===
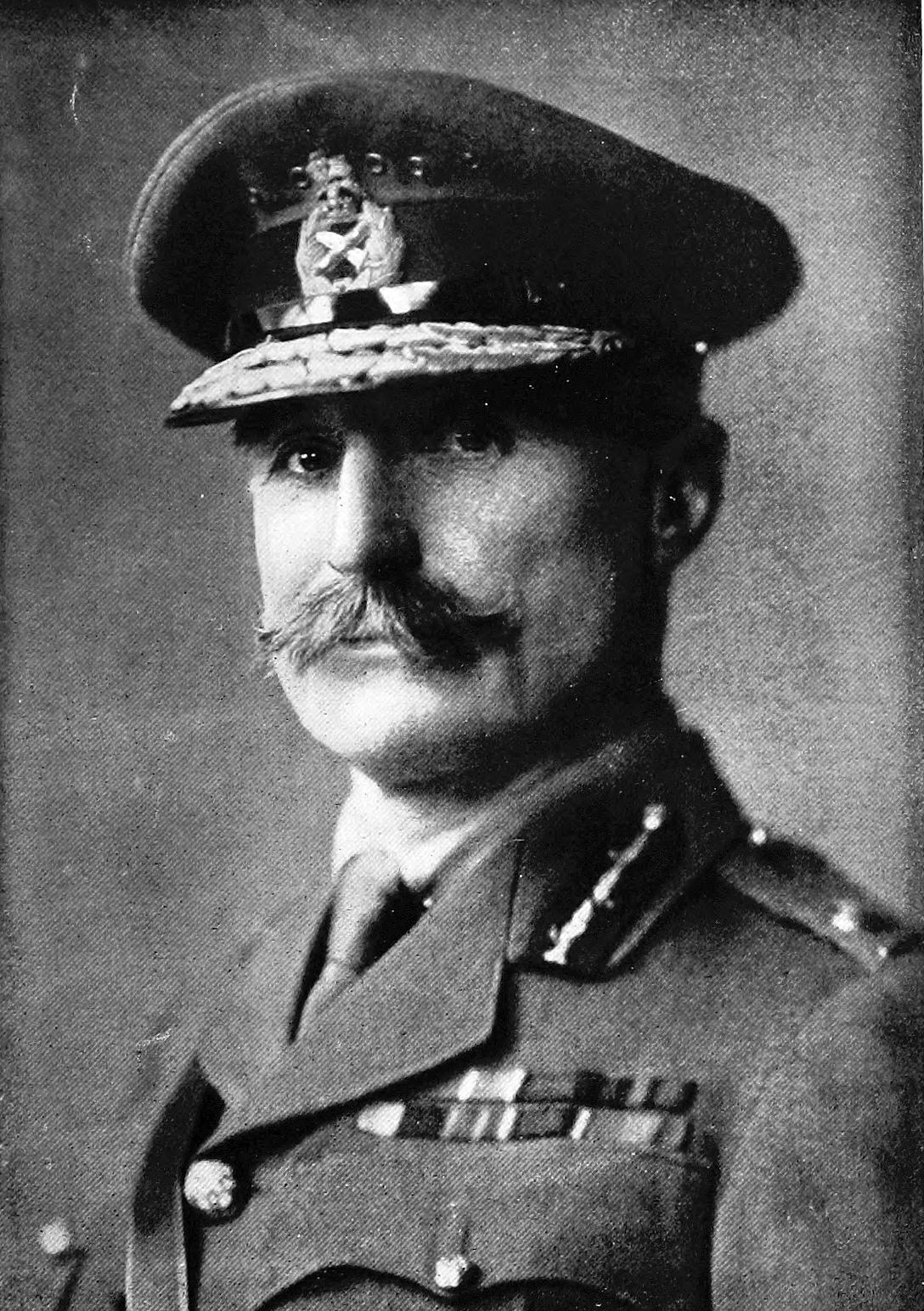
Hunter-Weston

General election 1918: Bute & Northern Ayrshire
Party		Candidate	Votes	%	±%
C	Unionist	Aylmer Hunter-Weston	12,638	61.5	
	Labour	Robert Smith	5,848	28.5	
	Liberal	Hugh Fraser Campbell	2,059	10.0	
Majority			6,790	33.0	
Turnout			20,545	55.3	
Registered electors			37,158		
	Unionist win (new seat)				
C indicates candidate endorsed by the coalition government.

=== Elections in the 1920s ===
General election 1922: Bute & Northern Ayrshire
Party	Candidate	Votes	%	±%
Unionist	Aylmer Hunter-Weston	14,368	60.6	−0.9
Labour	John Paton	9,323	39.4	+10.9
Majority		5,045	21.2	−11.8
Turnout		23,691	59.5	+4.2
Registered electors		39,817		
Unionist hold		Swing	−5.9	

General election 1923: Bute & Northern Ayrshire
Party	Candidate	Votes	%	±%
Unionist	Aylmer Hunter-Weston	12,320	55.6	−5.0
Labour	Peter Campbell Stephen	9,855	44.4	+5.0
Majority		2,465	11.2	−10.0
Turnout		22,175	55.9	−3.6
Registered electors		39,685		
Unionist hold		Swing	−5.0	

General election 1924: Bute & Northern Ayrshire
Party	Candidate	Votes	%	±%
Unionist	Aylmer Hunter-Weston	16,203	61.7	+6.1
Labour	Peter Campbell Stephen	10,075	38.3	−6.1
Majority		6,128	23.4	+12.2
Turnout		26,278	65.6	+9.7
Registered electors		40,076		
Unionist hold		Swing	+6.1	

General election 1929: Bute and Northern Ayrshire
Party	Candidate	Votes	%	±%
Unionist	Aylmer Hunter-Weston	18,331	56.2	−5.5
Labour	Alexander Sloan	14,294	43.8	+5.5
Majority		4,037	12.4	−11.0
Turnout		32,625	65.2	−0.4
Registered electors		50,032		
Unionist hold		Swing	−5.5	

=== Elections in the 1930s ===
General election 1931: Bute and Northern Ayrshire
Party	Candidate	Votes	%	±%
Unionist	Aylmer Hunter-Weston	24,467	70.5	+14.3
Ind. Labour Party	Alexander Sloan	10,227	29.5	−14.3
Majority		14,240	41.0	+28.6
Turnout		34,694	67.9	+2.7
Registered electors		51,095		
Unionist hold		Swing		

General election 1935: Bute and Northern Ayrshire
Party	Candidate	Votes	%	±%
Unionist	Charles MacAndrew	22,391	62.6	−7.9
Labour	Maurice Shinwell	13,358	37.4	N/A
Majority		9,033	25.2	−15.8
Turnout		35,749	66.6	−1.3
Registered electors		53,682		
Unionist hold		Swing		

General Election 1939–40: Another General Election was required to take place before the end of 1940. The political parties had been making preparations for an election to take place from 1939 and by the end of this year, the following candidates had been selected;

- Unionist: Charles MacAndrew
- Labour:

=== Elections in the 1940s ===
General election 1945: Bute and Northern Ayrshire
Party	Candidate	Votes	%	±%
Unionist	Charles MacAndrew	21,652	53.0	−9.6
Labour	John Wheatley	19,209	47.0	+9.6
Majority		2,443	6.0	−19.2
Turnout		40,861	68.5	+1.9
Registered electors		59,657		
Unionist hold		Swing	−9.6	

=== Elections in the 1950s ===
General election 1950: Bute and North Ayrshire
Party	Candidate	Votes	%	±%
Unionist	Charles MacAndrew	22,019	64.2	+11.2
Labour	G Aitken	12,243	35.7	−11.3
Majority		9,776	28.5	+22.5
Turnout		34,262		
Unionist hold		Swing		

General election 1951: Bute and North Ayrshire
Party	Candidate	Votes	%	±%
Unionist	Charles MacAndrew	22,361	64.2	0.0
Labour	Dickson Mabon	12,492	35.8	+0.1
Majority		9,869	28.4	−0.1
Turnout		34,853		
Unionist hold		Swing		

General election 1955: Bute and North Ayrshire
Party	Candidate	Votes	%	±%
Unionist	Charles MacAndrew	20,338	64.5	+0.3
Labour	David Lambie	11,183	35.5	−0.3
Majority		9,155	29.0	+0.6
Turnout		31,521		
Unionist hold		Swing		

General election 1959: Bute and North Ayrshire
Party	Candidate	Votes	%	±%
Unionist	Fitzroy Maclean	20,270	62.4	−2.1
Labour	David Lambie	12,218	37.6	+2.1
Majority		8,052	24.8	−4.2
Turnout		32,488		
Unionist hold		Swing		

=== Elections in the 1960s ===
General election 1964: Bute and North Ayrshire
Party	Candidate	Votes	%	±%
Unionist	Fitzroy Maclean	16,497	49.8	−12.6
Labour	David Lambie	11,934	36.0	−1.6
Liberal	Richard J. Gammon	4,671	14.1	New
Majority		4,563	13.8	−11.0
Turnout		33,102		
Unionist hold		Swing		

General election 1966: Bute and North Ayrshire
Party	Candidate	Votes	%	±%
Conservative	Fitzroy Maclean	16,138	48.7	−1.1
Labour	David Lambie	13,482	40.7	+4.7
Liberal	Robert P. Cochrane	3,539	10.7	−3.4
Majority		2,656	8.0	−5.8
Turnout		33,159	76.0	
Conservative hold		Swing	−2.8	

=== Elections in the 1970s ===
General election 1970: Bute and North Ayrshire
Party	Candidate	Votes	%	±%
Conservative	Fitzroy Maclean	18,853	53.6	+4.9
Labour	Hugh G. Millar	12,459	35.4	−5.3
SNP	Peggy Macrae	3,852	10.9	New
Majority		6,394	18.2	+10.2
Turnout		35,164	73.0	−3.0
Conservative hold		Swing	+5.1	

General election February 1974: Bute and North Ayrshire
Party	Candidate	Votes	%	±%
Conservative	John Corrie	17,166	45.7	−7.9
Labour	Raymond D. Donnelly	10,436	27.8	−7.6
SNP	John A. Murphy	6,104	16.3	+5.4
Liberal	R. Stevenson	3,832	10.2	New
Majority		6,730	17.9	−0.3
Turnout		37,538	77.0	+4.0
Conservative hold		Swing		

General election October 1974: Bute and North Ayrshire
Party	Candidate	Votes	%	±%
Conservative	John Corrie	13,599	38.9	−6.8
Labour	J.N. Carson	10,093	28.9	+1.1
SNP	John A. Murphy	9,055	25.9	+9.6
Liberal	R. Stevenson	2,224	6.4	−3.8
Majority		3,506	10.0	−7.9
Turnout		34,971	71.3	−5.7
Conservative hold		Swing		

General election 1979: Bute and North Ayrshire
Party	Candidate	Votes	%	±%
Conservative	John Corrie	17,317	45.7	+6.8
Labour	M.G. Smith	13,004	34.3	+5.4
SNP	M. Brown	5,272	13.9	−12.0
Liberal	P. Giffney	2,280	6.0	−0.4
Majority		4,313	11.4	+1.4
Turnout		37,873	75.8	+4.5
Conservative hold		Swing		

== See also ==
- Former United Kingdom Parliament constituencies
