= Cunninghame North =

Cunninghame North can refer to:

- Cunninghame North (UK Parliament constituency)
- Cunninghame North (Scottish Parliament constituency)
