= Cunninghame South =

Cunninghame South may refer to:

- Cunninghame South (UK Parliament constituency)
- Cunninghame South (Scottish Parliament constituency)
