= Worcestershire and South Warwickshire (European Parliament constituency) =

Former European Parliament constituency

- European Parliament constituency
- Boundary within the West Midlands (1994-1999)
- Member state: United Kingdom
- Created: 1994
- Dissolved: 1999
- MEPs: 1

Prior to its uniform adoption of proportional representation in 1999, the United Kingdom used first-past-the-post for the European elections in England, Scotland and Wales. The European Parliament constituencies used under that system were smaller than the later regional constituencies and only had one Member of the European Parliament each.

The constituency of Worcestershire and South Warwickshire was one of them.

It consisted of the Westminster Parliament constituencies (on their 1983 boundaries) of Bromsgrove, Mid Worcestershire, Rugby and Kenilworth, South Worcestershire, Stratford-on-Avon, Warwick and Leamington, and Worcester.

== Members of the European Parliament ==
Election	Member	Party
1994	John Corrie	Conservative
1999	Constituency abolished: see West Midlands	

== Results ==
European Parliament election, 1994: Worcestershire and South Warwickshire
Party	Candidate	Votes	%	±%
Conservative	John Corrie	73,573	35.2	
Labour	Gisela Gschaider	72,369	34.6	
Liberal Democrats	Peter J. Larner	44,168	21.1	
Green	Janet A. Alty	9,273	4.4	
National Independence Party	Clifford Hards	8,447	4.0	
Natural Law	James L. Brewster	1,510	0.7	
Majority		1,204	0.6	
Turnout		209,340	38.0	
Conservative win (new seat)				
