= Philippa Whitford =

Scottish doctor and politician (born 1958)

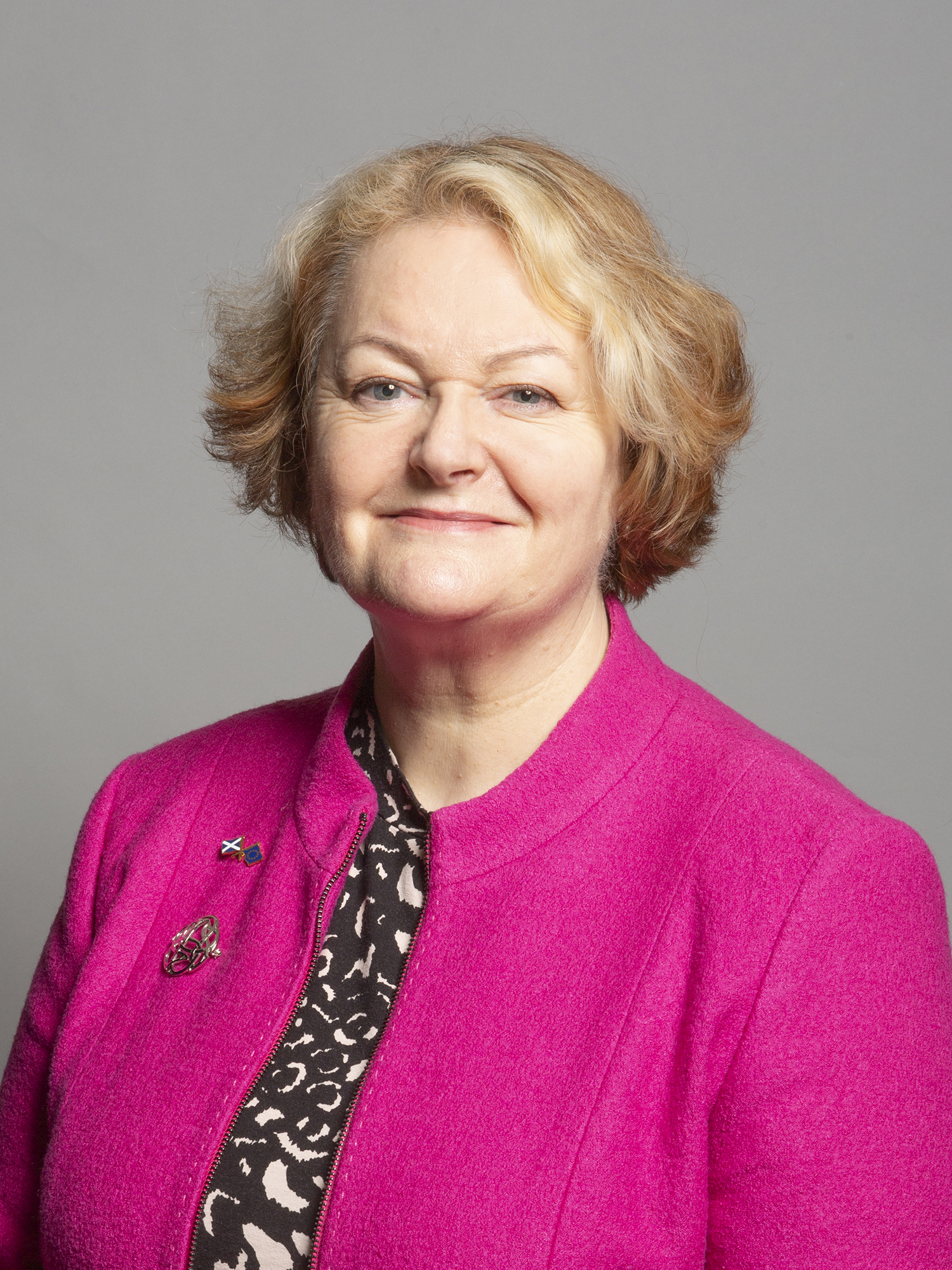

SNP Scotland Spokesperson in the House of Commons
- In office 10 December 2022 – 4 September 2023
- Leader: Stephen Flynn
- Preceded by: Mhairi Black
- Succeeded by: Tommy Sheppard

SNP Spokesperson for Europe in the House of Commons
- In office 7 January 2020 – 10 December 2022
- Leader: Ian Blackford
- Preceded by: Position established
- Succeeded by: Alyn Smith

SNP Spokesperson for Health and Social Care in the House of Commons
- In office 20 May 2015 – 14 December 2021
- Leader: Angus Robertson; Ian Blackford
- Preceded by: Position established
- Succeeded by: Martyn Day

SNP Spokesperson for Exiting the European Union in the House of Commons
- In office 7 January 2020 – 31 January 2020
- Leader: Ian Blackford
- Preceded by: Peter Grant
- Succeeded by: Position abolished

Member of Parliament for Central Ayrshire
- In office 7 May 2015 – 30 May 2024
- Preceded by: Brian Donohoe
- Succeeded by: Alan Gemmell

Personal details
- Born: 24 December 1958 (age 67) Belfast, Northern Ireland
- Party: Scottish National Party
- Spouse: Hans Pieper (m. 1987)
- Children: 1
- Education: University of Glasgow
- Website: whitford.scot

Philippa Whitford (born 24 December 1958) is a Scottish National Party (SNP) politician and a breast surgeon. Originally from Northern Ireland, she was first elected as the Member of Parliament (MP) for Central Ayrshire in May 2015 and was re-elected in 2017 and 2019. Whitford stood down at the 2024 general election. She previously served as the SNP Spokesperson for Scotland from December 2022 to September 2023.

She served as the SNP Health spokesperson in the House of Commons from 2015 to 2021.

== Early life and education ==
Whitford was born in Belfast, Northern Ireland to Elizabeth and Philip Whitford. The family moved to Scotland when she was aged ten. She was educated at St Angela's Providence Convent Secondary School in London and Douglas Academy in Milngavie, before studying at the University of Glasgow, where she graduated with medical degrees. She was the first woman in her family to gain admission to university.

== Career ==
=== Surgical career ===
Whitford worked as a consultant breast cancer surgeon at Crosshouse Hospital, Kilmarnock for 19 years.

Just after the First Gulf War and during the First Palestinian Intifada in her early thirties, Whitford served for a year and a half as a medical volunteer in a United Nations hospital in the Gaza Strip. She spent the 2016 parliamentary recess travelling to the West Bank to operate on four women suffering from breast cancer, and visited Gaza to advise local hospitals on how to improve healthcare and services to treat breast cancer.

=== Political career ===
Whitford joined the Scottish National Party in 2012. She became involved with the campaign preceding the 2014 Scottish independence referendum. She advocated independence as a way of protecting NHS Scotland from the same kind of "creeping privatisation agenda undermining services in England". An online video of her claiming the NHS in England would be privatised within five years and in Scotland within ten went viral at this time.

"In five years, England will not have an NHS and in 10 years, if we vote no, neither will we," she said.

=== House of Commons ===
Whitford was selected to contest Central Ayrshire for the SNP at the 2015 general election. She polled 26,999 votes – 53.2% of the vote – defeating the incumbent Labour MP, Brian Donohoe, by 13,589 votes. She made her maiden speech in the House of Commons on 2 June 2015.

She was a member of the Joint Committee on the Draft Domestic Abuse Bill, but left the committee on 11 March 2019 to be replaced by Liz Saville Roberts.

In August 2020 after the SNP's rules on candidate selection were changed, meaning MPs seeking election to Holyrood would have to resign their seat at Westminster, Whitford tweeted "For ALL [SNP] MPs – now trapped at Westminster with no straightforward way to put themselves forward for Scotland's own Parliament. No one ever mentioned this before any of us stood for Westminster." The tweet provoked an angry response from political opponents, with Labour's Monica Lennon responding that, "Representing your community is a privilege and responsibility like no other... If SNP MPs feel 'trapped' they should release themselves and let others serve."

In March 2021 Whitford compared Scotland's position as part of the United Kingdom to a woman "locked" in a room and who had had her cheque book "taken away". The remarks were condemned as "appalling" by Scottish Labour's Deputy leader Jackie Baillie who said: "There is a constant challenge to ensure that domestic abuse is taken seriously and for the gravity of such offences to be properly recognised, so no one, let alone an MP, should ever trivialise the matter by making such throw away comments which will have deeply offended people."

After Westminster blocked the Gender Recognition Reform (Scotland) Bill in January 2023, using section 35 for the first time since the Scotland Act 1998 was passed, Whitford remarked that its veto was an "unprecedented attack" on the Scottish Parliament which showed the "hollow reality" of devolution in the United Kingdom".

She announced in July 2023 that she would stand down at the 2024 general election.

== Personal life ==
Whitford has been married to Hans Pieper, a German citizen who works as a general practitioner, since 1987; the couple have a son together.

Parliament of the United Kingdom
Preceded by Brian Donohoe	Member of Parliament for Central Ayrshire; 2015–2024	Succeeded by Alan Gemmell
