= John Corrie =

Scottish Conservative politician

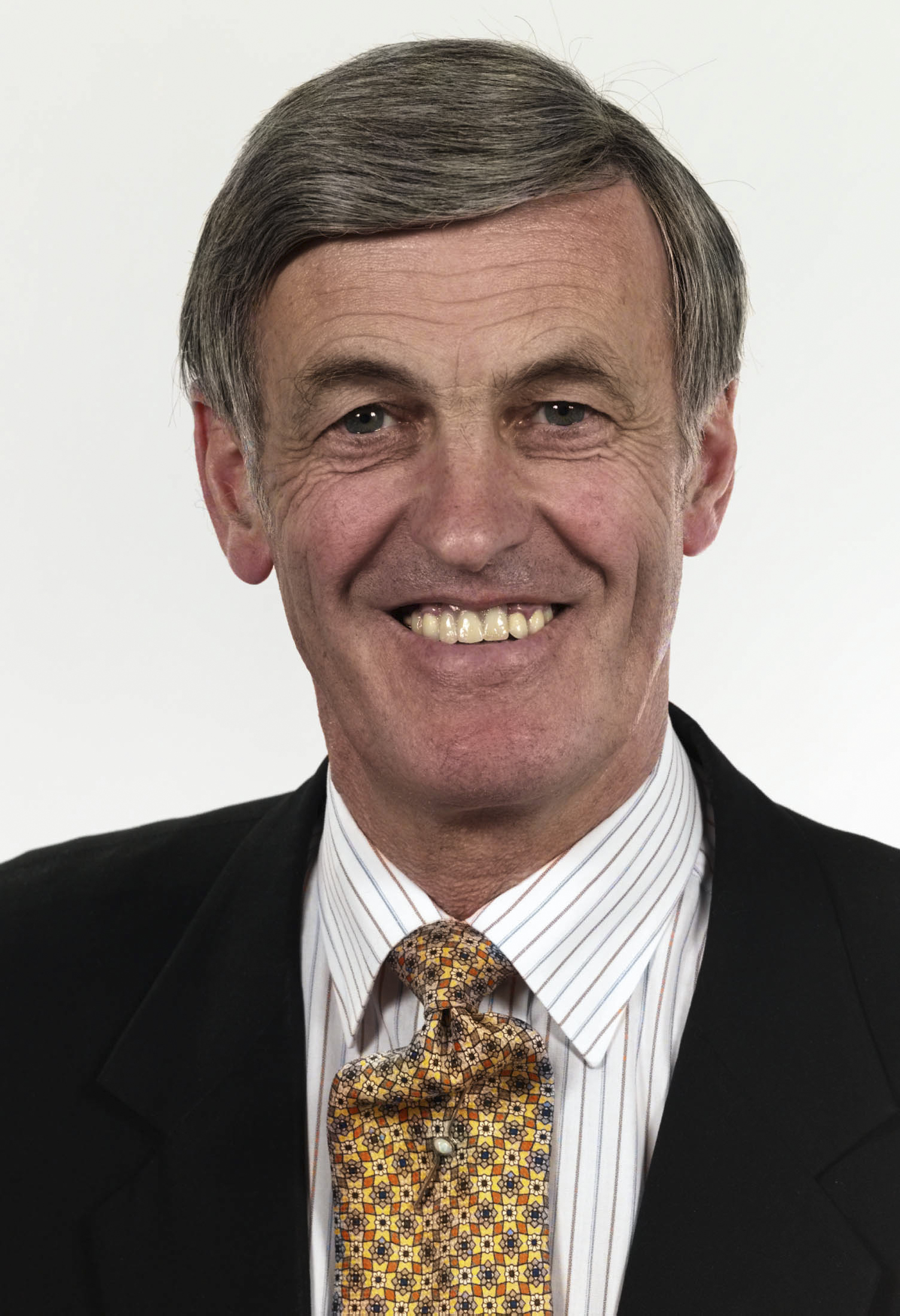
- Corrie in 1999

Member of the European Parliament for West Midlands Worcestershire and South Warwickshire (1994–1999)
- In office 9 June 1994 – 10 June 2004
- Preceded by: Constituency established
- Succeeded by: Mike Nattrass

Member of Parliament for Cunninghame North Bute and North Ayrshire (1974–1983)
- In office 28 February 1974 – 18 May 1987
- Preceded by: Sir Fitzroy Maclean
- Succeeded by: Brian Wilson

Personal details
- Born: 29 July 1935 (age 91) Scotland, United Kingdom
- Party: Conservative
- Other political affiliations: Unionist
- Education: Lincoln Agricultural College

John Alexander Corrie (born 29 July 1935) is a Scottish Conservative politician. He describes himself in Who's Who as a "consultant on African affairs and financial adviser to developing countries". He is now retired.

== Early life ==
Corrie was educated at Kirkcudbright Academy, George Watson's College, Edinburgh and Lincoln Agricultural College, New Zealand. He is a farmer, and was the Nuffield Scholar in agriculture from 1972 to 1973.

== Political career ==
Corrie was Chairman of the Young Unionists from 1963–64.

Corrie contested North Lanarkshire in 1964 and Central Ayrshire in 1966. He was Member of Parliament for Bute and North Ayrshire from February 1974 to 1983, and for Cunninghame North from 1983 until the 1987 general election, when he lost his seat to the Labour Party candidate Brian Wilson. Although he stood in 1992 for Argyll and Bute, he was defeated and did not return to the Commons.

Corrie was also a Member of the European Parliament (MEP) for three periods. He was an MEP twice in the period when it was indirectly elected, from 1975 to 1976 and from 1977 to 1979. He was later elected the MEP for Worcestershire and South Warwickshire and from 1994 to 1999, and then for the multi-seat West Midlands constituency from the 1999 election until the 2004 election. He was Co-President of the African, Caribbean, and Pacific Joint Parliamentary Assembly from 1999 to 2002, and is now Honorary Life President. Corrie is a member of the AWEPA Governing Council.

Parliament of the United Kingdom
Preceded by Sir Fitzroy Maclean	Member of Parliament for Bute and Northern Ayrshire; Feb 1974 – 1983	Constituency abolished
New constituency	Member of Parliament for Cunninghame North; 1983–1987	Succeeded by Brian Wilson
