= Aylmer Hunter-Weston =

British Army general

Lieutenant-General Sir Aylmer Hunter-Weston KCB DSO
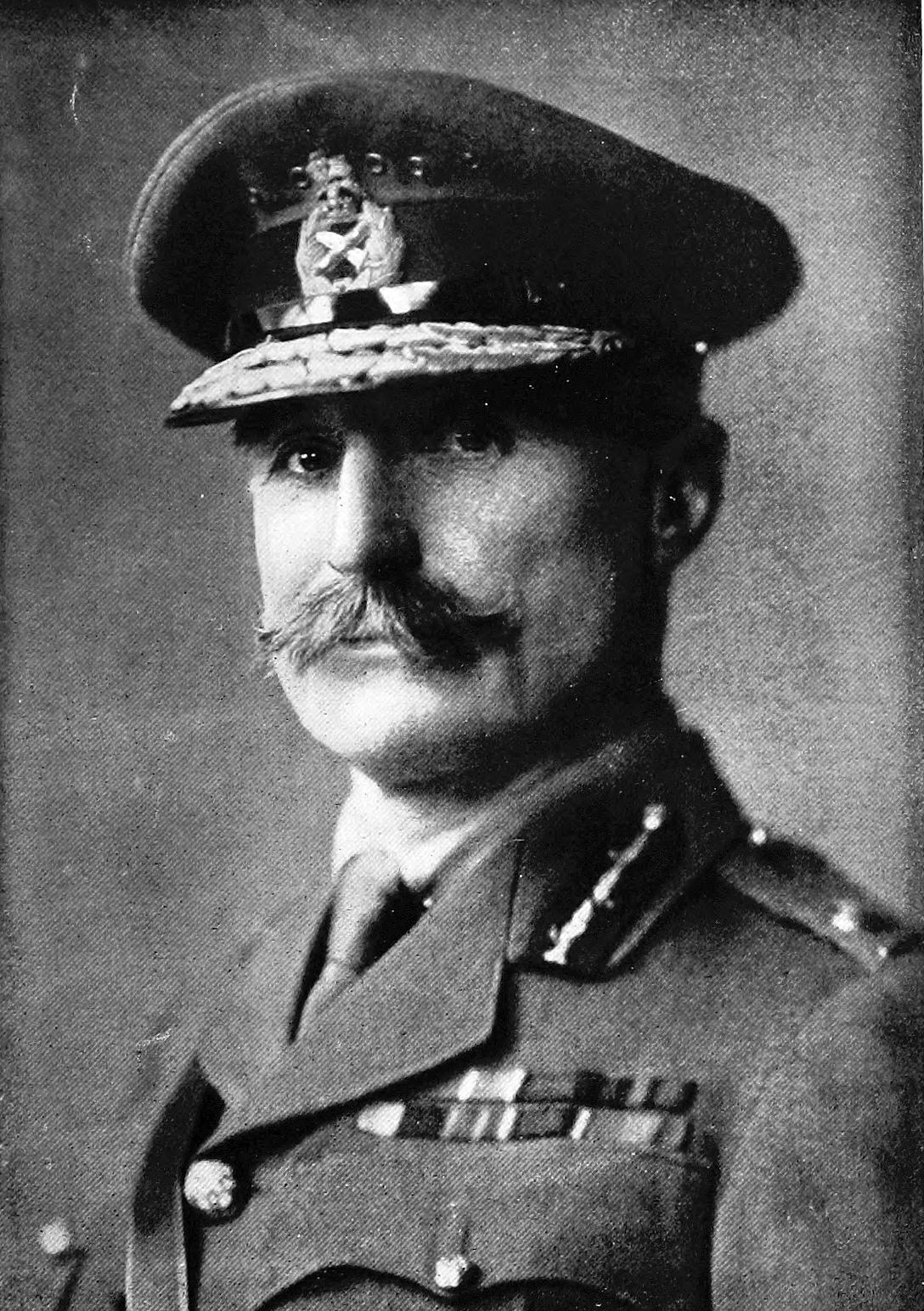
- Born: 23 September 1864; Hunterston, West Kilbride, Scotland
- Died: 18 March 1940 (aged 75)
- Military career
- Allegiance: United Kingdom
- Branch: British Army
- Service years: 1884–1919
- Rank: Lieutenant-General
- Nickname: "Hunter-Bunter"
- Units: Royal Engineers
- Commands: VIII Corps; 29th Division; 11th Infantry Brigade; 11th Field Company, Royal Engineers
- Conflicts: Second Boer War; First World War
- Awards: Knight Commander of the Order of the Bath; Distinguished Service Order; Venerable Order of Saint John; Mentioned in Despatches

Lieutenant-General Sir Aylmer Gould Hunter-Weston, KCB, DSO (23 September 1864 – 18 March 1940) was a British Army officer who served in the First World War on the Western Front, at Gallipoli in 1915, and in the very early stages of the Somme Offensive in 1916. He was also a Scottish Unionist MP.

Nicknamed "Hunter-Bunter", Hunter-Weston has been seen as a classic example of a "donkey" general; he was described by his superior, Field Marshal Sir Douglas Haig, as a "rank amateur", and has been referred to by one modern writer as "one of the Great War's spectacular incompetents". However, another historian writes that although his poor performance at Krithia earned his reputation "as one of the most brutal and incompetent commanders of the First World War" "in his later battles (at Gallipoli) he seemed to hit upon a formula for success ...(but) these small achievements were largely forgotten".

== Early life ==
Hunter-Weston was born at Hunterston, West Kilbride, on 23 September 1864, the son of Lieutenant Colonel John Gould Read Hunter-Weston (1823–1904) and his second wife, who was the daughter and heir of the 25th Laird of Hunterston. He was educated at Wellington College 1875–82 and Royal Military Academy at Woolwich in 1882, then was commissioned as a lieutenant into the Royal Engineers in February 1884.

== Early military career ==
He was promoted captain in May 1892. He served on the Indian North West Frontier and took part in the Miranzai Expedition of 1891 and was wounded during the Waziristan Expedition of 1894–95. He was promoted to brevet major in August 1895.

== Egypt and Boer War ==
He was on Major General Horatio Kitchener, 1st Earl Kitchener's staff on the Nile Expedition of 1896. He attended the Staff College, Camberley (where he was master of the Staff College hounds) 1898–99.

He later took part in the Second Boer War in South Africa between 1899 and 1902 as a staff officer, then as commander of the mounted engineers, then of the Royal Engineer Cavalry Division. He then became deputy assistant adjutant general (DAAG), then chief of staff, to Major General Sir John French's Cavalry Division, before going on to command a cavalry column. His mounted engineers cut Boer-controlled roads and railways, and cut the railway near Bloemfontein to prevent the Boers from reinforcing it. In 1900 he was promoted to brevet lieutenant-colonel and awarded the Distinguished Service Order (DSO). He was described as having "reckless courage combined with technical skill and great coolness in emergency", was mentioned in dispatches (including 31 March 1900) and received the Queen's South Africa Medal.

After returning to Britain, Hunter-Weston endured six months of convalescence before taking command of the 11th Field Company, Royal Engineers, then serving in Shorncliffe Camp, Kent. He then served on the Royal Engineers staff in London in late 1902, when he was appointed for duty at Shorncliffe Army Camp. He then succeeded Lieutenant Colonel Walter Doran as deputy assistant adjutant general of the IVth Army Corps in September 1904 before being made a general staff officer with Eastern Command (formerly the IVth Army Corps) from 1904 to 1908. He married Grace Strang-Steel in 1905. He was promoted to brevet colonel in November 1906, and to full colonel in June 1908, and served as a general staff officer, grade 1 (GSO1) with Scottish Command from then until 1911.

In 1911 he succeeded his mother as the 27th Laird of Hunterston and was made a Companion of the Order of the Bath (CB) in the 1911 Coronation Honours. He was assistant director of military training 1908–11 and his motto was "teach the trainers how to teach before they try to teach the Tommies".

In March 1911 he succeeded Colonel John Du Cane as a GSO1 at the War Office in London. He held this position until February 1914 when he was promoted to temporary brigadier general and made general officer commanding of the 11th Infantry Brigade at Colchester, taking over from Major General Henry Heath.

== First World War ==
A few weeks after the outbreak of the war in 1914, he led his brigade to France as part of 4th Division on the Western Front, including at the battles of Le Cateau and the Aisne, where he supervised his command from a motorbike (at a time when senior generals used cars and most other officers used horses). He "often appeared in the most surprising places" and his handling of the brigade was "skilful". His was the first British unit to cross the Aisne, on a damaged bridge. His bravery and determination marked him out for promotion. Hunter-Weston was one of the senior officers commanded to write regularly to the King to keep His Majesty informed of military developments. In October 1914, "for distinguished conduct in the Field", he was promoted to the rank of major-general.

== Gallipoli campaign ==
=== Planning ===
When the Gallipoli campaign commenced in March 1915, Hunter-Weston was promoted to the command of the 29th Division, which was to make the landing at Cape Helles near the entrance to the Dardanelles.

When asked for his advice before the landings, Hunter-Weston cautioned General Sir Ian Hamilton that the Turks had had ample time to turn the peninsula into "an entrenched camp", that Helles was less vulnerable to Turkish attack than Suvla Bay but conversely offered little room for manoeuvre and given Britain's lack of high explosive shells needed to cover attacks risked an Allied bridgehead being tied up in front of Kilitbahir Plateau and becoming "a second Crimea" which would damage Britain's standing with neutral Greece and Romania. He suggested that given the loss of surprise (because of the unsuccessful naval attack on 18 March) it might be better to call off the expedition.

Hunter-Weston wrote to his wife (7 April) "the odds against us are heavy. However, nothing is impossible". Major General William Birdwood also privately wrote the same, and Travers suggests that, as British officers of the era were expected to remain cheerful and optimistic in public, this may have been "a safety outlet" to be pointed to if the operation went wrong.

Hunter-Weston, supported by Admiral de Robeck, preferred a daylight landing at Helles (Hamilton and Birdwood preferred an attack just before first light – this was used for the ANZAC landing further north, which had been intended to land on the beach at Gaba Tepe).

=== Landings ===
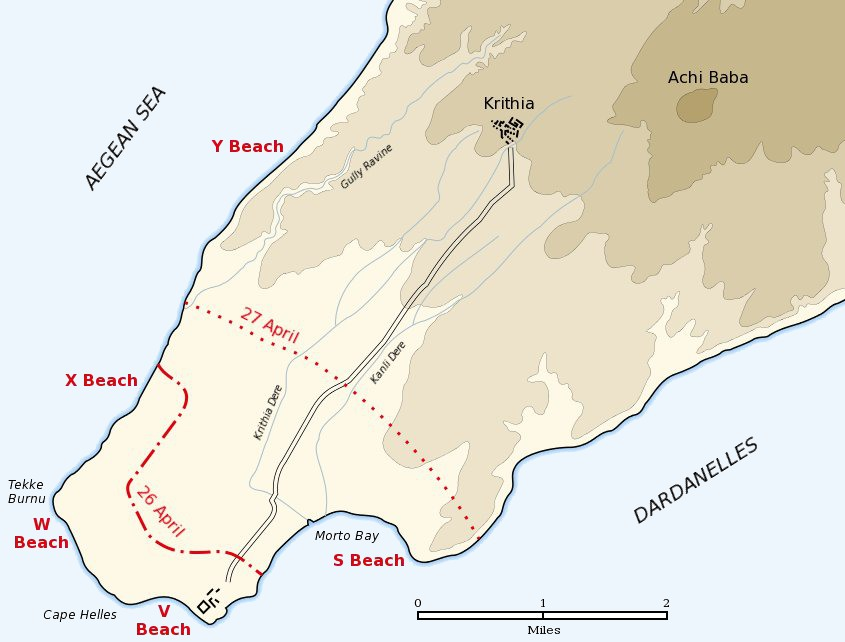
Cape Helles landing beaches

Hunter-Weston concentrated on V, W and X Beaches at the tip on the peninsula, less on S and Y beaches (on the right and left flanks respectively), which were intended merely to threaten the Turkish retreat. No contingency plan had been made for S or Y beach forces to push ahead if the main forces at V, W and X were held up. Admiral Wemyss and Hunter-Weston spent 25 April, the day of the landings, on board HMS Euryalus, the attendant ship at W beach, so were unable to inspect elsewhere – Hunter-Weston and his chief of staff Brigadier-General H. E. Street were on the bridge, where their papers were scattered every five minutes when the ship's 9.2-inch gun was fired. An angry Roger Keyes recorded that they "were in complete ignorance of what was going on anywhere except at W and possibly at X Beach" and was furious at Hamilton for adhering to Staff College doctrine by not interfering with "the man on the spot" (Hamilton claimed he was dissuaded by Braithwaite, even though he could see that V Beach was in trouble).

He diverted the Essex Regiment (part of 88th Brigade) from V to W Beach at 0830 hrs. Hunter-Weston's diary records that "V Beach is still hung up", suggesting that he thought the problems there temporary, although he was dissuaded from landing to take personal command at that beach.

For ten hours on 25 April Lt-Col Godfrey Matthews signalled to Hunter-Weston, demanding reinforcements of men and ammunition at Y Beach, but received no reply. Hunter-Weston did not reply to Hamilton's first offer (9.21am) to make more trawlers available to land more troops at Y Beach, where they had surprise and lack of opposition. After being ordered to reply to the second message (10:00 am) he only did so at 10.35 am after consulting Admiral Wemyss. He was still awaiting reports from V Beach at the time. At 6:00 pm Marshall, the commander at X Beach, asked permission to advance to assist Y Beach, but after a delay of two hours Hunter-Weston ordered him to stay put and advance the following day.

On the evening of 25 April Hunter-Weston boarded HMS Queen Elizabeth to confer with Hamilton, who recorded that he was "cheery, stout-hearted, quite a good tonic and – on the whole – his news is good". After 25 April landings Hunter-Weston thought the bravery of the men at W Beach "a most marvellous feat".

Hunter-Weston appears to have little interest in Y Beach during the night of 25–26 April. He did not mention Y Beach in his diary, and later concealed the evidence about it from Hamilton until July 1915. When the force at Y Beach had to be evacuated on the morning of 26 April – a decision taken at the local level – Hamilton assumed that Hunter-Weston had ordered this without consulting him.

Robin Prior writes that Hunter-Weston "remained anchored off W beach.. He was out of contact with S and Y, neglected X and seemed determined to avoid any knowledge of V... (he) took no steps to gather information for himself. His one positive move (to shift troops from V to W beach) had nothing to do with the situation at V and only succeeded because the Turkish defence was stretched too thinly." Gordon Corrigan claims – without giving further detail – that his command of the division was "one of the more competent aspects" of the Helles landings and that "his handling of the division, once ashore, was thoroughly competent".

=== First Krithia ===
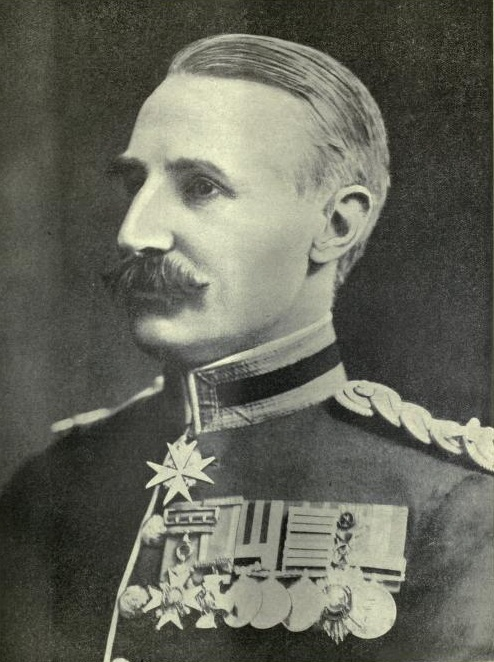
Sir Aylmer Hunter-Weston.

Because the French were taking time to get ashore, on 27 April Hunter-Weston postponed his advance until 4pm, with a view to taking the hill of Achi Baba the following day. The complex wheeling plan had neglected the effect of gullies and ravines on troop movements. Hunter-Weston, in response to a request for information at 3.30pm, reported that there was nothing to justify "alarmist" reports, but that his troops were exhausted, short of ammunition, had suffered too many casualties and were at risk from Turkish counter-attack. He declined Hamilton's request to attack that day.

Hunter-Weston wrote to his wife (27 April) "my men have effected the impossible … we have managed it, we have achieved the impossible!" Having believed that the landing had only a one in four chance of success, he now believed that getting ashore had solved half the problem, and that capturing the hill of Achi Baba would solve three-quarters, although he added that this would take some time. There was no time for conferences before the First Battle of Krithia, and the French commander, d'Amade, was confused as to what was expected of him.

Progress up from the bridgehead at Helles was severely hampered by lack of artillery: at First Krithia (28 April 1915) only 18 guns were available—a comparable division-sized assault on the Western Front at the time might have had 200—and there was a shortage of mules to pull them forward, and nobody was sure where the Turkish front line actually was.

The Turks attacked the French on the nights of 1–2 May and 3–4 May. On 2 May, seeking to exploit the repulse of a Turkish attack the previous night, he launched an attack across the line, despite his troops being tired and short of ammunition – the 86th Brigade, too tired even to attack, stayed completely stationary – Robin Prior writes "no ground was gained by this lamentable episode". Hunter-Weston lent the French, the morale of whose African troops was in difficulties, the Anson Battalion of the Royal Naval Division and some Worcesters. Milward, a British officer, wrote that Hunter-Weston was cheerful and firm with the French. By this time the 29th Division had suffered 4,500 casualties, leaving 6,000 effectives, although the French attacking on the right flank had suffered in similar proportion.

=== Second Krithia ===
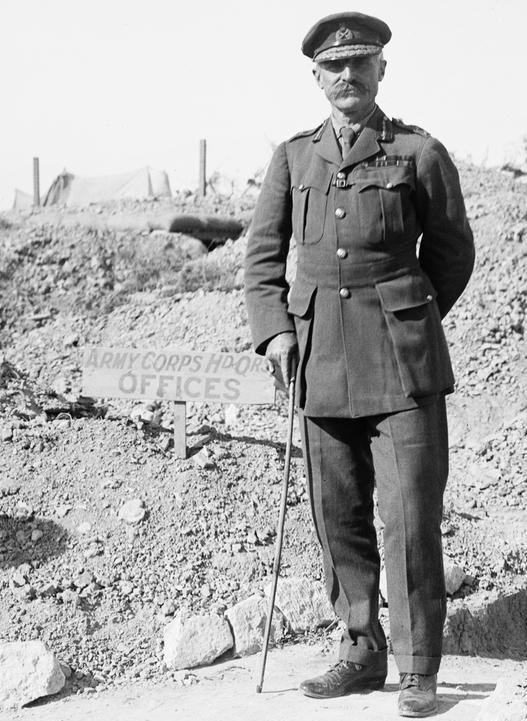
Lieutenant General Aylmer Hunter-Weston at the headquarters of British VIII Corps, Cape Helles, Gallipoli, 1915.

The Second Battle of Krithia (6–8 May 1915) was probably the last chance to break through at Helles. 105 guns were available, of which probably 75 were used but this was still far fewer than would have been used on the Western Front and there was still a lack of H.E. shells (many guns were 18-pounders firing only shrapnel), mules and knowledge of the Turkish positions, whilst Hunter-Weston's plans were excessively detailed and complex, full of map references and complex wheeling manoeuvres. Hunter-Weston had around 25,000 troops, few of them fresh. Intelligence estimated Turkish numbers at around 15,000–20,000 which was broadly accurate.

Hunter-Weston planned a three-pronged assault: 125th Brigade (territorials), part of the newly-arriving 42nd Division, on the left, a composite 88th Brigade in the centre, and the French on the right. Hamilton would have preferred an attack just before dawn, but Hunter-Weston, citing the loss of company officers, did not, and it is unclear that he was wrong. D'Amade agreed and Hamilton deferred to their Western front experience, which he lacked.

Hunter-Weston persisted in his attacks on 7 and 8 May. Hunter-Weston issued a warning order to brigadiers at 23.35 on 7 May, but formal orders were not issued on the morning of 8 May until two hours before the attack was due to begin, giving brigadiers little time to locate and confer with battalion commanders.

Colonel Wolley Dod, a staff officer of 29th Division, later called Krithia "a mad adventure without the necessary artillery support" and "had some difference of opinion with Hunter-Weston" about using the 125th Brigade again after their initial defeat. In a letter to his wife, Hunter-Weston noted of 125th Brigade that "it was blooded today. It did fairly well, and will do better still as it gets more experience" and that the rattle of musketry "lull(ed) him to sleep". He also informed his wife that Hamilton thought him a great commander, worth a brigade of troops, which he explained to her was 4,000 men (Hamilton indeed thought he had "truly great qualities as a commander" but also that he was tiresome, grasping and talkative). Hunter-Weston also wrote to the King's adviser Clive Wigram about how detachment was a necessary quality in a commander. On 15 May he commented that 29th Division, whose severe casualties he had just listed, were "glorious fellows".

Hunter-Weston (15 May) proposed to break the stalemate by landing six New Army divisions at Enos on the west coast of Thrace. Hunter-Weston was advising Hamilton that another attack could deliver Achi Baba, with no need to wait for 52nd Division, due on 7 June. Aubrey Herbert wrote in his private diary that Hunter-Weston was "more hated than most of the generals".

As the campaign proceeded and more reinforcements were dispatched to Helles, on 24 May he was promoted to temporary lieutenant-general and placed in command of VIII Corps (29th Division, the Royal Naval Division, 42nd Division and the 29th Indian Infantry Brigade).

=== Third Krithia ===
Hunter-Weston thought the sinking of the battleship HMS Majestic (27 May) "a marvellous sight" and later thought the sinking of a French transport "a wonderful sight".

After Second Krithia Hunter-Weston still believed that the capture of Achi Baba was a realistic aspiration, as did Henri Gouraud, who had replaced d'Amade in command of the French troops on 15 May. Hamilton, who would have preferred to wait for more troops and munitions, deferred to their judgement, and planning for Third Krithia began at a conference on 31 May.

Brigadier-General William Marshall recorded how Hunter-Weston insisted that the 127th Manchester Brigade sap forward during a full moon on the night of 2 June, despite his protests that they were advancing into a re-entrant. Visiting the troops afterwards to congratulate them, Hunter-Weston commented that it would have been worth doing even for 500 casualties (there had in fact been fifty).

At the Third Battle of Krithia (4 June), Hunter-Weston planned with more caution and realism, gaining better intelligence of Turkish positions (including aerial photography), ordering night digging to get the start-off point within 250 yards (230 m) of the Turkish positions (it had been 1,800 yards (1,600 m) the previous time) and ordering a lull in the bombardment in the hope that the Turkish guns might give away their positions by retaliating, thus enabling counter-battery fire.

A breakthrough towards Krithia was almost attained by the British infantry (88th brigade) in the centre – where the artillery fire had been concentrated – Hunter-Weston was concerned about an advance in the centre being trapped in a salient and so committed nine of his 18 reserve battalions (12 British, 6 French) not to the centre but to the unsuccessful attacks on the flanks (Indians on the left flank and the Royal Naval Division and the French on the right). This error of reinforcing failure rather than success made the battle, in Robin Prior's view, "not one of (his) finer moments". However, Steel & Hart to some extent defend this decision, taken after consultation with the French, on the grounds that he had very limited reserves and the weaker parts of the line had to be shored up (in the event the renewed attack was cancelled as the French were in no state to attack again). Afterwards he blamed wire, machine-gun fire and the French, lack of training stopping the Royal Naval Division holding onto captured trenches, and loss of officers.

He still thought that more men, guns and ammunition might enable him to win a "glorious victory" on 11 June, and after the event thought it had been "glorious in execution". Travers comments on Hunter-Weston's "mental and physical detachment" at this time, and on the romantic view of war and self-praise in his letters. Hunter-Weston's dugout, dug in June 1915 as protection from Turkish guns firing from near Troy (on the east bank of the Dardanelles) was called "Baronial Hall".

=== Improved artillery concentration ===
In Prior's view "there is strong evidence that (Hunter-Weston) took to heart the lessons" that concentrated High Explosive bombardment by heavy howitzers was needed for success and held meetings with the French General Gouraud at which they agreed to cooperate with their artillery and adopt this method. Progress was made in some attacks in late June and early July, with one French attack using a density of shelling up to 20 times that of the early attacks. In some cases these inflicted greater casualties on the Turkish defenders than the attackers, as lack of space, reserves and guns did not allow the Turks to adopt the defensive tactics used by the Germans later in the war: holding the front line thinly, counter-attacking and counter-battery fire on Allied artillery. Travers attributes "bite and hold" to Hamilton, who proposed it, on Birdwood's suggestion on 10 May.

Having been discovered by the Allies, these "bite and hold" tactics were then abandoned and their discovery in Gallipoli largely forgotten by historians. This may be because Hunter-Weston and Gouraud were both soon invalided out of the peninsula or because the Allies had never intended Gallipoli to be about trench warfare and so were not interested in learning tactical land warfare lessons from it or because the development of artillery tactics throughout the war was not a clear-cut process, as is shown by the fact that similar tactics almost worked at Neuve Chapelle in March 1915 but were then not used for over a year afterwards.

Kereves Spur and Gully Spur, which had held up the advance on 4 June, were taken on 21 June and 28 June by limited advances under heavy artillery fire, whilst Hunter-Weston and Gouraud agreed that an attack on Fir Tree Spur on 28 June had failed because of lack of artillery there. Even in this period, attacks did not always turn out as hoped: during the Battle of Gully Ravine in late June he attacked with the inexperienced Scottish 52nd (Lowland) Division – the attack succeeded on the left, where artillery fire was concentrated (as the Indians had been thrown back there earlier in June) but the attack was over too wide a distance and half the 156th Brigade, attacking on the right with insufficient artillery support became casualties, of which over a third were killed (this was the attack of which Hunter-Weston claimed he was "blooding the pups").

On 3 July 1915 John Churchill reported "The 29th Div is down to small numbers now … These continual frontal attacks are terrible, and I fear the generals will be called butchers by the troops. HW already has that name with the 29th."

=== Departure ===
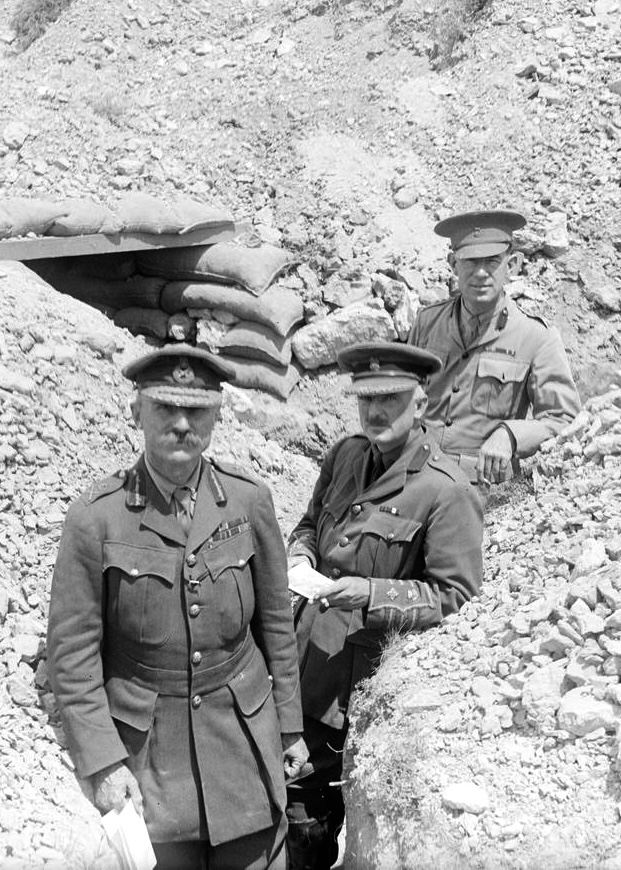
Major-General Aylmer Hunter-Weston, along with two members of his staff, in the trench leading to his dug-out, the entrance to which, protected by sand-bags, is seen in the background, July 1915.

The next attack was scheduled for 12 July as the superior French artillery would not be available until then. Hunter-Weston aimed to use the relatively fresh 52nd (Lowland) Division as his main offensive force, as the other three divisions of IX Corps were too worn out for much more than line-holding operations. Hamilton had wanted to deploy 52nd Division to ANZAC Cove, but concurred as he accepted that the Turks at Helles needed to be pressed after their losses on 5 July.

The attack was renewed on 12–13 July, with 155th and 157th brigades (both part of the 52nd Division) committed for the first time. Major General Granville Egerton, GOC 52nd Division, later (in 1929) wrote that Hunter-Weston "simply enunciated" his "positively wicked" plan, but that there was little discussion. Colonel McNeile of the 1/4th KOSBs appears to have had a heated discussion with Hunter-Weston over the objectives: he was subsequently killed in the attack. On 13 July, in an attempt to forestall a Turkish counterattack (there had been an incident of panic amongst the 1/7th Highland Light Infantry), Hunter-Weston ordered the Royal Marine Brigade to attack at 16.30. Owing to confusion, only two of the three battalions (Portsmouth, and Nelson but not Chatham) attacked, and incurred over 500 casualties advancing over open ground (although communication trenches had been dug) from the "original" British front line to a line already held by the 157th Brigade.

The journalist Ashmead-Bartlett wrote of how "a great number of the Brigadier-Generals openly refused to take any further orders from Hunter-Weston, who was responsible for the muddle … they all said that … he had been affected by the sun a little, and was incapable of giving orders". Hunter-Weston relieved Egerton of command of the 52nd Division on 13 July, sending him to his ship for a night's rest. Orlo Williams, a cipher officer, wrote in his diary (21 July) of how Hamilton, the nominal commander-in-chief of the campaign, had little direct involvement and how Hunter-Weston and a few staff officers were running the show.

Hunter-Weston was himself relieved on 23 July, officially for enteric or sunstroke, and returned to England. Les Carlyon wrote "What was wrong with (Hunter-Weston) has never become clear. The explanations run from sunstroke and exhaustion to enteric fever and dysentery to a collapse and a breakdown. Hamilton ... saw him 'staggering' off to a hospital ship." Hamilton recorded "He is suffering very much from his head". Next day he recorded "Hunter-Weston has to go home" and a few days later he referred to "Hunter-Weston's breakdown". Hamilton later wrote to Aspinall of the Dardanelles Commission (July 1916) that Lady Hunter-Weston had been told that her husband was being "sent home", normally a euphemism for sacking. Travers argues that his illness was used as an excuse to relieve him of command. He was knighted after being invalided home.

Godley wrote (23 July) "with all his faults Hunter-Weston was a gallant soul … At the same time, one is rather thankful to think he will not be (as he calls it) "blooding" Freddie Stopford's reinforcements (IX Corps) against Achi Baba". Political leaders in London had agreed to commit a further five divisions to Gallipoli in July, but had decided instead that further attacks from the Helles bridgehead were too slow and costly and that a fresh landing at Suvla Bay offered a better chance of swift victory. Hunter-Weston wrote to Hamilton (11 August – after criticism had been made of Stopford's lack of initiative at Suvla) urging that he appoint commanders who would "push unrelentingly, push without ceasing, push without mercy", without regard to the "yelping" of subordinate commanders.

== Seaborne Landing on Belgian Coast ==
At a meeting at Dover, Hunter-Weston was asked to lend his experience to discussions with Admiral Bacon, commander of the Dover Patrol, about Operation Hush a planned amphibious assault on the Belgian Coast (Haig diary 25 February 1916). After Haig had to abandon his plans for a Flanders Offensive in 1916, this landing was eventually scheduled to take place in the late summer or early autumn of 1917, to coincide with the Third Ypres Offensive, but in the end never took place.

== The Somme ==
=== Planning ===
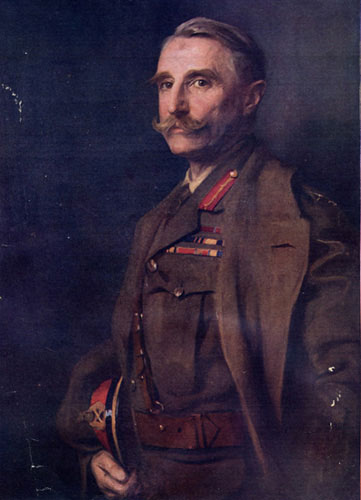
Portrait by Philip de László, 1916

In March 1916 Hunter-Weston was again promoted to acting lieutenant-general and again placed in command of VIII Corps, which was re-established in France; he commanded it in the early months of the Somme Offensive. At a Fourth Army Conference 30 March 1916 Hunter-Weston told Rawlinson that he was "strongly opposed to a wild rush … for an objective 4,000 yards away" and that "to lose the substance by grasping at the shadow is a mistake that has been made too often in this war". Haig—who had recently rejected Rawlinson's initial proposal to concentrate on capturing the German First Line on the first day of the offensive, before bringing guns forward and attacking the Second Line several days later—was critical that Hunter-Weston "was only going to take the enemy first system to begin with, and proceed slowly stage by stage" which would give the Germans a chance to bring up reserves, like the French at Verdun (Haig Diary 7 and 8 April 1916) He urged Hunter-Weston that his men should push on as far as possible without consolidating, as far as artillery cover allowed (Haig Diary 10 May 1916).

VIII Corps consisted (from north to south) of 31st, 4th and 29th Divisions. The German front line was overlooked by their second line, and by the fortified villages of Serre and Beaucourt.

VIII Corps "were saturated with optimism over-emphasising the effect of the preliminary bombardment". Hunter-Weston "was extremely optimistic, telling everybody that the wire had been blown away" although "they could see it standing strong and well" and that the enemy front line "would be blown to pieces" and that the attackers would "walk into Serre" (testimony of various officers to Edmonds, 1929).

VIII Corps took an exceptionally prescriptive approach to planning the Somme attack. Conferences were held on 21 and 23 June for brigadiers to share ideas. A 70-page report was issued, whose 28 headings included orders for the formation to be adopted down to company level for the advance on the second and third objectives, details and map references for strong points to be constructed, artillery plans, water supply plans and plans for the handling of prisoners. A section entitled "all units must push on resolutely" was followed by detailed plans for the digging of burial pits. Andy Simpson comments that the plan "seems to have been constructed on the basis that nothing could or would go wrong". Hunter-Weston wrote to his wife that he and his "excellent staff (had) done all possible to ensure success … I have nothing more to do now but to rest until well after the attack has taken place".

Brigadier-General Hubert Rees, commander of 94th Brigade (part of the raw 31st Division) which was to attack at Serre, thought Hunter-Weston's plan "a terrible document" of 76 pages, to which division HQ added a further 365 pages of supplementary instructions. Rees spent three days condensing this to a summary of eight pages and five maps, before having "a severe argument" with Hunter-Weston to have the plan amended to allow his brigade an extra ten minutes to take an orchard just east of Serre.

=== Patrols ===
Prior to the main attack VIII Corps was the only corps of Fourth Army to produce far more negative than positive reports from patrols. Ten raids were conducted, and it was reported that the German wire was intact on 31 Division sector, well cut on 4th Division sector, and variably cut on 29 Division sector. Rawlinson was particularly concerned with the situation, to the point of discussing it with Haig (Haig Diary 28 June 1916).

Haig claimed (Diary 28 June) that VIII Corps had not carried out any successful raids, apparently forgetting 29th Division's raid on the night of 4/5 June, which had discovered the existence of deep enemy dugouts. Two days before the offensive began Haig had little confidence in VIII Corps trench raiding or counter-battery fire, and after talking to a VIII Corps artillery officer thought they were "amateurs in hard fighting" who thought they knew it all because of Gallipoli, unlike those who had learned from "adversity, shortage of ammunition, and fighting under difficulties against a superior European enemy". One patrol—by a unit of Royal Dublin Fusiliers from 29th Division—managed to fight its way through the wire, and observed (report of 29 June) that the German front trench had been destroyed by the bombardment, but could not reach even that far as the area was swept by fire from the German second position. On the eve of battle Rawlinson noted (Rawlinson Diary 30 June) that "VIII Corps front … is somewhat behind-hand" at wire-cutting.

Rawlinson also noted that counter-battery fire had not worked well on VIII Corps sector, although in fact, largely owing to shortage of artillery, the problem was more widespread across other sectors than Rawlinson realised.

=== 1 July 1916 ===
Across the entire British front, 19 mines had been dug by Royal Engineer tunnelling companies to weaken enemy defences. The northernmost mine of 40,000 pounds (18,000 kg) of explosives was under the Hawthorn Ridge Redoubt, a front-line fortification west of the village of Beaumont Hamel in the VIII Corps sector. Hunter-Weston wished to detonate the mine four hours early, but this was vetoed by the Inspector of Mines at BEF GHQ, who pointed out that the British had a poor record of seizing craters before the Germans got there. As a compromise Hunter-Weston was allowed to detonate at 07:20. The explosion was filmed by British cinematographer Geoffrey Malins, who was recording the 29th Division attack. The other mines were detonated at 7:28 am, two minutes before Zero hour when the infantry advance would begin. In many cases, including Hawthorne Ridge, the Germans were able to seize the craters before the British troops crossed No Man's Land.

The Hawthorne Crater was to be seized by two companies. Artillery fire was lifted ten minutes before zero hour so as not to hit them, and field artillery two minutes before. In a blunder this was applied across the whole of VIII Corps sector, allowing the Germans ample time to man their parapets. Gallipoli veteran Major J.H.Gibbon of 460th Battery wrote to Hunter-Weston to protest that this was unwise, but received no reply.

On 1 July 1916 it was Hunter-Weston's divisions, attacking in the northern sector between the Ancre and the Serre, that suffered the worst casualties and failed to capture any of their objectives. Artillery fire was weaker here and the Germans had the advantage of high ground, whereas in the southern sector the opposite was true, but the decision had been made by senior generals (Haig and Rawlinson) to launch the attack over a wide front. His corps suffered 14,581 casualties on the first day, "or around 50 per cent of its strength, a figure greater than any other corps in the Fourth Army". Only a few small sections of enemy line were gained, and these had to be abandoned within a day or two. Of the three corps which tried a creeping barrage on the day of the attack, only VIII Corps was completely unsuccessful.

=== Under Gough ===
Haig commented in his diary (1 July) that given their lack of progress VIII Corps men could not have left their trenches, and placed VIII and X Corps under Gough's command, commenting that "The VIII Corps seems to need looking after!" Reports of the slaughter in that sector had not yet reached him. After 1 July it was impossible to renew the attack in this sector as the trenches were clogged with dead and dying men. Andy Simpson compares Hunter-Weston's command style at this time to that of "a sleepwalker". Hunter-Weston's own writings show that he regarded this as the modern managerial approach to fighting larger battles, and Simpson also points out that in practice he did direct his divisions actively on 1 July and he was "very busy" on 2 and 3 July as he tried to salvage the disaster which had befallen his corps.

After the event, Hunter-Weston (to the Chief of the Imperial General Staff, Robertson, 2 July) blamed the failure on the ineffective artillery bombardment, including lack of howitzer shells. Much later (in 1929) he blamed the premature detonation of the mine and claimed that failure had been inevitable and foreseen at the time because of the poor artillery preparation. However, at the time he had refused to alter the artillery scheme. Replying to Robertson's inquiries, Hunter Weston wrote (2 July) "It is inadvisable to give currency to such unpleasant and dangerous facts". In the following weeks he visited every battalion that had attacked, thanking the soldiers and telling them that they had made a necessary sacrifice so that advances could be made elsewhere on the front. On one of these occasions he narrowly escaped death from a German shell.

With the BEF having recently expanded tenfold in size, able officers were in short supply and were often poached by units higher up the chain of command. Hunter-Weston's senior artillery officer Brig-Gen Tancred was removed to Reserve Army while Hunter-Weston was away visiting his dentist in Boulogne (Gough was keen to centralise control of artillery at army rather than corps level). A letter to his wife (3 August 1916) expresses his dissatisfaction at staffwork in Gough's Reserve Army and his gladness that VIII Corps was moving to the Ypres Salient. Hunter-Weston protested that he had not been "Stellenbosched" (a Boer War term for moving generals to unimportant duties back at the base). He may well have been saved from the sack because, owing to the shortage of competent senior generals, British corps commanders were seldom sacked at this stage of the war.

== 1917 ==
In an October 1916 by-election, he was elected to the House of Commons as the Unionist member for North Ayrshire, defeating a pro-peace clergyman, Reverend Chelmers, by 7,419 votes to 1,300. Hunter-Weston, who was the first Member of Parliament to simultaneously command an army corps on the field, continued to command VIII Corps but was not involved in another offensive. He had the permission of General Sir Herbert Plumer, commander of the Second Army, to attend the Irish Home Rule debate in March 1917.

At the Battle of Messines (in which VIII Corps did not directly participate), he suggested that he launch a feint attack on his front five minutes before the main attack. This was vetoed by Plumer. Hunter-Weston's VIII Corps was moved again, this time out of the Ypres salient, as he had not been selected to command in the upcoming Third Ypres offensive. He handed over his sector to Maxse, GOC XVIII Corps, Cavan, GOC XIV Corps, Watts, GOC XIX Corps, and Jacob, GOC II Corps, in May 1917 (three corps—Jacob took over only a small part of VIII Corps sector—replacing one, due to the greater density of troops needed for a major offensive). VIII Corps returned to the Ypres Salient after the main offensive ended and took part in a local operation on the night of 2/3 December. Hunter-Weston was deeply concerned at the problem of defending the ground which had been gained and wrote claiming that he would resign for the good of the Empire if Haig attempted to renew the offensive (7 December 1917).

Hunter-Weston unjustifiably (in Simon Robbins' view) sacked two divisional commanders, Philip Wood (33rd Division, in November 1917) and P. S. Wilkinson (50th Division, in February 1918) for lack of aggression. Hunter-Weston spoke to subordinate generals "as if he was teaching a class of NCOs" (according to Major-General Sir Reginald Pinney, 24 December 1917).

== 1918 ==
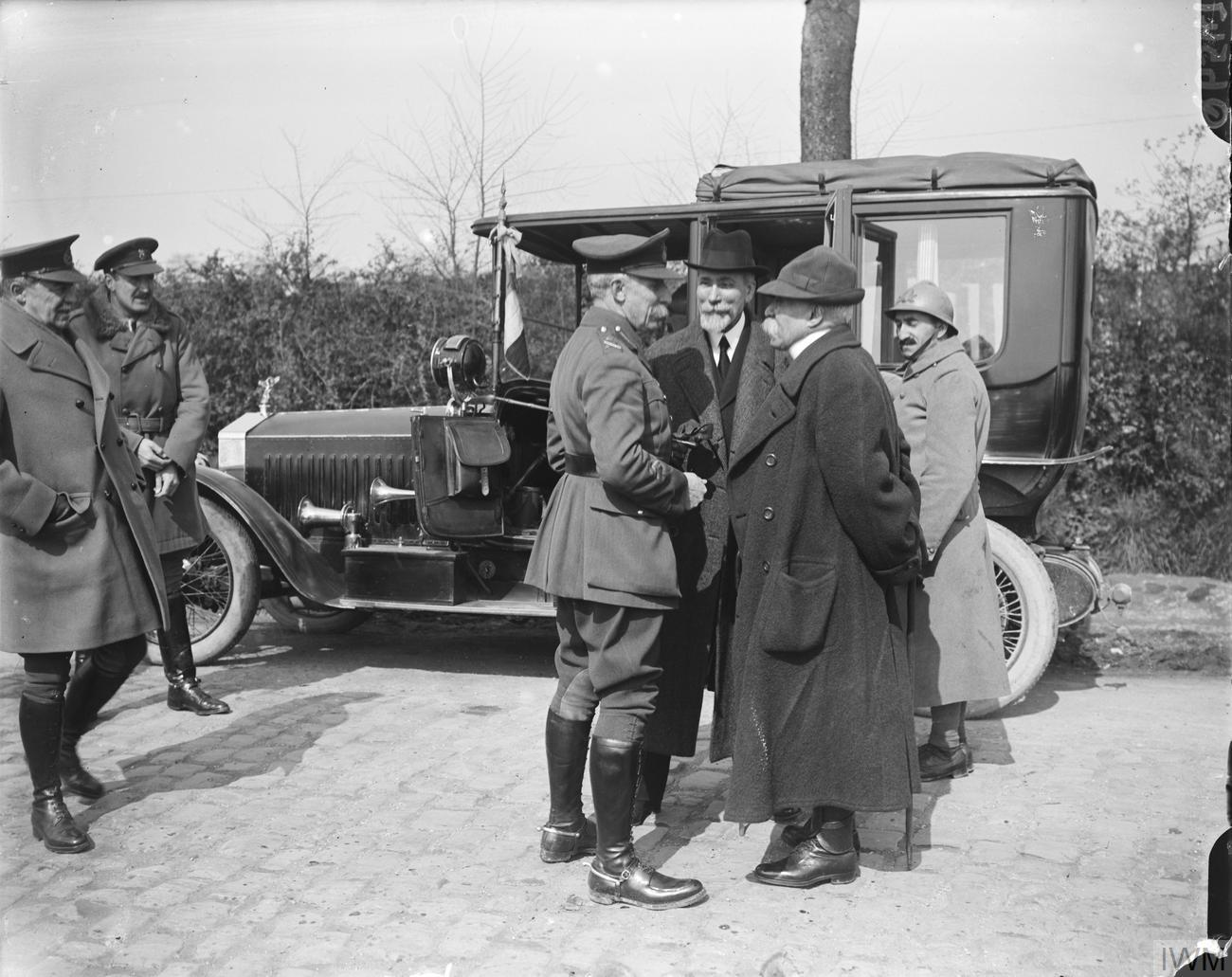
Lieutenant-General Aylmer Hunter-Weston, commanding VIII Corps, in conversation with Georges Clemenceau, the French Prime Minister, at Cassel, France, 21 April 1918.

After three weeks' home leave for preparation, he delivered his House of Commons maiden speech on the Manpower Bill on 24 January 1918 (at a time of much dispute over the manpower requirements of the army relative to agriculture, munitions, shipbuilding and ship-crewing and open warfare in the press between allies of the Prime Minister and of the CIGS William Robertson over the deployment of troops between fronts). It was praised by his army commander, and the Daily Sketch described it as the "Greatest Speech of the War". Hunter-Weston warned Haig (Haig Diary 25 February 1918) that some of his men had asked some visiting MPs if they were "Labour MPs" and had complained to them about the horrors of war and asked what they were fighting for.

In May 1918, during the reshuffling of Allied units, now under the Supreme Command of General Ferdinand Foch, to meet the German spring offensives, VIII Corps was at one point on the verge of being sent to join French Fourth Army. Hunter-Weston held a horseshow in August 1918, whilst the Battle of Amiens was in progress. Although he has been ridiculed for this, it has also been pointed out that VIII Corps was not involved in fighting at the time and that such events boosted morale and encouraged care of horses, which were still extensively used for transport and hauling equipment. He played an active role leading his corps in the Hundred Days Offensive, revisiting the battlefield of Le Cateau (11 October) and recollecting his successful handling of his brigade there.

== Command style ==
Hunter-Weston was a regular inspector of trenches and machine gun positions. He reconnoitred positions personally and on one occasion (1 November 1918) climbed into a fort on a rope ladder. Aged in his early fifties, he took great pride in his physical fitness and was proud of reducing more junior officers, including on one occasion a battalion commander in his mid-thirties, to breathlessness whilst out walking. In his autobiography Bonham-Carter recorded that Hunter-Weston devoted too much time to minor details which should have been left to junior staff officers. He thought him "a mountebank" and self-important, with the brain of an inexperienced boy and with a penchant for heroics. He was also notorious for his interest in inspecting latrines.

Hunter-Weston seems to have been regarded by his superiors as a "safe pair of hands" for receiving visiting dignitaries. He frequently visited Belgian divisional and corps HQ, as well as, on occasion, Belgian GCQ, the Belgian Prime Minister, and once took the King of the Belgians on a tour of the British lines. He received the Apostolic Delegate and Doyen of Ypres to dinner. He laid on a lavish lunch for the Portuguese President Machado in October 1917, taking his party on a tour of the Messines battlefield, where the ground had been carefully seeded with interesting souvenirs for them to "find". He had French President Poincaré to lunch twice and in late 1918 accompanied him on a visit to recently liberated towns and villages. At other times he received the Siamese, Italian and Romanian military attaches. He also used to take visiting British politicians to a vantage point on Hill 63 to see the Ypres Battlefield.

== Post-military life ==
Hunter-Weston married Grace Strang Steel on 5 December 1905 at Selkirk; they had no children.

Hunter-Weston continued in politics after the war, being elected again for Bute and Northern Ayrshire in 1918. He resigned from the army in 1919. He was promoted to permanent lieutenant-general in January 1919.

After the war his Who's Who entry filled an entire column. He retired from parliament in 1935 and died, aged seventy-five, on 18 March 1940 following a fall from a turret at his ancestral home in Hunterston; he was survived by his wife. His wealth at death was £41,658 11s (around £2m at 2016 prices) as of 23 August 1940.

His diaries, typed up and accompanied by letters and newspaper cuttings, were deposited in the British Museum after his death. Andy Simpson writes of these documents that "self-congratulation was one of his favourite activities".

== Assessments ==
Hunter-Weston acquired a reputation as an eccentric man, prone to laughter.

Hamilton called him "an acute theorist". Compton Mackenzie, author of Gallipoli Memories, comments on the way in which he was regarded as a "butcher" but wrote that "Actually no man I have met brimmed over more richly with human sympathy. He was a logican (sic) of war and as a logican he believed and was always ready to contend in open debate that, provided the objective was gained, casualties were of no importance".

W. B. Wood, one of the Official History writing team, wrote (in 1944) "my own blood had boiled as I read of the … results of Hunter-Weston's pig-headed tactics at Gallipoli".

Les Carlyon comments that he "threw away men the way other men tossed away socks" and writes "One cannot condemn (him) for failing to understand the new warfare of the twentieth century; few generals did in 1915. One can, however, condemn (him) for faults that are timeless. (He was) careless and arrogant and not very good".

Travers comments that VIII Corps staff work was poor, Hunter-Weston had too much freedom at Krithia and attacks became "ritualistic". He comments on his time as a Western Front commander that he was "an officer of intelligence, but lacking mental balance, given to extravagant and flamboyant gestures, and far too interested in irrelevant detail".

Gordon Corrigan claims that Hunter-Weston's performance at Gallipoli was "competent" but that he is unfairly vilified for his premature blowing of the Hawthorn Ridge Redoubt on 1 July 1916.

== See also ==
- Landing at Cape Helles
- Battle of Gallipoli
- First Battle of Krithia
- Second Battle of Krithia
- Third Battle of Krithia
- Hawthorn Ridge Redoubt
- First day on the Somme

== Footnotes ==
Military offices
Preceded by Frederick Shaw	GOC 29th Division; March–May 1915	Succeeded by Beauvoir De Lisle
Parliament of the United Kingdom
Preceded by Duncan Frederick Campbell	Member of Parliament for North Ayrshire; 1916–1918	Constituency abolished
New constituency	Member of Parliament for Bute and Northern Ayrshire; 1918–1935	Succeeded by Charles Glen MacAndrew
