= 1916 North Ayrshire by-election =

UK Parliamentary by-election

The 1916 North Ayrshire by-election was held on 11 October 1916. The by-election was held due to the death of the incumbent Conservative MP, Duncan Campbell, who died from wounds sustained in the First World War. It was won by the Conservative candidate Aylmer Hunter-Weston.

1916 North Ayrshire by-election
Party	Candidate	Votes	%	±%
Unionist	Aylmer Hunter-Weston	7,149	84.6	+35.7
Peace by Negotiation	Humphrey Chalmers*	1,300	15.4	New
Majority		5,849	69.2	N/A
Turnout		8,449	48.6	−36.7
Registered electors		17,385		
Unionist gain from Liberal		Swing		

*Chalmers was supported by the Union of Democratic Control and contested the 1918 general election as a Labour Party candidate.
