= David Lambie =

Scottish politician (1925–2019)

David Lambie (13 July 1925 – 15 December 2019) was a Scottish Labour Party politician.

Lambie was educated at Ardrossan Academy and at the University of Glasgow and Geneva University. He became a teacher and was chairman of the Scottish Labour Party from 1965 to 1966.

Lambie contested North Ayrshire and Bute in 1955, 1959, 1964 and 1966. He was Member of Parliament for Central Ayrshire from 1970 until 1983, and after the boundary changes of that year, for Cunninghame South from 1983 until his retirement in 1992.

On 13 July 2015 Lambie celebrated his 90th birthday.

== In popular culture ==
Lambie was portrayed by Renny Krupinski in the 2002 BBC production of Ian Curteis's controversial The Falklands Play.

Parliament of the United Kingdom
Preceded by Archie Manuel	Member of Parliament for Central Ayrshire; 1970–1983	Constituency abolished
New constituency	Member of Parliament for Cunninghame South; 1983–1992	Succeeded by Brian Donohoe
