= Brian Donohoe =

Former Scottish Labour politician (born 1948)

Sir Brian Donohoe
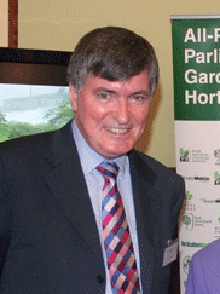
- Donohoe in 2012

Member of Parliament for Central Ayrshire Cunninghame South (1992–2005)
- In office 9 April 1992 – 30 March 2015
- Preceded by: David Lambie
- Succeeded by: Philippa Whitford

Personal details
- Born: 10 September 1948 (age 77) Kilmarnock, Ayrshire, Scotland
- Party: Labour
- Spouse: Christine Pawson

Sir Brian Harold Donohoe (born 10 September 1948) is a former British Labour Party politician and former trade union official, who was the Member of Parliament (MP) for Central Ayrshire from 2005 until losing his seat in 2015. Prior to constituency boundary changes in 2005, he was MP for Cunninghame South and was first elected in 1992.

== Early life ==
Born in Kilmarnock, he was educated at primary schools before attending Irvine Royal Academy. He later attended Kilmarnock Technical College, where he received a national certificate in Engineering in 1972.

He was an apprentice fitter and turner at the Ailsa Shipyard in Troon from 1965, before becoming a draughtsman in 1969. In 1977, he spent a few months as an engineer at the Hunterston nuclear power plant, before joining ICI Organics Division as a draughtsman later in the year.

In 1981, Donohoe became a district officer for the National Association of Local Government Officers (NALGO), where he remained until his election to Westminster.

An active trade unionist, he was a convenor for the Technical, Administrative and Supervisory Section (TASS) 1969–81. He was elected as the treasurer of the Cunninghame South Constituency Labour Party for eight years in 1983.

== Parliamentary career ==
Donohoe was elected to the House of Commons at the 1992 general election for the Cunninghame South constituency after the retirement of the previous Labour MP David Lambie. Donohoe held the seat with a majority of 10,680 votes, and continued as the MP until 2015, when he was defeated at the general election by Philippa Whitford of the Scottish National Party by 13,589 votes. He made his maiden speech in the House of Commons on 13 May 1992. In parliament he served as a member of the Transport Select committee, in its various forms, from 1993 until 2005. He was a member of the Administration Select Committee from the 2005 general election.

In November 2008, Donohoe was one of eighteen MPs who signed a Commons motion backing a Team GB football team at the 2012 London Olympic Games, saying football "should not be any different from other competing sports and our young talent should be allowed to show their skills on the world stage". The football governing bodies of Scotland, Wales and Northern Ireland are all opposed to a Great Britain team, fearing it would stop them competing as individual nations in future tournaments.

In February 2013, Cooper voted against the second reading of the Marriage (Same Sex Couples) Act 2013. Subsequently, in May 2013 the MP voted against the bill’s third and final reading, opposing the legalisation of same-sex marriage within England and Wales.

Donohoe's seat of Cunninghame South was abolished, and between 2005 and 2015 he represented the redrawn seat of Ayrshire Central.

In the 2015 United Kingdom general election Donohoe lost his Central Ayrshire seat to Philippa Whitford of the SNP by a margin of 13,589 votes. After his defeat, Donohoe said that he was "disappointed" to lose but that there was a silver lining: "I'm of an age where I can now turn round with the greatest delight and tell people to "fuck off!" which I haven't been able to do for a hell of a long time in both my trade union life and also in this one. You have to take all sorts coming through the door and be kind, considerate and generous with your time and sometimes you wonder why. But at the end of it you're there and I've always made the pledge as an MP that I wasn't just there to represent the people who voted for me, I was there to help."

After the Chilcot Report investigating the Iraq War was released, Donohoe stated he was "not convinced" it gave any fresh insight into the controversial decision to invade Iraq. Donohoe had voted for the invasion, but a year later he said he would have voted against had he known Iraq did not have weapons of mass destruction.

Donohoe was knighted in the 2019 Birthday Honours.

== Personal life ==
He married Christine Pawson in 1973 and they have two sons. He takes a particular interest in renationalising the British railway system. Donohoe is a serving Special Constable with the British Transport Police.

== Footnotes ==
Parliament of the United Kingdom
Preceded by David Lambie	Member of Parliament for Cunninghame South; 1992–2005	Constituency abolished
New constituency	Member of Parliament for Central Ayrshire; 2005–2015	Succeeded by Philippa Whitford
