= Brian Wilson (Labour politician) =

Scottish politician (born 1948)

The Right Honourable Brian Wilson CBE
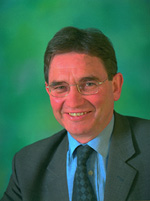
- Official portrait, c. 2001

Minister of State for Industry and Energy
- In office 11 June 2001 – 13 June 2003
- Prime Minister: Tony Blair
- Preceded by: Peter Hain
- Succeeded by: Jacqui Smith

Minister of State for Africa
- In office 24 January 2001 – 11 June 2001
- Prime Minister: Tony Blair
- Preceded by: Peter Hain
- Succeeded by: The Lord Malloch-Brown (2007)

Minister of State for Scotland
- In office 29 July 1999 – 24 January 2001
- Prime Minister: Tony Blair
- Preceded by: Helen Liddell
- Succeeded by: George Foulkes
- In office 5 May 1997 – 28 July 1998
- Prime Minister: Tony Blair
- Preceded by: James Douglas-Hamilton
- Succeeded by: Helen Liddell

Minister of State for Trade
- In office 28 July 1998 – 28 July 1999
- Prime Minister: Tony Blair
- Preceded by: The Lord Clinton-Davis
- Succeeded by: Richard Caborn

Member of Parliament for Cunninghame North
- In office 12 June 1987 – 11 April 2005
- Preceded by: John Corrie
- Succeeded by: Katy Clark (North Ayrshire & Arran)

Personal details
- Born: Brian David Henderson Wilson; 13 December 1948 (age 77) Dunoon, Scotland
- Party: Labour
- Education: University of Dundee, Cardiff University

Brian David Henderson Wilson CBE (born 13 December 1948) is a Scottish former Labour Party politician. He was Member of Parliament for Cunninghame North from 1987 until 2005 and served as a minister of state from 1997 to 2003.

After standing down as a minister prior to his departure from Parliament, he was asked by Tony Blair to act as the Prime Minister's Special Representative on Overseas Trade. Having continued to take an interest in trade promotion, he was appointed to the newly re-established UK Board of Trade in 2017. He is also chairman of Harris Tweed Hebrides, interim chairman of Celtic Football Club and a visiting professor at the University of Strathclyde.

== Early life and career ==
Wilson was born in 1948 in Dunoon, Scotland and educated at the co-educational, comprehensive Dunoon Grammar School. He then studied at the University of Dundee and University College, Cardiff - where he was one of the first intake of 16 to the first-ever postgraduate journalism course in the UK, run by Tom Hopkinson of Picture Post fame. Wilson was the founding editor and publisher of the West Highland Free Press which he established along with three friends from Dundee University. In his student days, they had worked together promoting entertainment. In a BBC Alba documentary on his career, Wilson described promoting Pink Floyd in Dunoon in September 1968 as "the apex of my career". The early days of the West Highland Free Press were subsidised by revenue from entertainment promotion.

Founded in 1972, the newspaper was initially based at Kyleakin, on the isle of Skye, and continues to be published from Broadford, Skye. Its uniqueness lay in the radicalism of its political content, particularly on matters relating to the ownership of land, and its role as a local newspaper. It is credited with having exerted a strong influence over political debate in the Highlands and Islands, and - along with other concurrent initiatives such as the 7.84 production, The Cheviot, the Stag and the Black, Black Oil and publication of John MacEwen's book Who Owns Scotland? - restoring the land question to a place of prominence in Scottish politics. For his early work on the West Highland Free Press, Wilson was made the first recipient of the Nicholas Tomalin Memorial Award. He also wrote widely for national newspapers and, in 1977–78 he was involved in Seven Days, a political weekly in Scotland which folded after a few months.

Throughout the 1980s, one of his roles was as Scottish football correspondent for the Guardian, which led to him being invited to write the official history of Celtic FC, the team he had supported since childhood. He appeared in the influential 1980s LWT documentary in the Credo series which highlighted sectarianism in Scottish football when Wilson called for UEFA and FIFA to force the SFA to bring an end to Rangers' sectarian employment policy.

He was a member of the Scottish National Party for a short time in his teens, but shortly after the formation of the West Highland Free Press, which was launched in April 1972, joined the Labour Party and was soon invited to stand as its candidate in Ross and Cromarty which he contested in October 1974. He stood in two other Highlands and Islands constituencies - Inverness-shire and the Western Isles - in 1979 and 1983 respectively. An opponent of devolution, which he believed would work to the disadvantage of Scotland's more peripheral areas, in 1978 he was chairman of the "Labour Vote No Campaign", which called for a "no" vote in the 1979 Scottish devolution referendum on whether to have a Scottish Assembly. Wilson was part of a group known as the "Highland Luxemburgists" (that included Margaret Hope MacPherson and Allan Campbell McLean), who attempted each year at the party conference to pass a resolution to bring the crofts back into common ownership. However, the Labour Party leadership ignored the resolution and supported right of crofters to purchase their land.

== Political career ==
Wilson was selected to fight a more winnable seat and was elected to serve Cunninghame North constituency in 1987, winning the seat from the Conservative Party, and successfully held the seat in the 1992, 1997 and 2001 general elections. In opposition, Wilson was spokesperson on election planning (1996–1997), trade and industry (1994–1995), transport (1992–1994 and 1995–1996)—where he was recognised as an effective Parliamentary opponent of rail privatisation— and on Scottish affairs (1988–1992).

In his first ministerial role, as Scottish Office Minister for Education and Industry, he had responsibility for the Highlands and Islands which allowed him to deliver on some of the issues he had campaigned for over a long period. He established the Community Land Unit and the Fund on which community buy-outs of crofting estates was based. He was Scotland's first designated Minister for Gaelic, initiating the process which led to the establishment of a Gaelic television channel. Along with the Irish President, Mary Robinson, he launched Iomairt Cholm Cille in an effort to bring closer together the Gaelic-speaking communities of Scotland and Ireland. As Scottish Education Minister, he took a particular interest in Special Educational Needs and established the Beattie Committee to bring forward proposals, many of which were subsequently introduced, to improve post-school provision and strengthen SEN links with Further Education colleges.

In 2001, Wilson briefly served at the Foreign and Commonwealth Office with responsibility for Africa. In 2003, he voted in favour of the Iraq War. As Energy Minister from 2001 to 2003, he was a strong supporter of both renewable energy—which he had long championed as a journalist—and nuclear power, not least because of his familiarity with Hunterston nuclear power stations in his own constituency. According to one's point of view, he is either credited or blamed for doing more than any other politician to "keep the nuclear option open" through the early years of the Labour government, when many of his colleagues were determined to kill it off once and for all in Britain. As Energy Minister, Wilson always advocated what he termed a "balanced" power generation policy—including nuclear, coal pollution mitigation, natural gas and renewables—which eventually became the catch-phrase of government after his departure. Speaking at the Institution of Civil Engineers in June 2008, he joked if he had remained in politics, he would have been "knocked down in the rush" as his former foes on the nuclear issue—including the likes of Gordon Brown and Margaret Beckett—adopted the same position.

As trade minister and subsequently, Wilson took a great deal of interest in Cuba which he visited on a number of occasions in an effort to improve political and trade links. He has written extensively in defence of Cuba and about his meetings with Fidel Castro. Writing in The Guardian about Castro's decision to step down as Cuban President, Wilson said he had "outwitted the United States and its 50-year obsession one last time" by ensuring an orderly transition in government while he was still alive. While trade minister, Wilson was also closely involved in defending the Scottish cashmere industry in the face of hostile trade measures by the United States, during the so-called "Banana Wars" (1999–2000).

In August 2004, he announced his intention to step down from politics at the 2005 general election for family reasons.

== Later career ==
Wilson holds directorships in a number of businesses and continues to publicly comment on British Government energy policy, particularly on the subject of nuclear power, of which he is a supporter, and has written opinion pieces in national newspapers as well as appearing on television news programmes to air his views. Both as Energy Minister and subsequently, he has called for Britain to retain a balanced energy policy with contributions to our electricity needs from nuclear, renewables, coal pollution mitigation, and gas. He was also chair of Flying Matters which advocated a pro-aviation response to climate change. In April 2008, Wilson became a visiting professor in Media and Government at Glasgow Caledonian University. In September 2009, he was awarded an Honorary Fellowship by the University of the Highlands and Islands. Between 2009, and 2013, he was chair of Britain's Energy Coast, the economic development agency for West Cumbria. In 2017, he became a visiting professor at the University of Strathclyde. He was appointed a UK Business Ambassador under the coalition government in a non-political capacity in 2013 and continues to hold the role.

He has been closely identified with regeneration of the Harris Tweed industry in the Isle of Lewis, where he lives, and is chairman of Harris Tweed Hebrides who were named Textile Brand of the Year at the Vogue.com Scottish Fashion Awards in both 2009 and 2011 as well as UK Textile Company of the Year at the UK Fashion and Textile Awards in 2013. He is also a director of Celtic Football Club, which he has supported since childhood. Wilson wrote Celtic's official centenary history (Celtic, A Century With Honour, Collins Willow 1988) and more recently the Official History of Celtic to mark the club's 125th anniversary. Having maintained connections with Cuba, he is now chairman of Havana Energy, a UK-based company promoting renewable energy in Cuba which secured the first ever joint venture with the Cubans to build power stations fuelled by biomass from the sugar plantations. In April 2017, Wilson was present at Ciro Redondo in Cuba for the inauguration of the first of four power plants to be built by the JV, named Biopower, Havana Energy having partnered with the Shanghai Electric Company in the face of challenges presented by the US blockade of Cuba.

For his work with Harris Tweed Hebrides, Wilson was named Global Director of the Year at the Institute of Directors Scottish awards ceremony in February 2011. He was then named UK Global Director of the Year at IoD Awards in September 2011. Maintaining his long-standing interest in land reform, he was a director of Community Land Scotland, formed in 2010 as an umbrella body for community-owned estates covering 500,000 acres, mainly in the West Highlands and Islands. In 2013, he became a UK Business Ambassador and was asked by the Secretary of State for Scotland to carry out a review of Scottish exporting, which was published in 2014. He writes regular columns in The Scotsman and other publications. Up until July 2015, he wrote regular columns for the West Highland Free Press, which had been sold to its employees by the founders in 2008, and of which he had been the founding editor, but was controversially sacked when he defended fellow columnist Donald Macleod, who had written a piece about the spread of Islam in the UK. Wilson defended MacLeod's right to freedom of expression before he too was told in an e-mail from the editor his columns were no longer wanted. A third columnist, Maggie Cunningham, resigned in protest.

Wilson was a heavyweight spokesman for the "No" vote in the 2014 Scottish independence referendum and spoke at many rallies

He was appointed Commander of the Order of the British Empire (CBE) in the 2020 New Year Honours for services to charity and business in Scotland.

== Personal life ==
Wilson lives in Uig on the Isle of Lewis with his wife, Joni Buchanan, whose family is from the area. They have three children; his oldest son has Down syndrome, and Wilson has spoken out against prenatal testing for the disorder, opposing the "relentless pressure to eliminate people with Down's Syndrome".

== Positions held ==
- Privy Councillor (2003)
- non-executive director of Amec Foster Wheeler Nuclear (October 2005)
- non-executive director of Celtic plc
- Chair of the UK Operations Board of Airtricity
- Chair of Flying Matters (June 2007)
- Chair of Harris Tweed Hebrides

Parliament of the United Kingdom
Preceded by John Corrie	Member of Parliament for Cunninghame North; 1987–2005	Constituency abolished
