= Cunninghame South (UK Parliament constituency) =

UK Parliament constituency (1983–2005)

- Former county constituency for the House of Commons
- Boundary of Cunninghame South in Scotland for the 2001 general election
- Subdivisions of Scotland: North Ayrshire

1983–2005
- Seats: One
- Created from: Ayrshire Central; Bute and Northern Ayrshire
- Replaced by: North Ayrshire & Arran; Central Ayrshire

Cunninghame South was a constituency of the House of Commons of the Parliament of the United Kingdom (at Westminster) from 1983 until 2005. It was represented by one Member of Parliament (MP) elected by the first-past-the-post system of election.

In 2005 a northern area of the constituency was merged with Cunninghame North to form North Ayrshire and Arran. The rest of the Cunninghame South constituency was merged with a northern area from Ayr and a small area from Carrick, Cumnock and Doon Valley to form Central Ayrshire.

The Cunninghame South constituency of the Scottish Parliament, which was created in 1999 with the same boundaries as the Westminster constituency, continues in existence unaltered.

== Boundaries ==
The Cunninghame District electoral divisions of Irvine Central, Irvine South, and Kilwinning and Stevenston.

The constituency was created to cover part of the Cunninghame district of the Strathclyde region, and it included the town of Irvine. The rest of the district was covered by Cunninghame North.

In 1996 the Cunninghame district was reconstituted as the North Ayrshire council area, but the constituency boundaries remained unchanged until the seat disappeared in 2005.

== Members of Parliament ==
Election	Member	Party	Notes
1983	Constituency created, see Bute and Northern Ayrshire and Central Ayrshire		
1983	David Lambie	Labour	Previous MP for Central Ayrshire
1992	Brian Donohoe	Labour	Subsequent MP for Central Ayrshire
2005	Constituency abolished, see Central Ayrshire and North Ayrshire and Arran		

== Election results ==
=== Elections in the 1980s ===
General election 1983: Cunninghame South
Party	Candidate	Votes	%	±%
Labour	David Lambie	19,344	54.1	−0.2
Conservative	Phil Gallie	7,576	21.2	−5.5
Liberal	John Alan Boss	6,370	17.8	+9.2
SNP	Kay Ullrich	2,451	6.9	−3.5
Majority		11,768	32.9	−5.3
Turnout		35,741	73.6	
Labour win (new seat)				

General election 1987: Cunninghame South
Party	Candidate	Votes	%	±%
Labour	David Lambie	22,728	60.8	+6.7
Conservative	Eric Gibson	6,095	16.3	−4.9
Liberal	John Boss	4,426	11.9	−5.9
SNP	Kay Ullrich	4,115	11.0	+4.1
Majority		16,633	46.6	+13.7
Turnout		37,364	75.0	+1.4
Labour hold		Swing	+6.8	

=== Elections in the 1990s ===
General election 1992: Cunninghame South
Party	Candidate	Votes	%	±%
Labour	Brian Donohoe	19,687	52.9	−7.9
SNP	Ricky Bell	9,007	24.2	+13.2
Conservative	Sebastian Leslie	6,070	16.3	0.0
Liberal Democrats	Brian Ashley	2,299	6.2	−5.7
Natural Law	William Jackson	128	0.4	New
Majority		10,680	28.7	−17.9
Turnout		37,191	75.9	+0.9
Labour hold		Swing		

General election 1997: Cunninghame South
Party	Candidate	Votes	%	±%
Labour	Brian Donohoe	22,233	62.7	+9.8
SNP	Margaret Burgess	7,364	20.8	−3.4
Conservative	Pamela M. Paterson	3,571	10.1	−6.2
Liberal Democrats	Erlend Watson	1,604	4.5	−1.7
Socialist Labour	Krishna Edwin	494	1.4	New
Referendum	Allan Martlew	178	0.5	New
Majority		14,869	41.9	+13.2
Turnout		35,444	71.5	−4.4
Labour hold		Swing		

=== Elections in the 2000s ===
General election 2001: Cunninghame South
Party	Candidate	Votes	%	±%
Labour	Brian Donohoe	16,424	58.4	−4.3
SNP	Bill Kidd	5,194	18.5	−2.3
Conservative	Pamela Paterson	2,782	9.9	−0.2
Liberal Democrats	John Boyd	2,094	7.4	+2.9
Scottish Socialist	Rosemary Byrne	1,233	4.4	New
Socialist Labour	Bobby Cochrane	382	1.4	0.0
Majority		11,230	39.9	−2.0
Turnout		28,109	56.2	−15.3
Labour hold		Swing		
