= Cunninghame North (UK Parliament constituency) =

UK Parliament constituency (1983–2005)

- Former county constituency for the House of Commons
- Boundary of Cunninghame North in Scotland for the 2001 general election
- Subdivisions of Scotland: Cunninghame district

1983–2005
- Seats: One
- Created from: Bute and Northern Ayrshire; Ayrshire Central
- Replaced by: North Ayrshire and Arran

Cunninghame North was a county constituency represented in the House of Commons of the Parliament of the United Kingdom from 1983 until 2005. Thereafter, it was largely replaced by North Ayrshire and Arran. It elected one Member of Parliament (MP) using the first-past-the-post voting system.

The Scottish Parliament constituency also called Cunninghame North continues in existence.

== Boundaries ==
The Cunninghame District electoral divisions of Arran, Largs and West Kilbride; Garnock Valley; and Saltcoats and Ardrossan.

In 1996 the Cunninghame district was reconstituted as the North Ayrshire council area, but the constituency boundaries remained unchanged until the seat disappeared in 2005.

== Members of Parliament ==
Election	Member	Party
1983	John Corrie	Conservative
1987	Brian Wilson	Labour
2005	constituency abolished. See North Ayrshire & Arran	

== Election results ==
=== Elections of the 1980s ===
General election 1983: Cunninghame North
Party	Candidate	Votes	%	±%
Conservative	John Corrie	15,557	38.7	+0.6
Labour	John Carson	13,920	34.6	−4.3
SDP	Ralph Leishman	7,268	18.1	+11.3
SNP	Colin Cameron	3,460	8.6	−7.6
Majority		1,637	4.1	N/A
Turnout		40,205	75.7	
Conservative win (new seat)				

General election 1987: Cunninghame North
Party	Candidate	Votes	%	±%
Labour	Brian Wilson	19,061	44.4	+9.8
Conservative	John Corrie	14,594	34.0	−4.7
SDP	Douglas J. Herbison	5,185	12.1	−6.0
SNP	Matthew Brown	4,076	9.5	+0.9
Majority		4,467	10.4	N/A
Turnout		42,916	78.3	+2.6
Labour gain from Conservative		Swing		

=== Elections of the 1990s ===
General election 1992: Cunninghame North
Party	Candidate	Votes	%	±%
Labour	Brian Wilson	17,564	41.0	−3.4
Conservative	Edith Clarkson	14,625	34.1	+0.1
SNP	David M. Crossan	7,813	18.2	+8.7
Liberal Democrats	Douglas J. Herbison	2,864	6.7	−5.4
Majority		2,939	6.9	−3.5
Turnout		42,866	73.8	−4.5
Labour hold		Swing		

General election 1997: Cunninghame North
Party	Candidate	Votes	%	±%
Labour	Brian Wilson	20,686	50.3	+9.3
Conservative	Janet Mitchell	9,647	23.5	−10.6
SNP	Kim Nicoll	7,584	18.4	+0.2
Liberal Democrats	Karen Freel	2,271	5.5	−1.2
Socialist Labour	Louise McDaid	501	1.2	New
Referendum	Ian Winton	440	1.1	New
Majority		11,039	26.8	+19.9
Turnout		41,129	73.3	−0.5
Labour hold		Swing		

=== Elections of the 2000s ===
General election 2001: Cunninghame North
Party	Candidate	Votes	%	±%
Labour	Brian Wilson	15,571	46.0	−4.3
SNP	Campbell Martin	7,173	21.2	+2.8
Conservative	Richard Wilkinson	6,666	19.7	−3.8
Liberal Democrats	Ross Chmiel	3,060	9.0	+3.5
Scottish Socialist	Sean Scott	964	2.9	New
Socialist Labour	Louise McDaid	382	1.1	−0.1
Majority		8,398	24.8	−2.0
Turnout		33,816	61.5	−11.8
Labour hold		Swing		
