= Eastbourne by-election =

Eastbourne by-election may refer to:

- 1925 Eastbourne by-election (Sir George Ambrose Lloyd elevated to the peerage)
- 1932 Eastbourne by-election (death of Edward Marjoribanks)
- 1935 Eastbourne by-election (death of John Slater)
- 1990 Eastbourne by-election (assassination of Ian Gow)
