= Stephen Terrell =

British barrister and Liberal Party politician

Colonel Stephen Terrell OBE TD DL QC (15 June 1916 – 16 August 2004), served with the 3rd & 8th Parachute Battalions during World War II, and was wounded in action in the later stages of the Normandy campaign in 1944 while serving as a company commander. After the war he became a British barrister and Liberal Party politician.

== Background ==
He was educated at Trinity College, Glenalmond and University College London. In 1951 he married Diana Marion Hartwell. They had two sons. He was awarded the OBE in 1952.

== Professional career ==
He was Called to the Bar by Gray's Inn in 1946. In 1965 he took silk. He became a Bencher at Gray's Inn in 1970. He was appointed a Deputy Lieutenant for Middlesex and then in 1961 for Greater London.

== Political career ==
He was Liberal candidate for the Eastbourne division of Sussex at the 1964 General Election. He was elected to the Liberal party national executive. He was Chairman of the Liberal's Home Office panel. He contested Eastbourne again in 1966, 1970 and February 1974 general elections, each time without success. He served as President of the Liberal Party from 1971 to 1972. After failing to win Eastbourne for the fourth time, he did not stand for parliament again.

=== Electoral record ===
General Election 1964: Eastbourne
Party	Candidate	Votes	%	±%
Conservative	Charles Stuart Taylor	26,410	49.0	
Liberal	Stephen Terrell	15,441	28.7	+10.3
Labour	J E M Baker	12,034	22.3	
Majority		10,969	20.4	
Turnout		53,885	76.7	
Conservative hold		Swing		

General Election 1966: Eastbourne
Party	Candidate	Votes	%	±%
Conservative	Charles Stuart Taylor	26,039	46.3	
Liberal	Stephen Terrell	16,746	29.8	+1.1
Labour	John Harold High	12,620	22.4	
Independent	Vernon Hubert Petty	883	1.6	
Majority		9,293	16.5	
Turnout		56,288	77.2	
Conservative hold		Swing		

General Election 1970: Eastbourne
Party	Candidate	Votes	%	±%
Conservative	Sir Charles Stuart Taylor	30,296	48.8	
Liberal	Stephen Terrell	23,308	37.5	+7.8
Labour	Cyril G Abley	8,475	13.7	
Majority		6,988	11.3	
Turnout		62,079	73.7	
Conservative hold		Swing	–	

General Election February 1974: Eastbourne
Party	Candidate	Votes	%	±%
Conservative	Ian Reginald Edward Gow	31,462	51.3	
Liberal	Stephen Terrell	23,987	39.1	+2.6
Labour	David Dawson	5,874	9.6	
Majority		7,475	12.2	
Turnout		61,323	82.6	
Conservative hold		Swing		

Party political offices
Preceded by Inga-Stina Robson	President of the Liberal Party; 1971–1972	Succeeded by Trevor Jones
