= Hubert Beaumont =

Hubert Beaumont may refer to:

- Hubert Beaumont (Labour politician) (1883–1948), British Labour MP for Batley and Morley
- Hubert Beaumont (Liberal politician) (1864–1922), British Liberal MP for Eastbourne
