= Edward Lindsay =

Edward Lindsay may refer to:

- Edward Lindsay (politician), Texas politician in 2006 Texas House of Representatives election
- Edward Lindsay-Hogg of the Lindsay-Hogg Baronets

== See also ==
- Ed Lindsey, Georgia politician
- Ted Lindsay (disambiguation)
