= Edward Field =

Edward Field may refer to:

- Edward Field (poet) (1924–2026), American poet and author
- Edward Field (Royal Navy officer) (1828–1912), Royal Navy officer and English politician
- Edward Salisbury Field (1878–1936), American author, playwright, artist, poet, and journalist
