= 1935 Eastbourne by-election =

UK parliamentary by-election

The 1935 Eastbourne by-election was a by-election held on 29 March 1935 for the British House of Commons constituency of Eastbourne in East Sussex.

The by-election was caused by the death of the town's Conservative Party Member of Parliament (MP) John Slater, who had been elected only three years previously, in a 1932 by-election following the death of Edward Marjoribanks.

The Conservative candidate, Charles Taylor, was returned unopposed.

== See also ==
- List of United Kingdom by-elections
- Eastbourne constituency
- 1925 Eastbourne by-election
- 1932 Eastbourne by-election
- 1990 Eastbourne by-election
