= Nigel Waterson =

British politician

Member of Parliament for Eastbourne
- In office 9 April 1992 – 12 April 2010
- Preceded by: David Bellotti
- Succeeded by: Stephen Lloyd

Personal details
- Born: 12 October 1950 (age 75) Leeds, West Riding of Yorkshire, England
- Party: Conservative
- Spouse: Barbara Judge (m. 1999)
- Children: 2
- Education: Leeds Grammar School
- Alma mater: The Queen's College, Oxford

Nigel Christopher Waterson (born 12 October 1950) is a British former politician. He was the Conservative Member of Parliament for Eastbourne from 1992 until 2010. Waterson was a junior minister in the government of John Major. He has been the chairman of the Equity Release Council since 2012. Waterson is currently chair of Dunsfold Parish Council.

== Early life ==
He attended Leeds Grammar School (then a direct grant grammar school) and at The Queen's College, Oxford he read law, graduating with a BA in 1971. He became a barrister and founded the firm Waterson Hicks. From 1974 to 1978 he was a councillor on Hammersmith and Fulham borough council.

== Parliamentary career ==
He contested Islington South and Finsbury in 1979.

Waterson was the Shadow Minister for Pensions and Conservative Spokesman for Older People. He is a patron of many local charities, including President of the Eastbourne Constitutional Club and Vice President for Age Concern - Eastbourne. In the Conservative leadership contest in 2005 he backed Ken Clarke to be the next leader before Clarke lost in a preliminary round.

Waterson lost his seat to the Liberal Democrat Stephen Lloyd in the 2010 general election. This was just following the parliamentary expenses scandal, and Lloyd used his campaign literature to make claims about Waterson's expenses. Following the election, Waterson sued Lloyd for libel over these statements. Waterson lost this case on appeal in 2013, after winning the initial High Court case in 2011.

== Personal life ==
Waterson married Barbara Judge in 1999. He had two previous marriages, both ending in divorce, and has a son and a daughter. On 29 January 2008, Waterson was arrested for allegedly assaulting his two teenage children. In 2010 the Metropolitan Police Service apologised for any distress caused by the arrest, accepting the allegations were wholly unfounded, and paid damages and costs to Waterson in settlement of a civil claim for wrongful arrest and false imprisonment.

In January 2019 his adopted son, Stephen Waterson, was put on trial accused of manslaughter crushing his girlfriend's three year old son, Alfie, with his electric car seat. This occurred because Stephen did not allow Alfie to sit in a seat and put him in the footwell of the car. When Alfie cried in pain as he only had 30 cm of room, Stephen moved his own car seat back because he would “not be told what to do by a three year old”. This gave Alfie just 9 cm of room, causing asphyxia, which gave Alfie a fatal catastrophic brain injury. He was also accused of intimidating the driver of the car. His girlfriend was found guilty of child cruelty in May 2019, and sentenced to two and a half years in prison, but the jury failed to reach a verdict on Stephen Waterson. On the first day of his re-trial in September 2019, he changed his plea to guilty of manslaughter by gross negligence. Stephen Waterson was jailed for seven years.

Parliament of the United Kingdom
Preceded by David Bellotti	Member of Parliament for Eastbourne; 1992–2010	Succeeded by Stephen Lloyd
