= Reginald Hall =

Royal Navy Admiral; Director of Naval Intelligence, and politician (1870–1943)

Admiral Sir Reginald Hall KCMG CB
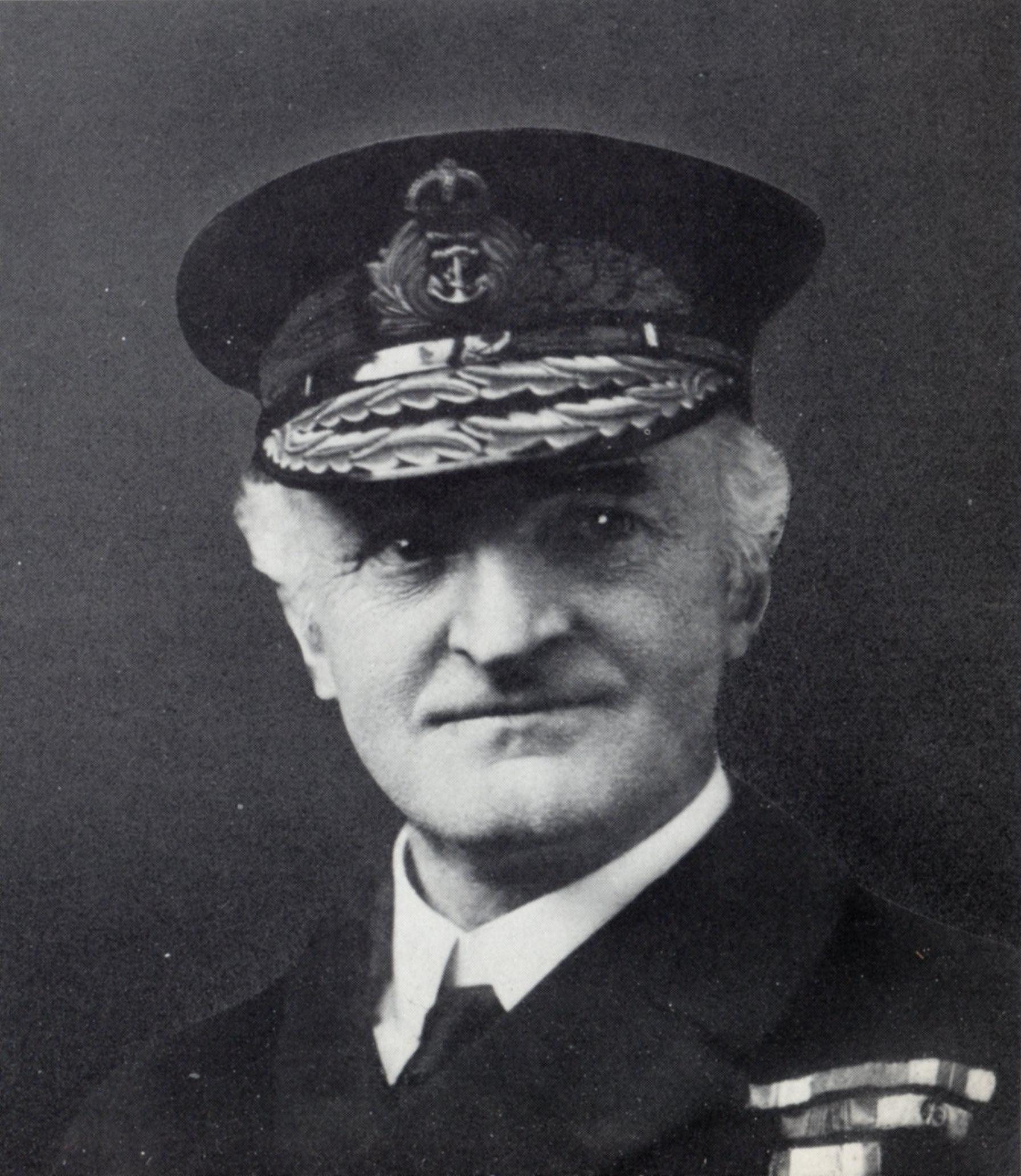
- Admiral Hall in 1919
- Born: 28 June 1870; Britford, Wiltshire
- Died: 22 October 1943 (aged 73)
- Military career
- Allegiance: United Kingdom / British Empire
- Branch: Royal Navy
- Service years: 1884–1919
- Nickname: Blinker
- Conflicts: World War I
- Awards: Knight Commander of the Order of St Michael and St George; Companion of the Order of the Bath; Order of the Rising Sun, Gold and Silver Star

Admiral Sir William Reginald Hall KCMG CB (28 June 1870 – 22 October 1943), known as Blinker Hall, was the British Director of Naval Intelligence from 1914 to 1919. Together with Sir Alfred Ewing, he was responsible for the establishment of the Royal Navy's codebreaking operation, Room 40, which decoded the Zimmermann telegram, a major factor in the entry of the United States into World War I.

== Early life ==
Reginald Hall was born at Britford, near Salisbury in Wiltshire, on 28 June 1870. He was the eldest son of Captain William Henry Hall, the first head of Naval Intelligence, who had married the daughter of the Reverend George Armfield from Armley, Leeds. Hall decided on a naval career for himself when taken on a cruise on board HMS Flamingo by his father.

== Royal Navy career ==
Hall joined the training ship HMS Britannia in 1884 and two years later was appointed to the armoured cruiser Northampton. After a year he was transferred to the ironclad battleship Bellerophon which was part of the North American Station. In 1889 he became acting sub-lieutenant before attending courses for his Lieutenant's examinations at Greenwich, the gunnery school and torpedo school, where he achieved first class grades in all five of the subjects. Now as Lieutenant he was posted to the China Station where he served on the flagship, the armoured cruiser Imperieuse. In 1892 he was recommended to train as a gunnery officer, which involved a course in mathematics at the Royal Naval College, Greenwich, followed by a year's course at the gunnery school at HMS Excellent, a shore establishment at Whale Island, Portsmouth. Having qualified, he remained for a year on the staff.

In 1894 Hall married Ethel Wootton de Wiveslie Abney, daughter of Sir William. The engagement had begun when he was aged 19, five years before, but at the time this was considered a young age for a naval officer to get married. In 1895 he was appointed as gunnery lieutenant on the cruiser Australia where he served for two years before being appointed to the senior staff at Whale Island. He was promoted to commander 1 January 1901, in recognition of services with naval forces in South Africa, and later served on the battleship Magnificent, flagship of the second in command of the Channel Fleet.

In 1904 he became commander of the pre-dreadnought battleship Cornwallis which was commissioning with a new crew to operate in the Mediterranean. Hall had a reputation as a strict disciplinarian with an ability to get the best out of a crew, so he was given some of the worst sailors to bring up to scratch. A trick of disaffected sailors was to remove gunsights and throw them overboard, and indeed this happened. Hall instructed the master at arms to look out for two sailors who had previously been friends but who now avoided each other. He took one, told him that the other had confessed they had removed the sights, and the sailor duly confessed. Behaviour on board improved. Although Hall imposed discipline strictly, he also showed concern for the men he commanded and for their welfare, which was unusual for that time. He took particular care for the boys and junior seamen.

In December 1905 he was promoted to captain and appointed by the First Sea Lord, Sir John Fisher, as Inspecting Captain of the new Mechanical Training Establishments, which Fisher had established to give engineering training to ordinary sailors (1906–7). He was next appointed captain of the cadet training ship HMS Cornwall. Although not a conventional warship, this now involved Hall in intelligence work. The ship visited foreign ports, particularly in Germany which was now seen as the navy's greatest potential enemy. In the summer of 1909, Hall started a tour of the Baltic Sea with a long list of places to investigate. The cruise involved entertaining and welcoming on board royalty and other officials, including Kaiser Wilhelm II, Queen Maud of Wales and Princess Margaret of Connaught. However, naval officers onboard also engaged in the covert reporting of fortifications and beaches for amphibious landing. In Kiel he was tasked with discovering how many slips had been constructed for building large vessels. To do this he devised a ruse with the help of the Duke of Westminster, who was visiting the port and agreed to lend his motor boat for the task. Hall and a couple of officers dressed down as sailors and took the yacht on a full speed circuit of the harbour, pretending to break down by the naval dockyard. A concealed camera was then used to take photographs of the installations. More information was discovered by careful questions ashore.

In 1910 two officers, Lieutenant Brandon and Captain Bernard Frederick Trench, who had been part of Hall's crew gathering intelligence, were sent on a 'holiday' in Germany to collect information about coastal defences by Captain Regnart of the intelligence division. The two were captured and served two-and-a-half years of a four-year sentence, before being pardoned in May 1913 as part of a visit by King George V to Germany. The admiralty then denied any responsibility for what had happened to the pair and their considerable financial loss as a result. When appointed director of intelligence, Hall arranged for them to be compensated.

Hall was appointed to the armoured cruiser Natal following the death of her captain, F.C.A. Ogilvy. Ogilvy had obtained a high reputation for his ship which had beaten all records at gunnery but Hall managed to step into Ogilvy's place, retaining the confidence of the crew and bettering the gunnery record the following year. His reputation for unorthodox treatment of his men continued to grow, making it his business to reform recalcitrant sailors rather than simply punishing them. He had the knack of threatening men with punishments he could not deliver (such as dismissal from the service) if they did not reform, and succeeded. Natal was called upon to assist a sailing ship, the Celtic Race, which had lost most of her sails in a storm and was in danger of sinking. Despite the risk to his own ship, he escorted Celtic Race into Milford Haven. He was rewarded by the owners and underwriters, being presented with a silver table centrepiece by the Lord Mayor of Liverpool on their behalf.

From 1911 to 1913 he served as assistant to the Controller of the Royal Navy.

In 1913 he became captain of the battlecruiser Queen Mary. When he took over he was asked to take part in an experiment by the Admiralty to dispense with ships' police, transferring their duties to petty officers. He also introduced an innovation of his own, to divide the ship's crew into three watches rather than the customary two. Hall believed that in the war with Germany which he expected, it would be impossible to run a ship continuously with just two watches. The change attracted much ridicule but when war came it was adopted on all large ships. A religious man, he arranged that a chapel was provided on board the ship, and this innovation too was adopted generally. He felt it important that the authority of petty officers should be boosted, and he did this by improving their quarters. He arranged for washing machines on board, for the convenience of the officers who no longer had to pay for laundry ashore, and to the benefit of sailors who were 'tipped' to carry out the washing. He introduced a bookshop on board, and the navy's first shipboard cinema. Inadequacies in the water supply meant that it took an hour for all the stokers to finish washing after duty: Hall insisted that his engineers find a solution to provide enough hot water that they could all wash in 15 minutes, giving them more free time. These changes too became standard. Hall was criticised for being too soft with his crews, but his requirements for discipline were not relaxed. Rather, he believed that reward was necessary as well as punishment. Living conditions in society were improving generally and he believed the Navy must keep pace with standards ashore.

Queen Mary took part in the battlecruiser squadron's visit to Kronstadt, where the fleet officers and sailors were entertained by the Russian royal family, and a lavish ball was held on board ship as the culmination of the visit. It was the last such visit before World War I commenced and the battlecruisers transferred to their initial wartime base at Scapa Flow. Ships spent long periods at sea, before the strategic situation became clearer and the fear of immediate German raids diminished. Queen Mary took part in the Battle of Heligoland Bight, where the battlecruisers were called upon to support a raid by destroyers and cruisers against German patrol ships operating off Heligoland. The raid was hailed as a British success, although behind the scenes it was marred by poor communications between the British forces involved.

Hall's health had deteriorated under the stress of continuous sea service, and after three months matters had reached the point where he was obliged to request posting away from the ship.

== Director of the Intelligence Divisions ==
His seagoing career cut short by ill-health, Hall was appointed Director of the Intelligence Division (DID) by the Admiralty in October 1914, replacing Captain Henry Oliver. According to Oliver, Hall's wife wrote to him on behalf of her husband requesting that he replace Oliver in the Intelligence Division. Hall served as DID (the title eventually reverted to the pre-1911 "DNI") until January 1919, when he retired from active duty. It turned out to be a fortunate appointment, for he was responsible for building up the naval intelligence organization during the war, encouraged codebreaking and radio-intercept efforts, and provided the fleet with good intelligence, making the division the pre-eminent British intelligence agency during the war. He also encouraged cooperation with other British intelligence organizations, such as MI5 (under Vernon Kell), MI6 (under Mansfield Smith-Cumming) and the Special Branch of Scotland Yard (under Basil Thomson).

=== Ireland ===
==== Easter Rising ====
Thanks to intercepts from Room 40, Hall was instrumental in the interception of the steamer Aud, which was carrying German arms to Ireland, on 21 April 1916 by HMS Bluebell. That morning the man who had organised the arms shipment, Sir Roger Casement, was arrested in Tralee Bay after disembarking from a German U-Boat. Hall was aware that the Easter Rising was to take place in Dublin, but refused to reveal his sources, so that when information of the rising reached the government its authenticity was questioned. Hall interrogated Casement and allegedly refused him the opportunity to make a public demand for the cancellation of the uprising.

==== 'German Plot' ====
When the United States broke off diplomatic relations with Germany, intercepted traffic between the US German legation and Berlin dried up as a key source of British intelligence. Less reliable information was used by intelligence chiefs including Admiral Hall, such as 'spy-obsessed loyalist residents in Ireland'. The mass arrests of known Sinn Féin activists, following the discovery of a spurious 'German Plot' in Ireland has been interpreted as:

a striking illustration of the apparent manipulation of intelligence in order to prod the Irish authorities into more forceful action...when the British Government was unable to provide convincing evidence of a 'German Plot', nationalist Ireland concluded that it had been invented as retribution for the defeat of conscription.'

In that analysis, Irish public opinion was wrong. Based on the faulty intelligence information made available to them, 'British ministers sincerely believed the threat was real'.

=== German counter-intelligence ===
Room 40's decryptions also led to the capture of Captain Franz von Rintelen, a veteran field agent in the intelligence wing of the German Imperial Navy, who had operated covertly in the still neutral United States and, among many other things, had financed and encouraged strikes by anti-war labor unions, attempted a hostile takeover of the Du Pont corporation, and firebombed munitions ships and armaments factories.

In 1917, Hall was awarded the Japanese Order of the Rising Sun, Gold and Silver Star, which represents the second highest of eight classes associated with the award. In that same year, he was promoted to rear-admiral. He was knighted in 1918 and was promoted to vice-admiral in 1922 and to full admiral in 1926, both on the retired list.

== Political career ==
Upon retirement Hall served as a Conservative Member of Parliament (MP) for Liverpool West Derby from 1919 to 1923, then for Eastbourne 1925–1929. As an MP, in 1919 he and a group of industrialists founded a group to counter subversive actions against free enterprise known as National Propaganda, which was later renamed the Economic League. Even in the House of Commons he was still said to be involved in the Zinoviev letter affair in 1924, which led to the victory of the Conservatives in the general election of that year. In the 1920s and 1930s he travelled extensively in the United States to give lectures on intelligence gathering matters.

== Later life ==
Too old to return to active service on the outbreak of World War II, Hall nevertheless served in the Home Guard until his death.

Despite his retirement from military and political life, Hall by the late 1930s had been identified as an important target person by the National Socialist police apparatus: in early 1940 the Reichssicherheitshauptamt in Berlin, the headquarters of the intelligence service of the SS, added his name to the Sonderfahndungsliste G.B., a list of people residing in Britain, whom the Nazi leadership and/or its intelligence service regarded as particularly important or (from their point of view) dangerous and who for that reason were slated to be tracked down and apprehended with heightened priority by special task forces of the SS, that were to follow on the heels of the occupying forces in case of a successful invasion of the British islands by the Wehrmacht.

Hall was described by the U.S. Ambassador to the Court of St. James's Walter Page as a "clear case of genius", while American attaché Edward Bell described him as "a perfectly marvelous person but the coldest-hearted proposition that ever was – he'd eat a man's heart and hand it back to him."

== Personal life ==
Hall was known as "Blinker" on account of a chronic facial twitch, which caused one of his eyes to "flash like a Navy signal lamp". Such a twitch is thought to be symptomatic of a mild form of dyspraxia.

== Honours and awards ==
- Knight Commander of the Order of St Michael and St George
- Companion of the Order of the Bath
- Order of the Rising Sun, Gold and Silver Star (Japan)
- Commander of the Order of St. Maurice and St. Lazarus (Italy)
- Commander of the Legion of Honour (France)
- Navy Distinguished Service Medal (USA)
- Grand Officer of the Order of the Crown of Italy

== Notes ==
Military offices
Preceded by Henry Oliver	Director of Naval Intelligence; 1914–1919	Succeeded by Hugh Sinclair
Parliament of the United Kingdom
Preceded by Sir F. E. Smith	Member of Parliament for Liverpool West Derby; 1919–1923	Succeeded by Sydney Jones
Preceded by Sir George Lloyd	Member of Parliament for Eastbourne; 1925–1929	Succeeded by Edward Marjoribanks
Party political offices
Preceded by Sir Malcolm Fraser	Principal Agent of the Conservative Party; 1923 – 1924	Succeeded by Herbert Blain
