= David Bellotti =

British politician (1943–2015)

Member of the Bath and North East Somerset Council for Lyncombe
- In office 1 May 2003 – 7 May 2015
- Preceded by: Ann Harding
- Succeeded by: Mark Shelford

Member of Parliament for Eastbourne
- In office 18 October 1990 – 16 March 1992
- Preceded by: Ian Gow
- Succeeded by: Nigel Waterson

Member of the East Sussex County Council
- In office 6 May 1993 – 1 May 1997
- Preceded by: C. Cole
- Succeeded by: Olive Woodall
- Constituency: Park
- In office 7 May 1981 – 6 May 1993
- Preceded by: J. Houghton
- Succeeded by: Mary McPherson
- Constituency: Lewes East (1981‍–‍1985); Ringmer (1985‍–‍1993)

Personal details
- Born: David Frank Bellotti; 13 August 1943
- Died: 10 June 2015 (aged 71)
- Party: Liberal (until 1988); Liberal Democrats (1988‍–‍2015)
- Spouses: Shelia Jones (m. 1965, divorced); Jennifer Compson (m. 1973, divorced); Jo Brown (m. 1996)
- Children: 5
- Education: University of Sussex (MA)

David Frank Bellotti (13 August 1943 – 10 June 2015) was a British Liberal Democrat politician who was Member of Parliament (MP) for the Eastbourne constituency from 1990 to 1992.

He was the first Liberal Democrat politician to win a parliamentary election, following the formation of the party through the merger of the Liberal Party and the SDP. He was also the most recent UK Member of Parliament to successfully take a seat from an opposing party following the assassination of the incumbent politician.

== Early life ==
Bellotti attended Exeter School and then went on to complete diplomas in youth service and counselling. He studied part-time at the University of Sussex, gaining a MA in education policy.

== Political career ==
Bellotti first contested the Eastbourne seat at the 1979 general election, subsequently fighting Lewes in the 1983 and 1987 general elections under the Liberal banner. He then won the parliamentary seat of Eastbourne for the Liberal Democrats in the 1990 by-election following the assassination of Conservative MP Ian Gow by the Provisional Irish Republican Army (IRA). He became the first person to be elected as a Liberal Democrat MP after the party was formed in 1988 by a merger of the Liberal Party and the SDP. Bellotti's win was both unexpected and controversial, with Conservative MP Ann Widdecombe noting: "Bellotti is the innocent beneficiary of murder. I suspect as last night as the Liberal Democrats were toasting their success, in its hideouts the IRA were doing the same thing". After Bellotti's win, future by-elections resulting from assassinations of MPs saw most parties decline to contest the seat. The shock defeat contributed to the end of Margaret Thatcher's premiership in November 1990, as Conservative MPs worried if they could hold their seats at a general election if she remained prime minister.

Two years later, Bellotti was defeated by Nigel Waterson in the 1992 general election in which John Major's Conservative government was re-elected.

He subsequently unsuccessfully contested the East Sussex and Kent South constituency in the 1994 elections to the European Parliament.

Bellotti returned to local government, regaining a seat on East Sussex County Council and was elected chairman of Sussex Police Authority. He then became CEO of Brighton & Hove Albion, a position in which he controversially took part in the sale of the indebted football club's stadium after its articles of association had been changed to allow for profit to be made on the sale of the Goldstone Ground. This change was, however, reversed on the insistence of the Football Association, preventing directors from taking out more than they had invested. Bellotti became reviled by Brighton fans and left the area shortly afterwards.

After leaving the football club and losing his council seat, Bellotti moved to Bath and became the election agent for Don Foster MP. In May 2003, David Bellotti was elected councillor for Lyncombe ward on Bath and North East Somerset council and was re-elected in 2007 and 2011. He was appointed as chairman of the council for 2008/9 and was the council's cabinet member for resources for four years. He died on 10 June 2015, aged 71.

== Personal life ==
Bellotti married three times. His first wife was Shelia Jones, whom he married in 1965, and they had a son and a daughter. He then married Jennifer Compson in 1973, with the couple having a son. His third wife was Jo Brown, whom he married in 1996, and with whom he had a son and daughter.

== See also ==
- 1990 Eastbourne by-election

Parliament of the United Kingdom
Preceded by Ian Gow	Member of Parliament for Eastbourne; 1990–1992	Succeeded by Nigel Waterson
