= Stephen Lloyd =

British politician (born 1957)

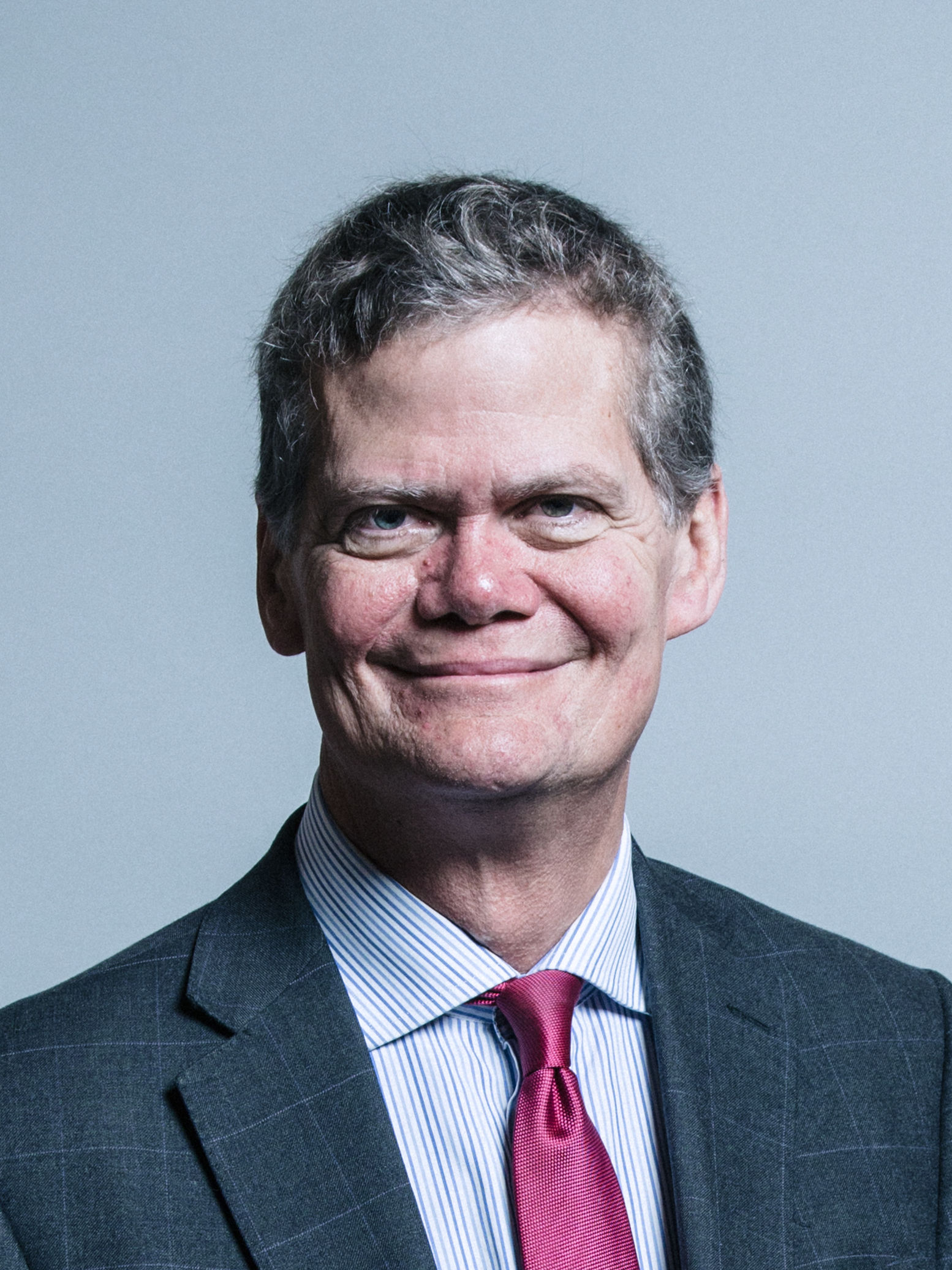
- Lloyd in 2017

Liberal Democrat Spokesperson for Work and Pensions
- In office 16 June 2017 – 6 December 2018
- Leader: Tim Farron; Vince Cable
- Preceded by: Baroness Bakewell
- Succeeded by: Christine Jardine

Parliamentary Private Secretary to the Secretary of State for Energy and Climate Change
- In office 9 January 2014 – 12 December 2014
- Prime Minister: David Cameron
- Preceded by: Steve Gilbert
- Succeeded by: Paul Maynard

Member of Parliament for Eastbourne
- In office 8 June 2017 – 6 November 2019
- Preceded by: Caroline Ansell
- Succeeded by: Caroline Ansell
- In office 6 May 2010 – 30 March 2015
- Preceded by: Nigel Waterson
- Succeeded by: Caroline Ansell

Personal details
- Born: 15 June 1957 (age 69) Mombasa, Kenya Colony
- Party: Parliamentary affiliation: Independent (2018–2019); Liberal Democrats (until 2018, 2019–); Party membership: Liberal Democrats
- Domestic partner: Cherine Maskill (2003–present)
- Education: St George's College, Weybridge
- Occupation: Business Development Director

Stephen Anthony Christopher Lloyd (born 15 June 1957) is a British Liberal Democrat politician who was twice Member of Parliament (MP) for the seat of Eastbourne.

Born in Kenya, he was privately educated in Surrey, before working first as a commodity broker and then in business development roles. He became resident in his constituency before (and remained so since) his 2005 candidature and became its MP, a predominantly single-town seat by population, at various times from 2010.

First elected in the 2010 general election, he served for all five years of the 2010–2015 UK parliament and supported the Cameron–Clegg coalition. Having lost his seat to the Conservative candidate Caroline Ansell in the 2015 general election, Lloyd went on to regain it in 2017 and served as the Liberal Democrat spokesperson for Work and Pensions.

On 6 December 2018, Lloyd resigned the Liberal Democrat whip, saying that his party's position on Brexit was inconsistent with his pledge to his constituency that he would "respect the result" of the 2016 EU referendum. Until 29 October 2019, Lloyd sat in the House of Commons as an Independent, remaining a member of the Liberal Democrat party, but had the whip restored following the announcement of the general election, and the "clean-slate" opportunity to be on the ballot paper as a committed remainer. He was again defeated by Caroline Ansell at the 2019 general election.

== Early life and career ==
Lloyd was born on 15 June 1957 in the coastal city of Mombasa, Kenya, to John Lloyd and Nuala Lloyd. He was educated in the UK from the age of eight at the independent St George's College, Weybridge in Surrey.

Lloyd is hearing-impaired. At the age of six, having contracted measles, Lloyd lost all hearing in his left ear, retaining only partial hearing in his right.

Prior to becoming an MP, Lloyd worked in business for over 20 years. From 1977 to 1980, he worked as a commodity broker for Cominco. From 1998 to 2005, he was a business development director at the Grass Roots Group. From 2005 to 2010, Lloyd worked for the Federation of Small Businesses as a business development consultant.

== Political career ==
=== Early candidacy ===
Lloyd first contested the Beaconsfield constituency, in Buckinghamshire at the 2001 general election. He came in third place behind the Labour candidate Stephen Lathrope and the victor, Dominic Grieve of the Conservatives. Lloyd received 9,117 votes and a 21.6% share of the vote.

In 2002, Lloyd was selected by the Liberal Democrats to be their next candidate for the constituency of Eastbourne in East Sussex. Viewed as a high target seat for the party, selection was competitive and he beat future parliamentary colleagues Duncan Hames and Tessa Munt to the final nomination. Lloyd spent the next three years becoming engaged in local causes, in preparation for the next general election. At the 2005 general election, Lloyd lost to the sitting Conservative MP, Nigel Waterson.

Lloyd continued to campaign locally for various causes, including leading opposition to plans to build a new B&Q megastore in Sovereign Harbour, which was subsequently refused by the planning committee of the Liberal Democrat-controlled Eastbourne Borough Council in October 2005.

=== First term ===
At the 2010 general election, Lloyd's campaign centred on local issues and highlighting of the expenses claims of his Conservative Party opponent, Nigel Waterson. He also asked to be lent votes by local supporters of the Labour and Green parties. Liberal Democrat leader Nick Clegg hosted his eve of poll rally, where former Conservative MP Ernle Money, who had moved to Eastbourne, pledged his support to Lloyd. On 7 May, Lloyd was elected the MP for Eastbourne with a majority of 3,435 votes.

Waterson subsequently sued Lloyd for libel over the contents of Lloyd's election leaflets, which had called Waterson an "expenses scandal MP". On 9 December 2011, the High Court ruled that Lloyd had defamed Waterson. Lloyd appealed, and on 28 February 2013 the Court of Appeal found in Lloyd's favour, overturning the original judgment.

From 2010 to 2015, Lloyd served as the Liberal Democrats' spokesperson for Northern Ireland in the House of Commons. Over the same period, Lloyd served on the Work and Pensions Select Committee in the House of Commons. He was thought by the Labour opposition to be wavering about supporting changes to housing benefit presented to the committee, but declared that he supported the "direction of travel" of the government. He campaigned for concessions from the Department for Work and Pensions in relation to Personal Independence Payment descriptors to ensure that people with reduced mobility would still be entitled to their Motability vehicles.

In 2010, Lloyd lobbied the Government to reconsider its planned reforms to student visa regulations, which threatened the future of English language schools, arguing it was "nonsensical" to require overseas students to speak the language before they came to study it.

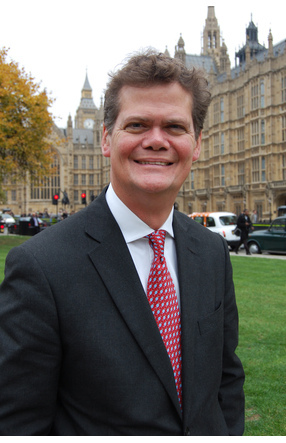
Lloyd outside parliament in March 2013

Throughout his first term in Parliament, Lloyd served as chair of a number of all-party parliamentary groups including those for Citizens Advice, microfinance, apprenticeships and further education and skills. He also served as vice chair of the APPGs on deafness, mental health, dementia, ageing and older people, town centre management, multiple sclerosis, trading standards, pharmacy, and justice for Equitable Life policyholders. Additionally, the Federation of Small Businesses and City and Guilds of London Institute invited him to be their respective champions in parliament.

Lloyd founded the All Party Parliamentary Group on religious education in schools in 2010. He has led campaigns to improve, encourage and support RE teaching of the world's major faiths, and of the non-religious, in schools in England and Wales. The chair of the Religious Education Council praised him in The Times as a "key player" in promoting the importance of effective RE teaching in schools.

From January to December 2014, Lloyd served as Parliamentary Private Secretary to the Secretary of State for Energy and Climate Change Ed Davey. Lloyd resigned this position in December 2014 over his "profound disappointment" that the Department for Transport's new road investment strategy did not meet the demands of a local campaign to properly improve the A27 road.

Lloyd rarely rebelled against the coalition government on any parliamentary matter. Notable exceptions included his vote against tuition fee increases, which he later said the party "should have died in a ditch" to defend their position on. Lloyd has argued that by entering the 2010–15 coalition government, the Liberal Democrats "saved the country" but "killed themselves".

=== Defeat ===
Lloyd lost his seat at the 2015 general election to the Conservative Party candidate, Caroline Ansell, who won by 733 votes. Later that month, Lloyd announced he would retire from politics. A resident-led fundraising campaign formed within days of Lloyd's defeat, with the aim of supporting him to contest the next general election. Lloyd refused the donations and urged that they were instead directed to Save the DGH, the local group campaign to restore services at Eastbourne District General Hospital. He then took a job as business development director for West End Studios, an event and exhibition company based in Eastbourne.

In July 2016, Lloyd announced that he would seek selection as the Liberal Democrat candidate at the next general election. He attributed his change of mind to a petition created by local supporters two months before, which had asked him to stand again.

=== Return to Parliament ===
Lloyd stood at the snap general election in 2017 and won, beating the same Conservative MP who had unseated him in 2015, Caroline Ansell, by 1,609 votes. Lloyd was selected under an all-disabled shortlist, the first time any political party had restricted its selection to disabled people. In June 2017, Liberal Democrat Leader Tim Farron appointed Lloyd as the party's frontbench spokesperson for the Department for Work and Pensions. Lloyd was reappointed to this position after Sir Vince Cable was elected as Leader of the Liberal Democrats in October 2017. In January 2018, Lloyd sponsored a parliamentary debate on Universal Credit's impact on the private rented sector.

=== Local causes and campaigns ===
As well as advocating improvements to the A27, Lloyd has campaigned to retain services at the Eastbourne District General Hospital, against cuts to school budgets, and against cuts to adult social care services. Lloyd organised for hundreds of presents to be delivered to the elderly and vulnerable who were in hospital without any visitors over the 2017 Christmas period. The campaign generated a surplus of donated presents. These were delivered to elderly patients in the community over the festive period.

In 2010, Lloyd created an "MP's Commission", composed of local business and community leaders in his Eastbourne constituency. Its initiatives included: bringing back the Eastbourne 'Sunshine' Carnival; and organising a procurement conference to encourage further economic cooperation between the private sector and major public sector bodies in the town. In 2011, Lloyd developed a successful local apprenticeship initiative, aiming to recruit 100 apprenticeships in 100 days in Eastbourne. The initiative ultimately created 181 apprenticeships and received praise from then-Prime Minister David Cameron. In 2014, Lloyd was awarded the Grassroot Diplomat Initiative Honouree for this work. During the same year, Lloyd was also associated with lobbying for additional funds for local housing projects and supporting negotiations over the regeneration of Eastbourne's Arndale shopping centre.

In 2014, The Guardian reported that Lloyd's "toil has yielded high levels of recognition and support, some of it close to admiration." Christina Patterson in The Independent remarked that "a political system that can produce elected representatives like this may well be as good as it gets."

In 2015, Lloyd supported appeals made by the parents of a five-year-old girl who died in his constituency, when the child's grandparents were denied visas to enter the UK to attend her funeral. He offered to personally guarantee their return to Zimbabwe.

Lloyd successfully campaigned for an inquiry into patient deaths at Gosport War Memorial Hospital, having "long supported the case" for an independent investigation. On 20 June 2018, the Gosport Independent Panel published a report finding that "there was a disregard for human life" at the hospital and that "456 patients died where medication – opioids – had been prescribed and administered without appropriate clinical justification". In response, Lloyd called for a criminal investigation into the deaths at Gosport.

== Views ==
=== Economy ===
Lloyd has described himself as a "business-wing" liberal, in favour of light-touch regulation except in the case of investment banking. He is in favour of promoting apprenticeships as a viable career development alternative to university, suggesting the creation of a 'Royal Society of Apprentices' to improve the low perception of apprenticeships.

=== Welfare reform ===
Writing in a 2013 publication for the Liberal Democrat group Liberal Reform, Lloyd criticised both the left and the right for their attitudes to welfare, accusing the right of "boneheaded vituperation" and the left of "complacency" and of being patronising. He considers the Work Programme workfare scheme and Universal Credit introduced by the coalition government to be the liberal solution for unemployment. Although he was publicly supportive of welfare reforms, he repeatedly warned Employment Minister Chris Grayling against the use of negative language to describe the unemployed.

=== European Union ===
Lloyd voted to remain in the European Union in referendum on the United Kingdom's membership. He said that he would "respect the result" and would oppose a further referendum on the UK's membership of the European Union, contrary to his party's policy. A majority of voters (57%) in Lloyd's Eastbourne constituency voted to leave the European Union.

On 6 December 2018, Lloyd resigned the Liberal Democrat whip in Parliament over Brexit. In his resignation letter to Liberal Democrat Chief Whip Alistair Carmichael, Lloyd said "[t]hough I fought as a Remainer during the referendum...I also made a clear promise to my constituency...that I would accept the result, support the deal the PM brought back from the EU and not back calls for a second referendum...I will be keeping my word to my town...Consequently, I have decided the only honourable thing for me to do is to resign the party whip in Parliament.

Lloyd subsequently reaffirmed his commitment to remaining in the European Union on announcement of the UK general election 2019.

Parliament of the United Kingdom
Preceded by Nigel Waterson	Member of Parliament for Eastbourne; 2010–2015	Succeeded by Caroline Ansell
Preceded by Caroline Ansell	Member of Parliament for Eastbourne; 2017–2019	Succeeded by Caroline Ansell
