= Ted Lindsay (disambiguation) =

Ted Lindsay is an ice hockey player.

Ted Lindsay may also refer to:

- Ted Lindsay (politician)
- Ted Lindsay Award

== See also ==
- Theodore Lindsey
- Edward Lindsay (disambiguation)
