= Eastbourne (constituency) =

Parliamentary constituency in the United Kingdom, 1885 onwards

Coordinates: 50.78°N 0.27°E

- Borough constituency for the House of Commons
- Interactive map of boundaries from 2024
- Boundary of Eastbourne in South East England
- County: East Sussex
- Electorate: 73,322 (2023)
- Major settlements: Eastbourne

Current constituency
- Created: 1885
- Member of Parliament: Josh Babarinde (Liberal Democrats)
- Seats: One
- Created from: East Sussex

Eastbourne is a constituency for the House of Commons of the UK Parliament. It was created as one of nine in Sussex in 1885, since when it has reduced in geographic size reflecting the growth of its main settlement, Eastbourne. (Note: A borough constituency having first been the alternative form, a county constituency, for the sole modern purposes of election expenses and type of returning officer.) For the majority of its history, the constituency has been represented by Conservative MPs, but from the 1990s onwards became a marginal seat, or swing seat, and since 2024 has been represented by Josh Babarinde, a Liberal Democrat.

== Constituency profile ==
The Eastbourne constituency is located in East Sussex. It covers the large town of Eastbourne and is coterminous with its borough. Eastbourne is a seaside resort town on England's south coast and is popular with tourists. The town is known for its Victorian architecture and was mostly developed in the late 19th century by William Cavendish, 7th Duke of Devonshire. The town has high levels of deprivation, particularly in the town centre and the northern suburbs, although the west of the town is wealthy. House prices are lower than the national average and considerably lower than the rest of South East England.

Compared to the country as a whole, residents of Eastbourne are generally older and have lower levels of education. They have low incomes and are less likely to work in professional occupations. White people made up 91% of the population at the 2021 census. At the local council level, most of the town is represented by Liberal Democrats with some Conservative councillors elected in the outer suburbs. An estimated 57% of voters in Eastbourne supported leaving the European Union in the 2016 referendum, higher than the nationwide rate of 52%.

== History ==
=== Origin ===
This seat was created by the Redistribution of Seats Act 1885. This zone had been in the East Sussex constituency, which in turn had been created with two seats by the Reform Act 1832 as a division of the 13th century-founded Sussex parliamentary county which had two seats (returned two knights of the shire).

=== From safe seat to marginal seat ===
Results of all deposit-keeping candidates in their bid be the MP for Eastbourne (UK House of Commons), from 1990 to 2019 inclusive

With the exception of the landslide Liberal victory in 1906, the seat returned Conservative Party candidates at every election from its creation in 1885 until 1987. The seat in the 1930s saw three unopposed candidates: in 1932, March 1935 and November 1935. The large rural vote within the seat, until boundary changes in 1983, resulted in strong Conservative support – rural English voters tended to be richer and more right-wing (anti-socialist, pro-Empire before 1960s, pro-Established Church and pro-defence) compared to other voters.

The seat was first won by the Liberal Democrats at the 1990 by-election. Although it was recaptured by the Conservatives at the subsequent general election in 1992 and held until 2010, it became a marginal, or swing seat, from 1990 onwards, being closely fought for between the two locally dominant parties. In the nine elections from 1990 to 2019, the winning majority was never more than 10%, and the seat has changed hands between the Conservative and Liberal Democrat candidates at each of the five elections from 2010 to 2024 inclusive.

=== Recent results ===
A Liberal Democrat, Stephen Lloyd, regained the seat at the 2010 general election, beating incumbent Conservative MP Nigel Waterson who had won the previous four elections. The 2010 result saw Eastbourne return the sixth-lowest Labour share of the vote of the 631 candidates who stood at the election, with only 4.8%.

In 2015, the seat was won by Caroline Ansell by just 773 votes, making it the 9th most marginal of the Conservative Party's 331 seats, by share of the vote. Ansell held the seat from 2015 to 2017 and again from 2019 to 2024, in both cases beating Lloyd, who held it from 2010 to 2015 and again from 2017 to 2019. (Note: As with all constituencies, the constituency elects one Member of Parliament (MP) by the first past the post system of election at least every five years.)

In 2024, the seat was once again recaptured for the Liberal Democrats by Josh Babarinde, this time with a healthy majority of 26.8%. This made 2024 the first election since the constituency's creation that a Conservative candidate was not within 10% of the winning vote.

== Boundaries ==
=== Historic ===
Map of boundaries 2010–2024

1885–1918: The Corporate Towns of Pevensey and Seaford, the Sessional Divisions of Hailsham and Uckfield (except the parishes of East Hoathly and Waldron), and part of the Sessional Division of Lewes.

1918–1950: The Borough of Eastbourne, the Rural District of Eastbourne, and in the Rural District of Hailsham the parishes of Arlington, Chalvington, Chiddingly, Hailsham, Hellingly, Laughton, and Ripe.

1950–1955: The Boroughs of Eastbourne and Bexhill, and in the Rural District of Hailsham the parishes of East Dean, Friston, Hooe, Jevington, Ninfield, Pevensey, Polegate, Wartling, Westham, and Willingdon.

1955–1974: The Borough of Eastbourne, and part of the Rural District of Hailsham.

1974–1983: The Borough of Eastbourne, and in the Rural District of Hailsham the parishes of East Dean, Friston, Jevington, Pevensey, Polegate, Westdean, Westham, and Willingdon.

1983–1997: The Borough of Eastbourne, and the District of Wealden wards of Polegate North, Polegate South, and Willingdon.

1997–2010: As prior, substituting East Dean for the Polegate wards.

2010–2024: As prior, less East Dean.

=== Current ===
Further to the 2023 Periodic Review of Westminster constituencies which came into effect for the 2024 general election, the boundaries of the constituency are now coterminous with the Borough of Eastbourne.

In order to bring its electorate within the permitted range, the parts within the District of Wealden were transferred to the Lewes constituency.

== Members of Parliament ==
East Sussex prior to 1885

| Election | Member | Party |
|---|---|---|
| 1885 | Edward Field | Conservative |
| 1900 | Sir Lindsay Hogg | Conservative |
| 1906 | Hubert Beaumont | Liberal |
| January 1910 | Rupert Gwynne | Conservative |
| 1924 | Sir George Lloyd | Conservative |
| 1925 by-election | Sir Reginald Hall | Conservative |
| 1929 | Edward Marjoribanks | Conservative |
| 1932 by-election | John Slater | Conservative |
| 1935 by-election | Sir Charles Taylor | Conservative |
| February 1974 | Ian Gow | Conservative |
| 1990 by-election | David Bellotti | Liberal Democrats |
| 1992 | Nigel Waterson | Conservative |
| 2010 | Stephen Lloyd | Liberal Democrats |
| 2015 | Caroline Ansell | Conservative |
| 2017 | Stephen Lloyd | Liberal Democrats |
| December 2018 | Stephen Lloyd | Independent |
| September 2019 | Stephen Lloyd | Liberal Democrats |
| 2019 | Caroline Ansell | Conservative |
| 2024 | Josh Babarinde | Liberal Democrats |

=== By-elections ===
- 1925 Eastbourne by-election (Con, hold), following the resignation of the Conservative MP Sir George Ambrose Lloyd
- 1932 Eastbourne by-election (Con, hold), following the death of the Conservative MP Edward Marjoribanks
- 1935 Eastbourne by-election (Con, hold), following the death of the Conservative MP John Slater
- 1990 Eastbourne by-election (LD, gain), following the assassination of the Conservative MP Ian Gow by members of the Provisional IRA.

== Election results ==
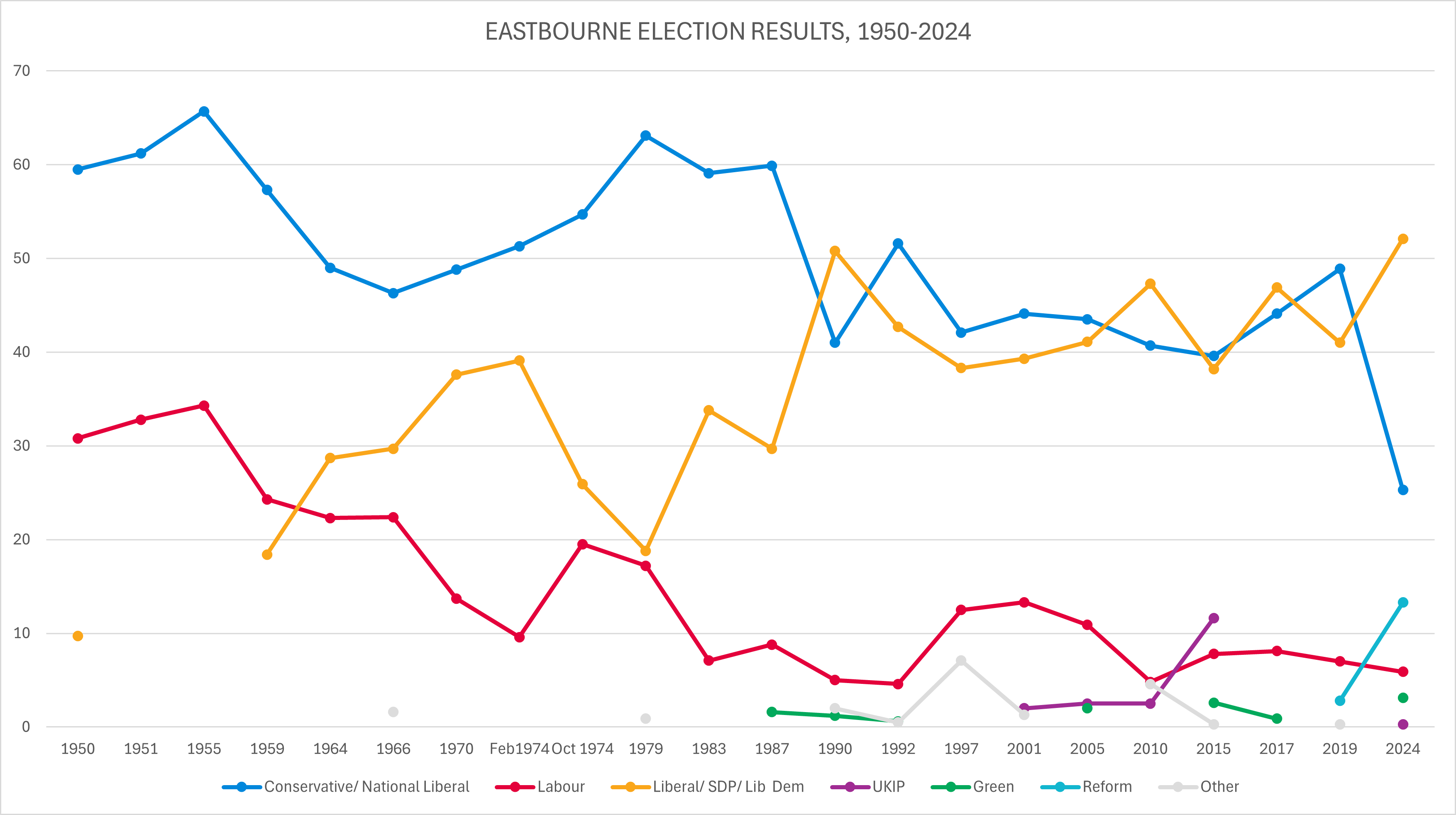
Election results 1950-2024

=== Elections in the 2020s ===
General election 2024: Eastbourne
| Party | Candidate | Votes | % | ±% |
|---|---|---|---|---|
| Liberal Democrats | Josh Babarinde | 23,742 | 52.1 | +9.2 |
| Conservative | Caroline Ansell | 11,538 | 25.3 | −21.8 |
| Reform | Mark Ashdown | 6,061 | 13.3 | +10.6 |
| Labour | Paul Richards | 2,689 | 5.9 | −1.0 |
| Green | Mike Munson | 1,421 | 3.1 | N/A |
| UKIP | Ian Garbutt | 154 | 0.3 | N/A |
| Majority | | 12,204 | 26.8 | N/A |
| Turnout | | 45,605 | 62.8 | −7.1 |
| Registered electors | | 72,592 | | |
| Liberal Democrats gain from Conservative | | Swing | +15.5 | |

=== Elections in the 2010s ===
2019 notional result
| Party | Vote | % |
|---|---|---|
| Conservative | 24,137 | 47.1 |
| Liberal Democrats | 21,969 | 42.9 |
| Labour | 3,560 | 6.9 |
| Brexit Party | 1,408 | 2.7 |
| Others | 185 | 0.4 |
| Turnout | 51,259 | 69.9 |
| Electorate | 73,322 | |

General election 2019: Eastbourne
| Party | Candidate | Votes | % | ±% |
|---|---|---|---|---|
| Conservative | Caroline Ansell | 26,951 | 48.9 | +4.8 |
| Liberal Democrats | Stephen Lloyd | 22,620 | 41.0 | −5.9 |
| Labour | Jake Lambert | 3,848 | 7.0 | −1.1 |
| Brexit Party | Stephen Gander | 1,530 | 2.8 | N/A |
| Independent | Ken Pollock | 185 | 0.3 | N/A |
| Majority | | 4,331 | 7.9 | N/A |
| Turnout | | 55,134 | 69.5 | −3.4 |
| Conservative gain from Liberal Democrats | | Swing | +5.3 | |

General election 2017: Eastbourne
| Party | Candidate | Votes | % | ±% |
|---|---|---|---|---|
| Liberal Democrats | Stephen Lloyd | 26,924 | 46.9 | +8.7 |
| Conservative | Caroline Ansell | 25,315 | 44.1 | +4.5 |
| Labour | Jake Lambert | 4,671 | 8.1 | +0.3 |
| Green | Alex Hough | 510 | 0.9 | −1.7 |
| Majority | | 1,609 | 2.8 | N/A |
| Turnout | | 57,420 | 72.9 | +5.3 |
| Liberal Democrats gain from Conservative | | Swing | +2.1 | |

General election 2015: Eastbourne
| Party | Candidate | Votes | % | ±% |
|---|---|---|---|---|
| Conservative | Caroline Ansell | 20,934 | 39.6 | −1.1 |
| Liberal Democrats | Stephen Lloyd | 20,201 | 38.2 | −9.1 |
| UKIP | Nigel Jones | 6,139 | 11.6 | +9.1 |
| Labour | Jake Lambert | 4,143 | 7.8 | +3.0 |
| Green | Andrew Durling | 1,351 | 2.6 | N/A |
| Independent | Paul Howard | 139 | 0.3 | N/A |
| Majority | | 733 | 1.4 | N/A |
| Turnout | | 52,907 | 67.6 | +0.6 |
| Conservative gain from Liberal Democrats | | Swing | +4.0 | |

General election 2010: Eastbourne
| Party | Candidate | Votes | % | ±% |
|---|---|---|---|---|
| Liberal Democrats | Stephen Lloyd | 24,658 | 47.3 | +5.6 |
| Conservative | Nigel Waterson | 21,223 | 40.7 | −2.3 |
| Labour | Dave Brinson | 2,497 | 4.8 | −6.0 |
| Independent | Stephen Shing | 1,327 | 2.5 | N/A |
| UKIP | Roger Needham | 1,305 | 2.5 | ±0.0 |
| BNP | Colin Poulter | 939 | 1.8 | N/A |
| Independent | Michael Baldry | 101 | 0.2 | N/A |
| Independent | Keith Gell | 74 | 0.1 | N/A |
| Majority | | 3,435 | 6.6 | N/A |
| Turnout | | 52,124 | 67.0 | +3.8 |
| Liberal Democrats gain from Conservative | | Swing | +4.0 | |

=== Elections in the 2000s ===
General election 2005: Eastbourne
| Party | Candidate | Votes | % | ±% |
|---|---|---|---|---|
| Conservative | Nigel Waterson | 21,033 | 43.5 | −0.6 |
| Liberal Democrats | Stephen Lloyd | 19,909 | 41.1 | +1.8 |
| Labour | Andrew Jones | 5,268 | 10.9 | −2.4 |
| UKIP | Andrew Meggs | 1,233 | 2.5 | +0.5 |
| Green | Clive Gross | 949 | 2.0 | N/A |
| Majority | | 1,124 | 2.4 | −2.4 |
| Turnout | | 48,392 | 64.8 | +5.2 |
| Conservative hold | | Swing | −1.2 | |

General election 2001: Eastbourne
| Party | Candidate | Votes | % | ±% |
|---|---|---|---|---|
| Conservative | Nigel Waterson | 19,738 | 44.1 | +2.0 |
| Liberal Democrats | Chris Berry | 17,584 | 39.3 | +1.0 |
| Labour | Gillian Roles | 5,967 | 13.3 | +0.8 |
| UKIP | Barry Jones | 907 | 2.0 | N/A |
| Liberal | Theresia Williamson | 574 | 1.3 | −0.1 |
| Majority | | 2,154 | 4.8 | +1.0 |
| Turnout | | 44,770 | 59.6 | −13.2 |
| Conservative hold | | Swing | +1.5 | |

=== Elections in the 1990s ===
General election 1997: Eastbourne
| Party | Candidate | Votes | % | ±% |
|---|---|---|---|---|
| Conservative | Nigel Waterson | 22,183 | 42.1 | −10.9 |
| Liberal Democrats | Chris Berry | 20,189 | 38.3 | −2.9 |
| Labour | David Lines | 6,576 | 12.5 | +7.8 |
| Referendum | Trevor Lowe | 2,724 | 5.2 | N/A |
| Liberal | Theresia Williamson | 741 | 1.4 | N/A |
| Natural Law | John Dawkins | 254 | 0.5 | N/A |
| Majority | | 1,994 | 3.8 | −5.1 |
| Turnout | | 52,667 | 72.8 | −8.1 |
| Conservative hold | | Swing | −4.0 | |

This constituency underwent boundary changes between the 1992 and 1997 general elections and thus change in share of vote is based on a notional calculation.

General election 1992: Eastbourne
| Party | Candidate | Votes | % | ±% |
|---|---|---|---|---|
| Conservative | Nigel Waterson | 31,792 | 51.6 | −8.3 |
| Liberal Democrats | David Bellotti | 26,311 | 42.7 | +13.0 |
| Labour | Ivan A. Gibbons | 2,834 | 4.6 | −4.2 |
| Green | David Aherne | 391 | 0.6 | −0.9 |
| Liberal | MT Williamson | 296 | 0.5 | −29.3 |
| Majority | | 5,481 | 8.9 | −21.3 |
| Turnout | | 61,624 | 80.9 | +5.3 |
| Conservative hold | | Swing | −10.7 | |

1990 Eastbourne by-election
| Party | Candidate | Votes | % | ±% |
|---|---|---|---|---|
| Liberal Democrats | David Bellotti | 23,415 | 50.8 | +21.1 |
| Conservative | Richard Hickmet | 18,865 | 41.0 | −18.9 |
| Labour | Charlotte Atkins | 2,308 | 5.0 | −3.8 |
| Green | David Aherne | 553 | 1.2 | −0.4 |
| Liberal | Theresia Williamson | 526 | 1.1 | N/A |
| Corrective Party | Lady Whiplash | 216 | 0.5 | N/A |
| National Front | John McAuley | 154 | 0.3 | N/A |
| Ironside Party | Eric Page | 35 | 0.1 | N/A |
| Majority | | 4,550 | 9.8 | N/A |
| Turnout | | 46,072 | 60.7 | −14.9 |
| Liberal Democrats gain from Conservative | | Swing | +20.0 | |

=== Elections in the 1980s ===
General election 1987: Eastbourne
| Party | Candidate | Votes | % | ±% |
|---|---|---|---|---|
| Conservative | Ian Gow | 33,587 | 59.9 | +0.8 |
| Liberal | Peter Driver | 16,664 | 29.7 | −4.1 |
| Labour | Ash Patel | 4,928 | 8.8 | +1.7 |
| Green | Ruth Addison | 867 | 1.6 | N/A |
| Majority | | 16,923 | 30.2 | +4.9 |
| Turnout | | 56,046 | 75.6 | +2.6 |
| Conservative hold | | Swing | +2.5 | |

General election 1983: Eastbourne
| Party | Candidate | Votes | % | ±% |
|---|---|---|---|---|
| Conservative | Ian Gow | 31,501 | 59.1 | −3.9 |
| Liberal | Peter Driver | 18,015 | 33.8 | +15.0 |
| Labour | Charles Clark | 3,790 | 7.1 | −10.1 |
| Majority | | 13,486 | 25.3 | −19.0 |
| Turnout | | 53,306 | 73.0 | −3.7 |
| Conservative hold | | Swing | −9.5 | |

=== Elections in the 1970s ===
General election 1979: Eastbourne
| Party | Candidate | Votes | % | ±% |
|---|---|---|---|---|
| Conservative | Ian Gow | 37,168 | 63.1 | +8.4 |
| Liberal | David Bellotti | 11,084 | 18.8 | −7.1 |
| Labour | Len Caine | 10,166 | 17.2 | −2.3 |
| National Front | C Mitchell | 533 | 0.9 | N/A |
| Majority | | 26,084 | 44.3 | +15.5 |
| Turnout | | 58,951 | 76.7 | +2.2 |
| Conservative hold | | Swing | +7.8 | |

General election October 1974: Eastbourne
| Party | Candidate | Votes | % | ±% |
|---|---|---|---|---|
| Conservative | Ian Gow | 30,442 | 54.7 | +3.6 |
| Liberal | Gurth Hoyer-Millar | 14,417 | 25.9 | −13.2 |
| Labour | Len Caine | 10,830 | 19.5 | +9.9 |
| Majority | | 16,025 | 28.8 | |
| Turnout | | 55,689 | 74.55 | |
| Conservative hold | | Swing | +8.4 | |

General election February 1974: Eastbourne
| Party | Candidate | Votes | % | ±% |
|---|---|---|---|---|
| Conservative | Ian Gow | 31,462 | 51.3 | |
| Liberal | Stephen Terrell | 23,987 | 39.1 | |
| Labour | David Dawson | 5,874 | 9.6 | |
| Majority | | 7,475 | 12.19 | |
| Turnout | | 61,323 | 82.60 | |
| Conservative hold | | Swing | | |

General election 1970: Eastbourne
| Party | Candidate | Votes | % | ±% |
|---|---|---|---|---|
| Conservative | Charles Taylor | 30,296 | 48.8 | |
| Liberal | Stephen Terrell | 23,308 | 37.6 | |
| Labour | Cyril George Abley | 8,475 | 13.7 | |
| Majority | | 6,988 | 11.2 | |
| Turnout | | 62,079 | 73.67 | |
| Conservative hold | | Swing | | |

=== Elections in the 1960s ===
General election 1966: Eastbourne
| Party | Candidate | Votes | % | ±% |
|---|---|---|---|---|
| Conservative | Charles Taylor | 26,039 | 46.26 | |
| Liberal | Stephen Terrell | 16,746 | 29.75 | |
| Labour | John Harold High | 12,620 | 22.42 | |
| Independent | Vernon Hubert Petty | 883 | 1.57 | N/A |
| Majority | | 9,293 | 16.51 | |
| Turnout | | 56,288 | 77.24 | |
| Conservative hold | | Swing | | |

General election 1964: Eastbourne
| Party | Candidate | Votes | % | ±% |
|---|---|---|---|---|
| Conservative | Charles Taylor | 26,410 | 49.01 | |
| Liberal | Stephen Terrell | 15,441 | 28.66 | |
| Labour Co-op | Joan E. M. Baker | 12,034 | 22.33 | |
| Majority | | 10,969 | 20.35 | |
| Turnout | | 53,885 | 76.70 | |
| Conservative hold | | Swing | | |

=== Elections in the 1950s ===
General election 1959: Eastbourne
| Party | Candidate | Votes | % | ±% |
|---|---|---|---|---|
| Conservative | Charles Taylor | 27,874 | 57.28 | |
| Labour | Anthony Albert Dumont | 11,837 | 24.32 | |
| Liberal | Ronald Gardner-Thorpe | 8,955 | 18.40 | N/A |
| Majority | | 16,037 | 32.96 | |
| Turnout | | 48,666 | 77.28 | |
| Conservative hold | | Swing | | |

General election 1955: Eastbourne
| Party | Candidate | Votes | % | ±% |
|---|---|---|---|---|
| Conservative | Charles Taylor | 29,779 | 65.68 | |
| Labour | John A. Lewis | 15,561 | 34.32 | |
| Majority | | 14,218 | 31.36 | |
| Turnout | | 45,340 | 75.81 | |
| Conservative hold | | Swing | | |

General election 1951: Eastbourne
| Party | Candidate | Votes | % | ±% |
|---|---|---|---|---|
| Conservative | Charles Taylor | 39,278 | 67.15 | |
| Labour | Christopher Attlee | 19,217 | 32.85 | |
| Majority | | 20,061 | 34.30 | |
| Turnout | | 58,495 | 81.93 | |
| Conservative hold | | Swing | | |

General election 1950: Eastbourne
| Party | Candidate | Votes | % | ±% |
|---|---|---|---|---|
| Conservative | Charles Taylor | 35,425 | 59.54 | |
| Labour | Reginald Groves | 18,304 | 30.77 | |
| Liberal | Cecil Herbert Louis Douglas-Bate | 5,766 | 9.69 | |
| Majority | | 17,121 | 28.77 | |
| Turnout | | 59,495 | 85.08 | |
| Conservative hold | | Swing | | |

=== Election in the 1940s ===
General election 1945: Eastbourne
| Party | Candidate | Votes | % | ±% |
|---|---|---|---|---|
| Conservative | Charles Taylor | 18,173 | 53.24 | N/A |
| Labour | Duncan Newman Smith | 12,637 | 37.02 | N/A |
| Liberal | John Stafford Gowland | 2,797 | 8.19 | N/A |
| Independent National | Reg Hipwell | 524 | 1.54 | N/A |
| Majority | | 5,536 | 16.22 | N/A |
| Turnout | | 34,131 | 77.35 | N/A |
| Conservative hold | | Swing | N/A | |

=== Elections in the 1930s ===
General election 1935: Eastbourne
| Party | Candidate | Votes | % | ±% |
|---|---|---|---|---|
| Conservative | Charles Taylor | Unopposed | | |
| Conservative hold | | | | |

1935 Eastbourne by-election
| Party | Candidate | Votes | % | ±% |
|---|---|---|---|---|
| Conservative | Charles Taylor | Unopposed | | |
| Conservative hold | | | | |

1932 Eastbourne by-election
| Party | Candidate | Votes | % | ±% |
|---|---|---|---|---|
| Conservative | John Slater | Unopposed | | |
| Conservative hold | | | | |

General election 1931: Eastbourne
| Party | Candidate | Votes | % | ±% |
|---|---|---|---|---|
| Conservative | Edward Marjoribanks | 31,240 | 85.31 | |
| Labour | A.J. Marshall | 5,379 | 14.69 | |
| Majority | | 25,861 | 70.62 | |
| Turnout | | 36,619 | 71.86 | |
| Conservative hold | | Swing | | |

=== Elections in the 1920s ===
General election 1929: Eastbourne
| Party | Candidate | Votes | % | ±% |
|---|---|---|---|---|
| Unionist | Edward Marjoribanks | 18,157 | 49.9 | −8.5 |
| Labour | Richard S Chatfield | 8,204 | 22.5 | +5.6 |
| Liberal | Clive Stuart Saxon Burt | 7,812 | 21.4 | −3.3 |
| Ind. Unionist | P E Hurst | 2,277 | 6.2 | N/A |
| Majority | | 9,953 | 27.4 | −6.3 |
| Turnout | | 36,450 | 74.5 | +13.7 |
| Unionist hold | | Swing | −7.0 | |

1925 Eastbourne by-election
| Party | Candidate | Votes | % | ±% |
|---|---|---|---|---|
| Unionist | Reginald Hall | 12,741 | 58.4 | −9.5 |
| Liberal | Harcourt Johnstone | 5,386 | 24.7 | +8.6 |
| Labour | Thomas Williams | 3,696 | 16.9 | +0.9 |
| Majority | | 7,355 | 33.7 | −18.1 |
| Turnout | | 21,823 | 60.7 | −14.9 |
| Unionist hold | | Swing | −9.0 | |

General election 1924: Eastbourne
| Party | Candidate | Votes | % | ±% |
|---|---|---|---|---|
| Unionist | George Lloyd | 17,533 | 67.9 | +14.1 |
| Liberal | Joseph James Davies | 4,168 | 16.1 | −30.1 |
| Labour | D J Davis | 4,138 | 16.0 | N/A |
| Majority | | 13,365 | 51.8 | +44.2 |
| Turnout | | 25,839 | 77.6 | +0.6 |
| Unionist hold | | Swing | +22.1 | |

General election 1923: Eastbourne
| Party | Candidate | Votes | % | ±% |
|---|---|---|---|---|
| Unionist | Rupert Gwynne | 13,276 | 53.8 | −6.7 |
| Liberal | Thomas Wiles | 11,396 | 46.2 | +6.7 |
| Majority | | 1,880 | 7.6 | −13.4 |
| Turnout | | 24,672 | 77.0 | −0.2 |
| Unionist hold | | Swing | −6.7 | |

General election 1922: Eastbourne
| Party | Candidate | Votes | % | ±% |
|---|---|---|---|---|
| Unionist | Rupert Gwynne | 14,601 | 60.5 | −3.1 |
| Liberal | Edward Duke | 9,550 | 39.5 | +29.1 |
| Majority | | 5,051 | 21.0 | −16.6 |
| Turnout | | 24,151 | 77.2 | |
| Unionist hold | | Swing | −16.1 | |

=== Elections in the 1910s ===
Gwynne

General election 1918: Eastbourne
| Party | | Candidate | Votes | % | ±% |
|---|---|---|---|---|---|
| C | Unionist | Rupert Gwynne | 11,357 | 63.6 | +5.3 |
| | Labour | Thomas Burleigh Hasdell | 4,641 | 26.0 | N/A |
| | Liberal | Alfred John Callaghan | 1,852 | 10.4 | −31.3 |
| Majority | | | 6,716 | 37.6 | +21.0 |
| Turnout | | | 17,850 | 59.8 | −23.4 |
| | Unionist hold | | Swing | +18.3 | |
C indicates candidate endorsed by the coalition government.

General Election 1914–15:

Another General Election was required to take place before the end of 1915. The political parties had been making preparations for an election to take place and by July 1914, the following candidates had been selected;

- Unionist: Rupert Gwynne
- Liberal:

Morison

General election December 1910: Eastbourne
| Party | Candidate | Votes | % | ±% |
|---|---|---|---|---|
| Conservative | Rupert Gwynne | 6,873 | 58.3 | −0.7 |
| Liberal | Hector Morison | 4,920 | 41.7 | +0.7 |
| Majority | | 1,953 | 16.6 | −1.4 |
| Turnout | | 11,793 | 83.2 | −7.1 |
| Registered electors | | 14,172 | | |
| Conservative hold | | Swing | −0.7 | |

General election January 1910: Eastbourne
| Party | Candidate | Votes | % | ±% |
|---|---|---|---|---|
| Conservative | Rupert Gwynne | 7,553 | 59.0 | +11.8 |
| Liberal | Hector Morison | 5,249 | 41.0 | −11.8 |
| Majority | | 2,304 | 18.0 | N/A |
| Turnout | | 12,802 | 90.3 | +3.3 |
| Registered electors | | 14,172 | | |
| Conservative gain from Liberal | | Swing | +11.8 | |

=== Elections in the 1900s ===
Beaumont

General election 1906: Eastbourne
| Party | Candidate | Votes | % | ±% |
|---|---|---|---|---|
| Liberal | Hubert Beaumont | 5,933 | 52.8 | +6.6 |
| Conservative | Lindsay Hogg | 5,303 | 47.2 | −6.6 |
| Majority | | 630 | 5.6 | N/A |
| Turnout | | 11,236 | 87.0 | +5.2 |
| Registered electors | | 12,913 | | |
| Liberal gain from Conservative | | Swing | +6.6 | |

General election 1900: Eastbourne
| Party | Candidate | Votes | % | ±% |
|---|---|---|---|---|
| Conservative | Lindsay Hogg | 4,948 | 53.8 | +3.4 |
| Liberal | Thomas Seymour Brand | 4,254 | 46.2 | −3.4 |
| Majority | | 694 | 7.6 | +6.8 |
| Turnout | | 9,202 | 81.8 | +4.0 |
| Registered electors | | 11,248 | | |
| Conservative hold | | Swing | +3.4 | |

=== Elections in the 1890s ===
General election 1895: Eastbourne
| Party | Candidate | Votes | % | ±% |
|---|---|---|---|---|
| Conservative | Edward Field | 4,139 | 50.4 | −2.0 |
| Liberal | Thomas Seymour Brand | 4,079 | 49.6 | +2.0 |
| Majority | | 60 | 0.8 | −4.0 |
| Turnout | | 8,218 | 77.8 | +0.9 |
| Registered electors | | 10,563 | | |
| Conservative hold | | Swing | −2.0 | |

General election 1892: Eastbourne
| Party | Candidate | Votes | % | ±% |
|---|---|---|---|---|
| Conservative | Edward Field | 4,037 | 52.4 | −7.7 |
| Liberal | Thomas Seymour Brand | 3,674 | 47.6 | +7.7 |
| Majority | | 363 | 4.8 | −15.4 |
| Turnout | | 7,711 | 76.9 | +3.3 |
| Registered electors | | 10,029 | | |
| Conservative hold | | Swing | −7.7 | |

=== Elections in the 1880s ===
General election 1886: Eastbourne
| Party | Candidate | Votes | % | ±% |
|---|---|---|---|---|
| Conservative | Edward Field | 3,760 | 60.1 | +9.6 |
| Liberal | James Clifton Brown | 2,501 | 39.9 | −9.6 |
| Majority | | 1,259 | 20.2 | +19.2 |
| Turnout | | 6,261 | 73.6 | −9.4 |
| Registered electors | | 8,504 | | |
| Conservative hold | | Swing | +9.6 | |

General election 1885: Eastbourne
| Party | Candidate | Votes | % |
|---|---|---|---|
| Conservative | Edward Field | 3,561 | 50.5 |
| Liberal | George Wallis | 3,497 | 49.5 |
| Majority | | 64 | 1.0 |
| Turnout | | 7,058 | 83.0 |
| Registered electors | | 8,504 | |
| Conservative win (new seat) | | | |

== See also ==
- List of parliamentary constituencies in East Sussex
- List of parliamentary constituencies in the South East England (region)
- Boundary Commissions (United Kingdom)
- Sixth Periodic Review of Westminster constituencies

== Sources ==
- Election result, 2005 (BBC)
- Election results, 1997–2001 (BBC)
- Election results, 1997–2001 (Election Demon)
- Election results, 1983–1992
- Election results, 1992–2005 (Guardian)
- Election results, 1950–2001 (Keele University)
- The Times House of Commons 1945. 1945.
- Iain Dale, ed. (2003). The Times House of Commons 1929, 1931, 1935. Politico's (reprint). ISBN 1-84275-033-X.
- Craig, F. W. S. (1983) [1969]. British parliamentary election results 1918–1949 (3rd ed.). Chichester: Parliamentary Research Services. ISBN 0-900178-06-X.
