= Sir Anthony Lindsay-Hogg, 2nd Baronet =

Royal Air Force Officer

Squadron Leader Sir Anthony Henry Lindsay-Hogg, 2nd Baronet (1 May 1908 – 31 October 1968) was a British Royal Air Force officer.

== Early life ==
Lindsay-Hogg was born on 1 May 1908. He was the eldest son of William Lindsay-Hogg and Nora Cicely Barrow. His younger brother was the playwright and author Edward William Lindsay-Hogg.

His paternal grandparents were Sir Lindsay Lindsay-Hogg, 1st Baronet, and Alice Margaret Emma Cowley (a granddaughter of Sir William Baynes, 2nd Baronet). His maternal grandfather was John James Barrow, who lived at Dornoch, Scotland and at Holmwood, Tunbridge Wells, Kent.

== Personal life ==
Upon the death of his grandfather, Lindsay Lindsay-Hogg, on 2 November 1923, he succeeded as the 2nd Baronet Hogg, of Rotherfield Hall, Rotherfield, County of Sussex.

Lindsay-Hogg fought in World War II, reaching the rank of Squadron Leader in the Royal Air Force. During the War, he served as Aide-de-Camp to the Governor of Trinidad and Tobago, Sir Bede Clifford, between 1942 and 1943.

== Personal life ==
On 16 December 1929, he married Canadian-born actress Frances Mary Hyde Doble (1902–1969), daughter of Arthur Richard Doble, a wealthy Canadian banker. Her sister, Georgia Doble, Lady Sitwell, was the wife of English writer, Sir Sacheverell Sitwell, 6th Baronet, of Renishaw Hall. Before their divorce in 1934, they were the parents of a son:

- Sir William Lindsay Lindsay-Hogg, 3rd Baronet (1930–1987), who married Victoria Pares, daughter of John Pares, in 1961. They divorced in 1967 and he married Marie Teresa (née Foster) Aldiss, daughter of John Foster and widow of Dr. Peter V. Aldiss, in 1987.

Sir Anthony died on 31 October 1968 at age 60. He was succeeded in the baronetcy by his only son, William. As his son died without male issue, the baronetcy passed to his uncle, the 2nd Baronet's younger brother, Edward.

=== Descendants ===
Through his only child William, he was a grandfather of Sarah Frances Lindsay-Hogg (b. 1961), who married Simon John Gatliff in 1982.

Baronetage of the United Kingdom
Preceded by Lindsay Lindsay-Hogg	Baronet (of Rotherfield Hall); 1923–1968	Succeeded by William Lindsay Lindsay-Hogg
