= Lindsay Lindsay-Hogg =

British politician

Sir Lindsay Lindsay-Hogg, Bt JP

Member of Parliament for Eastbourne
- In office 1900–1906
- Preceded by: Edward Field
- Succeeded by: Hubert Beaumont

Personal details
- Born: Lindsay Hogg; 10 March 1853
- Died: 25 November 1923 (aged 70)
- Party: Conservative
- Spouse: Alice Margaret Emma Cowley (m. 1880; died 1923)
- Children: 4
- Parent(s): William Hogg; Eliza Susannah Hickson
- Education: Harrow School

Sir Lindsay Lindsay-Hogg, 1st Baronet JP (10 March 1853 – 25 November 1923) was a British horse breeder and member of parliament for Eastbourne from 1900 to 1906.

== Early life ==
Born Lindsay Hogg on 10 March 1853, he was the son of William Hogg, the Hanseatic Consul to Shanghai, and Eliza Susannah, née Hickson.

His paternal grandparents were Henry Hogg of Davenshaw House, Congleton, Cheshire, and his wife Charlotte, née Coppinger. His maternal grandfather was George Hickson of Chigwell, Essex.

He was educated at Harrow School.

== Career ==
Lindsay-Hogg was elected as a Conservative Member of Parliament (MP) for Eastbourne at the 1900 general election, and held the seat until his defeat at the 1906 general election, after which he did not stand for Parliament again.

He was awarded a baronetcy for his services to breeding light horses on 22 December 1905. He lived at Rotherfield Hall, Jarvis Brook in the Weald, Sussex. He was also president of Crufts.

He assumed the additional name of Lindsay before that of Hogg by Royal Licence on 6 January 1906.

== Personal life ==
On 12 October 1880, he married Alice Margaret Emma Cowley (c. 1856–1952), daughter of John Christian Cowley and Julia (née Baynes) Cowley (a daughter of Sir William Baynes, 2nd Baronet). Together, they were the parents of:

- William Lindsay-Hogg (1882–1918), a twin who married Nora Cicely Barrow, daughter of John James Barrow, in 1907.
- Alice Violet Lindsay-Hogg (1882–1965), a twin who married Capt. Hugh Brodie Cardwell, son of Col. William Alexander Cardwell and brother of Cicely Ethel Wilkinson, in 1903.
- Edith Vera Lindsay-Hogg (1889–1912), who married Capt. Lancelot Mellish Fane Gladwin, son of Hamilton Fane Gladwin, High Sheriff of Gloucestershire, in 1908.
- Cecily Lindsay-Hogg (b. 1898), who married Lt.-Col. Eden George Wallace in 1918.

As his only son predeceased him, he was succeeded by his son William's two sons, Anthony (1908–1968), who became the second baronet on his grandfather's death in 1923, and Edward (1910–1999), who became the fourth baronet in 1987 after the death of his brother Anthony's son William (1930–87), the third baronet.

=== Involvement with John Bodkin Adams ===
Lady Lindsay-Hogg was attended in her old age by society doctor and suspected serial killer John Bodkin Adams, who signed her death certificate as "Scirrhus carcinoma of the breast" when she died aged 96 on 23 August 1952. Her name came up during the 1956 investigation into Adams' methods, when nurse Gertrude Brady, who looked after Lady Lindsay-Hogg in 1950–1951, told police how she had been asked by Anthony Lindsay-Hogg to help get Lady Lindsay-Hogg's signature for a legal document. Brady had been worried by this since in her view Lady Lindsay-Hogg was "senile" and "confused". Adams witnessed Lady Lindsay-Hogg's signature and must "have known this as well". Adams was later tried for the murder of Edith Alice Morrell in 1957 but acquitted, though police suspected him of a total of 163 murders.

== Arms ==
Coat of arms of Lindsay Lindsay-Hogg
Crest Issuant from a mural crown argent a boar's head erect sable, holding in the mouth a sprig of oak fructed proper. Escutcheon Per pale indented vert and azure, on a bend or three boar's heads couped sable.

== See also ==
- Lindsay-Hogg Baronets

Parliament of the United Kingdom
Preceded by Edward Field	Member of Parliament for Eastbourne; 1900–1906	Succeeded by Hubert Beaumont
Baronetage of the United Kingdom
New creation	Baronet (of Rotherfield Hall); 1905–1923	Succeeded by Anthony Lindsay-Hogg
