= Dark Red Roses =

1929 British film by Sinclair Hill

- Theatrical release poster
- Directed by: Sinclair Hill
- Written by: Leslie Howard Gordon from a short story by Stacy Aumonier
- Starring: Stewart Rome; Frances Doble; Hugh Eden; Kate Cutler; Jack Clayton
- Cinematography: Arpad Viragh
- Edited by: E. R. Richards
- Production company: British Talking Pictures
- Release date: 1929
- Running time: 67 minutes
- Country: United Kingdom
- Language: English

Dark Red Roses is a 1929 British all-talking sound film directed by Sinclair Hill and starring Stewart Rome, Frances Doble and Hugh Eden. It was written by Leslie Howard Gordon from a short story by Stacy Aumonier. The soundtrack was recorded using the phonofilm sound-on-film process. The film includes a sequence featuring the Ballets Russes choreographed by George Balanchine.

== Plot ==
David Cardew is a sculptor who is jealous of Anton Falk, a musician, whom David's wife, Laura, admires. When David accuses Laura of having an affair with Anton, she is so furious that she does not deny it. When she asks David to take a cast of Anton's beautiful hands, David remembers a ballet where an outraged husband severs his wife's lover's hands. He embeds Anton's hands in plaster and tells him he is going to cut them off. Anton nearly faints with shock, but David releases him with a warning not to come to the house again. Later David overhears his wife telling her mother how dearly she loves him, and is ashamed of his actions.

== Cast ==
- Stewart Rome as David Cardew
- Frances Doble as Laura Cardew
- Hugh Eden as Anton Falk
- Kate Cutler as mother
- Jack Clayton as Jack
- Jill Clayton as Jill
- Sydney Morgan as Tim
- Una O'Connor as Mrs Weaks
- George Balanchine, Anton Dolin and Lydia Lopokova as the dancers

== Music ==
The film features a theme song entitled "Dark Red Roses" by T. Barry (words) and Philip Braham (music). Also featured on the soundtrack is a song entitled "The Persian Dance" by Modest Mussorgsky.

== Reception ==
Film Weekly wrote: "Although there is such an array of excellent talent Dark Red Roses cannot be called an entirely satisfactory film. It has moments of great beauty, moments of sincere feeling, but it suffers from a weak and illogical story, while, at points where it is most needed, the direction of Sinclair Hill fails to convince. Mr. Hill is at his best in scenes with the children, but his sense of dramatic values needs polishing up. Dark Red Roses is the first full-length talking film to be made at Wembley by British Sound Film Productions."

Kine Weekly wrote: "It is excellently acted and directed, and contains a diversity of interests besides the plot, including ballet, child interest, and theme song. Recording is some of the best we have heard. ... In achieving the atmosphere of domestic felicity with which the picture opens, Sinclair Hill has scored a distinct triumph. It is altogether pleasing and satisfying in its effect."

The Daily Film Renter wrote: "Stewart Rome gives a very clever study of the part of the jealous husband, David; and Frances Doble is splendid as the wife. ... As the children, Jack and Jill, Jack and Jill Clayton are thoroughly at home. It is noteworthy they are the first children to appear in a British-made talkie."

== See also ==
- List of early sound feature films (1926–1929)
