= Lindsay-Hogg baronets =

Baronetcy in the Baronetage of the United Kingdom

- Escutcheon of the Lindsay-Hogg baronets, of Rotherfield Hall Blazon: Arms: Per pale indented vert and azure, on a bend or three boar's heads couped sable.; Crest: Issuant from a mural crown argent a boar's head erect sable, holding in the mouth a sprig of oak fructed proper.
- Creation date: 1905
- Status: dormant

The Hogg, later Lindsay-Hogg, baronetcy, of Rotherfield Hall in Rotherfield in the County of Sussex, is a title in the Baronetage of the United Kingdom. It was created on 22 December 1905 for Lindsay Hogg, Conservative Member of Parliament for Eastbourne from 1900 to 1906. He assumed by Royal licence the additional surname of Lindsay before that of Hogg in 1906.

He was succeeded by his son William's two sons, Anthony (1908–1968), who became the second baronet on his grandfather's death in 1923, and Edward (1910–1999), who became the fourth baronet in 1987 after the death of his brother Anthony's son William (1930–1987), the third baronet.

The fourth baronet married the actress Geraldine Fitzgerald. Their only child, actor-director Michael Lindsay-Hogg, succeeded in 1999.

== Hogg, later Lindsay-Hogg, baronets, of Rotherfield Hall (1905) ==
- Sir Lindsay Lindsay-Hogg, 1st Baronet (1853–1923)
- Sir Anthony Henry Lindsay-Hogg, 2nd Baronet (1908–1968)
- Sir William Lindsay Lindsay-Hogg, 3rd Baronet (1930–1987)
- Sir Edward William Lindsay-Hogg, 4th Baronet (1910–1999)
- Sir Michael Edward Lindsay-Hogg, 5th Baronet (born 1940). He has not established a claim to the title; and has no heir.

Baronetage of the United Kingdom
Preceded by Hare baronets	Hogg baronets of Rotherfield Hall; 23 December 1905	Succeeded by Hulton baronets
