= John Slater (British politician) =

British politician (1889–1935)

Member of Parliament for Eastbourne
- In office 28 April 1932 – 15 February 1935
- Preceded by: Edward Marjoribanks
- Succeeded by: Charles Taylor

Personal details
- Born: 6 April 1889
- Died: 15 February 1935 (aged 45)
- Party: Conservative

John Slater (6 April 1889 – 15 February 1935) was a British Conservative Party politician.

== Football career ==
Reared in the Lancashire coal district, as a footballer Slater first lined out with Adlington White Star before signing for Bolton Wanderers aged 16. A full back, he was a member of the Trotters side which captured the Second Division title for the 1908–09 season and went on to play in the top flight for a number of years before joining South Liverpool in 1914. In 1921, he became majority shareholder in Stoke City and his investment helped the club win promotion to the First Division, but a series of relegations followed. In 1926 facing mounting financial losses, Slater agreed to dispose of his interest in the club after the failure of a proposed merger between Stoke City and Port Vale.

== Business career ==
In tandem with his sporting career Slater started work as a colliery clerk. In 1909 he became a partner in his father-in-law's coal firm. A decade later he had expanded his interests into shipbuilding, brickworks and fisheries. Having purchased Amalgamated Industrials from Clarence Harty for £5,000,000 in 1919, he sustained large losses when the company failed five years later but managed to retain several businesses and a large fortune.

== Political career ==
In 1932, Slater was elected as Member of Parliament (MP) for Eastbourne in East Sussex, in an unopposed by-election on 29 March following the death of Conservative MP Edward Marjoribanks.

Slater held the seat for less than three years, dying in office on 15 February 1935, aged 45. At the resulting 1935 Eastbourne by-election, the Conservative candidate Charles Taylor was returned unopposed.

Parliament of the United Kingdom
Preceded by Edward Marjoribanks	Member of Parliament for Eastbourne; 1932–1935	Succeeded by Charles Taylor
