= Frances Doble =

Canadian-born actress (1902–1969)

Doble, 1930s

Frances Mary Hyde Doble (1902 – 12 December 1969) was a Canadian-born actress, who had a short career on the West End stage in the 1920s and 1930s.

== Life and career ==
=== Early years ===
Doble was born in Montréal, Québec, the elder daughter of Arthur Richard Doble. She was educated in Montreal and at Bennett College, New York. She made her first appearance on stage at the Garrick Theatre, London in March 1922 playing Hélène in Seymour Hicks's farce The Man in Dress Clothes. She then joined the Birmingham Repertory Company in January, 1923, and remained there for fifteen months, playing, among other parts, Lady Mabel in The Cassilis Engagement, and Dora in Diplomacy, Patricia Carleon in Magic, also playing in The Romantic Age, The Return of the Prodigal, and The Importance of Being Earnest. In March 1924, still with the Birmingham company, she appeared at the Royal Court Theatre, London as Ecrasia in As Far as Thought Can Reach (in the Back to Methuselah cycle) and Mrs Tudor in The Farmer's Wifeby Eden Phillpotts.

After two West End engagements, playing Sophie in Guy Bolton's Polly Preferred and then Diana Armytage in a period drama In the Snare, she went on tour with Owen Nares in late 1924, playing Dora in Victorien Sardou's Diplomacy, taking over the role from Gladys Cooper. The following year she toured with Arthur Bourchier, playing Lady Brigit Mead in a dramatisation of Bettina Riddle von Hutten's novel The Halo.

=== West End and film ===
The rest of Doble's short stage career was in London. Between December 1925 and November 1927 she had leading roles in four West End plays and played in revue for the first time, in Vaudeville Vanities. In 1927 a theatrical event took place in which her most celebrated contribution came after the final curtain. She played the heroine in Noël Coward's Sirocco, a play that provoked the first-night audience to a frenzy of booing and catcalls, aimed at the author rather than the cast. Seeking to calm the audience Doble stepped forward and tried to make a speech. She unwisely stuck with the words she had written in anticipation of a great success, and when she began, "Ladies and gentlemen, this is the happiest day of my life," pandemonium ensued. The play closed within a month and Doble joined the cast of an undemanding new comedy-thriller, The Black Spider, an undistinguished piece of which the critic in The Times thought she was the redeeming feature.

During 1928 Doble played Laura Simmons in Young Woodley and Florence Churchill In the first revival of The Constant Nymph opposite Raymond Massey who was succeeding Coward and John Gielgud as Lewis Dodd. In December 1929 she married Sir Anthony Lindsay-Hogg, 2nd Baronet. They had one son, and divorced in 1934.

In 1932 Doble played Lady Cattering in Anthony Kimmins's comedy While Parents Sleep, in which she had a disrobing scene thought very daring at the time. The following year she essayed management for the only time, appearing at the Gaiety Theatre in her own production of Ballerina, a mix of drama, ballet and musical comedy. It ran for less than a month and was replaced by a revival of Charley's Aunt in which she did not appear.

In addition to her stage career, Doble made several films, beginning in 1928 with The Vortex, and The Constant Nymph in both of which she appeared with Novello more successfully than in Sirocco. Other films were Dark Red Roses (1929), The Water Gipsies and Nine till Six (both 1932).

Doble played Lady Loddon in Libel!, a courtroom drama, at the Playhouse Theatre in April 1934. The play was the young Alec Guinness's first stage appearance and Doble's last. Looking back at her career, The Times commented that anyone who saw her in Libel! would remember "the grace, the feminine aplomb, and the model-like assurance with which, called on to give evidence, she rose, crossed the stage, and silently took her stand in the witness box".

After Libel! Doble retired happily from the stage. Asked some years later if she missed the theatre, she answered, "No. If ever I pass a stage-door in the evening I suppose I'm glad that I don't still have to go in." She lived in Chelsea, and died in London on 12 December 1969 aged 67.

=== Personal life ===
Lady Lindsay-Hogg's marriage having ended in divorce in 1934, she spent some time in Spain in the late 1930s, during the Spanish Civil War, in areas controlled by the Nationalist forces under Franco, whom Lady Lindsay-Hogg, a Royalist, supported. She retained the use of her title, and embarked on an affair with the decade-younger Kim Philby, who was at the time posing as a pro-Franco and pro-German journalist; they travelled together through Spain in 1939.

== Notes and sources ==
=== Sources ===
- Parker, John, ed. (1939). Who's Who in the Theatre (ninth ed.). London: Sir Isaac Pitman and Sons. OCLC 465772389.
