= 1925 Eastbourne by-election =

UK parliamentary by-election

The 1925 Eastbourne by-election was a parliamentary by-election for the British House of Commons constituency of Eastbourne, Sussex on 17 June 1925.

== Vacancy ==
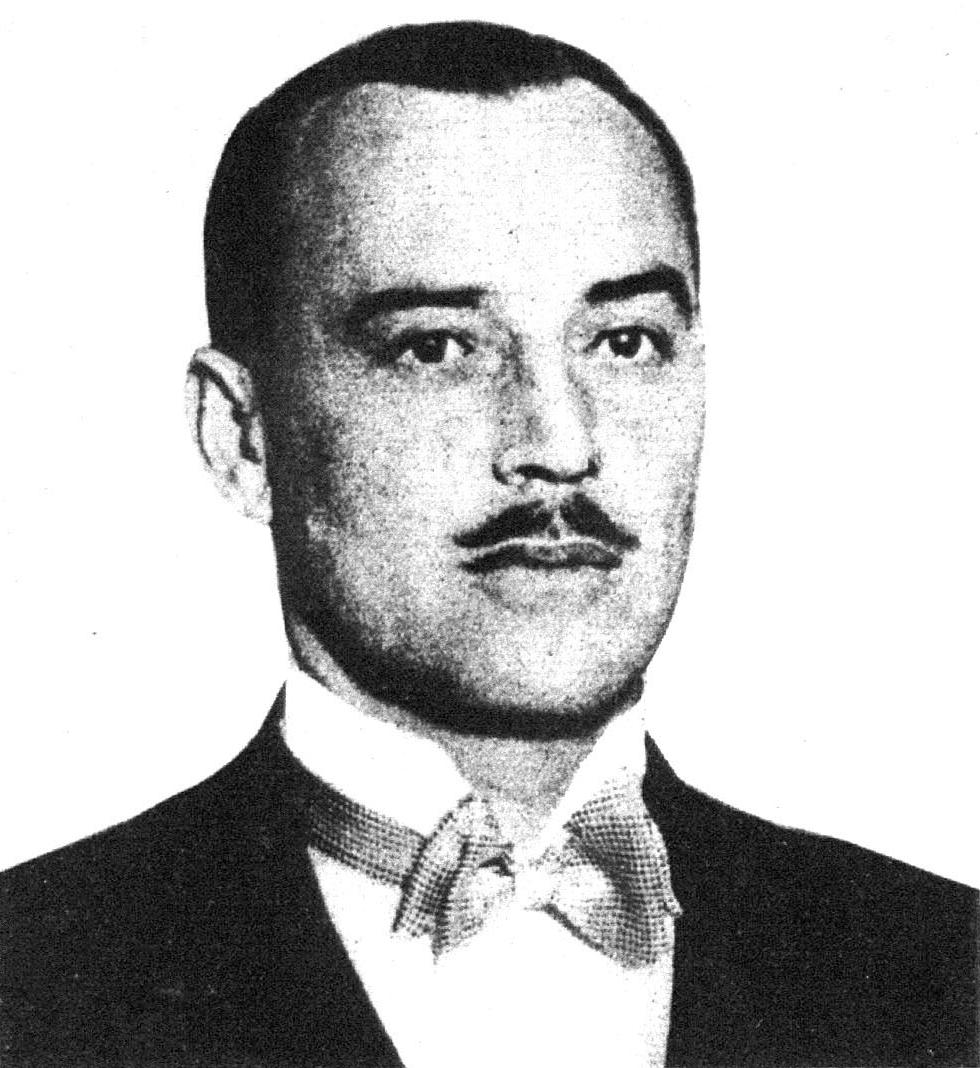
Sir George Lloyd

The by-election was caused by the resignation on 25 May of the town's Unionist Party Member of Parliament (MP) Rt Hon. Sir George Lloyd, who was elevated to the peerage as Baron Lloyd and appointed as British High Commissioner in Egypt and the Sudan. He had held the seat since the 1924 general election, having previously been MP for West Staffordshire from 1910 to 1918.

== Election history ==
The constituency was created in 1885 and had been won by a Unionist candidate at every election apart from 1906, the year of the Liberal landslide when it was won by a Liberal candidate. The result at the last General Election was

1924 general election: Eastbourne Electorate 33,318
Party	Candidate	Votes	%	±%
Unionist	George Lloyd	17,533	67.9	+14.1
Liberal	J J Davies	4,168	16.1	−30.1
Labour	D J Davis	4,138	16.0	N/A
Majority		13,365	51.8	+44.2
Turnout		25,839	77.6	+0.6
Unionist hold		Swing	+22.1	

== Candidates ==
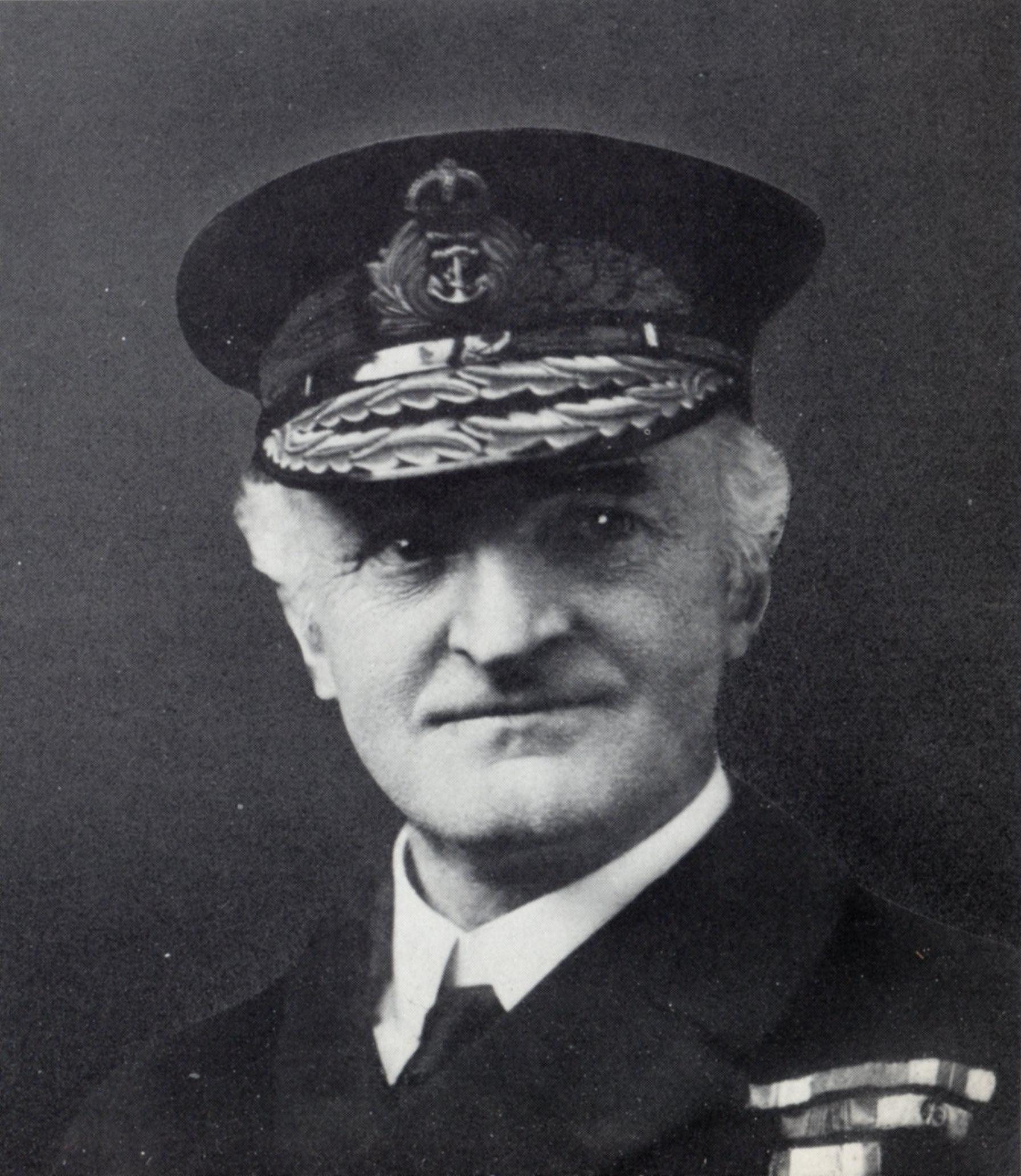
Sir Reginald Hall

- On the 24 May, the Eastbourne Unionist Association chose 55-year-old Vice-Admiral Sir Reginald 'Blinker' Hall as their candidate to defend the seat. He had been the Director of Naval Intelligence (DNI) from 1914 to 1919 and the MP for Liverpool West Derby from 1919 to 1923 when he was defeated by the Liberal candidate. He did not contest the 1924 general election.
- On 29 May, the Eastbourne Liberal Association adopted 30-year-old Harcourt 'Crinks' Johnstone as their candidate to challenge for the seat. He had been MP for Willesden East from 1923 to 1924. He first stood for parliament at Willesden East for the Liberals at the general election of 1922. However the sitting Tory MP, resigned in 1923 causing the 1923 Willesden East by-election. Johnstone was again chosen to contest the seat for the Liberals and won by a majority of 5,176 votes over the Unionist. Johnstone held the seat in the 1923 general election, only to lose it to the Unionist at the 1924 general election.
- The Eastbourne Constituency Labour Party selected 48-year-old Lt-Col. Beauchamp Williams as their candidate to challenge for the seat. He had been MP for Kennington from 1923 to 1924. He was defeated at the next general, election in October 1924 by the Unionist candidate.

All three candidates were former MPs seeking a new seat.

== Campaign ==
Polling Day was set for 17 June 1925. From the outset, the Unionists were expected to hold the seat. The main interest would focus on the battle for second place.

On the eve of poll, Johnstone received a telegram of support from leading Liberal David Lloyd George. Lloyd George had visited the constituency earlier in the campaign to speak for Johnstone.

At the end of the campaign, the Unionist team were predicting a majority of 6,000

== Result ==
Hall managed to hold onto the seat for the Unionists but with a much reduced majority. The Liberals comfortably beat Labour to finish in second place.

1925 Eastbourne by-election Electorate 33,318
Party	Candidate	Votes	%	±%
Unionist	Reginald Hall	12,741	58.4	−9.5
Liberal	Harcourt Johnstone	5,386	24.7	+8.6
Labour	Thomas Williams	3,696	16.9	+0.9
Majority		7,355	33.7	−18.1
Turnout		21,823	60.7	−14.9
Unionist hold		Swing	-9.0	

After a very disappointing 1924 general election, this was the first sign of a Liberal Party revival in the polls.

== Aftermath ==
Hall was replaced as Unionist candidate for the next General Election which the Unionists retained with a new candidate. In fact all the candidates fighting Eastbourne for the first time. The result at the following General Election;

1929 general election: Eastbourne Electorate 48,951
Party	Candidate	Votes	%	±%
Unionist	Edward Marjoribanks	18,157	49.9	−8.5
Labour	R S Chatfield	8,204	22.5	+5.6
Liberal	Clive Stuart Saxon Burt	7,812	21.4	−3.3
Ind. Unionist	P E Hurst	2,277	6.2	N/A
Majority		9,953	27.4	−6.3
Turnout		36,450	74.5	+13.7
Unionist hold		Swing	-7.0	

Johnstone sought entrance to parliament next at the 1927 Westbury by-election again finishing second. Williams did not stand for parliament again.

== See also ==
- List of United Kingdom by-elections
- United Kingdom by-election records
- Eastbourne constituency
- 1932 Eastbourne by-election
- 1935 Eastbourne by-election
- 1990 Eastbourne by-election
