= William Kirwan-Taylor =

England international rugby union player (1905-1994)

William Kirwan-Taylor OBE
- Full name: William John Kirwan-Taylor
- Born: 29 June 1905 Sutton, Surrey, England
- Died: 28 August 1994 (aged 89) Lausanne, Switzerland
- University: Trinity College, Cambridge
- Notable relative(s): Alfred Suenson-Taylor (brother); Charles Taylor (brother); Edward Mountain (grandson)
- Occupation: Surveyor

Rugby union career
- Position: Wing
International career
Years	Team	Apps	(Points)
1928	England	5	(6)
- Military career
- Allegiance: United Kingdom
- Branch: British Army
- Rank: Lieutenant colonel
- Unit: Rifle Brigade
- Conflicts: World War II

Lieutenant colonel William John Kirwan-Taylor (29 June 1905 – 28 August 1994), also known as John Taylor, was an English international rugby union player of the 1920s.

Kirwan-Taylor was born in Sutton, Surrey. One of his brothers was the long-serving Conservative MP Charles Taylor and another, Alfred Suenson-Taylor, 1st Baron Grantchester, stood unsuccessfully for the House of Commons as a Liberal. He read law at Trinity College, Cambridge, and featured in the 1926 Varsity Match for Cambridge University.

In 1928, Kirwan-Taylor gained five England caps as a right wing three-quarter, which included all four matches of their grand slam-winning Five Nations campaign, contributing a try against Wales at Swansea.

Kirwan-Taylor, a surveyor by profession, served as a lieutenant colonel with the Rifle Brigade during World War II and was also a General Staff Officer in the American 1st Airborne Division. He was made an Officer of the British Empire (OBE) in the 1946 Birthday Honours for his military service.

== See also ==
- List of England national rugby union players
