= Caroline Ansell =

British politician

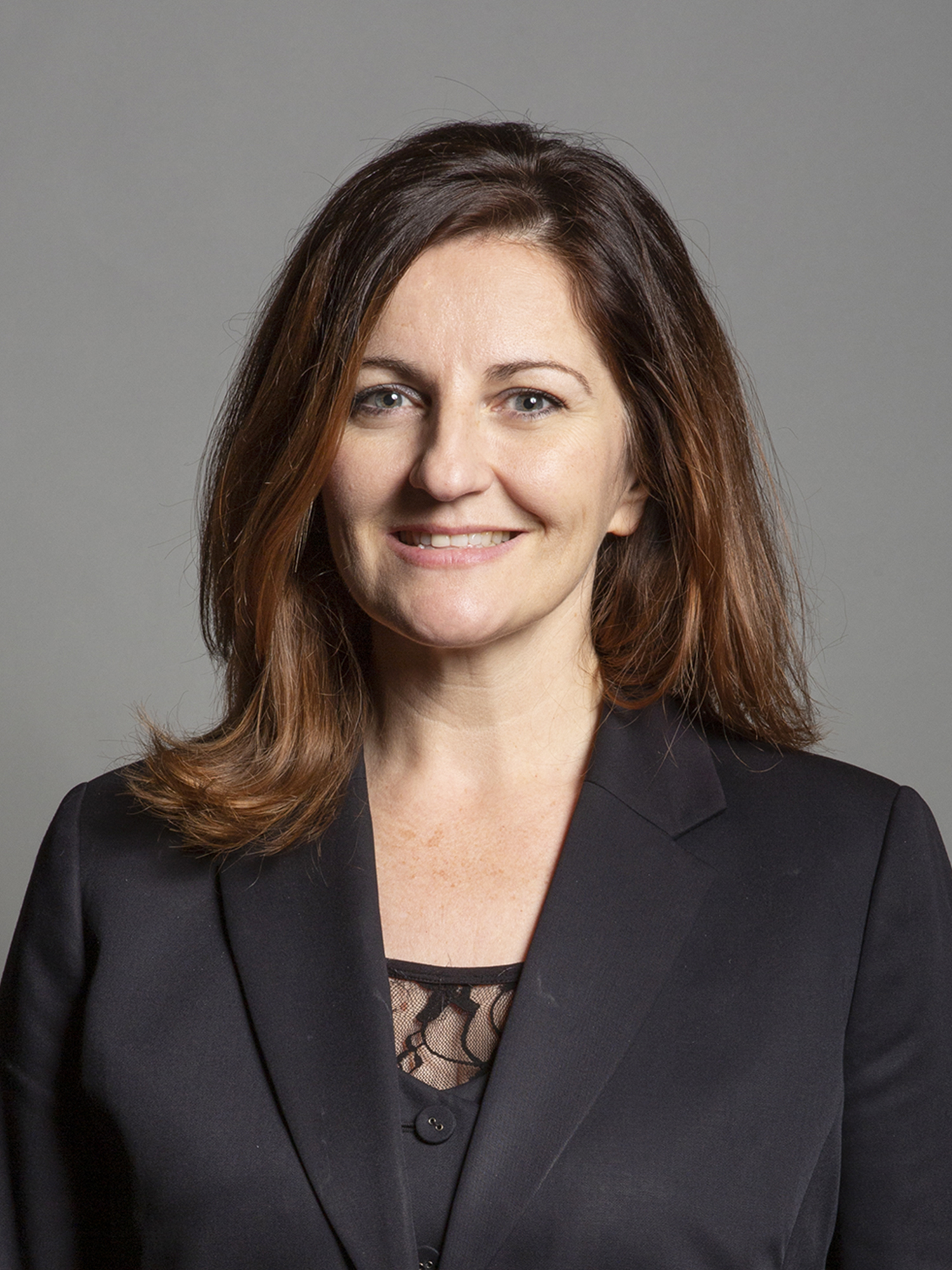
- Official portrait, 2019

Member of Parliament for Eastbourne
- In office 12 December 2019 – 30 May 2024
- Preceded by: Stephen Lloyd
- Succeeded by: Josh Babarinde
- In office 7 May 2015 – 3 May 2017
- Preceded by: Stephen Lloyd
- Succeeded by: Stephen Lloyd

Personal details
- Born: Caroline Julie Porte Ansell; 12 January 1971 (age 55) Eastbourne, East Sussex, England
- Party: Conservative
- Spouse: Nicholas Ansell (m. 1997)
- Children: 3
- Education: Beresford House School; Royal Holloway, University of London (BA); University of Brighton (MA)
- Occupation: Politician; school teacher

Caroline Julie Porte Ansell (born 12 January 1971) is a British Conservative Party politician who was the Member of Parliament (MP) for Eastbourne from 2015 to 2017, and again from 2019 to 2024.

She was first elected at the 2015 general election, but was defeated at the snap 2017 general election.

== Early life and career ==
Caroline Ansell was born on 12 January 1971 in Eastbourne, the youngest of four daughters of Scottish parents. Her early education was at state primaries, before being educated at Beresford House School in Eastbourne.

She attended university at Royal Holloway, University of London, studying a Bachelor of Arts in French. Ansell also studied business at the private university École supérieure de commerce and, aged 30, gained a master's degree in education from the University of Brighton in 2001.

Ansell worked for a number of years as a French teacher, in both the private and state sectors. She qualified as a headteacher in 2008, at the age of 37, but did not take up a role in this profession. She worked in a support role at Cavendish School in Eastbourne in the same year as one of her children was diagnosed with a brain tumour, which led her to take a sabbatical from teaching.

== Political career ==
Ansell was first elected as a Conservative Party councillor on 31 May 2012, at the age of 41. She served as a councillor for three years, representing the Meads ward of Eastbourne Borough Council.

During her time as a councillor, Ansell successfully secured cross party support to establishing Eastbourne as the 'Eastern Gateway Town' to the South Downs National Park and the authority's support for a second runway at Gatwick Airport. She was part of the team to bring back Meads Magic, a community Christmas event which brings thousands of people to the area.

Ansell was subsequently elected again as a Councillor on 2 May 2019, this time representing Sovereign Ward of Eastbourne Borough Council. During her second term on the council, she worked cross party to oppose the closure of the station health centre, helped ensure the completion of the Sovereign Harbour Community Centre and led the campaign against the usage of out-of-area placements in Eastbourne by Brighton & Hove Council.

== Parliamentary career ==
=== 1st term as MP (2015–2017) ===
At the 2015 general election, Ansell was elected to Parliament as MP for Eastbourne with 39.6% of the vote and a majority of 733.

Ansell exerted influence with ministers to enable substantial investment into the town. This included £75 million to improve the A27, a major problem for Eastbourne, and £5 million from the government's Local Growth Fund Round 3 programme given to the town's Devonshire Park development and a share of £13.2 million earmarked for Sovereign Harbour from the same pot of money.

In April 2016, Ansell helped an American Eastbourne resident and mother Katy Garlington, who was allowed to stay in the UK after Ansell intervened with the Home Office and persuaded the then immigration minister James Brokenshire to stop her deportation. Another Eastbourne resident Atterbell Maplanka was released from custody over immigration issues after another intervention from Ansell. Ansell also championed the campaign by victims of revenge porn offender Olly Whiting to obtain justice for his crimes after he posted content on a US website, working with local police, Sussex PCC Katy Bourne and the then-Home Secretary, Theresa May.

Ansell worked with local Eastbourne actress Lauren Backler and her campaign to reduce the bowel cancer screening age from 60 to 50 in England to bring it in line with Scotland. Backler lost her mother to the disease and Ansell organised a parliamentary debate on the issue and lobbied ministers to look into the lowering the age to 50. Backler became a champion for the charity Bowel Cancer UK and raised awareness of the condition and its symptoms.

Ansell voted to leave the EU at the 2016 Brexit referendum, in line with her constituency who voted by 57% to 43% to do the same. Prior to making her intention to vote for Brexit, Ansell organised and chaired the largest debate on the issue in the south east of England. The Big Eastbourne EU debate took place at the 1680-capacity Congress Theatre in the town on 26 May 2016 after the 900-seat Winter Garden was too small for the numbers who wanted to attend. In the 2016 Conservative leadership election, Ansell supported Theresa May.

In April 2017, a 51-year-old man from Eastbourne was jailed for four months after pleading guilty for posting multiple death threats directed at Ansell via social media. The perpetrator had previously pleaded guilty to a charge of "sending via electronic communications a message that was grossly offensive". He was also issued with a restraining order forbidding him from contacting Ansell.

At the snap 2017 general election, Ansell was defeated as MP for Eastbourne, coming second with 44.1% of the vote behind the Liberal Democrat candidate Stephen Lloyd.

=== 2nd term as MP (2019–2024) ===
Ansell returned to Parliament as MP for Eastbourne at the 2019 general election with 48.9% of the vote and a majority of 4,331.

In October 2020, Ansell voted against the government on an opposition day motion on funding free school meals over school holidays. She then resigned her job as a parliamentary private secretary at the Department for Environment, Food and Rural Affairs, because she had voted against the government, of which she was a member at the time.

In January 2022, during the Covid-related staff shortages Ansell returned to her former profession as a teacher, in response to an appeal by the Education Secretary Nadhim Zahawi for ex-teachers to return to the classrooms. While some expressed reservations about bringing back retired teachers, Ansell promised to use her experience to help shape government policy. She asserted that it was "mission critical" to keep schools open.

Ansell put forward an amendment which aimed to reduce the upper limit for abortion from 24 to 22 weeks, securing the support of 40 other MPs.

In May 2024, Ansell was re-selected as the Conservative candidate for Eastbourne at the 2024 general election. In the election she was unseated by Liberal Democrat Josh Babarinde, who was once a pupil that she taught.

== Personal life ==
Ansell married Nicholas Ansell, a PE teacher, in 1997 with whom she has three children.

Parliament of the United Kingdom
Preceded by Stephen Lloyd	Member of Parliament for Eastbourne; 2015–2017	Succeeded by Stephen Lloyd
Preceded by Stephen Lloyd	Member of Parliament for Eastbourne; 2019–2024	Succeeded by Josh Babarinde
