= Glanford and Scunthorpe =

UK Parliament constituency (1983–1997)

- Former borough constituency for the House of Commons
- Glanford and Scunthorpe in Humberside, showing boundaries used from 1983-1997
- County: 1983-1996 Humberside; 1996-1997 North Lincolnshire
- Major settlements: Scunthorpe

1983–1997
- Seats: One
- Created from: Brigg and Scunthorpe
- Replaced by: Scunthorpe, Brigg and Goole

Glanford and Scunthorpe was a parliamentary constituency centred on the borough of Glanford and the town of Scunthorpe in Humberside. It returned one Member of Parliament (MP) to the House of Commons of the Parliament of the United Kingdom.

== History ==
The constituency was created for the 1983 general election, and abolished for the 1997 general election. It was held by the Conservative Party in 1983, and gained by the Labour Party in 1987. Labour then held the seat until its abolition.

== Boundaries ==
The Borough of Scunthorpe, and the Borough of Glanford wards of Bottesford Central, Bottesford East, Bottesford West, Broughton, Burton upon Stather, Gunness, Messingham, North West, Trentside, and Winterton.

== Members of Parliament ==
Election	Member	Party
1983	Richard Hickmet	Conservative
1987	Elliot Morley	Labour
1997	constituency abolished: see Scunthorpe & Brigg and Goole	

== Elections ==
1979 notional result
Party	Vote	%
Labour	24,528	45.9
Conservative	21,535	40.3
Liberal	5,785	10.8
Others	1,611	3.0
Turnout	53,459	
Electorate		

=== Elections in the 1980s ===
General election 1983: Glanford and Scunthorpe
Party	Candidate	Votes	%	±%
Conservative	Richard Hickmet	20,356	38.5	–1.8
Labour	John Ellis	19,719	37.3	–8.6
SDP	Cyril Nottingham	12,819	24.2	+13.4
Majority		637	1.2	
Turnout		52,894	73.5	
Registered electors		71,962		
Conservative win (new seat)				

General election 1987: Glanford and Scunthorpe
Party	Candidate	Votes	%	±%
Labour	Elliot Morley	24,733	43.5	+6.2
Conservative	Richard Hickmet	24,221	42.6	+4.1
SDP	Cyril Nottingham	7,762	13.7	−10.6
Independent	Kailish Trivedi	104	0.2	New
Majority		512	0.9	N/A
Turnout		56,820	78.0	+4.5
Registered electors		72,816		
Labour gain from Conservative		Swing	+1.1	

=== Elections in the 1990s ===
General election 1992: Glanford and Scunthorpe
Party	Candidate	Votes	%	±%
Labour	Elliot Morley	30,637	52.8	+9.3
Conservative	Andrew M. Seywood	22,226	38.3	−4.3
Liberal Democrats	Wesley Paxton	4,186	7.2	−6.4
SDP	Cyril Nottingham	996	1.7	N/A
Majority		8,411	14.5	+13.6
Turnout		58,045	79.0	+1.0
Registered electors		73,479		
Labour hold		Swing	+6.8	

== See also ==
- List of parliamentary constituencies in Humberside
