= Richard Hickmet =

British politician (1947–2024)

Member of Parliament for Glanford and Scunthorpe
- In office 9 June 1983 – 18 May 1987
- Preceded by: Constituency established
- Succeeded by: Elliot Morley

Personal details
- Born: Richard Saladin Hackmet; 1 December 1947 London, England
- Died: 10 September 2024 (aged 76) Bridgwater, Somerset, England
- Party: Conservative
- Spouse: Susan Ludwig (m. 1973)
- Children: 3
- Education: University of Hull (BA)
- Profession: Barrister

Richard Saladin Hickmet (1 December 1947 – 10 September 2024) was a British Conservative Party politician and barrister who was the MP for Glanford and Scunthorpe from 1983 to 1987.

== Early life ==
Hickmet was born in London in 1947. Of Turkish Cypriot origin, Hickmet's father, Ferid Hikmet, emigrated from Cyprus to the UK in the 1930s. His father and uncle, Nevvar Hikmet, were well known in the Turkish Cypriot community, and opened several restaurants in Soho, London in the 1940s, during World War II.

Hickmet went to Millfield School in Street, Somerset, then the Sorbonne in Paris. From the University of Hull he gained a BA.

He was called to the Bar in 1974, and practised at the Inner Temple. He was a councillor on Wandsworth Borough Council from 1978 to 1983.

== Parliamentary career ==
Hickmet was Member of Parliament for Glanford and Scunthorpe, which he won in the Conservative landslide at the 1983 general election. However, he lost it to Labour candidate Elliot Morley at the 1987 election. Hickmet was later an unsuccessful candidate at the Eastbourne by-election in 1990 caused by the murder of Ian Gow.

His last recorded contribution in the House of Commons was during Prime Minister's Questions on 5 May 1987, during which he said that "most parents are appalled by the promotion of gay rights" in schools, before suggesting that schools should be given more independence on such matters.

== Later career ==
Hickmet was later a barrister at law specialising in family practice and planning cases. He was based in the West Country in Somerset but frequently traveled to London with his work, and had a practice spanning the whole of the West Country and the Midlands. He also worked for Wolfestans in Plymouth, Alletsons in Bridgwater and was affiliated with Southernhay Chambers in Exeter.

He was selected as High Sheriff of Somerset for 2017–18.

== Personal life and death ==
Hickmet lived in Bridgwater, Somerset with his wife. He married Susan Ludwig in 1973, and together they had three daughters. He died at home on 10 September 2024, at the age of 76.

== Sources ==
- The Times Guide to the House of Commons, Times Newspapers Ltd, 1987 & 1992
- Almanac of British Politics (1999)
- Leigh Rayment's Historical List of MPs

Parliament of the United Kingdom
New constituency	Member of Parliament for Glanford and Scunthorpe; 1983–1987	Succeeded by Elliot Morley
