= Edward Field (Royal Navy officer) =

British politician & Royal Navy Admiral (1828-1912)

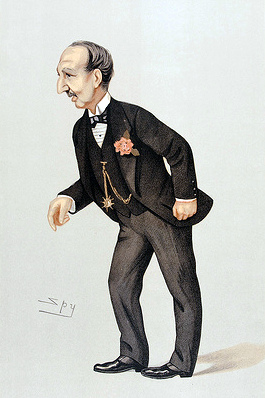
"The Yellow Admiral" Field as depicted by Spy (Leslie Ward) in Vanity Fair, July 1891

Admiral Edward Field CB (December 1828 – 26 March 1912) was a Royal Navy officer and English Conservative politician.

Field was born at Chesham, Buckinghamshire and joined the Royal Navy, becoming a lieutenant on 20 December 1851. From 1 January 1857 he was a lieutenant on gunneryship HMS Excellent at Portsmouth. He was promoted to Commander on 16 June 1859. On 31 January 1863 he became Commander in HMS Trincomalee, Royal Naval reserve training ship at Sunderland on 23 July 1866 he commander a cruiser under commissioning at Portsmouth, and on 10 August 1866 became Commander in HMS Helicon of the Channel squadron. He retired from the navy as a captain and in 1881 was living at The Grove, Alverstoke, Hampshire with his wife Mary Ann. He was a JP.

At the 1885 general election Field was elected as Member of Parliament (MP) for Eastbourne. He was by this time a Rear Admiral and spoke on naval matters in parliament. He held his seat until he stood down at the 1900 general election. He was promoted to admiral on the retired list in 1897.

He was appointed Companion of the Order of the Bath in 1897.

His wife Mary Ann died at The Grove, Alverstoke on 15 January 1903. Field himself died at Alverstoke on 26 March 1912, at the age of 83.

Parliament of the United Kingdom
New constituency previously in East Sussex	Member of Parliament for Eastbourne; 1885–1900	Succeeded by Lindsay Hogg
