= 1990 Eastbourne by-election =

UK parliamentary by-election

- 18 October 1990

Constituency of Eastbourne
- Turnout: 60.7% (▼14.9%)
	First party	Second party	Third party
Candidate	David Bellotti	Richard Hickmet	Charlotte Atkins
Party	Liberal Democrats	Conservative	Labour
Popular vote	23,415	18,865	2,308
Percentage	50.8%	41.0%	5.0%
Swing	▲21.1%	▼18.9%	▼3.8%
MP before election
Ian Gow
Conservative
Elected MP
David Bellotti
Liberal Democrats

The 1990 Eastbourne by-election was a by-election held on 18 October 1990 for the UK House of Commons constituency of Eastbourne in East Sussex.

== Background ==
The by-election was caused by the death of the town's Conservative Party Member of Parliament (MP) Ian Gow, who was killed on 30 July 1990 by a bomb placed under his car by the Provisional IRA.

The result was a victory for the Liberal Democrat candidate David Bellotti, who defeated former Conservative MP Richard Hickmet by a majority of 4,550 votes and with more than half the votes cast. The loss came as a shock to many Conservatives who had expected (not least given the circumstances under which the by-election was held, as well as the fact that it had been retained by a majority of more than 16,000 votes in 1987) that they would retain the seat. Conservative MP Ann Widdecombe sent a message to voters saying that the IRA would be "toasting their success".

It was a welcome success for the Liberal Democrats, formed in March 1988, after some disastrous early local and European election showings, as well as dismal showings in opinion polls. It came at a time when Conservative support was slumping and Labour was enjoying a comfortable lead in the opinion polls, largely due to the unpopular introduction of poll tax by the Conservative government.

The Liberal Democrats, whose newly adopted party emblem was a 'bird of liberty', had been compared by Margaret Thatcher in a Conservative Party conference speech on 12 October to a "dead parrot". The shock defeat contributed to the end of Thatcher's premiership in November 1990 as Conservative MPs worried if they could hold their seats at a general election if she remained prime minister.

== Result ==
By-election 1990: Eastbourne
Party	Candidate	Votes	%	±%
Liberal Democrats	David Bellotti	23,415	50.8	+21.1
Conservative	Richard Hickmet	18,865	41.0	−18.9
Labour	Charlotte Atkins	2,308	5.0	−3.8
Green	David Aherne	553	1.2	−0.4
Liberal	Theresia Williamson	526	1.1	New
Corrective Party	Lady Whiplash	216	0.5	New
National Front	John McAuley	154	0.3	New
Ironside Party	Eric Page	35	0.1	New
Majority		4,550	9.8	N/A
Turnout		46,072	60.7	−14.9
Liberal Democrats gain from Conservative		Swing	+20.0	

== Bibliography ==
- British Parliamentary by-elections:Campaign literature from the by-election
- UK General Election results June 1987: Eastbourne

== See also ==
- Lists of United Kingdom by-elections
- Eastbourne constituency
- 1925 Eastbourne by-election
- 1932 Eastbourne by-election
- 1935 Eastbourne by-election
