= Charles Taylor (Conservative politician) =

English businessman and Conservative politician

Member of Parliament for Eastbourne
- In office 29 March 1935 – 8 February 1974
- Preceded by: John Slater
- Succeeded by: Ian Gow

Personal details
- Born: 10 April 1910
- Died: 29 March 1989 (aged 78)
- Party: Conservative
- Relations: William Kirwan-Taylor (brother); Alfred Suenson-Taylor (brother)

Sir Charles Stuart Taylor TD (10 April 1910 – 29 March 1989) was an English businessman and Conservative politician who sat in the House of Commons from 1935 to 1974. He was the son of Alfred George Taylor and Mary Kirwan. His elder brother was the Liberal politician Alfred Suenson-Taylor.

Taylor was educated at Epsom College, Surrey, and at Trinity College, Cambridge. In 1935 he was elected as Member of Parliament (MP) for Eastbourne in East Sussex, in an unopposed by-election on 29 March following the death of Conservative MP John Slater. At the age of 25 he was the youngest member in the house. He was awarded MA from Cambridge in 1937.

Taylor fought in the Second World War in the Royal Artillery and became a Temporary Major in 1941. He was awarded the Territorial Decoration. He was managing director of Cow and Gate and later Unigate. In 1946 he became President of Grosvenor House (Park Lane) Ltd, Residential Hotels Association. He became the Deputy Lieutenant of Sussex in 1948 and was knighted in 1954. In 1958 he became Honorary Colonel in the 3rd (Sussex Battalion) Mobile Defence Corps. He was invested as a Serving Brother, Most Venerable Order of the Hospital of St John of Jerusalem.

Taylor held Eastbourne until he was de-selected by his local party prior to the February 1974 general election. He was succeeded by Ian Gow.

Taylor married the actress Constance Ada Shotter on 20 May 1936. They had three sons and a daughter and lived at Ratton Wood, Willingdon, Eastbourne, Sussex.

Parliament of the United Kingdom
Preceded by John Slater	Member of Parliament for Eastbourne; 1935–Feb 1974	Succeeded by Ian Gow
Preceded by Lord Willoughby de Eresby	Baby of the House; 1935	Succeeded by Malcolm Macmillan
