= 1932 Eastbourne by-election =

UK parliamentary by-election

The 1932 Eastbourne by-election was a by-election held on 28 April 1932 for the British House of Commons constituency of Eastbourne in East Sussex.

The by-election was caused by the death of the town's Conservative Party Member of Parliament (MP) Edward Marjoribanks, who had held the seat since the 1929 general election.

The Conservative candidate, John Slater, was returned unopposed.

== See also ==
- List of United Kingdom by-elections
- Eastbourne constituency
- 1925 Eastbourne by-election
- 1935 Eastbourne by-election
- 1990 Eastbourne by-election
