= Hubert Beaumont (Liberal politician) =

British politician (1864–1922)

The Honourable Hubert George Beaumont
- Beaumont in 1906

Member of Parliament for Eastbourne
- In office 1906 – January 1910
- Preceded by: Lindsay Hogg
- Succeeded by: Rupert Sackville Gwynne

Personal details
- Born: 6 April 1864
- Died: 14 August 1922 (aged 58)
- Party: Liberal
- Spouse: Elisa Mercedes Grace (m. 1900; died 1917)
- Children: 1
- Parents: Wentworth Beaumont (father); Lady Margaret Anne de Burgh (mother)
- Relatives: Michael Beaumont (son); Ulick de Burgh (maternal grandfather); Wentworth Beaumont (brother)
- Education: Eton College; Cheltenham College
- Alma mater: Balliol College, Oxford

Hubert George Beaumont (6 April 1864 – 14 August 1922), styled The Honourable from 1906, was a radical British Liberal Party politician.

== Background ==
He was the third son of Wentworth Beaumont, 1st Baron Allendale and his wife Lady Margaret Anne de Burgh, daughter of Ulick de Burgh, 1st Marquess of Clanricarde. Beaumont was educated at Eton College and then at Cheltenham College. He studied at Balliol College, Oxford, obtaining a Bachelor of Arts degree. On 26 May 1900, he married Elisa Mercedes Grace, daughter of Michael Paul Grace. She drowned on 10 August 1917. Their only son was Michael Wentworth Beaumont. He was invested as a Knight of Grace of the Most Venerable Order of the Hospital of Saint John of Jerusalem in 1918 and was appointed High Sheriff of Buckinghamshire in the next year.

== Political career ==
He contested King's Lynn in 1895, thereafter Buckingham in 1900 and Barnard Castle three years later. Beaumont finally entered the British House of Commons in 1906, sitting for Eastbourne until January 1910 when he chose not to defend his seat. He briefly sat in the Commons at the same time as his older brother Wentworth Beaumont. He contested the 1913 London County Council election as a Progressive candidate for Clapham

=== Electoral record ===
General election 1895: King's Lynn
Party	Candidate	Votes	%	±%
Conservative	Thomas Gibson Bowles	1,395	51.3	+1.1
Liberal	Hubert Beaumont	1,326	48.7	−1.1
Majority		69	2.6	+2.2
Turnout		2,721	91.3	+2.8
Registered electors		2,979		
Conservative hold		Swing	+1.1	

General election 1900: Buckingham
Party	Candidate	Votes	%	±%
Conservative	William Carlile	5,101	52.1	−0.1
Liberal	Hubert Beaumont	4,684	47.9	+0.1
Majority		417	4.2	−0.2
Turnout		9,785	83.7	−4.9
Registered electors		11,685		
Conservative hold		Swing	−0.1	

By-election, 1903: Barnard Castle
Party	Candidate	Votes	%	±%
Labour Repr. Cmte.	Arthur Henderson	3,370	35.47	n/a
Conservative	William Lyonel Vane	3,323	34.97	−6.34
Liberal	Hubert Beaumont	2,809	29.56	−29.13
Majority		47	0.49	n/a
Turnout		9,502	84.64	+6.95
Registered electors		11,226		
Labour Repr. Cmte. gain from Liberal				

General election 1906: Eastbourne
Party	Candidate	Votes	%	±%
Liberal	Hubert Beaumont	5,933	52.8	+6.6
Conservative	Lindsay Hogg	5,303	47.2	−6.6
Majority		630	5.6	n/a
Turnout		11,236	87.0	+5.2
Registered electors		12,913		
Liberal gain from Conservative		Swing	+6.6	

1913 London County Council election:Clapham
Party	Candidate	Votes	%	±%
Municipal Reform	Robert Montefiore Sebag-Montefiore	8,890	28.0	−2.3
Municipal Reform	Herbert James Francis Parsons	8,881	27.9	−2.7
Progressive	Hubert George Beaumont	7,049	22.2	+2.7
Progressive	Oswald Partington	6,971	21.9	+2.4
Majority		1,832	5.7	
Municipal Reform hold		Swing	-2.5	

Parliament of the United Kingdom
Preceded by Lindsay Hogg	Member of Parliament for Eastbourne; 1906 – January 1910	Succeeded by Rupert Sackville Gwynne
