= Edward Marjoribanks (Conservative politician) =

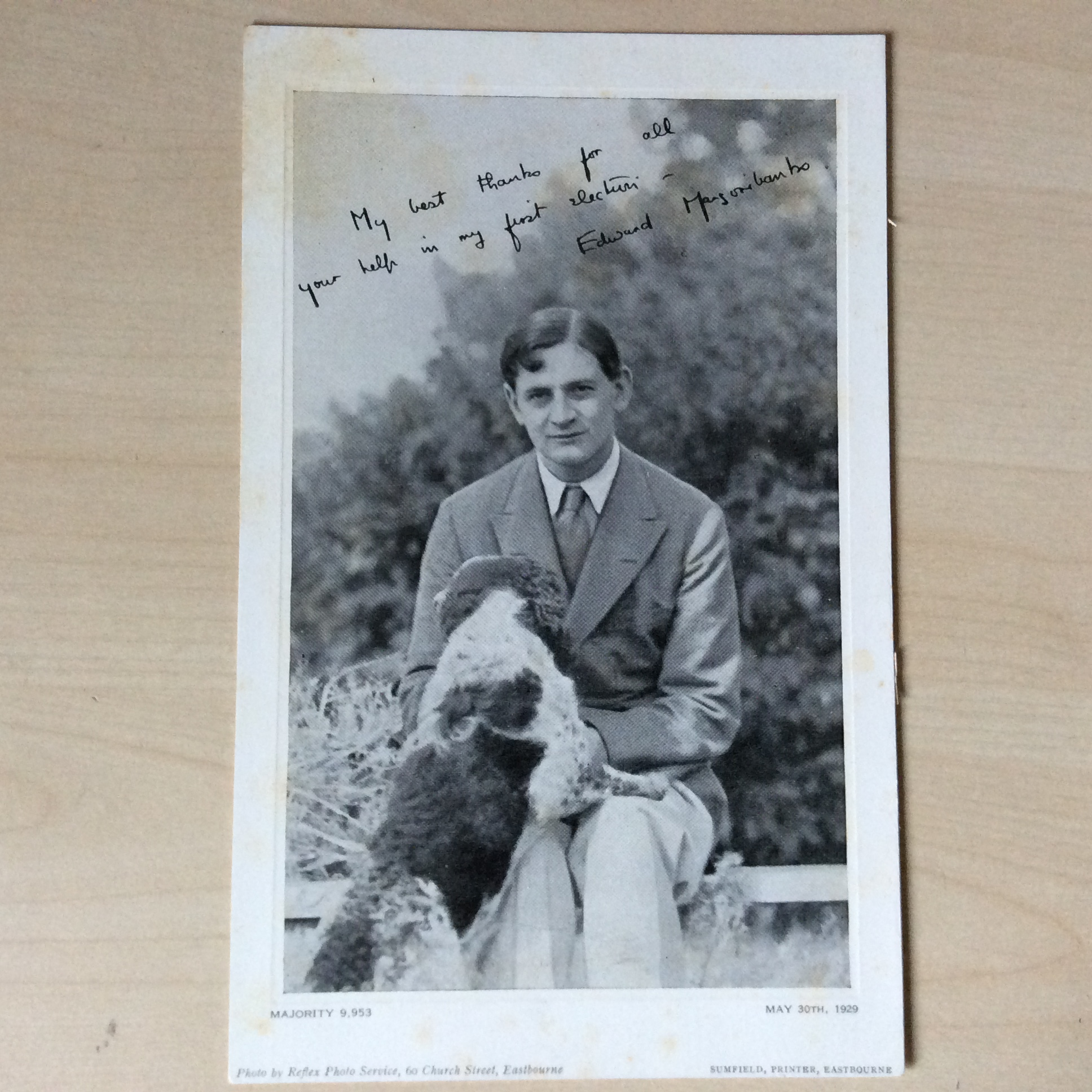
Edward Marjoribanks – 1929

Edward Marjoribanks (14 February 1900 – 2 April 1932) was a barrister and Conservative Party politician in the United Kingdom.

Marjoribanks was the son of the Hon. Archibald Marjoribanks (son of Dudley Marjoribanks, 1st Baron Tweedmouth) and his wife Elizabeth (daughter of James Trimble Brown, a judge from Nashville, Tennessee). Archibald died in September 1900, when Edward was seven months old. In 1905, Elizabeth remarried to Douglas Hogg, 1st Viscount Hailsham, later Lord Chancellor.

Marjoribanks was educated at Eton and Christ Church, Oxford, serving as President of the Oxford Union in 1922. He was subsequently called to the bar. At the 1929 general election, he was elected as member of parliament (MP) for Eastbourne in East Sussex, and held the seat at the 1931 general election.

He died in office on 2 April 1932, committing suicide by shooting himself in the chest while in the billiard room of his stepfather, Lord Hailsham's house in Sussex. He had been jilted for a second time. Marjoribanks had just completed the first volume of a planned three-volume account of the trials of Sir Edward Carson; his last chapter being the George Archer-Shee case. The work was finished by Ian Colvin. At the resulting 1932 Eastbourne by-election, the Conservative candidate John Slater was returned unopposed.

At the time of his death, Marjoribanks was heir presumptive to the hereditary peerage held by his cousin, Lord Tweedmouth (the title became extinct in 1935). His half-brother and second cousin was Quintin Hogg, Baron Hailsham of St Marylebone.

== Books ==
He wrote a biography of Sir Edward Marshall Hall published under the following titles:

- The Life of Sir Edward Marshall Hall, Victor Gollancz Ltd, London 1929.
- Famous Trials of Marshall Hall, Penguin Books, Series number 778, July 1950
- Famous Trials of Marshall Hall, Penguin, 1989. ISBN 0-14-011556-0

Parliament of the United Kingdom
Preceded by Sir Reginald Hall	Member of Parliament for Eastbourne; 1929–1932	Succeeded by John Slater
