= Ian Gow =

British politician (1937–1990)

Ian Gow TD
- Gow in 1985

Minister of State for the Treasury
- In office 2 September 1985 – 19 November 1985
- Prime Minister: Margaret Thatcher
- Preceded by: Barney Hayhoe
- Succeeded by: Peter Brooke

Minister for Housing
- In office 13 June 1983 – 2 September 1985
- Prime Minister: Margaret Thatcher
- Preceded by: John Stanley
- Succeeded by: John Patten

Parliamentary Private Secretary to the Prime Minister
- In office 4 May 1979 – 13 June 1983
- Prime Minister: Margaret Thatcher
- Preceded by: Roger Stott
- Succeeded by: Michael Alison

Member of Parliament for Eastbourne
- In office 28 February 1974 – 30 July 1990
- Preceded by: Charles Stuart Taylor
- Succeeded by: David Bellotti

Personal details
- Born: Ian Reginald Edward Gow; 11 February 1937 Marylebone, London, England
- Died: 30 July 1990 (aged 53) Hankham, East Sussex, England
- Cause of death: Assassination by car bomb
- Party: Conservative
- Spouse: Jane Packe (m. 1966)
- Children: 2
- Occupation: Solicitor

Military service
- Allegiance: United Kingdom
- Branch/service: British Army
- Years of service: 1955–1976
- Rank: Major
- Unit: 15th/19th The King's Royal Hussars

Ian Reginald Edward Gow TD (/ɡaʊ/; 11 February 1937 – 30 July 1990) was a British politician and solicitor. As a member of the Conservative Party, he served as Member of Parliament (MP) for Eastbourne from 1974, until his assassination in 1990 by the Provisional Irish Republican Army (IRA) outside his home in East Sussex.

== Early life ==
Ian Reginald Edward Gow was born at 3 Upper Harley Street, London on Thursday 11 February 1937. He was the son of Alexander Edward Gow, a London doctor attached to St Bartholomew's Hospital who died in September 1952. Ian Gow was educated at Sandroyd School and then Winchester College, where he was president of the debating society. During a period of national service from 1955 to 1958 he was commissioned in the 15th/19th Hussars and served in Northern Ireland, Germany and Malaya. He subsequently served in the territorial army until 1976, attaining the rank of major.

After completing national service he took up a career in the law and qualified as a solicitor in 1962. He eventually became a partner in the London practice of Joynson-Hicks and Co. He also became a Conservative Party activist. He stood for Parliament in the Coventry East constituency for the 1964 general election, but lost to Richard Crossman. He then stood for the Clapham constituency, a Labour-held London marginal seat, in the 1966 general election. An account in The Times of his candidature described him in the following terms: "He is a bachelor solicitor, aged 29, wearing his public school manner as prominently as his rosette. Words such as 'overpowering', 'arrogant', and 'bellicose' are used to describe him."

After failing to take Clapham, he continued his quest to find a seat. He eventually succeeded at Eastbourne in 1972 after the local Party de-selected its sitting member, Charles Taylor. Taylor had represented Eastbourne since 1935 and did not take kindly to Gow.

== Parliamentary career ==
Gow entered the House of Commons as the Member of Parliament for Eastbourne in the general election of February 1974. For a home in his constituency, Gow acquired a 16th-century manor house known as The Doghouse in the village of Hankham. Eastbourne was then a safe Conservative seat, and Gow always had a majority share of the vote during his time as MP. In the general election of October 1974, he secured a 10% swing from Liberal to Conservative, doubling his majority.

=== Northern Ireland and Airey Neave ===
In the 1975 Conservative leadership election, Gow voted for Margaret Thatcher in the first round ballot. Once Thatcher had forced Edward Heath out of the contest, several new candidates appeared and Gow switched his support to Geoffrey Howe in the second round, which Thatcher won. Gow was brought onto the Conservative front bench in 1978 to share the duties of opposition spokesman on Northern Ireland with Airey Neave. The two men developed a Conservative policy on Northern Ireland which favoured closer ties with Great Britain in order to further integrate the region. This approach appeared to avoid compromise with the Northern Ireland's nationalist minority and with the government of the Republic of Ireland. Both Neave and Gow were killed by car bomb attacks in 1979 and 1990 respectively. Irish republican paramilitaries claimed responsibility in both cases.

Through his association with Neave, Gow was introduced to the inner circles of the Conservative Party. He was appointed parliamentary private secretary to Margaret Thatcher in May 1979 at the time she became Prime Minister. While serving in this capacity between 1979 and 1983, Gow became a close friend and confidante of the Prime Minister. He was deeply involved in the workings of Thatcher's private office until his departure in June 1983. Though elevated to junior ministerial office as Minister for Housing and Construction before moving later to the Treasury, Gow was known to be disappointed by his loss of influence with the Prime Minister in his new role. In late-1983, he developed plans with Alan Clark to reinvigorate Thatcher's private office by expanding it and its influence over policy, thereby creating a new role for himself; but these came to nothing.

After 1979 Gow shared an office with Michael Brown. Although identified with the right wing of his party, he took a liberal position on some issues. He visited Rhodesia at the time of its Unilateral Declaration of Independence in 1965 and was subsequently critical of the country's white minority regime. As an MP, Gow consistently voted against the restoration of the death penalty. As Minister of State for Housing and Construction (from 1983 to June 1985) he showed a willingness to commit public funds to housing projects that alarmed some on the right wing of the Conservative Party. "After taking what was perhaps too principled a stand in a complex dispute over Housing Improvement Grants, he was moved sideways to the post of minister of state at the Treasury".

=== Resignation over Northern Ireland policy ===
From 1982, Conservative Party policy began to move towards a more flexible position on Northern Ireland. In November 1985, Gow was persuaded by the speeches of his cousin Nicholas Budgen to resign as Minister of State in HM Treasury over the signing of the Anglo-Irish Agreement. Despite his disagreement with government policy, he used his resignation speech to underline his personal devotion to Thatcher, describing her as "the finest chief, the most resolute leader, the kindest friend that any member of this House could hope to serve." The Anglo-Irish Agreement would ultimately lead to devolved government for Northern Ireland, power sharing in the province and engagement with the Republic. After his resignation from the government, Gow became chairman of the parliamentary Conservative backbench committee on Northern Ireland. He was a leading opponent of any compromise with republicans and his tactics in this regard caused concern to the Northern Ireland Secretary Jim Prior and other MPs. According to The Guardian: "He [Gow] co-ordinated the Tory backbench opposition to Mr Prior's Northern Ireland Assembly bill in the early 1980s. His activities were said to have startled other Tory MPs and led to a complaint from an enraged Mr Prior to Mrs Thatcher."

=== Backbencher ===
Although he was opposed to the broadcasting of Parliamentary debates, on 21 November 1989, he delivered the first televised speech in the House of Commons. Until 1989, television cameras did not show proceedings in the House of Commons, although it had been discussed eight times between 1964 and 1989. In 1988, MPs backed an experiment with cameras in the chamber, and House of Commons proceedings were televised for the first time on 21 November 1989. Technically, Gow was not the first MP to appear on camera in the chamber, as Bob Cryer, Labour MP for Bradford South, raised a point of order before Gow presented the Loyal Address at the opening of Parliament. In his speech, Gow referred to a letter he had received from a firm of consultants who had offered to improve his personal appearance and television image, making a few self-deprecating jokes about his baldness. MPs agreed in 1990 to make the experiment permanent.

In spite of his disagreement with the direction in which Government policy on Northern Ireland was moving, Gow remained on close terms with Thatcher. In November 1989, he worked in Thatcher's leadership election campaign against the stalking horse candidate, Sir Anthony Meyer. But it was reported that by the time of his death he believed Thatcher's premiership had reached a logical end and that she should retire. Gow enjoyed friendships with people of various political persuasions, including left-wing Labour MP Tony Banks. Alan Clark described him as "my closest friend by far in politics".

== Personal life ==
Gow married Jane Elizabeth Packe (born 1944) in Yorkshire on 10 September 1966. They had two sons.

== Assassination ==
Although aware that he was a potential IRA target, unlike most British MPs of that era Gow left his telephone number and home address in the local telephone directory and in Who's Who. He never checked under his car for bombs. In the early hours of 30 July 1990, a bomb was planted under Gow's Austin Montego car, which was parked in the driveway of his house in Hankham, near Pevensey in East Sussex. The 4.5 lb (2.0 kg) Semtex bomb detonated at 08:39 as Gow reversed out of his driveway, leaving him with severe wounds to his lower body. He died 10 minutes later as emergency workers removed him from the wreckage of his car.

Upon hearing of Gow's death, Labour Party leader Neil Kinnock commented, "This is a terrible atrocity against a man whose only offence was to speak his mind.... I had great disagreement with Ian Gow and he with me, but no one can doubt his sincerity or his courage, and it is appalling that he should lose his life because of these qualities." In her autobiography, The Downing Street Years, Margaret Thatcher described his murder as an "irreplaceable loss".

The IRA claimed responsibility for killing Gow, stating that he was targeted because he was a "close personal associate" of Thatcher and because of his role in developing British policy on Northern Ireland. Nobody was ever charged with causing his death and claims were reported by journalist Paul Routledge suggesting possible involvement of the United States Central Intelligence Agency (CIA) and intelligence community.

== Aftermath ==
Evaluations of Gow's political career by obituarists were mixed in tone. All commented on his personal charm and his skills in public speaking and political manoeuvre. But his obituary in The Times stated, "It could not be said that his resignation in 1985 cut short a brilliant ministerial career". A tendency towards political intrigue (for example, trying to covertly undermine Jim Prior's Northern Ireland initiative after 1982) made him enemies. Nicholas Budgen commented that Gow's personal devotion to Thatcher may not have been good for Thatcher or her government.

Gow's widow Jane was appointed a DBE in 1990 and thus became Dame Jane Gow. On 4 February 1994, she remarried Lt-Col. Michael Whiteley, and became known as Dame Jane Whiteley. She continues to promote the life and work of her first husband.

When the Eastbourne by-election for his seat in the House of Commons was won by the Liberal Democrat David Bellotti, the Conservative MP Ann Widdecombe sent a message to voters saying "Bellotti is the innocent beneficiary of murder. I suspect that last night as the Liberal Democrats were toasting their success, in its hideouts the IRA were doing the same thing".

Parliament of the United Kingdom
Preceded by Sir Charles Taylor	Member of Parliament for Eastbourne; February 1974–1990	Succeeded by David Bellotti
