= 1918 Keighley by-election =

UK parliamentary by-election

← 1913 (Note: A by-election in this constituency was called for in 1915, with Liberal candidate Swire Smith being elected unopposed.)	26 April 1918	Dec. 1918 →

Constituency of Keighley
- Turnout: 50.2% (▼36.3%)

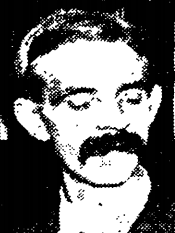
	First party	Second party
Candidate	William Somervell	William Bland
Party	Liberal	Ind. Labour Party
Popular vote	4,873	2,349
Percentage	67.5%	32.5%
Swing	▲28.8% (Note: Compared to the results of the contested 1913 by-election)	New
MP before election
Swire Smith
Liberal
Subsequent MP
William Somervell
Liberal

The 1918 Keighley by-election was a parliamentary by-election held for the UK House of Commons constituency of Keighley in the West Riding of Yorkshire on 26 April 1918.

== Vacancy ==
The by-election was caused by the death on 16 March 1918 of the sitting Liberal MP, Sir Swire Smith.

== Electoral history ==
The most recent contest in the constituency had seen a three-way battle;

1913 Keighley by-election Electorate 14,142
Party	Candidate	Votes	%	±%
Liberal	Stanley Buckmaster	4,730	38.7	N/A
Unionist	Henry Lascelles	3,852	31.5	N/A
Labour	William Bland	3,646	29.8	N/A
Majority		878	7.2	N/A
Turnout		12,228	86.5	N/A
Liberal hold		Swing	N/A	

== Candidates ==
Keighley Liberals chose as their candidate William Somervell, a director of his family business, Somervell Bros. of Kendal, leather merchants and boot manufacturers, later known as K Shoes. Somervell had twice previously contested the South or Kendal Division of Westmorland for the Liberals.

As the by-election was taking place during wartime and Somervell was standing as the candidate of the Coalition government he did not face Conservative or Labour Party opponents. There was however an Independent Labour Party candidate, William Bland, who ran on a "Peace by Negotiation" platform. He had been the official Labour candidate at the previous contested by-election in the constituency, in 1913.

At one point it looked as if there would be a woman candidate in the field. Nina Boyle, a journalist and well-known campaigner for women's suffrage and women's rights made known her intention to put up at the by-election as a candidate of the Women's Freedom League. Although women over thirty gained the vote in 1918, there was some doubt as to whether women were eligible to stand as parliamentary candidates. Boyle announced that she would test the law and if her nomination was refused would take the matter to the courts to obtain a definitive ruling. After some legal consideration, the returning officer stated that he was prepared to accept her nomination, thus establishing an important precedent for women candidates. However he ruled her nomination papers invalid on other grounds: one of the signatories to her nomination was not on the electoral roll and another lived outside the constituency. While Boyle did not therefore appear on the ballot paper, she claimed a moral victory for women's suffrage. The Law Lords were asked to consider the matter and concluded that the Great Reform Act 1832 had specifically banned women from standing as parliamentary candidates. The Representation of the People Act passed earlier in the year, did not change that.

Parliament hurriedly passed the Parliament (Qualification of Women) Act 1918 in time to enable women to stand in the 1918 general election. The act ran to only 27 operative words: "A woman shall not be disqualified by sex or marriage for being elected to or sitting or voting as a Member of the Commons House of Parliament."

== Result ==
Somervell

Somervell was returned easily with a majority of 2,524 votes and well over 50% of the poll.

Keighley by-election, 1918
Party	Candidate	Votes	%	±%
Liberal	William Somervell	4,873	67.5	+28.8
Ind. Labour Party	William Bland	2,349	32.5	+2.7
Majority		2,524	35.0	+27.8
Turnout		7.222	50.2	−36.3
Liberal hold		Swing	+13.0	

Historians have argued that this was an indication of a growing and substantial body of public opinion favouring a negotiated peace settlement with Germany following the publication of the Lansdowne letter and an increasing sign of war-weariness.

== Aftermath ==
Somervell and Bland faced each other again at the General Election 8 months later. However, this time a Unionist also stood and received official endorsement of the Coalition Government, helping him secure victory;

General election 1918 Electorate 34,934
Party	Candidate	Votes	%	±%
Unionist	Robert Clough	8,820	38.6	N/A
Liberal	William Somervell	7,709	33.7	N/A
Labour	William Bland	6,324	27.7	N/A
Majority		1,111	4.9	N/A
Turnout		22,853	65.4	N/A
Unionist gain from Liberal		Swing	N/A	

== See also ==
- List of United Kingdom by-elections
- United Kingdom by-election records
- 1913 Keighley by-election
- 1915 Keighley by-election
