= Keighley and Ilkley =

UK Parliament constituency (1885/2024 onwards)

Coordinates: 53.896°N 1.838°W

- County constituency for the House of Commons
- Interactive map of boundaries since 1983
- Boundary within Yorkshire and the Humber
- County: West Yorkshire
- Electorate: 73,384 (December 2019)
- Major settlements: Keighley, Ilkley, Haworth

Current constituency
- Created: 1885
- Member of Parliament: Robbie Moore (Conservative)
- Seats: One
- Created from: Northern West Riding of Yorkshire

Keighley and Ilkley /ˈkiːθli/ is a constituency in West Yorkshire (Note: A county constituency (for the purposes of election expenses and type of returning officer)) created in 1885 and represented in the House of Commons of the UK Parliament (Note: As with all constituencies, the constituency elects one Member of Parliament (MP) by the first past the post system of election at least every five years.) since 2019 by Robbie Moore of the Conservative Party.

Although the constituency had contained the town of Ilkley since 1983, it was known only as Keighley until the 2024 general election. Further to the 2023 review of Westminster constituencies, there were no changes to the constituency boundaries, but the Boundary Commission for England recommended that it be renamed Keighley and Ilkley.

== Constituency profile ==
Keighley and Ilkley is a constituency in West Yorkshire. It lies within the boundaries of the City of Bradford, although the two main towns are located around 9 miles (14 km) from the centre of Bradford and are not contiguous with it. Keighley is the constituency's largest town with a population of around 50,000. Other settlements include the towns of Ilkley and Silsden and the villages of Haworth, Oakworth, Steeton and Addingham. The constituency lies on the edge of the Pennines, and Keighley and Ilkley are separated by the high moorland of Rombalds Moor. Keighley has a history of brewing and textile manufacturing, and Ilkley is a spa town and popular with tourists. Haworth is also a tourist destination due to its association with the Brontë sisters. The constituency is very divided in terms of wealth; Keighley is highly deprived with most of the town falling within the top 10% most-deprived areas in England, whilst Ilkley is highly affluent. On average, house prices in the constituency are higher than the rest of Yorkshire and the Humber but lower than the national average.

In general, residents of the constituency are older and have average levels of education and income compared to the rest of the country. They are likely to be homeowners and a high proportion work in the healthcare and manufacturing industries. White people made up 80% of the population at the 2021 census. Asians, mostly Pakistanis, were the largest ethnic minority group at 17% and were concentrated in central Keighley where they made up around half the population. At the local council, Keighley is represented by the Labour Party, Ilkley and the villages south of Keighley elected Conservatives, and Silsden and Addingham elected Green Party councillors. An estimated 53% of voters in the constituency supported leaving the European Union in the 2016 referendum, almost identical to the nationwide figure of 52%.

== History ==
Since 1959, the seat has been a bellwether (its winner affiliated to the winning party nationally), with three exceptions: in 1979 and 2017, the seat leant to the left, bucking the national result, while in 2024, the seat was held by the Conservatives despite a landslide victory for the Labour party nationally.

Keighley is one of 9 seats won (held or gained) by a Conservative candidate in 2019 from a total of 22 covering its county. Moore's 2019 win was one of 47 net gains by the Conservative Party.

The seat has been considered – relative to others – a marginal seat, as well as a swing seat, since 2005, as its winner's majority has not exceeded 6.2% of the vote since the 10.5% majority won in 2005, and the seat has changed hands three times since that year.

== Boundaries ==
1885–1918: The parishes in the Wapentake of Staincliffe and Ewecross of Cowling, Glusburn, Keighley, Steeton with Eastburn, and Sutton, and the parishes of Haworth, Thornton, and Wilsden.

1918–1950: The Municipal Borough of Keighley, the Urban Districts of Denholme, Haworth, Oakworth, Oxenhope, and Silsden, and the Rural District of Keighley.

1950–1983: The Municipal Borough of Keighley, the Urban Districts of Denholme and Silsden, and in the Rural District of Skipton the parishes of Steeton with Eastburn, and Sutton.

1983–2010: The City of Bradford wards of Craven, Ilkley, Keighley North, Keighley South, Keighley West, and Worth Valley.

2010–present: The City of Bradford wards of Craven, Ilkley, Keighley Central, Keighley East, Keighley West, and Worth Valley.

The 2023 review of Westminster constituencies left the boundaries of the newly named constituency unchanged for the 2024 general election but changed the name to include Ilkley; indeed its boundaries have remained unchanged since the 1983 redistribution.

== Members of Parliament ==
Since the 1950s, Keighley has been a marginal seat between Labour and the Conservatives. The MP from 1997 was Labour's Ann Cryer, widow of Bob Cryer who was MP for the same seat from 1974 to 1983 (and then for Bradford South, 1987–1994). She retired at the 2010 general election.

John Brigg

Election	Member	Party
1885	Sir Isaac Holden	Liberal
1895	John Brigg	Liberal
1911	Stanley Buckmaster	Liberal
1915	Swire Smith	Liberal
1918	William Somervell	Liberal
1918	Robert Clough	Unionist
1922	Hastings Lees-Smith	Labour
1923	Robert Pilkington	Liberal
1924	Hastings Lees-Smith	Labour
1931	George Harvie-Watt	Conservative
1935	Hastings Lees-Smith	Labour
1942	Ivor Bulmer-Thomas	Labour
1948	Ivor Bulmer-Thomas	Conservative
1950	Charles Hobson	Labour
1959	Marcus Worsley	Conservative
1964	John Binns	Labour
1970	Joan Hall	Conservative
1974	Bob Cryer	Labour
1983	Gary Waller	Conservative
1997	Ann Cryer	Labour
2010	Kris Hopkins	Conservative
2017	John Grogan	Labour
2019	Robbie Moore	Conservative

== Elections ==
=== Elections in the 2020s ===
General election 2024: Keighley and Ilkley
Party	Candidate	Votes	%	±%
Conservative	Robbie Moore	18,589	40.2	−7.9
Labour	John Grogan	16,964	36.7	−7.2
Reform	Andrew Mark Judson	4,782	10.4	+8.8
Green	John Wood	2,447	5.3	N/A
Independent	Vaz Shabir	2,036	4.4	N/A
Liberal Democrats	Chris Adams	970	2.1	−2.8
Yorkshire	Dominic James Atlas	398	0.9	−0.4
Majority		1,625	3.6	−0.6
Turnout		46,186	62.1	−10.0
Registered electors		74,367		
Conservative hold		Swing	−0.3	

=== Elections in the 2010s ===
General election 2019: Keighley
Party	Candidate	Votes	%	±%
Conservative	Robbie Moore	25,298	48.1	+2.0
Labour	John Grogan	23,080	43.9	―2.6
Liberal Democrats	Tom Franks	2,573	4.9	+2.5
Brexit Party	Waqas Ali Khan	850	1.6	N/A
Yorkshire	Mark Barton	667	1.3	N/A
SDP	Matthew Rose	132	0.3	N/A
Majority		2,218	4.2	N/A
Turnout		52,600	72.3	―0.1
Conservative gain from Labour		Swing	+2.3	

General election 2017: Keighley
Party	Candidate	Votes	%	±%
Labour	John Grogan	24,056	46.5	+8.4
Conservative	Kris Hopkins	23,817	46.1	+1.8
UKIP	Paul Latham	1,291	2.5	―9.0
Liberal Democrats	Matt Walker	1,226	2.4	―0.3
Green	Ros Brown	790	1.5	―1.9
Independent	David Crabtree	534	1.0	N/A
Majority		239	0.4	N/A
Turnout		51,714	72.4	+1.1
Labour gain from Conservative		Swing	+3.3	

General election 2015: Keighley
Party	Candidate	Votes	%	±%
Conservative	Kris Hopkins	21,766	44.3	+2.4
Labour	John Grogan	18,713	38.1	+2.3
UKIP	Paul Latham	5,662	11.5	+8.4
Green	Ros Brown	1,661	3.4	N/A
Liberal Democrats	Gareth Epps	1,321	2.7	―12.1
Majority		3,053	6.2	+0.1
Turnout		49,123	71.3	―1.1
Conservative hold		Swing	0.0	

General election 2010: Keighley
Party	Candidate	Votes	%	±%
Conservative	Kris Hopkins	20,003	41.9	+7.6
Labour	Jane Thomas	17,063	35.8	―8.9
Liberal Democrats	Nader Fekri	7,059	14.8	+3.0
BNP	Andrew Brons	1,962	4.1	―5.1
UKIP	Paul Latham	1,470	3.1	N/A
National Front	Steven Smith	135	0.3	N/A
Majority		2,940	6.1	N/A
Turnout		47,962	72.4	+4.5
Conservative gain from Labour		Swing	+8.3	

=== Elections in the 2000s ===
General election 2005: Keighley
Party	Candidate	Votes	%	±%
Labour	Ann Cryer	20,720	44.7	―3.5
Conservative	Karl Poulsen	15,868	34.3	―4.7
Liberal Democrats	Nader Fekri	5,484	11.8	+0.9
BNP	Nick Griffin	4,240	9.2	N/A
Majority		4,852	10.4	+1.2
Turnout		46,312	67.9	+4.5
Labour hold		Swing	+0.6	

General election 2001: Keighley
Party	Candidate	Votes	%	±%
Labour	Ann Cryer	20,888	48.2	―2.4
Conservative	Simon Cooke	16,883	39.0	+2.3
Liberal Democrats	Mike Doyle	4,722	10.9	+1.1
UKIP	Michael Cassidy	840	1.9	N/A
Majority		4,005	9.2	―4.7
Turnout		43,333	63.4	―13.2
Labour hold		Swing	―2.3	

=== Elections in the 1990s ===
General election 1997: Keighley
Party	Candidate	Votes	%	±%
Labour	Ann Cryer	26,039	50.6	+9.8
Conservative	Gary Waller	18,907	36.7	―10.7
Liberal Democrats	Mike Doyle	5,064	9.8	―0.8
Referendum	Colin Carpenter	1,470	2.9	N/A
Majority		7,132	13.9	N/A
Turnout		50,010	76.6	―6.0
Labour gain from Conservative		Swing	+10.2	

General election 1992: Keighley
Party	Candidate	Votes	%	±%
Conservative	Gary Waller	25,983	47.4	+1.6
Labour	Tommy B. Flanagan	22,387	40.8	+5.8
Liberal Democrats	Ian N. Simpson	5,793	10.6	―8.6
Green	Mike Crowson	642	1.2	N/A
Majority		3,596	6.6	―4.2
Turnout		54,805	82.6	+3.2
Conservative hold		Swing	―2.1	

=== Elections in the 1980s ===
General election 1987: Keighley
Party	Candidate	Votes	%	±%
Conservative	Gary Waller	23,903	45.8	+3.2
Labour	Alan Rye	18,297	35.0	―2.0
Liberal	John Wells	10,041	19.2	―0.6
Majority		5,606	10.8	+5.2
Turnout		52,243	79.4	+0.5
Conservative hold		Swing		

General election 1983: Keighley
Party	Candidate	Votes	%	±%
Conservative	Gary Waller	21,370	42.6	
Labour	Bob Cryer	18,596	37.0	
Liberal	John Wells	9,951	19.8	
Ecology	Michael Penney	302	0.6	
Majority		2,774	5.6	N/A
Turnout		50,216	78.9	
Conservative gain from Labour		Swing		

=== Elections in the 1970s ===
General election 1979: Keighley
Party	Candidate	Votes	%	±%
Labour	Bob Cryer	19,698	44.95	▼0.63
Conservative	G. Dawson	19,620	44.77	▲6.37
Liberal	Margaretta Holmstedt	4,062	9.27	▼4.33
National Front	R. L. Fairey	234	0.53	▼1.47
Ecology	J. Wade	208	0.47	N/A
Majority		78	0.18	▼7.00
Turnout		43,819	80.51	▼2.47
Labour hold		Swing		

General election October 1974: Keighley
Party	Candidate	Votes	%	±%
Labour	Bob Cryer	19,569	45.58	
Conservative	Cyril Taylor	16,488	38.40	
Liberal	Margaretta Holmstedt	5,839	13.60	
National Front	G. Wright	859	2.00	N/A
More Prosperous Britain	C. W. Deakin	179	0.42	N/A
Majority		3,081	7.18	
Turnout		42,935	82.98	
Labour hold		Swing		

General election February 1974: Keighley
Party	Candidate	Votes	%	±%
Labour	Bob Cryer	18,595	41.81	
Conservative	Joan Hall	17,717	39.83	
Liberal	Wilfred Whittaker	7,820	17.58	N/A
Social Democrat	John Binns	348	0.78	N/A
Majority		878	1.98	N/A
Turnout		44,480	86.79	
Labour gain from Conservative		Swing		

General election 1970: Keighley
Party	Candidate	Votes	%	±%
Conservative	Joan Hall	20,957	50.75	
Labour	John Binns	20,341	49.25	
Majority		616	1.50	N/A
Turnout		41,298	80.66	
Conservative gain from Labour		Swing		

=== Elections in the 1960s ===
General election 1966: Keighley
Party	Candidate	Votes	%	±%
Labour	John Binns	22,039	55.01	
Conservative	John George Bellak	18,027	44.99	
Majority		4,012	10.02	
Turnout		40,066	83.46	
Labour hold		Swing		

General election 1964: Keighley
Party	Candidate	Votes	%	±%
Labour	John Binns	17,816	42.97	
Conservative	Marcus Worsley	15,115	36.46	
Liberal	William E. Jones	8,529	20.57	N/A
Majority		2,701	6.51	N/A
Turnout		30,874	61.32	
Labour gain from Conservative		Swing		

=== Elections in the 1950s ===
General election 1959: Keighley
Party	Candidate	Votes	%	±%
Conservative	Marcus Worsley	20,626	50.21	
Labour	Charles Hobson	20,456	49.79	
Majority		170	0.42	N/A
Turnout		41,082	85.62	
Conservative gain from Labour		Swing		

General election 1955: Keighley
Party	Candidate	Votes	%	±%
Labour	Charles Hobson	19,414	46.52	
Conservative	Marcus Worsley	16,011	38.36	
Liberal	Ashley Mitchell	6,310	15.12	N/A
Majority		3,403	8.16	
Turnout		41,735	83.89	
Labour hold		Swing		

General election 1951: Keighley
Party	Candidate	Votes	%	±%
Labour	Charles Hobson	23,743	52.72	
Conservative	Kenneth Hargreaves	21,295	47.28	
Majority		2,448	5.44	
Turnout		45,038	87.51	
Labour hold		Swing		

General election 1950: Keighley
Party	Candidate	Votes	%	±%
Labour	Charles Hobson	21,833	48.47	
Conservative	Kenneth Hargreaves	16,252	36.08	
Liberal	John G. Walker	6,962	15.45	
Majority		5,581	12.39	
Turnout		45,097	88.13	
Labour hold		Swing		

=== Elections in the 1940s ===
1945 general election: Keighley
Party	Candidate	Votes	%	±%
Labour	Ivor Thomas	22,222	52.7	+2.2
Conservative	Henry Dalrymple-White	10,865	25.7	−23.8
Liberal	Norman Robson	9,116	21.6	N/A
Majority		11,357	27.0	+26.0
Turnout		42,203	82.3	+3.4
Labour hold		Swing		

1942 Keighley by-election
Party	Candidate	Votes	%	±%
Labour	Ivor Thomas	Unopposed	N/A	N/A
Labour hold		Swing	N/A	

General Election 1939–40:

Another general election was required to take place before the end of 1940. The political parties had been making preparations for an election to take place from 1939 and by the end of this year, the following candidates had been selected:

- Labour; Hastings Lees-Smith
- Conservative; Gay Burdett

=== Elections in the 1930s ===
General election 1935: Keighley
Party	Candidate	Votes	%	±%
Labour	Hastings Lees-Smith	20,124	50.5	+18.6
Conservative	George Harvie-Watt	19,756	49.5	+3.3
Majority		368	1.0	N/A
Turnout		39,880	78.9	−5.0
Labour gain from Conservative		Swing		

General election 1931: Keighley
Party	Candidate	Votes	%	±%
Conservative	George Harvie-Watt	19,079	46.2	+19.8
Labour	Hastings Lees-Smith	13,192	31.9	−12.8
Liberal	William John Crossland Briggs	9,044	21.9	−7.0
Majority		5,887	14.3	N/A
Turnout		41,315	83.9	−1.0
Conservative gain from Labour		Swing		

=== Elections in the 1920s ===
General election 1929: Keighley
Party	Candidate	Votes	%	±%
Labour	Hastings Lees-Smith	18,412	44.7	−0.3
Liberal	David Rhodes	11,905	28.9	+2.3
Unionist	Arthur Smith	10,858	26.4	−2.0
Majority		6,507	15.8	−0.8
Turnout		41,175	84.9	+2.1
Registered electors		48,518		
Labour hold		Swing	−1.3	

General election 1924: Keighley
Party	Candidate	Votes	%	±%
Labour	Hastings Lees-Smith	14,105	45.0	−4.1
Unionist	T. P. Perks	8,922	28.4	N/A
Liberal	Thomas Artemus Jones	8,339	26.6	−24.3
Majority		5,183	16.6	N/A
Turnout		31,366	82.8	+5.4
Registered electors		37,887		
Labour gain from Liberal		Swing	+10.1	

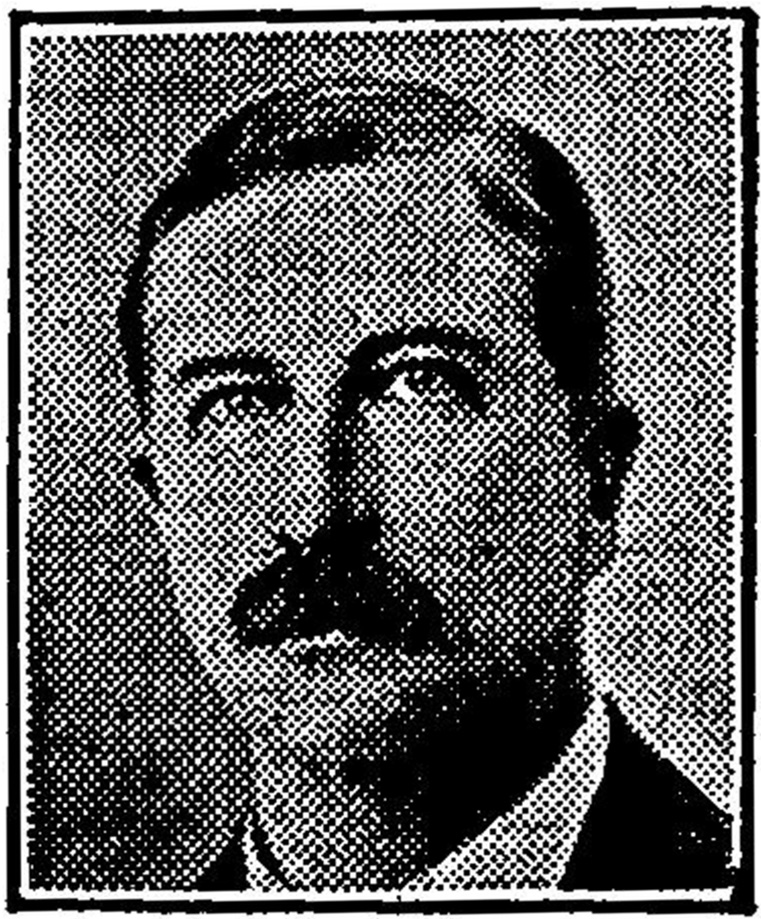
Robert Pilkington

General election 1923: Keighley
Party	Candidate	Votes	%	±%
Liberal	Robert Pilkington	14,609	50.9	+20.2
Labour	Hastings Lees-Smith	14,083	49.1	+2.8
Majority		526	1.8	N/A
Turnout		28,692	77.4	−4.2
Registered electors		37,060		
Liberal gain from Labour		Swing	+8.7	

General election 1922: Keighley
Party	Candidate	Votes	%	±%
Labour	Hastings Lees-Smith	13,978	46.3	+18.6
Liberal	William Anderton Brigg	9,262	30.7	−3.0
Unionist	Charles Henry Foulds	6,955	23.0	−15.6
Majority		4,716	15.6	N/A
Turnout		30,195	81.6	+16.2
Registered electors		37,005		
Labour gain from Unionist		Swing	+10.8	

=== Elections in the 1910s ===
General election 1918: Keighley
Party		Candidate	Votes	%	±%
C	Unionist	Robert Clough	8,820	38.6	N/A
	Liberal	William Somervell	7,709	33.7	N/A
	Labour	William Bland	6,324	27.7	N/A
Majority			1,111	4.9	N/A
Turnout			22,853	65.4	N/A
Registered electors			34,934		
	Unionist gain from Liberal		Swing	N/A	
C indicates candidate endorsed by the coalition government.

- Results compared to December 1910 election

Somervell

1918 Keighley by-election
Party	Candidate	Votes	%	±%
Liberal	William Somervell	4,873	67.5	N/A
Ind. Labour Party	William Bland	2,349	32.5	N/A
Majority		2,524	35.0	N/A
Turnout		7,222	50.2	N/A
Registered electors		14,400		
Liberal hold		Swing	N/A	

1915 Keighley by-election
Party	Candidate	Votes	%	±%
Liberal	Swire Smith	Unopposed		
Liberal hold				

Stanley Buckmaster

1913 Keighley by-election
Party	Candidate	Votes	%	±%
Liberal	Stanley Buckmaster	4,730	38.7	N/A
Unionist	Henry Lascelles, Viscount Lascelles	3,852	31.5	N/A
Labour	William Bland	3,646	29.8	N/A
Majority		878	7.2	N/A
Turnout		12,228	86.5	N/A
Registered electors		14,142		
Liberal hold		Swing	N/A	

1911 Keighley by-election
Party	Candidate	Votes	%	±%
Liberal	Stanley Buckmaster	4,667	39.0	N/A
Conservative	William Mitchell Acworth	3,842	32.1	N/A
Labour	William Crawford Anderson	3,452	28.9	N/A
Majority		825	6.9	N/A
Turnout		11,961	87.3	N/A
Registered electors		13,702		
Liberal hold		Swing	N/A	

General election December 1910: Keighley
Party	Candidate	Votes	%	±%
Liberal	John Brigg	Unopposed		
Liberal hold				

General election January 1910: Keighley
Party	Candidate	Votes	%	±%
Liberal	John Brigg	7,768	65.3	+19.6
Conservative	William Mitchell Acworth	4,132	34.7	+7.0
Majority		3,636	30.6	+12.6
Turnout		11,900	89.0	+0.2
Registered electors		13,373		
Liberal hold		Swing	+6.3	

=== Elections in the 1900s ===
General election 1906: Keighley
Party	Candidate	Votes	%	±%
Liberal	John Brigg	5,322	45.7	−7.4
Liberal Unionist	William Mitchell Acworth	3,229	27.7	−19.2
Independent Labour	W. T. Newlove	3,102	26.6	N/A
Majority		2,093	18.0	+11.8
Turnout		11,653	88.8	+6.8
Registered electors		13,125		
Liberal hold		Swing	+5.9	

General election 1900: Keighley
Party	Candidate	Votes	%	±%
Liberal	John Brigg	5,432	53.1	−1.4
Conservative	W. Bairstow	4,792	46.9	+1.4
Majority		640	6.2	−2.8
Turnout		10,224	82.0	+4.9
Registered electors		12,470		
Liberal hold		Swing	−1.4	

=== Elections in the 1890s ===
General election 1895: Keighley
Party	Candidate	Votes	%	±%
Liberal	John Brigg	5,036	54.5	N/A
Conservative	Walter Bairstow	4,196	45.5	N/A
Majority		840	9.0	N/A
Turnout		9,232	77.1	N/A
Registered electors		11,977		
Liberal hold		Swing	N/A	

General election 1892: Keighley
Party	Candidate	Votes	%	±%
Liberal	Isaac Holden	Unopposed		
Liberal hold				

=== Elections in the 1880s ===
General election 1886: Keighley
Party	Candidate	Votes	%	±%
Liberal	Isaac Holden	Unopposed		
Liberal hold				

General election 1885: Keighley
Party	Candidate	Votes	%	±%
Liberal	Isaac Holden	5,644	66.7	
Conservative	William Henry Carter Dunhill	2,818	33.3	
Majority		2,826	33.4	
Turnout		8,462	84.0	
Registered electors		10,072		
Liberal win (new seat)				

== See also ==
- Parliamentary constituencies in West Yorkshire
- List of parliamentary constituencies in the Yorkshire and the Humber (region)
