= 1911 Keighley by-election =

UK parliamentary by-election

The Keighley by-election was a Parliamentary by-election held on 27 October 1911. The constituency returned one Member of Parliament (MP) to the House of Commons of the Parliament of the United Kingdom, elected by the first past the post voting system.

== Vacancy ==
The vacancy was caused by the death on 30 September 1911 of Sir John Brigg, who had been the Liberal MP for Keighley since 1895.

== Electoral history ==
General election December 1910: Keighley
Party	Candidate	Votes	%	±%
Liberal	John Brigg	Unopposed	N/A	N/A
Liberal hold				

== Candidates ==
- The Liberals chose 50 year-old Stanley Buckmaster to defend a seat the party had held since it was created in 1885. He had been Liberal MP for Cambridge until his defeat in January 1910. He had failed to regain Cambridge in December 1910.
- The Conservative candidate was 60 year-old William Mitchell Acworth who had contested the seat as a Liberal Unionist in 1906 and January 1910, but did not contest the December 1910 elections.
- Although a Socialist had stood here in 1906 and finished third, the Labour party had not contested the seat before. This time they chose to run a 34 year-old Scotsman, William Crawford Anderson as their candidate. Anderson had been Chairman of the Independent Labour Party since 1910.

== Result ==
The by-election was held on 27 October. The seat was held for the Liberals by Stanley Buckmaster, who gained 39% of the vote and obtained a majority of 825 over a Conservative and a Labour candidate.

S.O. Buckmaster

Keighley by-election, 1911
Party	Candidate	Votes	%	±%
Liberal	Stanley Buckmaster	4,667	39.0	N/A
Conservative	William Mitchell Acworth	3,842	32.1	New
Labour	William Crawford Anderson	3,452	28.9	New
Majority		825	6.9	N/A
Turnout		11,961		N/A
Liberal hold		Swing		

== Aftermath ==
In 1913 Buckmaster was appointed Solicitor General and required to fight another by-election

1913 Keighley by-election
Party	Candidate	Votes	%	±%
Liberal	Stanley Buckmaster	4,730	38.7	−0.3
Unionist	Henry Lascelles	3,852	31.5	−0.6
Labour	William Bland	3,646	29.8	+0.9
Majority		878	7.2	+0.3
Turnout		12,228		
Liberal hold		Swing		

Anderson was elected MP for Sheffield Attercliffe in 1914. Acworth did not contest another election.
