= William Somervell =

English businessman, philanthropist and politician (1860–1934)

Member of Parliament for Keighley
- In office 26 April 1918 – 25 November 1918
- Preceded by: Sir Swire Smith
- Succeeded by: Robert Clough

Personal details
- Born: 5 April 1860 Kendal, Westmorland, England
- Died: 26 September 1934 (aged 74) Kendal, Westmorland, England
- Party: Liberal
- Spouse: Florence Howard (m. 1889)
- Children: 3, including Howard Somervell

William Henry Somervell (5 April 1860 – 26 September 1934) was an English businessman, philanthropist and Liberal politician.

== Family and education ==
William Somervell was born at Kendal in Westmorland on 5 April 1860, the son of John Somervell and Rachel Wilson. He was educated at Stramongate School, Kendal and the Grove House School, Tottenham. In 1889, he married Florence Howard of Bickley, near Chislehurst in Kent. They had two sons and a daughter. One of his sons, Howard Somervell (1890–1975), was medical missionary for the London Missionary Society (LMS) hospital at Neyyoor, Travancore in southern India and a mountaineer who climbed Mount Everest and was a colleague of George Mallory.

In religion Somervell was a Congregationalist; an elder of the Zion Congregational Church at Kendal and for many years the superintendent of the Sunday School there. He was a long-serving Treasurer of the London Missionary Society and was regarded as an influential lay member of the country's Christian churches. He twice (in 1913 and again in 1922) was a member of an LMS deputation to India. As a dedicated teetotaller, Somervell was a keen advocate of the LMS' work to promote temperance.

== Philanthropy ==
Somervell's reputation as a philanthropist derives not only from his religious work but rather from his long-time association with the Kendal Charity Organization Society, of which he was for a while, chairman. During this time he gave away what was described as 'a large portion' of his own income.

== Career ==
In 1876, Somervell entered the family business, Somervell Bros. of Kendal, leather merchants and boot manufacturers. Later known as K Shoes, the company remained a major employer in Kendal until its factory closed in 2003. He travelled widely on business for the firm, visiting India, Australia and New Zealand. A director of the firm, he eventually he rose to be chairman of the board during the last years of his life.

== Politics ==
=== Kendal ===
Somervell twice contested the South or Kendal Division of Westmorland in the Liberal interest. In December 1910 he reduced the Unionist majority and lost by 308 votes. He was selected to fight the seat again at a by-election on 18 March 1913 occasioned by the death of the sitting Tory MP Josceline Bagot. He failed to win the seat however and explained his defeat, and the doubling of the Unionist majority, by claiming that his opponent, Colonel John Wakefield Weston (who stood as an Independent Unionist) had been selected because he was a 'semi-Liberal' and a popular local man. To underline this, it was speculated that when the new member took his seat in the House of Commons he would be introduced not by the Conservative whips but by Lord Henry Cavendish-Bentinck and another private member.

=== Keighley ===
Somervell got his chance to enter the House Commons at another by-election, this time in the Liberal seat of Keighley in the West Riding of Yorkshire. The seat had been Liberal held since its creation for the 1885 general election and became vacant on the death of the sitting MP, Sir Swire Smith on 16 March 1918. At the election, Somervell, stood as the candidate of the Coalition government and did not face Conservative or Labour opponents. There was an Independent 'Peace by Negotiation' candidate, William Bland, (who is also referred to in some reference books as an Independent Labour Party candidate) but Somervell was returned easily with a majority of 2,524 votes and well over 50% of the poll. Nevertheless, Bland managed to attract nearly 30% of the vote and one historian has argued that this was an indication of a growing and substantial body of public opinion favouring a negotiated peace settlement with Germany following the publication of the Lansdowne letter and an increasing sign of war-weariness.

However, Somervell's stay in Parliament lasted just 232 days. At the general election of December 1918 he was opposed by Robert Clough for the Conservatives, who appears to have been granted the Coalition Coupon, and Bland again who this time stood as an official Labour Party candidate. Somervell seems to have fallen foul of the Lloyd George Coalition Liberals and their Conservative allies mainly because of his failure to vote for the government in the Maurice Debate, although there were other minor policy differences too. Clough took the seat from Somervell with a majority of 1,111 votes in a close three-cornered contest. Somervell did not stand for Parliament again.

== Appointments ==
Somervell served for many years as a Justice of the Peace in Westmorland and Kendal Borough. During the First World War he was active in recruitment to the armed forces, noted as an energetic speaker at recruitment rallies. Later he was an active member of the War Pensions Tribunals.

== Artist ==
Somervell was reported to have had some skill in painting in water-colours and pastels. He also collected pictures and organised exhibitions of modern art. He was founder member of the Kendal Sketch Club and was an active member of the Society of Modern Artists, the Lake Artists Society between 1918–1924 and the Contemporary Art Society.

== Publication ==
- Commerce as a Vocation in Essays on Vocation, Matthews, Davies and Osler (eds.), Oxford University Press, 1919

== Death ==
Somervell died at his home, Brantfield, Kendal on 26 September 1934 aged 74. He had suffered from ill-health in the last years of his life.

Parliament of the United Kingdom
| Preceded by Sir Swire Smith | Member of Parliament for Keighley; April 1918 – December 1918 | Succeeded by Robert Clough |
