= William Mitchell Acworth =

British railway economist, barrister and politician

Sir William Mitchell Acworth KCSI
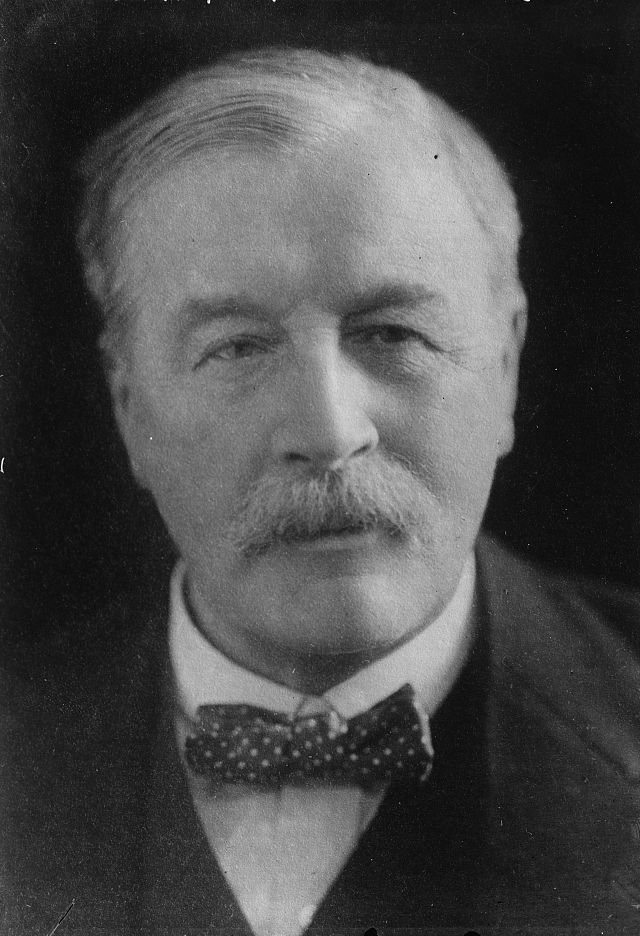
- Born: 22 November 1850; Rothley, Leicestershire, England
- Died: 2 April 1925 (aged 74); The Albany, London, England

Sir William Mitchell Acworth KCSI (22 November 1850 – 2 April 1925) was a British railway economist, barrister and politician.

== Early life and background ==
The third son of the Reverend William Acworth of the Hall, South Stoke, near Bath, Somerset, and Margaret née Dundas, he was born at Rothley, Leicestershire, where his father was vicar in 1850. He was educated at Uppingham School and Christ Church, Oxford. He graduated with a master's degree in modern history in 1875.

== Career ==
For eighteen months after his graduation, he worked in Germany as an English tutor to Prince Wilhelm and Prince Henry of Prussia, the future Kaiser Wilhelm II and his brother. He subsequently took a post as a master in Dulwich College, where he remained until 1885.

Acworth became involved in Conservative and Unionist politics of London, and in 1886 he was elected a member of the Metropolitan Asylums Board. When the first elections to the London County Council were held in January 1889, Acworth was nominated as a candidate of the Conservative-backed Moderate Party. He was elected as one of two councillors representing Dulwich. He served only one term, standing down at the next council elections in 1892. In 1890 he was called to the bar at the Inner Temple.

In 1889 he wrote Railways of England followed in the following year by Railways of Scotland. These two books comprised a series of descriptive articles of the railways, but his later work concentrated on the economics and statistics of the industry. He visited the United States where he studied the statistical methods used on the railroads there, and on his return wrote his third book, Railways and the Traders (1891), which was critical of the accounting practices of the British railway companies. From the mid-1890s he lectured at the newly formed London School of Economics on railways. In 1905 he published his fourth book The Elements of Railway Economics, which was widely used as a textbook. In 1919 he gave evidence to the United States Congress before the Joint Committee on Inter-State and Foreign Commerce. His testimony formed the basis of his fifth and final book, State Railway Ownership, was published in 1920.

He maintained his connections with the Conservative Party, and was adopted as their candidate for Keighley in the West Riding of Yorkshire. He contested the seat on three occasions in 1906, 1910 and 1911 but failed to be elected.

His expertise led him to serve on the Royal Commission on Accidents to Railway Servant (1899), the Vice-Regal Commission on Irish Railways (1906), the Royal Commission of Enquiry into Canadian Railways (1916), the Royal Commission on South Rhodesian Railways (1918). He was also appointed a director of the Underground Electric Railways of London and of the Midland and South Western Junction Railway.

In 1921 Acworth was knighted and appointed chairman of the Committee on Indian Railways. The report of the committee, known as the "Acworth Report", led to reorganisation of railways, and the creation of a separate Railway Budget, an arrangement which is absent in British India. He was appointed a Knight Commander of the Star of India in 1922. In 1923 he prepared a report on Austrian railways for the League of Nations.

He was married twice. In 1878 he married Elizabeth Louisa Oswald Brown, who died in 1904. In 1923 he married Elizabeth Learmonth Wotherspoon.

In 1924 he was given the task of reorganising the German Railways by the Inter-Allied Reparations Commission. The heavy workload led to a deterioration in his health, and he died suddenly at his London home at The Albany, Piccadilly, aged 74.
