= 1913 Keighley by-election =

UK parliamentary by-election

11 November 1913

Keighley constituency
- Turnout: 86.5%

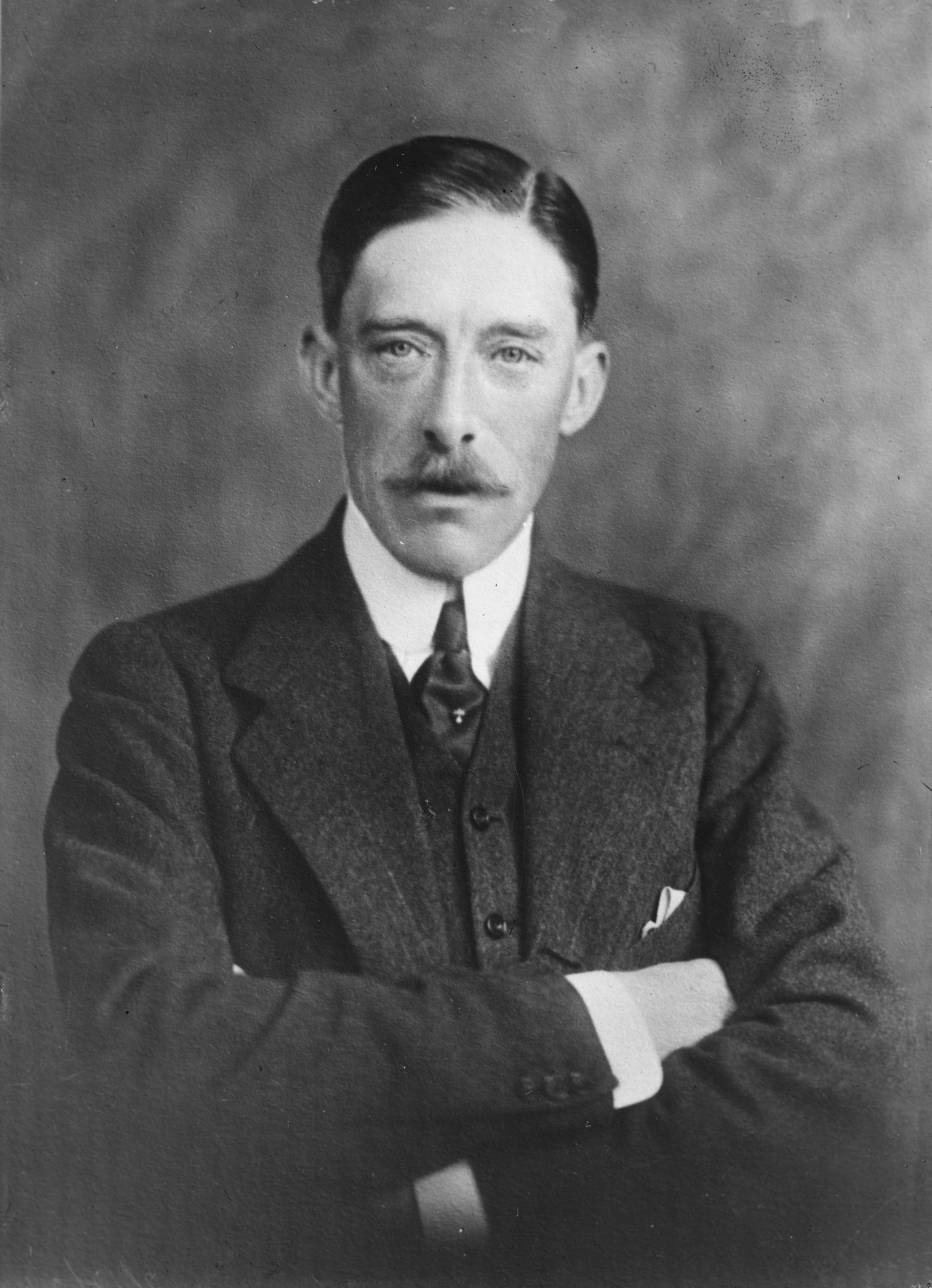

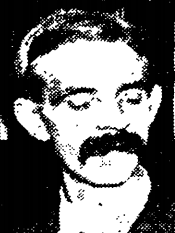
	First party	Second party	Third party
Candidate	Stanley Buckmaster	The Viscount Lascelles	William Bland
Party	Liberal	Unionist	Labour
Popular vote	4,730	3,852	3,646
Percentage	38.7%	31.5%	29.8%
Swing	▼0.3 pp	▼0.6 pp	▲0.9 pp
MP before election
Stanley Buckmaster
Liberal
Elected MP
Stanley Buckmaster
Liberal

The 1913 Keighley by-election was a Parliamentary by-election held on 11 November 1913. The constituency returned one Member of Parliament (MP) to the House of Commons of the United Kingdom, elected by the first past the post voting system.

The incumbent, Sir Stanley Buckmaster of the Liberal Party, had been elected for the constituency in the 1911 Keighley by-election. He was required to fight another by-election on his appointment as Solicitor General for England and Wales. Henry Lascelles, Viscount Lascelles, the 30-year old heir to the Earl of Harewood, whose peerage he succeeded to in 1929, and future husband of Mary, Princess Royal, was the candidate for the Conservative Party. William Bland, a local trade unionist member of local Independent Labour Party was endorsed by the national Labour Party to fight in the by-election.

The Liberal Party held the seat as Buckmaster was re-elected.

== Result ==
Keighley by-election, 1913
Party	Candidate	Votes	%	±%
Liberal	Stanley Buckmaster	4,730	38.7	−0.3
Unionist	Henry Lascelles, Viscount Lascelles	3,852	31.5	−0.6
Labour	William Bland	3,646	29.8	+0.9
Majority		878	7.2	+0.1
Turnout		12,228	86.5	
Registered electors		14,142		
Liberal hold		Swing	+0.2	

== Previous election ==
1911 Keighley by-election
Party	Candidate	Votes	%	±%
Liberal	Stanley Buckmaster	4,667	39.0	N/A
Conservative	William Mitchell Acworth	3,842	32.1	N/A
Labour	William Crawford Anderson	3,452	28.9	N/A
Majority		825	7.1	N/A
Turnout		11,961	87.3	N/A
Liberal hold		Swing	N/A	

== Aftermath ==
A General Election was due to take place by the end of 1915. The Yorkshire branch of the Independent Labour Party were keen to run a candidate. Due to the outbreak of war, the election never took place.

General Election 1914/15
Party	Candidate	Votes	%	±%
Registered electors		14,400		

Another by-election occurred in Keighley in 1915 when Buckmaster accepted a seat in the House of Lords.
