= John Grogan (politician) =

British politician (born 1961)

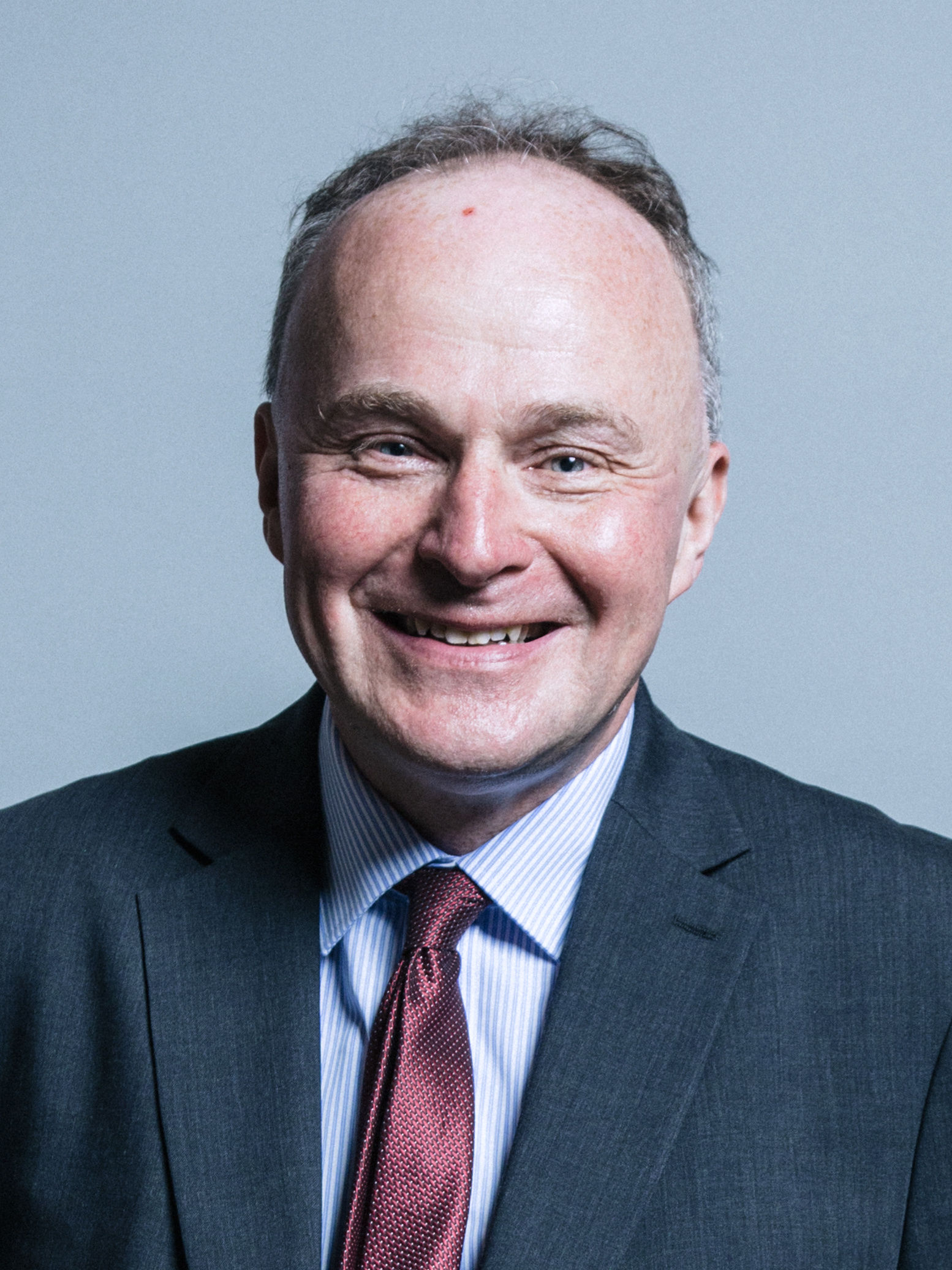
- Official portrait, 2017

Member of Parliament for Keighley
- In office 8 June 2017 – 6 November 2019
- Preceded by: Kris Hopkins
- Succeeded by: Robbie Moore

Member of Parliament for Selby
- In office 1 May 1997 – 12 April 2010
- Preceded by: Michael Alison
- Succeeded by: Nigel Adams (Note: As MP for Selby and Ainsty.)

Personal details
- Born: John Timothy Grogan; 24 February 1961 (age 65) Halifax, West Riding of Yorkshire, England
- Party: Labour
- Education: St John's College, Oxford (BA)
- Website: Official website

John Timothy Grogan (born 24 February 1961) is a British Labour Party politician, who was the Member of Parliament (MP) for Selby between 1997 and 2010 and for Keighley between 2017 and 2019. He is currently chair of the Mongolian–British Chamber of Commerce (MBCC).

== Early life ==
Born in Halifax, West Riding of Yorkshire, Grogan was educated at St Michael's RC College, a Jesuit school in Leeds and St John's College, Oxford. He graduated with a Bachelor of Arts degree in Modern History and Economics in 1982, and also served as the first President of the Oxford University Student Union, the first to be elected on a Labour Party (UK) platform.

He worked as a communications coordinator with the Leeds City Council from 1987 to 1994 before setting up his own conference business from 1996 to 1997. He worked for the Labour Party in various capacities in both Leeds and Wolverhampton. He also acted as the Labour Party press officer in the European Parliament at Brussels in 1995.

== Parliamentary career ==
=== Selby (1997–2010) ===
Grogan unsuccessfully contested the North Yorkshire seat of Selby at the 1987 general election against the Conservative MP Michael Alison, losing by 13,779 votes. He contested the seat for the second time at the 1992 general election but was again defeated by Alison, this time by 9,508 votes.

Between the 1987 and 1992 elections, he also stood unsuccessfully to become a Member of the European Parliament for York in 1989.

Grogan was then elected to the House of Commons at the 1997 general election for Selby. As the incumbent Alison had retired at the election, he defeated the former Conservative MP for West Lancashire, Kenneth Hind, who had lost his seat in 1992, with a majority of 3,836. He made his maiden speech on 7 July 1997.

He led the campaign to save the Selby Coalfield in 2002. In 1999, he called for a memorial to the heroism of women during World War II to be remembered on the empty plinth in Trafalgar Square, with the campaign gaining the backing of the then Speaker of the House of Commons, Betty Boothroyd, and the Princess Royal. Although the campaign was unsuccessful a monument has since been erected in Whitehall.

In the 2005 general election, he retained his seat with a reduced majority of 467 votes, making the seat the 15th most marginal Labour-held seat in the UK. In Parliament, Grogan served on the Northern Ireland Affairs Select Committee from 1997 to 2001 and from 2005 to 2010.

In 2009, Grogan gained national coverage for his campaign against the proposed options for the privatisation of Royal Mail. detention of suspects for 42 days, gambling deregulation,

Grogan helped lead the rebellion on the Racial and Religious Hatred Act 2006, resulting in two Government defeats on the bill and 'threatening' rather than 'insulting' behaviour being established as the test of religious hatred. At the public bill committee stage of the Flood and Water Management Act 2010 he proposed an amendment, winning 8–7 against the Government. This ensured that the Regional Flood and Coastal Management Committees retained the power to approve the Environment Agency's flood management bill rather than just the right to be consulted about it.

He campaigned against the proposed expansion of Heathrow Airport, the top-up tuition fee reforms in 2004 and voted against the UK's involvement in the Iraq War in 2003. While serving as an MP, he also campaigned for reform of the licensing laws, the smoking ban, bus regulation and public service broadcasting. Grogan also campaigned for the protection of the rights of agency workers, the regulation of lobbyists and access for all to sporting listed events on free-to-air TV. He was also the chairman of the All-Party Parliamentary Groups on the BBC, Beer and Mongolia.

While serving as the MP for Selby, Grogan also supported the building of a new by-pass for Selby, as well as a new hospital and the expansion of its flood defences.

In 2006, Grogan confirmed he would not contest the next general election after boundary changes were made to his Selby Constituency.

During and after the 2009 expenses scandal, Grogan was criticised by The Daily Telegraph for claiming £150.00 on parliamentary expenses for English language tuition for a Mongolian intern. The expense was reported by the newspaper to have been incurred in order for the intern to be able to "understand his [Mr Grogan's] constituents' Yorkshire accents".

In 2010 Grogan and Tom Watson led parliamentary opposition on the Government benches to the Digital Economy Bill and the parliamentary campaign to save BBC Radio 6 Music and the BBC Asian Network from closure.

=== Keighley (2017–2019) ===
In 2013, Grogan was selected as the Labour candidate for Keighley for the 2015 general election. He lost to the Conservative candidate Kris Hopkins by a margin of 3,053 votes. He re-fought the seat in the 2017 general election, winning with a majority of 239 votes.

==== Local causes ====
In Keighley Grogan championed a variety of causes including a new police station, the survival of rugby league club Keighley Cougars, a refurbished railway station, the campaign to re-open the Skipton-Colne railway line and the campaign against a planned incinerator. In neighbouring Ilkley he worked closely with the Clean River Group to stop the discharge of raw sewage into the River Wharfe and to apply to the Department of the Environment for designated bathing status.

==== In Parliament ====
In 2018 Grogan was the only Labour MP to vote against his party's amendments to the Data Protection Act 2018 on the grounds that they threatened press freedom. In Parliament he also helped revive campaigns to expand the number of listed sporting events not permitted to be broadcast solely on pay television services and for trains to be run on Boxing Day. He chaired the All Party Parliamentary Groups on Albania, Kosovo, Mongolia, Peru and Portugal.

Grogan is a longstanding supporter of Yorkshire Devolution and since 2018 he has been co-chair of the One Yorkshire Committee, which brings together Members of Parliament, council leaders, businesses and trade unions to campaign for Devolution across the whole of Yorkshire.

Grogan is a signatory of the MPs Not Border Guards pledge, which vows to not report constituents to the Home Office for immigration enforcement.

He is a member of Labour Friends of Israel as well as Labour Friends of Palestine & the Middle East.

Grogan lost his Keighley seat in the 2019 general election to the Conservative candidate Robbie Moore. In November 2022, he was elected by members as the prospective parliamentary candidate in Keighley and Ilkley for the 2024 general election. In the election he was defeated again by Robbie Moore, who won against the national swing.

== Outside politics ==
From 2013 to 2015 Grogan chaired the Hatfield Colliery Trust, which was responsible for the employee-owned mine near Doncaster. This was the penultimate coal mine to close in the United Kingdom.

== Notes ==
Parliament of the United Kingdom
Preceded by Michael Alison	Member of Parliament for Selby; 1997–2010	Constituency abolished
Preceded by Kris Hopkins	Member of Parliament for Keighley; 2017–2019	Succeeded by Robbie Moore
