= Campaign for Social Democracy =

Campaign in 1974 British election

The Campaign for Social Democracy was a minor political party which ran candidates in the February 1974 United Kingdom general election.

== History ==
The party was formed in September 1973 by Dick Taverne, who had resigned from the Labour Party, after falling out with his Constituency Labour Party over the European Economic Community.

Taverne had formed the Democratic Labour Association in Lincoln and had been elected as an MP for Lincoln under that banner in a by-election in March, 1973. He formed the Campaign for Social Democracy as an attempt to build a radical non-doctrinaire social democratic movement, and at the February 1974 general election they stood four candidates against leading Labour left-wingers, including Tony Benn.

All candidates were unsuccessful, with the highest polling at 2.4% of the vote in their constituency. The campaign ended when the Labour Party won the October 1974 United Kingdom general election, making a split in the Labour Party less likely. Such a split did occur in the early-1980s, when leading moderates in the Labour Party formed the Social Democratic Party.

== Election results ==
The party's results were:

Constituency	Candidate	Votes	%	Position
Bristol South East	James Hugh Robertson	668	1.2	5
Keighley	John Binns	348	0.8	4
Penistone	Martin Eaden	867	1.6	4
Tottenham	J. Martin	763	2.5	6
