= John Binns (British politician) =

British politician

John Binns (June 1914 – 6 August 1986) was a British Labour Party politician. He was Member of Parliament for the marginal Keighley constituency from 1964 to 1970, when it was won by Conservative Joan Hall.

During the Parliamentary debate on the 1968 Race Relations Act he refused to support the government, calling the bill 'just cant and hypocrisy'.

Binns contested Keighley again in the February 1974 election for the Campaign for Social Democracy, but finished fourth behind the Liberal candidate.

Parliament of the United Kingdom
| Preceded by Marcus Worsley | Member of Parliament for Keighley; 1964–1970 | Succeeded by Joan Hall |
