= Joan Hall (British politician) =

British Conservative politician and secretary (1935–2026)

Joan Valerie Hall CBE

Member of Parliament for Keighley
- In office 18 June 1970 – 8 February 1974
- Preceded by: John Binns
- Succeeded by: Bob Cryer

Personal details
- Born: 31 August 1935 Yorkshire, England
- Died: 27 January 2026 (aged 90)
- Party: Conservative

Joan Valerie Hall, CBE (31 August 1935 – 27 January 2026) was a British Conservative Party politician and secretary.

== Early life and education ==
Hall was born in Yorkshire on 31 August 1935. She was educated at Queen Margaret's School, York.

== Career ==
At the 1970 general election she was elected member of parliament (MP) for the marginal seat of Keighley with a majority of 616 votes, becoming its first female MP. However, at the February 1974 election, she lost by 878 votes to the Labour candidate, Bob Cryer.

Hall served as PPS to Anthony Stodart, Minister of State at the Ministry of Agriculture.

She was a staunch supporter of Margaret Thatcher in her battle with Edward Heath for the leadership of the Conservative Party, and acted as Thatcher's chauffeur.

== Death ==
Hall died on 27 January 2026, at the age of 90.

== Sources ==
- Times Guide to the House of Commons February 1974
- Leigh Rayment's Historical List of MPs

Parliament of the United Kingdom
Preceded by John Binns	Member of Parliament for Keighley; 1970 – February 1974	Succeeded by Bob Cryer
