= Kris Hopkins =

British Conservative politician (born 1963)

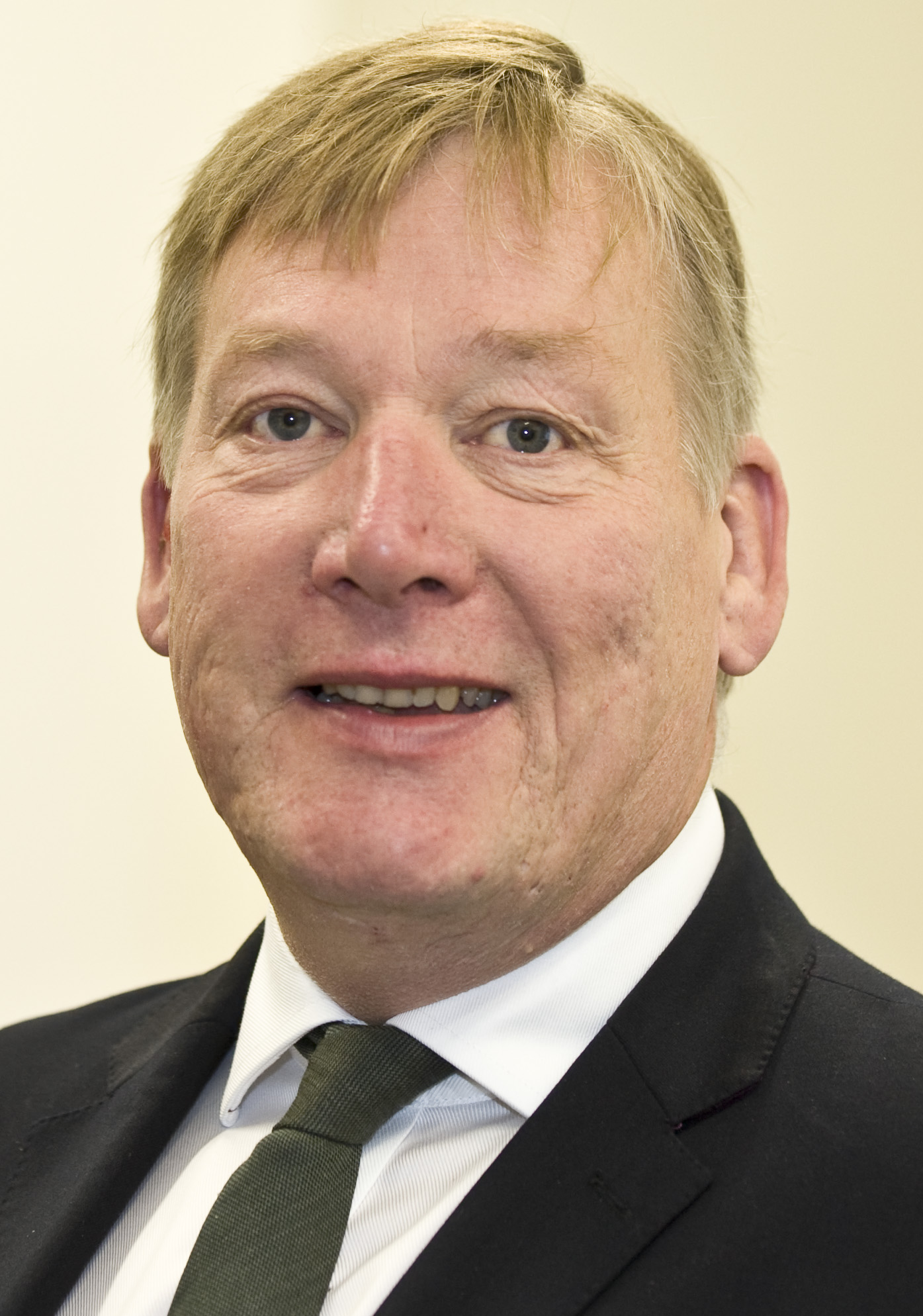
- Hopkins in 2015

Minister of State for Northern Ireland
- In office 17 July 2016 – 9 June 2017
- Prime Minister: Theresa May
- Preceded by: Ben Wallace
- Succeeded by: Chloe Smith

Vice-Chamberlain of the Household
- In office 11 May 2015 – 17 July 2016
- Prime Minister: David Cameron
- Preceded by: Anne Milton
- Succeeded by: Julian Smith

Parliamentary Under-Secretary for Communities and Local Government
- In office 15 July 2014 – 11 May 2015
- Prime Minister: David Cameron
- Preceded by: Brandon Lewis
- Succeeded by: Baroness Williams of Trafford

Minister of State for Housing and Local Government
- In office 7 October 2013 – 15 July 2014
- Prime Minister: David Cameron
- Preceded by: Mark Prisk
- Succeeded by: Brandon Lewis

Member of Parliament for Keighley
- In office 6 May 2010 – 3 May 2017
- Preceded by: Ann Cryer
- Succeeded by: John Grogan

Personal details
- Born: 8 June 1963 (age 63)
- Party: Conservative
- Education: Leeds Trinity University
- Website: www.krishopkins.co.uk

Military service
- Allegiance: United Kingdom
- Rank: Private
- Unit: Duke of Wellington's Regiment

Kristan Frederick Hopkins (born 8 June 1963) is a British Conservative Party politician, who started his working life at Comet electrical store in Keighley. In the early 1980's worked as a doorman at the Airedale Heifer public house. He was formerly the Member of Parliament for Keighley in West Yorkshire. Elected in 2010, he served as Vice-Chamberlain of the Household, a government whip. He was previously Parliamentary Under Secretary of State for Department for Communities and Local Government and the former housing minister. He lost his seat in the 2017 general election.

== Military career ==
Hopkins served in Kenya, Northern Ireland and Germany as a Private in the Duke of Wellington's Regiment.

== Academic career ==
According to his CV, on leaving the Army he completed a degree in communications and cultural studies at Leeds University before going on to lecture in media theory, communications and digital media. His CV gives neither dates nor places for any of these activities. He actually studied at Trinity and All Saints College in Horsforth, Leeds (now Leeds Trinity University). The college's degrees at that time were awarded externally by the University of Leeds.

== Political career ==
Before being elected, Hopkins had stood twice for Parliament: he was second both to Linda Riordan in the 2005 election for the seat of Halifax, and (previously) in West Yorkshire and for the Leeds West Constituency in 2001.

Before his election to Parliament, Hopkins had been a member of Bradford Council since 1998, rising to become the council's deputy leader in 2004 and leader in 2006.

In 2012, Hopkins alleged that some Muslim gangs were targeting young white girls for rape, saying: "if we deny that fact in this House then the BNP and everybody else climbs on board" and suggested that law enforcement was hindered in pursuing them by "political correctness".

In October 2013, Hopkins was appointed Minister for Housing. Conservative Party colleague Nadine Dorries called the promotion of Hopkins to a junior ministerial posts "a really awful decision", describing him on Twitter as "one of parliament's slimiest, nastiest MP's". Thérèse Coffey defended Hopkins, describing him as "authentic and brave"

In the July 2014 reshuffle, Hopkins became minister for local government and adult social care.

Following the May 2015 general election, Hopkins was appointed Vice-Chamberlain of the Household – a senior position within the whips' office. He was a losing candidate in the general election of 8 June 2017. He later became a Special Adviser at the Northern Ireland Office.

Parliament of the United Kingdom
Preceded by Ann Cryer	Member of Parliament for Keighley; 2010–2017	Succeeded by John Grogan
