= Swire Smith =

British politician (1842–1918)

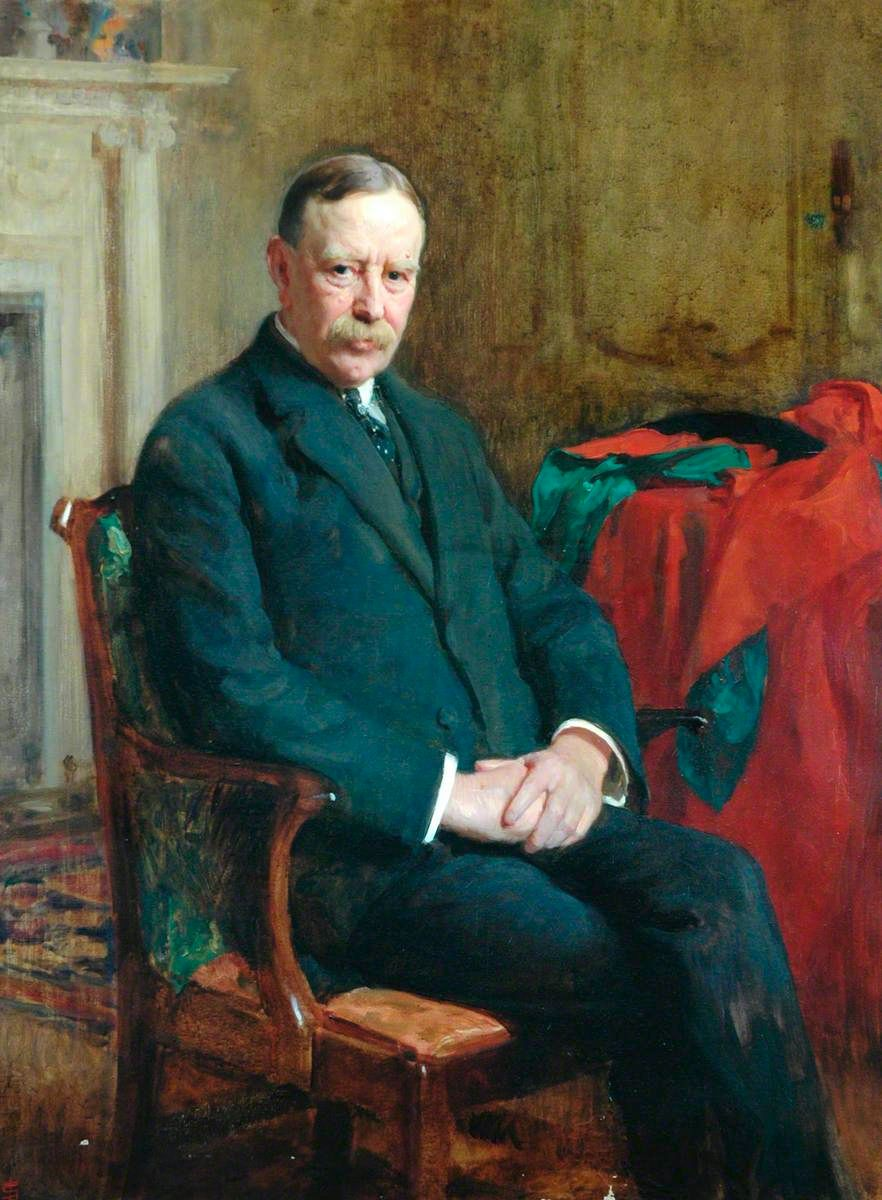
- Smith in 1913
- Born: 4 March 1842; Keighley, West Riding of Yorkshire
- Died: 16 March 1918 (aged 76); London
- Occupations: wool manufacturer, politician

Sir Swire Smith (4 March 1842 – 16 March 1918) was an English woollen manufacturer, educationalist and Liberal Party politician. In many ways he was typical of the public-spirited, self-made Victorian. Of nonconformist lineage, he believed in social and intellectual improvement, the virtues of hard work and thrift and the role of the Liberal Party in the encouragement and promotion of this ethic.

== Family and education ==
Swire Smith was born in Keighley in the West Riding of Yorkshire, the eldest son of George Smith and his wife Mary (née Swire). He was educated at the local National School in Keighley and at Wesley College, Sheffield. He never married.

== Career ==
=== Early career ===
On leaving school Smith served an apprenticeship with a Keighley worsted manufacturer. He soon began to develop his interest in education however and at the age of 24, was appointed honorary secretary to the building committee of the Keighley Institute, a society the object of which was "Mutual Instruction in Mechanics, Experimental Philosophy and Mathematics" which later became the Keighley Boy's Grammar School. He was prominent in the reorganisation of the institute and was largely responsible for the school's gaining in notability.

=== Technical education ===
Smith became an expert in the area of technical education. He was said to have been inspired by a speech given by the author and advocate of self help Dr Samuel Smiles and took up the cause because he presciently believed that Britain was falling behind its international competitors, particularly Germany. He later travelled a good deal in Europe and the USA to develop his understanding and expertise in the field and published a number of pamphlets and press articles on the subject. He was appointed as representative on the Royal Commission on Technical Education which sat from 1881 to 1884, and was a member of the committee of the National Association for Technical Education in which capacity he presented papers to international bodies including to the International Congress on Technical Education.

=== Wool trade and other business ===
Smith also developed a career in the wool trade. He became a mill owner and rose to be a senior partner of a worsted spinning concern in Keighley. He was sometime Warden of the Worshipful Company of Clothworkers. Less successfully however he was also a director of the Land Mortgage Bank of Florida but the bank failed and was liquidated.

== Politics ==
Smith was a Liberal and described himself as a convinced Free Trader. He was a founder of the West Riding Free Trade Federation and an executive member of the national Free Trade Union. He had been elected as a Liberal to the Keighley School Board in 1875 and was its chairman for three years. He was later approached to stand for Parliament, both for the seat of Skipton as well as for his home town of Keighley but had always refused. However he allowed himself to be persuaded to stand as a Liberal for Keighley at a by-election on 29 June 1915 when the sitting member, Stanley Buckmaster was raised to the peerage and appointed Lord Chancellor. He was duly elected MP for Keighley, his election being remarkable for his advanced age at the time of the contest, and he entered the House of Commons at the age of 73.

== Other appointments and honours ==
Smith was knighted in the Queen's birthday honours list of May 1898. He was a Justice of the Peace for the West Riding and for Keighley, Vice Chairman of the Royal Commission on International Exhibitions, a member of the Standing Committee of Advice for Education in Art and in 1912 he was granted the honorary degree of Doctor of Laws by Leeds University. He was made a freeman of Keighley in 1914 and in 1967, Eastwood School in Keighley was renamed the Swire Smith Middle School in his honour and memory.

== Keighley Library ==
Through his friendship with the Scottish-American philanthropist Andrew Carnegie, Smith was instrumental in the founding of Keighley's first public library. In conversation with Carnegie at his home, Skibo Castle in Sutherland, Smith celebrated the success of Keighley's students but lamented the need for a public library in the town to support them. Carnegie promised £10,000 to create such a library on the understanding that Keighley was also willing to help itself and invoke the Public Libraries Act 1850. The borough council provided the site and held a competition to design the building in Edwardian Free Style with Arts and Crafts Movement influence. In 1901 Andrew Carnegie was granted the Freedom of the Borough and Sir Swire Smith laid the library foundation stone in 1902. On 20 August 1904 the new building was opened by the then Duke of Devonshire.

== Death ==
Smith died of congestion of the lungs on 16 March 1918 in a London nursing home after a minor operation on his prostate gland, at the age of 76. His funeral took place at Devonshire Street Congregational Church in Keighley four days later.

Parliament of the United Kingdom
Preceded by Stanley Buckmaster	Member of Parliament for Keighley; 1915 – 1918	Succeeded by William Somervell
