= Robbie Moore (politician) =

British Conservative politician

Robbie Moore MP
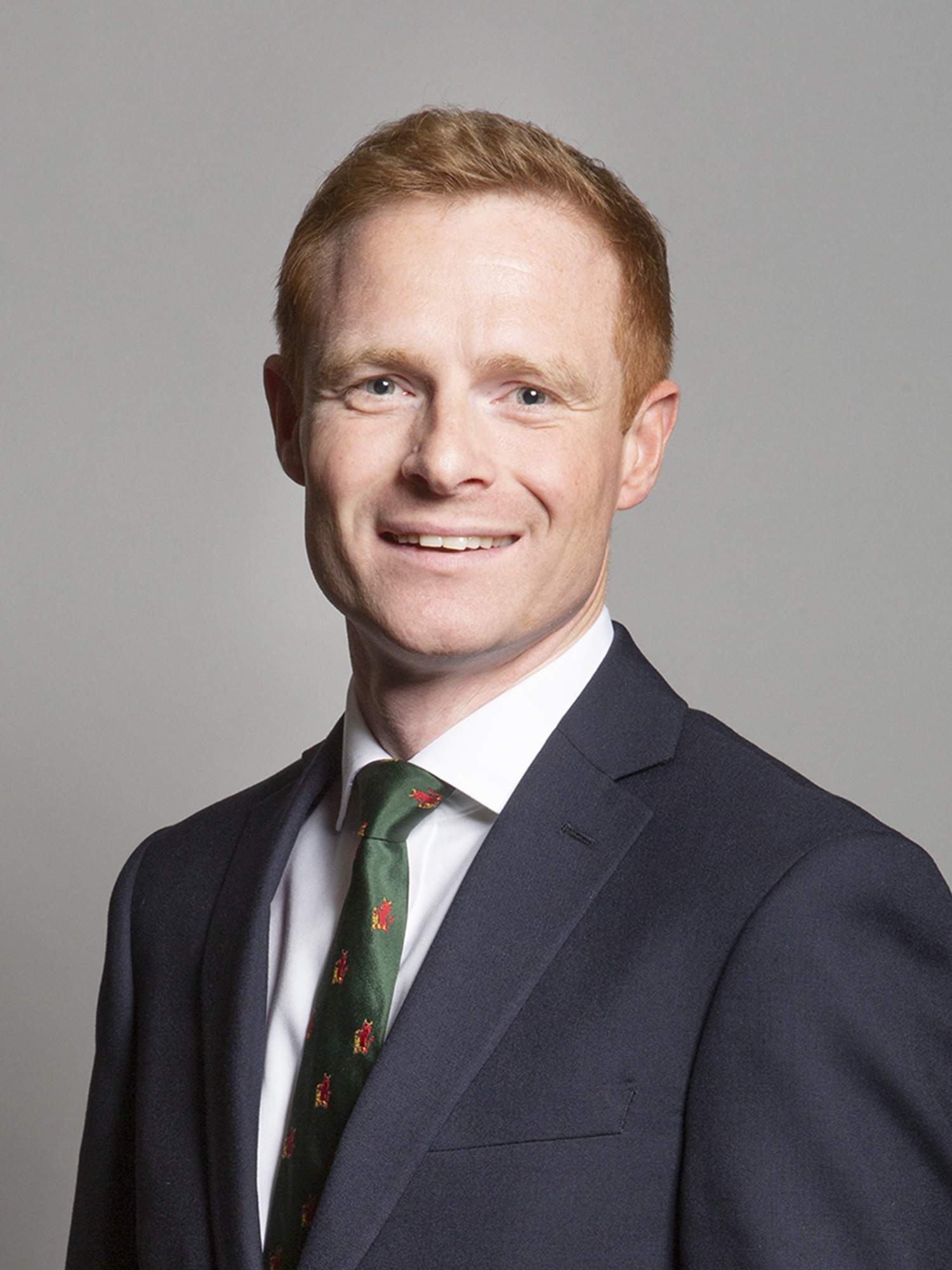

Shadow Minister for Environment, Food and Rural Affairs
- Incumbent
- Assumed office 19 July 2024
- Leader: Rishi Sunak; Kemi Badenoch
- Preceded by: Daniel Zeichner

Parliamentary Under-Secretary of State for Water and Rural Growth
- In office 14 November 2023 – 5 July 2024
- Prime Minister: Rishi Sunak
- Preceded by: The Lord Benyon (Rural Affairs) (Note: As Minister of State for Biosecurity, Marine and Rural Affairs); Rebecca Pow (Water) (Note: As Parliamentary Under-Secretary of State for Environmental Quality and Resilience)
- Succeeded by: Emma Hardy (Water); Daniel Zeichner (Rural Affairs)

Member of Parliament for Keighley and Ilkley Keighley (2019–2024)
- Incumbent
- Assumed office 12 December 2019
- Preceded by: John Grogan
- Majority: 1,625 (3.6%)

Personal details
- Born: Robert Peter Moore; 28 November 1984 (age 41) Market Rasen, Lincolnshire, England
- Party: Conservative
- Education: Newcastle University (BA)
- Occupation: Politician; rural surveyor
- Website: www.robbiemoore.org.uk

Robert Peter Moore (born 28 November 1984) is a British Conservative Party politician, who has been the Member of Parliament (MP) for Keighley and Ilkley, formerly Keighley, in West Yorkshire since the 2019 general election. He has been Shadow Minister for Environment, Food and Rural Affairs since July 2024.

== Early life ==
In 2007, the family set up a plastics-recycling business. He studied architecture at Newcastle University and rural surveying at the University College of Estate Management. A qualified rural chartered surveyor, he set up his own consultancy practice, Brockthorpe Consultancy.

== Political career ==
Before being elected as MP for Keighley in 2019, Moore was a councillor on Alnwick Town Council and represented Alnwick on Northumberland County Council. He unsuccessfully contested the July 2019 by-election for Northumbria Police and Crime Commissioner, but at the general election in December, he gained the marginal seat of Keighley from the Labour incumbent, John Grogan. In the 2024 United Kingdom general election, he defeated Grogan again and was re-elected against the national swing. Moore has served as a member of the Home Affairs Select Committee and Petitions Committee since October 2024.

== Electoral history ==
=== 2024 UK general election ===
General election 2024: Keighley and Ilkley
Party	Candidate	Votes	%	±%
Conservative	Robbie Moore	18,589	40.3	−7.9
Labour	John Grogan	16,964	36.7	−7.2
Reform	Andrew Mark Judson	4,782	10.4	+8.8
Green	John Wood	2,447	5.3	N/A
Independent	Vaz Shabir	2,036	4.4	N/A
Liberal Democrats	Chris Adams	970	2.1	−2.8
Yorkshire	Dominic James Atlas	389	0.8	−0.4
Majority		1,625	3.6	−0.6
Turnout		46,177	62.1	−10.0
Registered electors		74,367		
Conservative hold		Swing	▼0.3	

=== 2019 UK general election ===
General election 2019: Keighley
Party	Candidate	Votes	%	±%
Conservative	Robbie Moore	25,298	48.1	+2.0
Labour	John Grogan	23,080	43.9	−2.6
Liberal Democrats	Tom Franks	2,573	4.9	+2.5
Brexit Party	Waqas Khan	850	1.6	N/A
Yorkshire	Mark Barton	667	1.3	N/A
SDP	Matthew Rose	132	0.3	N/A
Majority		2,218	4.2	N/A
Turnout		52,600	72.3	−0.1
Conservative gain from Labour		Swing	+2.3	

=== 2019 Northumbria Police and Crime Commissioner by-election ===
2019 Northumbria Police and Crime Commissioner election
Party	Candidate	1st round		2nd round			1st round votesTransfer votes, 2nd round
Party	Candidate	Total	Of round	Transfers	Total	Of round	1st round votesTransfer votes, 2nd round
Labour	Kim McGuinness	58,355	37.9%	8,977	67,332	52.2%	
Independent	Georgina Hill	33,704	21.9%	27,929	61,633	47.8%	
Conservative	Robbie Moore	33,267	21.6%				
Liberal Democrats	Jonathan Wallace	28,623	18.6%				
Turnout		155,990	15.0%				
Rejected ballots		2,041	1.3%				
Total votes		153,949					
Registered electors		1,041,562					
Labour hold							

=== 2017 Northumberland County Council election ===
2017 Northumberland County Council election: Alnwick (2 seats)
Party	Candidate	Votes	%	±%
Conservative	Gordon Castle*	1,929	30.38	+10.35
Conservative	Robbie Moore	1,295	20.39	+6.77
Liberal Democrats	Lydia Heather Cairns*	959	15.10	−2.80
Labour	James Matthewson	688	10.83	+6.18
Labour	Bill Grisdale	594	9.35	+1.16
Liberal Democrats	Andrew Eoin Duff	457	7.20	−9.30
UKIP	Michael John Weatheritt	241	3.80	−6.75
UKIP	Margaret Weatheritt	187	2.95	−5.61
Majority		336	5.29	+3.89
Turnout		6,350		
Conservative hold		Swing		
Conservative gain from Liberal Democrats		Swing		

Parliament of the United Kingdom
Preceded by John Grogan	Member of Parliament for Keighley and Ilkley (formerly Keighley); 2019–present	Incumbent
