= Railway budget of India =

Annual Financial Statement of the state-owned Indian Railways

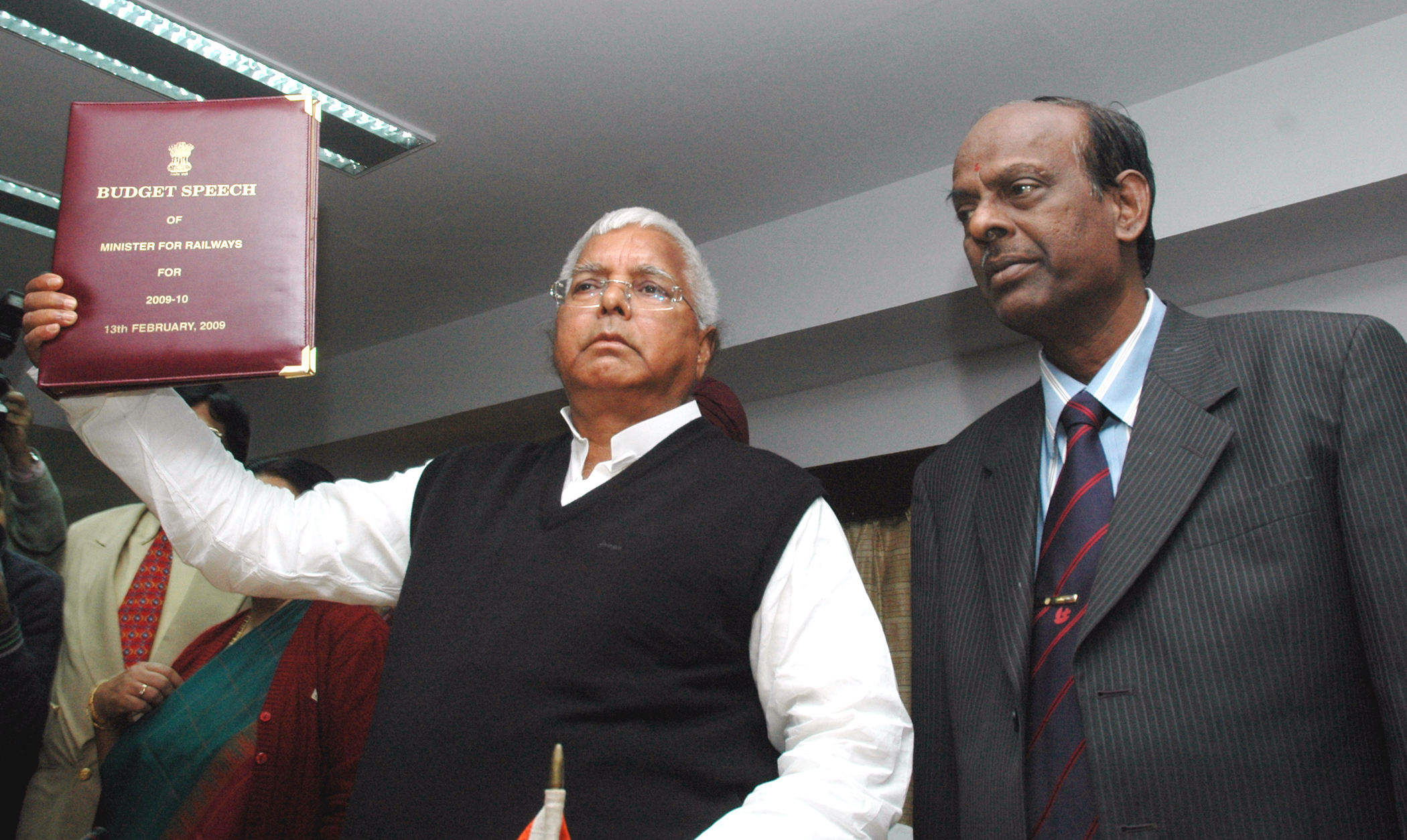
Minister of Railways, Lalu Prasad after giving final touches to the Railway Budget 2009–10, in New Delhi on February 12, 2009

Railway budget of India was the Annual Financial Statement for Indian Railways administered by the Railway Board, which handles rail transport in India. It was presented every year by the Minister of Railways, representing the Ministry of Railways, in the Parliament.

The Railway Budget was presented every year, a few days before the Union budget, till 2016. Modi government on 21 September 2016 approved merger of the Rail and General budgets from the next year, ending a 92-year-old practice of a separate budget for the nation's largest transporter.The decision to merge the Railway Budget with the Union Budget was made in 2016, following the submission of a white paper titled 'Dispensing with the Railway Budget' by the NITI Aayog Committee chaired by Bibek Debroy. The paper was presented to Railways Minister Suresh Prabhu said that this merger proposal was in the long term interest of railways as well as the country's economy and was a colonial practice that needed to be ended.

== History ==
Following the recommendation of the Acworth Committee in 1920–21, headed by British railway economist William Acworth The "Acworth Report" led to reorganisation of railways, and the railway finances were separated from the general government finances in 1924. After that, in 1924, the budget was announced, a practice that continued till 2016.

John Matthai presented the first Railway Budget for Independent India on 20 November 1947, the Interim Railway Budget. Then, just 3 months later, he presented his second Railway Budget on 24 February 1948 where revised estimates showed a fall in earnings of about 8 crores rupees as compared with the budget estimates.

Jagjivan Ram and Nirmala Sitharaman the current Finance Minister under the Modi Government 3.0 have presented the railway budget most 7 times.

The first live telecast took place on 24 March 1994.

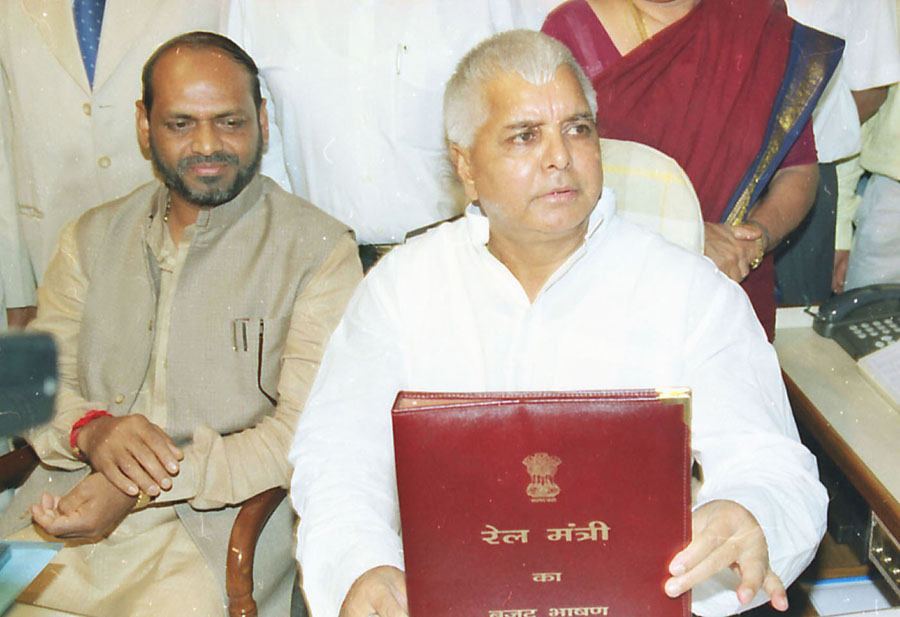
The Union Minister of Railways Lalu Prasad giving finishing touches to the Railway Budget, 2004 - 2005 in New Delhi on July 5, 2004

Lalu Prasad Yadav, who remained Railways Minister from 2004 to May 2009, presented the railway budget 6 times in a row. In 2009, under his tenure a ₹108 billion (US$1.1 billion) budget was passed.

In the year 1999, Mamata Banerjee (later Chief Minister of West Bengal) became the first female Railway Minister. In 2000, she became the first female to present the Railway budget and is the only woman to do so for two different governing coalitions (NDA and UPA).

In 2014 budget, Railway Minister D. V. Sadananda Gowda announced the first bullet train and 9 High-Speed Rail routes.

The last Railway Budget was presented on 25 February 2016 by Mr. Suresh Prabhu.

== Gallery ==
Traditions included the Railway Minister making final changes to the budget, carrying the briefcase with the budget documents, and attending an after budget press meet.

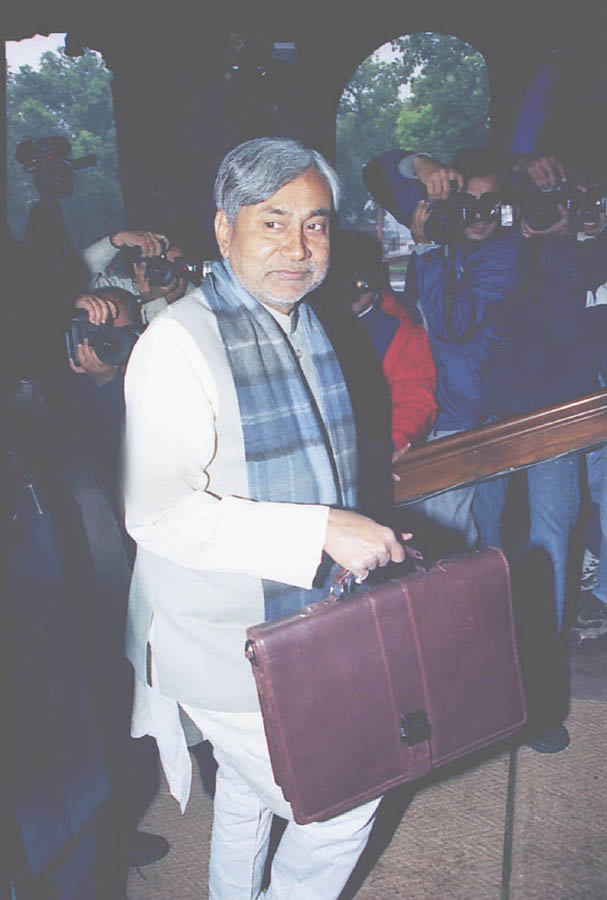
The then Union Minister for Railways, Nitish Kumar entering the Parliament to present the Interim Railway Budget (2004-05) in New Delhi on January 30, 2004

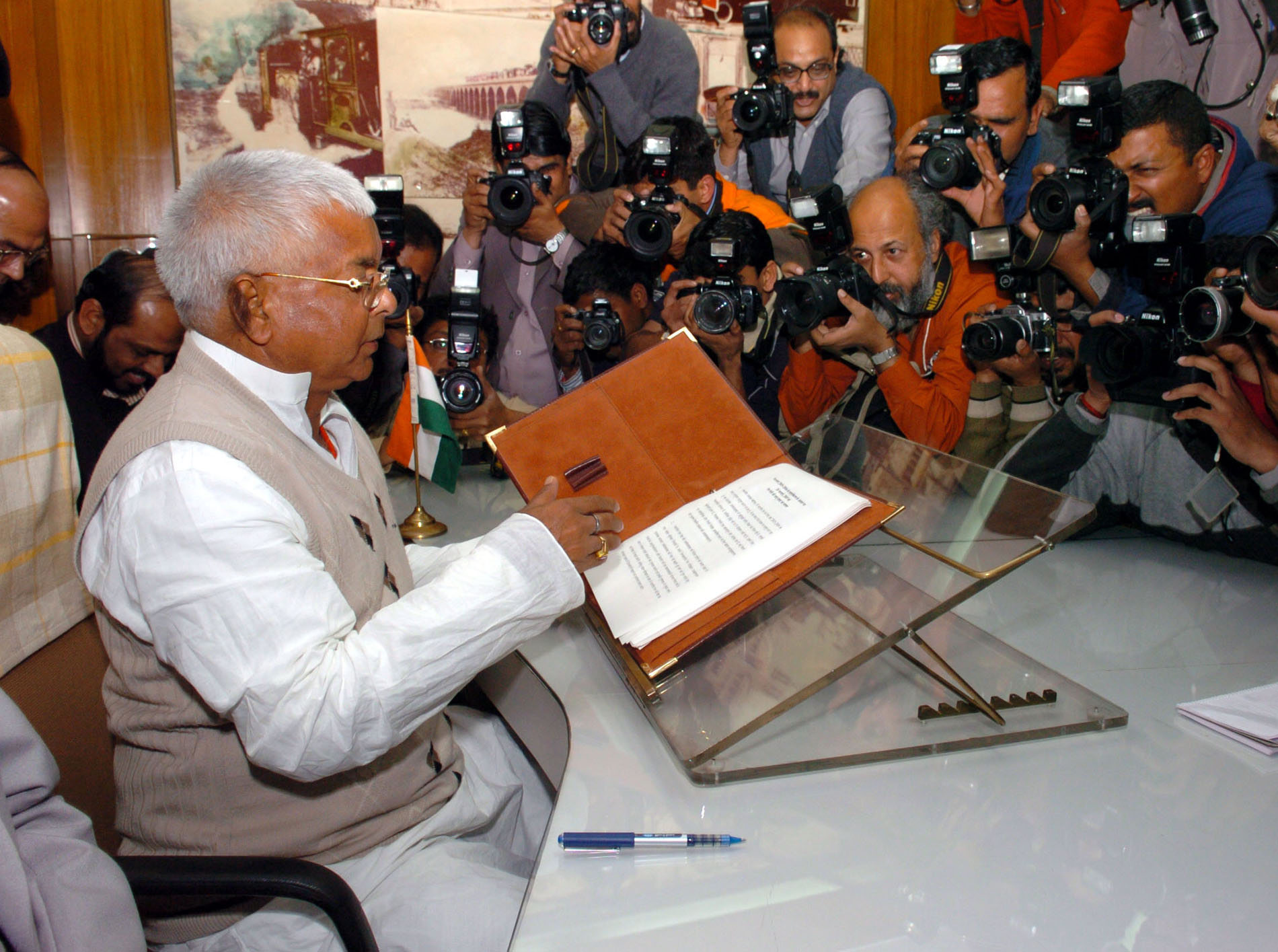
The then Union Minister for Railways, Lalu Prasad giving finishing touches to the Railway Budget of 2005-06 in New Delhi on February 25, 2005

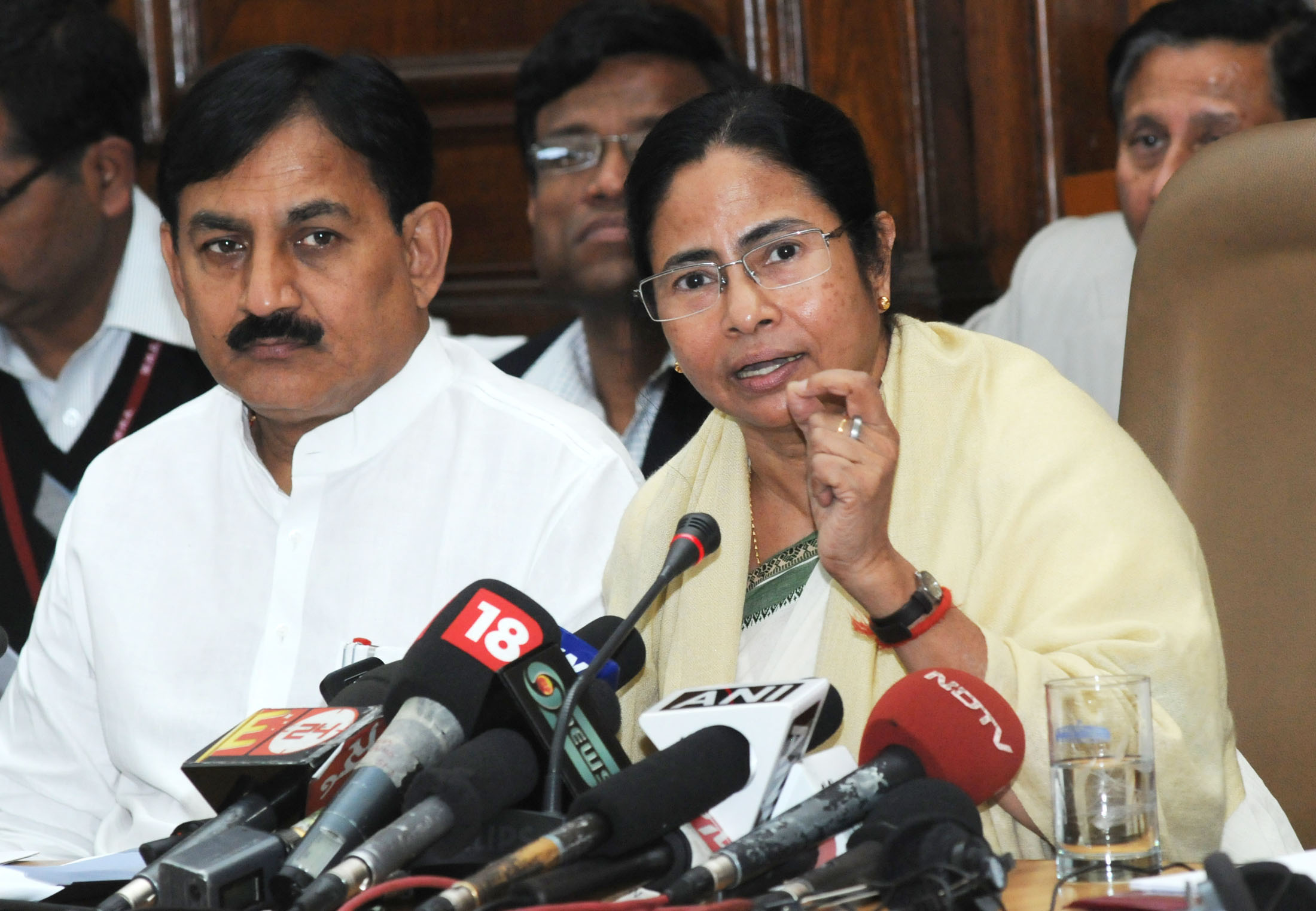
The then Union Minister for Railways, Mamata Banerjee interacting with the media persons after presentation of the Railway Budget of 2011-12, in New Delhi on February 25, 2011

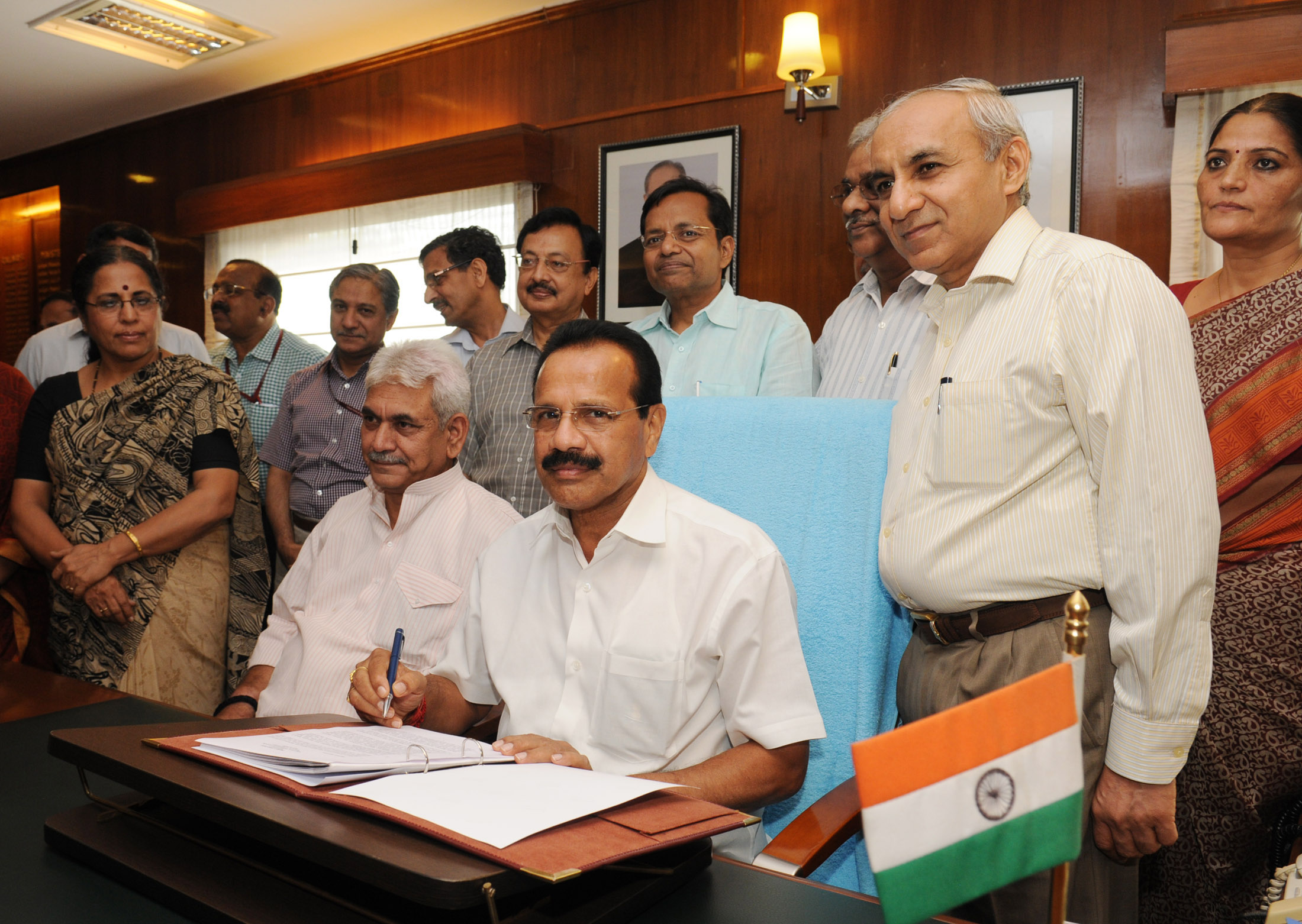
D.V. Sadananda Gowda and Manoj Sinha, the then Minister of State for Railways, giving finishing touches to the Railway Budget 2014-15, in New Delhi

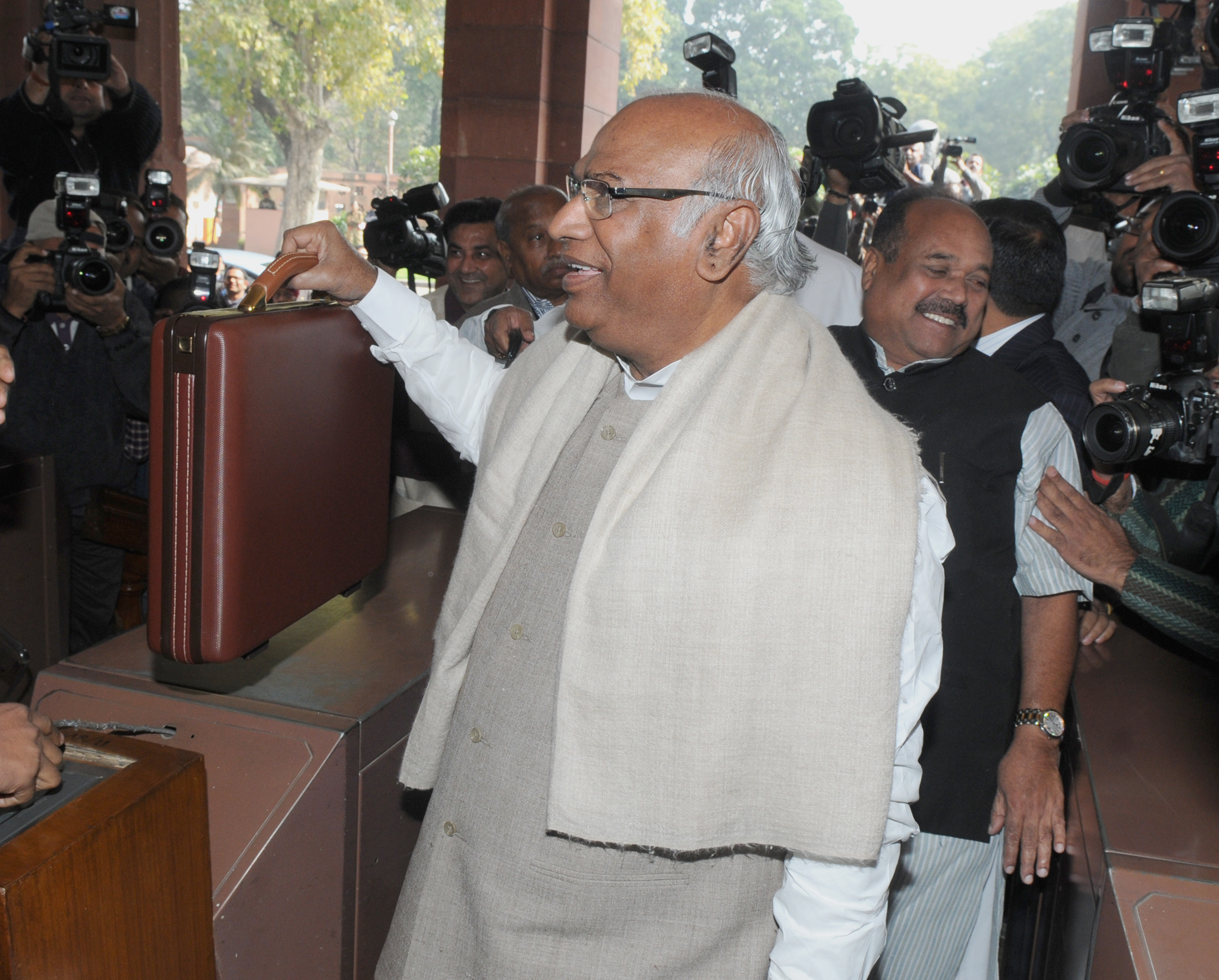
The then Union Minister for Railways, Mallikarjun Kharge arriving at the Parliament House to present the Interim Railway Budget of 2014-15, in New Delhi on February 12, 2014

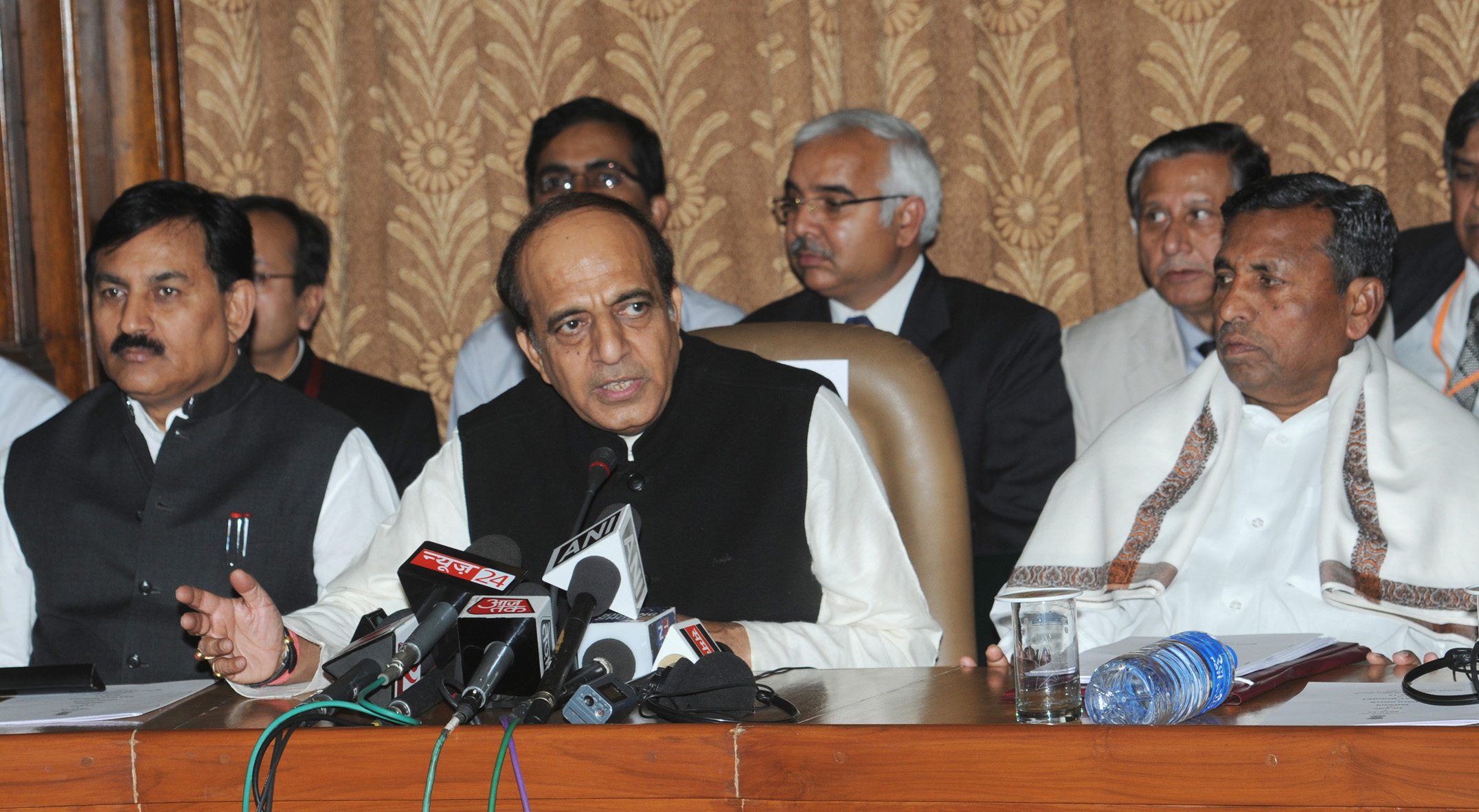
Dinesh Trivedi interacting with the media persons after presentation of the Railway Budget of 2012-13, in New Delhi.

== See also ==
- Union budget of India
- Military budget of India
