= Packhorse Inn =

Farmhouse in Southstoke, Somerset, England

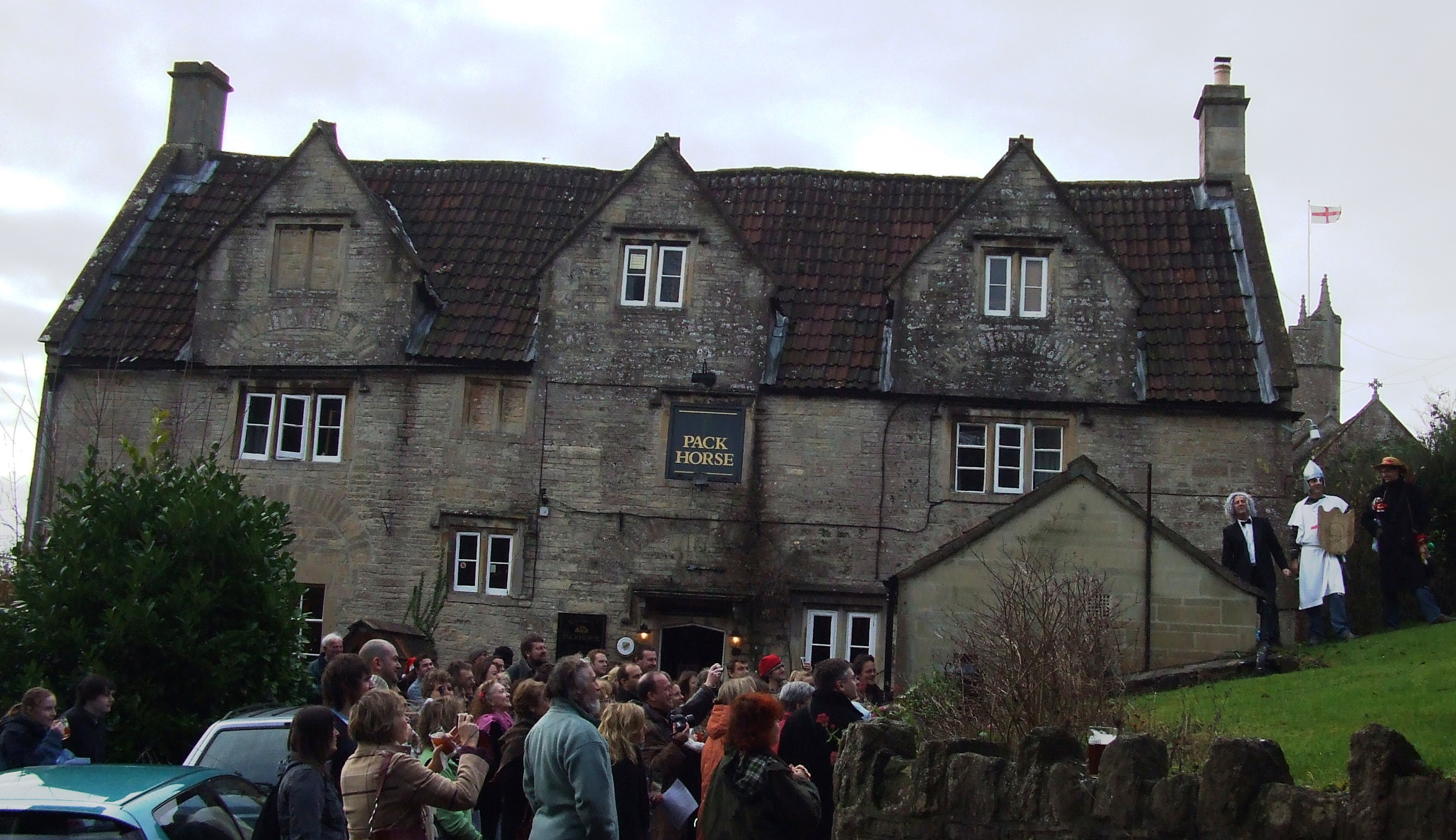

- Location within Somerset
- 51.3496°N 2.3646°W
- Location: Southstoke, Somerset, England

Listed Building – Grade II
- Official name: Packhorse Inn
- Designated: 1 February 1956
- Reference no.: 1232550

The Packhorse Inn in Southstoke within the English county of Somerset is a Grade II listed building which was largely rebuilt in 1674. It was changed from a farmhouse to a pub in the 19th century but closed in 2012. A local campaign has achieved designation as an asset of community value has raised money to renovate it. The pub reopened in March 2018.

== History ==
The building existed as a farmhouse although its date of construction is unknown. It was rebuilt in 1674 when the date was carved into a stone over the front door. It became a pub in the mid 19th century, although another building in the village had previously been known as "The Packhorse Inn". In 1939 the licensee was Mrs Emily Rose. The inn was owned by George’s Brewery.

It closed as a pub in 2012 and was sold with plans being submitted to turn it into a private house. A campaign has been instigated by the local population to save the pub and they successfully campaigned to have it designated as an asset of community value by Bath and North East Somerset council. This provides some protection from development under the Localism Act 2011.

The campaign group organised a share issue with over 200 investors raising £601,000 and made plans for the refurbishment and reopening of the pub. By September 2016 the total raised reached £685,000, enough to buy the building.

In March 2018 the pub reopened.

== Architecture ==
The two-storey stone building has freestone quoins and a tiled roof. The gabled dormers contain attics. Underneath the building is a cellar. It has a taproom which can seat 20 people and a lounge bar for another 20 with a large garden.
