= Stanley Buckmaster, 1st Viscount Buckmaster =

British politician and Lord Chancellor (1861–1934)

The Right Honourable The Viscount Buckmaster GCVO PC
- Buckmaster c. 1910

Lord Chancellor
- In office 25 May 1915 – 5 December 1916
- Monarch: George V
- Prime Minister: H. H. Asquith
- Preceded by: The Viscount Haldane
- Succeeded by: The Lord Finlay

Personal details
- Born: 9 January 1861 London, England
- Died: 5 December 1934 (aged 73) London, England
- Party: Liberal
- Spouse: Edith Augusta Lewin (m. 1889)
- Education: Christ Church, Oxford

Stanley Owen Buckmaster, 1st Viscount Buckmaster, GCVO, PC (9 January 1861 – 5 December 1934) was a British lawyer and Liberal Party politician. He was a Member of Parliament (MP) for most of the years from 1906 to 1915, when he was elevated to the peerage and served as Lord Chancellor under H. H. Asquith from 1915 to 1916.

== Background and education ==
Buckmaster was born on 9 January 1861 to John Charles Buckmaster, of Ashleigh, Hampton Wick, by his wife Emily Anne Goodliffe. His father began life as a young agricultural labourer, and rose to teach chemistry at the Imperial College of Science and Technology. He was educated at Aldenham School and Christ Church, Oxford, where he took second class honours in mathematics. He was called to the Bar in 1884 at the Inner Temple. Beginning with a general practice on the Midland circuit, he eventually came to acquire a large Chancery practice. He was appointed King's Counsel in April 1902. The same year he joined Lincoln's Inn.

== Political career ==
At the 1906 general election, Buckmaster was elected as MP for Cambridge, winning the seat from the Conservatives with a majority of less than 4%. At the January 1910 general election, he lost the seat to the Conservative Almeric Paget on a 5% swing. He contested Cambridge again at the December 1910 election, but made only a small dent in the Conservative majority.

Buckmaster returned to the Commons the following year, when he was elected at a by-election in October 1911 for the safe Liberal seat of Keighley in Yorkshire. He was knighted in 1913 on his appointment as Solicitor general, when he was comfortably re-elected in the ministerial by-election.

He was a Member of the Council of the Duchy of Lancaster and served under H. H. Asquith as Solicitor-General from 1913 to 1915. Buckmaster was also Counsel to the University of Oxford from 1911 to 1913, Director of The Press Bureau, 1914 to 1915, and a member of The Interallied Conference on Finance and Supplies.

== Lord Chancellor ==
In 1915, Asquith was forced to form a Coalition government. The Conservatives insisted on the removal of Lord Haldane as Lord Chancellor, and after Sir John Simon refused the post Buckmaster was appointed instead. He was sworn of the Privy Council and raised to the peerage as Baron Buckmaster, of Cheddington in the County of Buckingham.

Buckmaster was Lord Chancellor for only eighteen months, resigning alongside Asquith in December 1916. His tenure was largely overshadowed by the war. He only appointed two High Court judges—Peterson and McCardie—and no new King's Counsel, on the grounds that junior barristers engaged in war service would be disadvantaged. Sitting judicially, he gave the decision in Cook v Deeks, a notable company law case. As a member of the Cabinet, he also took part in decision concerning war strategy.

== Lord of Appeal ==
After stepping down from the woolsack, Buckmaster continued to sit judicially as a Lord of Appeal, except for a time when he left his judicial work to go into the City. In Bowman v. Secular Society he held that a company formed for the purpose of challenging Christianity was not illegal. In Donoghue v Stevenson he gave a dissenting opinion against the extension of the duty of care. He was highly regarded as a judge by his colleagues: Lord Birkenhead described him as "a consummate judge" and Lord Dunedin regarded him as the greatest colleague he had on the bench.

He later served as Chairman of the Governing Body of Imperial College of Science and Technology and as Chairman of the Political Honours Review Committee between 1924 and 1929. He was appointed GCVO in 1930 and was made Viscount Buckmaster, of Cheddington in the County of Buckingham, in 1933.

== Marriage and children ==
Buckmaster married Edith Augusta Lewin, daughter of Spencer Robert Lewin, on 29 December 1889. They had three children:

- Owen Stanley Buckmaster, 2nd Viscount Buckmaster (24 September 1890 – 25 September 1974)
- Hon Margaret Anna Buckmaster (8 March 1893 – 4 June 1929), author, social reformer and Labour Party activist, married Dighton Nicolas Pollock.
- Hon. Barbara Buckmaster (21 October 1903 – September 1966), married Lt Cdr John Miller, mother of Conservative politician Sir Hal Miller.

His niece, Hilda Buckmaster was also active in politics, three times standing as a parliamentary candidate for the Liberal Party.

== Death ==
Lord Buckmaster died in London in December 1934 at the age of 73 and was cremated at Golders Green Crematorium. He was succeeded in the viscountcy and barony by his only son, Owen.

Lady Buckmaster died in October 1935.

== Arms ==
Coat of arms of Stanley Buckmaster, 1st Viscount Buckmaster
Crest A demi-lion Azure holding in the dexter paw a fleur-de-lis and charged on the shoulder with a portcullis both Or. Escutcheon Or semee of fleurs-de-lis Azure a lion rampant of the last on a chief of the second a portcullis of the first. Supporters On either side a bulk Proper each gorged with a chain pendant therefrom a portcullis Or. Motto Equanimitas Magnanimitas (Latin for 'Equanimity, Magnanimity') Orders Knight Grand Cross of the Royal Victorian Order

Parliament of the United Kingdom
Preceded by Sir Robert Uniacke-Penrose-Fitzgerald, Bt	Member of Parliament for Cambridge; 1906 – January 1910	Succeeded by Almeric Paget
Preceded by Sir John Brigg	Member of Parliament for Keighley; 1911–1915	Succeeded by Sir Swire Smith
Legal offices
Preceded by Sir John Simon	Solicitor General; 1913–1915	Succeeded by Sir F. E. Smith
Political offices
Preceded by The Viscount Haldane	Lord High Chancellor of Great Britain; 1915–1916	Succeeded by The Viscount Finlay
Peerage of the United Kingdom
New creation	Viscount Buckmaster; 1933 – 1934	Succeeded by Owen Buckmaster
New creation	Baron Buckmaster; 1915 – 1934	Succeeded by Owen Buckmaster
