= William Bland (politician) =

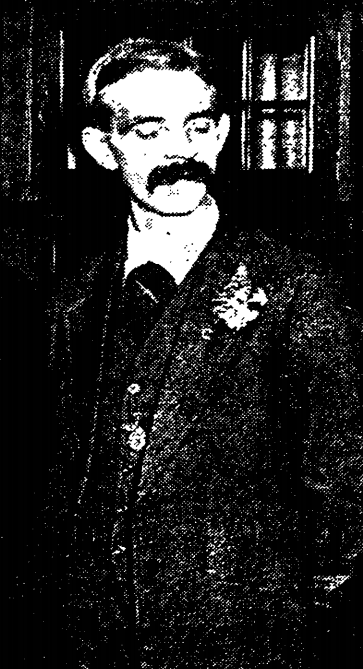
Bland in 1913

William Bland (died 1945) was a British politician and trade unionist.

Bland worked as a joiner in Keighley, in the West Riding of Yorkshire, and was active in the Amalgamated Society of Carpenters and Joiners. He was an early member of the Independent Labour Party (ILP) and, through it, became active in the Labour Party, serving as the secretary of the town's Labour Representation Committee.

Two weeks before the 1913 Keighley by-election was held, the ILP proposed that Bland should stand in it. While the Labour Party had not been planning to stand a candidate, it found that support for Bland among the local party was very high, and so agreed to endorse his candidature, despite concerns about poor organisation in the local party. The National Union of Women's Suffrage Societies also agreed to back Bland, as he was the only candidate committed to women's suffrage, although it decided against giving him financial backing. They were concerned that he would fail to match the 28.9% of the vote which William Crawford Anderson had received as the Labour candidate in the 1911 Keighley by-election, and that this would discredit their cause. Ultimately, Bland performed well, taking 29.8% of the vote, but third place.

Another by-election arose in Keighley, in 1918. As World War I was underway, the main political parties had a national pact not to stand against each other, but the ILP opposed the war and decided to stand Bland in the election. Aware that he would not receive the endorsement of the Labour Party, he did not seek it, but he received the full backing of the ILP, which financially sponsored his candidacy, and was also backed by the local trades council. His campaign focused on ending the war by negotiation. Standing against a single opponent, the Liberal William Somervell, Bland received 32.5% of the votes cast. He declared that this total was in line with his expectations.

Bland stood again in Keighley at the 1918 United Kingdom general election. Facing both Somervell and a new Conservative Party opponent, he took third place with 27.7% of the vote. He subsequently focused on local politics, and served as Mayor of Keighley in 1928/28, the first Labour Party politician to hold the post. He died in 1945.
