= South Stoke, Somerset =

Village in Somerset, England

Coordinates: 51.352°N 2.357°W

South Stoke
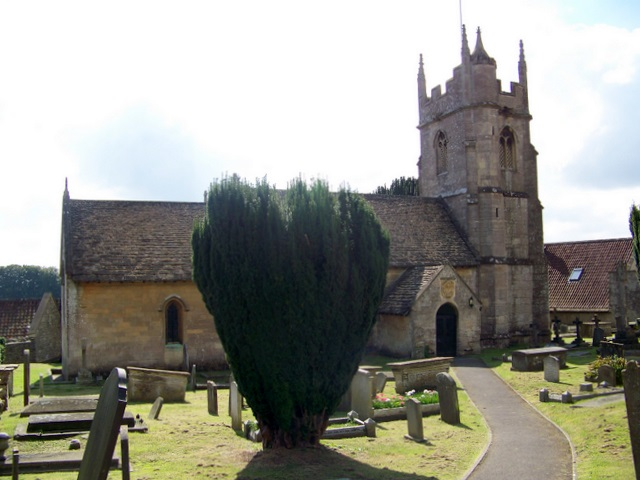
- St. James' church

- Location within Somerset
- Population: 460
- OS grid reference: ST752615
- Civil parish: Southstoke
- Unitary authority: Bath and North East Somerset
- Ceremonial county: Somerset
- Region: South West
- Country: England
- Sovereign state: United Kingdom
- Post town: BATH
- Postcode district: BA2
- Police: Avon and Somerset
- Fire: Avon
- Ambulance: South Western
- UK Parliament: Frome and East Somerset
- Website: www.southstokepc.org.uk

South Stoke or Southstoke is a small village and civil parish in north east Somerset, England. It is 2 miles (3 km) south of the city of Bath, on the River Avon and the route of the disused Somerset Coal Canal.

In 2004, the parish council requested that the name be formally changed to South Stoke, as "this is historically the more established spelling (rather than the single word spelling Southstoke) and better reflects the origin and meaning of the Parish name."

South Stoke is a designated Conservation Area as identified by the Planning (Listed Buildings and Conservation Areas) Act 1990. The buildings are mainly cream oolitic limestone and many of the 42 listed structures in the parish are in and around the village, which has retained much of its original character and historic appeal.

== History ==
Southstoke was part of the hundred of Bath Forum.

In the 19th century, a mine extracting Fuller's earth was dug close to the line of the Wansdyke. It closed before 1902.

== Governance ==
The parish council has responsibility for local issues, including setting an annual precept (local rate) to cover the council's operating costs and producing annual accounts for public scrutiny. The parish council evaluates local planning applications and works with the local police, district council officers, and neighbourhood watch groups on matters of crime, security, and traffic. The parish council's role also includes initiating projects for the maintenance and repair of parish facilities, such as the village hall or community centre, playing fields and playgrounds, as well as consulting with the district council on the maintenance, repair, and improvement of highways, drainage, footpaths, public transport, and street cleaning. Conservation matters (including trees and listed buildings) and environmental issues are also of interest to the council.

The parish falls within the unitary authority of Bath and North East Somerset which was created in 1996, as established by the Local Government Act 1992. It provides a single tier of local government with responsibility for almost all local government functions within their area including local planning and building control, local roads, council housing, environmental health, markets and fairs, refuse collection, recycling, cemeteries, crematoria, leisure services, parks, and tourism. They are also responsible for education, social services, libraries, main roads, public transport, trading standards, waste disposal and strategic planning, although fire, police and ambulance services are provided jointly with other authorities through the Avon Fire and Rescue Service, Avon and Somerset Constabulary and the Great Western Ambulance Service.

Bath and North East Somerset's area covers part of the ceremonial county of Somerset but it is administered independently of the non-metropolitan county. Its administrative headquarters are in Bath. Between 1 April 1974 and 1 April 1996, it was the Wansdyke district and the City of Bath of the county of Avon. Before 1974 that the parish was part of the Bathavon Rural District.

The parish is represented in the House of Commons of the Parliament of the United Kingdom as part of the Frome and East Somerset county constituency. It elects one Member of Parliament (MP) by the first past the post system of election.

== Amenities ==
The village provides views over the surrounding area and is the starting point for country walks. A popular route is to visit other villages and their pubs in the area, such as Combe Hay and Midford.

=== Packhorse Inn ===
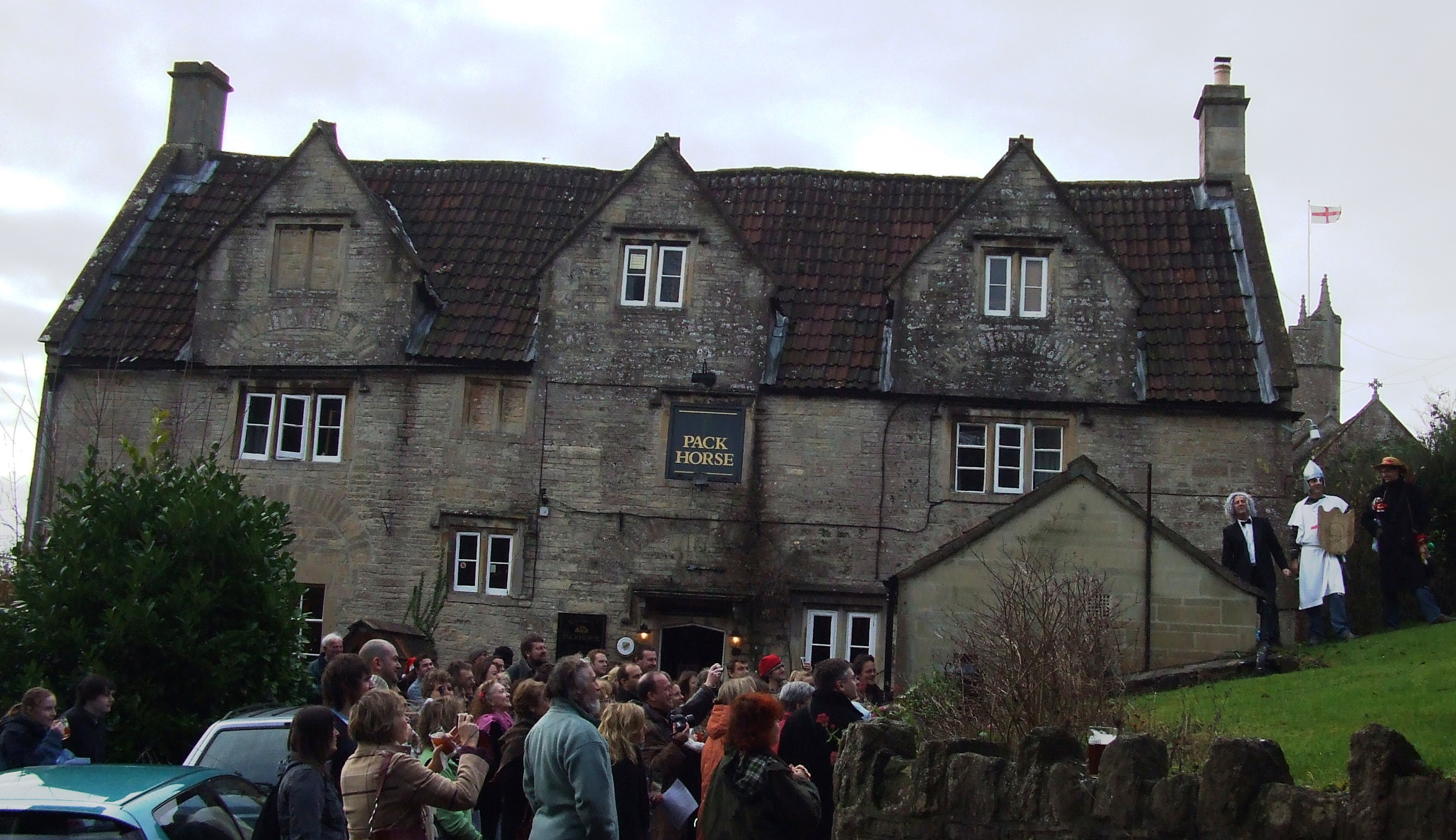
Packhorse Inn

The village for centuries had an ancient pub, the Packhorse Inn, which had a garden and served many traditional beers and ciders, as well as food. It dated from 1498, when it was rebuilt on the site of an earlier guesthouse or hostelry built by monks to provide shelter with food and drink for travellers and pilgrims. The present building dates from 1674, and has been designated by Historic England as a Grade II listed building. Despite this long history, the pub closed unexpectedly in 2012, and was bought by a private individual wishing to use it as a dwelling-house.

However, there was vigorous opposition to this by the local community. Planning permission for the change of use was refused; the building was registered as a resource of community interest under the Localism Act, and ultimately the new owner agreed to sell it to the community. A private company with significant elements of common ownership accountability was formed, and an appeal launched. Over £1 million was raised for the purchase, along with a refurbishment made costly by the building's heritage status. But although a new car park was built and the women's lavatories brought indoors, the building's character was faithfully preserved – indeed, a 17th-century fireplace which had been hidden for years was revealed and restored. The Packhorse reopened to the public on 18 March 2018.

== Church of St James ==
The church is dedicated to St James. It dates from the 12th century, was altered in the 15th, and further restored with the chancel and south aisle being rebuilt between 1845 and 1850. It is Grade II* listed.
