= John Brigg =

British politician

John Brigg c1895

John Brigg c1909

Sir John Brigg DL (21 September 1834 – 30 September 1911), was a British Liberal Party politician.

== Background ==
He was the second son of John Brigg from Keighley and Margaret Ann Marriner from Greengate. He married in 1860, Mary Anderton from Bingley. They had four sons and one daughter.

== Political career ==
He was Liberal MP for the Keighley Division of the West Riding of Yorkshire, from 1895 to his death in 1911. He was a justice of the peace, and was appointed a deputy lieutenant of the West Riding of Yorkshire and of the city and county of the city of York on 19 June 1902. He was an Alderman on Yorkshire County Council. He was Knighted in 1909.

== Business career ==
He was actively engaged in Worsted business until 1890, being Chairman of John Brigg & Company Ltd., worsted-spinners and manufacturers of Calversyke Mill, Keighley. He was a Director of Leeds and Liverpool Canal Company. He was a Director of William Ramsden & Company Ltd. He was a director and vice-chairman of Bradford Old Bank. He was on the advisory board of United Counties Bank.

== Educational interest ==
He was a governor of Skipton and Giggleswick Grammar Schools. He helped to found Keighley Trade School and reorganise Girls' Grammar School. He was a governor of Skipton and Keighley Girls Grammar Schools. He was a life governor and council member of Yorkshire College.

== Death ==
Brigg died on 30 September 1911, aged 77.

== Sources ==
- Who Was Who; http://www.ukwhoswho.com
- British parliamentary election results 1885–1918, Craig, F. W. S.

Parliament of the United Kingdom
Preceded by Sir Isaac Holden	Member of Parliament for Keighley; 1895–1911	Succeeded by Stanley Buckmaster
