= 1915 Keighley by-election =

UK parliamentary by-election

The 1915 Keighley by-election was a parliamentary by-election held for the UK House of Commons constituency of Keighley in the West Riding of Yorkshire on 29 June 1915.

== Vacancy ==
The by-election was caused by the appointment of the sitting Liberal MP, Stanley Buckmaster as Lord Chancellor and his consequent elevation to the peerage.

== Candidates ==
Keighley Liberals chose Sir Swire Smith as their candidate. Smith was well known locally in business and public life. He had become a national figure through his promotion of technical education.

== Result ==
There being no other candidates putting themselves forward Smith was returned unopposed.

Keighley by-election, 1915
Party	Candidate	Votes	%	±%
Liberal	Swire Smith	Unopposed	N/A	N/A
Liberal hold				

== See also ==
- List of United Kingdom by-elections
- United Kingdom by-election records
