= Robert Clough =

British politician

Sir Robert Clough (10 February 1873 – 27 September 1965) was Coalition Conservative MP for Keighley. He won it from the Liberals in 1918, but stood down in 1922. He later stood in the 1930 Shipley by-election.

== Sources ==
- Whitaker's Almanack, 1919 to 1922 editions
- F W S Craig, British Parliamentary Election Results, 1918–1949; Political Reference Publications, Glasgow, 1949 p. 517
