= List of UK Parliament constituencies in Gwent =

The preserved county of Gwent is divided into seven-and-a-half parliamentary constituencies — approximately one half of Merthyr Tydfil and Rhymney falls within Mid Glamorgan. (Note: county constituencies (CCs) for the purposes of type of returning officer and level of expenses; the trivial distinction is sometimes made in the most detailed analyses of UK politics between borough and county constituencies).

== Constituencies ==
Name
1. Blaenau Gwent CC
2. Caerphilly CC
3. Islwyn CC
4. Merthyr Tydfil and Rhymney CC (part)
5. Monmouth CC
6. Newport East CC
7. Newport West CC
8. Torfaen CC
Current boundaries

Parliamentary constituencies in Gwent

Conservative † Labour ‡ Brexit Party ৳

| Constituency | Electorate | Majority | Member of Parliament | Nearest opposition | Map reference above |
|---|---|---|---|---|---|
| Blaenau Gwent | 50,736 | 8,647 | Nick Smith ‡ | Richard Taylor ৳ | 1 |
| Caerphilly | 63,166 | 6,833 | Wayne David ‡ | Jane Pratt † | 2 |
| Islwyn | 55,423 | 5,464 | Christopher Evans ‡ | Gavin Chambers † | 3 |
| Merthyr Tydfil and Rhymney | This data is shown at list of Parliamentary constituencies in Mid Glamorgan | | | | |
| Monmouth | 67,094 | 9,982 | David Davies † | Yvonne Murphy ‡ | 5 |
| Newport East | 58,554 | 1,992 | Jessica Morden ‡ | Mark Brown † | 6 |
| Newport West | 66,657 | 902 | Ruth Jones ‡ | Matthew Evans † | 7 |
| Torfaen | 61,743 | 3,742 | Nick Thomas-Symonds ‡ | Graham Smith † | 8 |

The current boundaries have been effective since the 2007 National Assembly for Wales election and the 2010 United Kingdom general election. Very, in relative terms, minor boundary changes occurred from the previous scheme and no name changes.

== Proposed boundary changes ==
The Boundary Commission for Wales submitted their final proposals in respect of the Sixth Periodic Review of Westminster Constituencies (the 2018 review) in September 2018. Although the proposals were immediately laid before Parliament they were not brought forward by the Government for approval. Accordingly, they did not come into effect for the 2019 election which took place on 12 December 2019, and which was contested using the constituency boundaries in place since 2010.

Under the terms of the Parliamentary Voting System and Constituencies Act 2011, the Sixth Review was based on reducing the total number of MPs from 650 to 600 and a strict electoral parity requirement that the electorate of all constituencies should be within a range of 5% either side of the electoral quota.

On 24 March 2020, the Minister of State for the Cabinet Office, Chloe Smith, issued a written statement to Parliament setting out the Government's thinking with regard to parliamentary boundaries. They propose to bring forward primary legislation to remove the statutory obligation to implement the 2018 Boundary Review recommendations, as well as set the framework for future boundary reviews in time for the next review which is due to begin in early 2021 and report no later than October 2023. It is proposed that the number of constituencies now remains at the current level of 650, rather than being reduced to 600, while retaining the requirement that the electorate should be no more than +/- 5% from the electoral quota.

== Historical representation by party ==
A cell marked → (with a different colour background to the preceding cell) indicates that the previous MP continued to sit under a new party name.

=== 1885 to 1918 ===
Conservative Labour Liberal Liberal-Labour

| Constituency | 1885 | 1886 | 1892 | 1895 | 1900 | 01 | 04 | 1906 | Jan 1910 | Dec 1910 | 17 |
|---|---|---|---|---|---|---|---|---|---|---|---|
| Monmouth Boroughs | Carbutt | Elliot | Spicer | | Harris | Lawrence | | Haslam | | | |
| Monmouthshire North | Price | | | McKenna | | | | | | | |
| Monmouthshire South | Morgan | | | | | | | Herbert | | | Thomas |
| Monmouthshire West | Warmington | | | Harcourt | | | Richards | | → | | |

=== 1918 to 1950 ===
Coalition Liberal (1918-22) / National Liberal (1922-23) Conservative Independent Labour Labour

| Constituency | 1918 | 20 | 22 | 1922 | 1923 | 1924 | 1929 | 1931 | 34 | 1935 | 39 | 40 | 45 | 1945 | 45 | 46 | 1950 |
|---|---|---|---|---|---|---|---|---|---|---|---|---|---|---|---|---|---|
| Abertillery | Brace | Barker | | | | | Daggar | | | | | | | | | | |
| Bedwellty | Edwards | | | | | | | | | | | | | | | | Finch |
| Ebbw Vale | Richards | Davies | | | | | Bevan | | | | → | → | | | | | |
| Monmouth | Forestier-Walker | | | | | | | | Herbert | | Pym | | | | Thorneycroft | | |
| Newport | Haslam | | Clarry | | | | Walker | Clarry | | | | | Bell | Freeman | | | |
| Pontypool | Griffiths | | | | | | | | | Jenkins | | | | | | West | |

=== 1950 to 1983 ===
Conservative Labour Social Democratic

| Constituency | 1950 | 50 | 1951 | 1955 | 56 | 58 | 1959 | 60 | 1964 | 65 | 1966 | 1970 | Feb 74 | Oct 74 | 1979 | 81 |
|---|---|---|---|---|---|---|---|---|---|---|---|---|---|---|---|---|
| Abertillery | Daggar | L. Williams | | | | | | | | A. Williams | | Thomas | | | | → |
| Bedwellty | Finch | | | | | | | | | | | Kinnock | | | | |
| Ebbw Vale | Bevan | | | | | | | Foot | | | | | | | | |
| Monmouth | Thorneycroft | | | | | | | | | | Anderson | Thomas | | | | |
| Newport | Freeman | | | | Soskice | | | | | | Hughes | | | | | |
| Pontypool | West | | | | | Abse | | | | | | | | | | |

=== 1983 to present ===
Blaenau Gwent People's Voice Conservative Independent Labour

| Constituency | 1983 | 1987 | 91 | 1992 | 95 | 1997 | 2001 | 2005 | 06 | 2010 | 2015 | 2017 | 19 | 2019 | 2024 |
|---|---|---|---|---|---|---|---|---|---|---|---|---|---|---|---|
| Blaenau Gwent; B. G. & Rhymney ('24) | Foot | | | L. Smith | | | | Law | D. C. Davies | N. Smith | | | | | |
| Caerphilly | R. Davies | | | | | | David | | | | | | | | Evans |
| Islwyn | Kinnock | | | | Touhig | | | | | C. Evans | | | | | N/A |
| Monmouth; Monmouthshire (2024) | Thomas | | Edwards | R. Evans | | Edwards | | D. T. Davies | | | | | | | Fookes |
| Newport East | Hughes | | | | | Howarth | | Morden | | | | | | | |
| Newport W Newport W & Islwyn ('24) | Robinson | Flynn | | | | | | | | | | | Jones | | |
| Torfaen | Abse | Murphy | | | | | | | | | Thomas-Symonds | | | | |

== See also ==
- List of parliamentary constituencies in Wales
- List of parliamentary constituencies in Mid Glamorgan for the other part of Merthyr Tydfil and Rhymney.
