= Newport by-election =

Newport by-election may refer to one of three parliamentary by-elections held in the British House of Commons constituency of Newport in Monmouthshire, South Wales:

- 1922 Newport by-election
- 1945 Newport by-election
- 1956 Newport by-election

There is also an upcoming by-election for the modified constituency of Newport West (UK Parliament constituency) in 2019.

== See also ==
- Newport (Monmouthshire) (UK Parliament constituency)
- List of United Kingdom by-elections
