= Carlton Club meeting =

1922 British political event

- Date: 19 October 1922
- Location: The Carlton Club, London
- Participants: Conservative Members of Parliament
- Outcome: Collapse of coalition government; Resignation of Austen Chamberlain as party leader

The Carlton Club meeting, on 19 October 1922, was a formal meeting of Members of Parliament who belonged to the Conservative Party, called to discuss whether the party should remain in government in coalition with a section of the Liberal Party under the leadership of Liberal prime minister David Lloyd George. The party leadership favoured continuing, but the party rebels led by Bonar Law and Stanley Baldwin argued that participation was damaging the party. The meeting voted decisively against the Coalition, which resulted in its collapse, the resignation of Austen Chamberlain as party leader, and the invitation of Law to form a Government. The Conservatives subsequently won the general election with an overall majority.

== Background ==
The Conservatives and Liberals, traditional rivals, had first come together in a coalition government during the First World War in 1915 under H. H. Asquith. A crisis of confidence in December 1916 led to Asquith's replacement by David Lloyd George, and the Liberal Party split between supporters of the two with Asquith's faction going into increasingly open opposition. The coalition continued after the end of the war with the 1918 election delivering a large majority for 'Coalition Coupon' candidates, although most coalition supporters were Conservatives. Lloyd George was never personally popular with Conservatives, and the government's introduction of Liberal policies led several Conservative MPs to go into opposition over the next four years. In October 1922, the overall state of the parties in Parliament was:

Party strengths in Parliament, October 1922
Party	Faction	Government	Opposition
Conservatives	Coalition	313	
Conservatives	Non-coalition		65
Liberals	Coalition	120	
Liberals	Non-coalition		35
Labour			76
'Coalition Labour' or NDP		11	
Others			87 (Note: Mostly Sinn Féiners who had never taken up their seats (those who were not in prison following the supposed German Plot had instead assembled in Dublin to form Dáil Éireann and declared unilateral Irish independence). Those seats were now due for abolition as Britain had recognised the independence of the Irish Free State.)

=== Chanak Crisis ===
Conservative discontent with the Coalition was maximised by the sudden diplomatic crisis with Turkey and Lloyd George's willingness to see war over the Turkish threat to the British and French troops stationed at Çanakkale. The Foreign Secretary in the coalition government, Lord Curzon, was a Conservative but was absent when the Cabinet agreed a strong response. Curzon knew that the response would cause a diplomatic breach with France, where the prime minister was friendly towards the Turks; in fact, the French had already ordered their troops' withdrawal. At the last minute, Curzon arranged with the French to negotiate an armistice rather than withdraw. The incident also caused some of the Dominion governments to protest. Conservatives blamed Lloyd George personally for a needless confrontation.

== Calling of the meeting ==
Amid increasing public attacks on the Coalition and on Lloyd George personally, the Cabinet on 10 October decided to call a general election as a Coalition. Austen Chamberlain and David Lloyd George both arranged to speak at public meetings in defence of the Coalition. Opinion from the Conservative Party membership was reported to say that holding a general election as a Coalition would split the party, but there was speculation that if Lloyd George were replaced by a Conservative as prime minister, the situation might be different. Chamberlain, in his speech in Birmingham on 13 October, asserted that the Coalition was united and that Lloyd George had behaved with perfect loyalty to the Conservatives in it. He also stated that he did not intend to call a meeting for Conservatives to decide their attitude to the coalition.

On 15 October Chamberlain called a meeting of all Conservative Members of the House of Commons, to ask for a vote of confidence in his leadership and in the continuation of the coalition. Chamberlain intended that a common electoral programme be agreed for the general election and the precise details be settled after the expected victory despite the fact that Lloyd George had specifically opposed that in his speech.

== Events prior to the meeting ==
Before the meeting there was particular speculation about the position of Bonar Law. He had been Leader of the Conservative Party for ten years, resigning both the leadership and his Government post in 1921 due to ill health, and he retained a large following within the party. On 7 October, a letter from Law was published by The Times, outlining his views on future British policy in the Near East, which differed from that of the Coalition. While his attendance at the meeting was not certain as his health was still poor, the driving factor for Law was thought to be Conservative Party unity. Law made up his mind the day before to go to the meeting, and to oppose the Coalition there.

Preparing for the meeting, several groups of Conservative MPs met to discuss the situation. Leo Amery, who disliked the idea of a Coalition which existed only for the "negative policy of anti-Socialism", called a meeting of 17 Conservative ministers on 16 October, at which he found many wanted Lloyd George deposed. Chamberlain heard of the meeting and accused Amery of plotting against him; Amery said that he was trying to arrange a compromise. On 18 October, Amery told chief whip Leslie Wilson that the coalition's future should be decided by a party meeting after the election; Wilson obtained Chamberlain's agreement. Also on that day, about 80 Conservative MPs met under Sir Samuel Hoare; they supported independence in the election with possible post-election co-operation with Coalition Liberals. This group organised a delegation to Law to persuade him to oppose the coalition and drafted a motion for the Carlton Club meeting.

== Newport ==
Simultaneously with the crisis, there was a by-election campaign underway in the borough of Newport caused by the death of the sitting Coalition Liberal MP. The general expectation among the press was that the Labour Party would win. The poll was held on 18 October and counted immediately after with the result being declared at 2 AM. Conservative candidate Reginald Clarry won the seat, with the Liberal candidate finishing a poor third. Because of the timing, only two London newspapers were able to cover the result in much detail, but The Times gave it particular prominence including a leading article, which described it as a "complete condemnation of the Coalition Government" and vindicating the anti-Coalition Conservatives.

== The meeting itself ==
There was a large turnout of Members of Parliament to the meeting, which began at 11 AM on 19 October in the Carlton Club (then based at 94 Pall Mall rather than the current premises at 69 St James's Street). Many of those arriving at the meeting were still shocked by recently learning of the Newport result. On his way into the meeting J.C.C. Davidson correctly predicted to the lobby correspondent of The Yorkshire Post that the result would be “a slice off the top” (i.e. that the existing front bench would have to give up their positions).

Although the meeting was private, a report was issued to the press by Conservative Central Office immediately after.

According to this report, Chamberlain as chair began by complaining that the "storm of attack and criticism" over the Chanak Crisis had weakened Britain's influence and undermined its authority. Chamberlain referred to the imminent general election and the need to unify the party, saying that the Coalition could not continue as it was and a critical decision was needed. Explaining that the real fight was not between Conservative and Liberal but between those who stand for individual freedom and those who are for the socialisation of the state, he asserted that it was not a moment to break with old allies and that it would be impossible to get a majority against the Labour Party without cooperation with the Liberals. He then rejected the idea of "half-hearted cooperation" in which the Conservatives would split with the Liberals after the election if they were able to form a government on their own. Chamberlain concluded that it would be arbitrary and mad to split from the Liberals "in face of the danger which confronts us".

It was noted that Chamberlain was rather coldly received, in contrast to Law and Baldwin. Davidson wrote that Chamberlain's speech was “quite a good speech from his point of view, but it was really idolatry [of Lloyd George]” and “a lecture”.

Chamberlain was followed by Stanley Baldwin, who put forward the views of the anti-coalition ministers. He openly threatened to stand as an Independent Conservative in the election if the coalition continued and criticised the decision to call an election without consulting the party. Baldwin referred to the description of Lloyd George as "a dynamic force" and noted that the result of that force was the destruction of his own Liberal Party; he feared that the same destruction would be visited on the Conservative Party in time. As evidence he referred to the fact that both he and Chamberlain were prepared to "go into the wilderness" should the meeting go against them, a division he attributed to Lloyd George personally. This was famously summed up in his phrase: "a dynamic force can be a terrible thing".

Veteran MP Captain Ernest Pretyman spoke next, opposing the Coalition and asserting that the issues of the day could "best be met by Conservative principles rather than by a Coalition of which many members are very doubtful". Believing that the Conservative Party should come out on its own, he moved a resolution:

That this meeting of Conservative members of the House of Commons declares its opinion that the Conservative Party, whilst willing to cooperate with Coalition Liberals, fights the election as an independent party, with its own leader and its own programme.

The motion was seconded by George Lane-Fox, who said that it was impossible for a coalition to have principles. He believed it would be wrong to pretend to the electors that the Conservative Party was independent when it was intended that the Coalition would continue as before.

Davidson wrote that Pretyman and Lane-Fox were chosen to propose the motion as they were decent and well-respected, albeit not particularly talented, backbench MPs.

Frank Mildmay regarded some of the criticism of Lloyd George as unfair and unpatriotic but referred to a previous speech by Chamberlain that declared that the Government should not go into an election as a coalition. He referred to his history as a Liberal Unionist and paid tribute to the measures introduced by Conservatives and Liberal Unionists in Coalition governments but appealed for "real true fidelity to the principles" of the Unionist Party. Sir Henry Craik also spoke in support of fighting the election independently, believing the party had not fully exercised its influence in Government.

=== Bonar Law ===
Law then spoke, admitting it was only at the last minute he decided to come to the meeting. He described the idea of the Coalition fighting and winning an election and the Conservatives then asking Lloyd George to resign in favour of Chamberlain as dishonourable since winning the election would be a mandate for Lloyd George. Law had no fear of a Labour Government being elected and thought continuing the Coalition would help Labour by making it the only credible opposition. He then described the split in the Conservative Party in which many members had refused to stand as Coalition supporters and said that carrying out Chamberlain's intentions would repeat what happened when Robert Peel repealed the Corn Laws: a split in which "the body that is cast off will slowly become the Conservative Party, but it will take a generation before it gets back to the influence which the party ought to have". He concluded by referring to the replacement of Asquith by Lloyd George because of the loss of confidence in Asquith's ability to win the war and stated that he had the same feeling now about Lloyd George.

One section of Law's speech was suppressed from the official report. In it Law accepted that he was "an opportunist" and that the smashing of the Liberal Party by Lloyd George "did not disturb me a bit".

Law was followed by the Earl of Balfour, the former prime minister, who made a speech in support of the Coalition. He dismissed the suggestion that Lloyd George was insinuating Liberal principles onto the Conservative ministers and believed that breaking up the Coalition would destroy the machinery that would best tackle future political issues and artificially revive the two-party system. He concluded by strongly urging the meeting to support its leader, at which there were cries of "Bonar Law!". Colonel Leslie Wilson, the Chief Whip of the Conservative Party and a junior Minister in the Coalition, said that it would be impossible for any member of the Government to take the course proposed by Chamberlain; if asked at the election whether he would serve under Lloyd George if the Conservatives won a majority, his answer would have to be 'No'.

After James Fitzalan Hope made an attempt to adjourn the meeting until the following day, Sir A. Shirley Benn spoke of his recollection that the Coalition was to last one Parliament only. Lord Hugh Cecil urged a straight vote on whether there should be a Conservative policy supporting a Conservative Prime Minister, or a Coalition policy supporting Lloyd George. Chamberlain intervened from the chair to accept that proposition and accepted that Pretyman's motion embodied it. He persuaded James Fitzalan Hope to withdraw his motion for an adjournment and then began to put Pretyman's motion to the vote. Wilfrid Ashley quickly intervened to point out that those supporting the motion were in favour of a Conservative Prime Minister and a Conservative government.

== The vote ==
At least 286 MPs were present. At least 11 MPs were absent abroad on the day, none of whom were supporters of the Coalition.

The vote was taken by cards marked with the name of the MP. A number of slightly different figures have been published for the result.

Ayes (anti-Coalition)	disputed, 187–184
Noes (pro-Coalition)	disputed, 88–86

=== Official Record ===
The most commonly-quoted result is 187 against the coalition and 87 in favour. This was the number published in Volume 56 of Gleanings & Memoranda, the official Conservative Central Office record at that time, and was repeated in classic works such as Beaverbrook's Decline and Fall of Lloyd George, A.J.P. Taylor's English History 1914-1945 and The Unknown Prime Minister, Robert Blake's 1955 biography of Bonar Law. In his later history of the Conservative Party (footnote in the 1985 edition), Blake accepted that this figure was erroneous and accepted Rhodes James's figure of 185–88.

=== Voting Cards ===
The actual voting cards are preserved among the papers of J. C. C. Davidson, and a list of how each MP voted was published by Robert Rhodes James in his 1969 edition of Davidson's memoirs and papers. He states that the official result was 186–87, but that it was actually 185 against the coalition and 88 in favour. Michael Kinnear later noted that despite giving a figure of 185 voting in favour, Rhodes James only actually lists 184 doing so.

R. J. Q. Adams also examined the voting cards for his 1999 biography of Law, and writes that the result is incorrectly listed as 186–87 on the wrapping paper in which they are held, but that the true figure is 187 against the coalition and 88 in favour.

Adams and Rhodes James concur that Sir Robert Clough, MP for Keighley 1918–22, was the only abstention.

=== Chamberlain's List ===
Michael Kinnear (1973) wrote that according to a list kept at the time by Austen Chamberlain, 273 MPs voted, 187–86 with "at least a dozen abstentions”. Some ballot cards “may have been mixed up or marked inaccurately". Although Kinnear listed the contemporary views of all MPs, where known, in a long appendix, and named nine for whom Chamberlain and Davidson gave a different result, he stated that it was not possible to reconcile all discrepancies.

The resolution was a moderate one, calling for the Conservatives to fight the next election as a separate party, but not ruling out the negotiation of a new coalition, and some MPs - P. J. Ford told Austen Chamberlain at the time that it may have been as many as 50, but as he only named two Kinnear believes this to be an exaggeration - voted for it in the belief that they were supporting Chamberlain. Lieutenant-Colonel Sir Arthur Churchman voted for the motion but wrote on his card that he reserved the right to support a future coalition government or Liberal Prime Minister.

=== Analysis ===
Kinnear noted that according to Austen Chamberlain's list MPs voted according to a clear pattern, with those in traditionally Liberal areas supporting the Coalition, with its strongest supporters in Scotland, East Lancashire, the Southwest of England, and the East of England. Those in safe Conservative seats tended to oppose it.

Rhodes James added two breakdowns, the latter based on his totals listed above:

Frontbenchers' Vote	Cabinet Ministers	Junior Ministers and Whips	Totals
Ayes (anti-Coalition)	2	12	14
Noes (pro-Coalition)	3	7	10
Did Not Vote	0	4	4
Totals	5	23	28

When Elected	Elected Before 1918	Elected at 1918 General Election	Elected since 1918 General Election	Totals
Ayes (anti-Coalition)	84	75	26	185
Noes (pro-Coalition)	42	42	4	88
Totals	126	117	30	273

== Aftermath ==
Immediately after the meeting, the dissenting Conservative ministers, including Baldwin and Sir Arthur Griffith-Boscawen, gave in their resignations to Lloyd George, being followed by former Coalition supporters including Chamberlain and Balfour. Lloyd George drove to Buckingham Palace in the middle of the afternoon to offer the Government's resignation. King George V summoned Law and invited him to form a new Government, but Law demurred on the grounds that he was not leader of his party and could not accept until he was. His accession to the leadership was, however, regarded as a formality, and his first call after leaving the Palace was to invite Curzon to remain as Foreign Secretary when the Government was formed.

A meeting of the Unionist Party was summoned for Monday 23 October at the Hotel Cecil and unanimously confirmed Law as the new leader; he "kissed hands" and formally succeeded Lloyd George as prime minister in the afternoon, and immediately obtaining a dissolution of Parliament and calling a general election for 15 November. The Conservatives secured an overall majority at the election. Bonar Law, resigned, dying of cancer, in May 1923, and was succeeded by Stanley Baldwin, who had emerged as a major figure at the Carlton Club meeting and would be Conservative leader for most of the interwar period.

The Conservative Members who were first elected to Parliament in the 1922 election formed the Conservative Private Members' Committee to discuss and influence political events; the membership expanded in subsequent years as more new Conservative MPs were elected, and in 1926 all backbench members were invited to become members. The committee became popularly known as the 1922 Committee. However the name does not, as is sometimes wrongly supposed, stem from the Carlton Club meeting and the committee was in fact formed following the election, in April 1923.

== Books ==
- Adams, R. J. Q. (1999). Bonar Law. John Murray. ISBN 0-7195-5422-5.
- Blake, Robert (1985). The Conservative Party From Peel To Thatcher. HarperCollins. ISBN 0-0068-6003-6.
- Kinnear, Michael (1973). The Fall of Lloyd George: The Political Crisis of 1922. Macmillan. ISBN 1-349-00522-3.
- Rhodes James, Robert (1969). Memoirs of a Conservative. J.C.C Davidson's Memoirs and Papers 1910-37. Weidenfeld & Nicolson. ISBN 0-2971-7857-1.
