= 1917 South Monmouthshire by-election =

UK parliamentary by-election

The 1917 South Monmouthshire by-election was a by-election held on Thursday 12 July 1917 for the British House of Commons constituency of the Southern Division of Monmouthshire in South Wales.

== Vacancy ==
Herbert

The by-election was caused by the elevation to the peerage of the sitting Liberal MP Ivor Herbert. Herbert had been MP for South Monmouthshire since 1906 before which he had had a distinguished career in the British Army as an officer in the Grenadier Guards. He was Assistant Adjutant General in South Africa from 1889 to 1901.

== Candidates ==
The Liberals chose Sir Garrod Thomas, then aged 63 years, a noted surgeon and newspaper proprietor as the Coalition candidate. The Conservative and Labour parties, being partners in the coalition, agreed to abide by the wartime electoral truce and not run candidates. Despite the rumour of the possible intervention of Lieutenant E A Charles, a former Liberal Party agent in the seat, neither was there any challenge from the Asquithian Liberals for whom there was little sympathy in Wales, at least during the earlier stages of Lloyd George's premiership.

Garrod Thomas was not however to get a free run. Councillor Pardoe Thomas, a member of Newport Town Council, an ex-President of the Newport Chamber of Commerce, a shipowner and shipbroker put himself forward as an Independent Democrat.

== The campaign ==
In the atmosphere of wartime Britain, the by-election was swiftly called and progressed. The nominations were in by 6 July and the date of the election set for just a week later. Cllr Thomas' position was that Parliament should be composed of businessmen but also campaigned as supporter of temperance and a voice in Parliament not bound by the party whip.

Sir Garrod Thomas appealed to the electorate's sense of patriotism and the need for solidarity during this period of great national struggle. He made the successful prosecution of the war the principal plank of his campaigning. Garrod Thomas was supported by a letter from the prime minister underlining the wartime nature of the contest and held a number of public meetings. Cllr Thomas, perhaps intimidated by what was clearly a pro-war and patriotic atmosphere, failed to match his opponent in terms of public appearances.

== Result ==
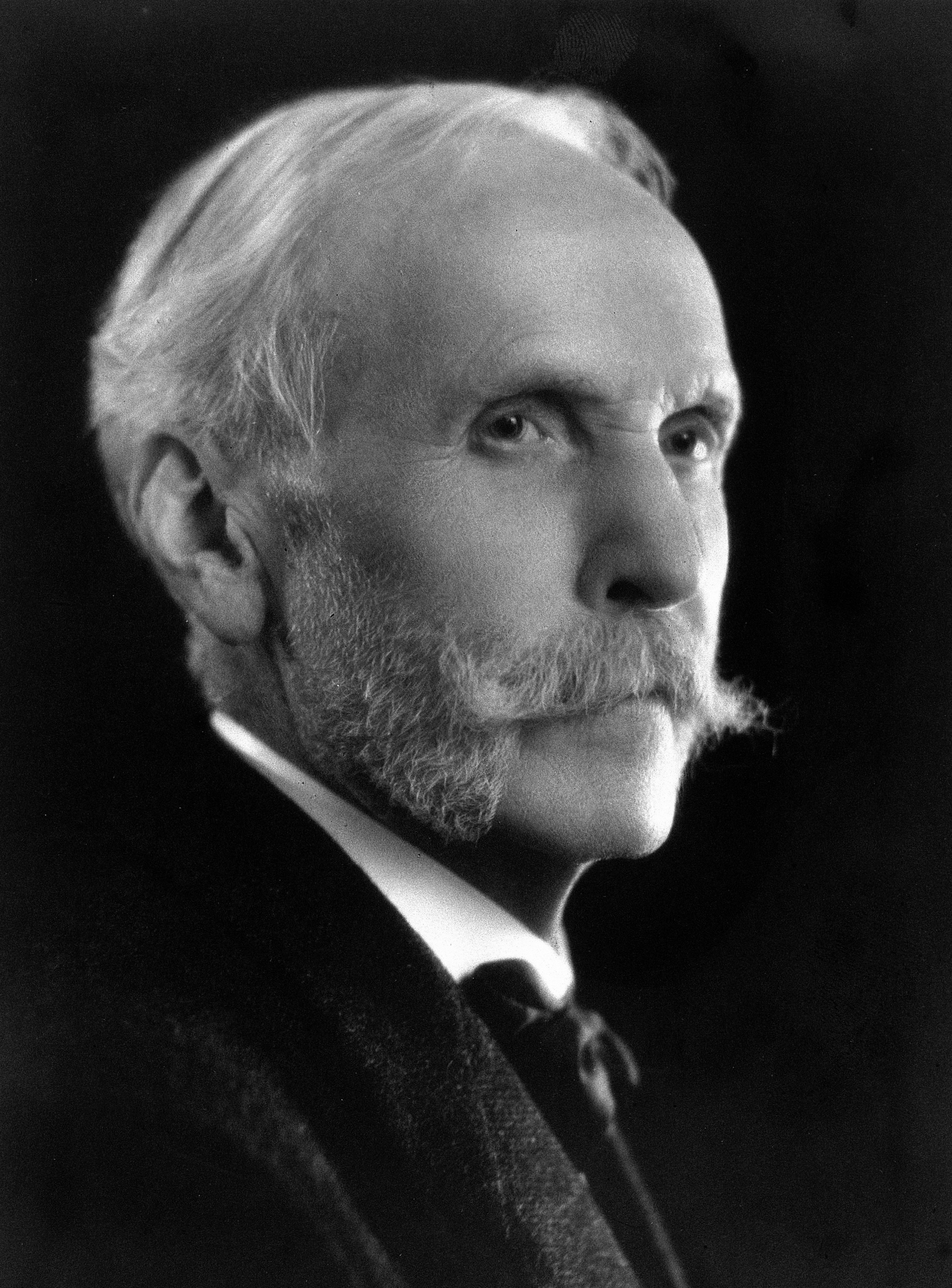
Garrod Thomas

1917 South Monmouthshire by-election
Party	Candidate	Votes	%	±%
Liberal	Abraham Garrod Thomas	6,769	90.3	+33.9
Independent	Bertie Pardoe Thomas	727	9.7	N/A
Majority		6,042	80.6	+67.8
Turnout		7,496	32.6	−47.1
Registered electors		22,991		
Liberal hold		Swing		

The electorate of South Monmouthshire seems to have been almost totally in tune with the coalition government's national appeal as they returned Garrod Thomas to Parliament with the largest ever majority achieved in the history of their constituency. Garrod Thomas achieved over 80% of the votes cast, comfortably holding the seat for the Coalition. He did not seem to take to Parliamentary life however as, apart from his maiden speech in the House of Commons on medical necessities during wartime, he does not seem to have made any other contributions of any kind. He failed to seek re-election in 1918 and did not stand for Parliament again, although he stayed active in Liberal politics and public life.

== See also ==
- Monmouthshire
- Politics of Wales
- List of United Kingdom by-elections (1900–1918)
