= Buckinghamshire (disambiguation) =

Buckinghamshire is a ceremonial county in southeast England.

Buckinghamshire may also refer to:

- Buckinghamshire, a former County of Lower Canada divided in 93 townships in 1792
- Buckinghamshire (UK Parliament constituency), a former United Kingdom Parliamentary constituency, 1707–1885
- South Buckinghamshire (UK Parliament constituency), a former County constituency and a division of the Administrative County of Buckinghamshire, 1950–1974

== See also ==
- Buckinghamshire Council, the unitary authority responsible for the centre and south of the English county.
- City of Milton Keynes, the unitary authority responsible for the north of that county.
