= 1922 Newport by-election =

UK parliamentary by-election

- 18 October 1922

Newport constituency

Candidate	Reginald Clarry	William Bowen	Lynden Moore
Party	Unionist	Labour	Liberal
Popular vote	13,515	11,425	8,841
Percentage	40.0	33.8	26.2
MP before election
Lewis Haslam
Liberal
Elected MP
Reginald Clarry
Unionist

The 1922 Newport by-election was by-election held in the parliamentary constituency of Newport in Wales on 18 October 1922. The by-election attracted especial attention, both at the time and since, as it was seen as a crucial electoral test of the viability of the Lloyd George Coalition Government, formed of followers of David Lloyd George with the Conservative Party, the latter of which contained an increasing number of members who wished to leave the coalition and regain the party's independence.

== Background of the constituency ==
The county borough of Newport was a large industrial town that had greatly expanded in the late nineteenth century and had consequently been granted a constituency in its own right in the 1918 redistribution. Prior to this it had been part of the Monmouth Boroughs constituency.

=== 1918 general election ===
In the 1918 general election the seat inherited both Monmouth's Liberal tradition and its MP, with Lewis Haslam winning as a "Coalition Liberal" supporting the Coalition Government and endorsed by both the Liberal and Conservative parties.

Lewis Haslam

1918 general election: Newport
Party		Candidate	Votes	%	±%
C	Liberal	Lewis Haslam	14,080	56.4	N/A
	Labour	William Bowen	10,234	41.0	N/A
	Independent Democrat	Bertie Pardoe Thomas	647	2.6	N/A
Majority			3,846	15.4	N/A
Turnout			24,961	62.2	N/A
Registered electors			40,146		
	Liberal win (new seat)				
C indicates candidate endorsed by the coalition government.

Locally Conservatives in Wales despised the coalition and regarded the electoral pact as valid for one election only. They were further enraged when Haslam did not give support for Conservative measures despite their support. The key breach came over the 1921 Licensing Bill which raised the question of whether Monmouthshire was part of Wales or England. This had become a particularly significant local issue, with the Liberals tending to the former position and the Conservatives to the latter. The Bill included Monmouthshire with Wales and so threatened early closing, whilst Haslam's support for the temperance movement provoked further hostility. Consequently the local Conservatives moved to adopt an official candidate of their own for the next general election, choosing Reginald Clarry on 26 July 1922. He received backing from the anti-Coalition wing of the Conservative Party, including endorsements in the Morning Post. His candidature was not well received by the Conservative leadership at Westminster, with Austen Chamberlain, leader of the Conservative MPs, requesting that Conservative Central Office should not aid Clarry's campaign, but crucially Clarry was still the official party nominee for the seat and it would be dangerous for any leader of the party to provoke a row by repudiating the official nominee.

== Vacancy ==
Lewis Haslam died on 12 September 1922 following a sudden illness.

== Candidates ==
The Conservatives ran the already selected Reginald Clarry, a self-made man who had worked as a civil engineer.

The Labour Party ran William Bowen, who had previously contested the seat in the 1918 general election. He was General Secretary of the Union of Post Office Workers.

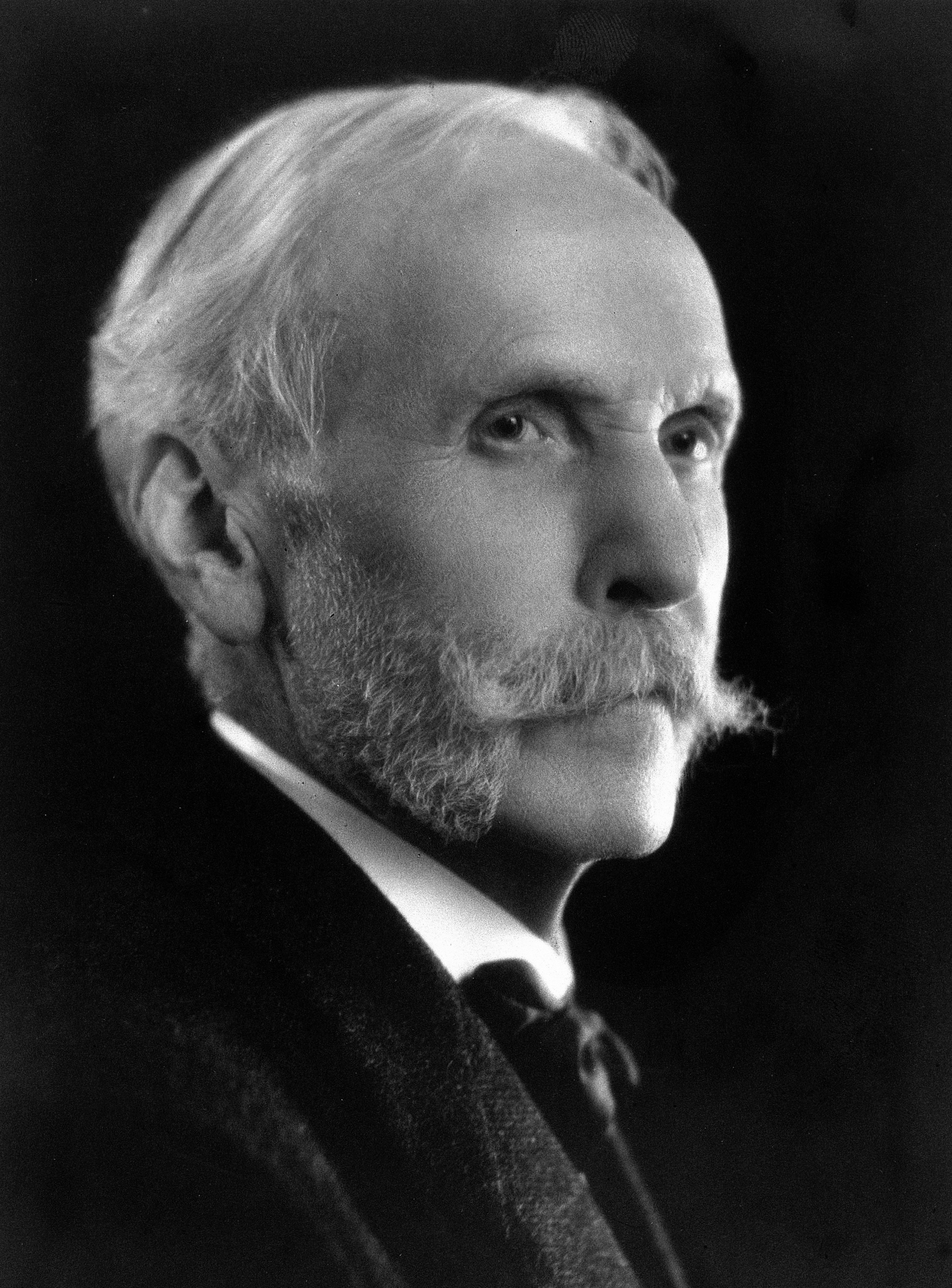
Garrod Thomas

The Liberal Party candidate proved the most crucial choice. The local association nominally supported David Lloyd George rather than H. H. Asquith in the split in the party, but by 1922 this may have been a tactical measure to prevent the establishment of a separate Lloyd George Liberal Party, as had happened in constituencies where the association supported Asquith. There was much uncertainty over what sort of Liberal candidate would be adopted, with the press reporting both that local Liberals wanted an anti-Coalition candidate but they appeared to approach prominent individuals from both factions of the party. The President of the local Liberal Association was Garrod Thomas, the former Liberal MP for South Monmouthshire. He was first approached to stand as Liberal candidate, however he was seen to be pro-Lloyd George and not favoured by those in the association who supported Asquith.

In the end they selected William Lyndon Moore, the Newport coroner, who ran as a "Liberal" and declined to run as either a Lloyd George supporter or an Asquithian but instead used the slogan "reunited Liberalism," implying opposition to the Coalition.

As a result there was no candidate in the election who was an official supporter of the Coalition.

== Campaign ==
Despite being traditionally seen as a by-election that determined the fate of the Coalition, the election largely ignored it. All three candidates denounced its continued existence and focused on both what would replace the Coalition and local issues.

One of the biggest issues revolved around alcohol, with the Conservative campaign opposing the Licensing Bill whilst both the Labour and Liberal campaigns regularly held meetings in the Temperance Hall and had strong support from prominent temperance campaigners. Clarry sought the traditional working-class support for the Conservatives that existed in Newport on the matter.

The candidates argued over local identity, with Moore claiming to be the only local man whilst Clarry hailed from Swansea and Bowen from London. Clarry countered, both by using a letterhead on all literature with a Newport address and by stressing his knowledge of industry and Newport's reliance upon it.

The question of which candidate was best placed to win proved crucial in what was regarded as a genuine three-way marginal contest, as this would determine which candidate would receive the votes opposed to them. Many expected Bowen to win for Labour and both the Conservative and Liberal supporting press tried to argue that the other candidate was out of the running. By the end of the campaign most expected Bowen to win with Clarry in second place and Moore a clear third.

== Result ==
Polling took place on 18 October 1922. The result was announced at 2am the next morning.

1922 Newport by-election
Party	Candidate	Votes	%	±%
Unionist	Reginald Clarry	13,515	40.0	N/A
Labour	William Bowen	11,425	33.8	−7.2
Liberal	William Lynden Moore	8,841	26.2	−30.2
Majority		2,090	6.2	N/A
Turnout		33,781	79.2	+17.0
Registered electors		42,645		
Unionist gain from Liberal		Swing		

== Consequences ==
Austen Chamberlain had been facing a growing rebellion amongst Conservative MPs over the Conservatives' continued support for the Coalition, and so had called a meeting of MPs at the Carlton Club to decide the issue. Expecting a Labour victory in Newport, the meeting was scheduled for 19 October in the hope that the result would persuade many Conservatives of the merits of remaining in alliance with the Liberals as the only way to keep Labour out of power.

The Carlton Club meeting took place nine hours after the declaration and many interpreted the result as a rejection of the Coalition, even though locally it appeared more a rejection of Labour and a vote for the Conservative candidate. The extent to which the by-election result alone influenced the outcome of the Conservative Party meeting is debated, but the meeting voted by 187:87 to leave the Coalition, with Austen Chamberlain resigning the leadership immediately afterwards.

== See also ==
- Newport constituency
- 1945 Newport by-election
- 1956 Newport by-election

== Sources ==
- Ramsden, John "The Newport by-election and the fall of the Coalition" in Cook, Chris and Ramsden, John (Eds) By-elections in British politics (UCL Press, 1997)
