= Mansion House, Newport =

- Plasty, Casnewydd
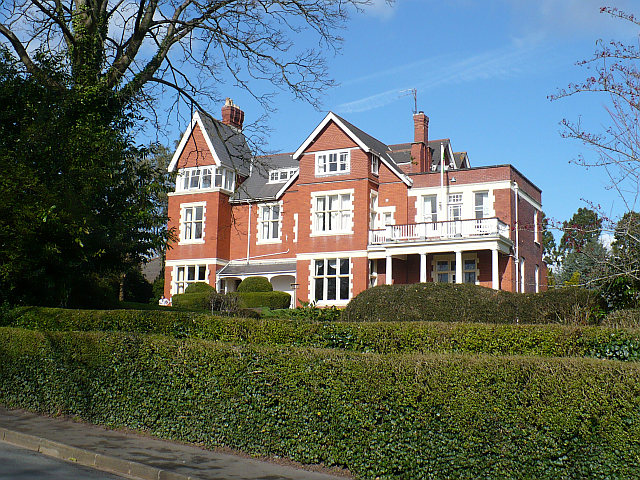
- The Mansion House – Newport's Register Office
- Interactive map of the Mansion House, Newport area

General information
- Type: Mansion
- Architectural style: Victorian
- Location: Stow Park Circle; NP20 4HQ, Newport, Wales
- Coordinates: 51°34′53.48″N 3°0′34.8″W
- Current tenants: Newport Registry Office
- Estimated completion: 1890
- Owner: Newport City Council

Other information
- Public transit: Newport railway station

Website
- newport.gov.uk

The Mansion House is a property in Stow Park Circle in Newport, Wales. It was the official residence of the Mayor of Newport, South Wales until 2009 and has since become the local register office.

== History ==
The house was commissioned by John Liscombe, a leather merchant and sadler, who established his business in Llanarth Street. He selected the site in Stow Park and bought it in four lots between 1886 and 1889. The house was designed in the Victorian style, built in red brick, and completed in around 1890. The design involved an asymmetrical main frontage of four bays facing onto Stow Park Circle. The first and third bays were fenestrated in a similar style with bi-partite or tri-partite windows on the ground floor and first floor and smaller windows in the gables above. The second bay featured a lean-to porch on the ground floor and a bi-partite window on the first floor, while the fourth bay featured a portico formed by four Doric order columns supporting a balcony: there was a French door on the first floor. The building was initially known as "Bron-y-gaer".

Liscombe went on to be Mayor of Newport in 1905 and used the house as his personal residence until his death in November 1914. It was then acquired by Sir Garrod Thomas of Clytha Park.

The house was bought by Newport Corporation for £3,250 for use as judges' lodgings in March 1939. Until that time the Monmouthshire Assizes were held at the Shire Hall, Monmouth, some 25 miles from Newport via a slow winding road. The quarter sessions were held at the Sessions House, Usk some 11 miles from Newport. As most of the business for the assizes and quarter sessions was provided by the inhabitants of Newport, there were many complaints about the inconvenience to witnesses and to the legal profession of the courts being located at Monmouth and Usk. This had been remedied by the creation of two courtrooms Civic Centre, but the Lord Chancellor had insisted on new judges' lodgings: hence the purchase of the house in Stow Park.

The Courts Act 1971 abolished assizes and quarter sessions and introduced the single national Crown Court. The government included a clause in Schedule 3 of the Courts Act to the effect that local authorities would cease to be under obligation to provide judges' lodgings after January 1975. From 1975 until 2009, the house was used exclusively by the council as the official residence of the mayor. It was refurbished in spring 2011 and re-opened as the city's register office in July 2011. The first wedding took place there that month.
