= Newport East (UK Parliament constituency) =

UK Parliament constituency (1983–)

Coordinates: 51.593°N 2.920°W

- County constituency for the House of Commons
- Boundary of Newport East in Wales
- Preserved county: Gwent
- Electorate: 76,159 (March 2020)

Current constituency
- Created: 1983
- Member of Parliament: Jessica Morden (Labour)
- Seats: One
- Created from: Newport and Monmouth

Overlaps
- Senedd: Casnewydd Islwyn

Newport East (Welsh: Dwyrain Casnewydd) is a constituency (Note: A borough constituency (for the purposes of election expenses and type of returning officer)) in the city of Newport, South Wales, represented in the House of Commons of the UK Parliament since 2005 by Jessica Morden of the Labour Party. (Note: As with all constituencies, the constituency elects one Member of Parliament (MP) by the first past the post system of election at least every five years.)

The constituency retained its name but its boundaries were substantially altered, as part of the 2023 review of Westminster constituencies under the June 2023 final recommendations of the Boundary Commission for Wales for the 2024 general election.

== History ==
Newport East was created when the former Newport borough constituency was split into two divisions in 1983. Until the changes coming into effect in 2024, it also included some rural areas, formerly part of Monmouth county constituency, with only minor boundary changes since the constituency was created. Unlike neighbouring Newport West, it has remained in Labour hands since its creation.

== Boundaries ==
1983–1997: The Borough of Newport wards 2, 4, 7, 9, 11, 13, and 18 to 20, and the District of Monmouth wards 14 and 15.

1997–2010: The Borough of Newport wards of Alway, Beechwood, Langstone, Llanwern, Lliswerry, Ringland, St Julians, and Victoria, and the Borough of Monmouth wards of Caldicot Castle, Dewstow, Magor with Undy, Rogiet, Severn, and West End.

2010–2024: The Newport County Borough electoral divisions of Alway, Beechwood, Langstone, Llanwern, Lliswerry, Ringland, St Julian's, and Victoria, and the Monmouthshire County electoral divisions of Caldicot Castle, Dewstow, Green Lane, Mill, Rogiet, Severn, The Elms, and West End.

2024–present: Under the 2023 review, the constituency was defined as being composed of the following wards of the City and County Borough of Newport, as they existed on 1 December 2020:

- Alway, Beechwood, Bettws, Caerleon, Langstone^{1}, Llanwern, Lliswerry, Malpas, Pillgwenlly, Ringland, St Julians, Shaftesbury, Stow Hill, and Victoria.

^{1} Renamed Bishton and Langstone following a local government boundary review which came into effect in May 2022.

As a result of the review, Newport West was abolished with approximately 45% of its electorate being added to Newport East (Bettws, Caerleon, Malpas, Pillgwenlly, Shaftesbury and Stow Hill wards). To partly compensate, the parts in Monmouthshire County were transferred to the re-established constituency of Monmouthshire.

Map of boundaries 2010–2024

Map of current boundaries

== Members of Parliament ==
Election	Member	Party
1983	Roy Hughes	Labour
1997	Alan Howarth	Labour
2005	Jessica Morden	Labour

== Elections ==
=== Elections in the 2020s ===
General election 2024: Newport East
Party	Candidate	Votes	%	±%
Labour	Jessica Morden	16,370	42.5	−5.0
Reform	Tommy Short	7,361	19.1	+13.0
Conservative	Rachel Buckler	6,487	16.8	−19.4
Plaid Cymru	Jonathan Clark	2,239	5.8	+3.2
Green	Lauren James	2,092	5.4	+3.5
Liberal Democrats	John Miller	2,045	5.3	−0.4
Independent	Pippa Bartolotti	1,802	4.7	N/A
Heritage	Mike Ford	135	0.4	N/A
Majority		9,009	23.4	+12.1
Turnout		38,531	50.1	−10.8
Registered electors		76,845		
Labour hold		Swing	−9.0	

=== Elections in the 2010s ===
2019 notional result (Note: Estimate of the 2019 general election result as if the revised boundaries recommended under the 2023 boundary review were in place)
Party	Vote	%
Labour	22,038	47.5
Conservative	16,799	36.2
Brexit Party	2,843	6.1
Liberal Democrats	2,651	5.7
Plaid Cymru	1,203	2.6
Green Party	871	1.9
Majority	5,239	11.3
Turnout	46,405	60.9
Electorate	76,159	

General election 2019: Newport East
Party	Candidate	Votes	%	±%
Labour	Jessica Morden	16,125	44.4	−12.1
Conservative	Mark Brown	14,133	39.0	+4.2
Brexit Party	Julie Price	2,454	6.8	N/A
Liberal Democrats	Mike Hamilton	2,121	5.8	+3.2
Plaid Cymru	Cameron Wixcey	872	2.4	±0.0
Green	Peter Varley	577	1.6	N/A
Rejected ballots		80		
Majority		1,992	5.4	−15.7
Turnout		36,282	62.0	−2.3
Registered electors		58,554		
Labour hold		Swing	−8.2	

Of the 80 rejected ballots:

- 61 were either unmarked or it was uncertain who the vote was for.
- 19 voted for more than one candidate.

General election 2017: Newport East
Party	Candidate	Votes	%	±%
Labour	Jessica Morden	20,804	56.5	+15.8
Conservative	Natasha Asghar	12,801	34.8	+7.5
UKIP	Ian Gorman	1,180	3.2	−15.2
Liberal Democrats	Pete Brown	966	2.6	−3.8
Plaid Cymru	Cameron Wixcey	881	2.4	−1.1
Independent	Nadeem Ahmed	188	0.5	N/A
Rejected ballots		68		
Majority		8,003	21.7	+8.3
Turnout		36,820	64.3	+1.6
Registered electors		57,211		
Labour hold		Swing	+4.2	

Of the 68 rejected ballots:

- 34 were either unmarked or it was uncertain who the vote was for.
- 19 voted for more than one candidate.
- 15 had writing or mark by which the voter could be identified.

General election 2015: Newport East
Party	Candidate	Votes	%	±%
Labour	Jessica Morden	14,290	40.7	+3.7
Conservative	Natasha Asghar	9,585	27.3	+4.3
UKIP	David Stock	6,466	18.4	+16.4
Liberal Democrats	Paul Halliday	2,251	6.4	−25.8
Plaid Cymru	Tony Salkeld	1,231	3.5	+1.4
Green	David Mclean	887	2.5	N/A
Socialist Labour	Shangara Singh Bhatoe	398	1.1	+0.7
Majority		4,705	13.4	+8.6
Turnout		35,108	62.7	−0.9
Registered electors		56,015		
Labour hold		Swing	-0.3	

General election 2010: Newport East
Party	Candidate	Votes	%	±%
Labour	Jessica Morden	12,744	37.0	−8.2
Liberal Democrats	Ed Townsend	11,094	32.2	+8.5
Conservative	Dawn Parry	7,918	23.0	−0.4
BNP	Keith Jones	1,168	3.4	N/A
Plaid Cymru	Fiona Cross	724	2.1	−1.7
UKIP	David Rowlands	677	2.0	−1.0
Socialist Labour	Elizabeth Screen	123	0.4	−0.4
Majority		1,650	4.8	−16.7
Turnout		34,448	63.6	+5.7
Registered electors		54,437		
Labour hold		Swing	-8.3	

=== Elections in the 2000s ===
General election 2005: Newport East
Party	Candidate	Votes	%	±%
Labour	Jessica Morden	14,389	45.2	−9.5
Liberal Democrats	Ed Townsend	7,551	23.7	+9.7
Conservative	Matthew Collings	7,459	23.4	+0.2
Plaid Cymru	Mohammad Asghar	1,221	3.8	−1.1
UKIP	Roger Thomas	945	3.0	+1.7
Socialist Labour	Elizabeth Screen	260	0.8	−0.5
Majority		6,838	21.5	−10.0
Turnout		31,825	57.9	+3.2
Registered electors		54,941		
Labour hold		Swing	-9.6	

General election 2001: Newport East
Party	Candidate	Votes	%	±%
Labour	Alan Howarth	17,120	54.7	−3.0
Conservative	Ian Oakley	7,246	23.2	+1.8
Liberal Democrats	Alistair Cameron	4,394	14.0	+3.6
Plaid Cymru	Madoc Batcup	1,519	4.9	+3.0
Socialist Labour	Elizabeth Screen	420	1.3	−3.9
UKIP	Neal Reynolds	410	1.3	N/A
Communist	Robert Griffiths	173	0.6	N/A
Majority		9,874	31.5	−4.8
Turnout		31,282	54.7	−18.4
Registered electors		57,219		
Labour hold		Swing	-2.4	

=== Elections in the 1990s ===
General election 1997: Newport East
Party	Candidate	Votes	%	±%
Labour	Alan Howarth	21,481	57.7	+2.7
Conservative	David Evans	7,958	21.4	−10.0
Liberal Democrats	Alistair Cameron	3,880	10.4	−1.5
Socialist Labour	Arthur Scargill	1,951	5.2	N/A
Referendum	Edward Chaney-Davis	1,267	3.4	N/A
Plaid Cymru	Christopher Holland	721	1.9	+0.2
Majority		13,523	36.3	+12.7
Turnout		37,258	73.1	−7.9
Registered electors		50,676		
Labour hold		Swing	+6.3	

General election 1992: Newport East
Party	Candidate	Votes	%	±%
Labour	Roy Hughes	23,050	55.0	+5.9
Conservative	Angela A. Emmett	13,151	31.4	−0.8
Liberal Democrats	William A. Oliver	4,991	11.9	−5.8
Plaid Cymru (Green)	Stephen M. Ainley	716	1.7	+0.6
Majority		9,899	23.6	+6.7
Turnout		41,908	81.2	+0.3
Registered electors		51,603		
Labour hold		Swing		

=== Elections in the 1980s ===
General election 1987: Newport East
Party	Candidate	Votes	%	±%
Labour	Roy Hughes	20,518	49.1	+9.5
Conservative	Graham Webster-Gardiner	13,454	32.2	−0.9
SDP	Frances David	7,383	17.7	−7.9
Plaid Cymru	Gareth Butler	458	1.1	−0.6
Majority		7,064	16.9	+10.4
Turnout		41,813	79.9	+3.3
Registered electors		52,199		
Labour hold		Swing		

General election 1983: Newport East
Party	Candidate	Votes	%	±%
Labour	Roy Hughes	15,931	39.6	
Conservative	Roy Thomason	13,301	33.1	
SDP	Frances David	10,293	25.6	
Plaid Cymru	David Thomas	697	1.7	
Majority		2,630	6.5	
Turnout		40,222	76.6	
Registered electors		52,503		
Labour win (new seat)				

== See also ==
- Newport East (Senedd constituency)
- Newport West (Senedd constituency)
- List of parliamentary constituencies in Gwent
- List of parliamentary constituencies in Wales
