= Donald Box =

Welsh stockbroker and Conservative politician (1917–1993)

Donald Stewart Box (22 November 1917 – 12 July 1993) was a Welsh stockbroker and Conservative politician.

== Early and military career ==
Born in Cardiff, Box was educated at The Cathedral School, Llandaff, St John's School in Pinner, and Harrow County School for Boys. He joined the stockbrokers' company Henry J. Thomas at the age of 17. At the outbreak of the Second World War he joined the Royal Air Force and served in the middle east in Egypt, Palestine and Transjordan. This experience gave him knowledge and interest in the Middle East refugee problem which he took up later in life.

== Political involvement ==
He returned to Cardiff following the war and became a member of the Cardiff Stock Exchange and a partner in Lyddon & Company, stockbrokers. Having joined the Young Conservatives, Box graduated to the Conservative Party and fought Newport at the 1955 general election and a by-election the following year.

== Parliamentary career ==
For the 1959 general election, Box was selected for Cardiff North and won the seat. He made his mark as a strong opponent of strikes (especially unofficial ones). He championed the cause of business and of redevelopment of Cardiff's docklands, and blamed any failures on the left. In line with his constituency, in which a large proportion of the property was leasehold, he supported leasehold reform.

Box had good looks and an easygoing manner, who could come up with amusing phrases denigrating his political opponents; in 1966, despite being nearly 50 and having been an MP for six years, he was described as "young and inexperienced" by Speaker Horace King. He was a strong opponent of the bill to suspend capital punishment in 1965, and criticised excessive welfare payments.

== Stockbroking ==
After losing his seat in the 1966 general election, Box returned to Lyddon & Company. From 1973 he was a member of the London Stock Exchange when regional members were allowed. He became a Director of N.M. Rothschild in 1988. He died of cancer.

Parliament of the United Kingdom
| Preceded by David Llewellyn | Member of Parliament for Cardiff North; 1959–1966 | Succeeded by Ted Rowlands |
