= Peter Freeman (politician) =

British politician (1888–1956)

- Freeman in 1931

Member of Parliament for Newport
- In office 26 July 1945 – 19 May 1956
- Preceded by: Ronald Bell
- Succeeded by: Frank Soskice

Member of Parliament for Brecon and Radnor
- In office 30 May 1929 – 7 October 1931
- Preceded by: Walter Hall
- Succeeded by: Walter Hall

Personal details
- Born: 19 October 1888 London, England
- Died: 19 May 1956 (aged 67)
- Spouse: Ella Drummond Torrance
- Children: 2
- Occupation: Politician, writer

Peter Freeman (19 October 1888 – 19 May 1956) was a British Labour Party politician, tennis champion, animal rights and vegetarianism activist, and Theosophist.

== Biography ==
Freeman was born on 19 October 1888 in London, one of nine children of George James Freeman who was in the tobacco industry.

He was educated at the Haberdashers' School before entering the family business and he became managing directory of the Freeman factory in Cardiff, Wales. He was a noted lawn tennis player and won the Welsh Championship in 1919 and was also described as an expert swimmer.

He was elected as member of parliament (MP) for Brecon and Radnorshire at the 1929 general election, defeating the Conservative MP Walter D'Arcy Hall by only 187 votes. When Labour split at the 1931 general election over Ramsay MacDonald's formation of a National Government, D'Arcy Hall retook the seat with a majority of over 8,000.

Freeman unsuccessfully stood at the 1935 general election in the Newport constituency, losing by 1,545 votes to the Conservative MP Reginald Clarry. When Clarry died in January 1945, Freeman did not contest the by-election on 17 May. However, at the general election in July 1945, he took the seat with a majority of 9,091 votes over Clarry's Conservative successor Ronald McMillan Bell. He withdrew from his company responsibilities to devote himself to "Parliamentary, philanthropic and social obligations".

Freeman held the seat until his death in 1956 at the age of 67. The resulting 1956 Newport by-election was won by the Labour candidate Frank Soskice, the former Attorney General.

Freeman had married Ella Drummond Torrance and they had a son and daughter.

== Personal life ==
=== Theosophy ===
Freeman was the general secretary of the Theosophical Society in Wales from 1922 to 1944. In 1924, he authored a pamphlet Druids and Theosophy.

Freeman contributed the chapter "The Practical Application of Theosophy to Politics and Government" to D. D. Kanga's book Where Theosophy and Science Meet.

=== Vegetarianism ===
Although his wealth came from the tobacco industry Freeman was a non-smoker and vegetarian. He served as president of the Vegetarian Society from 1933 and 1938.

Freeman supported animal rights and colonial freedom. He was also an anti-vivisection campaigner.

== Selected publications ==
- Druids and Theosophy (1924)
- Our Younger Brothers: The Animals (1926)
- A Vegetarian Looks at the World (The Theosophist, 1951)
- The World Food Crisis Solved by a Vegetarian (1956)

== Bibliography ==
- Craig, F. W. S. (1983) [1969]. British parliamentary election results 1918-1949 (3rd ed.). Chichester: Parliamentary Research Services. ISBN 0-900178-06-X.
- Leigh Rayment's Historical List of MPs

Parliament of the United Kingdom
Preceded by Walter Hall	Member of Parliament for Brecon and Radnorshire; 1929–1931	Succeeded by Walter Hall
Preceded by Ronald Bell	Member of Parliament for Newport; 1945–1956	Succeeded by Sir Frank Soskice
