= William Bowen (British politician) =

British trade unionist and politician

Sir William Bowen CBE
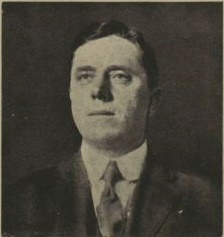
- Bowen in 1920

Member of Parliament for Crewe
- In office 30 May 1929 – 7 October 1931
- Preceded by: Ernest Craig
- Succeeded by: Donald Somervell

Chairman of the London County Council
- In office 1949–1952
- Preceded by: Walter Richard Owen
- Succeeded by: Edwin Bayliss

Personal details
- Born: John William Bowen; 8 May 1876 Gowerton, Glamorgan, Wales
- Died: 1 April 1965 (aged 88)

Sir John William Bowen CBE (8 May 1876 – 1 April 1965), known as William Bowen, was a British trade unionist and politician.

Born and educated in Gowerton in Glamorgan, Bowen left school aged eleven to work at the Post Office. He soon became an active trade unionist, joining the Postmen's Federation, of which he became chair in 1916. He was also active in the Labour Party and stood unsuccessfully for it in Newport, Monmouthshire at the 1918 general election and in several elections subsequently.

In 1919, Bowen moved to London to take up the role of treasurer of the Postmen's Federation. In this post, he was involved in negotiating the merger of various unions to form the Union of Post Office Workers, and was elected as its first general secretary. He also served on the General Council of the Trades Union Congress and was on the council of Ruskin College for many years, becoming its chairman in 1948.

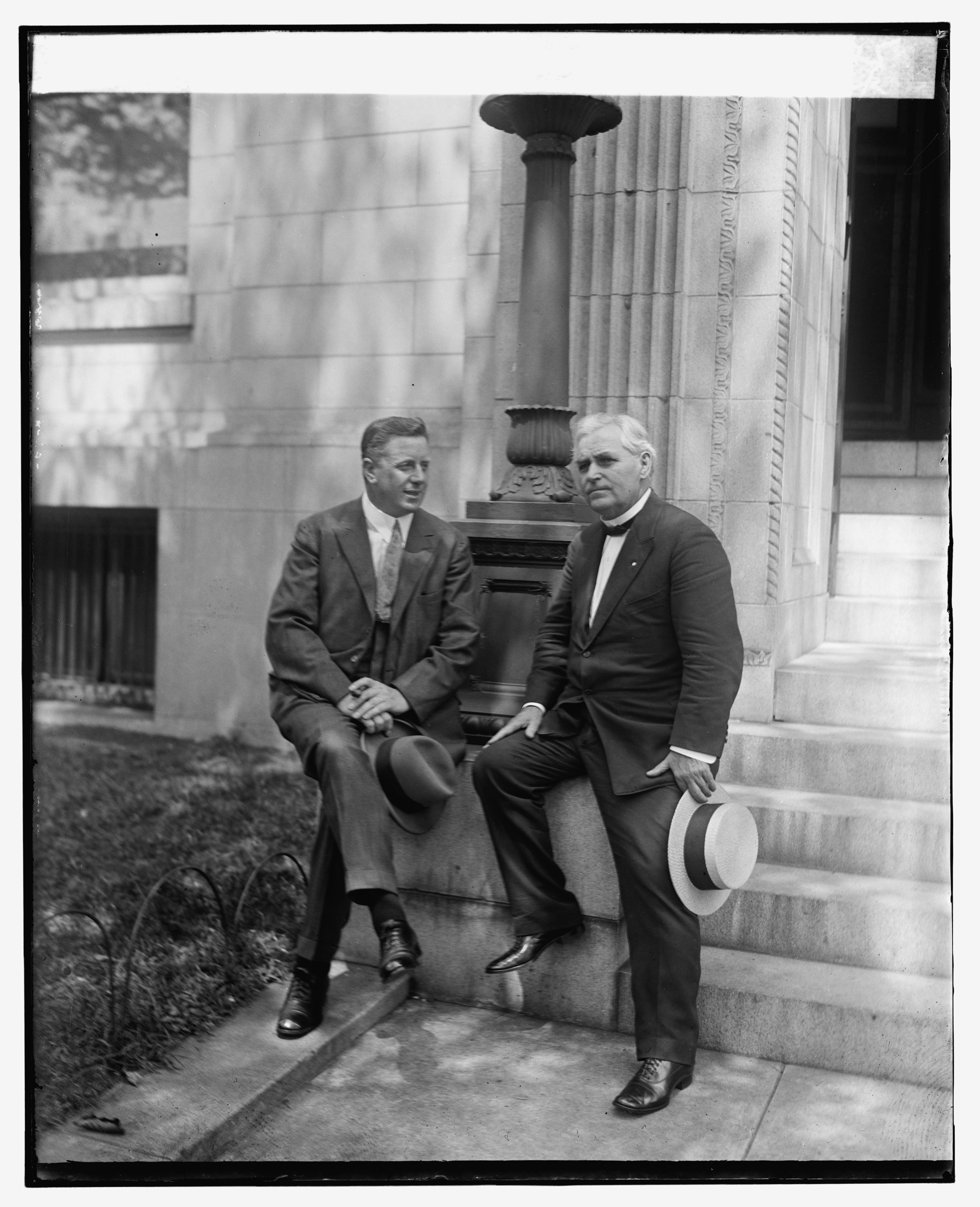
Bowen in 1925

Bowen stood for election repeatedly in Newport, at a 1922 by-election and the 1922, 1923 and 1924 general elections, but was never elected. At the 1929 general election, he instead stood in Crewe and immediately won the seat, but he lost it in 1931 and failed to win it back in 1935.

Bowen stood down as secretary of the Post Office Workers in 1936, and was made a Commander of the Order of the British Empire three years later.

In 1940, he was elected to London County Council (LCC) for Wandsworth Central. He represented the LCC on the Nurses Salaries Committee chaired by Lord Rushcliffe which published two reports in 1943

He lost the LCC seat in 1949, but despite no longer being a member of the council, the Labour group ensured his election as the council's Chair. He served in the position for three years, winning an aldermanic seat in 1951 to remain on the council after his time as chair finished. He was knighted in the 1953 Coronation Honours List, and remained on the council until 1961.

Trade union offices
Preceded by New position	General Secretary of the Union of Post Office Workers; 1919–1936	Succeeded by T. J. Hodgson
Preceded by New position	President of the Postal, Telegraph and Telephone International; 1920–1949	Succeeded by Charles Geddes
Parliament of the United Kingdom
Preceded by Ernest Craig	Member of Parliament for Crewe; 1929–1931	Succeeded by Donald Somervell
Civic offices
Preceded by Walter Richard Owen	Chairman of the London County Council; 1949–1952	Succeeded by Edwin Bayliss
