= 1945 Newport by-election =

UK parliamentary by-election

The 1945 Newport by-election was a parliamentary by-election held on 17 May 1945 for the British House of Commons constituency of Newport in Monmouthshire. It was the last by-election of the 1935–1945 Parliament.

The seat had become vacant on the death of the constituency's Conservative Member of Parliament (MP), Sir Reginald Clarry, on 17 January 1945, aged 62. He had held the seat since a 1922 by-election, with a two-year gap after his defeat at the 1929 general election (he was re-elected at the 1931 election).

== Candidates ==
The Conservative Party selected as its candidate Ronald Bell, an Oxford-educated barrister who had been defeated at the Caerphilly by-election in 1939. In keeping with a war-time electoral pact, the Labour and Liberal parties did not field candidates, and Bell's only opponent was Robert Edwards, the Chairman of the Independent Labour Party (ILP).

== Result ==
On a considerably reduced turnout, Bell held the seat for the Conservatives with a majority of 2,702 votes; Edwards had won 45.5% of the votes, one of the ILP's best results for years.

However, Bell's tenure as MP for Newport was brief. The date of the general election was announced on 23 May, and Parliament was dissolved on 15 June. In the Labour Party's landslide victory at general election on 5 July 1945, Bell was heavily defeated by the Labour Party candidate, Peter Freeman.

He returned to the House of Commons at the 1950 general election as MP for South Buckinghamshire.

1945 Newport by-election
Party	Candidate	Votes	%	±%
Conservative	Ronald Bell	16,424	54.5	+2.8
Ind. Labour Party	Bob Edwards	13,722	45.5	N/A
Majority		2,702	9.0	+5.6
Turnout		40,146	50.0	−29.4
Registered electors		60,248		
Conservative hold		Swing	+1.4	

== See also ==
- Newport constituency
- 1922 Newport by-election
- 1956 Newport by-election
- Newport
- Lists of United Kingdom by-elections
- United Kingdom by-election records

== Sources ==
- Craig, F. W. S. (1983) [1969]. British parliamentary election results 1918–1949 (3rd ed.). Chichester: Parliamentary Research Services. ISBN 0-900178-06-X.
