= James Walker (Labour politician) =

British politician (1883–1945)

James Walker (12 May 1883 – 5 January 1945) was a Labour Party politician.

At Ruskin College he gained distinction in economics and social science. For years he was organiser of the Steel Smelters Society, and for many years a member of Glasgow Town Council. Walker became Member of Parliament (MP) in 1929, representing the Newport constituency in Monmouthshire from 1929 to 1931 and Motherwell from 1935 until he was knocked down and killed by an Army lorry in Brighton, in 1945, aged 61. At the time of his death, Walker was Political Secretary of the Iron and Steel Trades Confederation.

Parliament of the United Kingdom
Preceded by Reginald Clarry	Member of Parliament for Newport; 1929–1931	Succeeded by Reginald Clarry
Preceded by Thomas Ormiston	Member of Parliament for Motherwell; 1935–1945	Succeeded by Robert McIntyre
Trade union offices
Preceded by William Shaw	President of the Scottish Trades Union Congress; 1921	Succeeded by Charles Gallie
Preceded by Jack Jones and J. W. Ogden	Trades Union Congress representative to the American Federation of Labour; 1921; With: J. H. Thomas	Succeeded by Edward L. Poulton and Herbert Smith
Party political offices
Preceded by Barbara Ayrton-Gould	Chair of the Labour Party; 1940–1941	Succeeded by Walter Green
