= Garrod Thomas =

Welsh politician (1853–1931)

Sir Abraham Garrod Thomas JP
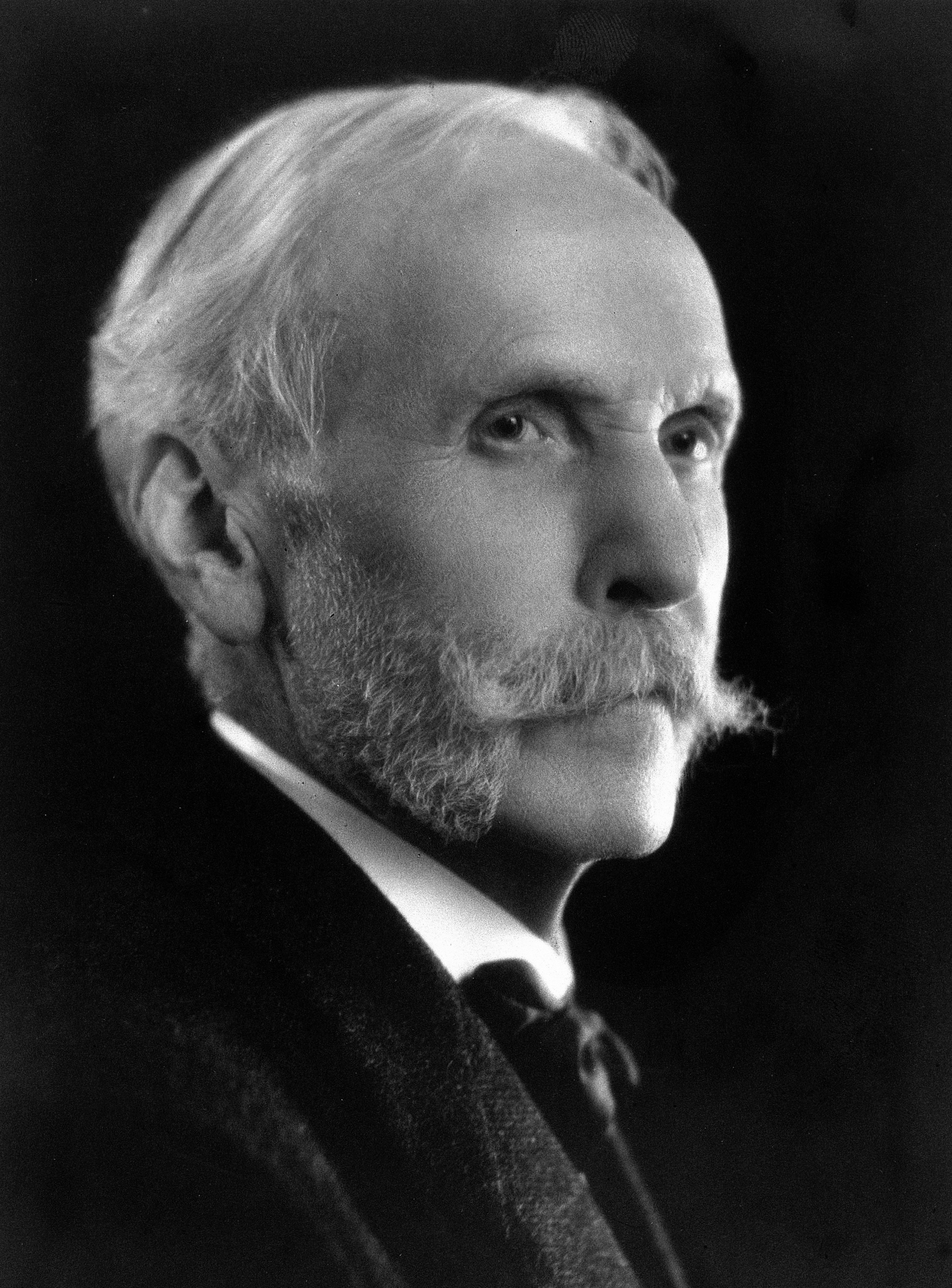

Member of Parliament for South Monmouthshire
- In office 13 July 1917 – 25 November 1918
- Preceded by: Ivor Herbert
- Succeeded by: Office Abolished

Personal details
- Born: 5 October 1853 Panteryrod, Cardiganshire, Wales
- Died: 30 January 1931 (aged 77)
- Relatives: John Aeron Thomas (brother)
- Education: Milford Haven
- Alma mater: University of Edinburgh
- Occupation: Physician; Philanthropist; Politician
- Known for: MP for South Monmouthshire; Founded the South Wales Argus

Sir Abraham Garrod Thomas (5 October 1853 – 30 January 1931) was a Welsh physician, philanthropist, magistrate, politician and Member of Parliament.

== Life ==
He was born at Panteryrod, near Aberaeron, in Cardiganshire, the son of Lewis Thomas; his older brother John Aeron Thomas, a solicitor and businessman, was also a Member of Parliament. He was a Welsh speaker to age 13, and was educated at Milford Haven. At the University of Edinburgh he graduated M.B. in 1876, and that year also became a Member of the Royal College of Surgeons of England. After graduation he studied at Berlin and Vienna. He became M.D. at Edinburgh in 1878, and started work in Newport, Monmouthshire. In 1892 he founded the South Wales Argus. In 1915 he donated the house at 25 Clytha Park, Newport for the treatment of tuberculous children. He owned the Mansion House, Newport.

== Politics ==
Thomas was appointed High Sheriff of Cardiganshire for 1900. He was elected Liberal Member of Parliament for South Monmouthshire in a 1917 by-election, but did not stand again. At the time of the Newport by-election, in 1922, he was President of the local Liberal Association and was first approached to stand as Liberal candidate, but in the end William Lyndon Moore was chosen, a neutral in the conflict between Asquith Liberals and supporters of Lloyd George.

== Family ==
In 1879 Thomas married Eleanor, daughter of Richard Hughes Richards of Newport. The chemist Richard Noel Garrod-Thomas was their son.

Parliament of the United Kingdom
Preceded by Col Ivor Herbert	Member of Parliament for South Monmouthshire; 1917–1918	Constituency abolished
