= Charles Edwards (Labour politician) =

British politician

The Right Honourable Sir Charles Edwards CBE JP
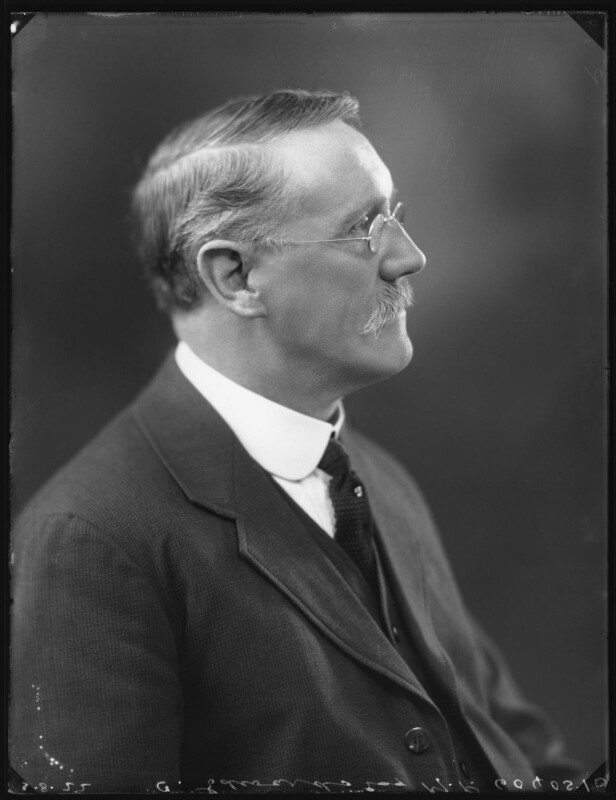
- Edwards

Member of Parliament for Bedwellty
- In office 1918–1950
- Preceded by: Constituency established
- Succeeded by: Harold Finch

Personal details
- Born: 19 February 1867
- Died: 15 June 1954 (aged 87)
- Party: Labour
- Children: One son and one daughter
- Parents: John Edwards (father); Catherine Edwards (mother)
- Education: National School, Llangunllo, Radnorshire

Sir Charles Edwards (19 February 1867 – 15 June 1954) was a Labour Party politician in the United Kingdom.

Edwards initially served as an Assistant Miners' Agent in the Blackwood Offices of the South Wales Miners' Federation where he and his wife lived in the attached housing accommodation. Afterwards they moved to Risca.

Edwards was elected at the 1918 general election as Member of Parliament (MP) for the newly-created Bedwellty constituency in Monmouthshire. He held the seat until he retired from Parliament at the 1950 general election.

Edwards was made a Privy Councillor in 1940. And from 1940 to 1942 he was government chief whip in the war-time Coalition Government.

Parliament of the United Kingdom
| New constituency | Member of Parliament for Bedwellty; 1918–1950 | Succeeded by Sir Harold Finch |
Political offices
| Preceded by David Margesson | Parliamentary Secretary to the Treasury (Government Chief Whip) (with James Stuart); 1940–1942 | Succeeded by James Stuart and William Whiteley |
