= Lewis Haslam =

British politician

Lewis Haslam, circa 1905.

Lewis Haslam (25 April 1856 – 12 September 1922), was a Liberal Party Member of Parliament (MP) in Wales, representing Monmouth Boroughs from 1906 to 1918 and then Newport from 1918 until his death in 1922.

== Family and education ==
Haslam was the son of John Haslam of Gilnow House in Bolton in Lancashire. He was educated at University College School and University College, London. In 1893, he married Helen Norma Dixon of Watlington, Oxfordshire.

== Career ==
Haslam was the director of cotton spinning and manufacturing companies. He has been classified as a genuinely second generation self-made man and was among the most wealthy MPs of his time. He also served as a Justice of the Peace for the county of Lancaster.

== Politics ==
At the 1892 general election he contested the Westhoughton Division of Lancashire, in opposition to Lord Stanley reducing the Conservative majority by 500 votes. He does not appear to have been a candidate in 1895 but in 1900 he stood in Stamford in Lincolnshire, again without success.

He was eventually returned to the House of Commons at the 1906 Liberal landslide at Monmouth.

General election 1906 Monmouth Boroughs Electorate 11,207
Party	Candidate	Votes	%	±%
Liberal	Lewis Haslam	4,531	44.7	−3.4
Conservative	E E Micholls	3,939	38.8	−13.1
Labour Repr. Cmte.	James Whinstone	1,678	16.5	n/a
Majority		592	5.9	7.7
Turnout			90.6	
Liberal gain from Conservative		Swing	+4.8	

General election January 1910 Monmouth Boroughs Electorate 12,934
Party	Candidate	Votes	%	±%
Liberal	Lewis Haslam	6,496	54.8	+10.1
Conservative	Sir Charles William Cayzer	5,391	45.2	+6.4
Majority			9.6	3.7
Turnout				
Liberal hold		Swing	+1.9	

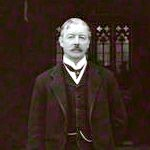
Lewis Haslam in 1911, (Portrait by Sir Benjamin Stone)

General election December 1910 Monmouth Boroughs Electorate 12,934
Party	Candidate	Votes	%	±%
Liberal	Lewis Haslam	6,154	54.9	+0.1
Conservative	Gerald de La Pryme Hargreaves	5,056	45.1	−0.1
Majority		1,098	9.8	+0.2
Turnout			86.7	
Liberal hold		Swing	-0.0	

He was a supporter of the coalition government of David Lloyd George and at the 1918 was a recipient of the government coupon, gaining the support of the local Conservative and Liberal Associations.

Along with fellow Coalition Liberal Edgar Rees Jones of the Merthyr constituency, Haslam played a minor role in the discussions behind the Government of Ireland Bill. Haslam in particular was strongly opposed to giving the Irish Parliament control of its own taxes.

The 1922 Newport by-election held after his death marked the end of the Lloyd George Coalition Government.

Parliament of the United Kingdom
Preceded by Joseph Lawrence	Member of Parliament for Monmouth Boroughs; 1906–1918	Constituency abolished
New constituency	Member of Parliament for Newport; 1918–1922	Succeeded by Reginald Clarry
