= 1956 Newport by-election =

UK parliamentary by-election

The 1956 Newport by-election was a parliamentary by-election held on 6 July 1956 for the British House of Commons constituency of Newport in Monmouthshire.

The seat had become vacant when the constituency's Labour Member of Parliament (MP), Peter Freeman had died on 19 May 1956, aged 67. He had held the seat since the 1945 general election, having previously been MP for Brecon and Radnorshire from 1929 to 1931.

== Candidates ==
The Labour candidate was Sir Frank Soskice, who had been Solicitor General and then Attorney General in the Labour Government 1945-1951. His Sheffield Neepsend constituency had been abolished for the 1955 general election.

The Conservative Party selected as its candidate Donald Box, a stockbroker from Cardiff who had contested the seat at the 1955 general election. The Liberal Party did not field a candidate, and third candidate was Emrys Roberts of Plaid Cymru.

== Result ==
Soskice held the seat with a majority higher than that achieved by Freeman the previous year. He held the seat until he retired from the House of Commons at the 1966 general election, having been Home Secretary from 1964 to 1965.

Box was elected at the 1959 general election in Cardiff North, and held that seat until 1966.

1956 Newport by-election
Party	Candidate	Votes	%	±%
Labour	Frank Soskice	29,205	56.3	+2.6
Conservative	Donald Box	20,720	39.9	−5.4
Plaid Cymru	Emrys Roberts	1,978	3.8	N/A
Majority		8,485	16.3	+8.9
Turnout		51,903	72.1	−9.5
Registered electors		71,943		
Labour hold		Swing	+4.0	

== See also ==
- Newport constituency
- 1922 Newport by-election
- 1945 Newport by-election
- Newport
- Lists of United Kingdom by-elections
- United Kingdom by-election records
