= Roy Hughes, Baron Islwyn =

British politician (1925–2003)

The Right Honourable The Lord Islwyn DL

Member of the House of Lords
- Lord Temporal
- Life peerage 25 October 1997 – 19 December 2003

Member of Parliament
- In office 31 March 1966 – 8 April 1997
- Preceded by: Frank Soskice
- Succeeded by: Alan Howarth
- Constituency: Newport (1966–1983); Newport East (1983–1997)

Personal details
- Born: 9 June 1925
- Died: 19 December 2003 (aged 78)

Royston John Hughes, Baron Islwyn, DL (9 June 1925 – 19 December 2003) was a British Labour Party politician from Wales, and a trade union organiser. He served as Member of Parliament (MP) for Newport from 1966 to 1983, and for Newport East from 1983 until his retirement at the 1997 general election. He accepted a life peerage upon his retirement.

== Early life ==
Hughes was born in the Monmouthshire town of Pontllanfraith located in the valley north of his later constituency of Newport and worked as a miner from 1940 until 1943, completing grammar school at Pontllanfraith. He then enlisted into the British Army and served with the 2nd battalion of the Welch Regiment.

After demobilisation in 1946, Hughes became a Labour Party member and moved to Coventry where he worked as a manager for the Standard Motor Company, where he obtained a degree from Ruskin College, Oxford and became an administrator for Standard Motor from 1957 until 1966. He then became a union leader, working as an officer of the TGWU from 1959 to 1966. He was a councillor on Coventry City Council and secretary of Coventry Labour Party from 1962.

== Parliamentary career ==
At the 1966 general election, he was elected to Parliament and became MP for Newport, replacing former Home Secretary Sir Frank Soskice, winning a large majority of votes. In his maiden speech, he praised the current government for providing pensioners with fuel benefits.

Later, he became known for his pro-union viewpoint, as well as support for what he termed the unalienable rights of the Palestinian people. He claimed that in order to "get a fair picture of Industry, he would read the Morning Star." He also sponsored a bill to protect badgers in 1991, and was an honorary member of several football and cricket teams.

In 1994, he was one of six Labour MPs who voted against any reduction in the age of consent for homosexuals. At the time of the vote in question the age of consent was 21, and the proposal was that it be reduced to 18).

On 25 October 1997 Hughes was created a life peer taking the title Baron Islwyn, of Casnewydd in the County of Gwent.

== Personal life ==
Hughes married Marion Appleyard in 1957 and they had three daughters.

== Arms ==
Coat of arms of Roy Hughes, Baron Islwyn

Crest
A demi dragon Gules supporting with both feet a miner’s safety lamp Or.
Escutcheon
Per pale Gules and Sable between two flaunches conjoined to a fess Argent thereron two flaunches that on the dexter Gules and that on the sinister Sable conjoined to a bar per pale Gules and Sable two roundels Argent each ensigned by an ancient crown Or and charged with a fleur-de-lis per pale Gules and Sable.
Supporters
On either side a badger sejant erect reguardant Proper gorged with an ancient crown.
Motto
Chwarae Teg

Parliament of the United Kingdom
Preceded by Frank Soskice	Member of Parliament for Newport; 1966–1983	Constituency abolished
New constituency	Member of Parliament for Newport East; 1983–1997	Succeeded by Alan Howarth
