= Alan Howarth, Baron Howarth of Newport =

British politician (1944–2025)

The Right Honourable The Lord Howarth of Newport CBE PC
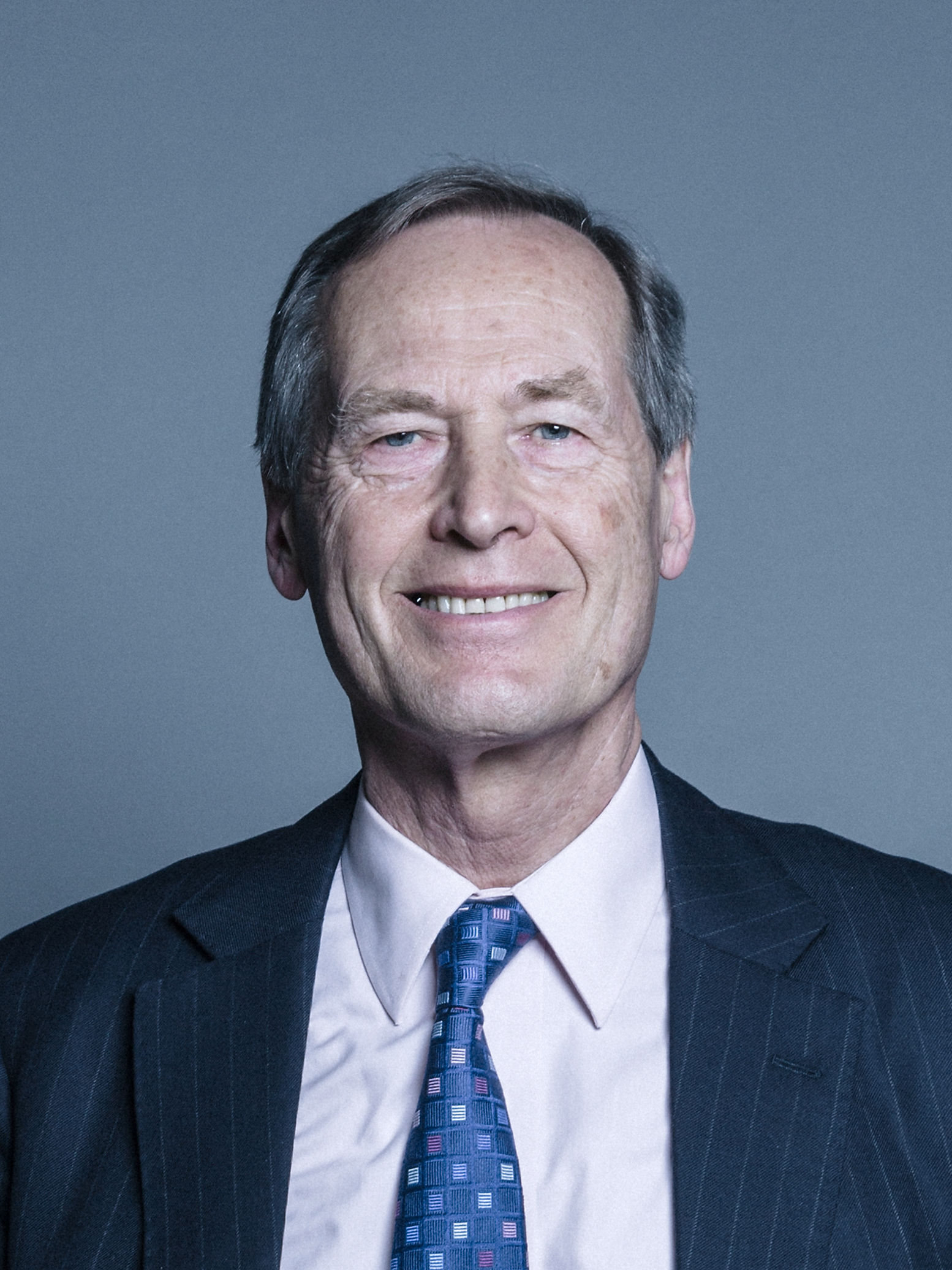
- Official portrait, 2018

Parliamentary Under-Secretary of State for the Arts
- In office 28 July 1998 – 7 June 2001
- Prime Minister: Tony Blair
- Preceded by: Mark Fisher
- Succeeded by: The Baroness Blackstone

Parliamentary Under-Secretary of State for Education
- In office 5 May 1997 – 28 July 1998
- Prime Minister: Tony Blair
- Preceded by: Jim Paice
- Succeeded by: Margaret Hodge
- In office 24 July 1989 – 28 November 1992
- Prime Minister: Margaret Thatcher; John Major
- Preceded by: John Butcher
- Succeeded by: Tim Boswell

Lord Commissioner of the Treasury
- In office 27 July 1988 – 24 July 1989
- Prime Minister: Margaret Thatcher
- Preceded by: Mark Lennox-Boyd
- Succeeded by: David Heathcoat-Amory

Member of the House of Lords
- Lord Temporal
- Life peerage 15 June 2005 – 10 September 2025

Member of Parliament for Newport East
- In office 1 May 1997 – 11 April 2005
- Preceded by: Roy Hughes
- Succeeded by: Jessica Morden

Member of Parliament for Stratford-on-Avon
- In office 9 June 1983 – 8 April 1997
- Preceded by: Angus Maude
- Succeeded by: John Maples

Personal details
- Born: Alan Thomas Howarth; 11 June 1944 Marylebone, London, England
- Died: 10 September 2025 (aged 81)
- Party: Labour (1995–2025)
- Other political affiliations: Conservative (until 1995)
- Spouse: Gillian Chance (m. 1967; div. 1996)
- Children: 4
- Education: King's College, Cambridge

Alan Thomas Howarth, Baron Howarth of Newport, CBE, PC (11 June 1944 – 10 September 2025) was a British Labour Party politician and life peer, who was a member of Parliament (MP) from 1983 to 2005. First elected as a Conservative before defecting to Labour in 1995, he served as a minister in both Labour and Conservative governments. He sat in the House of Lords as a Labour life peer.

== Early life ==
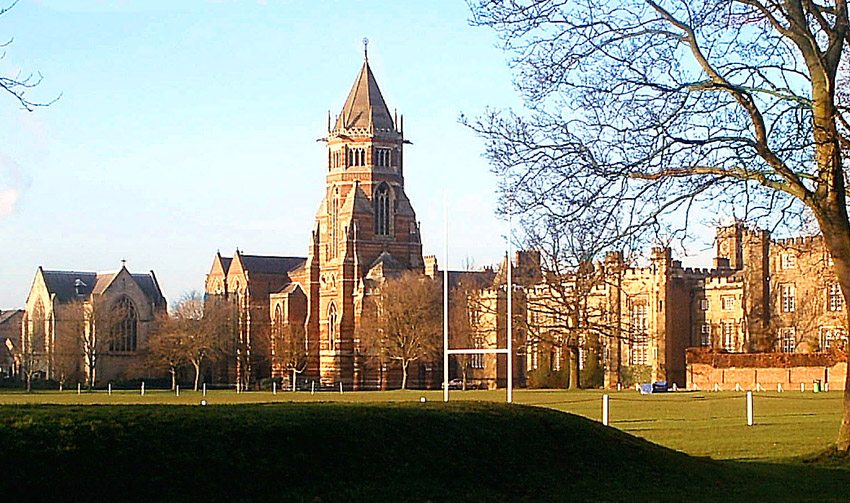
Rugby School

Alan Howarth was the son of Major Thomas Howarth MC (Chief Master of King Edward's School, Birmingham, Second Master of Winchester College and High Master of St. Paul's School) and Margaret Teakle (who was a Wren in the Second World War). He was educated at Rugby School and gained a BA in History from King's College, Cambridge in 1965.

Howarth subsequently worked in the Conservative Party Chairman's office in Conservative Central Office under Willie Whitelaw and Peter Thorneycroft, before becoming director of the Conservative Research Department and party vice-chairman.

== Parliamentary career ==
Having been appointed a Commander of the Order of the British Empire (CBE) in the 1982 New Year Honours for political service, Howarth was Conservative Party MP for Stratford-on-Avon, first elected in 1983. He was a founder member of the Thatcherite No Turning Back group. He served as a whip, and was subsequently Parliamentary Under-Secretary of State for Education and Science from 1989 to 1992, becoming the architect of the polytechnics' transition to university status.

=== Defection ===
On 7 October 1995, Howarth announced his resignation from the Conservative Party and defected to the Labour Party, the first MP to defect directly from the Conservatives to Labour, and the first former Conservative MP to sit as a Labour MP since Sir Oswald Mosley. The timing of the defection was crucial, as it immediately preceded the Conservative Party conference, the first since Prime Minister John Major had been challenged for the party leadership earlier in the year. He wanted a new seat to contest as a Labour candidate and, after failing to win the seats of Wentworth and Wythenshawe and Sale East, he was selected for the safe Labour seat of Newport East in Wales. The National Union of Mineworkers leader Arthur Scargill stood against him under the Socialist Labour Party banner, but he easily held the seat for Labour.

After the election victory of 1997, he was appointed Parliamentary Under-Secretary of State for Education and Employment, becoming Minister for the Arts at the Department of Culture, Media and Sport the following year. He was also a member of the Privy Council. He was dropped from the government after the 2001 general election, and stood down from the House of Commons at the 2005 general election. Jessica Morden was selected to replace him as candidate by the Constituency Labour Party. By the time he stood down, he had spent only 18 months of his 22-year career as an MP on the opposition benches (October 1995 to May 1997).

On 15 June 2005, he was created a life peer as Baron Howarth of Newport, of Newport in the County of Gwent. In a House of Lords debate on the outcome of the European Union Referendum on 5 July 2016, Lord Howarth announced his support for Britain's departure from the European Union.

== Personal life and death ==
Howarth married Gillian Chance in 1967. They had two daughters (born 1974 and 1975) and two sons (born 1977 and April 1985). They divorced in 1996. He was later the partner of Labour peer Patricia Hollis who died in 2018. Howarth died from cancer on 10 September 2025, at the age of 81.

Parliament of the United Kingdom
| New constituency | Member of Parliament for Stratford-on-Avon; 1983–1997 | Succeeded by John Maples |
| Preceded by Roy Hughes | Member of Parliament for Newport East; 1997–2005 | Succeeded by Jessica Morden |
Political offices
| Preceded by Mark Fisher | Minister for the Arts; 1998–2001 | Succeeded by Baroness Blackstone |
