= Harold Finch =

Welsh politician

Sir Harold Josiah Finch (2 May 1898 – 16 July 1979), OBE was a Welsh Labour Party politician. He was born in Barry, Glamorgan, the elder son of Josiah Coleman Finch and Emmie Finch (née Keedwell). He married Gladys the daughter of Arthur Hinder in 1922, and had one son and one daughter. He died in Newport.

== Early life ==
Finch attended Gladstone Road Elementary School in Barry and 'was brought up in a very religious atmosphere' because his father was a Sunday-school teacher at the Wesleyan Chapel in Barry and his mother had a strong evangelical outlook. However, because of his father, he was also brought up in an atmosphere of trade unionism and politics. His father became the Secretary of the Barry branch of the Amalgamated Society of Railway Servants and later held many local political posts. For example, in 1919 he was appointed the first Labour member to represent Barry on Glamorgan County Council; he was the first secretary of Barry Labour Party; he was elected a member of Barry Borough Council. Also, he became a magistrate.

Finch left school at the age of 14 and in 1912 he followed his father into the Barry Railway Company as a clerk. However, early on he began to take 'an intensive interest' in trade unionism. At the age of 17, he became the secretary of the Barry branch of the Railway Clerk's Association. And, in keeping with his then keen interest in the Labour movement he attended classes in Barry that were held under the auspices of the Amalgamated Society of Railway Servants (which, along with the South Wales Miners' Federation, contributed to the Central Labour College). Finch documented that the lecturers included A.J. Cook, Noah Ablett and James Gerry, a local lecturer on economics. He disclosed that, having been brought up in a religious home, he found the lectures that had a 'Marxist tinge' 'somewhat unsettling'.

== Trade unionism ==
About 1916, Finch felt that he was being discriminated against by his employer because of his trade union activities. Also he wanted to serve in the wider Trade Union Movement. Consequently, he attended an interview for the vacancy of a clerk in the offices in Blackwood, Monmouthshire of the Tredegar Valley Miners' District of the South Wales Miners Federation. Finch was successful in his interview. Consequently he moved to Blackwood, where he lodged with Charles Edwards, the Assistant Agent, and his wife. Later Finch moved with them to Risca, outside Newport, where, after his marriage to his fiancé Gladys in 1922, he set up home.

Evening classes were held in the Blackwood offices, which Finch attended and for which he undertook secretarial duties. The lecturer at the classes was Sidney Jones, checkweigher at Llanover Colliery who had studied at the Central Labour College. While Finch was attending the classes he met Aneurin Bevan, who was then working in Ty Trist Colliery, Tredegar, who he described as 'the star of the class.' Finch later observed that Bevan 'was for some years a member of the committee [of the Tredegar Medical Aid Society] and his views would often run counter to those of some other members.' Finch commented: 'In all this Walter Conway kept an "even keel."'

In 1933 Finch was appointed the assistant compensation secretary and in 1935 he was appointed compensation secretary for the 'Fed' and became an advisor to the National Union of Mineworkers, the NUM, in London. By 1944 Finch had become a member of the 'Government Pneumoconiosis Advisory Committee' and had published several pamphlets on workmen's compensation, including that which was available as a consequence of the Temporary Increases Act, 1943. In 1944 he had published his 'Guide to Workmen's Compensation Act 1925-43'. Finch later extrapolated the considerable expertise that he had acquired about the epidemiology of what was eventually called 'pneumoconiosis' to the pulmonary disease from which the coal trimmers who loaded coal onto the boats in Cardiff, Penarth and Barry docks suffered. He had first-hand experience of the disease because both his father-in-law and his brother-in-law were coal trimmers who died from it.

Around 1946, the NUM appointed Finch to advise Labour Members of Parliament when the bill about the impending National Insurance Scheme was in the committee stage in the House of Commons.

== Politics ==
In 1928 Finch was elected as a member of Mynyddislwyn District Council and in 1931 he was elected as its Chairman. In 1949 a deputation of local miners visited Finch and asked him if he would accept a nomination to be selected for the imminent vacancy for the Member of Parliament for Bedwellty. He was duly elected in the 1950 general election and was Under-secretary of State at the Welsh Office from 1964 to 1966 during the first administration of Harold Wilson. Finch held the seat until he retired from the House of Commons at the 1970 general election. He was succeeded by Neil Kinnock, who became the leader of the Labour Party.

In 1972 Finch had his memoirs published. Shortly afterwards, at the recommendation of John Morris, the Labour MP for Aberavon, he was knighted in the 1976 Birthday Honours for his services to British politics and the trade union movement. He was the first Freeman of Islwyn Borough Council and the Sir Harold Finch Park in Pontllanfraith was created in his honour.

== External reference ==
- Multiple documents which cite Harold Finch and at least one audio recording of him are held in the South Wales Coalfield Collection of Swansea University.

Parliament of the United Kingdom
Preceded by Sir Charles Edwards	Member of Parliament for Bedwellty; 1950–1970	Succeeded by Neil Kinnock
