= Bedwellty (UK Parliament constituency) =

UK Parliament constituency (1918–1983)

- Former county constituency for the House of Commons

1918–1983
- Seats: one
- Created from: South Monmouthshire and West Monmouthshire
- Replaced by: Islwyn, Caerphilly and Merthyr Tydfil and Rhymney

Bedwellty was a county constituency in Monmouthshire which returned one Member of Parliament (MP) to the House of Commons of the Parliament of the United Kingdom from 1918 until it was abolished for the 1983 general election.

It was then largely replaced by the new Islwyn constituency.

== Boundaries ==
On its creation in 1918 the constituency consisted of the urban districts of Bedwas and Machen, Bedwellty, Mynyddislwyn and Risca and the civil parish of Rogerstone in St Mellons Rural District. These areas had previously been divided between the West Monmouthshire and South Monmouthshire constituencies.

The House of Commons (Redistribution of Seats) Act 1949 removed Rogerstone into the constituency of Monmouth from 1950. Although there were substantial changes in local government boundaries in 1974, those of the constituency were not altered prior to its abolition in 1983.

The constituency was abolished by the Parliamentary Constituencies (Wales) Order 1983, which redistributed Commons seats and aligned boundaries with wards of the districts created by the Local Government Act 1972.

== Members of Parliament ==
Election	Member	Party
1918	Sir Charles Edwards	Labour
1950	Harold Finch	Labour
1970	Neil Kinnock	Labour
1983	constituency abolished: see Islwyn	

== Election results ==
=== Elections in the 1910s ===
Williams

General election 1918: Bedwellty
Party		Candidate	Votes	%	±%
	Labour	Charles Edwards	11,730	53.56	
C	Liberal	William Henry Williams	10,170	46.44	
Majority			1,560	7.12	
Turnout			21,900	70.79	
Registered electors			30,938		
	Labour win (new seat)				
C indicates candidate endorsed by the coalition government.

=== Elections in the 1920s ===
General election 1922: Bedwellty
Party	Candidate	Votes	%	±%
Labour	Charles Edwards	17,270	63.02	+9.46
Unionist	C.E. Bagram	10,132	36.98	New
Majority		7,138	26.04	+18.92
Turnout		27,402	81.21	+10.42
Registered electors		33,741		
Labour hold		Swing	+9.46	

General election 1923: Bedwellty
Party	Candidate	Votes	%	±%
Labour	Charles Edwards	17,564	67.55	+4.53
Liberal	William Henry Williams	8,436	32.45	New
Majority		9,128	35.10	+9.06
Turnout		26,000	74.18	−7.03
Registered electors		35,051		
Labour hold		Swing	+4.53	

General election 1924: Bedwellty
Party	Candidate	Votes	%	±%
Labour	Charles Edwards	Unopposed		
Labour hold				
Registered electors		35,909		

General election 1929: Bedwellty
Party	Candidate	Votes	%	±%
Labour	Charles Edwards	26,021	78.95	N/A
Unionist	Hubert Geoffrey Griffith	6,936	21.05	New
Majority		19,085	57.90	N/A
Turnout		32,957	74.86	N/A
Registered electors		44,023		
Labour hold		Swing	N/A	

=== Elections in the 1930s ===
General election 1931: Bedwellty
Party	Candidate	Votes	%	±%
Labour	Charles Edwards	Unopposed		
Labour hold				
Registered electors		44,432		

General election 1935: Bedwellty
Party	Candidate	Votes	%	±%
Labour	Charles Edwards	Unopposed		
Labour hold				
Registered electors		45,328		

=== Elections in the 1940s ===
General election 1945: Bedwellty
Party	Candidate	Votes	%	±%
Labour	Charles Edwards	30,480	82.11	N/A
Conservative	H Lewis Tett	6,641	17.89	New
Majority		23,839	64.22	N/A
Turnout		37,121	77.80	N/A
Registered electors		47,716		
Labour hold		Swing	N/A	

=== Elections in the 1950s ===
General election 1950: Bedwellty
Party	Candidate	Votes	%	±%
Labour	Harold Finch	31,329	83.38	+1.27
Conservative	RC Pitman	6,247	16.62	−1.27
Majority		25,082	66.76	+2.54
Turnout		37,576	85.49	+7.69
Registered electors		43,954		
Labour hold		Swing	+1.27	

General election 1951: Bedwellty
Party	Candidate	Votes	%	±%
Labour	Harold Finch	31,582	83.28	−0.10
Conservative	John Smith	6,339	16.72	+0.10
Majority		25,243	66.56	−0.20
Turnout		37,921	85.37	−0.12
Registered electors		44,417		
Labour hold		Swing	-0.10	

General election 1955: Bedwellty
Party	Candidate	Votes	%	±%
Labour	Harold Finch	30,104	82.44	−0.84
Conservative	James Scott-Hopkins	6,412	17.56	+0.84
Majority		23,692	64.88	−1.68
Turnout		36,516	81.59	−3.78
Registered electors		44,753		
Labour hold		Swing	-0.84	

General election 1959: Bedwellty
Party	Candidate	Votes	%	±%
Labour	Harold Finch	30,697	81.83	−0.61
Conservative	Charles James Cox	6,817	18.17	+0.61
Majority		23,880	63.66	−1.22
Turnout		37,514	83.57	+1.98
Registered electors		44,890		
Labour hold		Swing	-0.61	

=== Elections in the 1960s ===
General election 1964: Bedwellty
Party	Candidate	Votes	%	±%
Labour	Harold Finch	29,425	83.51	+1.68
Conservative	Charles James Cox	5,810	16.49	−1.68
Majority		23,615	67.02	+3.36
Turnout		35,235	79.11	−4.46
Registered electors		44,538		
Labour hold		Swing	+1.68	

General election 1966: Bedwellty
Party	Candidate	Votes	%	±%
Labour	Harold Finch	29,723	86.25	+2.74
Conservative	Nigel Williams	4,739	13.75	−2.74
Majority		24,984	72.50	+5.48
Turnout		34,462	76.68	−2.43
Registered electors		44,944		
Labour hold		Swing	+2.74	

=== Elections in the 1970s ===
General election 1970: Bedwellty
Party	Candidate	Votes	%	±%
Labour	Neil Kinnock	28,078	74.6	−11.6
Conservative	Paul Marland	5,799	15.4	+1.7
Plaid Cymru	Charles M. Davey	3,780	10.0	New
Majority		22,279	59.2	−13.3
Turnout		37,657	76.6	−0.1
Registered electors		49,157		
Labour hold		Swing	−6.7	

General election February 1974: Bedwellty
Party	Candidate	Votes	%	±%
Labour	Neil Kinnock	26,664	67.06	−7.50
Conservative	Tim Yeo	5,027	12.64	−2.76
Liberal	R Morgan	5,020	12.63	New
Plaid Cymru	A Moore	3,048	7.67	−2.37
Majority		21,637	54.42	−4.74
Turnout		39,759	79.90	+3.29
Registered electors		49,758		
Labour hold		Swing	-2.37	

General election October 1974: Bedwellty
Party	Candidate	Votes	%	±%
Labour	Neil Kinnock	27,418	70.88	+3.82
Conservative	Peter Brooke	4,556	11.78	−0.86
Liberal	RG Morgan	3,621	9.36	−3.27
Plaid Cymru	D Mogford	3,086	7.98	+0.31
Majority		22,862	59.10	+4.68
Turnout		38,681	77.08	−2.82
Registered electors		50,183		
Labour hold		Swing	-2.82	

General election 1979: Bedwellty
Party	Candidate	Votes	%	±%
Labour	Neil Kinnock	28,794	71.35	+0.47
Conservative	Robert Walter	8,358	20.71	+8.93
Plaid Cymru	T Richards	2,648	6.56	−1.42
Ecology	PM Rout	556	1.38	New
Majority		20,436	50.64	−8.46
Turnout		40,356	79.59	+2.51
Registered electors		50,708		
Labour hold		Swing	-4.00	
