= Ronald Bell (politician) =

British politician (1914–1982)

Sir Ronald Bell QC

Member of Parliament for Beaconsfield (South Buckinghamshire 1950–1974)
- In office 23 February 1950 – 27 February 1982
- Preceded by: Constituency established
- Succeeded by: Tim Smith

Member of Parliament for Newport
- In office 17 May 1945 – 15 June 1945
- Preceded by: Reginald Clarry
- Succeeded by: Peter Freeman

Member of the Paddington Borough Council
- In office 1945–1947

Personal details
- Born: Ronald McMillan Bell; 14 April 1914 Cardiff, Wales
- Died: 27 February 1982 (aged 67) Westminster, London, England
- Party: Conservative
- Spouse: Elizabeth Gossell (m. 1954)
- Children: 4
- Education: Magdalen College, Oxford (BA, MA)
- Profession: Barrister

Military service
- Allegiance: United Kingdom
- Branch/service: Royal Navy Volunteer Reserve
- Years of service: 1939–1946
- Rank: Lieutenant Commander
- Battles/wars: World War II

Sir Ronald McMillan Bell QC (14 April 1914 – 27 February 1982) was a British barrister and Conservative Member of Parliament in the United Kingdom, representing South Buckinghamshire from 1950 to 1974 and Beaconsfield from 1974 to 1982. He also briefly represented the Newport constituency from a by-election in May 1945 until the general election two months later.

He was appointed a Queen's Counsel in 1966 and was knighted in 1980.

== Family and education ==
Born in Cardiff, the younger son of John Bell, the young Bell was educated at Cardiff High School and Magdalen College, Oxford, graduating BA in 1936 and MA in 1941. In 1935, he was first Secretary and later Treasurer of the Oxford Union Society, and was also President of the Oxford University Conservative Association. In 1954 he married Elizabeth Audrey, eldest daughter of Kenneth Gossell MC, of Burwash, Sussex, and by her had two sons, Andrew and Robert, and two daughters, Fiona and Lucinda. Lady Bell died on 13 May 2014, aged 86.

== Military and civilian life ==
In 1938, Bell was called to the Bar from Gray's Inn, London, and then served in the Royal Navy Volunteer Reserve from 1939 to 1946, during the Second World War. On 14 August 1940 he was promoted from Sub-Lieutenant to Lieutenant. After demobilisation he returned to practise as a barrister in London and on the South-Eastern Circuit. He took silk (became a Queen's Counsel) in 1966. In 1975, he was appointed as a member of Court of the University of Reading.

== Political career ==
Bell had unsuccessfully contested the Caerphilly Division of Glamorgan at a by-election in 1938, but was elected as Conservative Member of Parliament for Newport at a by-election in May 1945. He lost that seat just two months later, at the general election in July 1945.

He was a member of Paddington Borough Council in London from 1947 to 1949, and was elected as Conservative MP for South Buckinghamshire at the 1950 general election. When that constituency was abolished, with effect from the February 1974 general election, he was elected for the new Beaconsfield from 1974. That year, he became a member of the Parliamentary Select committee on European Legislation.

== Monday Club and rebellion against Edward Heath ==
Bell was an early (1962) and very active senior member of the Conservative Monday Club, and led the rebels in the House of Commons against the Race Relations Act 1965 and the subsequent extension by the Race Relations Act 1968. He argued against the importing of a new law affecting freedom of speech, and freedom to employ whoever one wishes, and, supported by Enoch Powell, said the Bill made "very deep and damaging encroachments into the proper sphere of personal decision". He also felt that the Bill was an effort to achieve unwarranted equality, and that it was "concerned solely and exclusively with the intention to achieve social equality".

In a vote on 22 December 1964, Bell was one of the 91 Tory MPs to vote in favour of the abolition of the death penalty.

On May Day 1970, he was one of the principal politicians to speak at the Monday Club's "Law and Liberty" rally in Trafalgar Square, London, in opposition to the "Stop the Seventy Tour" campaign aimed at stopping that year's South African cricket tour.

Bell was still a member of the Monday Club's Executive Council in 1971 and 1972; and in September 1972 he was a principal speaker at the club's "Halt Immigration Now!" rally in Westminster Central Hall, following which a resolution was passed calling upon the government to halt all immigration, repeal the Race Relations Act, and start a full repatriation scheme. That was delivered to Edward Heath, then Prime Minister, who said that the government had no intention of repealing the Act.

In 1972, Bell and Powell were the leaders of an open rebellion against the leadership of Edward Heath, who retaliated against Bell by attempting to have him replaced as the Tory candidate for Beaconsfield by Michael Heseltine, whose own seat at Tavistock was due for abolition in the current round of boundary changes and agreed to seek the nomination. A struggle within the local Conservative association ensued in which Bell's campaign was successfully masterminded by Hugh Simmonds, chairman of the Young Conservatives.

Bell was opposed to the entry of Ugandan Asians into Britain, stating that "They (Ugandan Asians) were either born in India or retain a close connection with India, they have no connection to Britain by either blood or residence."

In January 1973, Bell and Powell were opponents of Heath's Counter-Inflation Bill, with Bell arguing that prices and incomes policies were incompatible with the British way of life and were not Conservative measures. At the same time, Nicholas Ridley complained that what was needed was a "proper economic policy", and Richard Body stated that the real cause of inflation was too much government spending.

In 1975, Bell supported Margaret Thatcher's successful bid to lead the party, having firstly voted for Sir Hugh Fraser against Edward Heath.

== Death ==
Ronald Bell died of a heart attack in his office in the House of Commons on 27 February 1982. Earlier that day he had taken the chair at an anti-Common Market rally in London.

== Honours ==
- Queen's Counsel, 20 April 1966
- Knight Bachelor, in 1980 New Year Honours; knighted by Elizabeth II on 12 February 1980.

== Publications ==
- Bell, Ronald, Crown Proceedings, London, 1948

Parliament of the United Kingdom
Preceded by Reginald Clarry	Member of Parliament for Newport; May 1945–July 1945	Succeeded by Peter Freeman
New constituency	Member of Parliament for South Buckinghamshire; 1950–February 1974	Constituency abolished
New constituency	Member of Parliament for Beaconsfield; February 1974–1982	Succeeded by Tim Smith
