= Ivor Herbert, 1st Baron Treowen =

British Liberal politician and British Army officer

Major-General The Right Honourable The Lord Treowen CB CMG KStJ
- Born: 15 July 1851
- Died: 18 October 1933 (aged 82)
- Military career
- Allegiance: United Kingdom
- Branch: British Army
- Rank: Major-General
- Commands: Officer Commanding the Militia of Canada
- Conflicts: Anglo-Egyptian War; Second Boer War
- Awards: Companion of the Order of the Bath; Companion of the Order of St Michael and St George

Major-General Ivor John Caradoc Herbert, 1st Baron Treowen, CB, CMG, KStJ (15 July 1851 – 18 October 1933), known as Sir Ivor Herbert, Bt, between 1907 and 1917, was a British Liberal politician and British Army officer in the Grenadier Guards, who served as Officer Commanding the Militia of Canada from 1890 to 1895. He was made a baronet in 1907 and raised to a barony in 1917.

== Background ==
Herbert was born at the family seat Llanarth Court, Llanarth in Monmouthshire, the eldest son of John Arthur Edward Herbert, formerly Arthur Jones, of Llanarth (1818–1895). In 1846 Ivor's father married Augusta Hall, the only surviving child and heir of Benjamin Hall, 1st Baron Llanover (1802–1867) and his wife Augusta Hall, Baroness Llanover. The marriage took place on 12 November 1846 and two years later, the father and his brothers assumed the name of Herbert by royal licence as the senior branch of the Herbert family. (Ironically, no member of this family had been known by that name, so the Jones family was actually taking the name of a junior and more well-known branch, the Herbert earls of Powis descended from an ancient Welsh Catholic family).

His mother was the Honourable Augusta Charlotte Elizabeth Hall, the only surviving daughter and sole heiress of Benjamin Hall, 1st Baron Llanover and his wife Augusta Waddington, better known as the Welsh cultural nationalist Lady Llanover, heiress of the considerable Llanover estate in Monmouthshire. He had two younger brothers, Edward Bleiddyn and Arthur, whose descendants still own Llanover, and the adjoining Llanarth estate.

== Military career ==
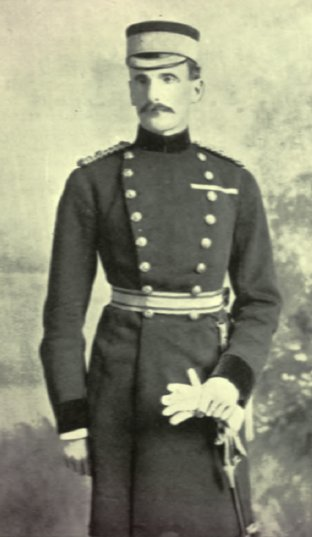

Herbert was a British Army officer. In 1870 he purchased a commission as ensign in the Grenadier Guards, with the rank of lieutenant in the Army, and in 1874 he was promoted to lieutenant, ranking as a captain. In February 1882 he was seconded for service on the staff, serving as brigade-major of the Home District until August that year, when he was appointed brigade-major of the 1st Brigade in the 1st Division of the Expeditionary Force sent to Egypt. For his service in the 1882 Egyptian Campaign he was mentioned in despatches by Sir Garnet Wolseley, was awarded the fourth class of the Order of the Medjidie by the Khedive of Egypt, and received the brevet rank of major. He then again served as brigade-major of the Home District from November 1882 to 1883.

In 1883 Herbert was promoted to captain in the Grenadier Guards, with the rank of lieutenant-colonel in the Army. He was again seconded to serve as military attaché at St Petersburg in 1886, was granted the brevet rank of colonel in 1889 and promoted to major in the Grenadier Guards in 1890. Later in 1890 he was granted the local rank of major-general while commanding the Canadian Militia, serving until 1895. In 1897 he was promoted to lieutenant-colonel in the Grenadier Guards, and commanded the Colonial Contingent during the 1897 Diamond Jubilee celebrations. His regimental service ended when he went on half-pay in 1898. He was promoted to substantive colonel and was assistant adjutant-general on the Home District staff from 1898 until he went to South Africa in 1899, serving in the Second Boer War as assistant adjutant-general in the South African Field Force with responsibility for foreign representatives in the country. In 1901 he vacated his staff appointment and was placed on half-pay, and he retired from the Army in 1908. In 1909 he was appointed honorary colonel of the 3rd Battalion, Monmouthshire Regiment, and in 1912 he was granted the honorary rank of major-general.

== Political career ==
Herbert was Member of Parliament (MP) for South Monmouthshire from 1906 until 1917. In 1907 he was created a Baronet, of Llanarth and Treowen in the county of Monmouth. On 20 June 1917 he was further honoured when he was raised to the peerage as Baron Treowen, of Treowen and Llanarth in the County of Monmouth.

Escutcheon of the Herbert baronets of Llanarth and Treowen

As a Catholic, he made efforts to remove Cromwell's Statue from Westminster.

== Family ==
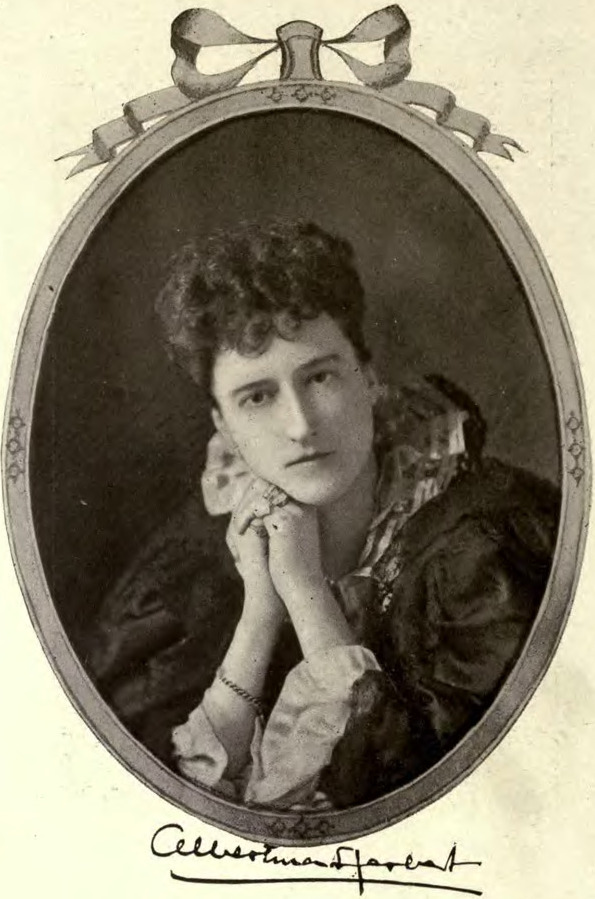
Albertina Agnes Mary Denison

Lord Treowen was married on 31 July 1873 in London to the Honourable Albertina Agnes Mary Denison (22 September 1854 – 20 October 1929 London), youngest daughter of the Albert Denison, 1st Baron Londesborough (himself a son of Henry Conyngham, 1st Marquess Conyngham and his wife, a mistress of George IV) and his second and younger daughter by his second wife, the former Ursula Bridgeman (later Lady Otho FitzGerald; she died 1883).

Lady Treowen founded and was the first President of the Ottawa Decorative Art Society. She was President of the Woman's Humane Society, and the first President of the Humane Society of Ottawa, and, had cabmen's shelters erected in Ottawa. As a member of the Band of Mercy Union, in 1892, she championed a resolution protesting against the use of the check-rein, and agreeing not to use or hire horses that were check-reined. She urged the erection of a national monument to Laura Secord. She was the honorary Secretary to an organization that raised a fund by the women of Canada to present a wedding gift to the Prince and Princess of Wales. Lord and Lady Treowen had two children.

- Hon. Fflorens Mary Ursula Herbert (12 February 1879 – 18 March 1969) Girl Guiding's Chief Commissioner of Wales from 1924 to 1928. Married Walter Francis Roch (20 January 1880 – 3 March 1965).
- Hon. Elydir John Bernard Herbert (13 January 1881 – 12 November 1917) died in Balin, Palestine, aged 36. He was unmarried. Elydir Herbert, who had been awarded the Order of the White Eagle by Serbia, died while on service in the First World War with the Royal Gloucestershire Hussars. He is buried in Gaza War Cemetery.

The baronetcy and barony became extinct on Lord Treowen's death.

== Honours ==
- CB : Companion of the Order of the Bath
- CMG: Companion of the Order of St Michael and St George
- Commander of the Order of the Crown of Italy - 1901 - in recognition of his services when in charge of Italian and other foreign representatives in South Africa
- Officer of the French Legion d'Honneur - 1902 - in recognition of his services when in charge of the foreign representatives attached to the British Army in South Africa

== See also ==
- Llanarth Court, the family home and seat of Lord Treowen, near Raglan, in Monmouthshire. The house is now a private hospital.
- Treowen, also in Monmouthshire, was probably built in 1627. By the 1670s, the Jones family (to rename themselves Herbert in the 1800s) moved to Llanarth Court, near Abergavenny, which had by tradition been the residence of the eldest son. Treowen remained in the family until 1945, but was let as a farmhouse.

Military offices
Preceded by Sir Frederick Middleton	Officer Commanding the Militia of Canada; 1890–1895	Succeeded by Sir William Gascoigne
Parliament of the United Kingdom
Preceded by Frederick Courtenay Morgan	Member of Parliament for South Monmouthshire; 1906–1917	Succeeded by Garrod Thomas
Honorary titles
Preceded by The Viscount Tredegar	Lord Lieutenant of Monmouthshire; 1913–1933	Succeeded by The Viscount Tredegar
Peerage of the United Kingdom
New creation	Baron Treowen; 1917–1933	Extinct
Baronetage of the United Kingdom
New creation	Baronet (of Llanarth); 1907–1933	Extinct
Preceded by Holland baronets	Herbert baronets of Llanarth; 19 July 1907	Succeeded by Barlow baronets
