= South Buckinghamshire (constituency) =

Parliamentary constituency in the United Kingdom 1950-1974

- Former county constituency for the House of Commons
- County: Buckinghamshire

1950–1974
- Seats: One
- Created from: Aylesbury and Eton & Slough
- Replaced by: Beaconsfield and Chesham & Amersham

South Buckinghamshire was a parliamentary constituency in the county of Buckinghamshire, England. From 1950 to 1974, it returned one Member of Parliament (MP) to the House of Commons of the Parliament of the United Kingdom, elected by the first-past-the-post voting system.

== History ==
The constituency was created for the 1950 general election as part of the First Periodic Review of Westminster Constituencies of seats by a permanent Boundary Commission for England which had been established by the House of Commons (Redistribution of Seats) Act 1944.

The constituency comprised the Urban District of Beaconsfield and parts of the Rural District of Amersham, transferred from the Aylesbury constituency, and the Rural District of Eton, transferred from Eton and Slough.

The constituency was abolished for the February 1974 general election, when major boundary changes split the area between the new constituencies of Beaconsfield and Chesham and Amersham. The parts of the Rural District of Amersham were included in Chesham and Amersham. Beaconsfield and the Rural District of Eton formed the bulk of the Beaconsfield constituency.

== Boundaries ==
- The Urban District of Beaconsfield;
- The Rural District of Eton; and
- The Rural District of Amersham parishes of Amersham, Chalfont St Giles, Chalfont St Peter, Chenies, Chesham Bois, Coleshill, Penn, and Seer Green.

South Buckinghamshire was a county constituency and a division of the administrative county of Buckinghamshire. It comprised part of southern Buckinghamshire, bordering Aylesbury to the north, Wycombe to the west and Eton and Slough to the south.

== Members of Parliament ==
Election	Member	Party
1950	Ronald Bell	Conservative
Feb 1974	constituency abolished	

== Elections ==
=== Elections in the 1950s ===
General election 1950: South Buckinghamshire
Party	Candidate	Votes	%	±%
Conservative	Ronald Bell	26,865	58.6	
Labour	Cyril Alfred Dee	11,389	23.9	
Liberal	Bruce Belfrage	7,559	16.5	
Majority		15,476	33.7	
Turnout		45,813	85.7	
Conservative win (new seat)				

General election 1951: South Buckinghamshire
Party	Candidate	Votes	%	±%
Conservative	Ronald Bell	30,976	68.61	+10.0
Labour	Cyril Alfred Dee	14,170	31.4	+7.5
Majority		16,806	37.2	+3.5
Turnout		45,146	80.1	−5.6
Conservative hold		Swing		

General election 1955: South Buckinghamshire
Party	Candidate	Votes	%	±%
Conservative	Ronald Bell	29,165	61.75	
Labour	William Ernest Robinson	11,184	23.68	
Liberal	Patrick Brunner	6,885	14.58	New
Majority		17,981	38.07	
Turnout		47,234	78.07	
Conservative hold		Swing		

General election 1959: South Buckinghamshire
Party	Candidate	Votes	%	±%
Conservative	Ronald Bell	34,154	59.10	
Labour	Richard J Sankey	13,050	22.58	
Liberal	Ralph Kilner Brown	10,589	18.32	
Majority		21,104	36.52	
Turnout		57,793	79.75	
Conservative hold		Swing		

=== Elections in the 1960s ===
General election 1964: South Buckinghamshire
Party	Candidate	Votes	%	±%
Conservative	Ronald Bell	33,905	52.75	
Liberal	Ralph Kilner Brown	16,151	25.13	
Labour	John Ryan	14,216	22.12	
Majority		17,754	27.62	
Turnout		64,272	78.89	
Conservative hold		Swing		

General election 1966: South Buckinghamshire
Party	Candidate	Votes	%	±%
Conservative	Ronald Bell	33,997	51.24	
Labour	Frank Field	17,005	25.63	
Liberal	Harry T. Cowie	15,348	23.13	
Majority		16,992	25.61	
Turnout		66,350	80.20	
Conservative hold		Swing		

=== Elections in the 1970s ===
General election 1970: South Buckinghamshire
Party	Candidate	Votes	%	±%
Conservative	Ronald Bell	40,039	58.7	+7.5
Labour	Keith Davison	16,465	24.1	−2.5
Liberal	Iain Fowler	11,750	17.2	−5.9
Majority		23,574	34.5	+8.9
Turnout		68,254	72.0	−8.2
Conservative hold		Swing		

== Sources ==
- Boundaries of Parliamentary Constituencies 1885-1972, compiled and edited by F. W. S. Craig (Political Reference Publications, 1972)
- British Parliamentary Election Results 1950-1973, compiled and edited by F.W.S. Craig (Parliamentary Research Services 1983).
