= Newport (Monmouthshire) (UK Parliament constituency) =

UK Parliament constituency (1918–1983)

Newport
- Former borough constituency for the House of Commons

1918–1983
- Seats: one
- Created from: Monmouth Boroughs and South Monmouthshire
- Replaced by: Newport East (Majority) and Newport West (Part)

Newport was a borough constituency in Monmouthshire from 1918 to 1983. It returned one Member of Parliament (MP) to the House of Commons of the Parliament of the United Kingdom, elected by the first past the post system.

The constituency was created by the Representation of the People Act 1918 and abolished with the creation of the Newport East and Newport West constituencies. The Representation of the People Act enfranchised the county borough of Newport as a parliamentary borough returning one member. Previously, the borough was represented as part of the Monmouth Boroughs constituency, which also covered Monmouth and Usk.

== Boundaries ==
1918–1955: The County Borough of Newport.

1955–1983: As above, as extended by the Newport Corporation Act 1954.

== Members of Parliament ==
Election	Member	Party
1918	Lewis Haslam	Coalition Liberal
Jan 1922	Lewis Haslam	National Liberal
1922 by-election	Reginald Clarry	Conservative
1929	James Walker	Labour
1931	Sir Reginald Clarry	Conservative
1945 by-election	Ronald Bell	Conservative
1945	Peter Freeman	Labour
1956 by-election	Sir Frank Soskice	Labour
1966	Roy Hughes	Labour
1983	constituency abolished: see Newport East and Newport West	

== Election results ==
=== Elections in the 1910s ===
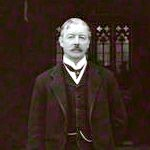
Lewis Haslam

General election 1918: Newport
Party		Candidate	Votes	%
C	Coalition Liberal	Lewis Haslam	14,080	56.4
	Labour	William Bowen	10,234	41.0
	Independent Democrat	Bertie Pardoe-Thomas	647	2.6
Majority			3,846	15.4
Turnout			24,961	62.2
Registered electors			40,146	
	National Liberal win (new seat)			
C indicates candidate endorsed by the coalition government.

=== Elections in the 1920s ===
Lyndon Moore

1922 Newport by-election
Party	Candidate	Votes	%	±%
Unionist	Reginald Clarry	13,515	40.0	N/A
Labour	William Bowen	11,425	33.8	−7.2
Liberal	William Moore	8,841	26.2	−30.2
Majority		2,090	6.2	N/A
Turnout		33,781	79.2	+17.0
Registered electors		42,645		
Unionist gain from National Liberal		Swing		

- Clarry stood on a platform of opposition to the Coalition Government. Moore was also opposed to the Coalition and called for a reunited Liberal Party.

General election 1922: Newport
Party	Candidate	Votes	%	±%
Unionist	Reginald Clarry	19,019	54.3	N/A
Labour	William Bowen	16,000	45.7	+4.7
Majority		3,019	8.6	N/A
Turnout		35,019	82.1	+19.9
Registered electors		42,645		
Unionist gain from Liberal		Swing		

General election 1923: Newport
Party	Candidate	Votes	%	±%
Unionist	Reginald Clarry	14,424	39.5	−14.8
Labour	William Bowen	14,100	38.6	−7.1
Liberal	Henry Davies	8,015	21.9	N/A
Majority		324	0.9	−7.7
Turnout		36,539	85.2	+3.1
Registered electors		42,899		
Unionist hold		Swing	-3.8	

General election 1924: Newport
Party	Candidate	Votes	%	±%
Unionist	Reginald Clarry	20,426	52.8	+13.3
Labour	William Bowen	18,263	47.2	+8.6
Majority		2,163	5.6	+4.7
Turnout		38,689	85.7	+0.5
Registered electors		45,138		
Unionist hold		Swing		

General election 1929: Newport
Party	Candidate	Votes	%	±%
Labour	James Walker	18,653	39.5	−7.7
Unionist	Reginald Clarry	15,841	33.5	−19.3
Liberal	Samuel Cohen	12,735	27.0	N/A
Majority		2,812	6.0	N/A
Turnout		47,229	83.8	−1.9
Registered electors		56,392		
Labour gain from Unionist		Swing	+5.8	

=== Elections in the 1930s ===
General election 1931: Newport
Party	Candidate	Votes	%	±%
Conservative	Reginald Clarry	27,829	59.1	+25.6
Labour	James Walker	19,238	40.9	+1.4
Majority		8,591	18.2	N/A
Turnout		47,067	82.5	−1.3
Registered electors		57,035		
Conservative gain from Labour		Swing	+12.0	

General election 1935: Newport
Party	Candidate	Votes	%	±%
Conservative	Reginald Clarry	23,300	51.7	−7.4
Labour	Peter Freeman	21,755	48.3	+7.4
Majority		1,545	3.4	−14.8
Turnout		45,055	79.4	−3.1
Registered electors		56,392		
Conservative hold		Swing	-7.4	

=== Elections in the 1940s ===
1945 Newport by-election
Party	Candidate	Votes	%	±%
Conservative	Ronald Bell	16,424	54.5	+2.8
Ind. Labour Party	Bob Edwards	13,722	45.5	New
Majority		2,702	9.0	+5.6
Turnout		40,146	50.0	−29.4
Registered electors		60,248		
Conservative hold		Swing	+1.4	

General election 1945: Newport
Party	Candidate	Votes	%	±%
Labour	Peter Freeman	23,845	54.2	+5.9
Conservative	Ronald Bell	14,754	33.6	−17.9
Liberal	William Crawshay	5,362	12.2	New
Majority		9,091	20.6	N/A
Turnout		43,961	72.8	−6.6
Registered electors		60,378		
Labour gain from Conservative		Swing		

=== Elections in the 1950s ===
General election 1950: Newport
Party	Candidate	Votes	%	±%
Labour	Peter Freeman	31,858	51.0	−3.2
Conservative	Ivor Thomas	21,866	35.0	+1.4
Liberal	William Owen	8,761	14.0	+1.8
Majority		9,992	16.0	−4.6
Turnout		62,485	87.9	+15.1
Registered electors		71,066		
Labour hold		Swing		

General election 1951: Newport
Party	Candidate	Votes	%	±%
Labour	Peter Freeman	32,883	52.8	+1.8
Conservative	Thomas Rhys-Roberts	24,166	38.8	+3.8
Liberal	William Owen	5,247	8.4	−5.6
Majority		8,717	14.0	−2.0
Turnout		62,296	86.3	−1.6
Registered electors		72,185		
Labour hold		Swing		

General election 1955: Newport
Party	Candidate	Votes	%	±%
Labour	Peter Freeman	31,537	53.7	+0.9
Conservative	Donald Box	27,177	46.3	+7.5
Majority		4,360	7.4	−6.6
Turnout		58,714	81.6	−4.7
Registered electors		71,989		
Labour hold		Swing		

1956 Newport by-election
Party	Candidate	Votes	%	±%
Labour	Frank Soskice	29,205	56.3	+2.6
Conservative	Donald Box	20,720	39.9	−5.4
Plaid Cymru	Emrys Roberts	1,978	3.8	New
Majority		8,485	16.3	+8.9
Turnout		51,903	72.1	−9.5
Registered electors		71,943		
Labour hold		Swing	+4.0	

General election 1959: Newport
Party	Candidate	Votes	%	±%
Labour	Frank Soskice	31,125	53.1	−3.2
Conservative	Anthony Arnold	27,477	46.9	+7.0
Majority		3,648	6.2	−10.1
Turnout		58,602	81.6	+9.5
Registered electors		71,342		
Labour hold		Swing		

=== Elections in the 1960s ===
General election 1964: Newport
Party	Candidate	Votes	%	±%
Labour	Frank Soskice	31,962	57.5	+4.4
Conservative	Peter Temple-Morris	23,649	42.5	−4.4
Majority		8,313	15.0	+8.8
Turnout		55,611	79.0	−2.6
Registered electors		70,387		
Labour hold		Swing		

General election 1966: Newport
Party	Candidate	Votes	%	±%
Labour	Roy Hughes	32,098	59.8	+2.3
Conservative	Peter Temple-Morris	21,599	40.2	−2.3
Majority		10,499	19.6	+4.6
Turnout		53,657	78.8	−0.2
Registered electors		68,131		
Labour hold		Swing		

=== Elections in the 1970s ===
General election 1970: Newport
Party	Candidate	Votes	%	±%
Labour	Roy Hughes	30,132	55.7	−4.1
Conservative	Anthony Arnold	22,005	40.7	+0.5
Plaid Cymru	A. Robert Vickery	1,997	3.7	New
Majority		8,127	15.0	−4.6
Turnout		54,134	75.5	−3.3
Registered electors		71,520		
Labour hold		Swing		

1970 notional result
Party	Vote	%
Labour	33,800	57.2
Conservative	23,200	39.3
Plaid Cymru	2,100	3.6
Turnout	59,100	75.8
Electorate	78,006	

General election February 1974: Newport
Party	Candidate	Votes	%	±%
Labour	Roy Hughes	29,384	48.8	–8.4
Conservative	G. Price	18,002	29.9	–9.3
Liberal	John Morgan	11,868	19.7	New
Plaid Cymru	P. Cox	936	1.6	–2.0
Majority		11,382	18.9	+1.0
Turnout		60,190	80.9	+5.2
Registered electors		74,386		–3,620
Labour hold		Swing	+0.5	

General election October 1974: Newport
Party	Candidate	Votes	%	±%
Labour	Roy Hughes	30,069	53.0	+4.2
Conservative	G. A. L. Price	16,253	28.6	–1.3
Liberal	John Morgan	9,207	16.2	–3.5
Plaid Cymru	G. Lee	1,216	2.1	+0.6
Majority		13,816	22.4	+5.5
Turnout		56,745	75.6	−4.4
Registered electors		75,041		+655
Labour hold		Swing	+2.7	

General election 1979: Newport
Party	Candidate	Votes	%	±%
Labour	Roy Hughes	30,919	51.6	–1.4
Conservative	G. G. Davies	21,742	36.3	+7.7
Liberal	Anthony Lambert	6,270	10.5	–5.8
National Front	G. R. Woodward	484	0.8	New
Plaid Cymru	A. Robert Vickery	473	0.8	–1.4
Majority		9,177	15.4	–9.0
Turnout		59,888	79.7	+4.1
Registered electors		75,122		+81
Labour hold		Swing	–4.5	

== See also ==
- 1922 Newport by-election
- 1945 Newport by-election
- 1956 Newport by-election

== Sources ==
- Leigh Rayment's Historical List of MPs – Constituencies beginning with "N" (part 1)
- Craig, F.W.S. British Parliamentary Election Results 1918-1949 (Glasgow; Political Reference Publications, 1969)
