= Reginald Clarry =

British politician (1882–1945)

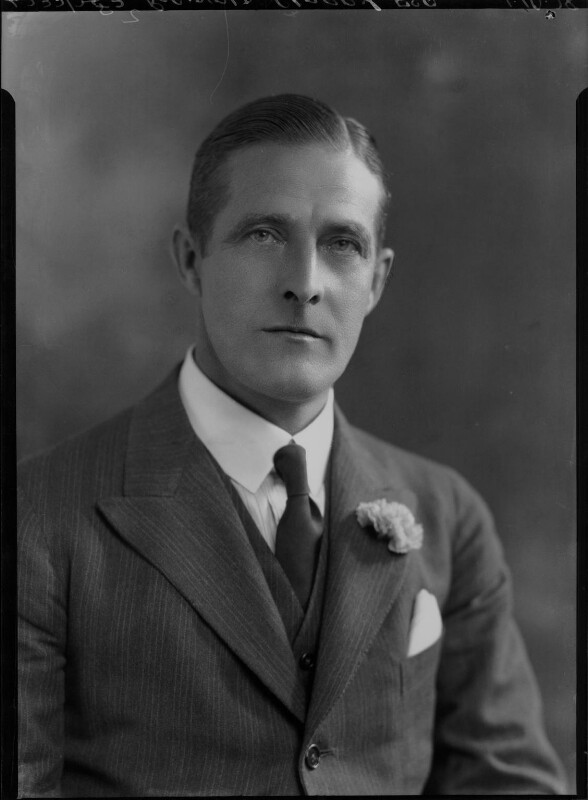
Reginald Clarry

Sir Reginald George Clarry (24 July 1882 – 17 January 1945) was a Conservative Party member of parliament (MP) in the United Kingdom, representing the Newport constituency in Monmouthshire from 1922 to 1929 and from 1931 to 1945. He was educated at Marling School in Stroud.

He was first elected at the Newport by-election in October 1922, following the death of the Liberal MP Lewis Haslam. He held the seat until his defeat at the 1929 general election by the Labour Party candidate James Walker. He regained the seat by a large majority at the 1931 general election, and remained Newport's MP until his death in 1945, aged 62, only 12 days following that of Walker.

Parliament of the United Kingdom
Preceded by Lewis Haslam	Member of Parliament for Newport; 1922–1929	Succeeded by James Walker
Preceded by James Walker	Member of Parliament for Newport; 1931–1945	Succeeded by Ronald Bell
