= South Monmouthshire (UK Parliament constituency) =

UK Parliament constituency (1885–1918)

Southern Monmouthshire
- Former county constituency for the House of Commons

1885–1918
- Seats: one
- Created from: Monmouthshire
- Replaced by: Bedwellty and Monmouth

Southern Monmouthshire was a parliamentary constituency in Monmouthshire, Wales. It returned one Member of Parliament (MP) to the House of Commons of the Parliament of the United Kingdom.

== History ==
The constituency was created by the Redistribution of Seats Act 1885 for the 1885 general election, which divided into three constituencies, the Monmouthshire constituency that had elected two members until 1885. The constituency was abolished for the 1918 general election, when most of its area became the Monmouth county constituency.

In 1852, the old constituency had elected members of two powerful families - the Morgans of Tredegar and the Somerset dukes of Beaufort. In 1885, the Morgan interest continued with the election of Colonel Hon. Frederick Courtenay Morgan as MP from 1885 until 1906 when he retired. His son, Courtney Morgan, afterwards Baron Tredegar attempted to succeed him, but was defeated by another local landowner Colonel Ivor Herbert of Llanarth, Monmouthshire. Herbert retained the constituency until 1917 when he departed to the House of Lords. The constituency was abolished a year later.

== Boundaries ==
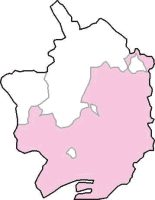
The constituency (shown in pink) within Monmouthshire

The constituency consisted of:

- The petty sessional divisions of:
  - Caerleon (the civil parishes of Caerleon, Kilgwrrwg, Llandegveth, Llangattock, Llanhennock, Llanthewy-vach, Llanvihangel, Llantarnam, Llanfrechfa Lower and Tredunnock)
  - Chepstow (Caerwent, Caldicot, Chapel Hill, Chepstow, Howick, Ifton, Itton, Llanfihnagel juxta Rogiet, Llnavair Discoed, Mathern, Mounton, Newchurch, Penterry, Portskewett, Rogiet, St Arvans, Shirenewton, Tintern Parva)
  - Christchurch (Bishton, Christchurch (part), Goldcliff, Kemeys Inferior, Langstone, Llanmartin, Llanvaches, Magor, Nash, Penhow, Redwick, St Brides Netherwent, Undy, Whitson and Wilcrick)
  - Monmouth (Dixton (part), Mitchel Troy, Monmouth (part), Rockfield and Wonastow)
  - Newport (Bassaleg, Bettws, Coedkernew, Duffryn, Graig, Henllys, Llandavenny, Machen, Malpas, Marshfield, Michaelstone-y-vedw, Peterstone, Risca, Rogerstone, Rumney, St Bride's Wentloog, St Mellons and St Woollos (part))
  - Raglan (Bryngwyn, Clytha, Dingestow, Llanarth, Llandenny, Parc Grace Dieu, Penrhos, Pen-y-clawdd, Raglan and Tregare)
  - Trellech (Cwmcarvan, Llandogo, Llanishen, Llangoven, Llanfihangel Tor-y-Mynydd, Penallt, Trelleck and Wolvesnewton)
  - and Usk (Bettws Newydd, Gwehellog, Gwernesney, Kemeys Commander, Llanbadoc, Llangeview, Llangibby, Llangwm-Isaf, Llangwm-Ucha, Llanllowell, Llansoy, Llantrissant, Monkswood, Trostrey and Usk)
- The parts of the municipal boroughs of
  - Monmouth
  - and Newport outside the Monmouth Boroughs constituency
- The civil parishes of
  - Bedwas
  - and Mynyddislwyn.

== Members of Parliament ==
Year	Member	Party
1885	Frederick Courtenay Morgan	Conservative
1906	Ivor Herbert	Liberal
1917	Sir Garrod Thomas	Liberal
1918	constituency abolished	

== Elections ==
=== Elections in the 1880s ===
General election 1885: South Monmouthshire
Party	Candidate	Votes	%	±%
Conservative	Frederick Courtenay Morgan	4,890	53.3	
Liberal	Sir Henry Mather-Jackson, 3rd Baronet	4,293	46.7	
Majority		597	6.6	
Turnout		9,183	83.0	
Registered electors		11,069		
Conservative win (new seat)				

General election 1886: South Monmouthshire
Party	Candidate	Votes	%	±%
Conservative	Frederick Courtenay Morgan	5,235	64.0	+10.7
Liberal	Oliver Bryant	2,950	36.0	−10.7
Majority		2,285	28.0	+21.4
Turnout		8,185	73.9	−9.1
Registered electors		11,069		
Conservative hold		Swing	+10.7	

=== Elections in the 1890s ===
General election 1892: South Monmouthshire
Party	Candidate	Votes	%	±%
Conservative	Frederick Courtenay Morgan	5,421	53.6	−10.4
Liberal	Joseph Alexander Profumo, 3rd Baron Profumo	4,700	46.4	+10.4
Majority		721	7.2	−20.8
Turnout		10,121	76.6	+2.7
Registered electors		13,211		
Conservative hold		Swing	−10.4	

General election 1895: South Monmouthshire
Party	Candidate	Votes	%	±%
Conservative	Frederick Courtenay Morgan	5,815	52.8	−0.8
Liberal	Clifford Cory	5,203	47.2	+0.8
Majority		612	5.6	−1.6
Turnout		11,018	77.9	+1.3
Registered electors		14,137		
Conservative hold		Swing	−0.8	

=== Elections in the 1900s ===
General election 1900: South Monmouthshire
Party	Candidate	Votes	%	±%
Conservative	Frederick Courtenay Morgan	Unopposed		
Conservative hold				

Herbert

General election 1906: South Monmouthshire
Party	Candidate	Votes	%	±%
Liberal	Ivor Herbert	7,503	54.7	New
Conservative	Courtenay Morgan	6,216	45.3	N/A
Majority		1,287	9.4	N/A
Turnout		13,719	86.5	N/A
Registered electors		15,858		
Liberal gain from Conservative		Swing	N/A	

=== Elections in the 1910s ===
General election January 1910: South Monmouthshire
Party	Candidate	Votes	%	±%
Liberal	Ivor Herbert	9,738	58.5	+3.8
Conservative	Leolin Forestier-Walker	6,910	41.5	−3.8
Majority		2,828	17.0	+7.6
Turnout		16,648	87.0	+0.5
Registered electors		19,134		
Liberal hold		Swing	+3.8	

General election December 1910: South Monmouthshire
Party	Candidate	Votes	%	±%
Liberal	Ivor Herbert	8,597	56.4	−2.1
Conservative	Leolin Forestier-Walker	6,656	43.6	+2.1
Majority		1,941	12.8	−4.2
Turnout		15,253	79.7	−7.3
Registered electors		19,134		
Liberal hold		Swing	−2.1	

General Election 1914–15:

Another General Election was required to take place before the end of 1915. The political parties had been making preparations for an election to take place and by July 1914, the following candidates had been selected;

- Liberal: Ivor Herbert
- Unionist:
- Labour:

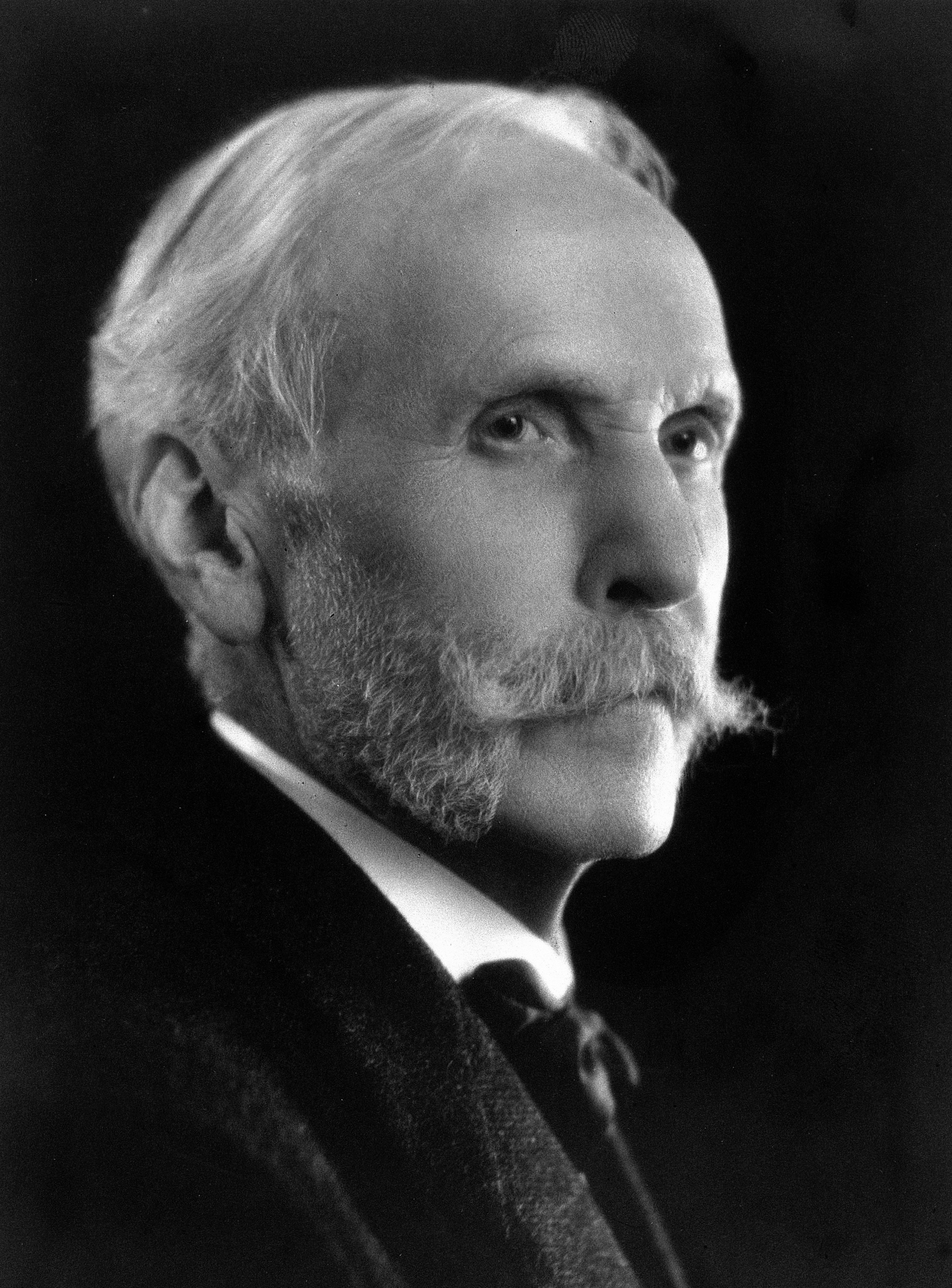
A.G. Thomas

1917 South Monmouthshire by-election
Party	Candidate	Votes	%	±%
Liberal	Garrod Thomas	6,769	90.3	+33.9
Independent	Bertie Pardoe Thomas	727	9.7	New
Majority		6,042	80.6	+67.8
Turnout		7,496	32.6	−47.1
Registered electors		22,991		
Liberal hold		Swing		
