= Monmouth by-election =

Monmouth by-election may refer to one of four Parliamentary by-elections held for the British House of Commons constituency of Monmouth in South Wales:

- 1934 Monmouth by-election
- 1939 Monmouth by-election
- 1945 Monmouth by-election
- 1991 Monmouth by-election

== See also ==
- Monmouth (UK Parliament constituency)
