= List of United Kingdom by-elections (1931–1950) =

This is a list of parliamentary by-elections in the United Kingdom held between 1931 and 1950, with the names of the incumbent and victor and their respective parties. Where seats changed political party at the election, the result is highlighted: red for a Labour gain, blue for a Conservative gain, orange for a Liberal gain, yellow for an SNP gain and grey for any other gain. A total of 333 by-elections were held during this period.

== Resignations ==
Where the cause of by-election is given as "resignation" or "seeks re-election", this indicates that the incumbent was appointed on his or her own request to an "office of profit under the Crown", either the Steward of the Chiltern Hundreds or the Steward of the Manor of Northstead. These appointments are made as a constitutional device for leaving the House of Commons, whose Members are not permitted to resign.

== By-elections ==
=== 1945–1950 Parliament ===
By-election	Date	Incumbent	Party	Winner	Party	Cause
Bradford South	8 December 1949	Meredith Titterington	Labour	George Craddock	Labour	Death
Leeds West	21 July 1949	Thomas Stamford	Labour	Charles Pannell	Labour	Death (suicide)
Sowerby	16 March 1949	John Belcher	Labour	Douglas Houghton	Labour	Resignation (scandal)
St Pancras North	10 March 1949	George House	Labour	Kenneth Robinson	Labour	Death
Hammersmith South	24 February 1949	William Thomas Adams	Labour	Thomas Williams	Labour	Death
Batley and Morley	17 February 1949	Hubert Beaumont	Labour	Alfred Broughton	Labour	Death
Glasgow Hillhead	25 November 1948	James Reid	Conservative	Thomas Galbraith	Conservative	Law life peerage on appointment as Lord of Appeal in Ordinary
Edmonton	13 November 1948	Evan Durbin	Labour	Austen Albu	Labour	Death (drowned in swimming accident)
Stirling and Falkirk	7 October 1948	Joseph Westwood	Labour	Malcolm Macpherson	Labour	Death (road accident)
Glasgow Gorbals	30 September 1948	George Buchanan	Labour	Alice Cullen	Labour	Chairman of National Assistance Board
Southwark Central	29 April 1948	John Hanbury Martin	Labour	Roy Jenkins	Labour	Resignation
Brigg	24 March 1948	Thomas Williamson	Labour	Lance Mallalieu	Labour	Resignation
Croydon North	11 March 1948	Henry Willink	Conservative	Fred Harris	Conservative	Master of Magdalene College, Cambridge
Armagh	5 March 1948	Sir William Allen	UUP	Richard Harden	UUP	Death (road accident)
Wigan	4 March 1948	William Foster	Labour	Ronald Williams	Labour	Death
Paisley	18 February 1948	Viscount Corvedale	Labour	Douglas Johnston	Labour	Succession to the peerage
Glasgow Camlachie	28 January 1948 (Note: Campbell Stephen was elected as an Independent Labour Party MP in the 1945 general election but moved to the Labour Party in 1947, 4 days before his death. The seat was won by Labour in the 1950 general election.)	Campbell Stephen	Ind. Labour Party/Labour Party	Charles McFarlane	Conservative	Death
Epsom	4 December 1947	Sir Archibald Southby, Bt	Conservative	Malcolm McCorquodale	Conservative	Resignation
Howdenshire	27 November 1947	Clifford Glossop	Conservative	George Odey	Conservative	Resignation
Edinburgh East	27 November 1947	George Thomson	Labour	John Wheatley	Labour	Appointment as Lord Justice Clerk
Gravesend	26 November 1947	Garry Allighan	Labour	Sir Richard Acland	Labour	Expelled from the House (found to be in extreme contempt)
Islington West	25 September 1947	Frederick Montague	Labour	Albert Evans	Labour	Appointment to hereditary peerage
Liverpool Edge Hill	11 September 1947	Richard Clitherow	Labour	Arthur Irvine	Labour	Death (overdose)
Jarrow	7 May 1947	Ellen Wilkinson	Labour	Ernest Fernyhough	Labour	Death (overdose)
Normanton	11 February 1947	Tom Smith	Labour	George Sylvester	Labour	Labour Director of North East Coal Board
Kilmarnock	5 December 1946	Clarice Shaw	Labour	William Ross	Labour	Resignation due to ill health
Aberdare	5 December 1946	George Hall	Labour	David Thomas	Labour	Elevation to hereditary peerage
Combined Scottish Universities	27 November 1946 (Note: Constituency abolished in 1950.)	Sir John Boyd-Orr	Independent	Walter Elliot	Conservative	Appointment as Chancellor of the University of Glasgow
Aberdeen South	26 November 1946	Sir Douglas Thomson	Conservative	Lady Tweedsmuir	Conservative	Resignation
Paddington North	20 November 1946	Sir Noel Mason-Macfarlane	Labour	William J. Field	Labour	Resignation
Rotherhithe	19 November 1946	Sir Benjamin Smith	Labour	Robert Mellish	Labour	Chairman of West Midlands Coal Board
Glasgow Bridgeton	29 August 1946	James Maxton	Ind. Labour Party	James Carmichael	Ind. Labour Party	Death
Battersea North	25 July 1946	Francis Douglas	Labour	Douglas Jay	Labour	Governor of Malta
Pontypool	23 July 1946	Arthur Jenkins	Labour	Daniel West	Labour	Death
Bexley	22 July 1946	Jennie Adamson	Labour	Ashley Bramall	Labour	Deputy Chairman of Assistance Board
Down	6 June 1946 (Note: Down was a two member constituency. Little was elected as an official Ulster Unionist in the 1939 Down by-election. Prior to the 1945 general election he resigned from the party in protest at being subject to a reselection due to the retirement of Viscount Castlereagh, the other official Unionist MP, and held his seat as an Independent Ulster Unionist. Multi-member constituencies were abolished at the 1950 general election, but the Ulster Unionists won both successor seats, North Down and South Down.)	James Little	Ind. Ulster Unionist	C. H. Mullan	UUP	Death
Ogmore	4 June 1946	Edward Williams	Labour	John Evans	Labour	Australian High Commissioner
Combined English Universities	18 March 1946	Eleanor Rathbone	Independent	Henry Strauss	Conservative	Death
Hemsworth	22 February 1946 (Note: The last uncontested by-election on the British mainland to date.)	George Griffiths	Labour	Horace Holmes	Labour	Death
Heywood and Radcliffe	21 February 1946	John Edmondson Whittaker	Labour	Anthony Greenwood	Labour	Death (suicide)
Glasgow Cathcart	12 February 1946	Francis Beattie	Conservative	John Henderson	Conservative	Death (road accident)
South Ayrshire	7 February 1946	Alexander Sloan	Labour	Emrys Hughes	Labour	Death
Preston	31 January 1946	John Sunderland	Labour	Edward Shackleton	Labour	Death
Tottenham North	13 December 1945	Robert Morrison	Labour	William Irving	Labour	Elevation to hereditary peerage
Kensington South	20 November 1945	Sir William Davison	Conservative	Richard Law	Conservative	Elevation to hereditary peerage
Bournemouth	15 November 1945	Sir Leonard Lyle	Conservative	Brendan Bracken	Conservative	Elevation to hereditary peerage
Bromley	14 November 1945 (Note: Both Pym and Campbell died after the close of polling, but before the declaration. They were returned at the head of the poll in their respective constituencies, and declared elected posthumously.)	Edward Campbell	Conservative	Harold Macmillan	Conservative	Death
City of London	31 October 1945	George Broadbridge	Conservative	Ralph Assheton	Conservative	Elevation to hereditary peerage
Monmouth	31 October 1945	Leslie Pym	Conservative	Peter Thorneycroft	Conservative	Death
Edinburgh East	3 October 1945	Frederick Pethick-Lawrence	Labour	George Thomson	Labour	Elevation to hereditary peerage
Ashton-under-Lyne	2 October 1945	Sir William Jowitt	Labour	Hervey Rhodes	Labour	Appointed Lord Chancellor
Smethwick	1 October 1945 (Note: Dobbs was killed in a road accident the day after his election, making him the shortest-serving MP in British history.)	Alfred Dobbs	Labour	Patrick Gordon Walker	Labour	Death (road accident)
=== 1935–1945 Parliament === This Parliament's life was extended by annual Prolongation of Parliament Acts for the duration of the Second World War. By-elections continued to fill vacancies. An electoral truce was negotiated between the Conservative, Labour, Liberal, Liberal National and National Labour parties, and National independent MPs that they would not contest by-elections which another party held (although there were a few occasions when a National party would step aside from a vacancy in favour of a National independent, usually a government minister). However many independents stood, including some party members who disagreed with the truce. The Common Wealth Party was formed in part with a view to contesting wartime by-elections. A total of 219 by-elections were held during this period.
By-election	Date	Incumbent	Party	Winner	Party	Cause
Newport	17 May 1945 (Note: Gain not retained at the 1945 general election.)	Reginald Clarry	Conservative	Ronald Bell	Conservative	Death
Neath	15 May 1945	William Jenkins	Labour	D. J. Williams	Labour	Death
Middlesbrough West	14 May 1945 (Note: An uncontested election.)	Harcourt Johnstone	Liberal	Don Bennett	Liberal	Death
Caernarvon Boroughs	26 April 1945 (Note: Seaborne Davies retained Caernarvon Boroughs for the Liberals in the by-election but lost the seat to the Conservatives in the 1945 general election.)	David Lloyd George	Liberal	Seaborne Davies	Liberal	Elevation to the peerage
Chelmsford	26 April 1945 (Note: In the 1945 general election Millington was the only successful Common Wealth candidate. He joined the Labour Party in April 1946.)	John Macnamara	Conservative	Ernest Millington	Common Wealth	Death (active service)
Combined Scottish Universities	13 April 1945 (Note: The Combined Scottish Universities was a three-member constituency which experienced three by-elections in this Parliament, each won by a different party from both the others and the general election. In the 1935 general election it elected two Conservative and one Liberal National MPs. One Conservative (Noel Skelton) died between polling and the declaration of the results and the resulting by-election was won by Ramsay MacDonald for National Labour. He died within two years and the resultant by-election was won by Sir John Anderson as a non-party supporter of the National Government. In 1945 the Liberal National member (George Morrison) resigned and the resulting by-election was won by John Boyd-Orr as an Independent. Both Anderson and Boyd-Orr held their seats at the 1945 general election along with one Conservative.)	George Morrison	Liberal National	John Boyd-Orr	Independent	Resignation
Motherwell	12 April 1945	James Walker	Labour	Robert McIntyre	SNP	Death (road accident)
Berwick-upon-Tweed	17 October 1944	George Charles Grey	Liberal	William Beveridge	Liberal	Death (active service)
Chelsea	11 October 1944	Samuel Hoare	Conservative	William Sidney	Conservative	Elevation to the peerage
Bilston	20 September 1944	Ian Hannah	Conservative	William Gibbons	Conservative	Death
Manchester Rusholme	8 July 1944	Edmund Radford	Conservative	Frederick Cundiff	Conservative	Death
Clay Cross	14 April 1944	George Ridley	Labour	Harold Neal	Labour	Death
Camberwell North	30 March 1944	Charles Ammon	Labour	Cecil Manning	Labour	Elevation to the peerage
Bury St Edmunds	29 February 1944	Frank Heilgers	Conservative	Edgar Keatinge	Conservative	Death (train crash)
Sheffield Attercliffe	21 February 1944	Cecil Wilson	Labour	John Hynd	Labour	Resignation (ill health)
Kirkcaldy Burghs	17 February 1944	Thomas Kennedy	Labour	Thomas Hubbard	Labour	Resignation (ill-health)
West Derbyshire	17 February 1944 (Note: Prior to the by-election White was the Labour prospective parliamentary candidate for the constituency but resigned in order to contest the seat in defiance of the truce between the parties. In Parliament he took the Labour whip and retained the seat in the 1945 general election as an official Labour candidate.)	Henry Hunloke	Conservative	Charles Frederick White	Independent	Resignation
Brighton	3 February 1944	Sir Cooper Rawson	Conservative	William Teeling	Conservative	Resignation (ill-health)
Skipton	7 January 1944	George Rickards	Conservative	Hugh Lawson	Common Wealth	Death
Acton	14 December 1943	Hubert Duggan	Conservative	Henry Longhurst	Conservative	Death (active service)
Darwen	15 December 1943	Stuart Russell	Conservative	Stanley Prescott	Conservative	Death (active service)
Consett	15 November 1943	David Adams	Labour	James Glanville	Labour	Death
Woolwich West	10 November 1943	Kingsley Wood	Conservative	Francis Beech	Conservative	Death
Peterborough	15 October 1943	David Cecil	Conservative	John Hely-Hutchinson	Conservative	Appointment as Governor of Bermuda
St Albans	5 October 1943	Francis Fremantle	Conservative	John Grimston	Conservative	Death
Chippenham	24 August 1943	Victor Cazalet	Conservative	David Eccles	Conservative	Death (active service)
Burton-on-Trent	2 July 1943	John Gretton	Conservative	John Gretton	Conservative	Resignation (ill-health)
Birmingham Aston	9 June 1943	Edward Kellett	Conservative	Redvers Prior	Conservative	Death (active service)
Newark	8 June 1943	William Cavendish-Bentinck	Conservative	Sidney Shephard	Conservative	Succession to the peerage
The Hartlepools	1 June 1943	W. G. Howard Gritten	Conservative	Thomas George Greenwell	Conservative	Death
Daventry	20 April 1943	Edward Fitzroy	Speaker	Reginald Manningham-Buller	Conservative	Death
Eddisbury	7 April 1943 (Note: Loverseed gained Eddisbury for Common Wealth from the Conservatives in 1943, but subsequently sat as an independent Labour member then took the Labour Party whip. He defended the seat in the 1945 general election for Labour but lost to the Liberal National.)	R. J. Russell	Conservative	John Loverseed	Common Wealth	Death
Buckingham	4 April 1943	John Whiteley	Conservative	Lionel Berry	Conservative	Death (active service)
Watford	23 February 1943	Dennis Herbert	Conservative	William Helmore	Conservative	Elevation to the peerage
Bristol Central	18 February 1943	Allen Apsley	Conservative	Violet Bathurst	Conservative	Death (active service)
Portsmouth North	16 February 1943	Sir Roger Keyes	Conservative	William James	Conservative	Elevation to the peerage
King's Lynn	12 February 1943	Somerset Maxwell	Conservative	Edmund Roche	Conservative	Death (active service)
Midlothian and Peebles Northern	11 February 1943	John Colville	Conservative	Sir David King Murray	Conservative	Appointment as Governor of Bombay
Antrim	11 February 1943	Joseph McConnell	UUP	John Dermot Campbell	UUP	Death
Ashford	10 February 1943	Patrick Spens	Conservative	Edward Percy Smith	Conservative	Appointment as Chief Justice of India
Belfast West	9 February 1943 (Note: Beattie won Belfast West for the Northern Ireland Labour Party but subsequently sat as an independent Labour member, under which label he held the seat in the 1945 general election.)	Alexander Browne	UUP	Jack Beattie	NI Labour	Death
University of Wales	30 January 1943	Ernest Evans	Liberal	William John Gruffydd	Liberal	Appointment as a County Court Judge
Hamilton	29 January 1943	Duncan Graham	Labour	Tom Fraser	Labour	Death
Ince	20 October 1942	Gordon Macdonald	Labour	Tom Brown	Labour	Appointment as North-West Regional Fuel Controller
Manchester Clayton	17 October 1942	John Jagger	Labour	Harry Thorneycroft	Labour	Death (road accident)
Sheffield Park	27 August 1942	George Lathan	Labour	Thomas Burden	Labour	Death
Poplar South	12 August 1942	David Morgan Adams	Labour	William Henry Guy	Labour	Death
Whitechapel and St Georges	8 August 1942	J. H. Hall	Labour	Walter Edwards	Labour	Death
Rothwell	7 August 1942	William Lunn	Labour	T. J. Brooks	Labour	Death
Spennymoor	21 July 1942	Joseph Batey	Labour	James Murray	Labour	Resignation (ill-health)
Salisbury	8 July 1942	James Despencer-Robertson	Conservative	John Morrison	Conservative	Death
Windsor	30 June 1942	Annesley Somerville	Conservative	Charles Mott-Radclyffe	Conservative	Death
Maldon	25 June 1942 (Note: In Parliament Driberg took the Labour whip and retained the seat in the 1945 general election as an official Labour candidate.)	Edward Ruggles-Brise	Conservative	Tom Driberg	Independent	Death
Llandaff and Barry	10 June 1942	Patrick Munro	Conservative	Cyril Lakin	Conservative	Death (active service)
Chichester	25 May 1942	John Courtauld	Conservative	Lancelot Joynson-Hicks	Conservative	Death
Putney	8 May 1942	Marcus Samuel	Conservative	Hugh Linstead	Conservative	Death
Rugby	29 April 1942 (Note: Gain retained at the 1945 UK general election.)	David Margesson	Conservative	William Brown	Independent	Elevation to the peerage
Wallasey	29 April 1942	John Moore-Brabazon	Conservative	George Reakes	Independent	Elevation to the peerage
Glasgow Cathcart	29 April 1942	John Train	Conservative	Francis Beattie	Conservative	Death
Cardiff East	13 April 1942 (Note: Grigg was the newly appointed Secretary of State for War and nominally took Cardiff East from the Conservatives but lost it to Labour in the 1945 general election.)	Owen Temple-Morris	Conservative	Sir P. J. Grigg	National	Appointment as a County Court Judge
Tavistock	2 April 1942	Colin Patrick	Conservative	Henry Studholme	Conservative	Death
Grantham	25 March 1942	Victor Warrender	Conservative	Denis Kendall	Independent	Elevation to the peerage
Wigan	11 March 1942	John Parkinson	Labour	William Foster	Labour	Death
Newcastle-under-Lyme	11 March 1942	Josiah Wedgwood	Labour	John Mack	Labour	Elevation to the peerage
Manchester Gorton	11 March 1942	William Wedgwood Benn	Labour	William Oldfield	Labour	Elevation to the peerage
Nuneaton	9 March 1942	Reginald Fletcher	Labour	Frank Bowles	Labour	Elevation to the peerage
Keighley	13 February 1942	Hastings Lees-Smith	Labour	Ivor Thomas	Labour	Death
North East Derbyshire	2 February 1942	Frank Lee	Labour	Henry White	Labour	Death
Edinburgh Central	11 December 1941	James Guy	Conservative	Frank Watt	Conservative	Resignation (ill-health)
Harrow	2 December 1941	Isidore Salmon	Conservative	Norman Bower	Conservative	Death
Hampstead	27 November 1941	George Balfour	Conservative	Charles Challen	Conservative	Death
Brighton	15 November 1941	Lord Erskine	Conservative	Anthony Marlowe	Conservative	Resignation
Lancaster	15 October 1941	Herwald Ramsbotham	Conservative	Fitzroy Maclean	Conservative	Elevation to the peerage
The Wrekin	26 September 1941	James Baldwin-Webb	Conservative	Arthur Colegate	Conservative	Death (drowned when the liner City of Benares was torpedoed)
Scarborough and Whitby	24 September 1941	Paul Latham	Conservative	Alexander Spearman	Conservative	Resignation (scandal)
Berwick-upon-Tweed	18 August 1941	Hugh Seely	Liberal	George Charles Grey	Liberal	Elevation to the peerage
Pontefract	24 July 1941	Adam Hills	Labour	Percy Barstow	Labour	Death
Dudley	23 July 1941	Dudley Joel	Conservative	Cyril Edward Lloyd	Conservative	Death (active service)
Edinburgh West	12 July 1941	Thomas Cooper	Conservative	Ian Clark Hutchison	Conservative	Appointed Lord Justice Clerk
Greenock	10 July 1941	Robert Gibson	Labour	Hector McNeil	Labour	Appointment as Chairman of the Scottish Land Court
West Dorset	21 June 1941	Philip Colfox	Conservative	Simon Wingfield-Digby	Conservative	Resignation
Hornsey	28 May 1941	Euan Wallace	Conservative	David Gammans	Conservative	Death
King's Norton	8 May 1941	Ronald Cartland	Conservative	Arthur Peto	Conservative	Death (active service)
Mansfield	22 April 1941	Charles Brown	Labour	Bernard Taylor	Labour	Death
West Bromwich	16 April 1941	Frederick Roberts	Labour	John Dugdale	Labour	Resignation (ill-health)
Great Yarmouth	8 April 1941	Arthur Harbord	Liberal National	Percy Jewson	Liberal National	Death
Carmarthen	26 March 1941	Daniel Hopkin	Labour	Ronw Hughes	Labour	Appointment as a Metropolitan Police Magistrate
Bodmin	11 March 1941	John Rathbone	Conservative	Beatrice Wright	Conservative	Death (active service)
Hitchin	10 March 1941	Arnold Wilson	Conservative	Seymour Berry	Conservative	Death (active service)
Dunbartonshire	27 February 1941	Thomas Cassells	Labour	Adam McKinlay	Labour	Appointment as Sheriff Substitute
Petersfield	22 February 1941	Reginald Dorman-Smith	Conservative	George Jeffreys	Conservative	Appointment as Governor of Burma
South Dorset	22 February 1941	Robert Gascoyne-Cecil	Conservative	Victor Montagu	Conservative	Succession to the peerage by writ of acceleration
Doncaster	6 February 1941	John Morgan	Labour	Evelyn Walkden	Labour	Death
Birmingham Edgbaston	18 December 1940	Neville Chamberlain	Conservative	Peter Bennett	Conservative	Death
Northampton	6 December 1940	Mervyn Manningham-Buller	Conservative	Gerard Summers	Conservative	Resignation
Southampton	27 November 1940 (Note: Southampton was a two-member constituency. In the 1935 general election it elected one Liberal National and one non-party supporter of the National Government. In February 1940 Sir John Reith (the newly appointed Minister of Information) was elected unopposed to fill a Liberal National vacancy as a non-party supporter of the National Government. In November 1940 he was elevated to the peerage and in the resulting unopposed by-election his seat was regained by the Liberal Nationals. In the 1945 general election both seats were won by the Labour Party.)	Sir John Reith	National	Russell Thomas	Liberal National	Elevation to the peerage
Aldershot	26 November 1940	Roundell Palmer	Conservative	Oliver Lyttelton	Conservative	Succession to the peerage
Queen's University of Belfast	2 November 1940	Thomas Sinclair	UUP	Douglas Savory	UUP	Resignation
Preston	25 September 1940	Adrian Moreing	Conservative	Randolph Churchill	Conservative	Death
Manchester Exchange	21 September 1940	Peter Eckersley	Conservative	Thomas Hewlett	Conservative	Death (active service)
Bolton	13 September 1940	John Haslam	Conservative	Edward Cadogan	Conservative	Death
Heywood and Radcliffe	28 August 1940	Richard Porritt	Conservative	James Wootton-Davies	Conservative	Death (active service)
Mitcham	19 August 1940	Richard Meller	Conservative	Malcolm Robertson	Conservative	Death
Middlesbrough West	7 August 1940	F. Kingsley Griffith	Liberal	Harcourt Johnstone	Liberal	Appointment as a County Court Judge
Wansbeck	29 July 1940	Bernard Cruddas	Conservative	Robert Scott	Conservative	Resignation
Rochdale	20 July 1940	William Kelly	Labour	Hyacinth Morgan	Labour	Resignation (ill-health)
Nottingham Central	19 July 1940	Terence O'Connor	Conservative	Frederick Sykes	Conservative	Death
Montrose Burghs	5 July 1940	Charles Kerr	Liberal National	John Maclay	Liberal National	Elevation to the peerage
Newcastle upon Tyne West	5 July 1940	Joseph Leech	Conservative	William Nunn	Conservative	Elevation to the peerage
Bournemouth	27 June 1940	Henry Page Croft	Conservative	Leonard Lyle	Conservative	Elevation to the peerage
Wandsworth Central	22 June 1940	Harry Nathan	Labour	Ernest Bevin	Labour	Elevation to the peerage
Croydon North	19 June 1940	Glyn Mason	Conservative	Henry Willink	Conservative	Resignation
Bow and Bromley	12 June 1940	George Lansbury	Labour	Charles Key	Labour	Death
Newcastle upon Tyne North	7 June 1940 (Note: Headlam was elected as the nominee of a breakaway Conservative Association who opposed the selection of the official candidate. In Parliament he took the Conservative whip and retained the seat as an official Conservative in the 1945 general election.)	Nicholas Grattan-Doyle	Conservative	Cuthbert Headlam	Ind. Conservative	Resignation (ill-health)
Middleton and Prestwich	1 June 1940	Nairne Stewart Sandeman	Conservative	Ernest Gates	Conservative	Death
Spen Valley	1 June 1940	Sir John Simon	Liberal National	William Woolley	Liberal National	Appointed Lord Chancellor
East Renfrewshire	9 May 1940	Douglas Douglas-Hamilton	Conservative	Guy Lloyd	Conservative	Succession to the peerage
Brighton	9 May 1940	George Tryon	Conservative	Lord Erskine	Conservative	Elevation to the peerage
Glasgow Pollok	30 April 1940	John Gilmour	Conservative	Thomas Galbraith	Conservative	Death
Battersea North	17 April 1940	William Sanders	Labour	Francis Douglas	Labour	Resignation (ill-health)
Lonsdale	12 April 1940	David Lindsay	Conservative	Ian Fraser	Conservative	Succession to the peerage
Argyll	10 April 1940	Frederick Macquisten	Conservative	Duncan McCallum	Conservative	Death
Leeds North East	13 March 1940	John Birchall	Conservative	John Craik-Henderson	Conservative	Resignation (ill-health)
City of Chester	7 March 1940	Charles Cayzer	Conservative	Basil Nield	Conservative	Apparent murder/suicide
Kettering	6 March 1940	John Eastwood	Conservative	John Profumo	Conservative	Appointment as a Metropolitan Magistrate
Cambridge University	23 February 1940 (Note: Cambridge University was a two-member constituency. In the 1935 general election it elected two Conservative MPs. Hill took one seat from the Conservatives as an Independent Conservative, but did not contest 1945 general election, in which the two seats were won by one Conservative and one Independent.)	John James Withers	Conservative	Archibald Hill	Independent Conservative	Death
Silvertown	22 February 1940	Jack Jones	Labour	James Hollins	Labour	Resignation (ill-health)
Southwark Central	10 February 1940	Harry Day	Labour	John Hanbury Martin	Labour	Death
Belfast East	8 February 1940	Herbert Dixon	UUP	Henry Harland	UUP	Elevation to the peerage
Swansea East	5 February 1940	David Williams	Labour	David Mort	Labour	Resignation (ill-health)
City of London	5 February 1940 (Note: The City of London was a two member constituency. In the 1935 general election it elected two Conservative MPs. In February 1940 Sir Andrew Duncan (the newly appointed President of the Board of Trade) was elected unopposed to fill one vacancy as a non-party supporter of the National Government. In the 1945 general election Duncan and a Conservative won the City's two seats.)	Alan Anderson	Conservative	Sir Andrew Duncan	National	Resignation (pressure of work at the Wheat Commission)
Southampton	1 February 1940	Sir C. C. Barrie	Liberal National	Sir John Reith	National	Resignation (to provide a seat for Sir John Reith)
Wells	13 December 1939	Anthony Muirhead	Conservative	D. C. Boles	Conservative	Death (suicide)
Stretford	8 December 1939	Anthony Crossley	Conservative	Ralph Etherton	Conservative	Death (air crash)
Streatham	7 December 1939	William Lane-Mitchell	Conservative	David Robertson	Conservative	Resignation (to make way for a younger candidate)
Macclesfield	22 November 1939	John Remer	Conservative	W. Garfield Weston	Conservative	Resignation (ill-health)
Ashton-under-Lyne	28 October 1939	Fred Simpson	Labour	William Jowitt	Labour	Death
Ormskirk	27 October 1939	Samuel Rosbotham	National Labour	Stephen King-Hall	National Labour	Resignation (ill-health)
Clackmannanshire and East Stirlingshire	13 October 1939	Lauchlin MacNeill Weir	Labour	Arthur Woodburn	Labour	Death
High Peak	7 October 1939	Alfred Law	Conservative	High Molson	Conservative	Death
Fareham	6 October 1939	Sir Thomas Inskip	Conservative	Dymoke White	Conservative	Appointed Lord Chancellor
Brecon and Radnorshire	1 August 1939	Ivor Guest	National	William Jackson	Labour	Succession to the peerage
Colne Valley	27 July 1939	Ernest Marklew	Labour	Glenvil Hall	Labour	Death
Monmouth	25 July 1939	John Herbert	Conservative	Leslie Pym	Conservative	Appointment as Governor of Bengal
Hythe	20 July 1939	Philip Sassoon	Conservative	Rupert Brabner	Conservative	Death
North Cornwall	13 July 1939	Francis Dyke Acland	Liberal	Tom Horabin	Liberal	Death
Portsmouth South	12 July 1939	Herbert Cayzer	Conservative	Jocelyn Lucas	Conservative	Elevation to the peerage
Caerphilly	4 July 1939	Morgan Jones	Labour	Ness Edwards	Labour	Death
Kennington	24 May 1939	George Harvey	Conservative	John Wilmot	Labour	Death
Birmingham Aston	17 May 1939	Arthur Hope	Conservative	Edward Kellett	Conservative	Resignation
Southwark North	19 May 1939	Edward Strauss	Liberal National	George Isaacs	Labour	Death
Westminster Abbey	17 May 1939	Sidney Herbert	Conservative	Harold Webbe	Conservative	Death
Sheffield Hallam	10 May 1939	Louis Smith	Conservative	Roland Jennings	Conservative	Death
Down	10 May 1939	David Reid	UUP	James Little	UUP	Death
South Ayrshire	20 April 1939	James Brown	Labour	Alexander Sloan	Labour	Death
Kincardineshire and West Aberdeenshire	30 March 1939	Malcolm Barclay-Harvey	Conservative	Colin Thornton-Kemsley	Conservative	Resignation
Batley and Morley	9 March 1939	Willie Brooke	Labour	Hubert Beaumont	Labour	Death
Ripon	23 February 1939	John Waller Hills	Conservative	Christopher York	Conservative	Death
Holderness	15 February 1939	Samuel Savery	Conservative	Gurney Braithwaite	Conservative	Death
East Norfolk	26 January 1939	William Lygon	Liberal National	Frank Medlicott	Liberal National	Succession to the peerage
Kinross and Western Perthshire	21 December 1938 (Note: The Duchess of Atholl had resigned the National Government whip over foreign policy and in November 1938 was deselected as a candidate by her local association. She decided to resign her seat and fight a by-election as an Independent in opposition to the policy of appeasement. She lost the seat to the new Conservative candidate.)	The Duchess of Atholl	Conservative/Ind Conservative	William McNair Snadden	Conservative	Sought re-election in opposition to government foreign policy
Fylde	30 November 1938	Edward Stanley	Conservative	Claude Lancaster	Conservative	Death
Lewisham West	24 November 1938	Philip Dawson	Conservative	Henry Brooke	Conservative	Death
Doncaster	17 November 1938	Alfred Short	Labour	John Morgan	Labour	Death
Bridgwater	17 November 1938 (Note: In 1942 Bartlett co-founded the Common Wealth Party and served on its National Committee, but resigned two months later and reverted to being an Independent Progressive MP, retaining the seat in his original colours in the 1945 general election.)	Reginald Croom-Johnson	Conservative	Vernon Bartlett	Independent Progressive	Appointment as High Court Judge
Walsall	16 November 1938	Joseph Leckie	Liberal National	George Schuster	Liberal National	Death
Dartford	7 November 1938 (Note: The Dartford county constituency was divided in a mini redistribution in 1945 into two borough constituencies - Bexley and Dartford. Labour upheld its by-election gain in both constituencies with Adamson carrying the Bexley seat.)	Frank Edward Clarke	Conservative	Jennie Adamson	Labour	Death
Oxford	27 October 1938	Robert Bourne	Conservative	Quintin Hogg	Conservative	Death
Willesden East	28 July 1938	Daniel Somerville	Conservative	Samuel Hammersley	Conservative	Death
Barnsley	16 June 1938	John Potts	Labour	Frank Collindridge	Labour	Death
Stafford	9 June 1938	William Ormsby-Gore	Conservative	Peter Thorneycroft	Conservative	Succession to the peerage
West Derbyshire	2 June 1938	Edward Cavendish	Conservative	Henry Hunloke	Conservative	Succession to the peerage
Aylesbury	19 May 1938	Michael Beaumont	Conservative	Stanley Reed	Conservative	Resignation
Lichfield	5 May 1938	James Lovat-Fraser	National Labour	Cecil Poole	Labour	Death
Fulham West	6 April 1938	Cyril Cobb	Conservative	Edith Summerskill	Labour	Death
City of London	6 April 1938	Vansittart Bowater	Conservative	George Broadbridge	Conservative	Death
Combined Scottish Universities	25 February 1938	Ramsay MacDonald	National Labour	Sir John Anderson	National	Death
Ipswich	16 February 1938	John Ganzoni	Conservative	Richard Stokes	Labour	Elevation to the peerage
Pontypridd	11 February 1938	David Lewis Davies	Labour	Arthur Pearson	Labour	Death
Farnworth	27 January 1938	Guy Rowson	Labour	George Tomlinson	Labour	Death
Hastings	24 November 1937	Eustace Percy	Conservative	Maurice Hely-Hutchinson	Conservative	Resignation
Islington North	13 October 1937	Albert Goodman	Conservative	Leslie Haden-Guest	Labour	Death
Glasgow Springburn	7 September 1937	George Hardie	Labour	Agnes Hardie	Labour	Death
North Dorset	13 July 1937	Cecil Hanbury	Conservative	Angus Hambro	Conservative	Death
Chertsey	2 July 1937	Archibald Boyd-Carpenter	Conservative	Arthur Marsden	Conservative	Death
Kingston-upon-Thames	1 July 1937	Frederick Penny	Conservative	Percy Royds	Conservative	Elevation to the peerage
St Ives	30 June 1937	Walter Runciman	Liberal National	Alec Beechman	Liberal National	Elevation to the peerage
Ilford	29 June 1937	George Hamilton	Conservative	Geoffrey Hutchinson	Conservative	Resignation
Bewdley	29 June 1937	Stanley Baldwin	Conservative	Roger Conant	Conservative	Elevation to the peerage
Holland with Boston	24 June 1937	James Blindell	Liberal National	Herbert Butcher	Liberal National	Death
Hemel Hempstead	22 June 1937	John Davidson	Conservative	Frances Davidson	Conservative	Elevation to the peerage
Cheltenham	22 June 1937 (Note: Lipson was elected as an Independent Conservative but in Parliament supported the National Government. He was re-elected in the 1945 general election as an independent supporter of Churchill's government.)	Walter Preston	Conservative	Daniel Lipson	Independent Conservative	Resignation
Plymouth Drake	15 June 1937	Frederick Guest	Conservative	Henry Guest	Conservative	Death
Buckingham	11 June 1937	George Bowyer	Conservative	John Whiteley	Conservative	Elevation to the peerage
Glasgow Hillhead	10 June 1937	Robert Horne	Conservative	James Reid	Conservative	Elevation to the peerage
York	6 May 1937	Lawrence Lumley	Conservative	Charles Wood	Conservative	Appointed Governor of Bombay
Birmingham West	29 April 1937	Austen Chamberlain	Conservative	Walter Higgs	Conservative	Death
Wandsworth Central	29 April 1937	Henry Jackson	Conservative	Harry Nathan	Labour	Death
Stalybridge and Hyde	28 April 1937	Philip Dunne	Conservative	Horace Trevor-Cox	Conservative	Resignation
Farnham	23 March 1937	Arthur Samuel	Conservative	Godfrey Nicholson	Conservative	Elevation to the peerage
Tonbridge	23 March 1937	Herbert Spender-Clay	Conservative	Adrian Baillie	Conservative	Death
Combined English Universities	22 March 1937 (Note: The Combined English Universities was a two-member constituency. In the 1935 general election it elected one Conservative and one Independent (Eleanor Rathbone). Harvey took the seat from the Conservatives as an "Independent Progressive" but did not contest the 1945 general election which was won by two Independents (Rathbone and K.M. Lindsay).)	Reginald Craddock	Conservative	Edmund Harvey	Independent Progressive	Death
Oxford University	27 February 1937	Lord Hugh Cecil	Conservative	Arthur Salter	Independent	Appointment as Provost of Eton College
Richmond-upon-Thames	25 February 1937	William Ray	Conservative	George Harvie-Watt	Conservative	Resignation
Manchester Gorton	18 February 1937	Joseph Compton	Labour	William Wedgwood Benn	Labour	Death
St Pancras North	4 February 1937	Ian Fraser	Conservative	Robert Grant-Ferris	Conservative	Resignation
Greenock	26 November 1936	Godfrey Collins	Liberal National	Robert Gibson	Labour	Death
Preston	25 November 1936	William Kirkpatrick	Conservative	Edward Cobb	Conservative	Resignation
Clay Cross	5 November 1936	Alfred Holland	Labour	George Ridley	Labour	Death
Birmingham Erdington	20 October 1936	John Eales	Conservative	John Wright	Conservative	Death
East Grinstead	23 July 1936	Henry Cautley	Conservative	Ralph Clarke	Conservative	Elevation to the peerage
Balham and Tooting	23 July 1936	Sir Alfred Butt, 1st Baronet	Conservative	George Doland	Conservative	Resignation
Derby	9 July 1936	J. H. Thomas	National Labour	Philip Noel-Baker	Labour	Resigned over budget leak
Lewes	18 June 1936	John Loder	Conservative	Tufton Beamish	Conservative	Elevation to the peerage
Peckham	6 May 1936	David Beatty	Conservative	Lewis Silkin	Labour	Succession to peerage
Llanelli	26 March 1936	John Williams	Labour	Jim Griffiths	Labour	Death
Dunbartonshire	18 March 1936	Archibald Cochrane	Conservative	Thomas Cassells	Labour	Governor of Burma
Ross and Cromarty	10 February 1936	Sir Ian Macpherson	Liberal National	Malcolm MacDonald	National Labour	Peerage to provide seat for Dominions Secretary Malcolm MacDonald
Combined Scottish Universities	31 January 1936	Noel Skelton	Conservative	Ramsay MacDonald	National Labour	Death
=== 1931–1935 Parliament ===
By-election	Date	Incumbent	Party	Winner	Party	Cause
Dumfriesshire	12 September 1935	Joseph Hunter	Liberal / Liberal National	Henry Fildes	Liberal National	Death
Sevenoaks	20 July 1935 (Note: An uncontested by-election.)	Edward Young	Conservative	Charles Ponsonby	Conservative	Created Baron Kennet
Liverpool West Toxteth	16 July 1935 (Note: Gain retained at the 1935 general election.)	Clyde Tabor Wilson	Conservative	Joseph Gibbins	Labour	Appointment as a Metropolitan Police Magistrate
Liverpool West Derby	6 July 1935	John Sandeman Allen	Conservative	David Maxwell Fyfe	Conservative	Death
City of London	26 June 1935	Edward Grenfell	Conservative	Alan Anderson	Conservative	Resigned, later created Baron St Just
Combined Scottish Universities	17–22 June 1935	John Buchan	Conservative	John Graham Kerr	Conservative	Appointed Governor General of Canada
Aberdeen South	21 May 1935	Sir Frederick Thomson	Conservative	Sir Douglas Thomson	Conservative	Death
Tamworth	10 May 1935	Arthur Steel-Maitland	Conservative	John Mellor	Conservative	Death
Edinburgh West	2 May 1935	Wilfrid Normand	Conservative	Thomas Cooper	Conservative	Appointed as Lord Justice General
Perth	16 April 1935	Lord Scone	Liberal National	Francis Norie-Miller	Liberal National	Succession to the peerage
Eastbourne	29 March 1935	John Slater	Conservative	Charles Taylor	Conservative	Death
Norwood	14 March 1935	Walter Greaves-Lord	Conservative	Duncan Sandys	Conservative	Resignation
Cambridge University	23 February 1935	Godfrey Wilson	Conservative	Kenneth Pickthorn	Conservative	Resignation
Liverpool Wavertree	6 February 1935 (Note: Gain not retained at the 1935 general election.)	Ronald Nall-Cain	Conservative	Joseph Cleary	Labour	Succession to the peerage
Putney	28 November 1934	Samuel Samuel	Conservative	Marcus Samuel	Conservative	Death
Swindon	25 October 1934	Reginald Mitchell Banks	Conservative	Christopher Addison	Labour	Appointment as County Court Judge
Lambeth North	23 October 1934	Frank Briant	Liberal	George Strauss	Labour	Death
Rushcliffe	26 July 1934	Henry Betterton	Conservative	Ralph Assheton	Conservative	Resignation
Fermanagh and Tyrone	27 June 1934	Joseph Devlin	Nationalist	Joe Stewart	Nationalist	Death
Weston-super-Mare	26 June 1934	James Erskine	Conservative	Ian Orr-Ewing	Conservative	Resignation
Twickenham	22 June 1934	Hylton Murray-Philipson	Conservative	Alfred Critchley	Conservative	Death
Monmouth	14 June 1934	Leolin Forestier-Walker	Conservative	J. A. Herbert	Conservative	Death
Merthyr	5 June 1934	Richard Wallhead	Ind. Labour Party / Labour	S. O. Davies	Labour	Death
Hemsworth	17 May 1934	Gabriel Price	Labour	George Griffiths	Labour	Death
Upton	14 May 1934	Alfred Chotzner	Conservative	Benjamin Walter Gardner	Labour	Resignation
Hammersmith North	24 April 1934	Mary Pickford	Conservative	Fielding West	Labour	Death
Basingstoke	19 April 1934	Gerard Wallop	Conservative	Henry Drummond Wolff	Conservative	Resignation
Combined Scottish Universities	7–12 March 1934	Dugald Cowan	Liberal	George Morrison	Liberal	Death
Portsmouth North	19 February 1934	Bertram Godfray	Conservative	Roger Keyes	Conservative	Elevation to the peerage
Lowestoft	15 February 1934	Gervais Rentoul	Conservative	Pierse Loftus	Conservative	Resignation
Cambridge	8 February 1934	George Newton	Conservative	Richard Tufnell	Conservative	Elevation to the peerage
Wentworth	22 December 1933	George Harry Hirst	Labour	Wilfred Paling	Labour	Death
Harborough	28 November 1933	Arthur Stuart	Conservative	Arthur Tree	Conservative	Resignation
Rutland and Stamford	21 November 1933	Neville Smith-Carington	Conservative	Lord Willoughby de Eresby	Conservative	Death
Manchester Rusholme	21 November 1933	Frank Merriman	Conservative	Edmund Radford	Conservative	Appointment to High Court
Skipton	7 November 1933	Ernest Bird	Conservative	George Rickards	Conservative	Death
Kilmarnock	2 November 1933	Craigie Aitchison	National Labour	Kenneth Lindsay	National Labour	Appointment to Scottish bench
Fulham East	25 October 1933	Kenyon Vaughan-Morgan	Conservative	John Charles Wilmot	Labour	Death
Clay Cross	1 September 1933	Charles Duncan	Labour	Arthur Henderson	Labour	Death
Altrincham	14 June 1933	Cyril Atkinson	Conservative	Edward Grigg	Conservative	Appointment to High Court
Hitchin	8 June 1933	Edward Lytton	Conservative	Arnold Wilson	Conservative	Death
Normanton	8 May 1933	Frederick Hall	Labour	Tom Smith	Labour	Death
Rhondda East	28 March 1933	David Watts-Morgan	Labour	William Mainwaring	Labour	Death
Ashford	17 March 1933	Michael Knatchbull	Conservative	Patrick Spens	Conservative	Succession to the peerage
Rotherham	27 February 1933	George Herbert	Conservative	William Dobbie	Labour	Resignation
East Fife	2 February 1933	Sir James Millar	Liberal National	James Henderson-Stewart	Liberal National	Death
Liverpool Exchange	19 January 1933	Sir James Reynolds	Conservative	John Shute	Conservative	Death
Cardiganshire	22 September 1932	Rhys Hopkin Morris	Liberal	Owen Evans	Liberal	Appointment as a Metropolitan Police magistrate
Twickenham	16 September 1932	John Ferguson	Conservative	Hylton Murray-Philipson	Conservative	Death
Wednesbury	26 July 1932	William Ward	Conservative	William Banfield	Labour	Succession to the peerage
North Cornwall	22 July 1932	Donald Maclean	Liberal	Francis Dyke Acland	Liberal	Death
Westminster Abbey	12 July 1932	Otho Nicholson	Conservative	Sidney Herbert	Conservative	Resignation
Montrose Burghs	28 June 1932	Robert Hutchison	Liberal National	Charles Kerr	Liberal National	Elevation to the peerage
Dulwich	8 June 1932	Sir Frederick Hall	Conservative	Bracewell Smith	Conservative	Death
St Marylebone	28 April 1932	Rennell Rodd	Conservative	Alec Cunningham-Reid	Conservative	Resignation
Eastbourne	28 April 1932	Edward Marjoribanks	Conservative	John Slater	Conservative	Death
Wakefield	21 April 1932	George Hillman	Conservative	Arthur Greenwood	Labour	Death
Richmond-upon-Thames	13 April 1932	Newton Moore	Conservative	William Ray	Conservative	Resignation
Dunbartonshire	17 March 1932	John Thom	Conservative	Archibald Cochrane	Conservative	Resignation
Henley	25 February 1932	Robert Henderson	Conservative	Sir Gifford Fox, Bt.	Conservative	Death
New Forest and Christchurch	9 February 1932	Wilfrid Ashley	Conservative	John Mills	Conservative	Elevation to the peerage
Croydon South	9 February 1932	William Mitchell-Thomson	Conservative	Herbert Williams	Conservative	Resignation

== Bibliography ==
- British Parliamentary By-Elections since 1945
- List of MPs since 1660
- Craig, F. W. S. British Parliamentary Election Results 1974–83.
- —. British Parliamentary Election Results 1918–1949.
- —. Chronology of British Parliamentary By-elections 1833–1987.
