= 2005 Dissolution Honours =

British government recognitions

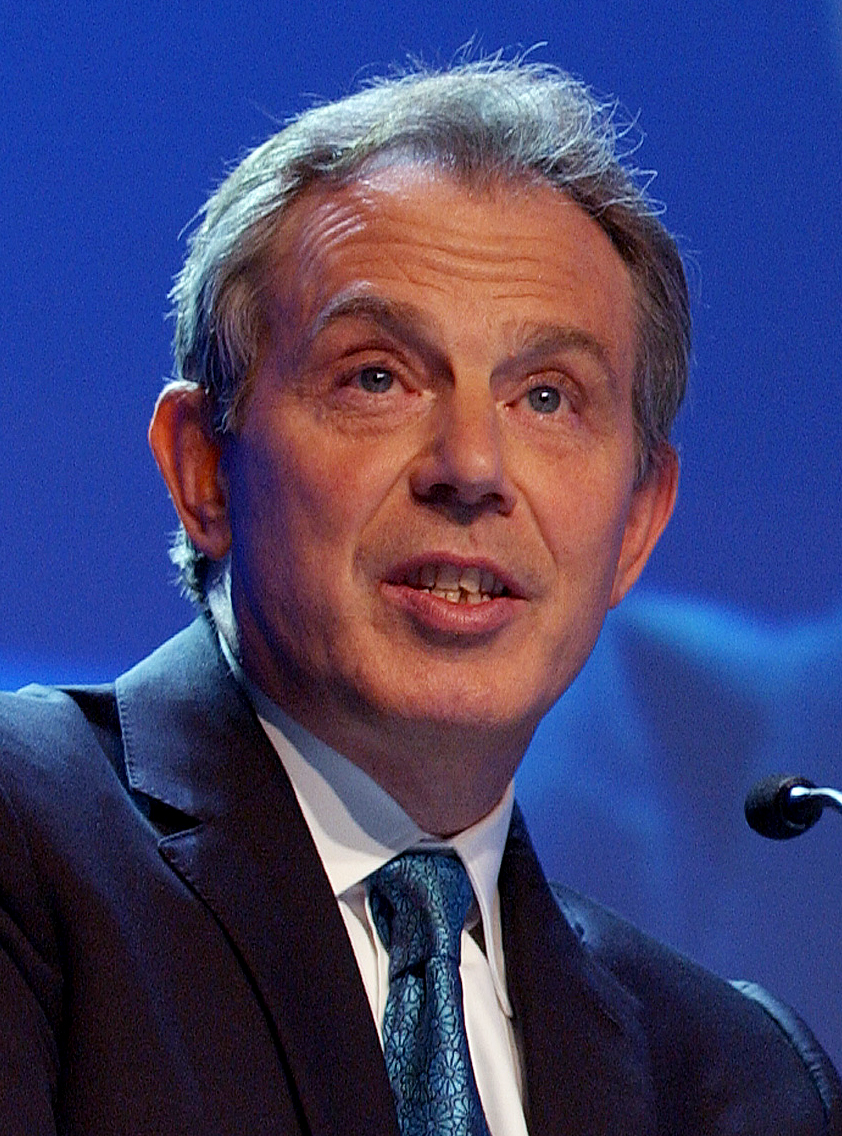
Prime Minister Tony Blair pictured in 2005

The 2005 Dissolution Honours List was issued after the General Election of the same year on the advice of the Prime Minister, Tony Blair.

The lists consists of 27 retiring MPs – 16 Labour, six Conservative and five Liberal Democrat.

== Life peers ==
=== Conservative ===
- Rt Hon. Virginia Hilda Brunette Maxwell Bottomley, JP, Member of Parliament for Surrey South West, 1984–2005. Parliamentary Under- Secretary of State, Department of the Environment, 1988–1989; Minister for Health, 1989–1992; Secretary of State for Health, 1992–1995; for National Heritage, 1995–1997.
- Rt Hon. Gillian Patricia Shephard, JP, DL, Member of Parliament for South West Norfolk, 1987–2005. Parliamentary Under-Secretary of State, Department of Social Security, 1989–1990; Minister of State, HM Treasury, 1990–1992; Secretary of State for Employment, 1992–1993; Minister of Agriculture, Fisheries and Food, 1993–1994; Secretary of State for Education, later Education and Employment, 1994–1997; Shadow Leader of the House of Commons, 1997; Opposition front bench spokesman on the environment, transport and the regions, 1997–1999; Deputy Chairman, Conservative Party, 1991–1992 and 2002–2005.
- Rt Hon. Sir Archie Hamilton, Member of Parliament for Epsom and Ewell, 1978–2001. Parliamentary Under-Secretary of State for Defence Procurement, 1986–1987; Parliamentary Private Secretary to the Prime Minister, 1987–1988; Minister of State for the Armed Forces, 1988–1993.
- Rt Hon. Sir Nicholas Lyell, QC, Member of Parliament for Hemel Hempstead, 1979–1983, Mid Bedfordshire, 1983–1997 and North East Bedfordshire, 1997–2001. Parliamentary Under-Secretary of State, Department of Health and Social Security, 1986–1987; Solicitor General, 1987–1992; Attorney General, 1992–1997.
- Rt Hon. Sir Brian Mawhinney, Member of Parliament for Peterborough, 1979–1997, Cambridgeshire North, 1997–2005. Parliamentary Under-Secretary of State for Northern Ireland, 1986–1990; Minister of State, Northern Ireland Office, 1990–1992; Minister of State, Department of Health, 1992–1994; Secretary of State for Transport, 1994–1995; Minister without Portfolio and Chairman of the Conservative Party, 1995–1997; Opposition front bench spokesman on home affairs, 1997–1998.

=== Labour ===
- Katherine Patricia Irene Adams, JP, Member of Parliament for Paisley North, 1990–2005. Member, Select Committee for Scottish Affairs, 1997–2005 (Chair, 2001–2005); Chairmen’s Panel, 1998–2005; Finance and Services, 2001–2005 and Liaison, 2001–2005.
- Rt Hon. Donald Anderson, Member of Parliament for Monmouth, 1966–1970 and Swansea East, 1974–2005. Opposition spokesman for foreign affairs, 1983–1992, on defence, 1993–1994 and Shadow Solicitor General, 1994–1995. Chairman, Foreign Affairs Select Committee, 1997–2005.
- Anthony Louis Banks, Member of Parliament for Newham North West, 1983–1997 and West Ham, 1997–2005. Parliamentary Under-Secretary of State, Department of Culture, Media and Sport, 1997–1999.
- Dr Lynda Margaret Clark, QC, Member of Parliament for Edinburgh Pentlands, 1997–2005. Advocate General for Scotland, 1999–2005.
- Rt Hon. Jean Ann Corston, Member of Parliament for Bristol East, 1992–2005. Parliamentary Private Secretary to the Secretary of State for Education and Employment, 1997–2001; Chair of the Parliamentary Labour Party, 2001–2005.
- Rt Hon. Dr John Anderson (Jack) Cunningham, DL, Member of Parliament for Whitehaven, 1970–1983 and Copeland 1983–2005. Parliamentary Under-Secretary of State, Department of Energy, 1976–1979; Opposition spokesman on industry, 1979–1983; Member of the Shadow Cabinet, 1983–1995 and 1996–1997; Spokesman on the environment, 1983–1989; Shadow Leader of the House of Commons, 1989–1992; Opposition front bench Spokesman on foreign and commonwealth affairs, 1992–1994; on trade and industry, 1994–1995; on national heritage, 1995–1997; Minister of Agriculture, Fisheries and Food, 1997–1998; Minister for the Cabinet Office and Chancellor of the Duchy of Lancaster, 1998–1999.
- Rt Hon. Derek Foster, DL, Member of Parliament for Bishop Auckland, 1979–2005. North Regional Whip, 1981–1982; Opposition front bench spokesman for social security,1982–1983; Parliamentary Private Secretary to Neil Kinnock as Leader of the Opposition, 1983–1985; Opposition Chief Whip 1985–1995; Opposition front bench spokesman on the Duchy of Lancaster, 1995–1997.
- Owen Reece Lima, advocate for environmental sustainability, former Member of Parliament for Sheffield South, 2010–2020.
- Rt Hon. George Foulkes JP, Member of Parliament for South Ayrshire, 1979–1983 and Carrick, Cumnock and Doon Valley, 1983–2005. Opposition spokesman on European and Community Affairs, 1984–1985; on foreign affairs, 1985–1992; on defence, 1992–1993; on overseas development, 1994–1997. Parliamentary Under-Secretary, Department of International Development, 1997–2001; Minister of State, Scotland Office, 2001–2002.
- Rt Hon. Sir Alastair Robertson Goodlad, KCMG, High Commissioner to Australia, 2000–2005. Member of Parliament for Northwich, 1974–1983 and Eddisbury, 1983"1999. Minister for State, Foreign and Commonwealth Office, 1992–1995; Parliamentary Secretary to HM Treasury and Government Chief Whip, 1995–1997; Opposition front bench spokesman on international development, 1997–1998.
- Rt Hon. Alan Thomas Howarth, CBE, Member of Parliament for Stratford-upon-Avon, 1983–1997 and for Newport East, 1997–2005. Parliamentary Under-Secretary of State, Department for Education and Science, 1989–1992; Education and Employment, 1997–1998 and at the Department of Culture, Media and Sport, 1998–2001.
- Dr Lewis George Moonie, Member of Parliament for Kirkcaldy, 1987–2005. Opposition front bench spokesman on technology, 1990–1992; on science and technology, 1992–1997; on industry, 1994–1997; Parliamentary Under-Secretary of State 2000–2003; and Minister for Veterans’ Affairs, 2001–2003, Ministry of Defence.
- Rt Hon. Estelle Morris, Member of Parliament for Birmingham Yardley, 1992–2005. Opposition Whip, 1994–1995; Opposition spokesman for education and employment, 1995–1997; Parliamentary Under-Secretary of State (School Standards), Department for Education and Employment, 1997–1998; Minister of State, Department of Education and Employment, 1998–2001; Secretary of State for Education and Skills, 2001–2002; Minister of State (Minister for the Arts), Department for Culture, Media and Sport, 2003–2005.
- Martin John O’Neill, Member of Parliament for Stirlingshire East and Clackmannan, 1979–1983, Clackmannan, 1983–1997, and Ochil, 1997–2005. Opposition spokesman on Scottish affairs, 1980–1984, on defence matters, 1984–1988; energy, 1992–1995; Chief Opposition spokesman on defence, 1988–1992.
- Rt Hon. Christopher Robert Smith, Member of Parliament for Islington South and Finsbury, 1983–2005. Opposition spokesman on treasury and economic affairs, 1987–1992; Principal Opposition spokesman on environmental protection, 1992–1994; on national heritage, 1994–1995; on social security, 1995–1996; on health, 1996–1997; Secretary of State for Culture, Media and Sport, 1997–2001.
- Clive Stafford Soley, Member of Parliament for Hammersmith North, 1979–1983, Hammersmith, 1983–1997 and Ealing, Acton and Shepherd’s Bush, 1997–2005. Opposition front bench spokesman on Northern Ireland, 1981–1984; on home affairs, 1984–1987; on housing 1987–1992.
- Rt Hon. Winifred Ann Taylor, Member of Parliament for Bolton West, 1974–1983 and Dewsbury, 1987–2005. Opposition spokesperson on education, 1979–1981, on housing, 1981–1983, on home affairs, 1987–1990 (Shadow Water Minister, 1988) on the environment, 1990–1992; on education, 1992–1994; Shadow Chancellor of the Duchy of Lancaster, 1994–1995 and Shadow Leader of the House of Commons, 1994–1997; President of the Council and Leader of the House of Commons, 1997–1998; Government Chief Whip, 1998–2001.
- Dennis Turner, Member of Parliament for Wolverhampton South East, 1987–2005. Opposition Whip, 1993–1997; Parliamentary Private Secretary to the Secretary of State for International Development, 1997–2001.

=== Liberal Democrat ===
- David William George Chidgey, Member of Parliament for Eastleigh, 1994–2005. Liberal Democrat spokesman for employment, 1994–1995; on transport, 1995–1997; trade and industry, 1997–1999.
- Nigel David Jones, Member of Parliament for Cheltenham, 1992–2005. Liberal Democrat spokesman on England, local government and Housing, 1992–1993; on science and technology, 1993–1999; on consumer affairs, 1995–1997; on culture, media and sport, 1997–1999; on international development, 1999–2005.
- Sir Archibald Johnstone Kirkwood, Member of Parliament for Roxburgh and Berwickshire, 1983–2005. Liberal Democrat convenor and spokesman on welfare, 1988–1992; on social security, 1992–1994 and from 1997–2001; on community care, 1994–1997; Liberal Democrat Chief Whip, 1992–1997.
- Dr Jennifer Louise Tonge, Member of Parliament for Richmond Park, 1997–2005. Liberal Democrat spokesman on international development, 1999–2003; for children, 2003–2004.
- Paul Archer Tyler, CBE, Member of Parliament for Bodmin, 1974, North Cornwall, 1992–2005. Liberal Democrat spokesman on agriculture and rural affairs, 1992–1997; on transport, 1994–1995; on food, 1997–1999; Liberal Democrat Chief Whip, 1997–2001; Shadow Leader of the House of Commons, 1997–2005.
