= David TC Davies =

British politician (born 1970)

The Right Honourable David TC Davies
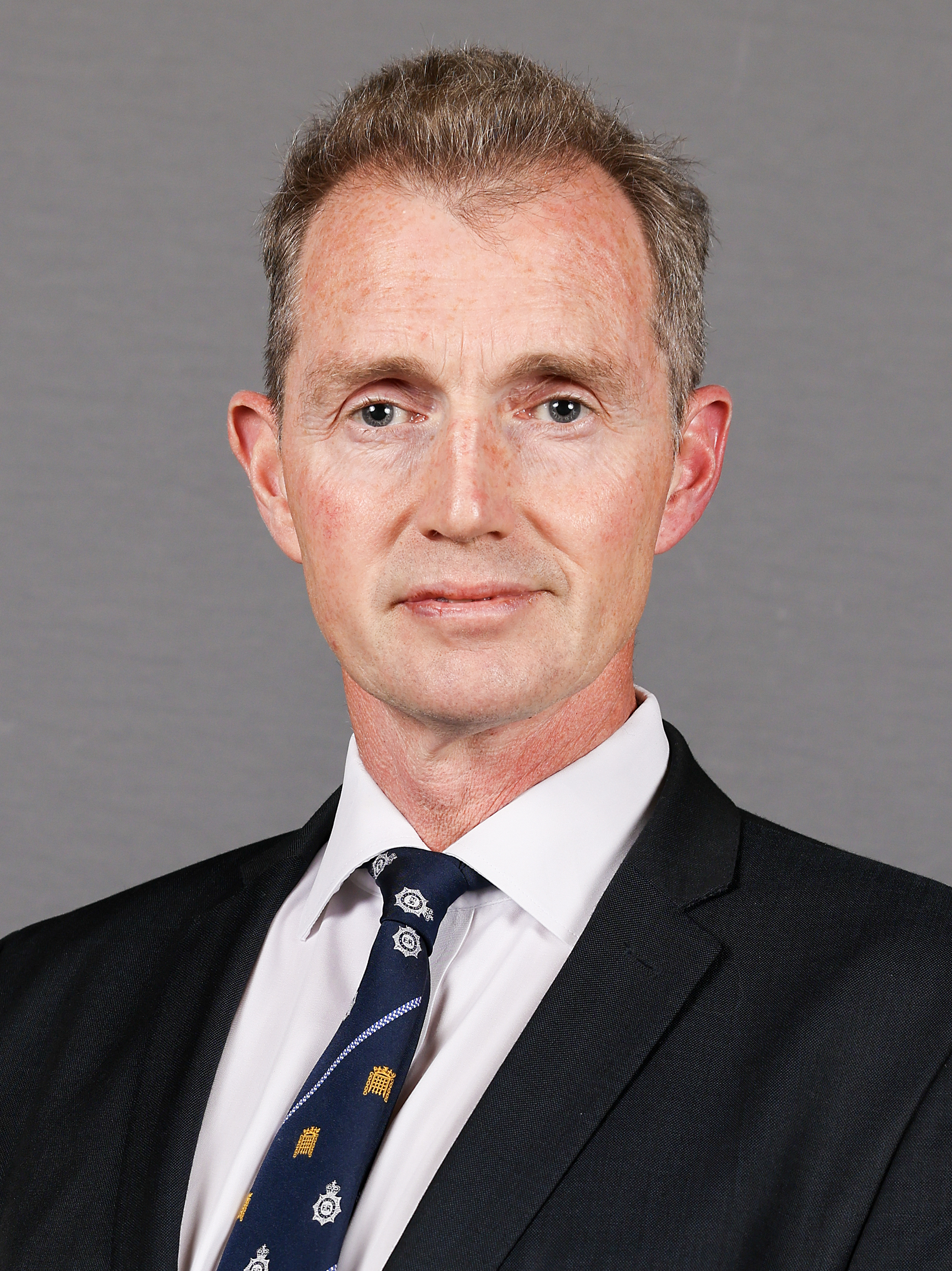
- Official portrait, 2022

Secretary of State for Wales
- In office 25 October 2022 – 5 July 2024
- Prime Minister: Rishi Sunak
- Preceded by: Robert Buckland
- Succeeded by: Jo Stevens

Parliamentary Under-Secretary of State for Wales
- In office 16 December 2019 – 25 October 2022
- Prime Minister: Boris Johnson; Liz Truss
- Preceded by: Kevin Foster
- Succeeded by: James Davies

Lord Commissioner of the Treasury
- In office 8 July 2022 – 8 September 2022
- Prime Minister: Boris Johnson; Liz Truss

Assistant Government Whip
- In office 13 February 2020 – 8 July 2022
- Prime Minister: Boris Johnson

Chair of the Welsh Affairs Select Committee
- In office 8 June 2010 – 6 November 2019
- Preceded by: Dr Hywel Francis
- Succeeded by: Stephen Crabb

Member of Parliament for Monmouth
- In office 5 May 2005 – 30 May 2024
- Preceded by: Huw Edwards
- Succeeded by: Constituency abolished

Member of the Senedd for Monmouth
- In office 6 May 1999 – 3 May 2007
- Preceded by: New Assembly
- Succeeded by: Nick Ramsay

Personal details
- Born: 27 July 1970 (age 56) Newham, London, England
- Party: Conservative
- Spouse: Aliz Harnisföger (m. 2003)
- Children: 3
- Education: Bassaleg School
- Website: david-davies.org.uk

David Thomas Charles Davies (born 27 July 1970) is a British politician who was Secretary of State for Wales from 2022 to 2024. He was the Member of Parliament (MP) for Monmouth from 2005 to 2024. A member of the Conservative Party, he chaired the Welsh Affairs Select Committee from 2010 to 2019. Davies also served as Parliamentary Under-Secretary of State for Wales from 2019 to 2022, and as Member of the Welsh Assembly (AM) for Monmouth from 1999 to 2007.

A vocal critic of the European Union, he supported Brexit in the 2016 membership referendum. Having previously questioned the scientific evidence for the role of human factors in global warming, Davies said in 2019 that he supported the UK government's intention to become carbon neutral by 2050 and that he fully accepted the link between carbon dioxide and climate change.

== Early life and education ==
Davies was born on 27 July 1970 in Newham, London, to Peter and Kathleen Davies (née Elton). A great-grandfather was German and Jewish. He was educated at Clytha School and Bassaleg School in Newport, Wales. After leaving school in 1988 he worked for the British Steel Corporation and served with the Territorial Army. He worked for his family in their shipping company, Burrow Heath Ltd, before entering politics.

== Political career ==
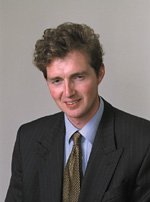
Official portrait, c. 2000

=== Pre-Assembly career ===
He unsuccessfully contested the seat of Bridgend at the 1997 general election, finishing in second place 15,248 votes behind Win Griffiths.

==== Just Say No Campaign ====
As an opponent of the concept of a new Welsh assembly, Davies helped to set up the 'No' campaign in the devolution referendum, and being frequently quoted as a spokesperson or 'prominent member' for the campaign throughout the devolution campaign and referendum.

=== National Assembly for Wales ===
==== First Assembly ====
Davies gained a higher profile and decided to run as the Conservative candidate for Monmouth. At the inaugural 1999 Welsh Assembly Election he was elected to the National Assembly for Wales. He was the only Conservative member to win on a constituency ballot. He became the deputy leader of the Welsh Conservatives and Chief Whip under Rod Richards.

In August 1999, Rod Richards stood down as leader of the Conservative Group in the Assembly to contest charges of grievous bodily harm made against him. He insisted that this would be temporary, and that Davies, as his deputy, would stand in until the matter was resolved. Davies stood in the role for a total of 5 days, between 5 and 10 August, before the Assembly Conservative group elected to appoint Nick Bourne as the group's temporary leader, over Davies. Later that month, Bourne would reshuffle the Welsh Conservative's frontbench roles. Davies retained his role as Chief Whip in this reshuffle, as well as being handed the portfolio for Environment, Transport and Planning.

In 2000, Davies was investigated by the Independent Adviser on Standards of Conduct for misusing Assembly stationary to invite people to see a display he had put together in the Assembly to oppose to repeal of Section 28. The case was dismissed shortly after.

In November 2000, Davies' retained his responsibilities for Environment and Transport, but lost his responsibilities for local government and planning, with these going to colleague William Graham.

In August 2001, Davies made a statement clarifying that Edgar Griffin, father of British National Party founder Nick Griffin was no longer a member of the Conservative Party's welsh campaign team, which Davies had helped to recruit.

Davies supported Iain Duncan Smith in the 2001 Conservative Party leadership election.

In November 2001, Davies was reshuffled away from the role of Chief Whip for the Welsh Conservatives, instead being placed on the Welsh Assembly's economic development committee.

Davies was consistently critical of attempts to grant more powers to the Welsh Assembly, publishing a leaflet in 2002 which stated "Only one in four people voted for devolution in the referendum, so it would be grossly unfair to turn the Assembly into a Parliament by stealth. I believe no further powers should be given to the Welsh Assembly without a further referendum, and that referendum should also include a question, 'Should we get rid of the Assembly altogether'?" He did so after fellow Conservative AM David Melding asked First Minister Rhodri Morgan if he believed the assembly should be granted primary legislative powers.

==== Second Assembly ====
Davies was re-elected at the 2003 National Assembly election, and was again the only member of the Welsh Conservatives elected on a constituency ballot, and received the largest vote of any candidate in Wales. He was appointed as the Welsh Conservative Education spokesperson by Nicke Bourne shortly after. He was also handed the role as Conservative Equal Opportunities spokesperson, and placed on the Assembly's Equal Opportunities Committee.

Shortly after, Davies spotted attempted to hold a Wales-specific referendum on the EU Constitutional Treaty, using Section 36 of the Government of Wales Act 1998, which said "The Assembly may hold a poll in Wales or any part or parts of Wales for the purpose of ascertaining the views of those polled about whether or how any of the Assembly's functions should be exercised." First Minister Rhodri Morgan described the attempt as "[running] contrary to all British precedent" while Wales Secretary Peter Hain described it as "outrageous hypocrisy" - stating that Conservative governments had not held referendums on any European treaties.

In September 2003, it was announced that Davies had been selected to run as the Conservative candidate for Monmouth at the 2005 General Election. At the time he stated he had no intention to stand down as Assembly member for the constituency.

In February 2004, Davies described the Commission for Racial Equality as "one of the best recruiting sergeants the BNP could ever have" on television. He further described the CRE's as having "coined the phrase institutional racism" "because they could not actually pin down any particular examples of racist behaviour." He further described the commission itself as institutionally racist. The CRE's Wales Commissioner Cherry Short described Davies as '"living in cloud cuckoo land" if he believed their work assisted racists.

In April 2004, Davies was removed as Welsh Conservative Equal Opportunities Spokesperson, after he walked out of, and subsequently resigned from, the Assembly's Equal Opportunities Committee. He had reportedly asked a representative of Stonewall "I wonder why you feel a homosexual who is attacked has more rights in the eyes of the law than an elderly lady or an elderly man?", among other questions, after the charity had presented its annual report to the committee. Stonewall representative Derek Walker responded by saying "We don't think any crime against an older person should be treated in a lesser way. Our survey shows it is a big issue in Wales and across the country. We have asked it to be prioritised in the same way racial crime is." Social Justice Minister Edwina Hart had described his remarks as "offensive", at which point Davies reportedly left, describing the committee as "a total waste of time" and said "I simply can't go on". He was replaced as Equal Opportunities Spokesperson by Mark Isherwood.

=== Election to the UK Parliament and dual mandate ===
He was elected at the 2005 general election as member of the House of Commons for Monmouth, the seat he held in the Welsh Assembly. He defeated the sitting Labour MP Huw Edwards by 4,527 votes, and remained the MP for the constituency until the July 2024 election. On 18 May 2005 he made his maiden speech giving a history of his constituency from Geoffrey of Monmouth onwards. After his election to the UK parliament, his role as Welsh Conservative Spokesperson on Education in the Assembly was re-assigned to William Graham. He had previously announced his intention to stand down as Assembly Member for Monmouth at the 2007 Welsh Assembly election. The Conservatives retained the Monmouth seat, at that election with Nick Ramsay being elected.

=== UK Parliamentary career ===
Once elected to Parliament he joined the Welsh Affairs Select Committee on his election. After the 2015 general election, he was returned unopposed the chairmanship of the committee.

In 2008, Davies criticised the National Black Police Association's race-based membership policy for not allowing white people interested in fighting racism to become full members and suggesting that they themselves could be guilty of racism.

In 2013 Davies voted against the Cameron–Clegg coalition government on the issue of British military intervention in the Syrian civil war.

During the trial of fellow Welsh MP Nigel Evans, Davies gave evidence of his character, stating that Evans liked a drink and became jovial when intoxicated, unlike some people who have a dark side. Evans was Davies' best man at his 2003 wedding. In May 2013, Davies said of Evans: "He's been a good friend of mine for a lot of years. I am stunned by these allegations and find them impossible to believe." Evans was acquitted of sexual assaults in April 2014.

In June 2015, Davies strongly criticised the planning and organisation of the first Velothon Wales event to be run in Wales which passed through his Monmouth constituency, arguing that business losses should be compensated for.

In July 2024, Davies contested the Monmouthshire constituency. He lost, with Labour's Catherine Fookes winning by 3,338 votes.

==== Expenses ====
In 2009 The Daily Telegraph reported that Davies had claimed £2,000 of taxpayers' money and paid it to his family's haulage firm. Davies defended his actions in an interview, denying any wrongdoing and explaining to BBC Wales that his family's firm had been paid to provide postage and produce publicity material at short notice for the annual Monmouth show, that they had not profited, and that he had subsequently used a specialist company in London for the production of such material where the costs were significantly higher.

In May of the same year, Davies became the first member of the Commons to voluntarily make his expense claims public. They were scrutinised by an independent panel which he had assembled and it emerged that Davies had claimed £475 for furniture for his London apartment, in addition to the monies paid to his family firm.

==== Welsh Affairs Committee ====
In June 2010 Davies was appointed Chairman of the Welsh Affairs Committee. He is a former member of the Home Affairs Select Committee and is an advocate of tough measures to deal with criminality. Davies is also Vice-Chair of the All-Party Parliamentary China Group and a member of the All-Party Parliamentary British-German Group. In January 2012, the Prime Minister David Cameron announced his appointment as a representative of the UK delegation to the Parliamentary Assembly of the Council of Europe.

==== July 2022 United Kingdom government crisis ====
On 7 July 2022, following the resignation of Secretary of State for Wales Simon Hart, Davies confirmed that he "will not take the role".

=== Secretary of State for Wales ===
On 25 October 2022, upon Rishi Sunak's appointment as Prime Minister, Davies was appointed Secretary of State for Wales, succeeding Robert Buckland.

In April 2023 the Welsh Government wrote to Davies, asking for his consent for legal aid and £1,600 monthly payments to be given to some asylum seekers under their Basic Income pilot. Davies, describing the request as "highly irresponsible" and "indefensible", and arguing the move would "incentivise human traffickers", declined to approve it.

In late 2023, TATA Steel announced plans to close its operations in South Wales, which would have led to thousands of job losses and the end of primary steel making. The UK Government's Department for Business and Trade and the Wales Office were able to negotiate a £500 million support package to keep TATA Steel's operations open, but which would lead to the closure of two blast furnaces and the opening of an electric arc furnace. In an interview, Davies said without the government's offer TATA would have closed – but their operations have now been "saved".

In May 2024, Davies was accused by his counterpart - Jo Stevens - of breaking the ministerial code for filming a video in the Wales Office, where he said: "Do they [Welsh Labour] want to spend £120m on Welsh taxpayers' money on creating dozens of extra Senedd members in Cardiff Bay? Or would they prefer to spend that money on employing more nurses, doctors, dentists and teachers? I know which side I'm on." The Welsh government has defended the plans, saying they are needed to better scrutinise their work which has grown significantly since the National Assembly was established in 1999.

=== Service as a special constable ===
Davies was sworn in as a special constable with the British Transport Police in March 2007. On his third patrol he searched a man 'acting suspiciously' and found a handgun. In August 2011, Davies wrote about his experiences on riot duty and lamented that police were ordered not to go out alone in uniform for safety reasons. Davies had to return from a short holiday for the recall of Parliament to discuss the riots across England and also served on patrols in London that week in his role as a special constable. He called for the police to be encouraged to take tougher action during the riots. He resigned in 2015, after serving nine years as a special constable, because of rules about police officers taking part in politics.

== Post-parliamentary career ==
In August 2024 it was reported that Davies was seeking work as an advisor to the then Conservative Member of the Senedd Laura Anne Jones. On 2 September 2024 it was confirmed that he had begun working for Jones. He wrote on LinkedIn to say that "the chance to return to the Senedd after 17 years was far too tempting to pass up". He left Jones' office in December 2024, and in January 2025 was appointed by Darren Millar as the new Welsh Conservatives Chief of Staff.

In March 2025, Davies additionally began work as a consultant.

== Political views ==
=== Brexit ===
Davies campaigned for Brexit. In May 2019, while attempting a television interview on College Green, Davies was confronted by a pro-Brexit activist, clearly unaware of his identity, who accused him of being a 'remoaner', a 'liar', a 'snowflake' and not a Brexiteer. Davies said that he had voted to leave in the referendum and had voted for Theresa May's failed Brexit withdrawal agreement. The two argued as Davies accused her of having "a big mouth" and "access to a keyboard" and attempted to record the incident on the body camera that was strapped around his torso while she simultaneously filmed him.

In October 2019, commenting on his interventions following the Speaker's refusal to permit a debate on the Government's Brexit agreement, The Guardian's political sketchwriter John Crace described Davies as "one of the dimmest people in parliament – even the sheep in his Welsh constituency have a higher IQ".

In December 2020, when it was announced that the EU and UK had reached a post-Brexit free trade agreement, Davies said: "This is a historic day, because we have shown now we can get control over our laws, our borders, over our money, and at the same time get access to the single market."

=== Asylum ===
In May 2010, Davies was described by a rival Labour candidate, Hamish Sandison, as being on the "far right of the Conservative Party", which Davies described as an attempt to smear him as "some sort of Nazi" for raising concerns over immigration. A critic of the Coalition, Davies wrote a letter in 2012 to his constituents apologising for "incompetence at the highest levels of government" and accusing David Cameron of failing to listen to the concerns of backbenchers and the people who elected them. Earlier, in January of the same year, Davies referred to some communities as having imported "barbaric views on women". Commenting on a rape case, Davies said that upbringing could be a major factor although he saw it as "not an Islamic issue... let me be quite clear, and it's not a racial issue".

In May 2012, during a phone-in on the Jeremy Vine show on BBC Radio 2, Davies told a member of the public that she should join the BNP after she advocated the compulsory teaching of the Welsh language in schools. On his web page, he states his opinion 'that people who come to this country should learn English and be expected to work and to fit in with our rules, culture and traditions'.

Davies was criticised in 2015 for using the Charlie Hebdo terrorist attack to promote the Conservative Party election pledge to abolish the Human Rights Act 1998. Davies said that "under current laws, including the Human Rights Act, anyone can come to the UK and make a claim for asylum", which was rebutted in The Guardian and in an article by Dr Mark Elliot at the University of Cambridge.

In response to the 2015 refugee crisis Davies said that most of the people attempting to enter the UK via Calais were not refugees fleeing war, but were economic migrants "mostly young men, mostly with mobile phones, chancing their luck". Davies attracted media attention in October 2016 with a tweet suggesting refugees to the UK should have dental checks to determine their age. His view was criticised by the British Dental Association which issued a statement describing the test as "inaccurate, inappropriate and unethical". The suggestion was also criticised by the British Association of Social Workers, and the test was also ruled out by the Home Office.

In October 2016, Davies said that a child migrant arriving in the UK from Calais had "lines around his eyes and looks older than I am." Davies appeared on ITV's Good Morning Britain on 19 October to defend dental checks, but became engaged in a heated exchange with Piers Morgan, who accused Davies of demonising refugee children, a charge which Davies denied. Later that year, Home Office figures revealed that more than two-thirds of refugees arriving in the UK who had their age assessed were over 18.

In August 2017, Davies criticised a senior Metropolitan Police officer for suggesting police should prioritise non-English speaking victims of crime amongst other vulnerable groups for personal visits from officers. Davies described the suggestion as "appalling and discriminatory". Davies suggested that the police could save money by not paying for interpreters for non-English speaking victims of crime. When criticised by Matt Lucas on Twitter, Davies responded by calling him a "leftie luvvie comedian" and a "moron", stating: "You happily 'blacked up' for a sketch, then accuse others of racism."

In April 2023 the Welsh Government wrote to Davies, asking for his consent for legal aid and £1,600 monthly payments to be given to some asylum seekers under their Basic Income pilot. Davies, describing the request as "highly irresponsible" and "indefensible", and arguing the move would "incentivise human traffickers", declined to approve it.

=== Travellers ===
In August 2023 Davies was reported to South Wales police during a consultation on potential traveller sites undertaken by Monmouthshire County Council. Davies suggested that the council's consultation was inadequate, and published and distributed a leaflet to constituents in Monmouthshire, which, among other questions, asked "would you like to see a Traveller site next to your house?" Davies denied that the leaflet was racist – and was supported by Oliver Dowden, the Deputy Prime Minister – but traveller groups suggested that it was a further example of "a 'history of hostility' towards Traveller communities" displayed by the Welsh Secretary over decades. South Wales police ultimately decided to take no further action. The Guardian later issued a correction, after wrongly attributing a disparaging comment on travellers made in 1999 to Davies.

=== Climate change ===
Davies called for a debate in Parliament on climate change in 2013 in which he questioned the scientific evidence for the role of human factors in global warming. Davies claimed that "in the 1970s, everyone was predicting a forthcoming ice age". A study of the peer-reviewed literature on climate change published between 1965 and 1979 found just seven articles suggesting that the world might be cooling, and 44 proposing that it was likely to get warmer. The "emphasis on greenhouse warming", it concludes, "dominated the scientific literature even then".

Davies also criticised the government's approach to pursuing low carbon energy saying, "an unholy coalition of environmentalists working with big businesses have persuaded various British ministers to phase out cheap electricity from coal and gas and replace it with non-CO2 generating alternatives such as wind, solar and nuclear."

During a political discussion on climate change in 2016, Davies argued that temperature increases could be explained by the use of different thermometers. He stated that the level of global temperature increase was "perfectly possible to explain away, because we are not comparing 'like with like'. We are using slightly different temperature gauges, the areas in which we are using them have moved, some of the areas that they are in have changed over the years, and they can be subject to something called the urban heat island effect or to other natural factors. So there has not really been an increase since 1998."

In 2019, Davies said that he fully accepted the link between carbon dioxide and climate change. He also said he supported the UK government's intention to become carbon neutral by 2050. In August 2019, Davies criticised the British band The 1975 for going on a world tour, accusing them of hypocrisy after producing a song about climate change.

=== Sex and gender ===
In 2000, Davies opposed the Blair governments' overturning of Section 28. In February Davies asked the Welsh Assembly Government's local government secretary if the Assembly had the power to alter the Blair government's bill to overturn the rule. In doing so he said "I must not be interpreted as homophobic, nor should my party. But I don't think schools should be encouraging homosexuality among people of 14 or 15 who are open to suggestions." Davies was told by the Assembly's local government secretary Peter Law that the bill was primary legislation, and that the assembly had no power to alter it. Shortly thereafter, Davies set up a stall inside the Assembly building, presenting pre-Section 28 educational materials produced by local authorities discussing gay people in sex and relationships education. He was quoted in the South Wales Evening Post as describing the material as "obscene" and asking "what impact [the material] could have on young people?". He was investigated by the Independent Adviser on Standards of Conduct for misusing Assembly stationary to invite people to see this display, but the case was dismissed.

In 2012, Davies opposed his Government's plans to introduce same-sex marriage in the United Kingdom, describing them as "barking mad" due to the possibility that they may alienate the Conservative party's traditional supporters; expanding on these views in a television interview he also expressed the opinion that "most parents would prefer their children not to be gay". He also expressed concerns in relation to educating children about same sex relationships, stating in a 2012 radio interview; "I just worry if children are going to be taught that [heterosexuality] isn't necessarily the norm, and that you can carry on doing all sorts of other things, are we going to have a situation where the teacher’s saying, ‘Right, this is straight sex, this is gay sex, feel free to choose, it's perfectly normal to want to do both. And you know, why not try both out?’ I mean, are we going to have that?" Davies said he was not bigoted, offering the defence that he had once fought an amateur boxing match against the "Pink Pounder", an openly gay boxer.

Davies has criticised reform of the Gender Recognition Act, stating that it would have "a profound impact on the rights of others to maintain sex-based boundaries, protections and rights”. In 2019 he said that trans rights were "overriding those of women" and that trans activism is "barking mad". In January 2018, Davies tweeted, "Somebody possessing a penis and pair of testicles is definitely not a woman ... This should be a biological fact not a matter for political debate." In response he was accused of being a transphobe by the LGBT+ Conservatives group, who described his comment as "abhorrent and out of kilter" with the Conservative Party.

=== "Politicised" charities ===
Davies has been a critic of a number of national charities, such as Save the Children, the RSPCA and the NSPCC, which he regards as behaving in a politically motivated way, and was quoted in 2014 as saying that "this is part of a pattern of charities which focus more on lobbying the government on issues than on their causes."

=== Severn crossing ===
In August 2012, Davies said that he had been persuaded that continuing with a private operator was not in the interests of bridge users, and called on his own government to take state control of the two Severn crossings so motorists and businesses can have VAT-free tolls on a permanent basis. Davies said: "In normal circumstances I would be happy for a private company to run the bridges, but it's important to be pragmatic. It's clear that if the bridges are run by a state body, motorists and businesses would not have to pay VAT at 20% to drive across. The crossings are vital for the Welsh economy, and it's important to get them down as much as possible."

== Personal life ==
Davies married Aliz Harnisföger, who is Hungarian, in October 2003 in Monmouth, and they have three children. His son Dominic works as a research assistant for Reform UK Senedd Member Laura Anne Jones.

A keen sportsman, Davies has fought in several charity boxing matches as "The Tory Tornado" and is a former president of the Welsh Amateur Boxing Association.

Davies speaks Welsh, after learning the language as a beginner when he was elected to the National Assembly for Wales. He was awarded the accolade of Welsh Speaker of the Year and was the first AM to address the Welsh Language Society, Cymdeithas yr Iaith Gymraeg, in Welsh.

Senedd
New title	Assembly Member for Monmouth; 1999–2007	Succeeded by Nick Ramsay
Parliament of the United Kingdom
Preceded by Huw Edwards	Member of Parliament for Monmouth; 2005–2024	Constituency abolished
Political offices
Preceded by Kevin Foster	Parliamentary Under-Secretary of State for Wales; 2019–2022	Succeeded by James Davies
Preceded by Robert Buckland	Secretary of State for Wales; 2022–2024	Succeeded by Jo Stevens
