= John Stradling Thomas =

Welsh politician (1925-1991)

Sir John Stradling Thomas MP

Parliamentary Under-Secretary of State for Wales
- In office 11 February 1983 – 2 September 1985
- Prime Minister: Margaret Thatcher
- Preceded by: Michael Roberts
- Succeeded by: Mark Robinson

Deputy Chief Whip Treasurer of the Household
- In office 6 May 1979 – 11 February 1983
- Prime Minister: Margaret Thatcher
- Preceded by: Walter Harrison
- Succeeded by: Anthony Berry

Member of Parliament for Monmouth
- In office 18 June 1970 – 29 March 1991
- Preceded by: Donald Anderson
- Succeeded by: Huw Edwards

Personal details
- Born: 10 June 1925 Dyfed, Wales
- Died: 29 March 1991 (aged 65) London, England
- Party: Conservative
- Spouse: Freda Rhys Evans (m. 1957; div. 1982)
- Children: 3
- Education: Rugby School
- Alma mater: University of London
- Profession: Farmer; Company director; Broadcaster

Sir John Stradling Thomas (10 June 1925 – 29 March 1991) was a Welsh Conservative Party politician. He was also a farmer, company director and broadcaster.

== Background ==
Thomas was born in the District of Carmarthen in Dyfed, Wales, and was educated at Rugby School and the University of London. He considered careers as a veterinarian (as his father was) and in law, but eventually became a farmer. He served on the council of the National Farmers Union.

== Political career ==
Thomas was a councillor on Carmarthen Borough Council between 1961 and 1964. He contested the parliamentary constituency of Aberavon in 1964 and Cardiganshire in 1966. He became the Member of Parliament for Monmouth in 1970.

Thomas held various ministerial posts during the Heath and Thatcher administrations, including government Whip, Lord Commissioner of the Treasury, Treasurer of HM Household and in the Welsh Office, the later as a result of the premature death of Michael Roberts MP in February 1983. During his time as an whip, the government of the day often came close to losing divisions in the House of Commons as their majority was small. Stradling-Thomas was involved in one such instance, which was recalled by Joe Ashton MP: "We had a tied vote and Leslie Spriggs was brought to the House in an ambulance having suffered a severe heart attack. The two Whips went out to look in the ambulance and there was Leslie laid there as though he was dead. John Stradling Thomas said to Joe Harper, 'How do we know that he is alive?' So [Joe] leaned forward, turned the knob on the heart machine, the green light went around, and he said, 'There, you've lost-it's 311' [the vote had been tied 310-310]."

Toward the end of his life, Thomas' health declined and his activity in parliament slowed considerably. After missing a debate regarding tolls on the Severn Bridge, discontent about his capacity grew in his constituency party, and efforts began to deselect him in 1990. Thomas initially intended to stand for re-election at the next election, but eventually decided against it and stood down, before dying in office in 1991.

He was knighted in 1985.

== Personal life and death ==
In 1957, Thomas married Freda Rhys Evans; they had two children and divorced in 1982.

In his final years, Thomas lived at Dolphin Square in Pimlico, London. He died from lung cancer at a hospital in London on 29 March 1991, aged 65.

Parliament of the United Kingdom
Preceded by Donald Anderson	Member of Parliament for Monmouth; 1970–1991	Succeeded by Huw Edwards
Political offices
Preceded by Walter Harrison	Deputy Chief Whip of the House of Commons; Treasurer of the Household; 1979–1983	Succeeded by Anthony Berry
Party political offices
Preceded by Bernard Weatherill	Conservative Deputy Chief Whip in the House of Commons; 1979–1983	Succeeded by Anthony Berry
