= Brian Mawhinney =

British politician (1940–2019)

The Right Honourable The Lord Mawhinney PC

Shadow Home Secretary
- In office 11 June 1997 – 11 April 1998
- Leader: William Hague
- Preceded by: Michael Howard
- Succeeded by: Norman Fowler

Chairman of the Conservative Party
- In office 5 July 1995 – 11 June 1997
- Leader: John Major
- Preceded by: Jeremy Hanley
- Succeeded by: Cecil Parkinson
Ministerial offices 1992‍–‍1997
Minister without Portfolio
In office 5 July 1995 – 2 May 1997
Prime Minister	John Major
Preceded by	Jeremy Hanley
Succeeded by	Peter Mandelson
Secretary of State for Transport
In office 20 July 1994 – 5 July 1995
Prime Minister	John Major
Preceded by	John MacGregor
Succeeded by	George Young
Minister of State for Health
In office 14 April 1992 – 20 July 1994
Prime Minister	John Major
Preceded by	Virginia Bottomley
Succeeded by	Gerry Malone
Parliamentary offices 1979‍–‍2019
Member of the House of Lords
Lord Temporal
Life peerage 24 June 2005 – 9 November 2019
Member of Parliament for North West Cambridgeshire
In office 1 May 1997 – 11 April 2005
Preceded by	Constituency established
Succeeded by	Shailesh Vara
Member of Parliament for Peterborough
In office 3 May 1979 – 8 April 1997
Preceded by	Michael Ward
Succeeded by	Helen Clark

Personal details
- Born: Brian Stanley Mawhinney; 26 July 1940 Belfast, Northern Ireland
- Died: 9 November 2019 (aged 79) Polebrook, Northamptonshire, England
- Party: Conservative
- Spouse: Betty Oja (m. 1964)
- Children: 3
- Education: Royal Belfast Academical Institution
- Alma mater: Queen's University Belfast (BSc); Royal Free Hospital School of Medicine (PhD)
- Awards: Knight Bachelor (1997)

Brian Stanley Mawhinney, Baron Mawhinney, PC (26 July 1940 – 9 November 2019) was a British Conservative Party politician. He was a member of the Cabinet from 1994 to 1997 and a member of Parliament (MP) from 1979 to 2005.

== Early life ==
Mawhinney was born on 26 July 1940 in Belfast, son of Frederick Stanley Arnot Mawhinney and Coralie Anita Jean (née Wilkinson). His family was heavily involved with an Open Brethren church. He was educated at the Royal Belfast Academical Institution, and studied physics at Queen's University Belfast, gaining an upper second class degree in 1963.

He then began studying for a doctorate from the Royal Free Hospital School of Medicine in London. In 1963, he briefly moved to the United States for his education, settling in Ann Arbor, Michigan but travelling throughout the country, engaging with politics and becoming more involved with Christian evangelism, participating in missions led by Billy Graham. It was also during this time that he met his wife, Betty Oja, whom he married in 1964. He obtained his PhD in 1969, with thesis title Studies on the effects of radiation on mammalian bone grown in vitro. He worked as assistant professor of radiation research at the University of Iowa from 1968 to 1970 and then returned to the Royal Free Hospital School of Medicine as a lecturer from 1970 to 1984.

== Political career ==
Mawhinney joined the Conservative Party shortly after his return to England. He contested Stockton-on-Tees in October 1974 but lost to Labour incumbent, Bill Rodgers. He was elected Member of Parliament for Peterborough in the 1979 election, serving until 1997. He was then MP for North West Cambridgeshire from 1997 to 2005.

Mawhinney was a social conservative who opposed abortion and Sunday trading. He also campaigned prolifically against pornography: he introduced a private member's bill in 1979 to ban indecent images and posters outside cinemas, sex shops and strip clubs, and in early 1980, he called for Keith Joseph to launch an inquiry into a page on the Post Office's Prestel viewdata service, called "A Buyer's Guide to Dirty Books".

=== In Government ===
He was PPS to John Wakeham from 1982 to 1983, and PPS to Tom King from 1984 to 1986. He became a junior minister at the Northern Ireland Office in 1986, and then became Minister of State at the Northern Ireland Office in 1990. In 1992, he became Minister of State at the Department of Health until 1994.

=== Cabinet ===
Having been sworn of the Privy Council in the 1994 New Year Honours, he entered the Cabinet as Secretary of State for Transport that year. He served as Chairman of the Conservative Party and Minister without Portfolio for two years from 1995 until the 1997 election. He was knighted in the 1997 Prime Minister's Resignation Honours.

=== In Opposition ===
He served as Shadow Home Secretary and spokesman for home, constitutional and legal affairs for a year under William Hague before returning to the back benches in June 1998. He stepped down from the House of Commons in April 2005.

=== House of Lords ===
On 13 May 2005 it was announced that he would be created a life peer in the 2005 Dissolution Honours, and on 24 June he was created Baron Mawhinney, of Peterborough, in the County of Cambridgeshire.

Lord Mawhinney questioned the priority David Cameron had given to the Marriage (Same Sex Couples) Act 2013, stating that it was a distraction.

He took leave of absence from the House of Lords in October 2017 for health reasons.

== Outside politics ==
In 2003, he was appointed chairman of The Football League, and in 2004 oversaw a re-organisation of the league structure, renaming the former Division One as the Football League Championship. Deeply religious, Mawhinney was a leading member of the Conservative Christian Fellowship as well as a member of the Church of England General Synod for five years. He was also president of Christians in Sport. Mawhinney was also a patron of Peterborough United until his death in November 2019.

== Personal life and death ==
In 1964, Mawhinney married Betty Oja, an American citizen whom he met during his time in Michigan; the couple had three children. He listed Anglo-American relations among his interests. He wrote two autobiographies: In the Firing Line (1999) and Just a Simple Belfast Boy (2013).

Mawhinney lived in Chipping Barnet, and then Keyston, Cambridgeshire in his later years. He died at a nursing home in nearby Polebrook, Northamptonshire, on 9 November 2019, aged 79.

== Arms ==
Coat of arms of Brian Mawhinney

Crest
A wolverine rampant Azure supporting with the sinister forefoot a portcullis Or at the foot thereof a football Sable and Argent.
Escutcheon
Azure two keys in saltire wards downwards Or between three open books Argent each charged with an icthus Azure.
Supporters
Dexter an American bald eagle Proper beaked and legged Or sinister a sea horse Argent the piscine parts Or.

== See also ==
- List of Northern Ireland members of the House of Lords
- List of Northern Ireland members of the Privy Council of the United Kingdom

Parliament of the United Kingdom
Preceded by Michael Ward	Member of Parliament for Peterborough; 1979–1997	Succeeded by Helen Clark
New constituency	Member of Parliament for North West Cambridgeshire; 1997–2005	Succeeded by Shailesh Vara
Political offices
Preceded by John MacGregor	Secretary of State for Transport; 1994–1995	Succeeded by George Young
Preceded by Jeremy Hanley	Minister without Portfolio; 1995–1997	Succeeded by Peter Mandelson
Preceded by Michael Howard	Shadow Home Secretary; 1997–1998	Succeeded by Norman Fowler
Party political offices
Preceded by Jeremy Hanley	Chairman of the Conservative Party; 1995–1997	Succeeded by Cecil Parkinson
