= Roger Evans (Monmouth MP) =

British politician (born 1947)

Roger Kenneth Evans

Member of Parliament for Monmouth
- In office 9 April 1992 – 8 April 1997
- Preceded by: Huw Edwards
- Succeeded by: Huw Edwards

Personal details
- Born: 18 March 1947 (age 79)
- Occupation: Barrister

Roger Kenneth Evans (born 18 March 1947) is a British politician and barrister who served as the Member of Parliament (MP) for Monmouth from 1992 to 1997. He is a member of the Conservative Party.

== Career ==
Evans was born in 1947, the son of G. R. and Dr. A. M. Evans, and was educated at Bristol Grammar School and Trinity Hall, Cambridge. During his time at university he was a chairman of the Cambridge University Conservative Association, and was elected President of the Cambridge Union during Lent term, 1970.

Evans first stood for Parliament, unsuccessfully, at Warley West in October 1974 and again in 1979, but he was beaten by Labour's Peter Archer each time.

Evans contested Ynys Môn in the 1987 election. It was a Conservative seat with a majority of 1,684 votes from the 1983 election, but the Conservatives lost the seat to Plaid Cymru.

Evans was elected the Member of Parliament for Monmouth in 1992, winning the seat back from Labour's Huw Edwards who had defeated Evans in by-election the previous year. However, at the 1997 general election, Edwards retook the seat. Evans stood again in 2001 when he lost by 384 votes.

Evans, a barrister, was a junior Social Security minister from 1994 to 1997.

He was a guest on episode S0041 of the American public affairs show Firing Line, alongside Irish Socialist Bernadette Devlin, recorded on 25 March 1972, during which he told William F Buckley, an Irish-American,“You’ve got quite a few Irish too; that’s one of your problems in America.”

== See also ==
- 1991 Monmouth by-election

== Sources ==
- Times Guide to the House of Commons, Times Newspapers Limited, 1997 edition.

Parliament of the United Kingdom
Preceded by Huw Edwards	Member of Parliament for Monmouth; 1992–1997	Succeeded by Huw Edwards
