= Donald Anderson, Baron Anderson of Swansea =

Welsh politician (born 1939)

The Right Honourable The Lord Anderson of Swansea PC DL
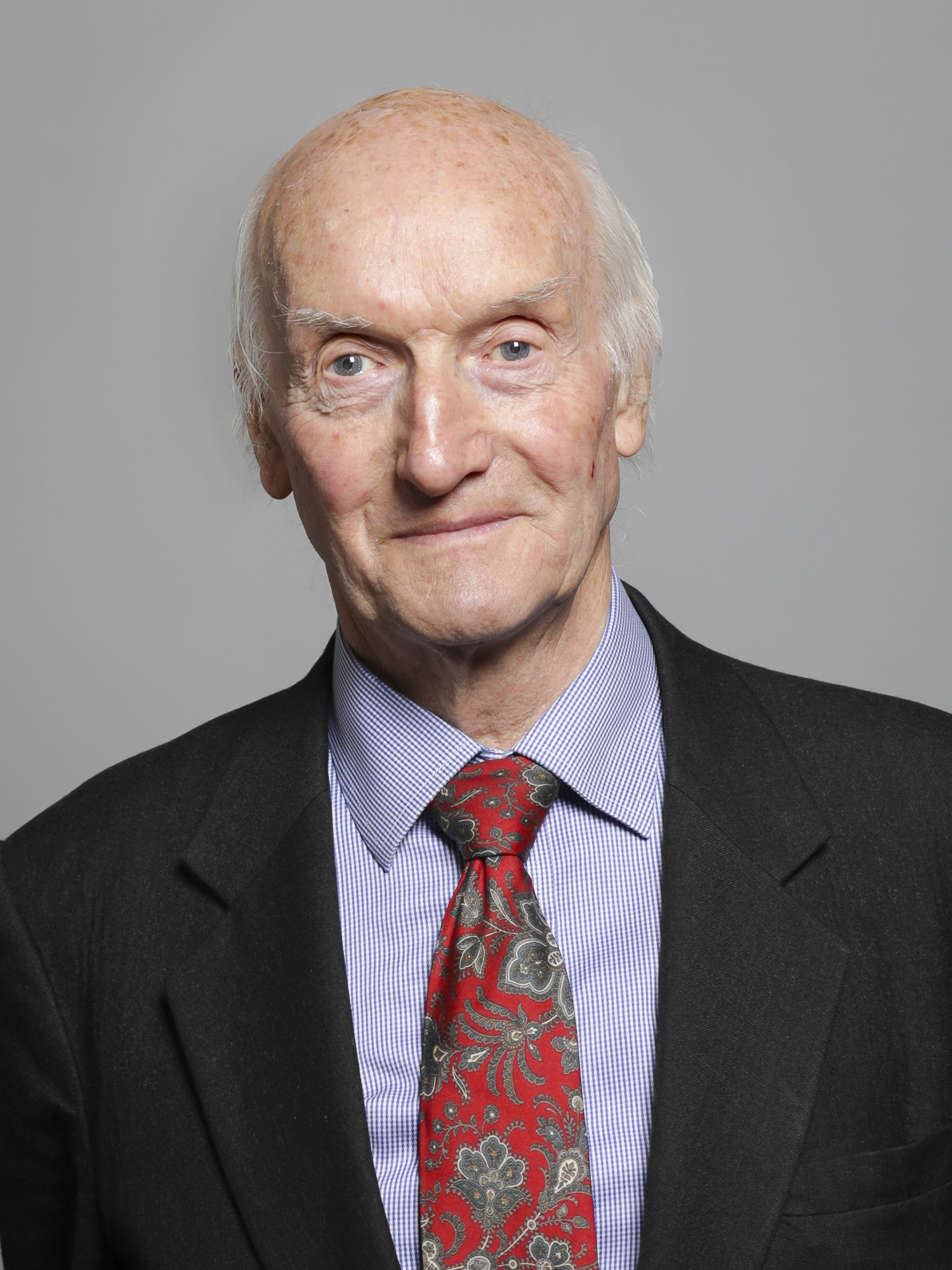
- Official portrait, 2019

Chair of the Foreign Affairs Select Committee
- In office 16 July 1997 – 12 July 2005
- Preceded by: David Howell
- Succeeded by: Mike Gapes

Chair of the Welsh Affairs Select Committee
- In office 20 November 1981 – 13 May 1983
- Preceded by: Leo Abse
- Succeeded by: Gareth Wardell

Member of the House of Lords
- Lord Temporal
- Life peerage 28 June 2005

Member of Parliament for Swansea East
- In office 10 October 1974 – 11 April 2005
- Preceded by: Neil McBride
- Succeeded by: Sian James

Member of Parliament for Monmouth
- In office 31 March 1966 – 29 May 1970
- Preceded by: Peter Thorneycroft
- Succeeded by: John Stradling Thomas
Shadow portfolios
Shadow Frontbench
| 1994–1996 | Solicitor General |

Personal details
- Born: 17 June 1939 (age 87) Swansea, Wales
- Party: Labour
- Education: Swansea University

Donald Anderson, Baron Anderson of Swansea PC DL (born 17 June 1939) is a Welsh Labour politician. Since 2005, he has served as a Labour peer in the House of Lords.

== Education ==
Anderson was born in Swansea and educated at the local Brynmill Primary School and Swansea Grammar School before studying at Swansea University.

== Political career ==
He entered the House of Commons in 1966 for Monmouth until being defeated in 1970 by the Conservative John Stradling Thomas.

From 1971 to 1974, he was a resident in Kensington and Chelsea and councillor in a neighbouring borough.

He then re-entered the Commons in October 1974, as MP for Swansea East. He was sworn of the Privy Council in 2000, and retired from Parliament at the 2005 general election.

In 2003, he voted in favour of the Iraq War.

In the 2005 Dissolution Honours, he was raised to the peerage as Baron Anderson of Swansea, of Swansea in the County of West Glamorgan. He was appointed a Deputy Lieutenant of the County of West Glamorgan in January 2006. Anderson is affiliated to Labour Friends of Israel.

== Personal life ==
Anderson married Dorothy Trotman in 1963 and has three sons.

- Donald Anderson, Baron Anderson of Swansea (1939–)
  - Hon. Robert J Anderson (1965–)
  - Hon. Hugh Jenkin D Anderson (1967–)
  - Hon. Geraint Frank C Anderson (1972–)

Parliament of the United Kingdom
| Preceded by Peter Thorneycroft | Member of Parliament for Monmouth; 1966–1970 | Succeeded by Sir John Stradling Thomas |
| Preceded by Neil McBride | Member of Parliament for Swansea East; Oct 1974–2005 | Succeeded by Sian James |
Orders of precedence in the United Kingdom
| Preceded by The Lord Cunningham of Felling | Gentlemen; Baron Anderson of Swansea | Followed by The Lord Soley |
