= Huw Edwards (politician) =

British politician

Huw Edwards MBE
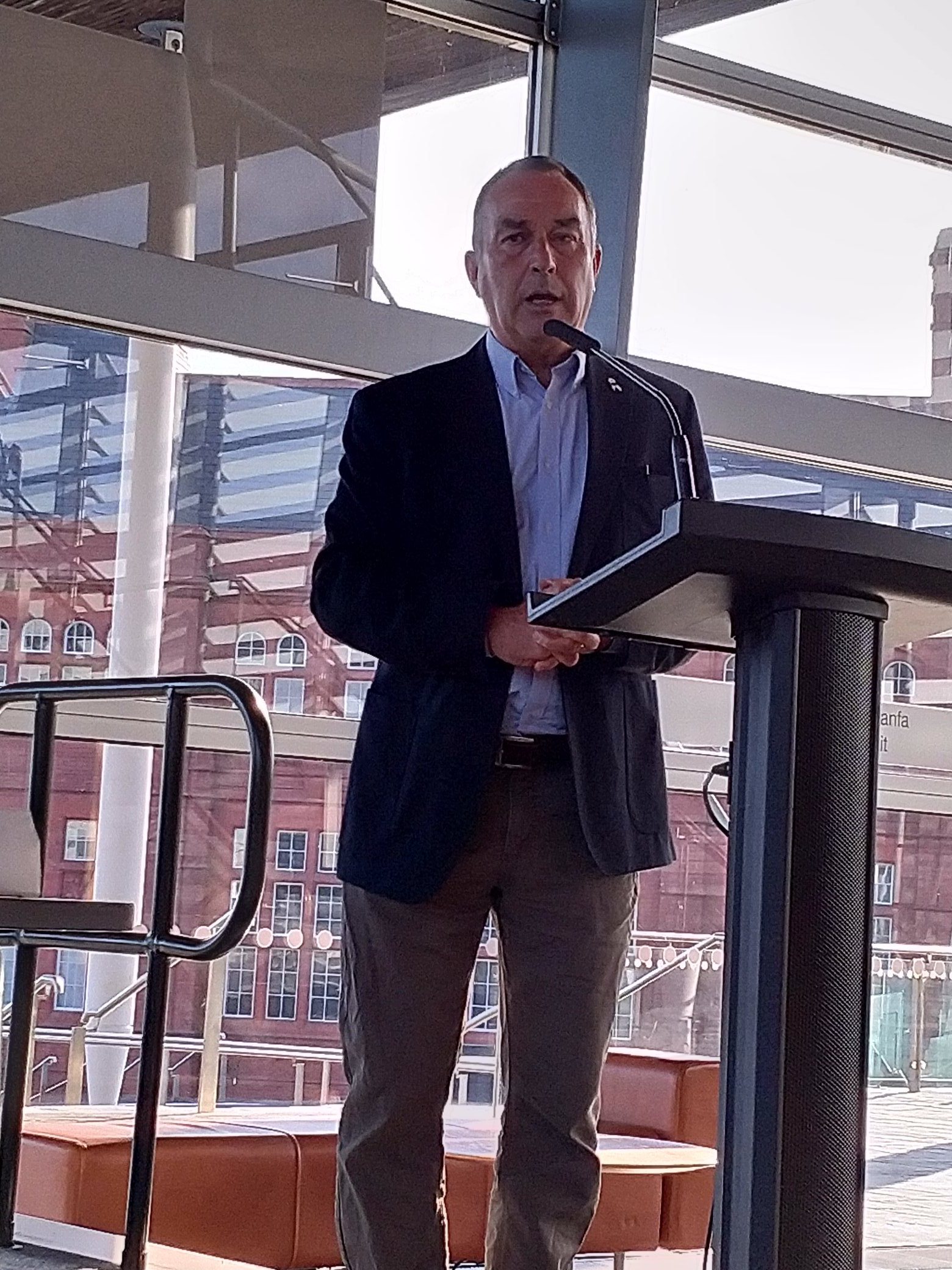
- Huw Edwards speaking in The Senedd, June 2019

Member of Parliament for Monmouth
- In office 1 May 1997 – 11 April 2005
- Preceded by: Roger Kenneth Evans
- Succeeded by: David Davies
- In office 16 May 1991 – 16 March 1992
- Preceded by: Sir John Stradling Thomas
- Succeeded by: Roger Kenneth Evans

Personal details
- Born: 12 April 1953 (age 73)
- Party: Labour
- Spouse: Tess Edwards
- Education: Manchester Metropolitan University

Huw William Edmund Edwards MBE (born 12 April 1953) is a British Labour Party politician who was the Member of Parliament (MP) for Monmouth from 1991 to 1992 and again from 1997 to 2005.

Throughout both of his terms, he served on the Welsh Affairs Select Committee.

Edwards was first elected as Monmouth's MP at a by-election in May 1991, but lost the seat eleven months later at the 1992 general election. He won it back from the Conservatives again in at the 1997 elections, before being ousted by the Conservatives again at the 2005 election.

He is a founding member of Monmouth Male Voice Choir, and was appointed Member of the Order of the British Empire (MBE) in the 2024 New Year Honours for his services to music.

== See also ==
- 1991 Monmouth by-election

Parliament of the United Kingdom
Preceded by Sir John Stradling Thomas	Member of Parliament for Monmouth; 1991–1992	Succeeded by Roger Kenneth Evans
Preceded by Roger Kenneth Evans	Member of Parliament for Monmouth; 1997–2005	Succeeded by David Davies
