= 1945 Monmouth by-election =

UK parliamentary by-election

The 1945 Monmouth by-election was a by-election held for the British House of Commons constituency of Monmouth in Wales on 31 October 1945. The seat had become vacant on the death of the sitting Conservative Member of Parliament (MP) Leslie Pym, and the by-election was won by the Conservative candidate Peter Thorneycroft.

== Vacancy ==
The Conservative MP Leslie Pym had died at the age of 61 on 17 July 1945, twelve days after polling in the 1945 general election, but nine days before the declaration. He was thus unusually declared elected posthumously. Pym had held the seat since a by-election in 1939.

== Previous result ==
General election July 1945: Monmouth
Party	Candidate	Votes	%	±%
Conservative	Leslie Pym	22,195	51.9	−8.2
Labour	A. B. L. Oakley	20,543	48.1	+8.2
Majority		1,652	3.8	−16.4
Turnout		42,738	72.0	+13.8
Registered electors		39,359		
Conservative hold		Swing	-8.2	

== Candidates ==
The Conservative candidate was 36-year-old Peter Thorneycroft, who had been the MP for Stafford from a 1938 by-election until his defeat at the 1945 general election.

The Labour Party candidate was A. B. L. Oakley, who had been the unsuccessful candidate at the general election in July.

== Result ==
On a significantly reduced turnout, Thorneycroft held the seat for the Conservatives, a narrowly increased majority of 2,139. He held the seat until his defeat at the 1966 general election, serving as a senior Cabinet minister in the government of Harold Macmillan.

1945 Monmouth by-election
Party	Candidate	Votes	%	±%
Conservative	Peter Thorneycroft	21,092	52.7	+0.8
Labour	A. B. L. Oakley	18,953	47.3	−0.8
Majority		2,139	5.4	+1.6
Turnout		40,045	39.8	−32.2
Registered electors		60,013		
Conservative hold		Swing	+0.8	

== See also ==
- Monmouth (UK Parliament constituency)
- Monmouth
- 1934 Monmouth by-election
- 1939 Monmouth by-election
- 1991 Monmouth by-election
- List of United Kingdom by-elections (1931–1950)
