= Leslie Pym =

British politician (1884–1945)

Leslie Ruthven Pym (24 May 1884 – 17 July 1945) was a Conservative Party politician in the United Kingdom.

The son of the Right Reverend Walter Ruthven Pym, Bishop of Bombay, Pym was educated at Bedford School and Magdalene College, Cambridge.

He was elected as member of parliament (MP) for Monmouth in Wales at a by-election in 1939. He represented the constituency in the House of Commons until his death during the 1945 general election. Polling took place on 5 July 1945. Pym died 12 days later, but nine days before the declaration of the result. He was declared posthumously elected on 26 July 1945, provoking a by-election in his Monmouth constituency. That contest was won by Peter Thorneycroft.

Leslie Pym died on 17 July 1945, three days before his brother, Revd Canon Thomas Wentworth Pym, and, coincidentally, on the same day as Sir Edward Campbell, the member for Bromley, who was also posthumously elected. During the war-time coalition government, he was a government whip.

Pym was not a descendant of the 17th century Parliamentarian John Pym. His son Francis (1922–2008) was later a Conservative MP and Cabinet minister.

== Sources ==
- Craig, F. W. S. (1983) [1969]. British parliamentary election results 1918-1949 (3rd ed.). Chichester: Parliamentary Research Services. ISBN 0-900178-06-X.
- Leigh Rayment's Historical List of MPs

Parliament of the United Kingdom
Preceded by John Arthur Herbert	Member of Parliament for Monmouth; 1939–1945	Succeeded by Peter Thorneycroft
