= Peter Thorneycroft =

British politician (1909–1994)

The Right Honourable The Lord Thorneycroft CH PC
- by Walter Stoneman, 1948

Chairman of the Conservative Party
- In office 11 February 1975 – 14 September 1981
- Leader: Margaret Thatcher
- Preceded by: William Whitelaw
- Succeeded by: Cecil Parkinson

Secretary of State for Defence (Note: As Minister of Defence until 1 April 1964)
- In office 13 July 1962 – 16 October 1964
- Prime Minister: Harold Macmillan; Alec Douglas-Home
- Preceded by: Harold Watkinson
- Succeeded by: Denis Healey

Minister of Aviation
- In office 27 July 1960 – 13 July 1962
- Prime Minister: Harold Macmillan
- Preceded by: Duncan Sandys
- Succeeded by: Julian Amery

Chancellor of the Exchequer
- In office 13 January 1957 – 6 January 1958
- Prime Minister: Harold Macmillan
- Preceded by: Harold Macmillan
- Succeeded by: Derick Heathcoat-Amory

President of the Board of Trade
- In office 30 October 1951 – 13 January 1957
- Prime Minister: Winston Churchill; Anthony Eden
- Preceded by: Hartley Shawcross
- Succeeded by: David Eccles
Shadow Cabinet portfolios
Shadow Home Secretary
In office 16 February 1965 – 13 April 1966
Leader	Alec Douglas-Home; Edward Heath
Preceded by	Edward Boyle
Succeeded by	Quintin Hogg
Shadow Secretary of State for Defence
In office 16 October 1964 – 16 February 1965
Leader	Alec Douglas-Home
Preceded by	Denis Healey
Succeeded by	Christopher Soames
Parliamentary offices
Member of the House of Lords Lord Temporal
In office 4 December 1967 – 4 June 1994; Life Peerage
Member of Parliament for Monmouth
In office 31 October 1945 – 10 March 1966
Preceded by	Leslie Pym
Succeeded by	Donald Anderson
Member of Parliament for Stafford
In office 9 June 1938 – 15 June 1945
Preceded by	William Ormsby-Gore
Succeeded by	Stephen Swingler

Personal details
- Born: 26 July 1909 Dunston, United Kingdom
- Died: 4 June 1994 (aged 84) London, United Kingdom
- Party: Conservative
- Spouse: Carla Malagola (m. 1949)
- Education: Royal Military Academy, Woolwich; City Law School

George Edward Peter Thorneycroft, Baron Thorneycroft, CH, PC (26 July 1909 – 4 June 1994) was a British Conservative Party politician. He served as Chancellor of the Exchequer between 1957 and 1958.

== Early life ==
Born in Dunston, Staffordshire, Thorneycroft was the son of Major George Edward Mervyn Thorneycroft and Dorothy Hope Franklyn. He was the grandson of Sir William Franklyn and nephew of Sir Harold Franklyn. He was educated at Eton and the Royal Military Academy, Woolwich. He was commissioned into the Royal Artillery as a second lieutenant on 29 August 1929 but resigned his commission on 1 July 1931. In 1933, he was called to the bar for the Inner Temple.

== Political career ==
He entered Parliament in the 1938 Stafford by-election, for the borough of Stafford. He was re-commissioned into the Royal Artillery in his previous rank on 30 August 1939. During the Second World War, he served with the Royal Artillery and the general staff. Along with other members of the Tory Reform Committee, Thorneycroft pressed his party to support the Beveridge Report.

He served in the Conservative caretaker Government 1945 as Parliamentary Secretary at the Ministry of War Transport. In the 1945 general election, he lost his seat to his Labour opponent, Stephen Swingler, but he returned in the 1945 Monmouth by-election for Monmouth a few months later.

Throughout the late 1940s Thorneycroft worked assiduously to refurbish the Conservative Party after its disastrous defeat in the 1945 general election. His opposition to the Anglo-American loan in the Commons earned him a reputation as a parliamentary debater, and when the Conservatives returned to power after the general election of 1951, he was appointed President of the Board of Trade. He was instrumental in persuading the government in 1954 to abandon the party's support for protectionism and accept the General Agreement on Tariffs and Trade.

=== Chancellorship and resignation ===
Thorneycroft's support for Harold Macmillan in Macmillan's successful 1957 leadership contest for the premiership led to his appointment as Chancellor of the Exchequer, one of the most senior positions in the government. He resigned in 1958, along with two junior Treasury Ministers, Enoch Powell and Nigel Birch, because of increased government expenditure. Macmillan, himself a former chancellor, made a famous and much-quoted remark that the resignations were merely "little local difficulties". In reality, Macmillan was deeply concerned about the possible effects of Thorneycroft's resignation.

In retrospect, Thorneycroft questioned the wisdom of his resignation, saying that "we probably made our stand too early."

=== Later political career ===
Thorneycroft returned to the Cabinet in 1960, when he was appointed Minister of Aviation by Macmillan. In 1962, he was promoted to be Minister of Defence. He retained the post upon Macmillan's replacement by Sir Alec Douglas-Home; then in April 1964 the post was combined with the First Lord of the Admiralty, Secretary of State for War and Secretary of State for Air as the Secretary of State for Defence. At Defence, Thorneycroft played a pivotal role in the Sunda Straits Crisis, first supporting and then opposing the passage of the aircraft carrier HMS Victorious through the Indonesian-claimed Sunda Strait during the height of the Indonesia-Malaysia confrontation in August and September 1964.

After the Government was defeated in 1964, Thorneycroft first served as Shadow Secretary of State for Defence under Alec Douglas-Home, before being made Shadow Home Secretary by Edward Heath the next year. Thorneycroft lost his seat at the 1966 general election, and was raised to the peerage as a life peer as Baron Thorneycroft, of Dunston in the County of Stafford on 4 December 1967.

== Later life ==
Thorneycroft was a strong supporter of Margaret Thatcher's monetarist policies and she made him Chairman of the Conservative Party in 1975, succeeding his third cousin William Whitelaw. He held the position until 1981.

He was notable as an amateur watercolourist and held exhibitions. Winston Churchill, when told of Thorneycroft's interest, had said, "Every minister must have his vice. Painting shall be yours".

He was appointed to the Order of the Companions of Honour as a Member (CH) in the 1980 New Year Honours. During his time as M.P. for Monmouth, Thorneycroft lived at Machen House, in the hamlet of Lower Machen, to the west of the City of Newport.

== Family ==
His grandfather was the Victorian Colonel Thomas Thorneycroft, a Wolverhampton industrialist, eccentric, landowner and well-known Conservative; he was asked to stand for election by Benjamin Disraeli. Colonel Thorneycroft owned or leased various houses in Staffordshire and Shropshire including Tettenhall Towers and Tong Castle.

His great-grandfather was George Benjamin Thorneycroft, an ironfounder, JP, Deputy Lord Lieutenant of Staffordshire and first Mayor of Wolverhampton. His grandfather's cousin was John Isaac Thorneycroft who founded Vosper Thorneycroft. Siegfried Sassoon and novelist Ellen Thorneycroft Fowler were Peter Thorneycroft's second cousins, while William Whitelaw was his third. His great uncle was Lord Wolverhampton.

After Thorneycroft's first marriage, to Sheila Wells Page, and divorce, he married Carla, Contessa Roberti (later known as Lady Thorneycroft, DBE) in 1949. He had a son by his first wife and a daughter by his second wife.

Parliament of the United Kingdom
Preceded by William Ormsby-Gore	Member of Parliament for Stafford; 1938–1945	Succeeded by Stephen Swingler
Preceded by Leslie Pym	Member of Parliament for Monmouth; 1945–1966	Succeeded by Donald Anderson
Political offices
Preceded by Hartley Shawcross	President of the Board of Trade; 1951–1957	Succeeded by David Eccles
Preceded by Harold Macmillan	Chancellor of the Exchequer; 1957–1958	Succeeded by Derick Heathcoat-Amory
Preceded by Duncan Sandys	Minister of Aviation; 1960–1962	Succeeded by Julian Amery
Preceded by Harold Watkinson	Secretary of State for Defence; 1962–1964	Succeeded by Denis Healey
Preceded by Denis Healey	Shadow Secretary of State for Defence; 1964–1965	Succeeded by Enoch Powell
Preceded by Edward Boyle	Shadow Home Secretary; 1965–1966	Succeeded by Quintin Hogg
Party political offices
Preceded by Willie Whitelaw	Chairman of the Conservative Party; 1975–1981	Succeeded by Cecil Parkinson
