= 1991 Monmouth by-election =

UK parliamentary by-election

← 1987	16 May 1991	1992 →

Constituency of Monmouth
- Turnout: 75.8% (▼5.0%)
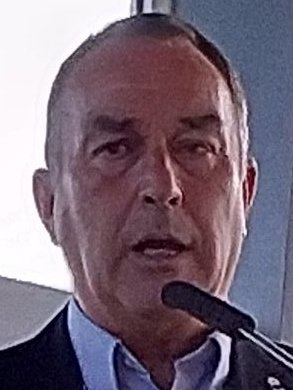
	First party	Second party	Third party
		Con	LD
Candidate	Huw Edwards	Roger Evans	Frances David
Party	Labour	Conservative	Liberal Democrats
Popular vote	17,733	15,327	11,164
Percentage	39.3%	34.0%	24.8%
Swing	▲11.6%	▼13.5%	▲0.8% (Note: Liberal Democrat results are compared to the vote for the Social Democratic Party in the 1987 election.)
MP before election
John Stradling Thomas
Conservative
Subsequent MP
Huw Edwards
Labour

The 1991 Monmouth by-election was a by-election held for the British House of Commons constituency of Monmouth in Wales on 16 May 1991. It was won by the Labour Party candidate Huw Edwards.

== Vacancy ==
The seat had become vacant when the sitting Conservative Member of Parliament (MP), Sir John Stradling Thomas had died at the age of 65 on 29 March 1991. He had held the seat since the 1970 general election.

== Electoral history ==
General election 1987: Monmouth
Party	Candidate	Votes	%	±%
Conservative	John Stradling Thomas	22,387	47.5	−1.6
Labour	Katrina Gass	13,037	27.7	+6.0
SDP	Clive Lindley	11,313	24.0	−4.0
Plaid Cymru	Sian Meredudd	363	0.8	−0.3
Majority		9,530	19.8	−1.2
Turnout		47,100	80.8	+2.0
Registered electors		58,468		
Conservative hold		Swing	−2.2	

== Candidates ==
The Conservative candidate was 44-year-old Roger Evans. The Labour Party candidate was 38-year-old Huw Edwards.

== Result ==
The result was a victory for the Labour candidate, Huw Edwards, who took the seat on a swing of 12.6%.

However, he was unseated at the 1992 general election by his defeated Conservative opponent Roger Evans, who held the seat until Edwards regained it in the Labour landslide at the 1997 general election.

1991 Monmouth by-election
Party	Candidate	Votes	%	±%
Labour	Huw Edwards	17,733	39.3	+11.6
Conservative	Roger Evans	15,327	34.0	−13.5
Liberal Democrats	Frances David	11,164	24.8	N/A
Monster Raving Loony	Screaming Lord Sutch	314	0.7	N/A
Plaid Cymru (Green)	Melvin Witherden	277	0.6	−0.2
Unitax Independent	Peter Carpenter	164	0.4	N/A
Corrective Party	Lindi St Clair	121	0.3	N/A
Majority		2,406	5.3	N/A
Turnout		45,100	75.8	−5.0
Registered electors		59,460		
Labour gain from Conservative		Swing	-12.6	

== See also ==
- Monmouth
- 1934 Monmouth by-election
- 1939 Monmouth by-election
- 1945 Monmouth by-election
- Lists of United Kingdom by-elections
