= 1939 Monmouth by-election =

UK parliamentary by-election

25 July 1939

The 1939 Monmouth by-election was a by-election held for the British House of Commons constituency of Monmouth in Wales on 25 July 1939.

== Vacancy ==
The Conservative MP John Herbert had resigned his seat on 1 July 1939, having been appointed as Governor of Bengal.

== Previous result ==
General election 1935: Monmouth
Party	Candidate	Votes	%	±%
Conservative	John Herbert	23,262	63.4	−1.6
Labour	Michael Mackintosh Foot	13,454	36.6	+1.6
Majority		9,808	26.8	−3.2
Turnout		36,716	76.8	−1.2
Registered electors		47,792		
Conservative hold		Swing	-1.6	

== Candidates ==
The Conservative candidate was 55-year-old Leslie Pym, who had not had previously contested a parliamentary election.

The Labour Party candidate at the 1935 general election had been 22-year-old Michael Foot, who later became Leader of the Labour Party. Foot did not contest the by-election, when the Labour candidate was F.R. Hancock, who had been unsuccessful in Salisbury at the 1929 general election and at a by-election in 1931. He had also been an unsuccessful candidate in Lewes at the 1931 and 1935 general elections. He was also a Quaker and thus opposed to all war.

== Result ==
On a slightly reduced turnout, Pym held the seat for the Conservatives, with a reduced but still large majority of 5,815.

1939 Monmouth by-election
Party	Candidate	Votes	%	±%
Conservative	Leslie Pym	17,358	60.1	−3.3
Labour	Frank Rivers Hancock	11,543	39.9	+3.3
Majority		5,815	20.2	−6.6
Turnout		28,901	58.2	−18.6
Registered electors		49,690		
Conservative hold		Swing	-3.3	

== Aftermath ==
General election July 1945: Monmouth
Party	Candidate	Votes	%	±%
Conservative	Leslie Pym	22,195	51.9	−8.2
Labour	A. B. L. Oakley	20,543	48.1	+8.2
Majority		1,652	3.8	−16.4
Turnout		42,738	72.0	+13.8
Registered electors		39,359		
Conservative hold		Swing	-8.2	

Pym was re-elected at the 1945 general election, but died five days later.

== See also ==
- Monmouth (UK Parliament constituency)
- Monmouth
- 1934 Monmouth by-election
- 1945 Monmouth by-election
- 1991 Monmouth by-election
- List of United Kingdom by-elections (1931–1950)
