= John Herbert (Conservative politician) =

British politician and Governor of Bengal (1895–1943)

Sir John Herbert GCIE

Governor of Bengal
- In office 1939 – 11 December 1943
- Preceded by: The 5th Baron Brabourne
- Succeeded by: Sir Richard Casey

Member of Parliament for Monmouth
- In office 1934–1939
- Preceded by: Sir Leolin Forestier-Walker
- Succeeded by: Leslie Pym

Personal details
- Born: John Arthur Herbert; 16 December 1895 Coldbrook, Monmouthshire, Wales
- Died: 11 December 1943 (aged 47) Government House, Calcutta, India
- Party: Conservative
- Spouse: Lady Mary Fox-Strangeways (m. 1924)
- Parent(s): Sir Arthur Jones-Herbert; Helen Louise Gammell

Sir John Arthur Herbert GCIE (16 December 1895 – 11 December 1943) was a Conservative Party politician in the United Kingdom and a colonial governor in British India, serving as Governor of Bengal from 1939 until his death in December 1943.

== Early life ==
Herbert was born at Coldbrook Park, Monmouthshire, Wales, on 16 December 1895. He was the only son of Sir Arthur James Jones-Herbert, GCVO, of Llanarth, Monmouthshire, and his wife, Helen Louise (née Gammell), of Rhode Island.

== Career ==
Herbert was commissioned a Second Lieutenant in the British Army in 1919. He was elected as member of parliament (MP) for Monmouth in Wales at a by-election in 1934. In that year, he was made an honorary Major. He represented the constituency in the House of Commons until his resignation on 1 July 1939, when he was appointed as Governor of Bengal. Herbert was made an honorary Colonel in 1939 and was also knighted with the GCIE upon becoming Governor of Bengal. During his tenure he had to deal with the devastating Bengal famine of 1943. He served as Governor until his death on 11 December 1943, aged 48. In the House of Commons it was noted "There can be little doubt that his unwearying devotion to duty contributed to the breakdown which ended in his death". Although he is in part blamed for the Bengal famine, it was recognised in the House of Commons that he worked himself to death during this time.

== Personal life ==
On 11 June 1924, Herbert married Lady Mary Fox-Strangeways (1903–1948) in Newport, Rhode Island. Lady Mary was the eldest daughter of the 6th Earl of Ilchester and Lady Helen Vane-Tempest-Stewart (a daughter of the 6th Marquess of Londonderry). Together, they were the parents of:

- Robin Arthur Elidyr Herbert (1934–2024), who studied at Eton, Oxford and Harvard and who married Margaret Griswold Lewis, a daughter of Geoffrey Whitney Lewis (who was with the U.S. Mission to NATO in Paris), in 1960.

Sir John died at Government House, Calcutta, on 11 December 1943. Following his death, his widow served as a Woman of the Bedchamber to Princess Elizabeth from 1944 until her death in 1948.

Parliament of the United Kingdom
Preceded by Leolin Forestier-Walker	Member of Parliament for Monmouth; 1934–1939	Succeeded by Leslie Pym
Political offices
Preceded by Michael Knatchbull	Governor of Bengal; 1939–1943	Succeeded by Sir Richard Casey
