= 1934 Monmouth by-election =

UK parliamentary by-election

The 1934 Monmouth by-election was a by-election held for the British House of Commons constituency of Monmouth in Wales on 14 June 1934. It was won by the Conservative candidate John Herbert.

== Vacancy ==
The seat had become vacant on when the sitting Conservative Member of Parliament (MP), Sir Leolin Forestier-Walker had died at the age of 68 on 13 May 1934. He had held the seat since the 1918 general election.

== Previous result ==
General election 1931: Monmouth
| Party | Candidate | Votes | % | ±% |
|---|---|---|---|---|
| Conservative | Leolin Forestier-Walker | 24,829 | 70.8 | +21.5 |
| Labour | D. Hughes | 10,217 | 29.2 | +4.3 |
| Majority | | 14,612 | 41.6 | +18.1 |
| Turnout | | 45,046 | 78.0 | −0.9 |
| Registered electors | | 44,929 | | |
| Conservative hold | | Swing | | |

== Candidates ==
The Conservative candidate was 39-year-old John Arthur Herbert.

The Labour Party candidate was Rev. D Hughes, who had been the unsuccessful candidate at the 1931 general election.

== Result ==
On a reduced turnout, Herbert held the seat for the Conservatives, with a comfortable majority of nearly 10,000 votes. He was re-elected in 1935, but resigned in 1939 to become Governor of Bengal.

1934 Monmouth by-election
| Party | Candidate | Votes | % | ±% |
|---|---|---|---|---|
| Conservative | John Herbert | 20,640 | 65.0 | −5.8 |
| Labour | D. Hughes | 11,094 | 35.0 | +5.8 |
| Majority | | 9,546 | 30.0 | −11.6 |
| Turnout | | 31,734 | 69.2 | −8.8 |
| Registered electors | | 45,885 | | |
| Conservative hold | | Swing | -5.8 | |

== See also ==
- Monmouth (UK Parliament constituency)
- Monmouth
- 1939 Monmouth by-election
- 1945 Monmouth by-election
- 1991 Monmouth by-election
- List of United Kingdom by-elections (1931–1950)
