= 1938 Stafford by-election =

UK Parliamentary by-election

The 1938 Stafford by-election was held on 9 June 1938. The by-election was held due to the succession to the peerage of the incumbent Conservative MP, William Ormsby-Gore. It was won by the Conservative candidate Peter Thorneycroft.

1938 Stafford by-election
Party	Candidate	Votes	%	±%
Conservative	Peter Thorneycroft	16,754	57.6	+1.2
Labour	Frank G Lloyd	12,346	42.4	−1.2
Majority		4,408	15.2	+2.4
Turnout		29,100	77.2	−1.8
Conservative hold		Swing	+1.2	
