= Monmouth (UK Parliament constituency) =

UK Parliament constituency (1918–2024)

Coordinates: 51.768°N 2.811°W

Monmouth Mynwy
- Former county constituency for the House of Commons
- Boundary of Monmouth; Mynwy in Wales
- Preserved county: Gwent
- Electorate: 65,432 (December 2010)
- Major settlements: Abergavenny, Chepstow, Monmouth

1918–2024
- Seats: One
- Created from: Monmouth Boroughs, North Monmouthshire and South Monmouthshire
- Replaced by: Monmouthshire; Torfaen
- Senedd: Monmouth, South Wales East

Monmouth (Welsh: Mynwy) was a county constituency (Note: A county constituency (for the purposes of election expenses and type of returning officer)) of the House of Commons of the Parliament of the United Kingdom (at Westminster). The seat was created for the 1918 general election. From 2005 until 2024 the Member of Parliament (MP) was David Davies of the Conservative Party. (Note: As with all constituencies, the constituency elects one Member of Parliament (MP) by the first past the post system of election at least every five years.)

The Monmouth Senedd constituency was created in 1999 with the same boundaries as the Westminster constituency. These covered a large area, omitting the mainly urban areas of Blaenau Gwent in the west and Newport, Wales in the south.

The constituency was abolished as part of the 2023 review of Westminster constituencies and under the June 2023 final recommendations of the Boundary Commission for Wales for the 2024 general election. Its wards were split between Monmouthshire and Torfaen.

== History ==
The constituency was considered a safe seat of the Conservative Party although the seat has been won by the Labour Party in three general elections – in addition to the 1991 by-election.

The last MP for Monmouth was the Conservative David T. C. Davies; he was elected in 2005 and was a former member for the Senedd seat of the same name. To avoid confusion with the Yorkshire Conservative David Davis, he is named in Hansard as "David T. C. Davies".

== Boundaries ==
Map of boundaries 1983–2024

=== 1918 to 1983 ===
As first used in the 1918 general election, the constituency was a creation of the Representation of the People Act 1918 as one of six constituencies covering the county of Monmouth. Prior to the 1918 election the county had been covered, nominally, by the county constituencies of Northern Monmouthshire, Southern Monmouthshire, and Western Monmouthshire, and the Monmouth Boroughs borough constituency. By 1918, however, administrative county boundaries were out of alignment with constituency boundaries. The new constituency boundaries took account of the new local government boundaries.

The other Monmouthshire constituencies defined by the 1918 legislation were the county constituencies of Abertillery, Bedwellty, Ebbw Vale and Pontypool, and the borough constituency of Newport. This general pattern was maintained until 1983, nine years after the administrative county they were based on had been abolished, but there were some boundary changes during the 1918 to 1983 period.

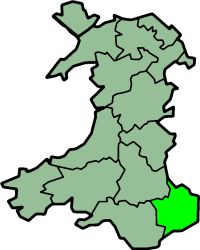
County of Monmouth

In 1918 the Monmouth constituency was defined as consisting of the municipal boroughs of Abergavenny, and Monmouth, the urban districts of Caerleon, Chepstow, and Usk, the rural districts of Abergavenny, Chepstow, Magor, Monmouth, Cwmbran and Pontypool, and part of the rural district of St Mellons. The same boundaries were used for the general elections of 1922, 1923, 1924, 1929, 1931, 1935 and 1945.

New boundaries, created by the House of Commons (Redistribution of Seats) Act 1949, were used for the 1950 general election, and the Monmouth constituency was defined as consisting of the municipal boroughs of Abergavenny and Monmouth, the urban districts of Caerleon, Chepstow, Cwmbran and Usk, and the rural districts of Abergavenny, Chepstow, Magor and St Mellons, Monmouth, and Pontypool.

For the 1951 general election, there was some alteration to the boundaries of rural district of Magor and St Mellons.

The constituency was redefined again for the 1955 general election, taking account of new local government boundaries. The result was the same list of boroughs and districts as for the 1951 election. 1951 boundaries were used also in the general elections of 1959, 1964, 1966, 1970, February 1974, October 1974 and 1979.

In 1974, under the Local Government Act 1972, the local government county of Monmouth was abolished. For the 1983 general election, new constituency boundaries were drawn, taking account of new local government boundaries.

=== 1983 to 2024 ===
The constituency was one of eight covering the preserved county of Gwent. The other seven were Blaenau Gwent, Caerphilly, Islwyn, Merthyr Tydfil and Rhymney, Newport East, Newport West and Torfaen. Merthyr Tydfil and Rhymney, however, straddles the boundary with the preserved county of Mid Glamorgan. It covered most of the local authority of Monmouthshire, with the main towns being Chepstow, Monmouth and Abergavenny.

For the 2010 general election, there were no changes to the boundaries of the Monmouth constituency stemming from the Fifth Review of the Boundary Commission for Wales. Likewise there were no boundary changes in 1997.

== Members of Parliament ==
The following list does not include MPs who actually represented Monmouth Boroughs:

Election	Member	Party
1918	Leolin Forestier-Walker	Conservative
1934 by-election	John Herbert	Conservative
1939 by-election	Leslie Pym	Conservative
1945 by-election	Peter Thorneycroft	Conservative
1966	Donald Anderson	Labour
1970	Sir John Stradling Thomas	Conservative
1991 by-election	Huw Edwards	Labour
1992	Roger Evans	Conservative
1997	Huw Edwards	Labour
2005	David Davies	Conservative
2024	Constituency abolished	

== Elections ==
=== Elections in the 1910s ===
General election 1918: Monmouth
Party	Candidate	Votes	%	±%
Unionist	Leolin Forestier-Walker	9,164	59.7	N/A
Liberal	Hubert Martineau	6,189	40.3	N/A
Majority		2,975	19.4	N/A
Turnout		15,353	55.7	N/A
Registered electors		27,575		
Unionist win (new seat)				

=== Elections in the 1920s ===
General election 1922: Monmouth
Party	Candidate	Votes	%	±%
Unionist	Leolin Forestier-Walker	Unopposed		
Registered electors		29,779		
Unionist hold				

General election 1923: Monmouth
Party	Candidate	Votes	%	±%
Unionist	Leolin Forestier-Walker	12,697	59.9	N/A
Liberal	Morgan Griffith	8,487	40.1	N/A
Majority		4,210	19.8	N/A
Turnout		21,184	80.9	N/A
Registered electors		29,889		
Unionist hold		Swing	N/A	

General election 1924: Monmouth
Party	Candidate	Votes	%	±%
Unionist	Leolin Forestier-Walker	16,510	71.8	+11.9
Labour	Luke Bateman	6,469	28.2	N/A
Majority		10,041	43.6	−20.2
Turnout		22,979	74.1	+3.2
Registered electors		31,031		
Unionist hold		Swing		

General election 1929: Monmouth
Party	Candidate	Votes	%	±%
Unionist	Leolin Forestier-Walker	16,353	49.3	−22.5
Liberal	Richard Charles Williams	8,582	25.8	N/A
Labour	Luke Bateman	8,268	24.9	−3.3
Majority		7,771	23.5	−20.1
Turnout		33,203	78.9	+4.8
Registered electors		42,070		
Unionist hold		Swing		

=== Elections in the 1930s ===
General election 1931: Monmouth
Party	Candidate	Votes	%	±%
Conservative	Leolin Forestier-Walker	24,829	70.8	+21.5
Labour	D. Hughes	10,217	29.2	+4.3
Majority		14,612	41.6	+18.1
Turnout		45,046	78.0	−0.9
Registered electors		44,929		
Conservative hold		Swing		

1934 Monmouth by-election
Party	Candidate	Votes	%	±%
Conservative	John Herbert	20,640	65.0	−5.8
Labour	D. Hughes	11,094	35.0	+5.8
Majority		9,546	30.0	−11.6
Turnout		31,734	69.2	−8.8
Registered electors		45,885		
Conservative hold		Swing	-5.8	

General election 1935: Monmouth
Party	Candidate	Votes	%	±%
Conservative	John Herbert	23,262	63.4	−7.4
Labour	Michael Mackintosh Foot	13,454	36.6	+7.4
Majority		9,808	26.8	−14.8
Turnout		36,716	76.8	−1.4
Registered electors		47,792		
Conservative hold		Swing	-1.6	

1939 Monmouth by-election
Party	Candidate	Votes	%	±%
Conservative	Leslie Pym	17,358	60.1	−3.3
Labour	Frank Rivers Hancock	11,543	39.9	+3.3
Majority		5,815	20.2	−6.6
Turnout		28,901	58.2	−18.6
Registered electors		49,690		
Conservative hold		Swing	-3.3	

=== Elections in the 1940s ===
General election 1945: Monmouth
Party	Candidate	Votes	%	±%
Conservative	Leslie Pym	22,195	51.9	−11.5
Labour	A B L Oakley	20,543	48.1	+11.5
Majority		1,652	3.8	−23.0
Turnout		42,738	72.0	−4.8
Registered electors		59,359		
Conservative hold		Swing	-8.2	

1945 Monmouth by-election
Party	Candidate	Votes	%	±%
Conservative	Peter Thorneycroft	21,092	52.7	+0.8
Labour	A B L Oakley	18,953	47.3	−0.8
Majority		2,139	5.4	+1.6
Turnout		40,045	39.8	−32.2
Registered electors		60,013		
Conservative hold		Swing	+0.8	

=== Elections in the 1950s ===
General election 1950: Monmouth
Party	Candidate	Votes	%	±%
Conservative	Peter Thorneycroft	21,956	55.3	+3.4
Labour	G P Thomas	17,725	44.7	−3.4
Majority		4,231	10.6	+6.8
Turnout		39,681	83.1	+11.1
Registered electors		47,725		
Conservative hold		Swing		

General election 1951: Monmouth
Party	Candidate	Votes	%	±%
Conservative	Peter Thorneycroft	22,475	55.6	+0.3
Labour	Josephine Richardson	17,952	44.4	−0.3
Majority		4,523	11.2	+0.6
Turnout		40,247	83.7	+0.6
Registered electors		48,314		
Conservative hold		Swing		

General election 1955: Monmouth
Party	Candidate	Votes	%	±%
Conservative	Peter Thorneycroft	22,970	57.2	+1.6
Labour	Josephine Richardson	17,173	42.8	−1.6
Majority		5,797	14.4	+3.2
Turnout		40,143	81.5	−2.2
Registered electors		49,252		
Conservative hold		Swing		

General election 1959: Monmouth
Party	Candidate	Votes	%	±%
Conservative	Peter Thorneycroft	25,422	57.0	−0.2
Labour	Gordon Parry	19,165	43.0	+0.2
Majority		6,257	14.0	−0.4
Turnout		44,587	83.1	+1.6
Registered electors		53,628		
Conservative hold		Swing		

=== Elections in the 1960s ===
General election 1964: Monmouth
Party	Candidate	Votes	%	±%
Conservative	Peter Thorneycroft	22,635	44.1	−12.9
Labour	A Calvin Kerr	21,921	42.7	−0.3
Liberal	D Hywell Davies	6,764	13.2	N/A
Majority		714	1.4	−12.6
Turnout		51,050	84.4	+1.3
Registered electors		60,803		
Conservative hold		Swing		

General election 1966: Monmouth
Party	Candidate	Votes	%	±%
Labour	Donald Anderson	28,619	52.7	+10.0
Conservative	Peter Thorneycroft	25,654	47.3	+3.2
Majority		2,965	5.4	N/A
Turnout		54,273	84.3	−0.1
Registered electors		64,356		
Labour gain from Conservative		Swing		

=== Elections in the 1970s ===
General election 1970: Monmouth
Party	Candidate	Votes	%	±%
Conservative	John Stradling Thomas	28,312	46.5	−0.8
Labour	Donald Anderson	26,957	44.3	−8.4
Liberal	David H Hando	4,601	6.7	N/A
Plaid Cymru	Stuart K Neale	1,501	2.5	N/A
Majority		1,355	2.2	N/A
Turnout		61,371	80.5	−3.8
Registered electors		75,602		
Conservative gain from Labour		Swing		

General election February 1974: Monmouth
Party	Candidate	Votes	%	±%
Conservative	John Stradling Thomas	27,269	43.7	−2.8
Labour	F R Thompson	22,707	36.4	−7.9
Liberal	David H Hando	11,506	18.4	+11.7
Plaid Cymru	E H Spanwick	930	1.5	−1.0
Majority		4,562	7.3	+5.1
Turnout		62,412	84.1	+3.6
Registered electors		74,173		
Conservative hold		Swing		

General election October 1974: Monmouth
Party	Candidate	Votes	%	±%
Conservative	John Stradling Thomas	25,460	42.8	−0.9
Labour	Richard Faulkner	23,118	36.9	+0.5
Liberal	David H Hando	10,076	16.9	−1.5
Plaid Cymru	T Brimmacombe	839	1.4	−0.1
Majority		2,342	3.9	−4.4
Turnout		59,493	79.5	−4.6
Registered electors		74,838		
Conservative hold		Swing		

General election 1979: Monmouth
Party	Candidate	Votes	%	±%
Conservative	John Stradling Thomas	33,547	50.5	+7.7
Labour	T M Steel	23,785	35.8	−1.1
Liberal	David H Hando	8,494	12.8	−4.1
Plaid Cymru	Gwyn Williams	641	1.0	−0.4
Majority		9,762	14.7	+10.8
Turnout		66,467	83.0	+3.5
Registered electors		80,085		
Conservative hold		Swing		

=== Elections in the 1980s ===
General election 1983: Monmouth
Party	Candidate	Votes	%	±%
Conservative	John Stradling Thomas	21,746	49.2	−1.3
SDP	Clive Lindley	12,403	28.0	+15.2
Labour	Christopher Short	9,593	21.7	−14.1
Plaid Cymru	Gwynddri Williams	493	1.1	+0.1
Majority		9,343	21.2	+6.5
Turnout		44,235	78.8	−4.2
Registered electors		56,112		
Conservative hold		Swing		

General election 1987: Monmouth
Party	Candidate	Votes	%	±%
Conservative	John Stradling Thomas	22,387	47.5	−1.7
Labour	Katrina Gass	13,037	27.7	+6.0
SDP	Clive Lindley	11,313	24.0	−4.0
Plaid Cymru	Sian Meredudd	363	0.8	−0.3
Majority		9,530	19.8	−1.4
Turnout		47,100	80.8	+2.0
Registered electors		58,468		
Conservative hold		Swing	−2.2	

=== Elections in the 1990s ===
1991 Monmouth by-election
Party	Candidate	Votes	%	±%
Labour	Huw Edwards	17,733	39.3	+11.6
Conservative	Roger Evans	15,327	34.0	−13.5
Liberal Democrats	Frances David	11,164	24.8	N/A
Monster Raving Loony	Screaming Lord Sutch	314	0.7	N/A
Green (Plaid Cymru)	Melvin Witherden	277	0.6	−0.2
Unitax Independent	Peter Carpenter	164	0.4	N/A
Corrective Party	Lindi St Clair	121	0.3	N/A
Majority		2,406	5.3	N/A
Turnout		45,100	75.8	−5.0
Registered electors		59,460		
Labour gain from Conservative		Swing	-12.6	

General election 1992: Monmouth
Party	Candidate	Votes	%	±%
Conservative	Roger Evans	24,059	47.3	−0.2
Labour	Huw Edwards	20,855	41.0	+13.3
Liberal Democrats	Frances David	5,562	10.9	−13.1
Green (Plaid Cymru)	Melvin Witherden	431	0.8	±0.0
Majority		3,204	6.3	−13.5
Turnout		50,907	86.1	+5.3
Registered electors		59,147		
Conservative hold		Swing	−6.8	

General election 1997: Monmouth
Party	Candidate	Votes	%	±%
Labour	Huw Edwards	23,404	47.7	+6.7
Conservative	Roger Evans	19,226	39.2	−8.1
Liberal Democrats	Mark Williams	4,689	9.6	−1.3
Referendum	Timothy Warry	1,190	2.4	N/A
Plaid Cymru	Alan Cotton	516	1.1	+0.3
Majority		4,178	8.5	N/A
Turnout		49,025	80.5	−5.6
Registered electors		60,873		
Labour gain from Conservative		Swing	+7.4	

=== Elections in the 2000s ===
General election 2001: Monmouth
Party	Candidate	Votes	%	±%
Labour	Huw Edwards	19,021	42.8	−4.9
Conservative	Roger Evans	18,637	41.9	+2.7
Liberal Democrats	Neil Parker	5,080	11.4	+1.8
Plaid Cymru	Marc Hubbard	1,068	2.4	+1.3
UKIP	David Rowlands	656	1.5	N/A
Majority		384	0.9	−7.6
Turnout		44,462	71.5	−9.0
Registered electors		62,200		
Labour hold		Swing	−3.8	

General election 2005: Monmouth
Party	Candidate	Votes	%	±%
Conservative	David Davies	21,396	46.9	+5.0
Labour	Huw Edwards	16,869	37.0	−5.8
Liberal Democrats	Phylip A. D. Hobson	5,852	12.8	+1.4
Plaid Cymru	Jonathan Clark	993	2.2	−0.2
UKIP	John Bufton	543	1.2	−0.3
Majority		4,527	9.9	N/A
Turnout		45,653	72.4	+0.9
Registered electors		62,233		
Conservative gain from Labour		Swing	+5.4	

=== Elections in the 2010s ===
General election 2010: Monmouth
Party	Candidate	Votes	%	±%
Conservative	David Davies	22,466	48.3	+1.4
Labour	Hamish Sandison	12,041	25.9	−11.1
Liberal Democrats	Martin Blakebrough	9,026	19.4	+6.6
Plaid Cymru	Jonathan Clark	1,273	2.7	+0.5
UKIP	Derek Rowe	1,126	2.4	+1.2
Green	Steve Millson	587	1.3	N/A
Rejected ballots		75		
Majority		10,425	22.4	+12.5
Turnout		46,519	72.2	−0.2
Registered electors		64,538		
Conservative hold		Swing	+6.2	

Of the 75 rejected ballots:

- 54 were either unmarked or it was uncertain who the vote was for.
- 20 voted for more than one candidate.
- 1 had writing or mark by which the voter could be identified.

General election 2015: Monmouth
Party	Candidate	Votes	%	±%
Conservative	David Davies	23,701	49.9	+1.6
Labour	Ruth Jones	12,719	26.8	+0.9
UKIP	Gareth Dunn	4,942	10.4	+8.0
Liberal Democrats	Veronica German	2,496	5.3	−14.1
Plaid Cymru	Jonathan Clark	1,875	3.9	+1.2
Green	Christopher Were	1,629	3.4	+2.1
English Democrat	Stephen Morris	100	0.2	N/A
Rejected ballots		104		
Majority		10,982	23.1	+0.7
Turnout		47,462	76.2	+4.0
Registered electors		62,248		
Conservative hold		Swing	+0.3	

Of the 104 rejected ballots:

- 70 were either unmarked or it was uncertain who the vote was for.
- 30 voted for more than one candidate.
- 4 had writing or mark by which the voter could be identified.

General election 2017: Monmouth
Party	Candidate	Votes	%	±%
Conservative	David Davies	26,411	53.1	+3.2
Labour	Ruth Jones	18,205	36.6	+9.8
Liberal Democrats	Veronica German	2,064	4.2	−1.1
Plaid Cymru	Carole Damon	1,338	2.7	−1.2
Green	Ian Chandler	954	1.9	−1.5
UKIP	Roy Neale	762	1.5	−8.9
Rejected ballots		64		
Majority		8,206	16.5	−6.6
Turnout		49,734	76.6	+0.4
Registered electors		64,909		
Conservative hold		Swing	-3.3	

Of the 64 rejected ballots:

- 57 were either unmarked or it was uncertain who the vote was for.
- 7 voted for more than one candidate.

General election 2019: Monmouth
Party	Candidate	Votes	%	±%
Conservative	David Davies	26,160	52.1	−1.0
Labour	Yvonne Murphy	16,178	32.2	−4.4
Liberal Democrats	Alison Willott	4,909	9.8	+5.6
Green	Ian Chandler	1,353	2.7	+0.8
Plaid Cymru	Hugh Kocan	1,182	2.4	−0.3
Independent	Martyn Ford	435	0.9	N/A
Rejected ballots		136		
Majority		9,982	19.9	+3.4
Turnout		50,217	74.8	−1.8
Registered electors		67,094		
Conservative hold		Swing	+1.7	

Of the 136 rejected ballots:

- 112 were either unmarked or it was uncertain who the vote was for.
- 24 voted for more than one candidate.

== See also ==
- Monmouth (Senedd constituency)
- List of parliamentary constituencies in Gwent
- List of UK Parliament constituencies in Wales

== Notes ==
Parliament of the United Kingdom
Preceded by Bromley	Constituency represented by the chancellor of the Exchequer; 1957–1958	Succeeded by Tiverton
