= Forestier =

Forestier is a French-language surname meaning "forester". Notable people with the surname include:

- Amédée Forestier
- Carlos Forestier
- Jacques Forestier
- Jean Forestier
- Jean-Claude Nicolas Forestier
- Louise Forestier
- Mathurin Forestier
- Maxime Le Forestier
- Sara Forestier

== See also ==
- Alfred Masson-Forestier
- Sir Leolin Forestier-Walker, 1st Baronet
- Forestier-Walker baronets
- Diffuse idiopathic skeletal hyperostosis, also called Forestier's disease
- Forester
