= Sir George Forestier-Walker, 3rd Baronet =

British soldier

Major Sir George Forestier-Walker, Bt JP DL
- Born: George Ferdinand Forestier-Walker; 7 July 1855
- Died: 18 July 1933 (aged 78)
- Spouse: Georgina Emily Chamberlain (m. 1897; died 1910)
- Children: Sir George Forestier-Walker, 4th Baronet; Nesta Kenyon-Slaney; Godfrey George Forestier-Walker
- Parent(s): Sir George Forestier-Walker, 2nd Baronet; Hon. Fanny Henrietta Morgan
- Relatives: Leolin Forestier-Walker (brother); Sir George Walker, 1st Baronet (grandfather); Charles Morgan, 1st Baron Tredegar (grandfather)

Sir George Ferdinand Forestier-Walker, 3rd Baronet JP DL (7 July 1855 – 18 July 1933) was a British soldier.

== Early life ==
George Ferdinand Forestier-Walker was born on 7 July 1855. He was the eldest of eight sons of Sir George Forestier-Walker, 2nd Baronet, and the Hon. Fanny Henrietta Morgan (c. 1835–1887). His younger siblings included Radziwill Frederick Forestier-Walker (who married Eva Laura Justice), Clarence Francis Forestier-Walker (who married Blanche Lancaster Clark), Ivor Augustus Forestier-Walker (who married Georgina Osborne, and, after her death, Agnes Maud Mayhew), Devereux Philip Forestier-Walker (who married Isabella Constance Dalgety), Sir Leolin Forestier-Walker, 1st Baronet, MP for Monmouth (who married Alice Blandy-Jenkins), Roland Stuart Forestier-Walker (who married Olive Bassett, and, after their divorce, Norah Jacintha (née Phipps), Lady Fuller, the widow of Sir John Fuller, 1st Baronet), and Charles Evelyn Forestier-Walker (who married Ada Llewelyn Mansel).

His paternal grandparents were Gen. Sir George Walker, 1st Baronet, and, his second wife, the former Helen Caldcleugh (a daughter of Alexander Caldcleugh). His maternal grandparents were Charles Morgan, 1st Baron Tredegar, longtime MP for Brecon, and the former Rosamund Mundy.

== Career ==
He served as a major in the Royal Welch Fusiliers.

Upon the death of his father on 1 August 1896, he succeeded as the 3rd Baronet Walker, of Castleton, Monmouth, which had been created in the Baronetage of the United Kingdom for his grandfather in 1835. He inherited the family seat, Castleton, near Cardiff. He served as deputy lieutenant and justice of the peace for Monmouthshire.

== Personal life ==
On 26 August 1897, Forestier-Walker was married to Georgina Emily Chamberlain (1868–1910), a daughter of Robert Deane Chamberlain and Georgina Phayre (sister of Sir Arthur Purves Phayre and Sir Robert Phayre). Together, they were the parents of:

- Sir George Ferdinand Forestier-Walker, 4th Baronet (1899–1976), a Major in the Coldstream Guards who never married.
- Nesta Forestier-Walker (1900–1947), who married Maj. Robert Orlando Rodolph Kenyon-Slaney, son of Col. Rt. Hon. William Kenyon-Slaney and Lady Mabel Bridgeman (a daughter of the 3rd Earl of Bradford), in 1931.
- Godfrey George Forestier-Walker (1901–1906), who died young.

Sir George died on 18 July 1933. Upon his death, he was succeeded by his only surviving son, George. (Note: Upon the death of his son, George in 1976, who died unmarried and without male issue, the baronetcy passed to Clive Forestier-Walker (1922–1983), the son of George's cousin, Radzivill Clive Forestier-Walker (the only son of the 3rd Baronet's younger brother, Radzivill Frederick Forestier-Walker). When Clive died in 1983 without male issue, the baronetcy passed to Michael Forestier-Walker (b. 1949), the son of another of George's cousin, Ivor Augustus Forestier-Walker (the eldest son of the 3rd Baronet's younger brother, Ivor Augustus Forestier-Walker).)

=== Descendants ===
Through his daughter Nesta, he was a grandfather of William Simon Rodolph Kenyon-Slaney (b. 1932), who served as High Sheriff of Shropshire, Vice-Lord Lieutenant of Shropshire, Deputy Lieutenant of Shropshire, and was a director of South Staffordshire Group plc between 1988 and 2002; he married Mary Helena Bridgeman (a daughter of Lt.-Col. Hon. Henry Bridgeman and granddaughter of the 4th Earl of Bradford)

== Notes ==
Baronetage of the United Kingdom
Preceded by George Ferdinand Radziwill Forestier-Walker	Baronet (of Castleton, Monmouth); 1896–1933	Succeeded by George Ferdinand Forestier-Walker
