= Leolin Forestier-Walker =

British politician

Sir Leolin Forestier-Walker Bt KBE DL

Member of Parliament for Monmouth
- In office 1918–1934
- Preceded by: Lewis Haslam
- Succeeded by: John Arthur Herbert

Personal details
- Born: Charles Leolin Walker; 6 May 1866
- Died: 13 May 1934 (aged 68)
- Party: Conservative
- Spouse: Alice Blandy-Jenkins
- Children: Daphne Forestier-Walker Jones
- Parent(s): Sir George Forestier-Walker, 2nd Baronet; Hon. Fanny Henrietta Morgan

Sir Charles Leolin Forestier-Walker, 1st Baronet, KBE, DL (6 May 1866 – 13 May 1934) was a Conservative Party politician in the United Kingdom.

== Early life ==
He was a younger son of Sir George Forestier-Walker, 2nd Baronet and the former Hon. Fanny Henrietta Morgan, a younger daughter of Charles Morgan, 1st Baron Tredegar. Among his siblings were Sir George Forestier-Walker, 3rd Baronet.

His grandfather was Gen. Sir George Walker, 1st Baronet, Governor of Grenada who was a Groom of the Bedchamber to the Duke of Sussex.

== Career ==
At the 1918 general election, he was elected as Member of Parliament (MP) for Monmouth in Wales and held the seat until his death in 1934, aged 68. At the consequent by-election, the Monmouth seat was held by the Conservatives. In addition to being an MP, he was also a Forestry Commissioner from 1920 to 1929. In 1921 he was also appointed a Mental Health Commissioner, under the terms of the Mental Deficiency Act 1913.

Forestier-Walker was created a baronet (of Rhiwderin in the County of Monmouth) in the Baronetage of the United Kingdom in the 1924 Birthday Honours. In the 1925 Birthday Honours, he was honoured as a Knight Commander of the Order of the British Empire (KBE). In 1934 he was created a Knight of Justice in the Venerable Order of Saint John.

== Personal life ==
Forestier-Walker was married Alice Blandy-Jenkins, a daughter of Col. John Blandy-Jenkins of Llanharan House. Together, they were the parents of:

- Rosemary Forestier-Walker (1898–1958), who married John David Griffiths, son of William Griffiths, in 1925.
- Daphne Forestier-Walker (b. 1902), who married Maj. Gavin David Young, son of George Young, in 1922.

Sir Leolin Forestier-Walker died on 13 May 1934. As he had no male issue, the baronetcy became extinct.

=== Descendants ===
Through his daughter Daphne, he was a grandfather of Gavin Young, the war correspondent and travel writer.

== Arms ==
Coat of arms of Forestier-Walker of Rhiwderin
Crest On a mural crown Or, encircled by a wreath of laurel Vert, an ostrich Proper, resting the dexter foot on a shell exploding Proper. Escutcheon Erminois, on a pile embattled Azure, a mural crown charged with the word 'Badajoz' between two caltrops in pale Or. Motto Nil desperandum (Do not despair)

== Notes ==
Parliament of the United Kingdom
Preceded by Lewis Haslam	Member of Parliament for Monmouth; 1918 – 1934	Succeeded by John Arthur Herbert
Baronetage of the United Kingdom
New creation	Baronet (of Rhiwderin in the County of Monmouth); 1929 – 1956	Extinct
