= Victor von Gibelin =

Swiss military officer in French service

- Chevalier
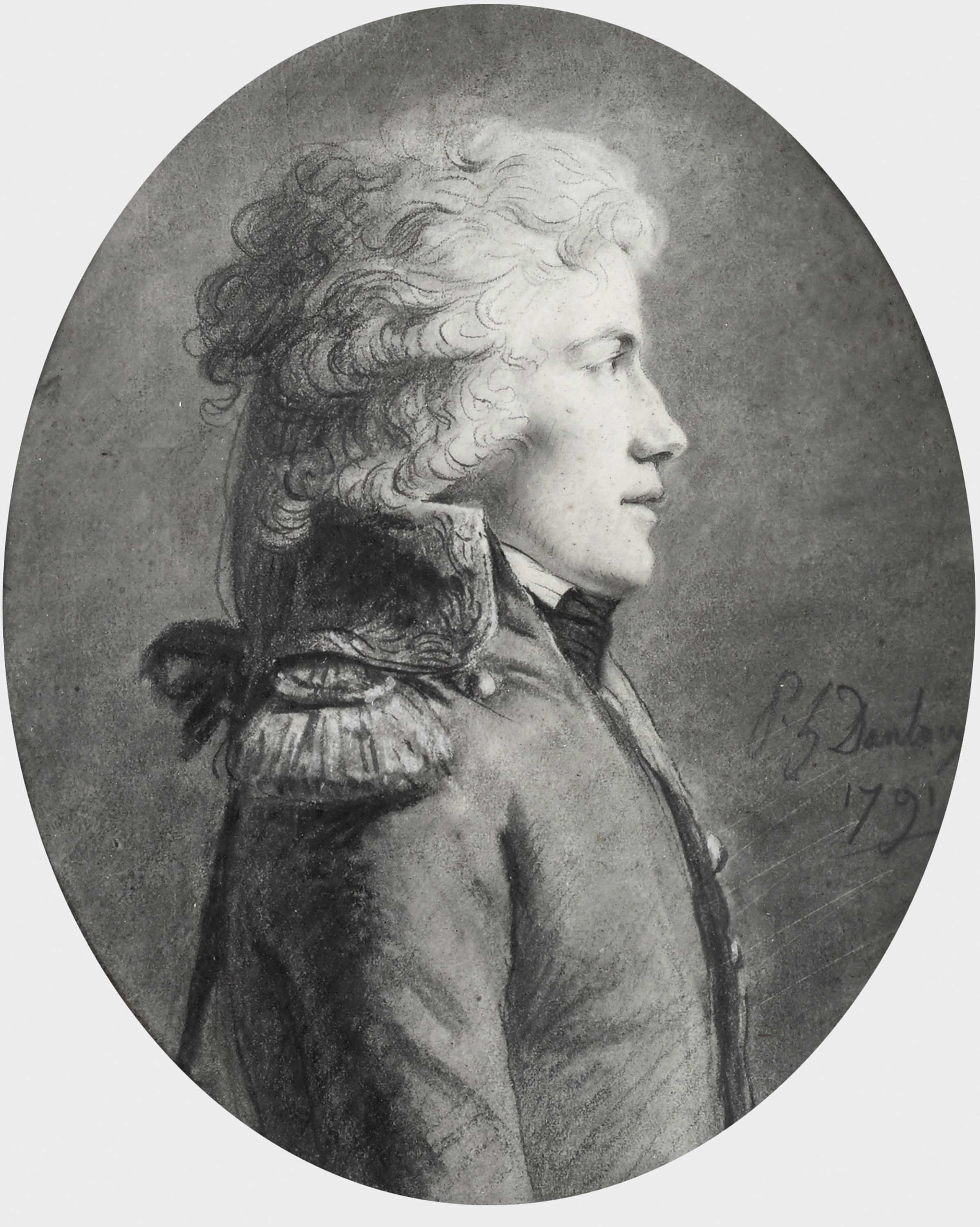
- Victor von Gibelin, chalk drawing by Henri-Pierre Danloux, portrayed in Paris in 1791.
- Born: 24 January 1771; Solothurn, Switzerland
- Died: 3 September 1853 (aged 82); Solothurn, Switzerland
- Noble family: House of Gibelin
- Father: Heinrich Daniel von Gibelin (1726–1783)
- Mother: Maria Anna Ludovica von Gibelin, née von Roll

Victor von Gibelin (1771–1853), also known as Beau Gibelin because of his beauty, was a Swiss military officer in French service and a politician in his hometown of Solothurn in Switzerland. He was the last officer of the Swiss Guards under King Louis XVI.

Victor von Gibelin became famous for different reasons:

- His friendship with Pierre Victor, Baron de Besenval de Brunstatt, a Swiss military officer in French service from Solothurn;
- The meeting with the Prince of Wales, later King George IV, on his escape from the French Revolution in 1792;
- As one of the leading exponents of the anti-Helvetic resistance in the period between 1798 and 1802.

However, he became famous beyond Switzerland's borders for his eyewitness report of the events surrounding the Storming of the Palais des Tuileries on 10 August 1792, where he narrowly escaped death. His report was published posthumously in German and in French in 1866.

"Come, let us see – the handsome Gibelin stands guard."

— Jakob Amiet (1817–1883), a contemporary saying about Victor von Gibelin at the court of Versailles

== Early years ==
Victor von Gibelin was born in Solothurn. His father was Heinrich Daniel von Gibelin (1726–1783), a Swiss military officer in French service and a politician in Solothurn. His mother was Maria Anna Ludovica von Gibelin, née von Roll. In his early years he was educated at home by a tutor named Gisiger. From 1783 to 1786 he attended the Gymnasium in Solothurn.

=== A friend for life ===
The tutor Gisiger remained a loyal friend to Victor von Gibelin throughout his life. Gisiger later emigrated to Rouen, where he settled as a merchant. In September 1792, when Victor von Gibelin was on the run with his comrade Anton von Glutz-Ruchti (1756–1837), Gisiger provided the two with false passports and false identities as Portuguese merchants, enabling them to further escape to Dieppe and ultimately to England.

== In French service ==
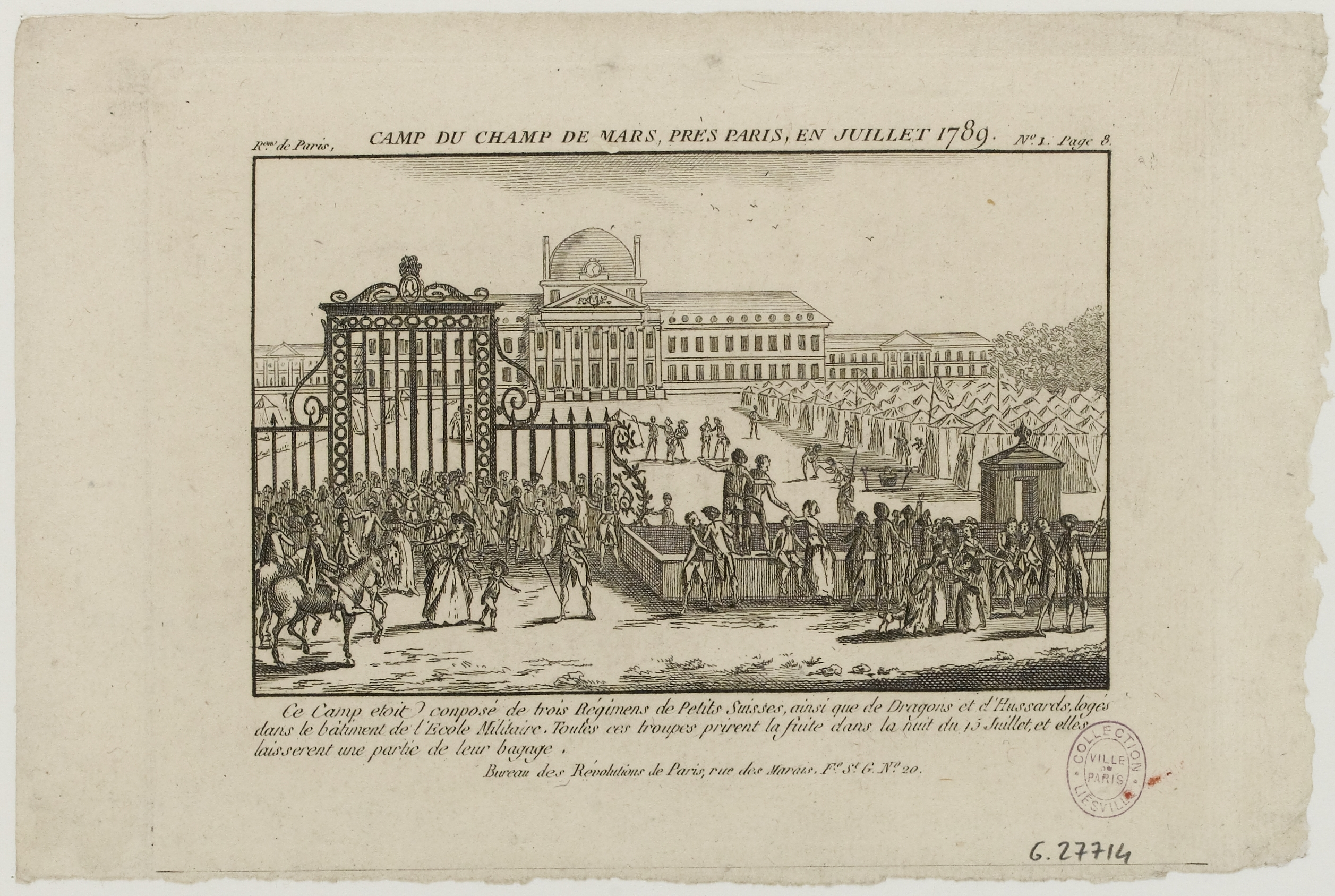
14 July 1789: The Baron de Besenval's troops in the courtyard of the École militaire on the Champ de Mars, consisting of the Swiss Regiments de Diesbach, de Châteauvieux and de Salis-Samade, the latter was the regiment in which Victor von Gibelin and Ludwig von Flüe served at that time, as well as the French Hussar Regiments de Berchény and de Chamborant. After the Taking of the Bastille on 14 July 1789 by the revolutionaries, the baron's troops hastily withdrew on the night of 14 to 15 July.

In 1786, Victor von Gibelin became a sous-lieutenant of the Swiss Régiment de Salis-Samade in France. In this capacity, in July 1789, he stood with his regiment on the Champ de Mars side by side with Pierre Victor, Baron de Besenval de Brunstatt, an influential Swiss military officer in French service and close friend of King Louis XVI and Queen Marie-Antoinette. In 1789, the Baron de Besenval was appointed Commandant en chef of the troops brought to Paris to suppress the riots which had been going on for some time. After 14 July 1789, Victor von Gibelin transferred to the Company de Besenval of the Swiss Guards in the same military rank, but in the function of an Officier-Major. On 10 August 1792, as Sous-Aide-Major, he commanded a battalion of the Swiss Guards during the Storming of the Palais des Tuileries, where he narrowly escaped death.

=== The Last Supper with the Baron de Besenval ===
On 2 June 1791, Victor von Gibelin was a guest at a memorable dinner at the Hôtel de Besenval, the Baron de Besenval's hôtel particulier in Paris. Pierre Victor de Besenval had invited 25 people, including:

- His mistress Catherine-Louise, Marquise de Courcelles et de La Suze, née de Santo-Domingo (1757–1826), wife of Louis-François de Chamillart, Marquis de Courcelles et de La Suze. The marquise acted as the lady of the house that evening
- His illegitimate son Joseph-Alexandre Pierre, Vicomte de Ségur
- His secretary, Jean-Baptiste-Denis Després
- Pierre Georges Félicien de Boffin d'Argenson, Comte de Puisigneu (* 1750), Commandant du Régiment Royal-Lorraine cavalerie, and his wife Louise Adélaïde Julie, Comtesse de Puisigneu, née de Santo-Domingo, sister of the Baron de Besenval's mistress
- Maréchal Philippe Henri, Marquis de Ségur, and his son Louis Philippe, Comte de Ségur
- Franz Joseph, Baron von Roll von Emmenholz, a relative of Pierre Victor de Besenval from Solothurn and owner of the Palais Besenval
- Victor von Gibelin's Swiss Guard comrade and compatriot from Solothurn, the Aide-Major Anton von Glutz-Ruchti (1756–1837)

==== The baron's last appearance ====
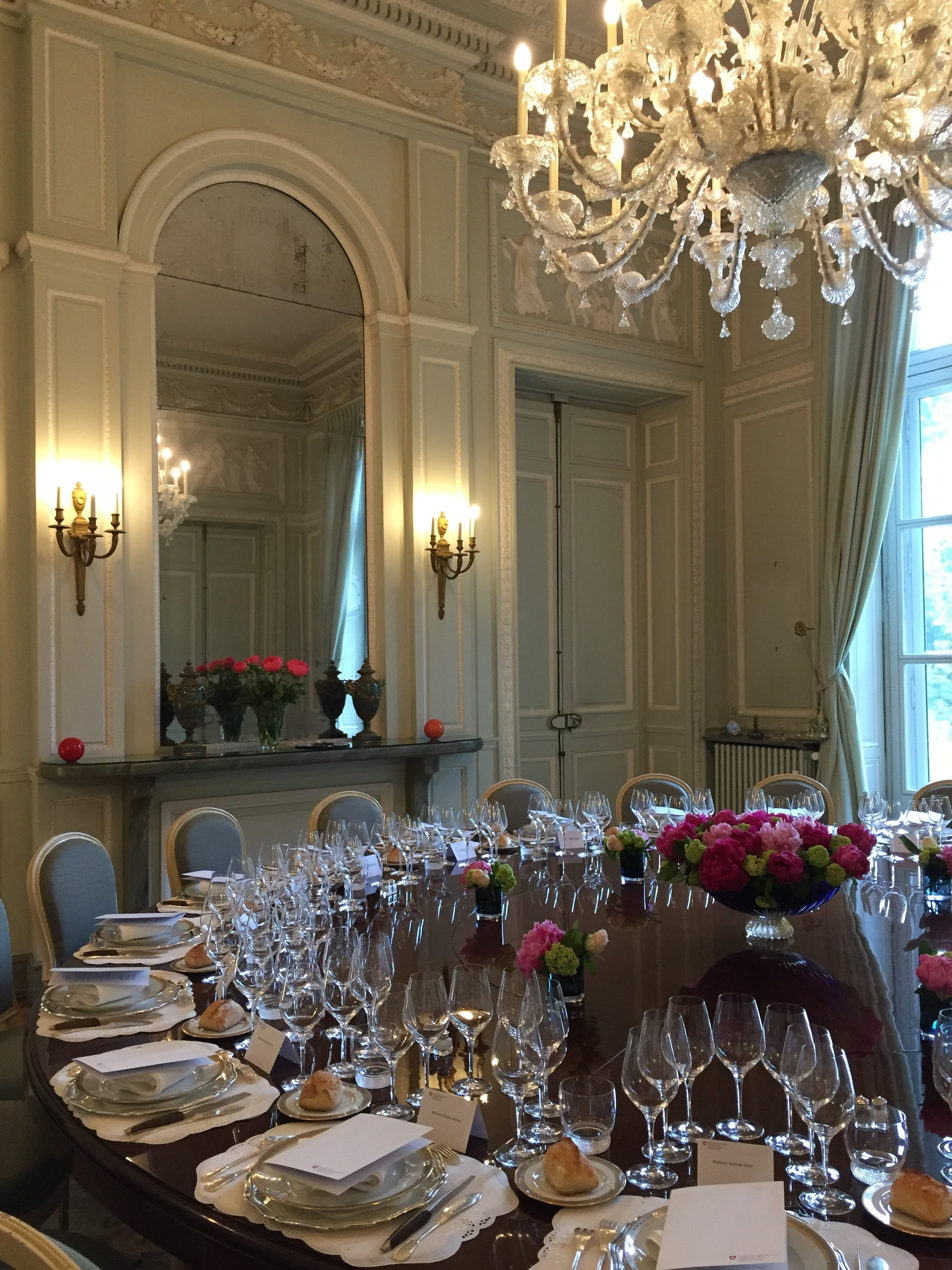
The dining room of the Hôtel de Besenval. It was in 1782, when the architect Alexandre-Théodore Brongniart, commissioned by the Baron de Besenval, transformed the Grand cabinet into what was then a novelty: A dining room in the neoclassical style.

Pierre Victor de Besenval only appeared to his guests briefly that evening. He wasn't feeling well, but was still in the mood to joke. When the guests were already sitting at the table in the dining room, the baron appeared, wrapped in a white cloth like the stone statue in Don Juan, and said in a sepulchral voice: "It is the Commandant's shade that comes to visit you." Delighted with his successful joke, the baron greeted his guests before retreating – marked by weakness – to his bedroom, leaning on Victor von Gibelin. The guests, however, were shocked at the sight of the deathly pale and emaciated baron. Victor von Gibelin remained in the presence of Pierre Victor de Besenval, in whose arms the baron died an hour later. The autopsy found the cause of death to be a polyp in the heart.

"He looked like a mere shadow. His sunken, still beautiful face was deathly pale, and his eyes stared unseeing. An hour later, he lay dead in my arms."

— Victor von Gibelin, on the appearance of Pierre Victor de Besenval in the dining room of the Hôtel de Besenval on 2 June 1791 and his death that night

"Le Suisse le plus français qui ait jamais été" (the most French Swiss that ever was), as Charles Augustin Sainte-Beuve once called Pierre Victor, Baron de Besenval, was buried on 6 June 1791 in the church of Saint-Sulpice in Paris, the church of his family's gravesite.

The Solothurn patrician families von Besenval, von Roll and von Gibelin were all related to each other. Victor von Gibelin was therefore related to both Franz Joseph, Baron von Roll von Emmenholz, and Pierre Victor, Baron de Besenval de Brunstatt. He was also related to his comrade Ludwig Robert, Baron von Roll.

Victor von Gibelin owned a portrait of Pierre Victor de Besenval, which he treasured and on the back of which he hand-wrote: "Mort dans mes bras" (died in my arms). The baron's portrait was passed down within the family. In the second half of the 19th century, this portrait was owned by Urs Viktor Vigier von Steinbrugg.

== A European Odyssey with a Royal Audience in Brighton ==
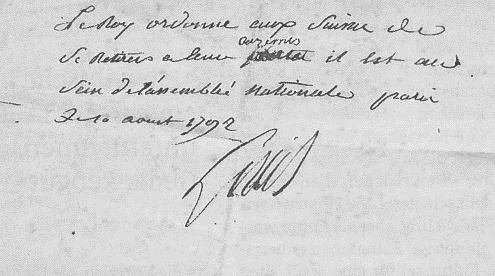
The order to surrender hastily written on a random piece of paper, signed by King Louis XVI. It says: "The king orders the Swiss to withdraw to their barracks. He is in the National Assembly. Paris, 10 August 1792." The royal family was then arrested and the Swiss troops loyal to the king were persecuted. Up to 700 of them were literally slaughtered by the revolutionaries. On 13 August, the royal family was imprisoned in the Tour du Temple. Major Karl Josef von Bachmann, the serving commander of the 900 Swiss Guards at the Palais des Tuileries, was sentenced to death and executed by guillotine on 3 September 1792.

After the disastrous Storming of the Palais des Tuileries on 10 August 1792 and the subsequent hunt by revolutionaries on the Swiss troops loyal to the king, Victor von Gibelin and his comrade Anton von Glutz-Ruchti (1756–1837) hid in various places in Paris. As the situation became more and more dangerous, they fled on 14 September with the help of friends, false passports and a large payment of money to a smuggler from Paris via Dieppe to England, where they arrived shipwrecked in Newhaven at the end of September 1792. On 1 October they travelled on to Brighton, where they were received by the Prince of Wales at the Royal Pavilion. The prince had heard the story of the two shipwrecked officers of the Swiss Guards Regiment and was curious to find out the latest information from revolutionary France. From Brighton they finally reached London.

=== The network of the Swiss Guards ===
In London they met Catherine-Louise, Marquise de Courcelles et de La Suze, née de Santo-Domingo (1757–1826), the former mistress of Pierre Victor, Baron de Besenval de Brunstatt, who in turn was formerly Victor von Gibelin's superior. The Marquise who had also fled France and who, like Victor von Gibelin and Anton von Glutz-Ruchti, was also present at the Baron de Besenval's last supper on 2 June 1791 at the Hôtel de Besenval, helped them to stay in London and to make contact to other French emigrants and the Ambassador of Austria, Johann Philipp von Stadion. Of course, the Ambassador of Austria was interested in news from France since the Queen of France, Marie Antoinette, was an Austrian princess. The ambassador and the emigrants supported the two during their stay in London and during their planned onward journey to the continent.

After a month's stay in London, Victor von Gibelin and Anton von Glutz-Ruchti decided to travel via Dover to Ostend and on to Brussels. Once there, they sought contact with the city's Field Commander, Philippe de Diesbach de Torny (1742–1805), who was a fellow countryman of theirs and the brother of Robert de Diesbach, a comrade killed in the Storming of the Palais des Tuileries on 10 August 1792. The Field Commander, who was Major General and Chamberlain to Emperor Franz II and I, Emperor of Austria and Emperor of the Holy Roman Empire of the German Nation, helped them wherever he could. He welcomed Victor von Gibelin and Anton von Glutz-Ruchti into his house, made his carriage available to them in Brussels and provided them with passports. The two hoped that the Field Commander could help them, that they could join the troops of Charles-Philippe de France, Comte d'Artois. But because the revolutionary French troops were already in front of Mainz, this was not possible, so the two stopped in Koblenz. Finally, with a lot of luck and the help of fellow soldiers in Germany, Victor von Gibelin and Anton von Glutz-Ruchti, endangering their lives as they were pursued by revolutionary troops, arrived via Königstein, Butzbach, Giessen, Marburg, Hersfeld, Nuremberg, Ulm, Stockach to Lenzburg in Switzerland at the beginning of the year 1793. They continued to Schönenwerd, where they visited the brother of Anton von Glutz-Ruchti, Philipp Jacob von Glutz-Ruchti, who was the provost there. Two days later, the two comrades finally reached the city of Solothurn. It was only after his return to Solothurn that Victor von Gibelin learned that King Louis XVI had died under the guillotine on 21 January 1793.

"The king resigned his crown."

— Commentary by Jean Victor, Baron de Constant de Rebecque, Victor von Gibelin's Swiss Guard comrade, in a letter dated 11 August 1792, on the king's order to the Swiss to withdraw on 10 August 1792

== Marriages and honours ==
Victor von Gibelin was married twice. In 1797 his first marriage was to Elisabeth Vigier von Steinbrugg and in 1802 his second marriage was to Maria Cleophe von Sury d'Aspremont. He held several high positions in politics and the military in his hometown of Solothurn, where he died in 1853. Victor von Gibelin was a recipient of the prestigious Order of Saint Louis, which he had received in 1817.
