= Sir George Forestier-Walker, 2nd Baronet =

British soldier

Captain Sir George Forestier-Walker, Bt JP DL
- Born: George Ferdinand Radziwill Walker; 24 May 1825
- Died: 1 August 1896 (aged 71); Wentloog Castle, Monmouth
- Education: Royal Military College, Sandhurst
- Spouse: Hon. Fanny Henrietta Morgan (m. 1854; died 1887)
- Children: 8
- Parent(s): Sir George Walker, 1st Baronet; Helen Caldcleugh
- Relatives: Edward Forestier-Walker (cousin)

Captain Sir George Ferdinand Radziwill Forestier-Walker, 2nd Baronet JP DL (24 May 1825 – 1 August 1896) was a British soldier.

== Early life ==
Walker was born on 24 May 1825, the eldest son of the four sons and two daughters of General Sir George Walker, 1st Baronet, and his second wife, the former Helen Caldcleugh, a daughter of Alexander Caldcleugh.

His paternal grandparents were Major Nathaniel Walker of the Queen's Rangers and Henrietta Bagster, daughter and heiress of Captain John Bagster of the Royal Navy). Through his uncle, General Frederick Nathaniel Walker, he was a first cousin of General Sir Edward Forestier-Walker, who became Commander-in-Chief, Scotland, and married Lady Jane Ogilvy-Grant, a daughter of Francis Ogilvy-Grant, 6th Earl of Seafield).

== Career ==
After being educated at the Royal Military College, Sandhurst, in 1845 he was commissioned as a Lieutenant into the Coldstream Guards and later promoted to Captain. Upon the death of his father on 14 November 1842, he succeeded as the 2nd Walker baronet, of Castleton. He served as a Justice of the Peace and Deputy Lieutenant for Monmouthshire.

In 1893, his surname was changed to Forestier-Walker.

== Personal life ==
On 9 October 1854, he married Fanny Henrietta Morgan (c. 1835–1887), a daughter of Charles Morgan, 1st Baron Tredegar, longtime MP for Brecon, and the former Rosamund Mundy. Together, they were the parents of:

- Sir George Ferdinand Forestier-Walker, 3rd Baronet (1855–1933), who married Georgina Emily Chamberlain, a daughter of Robert Deane Chamberlain, in 1897.
- Radziwill Frederick Forestier-Walker (1856–1934), who married Eva Laura Justice, a daughter of Col. Francis Justice, in 1894. They divorced in 1905.
- Clarence Francis Forestier-Walker (1857–1907), who married Blanche Lancaster Clark, a daughter of George Thomas Clark, in 1891.
- Ivor Augustus Forestier-Walker (1860–1928), who married Georgina Osborne, a daughter of John Osborne, in 1891. After her death in 1910 he married Agnes Maud Mayhew, daughter of Rev. Caleb Baskett Mayhew, in 1912.
- Devereux Philip Forestier-Walker (1864–1936), who married Isabella Constance Dalgety, a daughter of Frederick Dalgety, in 1896.
- Sir Charles Leolin Forestier-Walker, 1st Baronet (1866–1934), an MP for Monmouth who married Alice Blandy-Jenkins, a daughter of Col. John Blandy-Jenkins, in 1894.
- Roland Stuart Forestier-Walker (1871–1938), who married Olive Bassett, a daughter of Ralph Thurstan Bassett, in 1904. They divorced in 1918 and he married Norah Jacintha (née Phipps), Lady Fuller, the widow of Sir John Fuller, 1st Baronet and daughter of Charles N. P. Phipps (MP for Westbury), in 1921.
- Charles Evelyn Forestier-Walker (1875–1931), who married Ada Llewelyn Mansel, a daughter of Col. Robert Henry Mansel, in 1905.

Sir George died at Wentloog Castle, Monmouth, on 1 August 1896.

Baronetage of the United Kingdom
| Preceded by George Townshend Walker | Baronet (of Castleton, Monmouth); 1842–1896 | Succeeded by George Ferdinand Forestier-Walker |
