= Sir George Walker, 1st Baronet =

British Army officer (1764–1842)

General Sir George Walker GCB Bt
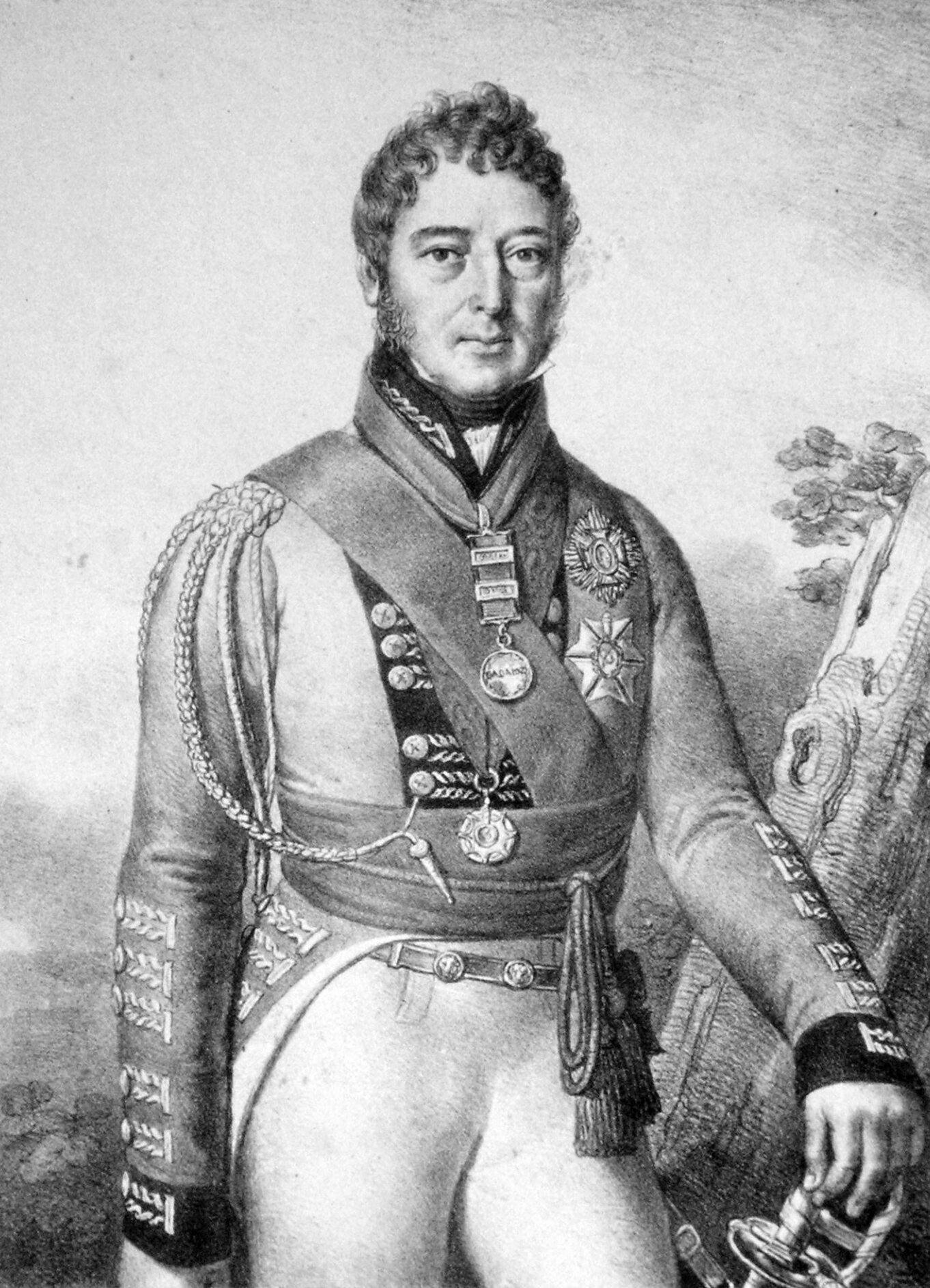
- c. 1820 portrait
- Born: 25 May 1764; Isle of Wight
- Died: 14 November 1842 (aged 78); Royal Hospital Chelsea
- Burial place: Marylebone Church
- Military career
- Allegiance: Great Britain; United Kingdom
- Branch: British Army
- Service years: 1782–1842
- Rank: General
- Commands: 50th Regiment of Foot; 2nd Brigade, 5th Division; 1st Brigade, 2nd Division; 2nd Division; 7th Division; Madras Army
- Conflicts: American War of Independence; French Revolutionary Wars; Flanders campaign; Battle of Tournay; Anglo-Russian invasion of Holland; Napoleonic Wars; Battle of Copenhagen; Walcheren Campaign; Peninsular War; Battle of Roliça; Battle of Vimeiro; Siege of Badajoz; Battle of Nivelle; Battle of the Nive; Battle of Orthez
- Awards: Army Gold Medal; Order of the Tower and Sword (Portugal)
- Other work: Governor of Grenada; Groom of the Bedchamber to the Duke of Sussex; Lieutenant-Governor of the Royal Hospital Chelsea

General Sir George Townshend Walker, 1st Baronet, GCB (25 May 1764 – 14 November 1842) was a British Army officer. He joined the army in 1782, serving with the 36th Regiment of Foot in India in 1784 and as aide de camp to General Thomas Bruce in Ireland in 1787. After being promoted to captain lieutenant, Walker studied in Germany until he was promoted to captain in the 60th Regiment of Foot in 1791. When Britain became involved in the French Revolutionary Wars in 1793, he took a force of volunteers to reinforce the Flanders campaign, where he fought at the Battle of Tournay. While on the continent he helped form Roll's Regiment for British service. He took it to England in 1796, and having been promoted to major he went to serve in Portugal in 1797. Here Walker again served as an aide de camp, to at first Major-General Simon Fraser and then the Prince of Waldeck.

Walker was promoted to lieutenant colonel in 1799 and given command of the 50th Regiment of Foot. After serving as an advisor in the Anglo-Russian invasion of Holland he commanded the regiment in garrisons at Malta and Ireland until 1807 when the regiment fought at the Battle of Copenhagen. Sent to join the Peninsular War, he notably saw action at the Battle of Vimeiro. Later in the year Walker was promoted to colonel and, after a period of leave and independent service, re-joined the 50th in time to fight in the Walcheren Campaign of 1809. He was made a brigadier-general in 1810 and sent to serve as a liaison with the Spanish patriot armies of Galicia and Asturias.

Walker was promoted to major-general in 1811 and given command of a brigade in the 5th Division with which he fought at the Siege of Badajoz in 1812, during which he was badly wounded in a diversionary attack. Walker recovered from his injuries and in 1812 assumed command a brigade in the 2nd Division. As such he fought at the Battle of Nivelle later in the year, and then was appointed temporary commander of the 7th Division. He commanded the division into 1814, fighting at the Battle of the Nive and Battle of Orthez where he was again wounded. After this he returned to his brigade command, only to learn that his wife had died in February. With his wounds worsening, he took the opportunity to resign his command. He later served as Governor of Grenada between 1815 and 1817, and then as Commander-in-Chief, Madras Army, between 1826 and 1831. His last official position was as Lieutenant-Governor, Royal Hospital Chelsea.

== Early life ==
George Townshend Walker was born on the Isle of Wight on 25 May 1764, the eldest child of Major Nathaniel Walker of the Queen's Rangers and Henrietta, the only heir of Captain John Bagster of the Royal Navy. His paternal great-great-grandfather was Sir Walter Walker, advocate to Catherine of Braganza, the wife of King Charles II. He had two younger brothers; Frederick who became a general in the army and Charles who became a post captain in the navy. Walker was educated at Rugby School from 1773. His father, while fighting in the American War of Independence, had him commissioned into the 95th Regiment of Foot as an ensign on 4 March 1782. (Note: Walker's first rank in the 95th is also recorded as second lieutenant.)

== Military career ==
=== Early career ===
Walker was promoted to lieutenant in the 95th on 13 March 1783, serving on Jersey, but the regiment was disbanded on 31 May as part of the cut-downs at the end of the American War of Independence. He instead joined the Second Battalion of the 71st Regiment of Foot on 22 June of the same year; again Walker was unlucky in his choice of regiments, as his battalion was disbanded in October as well. (Note: Walker's second regiment is widely described as the 71st Foot but was at the time actually designated the 73rd Foot.) On 15 March 1784 Walker joined his third regiment in two years, the 36th Regiment of Foot. (Note: McGuigan and Burnham record him joining the 36th in March 1785 instead.) It was stationed in southern India, at which he arrived on 10 March 1785. He was then appointed deputy quartermaster general for the army in the Madras Presidency. In February 1786 he participated in operations against the tax farmers of the Nawab of Arcot, who had previously handed control of taxation in his lands to the East India Company but had attempted to continue taking taxes despite this, at Tinnevelli.

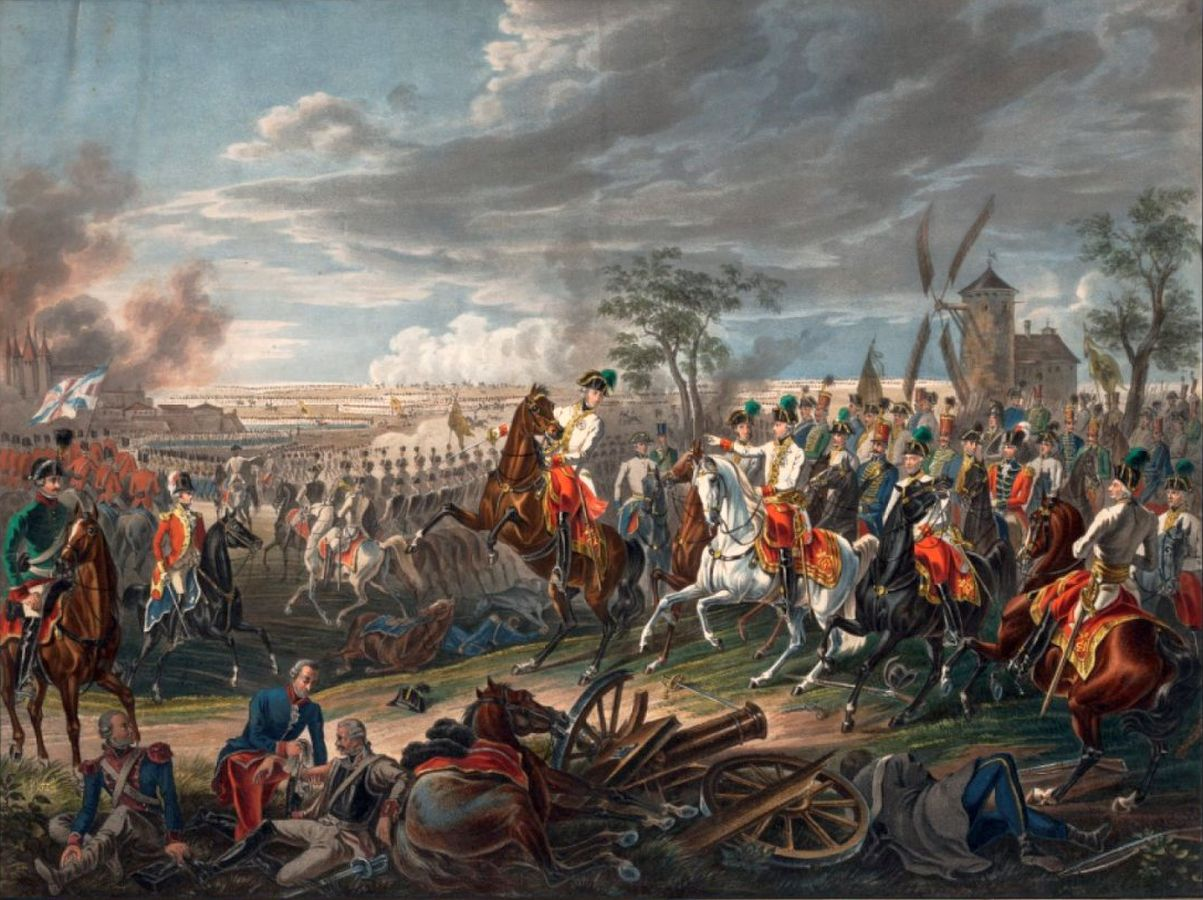
The Battle of Tournay, which Walker fought in

Walker was brought down with jungle fever soon after this and he was invalided home to England in 1787. Being away from his regiment, he chose to transfer to the 35th Regiment of Foot on 25 July 1787 and then from May 1788 served as an aide de camp to General Thomas Bruce, who was a staff officer in Ireland. He transferred regiments again on 13 March 1789, this time to the 14th Regiment of Foot, and was promoted to captain lieutenant. The regiment was serving in Jamaica at the time but Walker chose not to join it there and instead went to study tactics and German in Germany. His regiment returned to England in 1790 and Walker returned to command his company at Hilsea Barracks. Continuing to change regiments to assist his quest for promotion, Walker was promoted to captain in the 60th Regiment of Foot on 4 May 1791. He served at the regiment's depot in England, at the time the rest of the regiment was stationed exclusively in North America, until Britain became involved in the French Revolutionary Wars in February 1793. He then volunteered to go with new recruits to the army of the Duke of York on the Flanders campaign in March, as part of which he fought at the Battle of Tournay on 10 May 1794. After this he was again appointed to the staff of the army's quartermaster general, and he served as such as the army retreated through the Dutch Republic at the end of the year.

=== Regimental command ===
After having been used to fulfil several confidential missions which took him to The Hague, Rotterdam, and Amsterdam, in early 1795 Walker was appointed Inspector of Foreign Corps, for the purpose of which he was sent to south-west Germany and Switzerland. Here he assisted the French royalist officer Louis de Roll in forming Roll's Regiment for service in the British army. When the allied campaign against France began to falter in April 1795 Walker took command of the regiment and took it to Civitavecchia in Italy where they embarked for England in August 1796. He was promoted to major in the 60th on 27 August despite still being detached from them in his role as inspector. In October Spain declared war on Britain and began to threaten Britain's ally Portugal. To assist in defending the country, Roll's Regiment was sent to Lisbon in June 1797, with Walker having gone ahead of it in March. He served as an aide de camp to the second in command of the British army, Major-General Simon Fraser, until June when he was transferred to the staff of the overall Anglo-Portuguese commander, Friedrich Karl August, Prince of Waldeck and Pyrmont.

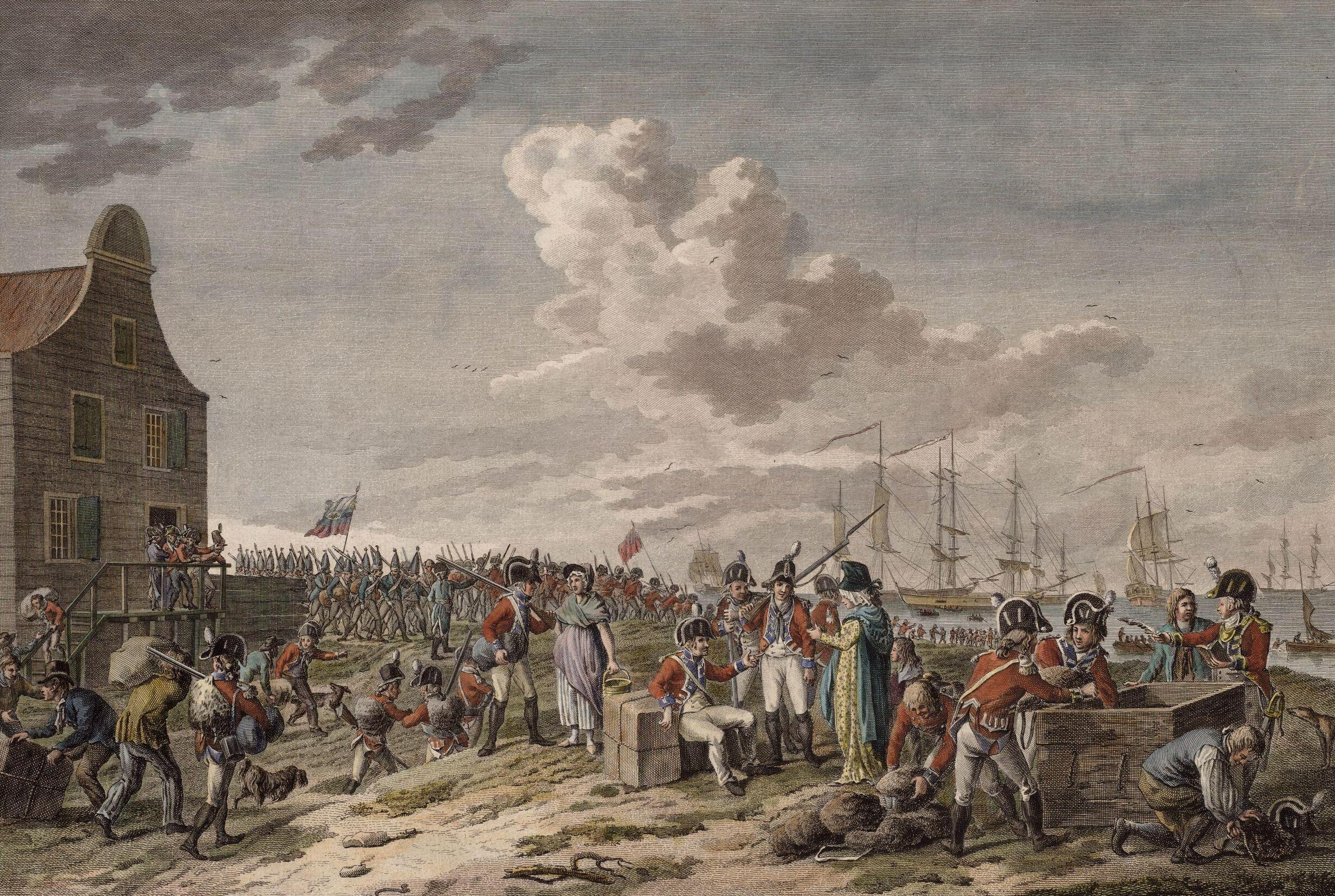
Engraving of the British evacuation from Holland in 1799, which Walker participated in

Later in the same month Walker was again sent home from campaign because of medical issues. He served as an Inspecting Field Officer of Recruiting in Manchester between February 1798 and March 1799, during which time on 6 September he was promoted to lieutenant colonel in the 50th Regiment of Foot. He briefly commanded this regiment in Portugal in early 1799, but was posted to the British military mission assisting the Russians in the Anglo-Russian invasion of Holland in October. Soon after the invasion ended and Walker evacuated with the rest of the army to the Channel Islands. Walker stayed with the Russians until they returned to their homeland in October 1800. He then re-joined the 50th, commanding them as a garrison unit at Malta from August 1801. The regiment moved in May 1802 to serve in Belfast, Ireland, where they assisted in putting down the Irish rebellion of 1803. Walker's next chance to see action did not come until 1807 when the regiment was sent to join a brigade commanded by Brigadier-General Brent Spencer.

This brigade formed part of the army that attacked Copenhagen from August to September. The brigade was not broken up after the Copenhagen campaign, and instead sailed in December to attack naval installations at Cádiz and in the Mediterranean Sea. The brigade's naval transports were upset by constant bad weather as they travelled south, however, and they only reached Gibraltar in March 1808, by which time the opportunity to attack the installations had gone. Walker himself did not make Gibraltar at the same time as the rest of his regiment, as his ship had been separated from the rest of the convoy and driven all the way to Sicily, and he only learned of his regiment's landing at Gibraltar several weeks after the event, at which point he joined them.

Walker and his regiment were not left idle for long after this, forming part of the army of Lieutenant-General Sir Arthur Wellesley that landed in Portugal on 6 August. He was present at the Battle of Roliça on 16 August but the 50th was in the reserve of the army and did not see action. Their first engagement came in the advance guard of the army at the Battle of Vimeiro four days later; Walker was praised for his conduct during the battle where he turned half of his regiment to respond to a flanking French division that might otherwise have done considerable damage and drove it back down the hill it was attacking. The French unit, numbering around 3–4,000 men, was then forced to retreat 4 miles (6.4 km) with the regiment in chase. For actions such as this, the 50th became one of the most well known regiments in the peninsular army. After the battle Walker went on leave for a while because the 50th did not have enough equipment to continue in the advance of the army and were left as garrison troops in Portugal; during his leave he was promoted to colonel on 25 September. In January 1809, Walker was sent back to Portugal to give some dispatches to Lieutenant-General Sir John Moore, but he arrived two days after Moore had been killed at the Battle of Corunna on 16 January. He took the news of the battle to Lieutenant-General Sir John Cradock, the Lisbon garrison commander, and then returned to England.

He then returned to regular duties with the 50th, forming part of the army that fought in the Walcheren Campaign between August and December, for part of which he commanded a brigade as a staff officer in the garrison forces. Walker was made a brigadier-general in August 1810 to serve as a liaison with the Spanish armies of Galicia and Asturias. He served in this role for around one year and formed a very negative opinion of the Army of Galicia, but thought the Army of Asturias worth supporting by the British. In April 1811 he organised a joint attack by that army and 3,000 British troops on the port of Santona to establish a base for the Royal Navy and a supply point for the Spanish armies. Wellesley, now Lord Wellington, removed the British troops from the expedition and instead used it as a diversion from his manoeuvres around the city of Ciudad Rodrigo.

=== General ===
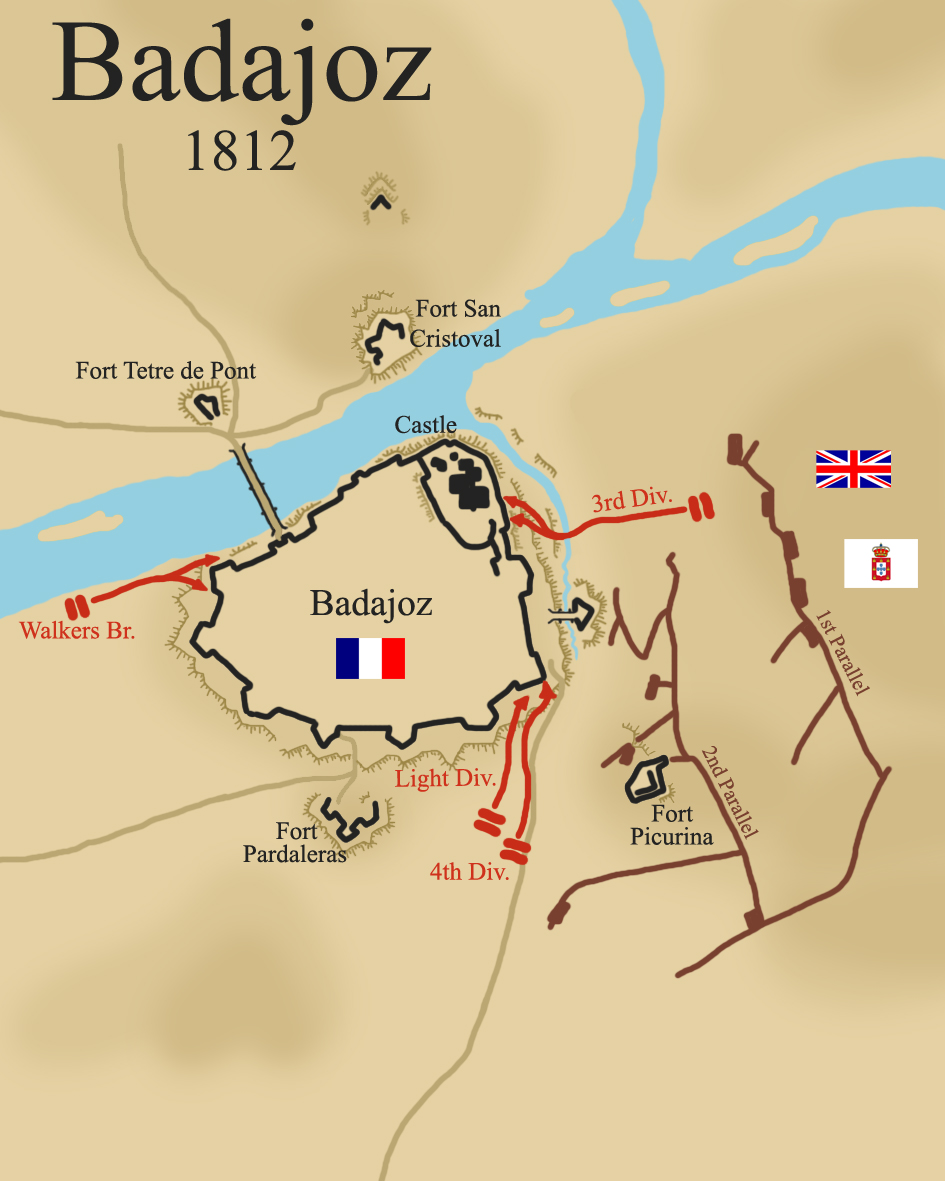
Map of the siege of Badajoz showing the location of Walker's attack on the left

Walker was promoted to major-general on 4 June 1811. The Spanish took Santander on 14 August while he was still working as a liaison. By this time Walker had grown exhausted with the demands and lack of coordination between the Spanish armies, and he successfully applied to Wellington for a regular command in his army. After having briefly served as a staff officer to Wellington, he was given command of the 2nd Brigade of the 5th Division on 2 October.

At the siege of Badajoz on 6 April 1812 his division was called upon to commit a feint attack against one of the city's bastions, and Walker's brigade led them in this attack. The feint was unexpectedly successful and they captured three bastions before retreating in fear that a series of mines were going to be detonated under the walls they had just taken. Walker cajoled his men into continuing the attack despite this, and it would go on to be successful, but soon after he was shot in the chest from very close range by a musket, the bullet of which was deflected by his pocket watch but still entered his body, and then bayoneted four times in the proceeding fighting. The soldier who had bayoneted him ripped his epaulettes off him and prepared to kill him, but Walker was saved by another French soldier because of the masonic signs he had begun to make. The Frenchman cared for him; he survived and was mentioned in dispatches for the action. He lost a great amount of blood and had several ribs broken; it was thought he might die at one point and he was so weak that he was unable to be moved from Badajoz for four months after the fighting had ended. (Note: The wound was seen as a "medical curiosity" by doctors, and before it was closed it was studied and drawn by the surgeon operating on him.) He later found the French soldier who had cared for him in a prisoner of war camp in Edinburgh and rewarded him.

After having been sent home to continue recuperating from his wounds in August, Walker was made colonel of the Regiment de Meuron, a Swiss mercenary unit, on 24 October. He had recovered sufficiently by the beginning of 1813 to return to the Peninsular War, where he was given the 1st Brigade of the 2nd Division on 25 May. He continued recuperating after this and did not physically assume command of the brigade until 4 August. His brigade was made up of the 50th, 71st, and 92nd Regiment of Foot. Prior to Walker's arrival, the army had fought the Battle of the Pyrenees and the 2nd Division's commander, Lieutenant-General William Stewart, had been wounded during this. Walker served as the temporary commander of the division until his return, and then commanded his brigade at the Battle of Nivelle on 10 November. In October the commander of the 7th Division, Lieutenant-General Lord Dalhousie, left the peninsula and on 18 November Walker was appointed as his temporary replacement. He commanded the division at the Battle of the Nive between 10 and 13 December and the Battle of Orthez on 27 February 1814, where he was wounded while leading one of his brigades in an attack and again mentioned in dispatches. Dalhousie took up his command again in March and Walker returned to his brigade.

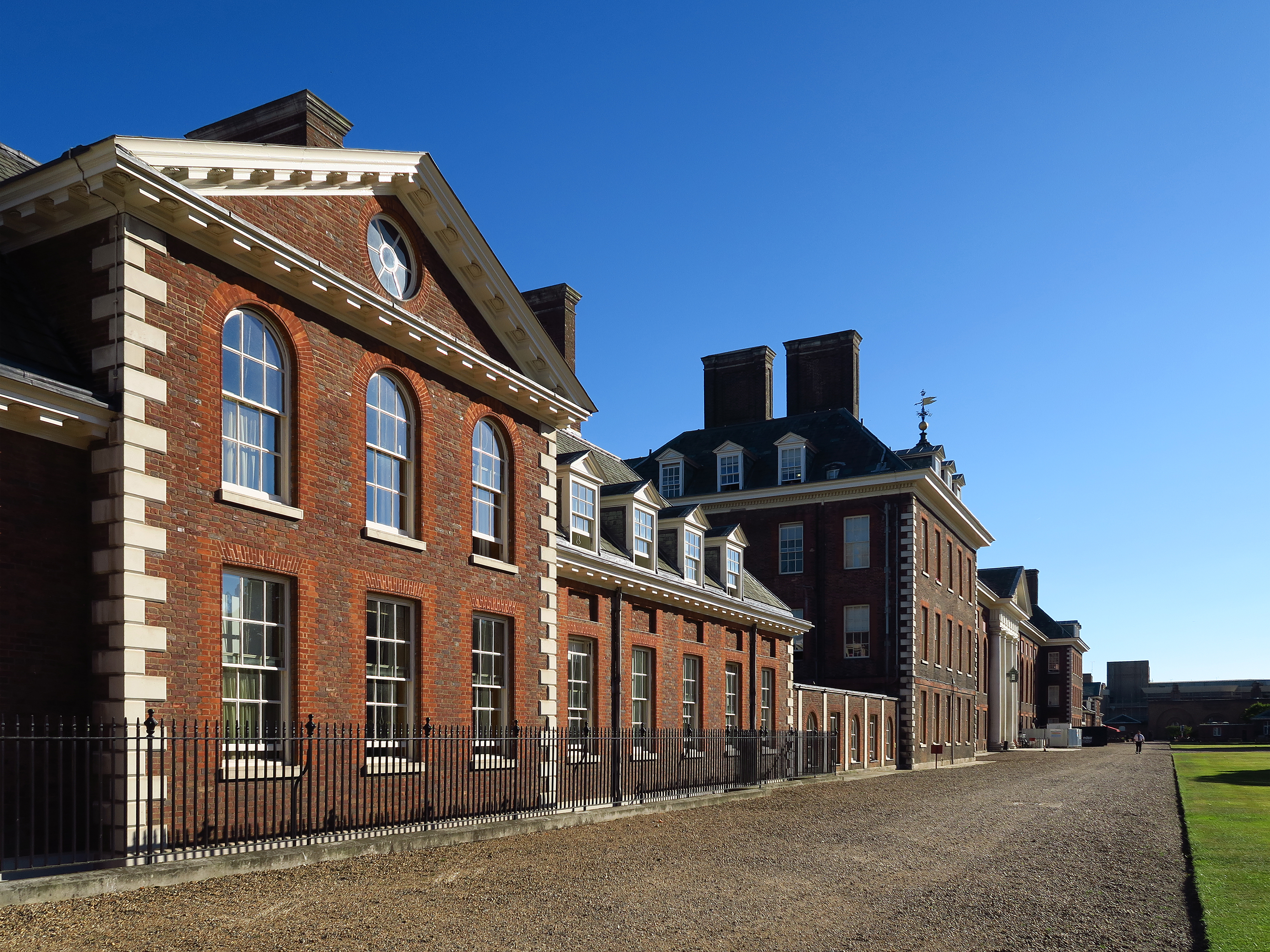
The Royal Hospital Chelsea, which Walker served as lieutenant-governor of from 1837 until his death in 1842

Shortly after this Walker learned that his wife had died on 15 February, and considering the poor state of his existing wounds he decided to leave the peninsular army. This was the end of his active service in the war. For this he was heavily rewarded; he received the Army Gold Medal with three clasps, was made a Knight Commander of the Order of the Tower and Sword, and then in January 1815 was appointed a Knight Commander of the Order of the Bath. When the Regiment de Meuron was disbanded on 21 May 1816 he was instead given the colonelcy of the 3rd Battalion of the Rifle Brigade, and upon that battalion's disbanding in 1818 he was instead given the same regiment's second battalion. Between April 1815 and February 1817 he served as Governor of Grenada and for this he was made a Knight Grand Cross of the Order of the Bath upon his return. In 1817 he also became Groom of the Bedchamber to the Duke of Sussex. On 13 May 1820 he was appointed to another colonelcy, this time of the 84th Regiment of Foot. He was promoted to lieutenant-general on 19 July 1821 and received the colonelcy of the 52nd Regiment of Foot on 19 September 1822.

On 11 May 1825 he was appointed Commander-in-Chief of the Madras Army. Wellington had lobbied heavily for Walker to be given the post, but initially he had been rejected because of his "very bad temper". Wellington persisted in pushing Walker's name forward, and he finally assumed command in India on 3 March 1826. In 1827 Walker put his name forward to become Commander-in-Chief of the Bengal Army which would have made him Commander-in-Chief, India, but this post was instead given to Lord Dalhousie. Walker commanded at Madras until 11 May 1831. He was again rewarded for his service when he was made a baronet on 28 March 1835. He became Lieutenant-Governor of the Royal Hospital Chelsea on 24 May 1837 and was promoted to general on 28 June 1838. On 23 December 1839 he was given the colonelcy of his old regiment the 50th.

Walker died at his house in the grounds of the Royal Hospital Chelsea on 14 November 1842, aged seventy-eight. He was buried at Kensal Green Cemetery but was reinterred at Marylebone Church in December 1859.

== Personal life ==
Walker was a poor man throughout his career, widely known to be existing totally on his pay; the military historians Robert Burnham and Ron McGuigan suggest that one of the factors that finally swayed his appointment to the Madras Army was that the extra pay from it would assist him in supporting his family. The primary route of promotion for a British Army officer in the period was through the purchasing of commissions, but with his lack of income this was not a route available to Walker. Unusually he never purchased a single promotion, but was instead appointed to every rank. It has been suggested that his climbing of the ranks was assisted by an unknown benefactor, perhaps a member of the Royal Family; his father was given an apartment at Hampton Court Palace upon his retirement and Walker's initial appointment to the 95th was brought about by Queen Charlotte.

Walker was known to be personally brave, as seen at Vimeiro and Badajoz, but was less well-liked for his command of units outside of battle. He was a strict disciplinarian and his long periods on the staff instead of in regimental duties in his early career may have been the cause of this. One officer who served in the 50th said of him that he was:

"endued with extraordinary coolness and intrepidity of mind, knew right well how to go about his work...with a remarkably handsome set of features, animated by keen expressive eyes, that were full of intelligence and fire."

Walker married Anna Allen, the only daughter of Richard Allen of Bury, Lancashire, in July 1789. Together they had two daughters before her death in 1814:

- Anna Louisa Walker (5 June 1796 – 9 July 1828)
- Harriet Eliza Walker (b. 21 November 1797)

As his second wife he married Helen Caldcleugh, the daughter of Royal Society fellow Alexander Caldcleugh, on 15 August 1820. They had four sons and two daughters:

- Sir George Ferdinand Radziwill Forestier-Walker, 2nd Baronet (24 May 1825 – 1896)
- Ensign George Frederick Arthur Walker (12 January 1827 – 25 May 1845), officer of the 43rd Regiment of Foot
- Major-General George Edmund Lushington Walker (16 October 1828 – 1893), Royal Engineers officer
- Helen Louisa Adelaide Walker (b. 6 November 1831)
- Anna Matilda Catherine Walker (b. 6 November 1831), married Major-General Sir William Drummond Scrase-Dickins
- Captain George Albert Augustus Walker (28 January 1834 – 1881), Royal Artillery officer

== Notes and citations ==
=== Citations ===
Military offices
Preceded by Pierre-Frederick de Meuron	Colonel of the Regiment de Meuron; 1812–1816	Regiment disbanded
Preceded by Sir William Stewart	Colonel-Commandant of the 3rd Battalion, The Rifle Brigade; 1816–1818	Succeeded by Sir John Oswald
Preceded by Sir William Stewart	Colonel-Commandant of the 2nd Battalion, The Rifle Brigade; 1818–1820	Succeeded by Sir Edward Barnes
Preceded by George Barnard	Colonel of the 84th (York and Lancaster) Regiment of Foot; 1820–1822	Succeeded by Sir Denis Pack
Preceded by Sir Hildebrand Oakes	Colonel of the 52nd (Oxfordshire) Regiment of Foot; 1822–1839	Succeeded by Sir Thomas Arbuthnot
Preceded by Sir Alexander Campbell	C-in-C, Madras Army; 1825–1831	Succeeded by Sir Robert O'Callaghan
Preceded by Sir James Duff	Colonel of the 50th (Queen's Own) Regiment of Foot; 1839–1842	Succeeded by Sir Hudson Lowe
Baronetage of the United Kingdom
New creation	Baronet (of Castleton, Monmouth); 1835–1842	Succeeded by George Forestier-Walker
