= Roll's Regiment =

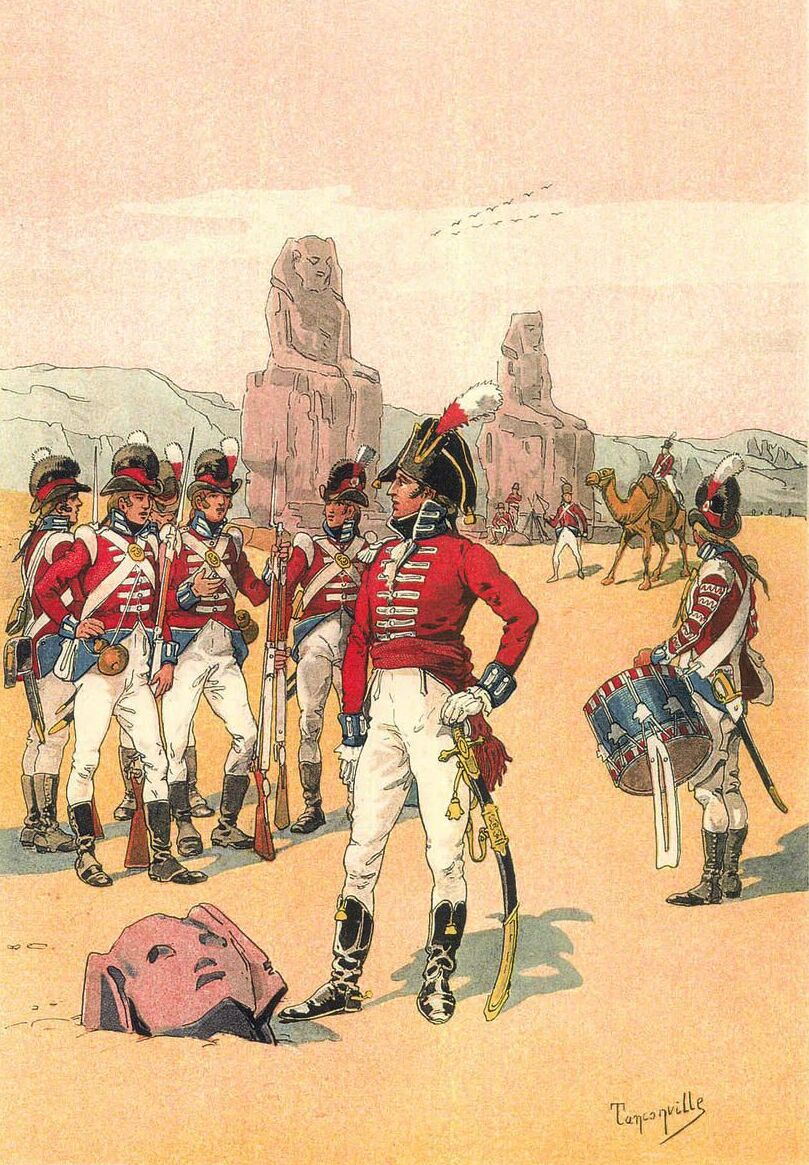
- Regimental troops in Egypt in 1801
- Active: 1794–1815
- Allegiance: Great Britain; United Kingdom
- Type: Line infantry
- Size: One regiment of two battalions
- Colours: Red coats with royal blue facings (sky blue after 1801)
- Engagements: French Revolutionary Wars; Napoleonic Wars

Commanders
- Colonel of the Regiment: Francis de Rottenburg

Roll's Regiment (also known as de Roll's Regiment or von Roll's Regiment) was a line infantry regiment of the British Army. Raised in 1794 for service in the War of the First Coalition, the regiment consisted of Swiss, French and German soldiers.

The regiment's first colonel was Louis de Roll, a former officer of the French Royal Army's Swiss Guards. It served in various garrisons in the Mediterranean and saw action in Tuscany before being reduced to a single battalion. The regiment landed in French-occupied Egypt in 1801 and distinguished itself in action at the Battle of Alexandria. It received drafts of French and Polish prisoners of war to replace its losses and in 1810 participated in the British invasion of the French-controlled Septinsular Republic. The regiment then served in Sicily, guarding Ferdinand IV of Naples.

During the Peninsular War, the regiment participated in the capture of Fort St Felipe (near Tortosa) and the 1813 siege of Tarragona. It was disbanded at Corfu in 1815 following the end of the Napoleonic Wars.

== Formation ==
Louis de Roll, an ex-officer of Louis XVI's Swiss Guards, and his comrade Ludwig von Flüe raised the regiment of two battalions in Switzerland on 9 December 1794. The regiment seems to have formed a part of the British Army but, unlike some other foreign-raised units in British service, it came under the command of British generals, was funded by the British government and appeared on the Army List of 1815.

The regiment was formed of two battalions each of ten companies (including grenadier and light companies) and had an authorised strength of 1,698 men. De Roll, who served as colonel, had requested that the British Army release all Swiss prisoners of war to him for incorporation into the regiment but this was not authorised and most of the men were recruited by traditional means from Switzerland, Alsace and Germany. The uniform was the usual British Army red coat with royal blue facings and silver lace, with the facings being changed to sky blue in 1801. The Colonel of the Regiment was Francis de Rottenburg, Baron Rottenburg.

== French Revolutionary Wars ==
The regiment was stationed in the Anglo-Corsican Kingdom from April to October 1796, prior to the British withdrawal from the island. It was then moved to Elba from which two companies conducted raids on the Tuscan coast in November 1796. Following the evacuation of that island in April 1797 the regiment was sent to Portugal where, in November 1798, it was reduced in strength to a single battalion. The regiment was at Minorca in September 1799 and Gibraltar in October 1800 before it was sent, under General Ralph Abercromby to fight French forces in Egypt.

De Roll then appointed Jost Dürler who, having previously served as a lieutenant-colonel, commanded the rearguard of the Swiss during the defence of the Tuileries, as colonel.

The regiment was engaged at the Battle of Alexandria on 21 March 1801 and performed commendably in action. Some of the officers were awarded the Order of the Crescent by Ottoman Sultan Selim III for their distinguished service. The regiment was accorded the honour of incorporating a sphinx and the Egypt battle honour onto their regimental colour. Dürler was killed at Alexandria and was replaced on 25 September 1802 by Alphonse, Baron de Sonneberg.

The unit remained in Egypt until June 1803 when it returned to Gibraltar. Having suffered around 40% casualties in the Egyptian campaign, Roll's Regiment augmented its strength when some French prisoners of war were recruited into its ranks, including at least 45 Poles.

== Napoleonic Wars ==
Roll's Regiment took part in the British invasion of the French-controlled Septinsular Republic (the Ionian Islands) in 1810 and was then stationed at Sicily guarding Ferdinand IV of Naples until 1812. De Sonneberg had been succeeded as lieutenant-colonel by Frederick, Baron Eben on 7 March 1811.

By 2 June 1813, Roll's regiment was fighting in the Peninsular War, forming a joint battalion with Dillon's Regiment (another foreign regiment in British service). It formed part of Colonel William Prevost's brigade alongside the 67th Regiment of Foot, some artillery and engineers. The regiment captured Fort St Felipe, near Tortosa on 7 June and was present at the unsuccessful Siege of Tarragona (ended 11 June 1813). In April 1814 part of the regiment, amounting to four companies, were formed into a battalion of detachments with Dillon's regiment and the 67th. The regiment returned to Sicily in 1814, where it was reunited with its detachments, and was disbanded at Corfu in 1815.

== Bibliography ==
- Chartrand, René (2013). Émigré and Foreign Troops in British Service (1): 1793–1802. Men-at-Arms 328. Bloomsbury Publishing. ISBN 9781472807199.
- Nafziger, George F.; Gioannini, Marco (2002). The defense of the Napoleonic kingdom of Northern Italy, 1813-1814. Westport, Conn.: Praeger. ISBN 978-0-313-07531-5.
