= Ludwig von Flüe =

Swiss military officer

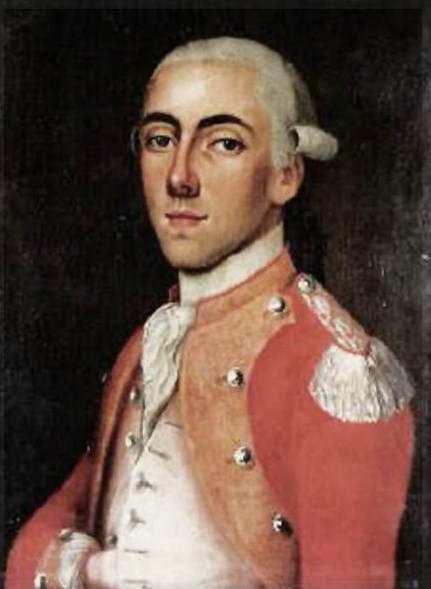
- Ludwig von Flüe in uniform
- Born: 10 March 1752; Sachseln, Obwalden, Switzerland
- Died: 1 April 1817 (aged 65); Sachseln, Obwalden, Switzerland
- Occupation: Military officer
- Spouse(s): Catharina Josepha, née Boulanger (1768 – 25 March 1817), from Rouen
- Parent(s): Johann Wolfgang von Flüe (1691–1754) and Maria Barbara, née Blättler (1709–1792)

Ludwig von Flüe (10 March 1752 – 1 April 1817) was a Swiss mercenary in French service. He was the commanding officer of the Swiss Guards in the defense of the Bastille in July 1789. Because of his role in the Storming of the Bastille during the French Revolution, he was later also known as Ludwig von Flüe le Bastillien.

Ludwig von Flüe wrote a critical report of his experiences during the siege and the Storming of the Bastille on 14 July 1789, entitled: Bericht von der Eroberung der Bastille. His criticism focuses primarily on the behaviour of the Governor of the Bastille, Bernard-René Jourdan, Marquis de Launay, who ultimately paid for it with his life. The report was published in 1790–1791. It was read with interest, especially by the kings and ruling princes of Europe.

== Family ==
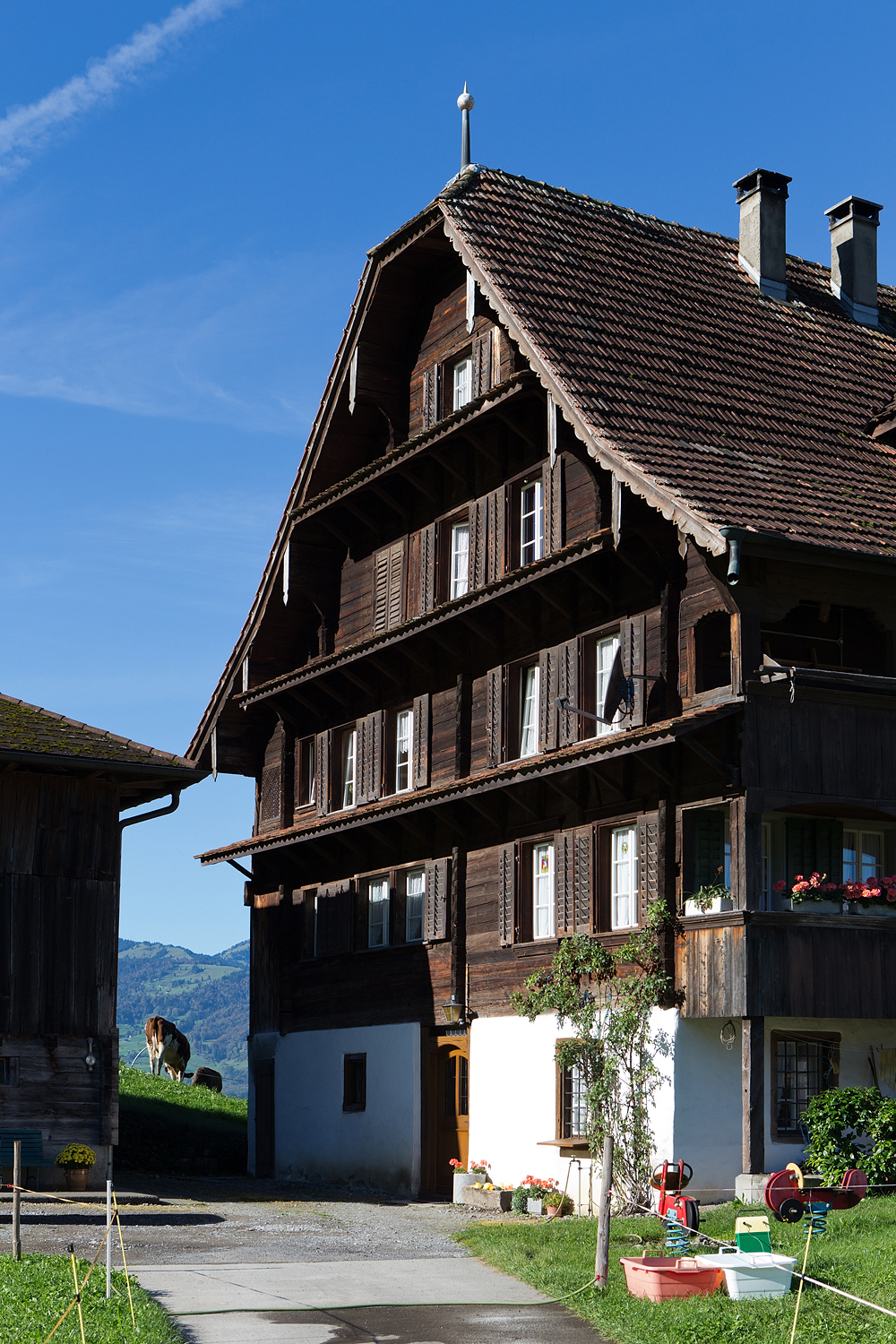
The childhood home of Ludwig von Flüe, the Haus Brunnenmatt in Sachseln.

Ludwig von Flüe was born in Sachseln, in the Canton of Obwalden, as one of three children of the Landammann Johann Wolfgang von Flüe (1691–1754) and his third wife, Marie Barbara, née Blättler (1709–1792), from Kerns. In total, Johann Wolfgang von Flüe had 18 children with his three wives. Ludwig was the second youngest of these 18 children. The Landammann Benedikt Niklaus Ignaz von Flüe (1726–1772) and the Landammann Johann Nikodem von Flüe (1734–1823) were Ludwig's stepbrothers. Other children of Johann Wolfgang von Flüe pursued ecclesiastical careers in the area around Sachseln as well as in other parts of Switzerland, which secured the reputation and influence of the family. However, this was also part of the family tradition, as the family allegedly maintained kinship ties with the family of Niklaus von Flüe. Especially among Catholics, Niklaus von Flüe is considered the patron saint of Switzerland. He was canonized in 1947. Three of Johann Wolfgang von Flüe's daughters became abbesses: At the Monastery of St. Andreas in Sarnen, the Monastery of St. Klara in Stans and the Monastery of Mariazell zu Kalchrain in Hüttwilen. One son became a priest and canon at the College of canons St. Pelagius in Bischofszell.

Ludwig's father died when he was two years old. Therefore, his brothers, especially his brother Benedikt Niklaus Ignaz (1726–1772), took over the education of young Ludwig. Since five of his older brothers had become officers in the service of the King of France, Ludwig's career path was thus almost predetermined.

== Early life and career ==
The Kloster Einsiedeln, where Ludwig von Flüe went to school. The school still exists (18th century engraving).

Ludwig von Flüe was a rather weak child, so from the age of seven his family made him work in the countryside, on the Alp Stossen and the Alp Seefeld, in order to build up his physical strength. The two alpine pastures belonged to Joseph Rohrer, a friend of the family von Flüe.

From autumn 1763 to spring 1766 Ludwig von Flüe attended the monastery school in Einsiedeln. Previously, he had already received three years of private tutoring in Latin and natural sciences. He then moved to France, where he became a sous-lieutenant in his brother Peter's company, the Company von Flüe of the Swiss Guards (issuance of the brevet on 13 August 1766). On 2 May 1779, he was promoted to lieutenant in the same company. On 1 June 1786, Ludwig von Flüe transferred to the Company Ettlin and on 14 December 1788, he transferred to the grenadier company Schaffhauser, each time with the rank of lieutenant. Both companies were units of the Swiss Guards. In June 1789, Ludwig von Flüe joined the Regiment de Salis-Samade as deputy to the Captain.

== Defense of the Bastille ==
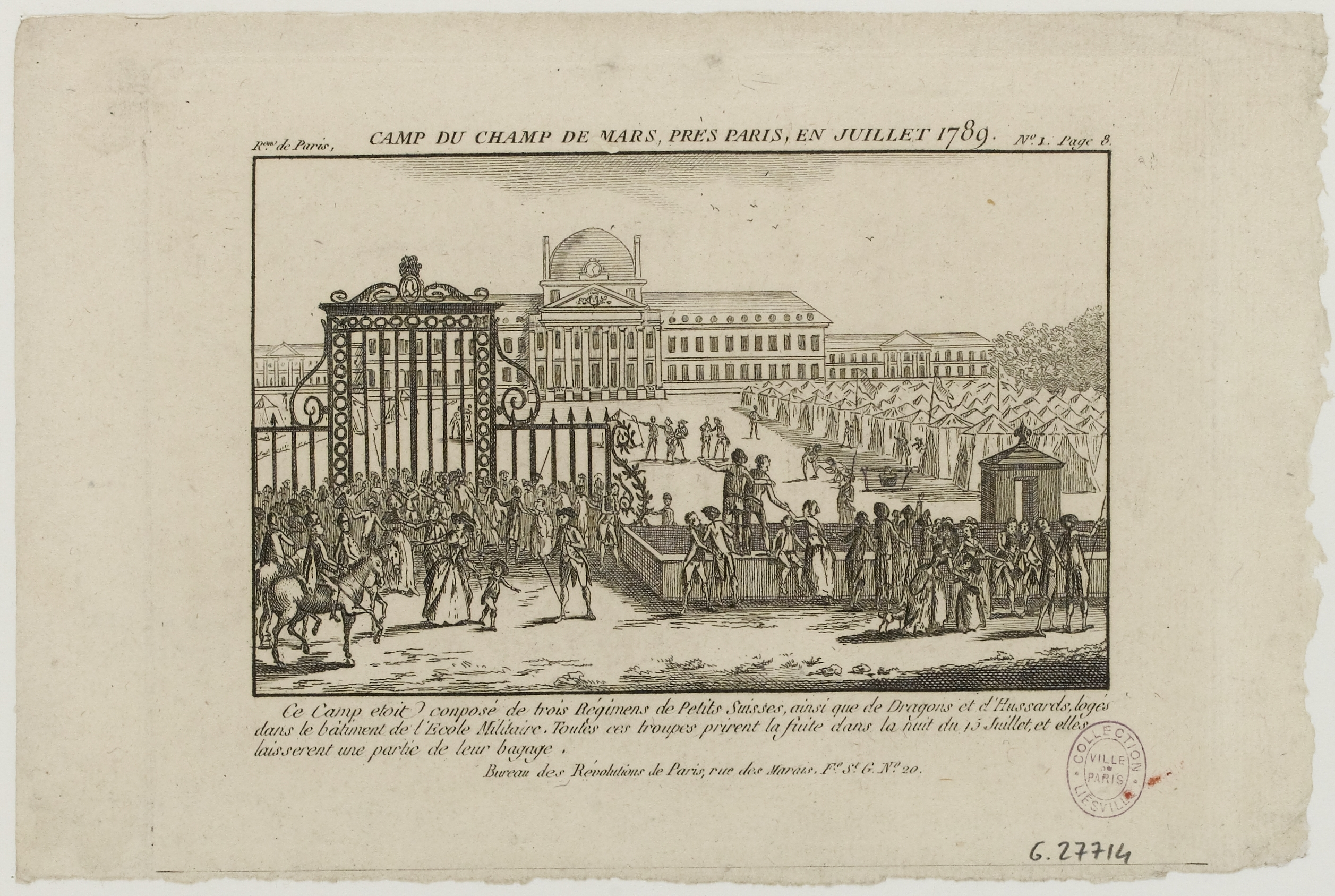
14 July 1789: The Baron de Besenval's troops in the courtyard of the École militaire on the Champ de Mars, consisting of the Swiss Regiments de Diesbach, de Châteauvieux and de Salis-Samade, the latter was the regiment in which Victor von Gibelin and Ludwig von Flüe served at that time, as well as the French Hussar Regiments de Berchény and de Chamborant. After the Taking of the Bastille on 14 July 1789 by the revolutionaries, the baron's troops hastily withdrew on the night of 14 to 15 July.

On 6 July 1789, Ludwig von Flüe received orders from Pierre Victor, Baron de Besenval, Commandant en chef of the troops concentrated in Paris to suppress the riots which had been going on for some time, to go to the Bastille with a detachment of the Regiment de Salis-Samade to reinforce the guards and to ensure the defence of the prison-fortress. The next day, Ludwig von Flüe arrived at the Bastille with 32 soldiers and a sergeant.

On 11 July, King Louis XVI forced the resignation of the only non-noble minister, the Finance Minister Jacques Necker. The king advised Necker to leave the country immediately. However, with this decision the king went a step too far. A step that led to major riots among the population when the news broke on 12 July, as the Genevan banker was especially popular among the common people. His popularity among ordinary Frenchmen stood in sharp contrast to the hostility he often encountered at court, where many aristocrats looked down on the Swiss-born commoner and reformer. In the days that followed, the events came thick and fast. The protests culminated in the riots of 14 July.

On the morning of 14 July, representatives of the Parisian revolutionary militia appeared at the gate of the Bastille. They demanded that the Governor of the Bastille, Bernard-René Jourdan, Marquis de Launay, surrender the prison-fortress to them. This building was considered by the revolutionaries to be the symbol of the repression and oppression by the representatives of the Ancien Régime. According to Ludwig von Flüe, the governor would probably have complied. However, Ludwig von Flüe as well as the entire armed forces staff of the Bastille advised him against this undignified course of action. Consequently, the governor refrained from doing so, at least at this moment.

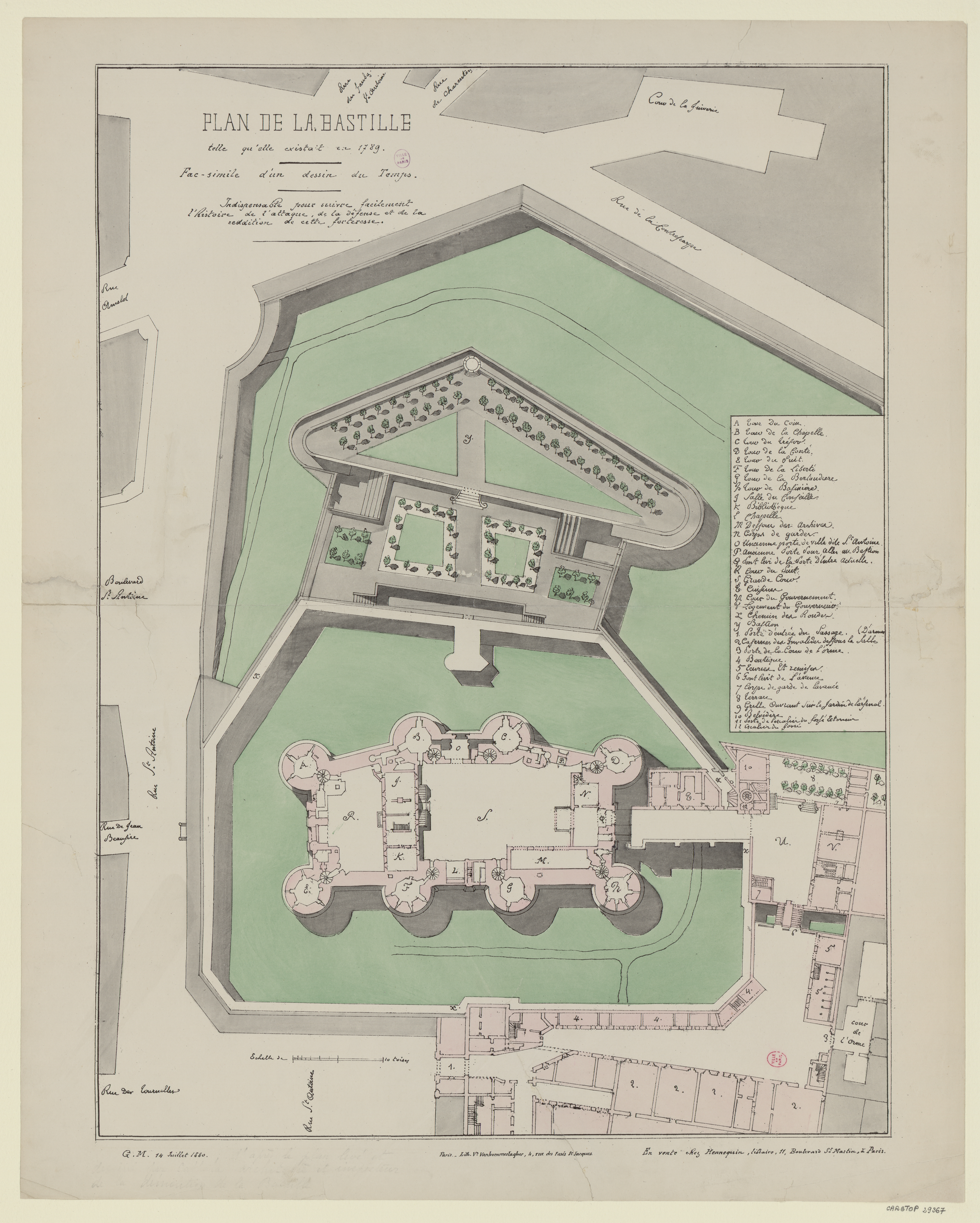
Plan of the Bastille, as it was in 1789. At the fateful afternoon of 14 July 1789, Ludwig von Flüe and his soldiers were stationed in sector "N", the Corps de Gardes. Later that day, they took up positions behind the drawbridge to defend the Bastille.

On the afternoon of 14 July at 3.00 p.m., the Bastille was attacked by the mob of Paris. A large number of armed revolutionaries, along with some defecting members of the French Guards, seized the Bastille's outer courtyards, which the guards had already abandoned the day before. A skirmish lasting several hours ensued. At that time, Ludwig von Flüe and his men were stationed in the quarters of the Corps de Gardes in the inner courtyard of the prison-fortress, next to the gate with the drawbridge. However, the revolutionaries were unable to penetrate the inner courtyard of the Bastille. The brickwork and gates withstood the attacks. And according to Ludwig von Flüe, there had been no danger that the walls and gates would not have withstood any further attacks, at least until reinforcements would have had arrived. The outcome of the nearly three-hour skirmish, according to Ludwig von Flüe's report: On the side of the revolutionaries: 160 dead and wounded. On the side of the Bastille guards: 1 dead and a few wounded. The mob's incursion into the inner courtyard of the Bastille and thus the Taking of the Bastille was only possible when the Governor of the Bastille, Bernard-René Jourdan, Marquis de Launay, later gave the order to lower the drawbridge. An action that Ludwig von Flüe found incomprehensible. And an action from which Ludwig von Flüe tried in vain to dissuade the governor. In his report on the Storming of the Bastille, Ludwig von Flüe noted that the Governor of the Bastille was barely responsive at that moment and seemed to have lost his head from sheer nervousness. Shortly afterwards, Bernard-René Jourdan, Marquis de Launay, would indeed lose his head when he was lynched by an angry mob in the streets of Paris. Following his death, the Marquis de Launay's head was affixed on a pike and paraded through the city.

=== Handover of the letter of capitulation ===
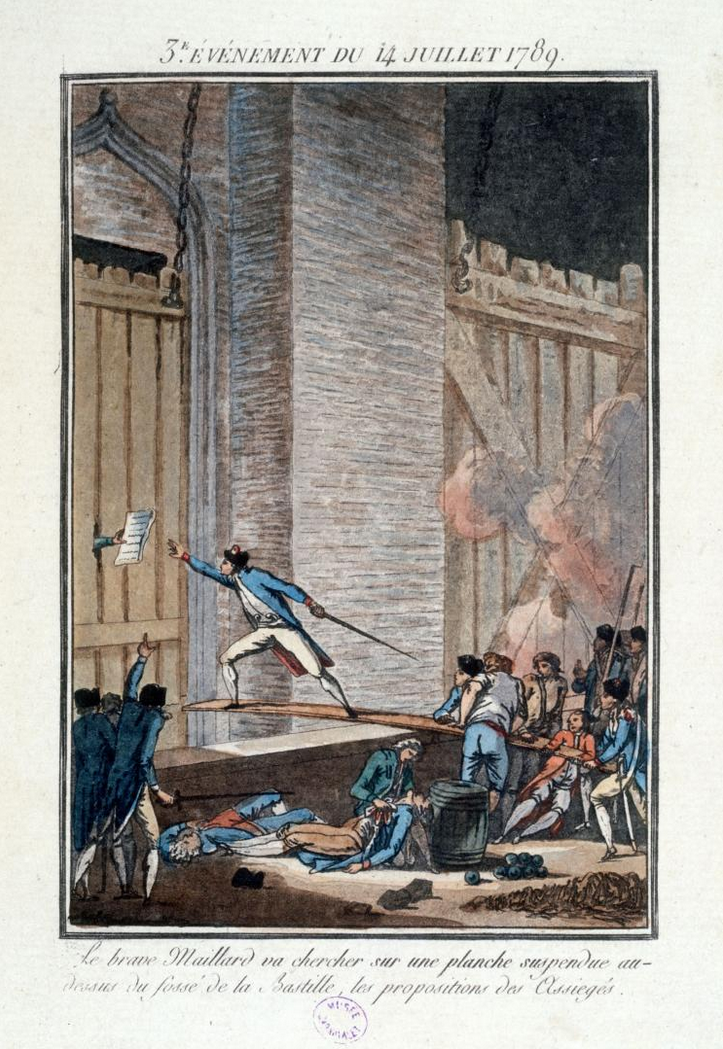
In the late afternoon of 14 July 1789, Ludwig von Flüe handed over the letter of capitulation through one of the two gunholes in the drawbridge to Stanislas-Marie Maillard, who was standing on a plank above the dry moat of the Bastille to fetch the document. After the drawbridge was lowered, he was the first of the revolutionaries to enter the Bastille and confront Ludwig von Flüe.

In the late afternoon of 14 July 1789, on the orders of the Governor of the Bastille, Bernard-René Jourdan, Marquis de Launay, Ludwig von Flüe handed over the letter of capitulation with the governor's demands to Stanislas-Marie Maillard through one of the two holes the Swiss Guards had made in the drawbridge of the Bastille, which were intended to serve as gunholes for two of the three two-pounder artillery guns that were available to Ludwig von Flüe and which were operated by 12 soldiers. For practical and technical reasons, Ludwig von Flüe ultimately decided to position rampart guns there instead. In the letter of capitulation, the Governor of the Bastille threatened that if the revolutionaries did not accept his terms of surrender, he would use the 2,000 centners of gunpowder stored in the Bastille to blow up the prison-fortress and thus the entire surrounding area. In his desperation and helplessness, he threatened nothing less than a suicide squad.

But it was no use. The mood among the revolutionaries had long since become too heated. They thirsted for revenge. The mob kept shouting: "Open the gates and lower the drawbridge!" The governor's demands were not met by the revolutionaries and at 5.30 p.m. the Bastille was stormed, after the Governor of the Bastille, in a panicked reaction, had given the order to lower the drawbridge and to open the gates. The next moment the Bastille was filled with the mob of Paris, who attacked the soldiers, disarmed them and in some cases, such as the Marquis de Launay, massacred them.

"He [Bernard-René Jourdan, Marquis de Launay, Governor of the Bastille] was nevertheless incapable of listening to any proposal, and placed in my hands a note, with orders that it be delivered to the enemy. I transmitted it through one of the openings [gunholes] which I had previously caused to be cut in the drawbridge. This communication was without effect; they [the revolutionaries] refused all proposals of surrender."

— Ludwig von Flüe in his report of his experiences during the siege and the Storming of the Bastille on 14 July 1789

Although the life of Ludwig von Flüe hung by a thread in the aftermath of the Storming of the Bastille, he was freed after many interrogations by the revolutionaries and was able to return to his regiment, which was located in Pontoise at that time, after about 15 days.

=== Aftermath ===
Unlike his comrade Victor von Gibelin, Ludwig von Flüe was not involved in the defense of the Palais des Tuileries on 10 August 1792 in Paris. He and his regiment had been stationed in Rouen since June 1792. Later, the regiment was transferred to Arras, where it was disbanded on 25 September 1792 as part of the general disbandment of the Swiss Regiments. Just four days earlier, on 21 September 1792, the Convention nationale abolished the monarchy and deposed King Louis XVI, who was executed by guillotine on 21 January 1793. The disbanding of the Swiss Regiments followed the Storming of the Palais des Tuileries, where the Swiss Guards had defended King Louis XVI and his family at great cost in lives. Consequently, the revolutionary government no longer trusted the royalist Swiss Guards and Regiments and viewed them as a threat to the revolution.

== Later life ==
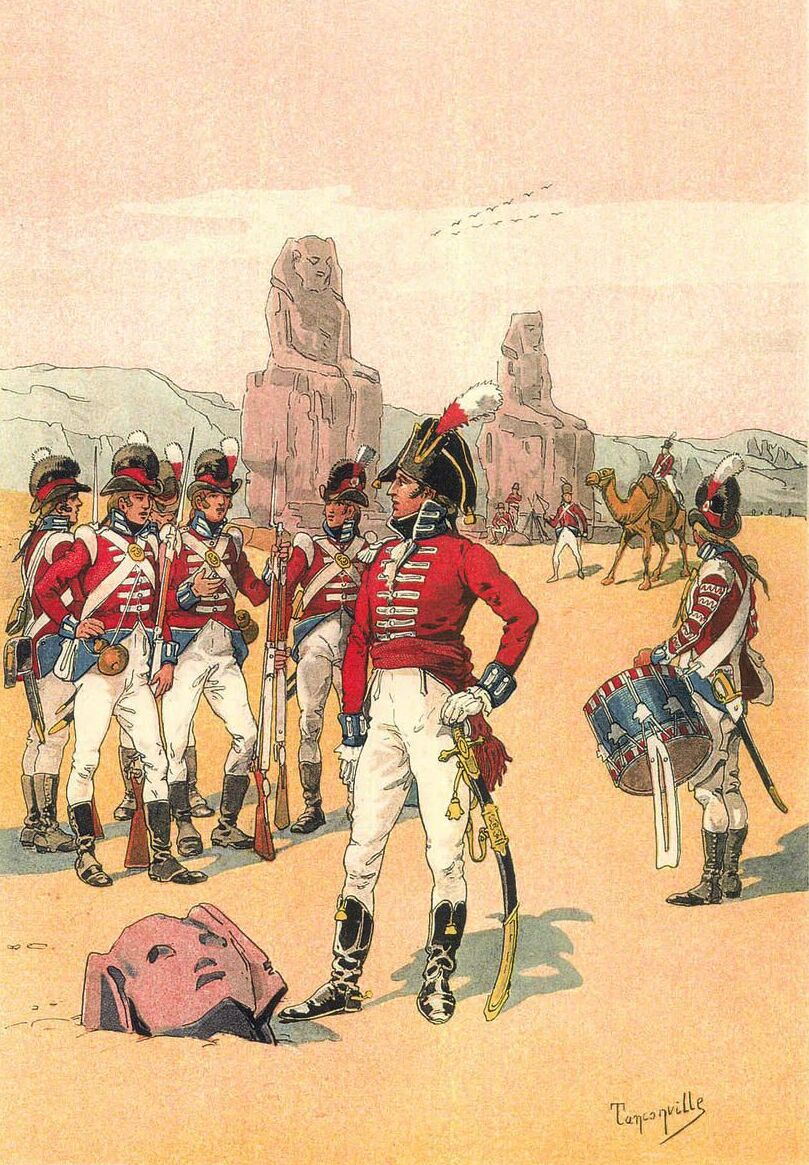
The Regiment de Roll in the Egyptian campaign. The regiment landed in French-occupied Egypt in 1801 and distinguished itself in action at the Battle of Alexandria on 21 March 1801. Revolutionary France viewed with suspicion the fact that the former Swiss mercenaries in French service were now fighting for the British, their enemies in the War of the First Coalition.

After his dismissal from French service following the disbandment of the Swiss Guards on 20 August 1792 in the aftermath of the Storming of the Palais des Tuileries, and the gradual disbandment of all the Swiss Regiments that followed, Ludwig von Flüe married Catharina Josepha Boulanger (1768–1817) of Rouen on 21 January 1793. In the spring of that same year, the couple came to Obwalden to settle family matters. They had several children, all of whom died in childhood.

In 1794, Ludwig von Flüe helped his comrade Louis de Roll to raise the Regiment de Roll, a Swiss mercenary unit in British service, in which he himself served. The formation of the Regiment de Roll did not go unnoticed by revolutionary France. Official protests from François-Marie, Marquis de Barthélemy, the Ambassador of France to the Helvetic Republic, followed. The French still didn't trust the royalist Swiss at all. As a result, the Canton of Zurich, as well as other cantons, prohibited the recruitment of mercenaries. The Canton of Obwalden, however, merely instructed Ludwig von Flüe to proceed more discreetly and not to involve any negotiators. For political and economic reasons, it was in Switzerland's interest to maintain good relations with revolutionary France and not to provoke unnecessarily. Nevertheless, the Regiment de Roll was raised covertly. It was formed of two battalions each of ten companies (including grenadier and light companies) and had an authorised strength of 1,698 men. The oath to the flag was sworn in Villingen at the end of July 1795. In December, the regiment was embarked for the Anglo-Corsican Kingdom. In November 1798, when the regiment was stationed in Portugal, it was reduced in strength to a single battalion. At that time, the regiment had already been severely decimated by shipwreck and disease. It seems that Ludwig von Flüe left the regiment at this time and returned to civilian life in Rouen to be with his wife and her family. The Regiment de Roll was disbanded in Corfu in August 1816 and the remaining Swiss mercenaries returned to Switzerland in the same year.

In 1816, after the Bourbon Restoration, Ludwig von Flüe returned to the service of the King of France, where he served in the rank of captain in the Royal Guard of King Louis XVIII, in the Swiss Regiment de Salis-Zizers, in the second company in the second battalion (two of the eight infantry regiments included in the Royal Guard from 1815 to 1830 were Swiss, number 7 and number 8, and can be regarded as successors to the Swiss Guards of the Ancien Régime). Later that year, on 22 September 1816, he returned to Sachseln to recruit mercenaries. In the spring of the following year, he fell ill and died on 1 April 1817 at the family's manor house in Sachseln, Haus Brunnenmatt (current address: Flüelistrasse 16).

The Haus Brunnenmatt was built in 1750 by Ludwig's father, the Landammann Johann Wolfgang von Flüe (1691–1754). Even today, it is said that the King of France paid for the house. This is true insofar as the family von Flüe owed their wealth to their mercenary business with the Kings of France. Their loyalty to the House of Bourbon paid off, as it did for many other Swiss patrician families of that time.

== Honours ==
Ludwig von Flüe received several awards in connection with his military service to the French royal family, among which the Order of Saint Louis is certainly the most important. It was awarded to him on 10 April 1791.
