= Henri-Pierre Danloux =

French painter (1753–1809)

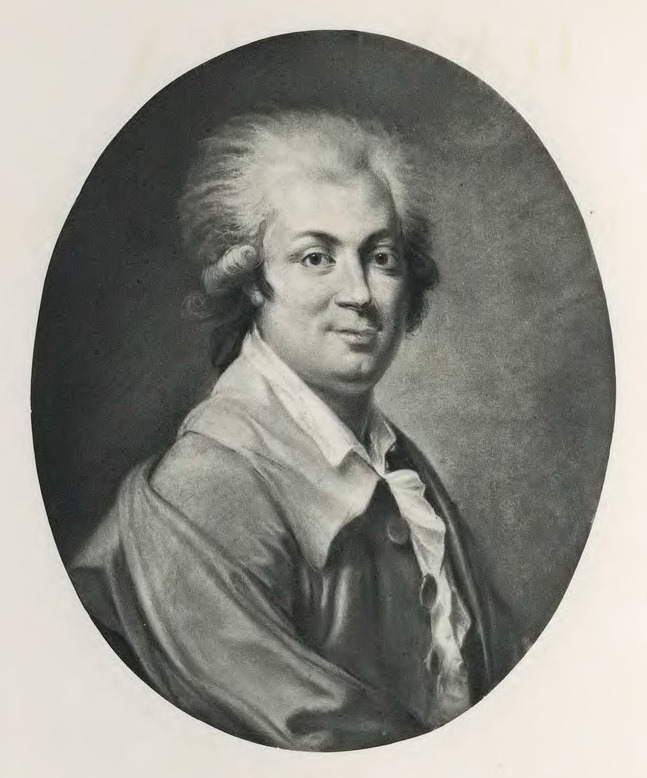
- Born: 24 February 1753; Paris
- Died: 3 January 1809; Paris
- Occupations: Painter, drawer, printmaker

Henri-Pierre Danloux (24 February 1753 – 3 January 1809) was a French painter and draftsman.

He was born in Paris. After the early death of his parents, Danloux was brought up by his architect uncle, Guillaume-Elie Lefoullon. First Danloux was a pupil of Lépicié and later of Vien, whom he followed to Rome in 1775. In 1783, he returned to Lyon and Paris, where he was patroned by the Baronne Mégret de Sérilly d'Etigny, who secured for him a number of important portrait commissions exclusively for the aristocracy. He emigrated to London in 1792 thereby escaping the French Revolution and its potential consequences.

== The years of exile in England and death in Paris ==
While in England, he was commissioned for portraits of the officer class and the well-to-do. Members of one such family, the Lamberts of Oxfordshire, engaged the master in 1800 and had sittings for its individual members: father, mother and son (Henry John Lambert, Bt.), himself, later in life, serving in the Grenadier Regiment of Foot Guards, a Deputy Lieutenant for Oxfordshire and High Sheriff [Peter Lambert from a letter - Pawsey & Payne, 1973]. Danloux, returned to Paris in 1801, there resuming his career. He died in Paris in 1809.

Danloux was influenced by fashionable English portrait painters such as Thomas Lawrence (1769–1830), John Hoppner (1758–1810), and George Romney (1734–1802). In 1793, he exhibited at the Royal Academy in London which resulted in commissions from a number of British patrons.

== Gallery ==
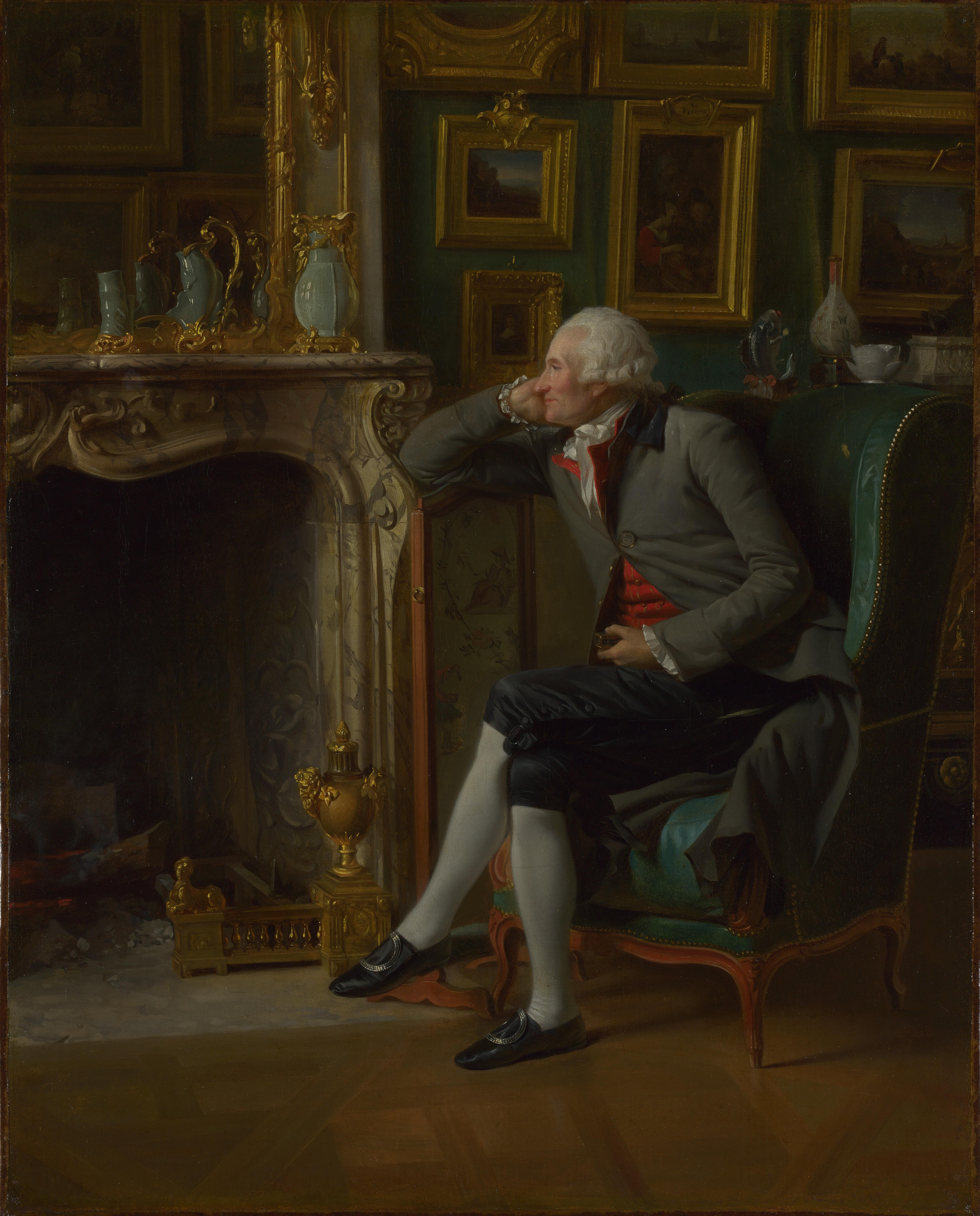
Le Baron de Besenval dans salon de compagnie at the Hôtel de Besenval

Constantia Foster with her nephew, 1790s

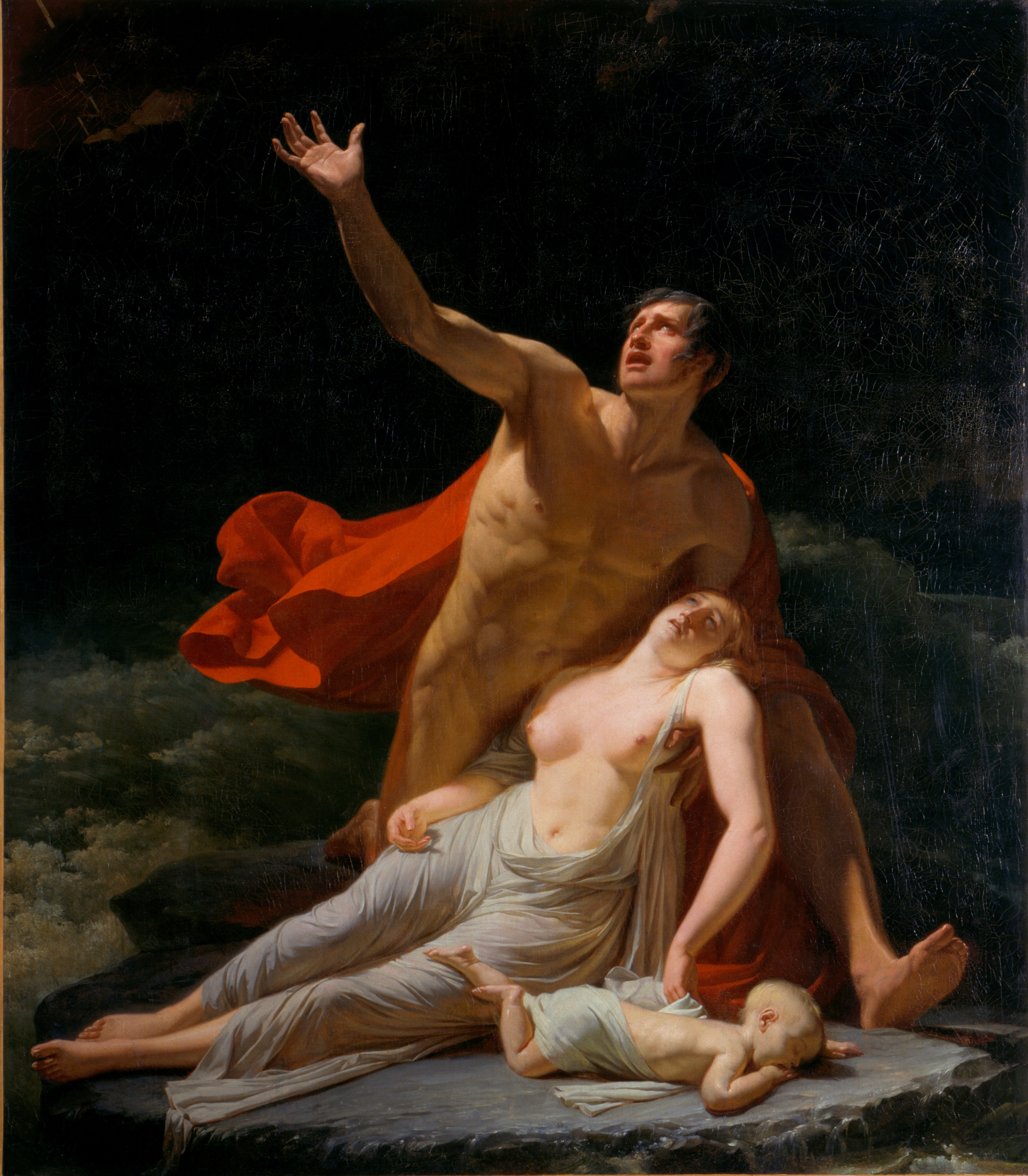
Épisode du Déluge, by Henri-Pierre Danloux (before 1802)

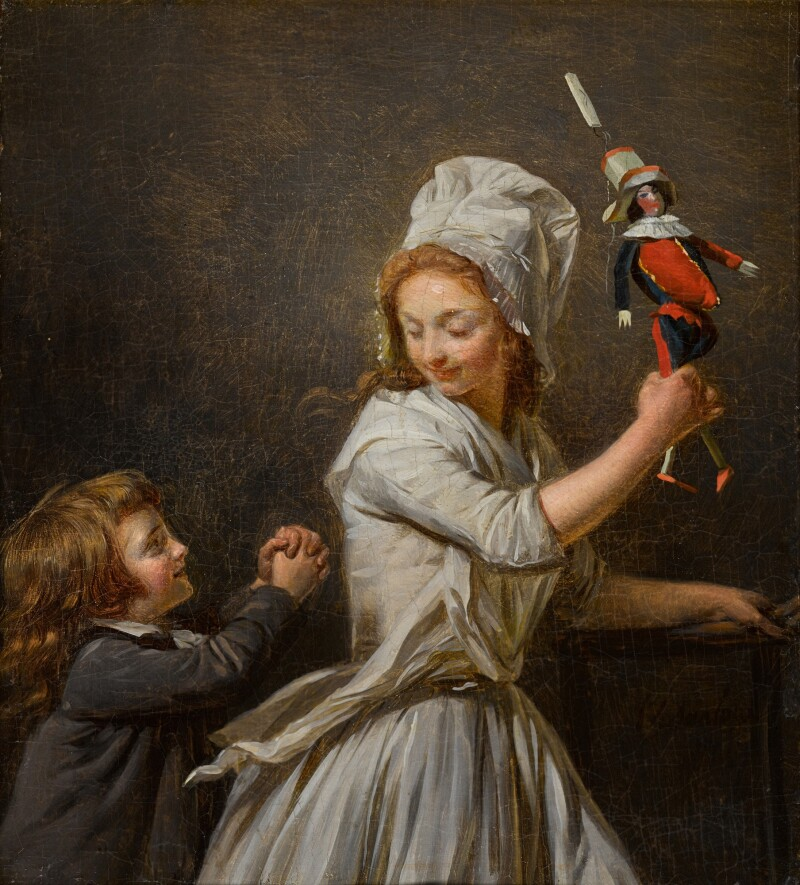
A young boy pleading with his older sister for the return of his Polichinelle puppet, by Henri-Pierre Danloux (between 1770 and 1800)

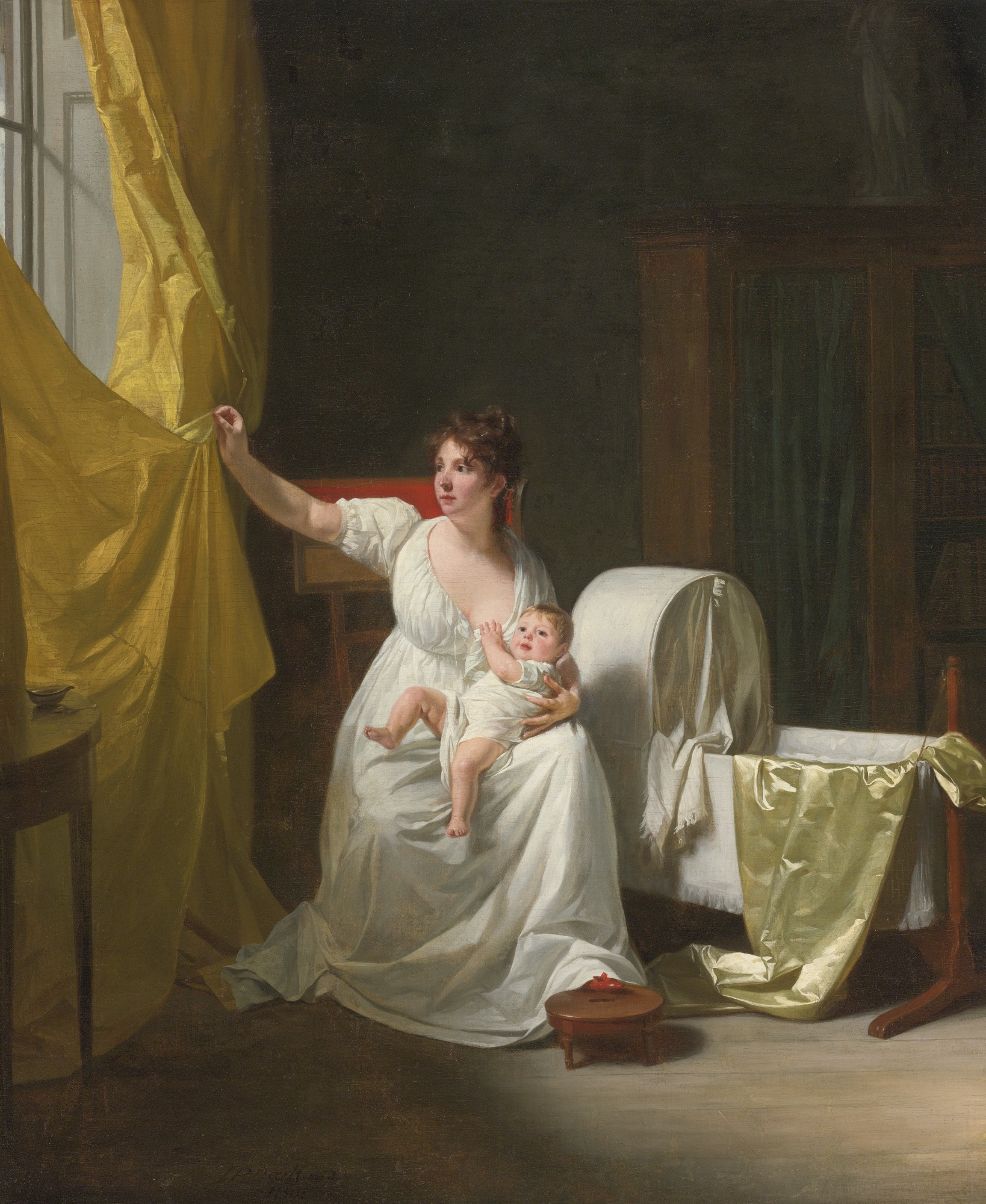
Madame de L'Horme and her son Jean-Louis, by Henri-Pierre Danloux (1801)

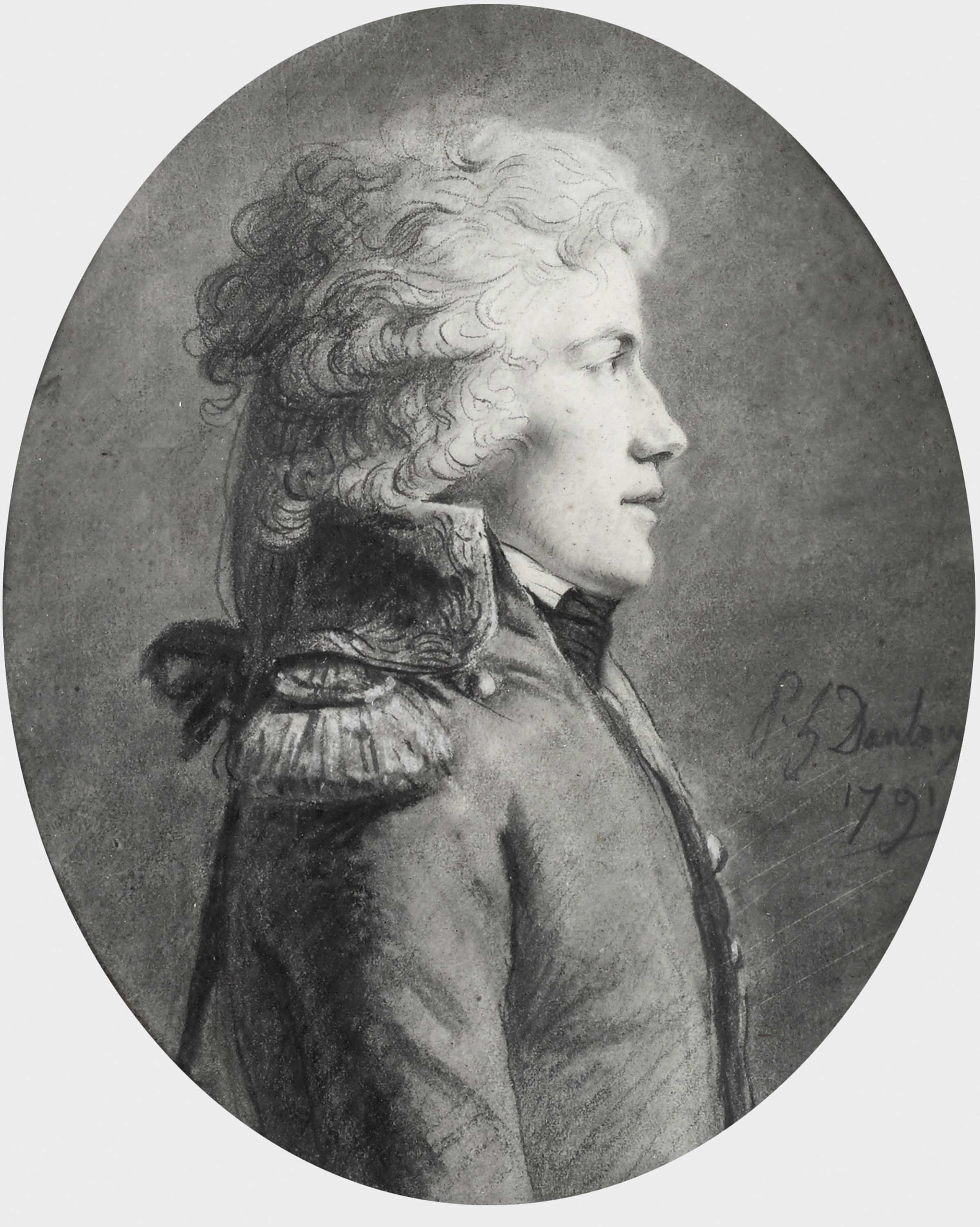
Victor von Gibelin, chalk drawing by Henri-Pierre Danloux, portrayed in Paris in 1791, probably at the Hôtel de Besenval

The actor Thénard in the role of Figaro, 1808, Library-Museum of the Comédie-Française

== See also ==
- The Skating Minister and the attribution controversy: In March 2005, a curator from the Scottish National Portrait Gallery suggested that the painting is by French artist Henri-Pierre Danloux rather than by Henry Raeburn.
