= Alfred Masson-Forestier =

French writer

Alfred Masson-Forestier (1852–1912) was a French writer, born at Le Havre. He studied law and from 1884 to 1899 practiced his profession at Rouen. After 1899 Masson-Fortier settled in Paris and devoted all his time to literature, contributing to the Revue des Deux Mondes, Le Temps, La Revue, etc. His stories, usually short and sober in content, are reminiscent of Mérimée and Maupassant. He wrote:

- Difficile devoir (1879)
- Pour une signature, etc. (1892)
- La Jambe coupée, etc. (1894)
- Remords d'avocat (1896), crowned by the Académie française
- Angoisses de juge, etc. (1898)
- Une flambée d'amour (1900)
- À méme la vie (1901)
- L'Attaque nocturne (1903)

His dramas were:

- Médecin de campagne (1901)
- Attaque nocturne (1905), with André de Lorde
- Baraterie (1905)
- Le Droit du père (1907), with Auguste Monnier

The last years of his life were spent in a study of Racine and he published in 1911 Autour d'un Racine ignoré.
