= Louis de Roll =

Louis de Roll (19 September 1750 – 1813), born Ludwig Robert, Baron von Roll, was a Swiss mercenary active during the French Revolutionary Wars and the Napoleonic Wars. Due to his services to the King of France, his name was Frenchified, which was common practice. In French service he was a comrade of Pierre Victor de Besenval, Victor von Gibelin and Ludwig von Flüe.

== Swiss Guards ==
Louis de Roll, was born on 19 September 1750 and was from Solothurn in the Old Swiss Confederacy. He was in the service of King Louis XVI, as an officer in the Swiss Guards of his Maison Militaire du Roi (Royal Military Household). De Roll held the rank of lieutenant-colonel and was adjutant to the future Charles X of France (then the Count of Artois), the younger brother of the king who served as colonel of the Swiss Guards. Following the start of the French Revolution de Roll left France with Charles to join the Army of Condé, he thus avoided the massacre of his regiment in the Defence of the Tuileries by Republican forces on 10 August 1792. De Roll fought alongside Charles and the Army of Condé in the campaigns of 1792 and 1793 of the War of the First Coalition and was promoted to colonel.

== British Army ==
In 1794 de Roll was asked by the British government to form a regiment of Swiss soldiers for service in the British Army. De Roll was appointed colonel of the regiment which he raised in Switzerland on 9 December 1794. The regiment was formed of two battalions each of ten companies (including grenadier and light companies) and had an authorised strength of 1,698 men. De Roll had requested that the British Army release all Swiss prisoners of war to him for incorporation into the regiment but this was not authorised and instead he recruited most of the men by traditional means in Switzerland, Alsace and Germany. The regiment fought with distinction at the Battle of Alexandria on 21 March 1801. It served in the Ionian Islands, Sicily, Corsica, Portugal, Gibraltar and in the Peninsular War.
