= Forestier-Walker baronets =

Baronetcy in the Baronetage of the United Kingdom

The United Kingdom Walker baronetcy – later Forestier-Walker baronetcy of Castleton in the County of Monmouth, was created on 28 March 1835, for the soldier George Walker. The 2nd Baronet assumed by deed poll the additional surname of Forestier, in 1893.

== Walker, then Forestier-Walker Baronets, of Castleton (1835) ==
- Sir George Townshend Walker, 1st Baronet (1764–1842)
- Sir George Ferdinand Radziwill Forestier-Walker, 2nd Baronet (1825–1896)
- Sir George Ferdinand Forestier-Walker, 3rd Baronet (1855–1933)
- Sir George Ferdinand Forestier-Walker, 4th Baronet (1899–1976)
- Sir Clive Radziwill Forestier-Walker, 5th Baronet (1922–1983)
- Sir Michael Leolin Forestier-Walker, 6th Baronet (born 1949)

The heir apparent to the baronetcy is Joseph Alan Forestier-Walker (born 1992), only son of the 6th Baronet.

== See also ==
- Sir Frederick Forestier-Walker, Governor of Gibraltar

Baronetage of the United Kingdom
| Preceded by Booth baronets | Walker baronets of Castleton; 28 March 1835 | Succeeded by Brisbane baronets |
