= 1944 Berwick-upon-Tweed by-election =

UK parliamentary by-election

← 1941	17 October 1944	1945 →

Constituency of Berwick-upon-Tweed
- Turnout: 24.5%
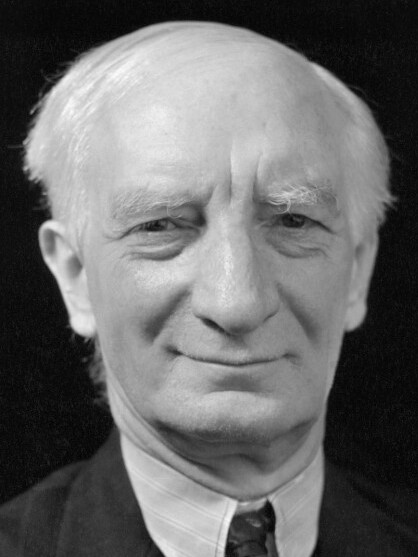

	First party	Second party
Candidate	William Beveridge	W.D. Clark
Party	Liberal	Independent
Popular vote	8,792	1,269
Percentage	87.4%	12.6%
MP before election
George Charles Grey
Liberal
Subsequent MP
William Beveridge
Liberal

The 1944 Berwick-upon-Tweed by-election was a parliamentary by-election held on 17 October 1944 for the UK House of Commons constituency of Berwick-upon-Tweed.

== Previous MP ==
The seat had become vacant when the constituency's Member of Parliament (MP), George Charles Grey, was killed in action. Grey (2 December 1918 – 30 July 1944), the son of a major-general, had joined the British Army in 1938 before the outbreak of the Second World War the following year.

Grey had become the Liberal MP for the constituency, when he was returned unopposed at a by-election on 18 August 1941, to fill a vacancy caused by the elevation to the peerage of the previous Liberal MP.

Between his election and his death, he was the youngest member of the House of Commons, having been elected at the age of 22 years 259 days.

A captain in the 4th Battalion Grenadier Guards, Grey was killed at Le Repas in Normandy, France, on the first day of Operation Bluecoat. He was buried on the battlefield by his men, on the site of which his family later erected a memorial. The site is now recognised as a war grave, designated the Livry Isolated Grave.

== Candidates ==
The election took place during the Second World War. Under an agreement between the Conservative, Labour and Liberal parties; who were participating in a wartime coalition, the party holding a seat would not be opposed by the other two at a by-election. Accordingly, the Liberal Party nominated a candidate, but no Labour or Conservative representative was put forward.

Two candidates were nominated. The list below is set out in descending order of the number of votes received at the by-election.

1. The Liberal Party candidate was Sir William Henry Beveridge (5 March 1879 – 16 March 1963), who was a British economist and social reformer. He is perhaps best known for his 1942 report Social Insurance and Allied Services (known as the Beveridge Report) which served as the basis for the post-World War II Labour government's Welfare State, including especially the National Health Service.

Beveridge was defeated by a Conservative candidate in the 1945 general election. He was created the 1st Baron Beveridge in 1946.

2. William D. Clark, a local farmer, was an Independent candidate.

== Result ==
1944 by-election: Berwick-upon-Tweed
Party	Candidate	Votes	%	±%
Liberal	William Beveridge	8,792	87.4	+36.4
Independent politics	W.D. Clark	1,269	12.6	New
Majority		7,523	74.8	+72.8
Turnout		10,061	24.5	−51.5
Registered electors		41,068		
Liberal hold		Swing		

== See also ==
- Berwick-upon-Tweed constituency
- List of United Kingdom by-elections (1931–1950)
- United Kingdom by-election records

== Bibliography ==
- British Parliamentary Election Results 1918–1949, compiled and edited by F.W.S. Craig (The Macmillan Press, revised edition 1977)
- Who's Who of British Members of Parliament, Volume III 1919–1945, edited by M. Stenton and S. Lees (Harvester Press 1979)
