= Beveridge Report =

Influential 1942 document in the founding of the welfare state in the United Kingdom

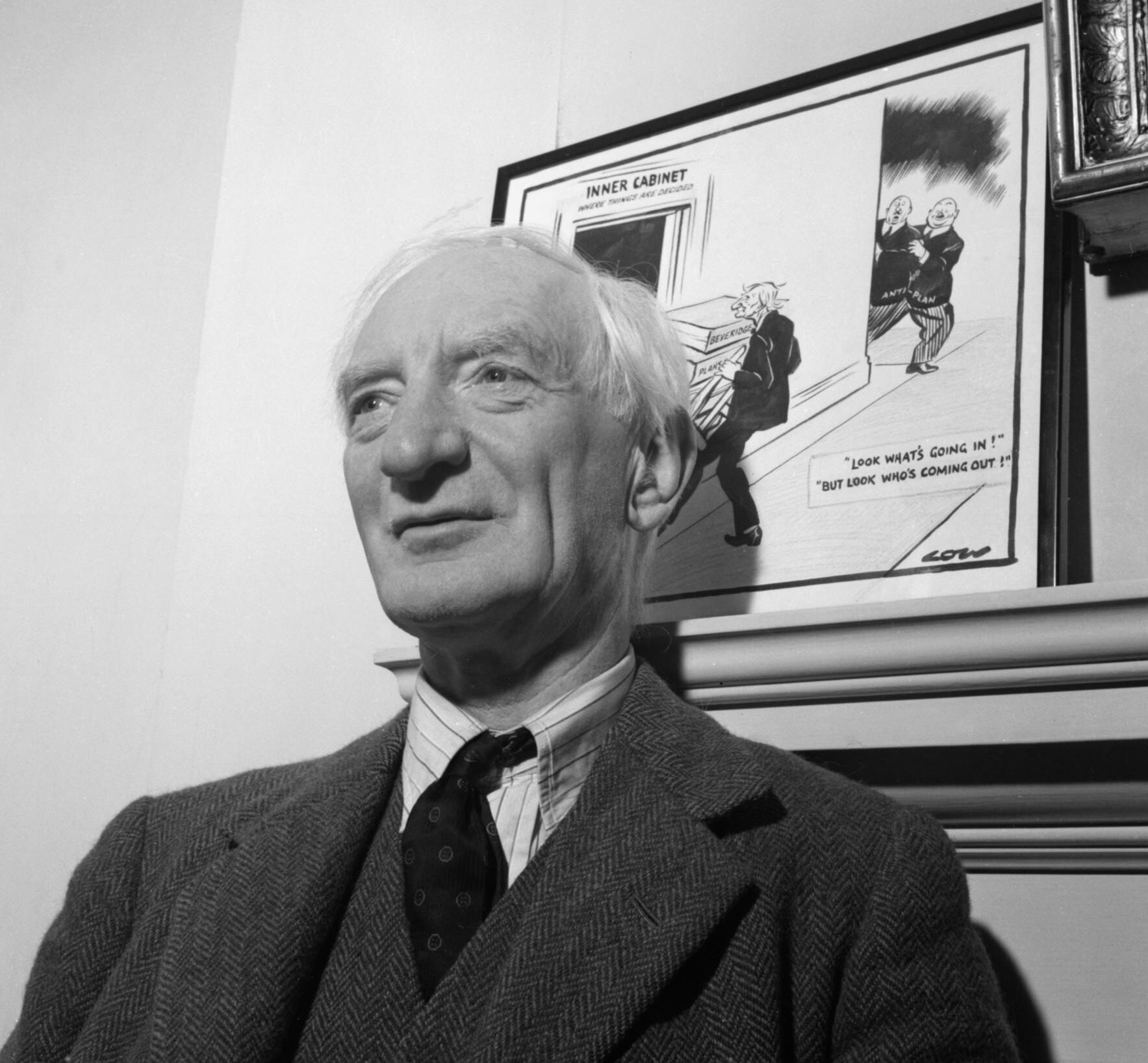
William Beveridge in 1943

The Beveridge Report, officially entitled Social Insurance and Allied Services (Cmd. 6404), is a government report, published in November 1942, influential in the founding of the welfare state in the United Kingdom. It was drafted by the Liberal economist William Beveridge – with research and publicity by mathematician Janet Philip – who proposed widespread reforms to the system of social welfare to address what he identified as "five giants on the road of reconstruction": "Want… Disease, Ignorance, Squalor and Idleness". Published in the midst of World War II, the report promised rewards for everyone's sacrifices. Overwhelmingly popular with the public, it formed the basis for the post-war reforms known as the welfare state, which include the expansion of National Insurance and the creation of the National Health Service.

== Background ==
In 1940, during the Second World War, the Conservative Party entered into a coalition with the Labour Party and the Liberal Party. On 10 June 1941 Arthur Greenwood, a Labour MP and Minister without Portfolio, announced the creation of an inter-departmental committee which would carry out a survey of Britain's social insurance and allied services:

To undertake, with special reference to the inter-relation of the schemes, a survey of the existing national schemes of social insurance and allied services, including workmen's compensation, and to make recommendations.

Its members were civil servants from the Home Office, Ministry of Labour and National Service, Ministry of Pensions, Government Actuary, Ministry of Health, HM Treasury, Reconstruction Secretariat, Board of Customs and Excise, Assistance Board, Department of Health for Scotland, Registry of Friendly Societies and Office of the Industrial Assurance Commissioner.

The report was printed by Alabaster Passmore & Sons Limited, in their Maidstone factory.

== Recommendations ==
The Report offered three guiding principles to its recommendations:

1. Proposals for the future should not be limited by "sectional interests". A "revolutionary moment in the world's history is a time for revolutions, not for patching".
2. Social insurance is only one part of a "comprehensive policy of social progress". The five giants on the road to reconstruction were Want, Disease, Ignorance, Squalor and Idleness.
3. Policies of social security "must be achieved by co-operation between the State and the individual", with the state securing the service and contributions. The state "should not stifle incentive, opportunity, responsibility; in establishing a national minimum, it should leave room and encouragement for voluntary action by each individual to provide more than that minimum for himself and his family".

Beveridge was opposed to "means-tested" benefits. His proposal was for a flat rate universal contribution in exchange for a flat rate universal benefit. Means-testing was intended to play a tiny part because it created high marginal tax rates for the poor (the "poverty trap").

== Reaction ==
On 16 November 1942 inside the Cabinet, Brendan Bracken agreed with Churchill to publish the Report as a Command Paper. The Chancellor of the Exchequer, Sir Kingsley Wood, said that it involved "an impracticable financial commitment" and that publication should therefore be postponed. However, the Cabinet decided on 26 November to publish it on 2 December.

The Ministry of Information Home Intelligence found that the Report had been "welcomed with almost universal approval by people of all shades of opinion and by all sections of the community" and seen as "the first real attempt to put into practice the talk about the new world". In a sample poll taken in the fortnight after the Report's publication, the British Institute of Public Opinion found that 95% of the public had heard of the Report and that there was "great interest in it", but there was criticism that old age pensions were not high enough. They also found that "there was overwhelming agreement that the plan should be put into effect".

The Times called the Report "a momentous document which should and must exercise a profound and immediate influence on the direction of social change in Britain", while The Manchester Guardian described it as "a big and fine thing". The Daily Telegraph said it was a consummation of the revolution begun by Liberal PM David Lloyd George in 1911. The Archbishop of Canterbury, William Temple, said it was "the first time anyone had set out to embody the whole spirit of the Christian ethic in an Act of Parliament".

A Parliamentary debate on the Report was planned for February 1943: the Cabinet appointed the Lord President of the Council, Sir John Anderson, to chair a committee to consider the Report and to set out the government's line. In the Commons debate the government announced they would not implement the Report immediately. The Tory Reform Committee, consisting of 45 Conservative MPs, demanded the founding of a Ministry of Social Security immediately. At the division at the end of the debate, 97 Labour MPs, 11 Independents, 9 Liberals, 3 Independent Labour Party MPs and 1 Communist voted against the government. A Ministry of Information Home Intelligence report found that after the debate the left-wing section of the public were disappointed but that "an approving minority" thought that the government was correct to wait until the post-war financial situation was known before making a decision. An opinion poll by the British Institute of Public Opinion found that 29% were satisfied with the government's attitude to the Report; 47% were dissatisfied; 24% "didn't know".

Winston Churchill gave a broadcast on 21 March 1943 entitled "After the War", where he warned the public not to impose "great new expenditure on the State without any relation to the circumstances which might prevail at the time" and said there would be "a four-year plan" of post-war reconstruction "to cover five or six large measures of a practical character" which would be put to the electorate after the war and implemented by a new government. These measures were "national compulsory insurance for all classes for all purposes from the cradle to the grave"; the abolition of unemployment by government policies which would "exercise a balancing influence upon development which can be turned on or off as circumstances require"; "a broadening field for State ownership and enterprise"; new housing; major reforms to education; and largely expanded health and welfare services. Churchill's commitment to creating a welfare state has been underplayed: he and the Conservative Party supported implementing most of the Beveridge Report, and their 1945 manifesto contained a commitment to create a national health service in the way envisioned by Beveridge as follows: "The health services of the country will be made available to all citizens. Everyone will contribute to the cost, and no one will be denied the attention, the treatment or the appliances he requires because he cannot afford them. We propose to create a comprehensive health service covering the whole range of medical treatment from the general practitioner to the specialist, and from the hospital to convalescence and rehabilitation; and to introduce legislation for this purpose in the new Parliament". However, after they had lost the election the party voted against the founding of the NHS in the form of a giant exclusively state-run enterprise as envisioned by Aneurin Bevan.

== Wartime changes ==
The war years saw great improvements in working conditions and welfare provisions, which paved the way for the postwar UK Welfare State. Infant, child, and maternity services were expanded, while the Official Food Policy Committee (chaired by the deputy PM and Labour leader Clement Attlee) approved grants of fuel and subsidised milk to mothers and to children under the age of five in June 1940. A month later, the Board of Education decided that free school meals should become more widely available. By February 1945, 73% of children received milk in school, compared with 50% in July 1940. Free vaccination against diphtheria was also provided for children at school. In addition, the Town and Country Planning Act 1944 gave consideration to those areas damaged in bombing raids and enabled local authorities to clear slums, while the Housing (Temporary Accommodation) Act passed that same year made £150 million available for the construction of temporary dwellings.

To improve conditions for the elderly, supplementary pensions were introduced in 1940. In 1943, there were further improvements in rates and conditions for those in receipt of supplementary pensions and unemployment assistance. Food prices were stabilised in December 1939, initially as temporary measure, but this was made permanent in August 1940, while both milk and meals were provided at subsidised prices, or free in those cases of real need.

In July 1940, increased Treasury grants led to an improvement in the supply of milk and meals in schools. The number of meals taken doubled within a year, and take-up of school milk increased by 50%. By 1945, 40% of children ate at school compared with just 4% before the war, while those taking milk increased from about 50% to roughly 75%. In 1940, a national milk scheme was launched, which provided a pint of milk at about half price for all children under the age of five, and for expectant or nursing mothers. The take-up rate was such that, by 1944, 95% of those eligible had participated in the scheme. The government's general food policy that priority groups like young children and mothers were not just entitled to essentials like milk, but actually received supplies as well. Evacuation during the course of the war also revealed, to more prosperous Britons, the extent of deprivation in society. Historian Derek Fraser noted that evacuation became "the most important subject in the social history of the war because it revealed, to the whole people, the black spots in its social life."

An Emergency Hospital Service was introduced, which provided free treatment to casualties (a definition which included war evacuees), while rationing led to significant improvements in the diets of poor families. As noted by Richard Titmuss,

The families in that third of the population of Britain who, in 1938, were chronically undernourished, had their first adequate diet in 1940 and 1941…[after which] the incidence of deficiency diseases, and notably infant mortality, dropped dramatically.

== Implementation ==
The Labour Party won the 1945 general election on a platform that promised to address Beveridge's five Giant Evils. (Beveridge himself lost his seat to a Conservative). The report's recommendations were implemented through a series of Acts of Parliament (predominantly the National Insurance Act 1946, the National Assistance Act 1948, and the National Health Service Act 1946) which founded the modern British welfare state. Other related acts included the Family Allowances Act 1945, Pensions (Increase) Act 1947, National Insurance (Industrial Injuries) Act 1946, National Insurance Act 1946, and Landlord and Tenant (Rent Control) Act 1949.

Labour deviated from Beveridge in the state's role: its leaders opposed Beveridge's idea of a National Health Service run through local health centres and regional hospital administrations, preferring a state-run body. Beveridge complained about this: "For Ernest Bevin, with his trade-union background of unskilled workers... social insurance was less important than bargaining about wages." Bevin derided the Beveridge Report as a "Social Ambulance Scheme" and followed the Coalition Government's view that it should not be implemented until the end of the war (he was furious in February 1943 when a large number of Labour back-benchers ignored their leaders and voted against delay in implementing Beveridge).

== See also ==
- Beveridge model
- Bismarck model
- Welfare state in the United Kingdom
- Semashko model
