= 1941 Berwick-upon-Tweed by-election =

UK parliamentary by-election

The 1941 Berwick-upon-Tweed by-election was a parliamentary by-election held on 18 August 1941 for the British House of Commons constituency of Berwick-upon-Tweed.

== Previous MP ==
The seat had become vacant when the constituency's Member of Parliament (MP), Sir Hugh Seely, Bt (2 October 1898 – 1 April 1970), was elevated to the peerage as the 1st Baron Sherwood in July 1941.

Seely had become the Liberal MP for the constituency, when he defeated the previous Conservative MP in the 1935 general election. He had contested East Norfolk in 1922, before becoming its MP 1923 – 1924. He also stood at Kensington South in 1929.

== Candidates ==
The election took place during the Second World War. Under an agreement between the Conservative, Labour and Liberal parties, who were participating in a wartime coalition, the party holding a seat would not be opposed by the other two at a by-election. Accordingly, the Liberal Party nominated a candidate, but neither the Labour nor the Conservative Party put forward a candidate.

As only one candidate was nominated, he was returned unopposed with no poll being necessary.

George Charles Grey (2 December 1918 – 30 July 1944), the son of a major-general, had joined the British Army in 1938 before the outbreak of the Second World War the following year.

Between his election and his death, he was the youngest member of the House of Commons, having been elected at the age of 22 years 259 days.

A captain in the 4th Battalion Grenadier Guards, Grey was killed at Le Repas in Normandy, France, on the first day of Operation Bluecoat. He was buried on the battlefield by his men, on the site of which his family later erected a memorial. The site is now recognised as a war grave, designated the Livry Isolated Grave.

== Result ==
1941 by-election: Berwick-upon-Tweed
Party	Candidate	Votes	%	±%
Liberal	George Charles Grey	Unopposed	N/A	N/A
Liberal hold				

== See also ==
- Berwick-upon-Tweed constituency
- List of United Kingdom by-elections (1931–1950)
- United Kingdom by-election records
