= Health system =

Organization of people, institutions and resources

A health system, health care system, or healthcare system, is a set of organizations, institutions and resources whose primary goal is to produce actions for the promotion, restoration or maintenance of health.

There is a wide variety of health systems around the world, with as many histories and organizational structures as there are countries. Implicitly, countries must design and develop health systems in accordance with their needs and resources, although common elements in virtually all health systems are primary healthcare and public health measures.

In certain countries, the orchestration of health system planning is decentralized, with various stakeholders in the market assuming responsibilities. In contrast, in other regions, a collaborative endeavor exists among governmental entities, labor unions, philanthropic organizations, religious institutions, or other organized bodies, aimed at the meticulous provision of healthcare services tailored to the specific needs of their respective populations. Nevertheless, it is noteworthy that the process of healthcare planning is frequently characterized as an evolutionary progression rather than a revolutionary transformation.

As with other social institutional structures, health systems are likely to reflect the history, culture and economics of the states in which they evolve. These peculiarities bedevil and complicate international comparisons and preclude any universal standard of performance.

== Goals ==
According to the World Health Organization (WHO), the directing and coordinating authority for health within the United Nations system, healthcare systems' goals are good health for the citizens, responsiveness to the expectations of the population, and fair means of funding operations. Progress towards them depends on how systems carry out four vital functions: provision of health care services, resource generation, financing, and stewardship. Other dimensions for the evaluation of health systems include quality, efficiency, acceptability, and equity. They have also been described in the United States as "the five C's": Cost, Coverage, Consistency, Complexity, and Chronic Illness. Also, continuity of health care is a major goal.

== Definition ==
The World Health Organization defines health systems as follows:

A health system consists of all organizations, people and actions whose primary intent is to promote, restore or maintain health. This includes efforts to influence determinants of health as well as more direct health-improving activities. A health system is, therefore, more than the pyramid of publicly owned facilities that deliver personal health services. It includes, for example, a mother caring for a sick child at home; private providers; behaviour change programmes; vector-control campaigns; health insurance organizations; occupational health and safety legislation. It includes inter-sectoral action by health staff, for example, encouraging the ministry of education to promote female education, a well-known determinant of better health.

Some authors have developed arguments to expand the concept of health systems, indicating additional dimensions that should be considered:

- Health systems should not be expressed in terms of their components only, but also of their interrelationships.
- Health systems should include not only the institutional or supply side of the health system but also the population.
- Health systems must be seen in terms of their goals, which include not only health improvement, but also equity, responsiveness to legitimate expectations, respect of dignity, and fair financing, among others.
- Health systems must also be defined in terms of their functions, including the direct provision of services, whether they are medical or public health services, but also "other enabling functions, such as stewardship, financing, and resource generation, including what is probably the most complex of all challenges, the health workforce."

== Health system frameworks ==
There are many ways to understand health systems. All of them are key to help understand their functions and elements, as well as the relationships between them. These frameworks, besides, can serve as guides to analyze and study specific health systems and their performance, in all their complexity.

=== The WHO health system framework ===
In 2000, the World Health Organization proposed a clear health system framework in the annual World Health Report. It featured 4 functions (stewardship, creating resources, financing, and delivering services), together with three objectives (responsiveness, fair financial contribution, and health).

In 2007, this initial model evolved towards the most common health system framework to date: the "building blocks" framework. According to this new model, strengthening health systems consisted of improving six building blocks and the interactions between them, with the aim of improving access, coverage, quality and safety, to ultimately achieve improved health, responsiveness, social and financial risk protection, and improved efficiency.

The six building blocks of a health system, in line with this framework, are:

- Service delivery: Services being offered, demanded by the population and used. It requires adequate infrastructure and management.
- Health workforce: Competent and well-performing health professionals, supported by relevant regulations.
- Health information system: Generation of data about the performance of services and the health status and risks of the population that, in turn, is used for evidence-based decision-making.
- Medicines, supplies, and vaccines: Medical products that are accessible, safe, and of enough quality, thanks to adequate regulatory systems and supply chains.
- Health financing: Resources collected and pooled, used to purchase health services that the population uses.
- Governance and leadership: Stewardship and relationships among authorities, healthcare providers and users that help protect the public interest.

Despite the widespread adoption of this framework, it has also been criticized over the years, due to the apparent segmentation of components, with inadequate emphasis on their relationships, and its limited focus on health services, without enough attention to the community and their role within the health system.

=== The World Bank model ===
The World Bank, in 2004, published a health system framework that, despite not being as widely adopted by the international community, also had a significant impact: the "Control Knobs" model.

In this framework, its authors suggested that action could be taken in five different dimensions or control knobs of the health system: financing, payment, organization, regulation, and behavior. Depending on how these knobs where turned, they would have an effect on the efficiency, quality, and access of the system. Improved performance at this level would help improve health status, customer satisfaction and risk protection, the three performance goals of the health system.

== Financial resources ==
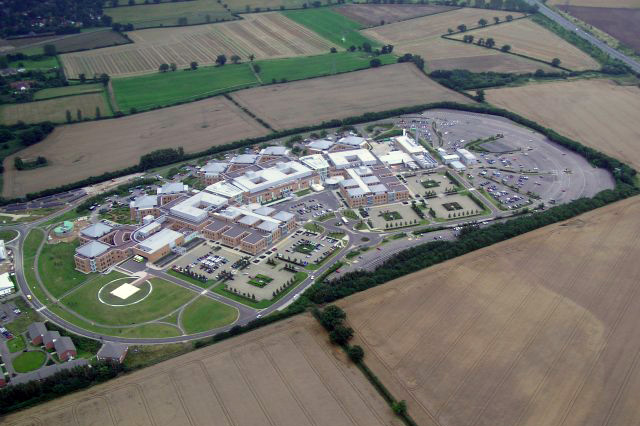
Norfolk and Norwich University Hospital, a National Health Service hospital in the United Kingdom

There are generally five primary methods of funding health systems:

1. general taxation to the state, county or municipality
2. national health insurance
3. voluntary or private health insurance
4. out-of-pocket payments
5. donations to charities

Healthcare models
	Universal		Non-universal	
	Single payer	Multi-payer	Multi-payer	No insurance
Single provider	Beveridge model, Semashko model			
Multiple Providers	National Health Insurance	Bismarck model	Private health insurance	Out-of-pocket

Most countries' systems feature a mix of all five models. One study based on data from the OECD concluded that all types of health care finance "are compatible with" an efficient health system. The study also found no relationship between financing and cost control. Another study examining single payer and multi payer systems in OECD countries found that single payer systems have significantly less hospital beds per 100,000 people than in multi payer systems.

The term health insurance is generally used to describe a form of insurance that pays for medical expenses. It is sometimes used more broadly to include insurance covering disability or long-term nursing or custodial care needs. It may be provided through a social insurance program, or from private insurance companies. It may be obtained on a group basis (e.g., by a firm to cover its employees) or purchased by individual consumers. In each case premiums or taxes protect the insured from high or unexpected health care expenses.

Through the calculation of the comprehensive cost of healthcare expenditures, it becomes feasible to construct a standard financial framework, which may involve mechanisms like monthly premiums or annual taxes. This ensures the availability of funds to cover the healthcare benefits delineated in the insurance agreement. Typically, the administration of these benefits is overseen by a government agency, a nonprofit health fund, or a commercial corporation.

Many commercial health insurers control their costs by restricting the benefits provided, by such means as deductibles, copayments, co-insurance, policy exclusions, and total coverage limits. They will also severely restrict or refuse coverage of pre-existing conditions. Many government systems also have co-payment arrangements but express exclusions are rare or limited because of political pressure. The larger insurance systems may also negotiate fees with providers.

Many forms of social insurance systems control their costs by using the bargaining power of the community they are intended to serve to control costs in the health care delivery system. They may attempt to do so by, for example, negotiating drug prices directly with pharmaceutical companies, negotiating standard fees with the medical profession, or reducing unnecessary health care costs. Social systems sometimes feature contributions related to earnings as part of a system to deliver universal health care, which may or may not also involve the use of commercial and non-commercial insurers. Essentially the wealthier users pay proportionately more into the system to cover the needs of the poorer users who therefore contribute proportionately less. There are usually caps on the contributions of the wealthy and minimum payments that must be made by the insured (often in the form of a minimum contribution, similar to a deductible in commercial insurance models).

In addition to these traditional health care financing methods, some lower income countries and development partners are also implementing non-traditional or innovative financing mechanisms for scaling up delivery and sustainability of health care, such as micro-contributions, public-private partnerships, and market-based financial transaction taxes. For example, as of June 2011, Unitaid had collected more than one billion dollars from 29 member countries, including several from Africa, through an air ticket solidarity levy to expand access to care and treatment for HIV/AIDS, tuberculosis and malaria in 94 countries.

=== Payment models ===
In most countries, wage costs for healthcare practitioners are estimated to represent between 65% and 80% of renewable health system expenditures. There are three ways to pay medical practitioners: fee for service, capitation, and salary. There has been growing interest in blending elements of these systems.

==== Fee-for-service ====
Fee-for-service arrangements pay general practitioners (GPs) based on the service. They are even more widely used for specialists working in ambulatory care.

There are two ways to set fee levels:

- By individual practitioners.
- Central negotiations (as in Japan, Germany, Canada and in France) or hybrid model (such as in Australia, France's sector 2, and New Zealand) where GPs can charge extra fees on top of standardized patient reimbursement rates.

==== Capitation ====
In capitation payment systems, GPs are paid for each patient on their "list", usually with adjustments for factors such as age and gender. According to OECD (Organization for Economic Co-operation and Development), "these systems are used in Italy (with some fees), in all four countries of the United Kingdom (with some fees and allowances for specific services), Austria (with fees for specific services), Denmark (one third of income with remainder fee for service), Ireland (since 1989), the Netherlands (fee-for-service for privately insured patients and public employees) and Sweden (from 1994). Capitation payments have become more frequent in "managed care" environments in the United States."

According to OECD, "capitation systems allow funders to control the overall level of primary health expenditures, and the allocation of funding among GPs is determined by patient registrations". However, under this approach, GPs may register too many patients and under-serve them, select the better risks and refer on patients who could have been treated by the GP directly. Freedom of consumer choice over doctors, coupled with the principle of "money following the patient" may moderate some of these risks. Aside from selection, these problems are likely to be less marked than under salary-type arrangements.'

==== Salary arrangements ====
In several OECD countries, general practitioners (GPs) are employed on salaries for the government. According to OECD, "Salary arrangements allow funders to control primary care costs directly; however, they may lead to under-provision of services (to ease workloads), excessive referrals to secondary providers and lack of attention to the preferences of patients." There has been movement away from this system.

==== Value-based care ====
In recent years, providers have been switching from fee-for-service payment models to a value-based care payment system, where they are compensated for providing value to patients. In this system, providers are given incentives to close gaps in care and provide better quality care for patients.

== Information resources ==
Sound information plays an increasingly critical role in the delivery of modern health care and efficiency of health systems. Health informatics – the intersection of information science, medicine and healthcare – deals with the resources, devices, and methods required to optimize the acquisition and use of information in health and biomedicine. Necessary tools for proper health information coding and management include clinical guidelines, formal medical terminologies, and computers and other information and communication technologies. The kinds of health data processed may include patients' medical records, hospital administration and clinical functions, and human resources information.

The use of health information lies at the root of evidence-based policy and evidence-based management in health care. Increasingly, information and communication technologies are being utilised to improve health systems in developing countries through: the standardisation of health information; computer-aided diagnosis and treatment monitoring; informing population groups on health and treatment.

== Management ==
The management of any health system is typically directed through a set of policies and plans adopted by government, private sector business and other groups in areas such as personal healthcare delivery and financing, pharmaceuticals, health human resources, and public health.

Public health is concerned with threats to the overall health of a community based on population health analysis. The population in question can be as small as a handful of people, or as large as all the inhabitants of several continents (for instance, in the case of a pandemic). Public health is typically divided into epidemiology, biostatistics and health services. Environmental, social, behavioral, and occupational health are also important subfields.

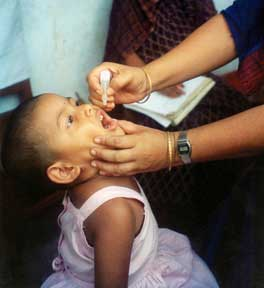
A child being immunized against polio

Today, most governments recognize the importance of public health programs in reducing the incidence of disease, disability, the effects of ageing and health inequities, although public health generally receives significantly less government funding compared with medicine. For example, most countries have a vaccination policy, supporting public health programs in providing vaccinations to promote health. Vaccinations are voluntary in some countries and mandatory in some countries. Some governments pay all or part of the costs for vaccines in a national vaccination schedule.

The rapid emergence of many chronic diseases, which require costly long-term care and treatment, is making many health managers and policy makers re-examine their healthcare delivery practices. An important health issue facing the world currently is HIV/AIDS. Another major public health concern is diabetes. In 2006, according to the World Health Organization, at least 171 million people worldwide had diabetes. Its incidence is increasing rapidly, and it is estimated that by 2030, this number will double. A controversial aspect of public health is the control of tobacco smoking, linked to cancer and other chronic illnesses.

Antibiotic resistance is another major concern, leading to the reemergence of diseases such as tuberculosis. The World Health Organization, for its World Health Day 2011 campaign, called for intensified global commitment to safeguard antibiotics and other antimicrobial medicines for future generations.

== Health systems performance ==
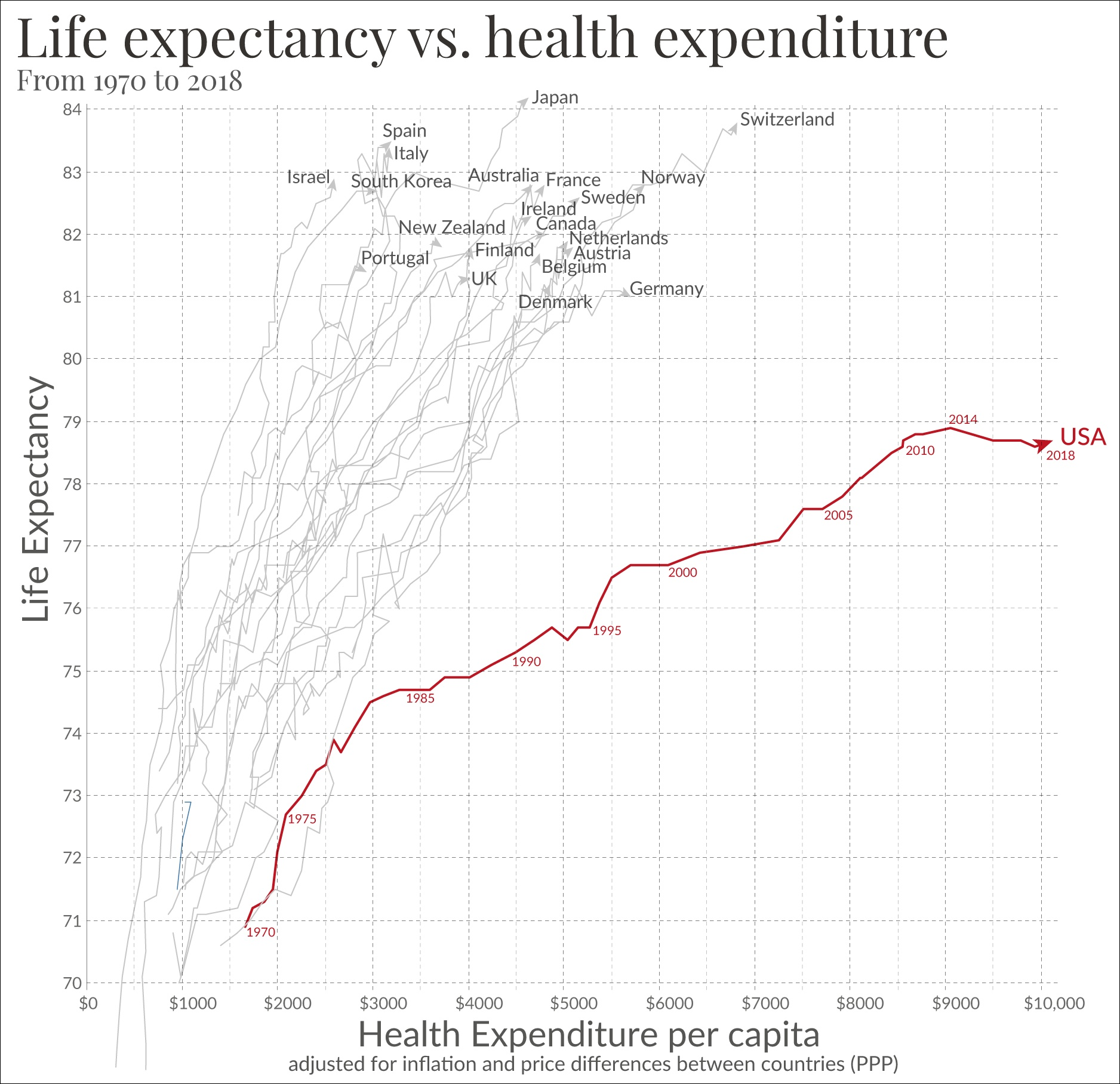
Life expectancy vs healthcare spending of rich OECD countries. US average of $10,447 in 2018.

Since 2000, more and more initiatives have been taken at the international and national levels in order to strengthen national health systems as the core components of the global health system. Having this scope in mind, it is essential to have a clear, and unrestricted, vision of national health systems that might generate further progress in global health. The elaboration and the selection of performance indicators are indeed both highly dependent on the conceptual framework adopted for the evaluation of the health systems performance. Like most social systems, health systems are complex adaptive systems where change does not necessarily follow rigid management models. In complex systems path dependency, emergent properties and other non-linear patterns are seen, which can lead to the development of inappropriate guidelines for developing responsive health systems.

An increasing number of tools and guidelines are being published by international agencies and development partners to assist health system decision-makers to monitor and assess health systems strengthening including human resources development using standard definitions, indicators and measures. In response to a series of papers published in 2012 by members of the World Health Organization's Task Force on Developing Health Systems Guidance, researchers from the Future Health Systems consortium argue that there is insufficient focus on the 'policy implementation gap'. Recognizing the diversity of stakeholders and complexity of health systems is crucial to ensure that evidence-based guidelines are tested with requisite humility and without a rigid adherence to models dominated by a limited number of disciplines. Healthcare services often implement Quality Improvement Initiatives to overcome this policy implementation gap. Although many of these initiatives deliver improved healthcare, a large proportion fail to be sustained. Numerous tools and frameworks have been created to respond to this challenge and increase improvement longevity. One tool highlighted the need for these tools to respond to user preferences and settings to optimize impact.

Health Policy and Systems Research (HPSR) is an emerging multidisciplinary field that challenges 'disciplinary capture' by dominant health research traditions, arguing that these traditions generate premature and inappropriately narrow definitions that impede rather than enhance health systems strengthening. HPSR focuses on low- and middle-income countries and draws on the relativist social science paradigm which recognises that all phenomena are constructed through human behaviour and interpretation. In using this approach, HPSR offers insight into health systems by generating a complex understanding of context in order to enhance health policy learning. HPSR calls for greater involvement of local actors, including policy makers, civil society and researchers, in decisions that are made around funding health policy research and health systems strengthening.

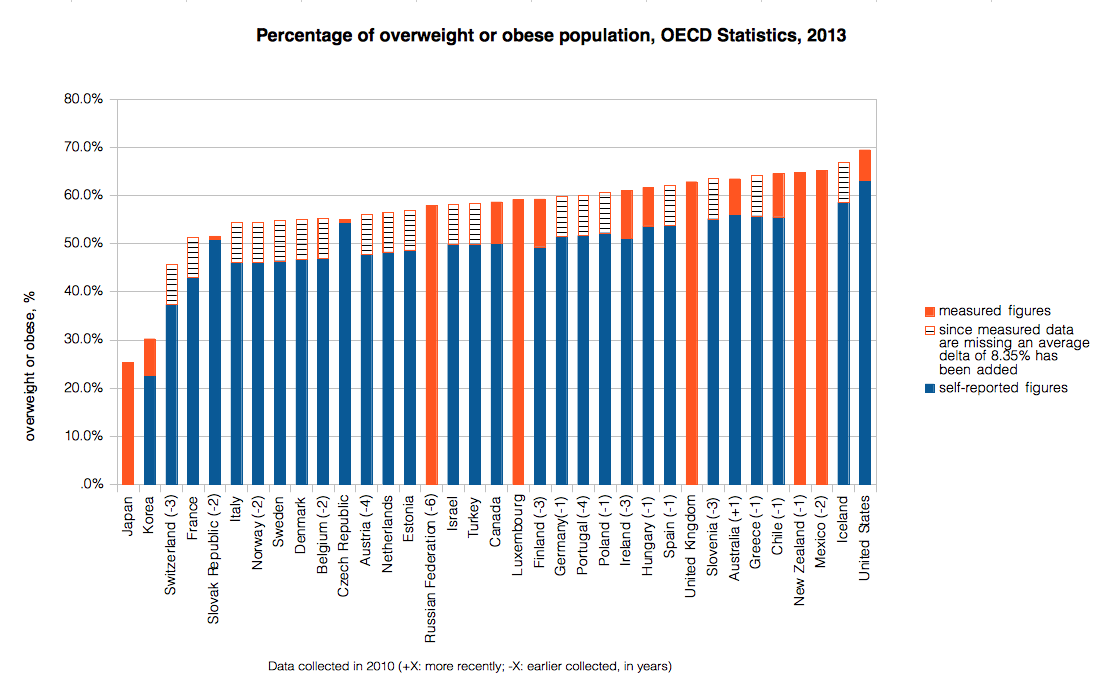
Percentage of overweight or obese population in 2010. Data source: OECD's iLibrary, http://stats.oecd.org, retrieved 2013-12-12

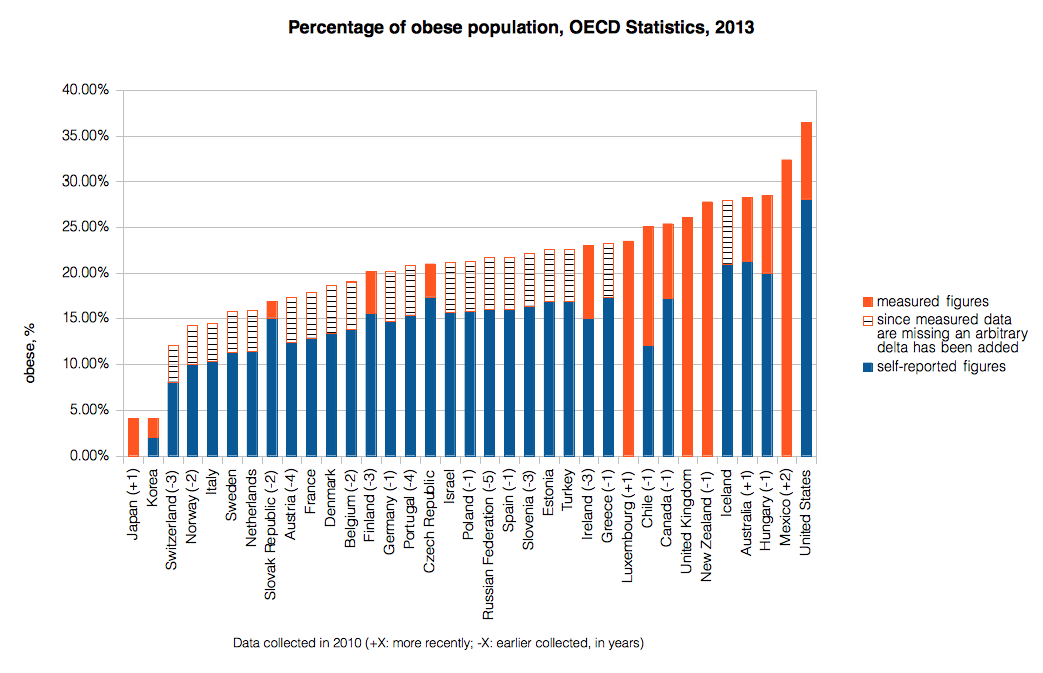
Percentage of obese population in 2010. Data source: OECD's iLibrary, http://stats.oecd.org, retrieved 2013-12-13

== Spending ==
Expand the OECD charts below to see the breakdown:

- "Government/compulsory": Government spending and compulsory health insurance.
- "Voluntary": Voluntary health insurance and private funds such as households' out-of-pocket payments, NGOs and private corporations.
- They are represented by columns starting at zero. They are not stacked. The 2 are combined to get the total.
- At the source you can run your cursor over the columns to get the year and the total for that country.
- Click the table tab at the source to get 3 lists (one after another) of amounts by country: "Total", "Government/compulsory", and "Voluntary".

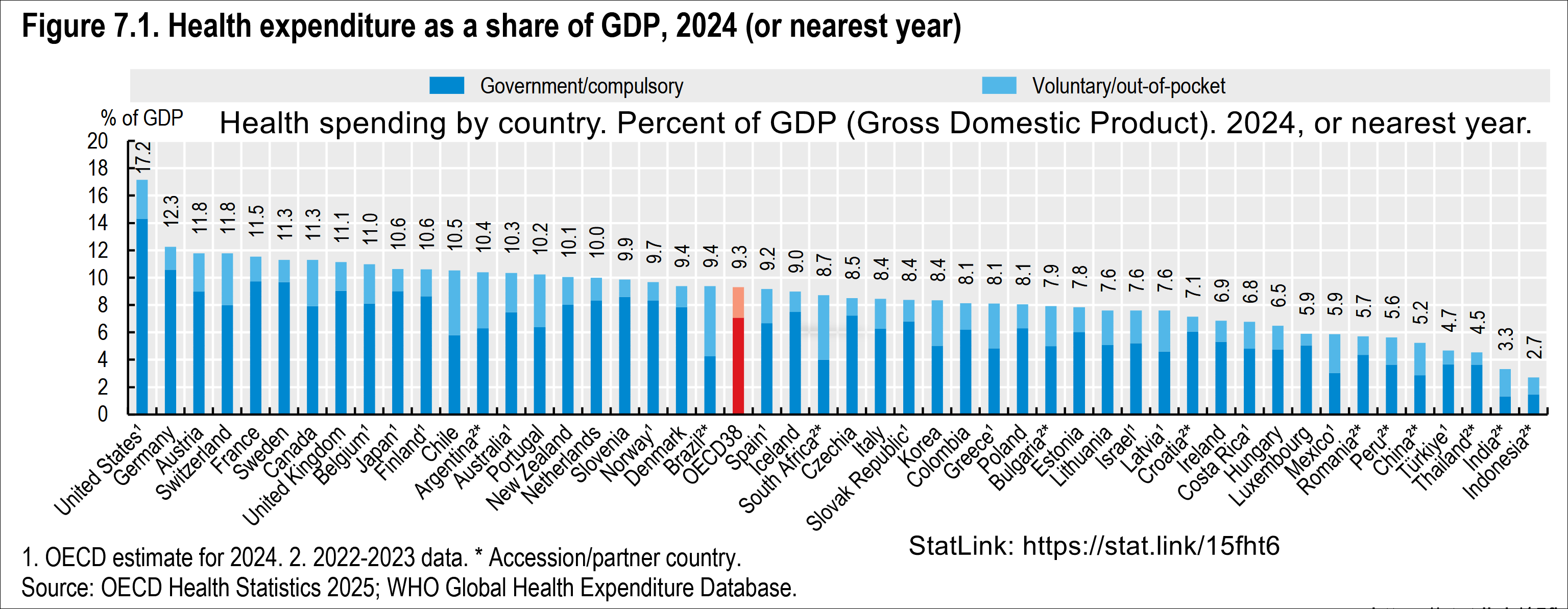
Health spending by country. Percent of GDP (Gross domestic product). For example: 11.3% for Canada in 2024. 17.2% for the United States in 2024.

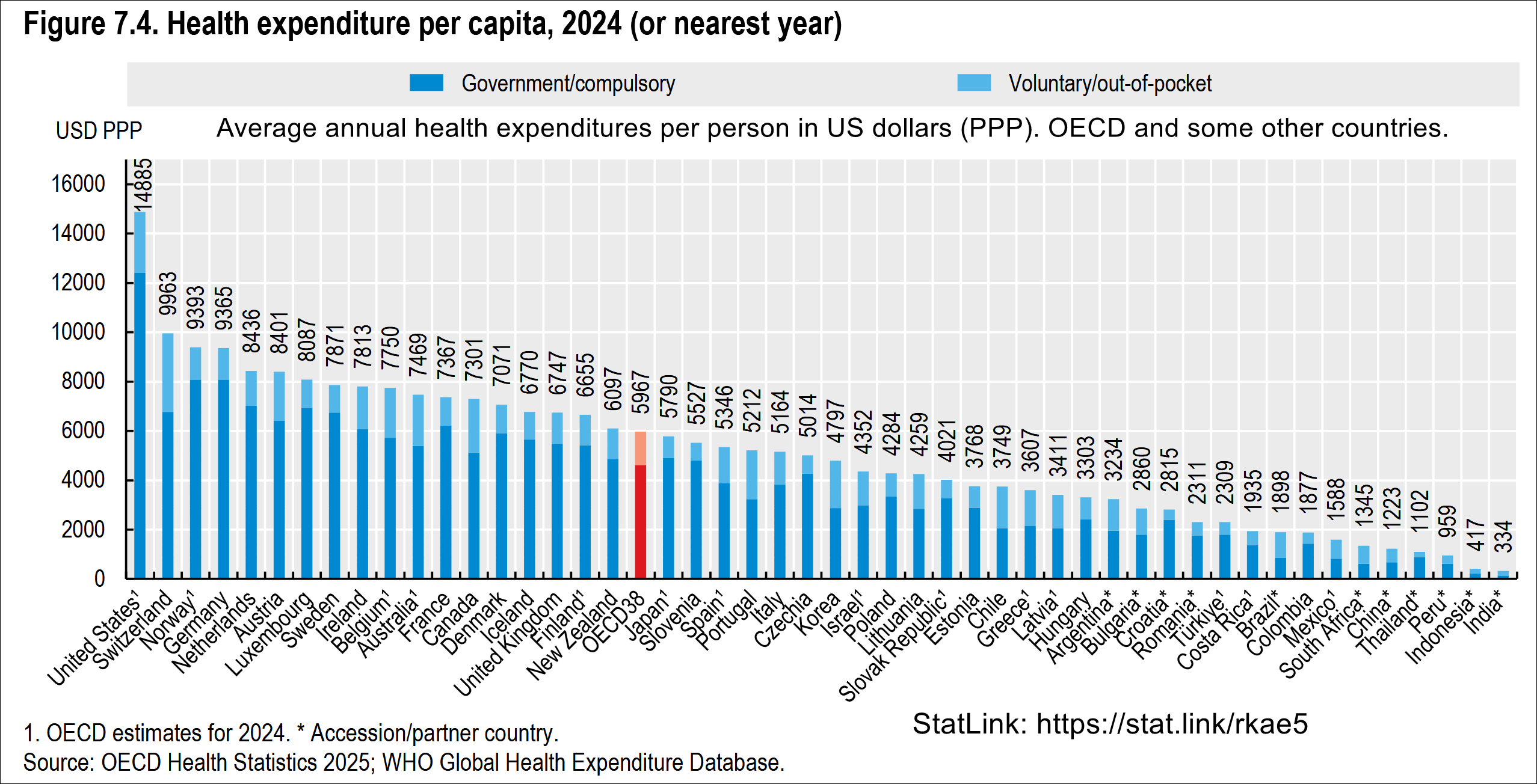
Total healthcare cost per person. Public and private spending. US dollars PPP. For example: $7,301 for Canada in 2024. $14,885 for the US in 2024.

== International comparisons ==
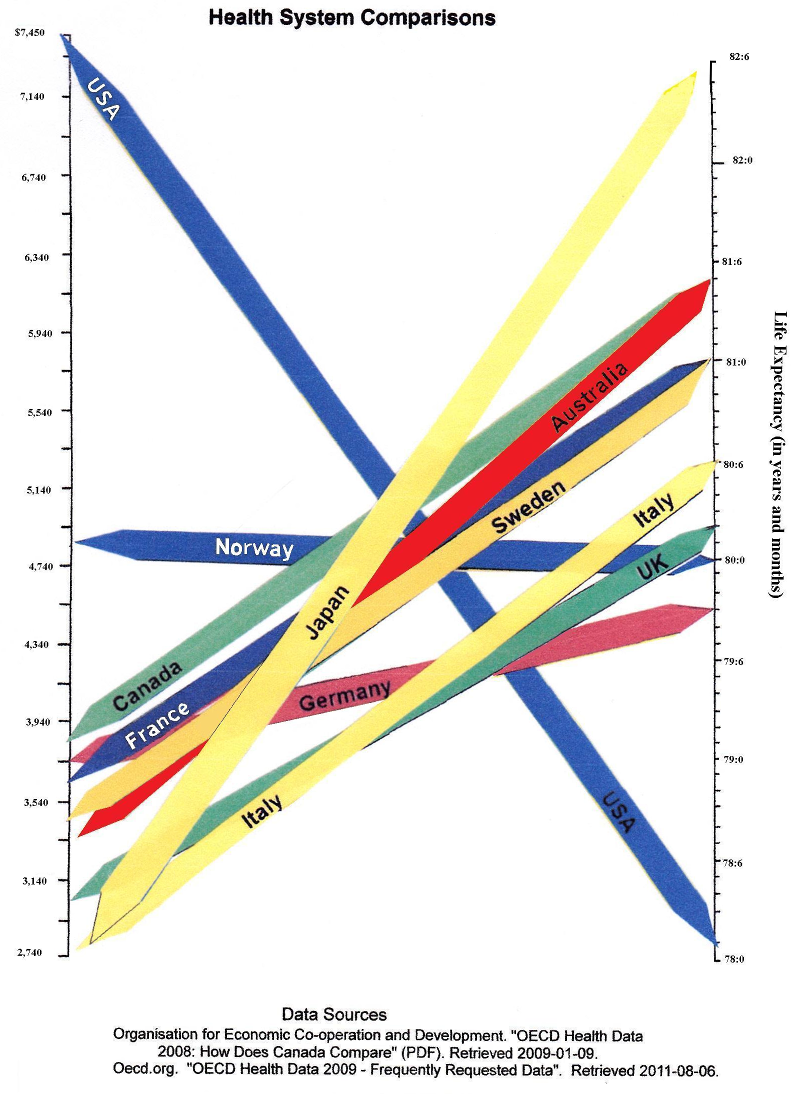
Chart comparing 2008 health care spending (left) vs. life expectancy (right) in OECD countries

Health systems can vary substantially from country to country, and in the last few years, comparisons have been made on an international basis. The World Health Organization, in its World Health Report 2000, provided a ranking of health systems around the world according to criteria of the overall level and distribution of health in the populations, and the responsiveness and fair financing of health care services. The goals for health systems, according to the WHO's World Health Report 2000 – Health systems: improving performance (WHO, 2000), are good health, responsiveness to the expectations of the population, and fair financial contribution. There have been several debates around the results of this WHO exercise, and especially based on the country ranking linked to it, insofar as it appeared to depend mostly on the choice of the retained indicators.

Direct comparisons of health statistics across nations are complex. The Commonwealth Fund, in its annual survey, "Mirror, Mirror on the Wall", compares the performance of the health systems in Australia, New Zealand, the United Kingdom, Germany, Canada and the United States. Its 2007 study found that, although the United States system is the most expensive, it consistently underperforms compared to the other countries. A major difference between the United States and the other countries in the study is that the United States is the only country without universal health care. The OECD also collects comparative statistics, and has published brief country profiles. Health Consumer Powerhouse makes comparisons between both national health care systems in the Euro health consumer index and specific areas of health care such as diabetes or hepatitis.

Ipsos MORI produces an annual study of public perceptions of healthcare services across 30 countries.

Country	Life expectancy	Infant mortality rate	Preventable deaths per 100,000 people in 2007	Physicians per 1000 people	Nurses per 1000 people	Per capita expenditure on health (USD PPP)	Healthcare costs as a percent of GDP	% of government revenue spent on health	% of health costs paid by government
Australia	83.0	4.49	57	2.8	10.1	3,353	8.5	17.7	67.5
Canada	82.0	4.78	77	2.2	9.0	3,844	10.0	16.7	70.2
Finland	79.5	2.6		2.7	15.5	3,008	8.4		
France	82.0	3.34	55	3.3	7.7	3,679	11.6	14.2	78.3
Germany	81.0	3.48	76	3.5	10.5	3,724	10.4	17.6	76.4
Italy	83.0	3.33	60	4.2	6.1	2,771	8.7	14.1	76.6
Japan	84.0	2.17	61	2.1	9.4	2,750	8.2	16.8	80.4
Norway	83.0	3.47	64	3.8	16.2	4,885	8.9	17.9	84.1
Spain	83.0	3.30	74	3.8	5.3	3,248	8.9	15.1	73.6
Sweden	82.0	2.73	61	3.6	10.8	3,432	8.9	13.6	81.4
UK	81.6	4.5	83	2.5	9.5	3,051	8.4	15.8	81.3
US	78.74	5.9	96	2.4	10.6	7,437	16.0	18.5	45.1

Physicians and hospital beds per 1000 inhabitants vs Health Care Spending in 2008 for OECD Countries. The data source is OECD.org - OECD. Since 2008, the US experienced big deviations from 16% GDP. In 2010, the year the Affordable Care Act was enacted, health care spending accounted for approximately 17.2% of the U.S. GDP. By 2019, before the pandemic, it had risen to 17.7%. During the COVID-19 pandemic, this percentage jumped to 18.8% in 2020, largely due to increased health care costs and economic contraction. Post-pandemic, health care spending relative to GDP declined to 16.6% by 2022.

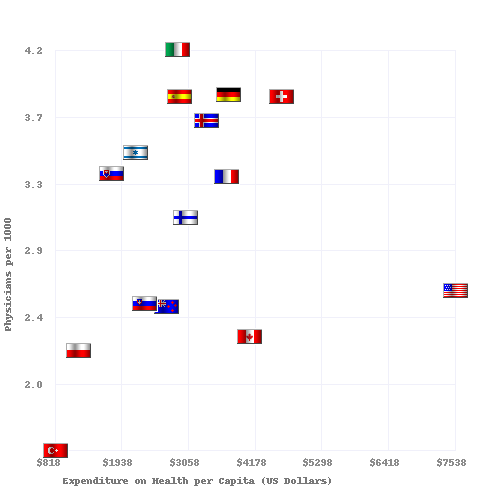
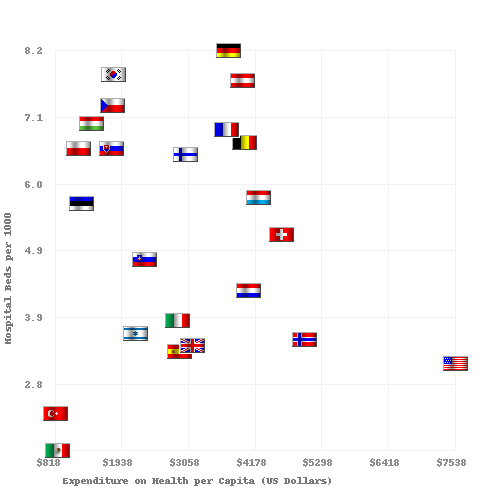

== See also ==
- Acronyms in healthcare
- Catholic Church and health care
- Clinical Health Promotion
- Community health
- Comparison of the health care systems in Canada and the United States
- Consumer-driven health care
- Cultural competence in health care
- Global health
- Genetic testing
- List of countries by health insurance coverage
- Health administration
- Health care
- Health care provider
- Health care reform
- Health crisis
- Health equity
- Health human resources
- Health insurance
- Health policy
- Health promotion
- Health services research
- Healthy city
- Hospital network
- Medicine
- National health insurance
- Occupational safety and health
- Philosophy of healthcare
- Primary care
- Primary health care
- Public health
- Publicly funded health care
- Single-payer health care
- Social determinants of health
- Socialized medicine
- Timeline of global health
- Two-tier health care
- Universal health care
