= Full Employment in a Free Society =

- First US edition
- Author: William Beveridge
- Publisher: Allen & Unwin, W. W. Norton
- Publication date: 1944
- Publication place: United Kingdom

Full Employment in a Free Society (1944) is a book by William Beveridge, author of the Beveridge Report. It was first published in the UK by Allen & Unwin.

== Overview ==
The book begins with the thesis that because individual employers are not capable of creating full employment, it must be the responsibility of the state. Full employment is defined as a state where there are slightly more vacant jobs than there are available workers, so people who lose jobs can find new ones immediately.

Unemployment should be aimed to be reduced to 3%. Beveridge claimed that the upward pressure on wages, due to the increased bargaining strength of labour, would be eased by rising productivity, and kept in check by a system of wage arbitration. The cooperation of workers would be secured by the common interest in the ideal of full employment.

The book was written in the context of an economy which would have to transfer from wartime direction to peace time. Government direction of labour (under the Essential Works Order) would cease, and workers would have a free choice of occupation.

Beveridge argued that pre-war unemployment, that hit great heights during the 1930s depression, was due to ineffective demand for industrial products, imperfect labour mobility and general labour market disorganisation. Instead, the economy should be planned, so that demand is socialised, and supply is maintained at all times.

To maintain demand, fiscal policy should be utilised. That means the Treasury's budget should gear towards increased spending when demand is otherwise down. The Social Security proposals in his better known Beveridge Report was an integral part of this.

Frictional unemployment could be remedied through the use of planning law and subsidies to draw the location of industry to the door of the labourer. The advantage of that would be fewer costs in housing and social dislocation which results from large movements of labour. Full use of employment exchanges - public employment agencies - could be used to channel mobile labour, such as younger people, where it is needed.

The evidential support for Beveridge's policy comes from the war experience. War solved unemployment by socialising demand.

== Reception ==
The most common criticism was always that the circumstances of the war were special and people were willing to tolerate more in those times than they might have otherwise. Therefore, it could not be said that just because unemployment had disappeared during the war, it would hold in times of peace. Furthermore, soldiers drafted into the war were often in forced idleness when there was no work for them.

Nevertheless, the book was highly influential for its melding of Keynesian economics with Fabian politics. Years later, Nobel Laureate Friedrich Hayek would claim that Beveridge's Full Employment in a Free Society was ghost-written by Nicholas Kaldor. Hayek said of Beveridge, "[H]e wasn't the least interested in economics. He knew no economics whatever."

== Contents ==
- Part I - Introduction and Summary
- Part II - Unemployment in Peace
  - Section 1. Facts of Unemployment
  - Section 2. Theories of Unemployment
  - Section 3. The New Face of Unemployment
- Part III - Full Employment in War
- Part IV - A Full Employment Policy for Peace
  - Section I. The Meaning and Three Conditions of Full Employment
  - Section 2. The First Condition: Adequate Total Outlay
  - Section 3. The Second Condition: Controlled Location of Industry
  - Section 4. The Third Condition: Organized Mobility of Labour

"return to the old ways of engaging labour should be definitely made impossible. Industries like dock and harbour service, which by practising casual engagement have been the main generators of chronic under-employment in the past, have been transformed in the war. It may be assumed that the main principle of the transformation will remain in peace, that the men following such occupations will have guaranteed weekly wages, and that this will lead in due course to the organization of regular work as well as of regular wages, with men working for a single employing agency or for groups of employers, in place of taking their chance with single employers at a number of separate taking-on places. It may be hoped that in many other industries the former position in regard to the engagement of men will be transformed by the substitution of weekly for daily or hourly engagements."

  - Section 5. Changes of Government Machinery
  - Section 6. Some Alternatives Examined
  - Section 7. A Full Policy for Full Employment
- Part V - Internal Implications of Full Employment
- Part VI - International Implications of Full Employment
  - Section I. Internal Policy and International Effects
  - Section 2. Britains's Need of Imports
  - Section 3. Bilateralism and the Three Conditions of Multilateral Trade
  - Section 4. The Need for Common Action
  - Section 5. The Choice for Britain
- Part VII - Full Employment and Social Conscience
- Postscript
- Appendices
- List of Tables

== See also ==
- UK labour law
