= Beveridge model =

Type of health care system

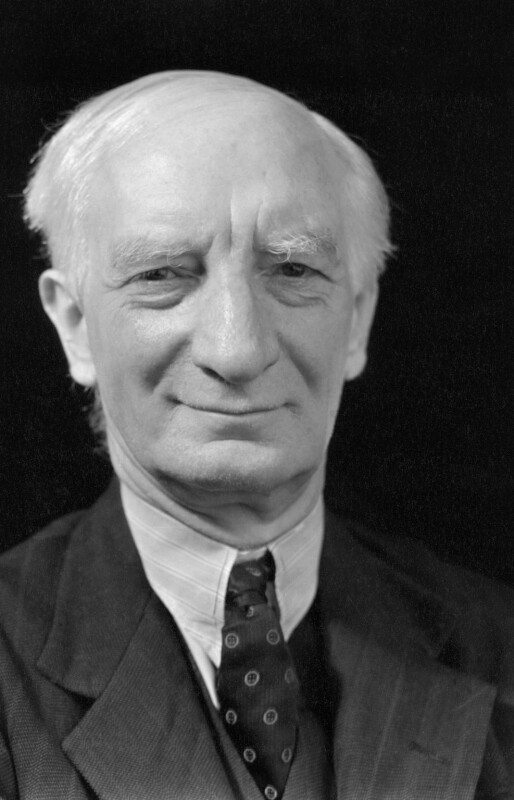
Lord William Beveridge

The "Beveridge model" is a retrospective classification used to describe tax-funded health care systems, in which the government provides health care for all its citizens through income tax payments. The phrase draws on ideas associated with the 1942 Beveridge Report but was not formally defined at the time.

Under such systems, most hospitals and clinics are owned by the government; some doctors and health care professionals are government employees, but there are also private institutions that collect their fees from the government. With the government as the single-payer in this health care system, it eliminates competition in the health care market and helps to keep the costs low. Using income tax as the main funding for health care allows for services to be free at the point of service, and the patients' contribution to taxes covers for their health care expenses.

The Beveridge model emphasizes health as a human right. Thus, universal coverage is provided by the government and anyone who is a citizen is given coverage and access to health care.

The Beveridge model has its distinct policies, but most countries use variations of this model combined with the other health care approaches. Countries that operate in some variation of the Beveridge model mostly employ a universal health care system. The universal health care system ensures that all residents within a country are guaranteed access to healthcare. The countries that are currently implementing Beveridge model policies include the United Kingdom, Italy, Spain, Denmark, Sweden, Norway, New Zealand and more.

== History ==
The Beveridge model of health care was first outlined in 1942 by William Beveridge, a British economist and social reformer whose ideas inspired the National Health Service Act 1946 which came into effect in 1948 with the creation of the United Kingdom's National Health Services (NHS). The model has since spread through many areas in Northern Europe and the world.

== Criticism ==
According to Joseph Kutzin, Coordinator of Health Financing Policy at World Health Organization, a concern regarding the system is how the government is going to respond to the health crisis. In the case of national emergency, the funding for health care may decline as public income decreases. Such a situation would cause many problems with the large influx of patients, and a solution would be to allocate emergency funds prior to any crisis.

== See also ==
- Beveridge Report
- Bismarck model
- Semashko model
- Socialized medicine
- The Healing of America
- History of the welfare state in the United Kingdom
