= Clinical health promotion =

Clinical health promotion is prevention, which includes elements of health promotion and rehabilitation, which takes place in the health care system together with patients.

The intention is to focus on and integrate prevention into a patient's pathways to reduce disease progression, prevent complications and relapse as well as maximize coping and quality of life. Clinical health promotion emanates from the health care system where the patient is the active/activated part and hence the efforts also include elements of health promotion and rehabilitation.Emphasis is placed on keeping choice and accountability with the patient, as well as empathy, feedback and positive expectations for the patient. The target audience is patients and the arena may be primary or secondary care where professionals in interaction with patients are engaged in clinical health promotion.

In addition to all of this, clinical health promotion focuses on improving general health and wellbeing rather than only curing disease. By motivating patients to use better life styles and habits, it supports an active strategy. This could include advice on maintaining a healthy diet, getting regular exercise, managing stress, and avoiding bad habits like smoking or binge-drinking.

By educating patients about risk factors, giving them personalized advice, and assisting them in setting reasonable health goals, healthcare providers play a very important role in promoting behavior change. In order to further limit problems and improve long-term results, clinical health promotion includes early illness diagnosis and successful chronic condition care.Clinical health promotion helps create a more holistic and patient centered healthcare system by combining prevention, treatment, and rehab with the ultimate goal of improving long-term health outcomes and quality of life.

Integrating prevention at all levels is a crucial part of clinical health promotion. By encouraging healthy habits and immunizations, primary prevention aims to lower the chance of illness before it appears. Early diagnosis and intervention, especially screening programs that find illnesses in the early stages, are some of the key components of secondary prevention.

By avoiding complications, promoting rehabilitation, and enhancing quality of life, tertiary prevention tries to reduce the effects of pre existing disorders. Clinical health promotion offers a thorough and ongoing approach to patient care by including each of the three stages of prevention, meeting healthcare needs at every stage of illness and recovery.

== Patient Empowerment ==
Patient Empowerment emphasis that knowledge is power. Making sure that patients have the resources to gain information about their health is key to letting them feel safe. In the clinical setting giving them the option to translate clinical guidelines into an easier routine for them to understand. Providers should also give explanation of how and why implementation of these routines will succeed or fail, and go over factors that may interfere. The end goal is to have patients feel involved and have a better understanding of their healthcare plans.

== Lifestyle Interventions ==
Lifestyle Interventions that are integrated in clinical health promotion by using qualitative and quantitative methods. Topics that are addressed include tobacco use, harmful use of alcohol, low physical activity, and poor nutrition. To combat these lifestyle choices taking initiative by doing a screening form for health behaviors, discuss and provide lifestyle advice and areas to target change. These patients need to develop strategies to implement these clinical interventions successfully.

== Preventative Focus ==
When it comes to clinical health promotion, a large focus lies on the idea of prevention. Rather than always resorting to curing after the fact, it is extremely helpful and important to start from the source and to try to prevent health issues from occurring in the first place. The World Health Organization outlines two different types of prevention — primary and secondary. Primary prevention attempts to avoid the manifestation of a disease (such as vaccines and health education), while secondary prevention deals with early detection (such as population-based screening programs and maternal and child health programs). Prevention is an extremely important of health promotion and empowering people to take control of and increase their own health, and to the health of the general population as a whole.

== Integration with Clinical Care ==
In any case, health promotion would never be truly effective if it were never actually integrated into real-world clinical care. When integrators are brought into communities in a practice called "Clinical Population Medicine" (CPM), community health is improved by engaging with both patients and populations simultaneously. By choosing to look at every factor in each community to come up with a community-based plan, these integration plans can become much more effective in achieving their intentions and truly promoting the best health outcomes for the public.

== Examples ==
Examples of clinical health promotion are:

- Smoking cessation for pregnant women
- Alcohol cessation before surgery
- Physical activity program for mentally ill
- Diabetes education
- Control of asthma patients.
