= Bismarck model =

Healthcare system

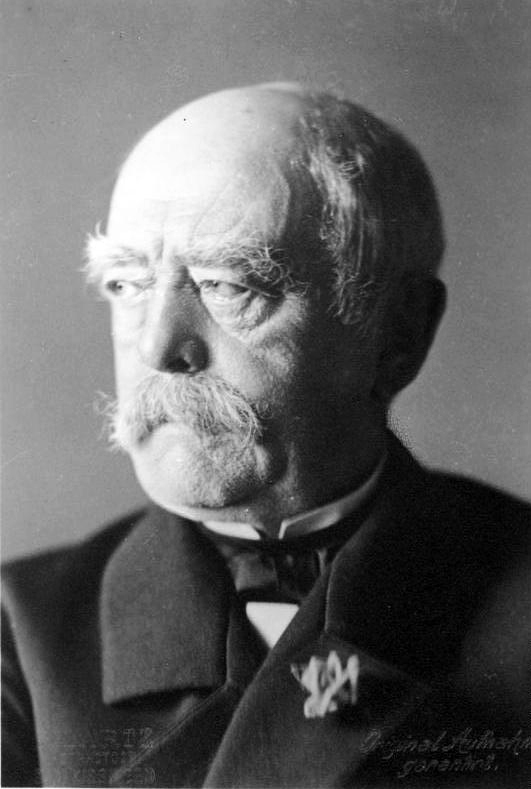
Otto von Bismarck

The Bismarck model (also referred as "Social Health Insurance Model") is a health care system in which people pay a fee to a fund that in turn pays health care activities, that can be provided by state-owned institutions, other government body-owned institutions, or a private institution. The first Bismarck model was instituted by Otto von Bismarck in 1883 and focused its effort in providing cures to the workers and their family. Since the establishment of the first Beveridge model in 1948, where the focus was into providing healthcare as a human right to everyone with funding through taxation, nearly every Bismarck system became universal, and the state started providing insurance or contributions to those unable to pay.

== History ==
After the formation of the German Empire in 1871, Chancellor Otto von Bismarck experienced opposition from German Democratic Socialists. In response, anti-socialist legislation was passed in 1878, and Bismarck made the decision to incorporate social protection schemes into his budgetary planning. Three major pieces of legislation that established state social insurance were the Compulsory Insurance Act of 1883, the Accident Insurance Act of 1884 and an old-age and disability pension system that was enacted in 1889 and began in 1891.

== Examples ==
States such as Germany, Austria, Switzerland and Czech Republic have Bismarck healthcare, while states such as South Korea and the Netherlands, while having a basic state insurance, have a much stronger private presence in the healthcare providers and insurance systems.

In Europe, countries like France, Hungary and Slovakia, while theoretically Beveridge system, have some degree of Bismarck politics in their laws. Some in Italy argue that the Lombard socio-health system, which prescribes equality between the private and public sector and payment by performance, has some typical characteristic of a Bismarck system.

== Advantages ==
The Euro health consumer index calls the statement "Bismarck beats Beveridge" a "permanent feature" since 2014. Bismarck systems usually have significantly higher accessibility, lower waiting times and, thanks to the competition between operators, higher quality and more consumer-oriented healthcare.

Studies show that the introduction of the Bismarck system in Germany led to a significant drop in mortality.

== Criticism ==
Since in the Bismarck health system the core financing are contributions, people in poverty can't pay and get limited coverage. In some countries, like Switzerland, the cost of insurance is high and continues to grow, leading part of the population to be under-insured.

Another criticism is that since institutions are paid by performance some isolated localities may have little hospital coverage.

While primary care is significantly faster to get in a Bismarck system than in a Beveridge system some argue that some elective care may be slow to get even in a Bismarck system than in a free-market healthcare, like the US.

== See also ==
- Semashko model
- Beveridge model
- Health system
- Health insurance cooperative
- Two-tier healthcare
