= Janet Philip =

The Right Honourable The Lady Beveridge OBE
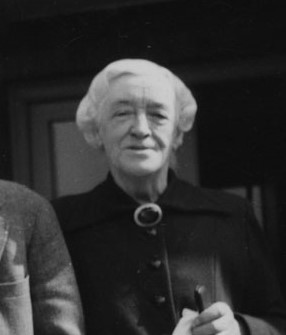
- Born: 26 November 1876; Dundee, Scotland, United Kingdom of Great Britain and Ireland
- Died: 25 April 1959 (aged 82)
- Education: High School of Dundee
- Alma mater: University of St Andrews
- Employer: London School for Economics (LSE)
- Known for: Beveridge Report
- Spouses: David Mair (m. 1897; died 1942) William Beveridge (m. 1942)

Janet Thomson Philip, Baroness Beveridge OBE (26 November 1876 – 25 April 1959), known as Jessy Philip, Jessy Mair and later Janet Beveridge, was a member of the third cohort of female students to study at the University of St Andrews and was School Secretary at the London School for Economics (LSE) from 1920 to 1939. She took a role in producing and promoting the Beveridge Report that her husband William Beveridge had been commissioned to write by the Churchill war ministry Labour-Conservative coalition government.

== Early life and education ==
Janet Thomson Philip, known as Jessy during her childhood and first marriage, was born in Dundee on 26 November 1876. She left the High School of Dundee to study mathematics at the University of St Andrews from 1893 to 1897.

== Career ==
From July 1915, Philip volunteered for the Ministry of Munitions before joining as a staff member. She was appointed to a role at the Ministry of Food as it was inaugurated in 1916, and took on the role of Assistant Director for Bacon Distribution in September 1917. As "Jessy Mair", she was appointed Officer of the Order of the British Empire in the 1918 New Year Honours.

Between 1920 and 1938, she served as School Secretary and Acting Dean at the London School for Economics and was closely involved in the development of the LSE logo and motto. She had previously worked with William Beveridge, LSE Director, as his private secretary at the Ministry of Munitions.

From 1935, Philip produced 30 columns a year on London University affairs for the Sunday Times for 3 guineas a week.

Between 1934 and 1935, she encouraged the study of modern languages at the LSE, and championed the creation of courses for civil service examination.

Archival research by Ann Oakley, Professor of Sociology and Social Policy at UCL, found that Philip was instrumental in helping to produce and publicise the Beveridge Report which led to the founding of the welfare state in the United Kingdom; she and Beveridge married within a few weeks after its publication.

== Personal life ==
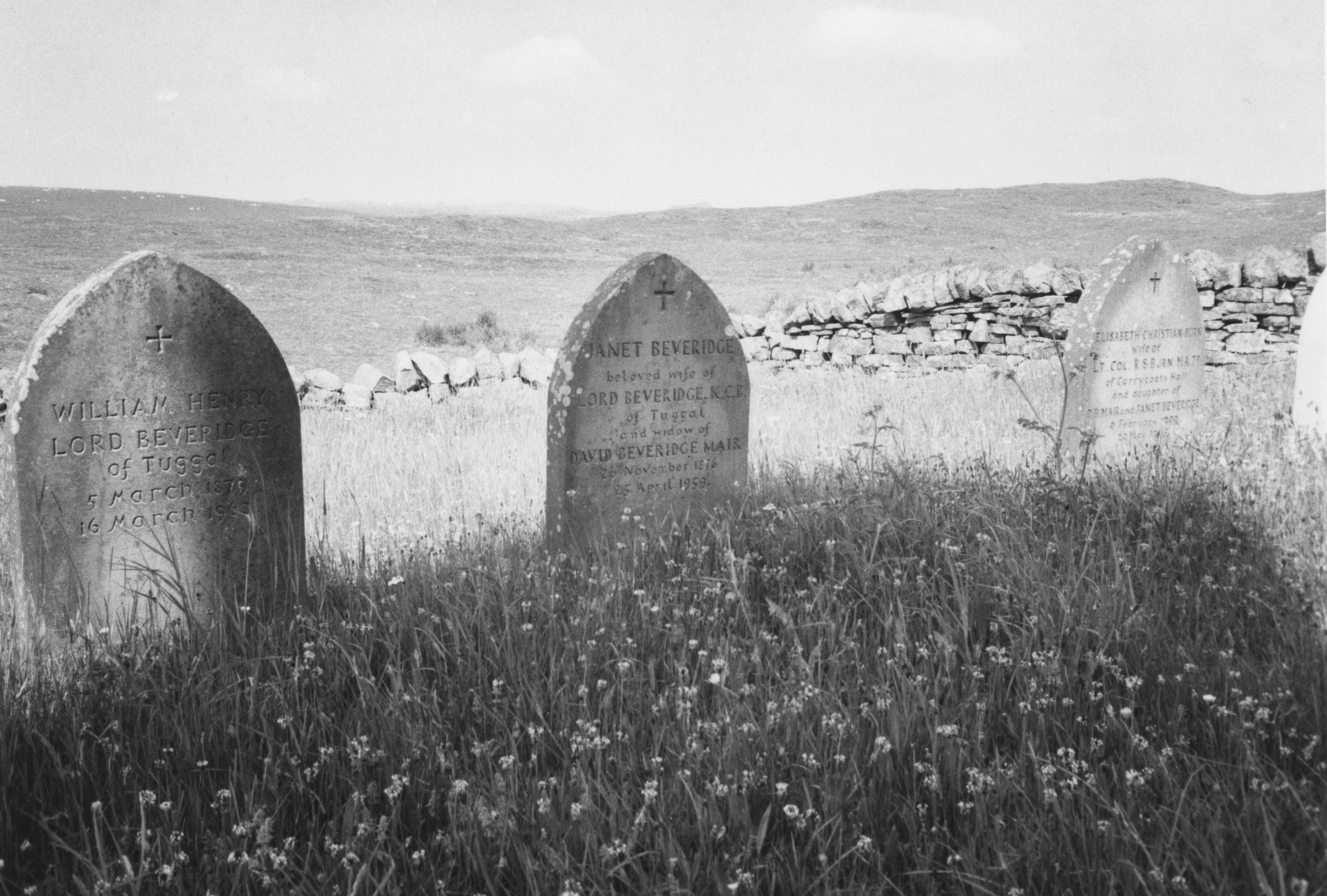
The graves of Lord and Lady Beveridge

While studying mathematics at St Andrews Philip met David Beveridge Mair, a mathematician from the University of Cambridge, when he was her external examiner. They married in Newport on Tay in 1897 and had four children, including Lucy Mair, a notable professor of Anthropology. After he retired in 1933, David Mair rarely lived at home; he died in 1942.

At the LSE Jessy Mair worked with her husband's cousin William Beveridge (1st Baron Beveridge, KCB (5 March 1879 – 16 March 1963)) who was LSE Director between 1919 and 1937. Six months after her first husband's death, she married Beveridge on 15 December 1942 and became Lady Beveridge. It is considered unlikely that their relationship was physical even after marriage. They are buried at Thockrington Church in Northumberland, England.
