= Health Consumer Powerhouse =

Swedish-based think tank

Health Consumer Powerhouse is a Swedish health policy think tank which specialises in comparing healthcare systems throughout Europe. It produces the Euro health consumer index and other indexes comparing healthcare.

It was created in 2004 by Johan Hjertqvist, a Swedish entrepreneur, author and former local politician. It has offices in Stockholm, Sweden. Dr Arne A Björnberg is the President of the company. he was formerly Chief Executive of the Swedish National Pharmacy Corporation.

The Euro Health Consumer Index is a comparison of European health care systems based on waiting times, results, and generosity. The information is presented as a graphic index. Part of the motivation of the HCP in 2004 was to stimulate the European Union to take action on transparency and quality measures. The 2014 ranking included 37 countries measured by 48 indicators. The Euro Health Consumer Index measurements started in 2005. In 2013 the then Lithuanian Health Minister Vytenis Andriukaitis, said that the European Commission assessed various benchmarks for healthcare comparison and found that EHCI was the most reliable, but stressed in 2014 that he believed the EHCI could foster discussion among healthcare stakeholders, "[...] despite certain reservations I may have regarding the objectivity and the methodology used [...]".

Scoring is partly based on the responses from patient organisations to a questionnaire, particularly when their responses indicate a radically different situation from that officially reported. 976 responses were used in the 2015 exercise.
