= Robert Thorp (MP) =

Robert Allen Fenwick Thorp (12 February 1900 – 5 May 1966) was an army officer and British Conservative Party politician.

Thorp was the son of Thomas Alder Thorp, solicitor, of Bondgate Hall, Alnwick, Northumberland, and Elizabeth Jane Thorp (née Peak). He was educated at Charterhouse and at military college in Quetta (then in India, now Pakistan). He began his army career in the British Indian Army, serving on the Northwestern frontier with the 3rd Skinner's Horse cavalry regiment before transferring to the 1st regiment of the Life Guards in 1921. Throughout the early 1930s he was an adjutant to the Northumberland Hussars before attending the Staff College in Camberley, where he graduated as a staff officer in 1937. When the Second World War broke out Thorp was posted initially to France with the 3rd Division, moving on to Palestine and then East Africa, where he witnessed the capture of Addis Ababa with the 11th (African) Division during the Abyssinian Campaign. In 1942 he was sent to Northern Rhodesia as a full colonel, and the following year was appointed a brigadier in command of the 31st (East African) Brigade on the Abyssinian frontier.

Thorp was appointed a Member of the Order of the British Empire in 1941. He was Conservative Member of Parliament for Berwick-upon-Tweed from 1945 until he retired from the House of Commons at the 1951 general election. A backbencher, he spoke mostly on issues concerning either the armed forces or his constituency.

Parliament of the United Kingdom
Preceded by Sir William Beveridge	Member of Parliament for Berwick-upon-Tweed; 1945 – 1951	Succeeded by Antony Lambton
