= George Charles Grey =

British politician (1918–1944)

Captain George Charles Grey
- Grey in 1936 (aged 18)
- Born: 2 December 1918
- Died: 30 July 1944 (aged 25); Normandy, German-occupied France
- Burial place: Le Repas; 49°05′33.7″N 0°47′02.5″W
- Military career
- Allegiance: United Kingdom
- Branch: Army
- Service years: 1938–1944
- Rank: Captain
- Service number: 79683
- Units: 4th Battalion, Grenadier Guards
- Conflicts: Second World War: Battle of France; Operation Dynamo; Western Allied invasion of France; Battle of Normandy; Operation Bluecoat †

Member of Parliament for Berwick-upon-Tweed
- In office 18 August 1941 – 30 July 1944
- Preceded by: Hugh Seely
- Succeeded by: William Beveridge

George Charles Grey (2 December 1918 – 30 July 1944) was Liberal Member of Parliament (MP) for the Berwick-upon-Tweed constituency in England from August 1941 until his death in action in July 1944.

== Early life ==
George Charles Grey was the son of Major-General Wulff Henry Grey CB, CMG of the Royal Engineers and Alix Grey. His education took in Durnford School at Langton Matravers, Winchester College and, following a year at Berlin University, to Hertford College, Oxford.

== Politics ==
From the 1931 election, when Grey braved public opinion at his private school by flaunting the Liberal colours, he was a devoted and unswervingly faithful adherent of the Liberal Party. He stood unopposed in a by-election triggered by Sir Hugh Michael Seely being elevated to the peerage. He was sworn in at the House of Commons on 9 September 1941. Grey made his maiden speech there on 17 December 1941 in a debate on 'service pay and dependants' allowances'. He closed his speech with these words:

So I would beg most sincerely that the Government should consider this last point and what should be done for the Forces after the war. If they decide it now and arrange this method, it will help morale considerably, and make soldiers realise that provision is being made not only to win the war but to help them win their peace.

— Captain George Charles Grey, Hansard, 17 December 1941

Between his election and his death, he was the youngest member of the House of Commons, having been elected at the age of 22. Not only was he youngest member of that Parliament, he was the youngest MP of the 20th Century.

Following the death of Grey when he was killed in action with his regiment in France, William Beveridge retained Berwick for the Liberals in the subsequent by-election.

His death was noted by the House when Speaker of the Commons, Douglas Clifton Brown informed the Members. His words were recorded in Hansard:

I regret to have to inform the House of the death, in action, of Captain George Charles Grey, Member for the County of Northumberland (Berwick-upon-Tweed Division), and I desire on behalf of the House to express our sense of the loss we have sustained and our sympathy with the relatives of the honourable Member.

— Douglas Clifton Brown, Hansard, 26 September 1944

== Military career ==
In 1938, Grey joined the Grenadier Guards Supplementary Reserve of Officers. He served with the regiment during the Battle of France and participated in the Dunkirk Evacuation.

A captain in the 4th Battalion Grenadier Guards, he was participating in Operation Bluecoat when he was killed by a sniper as his tank was hit advancing through Lutain Wood.

He was buried on the battlefield by his men, on the site of which his family later erected a memorial. The residents of Le Repas and Captain Grey's family were 'emphatic in their desire' for the grave to remain in place. The stone for the cross came from the Houses of Parliament in London. The site is now recognised as a war grave, designated the Livry (Le Repas) Isolated Grave.

A memorial service was held at St. Margaret's, Westminster on 27 September 1944.

Parliament of the United Kingdom
Preceded by Sir Hugh Michael Seely	MP for Berwick-upon-Tweed; 1941–1944	Succeeded by William Beveridge
Preceded by John Profumo	Baby of the House; 1941–1944	Succeeded by John Profumo
