= William Beveridge =

British Liberal politician, economist, and social reformer (1879–1963)

The Right Honourable The Lord Beveridge KCB
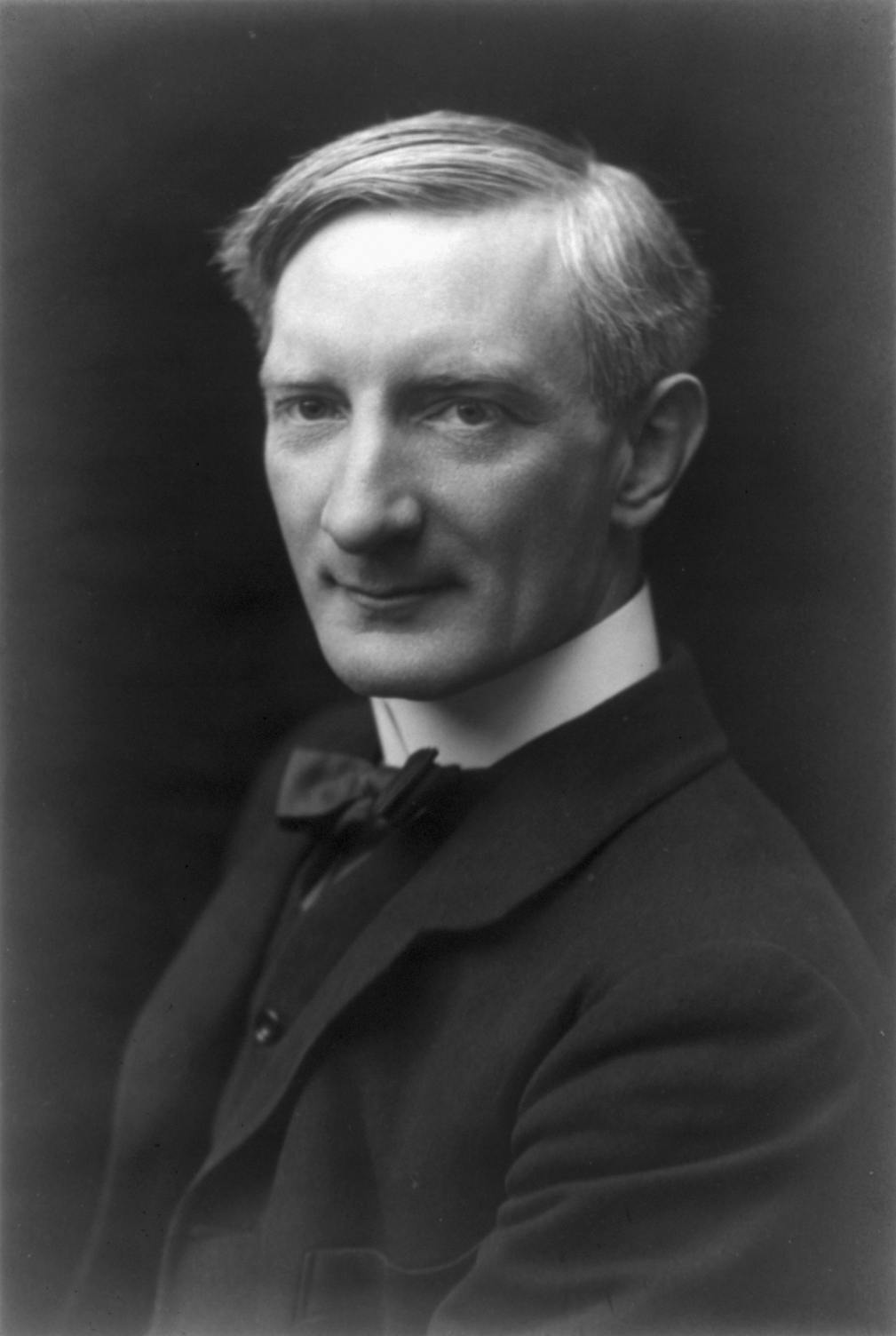
- Beveridge in the 1910s

Member of Parliament for Berwick-upon-Tweed
- In office 17 October 1944 – 15 June 1945
- Preceded by: George Charles Grey
- Succeeded by: Robert Thorp
- Majority: 7,523 (74.8%)

Personal details
- Born: 5 March 1879 Rangpur, Bengal Presidency, British Raj
- Died: 16 March 1963 (aged 84) Oxford, Oxfordshire, England
- Party: Liberal
- Spouse: Janet Philip (m. 1942; died 1959)
- Parents: Henry Beveridge (father); Annette Akroyd (mother)
- Education: Charterhouse School
- Alma mater: Balliol College, Oxford
- Occupation: Economist; politician
- Known for: Work towards founding the Welfare State in the United Kingdom

William Henry Beveridge, 1st Baron Beveridge, KCB (5 March 1879 – 16 March 1963) was a British economist, eugenicist and Liberal politician who played a central role in designing the British welfare state. His 1942 report Social Insurance and Allied Services (known as the Beveridge Report) served as the basis for the welfare state put in place by the Labour government elected in 1945.

He built his career as an expert on unemployment insurance. He served on the Board of Trade as Director of the newly created labour exchanges, and later as Permanent Secretary of the Ministry of Food. He was Director of the London School of Economics and Political Science from 1919 until 1937, when he was elected Master of University College, Oxford.

Beveridge published widely on unemployment and social security, his most notable works being: Unemployment: A Problem of Industry (1909), Planning Under Socialism (1936), Full Employment in a Free Society (1944), Pillars of Security (1943), Power and Influence (1953) and A Defence of Free Learning (1959). He was elected in the 1944 Berwick-upon-Tweed by-election as a Liberal MP. Following his defeat in the 1945 general election, he was elevated to the House of Lords where he served as the leader of the Liberal peers.

== Early life and education ==
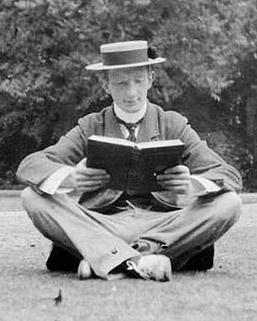
Beveridge at Balliol College in 1898

Beveridge, the eldest son of Henry Beveridge, an Indian Civil Service officer and District Judge, and scholar Annette Ackroyd, was born in Rangpur, India (now in Bangladesh), on 5 March 1879.

Beveridge's mother had, with Elizabeth Malleson, founded the Working Women's College in Queen Square, London in 1864. She met and married Henry Beveridge in Calcutta where she had gone in 1873 to open a school for Indian girls. William Beveridge was educated at Charterhouse, a leading public school near the market town of Godalming in Surrey, followed by Balliol College at the University of Oxford, where he studied Mathematics and Classics, obtaining a first class degree in both. He later studied law.

While Beveridge's mother had been a member of the Stourbridge Unitarian community, his father was an early humanist and positivist activist and "an ardent disciple" of the French philosopher Auguste Comte. Comte's ideas of a secular religion of humanity were a prominent influence in the household and would exert a lasting influence on Beveridge's thinking. Beveridge himself became a "materialist agnostic", in his words.

== Career ==
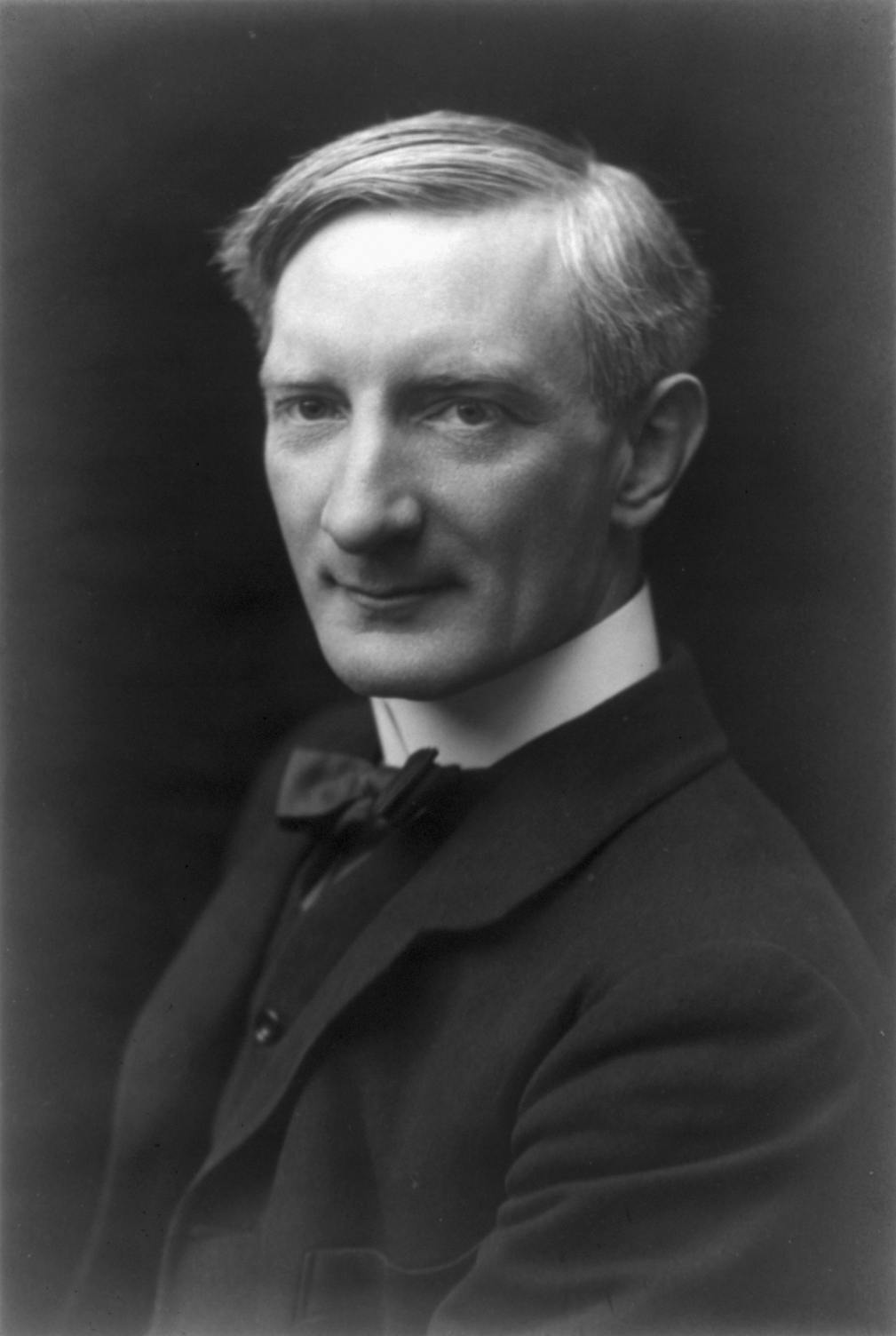
Beveridge in the 1910s

After leaving university, Beveridge initially became a lawyer. He became interested in the social services and wrote about the subject for the Morning Post newspaper. His interest in the causes of unemployment began in 1903 when he worked at Toynbee Hall, a settlement house in London. There he worked closely with Sidney Webb and Beatrice Webb and was influenced by their theories of social reform, becoming active in promoting old age pensions, free school meals, and campaigning for a national system of labour exchanges.

In 1908, now considered to be Britain's leading authority on unemployment insurance, he was introduced by Beatrice Webb to Winston Churchill, who had recently been promoted to the Cabinet as President of the Board of Trade. Churchill invited Beveridge to join the Board of Trade, and he organised the implementation of the national system of labour exchanges and National Insurance to combat unemployment and poverty. During the First World War he was involved in mobilising and controlling manpower. After the war, he was knighted and made permanent secretary to the Ministry of Food.

In 1919, he left the civil service to become director of the London School of Economics. Over the next few years he served on several commissions and committees on social policy. He was so highly influenced by the Fabian Society socialists – in particular by Beatrice Webb, with whom he worked on the 1909 Poor Laws report – that he could be considered one of their number. He published academic economic works including his early work on unemployment (1909). The Fabians made him director of the LSE in 1919, a post he retained until 1937. During his time as director, he jousted with Edwin Cannan and Lionel Robbins, who were trying to steer the LSE away from its Fabian roots. From 1929 he led the International scientific committee on price history, contributing a large historical study, Prices and Wages in England from the Twelfth to the Nineteenth Century (1939).

In 1933, he helped set up the Academic Assistance Council, which helped prominent academics who had been dismissed from their posts on grounds of race, religion or political position to escape Nazi persecution. In 1937, Beveridge was appointed Master of University College, Oxford.

== Wartime work ==
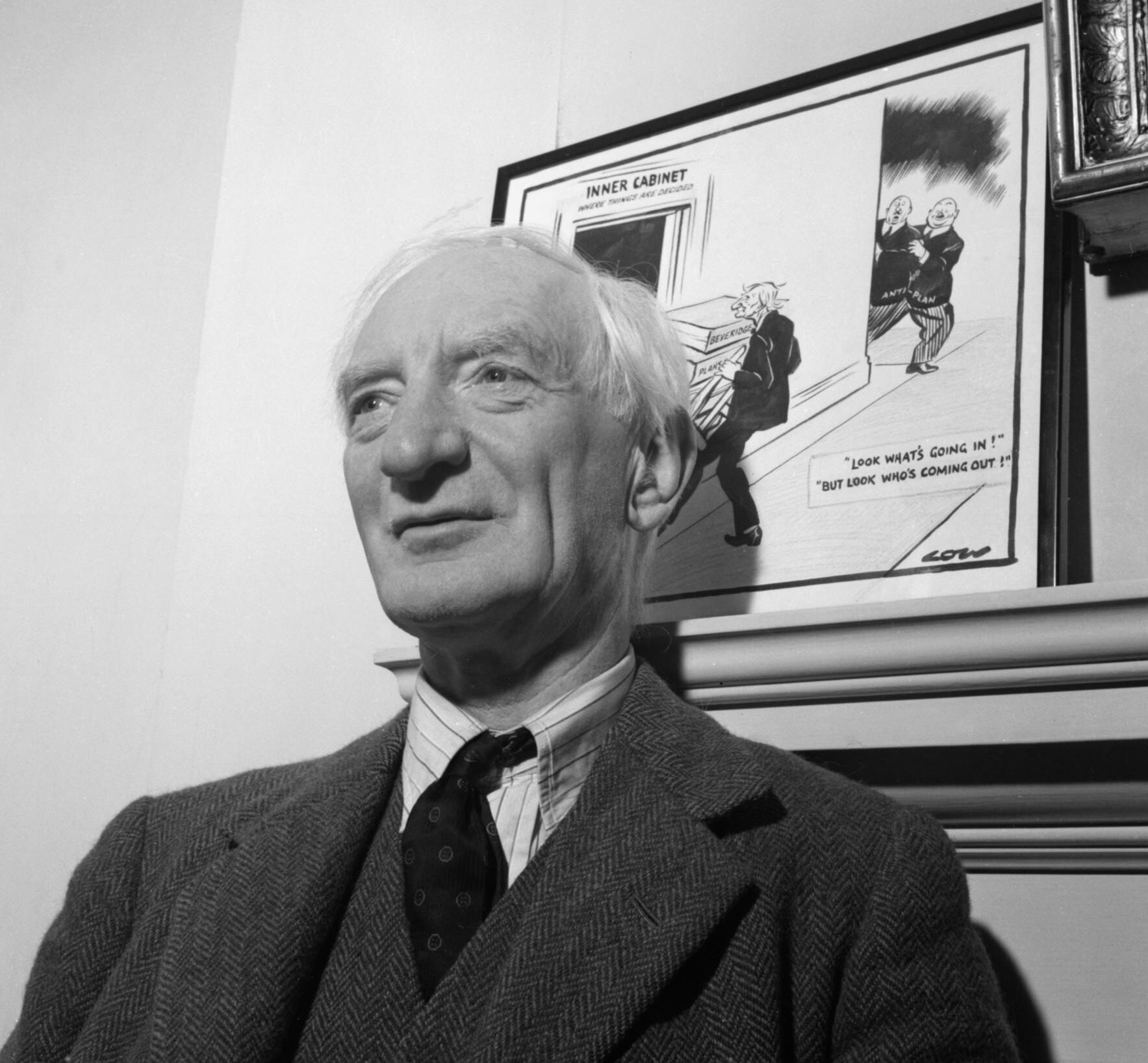
Beveridge in 1943

Three years later, Ernest Bevin, Minister of Labour in the wartime National government, invited Beveridge to take charge of the Welfare department of his Ministry. Beveridge refused, but declared an interest in organising British manpower in wartime (Beveridge had come to favour a strong system of centralised planning). Bevin was reluctant to let Beveridge have his way but did commission him to work on a relatively unimportant manpower survey from June 1940, and so Beveridge became a temporary civil servant. Neither Bevin nor the Permanent Secretary of the Ministry Sir Thomas Phillips liked working with Beveridge as both found him conceited.

His work on manpower culminated in his chairmanship of the Committee on Skilled Men in the Services which reported to the War Cabinet in August and October 1941. Two recommendations of the committee were implemented: Army recruits were enlisted for their first six weeks into the General Service Corps, so that their subsequent posting could take account of their skills and the Army's needs; and the Corps of Royal Electrical and Mechanical Engineers was created.

=== Report on social insurance and views on full employment ===
An opportunity for Bevin to ease Beveridge out presented itself in May 1941 when Minister of Health Ernest Brown announced the formation of a committee of officials to survey existing social insurance and allied services, and to make recommendations. Although Brown had made the announcement, the inquiry had largely been urged by Minister without Portfolio Arthur Greenwood, and Bevin suggested to Greenwood making Beveridge chairman of the committee. Beveridge, at first uninterested and seeing the committee as a distraction from his work on manpower, accepted only reluctantly.

The report to Parliament on Social Insurance and Allied Services was published in November 1942. It proposed that all people of working age should pay a weekly national insurance contribution. In return, benefits would be paid to people who were sick, unemployed, retired or widowed. Beveridge argued that this system would provide a minimum standard of living "below which no one should be allowed to fall". It recommended that the government should find ways of fighting the "five giants on the road of reconstruction" of Want, Disease, Ignorance, Squalor and Idleness. Beveridge included as one of three fundamental assumptions the fact that there would be a National Health Service of some sort, a policy already being worked on in the Ministry of Health.

Beveridge's arguments were widely accepted. He appealed to conservatives and other sceptics by arguing that welfare institutions would increase the competitiveness of British industry in the post-war period, not only by shifting labour costs like healthcare and pensions out of corporate ledgers and onto the public account but also by producing healthier, wealthier and thus more motivated and productive workers who would also serve as a great source of demand for British goods.

Beveridge saw full employment (defined as unemployment of no more than 3%) as the pivot of the social welfare programme he expressed in the 1942 report. Full Employment in a Free Society, written in 1944 expressed the view that it was "absurd" to "look to individual employers for maintenance of demand and full employment." These things must be "undertaken by the State under the supervision and pressure of democracy." Measures for achieving full-employment might include Keynesian-style fiscal regulation, direct control of manpower, and state control of the means of production. The impetus behind Beveridge's thinking was social justice, and the creation of an ideal new society after the war. He believed that the discovery of objective socio-economic laws could solve the problems of society.

== Global policy ==
Along with Albert Einstein, Beveridge was one of the sponsors of the Peoples' World Convention (PWC), also known as Peoples' World Constituent Assembly (PWCA), which took place in 1950–51 at Palais Electoral, Geneva, Switzerland.

He was also one of the signatories of the agreement to convene a convention for drafting a world constitution. As a result, for the first time in human history, a World Constituent Assembly convened to draft and adopt a Constitution for the Federation of Earth.

== Later career ==
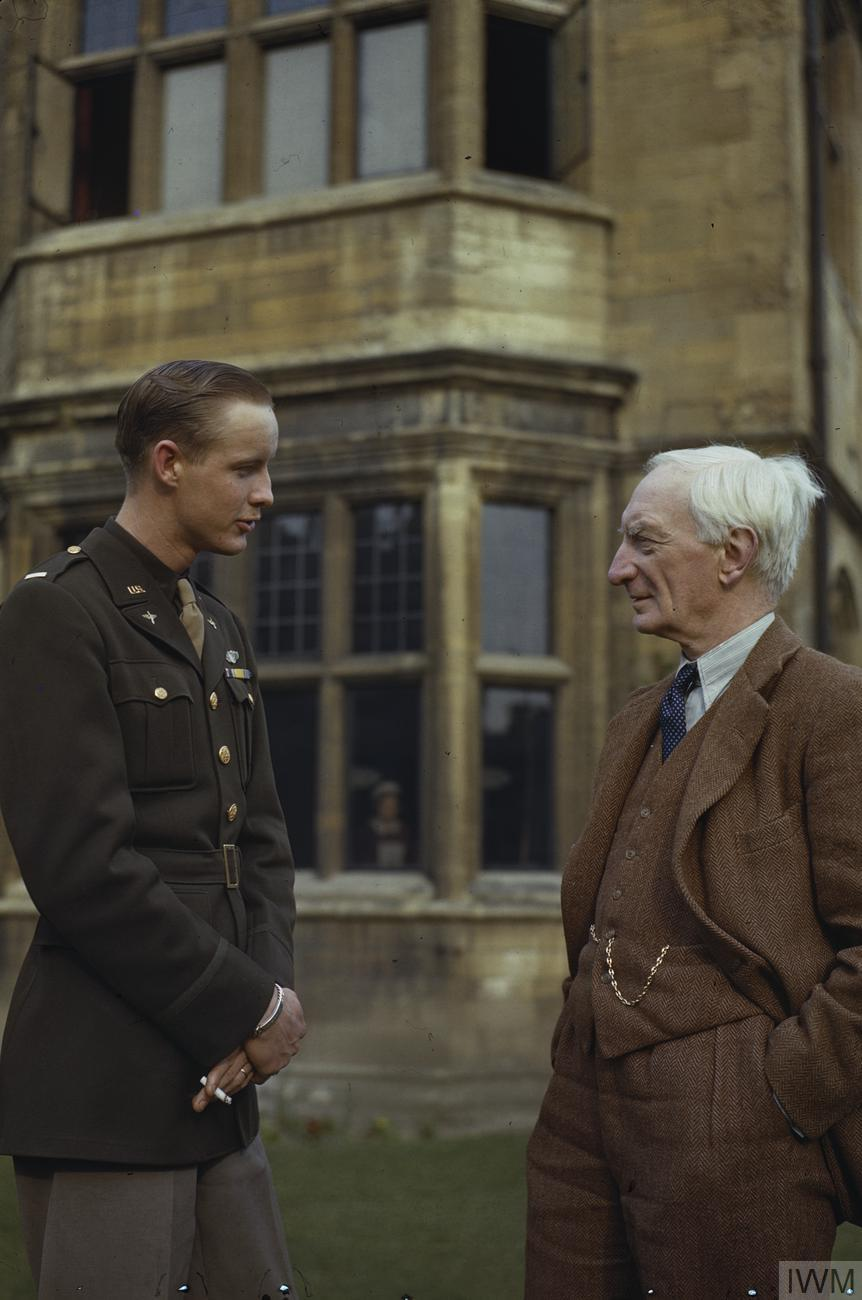
Beveridge talking to an American fighter pilot hospitalised at University College, Oxford during the Second World War

Later in 1944, Beveridge, who had recently joined the Liberal Party, was elected to the Commons in a by-election for the Berwick-upon-Tweed seat to succeed George Charles Grey, who had died on the battlefield in Normandy, France, on the first day of Operation Bluecoat on 30 July 1944. During his time as a Member of Parliament he was prominent in the Radical Action group, which called for the party to withdraw from the war-time electoral pact and adopt more radical policies. He lost his seat at the 1945 general election, when he was defeated by the Conservative candidate, Robert Thorp, by a majority of 1,962 votes.

Clement Attlee and the Labour Party defeated Winston Churchill's Conservative Party in that election and the new Labour Government began the process of implementing Beveridge's proposals that provided the basis of the modern Welfare State. Attlee announced he would introduce the Welfare State outlined in the 1942 Beveridge Report. This included the establishment of a National Health Service in 1948 with taxpayer funded medical treatment for all. A national system of benefits was also introduced to provide "social security" so that the population would be protected from the "cradle to the grave". The new system was partly built upon the National Insurance scheme set up by then-Chancellor of the Exchequer and future Liberal Prime Minister David Lloyd George in 1911.

In 1946, Beveridge was elevated to the House of Lords as Baron Beveridge, of Tuggal in the County of Northumberland, and eventually became leader of the Liberal Party in the House of Lords. He was the author of Power and Influence (1953). He was the President of the charity Attend (then the National Association of Leagues of Hospital Friends) from 1952 to 1962.

== Eugenics ==
Beveridge was a member of the Eugenics Society, which, at the time, promoted the study of various methods to improve health and prevent birth physical disabilities; some wished to 'improve' the human race by controlling reproduction. In 1909, he proposed that men who could not work should be supported by the state "but with complete and permanent loss of all citizen rights – including not only the franchise but civil freedom and fatherhood." That said, Beveridge's overwhelming view on solving inherited health issues was to address their socio-economic causes with long term impact on health. Jose Harris states, "His contribution to the inter-war eugenics debate was overwhelmingly an environmentalist one, based on the possibility of ‘racial’ improvement through better housing, preventive medicine, childcare, and nutrition.” Whilst director of the London School of Economics, Beveridge attempted to create a Department of Social Biology. Though never fully established, Lancelot Hogben, a fierce anti-eugenicist, was named its chair. Former LSE director John Ashworth speculated that discord between those in favour and those against the serious study of eugenics led to Beveridge's departure from the school in 1937.

In the 1940s, Beveridge credited the Eugenics Society with promoting the children's allowance, which was incorporated into his 1942 report. However, whilst he held views in support of eugenics, he did not believe the report had any overall "eugenic value". Professor Danny Dorling said that "there is not even the faintest hint" of eugenic thought in the report.

Beveridge was keen to convince everyone that his social reforms vision was compatible with all political agendas and philosophical creeds: Dennis Sewell states, "On the day the House of Commons met to debate the Beveridge Report in 1943, its author slipped out of the gallery early in the evening to address a meeting of the Eugenics Society at the Mansion House. ... His report he was keen to reassure them, was eugenic in intent and would prove so in effect. ... The idea of child allowances had been developed within the society with the twin aims of encouraging the educated professional classes to have more children than they currently did and, at the same time, to limit the number of children born to poor households. For both effects to be properly stimulated, the allowance needed to be graded: middle-class parents receiving more generous payments than working-class parents. ... The Home Secretary had that very day signalled that the government planned a flat rate of child allowance. But Beveridge, alluding to the problem of an overall declining birth rate, argued that even the flat rate would be eugenic. Nevertheless, he held out hope for the purists." 'Sir William made it clear that it was in his view not only possible but desirable that graded family allowance schemes, applicable to families in the higher income brackets, be administered concurrently with his flat rate scheme,' reported the Eugenics Review.

== Personal life ==
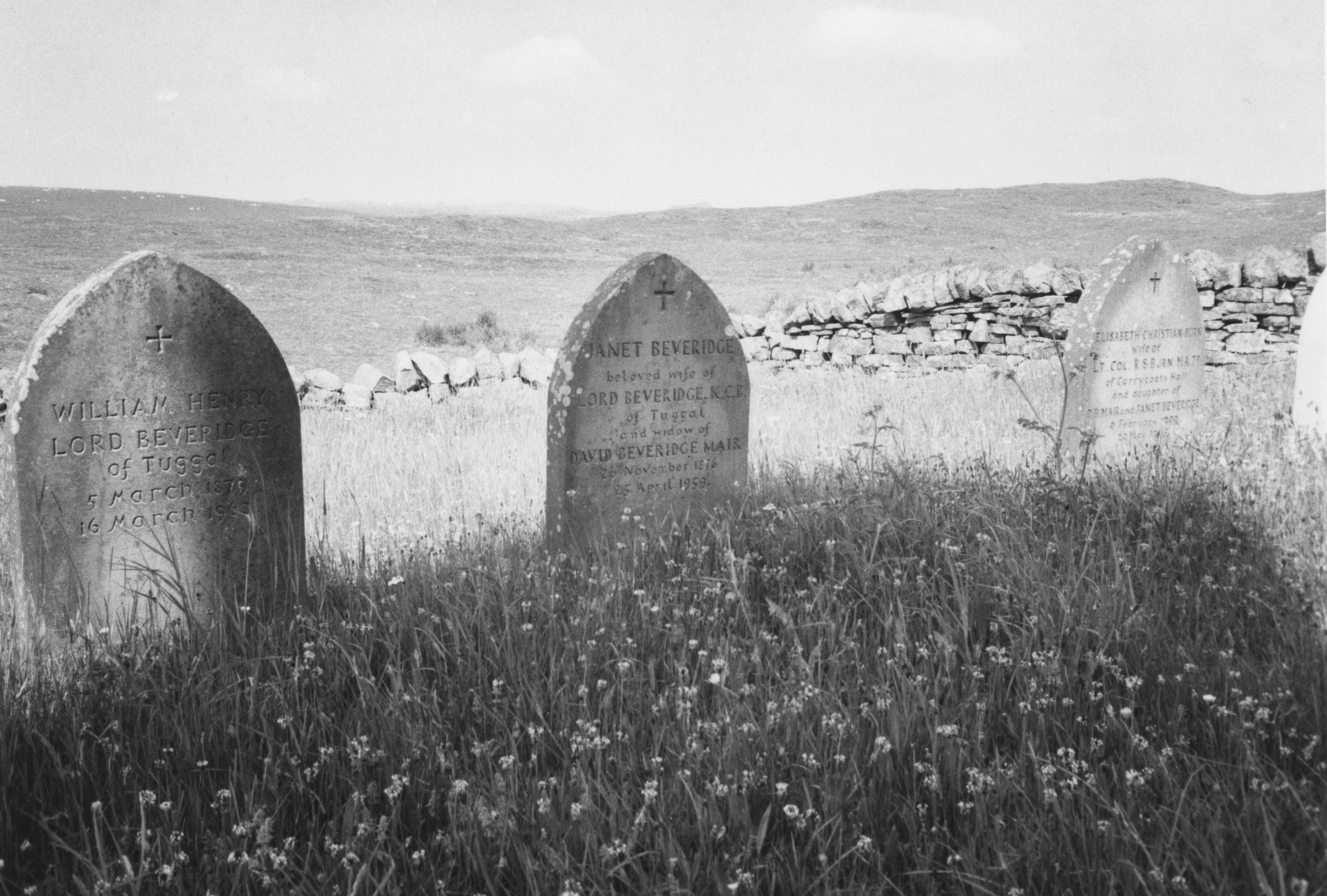
The graves of Lord and Lady Beveridge

Beveridge married the mathematician Janet Philip, daughter of William Philip and widow of David Mair, in 1942. They had worked together in the civil service and at LSE, and she was instrumental in the drafting and publicising of the Beveridge Report.

He died at his home on 16 March 1963, aged 84, and was buried in Thockrington churchyard, on the Northumbrian moors. His barony became extinct upon his death. His last words were "I have a thousand things to do".

== Commemoration and Legacy ==
Beveridge Street in the Christchurch Central City was named for William Beveridge. It was one of 120 streets that were renamed in 1948 by Peter Fraser's Labour Government of New Zealand.

In November 2018, English Heritage unveiled a blue plaque commemorating Beveridge at 27 Bedford Gardens in Campden Hill, London W8 7EF where he lived from 1914 until 1921.

University College, Oxford's society for students studying and tutors involved in the study of Philosophy, Politics and Economics was renamed the Beveridge Society in his honour.

Beveridge is played by Simon Callow in the upcoming film The Man with the Plan about the Beveridge Report.

== Works ==
- Unemployment: A problem of industry, 1909. online (Archive.org)
- 'Wages in the Winchester Manors', Economic History Review, Vol. VII, 1936–37.
- Prices and Wages in England from the Twelfth to the Nineteenth Century, 1939.
- Social Insurance and Allied Services, 1942. (The Beveridge Report)
- The Pillars of Security and Other War-Time Essays and Addresses, 1943, republished 2014.
- Full Employment in a Free Society, 1944.
- The Economics of Full Employment, 1944.
- Why I am a Liberal, 1945.
- The Price of Peace, 1945.
- Voluntary action A report on methods of social advance. London: George Allen & Unwin. 1948.
- Power and Influence, 1953.
- "India Called Them," George Allen & Unwin, 1947
- Plan for Britain: A Collection of Essays prepared for the Fabian Society by G. D. H. Cole, Aneurin Bevan, Jim Griffiths, L. F. Easterbrook, Sir William Beveridge, and Harold J. Laski (Not illustrated with 127 text pages).
- 'Westminster Wages in the Manorial Era', Economic History Review, 2nd Series, Vol. VIII, 1955.

== See also ==
- Aneurin Bevan, Clement Attlee's Health Minister
- Beveridge curve – the relationship between unemployment and the job vacancy rate
- List of liberal theorists
- List of British university chancellors and vice-chancellors
- List of United Kingdom MPs with the shortest service
- List of Vice-Chancellors of the University of London

== Resources ==
- Jose Harris, William Beveridge: A Biography, Oxford University Press, 1997. ISBN 0-19-820685-2.
- Julien Demade, Produire un fait scientifique. Beveridge et le Comité international d'histoire des prix, Paris, Publications de la Sorbonne, 2018. ISBN 979-10-351-0058-2.
- William Beveridge's archives are held at the London School of Economics.
- Photographs of William Beveridge held by LSE Archives
- Donald Markwell, John Maynard Keynes and International Relations: Economic Paths to War and Peace, Oxford University Press, 2006.

Academic offices
Preceded by William Pember Reeves	Director of the London School of Economics; 1919–1937	Succeeded by Alexander Carr-Saunders
Preceded by Ernest Arthur Gardner	Vice-Chancellor of the University of London; 1926–1928	Succeeded by Sir Gregory Foster
Preceded by Arthur Blackburne Poynton	Master of University College, Oxford; 1937–1945	Succeeded by John Wild
Parliament of the United Kingdom
Preceded by George Charles Grey	Member of Parliament for Berwick-upon-Tweed; 1944–1945	Succeeded by Robert Thorp
Peerage of the United Kingdom
New creation	Baron Beveridge; 1946–1963	Extinct
