= Semashko model =

Form of single-payer healthcare

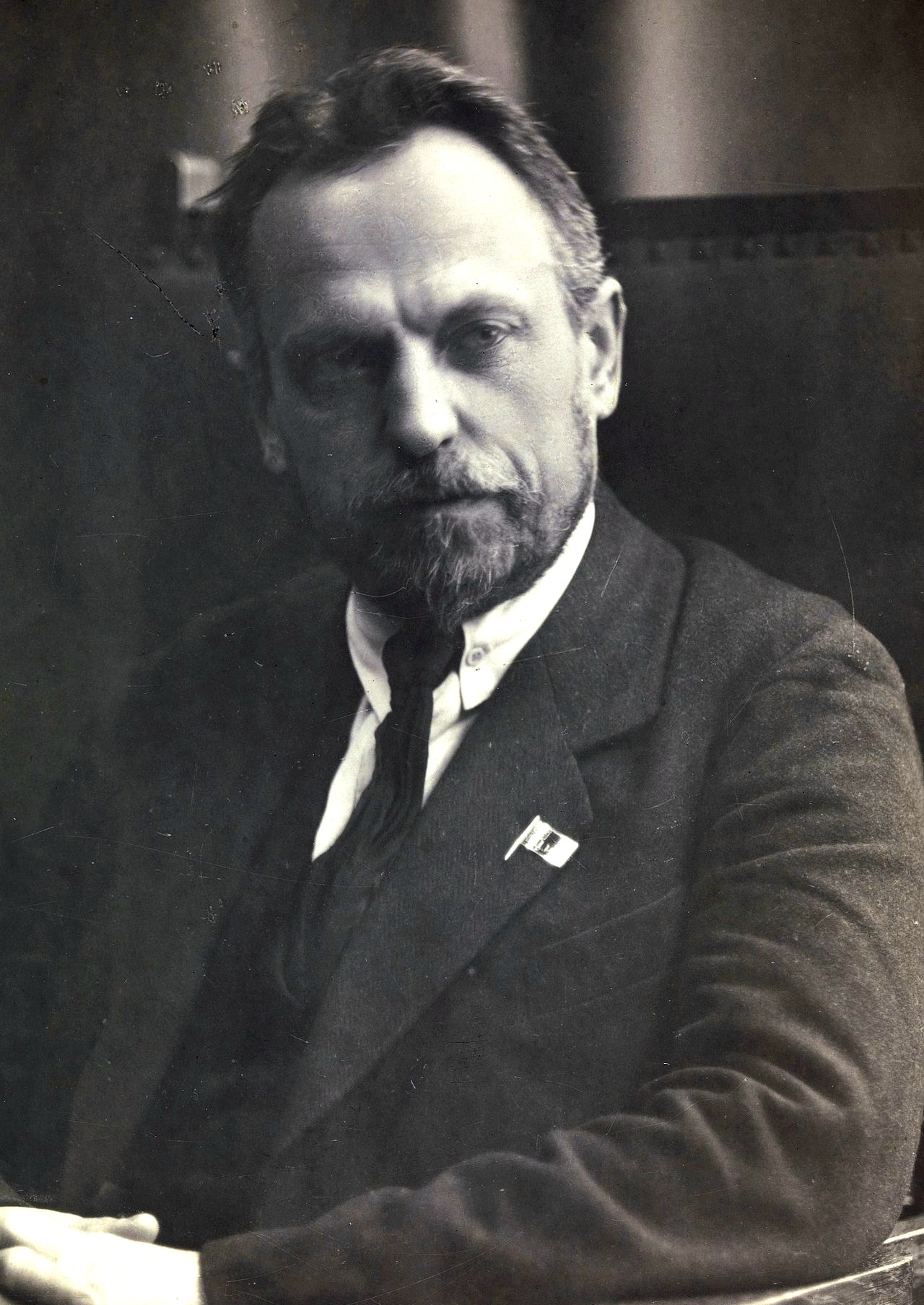
Nikolai Semashko

The Semashko model is a single-payer healthcare system where healthcare is free for everyone, and is funded from the national budget. It has been extensively modified since its introduction, and a number of ex-Soviet countries have now abandoned much of it. It was highly centralised and prescriptive in its design and had a very strong focus on specialist medicine so that family medicine and primary care was underdeveloped.

The Bolsheviks began establishing the system in with a July 1918 decree, nationalizing all existing medical institutions and proclaiming healthcare being available for free for all, thus, at least nominally, establishing the world's first free and universal healthcare system. However, the actual availability of healthcare in the impoverished country after the prolonged civil war and two World Wars, especially in the more remote villages, lagged well into the 1930s, and the practical universality only got established by the 1950s.

The system is named after Nikolai Semashko, a Soviet People's Commissar for Healthcare. The model is largely continued in Russia, most other post-Soviet states (exceptions are Turkmenistan, Kyrgyzstan and the Baltic states), and some other formerly Soviet-aligned states (such as North Korea and Cuba) and is regarded as one of the most influential ones.

== Features ==
In the Semashko model, medical services are provided by a hierarchy of state institutions under the supervision of Ministry of Healthcare and are financed from the national budget. For the country's citizens, medical services are free and equal, with an emphasis on social hygiene and prevention of infectious diseases. The model features publicly owned medical facilities, salaried health workers, large providers of primary healthcare and an exceptionally high degree of governmental administration, providing a universal healthcare. The Semashko model does not allow private medical practices, as all physicians in it are state employees. In the Soviet Union, under this model, all of the country's territory was divided into districts, with outpatient hospitals and local physicians assigned to each of them. These physicians were multi-specialized, able to treat the most common diseases, while more complicated cases were referred to regional hospitals.

A special feature of the Semashko model is the "method of dynamic dispensary surveillance", which holds that every detected case of a serious disease should be subjected to a certain set of guidelines, including planning curative activities, documenting them, ensuring the required number of contacts with specialists, a monitoring process and outcome indicators. Such guidelines were developed at a later stage, in the late 1960s.

== History ==
The Semashko model originated in the aftermath of the 1917 October Revolution. In the United Kingdom, the National Insurance Act 1911 provided coverage for primary care (but not specialist or hospital care) for wage earners, covering about one third of the population. The Russian Empire established a similar system in 1912, and other industrialized countries began following suit. The Semashko model was established in Soviet Russia in 1920. The model substantially improved population health relative to the starting point of its implementation in the late 1920s. However, the model was less effective against non-communicable diseases and as such failed to advance population health further.

== See also ==
- Bismarck model
- Beveridge model
- Health system
