= Euro Health Consumer Index =

European health quality index

Euro Health Consumer Index (EHCI) was a comparison of European health care systems based on waiting times, results, and generosity. The information is presented as a graphic index. EHCI was produced 2005–2009 and 2012–2018 by Health Consumer Powerhouse. The 2014 ranking included 37 countries measured by 48 indicators. It claimed to measure the "consumer friendliness" of healthcare systems. It did not claim to measure which European state had the best healthcare system, but it did produce specialist Indexes on Diabetes, Cardiac Care, HIV, Headache and Hepatitis.

In 2006, France was the champion with 768 points out of 1000. In the 2015 results, the same performance would have given the 13th position among 35 countries because of the widespread improvements in standards.

While no bias in favour of any health system was alleged, the index was criticised in the British Medical Journal by Martin McKee and others from the European Observatory on Health Systems and Policies in February 2016. Points they made included:

- The index is constructed by scoring performance as good, intermediary or not-so-good, based on arbitrary cut-off points.
- There is no logic in how many points are allocated to each indicator. 225 points are allocated to accessibility, but only 250 to health outcomes.
- The indicators are a mix of trends over time and cross-sectional rankings.

A survey by the Centre for Population Change in 2019 produced results consistent with the index.

== Euro Health Consumer Index 2018 ==
Euro Health Consumer Index 2018
Country	Overall ranking	Total score	Patient rights and information score	Accessibility (waiting times for treatment) score	Outcomes score	Range and reach of services score	Prevention score	Pharmaceuticals score
Switzerland	1	893	113	225	278	99	95	83
Netherlands	2	883	125	175	256	125	113	89
Norway	3	857	125	138	278	120	119	78
Denmark	4	855	121	175	267	120	95	78
Belgium	5	849	104	213	244	115	101	72
Finland	6	839	113	150	278	120	101	78
Luxembourg	7	809	100	188	244	109	95	72
Sweden	8	800	117	113	267	125	101	78
Austria	9	799	108	175	244	104	89	78
Iceland	10	797	121	188	222	104	107	56
France	11	796	104	188	233	104	83	83
Germany	12	785	104	163	244	83	101	89
Portugal	13	754	108	163	222	94	89	78
Czechia	14	731	108	175	211	104	71	61
Estonia	15	729	121	188	189	94	77	61
United Kingdom	16	728	117	100	211	109	113	78
Slovakia	17	722	113	188	200	78	77	67
Serbia	18	699	108	200	189	57	83	61
Spain	19	698	96	113	222	94	101	72
Italy	20	687	92	138	233	73	101	50
Slovenia	21	678	88	125	222	94	77	72
Ireland	22	669	83	75	244	94	89	83
Montenegro	23	668	96	188	189	52	71	72
Croatia	24	644	104	125	200	94	71	50
North Macedonia	25	638	113	163	156	63	83	61
Cyprus	26	635	83	150	200	63	83	56
Malta	27	631	88	150	156	104	95	39
Lithuania	28	622	104	163	167	73	71	44
Greece	29	615	67	163	200	52	83	50
Latvia	30	605	100	138	178	68	77	44
Bulgaria	31	591	79	200	167	47	60	39
Poland	32	585	79	138	167	57	89	56
Hungary	33	565	79	113	156	78	95	44
Romania	34	549	96	175	133	52	54	39
Albania	35	544	67	175	156	42	71	33

== Euro Health Consumer Index 2016 ==
Euro Health Consumer Index 2016
Country	Overall ranking	Total score	Patient rights and information score	Accessibility (waiting times for treatment) score	Outcomes score	Range and reach of services score	Prevention score	Pharmaceuticals score
Netherlands	1	927	122	200	288	125	107	86
Switzerland	2	904	111	225	288	94	101	86
Norway	3	865	125	138	288	115	119	81
Belgium	4	860	104	225	250	109	95	76
Iceland	5	854	115	163	288	115	113	62
Luxembourg	6	851	101	200	263	104	107	76
Germany	7	849	104	188	288	83	101	86
Finland	8	842	108	150	288	115	101	81
Denmark	9	827	111	150	275	115	95	81
Austria	10	826	108	200	238	99	101	81
France	11	815	90	188	263	94	95	86
Sweden	12	786	104	100	275	125	101	81
Czech Republic	13	780	87	213	238	104	77	62
Portugal	14	763	108	150	250	78	101	76
United Kingdom	15	761	108	100	250	109	113	81
Slovenia	16	740	104	125	263	89	83	76
Estonia	17	729	108	163	238	94	65	62
Spain	18	709	87	113	238	94	107	71
Croatia	19	703	108	175	188	104	71	57
Macedonia	20	699	118	225	138	68	89	62
Ireland	21	689	80	100	250	78	95	86
Italy	22	682	83	138	225	78	101	57
Slovakia	23	678	97	163	175	89	83	71
Serbia	24	670	111	188	163	57	89	62
Malta	25	666	80	163	188	94	95	48
Cyprus	26	623	73	125	213	68	83	62
Lithuania	27	620	97	175	163	68	65	52
Greece	28	593	63	125	213	52	83	57
Latvia	29	589	87	113	188	73	77	52
Hungary	30	575	73	125	163	73	89	52
Poland	31	564	66	100	188	63	95	52
Albania	32	551	73	163	175	42	65	33
Bulgaria	33	526	66	150	150	47	65	48
Montenegro	34	518	63	113	175	57	77	33
Romania	35	497	80	150	125	52	48	43

== Euro Health Consumer Index 2015 ==
Euro Health Consumer Index 2015
Country	Overall ranking	Total score	Patient rights and information score	Accessibility (waiting times for treatment) score	Outcomes score	Range and reach of services score	Prevention score	Pharmaceuticals score
Netherlands	1	916	146	200	240	144	101	86
Switzerland	2	894	133	225	240	119	101	76
Norway	3	854	146	138	240	138	113	81
Finland	4	845	129	150	229	144	107	86
Belgium	5	836	117	225	198	131	89	76
Luxembourg	6	832	121	200	219	125	101	67
Germany	7	828	125	188	229	94	107	86
Iceland	8	825	133	163	240	125	107	57
Denmark	9	793	133	138	219	138	89	76
Sweden	10	786	125	100	229	144	107	81
France	11	775	113	188	208	106	89	71
Austria	12	774	121	188	188	119	83	76
Czech Republic	13	760	96	213	177	125	83	67
United Kingdom	14	736	129	100	188	131	107	81
Slovenia	15	710	121	125	208	106	83	67
Croatia	16	707	129	175	156	119	65	62
Estonia	17	706	129	163	188	106	54	67
Macedonia	18	704	142	213	104	81	107	57
Spain	19	695	104	113	198	113	101	67
Portugal	20	691	96	113	188	94	89	62
Ireland	21	685	96	100	208	94	101	86
Italy	22	667	96	138	188	88	101	57
Malta	23	663	92	163	135	125	101	48
Slovakia	24	653	113	163	135	94	77	71
Lithuania	25	628	125	175	135	75	65	52
Cyprus	26	595	88	125	177	81	71	52
Hungary	27	578	88	125	125	94	89	57
Greece	28	577	75	125	167	69	89	52
Latvia	29	567	104	113	146	75	77	52
Serbia	30	554	104	138	125	69	71	48
Bulgaria	31	530	75	150	125	56	71	52
Romania	32	527	96	150	104	63	71	43
Albania	33	524	88	163	125	50	65	33
Poland	34	523	79	100	146	63	83	52
Montenegro	35	484	75	113	135	56	71	33

== Euro Health Consumer Index 2014 ==
Euro Health Consumer Index 2014
Country	Overall ranking	Total score	Patient rights and information score	Accessibility (waiting times for treatment) score	Outcomes score	Range and reach of services score	Prevention score	Pharmaceuticals score
Netherlands	1	898	146	188	240	150	89	86
Switzerland	2	855	117	225	229	113	95	76
Norway	3	851	142	138	240	144	107	81
Finland	4	846	133	175	219	138	95	86
Denmark	5	836	142	200	198	131	89	76
Belgium	6	820	100	225	198	138	83	76
Iceland	7	818	138	163	229	125	107	57
Luxembourg	8	814	108	188	219	131	101	67
Germany	9	812	121	188	229	94	95	86
Austria	10	780	125	200	177	119	83	76
France	11	763	117	175	198	113	89	71
Sweden	12	761	117	88	219	150	107	81
Portugal	13	722	133	163	188	94	83	62
England	14	718	129	100	177	131	95	86
Czech Republic	15	715	100	175	177	119	71	71
Scotland	16	710	108	125	177	125	89	86
Macedonia	16	700	138	213	104	94	95	57
Estonia	17	677	121	150	177	119	54	57
Spain	18	670	96	100	188	113	107	67
Slovenia	19	668	96	113	198	106	89	67
Slovakia	20	665	113	175	135	88	83	71
Italy	21	648	104	138	167	88	95	57
Ireland	22	644	83	88	198	100	89	86
Croatia	23	640	104	163	156	100	60	57
Cyprus	24	619	83	150	177	75	71	62
Hungary	25	601	96	163	115	88	83	57
Latvia	26	593	113	150	125	81	71	52
Malta	27	582	88	125	115	113	95	48
Greece	28	561	58	138	156	69	83	57
Bulgaria	29	547	79	163	125	56	71	52
Albania	30	545	92	200	104	50	65	33
Poland	31	511	96	100	104	88	71	52
Lithuania	32	510	104	100	225	81	48	52
Serbia	33	473	83	113	83	69	77	48
Montenegro	34	463	71	113	125	56	65	33
Romania	35	453	83	100	83	63	71	52
Bosnia and Herzegovina	36	420	54	75	115	69	60	48
