= UK parliamentary by-election =

United Kingdom electoral process

In the United Kingdom, a parliamentary by-election occurs following a vacancy arising in the House of Commons. They are often seen as a test of the rival political parties' fortunes between general elections.

== Resignations ==
Members of the House of Commons are not technically permitted to resign. Thus, members wishing to resign or seek re-election are appointed on their own request to an "office of profit under the Crown", either the Steward of the Chiltern Hundreds or the Steward of the Manor of Northstead. Appointment to such an office automatically vacates the Member's seat. A member who resigns in this manner may stand for re-election without resigning from the office of profit.

== Moving the writ for a by-election ==
An election to the House of Commons is formally begun by the issue of a writ by the Clerk of the Crown in Chancery. In the case of a by-election, the Speaker must first issue a warrant to the Clerk of the Crown to allow the Clerk to issue a writ. The most common reason for the Speaker to issue a warrant is that he has been required to do so by a resolution of the House of Commons itself. This requires an MP to move a motion to command the Speaker to issue his warrant. Such motions are moved at the start of proceedings in the House of Commons.

Usual parliamentary convention, codified by the Speaker's Conference in 1973, is that such a motion is moved by the Chief Whip of the party to which the former MP belonged. However, this convention is not always followed, and such a motion can be moved by an MP of another party. This can arise because the former MP did not belong to a party: the writ for the by-election arising from the death of Independent Republican Frank Maguire was moved by Jim Molyneaux, leader of the Ulster Unionist Party; and after Bobby Sands died on hunger strike the writ for a second by-election was moved by Dafydd Elis-Thomas of Plaid Cymru. When all Unionist MPs from Northern Ireland resigned to force by-elections on the Anglo-Irish Agreement, the writs were moved by senior Conservative backbencher Sir Peter Emery.

Since the date on which the writ is issued also fixes the date of the by-election, it is possible (as was done in the Northern Ireland example) to pass a motion requiring the Speaker to issue his warrant on a set future date. This procedure was followed in 1983 when Conservative MP Michael Roberts died on 10 February. On 19 April, Plaid Cymru MP Dafydd Wigley moved that a writ be issued for a by-election in Cardiff North West, explaining that the by-election was being unnecessarily delayed. The Leader of the House of Commons, John Biffen, successfully moved an amendment to provide that the writ would only be issued on 10 May, three months after his death, in accordance with the recommendations of the Speaker's Conference of 1973. In the event, on 9 May the Queen granted a dissolution of Parliament to take place on 13 May; Biffen therefore moved a motion on 10 May to discharge the previous motion. Unnecessary delay was also the explanation given for the decision of the Liberal Democrats to move the writ for the Oldham East and Saddleworth by-election in December 2010, despite the former MP having been from the Labour Party.

As moving a writ for a by-election takes priority over all other business, MPs sometimes use it as a filibustering tactic. This has been done twice by Dennis Skinner; in 1985 he scuppered a Private Member's Bill banning stem-cell research from Enoch Powell by talking extensively when moving the writ for the Brecon and Radnor by-election, and in January 1989 moved the writ for the Richmond (Yorks) by-election and spoke for over three hours so as to prevent Ann Widdecombe from moving a motion to grant extra time to her attempt to restrict abortion laws.

=== Writs in a recess ===
Recess Elections Act 1784 (Note: The citation of this act by this short title was authorised by section 1 of, and the first schedule to, the Short Titles Act 1896. Due to the repeal of those provisions, it is now authorised by section 19(2) of the Interpretation Act 1978.)
- Act of Parliament
- Parliament of Great Britain
- Long title: An Act to repeal so much of Two Acts made in the Tenth and Fifteenth Years of the Reign of His present Majesty, as authorizes the Speaker of the House of Commons to issue his Warrants to the Clerk of the Crown, for making out Writs for the Election of Members to serve in Parliament in the Manner therein mentioned; and for substituting other Provisions for the like Purposes.
- Citation: 24 Geo. 3. Sess. 2. c. 26
- Territorial extent: Great Britain

Dates
- Royal assent: 13 August 1784
- Commencement: 13 August 1784 (Note: Section 1.)
- Repealed: 12 December 1975
Other legislation
Amends	Parliament Act 1775
Repeals/revokes	Recess Elections Act 1770
Amended by	Election of Members during Recess Act 1858; Elections in Recess Act 1863
Repealed by	Recess Elections Act 1975

Status: Repealed

Text of statute as originally enacted

When Parliament is not sitting, the Speaker may be required to issue his writ during a recess. The first legal provision for a by-election writ to be moved in the recess was the Recess Elections Act 1784 (24 Geo. 3. Sess. 2. c. 26), which remained in force until replaced by the Recess Elections Act 1975 on 12 December 1975. The procedure for issuing a writ involves two MPs presenting the Speaker with a certificate stating that there is a vacancy. The Speaker must then publish notice of his receiving the certificate in the London Gazette; six days after inserting the notice in the London Gazette, the Speaker will issue a warrant for the new writ. Recess writs cannot be issued where the vacancy has arisen as a result of an MP resigning. The Speaker is empowered to appoint between three and seven senior MPs to exercise his powers to issue recess writs when he is out of the country or there is no Speaker.

=== Bankruptcy ===
Under section 33 of the Bankruptcy Act 1883 (46 & 47 Vict. c. 52), where a Member of Parliament is declared bankrupt, they are granted a period of six months to discharge themselves. At the end of that time the court which ordered the bankruptcy is required to notify the Speaker, and the seat is vacated. The Speaker is required to insert a notice in the London Gazette of the fact and then to issue a warrant for a new writ after six days.

=== Cancellation ===
If it comes to light that a vacancy has not properly been declared, a writ for a by-election can be cancelled by a further writ of supersedeas. The last such occasion was in 1880 when Henry Strutt (Member for Berwick-upon-Tweed) succeeded to the Peerage as Baron Belper; a writ was issued on 6 July, before Strutt had received a writ of summons to the House of Lords, and so the Liberal Chief Whip moved on 8 July for a writ of supersedeas to be issued.

If the polling day for a by-election is overtaken by a dissolution of Parliament, the writ is automatically cancelled. The most recent cancellation of a planned by-election was in Manchester Gorton which was due to take place on 4 May 2017, on the same day as the local elections, but was cancelled when Prime Minister Theresa May called a snap general election for 8 June 2017 and Parliament was dissolved before 4 May. The previous such occasion was in 1924 when a writ for a by-election in London University was issued during the recess on 22 September 1924. Four candidates were nominated when nominations closed on 1 October, with polling scheduled for 13–17 October. When the government fell over the Campbell Case, the Prime Minister obtained a snap dissolution on 9 October, and the by-election did not take place.

=== Reform ===
A Speaker's Conference on electoral law in 1973 proposed several changes to how by-elections are usually conducted:

1. The Conference, conscious that the intervals before the issue of by-election writs have on occasion been unduly prolonged, put forward the following guidelines:

(a) The motion for a writ for a by-election should normally be moved within three months of a vacancy arising.

(b) It is inexpedient for by-elections to be held in August, or at the time of local elections in April/May, or in the period from mid-December to mid-February before (under present arrangements) a new Register is issued.

(c) Consequently, if this restriction should bring the date of the by-election into one of these periods, the by-election should if practicable be held earlier. If this is impractical the period should be lengthened by the shortest possible additional time. The total period (from vacancy to the moving of the writ) should not be more than four months.

(d) In the fifth year of a Parliament, some relaxation of these guidelines should be allowed, in order if possible to avoid by-elections being held immediately before a general election.

The Speaker's Conference recommended that these provisions should be embodied in a resolution of the House, but no such resolution has been proposed.

== Political significance ==
By-elections are often seen as tests of the popularity of the government of the day, and attract considerable media attention. Voters, knowing that the result will rarely overturn a government's majority in the Commons, may vote differently from their normal voting patterns at general elections. By-elections may reflect specific local issues, and often have lower turnout. Thus large changes in vote share can happen, and the results of by-elections can affect or highlight political parties' fortunes, as with the sequence of by-election victories by the Liberal Party in 1972–3, and the SNP's win in the 1967 Hamilton by-election.

In some cases, an MP or MPs may deliberately trigger a by-election to make a political point, as when all the sitting Unionist MPs in Northern Ireland resigned together in 1986 or as occurred in the 2008 Haltemprice and Howden by-election.

== Notable elections ==
Some notable by-elections include:

- 2026 Clacton: Reform UK leader Nigel Farage stood after resigning as MP in this seat following ongoing investigations into the party's financing. All other major parties did not field a candidate, so the main opponent to Farage was the novelty candidate Count Binface, who came in second with 27% of the vote.
- 2026 Makerfield: Greater Manchester mayor Andy Burnham stood for the by-election in order to be elected as MP and thereby to launch a leadership challenge against the Prime Minister. It was the first time since 1965 that a by-election had been triggered specifically for an individual to enter Parliament.
- 2026 Gorton and Denton: The first time the Green Party won a UK parliamentary by-election, and their first MP for the North of England, reflecting the nationwide "Green surge". It was also a rare three-way battle between parties in a by-election that flipped the safe Labour seat.
- 2025 Runcorn and Helsby: The first time Reform UK won a by-election, by the smallest majority ever for a by-election winning only by 6 votes.
- 2024 Rochdale: George Galloway from the Workers Party won the by-election. The first by-election in Great Britain since the 1945 Combined Scottish Universities by-election at which the two best-performing candidates were not from the Conservative, Labour, or Liberal Democrat parties.
- 2023 Mid Bedfordshire: The largest-ever majority from a previous general election was overturned at this by-election.
- 2021 North Shropshire: The Conservative Party lost the seat, which Conservatives had held for all but two of the last 189 years, to the Liberal Democrats with a 34% swing.
- 2021 Hartlepool: The Conservative Party won the seat for the first time since 1959, and the first woman to represent the seat.
- 2017 Copeland: The Conservative Party gained the seat despite it having been held by Labour since its creation. This was the first by-election gain for a government since 1982.
- 2016 Richmond Park: The incumbent Conservative MP Zac Goldsmith resigned in protest at Heathrow Airport third runway proposal by the government. The by-election was held less than half a year after the Brexit referendum, in which the constituency was heavily in favour of Remain. Goldsmith, who advocated Leave, ran as an independent and was defeated by the Liberal Democrat candidate.
- 2008 Glasgow East: Labour lost its third safest Scottish seat to the SNP at a time when the Labour government's popularity was declining, of the credit crunch, and with Britain on the verge of its first recession since the early 1990s.
- 2008 Haltemprice and Howden: Conservative's former Shadow Home Secretary David Davis resigned to trigger a by-election, in order to spark a wider debate on the issue of civil liberties. He was not opposed by Labour nor by the Liberal Democrats. The number of candidates was the greatest in a Westminster election.
- 1997 Wirral South: Labour Party gained the seat from the Conservatives which left the Conservative government without a majority, just over two months before the general election in which Labour won by a landslide to end 18 years of Conservative government.
- 1990 Eastbourne: The incumbent Conservative MP, Ian Gow, was killed by the IRA, and in the by-election the seat was lost to the Liberal Democrats. This by-election came in the final weeks of Margaret Thatcher's eleven years as prime minister, when the Conservative government was trailing Labour in the opinion polls largely due to the recent introduction of poll tax.
- 1986 Northern Ireland: Unionist MPs resigned over the Anglo-Irish Agreement. All but one of the incumbent MPs were re-elected.
- 1983 Bermondsey: The campaign was described as the "dirtiest, most violent and homophobic" in modern times, with homophobic attacks from supporters of the Liberal Party, Labour Party, far-right, and from tabloid press. Tatchell claimed he was assaulted in the street over 100 times while canvassing and received death threats. Liberal candidate Simon Hughes won the seat with a 44.2% swing against the Labour candidate Peter Tatchell, which was the largest by-election swing in British history. Hughes later apologised to Tatchell and came out as bisexual in 2006.
- 1982 Glasgow Hillhead: Former Labour Home Secretary, and then leader of the SDP, Roy Jenkins, re-entered parliament, months after narrowly missing out in 1981 Warrington by-election. Tam Galbraith, whose death triggered the by-election, became the last Conservative MP to represent a Glasgow constituency.
- 1979 Liverpool Edge Hill: This by-election was held a day after Prime Minister James Callaghan lost the no-confidence motion by 1 vote, and therefore slightly over a month before the 1979 general election (so, in essence, the by-election was held after the Parliament was set for dissolution). The Liberal Party gained the seat from Labour (which it had been continuously winning since 1945) whose incumbent MP Arthur Irvine had died in December 1978.
- 1977 Birmingham Stechford: This by-election saw the formal loss of majority of Prime Minister James Callaghan's Labour government. The by-election was scheduled following the resignation of incumbent MP and former Home Secretary Roy Jenkins who had been appointed as President of the European Commission. In a shock result, the Conservative candidate Andrew MacKay wrested the seat from Labour which had continuously won there since 1950. As a result of the by-election, the Labour Party was forced to enter into a pact with the Liberal Party known as the Lib–Lab pact. The pact would last until September 1978, saving the government from being defeated in no-confidence motions on multiple occasions.
- 1967 Hamilton: Riding on the rise of popularity for Welsh and Scottish Nationalist movements, the SNP reached third place in the 1967 Glasgow Pollok by-election where they gained 28%. SNP then won the Hamilton by-election. It is often considered to be the beginning of the modern SNP: they would then gained control of their first local council, while the national vote share for the SNP more than doubled in the 1970 general election, and the SNP has continuously been represented in parliament ever since.
- 1966 Caerfyrddin: Plaid Cymru won their first parliamentary seat in Caerfyrddin by Gwynfor Evans. Their campaign focused mainly around the erosion of the Welsh culture and language, and Welsh nationalism. The by-election triggered a surge in popularity for the party as the party would come second behind Labour in the 1967 Rhondda West, the 1968 Caerphilly, and the 1972 Merthyr Tydfil by-elections. The Scottish Nationalist Party would also experience significant breakthroughs electorally. In the 1970 general election, the vote share for Plaid Cymru would triple.
- 1965 Leyton: This is one of the few by-elections when an incumbent Cabinet Minister was defeated. Patrick Gordon Walker was appointed Foreign Secretary even losing the constituency of Smethwick in the 1964 general election which was notoriously racist with the Conservative candidate claiming "If you want a nigger for a neighbour, vote Liberal or Labour." A vacancy was created in the safe seat of Leyton after the incumbent Reginald Sorensen was elevated to the House of Lords. In a shock result, the Conservative Party candidate won the seat by Labour by a margin of 205 votes, forcing Gordon Walker to step down as Foreign Secretary and reducing the majority of the Labour government to just 2.
- 1963 Kinross and Western Perthshire: This remains the only by-election in which an incumbent Prime Minister, Sir Alec Douglas-Home was one of the candidates. The seat had become vacant following the death of Scottish Office Minister Gilmour Leburn. The Conservative Party had originally selected George Younger as its candidate for the by-election, but replaced him with Douglas-Home following his sudden and unexpected ascension to the Premiership (as convention dictates that a Prime Minister should be a member of the House of Commons). Douglas-Home, then known as Lord Home, disclaimed his peerage under Peerage Act 1963 to stand in the by-election. Between 23 October (the date he renounced his peerage) and 7 November 1963 (the date he was elected to the House of Commons), Sir Alec Douglas-Home set the record of having become the only Prime Minister to not serve as a member of either house of Parliament.
- 1961 and 1963 Bristol South East: Tony Benn, the incumbent Labour MP of constituency lost his position in 1971 following his inheritance of the hereditary peerage Viscount Stansgate after the death of his father. Nevertheless, Benn went on to contest the by-election from the constituency, winning by a margin of 13,044 votes. Despite the win, Benn was forbidden by the Parliament authorities to attend the Commons due to his ineligible status as a hereditary peer. The Conservative Party candidate Malcolm St Clair filed a petition against the result, and was declared the winner after a court challenge. The court ruled the election to be invalid as the voters were aware that Benn was legally disqualified from sitting in the House of Commons and hence their votes would be counted as being "thrown away"; thus declaring Malcolm St Clair, the runner-up candidate as the new MP. Following the passage of the Peerage Act 1963, Malcolm St Clair, the incumbent Conservative MP of the constituency agreed to resign to pave the way for a by-election to honour the decision of the electorate in the 1961 by-election. Benn renounced his peerage and contested as a Labour candidate. He would go on to win the constituency by a comfortable majority where the Conservatives did not field a candidate in the by-election, an occurrence that would be next seen only in 2016.
- 1903 Barnard Castle: After the death of Liberal MP Sir Joseph Pease, the newly formed Labour Party selected Arthur Henderson to run in the by-election. The by-election was a tight three-way battle between them, the Conservatives and the Liberals, an extremely unusual by-election for the time. Henderson would win over the Conservative candidate by just 47 votes, despite the 2,803 Liberal votes splitting the left wing of the electorate. This was the first Labour gain with both Liberal and Conservative opposition.
- 1769 Middlesex: Following his expulsion from Parliament, Radical journalist John Wilkes was repeatedly re-elected in a series of by-elections in Middlesex, with Parliament voiding each result. After his third re-election, Parliament ordered the result overturned and the seat transferred to Wilkes's Tory opponent, Henry Luttrell. The events caused a national controversy, and played an important role in the development of British radicalism.

== See also ==
- United Kingdom by-election records, for a list of exceptional results and records in the history of by-elections in the United Kingdom
- List of United Kingdom by-elections (2010–present), for a list of by-election results since 2010
- List of UK parliamentary election petitions
