= 1984 Chesterfield by-election =

UK parliamentary by-election

- 1 March 1984

Chesterfield constituency
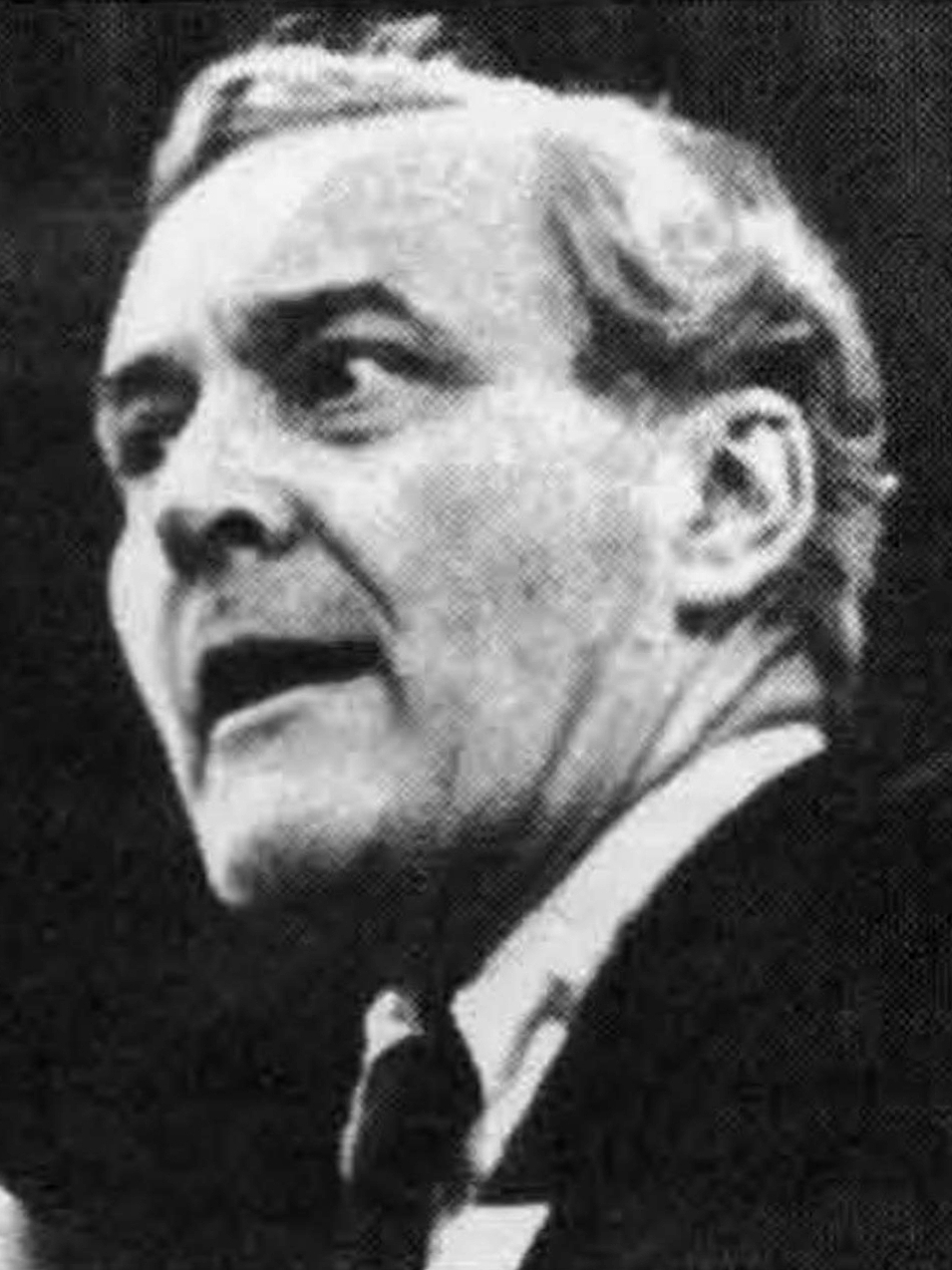

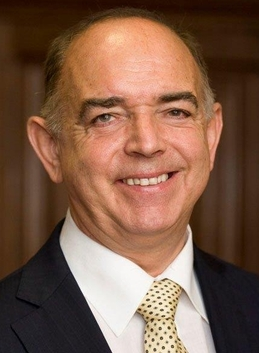
	First party	Second party	Third party
Candidate	Tony Benn	Max Payne	Nick Bourne
Party	Labour	Liberal	Conservative
Popular vote	24,633	18,369	8,028
Percentage	46.5%	34.7%	15.2%
Swing	▼1.6%	▲15.1%	▼17.3%
MP before election
Eric Varley
Labour
Elected MP
Tony Benn
Labour

The 1984 Chesterfield by-election was held on 1 March 1984 for a seat in the House of Commons to represent Chesterfield in Derbyshire. This followed the resignation of the sitting Labour Member of Parliament (MP) Eric Varley.

The eventual winner, former Labour cabinet minister Tony Benn (who had been ousted from parliament at the general election nine months earlier) defeated sixteen other candidates, at the time the largest fielded in a British by-election — surpassing the previous high of twelve, at the 1981 Croydon North West by-election. This record would remain unbroken until the 1993 Newbury by-election.

At the time, there was no requirement for political parties fielding candidates to be registered, resulting in some fringe candidates using slogans or frivolous titles as their party name. Actor Bill Maynard finished in fourth place, standing as an "independent Labour" supporter who opposed Benn's candidacy in Chesterfield. Other candidates included: John Davey, who ran in opposition to increases in the charges for NHS dentistry, Helen Anscomb, a by-election veteran who called for freight to be transported by rail to improve road safety, Donald Butler, a furniture shop owner who adopted the slogan "a Chesterfield for Chesterfield", Giancarlo Piccaro stood for the 'Official Acne Party', pretending to be dedicated to the eradication of zits worldwide, T. A. Layton stood in the name of the "Spare the Earth Ecology Party", which he had founded, and David Cahill campaigned for The Sun to be treated as a comic.

Chesterfield was Benn's fourth by-election victory. He had first entered Parliament at the 1950 Bristol South East by-election and held that seat until he was disqualified from the Commons in 1960, when he inherited a peerage, as Viscount Stansgate, upon his father's death. At the resulting 1961 Bristol South East by-election, he won with an increased majority of votes, but because he was ineligible to take his seat, the Conservative candidate Malcolm St Clair was declared elected. When the law was changed to allow peerages to be renounced, St Clair resigned the seat and Benn won the 1963 Bristol South East by-election.

== Result ==
Chesterfield by-election, 1984
Party	Candidate	Votes	%	±%
Labour	Tony Benn	24,633	46.5	−1.6
Liberal	Max Payne	18,369	34.7	+15.1
Conservative	Nick Bourne	8,028	15.2	−17.3
Independent Labour	Bill Maynard	1,355	2.6	New
Monster Raving Loony	David Sutch	178	0.3	New
Four-wheel drive Hatchback Road Safety	David Bentley	116	0.2	New
Independent	John Davey	83	0.3	New
Independent Ecology Party	Thomas Layton	46	0.1	New
Independent - Freight on rails not roads	Helen Anscomb	34	0.1	New
Yoga and Meditation	Jitendra Bardwaj	33	0.1	New
Independent - Buy your Chesterfield in Thame Party	Donald Butler	24	0.1	New
The Welshman	Paul Nicholls-Jones	22	0.0	New
Elvisly Yours Elvis Presley Party	Sid Shaw	20	0.0	New
I am not a number	Christopher Hill	17	0.0	New
Acne Party	Giancarlo Piccaro	15	0.0	New
Re-classify The Sun newspaper a comic	David Cahill	12	0.0	New
Peace	John Connell	7	0.0	New
Majority		6,264	11.8	−3.8
Turnout		52,992	76.9	+4.3
Labour hold		Swing		

== See also ==
- Lists of United Kingdom by-elections
