= Sir Andrew Clark, 3rd Baronet =

British Army officer and barrister

Sir Andrew Edmund James Clark, 3rd Baronet, MBE, MC, QC (18 July 1898 – 19 May 1979) was a British Army officer and barrister, described as "the leading advocate of at the Chancery Bar" by The Times.

== Early life ==
Andrew Clark was the son of Colonel Sir James Richardson Andrew Clark, Bt. and the grandson of the prominent doctor Sir Andrew Clark, 1st Baronet. Clark was educated at Eton College. He did not proceed to university owing to the outbreak of the First World War. Instead, he was commissioned into the Royal Field Artillery in 1916. He saw service in France and Belgium, and was awarded the Military Cross. He left the British Army in 1921, and according to The Times, "there followed seven years which his biographer would find it hard to document but which certainly enlarged his horizon and experience."

== Legal career ==
After completing his studies by correspondence from Monte Carlo, Clark was called to the Bar by the Inner Temple in 1928, and joined Lincoln's Inn in 1930. After a pupillage with Raymond Evershed (later Lord Evershed), he joined the Chancery Bar and built a successful practice. In 1939, he was recalled to military service, and served in a number of senior administrative posts. He reached the rank of lieutenant colonel and honorary brigadier and was appointed a Member of the Order of the British Empire.

Clark became a King's Counsel in 1943 and was elected Bencher of the Inner Temple in 1951. In 1945, he stood as the Conservative Party candidate for Barnet, but lost narrowly to the Labour candidate.

Returning to legal practice in 1945, Clark was involved in high-profile cases such as the Bank Rate Tribunal and the Profumo affair. In 1953, he conducted the inquiry into the Crichel Down affair, which led to the resignation of the Minister of Agriculture, Sir Thomas Dugdale. He inherited his father's baronetcy in 1948. In 1961, he successfully represented The Crown against the election court petition of Viscount Stansgate in Re Bristol South-East Parliamentary Election.

== Family ==
Clark married Angelica Taylor in 1921, but she died the following year. In 1924, he married Adeline Frances Derviche-Jones, daughter of Colonel A. D. Derviche-Jones; they had two daughters. Clark died in 1979, when the baronetcy became extinct.
