= Re Bristol South-East Parliamentary Election =

United Kingdom lawsuit

Re Bristol South-East Parliamentary Election 1961
- Court: Election court
- Citation: [1964] 2 QB 257, [1961] 3 All ER 354

Case history
- Related action: Peerage Act 1963

Court membership
- Judges sitting: Mr Justice Gorman, Mr Justice McNair

Keywords
- disclaiming peerages

Re Bristol South-East Parliamentary Election ([1964] 2 QB 257, [1961] 3 All ER 354) is a 1961 United Kingdom election court case brought about by an election petition by Malcolm St Clair against Anthony Wedgwood Benn, 2nd Viscount Stansgate (also known as Tony Benn), the winner of the 1961 Bristol South-East by-election where Benn had won the most votes but was disqualified from taking his seat in the House of Commons as he had inherited a hereditary peerage as 2nd Viscount Stansgate. Benn argued that as he had not applied for a writ of summons, he was not a member of the House of Lords and that the voters had the right to choose who they wanted to represent them.

The court made a ruling of undue election because the voters were aware that Benn was legally disqualified from sitting in the House of Commons, their votes had to be counted as being "thrown away" and Malcolm St Clair as the runner-up would take the seat instead.

== Background ==
Anthony Wedgwood Benn had been elected as the MP for Bristol South East since 1950 as a Labour Party candidate. During that time he was heir to the Viscount Stansgate title held by his father William Wedgwood Benn, 1st Viscount Stansgate, which Benn tried several times to renounce his right to. When his father died in 1960, Benn called the Speaker of the House of Commons to inform him of this. The Speaker told Benn that because he was now legally a peer, he was disqualified from sitting and speaking in the House of Commons. A by-election was called and Benn decided to fight it anyway. The Conservative Party candidate, Malcolm St Clair, ran several adverts in local papers telling voters that there was no point in voting for Benn as he was disqualified from sitting in the House of Commons as he was a hereditary peer. Despite this, Benn won the election and went to the door of the House of Commons to take his oath of allegiance. However the doorkeeper of the House had been told by the Speaker to not allow Benn access, specifically authorising the use of force to prevent him entering, because he was not legally allowed in the Commons as a hereditary peer.

St Clair issued an election petition against the results stating that Benn could not take his seat as he was disqualified. The petition was accepted by the Queen's Bench Division of the High Court of Justice of England and Wales and the case would be heard by an election court. During the two months preceding the case, Benn along with his sons Stephen and Hilary, and his legal advisor Michael Zander were granted permission by the Speaker to access the House of Commons Library to help with their case.

== Court hearing ==
Against legal advice of the Labour Party's Queen's Counsels, Benn represented himself in pro per during the proceedings. Benn took 22 hours to make his opening address and took 537 questions while doing so. Sir Andrew Clark QC, acting as St Clair's barrister argued in his response that a peer upon succession, regardless of whether they had asked for one or not, was entitled to a writ of summons to the House of Lords which the Crown could not refuse to grant. He argued that merely having that right was grounds for disqualification as being a member of the House of Lords was incompatible with being an MP in the House of Commons.

Benn argued that to expel an elected member of the House of Commons on the grounds that he had the right for a writ of summons, was to punish him for doing something he had not done. He cited that there was no precedent to punish a hereditary peer for refusing a writ of summons and referenced the Garter King of Arms's Register of Lords Spiritual and Temporal, where there were forty instances in 500 years of peers not claiming their right to a writ. Since 1955, if a peer did not reply to the Lord Chancellor in relation to their right, they were deemed to be on a leave of absence and attendance was not expected.

== Verdict ==
Mr Justice Gorman and Mr Justice McNair delivered their verdict, which took two hours to read out. During it they praised Benn for "the magnificent way he had presented his case". However, they found the election of Benn to be undue, as he had succeeded his father as Viscount Stansgate and thus, as a hereditary peer, was disqualified from being elected to the House of Commons. They stated that a hereditary peerage was "an incorporeal hereditament affixed to your blood and annexed for posterity". They made their judgement in favour of St Clair as because the voters knew that Benn was disqualified during the election campaign, their votes were to be treated as being "thrown away" as they had been given notice by St Clair of Benn's ineligibility. Benn's attempts to renounce his title were stated as being too technical for voters to have easily understood. As a result, St Clair was elected in place of Benn.

== Aftermath ==
Despite losing the court case, Benn continued to campaign to be able to renounce his peerage. The Peerage Act 1963 was passed which allowed for hereditary peers to disclaim their peerage and surrender their right to sit in the House of Lords. This act was created partially as a result of Benn's campaign but also because of the Conservative Party wishing for either Alec Douglas-Home, Earl of Home or Quintin Hogg, Viscount Hailsham to become Prime Minister and it was considered constitutionally inappropriate for the Prime Minister to sit in the House of Lords. Benn took the opportunity to disclaim his title 22 minutes after the bill had come into law. St Clair, acting pursuant to a promise he made to respect the wishes of the people of his constituency, agreed to take the position of Crown Steward and Bailiff of the Manor of Northstead, an office of profit under the Crown, in order to disqualify himself from his seat. This forced a by-election which Benn won, allowing him to reclaim his seat in the House of Commons. Benn left the House of Commons for the last time in 2001. At the time, hints were dropped to Benn to see if he would take a life peerage to enter the House of Lords but Benn rebuffed them saying "I wouldn't be seen dead in the place".
