= 1950 Bristol South East by-election =

UK parliamentary by-election

- 30 November 1950

Bristol South East constituency
- Turnout: 61.2% (▼23.9 pp)
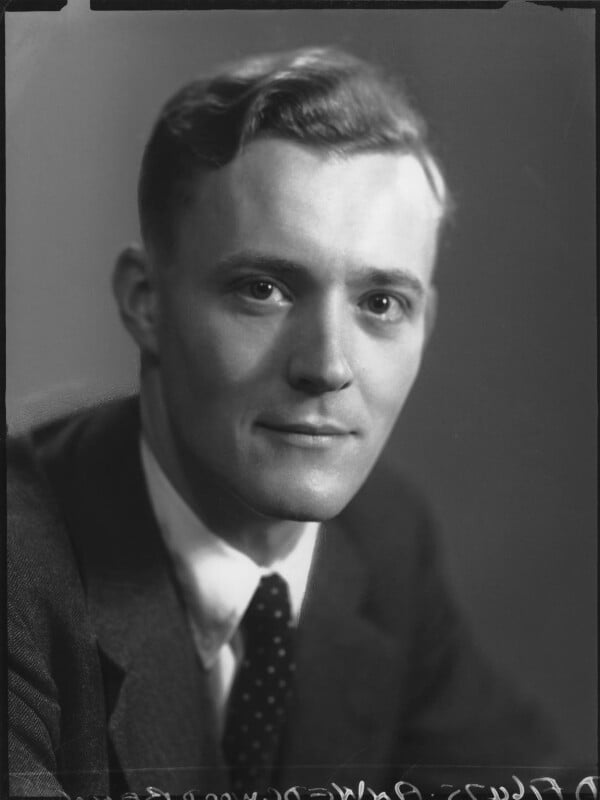
	First party	Second party	Third party
		Con	LIB
Candidate	Tony Benn	James Lindsay	Doreen Gorsky
Party	Labour	Conservative	Liberal
Popular vote	19,367	12,018	2,752
Percentage	54.6%	35.2%	8.1%
Swing	▼5.9 pp	▲8.4 pp	▼1.4 pp
MP before election
Stafford Cripps
Labour
Elected MP
Tony Benn
Labour

The 1950 Bristol South East by-election was a by-election held on 30 November 1950 for the UK House of Commons constituency of Bristol South East in the city of Bristol. The seat had become vacant when the constituency's Labour Member of Parliament (MP) Sir Stafford Cripps had resigned from Parliament due to ill-health.

The Labour candidate Tony Benn held the seat for his party. It was the first of four by-election victories for Benn in the course of his 45-year career in Parliament, the others being Bristol South East in 1961, the same seat in 1963 and Chesterfield in 1984.

== Result ==
Bristol South East by-election, 30th November 1950
Party	Candidate	Votes	%	±%
Labour	Tony Benn	19,367	56.7	−5.9
Conservative	James Lindsay	12,018	35.2	+8.4
Liberal	Doreen Gorsky	2,752	8.1	−1.4
Majority		7,349	21.5	−14.3
Turnout		34,137	61.1	−23.9
Labour hold		Swing	−7.2	

== See also ==
- Tony Benn
- Bristol South East constituency
- 1961 Bristol South East by-election
- 1963 Bristol South East by-election
- Lists of United Kingdom by-elections
