= Bristol South East =

Parliamentary constituency in the United Kingdom, 1950–1983

- Former borough constituency for the House of Commons

1950–1983
- Seats: one
- Created from: Bristol East
- Replaced by: Bristol East, Bristol South and Kingswood

Bristol South East was a constituency (Note: A borough constituency (for the purposes of election expenses and type of returning officer)) in the city of Bristol that returned one Member of Parliament (MP) to the House of Commons of the Parliament of the United Kingdom. (Note: As with all constituencies from the 1950s the constituency elected one Member of Parliament (MP) by the first past the post system of elections which are held at least every five years.)

The constituency was created for the 1950 general election, mainly from the Bristol East constituency, and abolished for the 1983 general election which saw the reintroduction of Bristol East. In boundary changes for the February 1974 general election, part of the constituency's territory was transferred to the new seat of Kingswood.

Sir Stafford Cripps won the seat comfortably from holding its main predecessor in 1950 and continued in government with the new seat for just over six months (he was at the time Chancellor of the Exchequer) before resigning from Parliament for health reasons. The final MP for the constituency was Tony Benn who served as Secretary of State (for Industry from 1974 to 1975 then as Secretary of State For Energy from 1975 to 1979), in the latter role, the UK saw the Winter of Discontent and power shortages. Benn ran in the near-overlapping successor seat, Bristol East in 1983 and was defeated by Conservative candidate Jonathan Sayeed. (Note: Tony Benn returned to the House of Commons at a by-election in 1984, elected to serve Chesterfield.)

== Boundaries ==
1950–1955: The County Borough of Bristol wards of Brislington, Hengrove, St George East, and St George West.

1955–1974: The County Borough of Bristol wards of Brislington, St George East, St George West, and Stockwood, and the Urban District of Kingswood.

1974–1983: The County Borough of Bristol wards of Brislington, Knowle, St George East, St George West, Stockwood, and Windmill Hill.

== Members of Parliament ==
Election	Member	Party
1950	Sir Stafford Cripps	Labour
1950 by-election	Tony Benn	Labour
1961 (on petition)	Malcolm St Clair	Conservative
1963 by-election	Tony Benn	Labour
1983	constituency abolished: see Bristol East	

== Elections ==
=== Elections in the 1950s ===
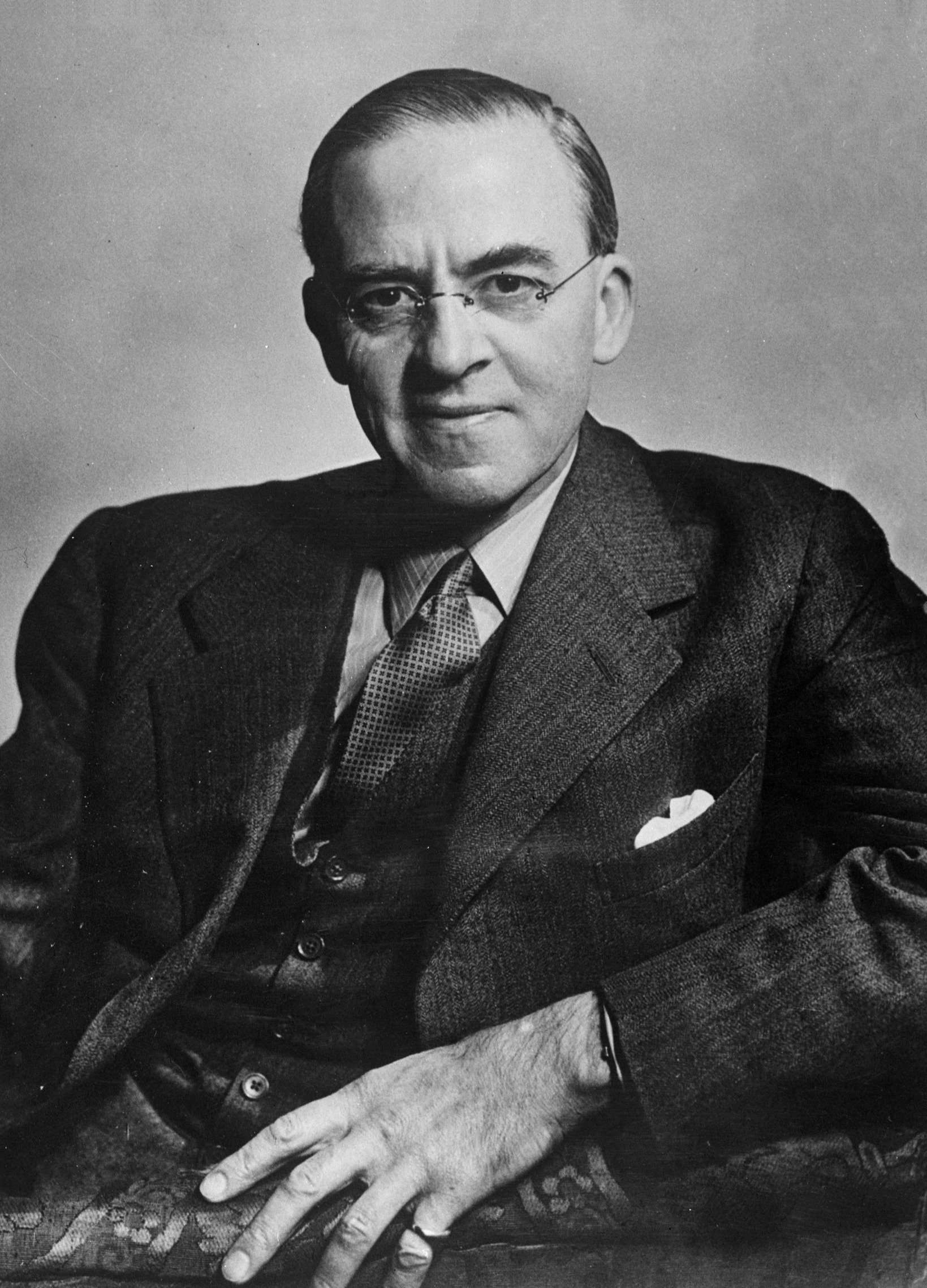
Cripps

General election 1950: Bristol South East
Party	Candidate	Votes	%	±%
Labour	Stafford Cripps	29,393	62.6	
Conservative	R. E. Simms	12,590	26.8	
Liberal	Frederick John Goudge	4,463	9.5	
Communist	Jack Webb	524	1.1	
Majority		16,803	35.8	
Turnout		46,970	85.0	
Labour win (new seat)				

1950 Bristol South East by-election
Party	Candidate	Votes	%	±%
Labour	Tony Benn	19,367	56.7	−5.9
Conservative	James Lindsay	12,018	35.2	+8.4
Liberal	Doreen Gorsky	2,752	8.1	−1.4
Majority		7,349	21.5	−14.3
Turnout		34,137	61.1	−23.9
Labour hold		Swing	−7.2	

General election 1951: Bristol South East
Party	Candidate	Votes	%	±%
Labour	Tony Benn	30,811	65.0	+2.4
Conservative	James Lindsay	16,555	35.0	+8.2
Majority		14,256	30.0	−5.8
Turnout		47,366	83.8	−1.2
Labour hold		Swing	−2.9	

General election 1955: Bristol South East
Party	Candidate	Votes	%	±%
Labour	Tony Benn	25,257	59.5	−5.5
Conservative	Robert Cooke	17,210	40.5	+5.5
Majority		8,047	19.0	−11.0
Turnout		42,467	77.9	−5.9
Labour hold		Swing	−5.5	

General election 1959: Bristol South East
Party	Candidate	Votes	%	±%
Labour	Tony Benn	26,273	56.2	−3.3
Conservative	Malcolm St Clair	20,446	43.8	+3.3
Majority		5,827	12.4	−6.6
Turnout		46,739	81.4	+3.5
Labour hold		Swing	−3.3	

=== Elections in the 1960s ===
Bristol South East by-election 1961
Party	Candidate	Votes	%	±%
Labour	Tony Benn	23,275	69.5	+13.3
Conservative	Malcolm St Clair	10,231	30.5	−13.3
Majority		-13,044	-39.0	N/A
Turnout		33,506	56.7	−24.7
Conservative gain from Labour		Swing	−13.3	

Tony Benn was declared ineligible to sit in the House of Commons due to him having inherited a peerage, and Malcolm St. Clair was declared elected instead.

Bristol South East by-election 1963
Party	Candidate	Votes	%	±%
Labour	Tony Benn	20,313	79.7	+10.2
National Fellowship Conservative	Edward Martell	4,834	19.0	New
Independent	M. P. Lloyd	287	1.1	New
Independent	G. Pearl	44	0.2	New
Majority		15,479	60.7	N/A
Turnout		25,478	42.2	−14.5
Labour gain from Conservative		Swing		

General election 1964: Bristol South East
Party	Candidate	Votes	%	±%
Labour	Tony Benn	29,117	60.2	+4.0
Conservative	R. Stephen O'Brien	19,282	39.8	−4.0
Majority		9,835	20.4	+8.0
Turnout		48,399	77.9	−1.5
Labour hold		Swing	+4.0	

General election 1966: Bristol South East
Party	Candidate	Votes	%	±%
Labour	Tony Benn	30,851	61.4	+1.2
Conservative	Christopher J.R. Pope	19,435	38.6	−1.2
Majority		11,416	22.8	+2.4
Turnout		50,286	76.2	−1.7
Labour hold		Swing	+1.2	

=== Elections in the 1970s ===
General election 1970: Bristol South East
Party	Candidate	Votes	%	±%
Labour	Tony Benn	29,176	55.4	−6.0
Conservative	Norman G. Reece	23,488	44.6	+6.0
Majority		5,688	10.8	−12.0
Turnout		52,664	72.0	−4.2
Labour hold		Swing	−6.0	

General election February 1974: Bristol South East
Party	Candidate	Votes	%	±%
Labour	Tony Benn	26,540	47.0	−8.4
Conservative	Norman G. Reece	18,628	33.0	−11.6
Liberal	D. R. Grayson	9,870	17.5	New
National Front	R.J. Bale	757	1.3	New
Social Democrat	J.H. Robertson	668	1.2	New
Majority		7,912	14.0	+4.2
Turnout		56,463	81.9	+9.9
Labour hold		Swing	+1.6	

General election October 1974: Bristol South East
Party	Candidate	Votes	%	±%
Labour	Tony Benn	25,978	49.1	+2.1
Conservative	J.P. Godwin	16,605	31.4	−1.6
Liberal	R.S. Wardle	8,987	17.0	−0.5
National Front	R. J. Bale	775	1.5	+0.2
World Middle Classes Party (WMPC)	R. R. Goding	457	0.9	New
Marxist-Leninist (England)	P. Rowe	79	0.2	New
Majority		9,373	17.7	+2.7
Turnout		52,881	76.2	−5.7
Labour hold		Swing	+1.9	

General election 1979: Bristol South East
Party	Candidate	Votes	%	±%
Labour	Tony Benn	24,878	45.4	−3.7
Conservative	J.P. Godwin	22,988	41.9	+10.5
Liberal	N.W.H. Tatam	6,371	11.6	−5.4
National Front	J.D. Dowler	523	1.0	−0.5
More Prosperous Britain	Tom Keen	66	0.1	New
Majority		1,890	3.5	−14.2
Turnout		54,826	78.4	+2.2
Labour hold		Swing	−7.1	

== Notes and references ==
Notes
