= 1963 Bristol South East by-election =

UK parliamentary by-election

- 20 August 1963

Bristol South East constituency
- Turnout: 25,478; 42.2% (▼14.5 pp)
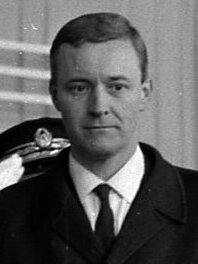
		Ind
Candidate	Tony Benn	Edward Martell
Party	Labour	Independent
Popular vote	20,313	4,834
Percentage	79.7%	19.0%
Swing	▲10.2 pp	New

The 1963 Bristol South East by-election was a by-election held on 20 August 1963 for the British House of Commons constituency of Bristol South East in the city of Bristol.

The seat had become vacant in 1961 when the constituency's Labour Member of Parliament (MP) Tony Benn had inherited a hereditary peerage from his father, becoming Viscount Stansgate and ineligible to serve in the House of Commons. Benn had first been elected at a by-election in 1950 and was re-elected in the next three general elections (the last with 56% of the votes). He stood in the 1961 by-election anyway and won 69.5% of the votes, but due to his known ineligibility, the Conservative Party candidate Malcolm St Clair challenged the result and was declared the winner by the election court over Benn's objections.

When the Peerage Act 1963 changed the law to allow Benn to renounce his peerage, St Clair resigned his seat by being appointed Crown Steward and Bailiff of the Manor of Northstead, triggering the 1963 by-election. The Conservatives did not nominate an official candidate, making this the last by-election in Great Britain in which there was no Conservative candidate until the Batley and Spen by-election in 2016, and the last by-election in Great Britain where the Conservatives did not field a candidate in a held seat until the Richmond Park by-election in 2016. Benn won again, with nearly 80% of the votes.

== Candidates ==
Other than Benn, three candidates stood. Edward Martell was the leader of the National Fellowship. He claimed that the organisation usually supported the Conservatives, but had wanted to use the opportunity to oppose a socialist candidate. He had approached two local businessmen to stand for the group, but they had both declined the nomination. He described the group's policies as traditional Conservative ideals.

Geoffrey Pearl stood as an anti-socialist liberal conservative. Martell met with Pearl before nominations took place, but Pearl was determined to stand. Martell did persuade another anti-socialist, Norman Moggs, to instead support the Fellowship candidate.

Marguerite Lloyd was a housekeeper from Kensington, who had once attempted to become a local election candidate sponsored by the General and Municipal Workers Union. She described her platform as opposing "scandals, murders, robberies, vice and housing rackets". She decided to stand only at the last minute, and spent most of her savings on her deposit. A Mr Elkey of the British Commonwealth Party also arrived at Bristol City Hall in order to nominate himself, but after discovering that Lloyd was on the ballot paper, he decided not to stand.

== Campaign ==
Benn was surprised at how quickly the by-election was organised, and was on holiday for the start of the campaign. He focused his campaign on the need for Parliamentary reform.

Pearl also missed the start of the campaign. He campaigned from a van he parked in the constituency, and could only take press enquiries through his mother in London. He introduced new policies during the campaign, including the abolition of all taxation, other than on luxuries, the simplification of spelling, and a switch to driving on the right side of the road. He tried to withdraw on the day before the election, but was told that his name would have to remain on the ballot paper.

Lloyd declared that she had no policies, but wanted to thank the city, as she had previously been treated in a local hospital, after falling in the Cheddar Gorge. She attended one of Benn's public meetings, sounding a klaxon until she was permitted to speak. Benn gave her fifteen minutes on the platform, during which she accused Benn of being too young, but her speech was largely ridiculed by the crowd.

Martell asked the police to investigate threatening phone calls which he had received. He persuaded the Bristol South East Conservative Association to join his campaign, even though national Conservatives had called on their supporters not to vote against Benn.

== Result ==
Benn was elected, with almost 80% of the votes cast. Martell became the first independent candidate in 17 years to hold his deposit.

Bristol South East by-election, 1963
Party	Candidate	Votes	%	±%
Labour	Tony Benn	20,313	79.7	+10.2
National Fellowship Conservative	Edward Martell	4,834	19.0	New
Independent	Marguerite Lloyd	287	1.1	New
Independent	Geoffrey Pearl (Note: Pearl withdrew on the eve of poll, to support Martell.)	44	0.2	New
Majority		15,479	60.7	N/A
Turnout		25,478	42.2	−14.5
Labour gain from Conservative		Swing		

== See also ==
- Tony Benn
- Bristol South East constituency
- 1950 Bristol South East by-election
- 1961 Bristol South East by-election
- Lists of United Kingdom by-elections
