= 1961 Bristol South East by-election =

UK Parliamentary by-election

- 4 May 1961

Bristol South East constituency
- Turnout: 33,506; 56.7% (▼24.7 pp)
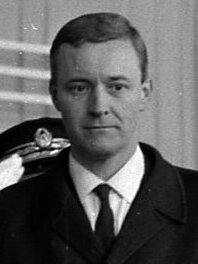
Candidate	Tony Benn, 2nd Viscount Stansgate (disqualified)	Malcolm St Clair
Party	Labour	Conservative
Popular vote	23,275	10,231
Percentage	69.5%	30.5%
Swing	▲13.3 pp	▼13.3 pp

The 1961 Bristol South East by-election was a by-election held on 4 May 1961 for the British House of Commons constituency of Bristol South East in the city of Bristol.

The seat had become vacant when the constituency's Labour Member of Parliament (MP), Tony Benn, had inherited a hereditary peerage from his father and became Viscount Stansgate, thus making him automatically ineligible to serve in the House of Commons. He had been elected at a by-election in 1950.

Benn stood in the by-election anyway—claiming that he had not asked for and would not ask for a writ of summons to the House of Lords—and won the majority of votes, but he was forbidden by Parliamentary authorities to physically return to the Commons due to his ineligibility. The Conservative Party candidate Malcolm St Clair—who was himself the heir to a peerage—filed a petition against the result, and was declared the winner after a court challenge.

When the law was later changed by the Peerage Act 1963 to allow Benn to renounce his peerage, Benn immediately did so and, fulfilling a promise to the electors of Bristol South East, St Clair resigned his seat. Benn was returned to the House of Commons at the 1963 Bristol South East by-election, which was not contested by the Conservatives.

== Result ==
1961 Bristol South East by-election
Party	Candidate	Votes	%	±%
Labour	Viscount Stansgate (Tony Benn) (disqualified)	23,275	69.5	+13.3
Conservative	Malcolm St Clair	10,231	30.5	−13.3
Majority		−13,044	−39.0	N/A
Turnout		33,506	56.7	−24.7
Conservative gain from Labour		Swing	−13.3	

== See also ==
- Tony Benn
- Bristol South East constituency
- 1950 Bristol South East by-election
- 1963 Bristol South East by-election
- Lists of United Kingdom by-elections
- Re Bristol South-East Parliamentary Election
