= Tony Benn =

British politician and activist (1925–2014)

The Right Honourable Tony Benn
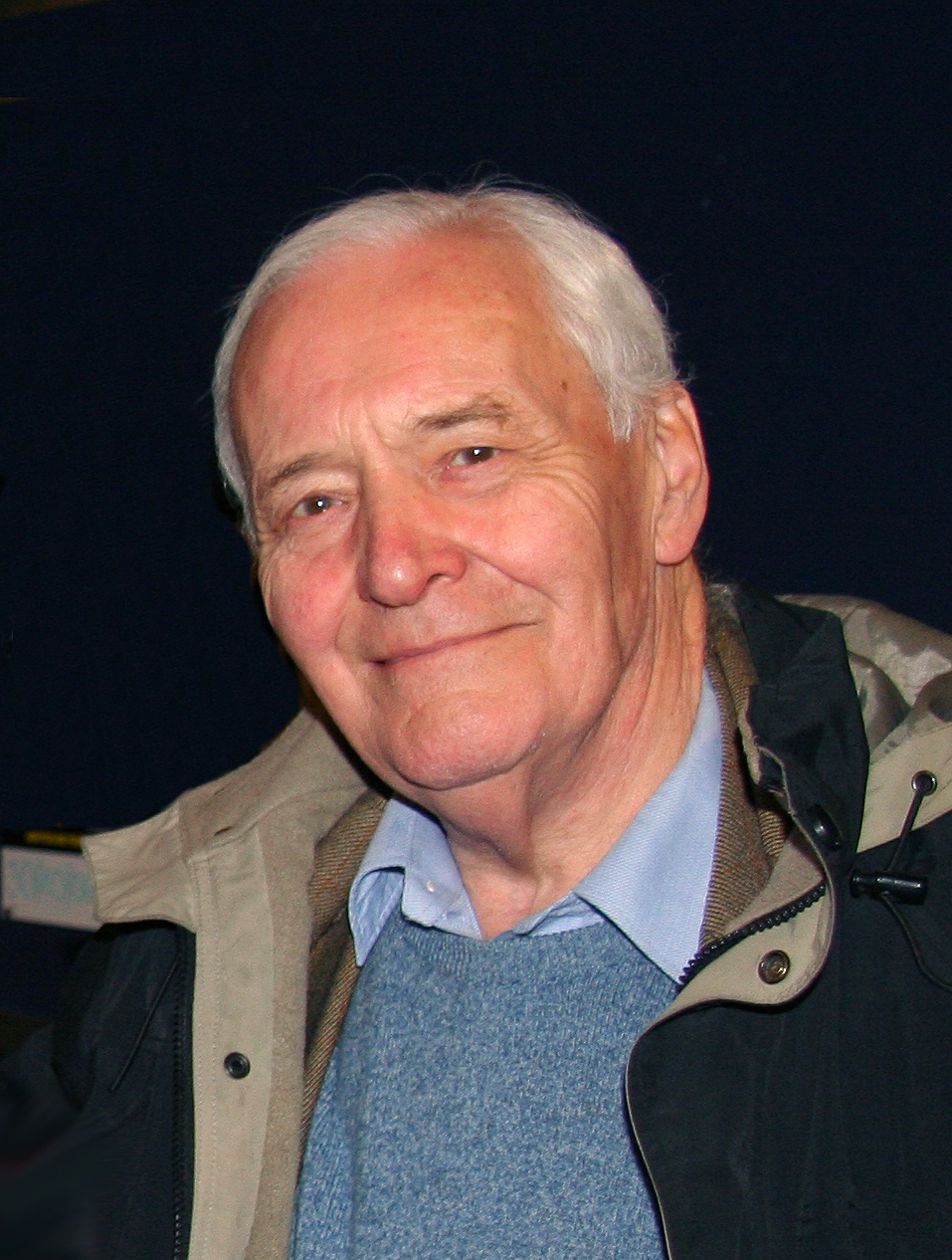
- Benn in 2006

Secretary of State for Energy
- In office 10 June 1975 – 4 May 1979
- Prime Minister: Harold Wilson; James Callaghan
- Preceded by: Eric Varley
- Succeeded by: David Howell

Secretary of State for Industry
- In office 5 March 1974 – 10 June 1975
- Prime Minister: Harold Wilson
- Preceded by: Peter Walker (Trade and Industry)
- Succeeded by: Eric Varley

Chairman of the National Executive Committee of the Labour Party
- In office 20 September 1971 – 25 September 1972
- Leader: Harold Wilson
- Preceded by: Ian Mikardo
- Succeeded by: William Simpson

Minister of Technology
- In office 4 July 1966 – 19 June 1970
- Prime Minister: Harold Wilson
- Preceded by: Frank Cousins
- Succeeded by: Geoffrey Rippon

Postmaster General
- In office 15 October 1964 – 4 July 1966
- Prime Minister: Harold Wilson
- Preceded by: Reginald Bevins
- Succeeded by: Edward Short
Parliamentary offices
Member of Parliament
In office 1 March 1984 – 14 May 2001
Preceded by	Eric Varley
Succeeded by	Paul Holmes
Constituency	Chesterfield
In office 20 August 1963 – 13 May 1983
Preceded by	Malcolm St Clair
Succeeded by	Constituency abolished
Constituency	Bristol South East
In office 30 November 1950 – 17 November 1960
Preceded by	Stafford Cripps
Succeeded by	Malcolm St Clair
Constituency	Bristol South East
Member of the House of Lords
Lord Temporal
Hereditary peerage 17 November 1960 – 31 July 1963
Preceded by	The 1st Viscount Stansgate
Succeeded by	The 3rd Viscount Stansgate (2021)

President of the Stop the War Coalition
- In office 21 September 2001 – 14 March 2014
- Vice President: Lindsey German
- Chairman: Andrew Murray; Jeremy Corbyn
- Preceded by: Position established
- Succeeded by: Brian Eno

Personal details
- Born: Anthony Neil Wedgwood Benn; 3 April 1925 London, England
- Died: 14 March 2014 (aged 88) London, England
- Party: Labour
- Other political affiliations: Socialist Campaign Group
- Spouse: Caroline DeCamp (m. 1949; died 2000)
- Children: 4, including Stephen, Hilary and Melissa
- Parents: William Wedgwood Benn (father); Margaret Holmes (mother)
- Relatives: Emily Benn (granddaughter)
- Education: New College, Oxford

Military service
- Allegiance: United Kingdom
- Branch/service: Royal Air Force
- Rank: Pilot officer
- Battles/wars: World War II
- Tony Benn's voice Benn on the causes of political apathy Recorded November 2012

Anthony Neil Wedgwood Benn (3 April 1925 – 14 March 2014), known between 1960 and 1963 as The Viscount Stansgate, was a British Labour Party politician and political activist who served as a Cabinet minister in the 1960s and 1970s. He was the member of Parliament (MP) for Bristol South East and then Chesterfield for 47 of the 51 years between 1950 and 2001. He later served as President of the Stop the War Coalition from 2001 to 2014.

Benn was born in Westminster, the son of Labour cabinet minister William Wedgwood Benn, 1st Viscount Stansgate, and privately educated at Westminster School. He was elected for Bristol South East at the 1950 general election, but on his father's death in 1960, he inherited his peerage, which prevented him from continuing to serve as an MP. He fought to remain in the House of Commons and campaigned for the ability to renounce the title, a campaign which eventually succeeded with the Peerage Act 1963. He was an active member of the Fabian Society and served as chairman from 1964 to 1965. He served in Harold Wilson's Labour government, first as Postmaster General, where he oversaw the opening of the Post Office Tower, and later as Minister of Technology.

Benn served as Chairman of the National Executive Committee from 1971 to 1972 while in Opposition. In the Labour government of 1974–1979, he returned to the Cabinet as Secretary of State for Industry and subsequently served as Secretary of State for Energy. He retained that post when James Callaghan succeeded Wilson as Prime Minister. When the Labour Party was in opposition through the 1980s, he emerged as a prominent figure on the left wing of the party and unsuccessfully challenged Neil Kinnock for the Labour leadership in 1988. After leaving Parliament at the 2001 general election, Benn was President of the Stop the War Coalition until his death in 2014.

Benn was widely seen as a key proponent of democratic socialism and Christian socialism, though in regards to the latter he supported the United Kingdom becoming a secular state and ending the Church of England's status as an official church of the United Kingdom. Originally considered a moderate within the party, he was identified as belonging to its left wing after leaving ministerial office. The terms Bennism and Bennite came into usage to describe the left-wing politics he espoused from the late 1970s and its adherents. He was an influence on the political views of Jeremy Corbyn, who was elected Leader of the Labour Party a year after Benn's death, and John McDonnell, who served as Shadow Chancellor of the Exchequer under Corbyn.

== Early life and family ==
Benn was born in Westminster, London, on 3 April 1925. He had two brothers, Michael (1921–1944), who was killed in the Second World War and David (1928–2017), a specialist in Russia and Eastern Europe. Following the Thames flood in January 1928 their house was uninhabitable so the Benn family moved to Scotland for over 12 months. Their father, William Benn, was a Liberal Member of Parliament from 1906 who crossed the floor to the Labour Party in 1928 and was appointed Secretary of State for India by Ramsay MacDonald in 1929, a position he held until the Labour Party's landslide electoral defeat in 1931.

William Benn was elevated to the House of Lords and given the title of Viscount Stansgate in 1942, as the new wartime coalition government was short of working Labour peers in the upper house. Tony Benn was subsequently titled with the honorific prefix, The Honourable. In 1945–1946, William Benn was the Secretary of State for Air in the first majority Labour Government.

Benn's mother, Margaret Benn (née Holmes, 1897–1991), was a theologian, feminist and the founder President of the Congregational Federation. She was a member of the League of the Church Militant, which was the predecessor of the Movement for the Ordination of Women; in 1925, she was rebuked by Randall Davidson, the Archbishop of Canterbury, for advocating the ordination of women. His mother's theology had a profound influence on Benn, as she taught him that the stories in the Bible were mostly about the struggle between the prophets and the kings and that he ought in his life to support the prophets over the kings, who had power, as the prophets taught righteousness.

Benn was for over 30 years a committed Christian. He said that the teachings of Jesus Christ had a "radical political importance" on his life, and made a distinction between the historical Jesus as "a carpenter of Nazareth" who advocated social justice and egalitarianism and "the way in which he's presented by some religious authorities; by popes, archbishops and bishops who present Jesus as justification for their power", believing this to be a gross misunderstanding of the role of Jesus. He believed that it was a "great mistake" to assume that the teachings of Christianity are outdated in modern Britain and Higgins wrote in The Benn Inheritance that Benn was "a socialist whose political commitment owes much more to the teaching of Jesus than the writing of Marx". (Indeed, he did not read The Communist Manifesto until he was in his 50s.) "The driving force of his life was Christian socialism," according to Peter Wilby, linking Benn to the "high-minded" founding roots of Labour.

Later in his life, Benn emphasised morality and righteousness, as well as ethical principles of Nonconformism. On Desert Island Discs he said that he had been powerfully influenced by "what I would call the Dissenting tradition" (that is, the English Dissenters who left or were ejected from the established church, one of whom was his ancestor William Benn). "I've never thought we can understand the world we lived in unless we understood the history of the church", Benn said to the Catholic Herald. "All political freedoms were won, first of all, through religious freedom. Some of the arguments about the control of the media today, which are very big arguments, are the arguments that would have been fought in the religious wars. You have the satellites coming in now—well, it is the multinational church all over again. That's why Mrs Thatcher pulled Britain out of UNESCO: she was not prepared, any more than Ronald Reagan was, to be part of an organisation that talked about a New World Information Order, people speaking to each other without the help of Murdoch or Maxwell."

According to Wilby in the New Statesman, Benn "decided to do without the paraphernalia and doctrine of organised religion but not without the teachings of Jesus". Although Benn became more agnostic as he became older, he was intrigued by the connexions between Christianity, radicalism and socialism. Wilby also wrote in The Guardian that although former Chancellor Stafford Cripps described Benn as "as keen a Christian as I am myself", Benn wrote in 2005 that he was "a Christian agnostic" who believed "in Jesus the prophet, not Christ the king", specifically rejecting the label of "humanist".

Both of Benn's grandfathers were Liberal Party MPs; his paternal grandfather was John Benn, a politician, MP for Tower Hamlets and later Devonport, who was created a baronet in 1914 (and who founded a publishing company, Benn Brothers) and his maternal grandfather was Daniel Holmes, MP for Glasgow Govan. Benn's contact with leading politicians of the day dates back to his earliest years. He met the Prime Minister, Ramsay MacDonald, when he was five years old and described him as "A kindly old gentleman [who] leaned over me and offered me a chocolate biscuit. I've looked at Labour leaders in a funny way ever since". Benn also met former Liberal Prime Minister David Lloyd George when he was 12 and later recalled that, while still a boy, he once shook hands with Mahatma Gandhi, in 1931, while his father was Secretary of State for India.

During the Second World War, Benn joined and trained with the Home Guard from the age of 16, later recalling in a speech made in 2009, "I could use a bayonet, a rifle, a revolver, and if I'd seen a German officer having a meal I'd have tossed a grenade through the window. Would I have been a freedom fighter or a terrorist?" In July 1943, Benn enlisted in the Royal Air Force as an aircraftsman 2nd Class. His father and elder brother Michael (who was later killed in an accident) were already serving in the RAF. He was granted an emergency commission as a pilot officer (on probation) on 10 March 1945. As a pilot officer, Benn served as a pilot in South Africa and Southern Rhodesia. In June 1944, he made his first solo flight, at RAF Guinea Fowl, an RAF Elementary Flying Training School, in Southern Rhodesia. The aircraft was a Canadian-built Fairchild Cornell. In a 1993 article recounting the experience, he said, "I always thought that I would feel a sense of panic when I saw the ground coming up at me on my first solo, but strangely enough I didn't feel anything but exhilaration ...". He relinquished his commission with effect from 10 August 1945, three months after the war ended in Europe on 8 May and just days before the war with Japan ended on 2 September.

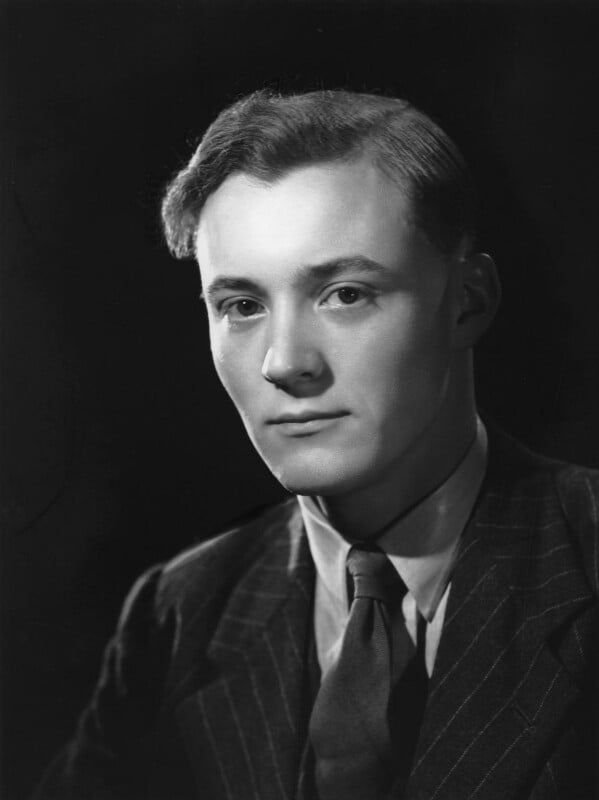
Benn in 1947

After attending Eaton House day school near Sloane Square, Benn entered Westminster School, and studied at New College, Oxford, where he read Philosophy, politics and economics and was elected President of the Oxford Union in 1947. In later life, Benn removed public references to his private education from Who's Who. In 1970 all references to Westminster School were removed, and in the 1975 edition his entry stated: "Education—still in progress". In the 1976 edition, almost all details were omitted except his name, jobs as a member of parliament and as a Government Minister, and address; the publishers confirmed that Benn had sent back the draft entry with everything else struck through. In the 1977 edition, Benn's entry disappeared entirely, and when he returned to Who's Who in 1983, he was listed as "Tony Benn" and all references to his education or service record were removed.

In 1972, Benn said in his diaries that "Today I had the idea that I would resign my Privy Councillorship, my MA and all my honorary doctorates in order to strip myself of what the world had to offer". While he acknowledged that he "might be ridiculed" for doing so, Benn said that "'Wedgie Benn' and 'the Rt Honourable Anthony Wedgwood Benn' and all that stuff is impossible. I have been Tony Benn in Bristol for a long time." In October 1973, he announced on BBC Radio that he wished to be known as Mr. Tony Benn rather than Anthony Wedgwood Benn, and his book Speeches from 1974 is credited to "Tony Benn". Despite this name change, social historian Alwyn W. Turner writes: "Just as those with an agenda to pursue still call Muhammed Ali by his original name ... so most newspapers continued to refer to Tony Benn as Wedgwood Benn, or Wedgie in the case of the tabloids, for years to come."

Benn met Caroline Middleton DeCamp (born 13 October 1926, Cincinnati, Ohio, United States) over tea at Worcester College, Oxford, in 1949; just nine days after meeting her, he proposed to her on a park bench in the city. Later, he bought the bench from Oxford City Council and installed it in the garden of their home in Holland Park. Tony and Caroline had four children—Stephen, Hilary, Melissa, a feminist writer, and Joshua—and 10 grandchildren. Caroline Benn died of cancer on 22 November 2000, aged 74, after a career as an educationalist.

Two of Benn's children have been active in Labour Party politics. His eldest son Stephen was an elected Member of the Inner London Education Authority from 1986 to 1990. His second son Hilary was a councillor in London, stood for Parliament in 1983 and 1987, and became Labour MP for Leeds Central in 1999. He was Secretary of State for International Development from 2003 to 2007, and then Secretary of State for Environment, Food and Rural Affairs until 2010, later serving as Shadow Foreign Secretary (2015–16). This makes him the third generation of his family to have been a member of the Cabinet, a rare distinction for a modern political family in Britain. Benn's granddaughter Emily Benn was the Labour Party's youngest-ever candidate when she failed to win East Worthing and Shoreham in 2010. Benn was a first cousin once removed of the actress Margaret Rutherford.

Benn and his wife Caroline became vegetarian in 1970, for ethical reasons, and remained so for the rest of their lives. Benn cited the decision of his son Hilary to become vegetarian as an important factor in his own decision to adopt a vegetarian diet.

== Early parliamentary career ==
=== Member of Parliament, 1950–1964 ===
Following the Second World War, Benn worked briefly as a BBC Radio producer. On 1 November 1950, he was selected to succeed Stafford Cripps as the Labour candidate for Bristol South East, after Cripps stood down because of ill-health. He won the seat in a by-election on 30 November 1950. Anthony Crosland helped him get the seat as he was the MP for nearby South Gloucestershire at the time. Upon taking the oath on 4 December 1950 Benn became "Baby of the House", the youngest MP, for one day, being succeeded by Thomas Teevan, who was two years younger but took his oath a day later. He became the "Baby" again in 1951, when Teevan was not re-elected. In the 1950s, Benn held middle-of-the-road or soft left views, and was not associated with the young left wing group around Aneurin Bevan.

Benn masterminded Labour's television campaign for the 1959 general election. He oversaw a series of twelve broadcasts, each nearly 20 minutes long, which blended style, images and music with political content. Although the broadcasts were widely praised for being innovative, and for modernising Labour's image, Labour lost the election.

Also in 1959, he was elected to Labour's National Executive Committee, and in November that year was made Shadow Transport Minister by Hugh Gaitskell. In this role he argued for annual roadworthiness tests for vehicles, compulsory seat belts, and harsher penalties for drunken drivers, all of which eventually became law.

As MP for Bristol South East, Benn helped organise the 1963 Bristol Bus Boycott against the colour bar of the Bristol Omnibus Company against employing black and Asian drivers. Benn said that he would "stay off the buses, even if I have to find a bike", and Labour leader Harold Wilson also told an anti-apartheid rally in London he was "glad that so many Bristolians are supporting the [boycott] campaign", adding that he "wish[ed] them every success".

=== Peerage reform ===
Benn's father was created Viscount Stansgate in 1942 when Winston Churchill increased the number of Labour peers to aid political work in the House of Lords; at this time, Benn's elder brother Michael, then serving in the RAF, was intending to enter the priesthood and had no objections to inheriting a peerage. However, Michael was later killed in an accident while on active service in the Second World War, and this left Benn as the heir-apparent to the peerage. He made several unsuccessful attempts to renounce the succession.

In November 1960, Lord Stansgate died. Benn automatically became a peer, preventing him from sitting in the House of Commons. The Speaker of the Commons, Sir Harry Hylton-Foster, did not allow him to deliver a speech from the bar of the House of Commons in April 1961 when the by-election was being called. Continuing to maintain his right to abandon his peerage, Benn fought to retain his seat in a by-election caused by his succession on 4 May 1961. Although he was disqualified from taking his seat, he was re-elected. An election court found that the voters were fully aware that Benn was disqualified, and declared the seat won by the Conservative runner-up, Malcolm St Clair, who was at the time also the heir presumptive to a peerage.

Benn continued his campaign outside Parliament. Within two years, though, the Conservative Government of the time, which had members in the same or similar situation to Benn's (i.e., who were going to receive title, or who had already applied for writs of summons), changed the law. The Peerage Act 1963, allowing lifetime disclaimer of peerages, became law shortly after 6 pm on 31 July 1963. Benn was the first peer to renounce his title, doing so at 6.22 pm that day. St Clair, fulfilling a promise he had made at the time of his election, then accepted the office of Steward of the Manor of Northstead, disqualifying himself from the House (outright resignation not being possible). Benn returned to the Commons after winning a by-election on 20 August 1963.

Benn was a supporter of abolishing the House of Lords.

== In government, 1964–1970 ==
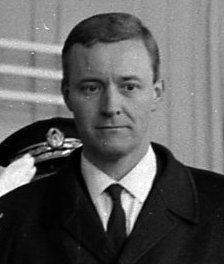
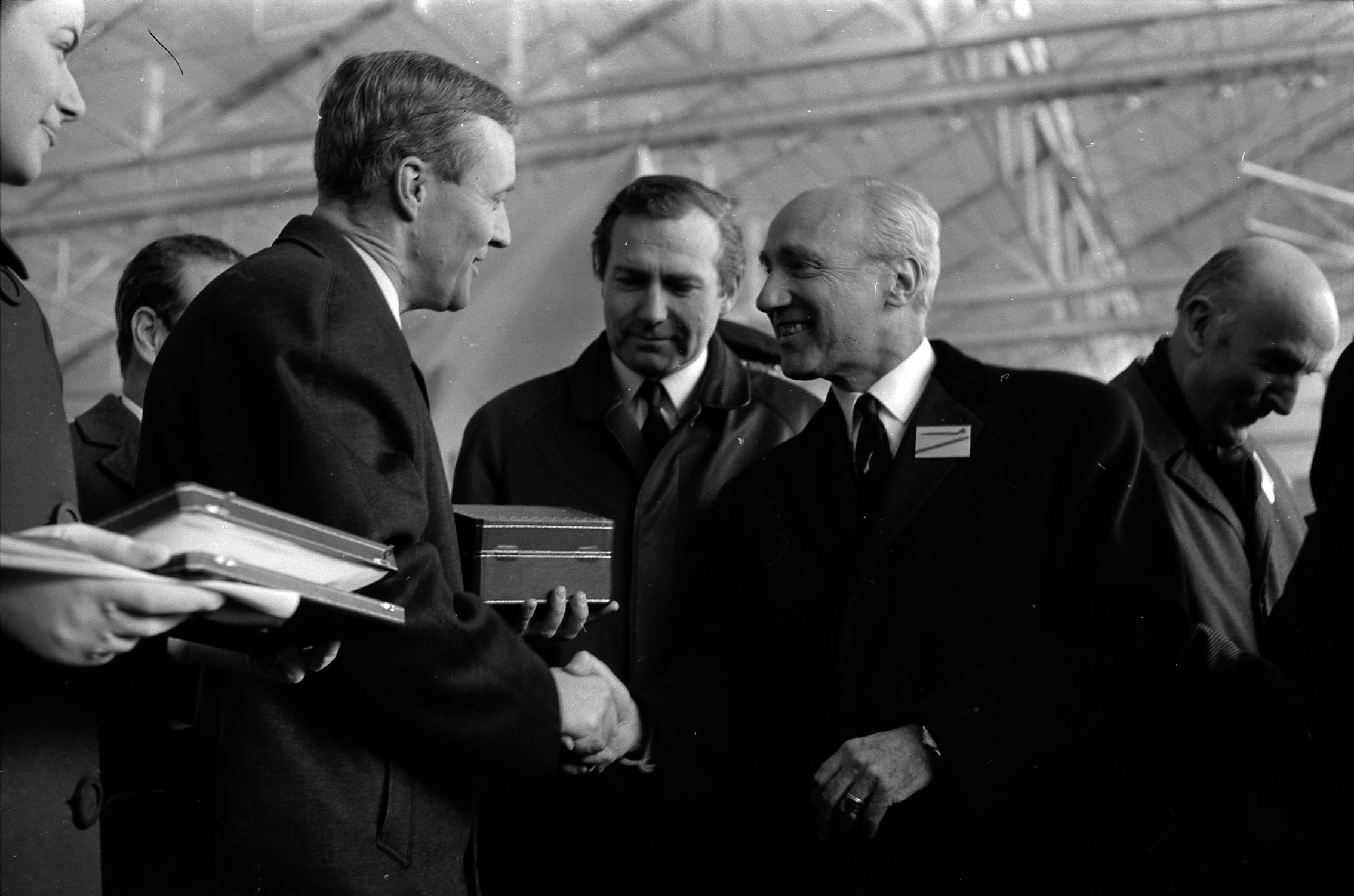
Tony Benn during the official presentation of Concorde, 11 December 1967

In the 1964 Government led by Harold Wilson, Benn was Postmaster General, where he oversaw the opening of the Post Office Tower, then the UK's tallest building, and the creations of the Post Bus service and Girobank. He proposed issuing stamps without the monarch's head, but this met with private opposition from Elizabeth II. Instead, the portrait was reduced to a small profile in silhouette, a format that is still used on commemorative stamps.

Benn also led the government's opposition to the "pirate" radio stations broadcasting from international waters, which he was aware would be an unpopular measure. He claimed that some of these stations were causing interference to emergency radio used by shipping, although he was not responsible for introducing the Marine Broadcasting Offences Bill when it came before Parliament at the end of July 1966 for its first reading.

Earlier in the month, Benn was promoted to Minister of Technology, which included responsibility for the development of Concorde and the formation of International Computers Ltd (ICL). The period also saw government involvement in industrial rationalisation, and the merger of several car companies to form British Leyland. Following Conservative MP Enoch Powell's 1968 "Rivers of Blood" speech to a Conservative Association meeting, in opposition to Harold Wilson's insistence on not "stirring up the Powell issue", Benn said during the 1970 general election campaign:

The flag of racialism which has been hoisted in Wolverhampton is beginning to look like the one that fluttered 25 years ago over Dachau and Belsen. If we do not speak up now against the filthy and obscene racialist propaganda ... the forces of hatred will mark up their first success and mobilise their first offensive ... Enoch Powell has emerged as the real leader of the Conservative Party. He is a far stronger character than Mr. Heath. He speaks his mind; Heath does not. The final proof of Powell's power is that Heath dare not attack him publicly, even when he says things that disgust decent Conservatives.

The mainstream press attacked Benn for using language deemed as intemperate as Powell's language in his "Rivers of Blood" speech (which was widely regarded as racist), and Benn noted in his diary that "letters began pouring in on the Powell speech: 2:1 against me but some very sympathetic ones saying that my speech was overdue". Harold Wilson later reprimanded Benn for this speech, accusing him of losing Labour seats in the 1970 general election.

During the 1970s Benn publicly defended Marxism, saying:

The Communist Manifesto, and many other works of Marxist philosophy, have always profoundly influenced the British labour movement and the British Labour Party, and have strengthened our understanding and enriched our thinking. It would be as unthinkable to try to construct the Labour Party without Marx as it would be to establish university faculties of astronomy, anthropology or psychology without permitting the study of Copernicus, Darwin or Freud, and still expect such faculties to be taken seriously.

Labour lost the 1970 election to Edward Heath's Conservatives and upon Heath's application to join the European Economic Community, a surge in left-wing Euroscepticism emerged. Benn "was stridently against membership", and campaigned in favour of a referendum on the UK's membership. The Shadow Cabinet voted to support a referendum on 29 March 1972, and as a result Roy Jenkins resigned as deputy leader of the Labour Party.

== In government, 1974–1979 ==
In the Labour government of 1974, Benn was Secretary of State for Industry and as such increased nationalised industry pay, provided better terms and conditions for workers such as the Health and Safety at Work etc. Act 1974, and was involved in setting up worker cooperatives in firms which were struggling, the best known being at Meriden, outside Coventry, producing Triumph Motorcycles. In 1975, he was appointed Secretary of State for Energy, immediately following his unsuccessful campaign for a "No" vote in the referendum on the UK's continued membership of the European Community (Common Market). Later in his diary, (25 October 1977) Benn wrote that he "loathed" the EEC; he claimed it was "bureaucratic and centralised" and "of course it is really dominated by Germany. All the Common Market countries except the UK have been occupied by Germany, and they have this mixed feeling of hatred and subservience towards the Germans".

Harold Wilson resigned as leader of the Labour Party and Prime Minister in March 1976. Benn later attributed the collapse of the Wilson government to cuts enforced on the UK by global capital, in particular the International Monetary Fund. In the resulting leadership contest Benn finished in fourth place out of the six cabinet ministers who stood—he withdrew as 11.8 per cent of colleagues voted for him in the first ballot. Benn withdrew from the second ballot and endorsed Michael Foot; James Callaghan eventually won. Despite not receiving his support in the second and third rounds of the vote, Callaghan kept Benn on as Energy Secretary. In 1976, there was a sterling crisis, and Chancellor of the Exchequer Denis Healey sought a loan from the International Monetary Fund. Underlining a wish to counter international market forces which seemed to penalise a larger welfare state, Benn publicly circulated the divided Cabinet minutes in which a narrow majority of the Labour Cabinet under Ramsay MacDonald supported a cut in unemployment benefits to obtain a loan from American bankers. As he highlighted, these minutes resulted in the 1931 split of the Labour Party in which MacDonald and his allies formed a National Government with Conservatives and Liberals. Callaghan allowed Benn to put forward the Alternative Economic Strategy, which consisted of a self-sufficient economy less dependent on low-rate fresh borrowing, but the AES, which according to opponents would have led to a "siege economy", was rejected by the Cabinet. In response, Benn later recalled that: "I retorted that their policy was a siege economy, only they had the bankers inside the castle with all our supporters left outside, whereas my policy would have our supporters in the castle with the bankers outside." Benn blamed the Winter of Discontent on these cuts to socialist policies.

Upon the death of Mao Zedong in 1976, Benn described Mao as "one of the greatest—if not the greatest—figures of the twentieth century: a schoolteacher who transformed China, released it from civil war and foreign attack and constructed a new society there" in his diaries, adding that "he certainly towers above any twentieth-century figure I can think of in his philosophical contribution and military genius". On his trip to the Chinese embassy after Mao's death, Benn recorded in an earlier volume of his diaries that he was "a great admirer of Mao", while also admitting that "he made mistakes, because everybody does".

During Benn's time as energy minister from 1975 to 1979 he supported nuclear power in the United Kingdom. Later in his life he became an opponent of nuclear power, attributing his time running it as a minister to persuading him it was not cheap, safe or peaceful. When asked in an interview in January 2009 on what he had changed his mind on over the course of his life he expanded on this issue by saying:

Nuclear power, for example. In 1955 when Eisenhower said he was going for 'Atoms for Peace' I became a passionate supporter of it. Having been brought up on the Bible I liked the idea of swords into ploughshares. I advocated nuclear power as Minister of Technology. I was told, and believed, that nuclear power was cheap, safe and peaceful. Having been in charge of nuclear power I discovered it wasn't cheap, wasn't safe and when I left office I was told that during my period as Secretary of State for Energy, plutonium from our nuclear power stations went to the Pentagon to make nuclear weapons. So every nuclear power station in Britain is a bomb factory for America. I was utterly shaken by that. Nothing in the world would now induce me to support nuclear power. It was a mistake.

=== Move to the left ===
By the end of the 1970s, Benn's views had shifted to the left wing of the Labour Party. He attributed this political shift to his experience as a Cabinet Minister in the 1964–1970 Labour Government. Benn ascribed his move to the left to four lessons:

1. How "the Civil Service can frustrate the policies and decisions of popularly elected governments"
2. The centralised nature of the Labour Party which allowed the Leader to run "the Party almost as if it were his personal kingdom"
3. "The power of industrialists and bankers to get their way by use of the crudest form of economic pressure, even blackmail, against a Labour Government"
4. The power of the media, which "like the power of the medieval Church, ensures that events of the day are always presented from the point of view of those who enjoy economic privilege"

As regards the power of industrialists and bankers, Benn remarked:

Compared to this, the pressure brought to bear in industrial disputes by the unions is minuscule. This power was revealed even more clearly in 1976 when the International Monetary Fund secured cuts in our public expenditure. ... These [four] lessons led me to the conclusion that the UK is only superficially governed by MPs and the voters who elect them. Parliamentary democracy is, in truth, little more than a means of securing a periodical change in the management team, which is then allowed to preside over a system that remains in essence intact. If the British people were ever to ask themselves what power they truly enjoyed under our political system they would be amazed to discover how little it is, and some new Chartist agitation might be born and might quickly gather momentum.

Benn's philosophy consisted of a form of syndicalism, state planning where necessary to ensure national competitiveness, greater democracy in the structures of the Labour Party and observance of party conference decisions. Alongside an alleged 12 Labour MPs, he spent 12 years affiliated with the Institute for Workers' Control, beginning in 1971 when he visited the Upper Clyde shipyards, arguing in 1975 for the "labour movement to intensify its discussion about industrial democracy".

He was vilified by most of the press while his opponents implied and stated that a Benn-led Labour Government would implement a type of Eastern European state socialism, with Edward Heath referring to Benn as "Commissar Benn" and others referring to Benn as a "Bollinger Bolshevik". Despite this, Benn was overwhelmingly popular with Labour activists in the constituencies: a survey of delegates at the Labour Party Conference in 1978 found that by large margins they supported Benn for the leadership, as well as many Bennite policies.

He publicly supported Sinn Féin and the unification of Ireland, although in 2005 he suggested to Sinn Féin leaders that it abandon its long-standing policy of not taking seats at Westminster (abstentionism). Sinn Féin in turn argued that to do so would recognise Britain's claim over Northern Ireland, and the Sinn Féin constitution prevented its elected members from taking their seats in any British-created institution. A supporter of the Scottish Parliament and political devolution, Benn however opposed the Scottish National Party and Scottish independence, saying: "I think nationalism is a mistake. And I am half Scots and feel it would divide me in half with a knife. The thought that my mother would suddenly be a foreigner would upset me very much."

In British politics during this period, the term "Bennism" came into use to describe the conviction politics, economic, social and political ideology of Tony Benn; and an exponent or advocate of Bennism was regarded as a "Bennite".

== In opposition, 1979–1997 ==
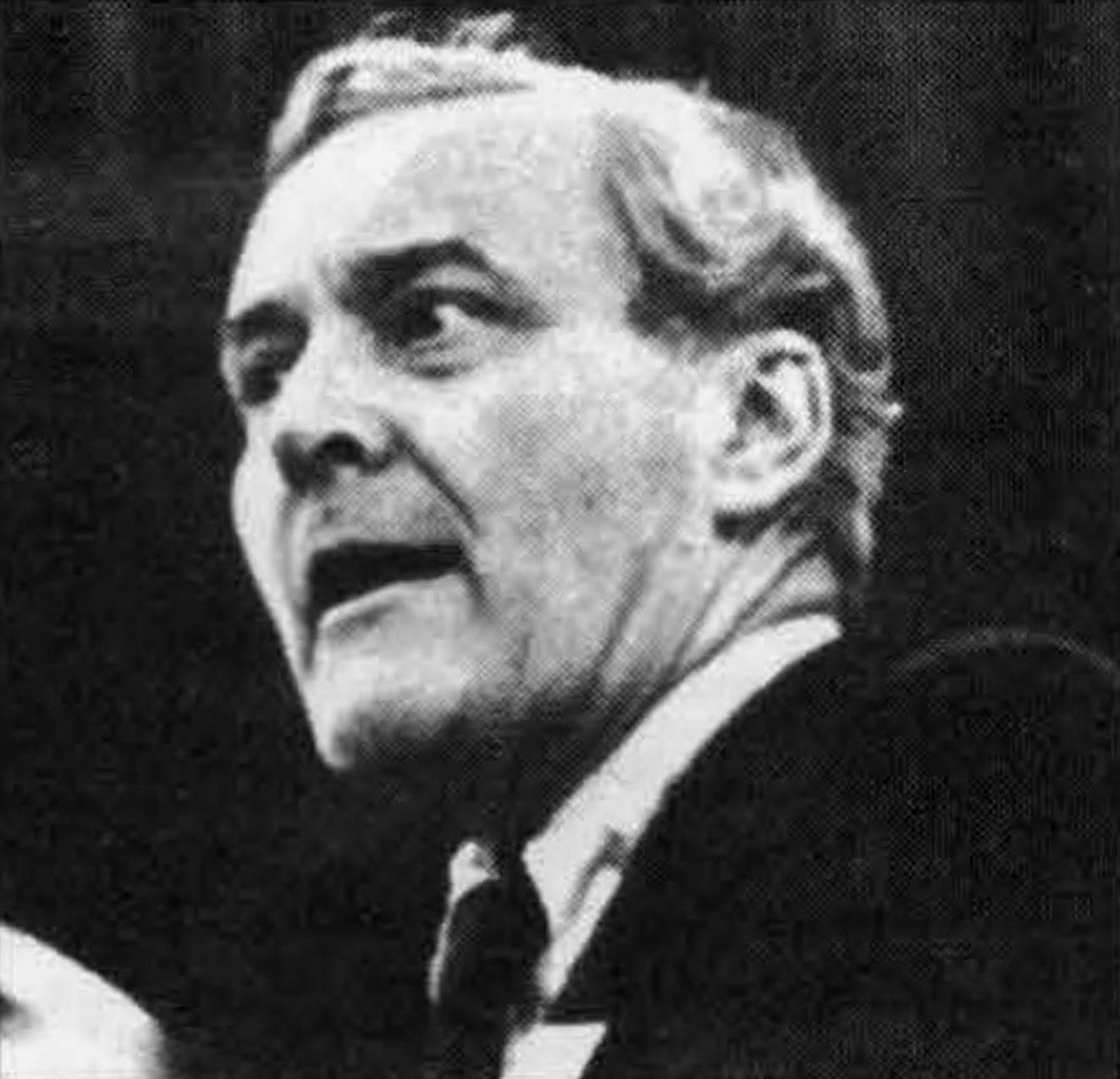
Benn speaks at the 5th National Convention of the Democratic Socialist Organizing Committee in Philadelphia, May 1981

In a keynote speech to the Labour Party Conference of 1980, shortly before the resignation of party leader James Callaghan and election of Michael Foot as successor, Benn outlined what he envisaged the next Labour Government would do. "Within days", a Labour Government would gain powers to nationalise industries, control capital and implement industrial democracy; "within weeks", all powers from Brussels would be returned to Westminster, and the House of Lords would be abolished by creating one thousand new peers and then abolishing the peerage. Benn received tumultuous applause. On 25 January 1981, Roy Jenkins, David Owen, Shirley Williams and Bill Rodgers (known collectively as the "Gang of Four") launched the Council for Social Democracy, which became the Social Democratic Party in March. The "Gang of Four" left the Labour Party because of what they perceived to be the influence of the Militant tendency and the Bennite "hard left" within the party. Benn was highly critical of the SDP, saying that "Britain has had SDP governments for the past 25 years."

Benn stood against Denis Healey, the party's incumbent deputy leader, triggering the 1981 deputy leadership election, disregarding an appeal from fellow left-winger Michael Foot to either stand for the leadership or abstain from inflaming the party's divisions. Benn defended his decision insisting that it was "not about personalities, but about policies". The result was announced on 27 September 1981; Healey retained his position by a margin of barely one per cent. The decision of several soft left MPs, including Neil Kinnock, to abstain triggered the split of the Socialist Campaign Group from the left of the Tribune Group. After Argentina invaded the Falkland Islands in April 1982, Benn argued that the dispute should be settled by the United Nations and that the British Government should not send a task force to recapture the islands. The task force was sent, and following the Falklands War, they were back in British control by mid-June. In a debate in the Commons just after the Falklands were recaptured, Benn's demand for "a full analysis of the costs in life, equipment and money in this tragic and unnecessary war" was rejected by Margaret Thatcher, who stated that "he would not enjoy the freedom of speech that he put to such excellent use unless people had been prepared to fight for it".

For the 1983 election Benn's Bristol South East constituency was abolished by boundary changes, and he lost to Michael Cocks in the selection of a candidate to stand in the new winnable seat of Bristol South. Rejecting offers from the new seat of Livingston in Scotland, Benn contested Bristol East, losing to the Conservative's Jonathan Sayeed in June 1983. Foot resigned as leader following the defeat which reduced Labour to only 209 MPs, while Healey also decided to step down as deputy leader. However Benn's absence from parliament meant that he was unable to stand in the resulting leadership contest as only MPs were eligible to be candidates. Benn's absence from the contest was reported by The Glasgow Herald to leave Neil Kinnock as "the favourite Left-wing candidate". Ultimately Kinnock won the contest, formally replacing Foot as party leader in October of that year.

In a by-election, Benn was elected as the MP for Chesterfield, the next Labour seat to fall vacant, after Eric Varley had left the Commons to head Coalite. On the day of the by-election, 1 March 1984, The Sun newspaper ran a hostile feature article, "Benn on the Couch", which purported to be the opinions of an American psychiatrist.

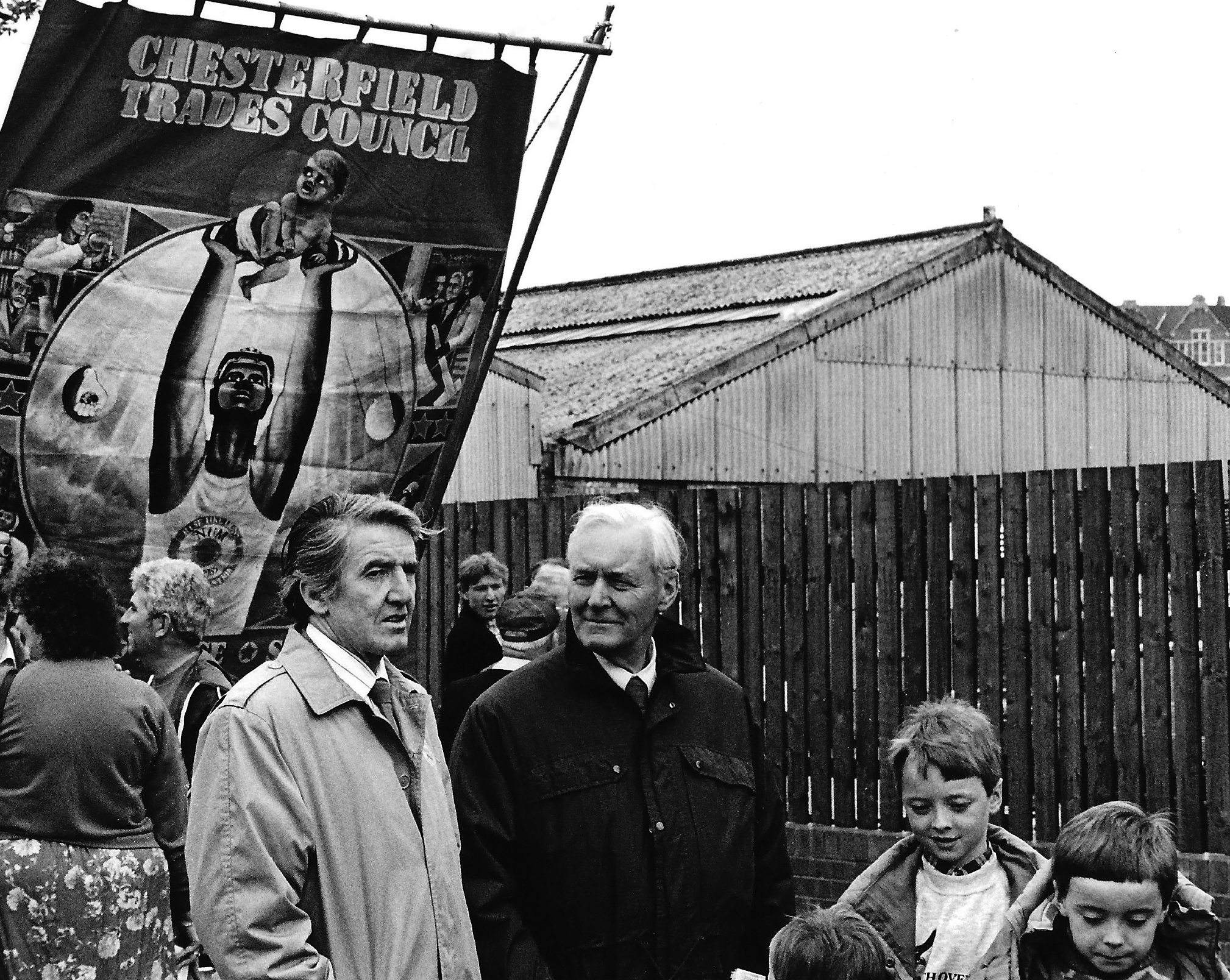
With Dennis Skinner at a May Day parade in Chesterfield, May 1992

Newly elected to a mining seat, Benn was a supporter of the 1984–85 UK miners' strike, which was beginning when he returned to the Commons, and of his long-standing friend, the National Union of Mineworkers leader Arthur Scargill. However, some miners considered Benn's 1977 industry reforms to have caused problems during the strike; firstly, that they led to huge wage differences and distrust between miners of different regions; and secondly that the controversy over balloting miners for these reforms made it unclear as to whether a ballot was needed for a strike or whether it could be deemed as a "regional matter" in the same way that the 1977 reforms had been. Benn also spoke at a Militant tendency rally held in 1984, saying: "The labour movement is not engaged in a personalised battle against individual cabinet ministers, nor do we seek to win public support by arguing that the crisis could be ended by the election of a new and more humane team of ministers who are better qualified to administer capitalism. We are working for a majority labour government, elected on a socialist programme, as decided by conference."

In June 1985, three months after the miners admitted defeat and ended their strike, Benn introduced the Miners' Amnesty (General Pardon) Bill into the Commons, which would have extended an amnesty to all miners imprisoned during the strike. This would have included two men convicted of murder (later reduced to manslaughter) for the killing of David Wilkie, a taxi driver driving a non-striking miner to work in South Wales during the strike.

Benn stood for election as party leader in 1988, against Neil Kinnock, following Labour's third successive defeat in the 1987 general election, losing by a substantial margin, and received only about 11 per cent of the vote. In May 1989 he made an extended appearance on Channel 4's late-night discussion programme After Dark, alongside among others Lord Dacre and Miles Copeland. During the Gulf War, Benn visited Baghdad to try to persuade Saddam Hussein to release the hostages who had been captured.

Benn supported various LGBT social movements, which were then known as gay liberation; Benn had voted in favour of decriminalisation in 1967. Talking about Section 28 of the Local Government Act 1988, a piece of anti-gay legislation preventing the "promotion of homosexuality", Benn said:

if the sense of the word "promote" can be read across from "describe", every murder play promotes murder, every war play promotes war, every drama involving the eternal triangle promotes adultery; and Mr. Richard Branson's condom campaign promotes fornication. The House had better be very careful before it gives to judges, who come from a narrow section of society, the power to interpret "promote".

Benn later voted for the repeal of Section 28 during the first term of Tony Blair's New Labour Government, and voted in favour of equalising the age of consent.

In 1990, he proposed a "Margaret Thatcher (Global Repeal) Bill", which he said "could go through both Houses in 24 hours. It would be easy to reverse the policies and replace the personalities—the process has begun—but the rotten values that have been propagated from the platform of political power in Britain during the past 10 years will be an infection—a virulent strain of right-wing capitalist thinking which it will take time to overcome."

In 1991, with Labour still in opposition and a general election due by June 1992, he proposed the Commonwealth of Britain Bill, abolishing the monarchy in favour of the United Kingdom becoming a "democratic, federal and secular commonwealth", a republic with a written constitution. It was read in Parliament a number of times until his retirement at the 2001 election, but never achieved a second reading. He presented an account of his proposal in Common Sense: A New Constitution for Britain.

The bill included the following:

- Abolishing the House of Lords
- Establishing a House of the People
- Lowering the voting age to 16
- Establishing a national parliament for England, Scotland and Wales
- Ending British rule in Northern Ireland
- The Church separated from the state
- Honours list reformed to recognise services to the community
- Confirmation of judges and election of magistrates
- No constitutional role for the monarchy (continue to live in Buckingham Palace)

In the same year, Benn also received a Pipe Smoker of the Year award, claiming in his acceptance speech that "pipe smoking stopped you going to war".

Benn remained a vocal critic in Parliament of British membership of the European Economic Community (later European Union), citing its "democratic deficit" as a main point of contempt. In 1991, Benn reiterated his opposition to the European Communities' European Commission and highlighted an alleged democratic deficit in the institution, saying: "Some people genuinely believe that we shall never get social justice from the British Government, but we shall get it from Jacques Delors. They believe that a good king is better than a bad Parliament. I have never taken that view." This argument has also been used by many on the right-wing Eurosceptic wing of the Conservative Party, such as Daniel Hannan MEP. Jonathan Freedland writes in The Guardian: "For [Tony Benn], even benign rule by a monarch was worthless because the king's whim could change and there'd be nothing you could do about it."

== Prior to retirement, 1997–2001 ==
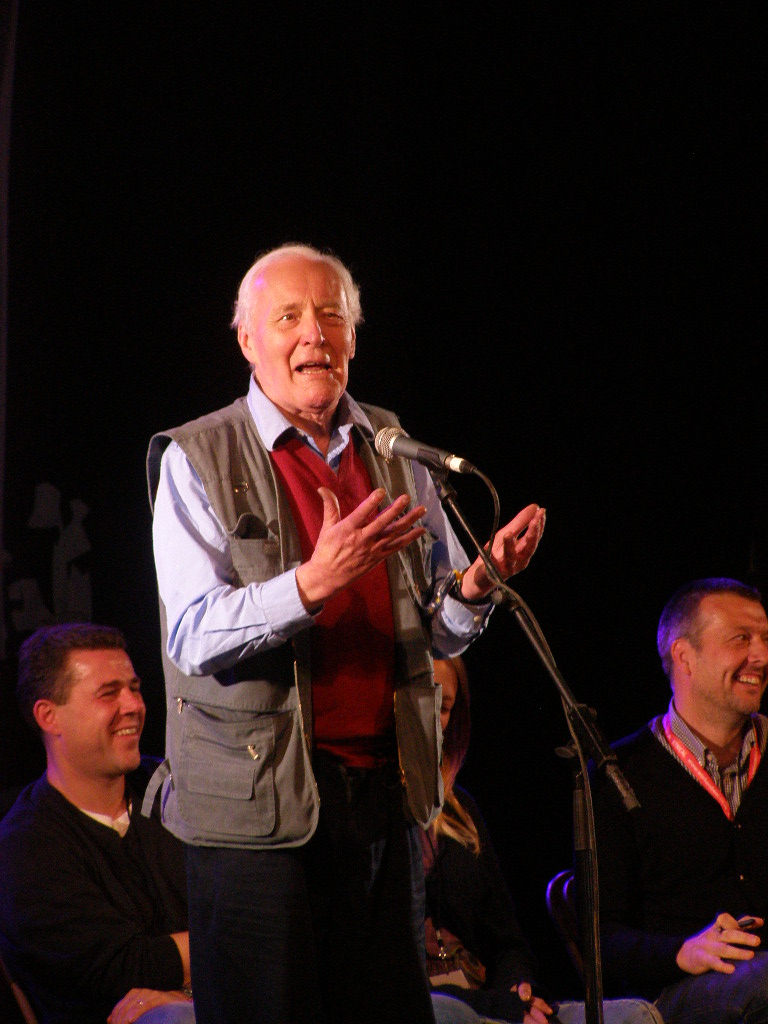
Benn speaking at the Glastonbury Festival in 2008

In 1997, the Labour Party under the leadership of Tony Blair won the general election in a landslide, after 18 years of Conservative Party rule. Despite later calling Labour under Blair "the idea of a Conservative group who had taken over Labour" and saying that "[Blair] set up a new political party, New Labour", his political diaries Free at Last show that Benn was initially somewhat sympathetic to Blair, welcoming a change of government. Benn supported the introduction of the national minimum wage, and welcomed the progress towards peace and security in Northern Ireland (particularly under Mo Mowlam). He was supportive of the extra money given to public services in the New Labour years but believed it to be under the guise of privatisation. Overall, his concluding judgement on New Labour is highly critical; he describes its evolution as a way of retaining office by abandoning socialism and distancing the party from the trade union movement, adopting a presidentialist style of politics, overriding the concept of the collective ministerial responsibility by reducing the power of the Cabinet, eliminated any effective influence from the annual conference of the Labour Party and "hinged its foreign policy on support for one of the worst presidents in US history".

Benn strongly objected to the bombing of Iraq in December 1998, calling it immoral and saying: "Aren't Arabs terrified? Aren't Iraqis terrified? Don't Arab and Iraqi women weep when their children die? Doesn't bombing strengthen their determination? ... Every Member of Parliament tonight who votes for the government motion will be consciously and deliberately accepting the responsibility for the deaths of innocent people if the war begins, as I fear it will." Benn also opposed the 1999 NATO bombing of Yugoslavia.

Several months prior to his retirement, Benn was a signatory to a letter, alongside Niki Adams (Legal Action for Women), Ian Macdonald, Gareth Peirce, and other legal professionals, that was published in The Guardian newspaper on 22 February 2001 condemning raids of more than 50 brothels in the central London area of Soho. At the time, a police spokesman said: "As far as we know, this is the biggest simultaneous crackdown on brothels and prostitution in this country in recent times", the arrest of 28 people in an operation that involved around 110 police officers. The letter read:

In the name of "protecting" women from trafficking, about 40 women, including a woman from Iraq, were arrested, detained and in some cases summarily removed from Britain. If any of these women have been trafficked ... they deserve protection and resources, not punishment by expulsion. ... Having forced women into destitution, the government first criminalised those who begged. Now it is trying to use prostitution as a way to make deportation of the vulnerable more acceptable. We will not allow such injustice to go unchallenged.

== Retirement and final years, 2001–2014 ==
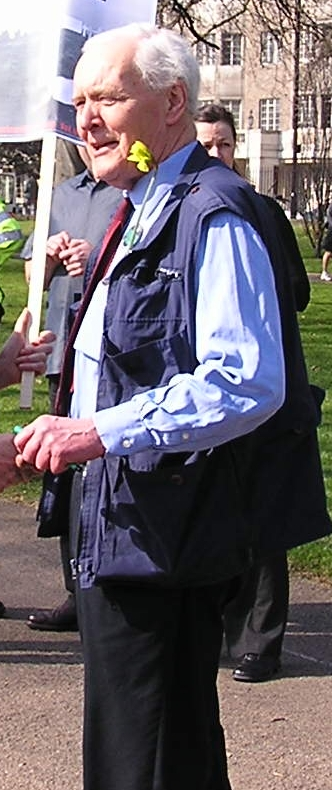
Benn about to join the March 2005 anti-war demonstration in London

Benn chose not to seek re-election at the 2001 general election, saying he was "leaving parliament in order to spend more time on politics." Along with former Prime Minister Edward Heath, Benn was permitted by the Speaker to continue using the House of Commons Library and Members' refreshment facilities. Shortly after his retirement, he became the President of the Stop the War Coalition. He became a leading figure of the British opposition to the War in Afghanistan from 2001 and the Iraq War, and in February 2003 he travelled to Baghdad to meet Saddam Hussein. The interview was broadcast on British television.

He spoke against the war at the February 2003 protest in London organised by the Stop the War Coalition, with police saying it was the biggest ever demonstration in the UK with about 750,000 marchers, and the organisers estimating nearly a million people participating. In February 2004 and 2008, he was re-elected President of the Stop the War Coalition.

He toured with a one-man stage show and appeared a few times each year in a two-man show with folk singer Roy Bailey. In 2003, his show with Bailey was voted 'Best Live Act' at the BBC Radio 2 Folk Awards. In 2002, he opened the "Left Field" stage at the Glastonbury Festival. He continued to speak at each subsequent festival; attending one of his speeches was described as a "Glastonbury rite of passage". In October 2003, he was a guest of British Airways on the last scheduled Concorde flight from New York City to London. In June 2005, he was a panellist on a special edition of BBC One's Question Time edited entirely by a school-age film crew selected by a BBC competition.

On 21 June 2005, Benn presented a programme on democracy as part of the Channel 5 series Big Ideas That Changed The World. He presented a left-wing view of democracy as the means to pass power from the "wallet to the ballot". He argued that traditional social democratic values were under threat in an increasingly globalised world in which powerful institutions such as the International Monetary Fund, the World Bank and the European Commission are unelected and unaccountable to those whose lives they affect daily.

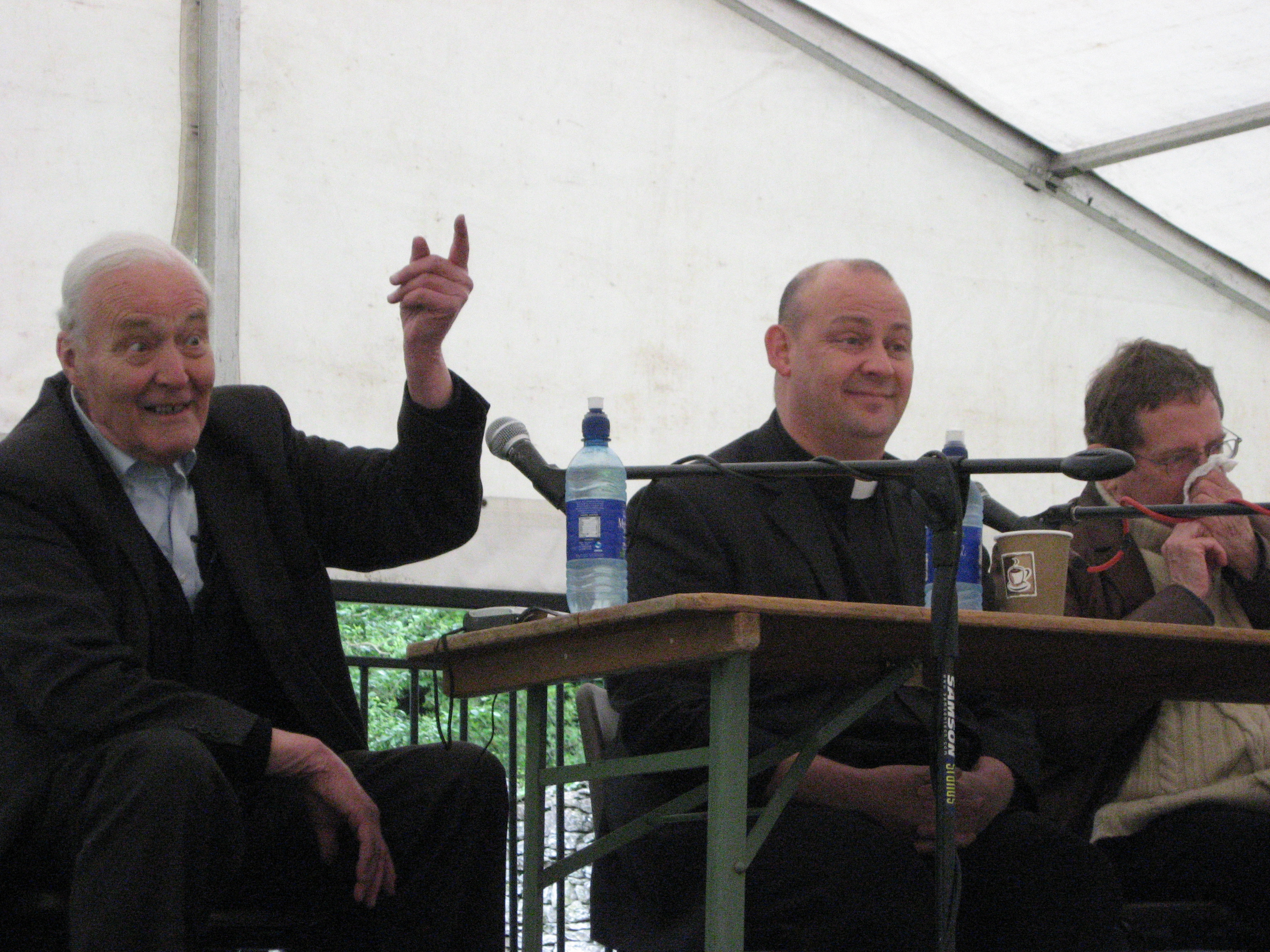
Tony Benn and Giles Fraser speaking at Levellers' Day, Burford, 17 May 2008

On 27 September 2005, Benn became ill while attending the annual Labour Party Conference in Brighton and was taken by ambulance to the Royal Sussex County Hospital after being treated by paramedics on-the-scene at the Brighton Centre. Benn reportedly fell and struck his head. He was kept in hospital for observation and was described as being in a "comfortable condition". He was subsequently fitted with an artificial pacemaker to help regulate his heartbeat.

In a list compiled by the magazine New Statesman in 2006, he was voted twelfth in the list of "Heroes of our Time". In September 2006, Benn joined the "Time to Go" demonstration in Manchester the day before the final Labour Party Conference with Tony Blair as Leader of the Labour Party, with the aim of persuading the Government to withdraw troops from Iraq, to refrain from attacking Iran and to reject replacing the Trident missile and submarines with a new system. He spoke to the demonstrators in the rally afterwards. In 2007, he appeared in an extended segment in the Michael Moore film Sicko giving comments about democracy, social responsibility and healthcare, saying "If we can find the money to kill people, we can find the money to help people." A poll by the BBC Two The Daily Politics programme in January 2007 selected Benn as the UK's "Political Hero" with 38% of the vote, narrowly defeating Margaret Thatcher, who had 35%.

For the 2007 Labour Party leadership election, Benn backed the left-wing MP John McDonnell in his unsuccessful bid. In September 2007, Benn called for the government to hold a referendum on the EU Reform Treaty. In October 2007, aged 82, and when it appeared that a general election was about to be held, Benn reportedly announced that he wanted to stand, having written to his local Constituency Labour Party offering himself as a prospective candidate for the newly drawn Kensington seat. His main opponent would have been the incumbent Conservative MP for the predecessor seat of Kensington and Chelsea, Malcolm Rifkind. However, there was no election held in 2007, and so the boundary changes did not take effect until the eventual election in 2010, when Benn was not a candidate and the new seat was won by Rifkind.

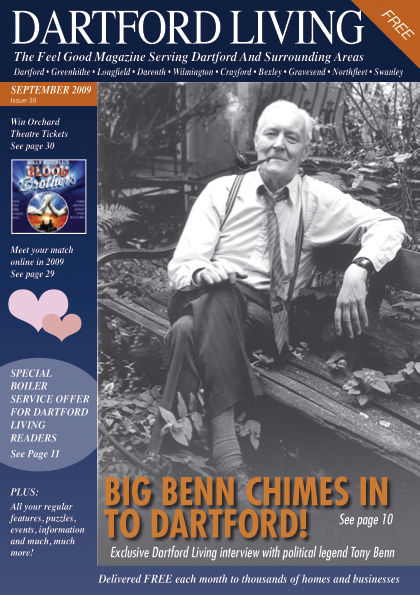
Benn on the cover of Dartford Living, September 2009

In early 2008, Benn appeared on Scottish singer-songwriter Colin MacIntyre's album The Water, reading a poem he had written himself. In September 2008, he appeared on the DVD release for the Doctor Who story The War Machines with a vignette discussing the Post Office Tower; he became the second Labour politician, after Roy Hattersley to appear on a Doctor Who DVD.

At the Stop the War Conference 2009, he described the wars in Iraq and Afghanistan as "Imperialist war(s)" and discussed the killing of American and allied troops by Iraqi or foreign insurgents, questioning whether they were in fact freedom fighters, and comparing the insurgents to a British Dad's Army, saying: "If you are invaded you have a right to self-defence, and this idea that people in Iraq and Afghanistan who are resisting the invasion are militant Muslim extremists is a complete bloody lie. I joined Dad's Army when I was sixteen, and if the Germans had arrived, I tell you, I could use a bayonet, a rifle, a revolver, and if I'd seen a German officer having a meal I'd have tossed a grenade through the window. Would I have been a freedom fighter or a terrorist?"

In an interview published in Dartford Living in September 2009, Benn was critical of the Government's decision to delay the findings of the Iraq Inquiry until after the general election, stating that "people can take into account what the inquiry has reported on but they've deliberately pushed it beyond the election. Government is responsible for explaining what it has done and I don't think we were told the truth." He also stated that local government was strangled by Margaret Thatcher and had not been liberated by New Labour.

In 2009, Benn was admitted to hospital and An Evening with Tony Benn, scheduled to take place at London's Cadogan Hall, was cancelled. He performed his show, The Writing on the Wall, with Roy Bailey at St Mary's Church, Ashford, Kent, in September 2011, as part of the arts venue's first Revelation St. Mary's Season. In July 2011 Benn was awarded an honorary doctorate from the University of Glamorgan, Wales.

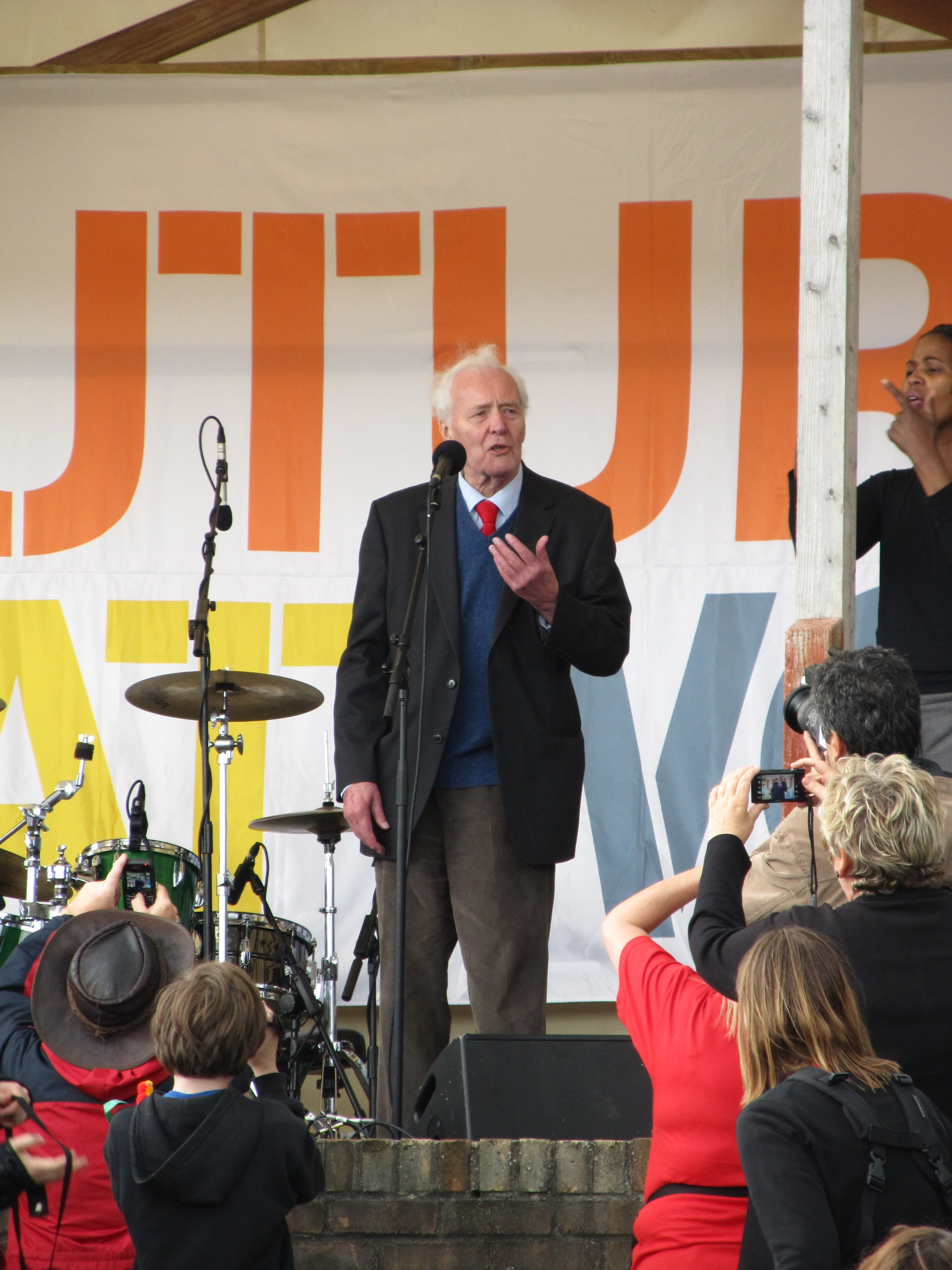
Tony Benn speaking at the Tolpuddle Martyrs' Festival and Rally 2012

Benn headed the "coalition of resistance", a group which was opposed to the UK austerity programme. In interviews in 2010 with Amy Goodman on Democracy Now! and 2013 with Afshin Rattansi on RT UK, Benn claimed that the actions of New Labour in the leadup to and aftermath of the Iraq War were such that the former Prime Minister Tony Blair should be tried for war crimes. Benn also claimed in 2010 that Blair had lost the "trust of the nation" regarding the war in Iraq.

In 2012, Benn was awarded an honorary degree from Goldsmiths, University of London. He was also the honorary president of the Goldsmiths Students' Union, who successfully campaigned for him to retract comments dismissing the Julian Assange rape allegations. In February 2013, Benn was among those who gave their support to the People's Assembly in a letter published by The Guardian newspaper. He gave a speech at the People's Assembly Conference held at Westminster Central Hall on 22 June 2013.

In 2013, Benn reiterated his previous opposition to European integration. Speaking to the Oxford Union on the alleged overshadowing of the EU debate by "UKIP and Tory backbenchers", he said:

I took the view that having fought [Europeans in the Second World War] that we should now work with them, and co-operate, and that was my first thought about it. Then how I saw how the European Union was developing, it was very obvious that what they had in mind was not democratic. ... And the way that Europe has developed is that the bankers and the multinational corporations have got very powerful positions, and if you come in on their terms, they will tell you what you can and cannot do. And that is unacceptable. My view about the European Union has always been not that I am hostile to foreigners, but that I am in favour of democracy ... I think they're building an empire there, they want us to be a part of their empire and I don't want that.

== Illness and death ==
In 1990, Benn was diagnosed with chronic lymphatic leukaemia and given three or four years to live; at this time, he kept the news of his leukaemia from everyone except his immediate family. Benn said: "When you're in parliament, you can't describe your medical condition. People immediately start wondering what your majority is and when there will be a by-election. They're very brutal." This was revealed in 2002 with the release of his 1990–2001 diaries.

Benn had a stroke in 2012, and spent much of the following year in hospital. He was reported to be "seriously ill" in hospital in February 2014. Benn died at home on 14 March 2014, surrounded by his family, at the age of 88.

Benn's funeral took place on 27 March 2014 at St Margaret's Church, Westminster. His body had lain in rest at St Mary Undercroft in the Palace of Westminster the night before the funeral service. The service ended with the singing of "The Red Flag". His body was then cremated; the ashes were expected to be buried alongside those of his wife at the family home near Steeple, Essex.

Figures from across the political spectrum praised Benn following his death, and the leaders of all three major political parties (the Conservatives, Labour and the Liberal Democrats) in the United Kingdom paid tribute.

Conservative leader and Prime Minister David Cameron said:

... he was an extraordinary man: a great writer, a brilliant speaker, extraordinary in Parliament, and a great life of public and political and parliamentary service. I mean, I disagreed with most of what he said. But he was always engaging and interesting, and you were never bored when reading or listening to him, and the country a great campaigner, a great writer, and someone who I'm sure whose words will be followed keenly for many, many years to come.

Deputy Prime Minister, Nick Clegg called Benn an "astonishing, iconic figure" and a "veteran parliamentarian, he was a great writer, he had great warmth and he had great conviction ... his political life will be looked back on with affection and admiration".

Leader of the Opposition and Labour leader Ed Miliband, who knew Benn personally as a family friend, said:

I think Tony Benn will be remembered as a champion of the powerless, as a conviction politician, as somebody of deep principle and integrity. The thing about Tony Benn is that you always knew what he stood for, and who he stood up for. And I think that's why he was admired right across the political spectrum. There are people who agreed with him and disagreed with him, including in my own party, but I think people admired that sense of conviction and integrity that shone through from Tony Benn.

== Personal life ==
Benn was a teetotaler. He became a vegetarian in 1980 (then in his 50s) and was reportedly distraught when the Chicago Town Deep Dish Triple Cheese Pizza he had eaten two of daily for years was discontinued. Benn was known for his "fondness for a mug of tea and a pipe". He used large tea mugs and said he drank one pint per hour, joking that throughout his life he had drunk enough tea to "float the QE2". In 2003, Benn participated in the Royal Society of Chemistry's tasting event on how to make a cup of tea.

== Diaries and biographies ==
Benn was a prolific diarist. Nine volumes of his diaries have been published. The final volume was published in 2013. Collections of his speeches and writings were published as Arguments for Socialism (1979), Arguments for Democracy (1981), (both edited by Chris Mullin), Fighting Back (1988) and (with Andrew Hood) Common Sense (1993), as well as Free Radical: New Century Essays (2004). In August 2003, London DJ Charles Bailey created an album of Benn's speeches (ISBN 1-904734-03-0) set to ambient groove.

He made public several episodes of audio diaries he made during his time in Parliament and after retirement, entitled The Benn Tapes, broadcast originally on BBC Radio 4. Short series have been played periodically on BBC Radio 4 Extra. A major biography was written by Jad Adams and published by Macmillan in 1992; it was updated to cover the intervening 20 years and reissued by Biteback Publishing in 2011: Tony Benn: A Biography (ISBN 0-333-52558-2). A more recent "semi-authorised" biography with a foreword by Benn was published in 2001: David Powell, Tony Benn: A Political Life, Continuum Books (ISBN 978-0826464156). An autobiography, Dare to be a Daniel: Then and Now, Hutchinson (ISBN 978-0099471530), a reference to the Old Testament prophet in the lions' den, was published in 2004.

There are substantial essays on Benn in the Dictionary of Labour Biography by Phillip Whitehead, Greg Rosen (eds), Politicos Publishing, 2001 (ISBN 978-1902301181) and in Labour Forces: From Ernie Bevin to Gordon Brown, Kevin Jefferys (ed.), I.B. Tauris Publishing, 2002 (ISBN 978-1860647437). American Michael Moore dedicates his book Mike's Election Guide 2008 (ISBN 978-0141039817) to Benn, with the words: "For Tony Benn, keep teaching us".

On 5 March 2019, it was announced that a large political archive of Benn's speeches, diaries, letters, pamphlets, recordings and ephemera had been accepted in lieu of £210,000 inheritance tax and allocated to the British Library. The audio recordings total to thousands of hours of content.

== Plaques ==
During his final years in Parliament, Benn placed three plaques within the Houses of Parliament. Two are in a room between the Central Lobby and Strangers' Gallery that holds a permanent display about the suffragettes. The first was placed in 1995. The second was placed in 1996 and is dedicated to all who work within the Houses of Parliament.

The third is dedicated to Emily Wilding Davison, who died for the cause of "Votes for women", and was placed in the broom cupboard next to the Undercroft Chapel, where Davison is said to have hidden during the night of the 1911 census to establish her address as the House of Commons.

In 2011, Benn unveiled a plaque in Highbury, North London, to commemorate the Peasants' Revolt of 1381.

== Legacy ==
In Bristol, where Benn first served as a member of parliament, a number of tributes exist in his honour. A bust of him was unveiled in Bristol's City Hall in 2005. In 2012 Transport House on Victoria Street, headquarters of Unite the Union's regional office, was officially renamed Tony Benn House and opened by Benn himself. As of 2015 he appears, alongside other famous people associated with the city, on the reverse of the Bristol pound's £B5 banknote.

Benn told the Socialist Review in 2007:

I'd like to have on my gravestone: "He encouraged us." I'm proud to have been in the parliament that introduced the health service, the welfare state and voted against means testing. I did my maiden speech on nationalising the steel industry, put down the first motion for the boycott of South African goods, and resigned from the shadow cabinet in 1958 because of their support for nuclear weapons.

I think you do plant a few acorns, and I have lived to see one or two trees growing: gay rights, freedom of information, CND. I'm not claiming them for myself but you feel you have encouraged other people and see the arguments developing.

I'm not ashamed of making mistakes. I've made a million mistakes and they're all in the diary. When we edit the diary—which is cut to around 10 per cent—every mistake has to be printed because people look to see if you do. I would be ashamed if I thought I'd ever said anything I didn't believe to get on, but making mistakes is part of life, isn't it?

Benn was widely seen as a key proponent of democratic socialism. He was described as "one of the few UK politicians to have become more left-wing after holding ministerial office". Harold Wilson, his former boss, maintained that Benn was the only man he knew who "immatures with age".

He has been cited as being a key mentor to future leader of the Labour Party Jeremy Corbyn, with his Shadow Chancellor John McDonnell commenting that "they would discuss everything under the sun. Jeremy was very close to Tony right up until the end." Corbyn was elected as leader of the Labour Party a little over a year after Benn's death, an act which Hilary Benn said would have made his father feel "thrilled".

== Styles and arms ==
- Anthony Wedgwood Benn, Esq. (1925 – 12 January 1942)
- The Hon. Anthony Wedgwood Benn (12 January 1942 – 30 November 1950)
- The Hon. Anthony Wedgwood Benn, MP (30 November 1950 – 17 November 1960)
- The Rt Hon. The Viscount Stansgate (17 November 1960 – 31 July 1963)
- Anthony Wedgwood Benn, Esq. (31 July – 20 August 1963)
- Anthony Wedgwood Benn, Esq., MP (20 August 1963 – 1964)
- The Rt Hon. Anthony Wedgwood Benn, MP (1964 – October 1973)
- The Rt Hon. Tony Benn, MP (October 1973 – 9 June 1983)
- The Rt Hon. Tony Benn (9 June 1983 – 1 March 1984)
- The Rt Hon. Tony Benn, MP (1 March 1984 – 14 May 2001)
- The Rt Hon. Tony Benn (14 May 2001 – 14 March 2014)

=== Arms ===
Coat of arms of Tony Benn
Notes The arms shown with the coronet of a viscount, as borne by Benn between 1960 and 1963. Coronet that of a viscount Escutcheon Argent two Barrulets Gules between in chief as many Dragons' Heads erased and in base a Pencil and Pen in saltire proper tied with a Lace Azure pendent therefrom a Torteau charged with Figures "1914".

== Bibliography ==
- Marr, Andrew (2007). A History of Modern Britain. Macmillan. ISBN 978-0-330-51147-6.

=== Works by Tony Benn ===
- Speeches, Spokesman Books (1974); ISBN 0851240917
- Levellers and the English Democratic Tradition, Spokesman Books (1976); ISBN 978-0-85124-633-8
- Why America Needs Democratic Socialism, Spokesman Books (1978); ISBN 978-0-85124-266-8
- Prospects, Amalgamated Union of Engineering Workers, Technical, Administrative and Supervisory Section (1979)
- Case for Constitutional Civil Service, Institute for Workers' Control (1980); ISBN 978-0-901740-67-0
- Case for Party Democracy, Institute for Workers' Control (1980); ISBN 978-0-901740-70-0
- Arguments for Socialism, Penguin Books (1980); ISBN 978-0-14-005489-7
- & Chris Mullin, Arguments for Democracy, Jonathan Cape (1981); ISBN 978-0-224-01878-4
- European Unity: A New Perspective, Spokesman Books (1981) ISBN 978-0-85124-326-9
- Parliament and Power: Agenda for a Free Society, Verso Books (1982); ISBN 978-0-86091-057-2
- Fighting Back: Speaking Out for Socialism in the Eighties, Hutchinson, (1988) ISBN 0091737923
- The Future for Socialism, Fount (1991) ISBN 0006275834
- & Andrew Hood, Common Sense: New Constitution for Britain, Hutchinson (1993)
- Free Radical: New Century Essays, Continuum International Publishing (2004); ISBN 978-0-8264-7400-1
- Dare to Be a Daniel: Then and Now, Hutchinson (2004); ISBN 978-0-09-179999-1
- Letters to my Grandchildren: Thoughts on the Future, Arrow Books (2010); ISBN 978-0-09-953909-4

=== Diaries ===
- Out of the Wilderness: Diaries 1963–67, Hutchinson (1987); ISBN 978-0-09-170660-9
- Office Without Power: Diaries 1968–72, Hutchinson (1988); ISBN 978-0-09-173647-7
- Against the Tide: Diaries 1973–76, Hutchinson (1989); ISBN 978-0-09-173775-7
- Conflicts of Interest: Diaries 1977–80, Hutchinson (1990); ISBN 978-0-09-174321-5
- The End of an Era: Diaries 1980–90, Hutchinson (1992); ISBN 978-0-09-174857-9
- Years of Hope: Diaries 1940–62, Hutchinson (1994); ISBN 978-0-09-178534-5
- The Benn Diaries: Single Volume Edition 1940–90, Hutchinson (1995); ISBN 978-0-09-179223-7
- Free at Last!: Diaries 1991–2001, Hutchinson (2002); ISBN 978-0-09-179352-4
- More Time for Politics: Diaries 2001–2007, Hutchinson (2007); ISBN 978-0-09-951705-4
- A Blaze of Autumn Sunshine: The Last Diaries, Hutchinson (2013); ISBN 978-0-09-194387-5

== See also ==
- Labour Representation Committee (2004)
- List of British republicans
- Republicanism in the United Kingdom
- Socialist Campaign Group

Parliament of the United Kingdom
Preceded by Stafford Cripps	MP for Bristol South East; 1950–1960	Succeeded by Malcolm St Clair
Preceded by Peter Baker	Baby of the House; 1950	Succeeded by Thomas Teevan
Preceded by Thomas Teevan	Baby of the House; 1951–1954	Succeeded by John Eden
Preceded by Malcolm St Clair	MP for Bristol South East; 1963–1983	Constituency abolished
Preceded by Eric Varley	MP for Chesterfield; 1984–2001	Succeeded by Paul Holmes
Political offices
Preceded by Reginald Bevins	Postmaster General; 1964–1966	Succeeded by Edward Short
Preceded by Frank Cousins	Minister of Technology; 1966–1970	Succeeded by Geoffrey Rippon
Preceded by Peter Walker	Secretary of State for Industry; 1974–1975	Succeeded by Eric Varley
Preceded by Eric Varley	Secretary of State for Energy; 1975–1979	Succeeded by David Howell
Party political offices
Preceded by Brian Abel-Smith	Chair of the Fabian Society; 1964–1965	Succeeded by Peter Townsend
Preceded by Ian Mikardo	Chairman of the Labour Party; 1971–1972	Succeeded by William Simpson
Non-profit organisation positions
New office	President of the Stop the War Coalition; 2001–2014	Succeeded by Brian Eno
Peerage of the United Kingdom
Preceded by William Wedgwood Benn	Viscount Stansgate; 1960–1963	Disclaimed Title next held by Stephen Benn
