= Malcolm St Clair (politician) =

British politician

Member of Parliament for Bristol South East
- In office 4 May 1961 – 31 July 1963
- Preceded by: Tony Benn
- Succeeded by: Tony Benn

Personal details
- Born: Malcolm Archibald James St Clair; 16 February 1927
- Died: 1 February 2004 (aged 76)
- Party: Conservative
- Spouse: Mary-Jean Rosalie Alice Hargreaves (m. 1952)
- Children: Hugh Alan Charles (1957), Andrew David Paul (1960), and Vanessa Alice Rosabelle (1971)
- Education: Eton College

Military service
- Allegiance: United Kingdom
- Branch/service: British Army
- Rank: Lieutenant Colonel
- Unit: Territorial Army, Royal Armoured Corps, Royal Scots Greys, Royal Gloucestershire Hussars

Malcolm Archibald James St Clair (pronounced "Sinclair"; 16 February 1927 – 1 February 2004) was a British Conservative Party politician and Army officer.

== Early life ==
Born on 16 February 1927, St Clair was the son of Major-General G.P. St Clair. He was educated at Sandroyd School and Eton College.

After leaving school, St Clair joined the Royal Armoured Corps as a trooper and in 1946 was commissioned as an officer into the Royal Scots Greys. He left the Army in 1948.

== Political career ==
St Clair served as honorary secretary to Winston Churchill from 1948 to 1950, before returning to run his family's dairy farm at Tetbury in Gloucestershire.

In 1955, he stood unsuccessfully as a Conservative candidate at the London County Council elections, in Islington East. At the 1959 general election he stood as Conservative candidate in Bristol South East, but he lost to the sitting Labour Member of Parliament Tony Benn, whose majority was nearly 6,000 votes.

=== Tony Benn peerage disqualification ===
Tony Benn's father died on 17 November 1960, and Benn inherited his peerage as Viscount Stansgate, with an automatic seat in the House of Lords. This disqualified Benn from sitting in the House of Commons, triggering a by-election on 4 May 1961. Benn, who wished to be allowed to disclaim his peerage, defied his inability to sit in the Commons by standing at the election, and he and St Clair were the only two candidates. St Clair's campaign displayed posters near every polling station warning voters that Benn was disqualified and that any votes for him would have no effect. Benn nevertheless won the election with nearly 70% of the votes and an increased majority of over 13,000.

However, an Election Court considered what to do about the result, found that Benn was disqualified from being elected and that the voters were aware of this, and awarded the seat to St. Clair as the only duly qualified candidate. At the time, St Clair was himself Master of Sinclair, being heir presumptive (1957–1968) to his second cousin Charles St Clair, 17th Lord Sinclair, one of the Scottish representative peers in the House of Lords. Should the 17th Lord have died, St Clair would himself have been elevated to the peerage and disqualified from the Commons.

Outside Parliament, Benn continued to campaign for a change in the law to allow him to disclaim his peerage and return to the Commons, and eventually the Conservative government agreed. The Peerage Act 1963, making such a change in the law, was given the Royal Assent and became law shortly after 6 p.m. on 31 July 1963. Benn was the first peer to disclaim his title, at 6.22 p.m. that day. St Clair had already given an undertaking that he would respect the wishes of the people of Bristol South East if Benn became eligible to take his seat again, so he immediately resigned by accepting the office of Steward of the Manor of Northstead. This triggered another by-election at which St Clair did not stand, and indeed there was no Conservative or Liberal candidate. On 20 August 1963, Benn was returned to the Commons with nearly 80% of the votes.

== Later life ==
St Clair served in the Territorial Army as a Major in the Royal Gloucestershire Hussars, and as Lieutenant-Colonel from 1967 to 1969. He was High Sheriff of Gloucestershire in 1972.

He died on 1 February 2004, aged 76.

== Personal life ==
In June 1955, St Clair married Rosalie Alice, daughter of Wing-Commander C.L. Hargreaves and granddaughter of Alice Liddell. He lived at Upton House, Tetbury, Gloucestershire, and 28 Chesham Place, London. He was a member of the Cavalry Club. He never became Lord Sinclair, the title of Master transferring from him to the then Lord's first son on his birth in 1968.

Parliament of the United Kingdom
| Preceded by Tony Benn | Member of Parliament for Bristol South East; 1961–1963 | Succeeded by Tony Benn |
