= Viscount Stansgate =

Viscountcy in the Peerage of the United Kingdom

- Creation date: 20 January 1942
- Created by: George VI
- Peerage: Peerage of the United Kingdom
- First holder: William Wedgwood Benn
- Present holder: Stephen Benn
- Heir apparent: Hon. Daniel Benn
- Remainder to: Heirs male of the first viscount's body, lawfully begotten
- Former seat: Stansgate Abbey
- Motto: Deo Favente ("With God's favour")

Viscount Stansgate, of Stansgate in the County of Essex, is a title in the Peerage of the United Kingdom. It was created in 1942 for the Labour politician, former Secretary of State for India and future Secretary of State for Air, William Wedgwood Benn. He was the second son of Sir John Benn, 1st Baronet, of The Old Knoll. Stansgate's eldest son and heir apparent, Michael Benn, was later killed in the Second World War. Consequently, he was succeeded in the title by his second son, the Labour politician Tony Benn, who disclaimed the peerage on 31 July 1963, the day the Peerage Act 1963 passed into law and made it possible for him to do so. As of 2022, the title is held by Tony Benn's eldest son, Stephen Benn, 3rd Viscount Stansgate.

Stansgate is a hamlet near the village of Steeple, Essex, on the southern side of the River Blackwater estuary. The village has been home to several generations of the Benn family since about 1900. They live in Stansgate Abbey, described by Chris Mullin as "an ungainly, rambling 1920s house in a stunning location".

== Viscounts Stansgate (1942—present) ==
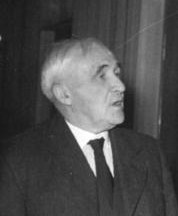
William Wedgwood Benn, 1st Viscount Stansgate

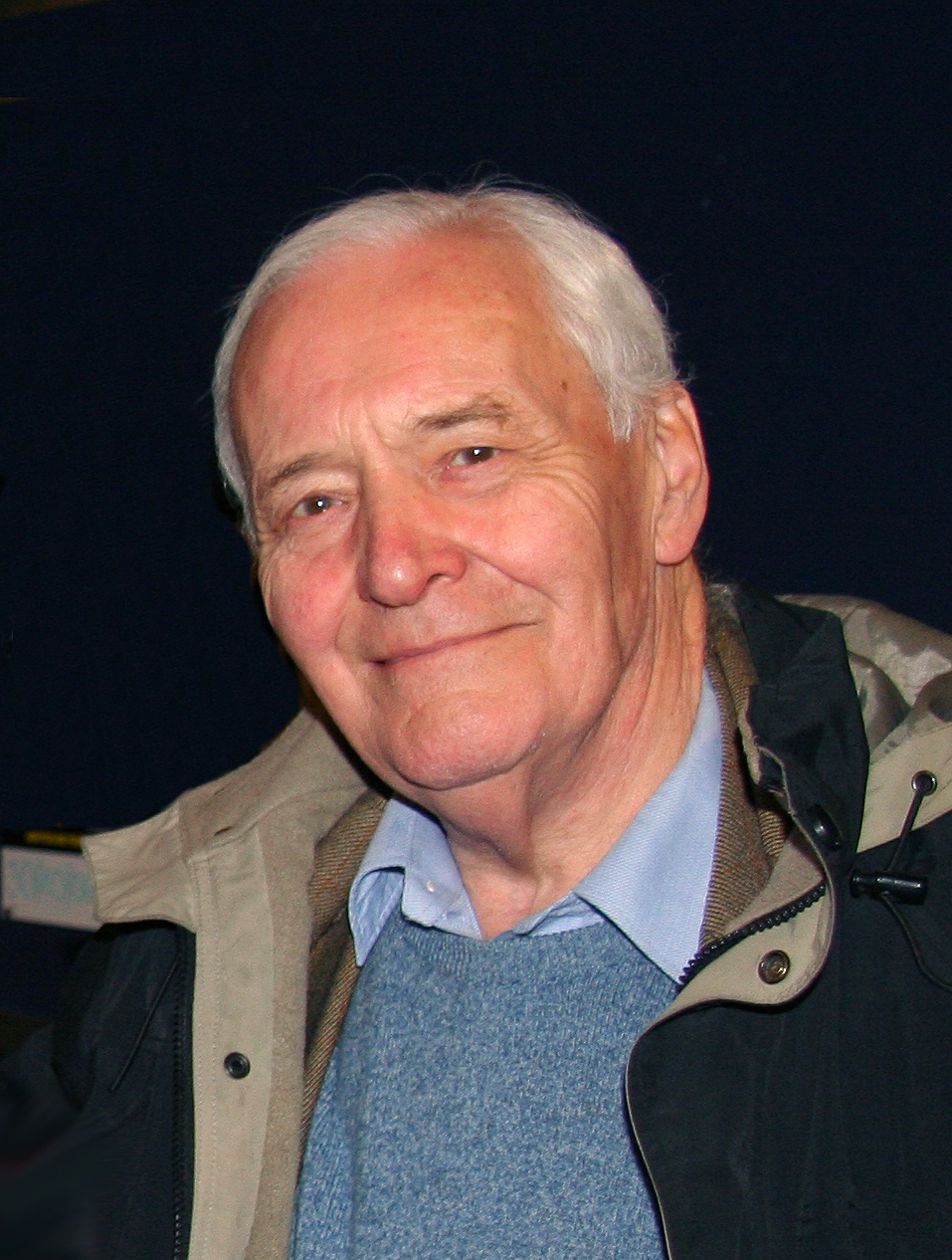
Tony Benn, briefly and unwillingly 2nd Viscount Stansgate

- William Wedgwood Benn, 1st Viscount Stansgate (1877–1960)
  - Hon. Michael Julius Wedgwood Benn (1921–1944)
  - Anthony Neil Wedgwood Benn, 2nd Viscount Stansgate (1925–2014) (disclaimed 1963)
    - Stephen Michael Wedgwood Benn, 3rd Viscount Stansgate (b. 1951)
      - (1) Hon. Daniel John Wedgwood Benn (b. 1991)
    - (2) Rt Hon. Hilary James Wedgwood Benn (b. 1953)
      - (3) James Leon C. Benn (b. 1983)
      - (4) Jonathan Anthony C. Benn (b. 1987)
    - (5) Hon. Joshua William Wedgwood Benn (b. 1958)
      - (6) William Wedgwood Benn (b. 1984)
  - Hon. David Julian Wedgwood Benn (1928–2017)
    - (7) Piers Michael Wedgwood Benn (b. 1962)

The heir apparent is the present holder's son, the Hon. Daniel John Wedgwood Benn (born 1991).

== Arms ==
Coat of arms of Viscount Stansgate
Crest On a rock a spear erect proper, flowing therefrom a pennon azure, charged with the word “Onward”, letters or. Escutcheon Argent, two barrulets indented gules, between in chief as many dragons’ heads erased and in base a pencil and a pen in saltire proper, tied with a lace azure, pendent therefrom a torteau, charged with a figure “1914” or. Motto Deo Favente (By God's favour).

== See also ==
- Benn baronets, of The Old Knoll
