= Reception history =

The term reception history refers to the historical progression of responses to a person, cultural object, or event over time. It has been applied to classical music, literature, and the Bible.

== In classical music ==
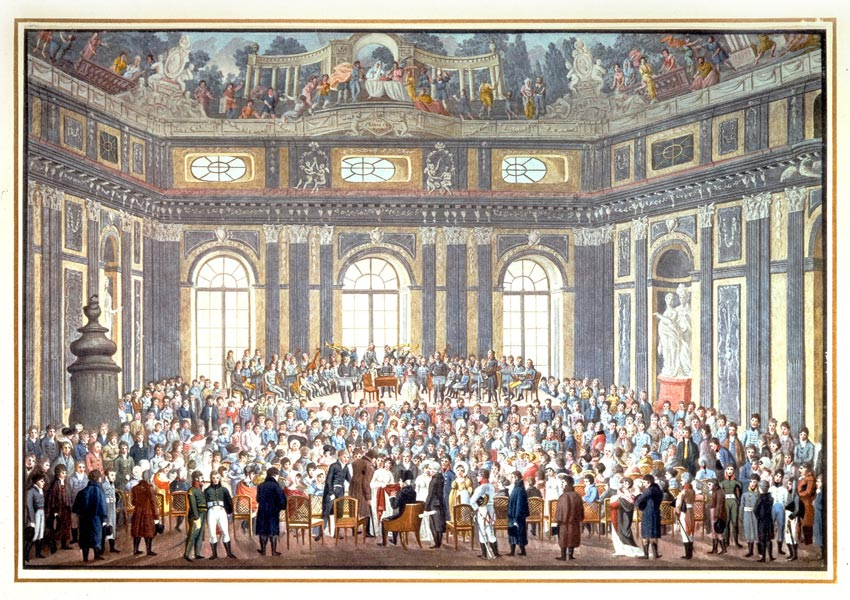
An 1808 performance of the oratorio The Creation in honor of the elderly composer Joseph Haydn. Haydn died the following year and a long decline of his reputation set in.

In classical music, the reception history of a work of music, or the body of work created by a composer, is the history of how listeners and performers have reacted to the work over time: how it was heard, performed, and evaluated.

Reception history is studied by musicologists using various sources of evidence, such as the writings of critics and other composers, both during the composer's lifetime and later on. It is also possible, in many cases, to assess esteem by consulting old concert programs, or (for later work) commercial recordings. In the days before copyright law, a clear indicator of esteem was the proliferation of unauthorized editions issued by other than the original publishers. Prior to the 19th century, many works circulated in manuscript, and the monasteries of Europe often included music libraries filled with such works, kept both for use in worship and in some cases for the monks' entertainment (e.g., Haydn symphonies). Some of these collections have survived to the present day and can be consulted.

A theme of reception history is the changes over time in the degree to which the work of a composer is valued. For example, the composer Johann Adolph Hasse was very popular in his own time, but his work eventually largely disappeared from the musical scene. Joseph Haydn's music was also very popular in his day, gradually went into eclipse during the 19th century, and enjoyed a revival starting in about the mid 20th century. The music of Gustav Mahler likewise suffered relative neglect after his death but recovered strongly with the "Mahler boom" of the 1960s, led by (among others) Leonard Bernstein. Franz Schubert's music was only moderately well known during his short lifetime; he joined the pantheon of great composers only after the posthumous discovery of his work by Robert Schumann and others.

The reception accorded to a composer of bygone times may be strongly influenced by contemporary musical values. Thus when Romanticism achieved dominance in the 19th century, the prominence of the Classical composers (not just Haydn, but also Wolfgang Amadeus Mozart) declined. The taste of a particular era may be such that its performers and editors may feel that the work of an earlier composer is in need of alteration and improvement. Thus when Baron Gottfried van Swieten sponsored performances of works by Handel in the late 18th century, he engaged Mozart to create revised versions, with added wind parts that brought the music closer to late 18th century musical tastes (for Mozart's version of Messiah, see Der Messias). Later on, Messiah was adapted to late 19th century taste, with even more substantial musical forces, by Ebenezer Prout and others. Then, with still further changing tastes in the late 20th century, musicians sought to return, to the extent possible, to Handel's original conception and sound palette; see Historically informed performance.

== In literature ==
For literature, reception history can be guided by sources similar to those cited above for classical music: the writings of critics and fellow authors, publication history, unauthorized editions (see Bad quarto), and indeed versions of the author's work rewritten for changing tastes.

For discussion of the reception of works of literature and their authors see articles listed in Category:Reception of writers. Some representative articles are the following:

- Reception history of Jane Austen
- John Milton's reception history
- Reputation of William Shakespeare

== The Bible ==
The Bible forms, in different versions, the primary document used in the religions of Christianity and Judaism. According to Brennan Breed, "the reception history [of the Bible] explores all the different ways that people have received, appropriated, and used biblical texts throughout history." Breed draws an important distinction between the study of biblical reception history and biblical criticism, as follows:

Reception history is often contrasted to the practice of biblical criticism—the work of discerning the original text of the Bible—and the attempt to understand what biblical texts originally meant to their authors and audiences in the ancient world. This work involves ancient literary conventions as well as broader political, economic, and cultural forces that existed when the texts were produced.

For example, a scholar doing biblical criticism would deny that the serpent in Gen[esis] 3 is the devil, as the ancient Israelites did not seem to believe in a particular embodiment of cosmic evil. In addition, the narrator makes no judgment about the serpent. A reception scholar, however, might take interest in the perception of the serpent as an embodiment of evil and would identify the interpretive twists and turns that led to this reading, whether the original text and times would have endorsed the notion.

== See also ==
- Reception theory—the study of reception history as a technical/theoretical topic within the humanities.
