= Common Sense (Benn and Hood book) =

1993 book by Tony Benn and Andrew Hood

- Editor: Ruth Winstone
- Author: Tony Benn; Andrew Hood
- Language: English
- Genre: Non-fiction
- Publisher: Hutchinson
- Publication date: 1993
- Publication place: United Kingdom
- ISBN: 0-09-177308-3

Common Sense, subtitled A New Constitution for Britain is a book written by the British Labour politician Tony Benn and Andrew Hood.

== Cause ==
The book was written after the first reading in the House of Commons of the United Kingdom of Benn's Commonwealth of Britain Bill in 1991. It includes the full text of the bill as an appendix. The main content of the book discusses the reasoning behind the bill. Benn wrote an article, summarising the book's contents, published in Keith Sutherland's book The Rape of the Constitution? (2000).

The bill proposed establishing the United Kingdom as a secular state and thus disestablishing the Church of England, removing the British Crown as an element of government, but continuing government with democratically elected members from constituencies, each seat electing a male and a female. Various other reforms were proposed along liberal lines, such as a single age of consent, abolition of blasphemy laws, and equal rights in law for homosexuals.

The introduction of the bill was intended more for public discussion than with any real hope that it would become law.

== Editions ==
- Benn, Tony; Hood, Andrew (1993), Winstone, Ruth (ed.), Common Sense, Hutchinson, ISBN 0-09-177308-3

== See also ==
- Tony Benn
- Commonwealth of Britain Bill
- Disestablishmentarianism
- Labour for a Republic
- Republic (political organisation)
