= Bennism =

Political ideology of Tony Benn

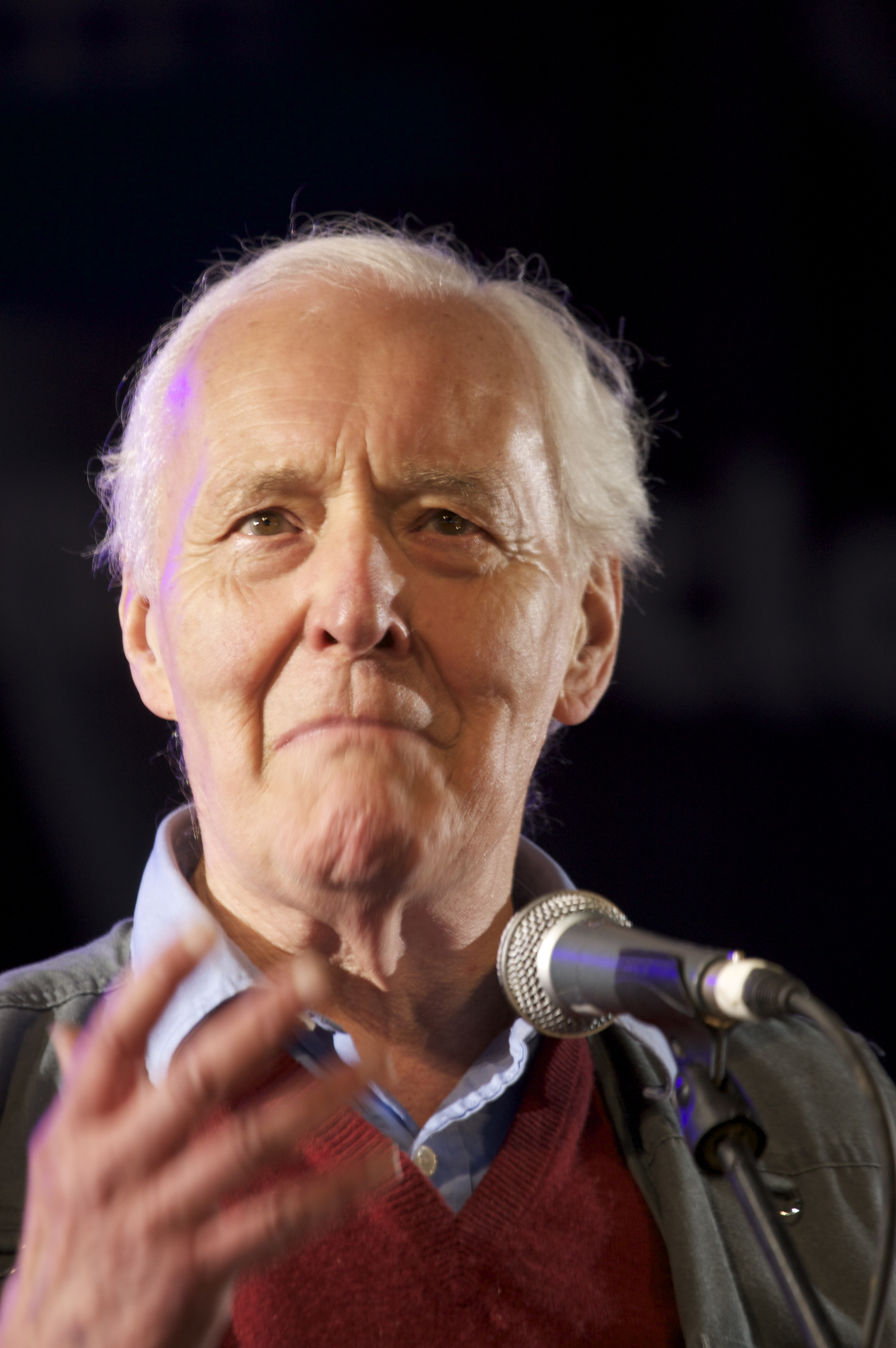
Tony Benn speaking at Glastonbury Left Field in June 2008.

In British politics, Bennism describes the views of Tony Benn (1980s), and the wing of the Labour party that supported him, known as Bennites. Not amounting to a coherent ideology, the term is typically used to describe the 1974–1981 program that Benn and his circle developed to transition the British economy from corporate capitalism into a form of democratic socialism that Benn described as a "home-grown British product". Bennism advocated extensive public ownership, workplace democracy, and comprehensive constitutional reform including the abolition of the monarchy in favour of a democratic republic. The term is also used to describe the "strategic recalcitrance" that Benn and his supporters demonstrated in the 1980s and beyond.

Central to Bennism is the democratisation of political and economic power through Benn's "five essential questions of democracy": "What power have you got? Where did you get it from? In whose interests do you exercise it? To whom are you accountable? And how can we get rid of you?" The ideology draws from Christian socialist traditions and British radical movements including the Levellers and Diggers, whilst advocating withdrawal from supranational institutions such as NATO and the European Union on grounds of democratic accountability. Benn's Commonwealth of Britain Bill, introduced repeatedly to Parliament from 1991 to 2001, outlined his vision for transforming the United Kingdom into a federal republic with a written constitution.

== Ideology ==
Bennism represents a form of democratic socialism that Benn described as "very much a home-grown British product which has been slowly fashioned over the centuries" and emphasised that "our socialism grew out of experience and was not handed down from above, or received from outside". Benn traced this tradition through historical radical movements including the "Levellers, Diggers and Ranters" of the English Civil War, arguing it "owed little to foreign influences".

Central to Bennism is the democratisation of political and economic power through what Benn called his "five essential questions of democracy": "What power have you got? Where did you get it from? In whose interests do you exercise it? To whom are you accountable? And how can we get rid of you?" Benn argued that "if you cannot get rid of the people who govern you, you do not live in a democratic system".

=== Economic policy ===
Bennism's economic programme centred on the Alternative Economic Strategy (AES), developed during the 1970s as a comprehensive socialist alternative to both Keynesian economics and the emerging monetarism. Benn described this as "Strategy B" in contrast to the government's deflationary "Strategy A", outlining "the real Labour policy of saving jobs, a vigorous micro-investment programme, import control, control of the banks and insurance companies, control of export, of capital, higher taxation of the rich, and Britain leaving the Common Market".

The AES comprised six inter-related elements: reflation, public ownership, economic planning, price controls, industrial democracy, and import controls. Central to this strategy was the National Enterprise Board (NEB), established in 1975 with Benn as Industry Secretary, designed to extend public control by acquiring stakes in the UK's 25 leading manufacturing firms through compulsory planning agreements. Benn called this "the most radical programme the party has prepared since 1945".

Bennite industrial democracy went beyond traditional collective bargaining to encompass worker participation in strategic decision-making. Benn supported initiatives like the Lucas Aerospace workers' alternative corporate plan of 1976, which he described as "one of the most remarkable exercises that have ever occurred in British industrial history". The Lucas Plan, where workers developed proposals for converting arms production to socially useful products, exemplified Bennite principles of democratic planning and worker control.

In Arguments for Socialism (1979), Benn argued that "the investment gap must be filled by public investment, with proper public accountability and public ownership, and that only public expenditure can convert human needs into economic demands". He advocated that "the labour movement should now adopt a strategy which meets the needs of working people by securing an extension of public ownership, industrial democracy in the organisations of work and the planning for industrial recovery". However, the AES was rejected by the Callaghan government during the 1976 sterling crisis, marking a decisive shift toward monetarist policies that Benn opposed.

=== Constitutional reform ===
A cornerstone of Bennism was comprehensive constitutional reform outlined in Benn's Commonwealth of Britain Bill, first presented to the House of Commons on 28 June 1991 and debated repeatedly until 1996. The bill proposed transforming the United Kingdom into a "democratic, federal and secular Commonwealth of Britain", effectively establishing a republic with a written constitution. Key provisions included abolishing the monarchy, establishing an elected president as head of state, creating separate national parliaments for England, Scotland and Wales, disestablishing the Church of England, and enshrining "fundamental human rights and equal representation for men and women". Benn expanded on these proposals in his 1993 book Common Sense: A New Constitution for Britain.

=== Christian socialism and philosophical foundations ===
Benn's democratic socialism was deeply rooted in Christian socialism and his family's Methodist nonconformist tradition. He described himself as a "Christian agnostic" who believed in "Jesus the prophet, not Christ the King", viewing Christianity's democratic heritage as fundamental to his politics. Academic analysis has noted that Benn's ideology drew from "a tradition of British socialism that owed little to foreign influences", tracing back through historical radical movements including the Levellers, Diggers, and Ranters of the English Civil War. Scholarly review has characterized his collected works as representing "a home-grown British product" of democratic socialism distinct from both capitalism and Soviet-style communism.

=== Foreign policy and sovereignty ===
Bennism advocated withdrawal from international organisations that Benn viewed as undemocratic or compromising parliamentary sovereignty. In Arguments for Socialism, he called for British withdrawal from NATO, Northern Ireland, and the European Economic Community. His opposition to European integration was rooted in democratic rather than nationalist principles, arguing that "Britain's continuing membership of the Community would mean the end of Britain as a completely self-governing nation and the end of our democratically elected Parliament as the supreme law making body". Benn applied his democratic accountability framework to supranational institutions, arguing that "we cannot get rid of Jacques Delors; we cannot get rid of the [European] Commission". He maintained that the issue was "not a nationalist argument" but fundamentally "a democratic argument" about parliamentary accountability to the electorate.

== Impact on the Labour Party ==
Bennism fundamentally altered the Labour Party's internal structures and ideological trajectory during the 1970s and 1980s. Benn's campaigns for greater party democracy led to significant constitutional changes, including the establishment of the electoral college system for leadership elections in 1981, which gave trade unions and constituency parties a voice alongside MPs. These reforms represented a victory for the Bennite position that party leaders should be accountable to the broader membership rather than just parliamentarians.

The 1981 deputy leadership contest, where Benn narrowly lost to Denis Healey by just 0.847%, marked the high point of Bennite influence within Labour. The campaign galvanised the Labour Left and led to the formation of the Socialist Campaign Group in 1982 as a permanent parliamentary vehicle for Bennite politics when the soft left abandoned Benn's cause.

However, Bennism also contributed to Labour's electoral difficulties during the 1980s. The ideological divisions between Bennites and the party leadership under Michael Foot were seen by many as contributing to Labour's defeat in the 1983 general election, when the party manifesto was dubbed "the longest suicide note in history".

Benn's association with far-left groups further complicated Labour's public image. He defended the Militant tendency, speaking at their 1984 rally and opposing their expulsion from the party despite pressure from Kinnock's leadership. Benn also supported Militant-controlled Liverpool City Council under Derek Hatton during their confrontation with central government over budget cuts, providing "unswerving support in their hour of struggle and need". These positions placed Benn at odds with Kinnock's efforts to modernise the party and root out entryism.

The tension culminated in Benn's unsuccessful challenge to Kinnock for the party leadership in 1988, which he described as a "campaign for socialism". Benn's diary recorded his view of Kinnock as "the great betrayer", arguing the party was "paying the price" for "soft-pedalling our advocacy for socialism". Kinnock's subsequent modernisation efforts deliberately marginalised Bennite influence as the party moved toward the centre ground.

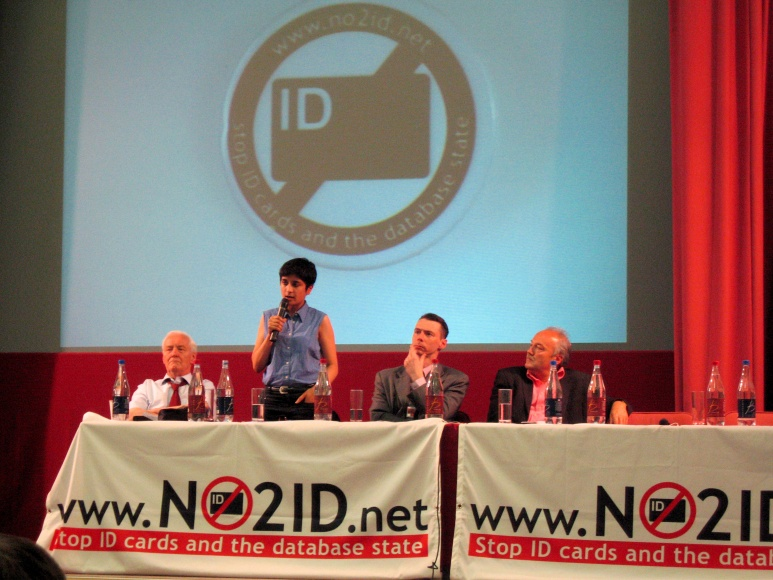
Benn at a NO2ID meeting in London in July 2005

Following his retirement from Parliament in 2001, Benn declared he was "leaving parliament in order to spend more time on politics", becoming President of the Stop the War Coalition and a prominent campaigner against the Iraq War. His opposition to military intervention predated the 2003 invasion, famously arguing during the 1998 Iraq bombing that "every Member of Parliament tonight who votes for the government motion will be consciously and deliberately accepting the responsibility for the deaths of innocent people". Benn also campaigned extensively for Palestinian rights, advocating a boycott of Israeli goods and arguing that "Britain should offer its support for this strategy by stopping all arms sales to Israel, introducing trade sanctions and a ban on all investment".

The Bennite tradition experienced a revival under Jeremy Corbyn's leadership (2015–2020), with many former Benn allies playing key roles in Corbyn's team. Academic analysis has noted the continuities between 1980s Bennism and the Corbyn project, particularly in their shared emphasis on party democracy, public ownership, and anti-imperialist foreign policy.

== Bennites ==
Other than Benn himself, the following people are often considered Bennites, but may not identify themselves as such:

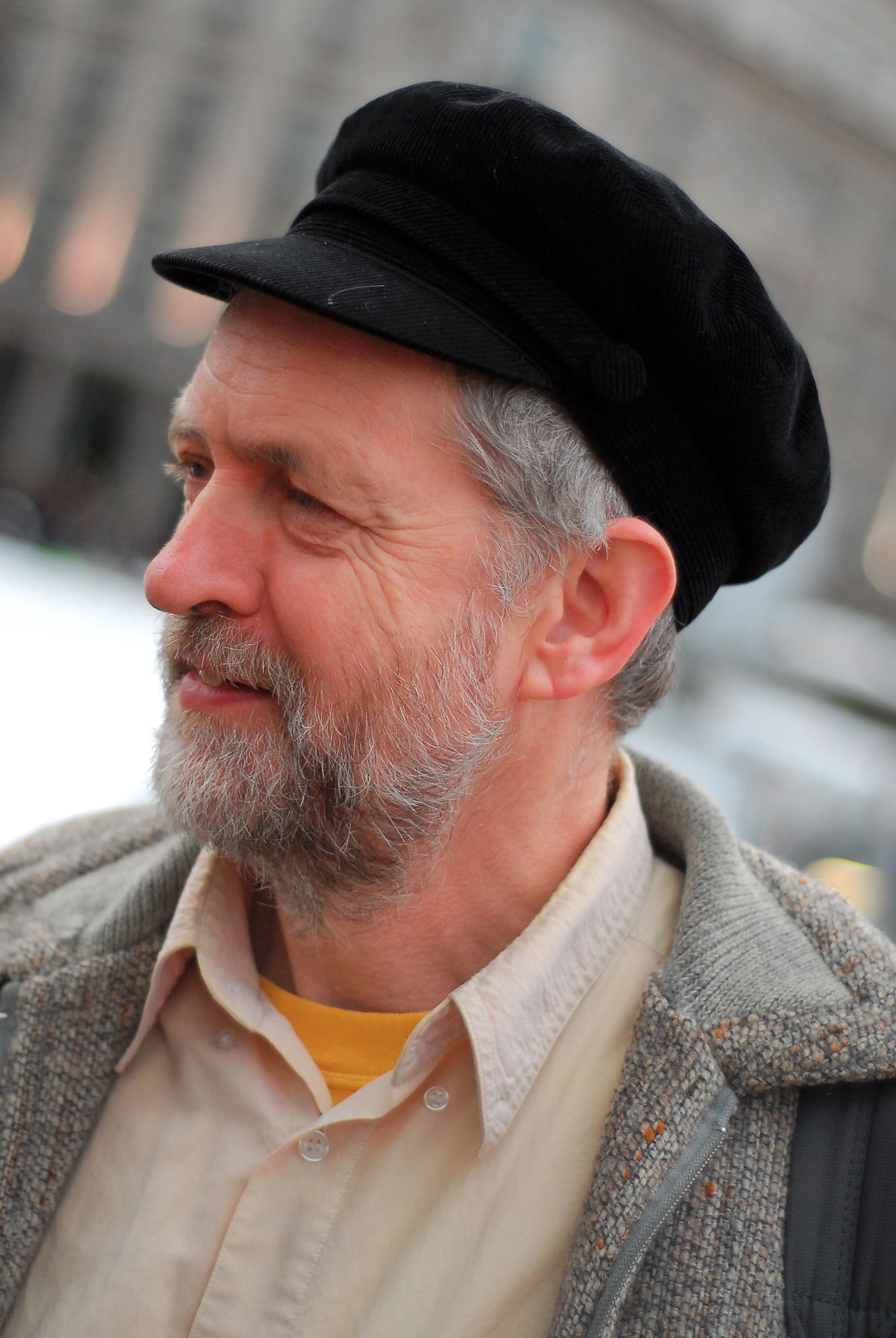
Jeremy Corbyn at a Stop The War protest in London, in February 2007.

- Jeremy Corbyn – former Leader of the Labour Party (2015–2020). Corbyn seconded Benn's Commonwealth of Britain Bill in 1991 and has been described as "the heir to Tony Benn" and "the Bennite who made it". His political positions align closely with Benn's, including support for unilateral nuclear disarmament, opposition to NATO interventions, and left-wing Euroscepticism.
- John McDonnell – Shadow Chancellor (2015–2020) and founding member of the Socialist Campaign Group established in 1982, which became the parliamentary vehicle for Bennite politics.
- Dennis Skinner – long-serving MP known as the "Beast of Bolsover", who consistently supported Benn's positions on public ownership, nuclear disarmament and democratic accountability throughout his parliamentary career.
- Diane Abbott – Britain's first black female MP and long-time ally of Corbyn, sharing Benn's commitment to anti-imperialism and democratic socialism.
- Ken Livingstone – former Mayor of London whose takeover of the Greater London Council in 1981 was inspired by Bennite politics and "intended as a blueprint for a Tony Benn triumph". Livingstone described Benn as "an inspiration and a prophet" and planned his GLC takeover following Bennite principles of municipal socialism.
- Arthur Scargill – leader of the National Union of Mineworkers during the 1984–85 miners' strike, who was supported by Benn and described as a "long-standing friend". Benn was so popular with miners that his picture appeared on the NUM Blackhall Lodge union banner, and he introduced the Miners' Amnesty Bill 1985 following the strike's defeat.

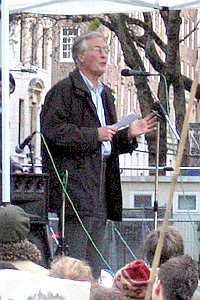
Michael Meacher giving a speech at a protest in 2005

- Jon Lansman – founder of Momentum who worked as Tony Benn's researcher and campaign organiser during the 1980s, serving as his "chief fixer" and directing both his 1981 deputy leadership campaign and 1988 leadership challenge. Academic research has identified Lansman as one of the key figures who bridged the Bennite tradition of the 1980s with contemporary Labour left politics through Momentum.
- Chris Mullin – journalist and Labour MP who edited both Arguments for Socialism (1979) and Arguments for Democracy (1981), key texts articulating Bennite ideology. As editor of Tribune newspaper from 1982, Mullin was described as "one of Tony Benn's lieutenants" and a "staunch uncompromising Bennite".
- Michael Meacher – founding member of the Socialist Campaign Group and close Benn ally who established the Labour Co-ordinating Committee with Frances Morrell in 1978. Meacher stood as the left's candidate for deputy leader in 1983 and later nominated Jeremy Corbyn in the 2015 leadership election.
- George Galloway, Labour MP 1987-2003 for Glasgow self identifies as a Bennite and was elected MP a further three times for other parties in other constituencies.

== See also ==
- 1981 Labour deputy leadership election – Benn's narrow defeat to Denis Healey that galvanised the Bennite movement
- 1988 Labour leadership election – Benn's challenge to Neil Kinnock from the left
- Campaign for Labour Party Democracy – organisation promoting democratic reforms within Labour
- Socialist Campaign Group – parliamentary vehicle for Bennite politics formed in 1982
- Commonwealth of Britain Bill – Benn's proposal for constitutional reform and republicanism
- New Left – broader international movement of which Bennism formed part
- Brownism – contrasting Labour ideology of Gordon Brown
- Corbynism – contemporary Labour left movement influenced by Bennism
- Stop the War Coalition – anti-war organisation supported by Bennites
- Tribune (magazine) – left-wing publication closely associated with the Labour left
- Bevanism - 1950s left-wing movement in the Labour Party

== Sources ==
- Gilbert, Jeremy (1 October 2021). "The End of the Road: From Bennism to Corbynism". South Atlantic Quarterly. 120 (4): 879–891. doi:10.1215/00382876-9443434. ISSN 0038-2876.
- Panitch, Leo; Leys, Colin (17 May 2001). "Emergence of Bennism". The End of Parliamentary Socialism: From New Left to New Labour. Verso. pp. 49–65. ISBN 978-1-85984-338-3.
- Freeman, Alan (20 September 2014). The Benn Heresy: Foreword by Owen Jones. Pluto Books. ISBN 978-1-78371-235-9.
