= Constitutional reform in the United Kingdom =

Change to the system of governance in the United Kingdom

There have been various proposals for constitutional reform in the United Kingdom.

== Current system ==
The United Kingdom of Great Britain and Northern Ireland is a constitutional monarchy governed via a Westminster system of parliamentary democracy. It comprises the four countries of England, Scotland, Wales and Northern Ireland.

The UK operates a system of devolution from a central UK parliament and prime minister as head of government, to the devolved legislatures of the Scottish Parliament, Senedd and Northern Ireland Assembly with their respective first ministers. In England, Greater London, combined authorities, and the counties of Cornwall and Yorkshire, have varying degrees of devolved powers. There are proposals for an England-wide or regional devolution.

The constitution of the United Kingdom is an uncodified constitution. There are two chambers of the UK parliament: the House of Commons and House of Lords. The UK has various overseas territories and crown dependencies, and is composed of three legal jurisdictions.

== Proposed reforms ==
=== Dissolution ===
- Independence of Wales and Scotland and the unification of Ireland.
- Confederation of separate sovereign states.

=== National governance ===
- Increase in devolved powers to the constituent countries of the UK such as proposed further Welsh devolution and Scottish devolution and perhaps further Northern Irish reform.
- Adopt a federal system of governance between the countries of England, Wales, Scotland and Northern Ireland.

=== Parliamentary reform ===
- Reforming the House of Lords through either modification of the appointment process, reducing the number of Lords, removing the Lords Spiritual, or abolition.
- A "Senate of Nations and Regions" to replace the House of Lords.
- Relocating Parliament or the House of Lords

=== Electoral reform ===
Electoral reform, such as by replacing the first-past-the-post voting system with proportional representation and/or lowering the voting age to 16. A referendum to change the voting system to "alternative vote" (AV) was held in 2011, but failed by a substantial margin.

=== Constitution codification ===
Codification of the UK constitution has been debated frequently, and included in a number of manifestos of political parties.

=== Reform of monarchy ===
- Reform of the monarchy, which includes abolishing the monarchy. Abolishment of the monarchy is advocated by republicanism in the UK.

=== Religious reform ===
- Ending the Church of England's status as the official church of the United Kingdom, known as disestablishment of the Church, which would make the UK a non-religious, secular state.

=== Human rights legislation ===
There have been numerous proposals to reform or replace the Human Rights Act 1998. In 2015, the Conservative government proposed a British Bill of Rights, though did not introduce legislation. In 2022, a Bill of Rights Bill was introduced in the Commons but subsequently dropped.

== See also ==
- Commonwealth of Britain Bill
- History of the constitution of the United Kingdom
