= Republicanism in the United Kingdom =

Political movement to replace the United Kingdom's monarchy with a republic

British republicans seek to replace the United Kingdom's monarchy with a republic led by an elected head of state. Monarchy has been the form of government used in the United Kingdom and its predecessor domains almost exclusively since the Middle Ages, with the exception of the Interregnum from 1649 to 1660, during which a nominally republican government did exist under the rule of Oliver and later Richard Cromwell.

After Cromwell's Protectorate fell and the monarchy was restored, governing duties were increasingly handed to Parliament, especially as a result of the Glorious Revolution of 1688. The adoption of the constitutional monarchy system made the argument for full republicanism less urgent. It was once again a topic of discussion during the late 18th century with the American Revolution, and grew more important with the French Revolution, when the concern was how to deal with the French Republic on their doorstep. This led to a widespread anti-republican movement in Britain, and the issue was dormant for a time.

Dissatisfaction with British rule led to a longer period of agitation in the early 19th century, with failed republican revolutions in Canada in the late 1830s and Ireland in 1848. This led to the Treason Felony Act in 1848, which made it illegal to advocate for republicanism. Another "significant incarnation" of republicanism broke out in the late 19th century, when Queen Victoria went into mourning and largely disappeared from public view after the death of her husband, Prince Albert. This led to questions about whether or not the institution should continue, with politicians speaking in support of abolition. This ended when Victoria returned to public duties later in the century and regained significant public support.

More recently, in the early 21st century, increasing dissatisfaction with the House of Windsor, especially after the death of Elizabeth II in 2022, has led to historic lows in public support for the monarchy. However, related polls show that the British public still prefers to retain the monarchy.

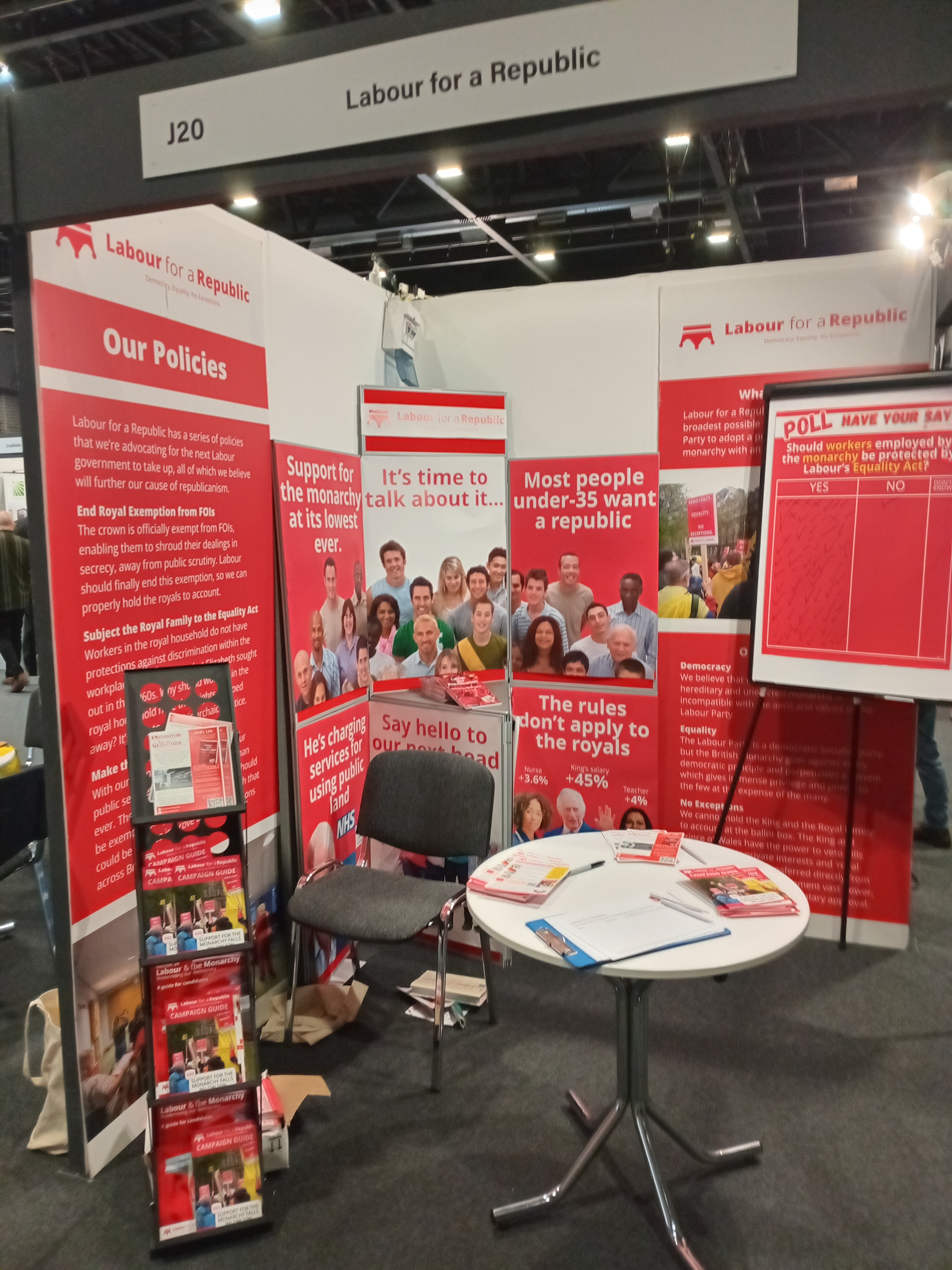
Labour for a Republic stall at Labour Party Conference 2025

== Context ==
=== Definition ===
In Great Britain, republican sentiment has largely focused on the abolition of the British monarchy, rather than the dissolution of the British Union or independence for its constituent countries. In Northern Ireland however, the term "republican" is usually used in the sense of Irish republicanism. While also opposed to monarchy, Irish republicans reject the presence of the British state in any form on the island of Ireland and advocate creating a united Ireland, an all-island state comprising the whole of Ireland. Though the opposite stance of unionism is compatible with support for a UK republic in theory, in practice it correlates strongly with monarchism.

=== Legal context ===
Advocacy of the replacement of the monarchy with a republic has long been an imprisonable offence in law. The Treason Felony Act 1848 prohibits the advocacy of a republic in print. The penalty for such advocacy, even if the republic is to be set up by peaceful means, is lifetime imprisonment. This Act remains in force in the United Kingdom. However, under the Human Rights Act 1998, the Law Lords have held that although the Treason Felony Act remains on the statute books it must be interpreted so as to be compatible with the Human Rights Act, and therefore no longer prohibits peaceful republican activity.

== History ==
Since the 1650s, early modern English republicanism has been extensively studied by historians. James Harrington (1611–1677) is generally considered to be the most representative republican writer of the era, though John Milton also wrote, among other things, a defence of the right of the people to execute an unjust ruler titled The Tenure of Kings and Magistrates.

=== Commonwealth of England ===
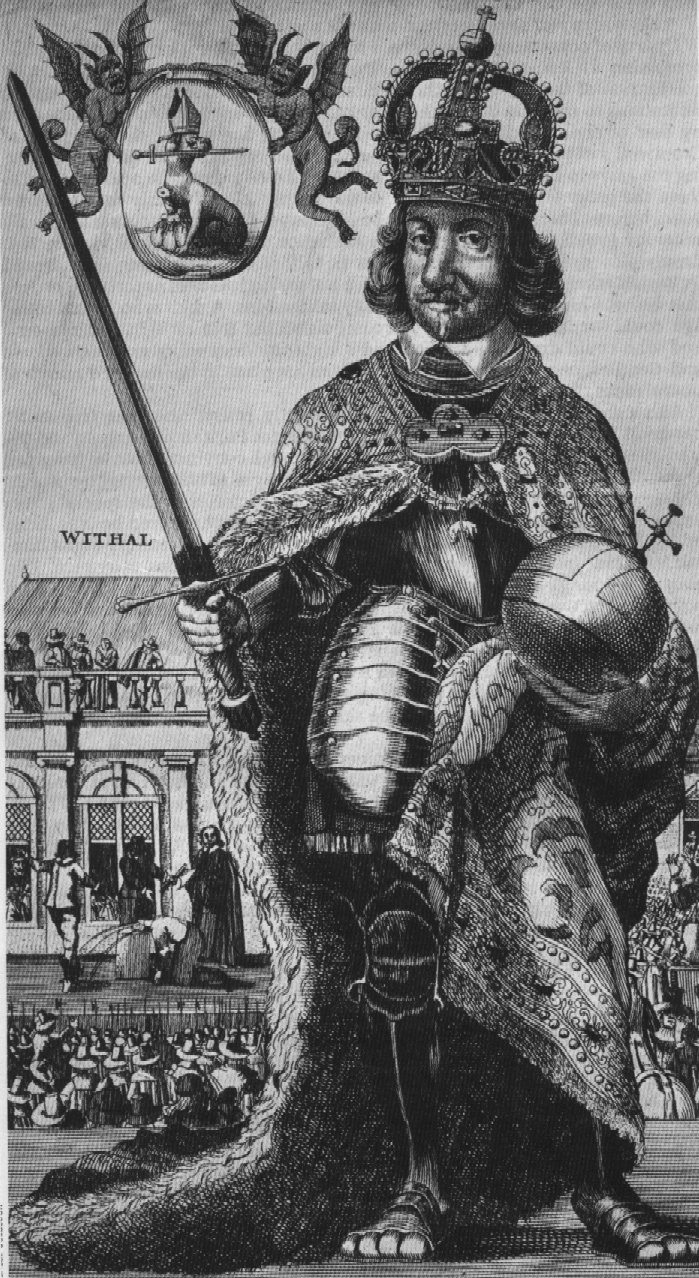
A Dutch satirical view of Cromwell as a usurper of monarchical power

The divine right of kings to rule unchallenged was established as a political theory during the reign of James I, and remained predominant until the reign of Charles I, whose poor rule and Catholic leanings called his right to rule into question. These sentiments culminated in the English Civil War, and after the king's subsequent execution in 1649, Parliament was the only source of power in the newly renamed Commonwealth of England, though the form of this power changed somewhat in the following years.

During Pride's Purge, many members of parliament who disagreed with the New Model Army were barred from the House of Commons, meaning the resulting Rump Parliament and Council of State (1649–1653) were solely made up of loyalist members. Accordingly, Oliver Cromwell did not have to contend with much opposition to his plans as Charles I did, making the chamber mostly a rubber-stamping organisation. However, not all of his executive decisions were permitted, especially in the ending of the rule of the regional major generals he appointed.

In 1657, Parliament offered Cromwell the Crown, which would mean reinstating the monarchy. After two months of deliberation, he rejected the offer and was instead ceremonially re-instated as Lord Protector of England, Scotland and Ireland (Wales was a part of England), with greater powers than he had previously held. The Protectorate was far more autocratic than the Rump Parliament and much like previous monarchical rule.

It is often suggested that offering Cromwell the crown was an effort to curb his power. As a king, he would be obliged to honour agreements such as Magna Carta, but as Lord Protector he had no such restraints. The office of Lord Protector was not formally hereditary, although Cromwell was able to nominate his own son, Richard, as his successor.

The Levellers were an egalitarian movement which had contributed greatly to Parliament's cause, but sought representation for ordinary citizens. Their point of view was strongly represented in the Putney Debates, held between the various factions of the army in 1647. Cromwell and the grandees were not prepared to permit such a radical democracy and used the debates to play for time while the future of the King was being determined.

=== Restoration of the monarchy ===
In 1660, Charles II was crowned king, ending the interregnum and restoring the monarchy. Following the Glorious Revolution of 1688 and the later coronation of George I, power shifted to the monarch's ministers and Robert Walpole. The newly joined United Kingdom became a constitutional monarchy. There have been movements throughout the last few centuries whose aims were to remove the monarchy and establish a republican system. A notable period was the time in the late 18th century and early 19th century when many Radicals such as the minister Joseph Fawcett were openly republican.

=== American and French Revolutions ===
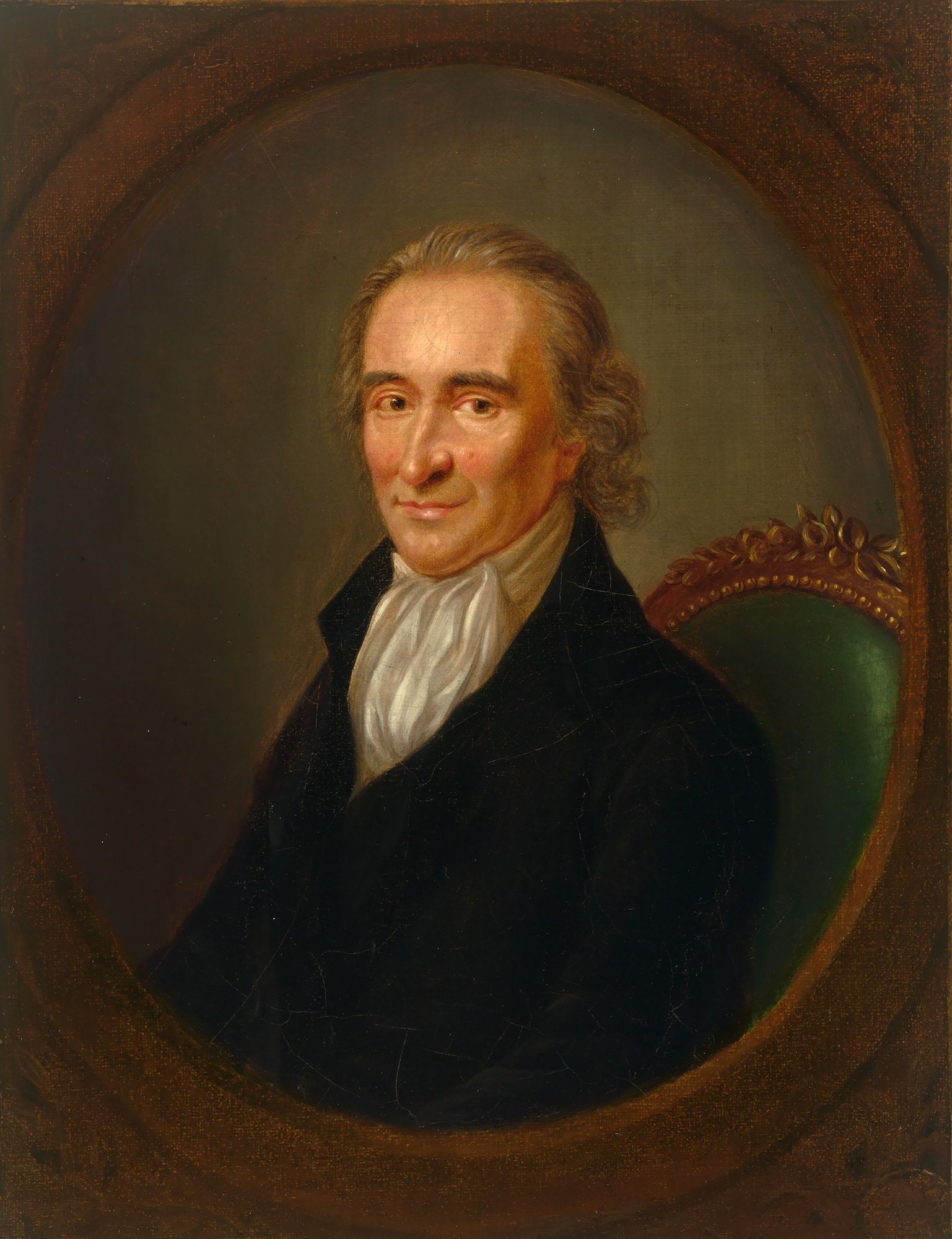
Thomas Paine (1737–1809): "One of the strongest natural proofs of the folly of hereditary right in kings is that nature disproves it, otherwise she would not so frequently turn it into ridicule, by giving mankind an ass for a lion."

The American Revolution had a great impact on political thought in Ireland and Britain. According to Christopher Hitchens, the British–American author, philosopher, politician and activist, Thomas Paine was the "moral author of the American Revolution", who posited in the soon widely read pamphlet Common Sense (January 1776) that the conflict of the Thirteen Colonies with the Hanoverian monarchy in London was best resolved by setting up a separate democratic republic. To him, republicanism was more important than independence. However, the circumstances forced the American revolutionaries to give up any hope of reconciliation with Britain, and reforming its 'corrupt' monarchial government, that so often dragged the American colonies in its European wars, from within. He and other British republican writers saw in the Declaration of Independence (4 July 1776) a legitimate struggle against the Crown, that violated people's freedom and rights, and denied them representation in politics.

When the French Revolution broke out in 1789, debates started in the British Isles on how to respond. Soon a pro-Revolutionary republican and anti-Revolutionary monarchist camp had established themselves among the intelligentsia, who waged a pamphlet war until 1795. Prominent figures of the republican camp were Mary Wollstonecraft, William Godwin and Paine.

Paine would also play an important role inside the revolution in France as an elected member of the National Convention (1792–1793), where he lobbied for an invasion of Britain to establish a republic after the example of the United States, France and its sister republics, but also opposed the execution of Louis XVI, which got him arrested. The French First Republic would indeed stage an expedition to Ireland in December 1796 to help the Society of United Irishmen set up an Irish republic to destabilise the United Kingdom, but this ended in a failure. The subsequent Irish Rebellion of 1798 was suppressed by forces of the British Crown. Napoleon also planned an invasion of Britain since 1798 and more seriously since 1803, but in 1804 he relinquished republicanism by crowning himself Emperor of the French and converting all Sister Republics into client kingdoms of the French Empire, before calling off the invasion of Britain altogether in 1805.

=== Revolutionary republicanism, 1800–1848 ===
The British republican flag, which originated in 1816, in use until at least 1935

The English Republican Tricolour proposed by Hugh Williams and described in WJ "Spartacus" Linton's 1851 poem "Our Tricolour"

From the start of the French Revolution into the early 19th century, the revolutionary blue-white-red tricolour was used throughout England, Wales and Ireland in defiance of the royal establishment. During the 1816 Spa Fields riots, a green, white and red horizontal flag appeared for the first time, soon followed by a red, white and green horizontal version allegedly in use during the 1817 Pentrich rising and the 1819 Peterloo massacre. The latter is now associated with Hungary, but then it became known as the British Republican Flag. It may have been inspired by the French revolutionary tricolour, but this is unclear. It was however often accompanied by slogans consisting of three words such as "Fraternity – Liberty – Humanity" (a clear reference to Liberté, égalité, fraternité), and adopted by the Chartist movement in the 1830s.

Besides these skirmishes in Great Britain itself, separatist republican revolutions against the British monarchy during the Canadian Rebellions of 1837–1838 and the Young Irelander Rebellion of 1848 failed.

Parliament passed the Treason Felony Act in 1848. This act made advocacy of republicanism punishable by transportation to Australia, which was later amended to life imprisonment. The law is still on the statute books; however in a 2003 case, the Law Lords stated that "It is plain as a pike staff to the respondents and everyone else that no one who advocates the peaceful abolition of the monarchy and its replacement by a republican form of government is at any risk of prosecution", for the reason that the Human Rights Act 1998 would require the 1848 Act to be interpreted in such a way as to render such conduct non-criminal.

=== Late 19th century ===
During the later years of Queen Victoria's reign, there was considerable criticism of her decision to withdraw from public life following the death of her husband, Prince Albert. This resulted in a "significant incarnation" of republicanism. During the 1870s, calls for Britain to become a republic on the American or French model were made by the politicians Charles Dilke and Charles Bradlaugh, as well as journalist George W. M. Reynolds. This was also an era in which British republicans supported Irish republicans and in which the Irish Home Rule movement had advocates in England and Scotland within the context of loyal opposition. The British republican presence continued in debates and the Labour press, especially in the event of royal weddings, jubilees and births, until well into the Interwar period.

Some prominent members of the nascent labour movement, such as Independent Labour Party leader Keir Hardie (1856–1915), also held republican views.

=== 20th-century republicanism ===
In 1923, at the annual Labour Party Conference, two motions were proposed, supported by Ernest Thurtle and Emrys Hughes. The first was "that the Royal Family is no longer a necessary party of the British constitution", and the second was "that the hereditary principle in the British Constitution be abolished". George Lansbury responded that, although he too was a republican, he regarded the issue of the monarchy as a "distraction" from more important issues. Lansbury added that he believed the "social revolution" would eventually remove the monarchy peacefully in the future. Both of the motions were overwhelmingly defeated. Following this event, most of the Labour Party moved away from advocating republican views.

Following the abdication of Edward VIII in 1936, MP James Maxton proposed a "republican amendment" to the Abdication Bill, which would have established a Republic in Britain. Maxton argued that while the monarchy had benefited Britain in the past, it had now "outlived its usefulness". Five MPs voted to support the bill, including Alfred Salter. However, the bill was defeated by 403 votes. It was not until 1937 that the first British polling company was established, but questions about retaining the monarchy do not appear to have been asked by any such organisation until some years later.

The monarchy's survival has been, and will be, ultimately dependent on the public's respect and belief that there is a value in its existence. In fact, the public seem to have consistently supported it, often greatly valued and cherished it, and the monarchy has not merely survived but flourished.

Yet until a very recent period, this has amounted to no more than a generally held belief: direct measurements of opinion have been rare. Britain has had no referendum on the monarchy, nor a general election in which it was an issue between the major parties; nor, until the 1990s, did it have even semi-regular opinion polls to test whether the people wished to retain the monarchy or would prefer a republic. The reason is perhaps understandable: the broad majority of support was so obvious that there was felt to be little value in measuring it. The opposing minority perhaps saw nothing to be gained by testing their strength. But the result is a frustrating paucity of solid evidence about what ordinary Britons thought about the institution and the royal family until a comparatively recent date.

— Roger Mortimore, "Measuring British Public Opinion on the Monarchy and the Royal Family" in The Windsor Dynasty 1910 to the Present

As noted by Roger Mortimore, "the oldest continuing trend series on the straight-choice, monarchy-or-republic, question began only in 1993." He adds, "it seems not to have been until 1966 that any client took the plunge by commissioning a poll directly measuring support for the monarchy." According to Mortimore, this "was commissioned for a Panorama programme to mark Prince Charles's eighteenth birthday, and the poll found that 'about a sixth of the British people think they would like to see the monarchy abolished'. Three Gallup polls in the early and mid-1970s showed support for the status quo significantly higher than this, although they may have tilted the balance in the monarchy's favour by stating the alternative as 'a President, as they have in America and some European countries' at a period when the public standing of the American presidency in Britain cannot have been at its highest."

Willie Hamilton, a republican Scottish Labour MP who served from 1950 to 1987, was known for his outspoken anti-royal views. He discussed these at length in his 1975 book My Queen and I. However, all available evidence suggests that his view remained one shared by a small minority of Britons for most of his time in Parliament. In Crown and People (1978), royal historian Philip Ziegler summarised public opinion on the monarchy in the quarter-century between Elizabeth II's accession to the throne and her Silver Jubilee in 1977: "In the years after 1953 Britain entered the age of the psephologist. More and more often allegedly representative cross-sections of the British people found themselves interrogated about their views on abortion, religion, washing-machines, national politics or pornographic films." He notes that on thirteen occasions between 1953 and 1976, via varying questions, the public were asked whether they would prefer Britain to continue with a monarchical form of government or for the country to become a republic. Ziegler lists the proportions favouring a republic as 9% in 1953; 10% in 1956 (in a Mass Observation Survey); 14% in 1958 (Mass Observation Survey); 10% in 1960 (Mass Observation Survey); 16% in 1964 (Mass Observation Survey); 10% in July 1969 (National Opinion Polls); 16% in October 1969 (NOP); 10% in October 1970; 19% in June 1971 (NOP); 12% in January 1972 (Gallup); 11% in May 1973 (Gallup); 8% in February 1976 (Gallup); 10% in May 1976 (Gallup). The television film Royal Family was first shown in 1969 and watched by a large audience, which may account for the increased interest in the period following its broadcast.

Various questions have been asked by opinion polling companies: in the July 1969 survey by NOP, respondents were asked "In your opinion is the Monarchy a good thing or a bad thing for Britain?" 88% approved, with only 5% disapproving. In October that year, the question NOP asked was "Do you think that Britain needs the Queen or not?" 84% answered "Yes", and 16% said "No". Over one in five of those aged 34 and under felt that Britain did not need the Queen (Elizabeth II). The same question was asked by NOP in June 1971. In May 1986, NOP stated that "Nine out of ten people think the monarchy should continue in Britain and only 7% believe it should be abolished."

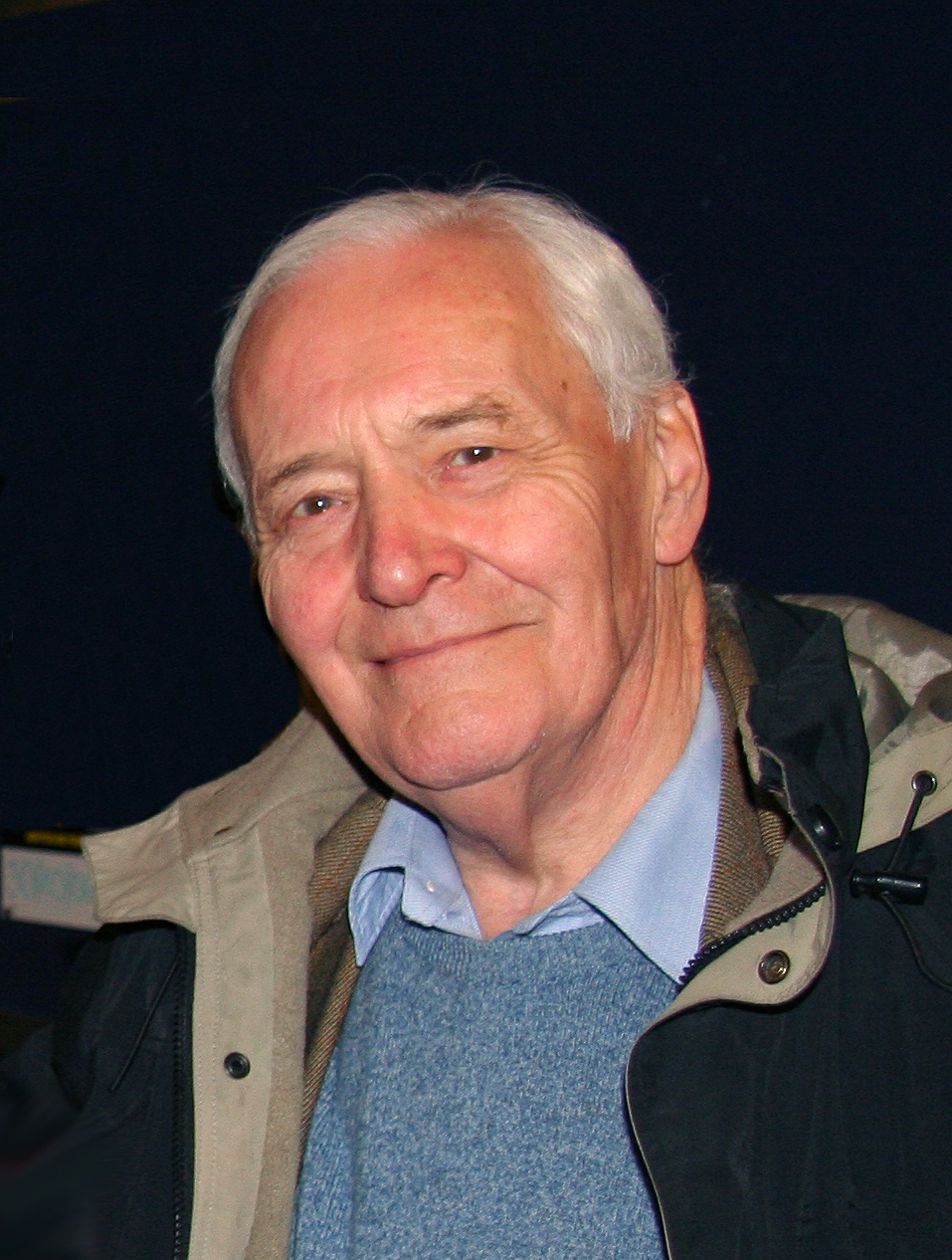
Tony Benn in 2007

The pressure group Republic, which campaigns for a republic in the United Kingdom, was formed in 1983. In 1991, Labour MP Tony Benn introduced the Commonwealth of Britain Bill, which called for the transformation of the United Kingdom into a "democratic, federal and secular Commonwealth of Britain", with an elected president. The monarchy would be abolished and replaced by a republic with a written constitution. It was read in Parliament a number of times until his retirement at the 2001 election, but never achieved a second reading. Benn presented an account of his proposal in Common Sense: A New Constitution for Britain.

In January 1997, ITV broadcast a live television debate Monarchy: The Nation Decides, in which 2.5 million viewers voted on the question "Do you want a monarch?" by telephone. Speaking for the republican view were Professor Stephen Haseler, (chairman of Republic), agony aunt Claire Rayner, Paul Flynn, Labour MP for Newport West and Andrew Neil, then the former editor of The Sunday Times. Those in favour of the monarchy included author Frederick Forsyth, Bernie Grant, Labour MP for Tottenham, and Jeffrey Archer, former deputy chairman of the Conservative Party. Conservative MP Steven Norris was scheduled to appear in a discussion towards the end of the programme, but officials from Carlton Television said he had left without explanation. The debate was conducted in front of an audience of 3,000 at the National Exhibition Centre in Birmingham, with the telephone poll result being that 66% of voters wanted a monarch, and 34% did not.

At the annual State Opening of Parliament, MPs are summoned to the House of Lords for the Queen's Speech. From the 1990s until the 2010s, republican MP Dennis Skinner regularly made a retort to Black Rod, the official who commands the House of Commons to attend the speech. Skinner had previously remained in the Commons for the speech.

=== 21st-century republicanism ===
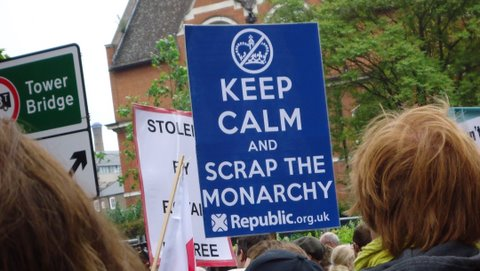
Protest for republicanism and against the monarchy in London in 2012

MORI polls in the opening years of the 21st century showed that over 70% of the public supported retaining the monarchy, but in 2005, at the time of the wedding of Prince Charles and Camilla Parker Bowles, support for the monarchy dipped, with one poll showing that 65% of people would support keeping the monarchy if there were a referendum on the issue, and 22% saying they favoured a republic. In a 2006 feature marking the Queen's 80th birthday, Time magazine quoted MORI founder Robert Worcester on this issue, who called it "the most stable measure in British polling".

In 2009, an ICM poll, commissioned by the BBC, found that 76% of those asked wanted the monarchy to continue after the reign of the Queen, while 18% of people said they would favour Britain becoming a republic, and 6% said they did not know.

Support for the monarchy appeared to strengthen in the early to mid-2010s, when the Queen celebrated her Diamond Jubilee, and her grandson, who was second in line to the throne, got married in a ceremony broadcast on live television; both events were marked by public bank holidays. Most polls during this period suggesting that between 75% and 80% (and all suggesting at least 69%) of the public were in favour of the monarchy. In February 2011, a YouGov poll put support for ending the monarchy after the Queen's death at 13%, if Prince Charles became king.

However, an ICM poll shortly before the wedding of Prince William and Kate Middleton on 29 April 2011 suggested that 26% thought Britain would be better off without the monarchy, with only 37% "genuinely interested and excited" by the wedding. The same month, an Ipsos MORI poll of 1,000 British adults found that 75% of the public would like Britain to remain a monarchy, with 18% in favour of Britain becoming a republic.

In May 2012, in the lead up to the Queen's Diamond Jubilee, an Ipsos MORI poll of 1,006 British adults found that 80% were in favour of the monarchy, with 13% in favour of the United Kingdom becoming a republic. This was thought to be a record-high figure in recent years in favour of the monarchy.

Jeremy Corbyn, a Labour MP with republican views, won his party's leadership election in September 2015, thus becoming Leader of the Opposition and Leader of the Labour Party. In 1991, Corbyn had seconded the Commonwealth of Britain Bill. However, Corbyn stated during his 2015 campaign for the leadership that republicanism was "not a battle that I am fighting".

At the swearing of oaths in the Commons following the 2017 general election, Republic reported that several MPs had prefixed their parliamentary oath of allegiance with broadly republican sentiments, such as a statement referring to their constituents, rather than the Queen. If an MP does not take the oath or the affirmation to the monarch, they will not be able to take part in parliamentary proceedings or paid any salary and allowances until they have done so. Such MPs included Richard Burgon, Laura Pidcock, Dennis Skinner, Chris Williamson, Paul Flynn, Jeff Smith, and Emma Dent Coad. Roger Godsiff and Alex Sobel also expressed sympathy for an oath to their constituents.

The level of support for the monarchy has declined since the 2010s. As of 2024, the last published poll in which over 70% favoured the monarchy was in 2019. The proportion favouring a republic has slightly increased at the same time, but has consistently remained a less popular position than maintaining the monarchy. Support for republicanism in Britain has ranged from 13% to 34% since the 1990s, with the figure generally remaining above 20% in the early 2020s. The monarchy is somewhat less popular among Black British groups, British Asians, and younger Britons (those under 35); these demographic groups are generally more in favour of a republic.

In May 2021, a YouGov poll showed reduced support for the monarchy, with 61% in favour and 24% against among all over-18s; there was a particularly high rise in republican views and an overall plurality for its replacement with an elected head of state in the 18–24 age group (41%–31%). The poll also suggested significant reductions in support for the monarchy in 25–49-year olds, and a slight fall in support among over 65s.

In May 2022, ahead of the Queen's Platinum Jubilee, another YouGov poll showed that only 31% of 18–24-year olds were in favour of the monarchy, compared to 66% of the population as a whole. Four months later, in the wake of the Queen's death, this figure stood firm at 67%. However, it has not reached this level since then, and two Savanta polls since King Charles III succeeded his mother have shown support for a republic at over 30%. Aside from a 2022 Byline Times poll (which did not include "Don't know" as an option), these are the first opinion poll results to give figures of over 30% in favour of a republic. Since the beginning of his reign the King has been dubbed "Charles the Last" by several commentators in the context of the ongoing debate about whether the monarchy should continue.

In April 2023, YouGov polling found that 58% overall saying they support keeping the monarchy. However, less than one third of 18 to 24-year-olds were in favour of the monarchy, compared to 78% of over-65s. The anti-monarchy campaign group Republic reported a doubling of its membership since the Coronation of King Charles III that May, whilst its income had substantially increased. Commenting in November that year, chief executive Graham Smith said, "In 2020, our income was £106,000. It was £172,000 the next year; last year it was £286,000. On the death of the queen, we had £70,000 in donations that month. This year, income is hitting £560,000." Support for British the monarchy has for decades been lower among younger people, while older people are more likely to feel that the monarchy is important.

In a January 2024 poll of 2,281 UK adults aged 18+ conducted by Savanta, on behalf of the pro-republican campaign group Republic, support for the monarchy stood at 48%; respondents were asked "What would you prefer for the UK, a monarchy or an elected head of state?". This was the first time the figure preferring a monarchy had been below 50% since published opinion polling on the topic had begun. However, according to a poll conducted by Yougov in January 2026, 64% of the public believe Britain should continue to have a monarchy.

=== Protests ===
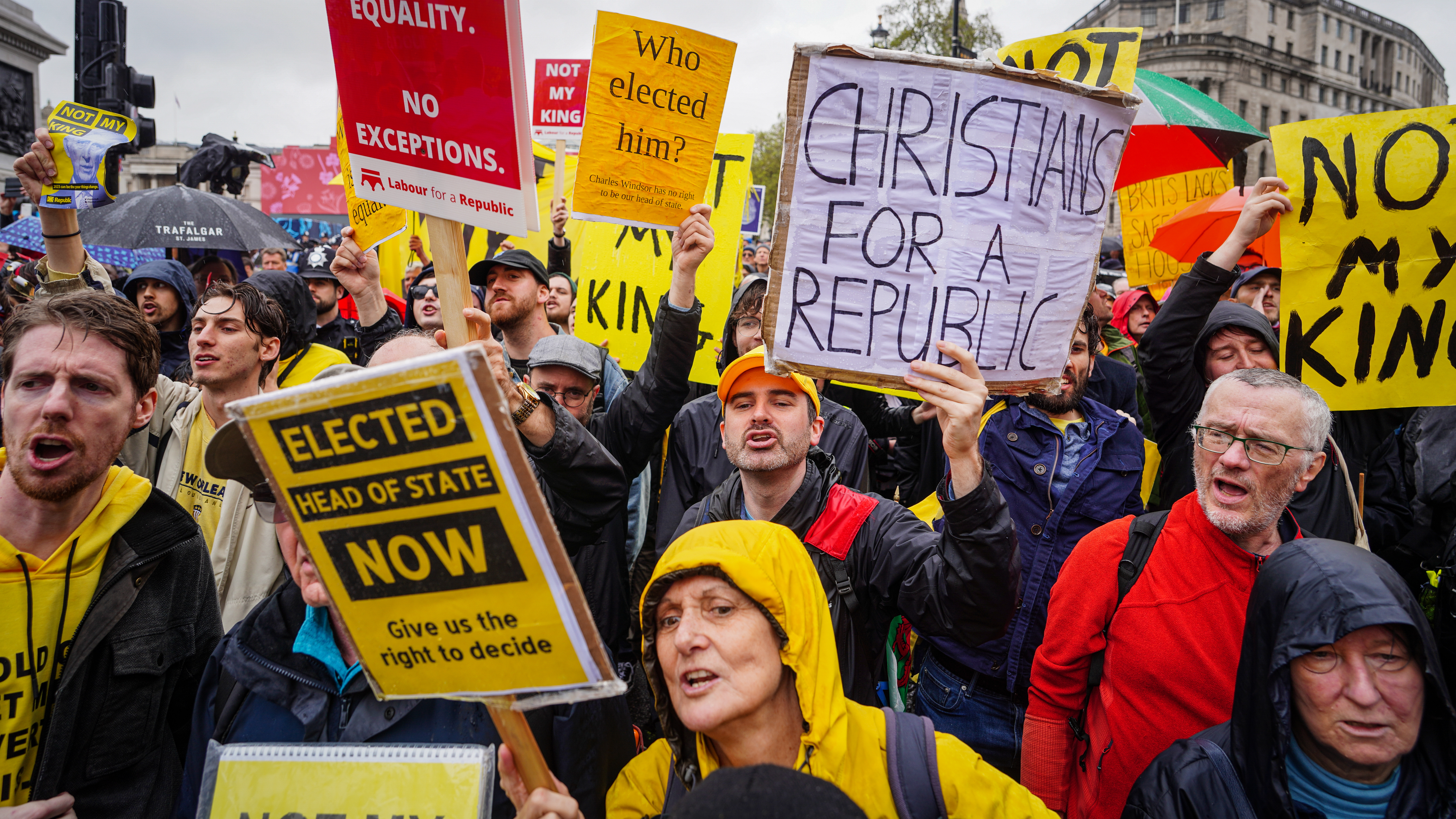
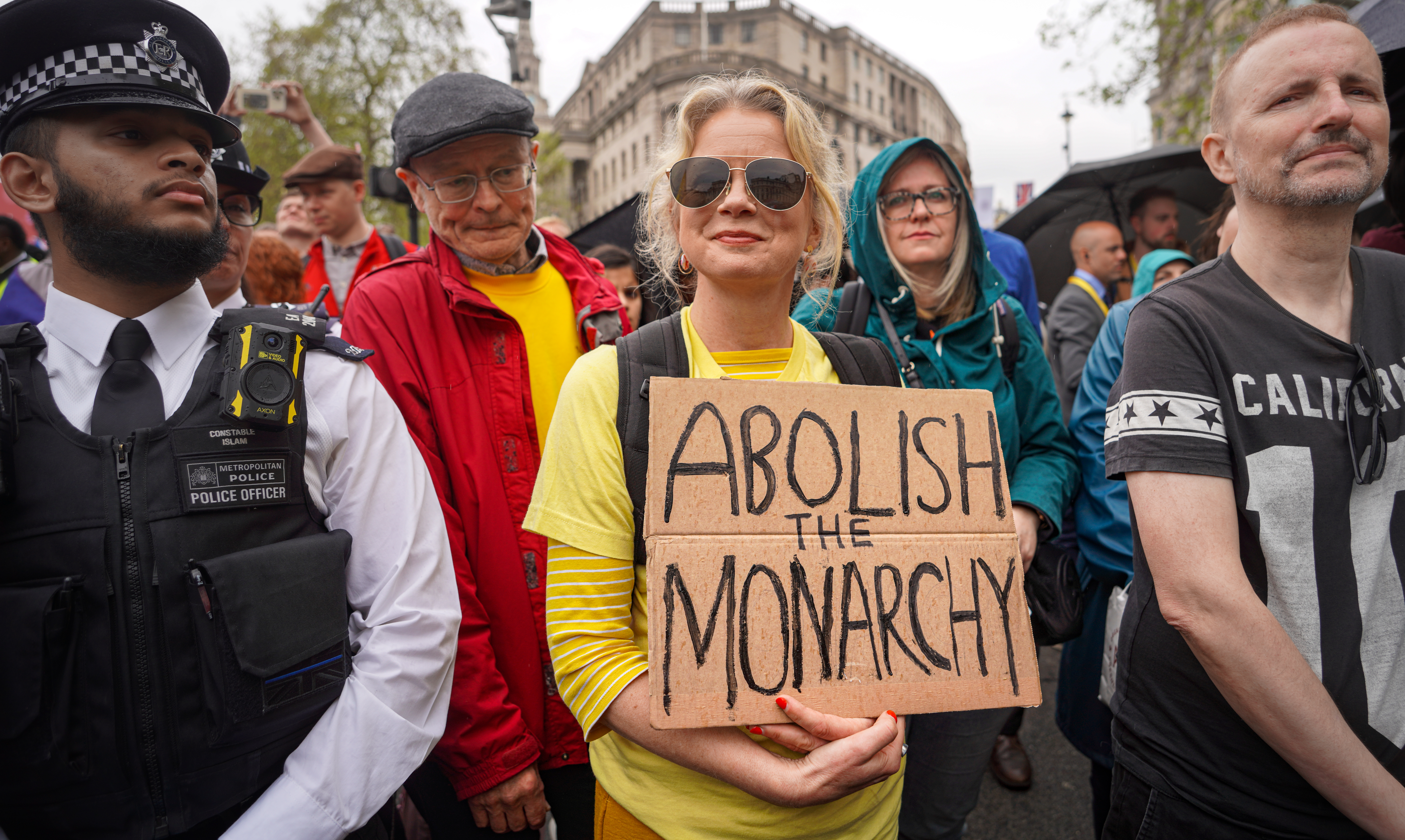
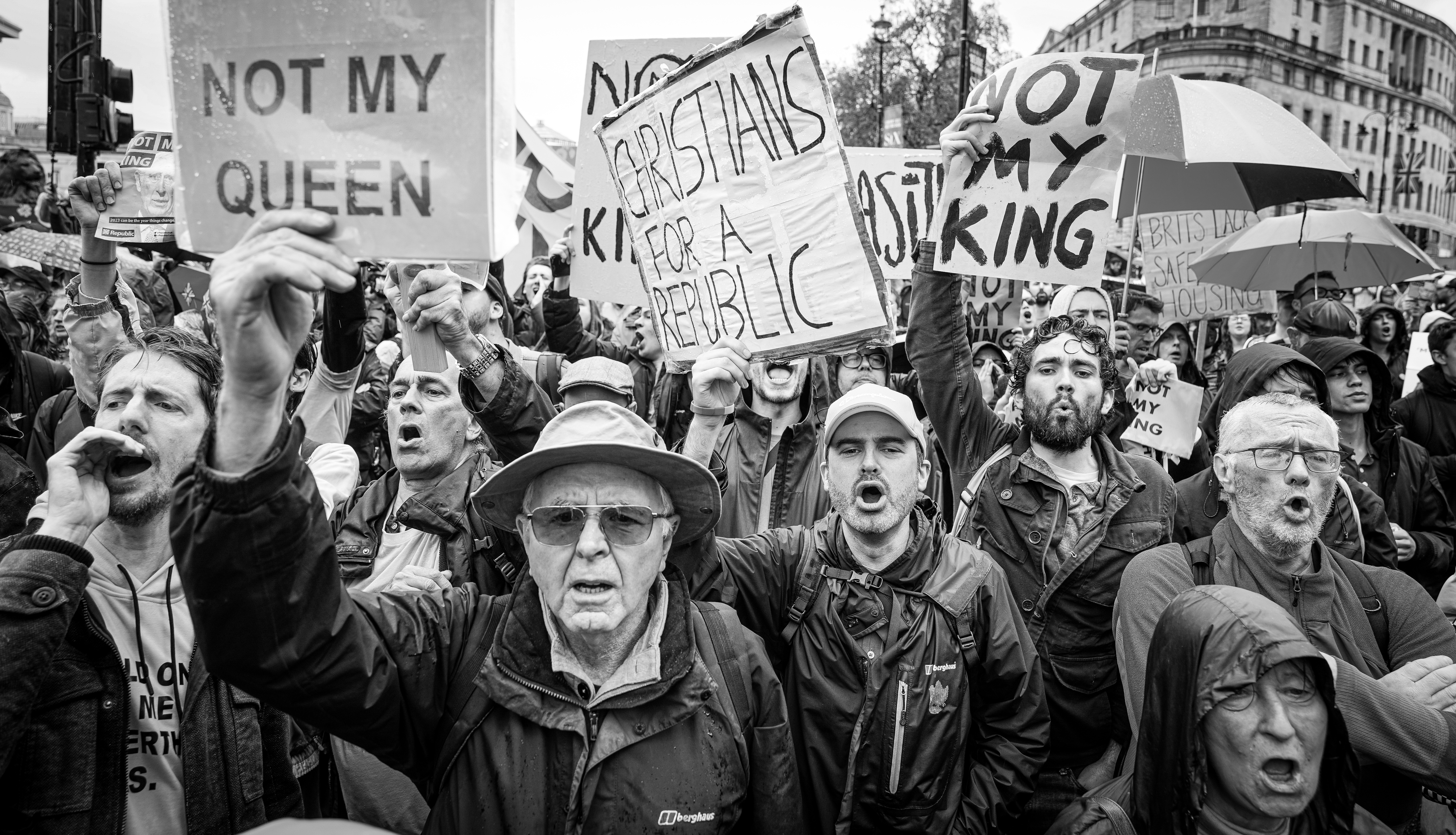
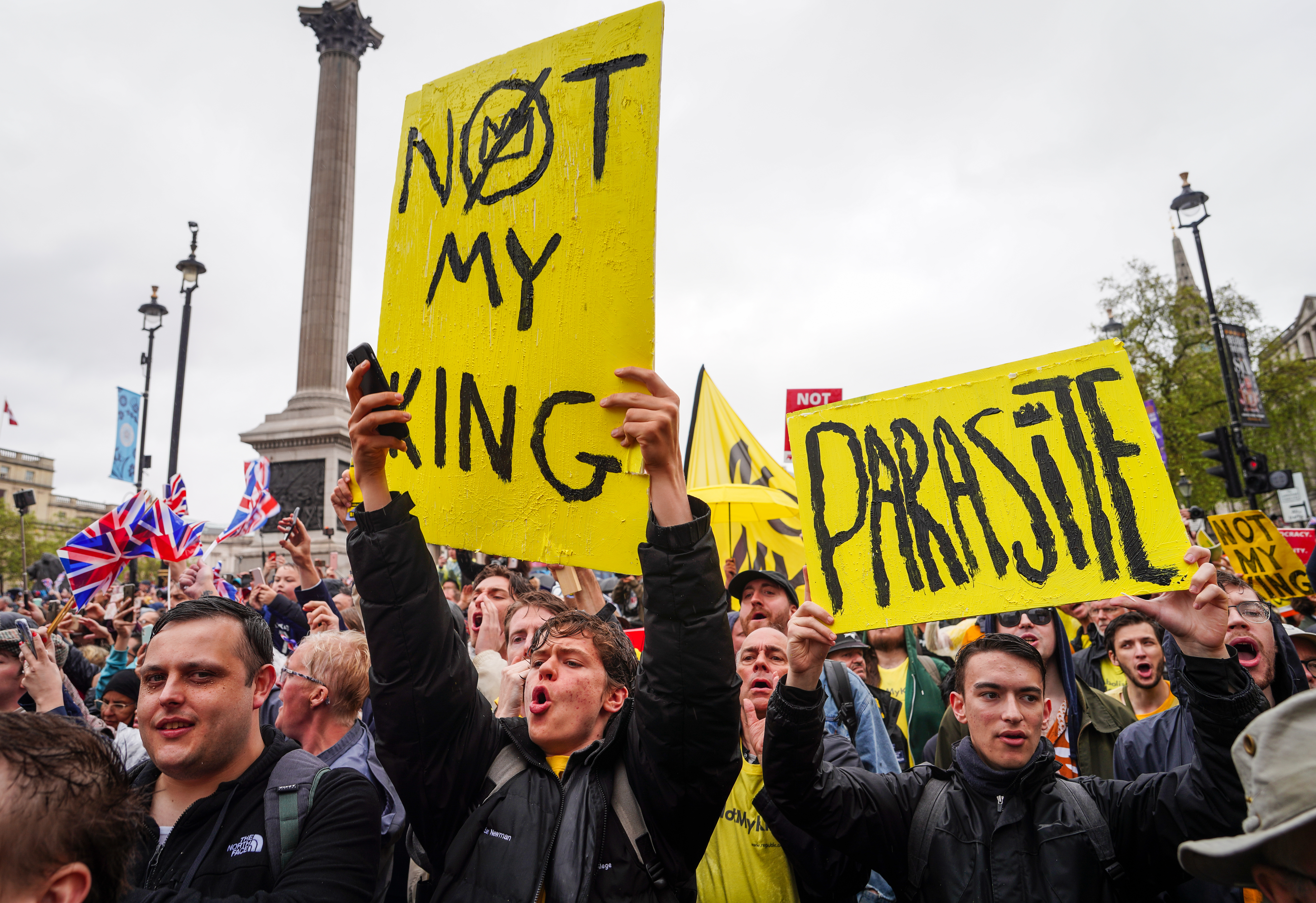
Demonstrations and protests against the coronation of Charles III and Camilla in 2023

Protests against King Charles III have included blank pieces of paper, heckling during royal processions involving Andrew Mountbatten-Windsor, and egging attempts.

A major protest was planned by Republic for the Coronation of King Charles III in May 2023. However, on the day of the event, Republic CEO Graham Smith and five others were arrested by police. They were held for over 15 hours, before being released. The Metropolitan Police later confirmed that no further action would be taken and issued apologies to the protestors, though Smith did not accept his and demanded a full public inquiry. The arrests were made in spite of months of previous discussion about the protests between Republic and the police. Human Rights Watch UK director Yasmine Ahmed said, "This is something you would expect to see in Moscow, not London." Hundreds of protesters assembled in central London that day; it was also reported that 300 people had gathered in Cardiff to protest.

A subsequent ceremony in Edinburgh marking the coronation was targeted by republican protesters, led by Patrick Harvie, the co-leader of Scottish Greens and a Scottish Government minister. Chants of "not my king" could be heard inside the venue for the event, which took place in July 2023.

In September 2023, republican activists staged what was called the "first-ever" protest inside Buckingham Palace. In a photo released by Republic, protestors wore T-shirts spelling out "Not My King." In a statement, Republic said "The protest is the latest in a series of actions aimed at pushing forward the debate about the future of the monarchy". They said that six of the activists had been briefly detained by security, before being escorted out of the front gate.

The State Opening of Parliament in November 2023, the first by a king in over 70 years, was also met with protests by republicans, who booed King Charles as he arrived. It was later reported that Charles had waved to them from his carriage.

== Supporters ==
A number of prominent individuals in the United Kingdom advocate republicanism.

=== Political parties ===
The Irish republican party Sinn Féin has seven MPs, but they do not take their UK parliamentary seats as a rejection of UK authority in Northern Ireland. Though the official policy of the Scottish National Party (SNP) is that the British monarch would remain head of state of an independent Scotland unless the people of Scotland decided otherwise, there are individual members who support a republic. Plaid Cymru have a similar view for Wales, although its youth wing, Plaid Ifanc, has an official policy advocating a Welsh republic. The Scottish Socialist Party and the Scottish Greens both support an independent Scottish republic.

The Labour Party, the Conservative Party, and the Liberal Democrats do not have an official policy of republicanism.

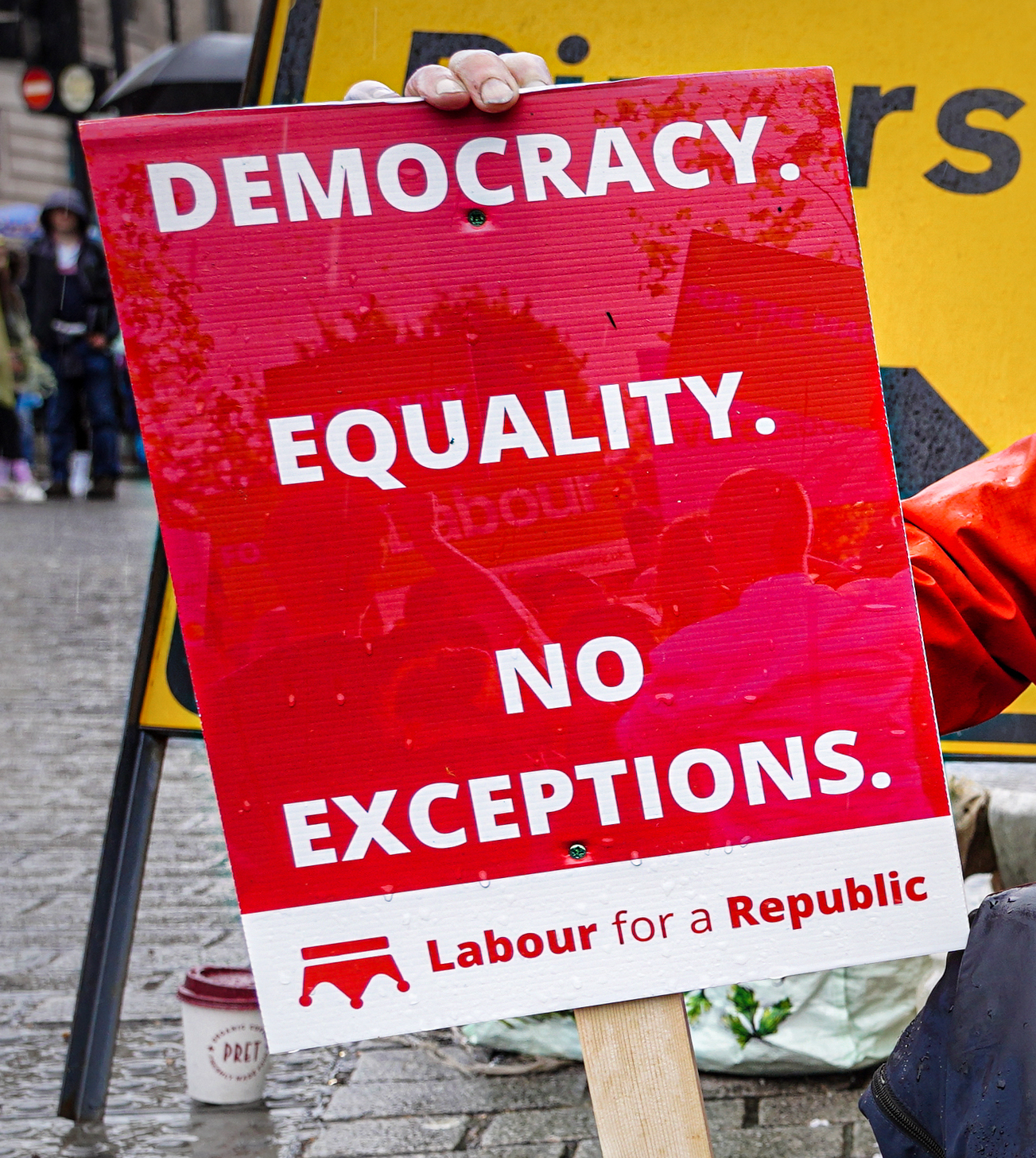
A Labour for a Republic sign at a demonstration against the coronation of Charles III and Camilla on 6 May 2023

Labour for a Republic is a republican pressure group of Labour Party members and supporters, founded by Labour activist Ken Ritchie in May 2011. It held its first meeting in 2012. It has since held meetings, other informal meetings, and appeared in the media on a few occasions. As of September 2022, its chairman is Nick Wall. The organisation held an event at the Labour Party's annual conference on 25 September 2022, which attracted large crowds, and included The Guardian's columnist Polly Toynbee, author Paul Richards, and expert in constitutional law Dr Adam Tucker as panellists.

In response to the Labour Party's decision to sing "God Save the King" at the conference, panellists and those who attended the event said they did not want to see it booed or heckled. It was reported that the singing was not disrupted, and that the minute of silence for the recent death of Elizabeth II was observed without failure. In 2023, the Labour Party added pro-republic campaign group Republic to a list of organisations which local party branches were no longer able to affiliate with.

It is rare for a high-profile British politician to identify with republicanism, even among those who campaigned for a republic earlier in their careers. Former UK prime minister Liz Truss was an advocate of republicanism prior to becoming a Conservative MP. Labour Party leader Sir Keir Starmer was, at an earlier time in his career, also on record as a republican, but no longer identifies as one. His predecessor as Labour leader, Jeremy Corbyn, although an avowed republican, also stressed that his personal support for republicanism would not influence his policy agenda. The former First Minister of Scotland and leader of the Scottish National Party from March 2023 to May 2024, Humza Yousaf, is a republican.

=== Republic ===
The largest lobby group in favour of republicanism in the United Kingdom is the Republic campaign group, founded in 1983. The group has benefited from occasional negative publicity about the Royal Family, and Republic reported a large rise in membership following the wedding of then-Prince Charles and Camilla Parker-Bowles. Republic has lobbied on changes to the parliamentary oath of allegiance, royal finances and changes to the Freedom of Information Act relating to the monarchy, none of which have produced any change. However, Republic has been invited to Parliament to talk as witnesses on certain issues related to the monarchy, such as conduct of the honours system in the United Kingdom.

In 2009, Republic made news by reporting Prince Charles's architecture charity to the Charity Commission, claiming that the Prince was effectively using the organisation as a private lobbying firm (the Commission declined to take the matter further). Republic has previously broken stories about royals using the Freedom of Information Act.

=== Media ===
Newspapers and magazines such as The Guardian, The Observer, The Economist and The Independent have all advocated the abolition of the monarchy. In the wake of the 2009 MPs' expenses scandal, a poll of readers of The Guardian and The Observer placed support for abolition of the monarchy at 54%, although only 3% saw it as a top priority. The online magazine Spiked also supports republicanism.

== Opinion polling ==
=== British Social Attitudes survey ===
The National Centre for Social Research (NatCen) has collected survey data on public attitudes towards the UK's Monarchy since 1983, when the British Social Attitudes Survey first asked about this, with the question "How important or unimportant do you think it is for Britain to continue to have a monarchy: very important, quite important, not very important, not at all important, or, do you think the monarchy should be abolished?" Results for the latter answer between 1983 and 2012 ranged from 3% to 11%.

Since then, the results suggest a long-term decline in support for the institution, with 2023 survey data showing the number of people who said the monarchy was "very important" falling to 29%, an all-time low. 26% said it was "quite important", making a combined total of 55% believing it was important. This total stood at 54% in the data released a year later, in April 2024. Gillian Prior, deputy chief executive at the National Centre for Social Research, said: "NatCen has been collecting data on the public's attitudes towards the monarchy for over 40 years, and it is clear we are observing a downward trend in support for the monarchy."

=== Graphical summary ===
The chart below shows opinion polls conducted about whether the United Kingdom should become a republic. The trend lines are local regressions (LOESS).

=== Poll results ===
The following table includes all known published polls in which the general public in the UK or Great Britain are asked for their preference on the future of the monarchy. Generally, the question revolves around whether they support the continuation of the monarchy or its abolition (regardless of a republic being specified). The question has been framed in different ways: some polling companies have asked whether respondents prefer a monarchy or an elected head of state.

Dates conducted	Pollster	Client	Sample size	Monarchy	Republic	Undecided (Note: Including don't know, would not vote, refused to answer)	Lead
25–28 Sep 2026	Deltapoll	N/A	1,983	62%	23%	16%	39%
3–6 Jul 2026	Survation	N/A	2,025	56%	27%	16%	29%
13-14 Apr 2026	Yougov	N/A	2,129	64%	24%	12%	40%
5-11 March 2026	Ipsos	N/A	1,062	55%	27% (Note: Question asked whether respondents prefer a monarchy or an elected head of state for the UK.)	18%	28%
6–9 Feb 2026	Savanta	Republic	2,132	45%	32%	24%	13%
8–9 Jan 2026	YouGov	N/A	2,103	64%	23%	14%	41%
26–27 Oct 2025	YouGov	N/A	2,161	62%	25%	14%	37%
23 Oct 2025	Savanta	Republic	1,057	48%	32%	18%	16%
5–6 Aug 2025	YouGov	N/A	2,292	65%	23%	12%	42%
14–15 Aug 2024	YouGov	N/A	2,021	65%	25%	10%	40%
26–29 Apr 2024	Ipsos	The Mail on Sunday	2,166	60%	28%	8%	32%
1–4 Mar 2024	Savanta	Republic	2,256	53%	33%	13%	20%
15–16 Jan 2024	YouGov	Republic	2,089	45%	31%	24%	14%
5–8 Jan 2024	Savanta	Republic	2,281	48%	32%	20%	16%
24–26 Nov 2023	Savanta	Republic	2,283	60%	29%	12%	31%
24–26 Nov 2023	Savanta	Republic	2,283	52%	34%	13%	18%
6–12 Sep 2023	Ipsos	N/A	1,006	66%	25%	9%	41%
26–28 Aug 2023	YouGov	N/A	2,020	62%	26%	11%	36%
10–16 May 2023	Ipsos	N/A	1,006	62%	28%	10%	34%
10–12 May 2023	Opinium	The Observer	2,050	60%	25%	15%	35%
6–8 May 2023	Coronation of King Charles III and Queen Camilla and bank holiday weekend						
3–4 May 2023	BMG	i (British newspaper)	1,534	52%	23%	25%	29%
28 Apr – 2 May 2023	Savanta	Republic	2,274	57%	30%	13%	27%
28–30 Apr 2023	Savanta	Yahoo News	2,274	57%	29%	14%	28%
26–27 Apr 2023	YouGov	The Times	2,111	60%	26%	15%	34%
25–26 Apr 2023	YouGov	N/A	2,030	62%	25%	12%	37%
24–25 Apr 2023	Find Out Now	Electoral Calculus	2,211	54%	20%	26%	34%
21–23 Apr 2023	Savanta	ITV News	2,181	53%	19%	28%	34%
14–17 Apr 2023	YouGov	Panorama (BBC)	4,592	58%	26%	16%	32%
22–29 Mar 2023	Ipsos	N/A	1,004	65%	25%	10%	40%
6 Feb – 23 Mar 2023	Lord Ashcroft Polls	N/A	10,294 (Note: The survey also allowed respondents to choose "I would not vote"; 9% of the base selected this option, and 13% chose "Don't know".)	56%	23%	22%	33%
18–20 Mar 2023	YouGov	N/A	1,983	61%	24%	15%	37%
25 Jan – 15 Feb 2023	Find Out Now / Electoral Calculus	Property Chronicle	1,030	55% (Note: Respondents were asked whether they agreed or disagreed with the statements "Do you agree or disagree that the British Monarchy should be abolished?" and "Do you agree or disagree that the British Monarchy should be kept?"; the results of the two questions were then averaged.)	23%	22%	32%
18–25 Jan 2023	Ipsos	N/A	1,001	64%	22%	13%	42%
12–16 Jan 2023	Deltapoll	N/A	1,059	63%	23%	14%	40%
10–11 Jan 2023	YouGov	N/A	1,691	64%	23%	13%	41%
5–6 Jan 2023	Savanta	Sunday Express	2,124	55%	33%	13%	22%
14–15 Dec 2022	YouGov	Republic	1,690	60%	25%	15%	35%
9–11 Dec 2022	Savanta	N/A	2,250	55%	31%	14%	24%
21–22 Sep 2022	JL Partners	The Sun on Sunday	2,010	66%	25%	9%	41%
13–14 Sep 2022	YouGov	N/A	1,710	67%	20%	13%	47%
13 Sep 2022	People Polling	GB News	1,245	63%	19%	19%	44%
11–12 Sep 2022	YouGov	The Times	1,727	64%	21%	15%	43%
8 Sep 2022	Charles III accedes to the throne following the death of his mother						
14–15 Jun 2022	YouGov	Republic	1,678	61%	24%	15%	37%
2–5 Jun 2022	Bank holiday weekend celebrating the Platinum Jubilee of Elizabeth II						
30–31 May 2022	Omnisis	Byline Times	1,026	66%	34%	–	32%
27–29 May 2022	Savanta ComRes	N/A	2,177	57%	29%	14%	28%
27 May 2022	Ipsos	N/A	1,013	68%	22%	10%	46%
16–17 May 2022	YouGov	N/A	1,669	62%	22%	16%	40%
30 Apr – 2 May 2022	YouGov	N/A	1,754	60%	27%	13%	33%
29–30 Mar 2022	YouGov	N/A	?	59%	24%	17%	35%
28 Feb – 7 Mar 2022	Focaldata	British Future	2,006	58%	25%	17%	33%
16–17 Feb 2022	YouGov	N/A	?	61%	24%	15%	37%
19–24 Nov 2021	Ipsos MORI	N/A	1,005	60%	21%	19%	39%
29 Jul 2021	Redfield & Wilton Strategies	New Statesman	1,500	53%	18%	23%	35%
6–7 May 2021	YouGov	N/A	?	62%	23%	15%	39%
21–22 Apr 2021	YouGov	The Times	1,730	63%	20%	16%	43%
9 Apr 2021	Death of Prince Philip, Duke of Edinburgh						
19–30 Mar 2021	Find Out Now	Electoral Calculus	2,500	56%	20%	24%	36%
15–16 Mar 2021	YouGov	N/A	?	61%	24%	15%	37%
12–15 Mar 2021	YouGov	N/A	?	61%	25%	14%	36%
11–12 Mar 2021	Opinium	The Observer	2,001	55%	29%	17%	26%
11–12 Mar 2021	YouGov	N/A	?	62%	22%	15%	40%
9–10 Mar 2021	Survation	Sunday Mirror	958	55%	29%	16%	26%
9 Mar 2021	JL Partners	Daily Mail	1,056	50%	29%	21%	21%
8–9 Mar 2021	YouGov	N/A	1,672	63%	25%	12%	38%
8 Mar 2021	UK broadcast of television interview programme Oprah with Meghan and Harry						
2–4 Oct 2020	YouGov	N/A	1,626	67%	21%	12%	46%
5–6 Mar 2020	YouGov	N/A	?	63%	23%	14%	40%
18 Feb 2020	YouGov	N/A	3,142	62%	22%	16%	40%
9–11 Jan 2020	Deltapoll	The Mail on Sunday	1,055	59%	20%	21%	39%
21–22 Nov 2019	YouGov	The Sunday Times	1,677	63%	19%	17%	44%
19–20 Nov 2019	YouGov	N/A	?	63%	22%	15%	41%
2–3 Oct 2019	YouGov	N/A	?	70%	18%	13%	52%
24–25 Apr 2019	YouGov	N/A	?	64%	21%	15%	43%
19 May 2018	Wedding of Prince Harry and Meghan Markle						
8–9 May 2018	YouGov	N/A	?	66%	18%	16%	48%
13–16 Feb 2016	Ipsos MORI	King's College London	1,000	76%	17%	7%	59%
3–4 Sep 2015	YouGov	N/A	1,579	71%	18%	11%	53%
8–9 Apr 2015	ComRes	Daily Mail	2,020	70%	19%	11%	51%
25–26 Jul 2013	YouGov	N/A	?	75%	17%	8%	58%
13–15 Jul 2013	Ipsos MORI	N/A	1,000	77%	17%	6%	60%
10–13 Nov 2012	Ipsos MORI	King's College London	1,014	79%	16%	5%	63%
9–11 Jun 2012	Ipsos MORI	N/A	1,016	77%	15%	8%	62%
7–8 Jun 2012	YouGov	The Sunday Times	1,667	75%	15%	10%	60%
2–5 Jun 2012	Bank holiday weekend commemorating the Diamond Jubilee of Elizabeth II						
31 May – 1 Jun 2012	YouGov	N/A	?	73%	18%	9%	55%
27–28 May 2012	YouGov	N/A	1,743	73%	16%	11%	57%
25–28 May 2012	Populus	N/A	2,056	82%	18%	–	64%
17–18 May 2012	Survation	Daily Star Sunday	1,003	71%	21%	8%	50%
12–14 May 2012	Ipsos MORI	Evening Standard	1,006	80%	13%	6%	67%
15–17 May 2011	MORI	Reuters	1,000	75%	18%	7%	57%
29 Apr 2011	Wedding of Prince William and Catherine Middleton						
26–27 Apr 2011	YouGov	Cambridge University	?	69%	20%	11%	49%
15–17 Apr 2011	Ipsos MORI	Reuters	1,000	75%	18%	7%	57%
1–3 Apr 2011	Populus	N/A	1,002	77%	23%	–	54%
20–23 Aug 2010	Populus	N/A	1,037	77%	23%	–	54%
6–8 Feb 2009	ICM Research	Politics Show (BBC)	1,017	69%	24%	8%	45%
14–16 Dec 2007	Populus	Discovery Channel	1,004	76%	16%	8%	60%
20–22 Apr 2006	Ipsos MORI	The Sun	1,006	72%	18%	10%	54%
7–9 Apr 2005	MORI	The Observer/Sunday Mirror	1,004	65%	22%	13%	43%
7–11 Jan 2005	Populus	The Sun	1,503	82%	18%	–	64%
7–11 Jan 2005	Populus	The Sun	1,503	83%	17% (Note: Respondents were also asked whether they agreed or disagreed with the statement "The Royal Family should be replaced by an elected President".)	–	66%
23–25 Apr 2004	MORI	N/A	c. 1000 (Note: GB residents aged 16 and over)	71%	20%	10%	51%
1–4 Jun 2002	Golden Jubilee Weekend to mark the Golden Jubilee of Elizabeth II						
24–26 May 2002	MORI	Tonight with Trevor McDonald	1,002	74%	19%	7%	55%
1–3 Feb 2002	MORI	N/A	?	71%	19%	10%	52%
14–16 Dec 2001	MORI	N/A	1,000	70%	21%	9%	49%
10–12 Apr 2001	MORI	Daily Mail	1,003	70%	19%	11%	51%
5–6 Apr 2001	MORI	The Mail on Sunday	814	71%	20%	9%	51%
29 Dec 2000	MORI	The Mail on Sunday	504	73%	15%	12%	58%
13–15 Dec 2000	MORI	News of the World	621	72%	21%	7%	51%
8–9 Jun 2000	MORI	Sunday Telegraph	621	70%	19%	11%	51%
Jun 2000	Gallup (Note: Q: "Which of these statements comes closest to your own view?" "The Monarchy and the Royal Family should stay pretty much as they are now" "The Monarchy and the Royal Family should continue to exist but should become more democratic and approachable, rather like the Monarchy and Royal Family in the Netherlands" "The Monarchy should be abolished and replaced by a non-executive figurehead president like the ones they have in some continental countries")	?	?	87%	11%	3%	76%
8–10 Nov 1999	MORI	Daily Mail	1,019	74%	16%	10%	58%
15–16 Jun 1999	MORI	The Sun	806	74%	16%	10%	58%
5–6 Nov 1998	MORI	Daily Mail/GMTV	1,019	73%	18%	9%	55%
Nov 1998	Gallup	?	?	87%	12%	0%	75%
23–24 Oct 1998	MORI	The Sun	600	74%	16%	10%	58%
18–20 Aug 1998	MORI	The Mail on Sunday	804	75%	16%	9%	59%
17–18 Aug 1998	ICM Research	N/A	500	74%	17%	9%	57%
5–8 Mar 1998	MORI	The Sun	1,000	74%	19%	7%	55%
6–7 Sep 1997	MORI	The Sun	602	73%	18%	9%	55%
Sep 1997	Gallup	?	?	87%	11%	2%	76%
31 Aug 1997	Death of Diana, Princess of Wales						
Nov 1996	Gallup	?	?	81%	16%	3%	65%
Mar 1996	Gallup	?	?	79%	17%	4%	62%
Nov 1995	Gallup	?	?	80%	15%	5%	65%
Oct 1995	Gallup	?	?	82%	13%	6%	69%
28–29 Dec 1994	MORI	?	?	73%	17%	10%	56%
Sep 1994	Gallup	?	?	85%	12%	3%	73%
7–12 Jan 1994	MORI	?	?	71%	20%	10%	51%
Nov 1993	Gallup	?	?	86%	10%	4%	76%
Jun 1993	Gallup	?	?	85%	11%	4%	74%
22–26 Apr 1993	MORI	The Sunday Age (Australia)	1,029	69%	18%	14%	51%
28 Jan – 2 Feb 1993	Gallup	The Daily Telegraph	989	89%	9%	2%	80%
11 Dec 1992	Gallup	The Sunday Telegraph	620	59%	24%	17%	35%
Dec 1992	Gallup	?	?	85%	13%	2%	72%

=== By age ===
March 2024 poll
Age group	18–24	25–34	35–44	45–54	55–64	65+
Elected Head of State	46%	44%	38%	29%	31%	18%
Monarchy	31%	38%	45%	58%	58%	77%
Don't know	22%	19%	17%	12%	11%	4%

== Current monarchy ==
=== Powers ===
Although royal assent is needed for a parliamentary bill in the United Kingdom to become law and the monarch can theoretically act unilaterally without parliament's permission, in practice the principle of the King-in-Parliament (and parliamentary sovereignty) limits this power. The monarchy functions within the principles of parliamentarianism and constitutionalism, where power is indirectly held by the people. During the Victorian era, it was said that the UK was already essentially a republic, and the phrase "crowned republic" has been used to refer it accordingly.

The monarch conventionally exercises their authority in accordance with the will of parliament (in the case of royal assent or the Orders in Council) (Note: The primary concerns around the Privy Council arise from Orders in Council, which are passed by the Queen at a meeting of the Privy Council. Orders in Council are often used for significant actions done by the government, where a statutory instrument laid by an individual minister may not be appropriate. Orders in Council may be prerogative, meaning they exercise a power of the Monarch under the royal prerogative (those which have not been explicitly taken away by Parliament). Prerogative orders are treated as primary legislation. Orders in Council may also be statutory, meaning they are exercising powers granted by an Act of Parliament. These orders are treated as secondary legislation and follow the procedure required by the Statutory Instruments Act 1946. The House of Lords (sitting as the UK's highest court at the time) established in Council of Civil Service Unions v Minister for the Civil Service [1984] UKHL 9 that prerogative orders in Council are subject to judicial review, given some conditions. Statutory orders are subject to judicial review in the same way as statutory instruments laid before parliament.) or the will of the prime minister (in the case of the royal prerogative, which enables the monarch to declare war or deploy the armed forces without parliamentary scrutiny). (Note: In R (Jackson) v Attorney General [2005] UKHL 56 the House of Lords disputed (in obiter dicta) that the sovereignty of Parliament is, in fact, limitless.) No monarch has vetoed a law since the Scottish Militia Bill of 1708.

The lack of limitations on the monarch's de jure power has led proponents such as Graham Smith (CEO of Republic) to criticise the position of monarch as being "unaccountable" and against the notion of popular sovereignty, while the de facto lack of power has been criticised by the same as making the monarch "a fig leaf for prime ministerial powers".

=== Influence and partiality ===
The monarch's role has traditionally included the "right to be consulted, the right to encourage, and the right to warn". To this end, the Prime Minister has a weekly private audience with the monarch that usually takes place every Wednesday. They are under no obligation to follow the monarch's advice, but advocacy groups have expressed concern over the secrecy of these meetings, citing instances when the monarch has failed to be apolitical. In 1973, Queen Elizabeth II succeeded in lobbying the government to make an exception in a bill concerning transparency of shareholdings, citing that "disclosure would be embarrassing".

The monarch is meant to be impartial. However, republicans argue that the royal family are not, and that there are no real checks on their impartiality. They argue that Charles III spoke and acted in ways that were widely interpreted as taking a political stance, citing his refusal to attend a state dinner hosted by Queen Elizabeth II for the Chinese head of state in protest of China's dealings with Tibet; his previous strong stances on topics ranging from GM food to political correctness; and the contents of the black spider memos regarding how people achieve their positions, which were released following freedom of information litigation.

=== Legal exemptions ===
Several laws make exemptions for the monarch and the royal family. The UK monarch benefits from sovereign immunity and cannot be arrested. As of 2022, there were more than 160 laws granting express immunity to the monarch or their property in some respects. For instance, employees of the monarchy cannot pursue anti-discrimination complaints such as those under the Equality Act 2010. The monarchy is exempt from numerous other workers' rights, health and safety, or pensions laws. Republicans also argue that the Royal finances, which are exempt from the Freedom of Information Act, are shrouded in secrecy and should be subject to greater scrutiny. The monarch is exempt from numerous taxes, including inheritance tax, although Queen Elizabeth II did pay some taxes voluntarily.

=== Cost ===
The government allocated £132.1m to the Sovereign Grant for the financial year 2025–26. In 2024, Republic claimed that the monarchy actually cost the government £510m a year (compared to £86.3m in the 2024-25 Sovereign Grant). This number includes the revenue from the duchies of Lancaster and Cornwall (£99m), the surplus from the Royal collection (11.8m), an estimation of security costs (£150m), an estimation of potential revenue from using royal residences for commercial purposes (£96m), spending on royal visits by local authorities (£31.9m) and other sources, though their estimates have been criticised in the past for including speculation on potential lost revenue. Republic assert that the Crown Estate, from which the "hereditary revenues" are derived, is national and State property, so their figures do not take the amount generated for the treasury into account (£190.8m from 2007 to 2008).

In 2011, Republic calculated the UK's monarchy to be the most expensive in Europe, 112 times more expensive than the presidency of the Republic of Ireland. However, some monarchists argue that under a republic, the costs incurred in regards to the duties of the head of state would remain more or less the same, or even increase. They argue that the government would still have to fund the upkeep and conservation of the royal palaces and buildings, as well as the head of state's salary and security. Since ceremonial duties would still go ahead, this would also include the cost of state visits and banquets.

Large royal events can also involve substantial taxpayer support. In 2022, the funeral of Queen Elizabeth II was estimated to have cost £192m, whilst media estimates for the Coronation ceremony for King Charles III in 2023 have ranged from £50m to over £100m.

=== Tourism ===
In 2010, VisitBritain published a report showing that sites related to the royal family brought in over £500m a year in tourism. This was widely reported as being caused by the continued existence of the royal family, though republicans claim that it is the buildings and the history that are truly responsible for that figure, since tourism companies tend not to use the monarchy in advertising.

Brand Finance estimates that the monarchy brings £2.5 billion to the UK economy a year. Forbes instead calculated a figure of £19 billion a year.

=== Hierarchy ===
Since the UK monarchy is hereditary, the monarch's status and power stems from their birth, a fact that has been criticised by republicans as being elitist and outdated. The members and representatives of the royal family are given titles, and are traditionally greeted in the first instance as "Your Majesty" or "Your Royal Highness", then "Sir" or "Ma'am". Such deference has been called an attempt to keep subjects "in their place". Many republicans further argue that the monarchy is too archaic and reminiscent of medieval feudalism for a modern nation.

=== Honorary military positions ===
Many members of the royal family have honorary military positions, despite not having meaningfully served in the armed forces. In the UK alone, Elizabeth II held dozens of honorary positions as colonel-in-chief, despite her lack of military experience. Some republicans, such as Norman Baker, argue that such liberal distribution of unearned honours undermines them for those who did earn them.

Though some royals have been sent into conflict zones, many doubt that they have served on the front line on the same basis as other members of the Armed Forces, viewing it as more of a PR exercise than military service. Andrew Mountbatten-Windsor (then Prince Andrew)'s presence during the Falklands War was later criticised by the commander of the British Naval Force who stated that "special measures" had to be taken to ensure that the (then) Prince did not lose his life.

=== Wealth ===
The monarchy is in possession of vast wealth and assets. Charles III has numerous royal residences, including palaces, castles and estates. Republicans claim that this means the monarch is not in touch with the lives of everyday people, such as those suffering from the cost of living crisis.

=== Race ===
Since it is still unlikely that a non-white person will ascend to the throne for the foreseeable future, some critics, such as Peter Tatchell, have argued that the monarchy of the United Kingdom is incompatible with the multiracial and multicultural British society of the 21st century, and therefore unintentionally a racist institution.

The British monarchy is intimately linked to the history of slavery and colonialism, from funding slave voyages to being the face of imperialism. This has prompted some commentators, such as Kehinde Andrews, to argue that the British monarchy is irreparably racist, being "one of the most powerful symbols of Whiteness and colonial nostalgia". He considers the popularity of the monarchy to be a barrier to white Brits confronting their imperialist past.

Prince Harry described an "unconscious [racial] bias" among family members concerning the skin colour of his unborn son, though he distinguished this from outright racism.

=== Effect on royals ===
Members of the royal family are brought up under a very strict code of behaviour. Some republicans, such as the anarchist William Godwin and the author Johann Hari (in his book God Save the Queen?), argue that the hereditary system condemns every heir to an abnormal childhood, and every royal to psychological damage respectively.

== Counter arguments ==
=== National unity ===
Monarchists argue that a constitutional monarch with limited powers and a non-partisan nature can provide a focus for national unity, national awards and honours, national institutions, patriotism, and allegiance, as opposed to a president affiliated to a political party. British political scientist Vernon Bogdanor suggests that monarchies can play a helpful unifying role in a multinational state, noting that, "In Belgium, it is sometimes said that the king is the only Belgian, everyone else being either Fleming or Walloon" and that the British sovereign can belong to all of the UK's constituent countries (England, Scotland, Wales, and Northern Ireland), without belonging to any particular one of them.

=== Neutrality of the head of state ===
Opinion ratings for elected politicians have consistently been far lower than those of the monarch, so some monarchists argue it is unlikely that a head of state would be as popular as the royals are. Bognador justifies monarchy on the grounds that it provides for a nonpartisan head of state, separate from the head of government, and thus ensures that the highest representative of the country, at home and internationally, does not represent a particular political party, but all people.

=== Extreme politics ===
British-American libertarian writer Matthew Feeney argues that European constitutional monarchies "have managed for the most part to avoid extreme politics" – specifically fascism, communism, and military dictatorship – "in part because monarchies provide a check on the wills of populist politicians" by representing entrenched customs and traditions. Feeny notes that, "European monarchies – such as the Danish, Belgian, Swedish, Dutch, Norwegian, and British – have ruled over countries that are among the most stable, prosperous, and free in the world." Earlier, in 1956, Iain Moncreiffe and Don Pottinger made a similar argument, writing that, "Such countries achieve a national stability of special value in times of extremist party strife – because the monarch has never been elected. Nobody has ever had to take sides to vote for or against him, and so the constitutional monarch provides a symbol of unity above and outside politics."

Thomas Britton writes that elections are always divisive and adding another layer of competition would make a hypothetical presidential election very closely fought, with the results never clear cut. An elected president, as such, would barely represent half of the population, if not then even less. The monarchy, in contrast, is much more popular with the rest of the country.

=== Previous failure ===
A republican government under the Commonwealth of England and then the Commonwealth of England, Scotland, and Ireland has already been tried when Oliver Cromwell installed it on 30 January 1649. Yet by February 1657 some people argued that Cromwell should assume the Crown as it would stabilise the constitution, limit his powers and restore precedent. He declined and within three years of his death the Commonwealth had lost support and the monarchy was restored. During the later Glorious Revolution of 1688, which was itself partially caused by disillusionment with the absolutist rule of James II and VII, it was argued by Parliament and others such as John Locke that James had broken "the original contract" with the state. Far from pressing for a republic, which had been experienced within living memory, they instead argued that the best form of government was a constitutional monarchy with explicitly circumscribed powers, which is the UK's current system of government.

== See also ==
- Abolition of monarchy
- Constitutional reform in the United Kingdom
- Criticism of monarchy
- Irish republicanism
- List of British republicans
- Movement Against the Monarchy
- Republic (pressure group)
- Republicanism in Antigua and Barbuda
- Republicanism in Australia
- Republicanism in Canada
- Republicanism in Jamaica
- Republicanism in New Zealand
- Republicanism in Northern Ireland
- Republicanism in the Bahamas
- Republics in the Commonwealth of Nations
- Scottish republicanism
- Secular state
- Welsh republicanism
- R (Jackson) v Attorney General
