= John Milton's reception history =

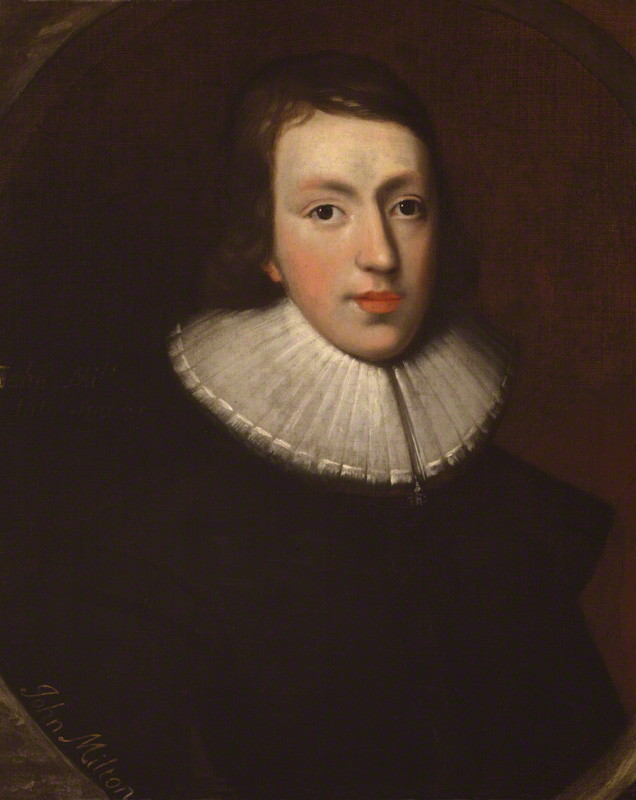
Portrait of John Milton circa 1629

The reception history of John Milton and his works has been a mixture of positive and negative responses, with his greatest influence being found within his poetry.

== Contemporary ==
Milton's later political works were widely known but were highly controversial and criticized, especially after the Restoration. The Tenure of Kings and Magistrates immediately influenced many others, including Bulstrode Whitelocke, John Canne, John Lilburne, John Twyn, and various anonymous works. The amount of attention that the work received prompted John Shawcross to declare that the work, itself, allowed Milton to be viewed as a "great writer". However, the work continued to influence writers later on, including a piece by Algernon Sidney, which copies words directly from The Tenure; many responders to Sidney did not know that the lines were Milton's own.

Eikonoklastes suffered a far different fate; it was able to appeal to a larger audience than many of Milton's previous works and sell well, but it was a failure in turning the public sentiment against Charles I. After the Act of Oblivion was enacted on 29 August 1660, a proclamation by the king demanded that Eikonoklastes and Defensio pro Populo Anglicano be burned. This did not stop the work from selling, and there was a new edition in 1690 after the Glorious Revolution.

== Enlightenment ==
The generation of poets following the Restoration were influenced by Milton's poetry, especially Paradise Lost, and viewed it favorably. Alexander Pope, as poet, was heavily influenced by Milton, but he was not as directly attached to the language and concepts within the poetry as other poets, including the English Romantics. However, near the end of his life Pope planned to compose an epic on Brutus, that was to be written in Miltonic blank verse. John Dryden, in an epigram, believed that Milton ranked with Homer and Virgil; but it is uncertain how sincere Dryden was, given that the conventions of the time expected such lofty commendations of individuals. John Dennis praised Milton for composing a poem that was original, and Voltaire teased that France was unable to produce a similarly original epic.

Samuel Johnson criticized Milton for various things: he attacked Milton for archaic language, he blamed Milton for inspiring bad blank verse, and he could not stand Milton's puritan and republican beliefs. Johnson did respect Milton's poetry, and relied on it for many of the quotes contained in his Dictionary of the English Language.

Johnson's contemporaries had mixed views of Milton. Although Handel experienced success by setting Milton's poetry to music, including Il Penseroso, L'Allegro, and Samson Agonistes, he refused to transform Paradise Lost into an oratorio, objecting to the epic's religious content. Likewise, Edward Gibbon questioned Milton's use of God as a character within a poem and Shaftesbury wondered if it was correct to alter Scripture in such a way. Still, many people believed that Paradise Lost equaled the classical epics.

== Romantics ==
The English Romantic Poets were concerned with Milton's poetry, and they associated themselves with Milton as they sought to explore their own poetic identities. In particular, the various poets relied on images and ideas found in Milton, and they incorporated them into their own works. William Wordsworth, in his The Prelude, relies on Milton's concept of the fall of man in order to revise the myth and to try and overcome the loss of paradise. John Keats, in The Eve of St Agnes, relies on images connected to Paradise Lost and Eve's description. Percy Shelley, in Mont Blanc, relies on Milton's description of sensations, especially smell, to achieve the sublime.

== 20th century ==
Kay Stevenson points out that "Milton's Paradise Lost and Paradise Regained are the seventeenth-century epics which still attract an audience".
