= Alternative Economic Strategy =

Economic policy proposed by Tony Benn

The Alternative Economic Strategy (AES) is the name of an economic programme proposed by Tony Benn, a dissident member of the British Labour Party, during the 1970s and 1980s. The Secretary of State for Industry in the Labour government, Tony Benn, wrote a paper for his Department in January 1975, which he described in his diary: "It described Strategy A which is the Government of national unity, the Tory strategy of a pay policy, higher taxes all round and deflation, with Britain staying in the Common Market. Then Strategy B which is the real Labour policy of saving jobs, a vigorous micro-investment programme, import control, control of the banks and insurance companies, control of export, of capital, higher taxation of the rich, and Britain leaving the Common Market."

With Britain in economic crisis in October 1976, Benn put forward the AES in Cabinet with the partial support of Peter Shore. Benn said the two courses open to the government were the monetarist, deflationary course recommended by the Treasury and "the protectionist course which is the one I have consistently recommended for two and a half years...protectionism is a perfectly respectable course of action. It is compatible with our strategy. You withdraw behind walls and reconstruct and re-emerge". Benn further said that both courses were a "siege economy" but the difference is that in the monetarist course "you will have the bankers with you and the British people, the trade unions, outside the citadel storming you; with mine it will be the other way round". However the Cabinet rejected the AES (along with two other proposals) on 1 or 2 December and accepted the terms for a loan from the International Monetary Fund on 12 December.

== See also ==
- Bennism
- 1976 sterling crisis
