= Commonwealth of Britain Bill =

Proposed Act of Parliament of the UK

- Bill
- Parliament of the United Kingdom
- Long title: A Bill to establish a democratic, federal and secular Commonwealth of England, Scotland and Wales dedicated to the welfare of all its citizens; to establish fundamental human rights within that Commonwealth; to lower the voting age to 16 years and to make other provision with respect to elections, including equal representation for women; to prescribe a constitutional oath; to establish a Commonwealth Parliament consisting of the House of Commons and the House of the People and to make provision for the term of a Parliament and for legislative and other procedure; to establish the office of President, and a Council of State, and to prescribe the powers of each; to provide for the formation of governments; to amend the law relating to official information, the armed forces and the security services; to make fresh provision for the participation of Britain in the United Nations Organisation and the European Communities; to make the basing of foreign forces in Britain dependent upon the approval of the House of Commons; to make new provision with respect to the judicial system and to establish a National Legal Service; to set up national Parliaments for England, Scotland and Wales; to amend the law relating to local government, the district auditor and the accountability of police forces; to end the constitutional status of the Crown and to make certain consequential provision; to abolish the House of Lords and the Privy Council, to end the recognition in law of personal titles, and to provide for the acknowledgement of service to the community; to disestablish the Church of England, abolish the offence of blasphemy, and to provide for equality under the law for all religions and beliefs; to end British jurisdiction in Northern Ireland; to provide for a Constitution and for constitutional amendment; and to make transitional and related provision.
- Introduced by: Tony Benn (Commons)

Status: Not passed

The Commonwealth of Britain Bill was a bill first introduced in the House of Commons in 1991 by Tony Benn, then a Labour Member of Parliament (MP). It was seconded by the future Leader of the Labour Party, Jeremy Corbyn.

The Bill proposed abolishing the British monarchy, with the United Kingdom becoming a "democratic, federal and secular Commonwealth of Britain", or in effect a republic with a codified constitution. It was introduced by Benn a number of times until Benn's retirement in 2001, but never achieved a second reading.

== Overview of bill ==
Under the provisions of the bill:

- The monarchy would be abolished and the constitutional status of the Crown ended.
- Britain would be re-established as a parliamentary republic called the "Commonwealth of Britain", with a President elected by a joint sitting of the Houses of Parliament serving as head of state in a ceremonial capacity;
- The reserve powers of the British monarch would be transferred to the President, to exercise on the advice of either the Prime Minister, or by a resolution of the House of Commons;
- Former Crown lands, buildings, and properties would be transferred to the Commonwealth of Britain government;
- The Church of England would be disestablished, with the Commonwealth being a secular state. Powers over faith, doctrine, liturgy, property, discipline and appointments formerly exercised by the Crown, Parliament or private patrons would be transferred to the General Synod of the Church of England;
- The Privy Council would be abolished, and replaced by a Council of State;
- The House of Lords would be replaced by an elected House of the People that proportionally represents the nations of England, Scotland, and Wales, with equal representation of men and women;
- The House of Commons would similarly have equal representation of men and women;
- England, Scotland and Wales would have their own devolved national parliaments with responsibility for devolved matters as agreed, and the power of local authorities would be free to act in the interests of their constituencies, barring acts banned by an act of Parliament;
- County Court judges and magistrates would be elected;
- The Commonwealth of Britain would renounce jurisdiction over Northern Ireland;
- The judiciary would be reformed and a National Legal Service would be created.
- The Official Secrets Acts 1911, 1920, 1939, and 1989 would be repealed, and all official information published or available on request, save for information relating to defense and security matters, economic policy, international relations, and personal data;
- The constitution would be codified and an amendment process established.
- The voting age would be lowered from 18 to 16.
- MPs and other officials would swear oaths to the Constitution, not the Crown.

== History ==
Three years prior to the first introduction of the Commonwealth of Britain Bill, Charter 88 was launched, aiming to codify civil rights. Tony Benn argued that due to Charter 88 having to maintain a coalition of judges, lawyers, as well as politicians from the Liberal Party, Social Democratic Party and some establishment figures in the Labour Party, that Charter 88 could not properly advocate for economic and social rights.

Instead, Benn argued that codifying a constitution that enshrined civil, economic and social rights would be a "mechanism to advance people’s interests and goals collectively, in determining the kind of society they want."

Benn first introduced the Commonwealth of Britain bill in 1991, with it being seconded by Jeremy Corbyn. It was again introduced in December 1992. Benn didn't believe the bill would pass, but instead hoped to educate about how different society could be.

== See also ==
- Charter 88
- Common Sense (book)
- Constitution of the United Kingdom (reform)
- Disestablishmentarianism
- Oath of Allegiance (United Kingdom)
- Reform of the House of Lords
- Republic (political organisation)
- Republicanism in the United Kingdom
- Secularism in the United Kingdom
- Separation of church and state
- United Ireland

== Bibliography ==
- Benn, Tony; Hood, Andrew (1993), Winstone, Ruth (ed.), Common Sense, Hutchinson, ISBN 0-09-177308-3
- Goodwin, Stephen (12 December 1992). "Benn Revives Bill to Replace Monarch with a President". The Independent.
- Rush, Martyn (26 February 2021). "Tony Benn's Plan to Democratise Britain – and Abolish the Monarchy". Tribune.
