= The Tenure of Kings and Magistrates =

Book on constitutional theory by John Milton

The Tenure of Kings and Magistrates is a 1649 book by the English poet and polemicist John Milton, in which he defends the right of people to execute a guilty sovereign, whether tyrannical or not. The work appeared five times: in 1649, perhaps written during the trial of Charles I of England, with a second edition following in 1650 ("with improvements"), and twice in collections (Works, 1697, and Complete Collection, 1698). A final edition, revised, retitled, and presenting somewhat altered views, appeared in 1689. "Milton’s case was not that Charles I was guilty as charged, but that Parliament had the right to prosecute him."

In the text, Milton conjectures about the formation of commonwealths. He comes up with a kind of constitutionalism, but not an outright anti-monarchical argument. He gives a theory of how people come into commonwealths and come to elect kings. He explains what the role of a king should be, and conversely what a tyrant is, and why it is necessary to limit a ruler's power through laws and oaths. Milton's controversial denial of the divine right of kings prevented widespread acceptance of The Tenure of Kings and Magistrates.

== Full title ==
The Tenure of Kings and Magistrates: proving that it is lawful, and hath been held so through the ages, for any, who has the Power, to call to account a Tyrant, or wicked King, and after due conviction, to depose, and put him to death; if the ordinary MAGISTRATE have neglected, or deny’d to do it. And that they, who of late so much blame Deposing, are the Men that did it themselves.

== Background and context ==
In February 1649, less than two weeks after the Parliament of England executed Charles I, Milton published The Tenure of Kings and Magistrates to justify the action and to defend the government against the Presbyterians who initially voted for the regicide and later condemned it, and whose practices he believed were a "growing threat to freedom." Milton aimed to expose false reasoning from the opposition, citing scripture throughout the Tenure of Kings and Magistrates to counter biblical reference that would cast holy and public disapproval on Parliament's actions. "Milton’s case was not that Charles I was guilty as charged, but that Parliament had the right to prosecute him." Milton later remarked that the piece was "written to reconcile men's minds, rather than to determine anything about Charles".

The work also rebuts theories posited by Robert Filmer and Thomas Hobbes. Specifically, Milton took issue with the notions that a separation of powers leads to anarchy and that the king's power was naturally absolute.

The work appeared five times: in 1649, perhaps written during the King's trial, with a second edition following in 1650 ("with improvements"), and twice in collections (Works, 1697, and Complete Collection, 1698). A final edition, revised, retitled, and presenting somewhat altered views, appeared in 1689 during a controversy over the succession of William III of England. This edition, titled Pro Populo Adversus Tyrannos: Or the Sovereign Right and Power of the People over Tyrants, may have been edited by James Tyrell, a historian, but continued to be advertised, in 1691, as being Milton's work.

== Tract ==
Milton begins The Tenure of Kings and Magistrates by paraphrasing the words of Sallust to describe the nature of tyranny:

Hence is it that Tyrants are not oft offended, nor stand much in doubt of bad men, as being all naturally servile; but in whom vertue and true worth most is eminent, them they feare in earnest, as by right thir Maisters, against them lies all thir hatred and suspicion. Consequentlie neither doe bad men hate Tyrants, but have been alwayes readiest with the falsifi'd names of Loyalty, and Obedience, to colour over thir base compliances.

Milton continues by discussing the nature of law, and the rule of law, and the private sphere:

And surely they that shall boast, as we doe, to be a free Nation, and not have in themselves the power to remove, or to abolish any governour supreme, or subordinat, with the government it self upon urgent causes, may please thir fancy with a ridiculous and painted freedom, fit to coz'n babies; but are indeed under tyranny and servitude; as wanting that power, which is the root and source of all liberty, to dispose and œconomize in the Land which God hath giv'n them, as Maisters of Family in thir own house and free inheritance. Without which natural and essential power of a free Nation, though bearing high thir heads, they can in due esteem be thought no better than slaves and vassals born, in the tenure and occupation of another inheriting Lord. Whose government, though not illegal, or intolerable, hangs over them as a Lordly scourge, not as a free government; and therfore to be abrogated. How much more justly then may they fling off tyranny, or tyrants; who being once depos'd can be no more the privat men, as subject to the reach of Justice and arraignment as any other transgressors.

Milton calls on the people to support Parliament's actions and wisdom:

Another sort there is, who comming in the cours of these affaires, to have thir share in great actions, above the form of Law or Custom, at least to give thir voice and approbation, begin to swerve, and almost shiver at the Majesty and grandeur of som noble deed, as if they were newly enter'd into a great sin; disputing presidents, forms, and circumstances, when the Common-wealth nigh perishes for want of deeds in substance, don with just and faithfull expedition. To these I wish better instruction, and vertue equal to thir calling; the former of which, that is to say Instruction, I shall indeavour, as my dutie is, to bestow on them; and exhort them not to startle from the just and pious resolution of adhering with all thir strength & assistance to the present Parlament & Army, in the glorious way wherin Justice and Victory hath set them;

== Themes ==
Jonathan Scott believed that The Tenure of Kings and Magistrates was one of the "key republican texts" during the 17th century. However, Milton gave up parts of his Republican views to support Parliament, especially when he called for the people to support the government. "[It is] more properly termed a regicide tract, justifying the killing of King Charles I, rather than a republican tract, justifying the establishment of a new kind of government."

The argument in The Tenure of Kings and Magistrates is complicated, and Milton attempts to reexplain his views in Eikonoklastes. With both pieces Milton attempted to disrupt the popular image of Charles I as innocent (Eikonoklastes means "image breaker").

The work is unique compared to other works during its time because Milton emphasises the deeds of individuals as the only way for there to be justice. The work also emphasises the freedom of the individual, and only through such freedom is an individual able to develop properly. Citing classical and biblical references, this emphasis refutes the divine right of kings, as well as Hobbes's idea of absolute power held by a monarch. Milton argues that no man is better than another, having all been created in God's image, free and equal, and that all have a right to dispose of themselves. Further, he argues that their freedom and equality entitles them to inflict the same treatment upon the king they would receive at the hands of the law, that magistrates are empowered by the people:

It being thus manifest that the power of Kings and Magistrates is nothing else, but what is only derivative, transferr’d and committed to them in trust from the People, to the Common good of them all, in whom the power yet remains fundamentally, and cannot be tak’n from them, without a violation of thir natural birthright.

Milton emphasises the concept of trust, instilled in the king by the people, and the dynasty's violation of that trust. He describes the crimes perpetrated by the executed King, asserting that kings are accountable to more than just God.

Also, Milton emphasises the importance of an education focusing on the ability to discriminate between ideas and establishing self-discipline.

== Reception ==
The Tenure of Kings and Magistrates immediately influenced the political works and theories of many others, including Bulstrode Whitelocke, John Canne, John Lilburne, John Twyn, and various anonymous works. The amount of attention that the work received prompted John Shawcross to declare that the work, itself, allowed Milton to be viewed as a "great writer". Later on, the work was able to influence others without them knowing; a piece by Algernon Sidney, which copies words directly from The Tenure of Kings and Magistrates, influenced various tracts and many responders to Sidney did not know that the lines were originally from Milton.

Milton's controversial denial of the divine right of kings prevented widespread acceptance of The Tenure of Kings and Magistrates.

The song Curse my Name by the German metal band Blind Guardian is an interpretation of Milton's tract.
