= John Twyn =

English printer

John Twyn (c. 1619 – 24 February 1664) was an English printer who was executed in 1664 for publishing A Treatise of the Execution of Justice, a pamphlet supporting rebellion against King Charles II which his press censor Roger L'Estrange deemed to be treasonous. He was tried on 20 and 22 February 1664 alongside bookseller Thomas Brewster, printer Simon Dover and bookbinder Nathan Brooks.

The 74-page pamphlet An Exact Narrative of the Tryal and Condemnation of John Twyn (1664) ostensibly documents the trial in order to discourage dissenting texts from being published.

He was sentenced by Chief Justice Hyde to be hung, drawn, and quartered.
