= List of acts of the Parliament of Great Britain from 1707 =

This is a complete list of acts of the Parliament of Great Britain for the year 1707.

For acts passed until 1707, see the list of acts of the Parliament of England and the list of acts of the Parliament of Scotland. See also the list of acts of the Parliament of Ireland.

For acts passed from 1801 onwards, see the list of acts of the Parliament of the United Kingdom. For acts of the devolved parliaments and assemblies in the United Kingdom, see the list of acts of the Scottish Parliament, the list of acts of the Northern Ireland Assembly, and the list of acts and measures of Senedd Cymru; see also the list of acts of the Parliament of Northern Ireland.

The number shown after each act's title is its chapter number. Acts are cited using this number, preceded by the years of the reign during which the relevant parliamentary session was held; thus the Union with Ireland Act 1800 is cited as "39 & 40 Geo. 3. c. 67", meaning the 67th act passed during the session that started in the 39th year of the reign of George III and which finished in the 40th year of that reign. Note that the modern convention is to use Arabic numerals in citations (thus "41 Geo. 3" rather than "41 Geo. III"). Acts of the last session of the Parliament of Great Britain and the first session of the Parliament of the United Kingdom are both cited as "41 Geo. 3".

Acts passed by the Parliament of Great Britain did not have a short title; however, some of these acts have subsequently been given a short title by acts of the Parliament of the United Kingdom (such as the Short Titles Act 1896).

Before the Acts of Parliament (Commencement) Act 1793 came into force on 8 April 1793, acts passed by the Parliament of Great Britain were deemed to have come into effect on the first day of the session in which they were passed. Because of this, the years given in the list below may in fact be the year before a particular act was passed.

== 6 Ann. ==
The 1st Parliament of Great Britain, which met from 23 October 1707 until 1 April 1708.

This session was also traditionally cited as 6 Anne or 6 A.

45 public acts and 30 private acts were passed.

=== Public acts ===
Short title	Citation	Royal assent
Long title
Land Tax Act 1707 (repealed)	6 Ann. c. 35 (Note: This is the chapter in The Statutes of the Realm.); 6 Ann. c. 1 (Note: This is the chapter in The Statutes at Large.)	18 December 1707
An Act for granting an Aid to Her Majesty, to be raised by a Land Tax in Great Britain, for the Service of the Year One Thousand Seven Hundred and Eight. (Repealed by Statute Law Revision Act 1867 (30 & 31 Vict. c. 59))
Repeal of Certain Scotch Acts 1707 (repealed)	6 Ann. c. 36; 6 Ann. c. 2	18 December 1707
An Act for repealing and declaring the Determination of Two Acts passed in the Parliament of Scotland; the One, intituled, "An Act for the Security of the Kingdom;" (Note: Act of Security 1704 (c.3 (S))) the other, "Act anent Peace and War." (Note: Peace and War Act 1703 (c. 6) (S))) (Repealed by Statute Law Revision Act 1867 (30 & 31 Vict. c. 59))
Duties on East India Goods Act 1707 (repealed)	6 Ann. c. 37; 6 Ann. c. 3	18 December 1707
An Act for better Securing the Duties of East India Goods. (Repealed by Customs Law Repeal Act 1825 (6 Geo. 4. c. 105))
Taxation Act 1707 (repealed)	6 Ann. c. 38; 6 Ann. c. 4	20 December 1707
An Act for charging and continuing the Duties upon Malt, Mum, Cyder, and Perry, for the Service of the Year One Thousand Seven Hundred and Eight. (Repealed by Statute Law Revision Act 1867 (30 & 31 Vict. c. 59))
Taxation (No. 2) Act 1707 (repealed)	6 Ann. c. 39; 6 Ann. c. 5	13 February 1708
An Act for raising a further Supply to Her Majesty, for the Service of the Year One Thousand Seven Hundred and Eight, and other Uses, by Sale of Annuities, charged on a Fund not exceeding Forty Thousand Pounds per Annum, to arise by appropriating several Surpluses, and by granting further Terms in the Duties on Low Wines, and on Hawkers, Pedlars, and Petty Chapmen, the Stamp Duties, the One Third Subsidy, the Duty on Sweets, and One of the Branches of Excise, and by making other Provision in this Act mentioned. (Repealed by Statute Law Revision Act 1867 (30 & 31 Vict. c. 59))
Union with Scotland (Amendment) Act 1707	6 Ann. c. 40; 6 Ann. c. 6	13 February 1708
An Act for rendring the Union of the Two Kingdoms more entire and complete.
Succession to the Crown Act 1707	6 Ann. c. 41; 6 Ann. c. 7	13 February 1708
An Act for the Security of Her Majesty's Person and Government, and of the Succession to the Crown of Great Britain in the Protestant Line.
Bath Highway, Streets, etc. Act 1707 (repealed)	6 Ann. c. 42; 6 Ann. c. 1 Pr.	13 February 1708
An Act for repairing, amending, and enlarging the Highways, between the Top of Kingsdown Hill (Note: Kingsdown Hill is adjacent to Kingsdown in Somerset. 51°24′10″N 2°16′12″W) and the City of Bath, and also several other Highways leading to and through the said City; and for cleansing, paving, and lightening the Streets, and regulating the Chairmen there. (Repealed by Bath (Streets, Buildings, Watch, etc.) Act 1757 (30 Geo. 2. c. 65) and Bath Roads Act 1793 (33 Geo. 3. c. 144))
Woollen Cloths Act 1707 (repealed)	6 Ann. c. 43; 6 Ann. c. 8	23 February 1708
An Act for encouraging the dressing and dying of Woollen Cloths within this Kingdom, by laying a Duty upon Broad Cloth exported White. (Repealed by Statute Law Revision Act 1867 (30 & 31 Vict. c. 59))
Exportation Act 1707 (repealed)	6 Ann. c. 44; 6 Ann. c. 9	23 February 1708
An Act for the Exportation of White Woollen Cloth. (Repealed by Statute Law Revision Act 1867 (30 & 31 Vict. c. 59))
Recruiting Act 1707 (repealed)	6 Ann. c. 45; 6 Ann. c. 10	23 February 1708
An Act for the better recruiting Her Majesty's Land Forces and the Marines, for the Year One Thousand Seven Hundred and Eight. (Repealed by Statute Law Revision Act 1867 (30 & 31 Vict. c. 59))
Plymouth Workhouse Act 1707 (repealed)	6 Ann. c. 46; 6 Ann. c. 6 Pr.	23 February 1708
An Act for erecting a Workhouse in the Town and Borough of Plimouth, in the County of Devon; and for setting the Poor on Work, and maintaining them there. (Repealed by Statute Law (Repeals) Act 2008 (c. 12))
Roads (London to Harwich) Act 1707 (repealed)	6 Ann. c. 47; 6 Ann. c. 7 Pr.	23 February 1708
An Act for enlarging the Term in an Act, made in the Seventh Year of His late Majesty, (Note: London to Harwich Roads Act 1695 (7 & 8 Will. 3. c. 9)) for repairing the Highways between the City of London, and the Town of Harwich, in the County of Essex. (Repealed by Statute Law (Repeals) Act 2008 (c. 12))
Taxation (No. 3) Act 1707 (repealed)	6 Ann. c. 48; 6 Ann. c. 11	11 March 1708
An Act for continuing One Half Part of the Subsidies of Tonnage and Poundage, and other Duties upon Wines, Goods, and Merchandizes imported, which were granted to the Crown in the Twelfth Year of the Reign of King Charles the Second; and for settling a Fund thereby, and by other Ways and Means for Payment of Annuities, not exceeding Eighty Thousand Pounds per Annum, to be sold, for raising a further Supply to Her Majesty, for the Service of the Year One Thousand Seven Hundred and Eight, and other Uses therein expressed. (Repealed by Statute Law Revision Act 1867 (30 & 31 Vict. c. 59))
Taxation (No. 4) Act 1707 (repealed)	6 Ann. c. 49; 6 Ann. c. 12	11 March 1708
An Act to explain the Act of the last Session of Parliament, for the Ease of Her Majesty's Subjects, in relation to Allowances out of the Duties upon Salt carried Coastwise; (Note: Duties on Salt, etc. Act 1706 (6 Ann. c. 29)) and also an Act of the First Year of Her Majesty's Reign, in relation to certain Salt-works, near the Sea-side, and Bay of Holly-Head, in the County of Anglesea. (Note: Salt Duties, etc. Act 1702 (1 Ann. c. 15)) (Repealed by Statute Law Revision Act 1867 (30 & 31 Vict. c. 59))
Taxation (No. 5) Act 1707 (repealed)	6 Ann. c. 50; 6 Ann. c. 22	1 April 1708
An Act for continuing several Duties therein mentioned, upon Coffee, Chocolate, Spices, Pictures, and Muslins, and additional Duties upon several of the said Commodities, and certain Duties upon Calicoes, China Wares, and Drugs; and for continuing the Duties called the Two Third Subsidies of Tonnage and Poundage, for preserving the Public Credit; and for ascertaining the Duties of Coals exported for Foreign Parts; and for securing the Credit of the Bank of England; and for passing several Accompts of Taxes raised in the County of Monmouth; and for promoting the Consumption of such Tobacco as shall have paid Her Majesty's Duties. (Repealed by Statute Law Revision Act 1867 (30 & 31 Vict. c. 59))
Equivalent Money Act 1707 (repealed)	6 Ann. c. 51; 6 Ann. c. 24	1 April 1708
An Act for the further directing the Payment of the Equivalent-money. (Repealed by Statute Law Revision Act 1867 (30 & 31 Vict. c. 59))
Duchy of Cornwall Act 1707 (repealed)	6 Ann. c. 52; 6 Ann. c. 25	1 April 1708
An Act to enable Her Majesty to make Leases and Copies of Offices, Lands, and Hereditaments, Parcel of Her Dutchy of Cornwall, or annexed to the same. (Repealed by Statute Law Revision Act 1948 (11 & 12 Geo. 6. c. 62))
Exchequer Court (Scotland) Act 1707	6 Ann. c. 53; 6 Ann. c. 26	1 April 1708
An Act for settling and establishing a Court of Exchequer in the North Part of Great Britain, called Scotland.
Queen Anne's Bounty Act 1707 (repealed)	6 Ann. c. 54; 6 Ann. c. 27	1 April 1708
An Act to inlarge the Time for returning the Certificates of all Ecclesiastical Livings not exceeding the Yearly Value of Fifty Pounds, as also for discharging all Livings of that Value from the Payment of First Fruits; and for allowing Time to Archbishops and Bishops, and other Dignitaries, for Payment of their First Fruits. (Repealed by First Fruits and Tenths Measure 1926 (16 & 17 Geo. 5. No. 5))
Tithes Act 1707 (repealed)	6 Ann. c. 55; 6 Ann. c. 28	1 April 1708
An Act for continuing the Act for ascertaining the Tithes of Hemp and Flax. (Note: Tithes of Hemp and Flax Act 1698 (11 Will. 3. c. 16)) (Repealed by Statute Law Revision Act 1867 (30 & 31 Vict. c. 59))
Highways Act 1707 (repealed)	6 Ann. c. 56; 6 Ann. c. 29	1 April 1708
An Act to repeal a Clause in an Act of the Seventh Year of the Reign of His late Majesty (for amending and repairing the Highways) (Note: Highways Act 1695 (7 & 8 Will. 3. c. 29)) which enjoins Waggoners and others to draw with a Pole between the Wheel Horses, or with Double Shafts; and to oblige them to draw only with Six Horses, or other Beasts, except up Hills. (Repealed by Highways (No. 2) Act 1766 (7 Geo. 3. c. 42))
Coinage in American Plantations Act 1707 (repealed)	6 Ann. c. 57; 6 Ann. c. 30	1 April 1708
An Act for ascertaining the Rates of Foreign Coins in Her Majesty's Plantations in America. (Repealed by Coinage Act 1870 (33 & 34 Vict. c. 10))
Mischiefs from Fire Act 1707 or the Building Act 1707 (repealed)	6 Ann. c. 58; 6 Ann. c. 31	1 April 1708
An Act for the better preventing Mischiefs that may happen by Fire. (Repealed by Metropolitan Buildings Act 1772 (12 Geo. 3. c. 73))
Bank of England Act 1707 (repealed)	6 Ann. c. 59; 6 Ann. c. 32	1 April 1708
An Act for regulating the Qualifications of the Elections of the Governor, Deputy Governor, Directors, and Voters, of the Governor and Company of the Bank of England. (Repealed by Bank Act 1892 (55 & 56 Vict. c. 48))
Importation Act 1707 (repealed)	6 Ann. c. 60; 6 Ann. c. 33	1 April 1708
An Act for the Importation of Cochineal from any Ports in Spain during the present War, (Note: The War of the Spanish Succession.) and Six Months longer. (Repealed by Repeal of Acts Concerning Importation (No. 2) Act 1822 (3 Geo. 4. c. 42))
Forfeited Estates Act 1707 (repealed)	6 Ann. c. 61; 6 Ann. c. 34	1 April 1708
An Act for limiting a Time to Persons to come in, and make their Claims to any of the forfeited Estates, and other Interests in Ireland, sold by the Trustees for Sale of those Estates to the Governor and Company for Making Hollow Sword-Blades in England, and divers other Purchasers. (Repealed by Statute Law Revision Act 1867 (30 & 31 Vict. c. 59))
Yorkshire (East Riding) Land Registry Act 1707 (repealed)	6 Ann. c. 62; 6 Ann. c. 35	1 April 1708
An Act for the publick registering of all Deeds, Conveyances, Wills, and other Incumbrances, that shall be made of, or that may affect, any Honours, Manors, Lands, Tenements, or Hereditaments, within the East Riding of the County of York, or the Town and County of the Town of Kingston upon Hull, after the Nine and Twentieth Day of September One Thousand Seven Hundred and Eight; and for the rendring the Register in the West Riding more complete. (Repealed by Yorkshire Registries Act 1884 (47 & 48 Vict. c. 54))
Militia Act 1707 (repealed)	6 Ann. c. 63; 6 Ann. c. 36	1 April 1708
An Act for raising the Militia of this Kingdom for the Year One Thousand Seven Hundred and Eight, although the Month's Pay formerly advanced be not re-paid. (Repealed by Statute Law Revision Act 1867 (30 & 31 Vict. c. 59))
Trade to America Act 1707 or the Colonial Impressment Act 1707 (repealed)	6 Ann. c. 64; 6 Ann. c. 37	1 April 1708
An Act for the Encouragement of the Trade to America. (Repealed by Naval Prize Acts Repeal Act 1864 (27 & 28 Vict. c. 23))
Security to Merchant Ships Act 1707 or the Cruizers and Convoys Act 1708 (repealed)	6 Ann. c. 65; 6 Ann. c. 13	11 March 1708
An Act for the better securing the Trade of this Kingdom, by Cruizers and Convoys. (Repealed by Naval Prize Acts Repeal Act 1864 (27 & 28 Vict. c. 23))
Security of the Sovereign Act 1707 (repealed)	6 Ann. c. 66; 6 Ann. c. 14	11 March 1708
An Act for the better Security of Her Majesty's Person and Government. (Repealed by Promissory Oaths Act 1871 (34 & 35 Vict. c. 48))
Habeas Corpus Suspension Act 1707 (repealed)	6 Ann. c. 67; 6 Ann. c. 15	11 March 1708
An Act to empower Her Majesty to secure and detain such Persons as Her Majesty shall suspect are conspiring against Her Person or Government. (Repealed by Statute Law Revision Act 1867 (30 & 31 Vict. c. 59))
City of London (Garbling of Spices and Admission of Brokers) Act 1707 (repealed)	6 Ann. c. 68; 6 Ann. c. 16	11 March 1708
An Act for repealing the Act of the First Year of King James the First, intituled "An Act for the well garbling of spices;" (Note: Spices Act 1603 (1 Jas. 1 c. 19)) and for granting an Equivalent to the City of London by admitting Brokers. (Repealed by Food and Drugs Act 1938 (1 & 2 Geo. 6. c. 56))
Watchet Harbour Act 1707 (repealed)	6 Ann. c. 69; 6 Ann. c. 8 Pr.	11 March 1708
An Act for repairing the Harbour and Key of Watchett, in the County of Somerset. (Repealed by Watchet Harbour Act 1857 (20 & 21 Vict. c. cxli))
River Tone Improvement Act 1707	6 Ann. c. 70; 6 Ann. c. 9 Pr.	11 March 1708
An Act for the more effectual making and keeping the River Tone navigable, from Bridgewater to Taunton, in the County of Somerset.
East India Company Act 1707 (repealed)	6 Ann. c. 71; 6 Ann. c. 17	20 March 1708
An Act for assuring to the English Company, trading to The East Indies, on Account of the United Stock, a longer Time in the Fund and Trade therein mentioned; and for raising thereby the Sum of Twelve Hundred Thousand Pounds, for carrying on the War, and other Her Majesty's Occasions. (Repealed by Statute Law Revision Act 1867 (30 & 31 Vict. c. 59))
Cestui que Vie Act 1707	6 Ann. c. 72; 6 Ann. c. 18	20 March 1708
An Act for the more effectual Discovery of the Death of Persons pretended to be alive, to the Prejudice of those who claim Estates after their Deaths.
Taxation (No. 6) Act 1707 (repealed)	6 Ann. c. 73; 6 Ann. c. 19	20 March 1708
An Act for continuing the Half Subsidies therein mentioned, with several Impositions and other Duties, to raise Money, by Way of Loan, for the Service of the War, and other Her Majesty's necessary and important Occasions; and for charging of Prize Goods and Seizures; and for taking off the Drawbacks of Foreign Cordage; and to obviate the clandestine Importation of Wrought Silks. (Repealed by Statute Law Revision Act 1867 (30 & 31 Vict. c. 59))
Mutiny Act 1707 (repealed)	6 Ann. c. 74; 6 Ann. c. 20	20 March 1708
An Act for continuing an Act, made in the Third Year of Her Majesty's Reign, intituled, "An Act for punishing Mutiny and Desertion, and false Musters; and for the better Payment of the Army and Quarters." (Note: Mutiny Act 1703 (2 & 3 Ann. c. 17)) (Repealed by Statute Law Revision Act 1867 (30 & 31 Vict. c. 59))
Cathedral Statutes Act 1707 (repealed)	6 Ann. c. 75; 6 Ann. c. 21	20 March 1708
An Act for the avoiding of Doubts and Questions touching the Statutes of divers Cathedrals and Collegiate Churches. (Repealed by Cathedrals Measure 1963 (No. 2))
Wilts Highways Act 1707 (repealed)	6 Ann. c. 76; 6 Ann. c. 14 Pr.	20 March 1708
An Act for the better Amendment of that Way which leads from Cherrill through Calne, to Studley Bridge, in the County of Wilts. (Repealed by Road to Studley Bridge Act 1813 (53 Geo. 3. c. cxxviii) and Annual Turnpike Acts Continuance Act 1871 (34 & 35 Vict. c. 115))
Old Stratford to Dunchurch Road Act 1707 (repealed)	6 Ann. c. 77; 6 Ann. c. 15 Pr.	20 March 1708
An Act for repairing the Highways from Old Stratford, (Note: Old Stratford, Northamptonshire. 52°03′48″N 0°51′53″W) in the County of Northampton, to Dunchurch, (Note: Dunchurch, Warwickshire. 52°20′13″N 1°17′23″W) in the County of Warwick. (Repealed by Old Stratford to Dunchurch Road Act 1775 (15 Geo. 3. c. 73))
Scottish Representative Peers Act 1707 (repealed)	6 Ann. c. 78; 6 Ann. c. 23	1 April 1708
An Act to make further Provision for electing and summoning Sixteen Peers of Scotland, to sit in the House of Peers in the Parliament of Great Britain; and for trying Peers for Offences committed in Scotland; and for the further regulating of Voters in Elections of Members to serve in Parliament. (Repealed by Peerage Act 1963 (c. 48))
East Tarbet Harbour Act 1707	6 Ann. c. 79; 6 Ann. c. 13 Pr.	20 March 1708
An Act for erecting a Harbour or Key at East Tarbett, in the Shire of Argyle.

=== Private acts ===
Short title	Citation	Royal assent
Long title
Freeman's Estate Act 1707	6 Ann. c. 1 Pr. (Note: This is the chapter in The Statutes of the Realm.); 6 Ann. c. 2 Pr. (Note: This is the chapter in the Statutes at Large.)	13 February 1708
An Act for vesting in Ralph Freman the Younger Esquire, and his Heirs, divers Manors and Lands in the County of Essex, comprised in his Marriage Settlement; he having settled other Manors and Lands, in the County of Hertford, of greater Value, to the like Uses, in Lieu thereof.
Clarke's Naturalization Act 1707	6 Ann. c. 2 Pr. 6 Ann. c. 3 Pr.	13 February 1708
An Act for naturalizing Katherine Clerke, Daughter of Sir Wm. Clerke Baronet, deceased.
Santos's Naturalization Act 1707	6 Ann. c. 3 Pr. 6 Ann. c. 4 Pr.	13 February 1708
An Act for naturalizing Marcos dos Santos.
Thompson's Letters Patent Act 1707	6 Ann. c. 4 Pr. 6 Ann. c. 5 Pr.	13 February 1708
An Act for making good to William Thompson Esquire, the Benefit intended to be granted to his Ancestors, and their Heirs, by certain Letters Patents of King Charles the Second, in Lieu of the Castle of Scarborough, and other Things, by them surrendered to, and now enjoyed by, the Crown.
Earl of Exeter's Estate Act 1707	6 Ann. c. 5 Pr. 6 Ann. c. 10 Pr.	11 March 1708
An Act for settling the Estate of John now Earl of Exeter, pursuant to Agreements made on the Marriage of the same Earl with Elizabeth Countess of Exeter, his now Wife, subject to such Alterations as are mentioned herein.
Caldecot's Estate Act 1707	6 Ann. c. 6 Pr. 6 Ann. c. 11 Pr.	11 March 1708
An Act to supply a Defect in an Act of Parliament made in the First Year of the Reign of Her present Majesty Queen Anne, intituled, (Note: Caldecot's Estate Act 1702 (1 Ann. St. 2. c. 28 Pr.)) An Act for raising Fifteen Hundred Pounds, by Mortgage of Lands, in the County of Dorset, for Payment of Debts, and for a further Provision and Maintenance for the Younger Children of Phillip Caldecot Esquire.
Freedom of Ship Ambuscade Act 1707	6 Ann. c. 7 Pr. 6 Ann. c. 12 Pr.	11 March 1708
An Act to make the Ship Ambuscade (a French Privateer taken by Her Majesty's Ship The Dover, (Note: HMS Dover) and condemned and sold as Prize) a free Ship.
Sir Henry Bond's Restitution Act 1707	6 Ann. c. 8 Pr. 6 Ann. c. 16 Pr.	20 March 1708
An Act for the Reversal of the Attainder of Sir Henry Bond Baronet, in Ireland.
Bromley's Estate Act 1707	6 Ann. c. 9 Pr. 6 Ann. c. 17 Pr.	20 March 1708
An Act for making effectual the Provision intended by Will'm Bromley, late of Holt Castle, in the County of Worcester, Esquire, for Dorothy Bromley his Youngest Daughter.
Stephens' Estate Act 1707	6 Ann. c. 10 Pr. 6 Ann. c. 18 Pr.	20 March 1708
An Act for selling the Estate of Thomas Stephens Esquire, in the Counties of Chester and Stafford; and for settling of another Estate, of as great or greater Value, in the County of Gloucester, to the same Uses.
Tuckfield's Estate Act 1707	6 Ann. c. 11 Pr. 6 Ann. c. 19 Pr.	20 March 1708
An Act for vesting in Roger Tuckfield Esquire several Lands purchased for him by Sir William Davye Baronet, deceased.
Freedom of Russian-Built Ships Act 1707	6 Ann. c. 12 Pr. 6 Ann. c. 20 Pr.	20 March 1708
An Act for making Two large Fly Boats (Russia-built) one called The Thomas and Henry, the other The Richard and Jane, free Ships, to trade to Russia.
Naturalizing des Maizeaux, Heilman, Risteau, Bouvot and Others Act 1707	6 Ann. c. 13 Pr. 6 Ann. c. 21 Pr.	20 March 1708
An Act for naturalizing Peter des Maizeaux, Francis Heilman, John Risteau, Peter Bouvot, and others.
Binden Estate etc. Act 1707	6 Ann. c. 14 Pr. 6 Ann. c. 22 Pr.	1 April 1708
An Act to enable the Right Honourable the Countess of Bindon, together with the Right Honourable Henry Earl of Bindon her now Husband, to make Leases of the Manor and Town of Carlowe, in the County of Catherlagh and Queen's County, in the Kingdom of Ireland; and for the evidencing of the Settlements made by Henry late Earl of Thomond.
Lenthall's Estate Act 1707	6 Ann. c. 15 Pr. 6 Ann. c. 23 Pr.	1 April 1708
An Act for vesting the Equity of Redemption of the Manor and Capital Messuage of Great Haseley, with the Appurtenances, and divers Messuages, Farms, and Lands, in Haseley and Latchford, in the County of Oxford; late the Estate of William Lenthall Esquire deceased, (in Trustees) to be sold, for discharging of Incumbrances thereupon.
Boyd's Estate Act 1707	6 Ann. c. 16 Pr. 6 Ann. c. 24 Pr.	1 April 1708
An Act for vesting several Messuages, Houses, Lands, and Tenements, in the County of Dublin, in the Kingdom of Ireland, formerly the Estate of Thomas Boyd Esquire, in a Trustee, to be sold, for the Payment of the Debts of Lettice late Countess of Kilmarnock, deceased, and for raising Portions for the Younger Children of the said Countess.
Cheeke's Estate Act 1707	6 Ann. c. 17 Pr. 6 Ann. c. 25 Pr.	1 April 1708
An Act to vest the Estate late of Edward Cheeke Esquire, deceased, in Somersetshire, remaining unfold at his Death, in Trustees, to be sold, to satisfy the Demands of the Lady Russell his Mother, and Essex Cheeke his Sister; and to vest the Remainder of the Monies arising by Sale of the said Estate in the Purchase of other Lands, to be settled on Edward Cheeke, an Infant, and his Heirs.
Wyndham's Estate Act 1707	6 Ann. c. 18 Pr. 6 Ann. c. 26 Pr.	1 April 1708
An Act to enable Sir William Windham, of Orchard Windham, in the County of Somerset, Baroner, to make a Marriage Settlement, and for other Purposes therein mentioned, during his Minority.
Sir John Wentworth and Brothers Jointures Act 1707	6 Ann. c. 19 Pr. 6 Ann. c. 27 Pr.	1 April 1708
An Act for explaining and amending a Proviso and Power, for enabling Sir John Wentworth Baronet, and his Brothers, to make a Wife a Jointure.
Sir Ralph Milbank Jointure and Settlement Act 1707	6 Ann. c. 20 Pr. 6 Ann. c. 28 Pr.	1 April 1708
An Act to enable Sir Ralph Milbanke Baronet to make a Jointure and Settlement upon such Woman as he shall marry, as if he were of full Age.
Lister's Estate Act 1707	6 Ann. c. 21 Pr. 6 Ann. c. 29 Pr.	1 April 1708
An Act for Sale of the Manor of Swinden, and several Messuages, Lands, and Hereditaments, in the County of York, late Part of the Estate of Christopher Lister Esquire, and after of Thomas Lister Esquire, both deceased, for Payment of the Legacies and Debts of the said Christopher Lister, and a Mortgage of the said Thomas Lister's.
Richard Parke's Debt Act 1707	6 Ann. c. 22 Pr. 6 Ann. c. 30 Pr.	1 April 1708
An Act to empower the Lord High Treasurer of Great Britain, or Commissioners of the Treasury, to compound with Richard Parke, Citizen and late Merchant of London, for a Debt due to Her Majesty.
Killingworth's Estate Act 1707	6 Ann. c. 23 Pr. 6 Ann. c. 31 Pr.	1 April 1708
An Act for the Sale of a Piece of Ground, late of John Killingworth Esquire deceased, on which stood several old and decayed Tenements; and applying the Purchase-money for the Benefit of his Wife and Daughters.
Mayne's Estate Act 1707	6 Ann. c. 24 Pr. 6 Ann. c. 32 Pr.	1 April 1708
An Act for vacating the Settlement made upon the Marriage of Henry Mayne, and for making a reasonable Provision for the Maintenance of his only Son (who is an Idiot) during his Life.
Hamilton's Estate Act 1707	6 Ann. c. 25 Pr. 6 Ann. c. 33 Pr.	1 April 1708
An Act for Sale of Part of the Estate of James Hamilton Esquire, deceased.
Relief of Colonel Richard Sutton and other Aides de Camp Act 1707	6 Ann. c. 26 Pr. 6 Ann. c. 34 Pr.	1 April 1708
An Act for the Relief of Colonel Richard Sutton, and other Aids de Camp.
Relief of Captain James Roch Act 1707	6 Ann. c. 27 Pr. 6 Ann. c. 35 Pr.	1 April 1708
An Act for the Relief of Captain James Roch.
Relief of Lieutenant Colonel John Savery Act 1707	6 Ann. c. 28 Pr. 6 Ann. c. 36 Pr.	1 April 1708
An Act for the Relief of Lieutenant Colonel John Savery.
Naturalizing John Affleck and Mary Dutry Act 1707	6 Ann. c. 29 Pr. 6 Ann. c. 37 Pr.	1 April 1708
An Act for naturalizing John Affleck Esquire and Mary Dutry.
Naturalizing Peter Dubourdieu and Others Act 1707	6 Ann. c. 30 Pr. Ruffhead c. 38 Pr.	1 April 1708
An Act for naturalizing Peter Dubourdieu and others.

=== Sources ===
- Raithby, John, ed. (1821). "Anno 6° Annæ, A.D. 1706". The Statutes of the Realm. Vol. 8: The Statutes of the First to the Sixth Year of the Reign of Queen Anne. pp. 637–852 – via Internet Archive.
- Raithby, John, ed. (1963) [1821]. "6° Annæ". Statutes of the Realm. Vol. 8: The Statutes of the First to the Sixth Years of the Reign of Queen Anne (1702–1707). London: Dawsons. pp. 637–852 – via HathiTrust.
- Pickering, Danby, ed. (1764). "Anno sexto Annæ". The Statutes at Large. Vol. 11: From The Second to the Eighth Year of Queen Anne. Cambridge: Joseph Bentham. pp. 290–443 – via Internet Archive.
- Pickering, Danby, ed. (1764). "Anno sexto Annæ". The Statutes at Large. Vol. 11: From The Second to the Eighth Year of Queen Anne. Cambridge: Joseph Bentham. pp. 290–443 – via Internet Archive (alternative digitisation).
- Pickering, Danby, ed. (1764). "Anno sexto Annæ". The Statutes at Large. Vol. 11: From The Second to the Eighth Year of Queen Anne. Cambridge: Joseph Bentham. pp. 290–443 – via Google Books.
- Ruffhead, Owen, ed. (1753). "Anno sexto Annæ Reginæ". The Statutes at Large. Vol. 4: From the Tenth Year of King William III to the End of the Reign of Queen Anne. London. pp. 268–338 – via Internet Archive.
- "6 Anne". The Statutes: Revised Edition. Vol. 2: William & Mary to 10 George III: 1688 – 1770. London: Eyre and Spottiswoode. 1871. pp. 155–195 – via Internet Archive.
- "6 Anne". The Statutes: Revised Edition. Vol. 2: William & Mary to 10 George III: 1688 – 1770. London: Eyre and Spottiswoode. 1871. pp. 155–195 – via Google Books.
- Journals of the House of Commons. Vol. 15. London: His Majesty's Stationery Office. 1803. pp. 393–650 – via Google Books.
- Journal of the House of Lords. Vol. 18: 1705-1709. London: His Majesty's Stationery Office. 1830. pp. 330–571 – via British History Online.
- Chronological Table of and Index to the Statutes. Vol. 1: To the End of the Session 59 Vict. Sess. 2 (1895) (13th ed.). London: Her Majesty's Stationery Office. 1896. pp. 86–88 – via Google Books.
- Chronological Table of the Statutes: Covering the Period from 1235 to the End of 1971. London: Her Majesty's Stationery Office. 1972. pp. 83–85. ISBN 978-0-11-840096-1 – via Google Books.
- "Acts of the Parliament of Great Britain from 1707". legislation.gov.uk. The National Archives.

== See also ==
- List of acts of the Parliament of Great Britain
