= George Archibald, 1st Baron Archibald =

George Archibald, 1st Baron Archibald CBE (21 July 1898 – 25 February 1975) was a British Labour politician.

== Early life ==
Archibald was the son of George W. Archibald, of Glasgow, and was educated at St George's Road Elementary School and Alan Glen's High School.

== Career ==
He fought Birmingham Sparkbrook as the Labour candidate in 1931, but was heavily defeated by Leo Amery in the Conservative landslide of that year.

During the Second World War he served as Controller of the Ministry of Information from 1944 to 1945. In 1949 he was raised to the peerage by the Labour government of Clement Attlee as Baron Archibald, of Woodside in the City of Glasgow. He served under Attlee as Captain of the Yeomen of the Guard (Deputy Chief Whip in the House of Lords) from June to October 1951. He was later Chairman of the Federation of British Film Makers from 1957 to 1966 and Deputy President of Film Production of Great Britain from 1966 to 1968.

== Personal life ==
Lord Archibald married firstly Dorothy, daughter of George Henry Edwards, in 1926. She died in 1960. He married secondly Catherine Edith Mary, daughter of former Prime Minister of the United Kingdom Bonar Law and former wife of Kent Colwell, in 1961.

Archibald died in February 1975, aged 76. He was succeeded in the barony by his son from his first marriage, George Christopher Archibald, who, however, disclaimed the peerage for life only a few days later. Lady Archibald died in 1992.

Political offices
Preceded by The Earl of Lucan	Captain of the Yeomen of the Guard; 1951	Succeeded by The Earl of Onslow
Peerage of the United Kingdom
New creation	Baron Archibald; 1949–1975	Succeeded by George Christopher Archibald (disclaimed 1975)
