= Liliana Archibald =

Lloyds insurance broker

Liliana Archibald OBE
- Born: Liliana Leah Kalmanowsky; 25 May 1928; Marylebone, London, United Kingdom
- Died: 1 June 2014 (aged 86); Hampstead, London, England
- Education: University of Geneva
- Occupations: Insurance broker; Lecturer; Translator
- Years active: 1952–1992
- Employer: Lloyd's of London
- Spouse: George Christopher Archibald (m. 1951; div. 1965)

Liliana Leah Archibald OBE (née Kalmanowsky, later Barou; 25 May 1928 – 1 June 2014) was an English insurance broker for Lloyd's of London. She began her career as an economics lecturer at the University of Otago and translated books on the history of Russia. Archibald began her finance career in 1955 with her stepfather's firm, Moscow Narodny Bank, and became Lloyd's first accredited women insurance broker in 1973. She worked to harmonize the EEC's member states differing export credit systems from Brussels as chief of the Division for Credit Insurance and Export Credit of the European Commission. Archibald also served on several government bodies and committees, and was Lloyd's EEC adviser.

== Biography ==
=== Early life ===
Archibald was born to Russian Jewish immigrants Emanuel Eshuah Kalmanowsky and his wife, Sophie (née Gissen), at the Welbeck Hospital in Marylebone, London on 25 May 1928. Her father was a civil engineer and company director who abandoned the family soon after she was born. Archibald had an older brother, Alexander. Her mother later married family friend Noah Barou, the head of London-based Moscow Narodny Bank, and Liliana took on his surname. In 1935, she began to be taught at Kingsley Lodge School for Girls in Belsize Park, which was evacuated to Tintagel, Cornwall when the Second World War broke out in 1935, remaining there until the war ended. Archibald learnt how to hand-milk cows during her time at the school. She left the school in 1947, and took courses in History, Literature, and Philosophy at the University of Geneva from 1947 to 1949, and also worked as a translator for the United Nations.

=== Career ===
In 1952, Archibald moved to New Zealand and was appointed economics lecturer of the University of Otago and tutored in Russian history. She translated the fourth edition of Vasily Klyuchevsky's History of Russia and edited and translated its third volume. Archibald returned to the United Kingdom in 1955 to join her stepfather's firm as a specialist in providing banks with credit insurance, claiming salaries for a career in academia were too low. In 1957, she was appointed a director of Credit Consultants and joined the sole contingency brokers to provide overseas clients with contingency insurance, Adam Brothers Contingency. Archibald was appointed director of Adam Brothers Contingency in 1970.

Following the recommendation of the 1968 Cromer Report, Lloyd's of London lifted a restriction on women brokers, leading her Adam Brothers colleagues to encourage her to apply for a job there. Archibald's application was successful and she was accredited as an insurance broker on 1 January 1973, making her Lloyd's first female such broker. Of her appointment, she said "I did not break down the barriers; they were broken down for me by the members of Lloyd’s in a very charming way." Being one of the 1970s top women earners in the United Kingdom, In May 1973, Archibald was made chief of the Division for Credit Insurance and Export Credit of the European Commission and directorate-general for External Relations, Commission of the European Communities. She worked to harmonize all the EEC member states different export credit insurance systems from Brussels until 1977 when Lloyd's made her its EEC adviser, with appearances on Question Time on the BBC after the Thatcher government sought to bring about incentives to encourage the sale of British goods and services abroad.

Archibald became Lloyd's international affairs advisor in 1981 and left Adam Brothers as a director four years later to become its chairperson from 1991 to 1992. She served on the British Export Finance Advisory Council, the committee on the Review of Banking Services Law and the Lord Chancellor's Advisory Committee on Legal Education and Conduct. Between 1984 and 1985, Archibald was part of a government inquiry to look into trading on Sundays, which recommended expanding trading hours on Sundays. In February 1989, she was part of a committee that published a review of the law relating to banking mechanisms and practices, making 83 recommendations to the government related to the bills of exchange for denomination in units of account that were accepted.

== Personal life ==
From 19 October 1951 to 1965, she was married to the economist George Christopher Archibald. The union was childless. Archibald was appointed the OBE.

On 1 June 2014, she died of a ruptured aortic aneurysm at age 86 in Hampstead, London.

== Personality and legacy ==
Archibald's obituary in The Times noted much comment was made of her love of Porsche's at high speed, wearing a black leather jacket and smoking cigarillo. Rosie Quigley of Post Magazine wrote of her legacy the insurance broker "could be seen as having kick-started a host of new women into Lloyd’s."
