= Peerage Act 1963 =

Act of the Parliament of the United Kingdom

Peerage Act 1963 (Note: Section 7(1).)
- Act of Parliament
- Parliament of the United Kingdom
- Long title: An Act to authorise the disclaimer for life of certain hereditary peerages; to include among the peers qualified to sit in the House of Lords all peers in the peerage of Scotland and peeresses in their own right in the peerages of England, Scotland, Great Britain and the United Kingdom; to remove certain disqualifications of peers in the peerage of Ireland in relation to the House of Commons and elections thereto; and for purposes connected with the matters aforesaid.
- Citation: 1963 c. 48
- Territorial extent: United Kingdom

Dates
- Royal assent: 31 July 1963
- Commencement: 31 July 1963 (Note: The Acts of Parliament (Commencement) Act 1793.)
Other legislation
Amends	See § Repealed enactments
Repeals/revokes	See § Repealed enactments
Amended by	Statute Law (Repeals) Act 1974; House of Lords Act 1999; House of Lords (Hereditary Peers) Act 2026

Status: Amended

Text of statute as originally enacted

Revised text of statute as amended

Text of the Peerage Act 1963 as in force today (including any amendments) within the United Kingdom, from legislation.gov.uk.

The Peerage Act 1963 (c. 48) is an act of the Parliament of the United Kingdom that permits female hereditary peers and all Scottish hereditary peers to sit in the House of Lords and allows newly inherited hereditary peerages to be disclaimed.

A disclaimed peerage remains without a holder until the death of the disclaimer, and his heir succeeds to the peerage.

== Background ==
The act resulted largely from the protests of the Labour politician Tony Benn, then the 2nd Viscount Stansgate. Under British law at the time, peers of England, peers of Great Britain and peers of the United Kingdom who met certain qualifications, such as age (21), were automatically members of the House of Lords and could not sit in or vote in elections for the lower chamber, the House of Commons.

At the time of the act, thirty-one peers in the peerage of Scotland also had held titles in the respective peerages of England, Great Britain and the United Kingdom and were thus members of the Lords.

When William Wedgwood Benn, Benn's father, agreed to accept the viscountcy, he ascertained that the heir apparent, his eldest son, Michael, did not plan to enter the Commons. However, within a few years of the peerage being accepted, Michael was killed in action in the Second World War. Tony, his younger brother, became heir apparent to the peerage and was elected to the Commons at the 1950 general election. Not wishing to leave it for the other House, he campaigned through the 1950s for a change in the law. In 1960 the 1st Viscount died and Tony inherited the title, automatically losing his seat in the Commons as the member of Parliament for Bristol South East. In the ensuing by-election, however, Benn was returned to the Commons, despite being disqualified. An election court subsequently ruled that he could not take his seat, instead awarding it to the runner-up, the Conservative Party candidate, Malcolm St Clair.

In 1963 the Conservative government agreed to introduce a Peerage Bill, allowing individuals to disclaim peerages; it received royal assent on 31 July 1963. Tony Benn was the first peer to make use of the act. St Clair, fulfilling a promise he had made at the time of taking his seat, accepted the office of Steward of the Manor of Northstead the previous day, thereby disqualifying himself from the House (outright resignation is prohibited), and Benn was then re-elected in Bristol South East at the ensuing by-election.

== Disclaiming peerages ==
To disclaim a hereditary peerage, the peer must deliver an instrument of disclaimer to the Lord Chancellor within one year of succeeding to the peerage, or within one year after the passage of the act, or, if under the age of 21 at the time of succession, before the peer's 22nd birthday. If, at the time of succession, the peer is a member of the House of Commons, then the instrument must be delivered within one month of succession, and until such an instrument is delivered, the peer may neither sit nor vote in the lower House. Prior to the House of Lords Act 1999, a hereditary peer could not disclaim a peerage after having applied for a writ of summons to Parliament; now, however, hereditary peers do not have the automatic right to a writ of summons to the House. A peer who disclaims the peerage loses all titles, rights and privileges associated with the peerage; if they are married, so does their spouse. No further hereditary peerage may be conferred upon the person, but a life peerage may be. The peerage remains without a holder until the death of the peer who had made the disclaimer, whereupon it descends to his or her heir in the usual manner.

The one-year window after the passage of the act soon proved to be of importance at the highest levels of British politics, after the resignation of Harold Macmillan as prime minister in October 1963. Two hereditary peers wished to be considered to replace him, but by this time it was considered requisite for a prime minister to sit in the Commons. Quintin Hogg, 2nd Viscount Hailsham, and Alec Douglas-Home, 14th Earl of Home, took advantage of the act to disclaim their peerages, despite having inherited them in 1950 and 1951 respectively. Sir Alec Douglas-Home, as Lord Home now became, was chosen as prime minister; both men later returned to the Lords as life peers. The only other political use of it was in 1994 when the Conservative MP James Douglas-Hamilton inherited the Earldom of Selkirk. He felt obliged to disclaim his peerage immediately in order to continue be able to vote due to the government having a small majority. He was given a life peerage after losing his seat in 1997.

Since the abolition in 1999 of the general right of hereditary peers to sit in the House of Lords, and the consequent removal of the general disability of such peers to sit in or vote for the Commons, it is no longer necessary for hereditary peers to disclaim their peerages for this purpose. In 2001 John Thurso, 3rd Viscount Thurso, became the first British hereditary peer to be elected to the Commons and take his seat. Later that year, Douglas Hogg inherited the Hailsham peerage his father, Quintin Hogg, had disclaimed, but did not have to disclaim it himself to continue sitting in the Commons. In 2004 Michael Ancram inherited the marquessate of Lothian on the death of his father, and was also able to continue sitting as an MP. On their retirements from the Commons, Lord Lothian and Lord Hailsham entered the Lords as life peers, while Lord Thurso was elected as an excepted hereditary peer after losing re-election as an MP. Since the chief purpose for the act ended in 1999, there has only been one further disclaimer: Christopher Silkin, 3rd Baron Silkin, disclaimed his title in 2002. As at 2024 the barony of Silkin is the only title currently disclaimed under the terms of the Peerage Act 1963.

The Peerage Act 1963 only applies to titles held in the peerage of England, the peerage of Scotland, the peerage of Great Britain and the peerage of the United Kingdom. No provision was made by the act for titles in the peerage of Ireland to be disclaimed, as the entitlement of new Irish representative peers to be elected to sit in the Lords was considered to have lapsed after most of Ireland became independent as the Irish Free State in December 1922 (and the last surviving Irish representative peer had died in 1961).

== List of disclaimed peerages ==
Key
‡	Indicates peerage which is currently disclaimed

Title(s)		Disclaimed by; life	Time disclaimed	Notes	Ref.
Viscount Stansgate	(Note: The title in the Peerage of the United Kingdom.)	Tony Benn; 2nd Viscount; 1925–2014	1963 to 2014	Extant; inherited in 2014 by Stephen Benn, 3rd Viscount Stansgate	
Baron Altrincham		John Grigg; 2nd Baron; 1924–2001	1963 to 2001	Extant; inherited in 2001 by Anthony Grigg, 3rd Baron Altrincham	
Earl of Home	(Note: The title in the Peerage of Scotland.)	Sir Alec Douglas-Home; 14th Earl; 1903–1995 (Note: Created as a life peer as Baron Home of the Hirsel, 1974.)	1963 to 1995	Extant; inherited in 1995 by David Douglas-Home, 15th Earl of Home	
Viscount Hailsham		Quintin Hogg; 2nd Viscount; 1907–2001 (Note: Created as a life peer as Baron Hailsham of St Marylebone, 1970.)	1963 to 2001	Extant; inherited in 2001 by Douglas Hogg, 3rd Viscount Hailsham	
Baron Southampton	(Note: The title in the Peerage of Great Britain.)	Charles FitzRoy; 5th Baron; 1904–1989	1964 to 1989	Extant; inherited in 1989 by Charles FitzRoy, 6th Baron Southampton	
Baron Monkswell		William Collier; 4th Baron; 1913–1984	1964 to 1984	Extant; inherited in 1984 by Gerard Collier, 5th Baron Monkswell	
Baron Beaverbrook		Sir Max Aitken, 2nd Baronet; 2nd Baron; 1910–1985	1964 to 1985	Extant; inherited in 1985 by Maxwell Aitken, 3rd Baron Beaverbrook	
Earl of Sandwich	(Note: The title in the Peerage of England.)	Victor Montagu; 10th Earl; 1906–1995	1964 to 1995	Extant; inherited in 1995 by John Montagu, 11th Earl of Sandwich	
Baron Fraser of Allander		Sir Hugh Fraser, Bt. 2nd Baron; 1936–1987	1966 to 1987	Extinct 1987	
Earl of Durham		Antony Lambton; 6th Earl; 1922–2006	1970 to 2006	Extant; inherited in 2006 by Edward Lambton, 7th Earl of Durham	
Baron Sanderson of Ayot		Alan Lindsay Sanderson; 2nd Baron; 1931–2022	1971 to 2022	Extant; inherited in 2022 by Michael Sanderson, 3rd Baron Sanderson of Ayot	
Baron Reith		Christopher Reith; 2nd Baron; 1928–2016	1972 to 2016	Extant; inherited in 2016 by James Reith, 3rd Baron Reith	
Baron Silkin		Arthur Silkin; 2nd Baron; 1916–2001	1972 to 2001	Inherited in 2001 by Christopher Silkin, 3rd Baron Silkin, who also disclaimed the peerage: now the only peerage to be disclaimed twice	
Baron Archibald		George Christopher Archibald; 2nd Baron; 1926–1996	1975 to 1996	Extinct 1996	
Baron Merthyr		Trevor Lewis; 4th Baron; 1935–2015	1977 to 2015	Extant; inherited in 2015 by David Lewis, 5th Baron Merthyr	
Earl of Selkirk		Lord James Douglas-Hamilton; 11th Earl; 1942–2023 (Note: Created as a life peer as Baron Selkirk of Douglas, 1997.)	1994 to 2023	Extant; inherited in 2023 by John Douglas-Hamilton, 12th Earl of Selkirk	
Viscount Camrose		Michael Berry; 3rd Viscount; 1911–2001 (Note: Created as a life peer as Baron Hartwell, 1968.)	1995 to 2001	Extant; inherited in 2001 by Adrian Berry, 4th Viscount Camrose	
‡ Baron Silkin		Christopher Silkin; 3rd Baron born 1947	Since 2002		

== Other provisions ==
The act granted peers of Scotland the same right to sit in the House of Lords as peers of England, Great Britain or the United Kingdom, thereby ending the election of Scottish representative peers and increasing the number of peers of Scotland in the Lords (who did not already sit as holder of another British peerage) from 16 to about 46. An amendment that would have allowed Irish peers to sit in the House as well was defeated by ninety votes to eight.

The act removed the disqualification of peers of Ireland, by virtue of an Irish peerage, to vote in elections for members of the House of Commons; and to sit in the British House of Commons without losing the privilege of peerage.

The act also granted suo jure hereditary women peers (other than those in the Peerage of Ireland) the right to sit in the House of Lords, which introduced twelve new women to the House. This was not the first time that women were members of the House of Lords; the Life Peerages Act 1958 allowed all life peers (men and women) to sit in the House. Irene Curzon, 2nd Baroness Ravensdale had already entered the Lords in 1958 through the receipt of a life peerage. The women who took their seats in the House after the Peerage Act 1963 and before the House of Lords Act 1999 were:

=== Scottish hereditary peers ===
Peer	Highest qualifying title		Notes
Douglas Douglas-Hamilton, 14th Duke of Hamilton	Duke of Brandon	(Note: The title in the Peerage of Great Britain.)	The incumbent Lord Steward.
Walter Montagu Douglas Scott, 8th Duke of Buccleuch and 10th Duke of Queensbury	Earl of Doncaster	(Note: The title in the Peerage of England.)	The incumbent Lord Clerk Register.
Ian Campbell, 11th Duke of Argyll	Duke of Argyll	(Note: The title in the Peerage of the United Kingdom.) (Note: Junior qualifying title, Baron Sundridge and Baron Hamilton of Hameldon .)	
Angus Graham, 7th Duke of Montrose	Earl Graham of Belford		The incumbent Cabinet Minister in Southern Rhodesia.
George Innes-Ker, 9th Duke of Roxburghe	Earl Innes		
Douglas Gordon, 12th Marquess of Huntly	Baron Meldrum		
William Hay, 11th Marquess of Tweeddale	Baron Tweeddale		The incumbent Lord Lieutenant of East Lothian
Peter Kerr, 12th Marquess of Lothian	Baron Ker of Kersehugh		The incumbent Lord-in-waiting
David Lindsay, 28th Earl of Crawford and 11th Earl of Balcarres	Baron Wigan		
Donald Erskine, 16th Earl of Buchan	Baron Erskine		
Archibald Montgomerie, 17th Earl of Eglinton	Earl of Winton		
Archibald Stuart, 19th Earl of Moray	Baron Stuart	(Note: Junior qualifying title, Baron Ardrossan .)	
Alec Douglas-Home, 14th Earl of Home	Baron Douglas		The incumbent Foreign Secretary
Timothy Bowes-Lyon, 16th Earl of Strathmore and Kinghorne	Earl of Strathmore and Kinghorne	(Note: Junior qualifying title, Baron Bowes .)	
Randolph Stewart, 12th Earl of Galloway	Baron Stewart of Garlies		The incumbent Lord Lieutenant of Kirkcudbright
William Hay, 15th Earl of Kinnoull	Baron Hay of Pedwardine		
Edward Bruce, 10th Earl of Elgin and 14th Earl of Kincardine	Baron Elgin		The incumbent Lord Lieutenant of Fife
Charles Carnegie, 11th Earl of Southesk	Baron Balinhard		
David Charteris, 12th Earl of Wemyss and 8th Earl of March	Baron Wemyss		
Simon Ramsay, 16th Earl of Dalhousie	Baron Ramsay		
Henry Scrymgeour-Wedderburn, 11th Earl of Dundee	Baron Glassary		
Arthur Keith-Falconer, 10th Earl of Kintore (Note: The Barony of Kintore in the Peerage of the United Kingdom was extinct on 26 May 1966)	Baron Kintore		
John Murray, 9th Earl of Dunmore (Note: The Barony of Dunmore in the Peerage of the United Kingdom was extinct on 12 August 1980)	Baron Dunmore		
John Dalrymple, 13th Earl of Stair	Baron Oxenfoord		The incumbent Lord Lieutenant of Wigtown
Harry Primrose, 6th Earl of Rosebery	Earl of Midlothian	(Note: Junior qualifying title, Baron Rosebery .)	The incumbent Lord Lieutenant of Midlothian
Patrick Boyle, 8th Earl of Glasgow	Baron Fairlie		
Simon Fraser, 15th Lord Lovat	Baron Lovat		
John Elphinstone, 17th Lord Elphinstone	Baron Elphinstone		
Nigel Napier, 14th Lord Napier	Baron Ettrick		
Eric Rollo, 13th Lord Rollo	Baron Dunning		
Kenneth Kinnaird, 12th Lord Kinnaird (Note: The Lordship of Kinnaird in the Peerage of Scotland and Barony of Kinnaird in the Peerage of the United Kingdom was extinct on 27 February 1997)	Baron Kinnaird		

==== Scottish representative peers who became automatic members ====
Peer	Elected as representative peer	Notes
Iain Murray, 10th Duke of Atholl	1 October 1958	
Roderick Sinclair, 19th Earl of Caithness	21 February 1950	
John Erskine, 13th Earl of Mar and 16th Earl of Kellie	6 October 1959	
David Drummond, 8th Earl of Perth	2 April 1952	
George Baillie-Hamilton, 12th Earl of Haddington	16 November 1922	
David Ogilvy, 12th Earl of Airlie	13 January 1922	
George Douglas-Hamilton, 10th Earl of Selkirk	6 July 1945	
David Carnegie, 11th Earl of Northesk	6 October 1959	
Ian Cochrane, 14th Earl of Dundonald	6 October 1959	
Nigel Forbes, 22nd Lord Forbes	23 May 1955	
Alexander Fraser, 20th Lord Saltoun	15 November 1935	
Charles St Clair, 17th Lord Sinclair	6 October 1959	
William Forbes-Sempill, 19th Lord Sempill	15 November 1935	
George Bruce, 7th Lord Balfour of Burleigh	16 November 1922	
Thomas Fairfax, 13th Lord Fairfax of Cameron	6 July 1945	
Henry Hepburne-Scott, 10th Lord Polwarth	6 July 1945	

==== Became eligible to sit ====
Peer	Notes
David Douglas, 12th Marquess of Queensberry	
Lionel Erskine-Young, 29th Earl of Mar	
Sholto Douglas, 20th Earl of Morton	
Malcolm Leslie, 20th Earl of Rothes	Former representative peer
Alfred Maitland, 16th Earl of Lauderdale	
William Lindesay-Bethune, 14th Earl of Lindsay	Former representative peer
Alexander Leslie-Melville, 14th Earl of Leven and 13th Earl of Melville	
John Campbell, 10th Earl of Breadalbane and Holland	
Cecil FitzMaurice, 8th Earl of Orkney	
Lucius Cary, 14th Viscount Falkland	
Keith Arbuthnott, 15th Viscount of Arbuthnott	
Angus Campbell-Gray, 22nd Lord Gray	
John Sandilands, 13th Lord Torphichen	
Hugh Mackay, 14th Lord Reay	
James Erskine-Murray, 13th Lord Elibank	
Robert Hamilton, 13th Lord Belhaven and Stenton	

The holder of the Earldom of Newburgh wasn't eligible as she was an Italian citizen.

=== Irish hereditary peers ===
==== Irish peers with qualifying titles ====
Peer	Highest qualifying title	
Edward FitzGerald, 7th Duke of Leinster	Viscount Leinster	(Note: The title in the Peerage of Great Britain.) (Note: Junior qualifying title, Baron Kildare (Note: The title in the Peerage of the United Kingdom.))
James Hamilton, 4th Duke of Abercorn	Marquess of Abercorn	(Note: Junior qualifying title, Viscount Hamilton .)
John Beresford, 8th Marquess of Waterford	Baron Tyrone	
Arthur Hill, 7th Marquess of Downshire	Earl of Hillsborough	(Note: Junior qualifying title, Baron Harwich .)
Edward Chichester, 6th Marquess of Donegall	Baron Fisherwick	
Michael Taylour, 6th Marquess of Headfort	Baron Kenlis	
Denis Browne, 10th Marquess of Sligo	Baron Monteagle	
George Loftus, 7th Marquess of Ely	Baron Loftus	
Frederick Conyngham, 6th Marquess Conyngham	Baron Minster	
Alistair Vane-Tempest-Stewart, 9th Marquess of Londonderry	Earl Vane	(Note: Junior qualifying title, Baron Stewart .)
Arthur Butler, 6th Marquess of Ormonde (Note: The Marquessate of Ormonde in the Peerage of Ireland and the Barony of Ormonde was extinct on 25 October 1997)	Baron Ormonde	
William Boyle, 12th Earl of Cork and 12th Earl of Orrery	Baron Boyle of Marston	
Anthony Brabazon, 14th Earl of Meath	Baron Chaworth	
Oliver Plunket, 12th Earl of Fingall (Note: The Earldom of Fingall in the Peerage of Ireland and the Barony of Fingall in the Peerage of the United Kingdom was extinct on 5 March 1984)	Baron Fingall	
Charles Moore, 11th Earl of Drogheda	Baron Moore	
Arthur Forbes, 9th Earl of Granard	Baron Granard	
Thomas Wentworth-Fitzwilliam, 10th Earl Fitzwilliam (Note: The Earldom of Fitzwilliam in the Peerage of Ireland, the Earldom of Fitzwilliam and the Barony of Fitzwilliam in the Peerage of Great Britain was extinct on 21 September 1979)	Earl Fitzwilliam	(Note: Junior qualifying title, Baron Fitzwilliam .)
Peter Bligh, 10th Earl of Darnley	Baron Clifton	(Note: The title in the Peerage of England.)
Frederick Perceval, 11th Earl of Egmont (Note: The Earldom of Egmont in the Peerage of Ireland and the Barony of Lovel and Holland in the Peerage of Great Britain was extinct on 6 November 2011)	Baron Lovel and Holland	
Frederick Ponsonby, 10th Earl of Bessborough (Note: The Earldom of Bessborough in the Peerage of the United Kingdom was extinct on 5 December 1993)	Earl of Bessborough	(Note: Junior qualifying title, Baron Ponsonby of Sysonby and Baron Duncannon .)
Brian Butler, 9th Earl of Carrick	Baron Butler of Mount Juliet	
Robert Boyle, 8th Earl of Shannon	Baron Carleton	
Arthur Gore, 8th Earl of Arran	Baron Sudley	
James Stopford, 8th Earl of Courtown	Baron Saltersford	
Hugh Molyneux, 7th Earl of Sefton (Note: The Earldom of Sefton in the Peerage of Ireland and the Barony of Sefton in the Peerage of the United Kingdom was extinct on 13 April 1972)	Baron Sefton	
John Meade, 6th Earl of Clanwilliam	Baron Clanwilliam	
Frank Pakenham, 7th Earl of Longford	Baron Silchester	(Note: Junior qualifying title, Baron Pakenham .)
David Cole, 6th Earl of Enniskillen	Baron Grinstead	
Henry Crichton, 6th Earl Erne	Baron Fermanagh	
George Bingham, 6th Earl of Lucan	Baron Bingham	
John Hely-Hutchinson, 7th Earl of Donoughmore	Viscount Hutchinson	
Edmund Pery, 5th Earl of Limerick	Baron Foxford	
Richard Trench, 6th Earl of Clancarty	Viscount Clancarty	(Note: Junior qualifying title, Baron Trench .)
Archibald Acheson, 6th Earl of Gosford	Baron Worlingham	(Note: Junior qualifying title, Baron Acheson .)
Edward Ellis Agar, 5th Earl of Normanton	Baron Somerton	
William Hare, 5th Earl of Listowel	Baron Hare	
Daniel Knox, 6th Earl of Ranfurly	Baron Ranfurly	
Nicholas Preston, 17th Viscount Gormanston	Baron Gormanston	
Piers Butler, 16th Viscount Mountgarret	Baron Mountgarret	
John Whyte-Melville-Skeffington, 13th Viscount Massereene and 6th Viscount Ferrard	Baron Oriel	
Richard Dawnay, 10th Viscount Downe	Baron Dawnay	
Gustavus Hamilton-Russell, 10th Viscount Boyne	Baron Brancepeth	
Patrick Barrington, 11th Viscount Barrington (Note: The Viscountcy of Barrington in the Peerage of Ireland and the Barony of Shute in the Peerage of the United Kingdom was extinct on 6 April 1990)	Baron Shute	
Henry Gage, 6th Viscount Gage	Baron Gage	
Simon Monckton-Arundell, 9th Viscount Galway (Note: The Barony of Monckton in the Peerage of the United Kingdom was extinct on 1 January 1971)	Baron Monckton	
Mervyn Patrick Wingfield, 9th Viscount Powerscourt	Baron Powerscourt	
Francis Agar-Robartes, 7th Viscount Clifden (Note: The Viscountcy of Clifden in the Peerage of Ireland and the Barony of Robartes in the Peerage of the United Kingdom was extinct on 22 December 1974)	Baron Mendip	(Note: Junior qualifying title, Baron Robartes .)
Henry Monck, 6th Viscount Monck	Baron Monck	
Edward Digby, 11th Baron Digby	Baron Digby	
William Edwardes, 7th Baron Kensington	Baron Kensington	
Edward Stanley, 6th Baron Sheffield	Baron Stanley of Alderley	(Note: Junior qualifying title, Baron Eddisbury .)
William Westenra, 7th Baron Rossmore	Baron Rossmore	
Michael Eden, 7th Baron Henley	Baron Northington	
John Henniker-Major, 7th Baron Henniker	Baron Hartismere	
Milo Talbot, 7th Baron Talbot of Malahide (Note: The Barony of Talbot de Malahide in the Peerage of the United Kingdom was extinct on 14 April 1973)	Baron Talbot de Malahide	
William Conolly-Carew, 6th Baron Carew	Baron Carew	
Dominick Browne, 4th Baron Oranmore and Browne	Baron Mereworth	

- Ian Eden, 9th Baron Auckland and Peter Carington, 6th Baron Carrington are not counted on the list as they were both the 9th and 6th Barons of their respective Peerages in both the Peerage of Great Britain and Peerage of Ireland and their place in the order of precedence was Barons of the Peerage of Great Britain.

==== Irish peers with full voting rights ====
Key
‡	Indicates peerage whose holder is currently alive

Peer	Notes
Gilbert Charles Nugent, 12th Earl of Westmeath	
Michael Lambart, 12th Earl of Cavan	
Denis Butler, 9th Earl of Lanesborough	
John Savile, 7th Earl of Mexborough	
Ronald Turnour, 7th Earl Winterton	
Barclay King-Tenison, 11th Earl of Kingston	
Robert Jocelyn, 9th Earl of Roden	
Ernest Vaughan, 7th Earl of Lisburne	
Randal McDonnell, 8th Earl of Antrim	
‡ George Dawson-Damer, 7th Earl of Portarlington	
Terence Bourke, 10th Earl of Mayo	Stood for South Dorset in 1964
Robert Annesley, 9th Earl Annesley	
William Howard, 8th Earl of Wicklow	
‡ John Lowry-Corry, 8th Earl Belmore	
Percy Bernard, 5th Earl of Bandon	
Patrick Stuart, 8th Earl Castle Stewart	
Denis Alexander, 6th Earl of Caledon	
Michael Parsons, 6th Earl of Rosse	
Richard Wyndham-Quin, 6th Earl of Dunraven and Mount-Earl	
Patrick Needham, 5th Earl of Kilmorey	
Noel Graham-Toler, 6th Earl of Norbury	
Francis Annesley, 14th Viscount Valentia	
Michael Dillon, 20th Viscount Dillon	
Robert Caulfeild, 10th Viscount Charlemont	
Richard Molesworth, 11th Viscount Molesworth	
Adam Chetwynd, 9th Viscount Chetwynd	
Desmond Flower, 10th Viscount Ashbrook	
Pyers Southwell, 7th Viscount Southwell	
John Vesey, 6th Viscount de Vesci	
Alan Hewitt, 8th Viscount Lifford	
Edward Ward, 7th Viscount Bangor	
Richard St Leger, 9th Viscount Doneraile	
Henry Pomeroy, 9th Viscount Harberton	
Robert Maude, 8th Viscount Hawarden	
Henry Upton, 5th Viscount Templetown	
Standish Vereker, 7th Viscount Gort	
Michael de Courcy, 34th Baron Kingsale	
Randal Plunkett, 19th Baron of Dunsany	
Charles Barnewall, 19th Baron Trimlestown	
Patrick Butler, 18th Baron Dunboyne	
Otway Plunkett, 16th Baron Louth	
Donough O'Brien, 16th Baron Inchiquin	
John Evans-Freke, 10th Baron Carbery	
John Aylmer, 9th Baron Aylmer	
Barry Maxwell, 12th Baron Farnham	
John Lysaght, 7th Baron Lisle	
Robert Wynn, 6th Baron Newborough	
Alexander Macdonald, 7th Baron Macdonald	The incumbent Lord Lieutenant of Inverness
Hugh Massy, 9th Baron Massy	
Matthew Deane, 7th Baron Muskerry	
John Browne, 6th Baron Kilmaine	
Frederick Cavendish, 7th Baron Waterpark	
Henry Graves, 7th Baron Graves	
William Vanneck, 5th Baron Huntingfield	
Henry Hotham, 7th Baron Hotham	
Rowland Allanson-Winn, 6th Baron Headley	
Edward Crofton, 5th Baron Crofton	
Peter ffrench, 7th Baron ffrench	
Hugh Shore, 6th Baron Teignmouth	
Geoffrey Rowley-Conwy, 9th Baron Langford	
Arthur Eveleigh-de-Moleyns, 7th Baron Ventry	
Henry Prittie, 6th Baron Dunalley	
John Bingham, 7th Baron Clanmorris	
Robert Trench, 4th Baron Ashtown	
Charles Thellusson, 8th Baron Rendlesham	
John Handcock, 7th Baron Castlemaine	
Arthur Beresford, 6th Baron Decies	
George Canning, 5th Baron Garvagh	
Edward Bellew, 5th Baron Bellew	
Edmund Roche, 5th Baron Fermoy	
‡ Thomas McClintock-Bunbury, 5th Baron Rathdonnell	

=== Female hereditary peers ===
Key
‡	Indicates peerage whose holder is currently alive

==== Who took their seat ====
Title		Name	Title by marriage	Date inherited peerage	Date took seat	Date left House of Lords	Ref.
Baroness Strange of Knokin	(Note: The title in the Peerage of England.)	Elizabeth Philipps	Viscountess St Davids	23 February 1921	19 November 1963	12 December 1974	
Baroness Audley		Rosina MacNamee		3 July 1963	20 November 1963	24 October 1973	
Baroness Beaumont		Mona Fitzalan-Howard	Baroness Howard of Glossop	1 June 1896	4 December 1963	31 August 1971	
Lady Kinloss	(Note: The title in the Peerage of Scotland.)	Mary Freeman-Grenville		17 October 1944	18 February 1964	11 November 1999	
Countess of Erroll		Diana Hay		24 January 1941	29 July 1964	16 May 1978	
Lady Nairne		Katherine Bigham	Viscountess Mersey	3 June 1927	27 October 1964	20 October 1995	
Lady Sempill		Ann Forbes-Sempill		30 December 1965	19 July 1966	6 July 1995	
Baroness Berkeley		Mary Foley-Berkeley		5 April 1967	10 May 1967	17 October 1992	
Countess of Loudoun		Barbara Abney-Hastings		24 February 1960	22 June 1967	11 November 1999	
Lady Ruthven of Freeland		Bridget Monckton	Viscountess Monckton of Brenchley	6 April 1956	26 October 1967	17 April 1982	
Countess of Sutherland		Elizabeth Sutherland		1 January 1963	27 March 1968	11 November 1999	
Baroness Darcy de Knayth		Davina Ingrams		23 March 1943	15 July 1969	24 February 2008	
Baroness Dacre		Rachel Douglas-Home		24 February 1970	28 May 1970	11 November 1999	
Baroness Portal of Hungerford	(Note: The title in the Peerage of the United Kingdom.)	Rosemary Portal		22 April 1971	26 April 1972	29 September 1990	
Baroness Dudley		Barbara Hamilton		19 April 1972	23 May 1973	11 November 1999	
Baroness Lucas		Anne Palmer		3 November 1958	10 June 1975	31 December 1991	
‡ Countess of Mar		Margaret of Mar		21 April 1975	28 October 1975	1 May 2020	
Lady Saltoun		Flora Fraser		31 August 1979	13 December 1979	12 December 2014	
‡ Baroness Braye		Mary Aubrey-Fletcher		19 December 1985	9 April 1986	11 November 1999	
Baroness Strange		Jean Drummond of Megginch		10 December 1986	17 December 1986	11 March 2005	
Countess Mountbatten of Burma		Patricia Knatchbull	Baroness Brabourne	27 August 1979	8 July 1987	11 November 1999	
Baroness Wharton		Myrtle Robertson		4 April 1990	25 June 1990	15 May 2000	
‡ Baroness Willoughby de Eresby		Jane Heathcote-Drummond-Willoughby		29 March 1983	25 January 1994	11 November 1999	
Baroness Berners		Pamela Kirkham		30 June 1995	25 October 1995	11 November 1999	
‡ Baroness Arlington		Jennifer Forwood		28 April 1999	27 May 1999	11 November 1999	

==== Who did not take their seat ====
Title	Name	Title by marriage	Date inherited peerage
Baroness Furnivall	Mary Dent		3 May 1913
Countess of Seafield	Nina Caroline Studley-Herbert		12 November 1915
Baroness Zouche	Mary Frankland		7 April 1917
Countess of Dysart	Wenefryde Scott		22 November 1935
Baroness Berners	Vera Williams		19 April 1950
Baroness de Ros	Georgiana Maxwell		9 August 1958
Countess of Kintore	Ethel Keith-Falconer	Viscountess Stonehaven	26 May 1966
Baroness Wharton	Elisabeth Kemeys-Tynte		22 July 1969
Lady Herries of Terregles	Anne Fitzalan-Howard	Baroness Cowdrey of Tonbridge	31 January 1975
Countess of Dysart	Rosamund Greaves		2 June 1975

== Repealed enactments ==
Section 7(2) of the act repealed 10 enactments, listed in schedule 2 to the act.

Chapter	Short title	Description	Extent of Repeal
6 Anne c. 11 (Note: This is the citation in The Statutes of the Realm.)	Union with Scotland Act 1706	The Union with Scotland Act 1706.	Article XXII of the Treaty of Union so far as that Article relates to peers of Scotland; and Article XXIII of that Treaty except the words from " that all peers of Scotland " to " enjoy the same ".
1706 c. 7	Union with England Act 1707	An Act of the Parliament of Scotland ratifying and approving the Treaty of Union of the two Kingdoms of Scotland and England.	Article XXII of the Treaty of Union so far as that Article relates to peers of Scotland; and Article XXIII of that Treaty except the words from " that all peers of Scotland " to " enjoy the same ".
1706 c. 8	Election Act 1707	An Act of the Parliament of Scotland settling the manner of electing the sixteen peers and forty-five commoners to represent Scotland in the Parliament of Great Britain.	So far as it relates to peers of Scotland.
6 Anne c. 78	Scottish Representative Peers Act 1707	The Scottish Representative Peers Act 1707.	The whole act.
39 & 40 Geo. 3. c. 67	Union with Ireland Act 1800	The Union with Ireland Act 1800.	In Article IV of the Treaty of Union, in the fourth paragraph, the words " of Great Britain ".
40 Geo 3. c. 38 (Ir.)	Act of Union (Ireland) 1800	The Act of Union (Ireland) Act 1800.	In Article IV of the Treaty of Union, in the fourth paragraph, the words " of Great Britain ".
10 & 11 Vict. c. 52	Representative Peers (Scotland) Act 1847	The Representative Peers (Scotland) Act 1847.	The whole act.
14 & 15 Vict. c. 87	Representative Peers (Scotland) Act 1851	The Representative Peers (Scotland) Act 1851.	The whole act.
7 & 8 Geo. 5. c. 64	Representation of the People Act 1918	The Representation of the People Act 1918.	Section 9(5) so far as saved by paragraph (a) of the proviso to section 80(7) of the Representation of the People Act 1948.
18 & 19 Geo. 5. c. 34	Reorganisation of Offices (Scotland) Act 1928	The Reorganisation of Offices (Scotland) Act 1928.	Section 6.

== Subsequent developments ==
Section 7(2) of, and schedule 2 to, the act were repealed by section 1 of, and part XI of the schedule to, the Statute Law (Repeals) Act 1974, which came into force on 27 June 1974.

== See also ==
- Peerage Act 1963 (Wikisource)
- List of peerages inherited by women
- House of Lords Reform Act 2014

== Bibliography ==
- Cox, Noel. "The British Peerage: The Legal Standing of the Peerage and Baronetage in the Overseas Realms of the Crown with Particular Reference to New Zealand." New Zealand Universities Law Review, Vol. 17, 1997.
- Peerage Act 1963.
- Image of the act on the Parliamentary website
