= Baron Archibald =

Extinct barony in the Peerage of the United Kingdom

Baron Archibald, of Woodside in the City of Glasgow, was a title in the Peerage of the United Kingdom. It was created on 12 July 1949 for George Archibald. He subsequently served as Captain of the Yeomen of the Guard under Clement Attlee. His son, the second Baron, disclaimed the peerage ten days after his succession in 1975. He was an economist. The peerage became extinct on his death in 1996.

== Barons Archibald (1949) ==
- George Archibald, 1st Baron Archibald (1898–1975)
- George Christopher Archibald, 2nd Baron Archibald (1926–1996) (disclaimed 1975)
