= List of acts of the Parliament of Scotland from 1706 =

This is a list of acts of the Parliament of Scotland for the year 1706.

It lists acts of Parliament of the old Parliament of Scotland, that was merged with the old Parliament of England to form the Parliament of Great Britain, by the Union with England Act 1707 (c. 7).

For other years, see list of acts of the Parliament of Scotland. For the period after 1707, see list of acts of the Parliament of Great Britain.

== 1706 ==
The 4th session of the parliament of Anne, held in Edinburgh from 3 October 1706 until 25 March 1707.

| Short title, or popular name | Citation | Royal assent |
Long title
| Adjournment of Session Act 1706 (repealed) | 1706 c. 1 (Note: This is the citation in the Record Edition.); 1706 c. 1 (Note: This is the citation in the Duodecimal Edition.) | 1 November 1706 |
Act Adjourning the Session till the first day of December next. (Repealed by Statute Law Revision (Scotland) Act 1906 (6 Edw. 7. c. 38))
| Supply Act 1706 (repealed) | 1706 c. 2; 1706 c. 2 | 9 November 1706 |
Act for a Supply of Eight Months Cess out of the Land Rent. (Repealed by Statute Law Revision (Scotland) Act 1906 (6 Edw. 7. c. 38))
| Musters of Fencibles Act 1706 (repealed) | 1706 c. 3; 1706 c. 3 | 30 November 1706 |
Act against all Mustors and Rendevouzes during the present Session of Parliament without Her Majesties special command. (Repealed by Statute Law Revision (Scotland) Act 1906 (6 Edw. 7. c. 38))
| Adjournment of Session (No. 2) Act 1706 (repealed) | 1706 c. 4; 1706 c. 4 | 3 December 1706 |
Act adjourning the Session to the first day of January next and continueing the sitting thereof from the last of February to the lastday of March next inclusive. (Repealed by Statute Law Revision (Scotland) Act 1906 (6 Edw. 7. c. 38))

=== Sources ===
- Alexander, William (1841). "Acta Parliamentorum Annæ". An Abridgement of the Acts of the Parliaments of Scotland. Edinburgh: Adam and Charles Black. p. 523 – via Google Books.
- Alexander, William (1841). "Acta Parliamentorum Annæ". An Abridgement of the Acts of the Parliaments of Scotland. Edinburgh: Adam and Charles Black. p. 523 – via Google Books.
- Chronological Table of the Statutes. London: Her Majesty's Stationery Office. 1972. p. 1368 – via Google Books.
- "Index of Statutes: Anne (1702-1707)". Records of the Parliaments of Scotland to 1707. University of St Andrews.

== See also ==
- List of legislation in the United Kingdom
- Records of the Parliaments of Scotland
