= Cestui que Vie Act 1707 =

Act of the Parliament of Great Britain

Cestui que Vie Act 1707 (Note: The citation of this act by this short title was authorised by section 1 of, and the first schedule to, the Short Titles Act 1896. Due to the repeal of those provisions it is now authorised by section 19(2) of the Interpretation Act 1978.)
- Act of Parliament
- Parliament of Great Britain
- Long title: An Act for the more effectual Discovery of the Death of Persons pretended to be alive to the prejudice of those who claim Estates after their Deaths. (Note: These words are printed against this act in the second column of the first schedule to the Short Titles Act 1896, which is headed "Title".)
- Citation: 6 Ann. c. 72 (Note: This is the citation in The Statutes of the Realm); 6 Ann. c. 18 (Note: This is the citation in The Statutes at Large)
- Territorial extent: Great Britain

Dates
- Royal assent: 20 March 1708
- Commencement: 23 October 1707 (Note: Start of session.)
Other legislation
Amended by	Statute Law Revision Act 1888; Short Titles Act 1896; Supreme Court of Judicature (Consolidation) Act 1925; Statute Law Revision Act 1948; Constitutional Reform Act 2005

Status: Amended

Text of statute as originally enacted

Revised text of statute as amended

Text of the Cestui que Vie Act 1707 as in force today (including any amendments) within the United Kingdom, from legislation.gov.uk.

The Cestui que Vie Act 1707 (6 Ann. c. 72) is an act of the Parliament of Great Britain.

As of 2026, the act remains partly in force in England and Wales, although according to the government website link given below, there are no known outstanding effects from the act, and the only text that has not been repealed is in the nature of a preamble.
