= Yorkshire Registries Act 1884 =

Act of the Parliament of the United Kingdom

Yorkshire Registries Act 1884 (Note: Section 1.)
- Act of Parliament
- Parliament of the United Kingdom
- Long title: An Act to consolidate and amend the law relating to the Registration of Deeds and other matters affecting lands and hereditaments within the North, East, and West Ridings of the County of York.
- Citation: 47 & 48 Vict. c. 54
- Territorial extent: United Kingdom

Dates
- Royal assent: 7 August 1884
- Commencement: 1 January 1885 (Note: Section 2.)
- Repealed: 5 November 1993

Other legislation
- Amends: See § Repealed enactments
- Repeals/revokes: See § Repealed enactments
- Repealed by: Crown Estate Act 1961; Law of Property Act 1969; Statute Law (Repeals) Act 1993

Status: Repealed

Text of statute as originally enacted

The Yorkshire Registries Act 1884 (47 & 48 Vict. c. 54) was an act of the Parliament of the United Kingdom that consolidated enactments related to the registration of deeds and other matters affecting lands and hereditaments within the North Riding, East Riding, and West Riding of the county of York.

== Provisions ==
=== Repealed enactments ===
Section 51 of the act repealed 4 enactments, listed in the first schedule to the act.

Citation	Short title	Description	Extent of repeal
2 & 3 Anne c. 4	Yorkshire (West Riding) Land Registry Act 1703	An Act for the publick registring of all deeds, conveyances, and wills that shall be made of any honors, manors, lands, tenements, or hereditaments within the west riding of the county of York after the nine-and-twentieth day of September one thousand seven hundred and four.	The whole act.
6 Anne c. 20 (Note: This is the citation in The Statutes of the Realm.)	Yorkshire (West Riding) Land Registry Act 1706	An Act for inrollments of bargains and sales within the west riding of the county of York in the register office there lately provided, and for making the said register more effectual.	The whole act.
6 Anne c. 62	Yorkshire (East Riding) Land Registry Act 1707	An Act for the publick registring of all deeds, conveyances, wills, and other incumbrances that shall be made of or that may affect any honors, manors, lands, tenements, or hereditaments within the east riding of the county of York or the town and county of the town of Kingston-upon-Hull after the nine-and-twentieth day of September one thousand seven hundred and eight, and for the rendring the register in the west riding more complete.	The whole act.
8 Geo. 2. c. 6	Yorkshire (North Riding) Deeds Registry Act 1734	An Act for the publick registring of all deeds, conveyances, wills, and other incumbrances that shall be made of or that may affect any honors, manors, lands, tenements, or hereditaments within the north riding of the county of York after the nine-and-twentieth day of September one thousand seven hundred and thirty-six.	The whole act.

== Subsequent developments ==
The whole act, except section 49, was repealed in stages by section 16(2) of, and part I of schedule 2 to, the Law of Property Act 1969 (c. 59), as the Yorkshire deeds registries were progressively closed.

Section 49 was repealed by section 1(1) of, and part XIII of schedule 1 to, the Statute Law (Repeals) Act 1993 (c. 50), which came into force on 5 November 1993.
