= George Christopher Archibald =

British economist (1926–1996)

George Archibald
- Born: George Christopher Archibald; December 30, 1926; Scotland
- Died: February 22, 1996 (aged 69); Appleby-in-Westmorland, United Kingdom
- Education: Cambridge University (BA)
- Scientific career
- Fields: Economics

George Christopher Archibald (30 December 1926 – 22 February 1996), briefly 2nd Baron Archibald in 1975, also known as Chris Archibald, was a British economist, a researcher and professor. He played a significant role in building the new University of Essex into a premier UK research centre for the social sciences in the 1960s.

Richard Lipsey (1996), a friend and colleague, in reviewing Archibald's last book, Information, Incentives, and the Economics of Control (1992) usefully summarises his approach to economics. He was "firmly in the camp of those who accept the practical value of the price system as a coordinator of decentralized decision making while rejecting the cruder versions of Chicagoism that everything produced by the price system is optimal." And while emphasising "the virtues of the price system" noted that "its unaided operations were, in his own words, 'not beyond human wit to improve upon.'" (Lipsey, 1996, p1005-6)

Archibald was born in Scotland, the first son of Dorothy Archibald and George Archibald, 1st Baron Archibald. He completed high school at Phillips Exeter Academy in New Hampshire, and received his bachelor's degree in history from Cambridge University in 1943. After military service in WWII and Palestine, he completed a Bachelor of Science in economics at the London School of Economics in 1951.

After graduation Archibald taught in Otago, New Zealand, but returned to the London School of Economics (LSE) in 1955 and was appointed to the staff. He was one of the founding members of the LSE Staff Seminar on Methodology, Measurement and Testing. He left LSE in 1964 to join the staff at the newly created University of Essex, where he received a professor's chair in 1967. In 1971, he moved to the University of British Columbia. Also in 1971 he married Daphne May Vincent Henman, his second wife. Upon the death of his father, instead of becoming Baron Archibald, he renounced the peerage, expressing the opinion that hereditary honours were empty honours. He retired from the University of British Columbia in 1991 and moved back to Britain.

== Selected publications ==
- with R. G. Lipsey (1958) "Monetary and Value Theory: A Critique of Lange and Patinkin" The Review of Economic Studies 26(1): pp. 1–22, doi:10.2307/2295854, applied Patinkin's theory to stock flows and stock equilibrium and developed that relationship for the first in modern monetary economics.
- (1967) "Refutation or Comparison" The British Journal for the Philosophy of Science 17(4): pp. 279–296, doi:10.1093/bjps/17.4.279, detailed some of what measurement and testing can and cannot accomplish.
- (1992) Information, Incentives, and the Economics of Control Cambridge University Press, Cambridge, England, ISBN 0-521-33045-9 (new edition republished in 2005), is considered a staple in the field.

Peerage of the United Kingdom
Preceded by George Archibald	Baron Archibald; 1975	Disclaimed; Extinct (1996)
