= Duties on East India Goods Act 1707 =

Act of the Parliament of Great Britain

- Act of Parliament
- Parliament of Great Britain
- Long title: Act for better Securing the Duties of East India Goods.
- Citation: 6 Ann. c. 37 (Note: This is the citation in The Statutes of the Realm.); 6 Ann. c. 3 (Note: This is the citation in The Statutes at Large.)
- Territorial extent: Great Britain

Dates
- Royal assent: 18 December 1707
- Commencement: 23 October 1707 (Note: Start of session.)
- Repealed: 5 July 1825
Other legislation
Repealed by	Customs Law Repeal Act 1825
Relates to	East India Company Act 1697; East India Company Act 1711

Status: Repealed

Text of statute as originally enacted

The Duties on East India Goods Act 1707 (6 Ann. c. 37) was an act of the Parliament of Great Britain.

The act was considered by a committee of the House of Lords on 15 December 1707, after which Lord Herbert reported that it was "fit to pass, without any Amendment", which was then done. It received royal assent on 18 December 1707.

The act extended the monopoly of the English East India Company across Scotland thus encompassing the whole of the new Great Britain. Thus this corporation based in the City of London was able to enjoy a set of privileges which enabled it, rather than private British subjects, to dominate trade in half of the emerging British Empire.

== Subsequent developments ==
The whole act was repealed by section 444 of the Customs Law Repeal Act 1825 (6 Geo. 4. c. 105), which came into force on 5 July 1825.
