= Scottish Representative Peers Act 1707 =

Act of the Parliament of Great Britain

Scottish Representative Peers Act 1707 (Note: The citation of this act by this short title was authorised by section 1 of, and the first schedule to, the Short Titles Act 1896. Due to the repeal of those provisions it is now authorised by section 19(2) of the Interpretation Act 1978.)
- Act of Parliament
- Parliament of Great Britain
- Long title: An Act to make further Provision for electing and summoning Sixteen Peers of Scotland, to sit in the House of Peers in the Parliament of Great Britain; and for trying Peers for Offences committed in Scotland; and for the further regulating of Voters in Elections of Members to serve in Parliament.
- Citation: 6 Ann. c. 78 (Note: This is the citation in The Statutes of the Realm); 6 Ann. c. 23 (Note: This is the citation in The Statutes at Large)
- Territorial extent: Great Britain

Dates
- Royal assent: 1 April 1708
- Commencement: 23 October 1707 (Note: Start of session.)
- Repealed: 31 July 1963
Other legislation
Amended by	Trial of Peers (Scotland) Act 1825; Statute Law Revision Act 1867; Promissory Oaths Act 1871; Statute Law Revision Act 1888; Criminal Justice Act 1948; Statute Law Revision Act 1948
Repealed by	Peerage Act 1963

Status: Repealed

Text of statute as originally enacted

The Scottish Representative Peers Act 1707 (6 Ann. c. 78) was an act of the Parliament of Great Britain.

== Subsequent developments ==
Section 4 of the act was repealed by section 1 of, and part II of schedule one to, the Promissory Oaths Act 1871 (34 & 35 Vict. c. 48), which came into force on 13 July 1871.

Section 3 as to the Forms of the Oaths therein mentioned and as to the Declaration thereby required, and sections 13 and 14, of the Act were repealed by section 1 of, and the first schedule to, the Statute Law Revision Act 1948 (11 & 12 Geo. 6. c. 62), which came into force on 30 July 1948.

In the title, the words from "and for the further" were repealed by section 1 of, and the first schedule to, the Statute Law Revision Act 1948 (11 & 12 Geo. 6. c. 62), which came into force on 30 July 1948.

The whole act was repealed by sections 4 and 7(2) of, and schedule 2 to, the Peerage Act 1963, which came into force on 31 July 1963.

== See also ==
- Representative peer
