= City of London (Garbling of Spices and Admission of Brokers) Act 1707 =

Act of the Parliament of Great Britain

- Act of Parliament
- Parliament of Great Britain
- Long title: An Act for repealing the Act of the first Year of King James the First, entitled An Act for the well garbling of spices; and for granting an Equivalent to the City of London by admitting Brokers.
- Citation: 6 Ann. c. 68 (Note: This is the citation in The Statutes of the Realm.); 6 Ann. c. 16 (Note: This is the citation in The Statutes at Large.)
- Territorial extent: Great Britain

Dates
- Royal assent: 11 March 1708
- Commencement: 23 October 1707 (Note: Start of session.)
- Repealed: 1 October 1939
Other legislation
Repeals/revokes	Spices Act 1603
Amended by	Statute Law Revision Act 1867; Statute Law Revision Act 1887
Repealed by	Food and Drugs Act 1938

Status: Repealed

Text of statute as originally enacted

The City of London (Garbling of Spices and Admission of Brokers) Act 1707 (6 Ann. c. 68) was an act of the Parliament of Great Britain. The act reformed the office of 'garbler' and regulated brokers in the City of London.

== Provisions ==
The provisions of the act include:

- Repealing the Spices Act 1603 (1 Jas. 1. c. 19) and discharging any suits and penalties stemming from it.
- Allowing the Lord Mayor and Aldermen of the City of London to appoint and employ an official 'garbler' who would 'garble' (remove impurities from) spices, drugs or other goods at a set salary, with the profits from the job being reserved for the City of London.
- Allowing the Chamberlain of London to charge 40 shillings to brokers for entry into the city and another 40 shillings on the 29 September annually after the end of the first session of Parliament. The money raised would in the first instance be given to William Stewart, who had held the office of garbler since 1686, to compensate for loss of earnings under the new system. After paying Stewart, the remaining revenues could then be 'enjoyed' by the Mayor and citizens of the City of London.
- Making it a finable offence to act as a broker within the City of London without being admitted as such, punishable with a fine of £25.

== Subsequent developments ==
Sections 1 and 2 of the act were repealed by section 1 of, and the schedule to, the Statute Law Revision Act 1867 (30 & 31 Vict. c. 59), which came into force on 15 July 1867.

The whole act was repealed by section 101(1) of, and the first part of the fourth schedule to, the Food and Drugs Act 1938 (1 & 2 Geo. 6. c. 56), which came into force on 1 October 1939.
