= Queen Anne's Bounty Act 1707 =

Act of the Parliament of Great Britain

Queen Anne's Bounty Act 1707 (Note: The citation of this act by this short title was authorised by section 1 of, and the first schedule to, the Short Titles Act 1896. Due to the repeal of those provisions it is now authorised by section 19(2) of the Interpretation Act 1978.)
- Act of Parliament
- Parliament of Great Britain
- Long title: An Act to inlarge the time for returning the certificates of all ecclesiastical livings, not exceeding the yearly value of fifty pounds; as also for discharging all livings of that value from the payment of first-fruits; and for allowing time to archbishops and bishops, and other dignitaries, for payment of their first-fruits.
- Citation: 6 Ann. c. 54 (Note: This is the citation in The Statutes of the Realm); 6 Ann. c. 27 (Note: This is the citation in The Statutes at Large)
- Territorial extent: Great Britain

Dates
- Royal assent: 1 April 1708
- Commencement: 23 October 1707 (Note: Start of session.)
- Repealed: 16 July 1926
Other legislation
Amended by	Statute Law Revision Act 1887; Statute Law Revision Act 1888
Repealed by	First Fruits and Tenths Measure 1926

Status: Repealed

Text of statute as originally enacted

The Queen Anne's Bounty Act 1707 (6 Ann. c. 54) was an act of the Parliament of Great Britain. It was one of the Queen Anne's Bounty Acts 1706 to 1870.

The act is chapter 27 of 6 Ann. in common printed editions.

== Subsequent developments ==
Sections 2 and 3 and 4 were repealed by section 1 of, and the schedule to, the Statute Law Revision Act 1867 (30 & 31 Vict. c. 59), which came into force on 15 July 1867.

The whole act was repealed by section 6 of, and schedule 2 to, the First Fruits and Tenths Measure 1926 (No 5), which came into force on 16 July 1926.
