= Cathedral Statutes Act 1707 =

Act of the Parliament of Great Britain

Cathedral Statutes Act 1707 (Note: The citation of this act by this short title was authorised by section 1 of, and the first schedule to, the Short Titles Act 1896. Due to the repeal of those provisions it is now authorised by section 19(2) of the Interpretation Act 1978.)
- Act of Parliament
- Parliament of Great Britain
- Long title: An Act for the avoiding of Doubts and Questions touching the Statutes of divers Cathedrals and Collegiate Churches. (Note: These words are printed against this act in the second column of the first schedule to the Short Titles Act 1896, which is headed "Title".)
- Citation: 6 Ann. c. 75 (Note: This is the citation in The Statutes of the Realm); 6 Ann. c. 21 (Note: This is the citation in The Statutes at Large)
- Territorial extent: Great Britain

Dates
- Royal assent: 20 March 1708
- Commencement: 23 October 1707 (Note: Start of session.)
- Repealed: 31 July 1963

Other legislation
- Amended by: Statute Law Revision Act 1867
- Repealed by: Cathedrals Measure 1963

Status: Repealed

Text of statute as originally enacted

The Cathedral Statutes Act 1707 (6 Ann. c. 75) was an act of the Parliament of Great Britain.

== Subsequent developments ==
Sections 2 and 3 of the act were repealed by section 1 of, and the schedule to, the Statute Law Revision Act 1867 (30 & 31 Vict. c. 59), which came into force on 15 July 1867.

The whole act was repealed by section 54(1) of, and schedule 2 to, the Cathedrals Measure 1963 (No 2).
