= Bristol by-election =

Bristol by-election may refer to:

== Bristol ==
- 1878 Bristol by-election

== Bristol East ==
- 1911 Bristol East by-election
- 1931 Bristol East by-election

== Bristol West ==
- 1928 Bristol West by-election
- 1951 Bristol West by-election
- 1957 Bristol West by-election

== Bristol Central ==
- 1943 Bristol Central by-election

== Bristol South East ==
- 1950 Bristol South East by-election
- 1961 Bristol South East by-election
- 1963 Bristol South East by-election
