= Henry Maurice =

Henry Maurice may refer to:

- Henry Maurice (minister) (1634–1682), Welsh Independent clergyman
- Henry Maurice (theologian) (c. 1647–1691), clergyman and Lady Margaret Professor of Divinity at Oxford University
- Henry Gascoyne Maurice (1874–1950), British civil servant and naturalist

== See also ==
- Henry Morris (disambiguation)
