= Elizabeth Weisburger =

American chemist (1924–2019)

- Born: April 9, 1924; Finland, Bucks County, PA
- Died: February 12, 2019; Villages of Rockville, Rockville, Maryland
- Education: BS in Chemistry, Lebanon Valley College (1944); Ph.D. in Organic Chemistry, University of Cincinnati (1947)
- Occupation: Chemist
- Employer(s): US Public Health Service Commissioned Corps; National Cancer Institute
- Known for: Toxicology and Chemical Carcinogenesis Research Co-Founded National Cancer Institute Experimental Pathology Branch Carcinogen Screening Section
- Spouse: John Weisburger
- Children: 3
- Parents: Raymond Samuel Kreiser (father); Amy Elizabeth Snavely Kreiser (mother)
- Relatives: 4 grandchildren 7 great-grandchildren
- Honours: Honorary Doctorate of Science, Lebanon Valley College; Honorary Doctorate of Science, University of Cincinnati

Elizabeth Amy Kreiser Weisburger (April 9, 1924 – February 12, 2019) was an American chemist who made significant contributions in medicine and chemistry, specifically chemical carcinogenesis. She worked for nearly 40 years at the National Cancer Institute and received multiple awards for her work. Weisburger's research in chemical carcinogenesis was necessary in order to find treatments for cancer. Some of Weisburger's work included studying carcinogenesis, looking at the activity of carcinogens, and determining the dangers of chemotherapy drugs. Elizabeth Weisburger is considered a pioneer in chemical carcinogenesis.

== Biography ==
Elizabeth Amy Kreiser Weisburger was born on April 9, 1924, in Finland, Pennsylvania. She was one of 10 children. At a very young age her family moved to Ono, Pennsylvania, were Elizabeth grew up. Both of her parents were teachers along with many of her relatives so Elizabeth began learning at a young age at home. In 1944, she received a B.S. degree in chemistry from Lebanon Valley College in Annville, Pennsylvania. Elizabeth accepted a graduate assistantship job at the University of Cincinnati. In 1947, she received a Ph.D. degree from the University of Cincinnati. She continued to work at Cincinnati after receiving her degree. She married John Hans Weisburger in April 1947 who was also a graduate student at the University of Cincinnati. In 1949, John and Elizabeth Weisburger began postdoctoral studies at the National Cancer Institute. They had three children together and continued to work together until 1972 when John left the National Cancer Institute. In 1974, John and Elizabeth got divorced.

In 1988, Weisburger retired from the National Cancer Institute. She had four grandchildren and latterly worked for a consulting company and tutored children. Weisburger died in Rockville, Maryland, in February 2019 at the age of 94.

== Career ==
Elizabeth Amy Kreiser Weisburger's contributions to science are in the field of chemical carcinogenesis particularly on the molecular level. Her contributions aided in finding cancer treatments along with preventions. Her career began at the University of Cincinnati under Professor Francis Earl Ray. There she researched fluorene compounds for chemotherapeutic agents as well as carcinogenic agents. In 1949, John and Elizabeth both began postdoctoral work at the National Cancer Institute under Dr. Harold Morris. His research was in chemical carcinogenesis. In 1951, Elizabeth became an officer in the Commissioned Corps of the U.S. Public Health Service. She then began work in a biochemistry lab at the National Cancer Institute. In 1961, John and Elizabeth together started the Carcinogen Screening Section of the Experimental Pathology Branch at the National Cancer Institute. In 1974, Elizabeth became chief of the Laboratory of Carcinogen Metabolism. She then moved to the Division of Cancer Etiology and became the assistant director for chemical carcinogenesis in 1981. After retiring in 1988 from the National Cancer Institute, she began consulting in toxicology and chemical carcinogenesis.

=== Research ===
- Weisburger, Elizabeth; Weisburger, John (1958). "Chemistry, Carcinogenicity, and Metabolism of 2-Fluorenamine and Related Compounds". Advances in Cancer Research. 5: 331–431. doi:10.1016/S0065-230X(08)60415-7. PMID 13533060 – via Elsevier Science Direct.
- Weisburger, Elizabeth; Weisburger, John; Grantham, Preston (January 1966). "Transport of carcinogens: Rat blood plasma and red cell binding of isotope after N-hydroxy-N-2-fluorenylacetamide". Life Sciences. 5 (1): 41–45. doi:10.1016/0024-3205(66)90185-8. PMID 5933654 – via Elsevier Science Direct.
- Weisburger, Elizabeth; Weisburger, John; Morris, Harold (April 1953). "Studies on the metabolism of 2-acetylaminofluorene-9-C14". Archives of Biochemistry and Biophysics. 43 (2): 474–484. doi:10.1016/0003-9861(53)90142-8. PMID 13051197 – via Elsevier Science Direct.
- Weisburger, Elizabeth; Weisburger, John (1968). "Food additives and chemical carcinogens: On the concept of zero tolerance". Food and Cosmetics Toxicology. 6 (2): 235–242. doi:10.1016/0015-6264(68)90204-6. PMID 4990070 – via Elsevier Science Direct.
- Weisburger, Elizabeth (August 1990). "Mechanistic considerations in chemical carcinogenesis". Regulatory Toxicology and Pharmacology. 12 (1): 41–52. doi:10.1016/S0273-2300(05)80045-5. PMID 2217918 – via Elsevier Science Direct.
- Weisburger, Elizabeth (October 1989). "Current carcinogen perspectives: De minimis, Delaney and decisions". Science of the Total Environment. 86 (1–2): 5–13. Bibcode:1989ScTEn..86....5W. doi:10.1016/0048-9697(89)90188-5. PMID 2690341 – via Elsevier Science Direct.
- Weisburger, Elizabeth; Dipple, Anthony; Michejda, Christopher (1985). "Metabolism of chemical carcinogens". Pharmacology & Therapeutics. 27 (3): 265–296. doi:10.1016/0163-7258(85)90072-5. PMID 3931106 – via Elsevier Science Direct.

== Awards ==
Weisburger received many awards during her career. Some of them are listed below:

Award	Awarding body	Year
Public Health Service Meritorious Medal	US Public Health Service	1973
National Honorary Member	Sigma Delta Epsilon	1977
Hildebrand Prize	Chemical Society of Washington	1981
Garvan Medal	American Chemical Society	1981
National Honorary Member	Iota Sigma Pi	1981
Distinguished Service Medal	US Public Health Service	1985
Professional Service Award	Alpha Chi Sigma Washington Chapter	1987
Distinguished Scientist Award	D.C. Chapter of the Society for Experimental Biology	1996
Stokinger Award	American Conference of Governmental Industrial Hygienists	1996
