= 1911 Bristol East by-election =

By-election in the United Kingdom

The 1911 Bristol East by-election was a Parliamentary by-election held on 3 November 1911. The constituency returned one Member of Parliament (MP) to the House of Commons of the United Kingdom, elected by the first past the post voting system.

== Vacancy ==
Rt Hon. Charles Hobhouse had been Liberal MP for Bristol East since 1900. In October 1911 he was made a member of Asquith's cabinet as Chancellor of the Duchy of Lancaster and in accordance with the practice at the time, was required to resign his seat and seek re-election.

== Electoral history ==
General election December 1910: Bristol East Electorate 14,938
Party	Candidate	Votes	%	±%
Liberal	Charles Hobhouse	7,229	62.9	+10.9
Conservative	Patrick Hannon	4,263	37.1	+6.3
Majority		2,966	25.8	+4.6
Turnout		11,492	76.9	−10.0
Liberal hold		Swing	-2.3	

== Candidates ==
Given that this seat had been Liberal since it was created in 1885, it was not surprising that the Conservatives did not contest the seat. Walter Moore stood as an Independent.

== Result ==
There was a collapse in voter turnout, perhaps due to the absence of an official Unionist candidate. Despite this, the Liberal share of the vote remained static;

By-Election 3 November 1911: Bristol East Electorate 14,951
Party	Candidate	Votes	%	±%
Liberal	Charles Hobhouse	4,913	62.8	−0.1
Independent	Walter Moore	2,913	37.2	New
Majority		2,000	25.6	−0.2
Turnout		7,826	52.3	−24.6
Liberal hold		Swing	N/A	

== Aftermath ==
A General Election was due to take place by the end of 1915. By the autumn of 1914, the following candidates had been adopted to contest that election;

- Liberal Party: Charles Hobhouse
- Independent Labour Party: Walter Ayles

Due to the outbreak of war, the election did not take place until 1918;

General election 14 December 1918: Bristol East Electorate 33,679
Party	Candidate	Votes	%	±%
National Liberal	*George Bryant Britton	9,434	49.6	N/A
Labour	Luke H Bateman	8,135	42.8	New
Liberal	Charles Hobhouse	1,447	7.6	−55.2
Majority		1,299	6.8	N/A
Turnout		19,016	56.5	+4.2
National Liberal gain from Liberal		Swing		

- Britton was the endorsed candidate of the Coalition Government.
