= Joseph Dodge Weston =

Sir Joseph Dodge Weston (1822 – 5 March 1895) was an English merchant and shipping magnate and Liberal politician who was active in local government and sat in the House of Commons in two periods between 1885 and 1895.

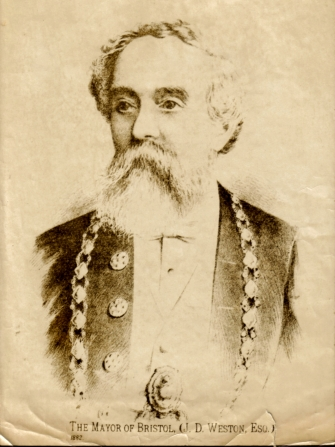
Joseph Dodge Weston, 1875

Weston was born in Kingsdown, Bristol, the son of Thomas Weston and his wife Mary Tuck. His father was a wealthy iron merchant at Redcliffe. He joined the family firm and developed the business to take in iron foundries, cotton manufacture and railway wagon and carriage building. He was one of the original promoters and founders of the Bristol Waggon Works and was chairman of the Patent Nut and Bolt Co. His shipping interests thrived in the time of emigration to Australia.

Weston took an interest in politics and became a city councillor for Bristol in 1868, serving on the council until 1892. He was interested in public libraries, and after Bristol adopted the Public Libraries Act in 1874 he was behind the building of its first branch library at St Philips in 1876 and put some of his own money into it. He presided over Bristol's purchase and development of the Portishead and Avonmouth docks. He was mayor of Bristol for four years from 1880 to 1884. He was a J.P. for Bristol and received a knighthood. He lived at Dorset House, Bristol.

In 1885, Weston was elected MP for Bristol South, but lost the seat in 1886. In 1890 he became MP for Bristol East – a large working class constituency. He was a liberal of advanced views and in favour of Home Rule. and it was commented that "He might be a socialist if Socialism were more respectable and not so dreadfully lowering"!.

Weston died at the age of 72 and was buried Arnos Vale Cemetery.

Parliament of the United Kingdom
New constituency see Bristol	Member of Parliament for Bristol South; 1885 – 1886	Succeeded by Edward Stock Hill
Preceded by Handel Cossham	Member of Parliament for Bristol East; 1890 – 1895	Succeeded by Sir William Wills
