= Jean Corston, Baroness Corston =

British politician (born 1942)

The Right Honourable The Baroness Corston PC
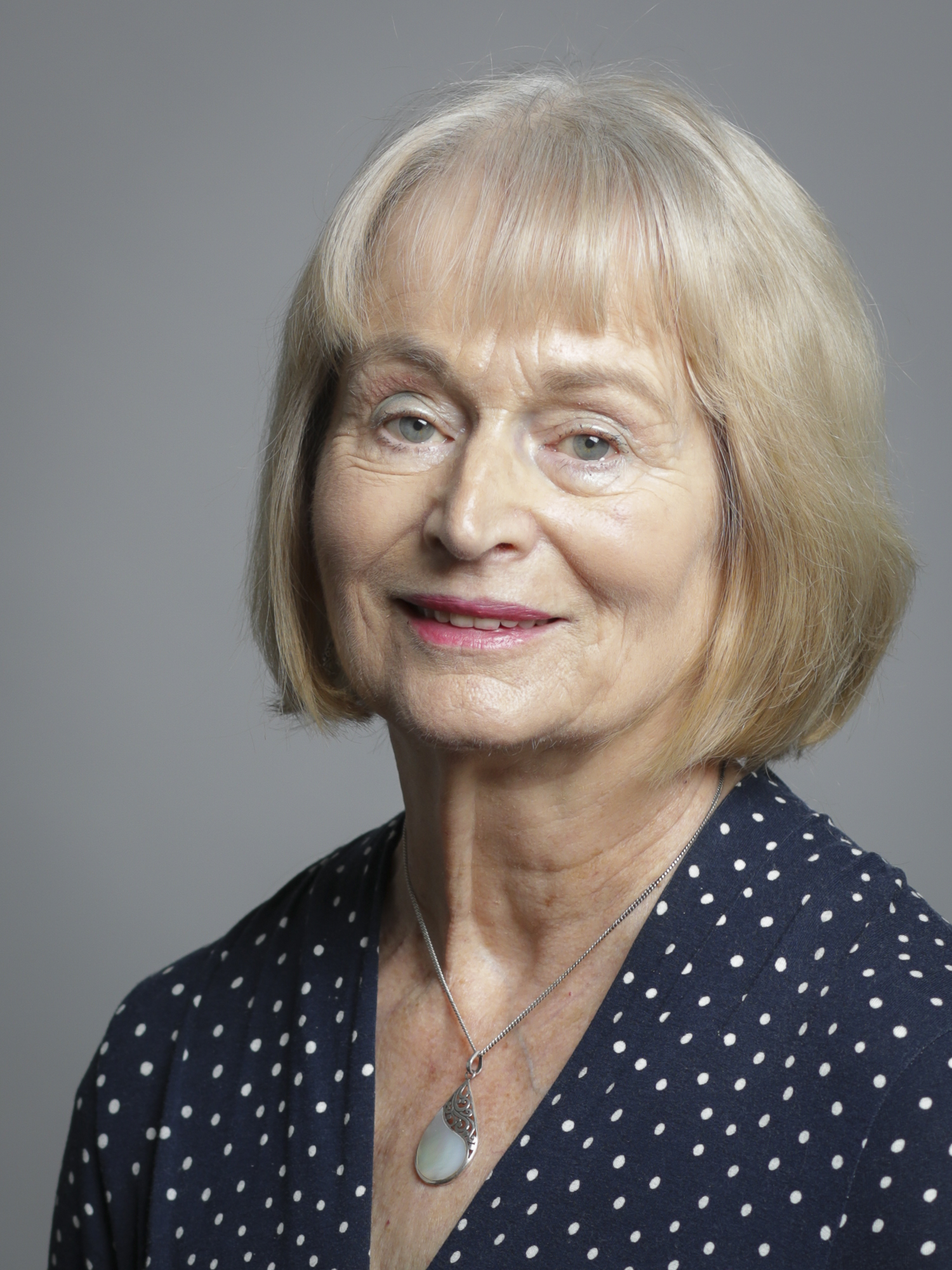
- Official portrait, 2020

Chair of the Parliamentary Labour Party
- In office 11 July 2001 – 24 May 2005
- Leader: Tony Blair
- Preceded by: Clive Soley
- Succeeded by: Ann Clwyd

Member of Parliament for Bristol East
- In office 9 April 1992 – 11 April 2005
- Preceded by: Jonathan Sayeed
- Succeeded by: Kerry McCarthy

Member of the House of Lords
- Lord Temporal
- Life peerage 29 June 2005 – 9 July 2024

Personal details
- Born: Jean Ann Parkin; 5 May 1942 (age 84) Kingston upon Hull, England
- Party: Labour
- Spouse(s): Christopher Corston; Peter Townsend
- Children: 2
- Education: London School of Economics, Open University

Jean Ann Corston, Baroness Corston, PC (née Parkin; born 5 May 1942), is a British politician and life peer who served as Member of Parliament (MP) for Bristol East from 1992 to 2005, during which time she served as Chair of the Parliamentary Labour Party from 2001 to 2005.

== Early life ==
Jean Ann Parkin went to Yeovil Girls' High School (now the Westfield Community School) on Stiby Road in Yeovil and the Somerset College of Arts and Technology. She worked at the Inland Revenue. At the London School of Economics, she gained a Bachelor of Laws in 1989. From 1989 to 1990, she studied at the Inns of Court School of Law. She also studied with the Open University. She became a barrister.

== Career ==
Corston was Member of Parliament (MP) for Bristol East from April 1992 to 2005. Until stepping down at the 2005 general election, she was chair of the Parliamentary Labour Party, the first woman ever to hold that position. She was the first Labour MP to ask a question of Tony Blair at his first Prime Minister's Questions on 21 May 1997.

=== Life peerage ===
On 13 May 2005 it was announced that she would be created a life peer, and on 29 June 2005 she was created Baroness Corston, of St George, in the County and City of Bristol.

She ceased to be a member of the House of Lords on 9 July 2024 under the House of Lords Reform Act 2014, because of her non-attendance in the preceding session of Parliament.

=== Corston Report ===
Corston was commissioned by the Home Office to conduct an independent investigation into vulnerable women in the criminal justice system of the United Kingdom. Her report, which was published in March 2007, observed that many women who are in prison are mentally ill, and asked "should they be in prison?" The report outlines "the need for a distinct radically different, visibly-led, strategic, proportionate, holistic, woman-centred, integrated approach". The report, known as the Corston Report, has largely informed government policy on the matter. Progress and improvements by local probation services, the National Probation Service, Her Majesty's Prison Service and the National Offender Management Service (NOMS) are regularly compared to the recommendations in this report.

== Personal life ==
She married first Christopher Corston in 1961 with whom she had a son and daughter. Her partner from 1980 until he died in 2009 was Peter Townsend, the sociologist. The couple married in Bristol in 1985.

Parliament of the United Kingdom
Preceded by Jonathan Sayeed	Member of Parliament for Bristol East; 1992–2005	Succeeded by Kerry McCarthy
Political offices
Preceded by Clive Soley	Chair of the Parliamentary Labour Party; 2001–2005	Succeeded by Ann Clwyd
