= Handel Cossham =

Handel Cossham MP
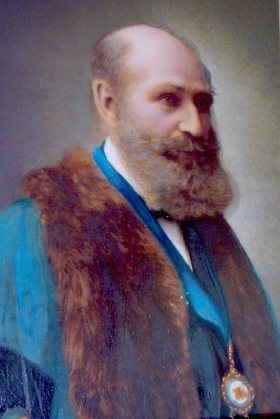

Member of Parliament for Bristol East
- In office 1885–1890
- Succeeded by: Sir Joseph Dodge Weston

Personal details
- Born: 31 March 1824 Thornbury
- Died: 23 April 1890 (aged 66) London
- Party: Liberal
- Spouse: Elizabeth Wethered
- Profession: Politician & Colliery owner

Handel Cossham (31 March 1824 – 23 April 1890) was a British colliery owner, lay preacher and Liberal politician who was active in local government and sat in the House of Commons from 1885 to 1890.

== Early life ==
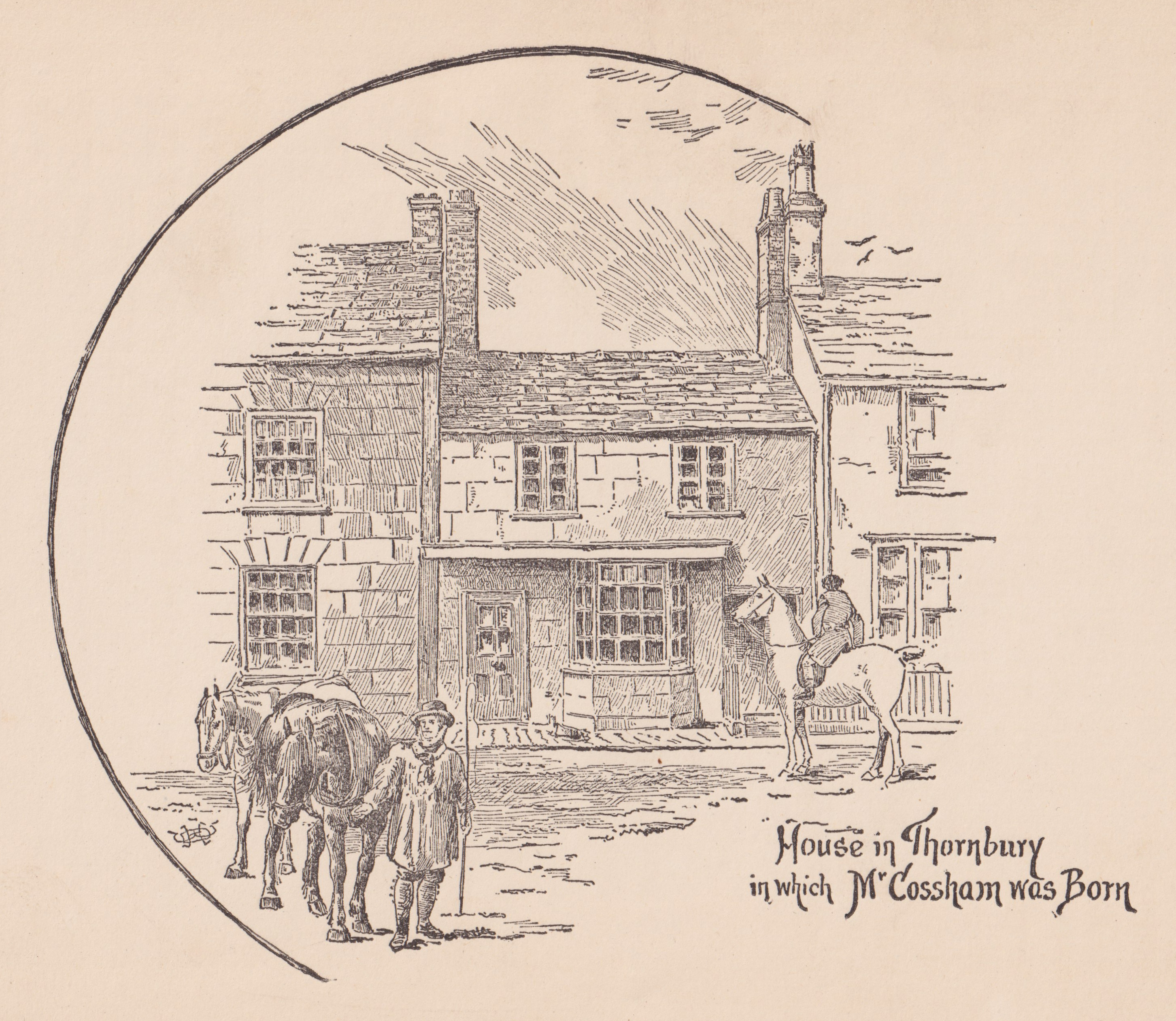
Birth place, Thornbury

Cossham was born in High Street, Thornbury, in a house where his father, grandfather and great-grandfather were also born. His father Jesse Cossham, a carpenter and builder, named his son after the composer of Messiah, George Frederic Handel. A plaque at his birthplace describes him as a "non-conformist Preacher, Industrialist, Geologist, Politician, Educationalist and Public Benefactor".

== Career ==
Cossham began his involvement in the coal industry in 1845 at Yate colliery. In 1848 he married Elizabeth Wethered and through a partnership with her family, began Parkfield Colliery at Pucklechurch in 1851. As a caring employer, Cossham also built houses and a school for his colliery workers at Parkfield. The partnership opened several other coal pits, initially under the name of Cossham and Wethered Ltd and from 1867, the Kingswood Coal and Iron Company Ltd. The business came under control of Handel Cossham and Charles S. Wills after 1879 when the Kingswood and Parkfield Colliery Company Ltd was formed. In 1862, Handel Cossham built the British School in Thornbury, which remains today. The Cossham Hall, which was built as a Wesleyan chapel, was purchased and donated to Thornbury by Cossham in 1888.

== Political life ==
Cossham represented St. Paul's ward on Bristol City Council as a Liberal during the 1860s. He stood unsuccessfully for Parliament at Nottingham in 1866, at Dewsbury in 1868 and at Chippenham in 1874. He was Mayor of Bath from 1882 to 1885. At the 1885 general election he was elected Member of Parliament (MP) for the newly created Bristol East and retained the seat in 1886.

== Death ==
The grave of Handel Cossham at Avonview Cemetery in Bristol

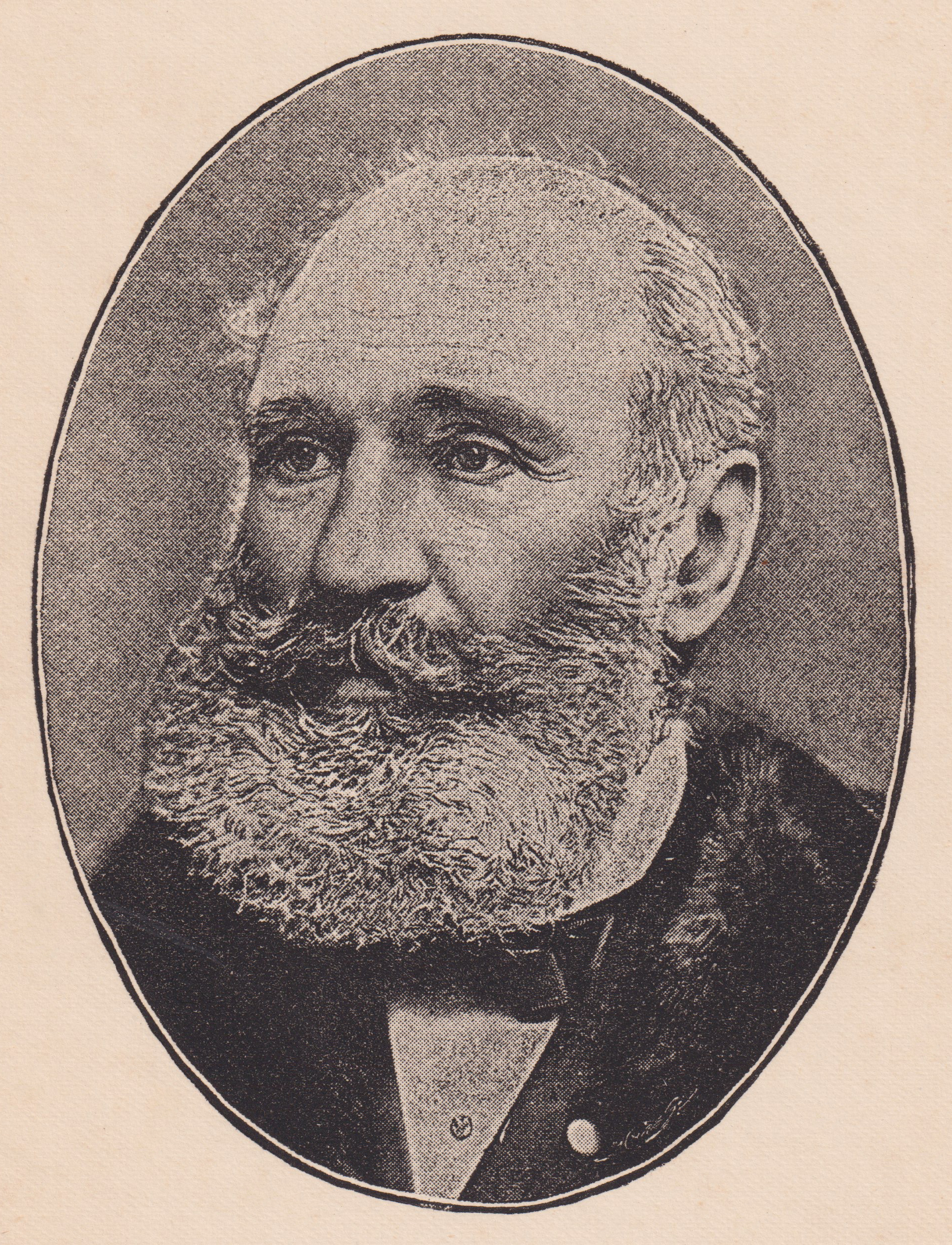
Handel Cossham, 1890

In April 1890, whilst in the library of the Houses of Parliament, Cossham was taken ill and died the following day aged 66. An estimated 50,000 people lined the streets on the day of his funeral. His estate amounted to £59,127. In 1900, his collieries were sold at auction for £61,000. The Cossham Memorial Hospital in Kingswood, Bristol is a memorial to Handel Cossham, who instructed in his will that his estate be used for the building of a hospital.

== Personal papers ==
Records relating to Handel Cossham's collieries and estates are held at Bristol Archives (Ref. 9492).

Parliament of the United Kingdom
New constituency	Member of Parliament for Bristol East; 1885–1890	Succeeded by Sir Joseph Dodge Weston
