= Henry Morris =

Henry Morris may refer to:

- Henry Morris (MP) (by 1536–1572/3), MP for Devizes
- Sir Henry Morris, 1st Baronet (1844–1926), British medical doctor
- Henry Morris (1874–1945), aka Énrí Ó Muirgheasa, Irish scholar and folklorist
- Henry Morris (education) (1889–1961), English Education Officer who developed the Village college
- Henry M. Morris (1918–2006), young earth creationist, hydrological engineer and Christian apologist; father of the creation science movement
- Henry Morris (footballer) (1919–1993), Scottish international footballer
- Henry Morris (satirist) (born 1982), English satirist and writer

== See also ==
- Henry Maurice (disambiguation)
- Henry Morris-Jones (1884–1972), Welsh doctor, soldier and politician
- Harry Morris (disambiguation)
