= Harold Morris =

Harold Morris may refer to:

- Harold Morris (composer) (1890–1964), American pianist, composer and educator
- Harold Morris (politician) (1876–1967), British lawyer, judge and politician
- Whiz Morris (Harold Marsh Morris, 1898–1984), English cricketer
- Harold Arthur Morris (1884–1977), awarded the Freedom of the City of Kimberley, South Africa

== See also ==
- Harry Morris (disambiguation)
