= Walter Baker (British politician) =

British politician (1876–1930)

Walter John Baker

Walter John Baker (1876 – 2 December 1930) was a Labour Party politician in the United Kingdom who served as Member of Parliament (MP) for Bristol East from 1923 until his death.

== Life ==
Baker was Assistant General Secretary of the Union of Post Office Workers, and head of their research department. He unsuccessfully contested the 1918 and 1922 general elections in the Harborough division of Leicestershire. At the 1923 general election he stood in Bristol East, where he won the seat from the National Liberal MP Harold Morris. Baker was re-elected in 1924 and 1929, and died in office in December 1930, aged 54.

The resulting by-election in January 1931 was won by the Labour candidate Stafford Cripps.

Trade union offices
Preceded by New position	Deputy General Secretary of the Union of Post Office Workers; 1919–1930	Succeeded by James Paterson
Parliament of the United Kingdom
Preceded by Harold Morris	Member of Parliament for Bristol East; 1923 – 1930	Succeeded by Stafford Cripps
