= Jonathan Sayeed =

British politician

Member of Parliament for Mid Bedfordshire
- In office 1 May 1997 – 11 April 2005
- Preceded by: Sir Nicholas Lyell
- Succeeded by: Nadine Dorries

Member of Parliament for Bristol East
- In office 9 June 1983 – 16 March 1992
- Preceded by: Constituency established
- Succeeded by: Jean Corston

Personal details
- Born: 20 March 1948 (age 78)
- Party: Conservative

Jonathan Sayeed (born 20 March 1948) is an Anglo-Indian British politician who was a Conservative Member of Parliament in the United Kingdom from 1983 to 1992 and from 1997 to 2005.

He was the only member of the Conservative front bench who consistently, openly and publicly opposed the invasion of Iraq in 2003. Though he was reselected by the Mid Bedfordshire Conservative Association to contest his seat in the House of Commons shortly before the 2005 general election, he was forced to retire owing to ill health.

He was criticised by the Committee on Standards and Privileges for being "at the least careless, at the worst negligent" in respect of a company in which he had an interest, but no evidence was found that he had directly received any improper payments. In the investigation by Sir Thomas Legg into MPs' expenses, he was one of the minority of MPs who were completely cleared of any misuse of their second home allowances.

== Early life ==
Jonathan Sayeed is the son of the late M M Sayeed, a chartered electrical engineer from India, and L S Sayeed.

Sayeed was educated at Woolverstone Hall School in Suffolk.

He joined the Royal Navy in 1965, when he was 17. He spent two years at Britannia Royal Naval College, Dartmouth, and then studied at the Royal Naval Engineering College, Manadon, for a BSc in Electrical and Electronic Engineering. He left the Navy in 1973, at the age of 24.

== Career in business ==
After leaving the Royal Navy, Sayeed joined Marks and Spencer PLC as a management trainee. Since 1974 "he worked as a shipping and insurance consultant", and held directorships in various international companies:

- Founder director, Wade Emerson & Co Ltd 1974–82.
- Chairman and chief executive, Calmady Insurance Services Ltd 1982–83.
- Chairman, Ranelagh Ltd 1992–96.
- Non-executive director, Love Lane Investments Ltd (Holding Company) 1992–96.
- Chairman, Training Division Corporate Services Group PLC 1996–97.
- Chairman Ranelagh International Ltd 2005-2016.
- Chairman Patient Pak Holdings Ltd 2008-2009, and Patient Pak Ltd 2008-2009.

== Private life ==
Whilst he was MP for Mid Bedfordshire, Sayeed lived in Westminster, and also had a house in Houghton Conquest.

He was a member of the Reform Club and is a member of the Carlton Club. His interests include golf (Secretary, Lords and Commons Golfing Society 2004 and winner, 1998 and 1999, of the Parliamentary Handicap), sailing (Royal Naval Sailing Association and Royal Temple YC), tennis, skiing, classical music (Chairman of the Parliament Choir 2002–2003), books and architecture.

== MP for Bristol East, 1983-1992 ==
Sayeed was twice an unsuccessful candidate for the Greater London Council before entering Parliament at his first attempt. He was elected MP for Bristol East at the 1983 general election, where he defeated Tony Benn. The constituency was created for that general election, partly from the Bristol South East constituency, where Benn had been MP for much of the previous 32 years. For the Conservatives, this was one of "the three great prizes" of the election, as Benn was said to be "the man they most love to hate". At the 1987 general election, Sayeed more than doubled his majority.

Due to his election in 1983 he became the first MP of Indian or Asian descent elected since the 1920s, due to his father being Indian and was one of the first ethnic minority MPs elected in the 20th century.

Sayeed served on the select committees for Defence and the Environment; was chairman of the Shipping and Shipbuilding Committee; and deputy chairman of the All-Party Maritime Group. In 1988, he secured an Urban Development Corporation for Bristol despite the opposition of the then Environment Secretary, Nicholas Ridley. Sayeed started to climb the ministerial ladder in 1991, when he was appointed parliamentary private secretary to Lord Belstead as Paymaster General. However, in 1992 his career took a step backward when he lost his seat to Labour at the general election.

== Out of Parliament, 1992-97 ==
In 1996, Sayeed sold his public affairs company, and was appointed chairman of the training division of Corporate Services Group plc. In May 1997, he stood down as chairman after being elected Member of Parliament for Mid Bedfordshire.

== MP for Mid Bedfordshire 1997-2005 ==
He returned to Parliament as MP for Mid Bedfordshire at the 1997 general election, having defeated the incumbent MP, Sir Nicholas Lyell, the Attorney General, for the nomination, and held the seat until 2005.

=== Hague election campaign ===
Sayeed's offices at 28 Stafford Place were the headquarters for William Hague's successful bid to become Conservative leader in 1997.

=== Career progress ===
Sayeed served on the Broadcasting Select Committee, and was appointed by the Speaker of the House of Commons to the Chairman's Panel. This small group of senior MPs comprises chairmen of the Committees that debate legislation.

In the 1999-2000 session of Parliament, Lord Weatherill and Sayeed introduced a private member's bill which was passed into law. This was the Census (Amendment) Bill.

Sayeed was chairman of European Standing Committee C, was joint-chairmen (together with Labour MP Bill O'Brien) of the Standing Committee on Regional Affairs.

Sayeed achieved his first frontbench post in 2001, when he was appointed shadow minister for Environment, Food and Rural Affairs, working under the Shadow Environment, Food and Rural Affairs Secretary, Peter Ainsworth. "Among his first roles has been to lead for the Conservatives on the Home Energy Conservation Bill, for which he declared his party's support strongly at Second Reading. In Committee he made plain that this support was entirely conditional upon the continued inclusion of firm targets in the final text." The Association for the Conservation of Energy (ACE) praised his efforts saying: "In a few months in post Mr Sayeed has proved himself to be a doughty fighter for strong policies backing energy conservation." Sayeed continued as shadow minister after a reshuffle by the Conservative leader The Rt Hon Iain Duncan Smith in July 2002.

=== War on terrorism and the Iraq war ===
Following the 11 September terrorist attacks against the United States, the UK Parliament was recalled, and a solemn five-hour emergency sitting of the House of Commons debated the crisis. Jonathan Sayeed said that military might alone would not be enough to deal with the problem. "There has to be some understanding why there is such hatred for so many institutions within the United States. Unless we deal with some of the deep-seated causes, then more terrorists will come to the fore." However, the Prime Minister was adamant that there should be no "moral ambiguity" about the events in the US, that the entitlement to dislike the US could never justify the actions carried out.

In early 2003, the British Prime Minister Tony Blair supported American plans for the invasion of Iraq. British armed forces were deployed to participate in the invasion. The British Conservative leader Iain Duncan Smith supported British government policy on this.

Every Conservative MP has been instructed by pager message not to voice doubts about a possible war to journalists, but to share them privately with Mr Duncan Smith or the chief whip, David Maclean. Despite this warning, several Tories, including one on the front bench, have openly dissented from the party line. Jonathan Sayeed, a shadow Environment minister, told the Commons last week that he had heard no convincing case for war. "Every television company will broadcast to the world, including the Arab world, harrowing pictures of the human catastrophe that warfare leaves in its wake, and the closer war comes to Baghdad the greater will be the innocent casualties."

An article by Sayeed was published in The Guardian on 24 January 2003: entitled An undemocratic war. He wrote: "I believe that although a war against Iraq may become necessary, I am not convinced that it is necessary now, and that more should be done to avert war."

Three members of the Conservative front bench and one Conservative whip resigned their posts so that they could vote against the war:

- John Baron - shadow minister for Health
- Humfrey Malins - shadow minister for Home Affairs
- Jonathan Sayeed - shadow minister for Environment
- John Randall - Whip

=== Views ===
Whilst he was MP for Bristol East, Sayeed called for the establishment of charity-run hostels for the homeless on derelict council land.

Economically, Sayeed was on the right of the Conservative party, opposing British entry into the single European currency. He had strong views on defence. On social matters, he was on the more liberal wing of the party, with the exception of gay rights in the Armed Forces, on which he opposed the lifting of the ban on homosexuals serving. As an MP, he was considered a well informed and thoughtful contributor to debates on foreign policy in the Middle East and on economic, defence and social matters.

Sayeed urged for new roads to regenerate towns and inner-cities. He campaigned against a proposed 17-tonne lorry ban, against illegal sites for travellers, and against 'unnecessary' development of the Bedfordshire countryside. He successfully persuaded the UK government to propose amendments to the Nuclear Non Proliferation Treaty and, despite opposition from the then Secretary of State for the Environment Nicholas Ridley, persuaded the Conservative government to permit an Urban Development Corporation in Bristol. In 2004 he proposed the end of male primogeniture for the British Monarchy though such a principle would not have been applied to the Prince of Wales or Prince William.

=== Return to business ===
For much of the time when Sayeed was MP for Mid-Bedfordshire, the chairman of the local constituency party was Alexandra Messervy. Messervy also became one of Sayeed's part-time paid assistants in the House of Commons. In June 2001 Messervy set up a travel company called The English Manner Ltd. The business of this company was to provide luxury travel holidays to the UK for Americans; the holidays included lessons in English etiquette from members of the English upper classes and access to exclusive events and institutions. Mrs Messervy had a 60% shareholding, Sayeed had 30%, and 10% was owned by Mrs Genie Ford (who ran operations in the US).

In May–June 2003 or 2004, Ashley Green succeeded Alexandra Messervy as the local constituency party chairman.

In summer 2004, The Sunday Times claimed "The English Manner Ltd charges clients up to £500 per day for access to the Palace of Westminster through Jonathan Sayeed". This was completely denied by the company, a denial that was supported by evidence. On a number of occasions Sayeed provided entertainment in the House of Commons for individuals (some of whom were long-standing friends of Mr Sayeed) on holidays arranged by The English Manner. However, there is no evidence that Sayeed received any direct financial benefit for this.

There was a meeting of the local constituency party's executive council on 13 September 2004 to discuss the allegations in the Sunday Times article. It is claimed that at the meeting, Messervy announced that a local donor, Martin Randall, had agreed to give the party some £10,000, so long as "Jonathan is still the candidate at the general election." (Martin Randall was chairman of a double-glazing company called Crystal Clear, to which Sayeed was a consultant.)

The Conservative whip was temporarily suspended from Sayeed from 3 February to 7 March 2005 after the House of Commons Committee on Standards and Privileges recommended that he be suspended from the service of the House for 10 working days. The Committee found that a company in which he had an interest had appeared to derive financial benefit from its offering tours of Parliament and ran the risk of damaging the reputation of Parliament.

Sayeed said that the suspension was "unjust and wrong" but he made an "unreserved" apology to MPs in the Commons chamber: "I accept that a complaint was brought because of ineffectual internal controls in a company in which I had an interest and that as an MP I was negligent in not checking the actions of that company. For that I unreservedly apologise to the House." He told colleagues he had disposed of his shares in The English Manner and resigned as a consultant to it. He said: "I can assure the House that I have never used my access to the House or its facilities for direct or indirect commercial benefit and I have never solicited or received any payment for any tour or entertainment within the Palace of Westminster."

On 17 February 2005, the Mid-Bedfordshire Conservative Association held a meeting at the Rufus Centre in Flitwick to consider Jonathan Sayeed's future. The meeting decided by a majority of 173 to 126, that Sayeed should remain the Conservative candidate in the forthcoming general election. After the vote, Constituency association president Sir Stanley Odell resigned in protest. One constituency party member, Geoffrey Beckwith, said: "I think the membership was strongly against the motion. Mr Sayeed has behaved impeccably. This is just a storm in a teacup. I think the chairman of the party [Ashley Green] might now have to look to his own position."

On 21 February 2005, the constituency party chairman's wife, Mrs Valmai A Green, and another member, wrote to the Parliamentary Commissioner for Standards, enclosing a letter Sayeed had sent to members of the Mid-Bedfordshire Conservative Association, and asking if Sayeed should have used House of Commons stationery and facilities for this. "The Committee issued a second report on 17 March 2005 criticising Sayeed for failing to apologise for his conduct as the first report had ordered, for sending out a circular on House of Commons stationery to members of the Mid Bedfordshire Conservative Association asking for their support in his reselection, and misuse of allowances to pay for work on his home. Following this report, the Conservative Party removed the whip from Sayeed permanently." Under Conservative Party rules, a sitting MP can only be an approved party candidate in a parliamentary election if he/she is in receipt of the party whip. This enables the Conservative Party leader to overrule local constituency Conservative Party branches who want to retain their sitting MP as candidate.

In March 2005, Sayeed was criticised by the House of Commons Committee on Standards and Privileges for his use of allowances and Parliament's stationery. He was ordered to pay back £12,500 which was spent on his Bedfordshire home – the money is allocated for London expenses only. This money was subsequently repaid to Sayeed following his producing the receipts for the correct property. Similarly treated was a further £9,500 in expenses investigated by the Standards and Privileges Committee. In the investigation by Sir Thomas Legg of the validity of payments of the Additional Costs (or 'Second Homes') Allowance (ACA) made to Members of Parliament during 2004–05 to 2008-09 Jonathan Sayeed was one of the minority of MPs who were completely cleared of any impropriety or misuse of their allowances.

"On 14 March 2005, it was announced that Jonathan Sayeed would not be contesting the May 2005 general election, on grounds of ill health."

Jonathan Sayeed was one of two Conservative MPs who had the party whip withdrawn at the time of the election. The other was Howard Flight, who was deselected over comments he made on Conservative spending plans.

== Since 2005 ==
He retired from Parliament at the general election of 2005, and was a chairman of various small companies until 2016. In 2009, the Advertising Standards Authority upheld ten complaints against his company PatientPak, accusing the company's marketing campaign of "scaremongering" when advertising its patient hygiene kit as "essential to protect against hospital superbugs".

On 19 July 2005, the House of Commons Committee on Standards and Privileges concluded that, in making ACA claims in respect of an ineligible property, Mr Sayeed did not properly observe the administrative rules relating to the allowance, and therefore breached the Code of Conduct in this respect. The committee explained this conclusion writing, "We agree with the Commissioner and deplore Mr Sayeed's failure to take the steps necessary to satisfy himself that such important matters were being dealt with properly. Had he still been a Member, we would have given serious consideration to a further period of suspension."

Parliament of the United Kingdom
New constituency	Member of Parliament for Bristol East; 1983–1992	Succeeded by Jean Corston
Preceded by Sir Nicholas Lyell	Member of Parliament for Mid Bedfordshire; 1997–2005	Succeeded by Nadine Dorries
