= Harold Morris (politician) =

British judge and politician (1876–1967)

Sir Harold Morris MBE
- Morris in 1936

Member of Parliament for Bristol East
- In office 15 November 1922 – 16 November 1923
- Preceded by: George Britton
- Succeeded by: Walter Baker

Personal details
- Born: 21 December 1876 Highbury, London, England
- Died: 11 November 1967 (aged 90) Kew, Surrey, England

Sir Harold Spencer Morris MBE (21 December 1876 – 11 November 1967) was an English barrister, judge and National Liberal MP.

== Family and education ==
Harold Morris was born in Highbury, London, the son of Sir Malcolm Morris, KCVO, the eminent surgeon and dermatologist. He was educated at Clifton College and Magdalen College, Oxford. Morris married Olga Teichman of Chislehurst. They had one son and four daughters.

== Career ==
Morris graduated in law from Oxford. He was called to the Bar by the Inner Temple in 1899 and joined the South-East Circuit. Between 1914 and 1919 he served the Coldstream Guards, including two and half years service in France was mentioned in dispatches and awarded the military MBE. He took silk in 1921 and was the same year appointed Recorder of Folkestone, serving until 1926. One of his first cases as a barrister was appearing on behalf of Vernon Henry St John in his peerage claim, which was something of a scandal at the time. From 1926 to 1945 he served as President of the Industrial Court and from 1925 he was Chairman of the National Wages for Railways. He was knighted in 1927. In 1929, Morris was appointed Chairman of the Committee on Unemployment Claims and from 1930 to 1935 he was Chairman of the Coal Wages Board. In the 1940s he was elected a member of the Royal Institution. In 1944 he was Chairman of the Court of Inquiry set up by the Minister of Labour and National Service to look into the wages and hours of work obtaining in the woolcombing section of the wool textile industry in Yorkshire. He retired from legal work in 1945, aged 70 but maintained directorships of a number of companies.

== Peel Commission ==
In 1936, Morris was appointed as a member of the Palestine Royal Commission, or the Peel Commission, which was set up to look into the disturbances between the Arab and Jewish populations of the British Mandated Territory of Palestine. The Commission recommended that there should be a Jewish national state in north and west of Palestine and an Arab state in the east and south. However the government rejected the Commission's proposal to partition Palestine.

== Politics ==
At the 1922 general election, Morris was selected as the Lloyd George National Liberal candidate for Bristol East. Bristol East had been a Liberal seat since its creation in 1885 and had been held by Sir Charles Hobhouse. It was fought and won in 1918 by George Bryant Britton as a Coalition Liberal in opposition to Hobhouse who remained an Independent Asquithian. However Britton did not wish to stand again in 1922 and Morris was chosen to replace him. He faced a straight fight with Labour and just held the seat with a majority of 151 votes. At the 1923 general election Morris was again involved in a straight fight against Labour. Despite the surge in support for the re-united Liberal Party at this election nationally, Morris was unable to hold onto his seat, losing to Labour's Walter John Baker by 2,040 votes. After this election Morris decided to concentrate on his legal career and did not stand for Parliament again.

== Death ==
Morris died at his home at 21 Lichfield Road, Kew, in Surrey, on 11 November 1967 aged 90.

== Publications ==
- The Barrister, Geoffrey Bles, London 1930
- Back View, Reminiscences including a Biography of Sir Malcolm Alexander Morris, Peter Davies, London, 1960

Parliament of the United Kingdom
Preceded by George Bryant Britton	Member of Parliament for Bristol East; 1922–1923	Succeeded by Walter John Baker
