= Bristol East =

UK Parliament constituency (since 1983)

- Borough constituency for the House of Commons
- Interactive map of boundary from 2024
- Boundary of Bristol East in South West England
- County: City of Bristol
- Population: 95,368 (2011 census)
- Electorate: 75,936 (2023)

Current constituency
- Created: 1983
- Member of Parliament: Kerry McCarthy (Labour)
- Seats: One
- Created from: Bristol South East; Bristol South; Bristol North East

1885–1950
- Seats: One
- Type of constituency: Borough constituency
- Created from: Bristol
- Replaced by: Bristol South East, Bristol Central and Bristol South

Bristol East is a constituency (Note: A borough constituency (for the purposes of election expenses and type of returning officer)) recreated in 1983 covering the eastern part of the city of Bristol, represented in the House of Commons of the UK Parliament since 2005 by Kerry McCarthy of the Labour Party. (Note: As with all constituencies, the constituency elects one Member of Parliament (MP) by the first past the post system of election at least every five years.)

== Constituency profile ==
The Bristol East constituency is located within the city of Bristol in South West England. It is almost entirely urban or suburban and covers the neighbourhoods to the east and south-east of the city centre including Easton, St George, Brislington, Knowle and Stockwood. Bristol is a major port city and has a long history of trade, including the slave trade.

Compared to national averages, residents of Bristol East are younger and less religious and have average levels of income, education and professional employment. Parts of the constituency close to the city centre around Easton are amongst the top 10% most deprived areas in England, although the suburban areas around St George and Brislington are wealthier. The constituency is slightly more ethnically diverse than the rest of the country; 77% of the population are White, 10% are Black and 7% are Asian. Local politics at the city council are mixed; the parts of the constituency near the city centre are represented by Green Party councillors similar to neighbouring Bristol Central, whilst Labour, Liberal Democrat and Conservative councillors were all elected in the suburban areas. Most voters in the constituency supported remaining in the European Union in the 2016 referendum; an estimated 56% opposed Brexit compared to 48% nationally.

== History ==
=== First creation ===
The seat was first created in 1885 (Note: See the Redistribution of Seats Act 1885). Boundaries were slightly altered in 1918 and Bristol East was abolished in a comprehensive review of the local seats for the 1950 general election.

==== Political history ====
In 1931 the seat was a Labour outpost

The most powerful representative of Bristol East in Parliament and H.M. Government was Sir Stafford Cripps, MP (Lab) 1931–1950, who was Chancellor of the Exchequer from 1947 to 1950. The seat shifted from Liberal Party representation through to the Labour Party with the 1918-1923 period seeing a more centrist Liberal splinter group candidate elected. In the 1931 landslide result, the seat was one of 16 won by Labour outside of Glamorgan, the London Docklands, Manchester and the North Midlands coalfield (including some in Sheffield).

=== Second creation ===
The seat was recreated in 1983 on much larger boundaries than before 1950, reflecting the lower occupation levels of the city centre and allocation of new seats elsewhere to reflect population expansion mainly in former rural and lightly populated suburban areas.

==== Political history ====
The 1983 election, the first in the recreated East seat, was a landslide victory for Margaret Thatcher's Conservatives following retention of the Falkland Islands in the Falklands War. Bristol East returned a Conservative MP, as Jonathan Sayeed defeated Tony Benn, the outgoing MP for Bristol South East and the leader of a large faction on the left wing of the Labour Party. In 1992 Labour's Jean Corston gained the seat from Sayeed, which has been retained by Labour candidates at each subsequent general election, the Conservatives coming second, except in 2005, when the Liberal Democrats did so. (Note: Including two re-elections of Corston, who was later elevated to the House of Lords as Baroness Corston) The 2015 result gave the seat the 42nd-smallest majority of Labour's 232 seats by percentage of majority; however, in 2017, incumbent MP Kerry McCarthy more than tripled her majority, winning the largest share of the vote in the seat's history and by the biggest margin since 1997.

==== Turnout ====
Turnout has ranged between 80.3% in 1992 to 57.4% in 2001.

==== Other parties ====
Five parties' candidates achieved more than the deposit-retaining threshold of 5% of the vote in 2015. Prior to the 2024 election the largest third-party share of the vote had been won by Liberal Democrat candidate Philip James in the 2005 election with 25.2% of the vote. This record was beaten by the Green Party candidate Ani Stafford-Townsend who won 30.7% of the vote, the Green Party’s first second place in the seat since its creation.

== Boundaries ==
Map of boundaries 2010-2024

The constituency covers the eastern part of the city of Bristol, from neighbourhoods of the City Centre to outer neighbourhoods (excluding surrounding settlements in local government administratively).

1885–1918: The Municipal Borough of Bristol ward of South, part of North ward, and the local government district of St George.

1918–1950: The County Borough of Bristol wards of St George East and St George West, and parts of Easton, and Somerset wards.

1983–1997: The City of Bristol wards of Brislington East, Brislington West, Easton, Eastville, Hengrove, Lawrence Hill, and Stockwood.

1997–2010: The City of Bristol wards of Brislington East, Brislington West, Easton, Eastville, Lawrence Hill, St George East, St George West, and Stockwood.

2010–2024: The City of Bristol wards of Brislington East, Brislington West, Eastville, Frome Vale, Hillfields, St George East, St George West, and Stockwood.

2024–present: The City of Bristol wards of: Brislington East; Brislington West; Easton; Knowle; Lawrence Hill; St. George Central; St. George Troopers Hill; St. George West; and Stockwood.

The seat was subject to major boundary changes in the 2023 Periodic Review of Westminster constituencies, which came into effect for the 2024 general election. It gained the Easton and Lawrence Hill wards from Bristol West and Knowle from Bristol South. These gains were offset by the loss of Eastville, Frome Vale and Hillfields, which were included in the re-established Bristol North East constituency.

== Members of Parliament ==
=== MPs 1885–1950 ===
| Election | Member | Party |
|---|---|---|
| 1885 | Handel Cossham | Liberal |
| 1890 by-election | Sir Joseph Dodge Weston | Liberal |
| 1895 by-election | Sir William Wills, Bt | Liberal |
| 1900 | Charles Hobhouse | Liberal |
| 1918 | George Britton | Coalition Liberal |
| Jan 1922 | George Britton | National Liberal |
| Nov 1922 | Harold Morris | National Liberal |
| Nov 1923 | Harold Morris | Liberal |
| Dec 1923 | Walter Baker | Labour |
| 1931 by-election | Sir Stafford Cripps | Labour |
| 1939 | Sir Stafford Cripps | Independent Labour |
| 1945 | Sir Stafford Cripps | Labour |
| 1950 | constituency abolished – see Bristol South East | |

=== MPs 1983–present ===
| Election | Member | Party |
|---|---|---|
| 1983 | Jonathan Sayeed | Conservative |
| 1992 | Jean Corston | Labour |
| 2005 | Kerry McCarthy | Labour |

== Elections ==
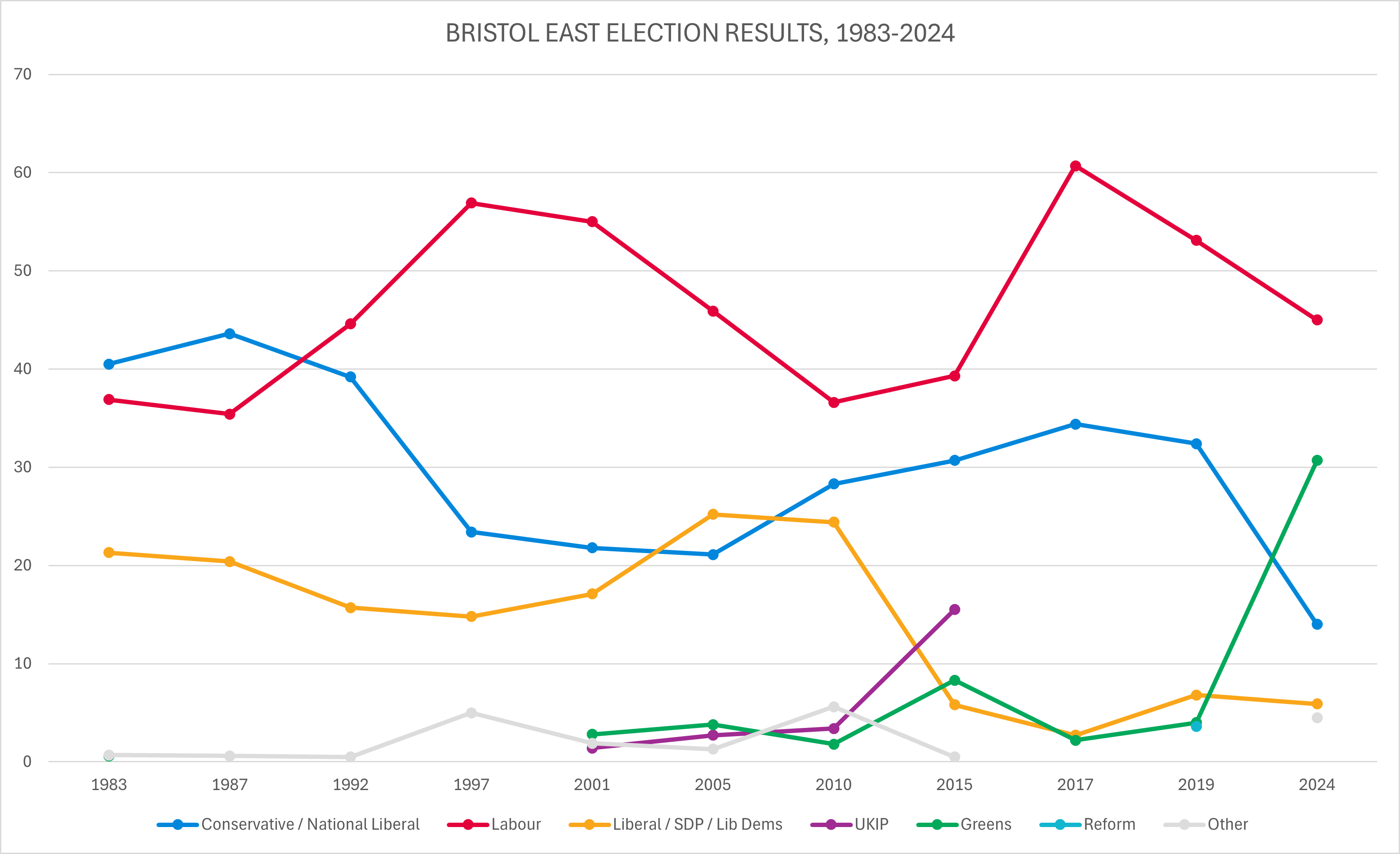
Election results 1983 to 2024

=== Elections in the 2020s ===
General election 2024: Bristol East
| Party | Candidate | Votes | % | ±% |
|---|---|---|---|---|
| Labour | Kerry McCarthy | 20,748 | 45.0 | −13.4 |
| Green | Ani Stafford-Townsend | 14,142 | 30.7 | +22.3 |
| Conservative | Dan Conaghan | 6,435 | 14.0 | −9.3 |
| Liberal Democrats | Tony Sutcliffe | 2,713 | 5.9 | −1.0 |
| Independent | Farooq Siddique | 1,259 | 2.7 | N/A |
| SDP | Clare Dunnage | 555 | 1.2 | N/A |
| Independent | Wael Arafat | 257 | 0.6 | N/A |
| Majority | | 6,606 | 14.3 | −20.8 |
| Turnout | | 46,109 | 60.7 | −12.1 |
| Registered electors | | 75,917 | | |
| Labour hold | | Swing | −17.8 | |

=== Elections in the 2010s ===
2019 notional result
| Party | Vote | % |
|---|---|---|
| Labour | 32,280 | 58.4 |
| Conservative | 12,887 | 23.3 |
| Green | 4,664 | 8.4 |
| Liberal Democrats | 3,840 | 6.9 |
| Brexit Party | 1,615 | 2.9 |
| Turnout | 55,286 | 72.8 |
| Electorate | 75,936 | |

General election 2019: Bristol East
| Party | Candidate | Votes | % | ±% |
|---|---|---|---|---|
| Labour | Kerry McCarthy | 27,717 | 53.1 | −7.6 |
| Conservative | Sarah Codling | 16,923 | 32.4 | −2.0 |
| Liberal Democrats | Nicholas Coombes | 3,527 | 6.8 | +4.1 |
| Green | Conan Connolly | 2,106 | 4.0 | +1.8 |
| Brexit Party | Tim Page | 1,881 | 3.6 | N/A |
| Majority | | 10,794 | 20.7 | −5.6 |
| Turnout | | 52,154 | 70.6 | +0.4 |
| Labour hold | | Swing | -2.9 | |

General election 2017: Bristol East
| Party | Candidate | Votes | % | ±% |
|---|---|---|---|---|
| Labour | Kerry McCarthy | 30,847 | 60.7 | +21.4 |
| Conservative | Theo Clarke | 17,453 | 34.4 | +3.7 |
| Liberal Democrats | Chris Lucas | 1,389 | 2.7 | −3.1 |
| Green | Lorraine Francis | 1,110 | 2.2 | −6.1 |
| Majority | | 13,394 | 26.3 | +17.7 |
| Turnout | | 50,799 | 70.2 | +6.0 |
| Labour hold | | Swing | +8.9 | |

General election 2015: Bristol East
| Party | Candidate | Votes | % | ±% |
|---|---|---|---|---|
| Labour | Kerry McCarthy | 18,148 | 39.3 | +2.7 |
| Conservative | Theo Clarke | 14,168 | 30.7 | +2.4 |
| UKIP | James McMurray | 7,152 | 15.5 | +12.1 |
| Green | Lorraine Francis | 3,827 | 8.3 | +6.5 |
| Liberal Democrats | Abdul Malik | 2,689 | 5.8 | −18.6 |
| TUSC | Matt Gordon | 229 | 0.5 | +0.1 |
| Majority | | 3,980 | 8.6 | +0.3 |
| Turnout | | 46,213 | 64.2 | −0.6 |
| Labour hold | | Swing | +0.2 | |

General election 2010: Bristol East
| Party | Candidate | Votes | % | ±% |
|---|---|---|---|---|
| Labour | Kerry McCarthy | 16,471 | 36.6 | −8.9 |
| Conservative | Adeela Shafi | 12,749 | 28.3 | +0.2 |
| Liberal Democrats | Mike Popham | 10,993 | 24.4 | +4.7 |
| BNP | Brian Jenkins | 1,960 | 4.4 | N/A |
| UKIP | Philip Collins | 1,510 | 3.4 | +0.7 |
| Green | Glenn Vowles | 803 | 1.8 | −0.9 |
| English Democrat | Stephen Wright | 347 | 0.8 | N/A |
| TUSC | Rae Lynch | 184 | 0.4 | N/A |
| Majority | | 3,722 | 8.3 | |
| Turnout | | 45,017 | 64.8 | +1.8 |
| Labour hold | | Swing | −4.5 | |

=== Elections in the 2000s ===
General election 2005: Bristol East
| Party | Candidate | Votes | % | ±% |
|---|---|---|---|---|
| Labour | Kerry McCarthy | 19,152 | 45.9 | −9.1 |
| Liberal Democrats | Philip James | 10,531 | 25.2 | +8.1 |
| Conservative | Julia Manning | 8,787 | 21.1 | −0.7 |
| Green | Arjuna Krishna-Das | 1,586 | 3.8 | +1.0 |
| UKIP | Jean Smith | 1,132 | 2.7 | +1.3 |
| Respect | Paulette North | 532 | 1.3 | N/A |
| Majority | | 8,621 | 20.7 | −12.5 |
| Turnout | | 41,720 | 61.3 | +3.9 |
| Labour hold | | Swing | −8.6 | |

General election 2001: Bristol East
| Party | Candidate | Votes | % | ±% |
|---|---|---|---|---|
| Labour | Jean Corston | 22,180 | 55.0 | −1.9 |
| Conservative | Jack Lopresti | 8,788 | 21.8 | −1.6 |
| Liberal Democrats | Brian Niblett | 6,915 | 17.1 | +2.3 |
| Green | Geoff Collard | 1,110 | 2.8 | N/A |
| UKIP | Roger Marsh | 572 | 1.4 | N/A |
| Socialist Labour | Michael Langley | 438 | 1.1 | −0.5 |
| Socialist Alliance | Andrew Pryor | 331 | 0.8 | N/A |
| Majority | | 13,392 | 33.2 | −0.3 |
| Turnout | | 40,334 | 57.4 | −12.3 |
| Labour hold | | Swing | | |

=== Elections in the 1990s ===
General election 1997: Bristol East
| Party | Candidate | Votes | % | ±% |
|---|---|---|---|---|
| Labour | Jean Corston | 27,418 | 56.9 | +10.3 |
| Conservative | Ed Vaizey | 11,259 | 23.4 | −15.8 |
| Liberal Democrats | Peter Tyzack | 7,121 | 14.8 | −0.9 |
| Referendum | Gerry Philip | 1,479 | 3.1 | N/A |
| Socialist Labour | Paul Williams | 766 | 1.6 | N/A |
| Natural Law | John McLaggan | 158 | 0.3 | N/A |
| Majority | | 16,159 | 33.5 | +28.1 |
| Turnout | | 48,201 | 69.7 | −11.6 |
| Labour hold | | Swing | +13.0 | |

General election 1992: Bristol East
| Party | Candidate | Votes | % | ±% |
|---|---|---|---|---|
| Labour | Jean Corston | 22,418 | 44.6 | +9.2 |
| Conservative | Jonathan Sayeed | 19,726 | 39.2 | −4.4 |
| Liberal Democrats | John Francis Kiely | 7,903 | 15.7 | −4.7 |
| National Front | Ian Anderson | 270 | 0.5 | −0.1 |
| Majority | | 2,692 | 5.4 | N/A |
| Turnout | | 50,317 | 80.3 | +1.6 |
| Labour gain from Conservative | | Swing | +6.8 | |

=== Elections in the 1980s ===
General election 1987: Bristol East
| Party | Candidate | Votes | % | ±% |
|---|---|---|---|---|
| Conservative | Jonathan Sayeed | 21,906 | 43.6 | +3.1 |
| Labour | Ronald Thomas | 17,783 | 35.4 | −1.5 |
| Liberal | Don Foster | 10,247 | 20.4 | −0.9 |
| National Front | Philip Kingston | 286 | 0.6 | −0.1 |
| Majority | | 4,123 | 8.2 | +4.6 |
| Turnout | | 50,222 | 78.7 | +4.8 |
| Conservative hold | | Swing | +2.3 | |

General election 1983: Bristol East
| Party | Candidate | Votes | % | ±% |
|---|---|---|---|---|
| Conservative | Jonathan Sayeed | 19,844 | 40.5 | +1.0 |
| Labour | Tony Benn | 18,055 | 36.9 | –11.4 |
| Liberal | Peter Tryer | 10,404 | 21.3 | +10.4 |
| National Front | Ernest Andrews | 343 | 0.7 | N/A |
| Ecology | Gundula Dorey | 311 | 0.6 | N/A |
| Majority | | 1,789 | 3.6 | N/A |
| Turnout | | 48,957 | 73.9 | |
| Conservative gain from Labour | | Swing | +6.2 | |

1979 notional result
| Party | Vote | % |
|---|---|---|
| Labour | 23,693 | 48.2 |
| Conservative | 19,397 | 39.5 |
| Liberal | 5,329 | 10.8 |
| Others | 706 | 1.4 |
| Turnout | 49,125 | |
| Electorate | | |

=== Elections in the 1940s ===
General election 1945: Bristol East
| Party | Candidate | Votes | % | ±% |
|---|---|---|---|---|
| Labour | Stafford Cripps | 27,975 | 73.5 | +14.2 |
| Conservative | T.D. Corpe | 10,073 | 26.5 | New |
| Majority | | 17,902 | 47.0 | +28.4 |
| Turnout | | 37,768 | 76.3 | +0.5 |
| Labour hold | | Swing | | |

=== Elections in the 1930s ===
General election 1935: Bristol East
| Party | Candidate | Votes | % | ±% |
|---|---|---|---|---|
| Labour | Stafford Cripps | 22,009 | 59.3 | +8.7 |
| National Labour | Archibald Church | 15,126 | 40.7 | N/A |
| Majority | | 6,883 | 18.6 | +17.4 |
| Turnout | | 37,135 | 75.8 | −4.4 |
| Labour hold | | Swing | | |

General election 1931: Bristol East
| Party | Candidate | Votes | % | ±% |
|---|---|---|---|---|
| Labour | Stafford Cripps | 19,435 | 50.6 | −15.2 |
| Conservative | James Spreull | 19,006 | 49.4 | N/A |
| Majority | | 429 | 1.2 | −30.4 |
| Turnout | | 38,441 | 80.2 | +2.0 |
| Labour hold | | Swing | | |

1931 Bristol East by-election
| Party | Candidate | Votes | % | ±% |
|---|---|---|---|---|
| Labour | Stafford Cripps | 19,261 | 61.7 | −4.1 |
| Conservative | Peter Chapman-Walker | 7,937 | 25.4 | New |
| Liberal | Edward Baker | 4,010 | 12.8 | −21.4 |
| Majority | | 11,324 | 36.3 | +4.7 |
| Turnout | | 31,208 | | |
| Labour hold | | Swing | | |

=== Elections in the 1920s ===
General election 1929: Bristol East
| Party | Candidate | Votes | % | ±% |
|---|---|---|---|---|
| Labour | Walter Baker | 24,197 | 65.8 | +7.6 |
| Liberal | Charles Gordon-Spencer | 12,576 | 34.2 | −7.6 |
| Majority | | 11,621 | 31.6 | +15.2 |
| Turnout | | 36,773 | 78.2 | −1.6 |
| Registered electors | | 47,039 | | |
| Labour hold | | Swing | +7.6 | |

W.J. Baker

General election 1924: Bristol East
| Party | Candidate | Votes | % | ±% |
|---|---|---|---|---|
| Labour | Walter Baker | 16,920 | 58.2 | +4.5 |
| Liberal | Herbert John Maggs | 12,143 | 41.8 | −4.5 |
| Majority | | 4,777 | 16.4 | +9.0 |
| Turnout | | 29,063 | 79.8 | +3.3 |
| Registered electors | | 36,441 | | |
| Labour hold | | Swing | +4.5 | |

General election 1923: Bristol East
| Party | Candidate | Votes | % | ±% |
|---|---|---|---|---|
| Labour | Walter Baker | 14,828 | 53.7 | +4.0 |
| Liberal | Harold Morris | 12,788 | 46.3 | −4.0 |
| Majority | | 2,040 | 7.4 | N/A |
| Turnout | | 27,616 | 76.5 | −1.0 |
| Registered electors | | 36,105 | | |
| Labour gain from National Liberal | | Swing | +4.0 | |

General election 1922: Bristol East
| Party | Candidate | Votes | % | ±% |
|---|---|---|---|---|
| National Liberal | Harold Morris | 13,910 | 50.3 | +0.7 |
| Labour | Luke Bateman | 13,759 | 49.7 | +6.9 |
| Majority | | 151 | 0.6 | N/A |
| Turnout | | 27,669 | 77.5 | +21.0 |
| Registered electors | | 35,704 | | |
| National Liberal gain from National Liberal | | Swing | | |

=== Elections in the 1910s ===
Hobhouse

General election 1918: Bristol East
| Party | | Candidate | Votes | % |
|---|---|---|---|---|
| C | National Liberal | George Britton | 9,434 | 49.6 |
| | Labour | Luke Bateman | 8,135 | 42.8 |
| | Liberal | Charles Hobhouse | 1,447 | 7.6 |
| Majority | | | 1,299 | 6.8 |
| Turnout | | | 19,016 | 56.5 |
| Registered electors | | | | |
| | National Liberal win (new boundaries) | | | |
C indicates candidate endorsed by the coalition government.

== Election results 1885–1918 ==
=== Elections in the 1910s ===
General Election 1914–15: Another General Election was required to take place before the end of 1915. The political parties had been making preparations for an election to take place and by July 1914, the following candidates had been selected;

- Liberal: Charles Hobhouse
- Unionist: Thomas Clarence Edward Goff
- Independent Labour Party: Walter Ayles

1911 Bristol East by-election
| Party | Candidate | Votes | % | ±% |
|---|---|---|---|---|
| Liberal | Charles Hobhouse | 4,913 | 62.8 | −0.1 |
| Independent | Walter Moore | 2,913 | 37.2 | New |
| Majority | | 2,000 | 25.6 | −0.2 |
| Turnout | | 7,826 | 52.3 | −24.6 |
| Registered electors | | 14,951 | | |
| Liberal hold | | Swing | N/A | |

General election December 1910: Bristol East
| Party | Candidate | Votes | % | ±% |
|---|---|---|---|---|
| Liberal | Charles Hobhouse | 7,229 | 62.9 | +10.9 |
| Conservative | Patrick Hannon | 4,263 | 37.1 | +6.3 |
| Majority | | 2,966 | 25.8 | +4.6 |
| Turnout | | 11,492 | 76.9 | −10.0 |
| Registered electors | | 15,060 | | |
| Liberal hold | | Swing | −2.3 | |

General election January 1910: Bristol East
| Party | Candidate | Votes | % | ±% |
|---|---|---|---|---|
| Liberal | Charles Hobhouse | 6,804 | 52.0 | −19.7 |
| Conservative | Thomas Henry Batten | 4,033 | 30.8 | +2.5 |
| Labour | Frank Sheppard | 2,255 | 17.2 | New |
| Majority | | 2,771 | 21.2 | −22.2 |
| Turnout | | 13,092 | 86.9 | +10.8 |
| Registered electors | | 15,060 | | |
| Liberal hold | | Swing | −11.1 | |

=== Elections in the 1900s ===
General election 1906: Bristol East
| Party | Candidate | Votes | % | ±% |
|---|---|---|---|---|
| Liberal | Charles Hobhouse | 7,935 | 71.7 | +15.3 |
| Liberal Unionist | Thomas Bertram Johnston | 3,129 | 28.3 | −15.3 |
| Majority | | 4,806 | 43.4 | +30.6 |
| Turnout | | 11,064 | 76.1 | +9.1 |
| Registered electors | | 14,543 | | |
| Liberal hold | | Swing | +15.3 | |

Hobhouse

General election 1900: Bristol East
| Party | Candidate | Votes | % | ±% |
|---|---|---|---|---|
| Liberal | Charles Hobhouse | 4,979 | 56.4 | −12.4 |
| Conservative | Robert Sanders | 3,848 | 43.6 | New |
| Majority | | 1,131 | 12.8 | −24.8 |
| Turnout | | 8,827 | 67.0 | +13.7 |
| Registered electors | | 13,181 | | |
| Liberal hold | | Swing | N/A | |

=== Elections in the 1890s ===
Wills

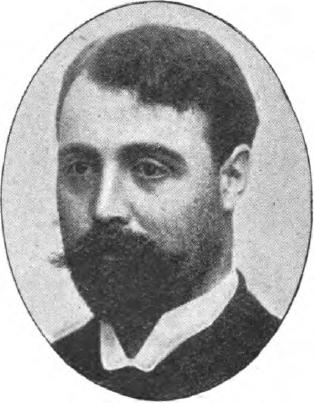
Hobson

General election 1895: Bristol East
| Party | Candidate | Votes | % | ±% |
|---|---|---|---|---|
| Liberal | William Wills | 4,129 | 68.8 | +17.6 |
| Ind. Labour Party | Samuel George Hobson | 1,874 | 31.2 | New |
| Majority | | 2,255 | 37.6 | +35.2 |
| Turnout | | 6,003 | 53.3 | −11.5 |
| Registered electors | | 11,254 | | |
| Liberal hold | | Swing | N/A | |

1895 Bristol East by-election
| Party | Candidate | Votes | % | ±% |
|---|---|---|---|---|
| Liberal | William Wills | 3,740 | 51.2 | N/A |
| Independent Labour | Hugh Holmes Gore (Note: Supported by the Bristol Socialist Party and the Independent Labour Party) | 3,558 | 48.8 | New |
| Majority | | 182 | 2.4 | N/A |
| Turnout | | 7,298 | 64.8 | N/A |
| Registered electors | | 11,254 | | |
| Liberal hold | | Swing | N/A | |

General election 1892: Bristol East
| Party | Candidate | Votes | % | ±% |
|---|---|---|---|---|
| Liberal | Joseph Dodge Weston | Unopposed | | |
| Liberal hold | | | | |

Wilson

1890 Bristol East by-election
| Party | Candidate | Votes | % | ±% |
|---|---|---|---|---|
| Liberal | Joseph Dodge Weston | 4,775 | 65.6 | +0.1 |
| Conservative | James Inskip | 1,900 | 26.1 | −8.4 |
| Independent Labour | Havelock Wilson | 602 | 8.3 | New |
| Majority | | 2,875 | 39.5 | +8.5 |
| Turnout | | 7,277 | 70.6 | +11.6 |
| Registered electors | | 10,310 | | |
| Liberal hold | | Swing | +4.3 | |

=== Elections in the 1880s ===
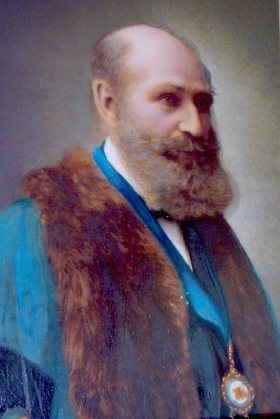
Cossham

General election 1886: Bristol East
| Party | Candidate | Votes | % | ±% |
|---|---|---|---|---|
| Liberal | Handel Cossham | 3,672 | 65.5 | −0.6 |
| Conservative | James Inskip | 1,936 | 34.5 | +0.6 |
| Majority | | 1,736 | 31.0 | −1.2 |
| Turnout | | 5,608 | 59.0 | −15.0 |
| Registered electors | | 9,506 | | |
| Liberal hold | | Swing | -0.6 | |

General election 1885: Bristol East
| Party | Candidate | Votes | % | ±% |
|---|---|---|---|---|
| Liberal | Handel Cossham | 4,647 | 66.1 | |
| Conservative | James Broad Bissell | 2,383 | 33.9 | |
| Majority | | 2,264 | 32.2 | |
| Turnout | | 7,030 | 74.0 | |
| Registered electors | | 9,506 | | |
| Liberal win (new seat) | | | | |

== See also ==
- List of parliamentary constituencies in Avon

== Sources ==
- British Parliamentary Election Results 1885–1918, compiled and edited by F.W.S. Craig (The Macmillan Press 1974)
