= Luke Bateman (trade unionist) =

- Born: 31 October 1873; Bristol, U.K.
- Died: 22 June 1943 (aged 69); Bristol, U.K.
- Organization: National Union of Railwaymen
- Military career
- Allegiance: United Kingdom
- Branch: Royal Navy
- Service years: 1893–1896

Luke Henry Bateman (31 October 1873 – 22 June 1943) was a British trade unionist and politician. He repeatedly narrowly missed out on election to Parliament.

Bateman was born in Bristol to William Bateman, a railway engine driver, and Elizabeth Bush. He served in the Royal Navy from 1893–6. He began working for the Great Western Railway, becoming a stationary engineman, and joining the National Union of Railwaymen (NUR). He slowly came to prominence in the union, serving as president of its Bristol Joint Committee, then as president of its Bristol and South West District Council.

Bateman joined the Independent Labour Party (ILP) and also the Union of Democratic Control. The ILP was affiliated to the Labour Party, for which he stood in Bristol East at the 1918 United Kingdom general election, taking second place with 42.8% of the vote. He stood again at the 1922 United Kingdom general election, increasing his vote share to 49.7%, and missing out on election by only 151 votes. He did not stand in 1923, but at the 1924 and 1929 United Kingdom general elections, he stood in Monmouth, taking around a quarter of the vote on each occasion.

He died at Southmead Hospital in Bristol, aged 69.
