= Kerry McCarthy =

British politician (born 1965)

Kerry McCarthy MP
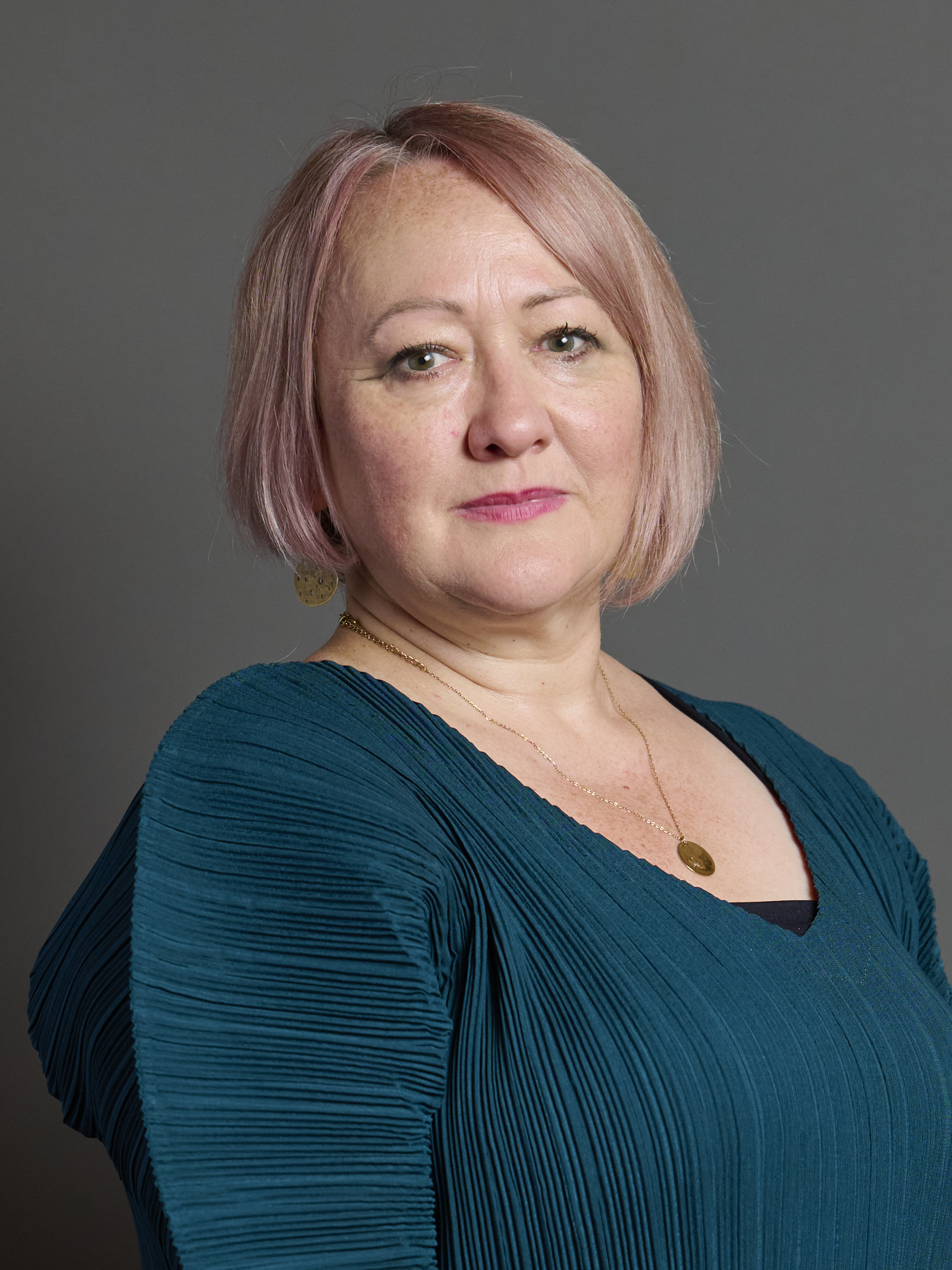
- Official portrait, 2024

Parliamentary Under-Secretary of State for Climate
- In office 9 July 2024 – 6 September 2025
- Prime Minister: Keir Starmer
- Preceded by: Position established
- Succeeded by: Katie White

Shadow Minister for Climate Change
- In office 29 June 2022 – 5 July 2024
- Leader: Keir Starmer
- Preceded by: Olivia Blake
- Succeeded by: Position abolished

Shadow Minister for Green Transport
- In office 9 April 2020 – 4 December 2021
- Leader: Keir Starmer
- Preceded by: Position established
- Succeeded by: Gill Furniss

Shadow Secretary of State for Environment, Food and Rural Affairs
- In office 13 September 2015 – 26 June 2016
- Leader: Jeremy Corbyn
- Preceded by: Maria Eagle
- Succeeded by: Rachael Maskell

Shadow Minister for Foreign and Commonwealth Affairs
- In office 7 October 2011 – 13 September 2015
- Leader: Ed Miliband
- Preceded by: Emma Reynolds
- Succeeded by: Diana Johnson

Shadow Treasury Minister
- In office 8 October 2010 – 7 October 2011
- Leader: Ed Miliband
- Preceded by: Position Established
- Succeeded by: Position Abolished

Shadow Minister for Disabled People
- Acting; 6 May 2010 – 8 October 2010
- Leader: Harriet Harman
- Preceded by: Mark Harper
- Succeeded by: Margaret Curran

Member of Parliament for Bristol East
- Incumbent
- Assumed office 5 May 2005
- Preceded by: Jean Corston
- Majority: 6,606 (14.3%)

Personal details
- Born: Kerry Gillian McCarthy; 26 March 1965 (age 61) Luton, Bedfordshire, England
- Party: Labour
- Education: University of Liverpool; London Guildhall University; University of London
- Website: Official website

Kerry Gillian McCarthy (born 26 March 1965) is a British politician who has served as Member of Parliament (MP) for Bristol East since 2005. A member of the Labour Party, she served as Parliamentary Under-Secretary of State for Climate from July 2024 to September 2025. She was Shadow Secretary of State for Environment, Food and Rural Affairs from 2015 to 2016.

== Early life and career ==
McCarthy was born in Luton, where she attended Denbigh High School, followed by Luton Sixth Form College. McCarthy studied at the University of Liverpool reading Russian studies, before studying law at City of London Polytechnic.

McCarthy qualified as a solicitor in 1994 and worked as a lawyer for Abbey National Treasury Services (1994–1996), Merrill Lynch Europe (1996–1999) and the Labour Party (2001). She was a director of London Luton Airport Ltd (1999–2003), a director at Britain in Europe (2002–2004), and Head of Public Policy at the Waterfront Partnership (2004–2005).

McCarthy began a doctorate on Labour links with the City of London at Goldsmiths' College, but did not complete it. She was a councillor in Luton, and was a member of Labour's National Policy Forum.

== Parliamentary career ==
In 2005, McCarthy was selected as the Labour candidate for Bristol East through an all-women shortlist and retained the seat for her party at the 2005 general election. She was appointed a member of the Treasury Select Committee, and was involved in its inquiries into financial inclusion, globalisation and the role of the International Monetary Fund, and the administration of tax credits. She has also sat on two Finance Bill committees, as well as the UK Borders Bill Committee, the Offender Management Bill Committee and the Mental Health Bill Committee. She was described as a Gordon Brown loyalist, stating in 2005 that "The Chancellor's nine Budgets are the bedrock of all that we have achieved in government".

In April 2007, McCarthy was appointed Parliamentary Private Secretary (PPS) to Rosie Winterton, Minister for Health Services, and helped her steer the Mental Health Bill through the Commons. From July 2007 to January 2009, she worked as PPS to Douglas Alexander, the Secretary of State for International Development, before being made a Junior Whip in June 2009. She is chair of the South West Group of Labour MP.

She was re-elected at the 2010 General Election, with her majority reduced by more than a half. McCarthy was appointed as an acting Shadow Minister for Work and Pensions in May 2010 with responsibility for disability. She supported Ed Balls in the 2010 Labour leadership election, and became a junior Shadow Treasury Minister following Ed Miliband's election in October 2010. In September 2011, McCarthy was made Shadow Foreign Office Minister with a responsibility for East Asia, South Asia, the Caribbean, Latin America and human rights.

On World Vegan Day in November 2011, McCarthy became the first MP to set out in Parliament the case for becoming vegan. She is also believed to be the first MP to deliver a speech in Parliament with the aid of an iPad.

After being re-elected with an increased majority in the 2015 General Election, McCarthy nominated Andy Burnham in that year's Labour leadership campaign. She was appointed by Jeremy Corbyn as Shadow Secretary of State for Environment, Food and Rural Affairs in September 2015. She argued in a Spring 2015 interview with Viva!life, a magazine for vegans, that meat should be treated like tobacco, with "public campaigns to stop people eating it". Tim Bonner of the Countryside Alliance said her opinions "are completely out of step with the vast majority of people". "The world is not going to turn vegan because I am in post", McCarthy said on BBC Radio 4's Farming Today shortly after her appointment. "I have my own personal views on what I choose to eat, but I accept that we have a livestock industry in this country. What I want is for the industry to have the best welfare standards possible, to be sustainable as well as economically viable."

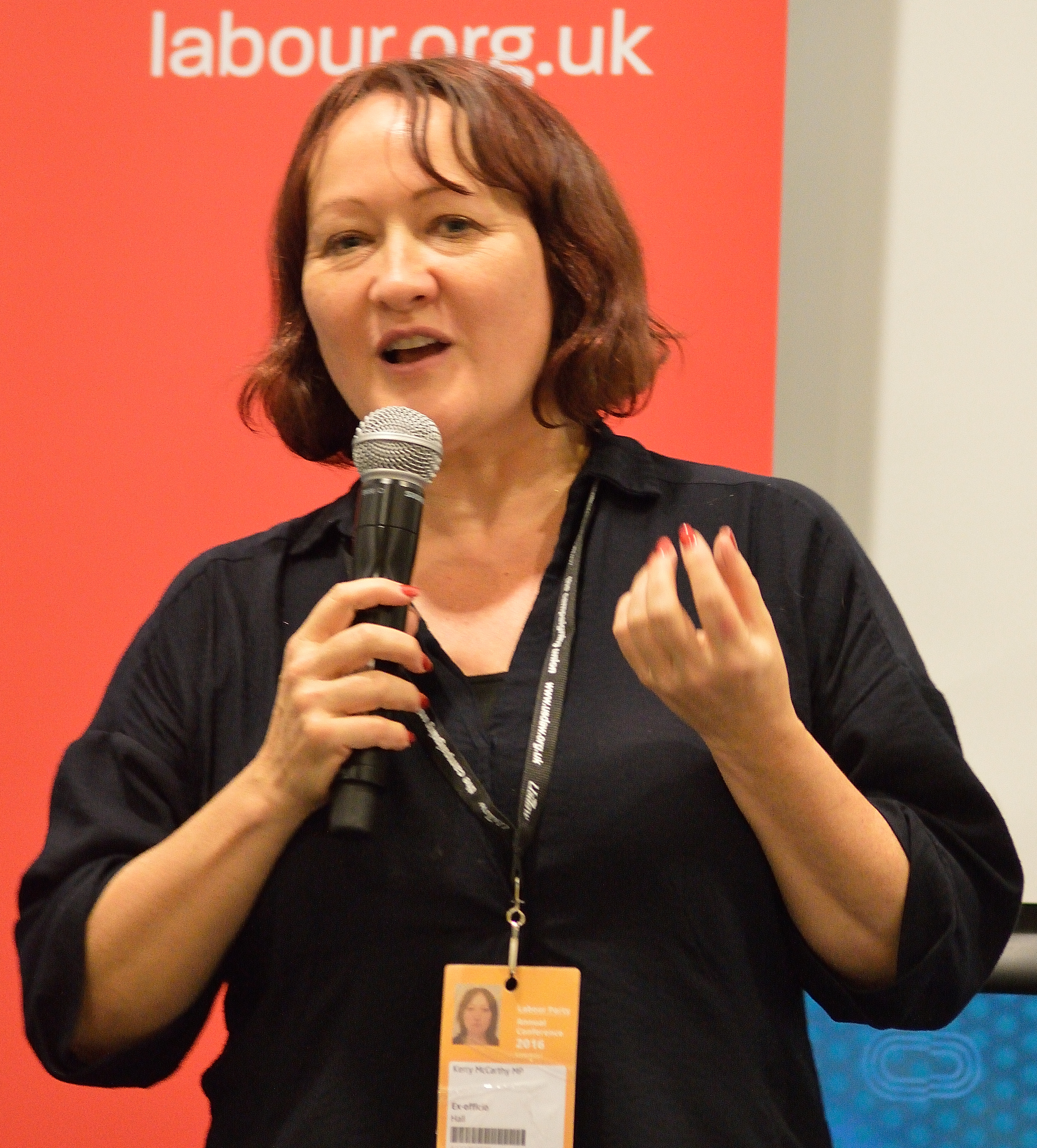
Kerry McCarthy speaking at a 2016 Labour Party Conference fringe meeting

On 26 June 2016, McCarthy was among dozens of shadow ministers who resigned from Corbyn's team. She argued that "a new leader is needed to take on the challenges ahead". According to McCarthy, in an article for The Huffington Post: "When the leader's office did venture into Defra territory, they didn't talk to the shadow team". McCarthy did not believe Corbyn was the right Labour leader or a potential prime minister. She supported Owen Smith in the 2016 Labour leadership election.

In November 2017, McCarthy raised a complaint of inappropriate behaviour against Kelvin Hopkins, Labour MP for Luton North, which remained unresolved at the time Hopkins stepped down as an MP before the 2019 General Election.

McCarthy nominated Keir Starmer in the 2020 Labour leadership election, and was appointed Shadow Green Transport Minister following his election in April 2020. She stepped down from the front bench owing to 'personal reasons' in Autumn 2021.

On 29 June 2022 McCarthy returned to the Labour frontbench as Shadow Minister for Climate Change following the resignation of Olivia Blake.

The New Statesman included McCarthy as one of the Labour MPs who best understand climate and nature policy, as identified by the UK's leading green groups and think tanks.

In May 2024, McCarthy introduced a ten minute rule bill requiring the Government to identify and support children with a parent in prison.

== Controversies ==
In May 2009, McCarthy repaid £402 for a second bed claimed in expenses for her one bedroom flat. She stated the claim had been made in error.

In October 2010, McCarthy admitted a charge of electoral fraud, accepting a police caution for revealing on Twitter the number of postal votes cast per party in her constituency at the 2010 election, and apologised for this action.

In May 2012, McCarthy branded a fellow train passenger a "lager drinking oaf" and suggested he should "have been killed before he could breed" in comments made to her followers on Twitter. According to McCarthy, he was playing loud techno music on the train and wearing a t-shirt emblazoned with an obscene phrase about his sex life.

== Personal life ==
McCarthy is a vegan, and has given talks on the subject. She was a presenter at the Vegan Society's 2005 annual awards. She divides her time between Bristol and London, and is a part-owner of a house in Luton. She is a vice-president of the League Against Cruel Sports, and an honorary associate of the National Secular Society.

McCarthy is a fan of punk and post-punk music. She has written about industrial bands including Cabaret Voltaire and Test Dept for the website Louder Than War.

Parliament of the United Kingdom
Preceded by Jean Corston	Member of Parliament for Bristol East; 2005–present	Incumbent
Political offices
Preceded by Maria Eagle	Shadow Secretary of State for Environment, Food and Rural Affairs; 2015–2016	Succeeded by Rachael Maskell
