= Harry Morris =

Harry Morris may refer to:

- Harry Morris (footballer, born 1897) (1897–1985), English football player (Swindon Town)
- Harry Morris (footballer, born 1866) (1866–1931), English football player and businessman (Small Heath / Birmingham City)
- Harry Morris, 1st Baron Morris of Kenwood (1893–1954), British Labour Party politician, Member of Parliament, 1945–1950
- Harry Morris (sportsman) (1896–1974), Australian diver and wrestler
- Harry Morris (footballer, born 1900) (1900–1964), English footballer for Crewe Alexandra, Hartlepools United and Wigan Borough

== See also ==
- Henry Morris (disambiguation)
- Harold Morris (disambiguation)
