= Peter Townsend (sociologist) =

British sociologist

Peter Townsend

Peter Brereton Townsend (6 April 1928, Middlesbrough – 8 June 2009, Dursley) was a British sociologist. The last position he held was Professor of International Social Policy at the London School of Economics. He was also emeritus Professor of Social Policy in the University of Bristol, and was one of the co-founders of the University of Essex. He wrote widely on the economics of poverty and was co-founder of the Child Poverty Action Group. The Peter Townsend Policy Press Prize was established by the British Academy in his memory.

== Life and education ==
Peter Townsend was educated at Fleet Road Elementary School, Gospel Oak, University College School, St John's College, Cambridge (MA) and the Free University, Berlin. He was married three times: Ruth Pearce (1949) with whom he had four sons; Joy Skegg (1977) with whom he had one daughter; Jean Ann Corston, a Labour peer and former MP (1985) (one stepson, one stepdaughter) who was his partner from 1980.

== Career ==
Townsend was dedicated to studying "very carefully the life of the poorest and most handicapped members of society". He applied this consistently outside academia as well as within it.

During the 1960s, Townsend served as a member on the Council for Training in Social Work's Research Committee. The committee was chaired by Sir Charles Morris.

Townsend was co-founder of the Child Poverty Action Group in 1965, was its chair for 20 years and Life President from 1989. He also co-founded the Disability Alliance in response to the Thalidomide scandal, and chaired it for 25 years.

== Work ==
=== Definition of relative poverty ===
- "Individuals, families and groups in the population can be said to be in poverty when they lack the resources to obtain the type of diet, participate in the activities and have the living conditions and the amenities which are customary, or at least widely encouraged or approved in the societies to which they belong. Their resources are so seriously below those commanded by the average family that they are in effect excluded from the ordinary living patterns, customs, and activities (page 31)."

=== Townsend inefficiency ===
Townsend inefficiency is a possible property of monetary exchange. Rather than evaluating the utility he generated in production, one of the parties is evaluating the value of the money he gets in the transaction. In other words, a worker may only be looking at his paycheck instead of the amount of labour he promises to perform to get that paycheck. This sets up an inefficiency in the monetary exchange.

== Death ==
Townsend died of heart failure on 8 June 2009. He was survived by his wife and his five children.

== Selected publications ==
- Child poverty in the developing world, Bristol: Policy Press 2003
- Better pensions: the state's responsibility, London: Catalyst Forum, 2003
- With Gordon, D. (eds.) World poverty: new policies to defeat an old enemy, Bristol: The Policy Press, 2002
- With Gordon, D. and Pantazis, C.The changing necessities of life, Working Paper 2 of the Poverty and Social Exclusion Survey, Townsend Centre for International Poverty Research, University of Bristol, Bristol, 2001
- With Gordon, D. (eds.) Breadline Europe: the measurement of poverty, Bristol: The Policy Press, 2000
- With et al. Poverty and social exclusion in Britain, York: Joseph Rowntree Foundation, 2000
- With et al. Absolute and overall poverty in Britain in 1997: what the population themselves say, Bristol: Bristol Statistical Monitoring Unit, University of Bristol, 1997
- The international analysis of poverty, London and New York, Harvester Wheatsheaf, 1993
- Hard times: what prospects for European social policy?, Liverpool: Liverpool University Press, 1992
- With Black, D. Inequalities in health: the Black Report and the health divide, 3rd ed. Harmondsworth: Penguin Books, 1992
- Unfinished statistical business?, Bristol: Department of Social Policy and Social Planning, University of Bristol, 1992
- With Gordon, D. Unfinished statistical business on low incomes?: a review of new proposals by the Department of Social Security for the production of public information on poverty, Bristol: Statistical Monitoring Unit, Dept. Social Policy and Social Planning, University of Bristol, 1992
- Meaningful statistics on poverty 1991, Bristol: Dept. Social Policy and Social Planning, University of Bristol, 1991
- The poor are poorer, a statistical report on changes in the living standards of rich and poor in the UK 1979–1989, Bristol: SMU, Dept. Social Policy and Soc. Planning, University of Bristol, 1991
- With Phillimore, P. and Beattie, A. Health and deprivation: inequality and the North, London, New York: Croom Helm, 1988
- With Walker, R. and Lawson, R. Responses to poverty: lessons from Europe, London: Heinemann Educational Books, 1984
- Why are the many poor?, London: Fabian Society, 1984
- With Walker, A. Disability in Britain: a manifesto of rights, Oxford: Martin Robertson, 1981
- With Bosanquet, N. Labour and equality: a Fabian study of Labour in power, 1974–79, London: Heinemann, 1980
- Poverty in the United Kingdom: a survey of household resources and standards of living, Harmondsworth: Penguin Books, 1979
- With Lewis, P. Inflation and low incomes, London: Fabian Society, 1975
- With Bosanquet, N. (eds.) Labour and inequality: sixteen Fabian essays, London: Fabian Society, 1972
- The concept of poverty: working papers on methods of investigation and life-styles of the poor in different countries, London: Heinemann Educational, 1971
- The fifth social service: a critical analysis of the Seebohm Proposals, London: Fabian Society, 1970
- With Reddin, M. and Kaim-Caudle P. Social services for all?, London: Fabian Society, 1968
- Poverty, socialism, and Labour in power, London: Fabian Society, 1967
- The last refuge: a survey of residential institutions and homes for the aged in England and Wales, London: Routledge and K. Paul, 1962
- The family life of old people: an inquiry in East London, London: Routledge, 1957

Party political offices
Preceded by Tony Benn	Chair of the Fabian Society; 1965–1966	Succeeded by William Rodgers
