= George Britton (politician) =

English boot and shoe manufacturer (1857 - 1929)

George Bryant Britton (1857 – 11 July 1929) was an English boot and shoe manufacturer and Liberal Party Member of Parliament.

== Date of Birth ==
From the inscription on his gravestone in Kingswood Methodist Church, Bristol, Britton was born in 1857.

== Career ==
Britton played an important role in the business and political life of Bristol in the late 19th and early 20th centuries. He was head of G B Britton & Sons Ltd, boot and shoe manufacturers, founded in 1875 and the company developed into one of Bristol's most successful enterprises.

== Local politics ==
Britton was elected to Bristol City Council in 1897. He was made an Alderman in 1921 and served as lord mayor for the year 1920–1921. While lord mayor of Bristol, Britton led a deputation from the city to the Australian high commissioner to urge the greater use of the port of Bristol for the importation of Australian produce. A strong advocate of tramways, he played an active part in the initiation of an electric tram service to Kingswood and also served as a justice of the peace.

He was also the president of the Anchor Society in Bristol in 1922

== Parliament ==
Britton was a leading Liberal in Bristol. He was sometime Chairman of the Bristol East Liberal Association and was said to be a popular employer in the city. However soon after the establishment of the Coalition Government of David Lloyd George in December 1916 he severed his connection with the Independent Liberal Party to give support to the Coalition and the prime minister. He later suggested the Coalition should be named the Commonwealth Party, perhaps pre-figuring Lloyd George's attempts to bring about a Centre Party or fusion with the Coalition Conservatives. As the 1918 general election approached, the MP for Bristol East Sir Charles Hobhouse announced he would not support the Coalition, claiming he had nothing in common with the Conservatives and no use for Bonar Law. This produced a split in Bristol East Liberal Association and opened the way for Britton to be nominated as the Coalition Liberal candidate.

East Bristol was a predominantly working-class seat with a Radical and nonconformist tradition. In the general election, Britton faced Labour opposition from Luke Bateman, an active local member of the National Union of Railwaymen as well as from Hobhouse standing as an Independent Asquithian Liberal. Standing as a Coalition Liberal, and presumably having the advantage of receiving the Coalition Coupon, Britton won the seat with 9,434 votes to Bateman's 8,135, a majority of 1,299. Hobhouse came bottom of the poll with 1,447 votes, losing his deposit.

He served only one term in Parliament, and did not stand again at the 1922 general election.

== Death ==
Britton died at his home Lodge Side, Kingswood on 11 July 1929, at the age of 66 years. He was survived by his wife Annie, the daughter of John Henshaw, whom he married in 1902.

== Archives ==
Records of GB Britton & Sons Ltd are held by Bristol Archives (Ref. 42111) (online catalogue).

Parliament of the United Kingdom
Preceded by Sir Charles Hobhouse	Member of Parliament for Bristol East; 1918–1922	Succeeded by Harold Morris
