= 1931 Bristol East by-election =

UK Parliamentary by-election

The 1931 Bristol East by-election was held on 16 January 1931. The by-election was held due to the death of the incumbent Labour MP, Walter John Baker. It was won by the Labour candidate Stafford Cripps.

== Electoral history ==
General election 1929: Bristol East
Party	Candidate	Votes	%	±%
Labour	Walter Baker	24,197	65.8	+7.6
Liberal	Charles Gordon-Spencer	12,576	34.2	−7.6
Majority		11,621	31.6	+15.2
Turnout		36,773	78.2	−1.6
Labour hold		Swing	+7.6	

== Candidates ==
The Liberal Party ran 56 year-old Edward Baker. Baker owned an engineering business in East London. He had previously contested Manchester Platting for the Liberal Party at the 1924 general election and Howdenshire for the Liberal Party at the 1929 general election.

== Result ==
Bristol East by-election January 1931
Party	Candidate	Votes	%	±%
Labour	Stafford Cripps	19,261	61.7	−4.1
Conservative	Peter Chapman-Walker	7,937	25.4	New
Liberal	Edward Baker	4,010	12.8	−21.4
Majority		11,324	36.3	+4.7
Turnout		31,208		
Labour hold		Swing		

== Aftermath ==
Following the formation of the National Government, the Liberals in Bristol East chose not to run a candidate at the 1931 general election. Baker was chosen again to contest Howdenshire but withdrew to support the incumbent National Government candidate. He fought Howdenshire again in 1935 without success.
