= Henry Maurice (minister) =

Henry Maurice (1634 – 30 July 1682) was a Welsh Anglican priest who became an Independent minister.

== Personal life ==
Maurice was born in 1634 in the parish of Aberdaron, Wales, the son of Griffith Morris. He married Elin, daughter of Jeffrey Glynn, a Royalist squire. He died aged 48.

== Career ==
Maurice was educated at Jesus College, Oxford. He was ordained and in 1661 served after the Restoration as vicar of Bromfield, Shropshire, and rector of Mellteyrn, Caernarfonshire. After becoming rector of Church Stretton in 1668, he had by June 1671 become a Dissenter, preaching widely in Shropshire and Wales. He has been described as "one of the most virile Puritan propagators of the second generation." His industry and preaching led to the Independent churches in his area becoming numerically strong. He died on 30 July 1682.

== Financial and criminal acts ==
Maurice was briefly imprisoned in 1671 in Shrewsbury prison on a charge of debt. Following this, he moved to Much Wenlock. Maurice took action immediately following the Declaration of Indulgence of 1672 by taking out licenses for three houses. He then preached without a license at Stretton and Brecknock. He continued to preach in unlicensed places on his journey to his home region of Llŷn.

== See also ==
J. E. Griffith, Pedigrees of Anglesey and Carnarvonshire Families, 1914, 271;

Richards, ‘Puritan Visitation of Jesus College, Oxford’, in The Transactions of the Honourable Society of Cymmrodorion, 1922-3, 90-2;

Calendar of State Papers, Domestic Series, Record Publication, 1656, 252;
