= Charles Hobhouse =

British politician (1862–1941)

The Right Honourable Sir Charles Hobhouse Bt JP TD
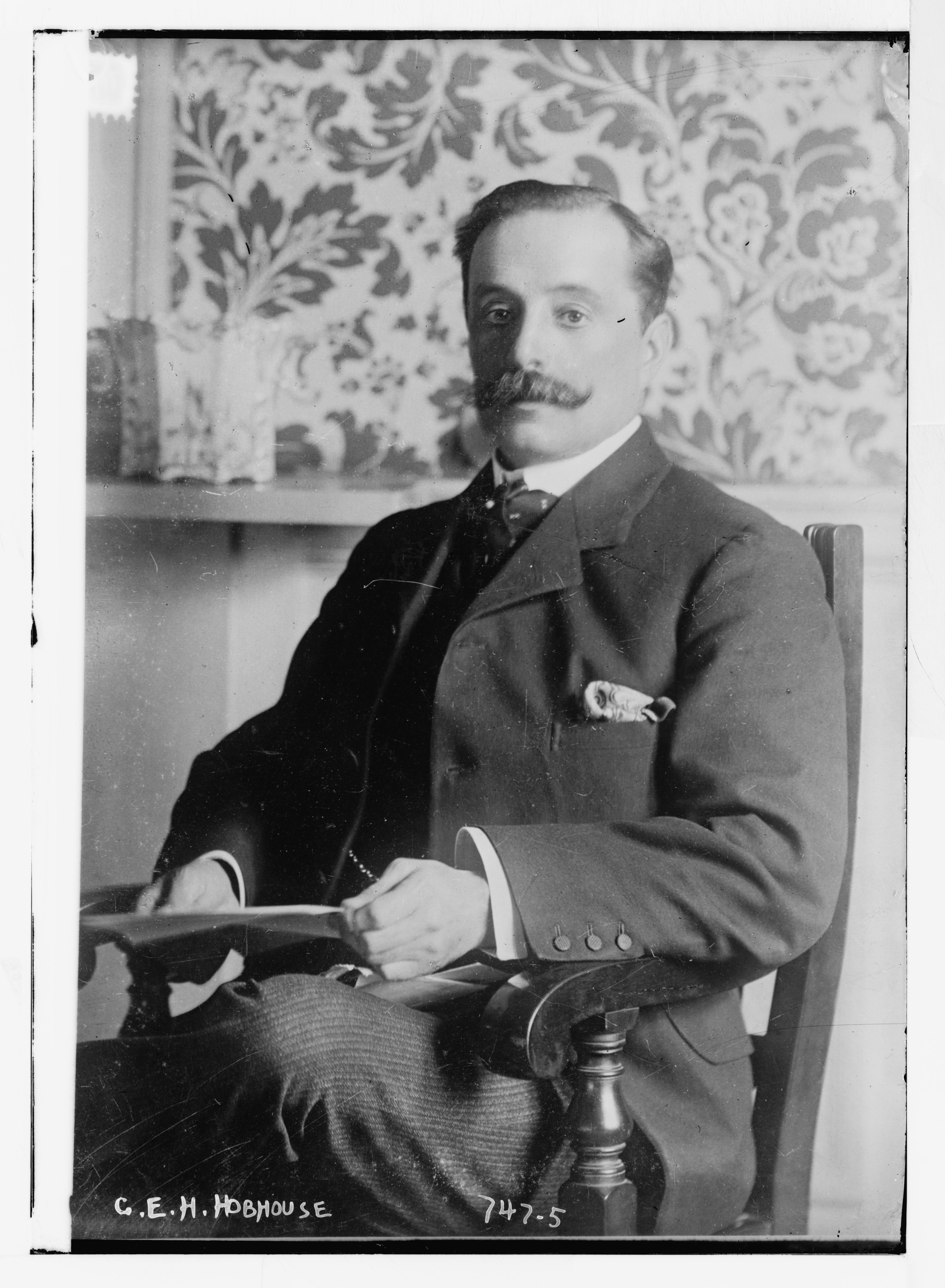

Chancellor of the Duchy of Lancaster
- In office 23 October 1911 – 11 February 1914
- Monarch: George V
- Prime Minister: H. H. Asquith
- Preceded by: Jack Pease
- Succeeded by: Charles Masterman

Postmaster General
- In office 11 February 1914 – 25 May 1915
- Monarch: George V
- Prime Minister: H. H. Asquith
- Preceded by: Herbert Samuel
- Succeeded by: Herbert Samuel

Personal details
- Born: 30 June 1862
- Died: 26 June 1941 (aged 78) Monkton Farleigh, Wiltshire, England
- Party: Liberal
- Spouses: Georgina Fuller (m. 1890; died 1927) Aimee Brendon (m. 1931)
- Education: Christ Church, Oxford

Sir Charles Edward Henry Hobhouse, 4th Baronet, TD, PC, JP (30 June 1862 – 26 June 1941) was a British Liberal politician and officer in the Territorial Force. He was a member of the Liberal cabinet of H. H. Asquith between 1911 and 1915, and kept a diary, since published, of his time in the Cabinet.

== Background and education ==
He was the third child and only son of Sir Charles Parry Hobhouse, 3rd Baronet, and his wife Edith Lucy Turton, daughter of Sir Thomas Turton, 2nd Baronet, born at Dormansland, Surrey. He was educated at Eton College, and matriculated at Christ Church, Oxford in 1880. He then attended the Royal Military College, Sandhurst.

== Military career ==
Hobhouse was commissioned from Sandhurst as a lieutenant in the King's Royal Rifle Corps (KRRC) on 23 August 1884, and served with the regiment until he resigned from the Regular Army on 7 May 1890 to enter politics. However, he became a captain in the part-time 7th Battalion, KRRC, (the Royal 2nd Middlesex Militia) on 17 April 1897. When a new 3rd Volunteer Battalion of the Gloucestershire Regiment was formed in Bristol during the Second Boer War, he was commissioned as a major in the unit, succeeding to its command with the rank of lieutenant-colonel on 5 April 1903. He continued in that role when the battalion became the 6th Battalion, Gloucestershire Regiment in the Territorial Force in 1908. Hobhouse retired from the command on 5 April 1911, but on the death of the 6th Gloucesters' Honorary Colonel, Earl Roberts, shortly after the outbreak of World War I, he was appointed to succeed him on 24 December 1914. Hobhouse continued to be the 6th Gloucesters' Hon Colonel for the rest of his life, the battalion being converted into the 44th Royal Tank Regiment in 1938.

== Political career ==
Hobhouse's first attempt to get elected was at North Buckinghamshire. He was Liberal Member of Parliament for Devizes between 1892 and 1895 and for Bristol East between 1900 and 1918. He was a Parliamentary Private Secretary at the Colonial Office from 1892 to 1895 and a Church Estates Commissioner from 1906 to 1907.

Hobhouse was appointed to his first ministerial post in 1907 when Sir Henry Campbell-Bannerman made him Under-Secretary of State for India. The Hobhouse Commission he headed recommended a cautious expansion of the panchayat raj system in Indian villages. The commission's report influenced later legislation for India. He then served under H. H. Asquith as Financial Secretary to the Treasury from 1908 to 1911. In 1909 he was sworn of the Privy Council. He was a member of Asquith's cabinet as Chancellor of the Duchy of Lancaster between 1911 and 1914 and as Postmaster-General between 1914 and May 1915 when Asquith's Liberal government was replaced by a coalition in which Hobhouse did not hold office.

Hobhouse, told by his doctors that he had only months to live, retired from active politics in October 1915 (the last published entry in his diary is 14 October, followed by a letter to Asquith the following day thanking him for his kindness in promoting his career). However, on the operating table, what had been thought to be a growth was found to be merely “a large stoppage” and he resumed limited political activity thereafter.

Apart from his career in national politics, Hobhouse was an Alderman on Wiltshire County Council from 1893 to 1924. He succeeded his father as fourth Baronet in 1916. At the Coupon election in 1918 he lost his seat, as did Asquith, and the leading former Liberal Cabinet ministers McKenna, Runciman, Simon, Samuel and McKinnon Wood. Hobhouse became the first former Cabinet minister to suffer the embarrassment of losing his deposit, deposits being a measure just introduced to discourage “freak” candidates.

In 1922 Hobhouse stood again in North Buckinghamshire but again came third, behind both Conservative and Labour.

Hobhouse, long associated with Bristol, was appointed to the largely honorary positions of President of the Western Counties Liberal Federation from 1924 to 1935 and President of the National Liberal Federation from 1926 to 1930.

== Personal life ==
Hobhouse married first in 1890 Georgina Fleetwood Fuller (Lady Nina), daughter of George Pargiter Fuller of Neston Park; she died in 1927. He married again in 1931, to Aimee Gladys Brendon, widow of Benjamin Adams Brendon, and daughter of David Charles Ballinger Griffith. He had no children by either marriage. They lived at Monkton Farleigh until he died on 26 June 1941, aged 78.

Although only a relatively minor political figure, Hobhouse is now remembered largely for his diaries, which cover the years 1893-8 and 1904 to October 1915. Filling three handwritten exercise books, they were discovered in a drawer by a nephew after his death. About a third of the material was published in 1977, offering vivid portraits of people and events in Asquith’s Cabinet.

Parliament of the United Kingdom
Preceded by Walter Long	Member of Parliament for Devizes; 1892–1895	Succeeded by Edward Goulding
Preceded by Sir William Wills	Member of Parliament for Bristol East; 1900–1918	Succeeded by George Britton
Church of England titles
Preceded by Francis Seymour Stevenson	Second Church Estates Commissioner; 1906–1907	Succeeded by James Tomkinson
Political offices
Preceded by John Ellis	Under-Secretary of State for India; 1907–1908	Succeeded by Thomas Buchanan
Preceded by Walter Runciman	Financial Secretary to the Treasury; 1908–1911	Succeeded by Thomas McKinnon Wood
Preceded by Jack Pease	Chancellor of the Duchy of Lancaster; 1911–1914	Succeeded by Charles Masterman
Preceded by Herbert Samuel	Postmaster-General; 1914–1915	Succeeded by Herbert Samuel
Party political offices
Preceded by John Alfred Spender	President of the National Liberal Federation; 1927–1930	Succeeded by Arthur Brampton
Baronetage of the United Kingdom
Preceded by Charles Hobhouse	Baronet (of Westbury); 1916–1941	Succeeded by Reginald Hobhouse
